= Simon Almeida =

Indian Roman Catholic prelate (born 1960)

The Reverend Simon Almeida
- Bishop of Poona
- Church: Roman Catholic Church
- Province: Bombay
- Diocese: Poona
- See: Poona
- Appointed: 1 November 2025
- In office: 2025–present
- Predecessor: John Rodrigues
- Previous posts: Deputy Secretary, Western Region Bishops’ Council; parish priest (various parishes in the Diocese of Poona)

Orders
- Ordination: 1 April 1990 by Valerian D'Souza
- Consecration: 17 January 2026 by Filipe Neri Ferrão

Personal details
- Born: 4 November 1960 (age 66) Ghas, Maharashtra, India
- Denomination: Roman Catholic
- Education: St. Pius X College, Mumbai; University of Bombay (B.A. Psychology; M.A. Sociology); Ateneo de Manila University (M.A. Pastoral Studies)
- Motto: To make all things new in Christ (Rev 21:5) ख्रिस्ताठायी सर्वांगीण नुतनीकरणासाठी (प्रकटीकरण २१:५)

Simon Almeida (born 4 November 1960) is an Indian Roman Catholic prelate who has been appointed as the Bishop of the Diocese of Poona on 1 November 2025 by Pope Leo XIV.

== Early life and education ==
Simon Almeida was born on 4 November 1960 in Ghas (now in the Diocese of Vasai), Maharashtra, India. He completed his primary education at St. Gonsalo Garcia Primary School and secondary education at Holy Cross High School, Nirmal. In 1978, he entered the Prakash Bhavan Minor Seminary in Pune.

He pursued philosophical and theological studies at St. Pius X College in Goregaon, Mumbai. Almeida earned a Bachelor of Arts degree in Psychology and a Master of Arts in Sociology from the University of Bombay. He further obtained a Diploma in Foundations for Pastoral Renewal and Steward Leadership in the Church of the Poor from the East Asian Pastoral Institute, Manila (2000–2001) and a Master of Arts in Pastoral Studies from Ateneo de Manila University, Quezon City, Philippines (2000–2002).

== Priesthood ==
Almeida was ordained a priest on 1 April 1990 for the Diocese of Poona by Bishop Valerian D'Souza. During his 35 years of priestly ministry, he held various pastoral and administrative roles within the diocese.

His positions include:

- Assistant Parish Priest, St. Patrick's Cathedral, Pune (1990–1994)
- Assistant Parish Priest, St. Ignatius Parish, Kirkee (1994–1996)
- Diocesan Director for Youth (1996–2000)
- Rector, Prakash Bhavan Minor Seminary, Pune (2002–2003)
- Parish Priest, St. Patrick's Cathedral, Pune (2003–2008)
- Member, Presbyteral Council (from 2003)
- Parish Priest, St. Francis Xavier Parish, Chinchwad (2008–2013)
- Member, College of Consultors (from 2009)
- Financial Administrator, Diocese of Poona (2010–2015)
- Parish Priest, St. Anne’s Church, Solapur Bazaar (2013–2019)
- Parish Priest, St. John Paul II Church, Wakad (2019–2023)
- Additional Secretary (later Deputy Secretary), Western Region Bishop’s Council (2023–2025)
- Parish Priest, St. Joseph’s Church, Ghorpuri, Pune (from June 2025)

== Episcopate ==
On 1 November 2025, Pope Leo XIV appointed Almeida as the Bishop of Poona, succeeding Bishop John Rodrigues, who was appointed Coadjutor Archbishop of Bombay on 30 November 2024.

Simon Almeida received episcopal ordination from Cardinal Filipe Neri Ferrao on 17 January 2026 and was installed as the Bishop of Poona in the same ceremony. The co-consecrators were Archbishop John Rodrigues and Archbishop Elias Gonsalves.
