= Roman Catholic Diocese of Nashik =

Roman Catholic diocese in Maharashtra, India

Coordinates: 19.9630°N 73.8389°E

Diocese of Nashik Dioecesis Nashikensis नाशिक धर्मप्रांत
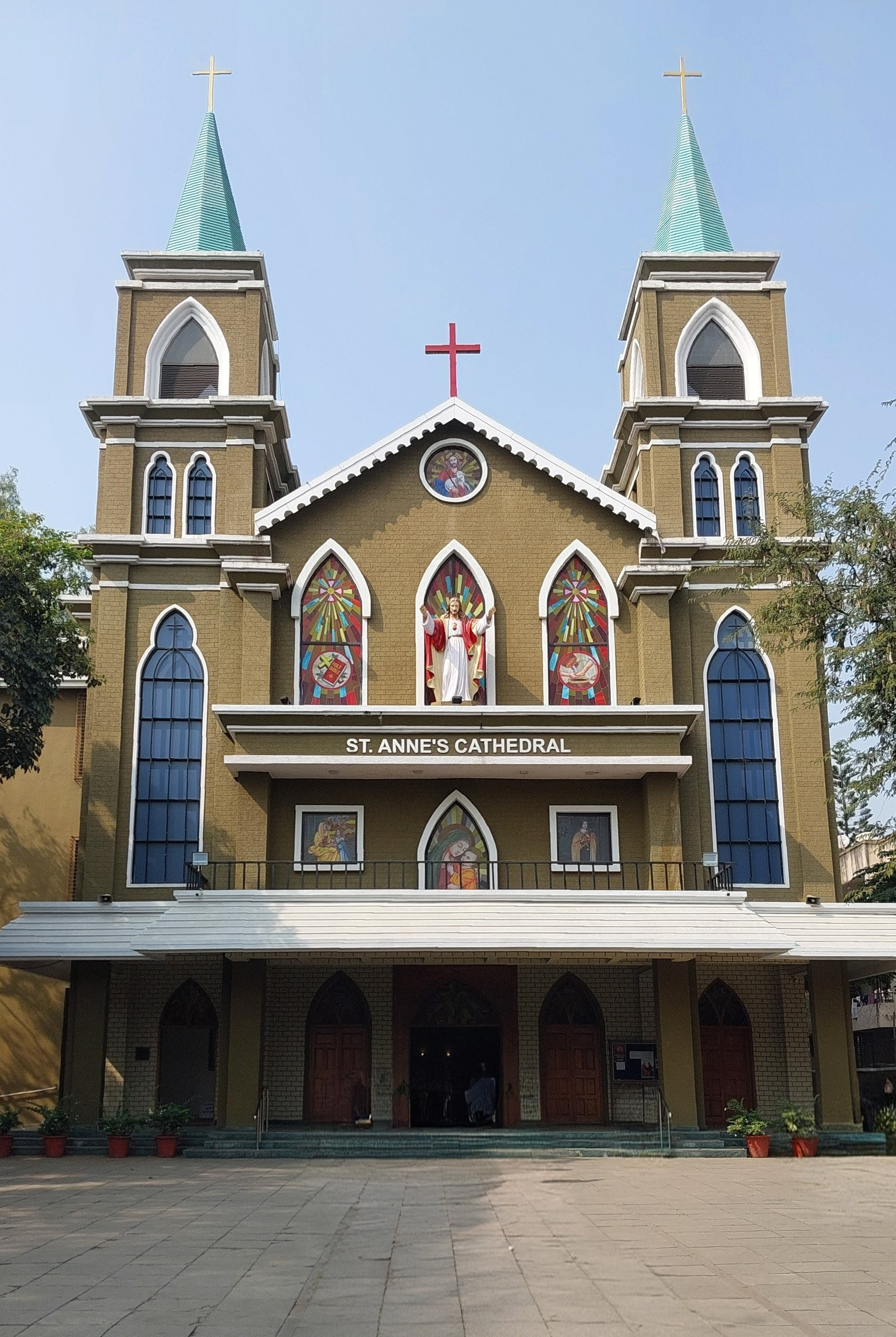
- The new Cathedral of St. Anne in Nashik

Location
- Country: India
- Ecclesiastical province: Bombay
- Metropolitan: Bombay

Statistics
- Area: 57,592 km^{2} (22,236 sq mi)
- Population: Total; Catholics: (as of 2004); 20,000,000; 86,090 (0.4%)

Information
- Denomination: Roman Catholic
- Rite: Latin Rite
- Established: 15 May 1987
- Cathedral: Cathedral of St Anne in Nashik

Current leadership
- Pope: Leo XIV
- Bishop: Barthol Barretto
- Metropolitan Archbishop: John Rodrigues
- Bishops emeritus: Lourdunada Daniel

The Roman Catholic Diocese of Nashik (Latin: Nashiken(sis)) is a Catholic diocese located in the city of Nashik in the ecclesiastical province of Bombay in India.

== History ==
- May 15, 1987: Established as Diocese of Nashik from the Roman Catholic Diocese of Poona

== Bishops ==
- Thomas Bhalerao, S.J. (15 May 1987 – 31 March 2007 )
- Valerian D'Souza (Apostolic Administrator 31 March 2007 – 16 January 2008)
- Felix Anthony Machado (16 January 2008 - November 2009), transferred to Vasai diocese
- Lourdunada Daniel (11 November 2010 - 30 December 2023)
  - Apostolic Administrator from November 2009
- Barthol Barretto (30 December 2023 – present)
