= Felix Anthony Machado =

Indian prelate of the Catholic Church (born 1948)

Most Reverend Felix Anthony Machado
- Bishop Emeritus of Vasai
- Archdiocese: Mumbai
- Diocese: Vasai
- Appointed: 19 December 2009
- Term ended: 6 June 2024
- Predecessor: Thomas Dabre
- Successor: Thomas D'Souza

Orders
- Ordination: 30 October 1976
- Consecration: 8 March 2008 by Oswald Cardinal Gracias

Personal details
- Born: 6 June 1948 (age 78) Vasai Mumbai India
- Denomination: Roman Catholic
- Motto: Peace And Harmony

Felix Anthony Machado (born 6 June 1948) is an Indian prelate of the Catholic Church who was Archbishop of Vasai since 2009 to 2024. He spent a decade in the Roman Curia as under-secretary of the Pontifical Council for Interreligious Dialogue.

== Biography ==
He was born on 6 June 1948 in Vasai, Maharashtra, India. He was ordained a priest on 30 October 1976 for the Diocese of Bombay. His family relations include both Christians and Hindus; one of his cousins was among the founders of the Bharatiya Janata Party, the principal force behind contemporary Hindu nationalism. He was incardinated in the Diocese of Vasai on 22 May 1998.

He studied philosophy at the Catholic University of Lyon and lived in the ecumenical community of Taizé in France for seven years, spending one of those years as a volunteer in a refugee camp in Bangladesh. He then earned a master's degree in theology at Maryknoll Seminary in New York and a doctorate from Fordham University.

Machado served from 1999 to 2008 as under-secretary of the Pontifical Council for Interreligious Dialogue. In that position he helped organize the interreligious prayer service held in Assisi in 2002.

Pope Benedict XVI gave him the personal title of archbishop and named him head of the Diocese of Nashik on 16 January 2008. He received his episcopal consecration on 8 March 2008 from Cardinal Oswald Gracias. When he first heard of the 2008 bombings in Mumbai, when the attackers were still unidentified, he said: "We do not have to be superficial by saying that it is all about religion. The situation is extremely complex. Sometimes these tragedies are given faces and names, but we have to go deeper in our analysis of the causes."

Pope Benedict transferred him to Vasai on 10 November 2009, and he was installed there on 19 December.

He chairs the Office for Interreligious Dialogue of the Federation of Asian (Catholic) Bishops' Conferences (FABC); and Office for Interreligious Dialogue of the Catholic Bishops' Conference of India (CBCI). He has developed a good working relationship with the Sikh community and advocates dialogue with Hindus to ease their concerns about conversions to Christianity. He has repeatedly denied that conversions are ever involuntary; as early as 2000 in a meeting at the Vatican, he challenged Indian Prime Minister Atal Behari Vajpayee to identify a specific instance of forced conversion.
