= Simón Almeida =

Simón Almeida may refer to:

- Simon Almeida (born 1960), Indian Roman Catholic prelate
- Steven Almeida (Simón Steven Almeida Trinidad, born 1995), Mexican footballer
