= Oswald Gracias =

Indian Roman Catholic Church cardinal

His Eminence Oswald Gracias
- Cardinal, Archbishop Emeritus of Bombay
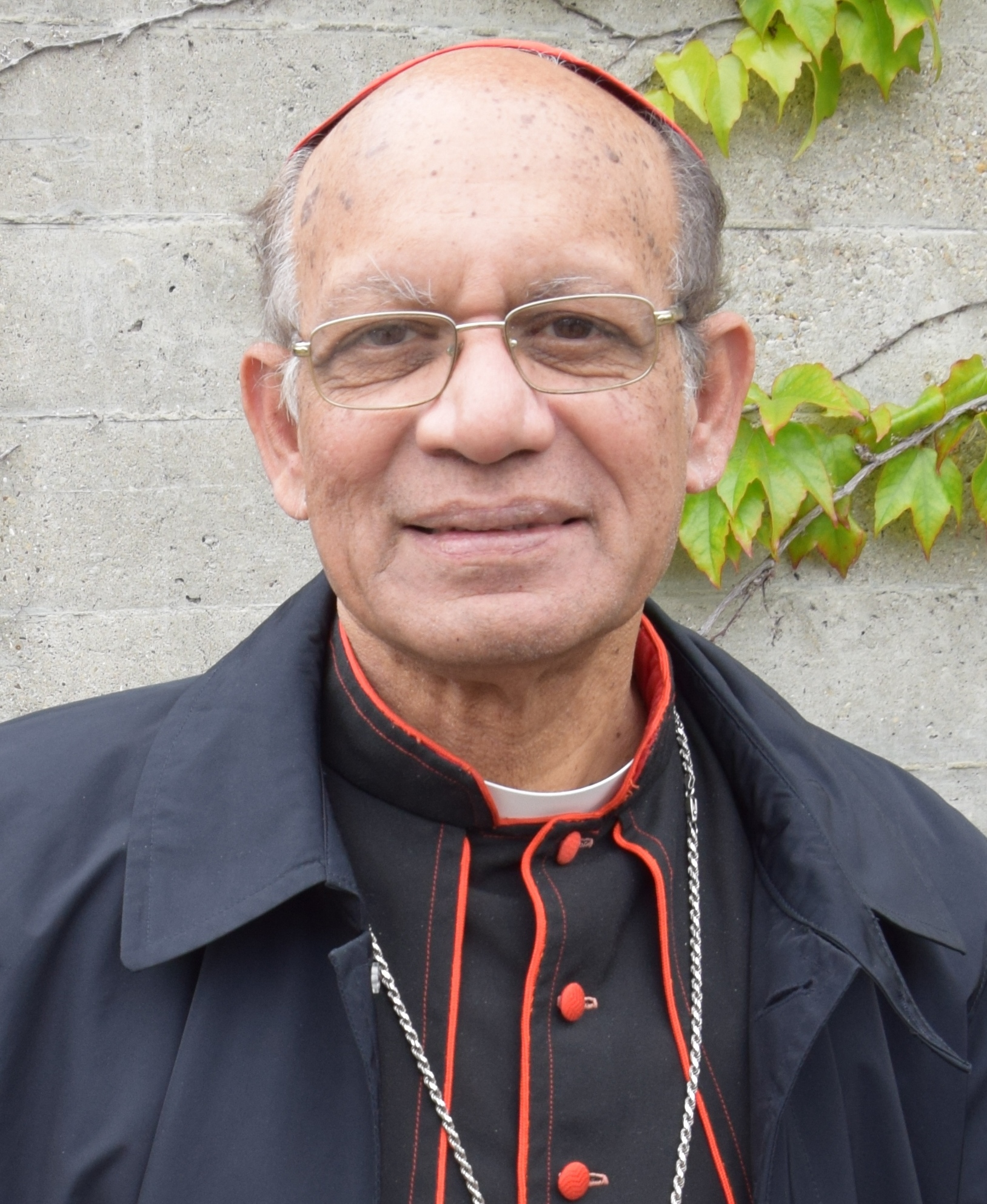
- Gracias in 2014
- Church: Catholic Church
- Archdiocese: Bombay
- Province: Bombay
- Appointed: 14 October 2006
- Installed: 14 December 2006
- Term ended: 25 January 2025
- Predecessor: Ivan Dias
- Successor: John Rodrigues
- Other posts: Cardinal-Priest of San Paolo della Croce a Corviale; Member of the Council of Cardinals
- Previous posts: Auxiliary Bishop of Bombay (1997–2000); Titular Bishop of Bladia (1997–2000); Archbishop of Agra, India (2000–2006)

Orders
- Ordination: 20 December 1970 by Valerian Gracias
- Consecration: 16 September 1997 by Ivan Dias
- Created cardinal: 24 November 2007 by Benedict XVI
- Rank: Cardinal-Priest

Personal details
- Born: Oswald Gracias; 24 December 1944 (age 81) Bombay, Bombay Presidency, British India
- Denomination: Roman Catholic
- Residence: Mumbai, India
- Parents: Jervis Gracias and Aduzinda Gracias
- Education: St. Michael's High School, Mahim; St. Xavier's College, Mumbai; Pontifical Urbaniana University Rome
- Motto: To Reconcile All Things in Christ सवॉचा ख्रिस्तात समेट साघण्यासाठी^{(Marathi)}
- Coat of arms: Oswald Gracias's coat of arms

Styles of Oswald Gracias
- Reference style: His Eminence
- Spoken style: Your Eminence
- Religious style: Cardinal
- Informal style: Cardinal
- See: Bombay

Ordination history of Oswald Gracias
History
Priestly ordination
- Ordained by: Valerian Cardinal Gracias
- Date: 20 December 1970
- Place: Bombay, India
Episcopal consecration
- Principal consecrator: Archbishop Ivan Cornelius Dias
- Co-consecrators: Bishop Ferdinand Joseph Fonseca, Bishop Bosco Penha
- Date: 16 September 1997
- Place: Saint Michael Church, Mahim
Cardinalate
- Elevated by: Pope Benedict XVI
- Date: 24 November 2007
Episcopal succession
Bishops consecrated by Oswald Gracias as principal consecrator
- Archbishop Felix Anthony Machado: 8 March 2008
- Bishop Henry D’Souza: 12 June 2008
- Archbishop Elias Joseph Gonsalves: 29 September 2012
- Bishop Udumala Bala Showreddy: 23 May 2013
- Bishop Savio Dominic Fernandes: 29 June 2013
- Archbishop John Rodrigues: 29 June 2013
- Bishop Barthol Barretto: 28 January 2017
- Bishop Allwyn D’Silva: 28 January 2017

Oswald Gracias (born 24 December 1944) is an Indian Catholic prelate who served as Archbishop of Bombay from 2006 to 2025. He was made a cardinal in 2007. In 2008, he was elected vice-president of the Conference of Catholic Bishops of India and in 2010 its president.

Gracias was president of the Federation of Asian Bishops' Conferences from 2010 to 2019. In 2013, he was appointed to the Council of Cardinals, established by Pope Francis to help with reforming the Catholic Church's central administration. Gracias was considered papabile in 2013.

== Biography ==
=== Early life and ordination ===
Gracias was born in Bombay (modern-day Mumbai) to Jervis and Aduzinda Gracias. He completed his school studies at St. Michael's School in Mahim and joined college at the Jesuit St. Xavier's College, Mumbai. After a year, he entered the Seminary of St. Pius X in Bombay, where he studied philosophy and theology. Gracias was ordained to the priesthood by Valerian Gracias (no relation) on 20 December 1970. From 1971 to 1976, he served as Chancellor and secretary to Bishop Joseph Rodericks of Jamshedpur.

=== Diocesan work ===
Gracias attended the Pontifical Urbaniana University from 1976 to 1982; he obtained a doctorate in canon law, a diploma in jurisprudence. Upon his return to Bombay, he was named chancellor, judge of the metropolitan tribunal, and judicial vicar. From 1982, he was the chancellor of the Archdiocese of Mumbai, and from 1988 he was the judicial vicar for the archdiocese. In 1991, Gracias was made archdiocesan consultor. He also taught as a visiting professor in the seminaries of Bombay, Poona, and Bangalore. He was also president of the Canon Law Society of India.

=== Bishop and Archbishop ===
On 28 June 1997, Gracias was appointed Auxiliary Bishop of Bombay and Titular Bishop of Bladia by Pope John Paul II. He received his episcopal consecration on the following 16 September from Archbishop Ivan Dias, with Bishops Ferdinand Fonseca and Bosco Penha serving as co-consecrators. Pope John Paul named Gracias Archbishop of Agra on 7 September 2000. Pope Benedict XVI appointed him Archbishop of Bombay on 14 October 2006. He has served as secretary of the Catholic Bishops' Conference of India (CBCI), which comprises several rites, and as president of the Conference of Catholic Bishops of India, the organization of the Latin Church.

=== Cardinal ===
On 17 October 2007, Pope Benedict XVI announced that he would elevate Gracias and twenty-two other prelates to the College of Cardinals. At the consistory in St. Peter's Basilica on 24 November 2007, he was created Cardinal-Priest of San Paolo della Croce a Corviale.

On 20 February 2008 Gracias was elected 1st vice president of the Catholic Bishops Conference of India (CBCI) of which had earlier served as secretary general.

Pope Benedict named him a member of the Pontifical Council for Legislative Texts on 6 May 2008 and of the Congregation for Divine Worship and the Discipline of the Sacraments on 6 July 2010.

On 18 September 2008 in Washington, D.C., Gracias underwent surgery for a rare form of cancer. He recovered completely.

Gracias was elected secretary general of the Federation of Asian Bishops' Conferences (FABC) by the presidents of its 19 constituent bishops conferences representing 28 Asian countries. He led the organization from 2010 to 2019. (Note: The Federation coordinates the work of the Church in these countries and represents Asian interests to the Vatican and government authorities. The Central Secretariat located in Hong Kong is the principal service agency of FABC, and an instrument of co-ordination both within FABC and with outside offices and agencies throughout Asia.)

On 29 December 2011 he was appointed a member of the Pontifical Council for Social Communications. On 12 June 2012 Gracias was appointed a member of the Congregation for Catholic Education. On 18 September 2012, Gracias was appointed by Pope Benedict XVI to serve as a synod father for the October 2012 Ordinary General Assembly of the Synod of Bishops on the New Evangelization.

Both in Agra and Mumbai Gracias endorsed teaching the discipline of yoga in Catholic schools. In 2012 he wrote: "Through the prescribed postures and exercises one improves one's all round sense of well being and is able to enter into oneself so as to commune better with God." (Note: The openness to yoga on the part of Catholic institutions is controversial in some quarters, but it has a long history. Cardinal Valerian Gracias supported the practice.)

He was mentioned as a possible candidate for election to the papacy in the 2013 conclave. He was one of the cardinal electors who participated in that conclave, which elected Pope Francis.

On 13 April 2013 he was appointed to the Council of Cardinal Advisers, a group established by Pope Francis to advise him and to study a plan for revising the Apostolic Constitution on the Roman Curia.

Gracias was elected to a two-year term as president of the CBCI on 9 February 2018.

On 6 December 2019, the Congregation for the Evangelization of Peoples notified Gracias that Pope Francis wants Gracias to remain Archbishop. Gracias had submitted his resignation as required in anticipation of his 75th birthday. On 17 February 2020, Gracias was elected to a second two-year term as president of the CBCI.

On 15 October 2020, Pope Francis renewed Gracias's term on the Council of Cardinal Advisers.

Pope Francis accepted his resignation as archbishop of Bombay on 25 January 2025.

== Views and theology ==
=== Humanae Vitae ===
Gracias delivered an address to priests in 2018 to commemorate Pope Paul VI's papal encyclical Humanae Vitae. In his address, Gracias affirmed that the Church "stands unwavering and firm in her decision to embrace and uphold life as well as embrace, nurture, defend and uplift the gift of life, every life". The cardinal referred to the encyclical as "a great gift to the Church" because it was able to set out how the Church views marriage and family life, however, the cardinal noted that the encyclical was also a reminder about the need to "invest more in marriage preparation, prepare couples for marriage and enrich the marriages of those already married".

=== Married clergy ===
Cardinal Gracias has suggested that the pathway to married priests is still an open possibility; during the 2019 Synod of Bishops the cardinal suggested in his intervention that following present canon law could present possibilities for married men to be ordained to the priesthood, mentioning that special dispensations could be granted.

=== Abortion ===
In February 2020, Gracias stated that "human life must be respected and protected absolutely from the moment of conception", pointing out that "the Church has been unwavering in its protection of the sanctity of human life, from conception until natural death". In his address given to the 32nd plenary session of the Indian Episcopal Conference in Bangalore, Gracias condemned India's new abortion bill that would extend the period to end a pregnancy to 24 weeks, declaring that "bishops have the responsibility to spread Christ's message about the dignity of all human life".

=== Euthanasia ===
In March 2011, Gracias expressed his relief at the Indian Supreme Court's decision to reject the plea for the mercy killing of a nurse who was in a semi-comatose condition for over three decades. In remarks given to the Catholic News Service, the cardinal expressed his relief that the court rejected the plea, stating that "allowing one to die amounts to actively supporting taking away one's life".

== Gallery ==
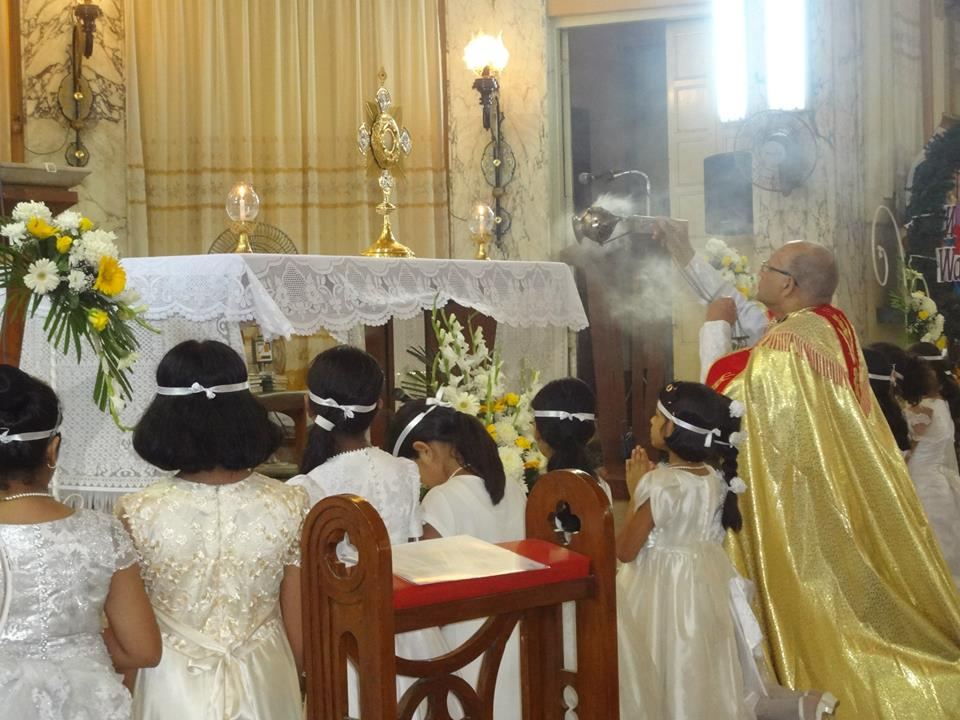
Gracias at St. Peter's Church, Bandra – incensing the Blessed Sacrament during Benediction

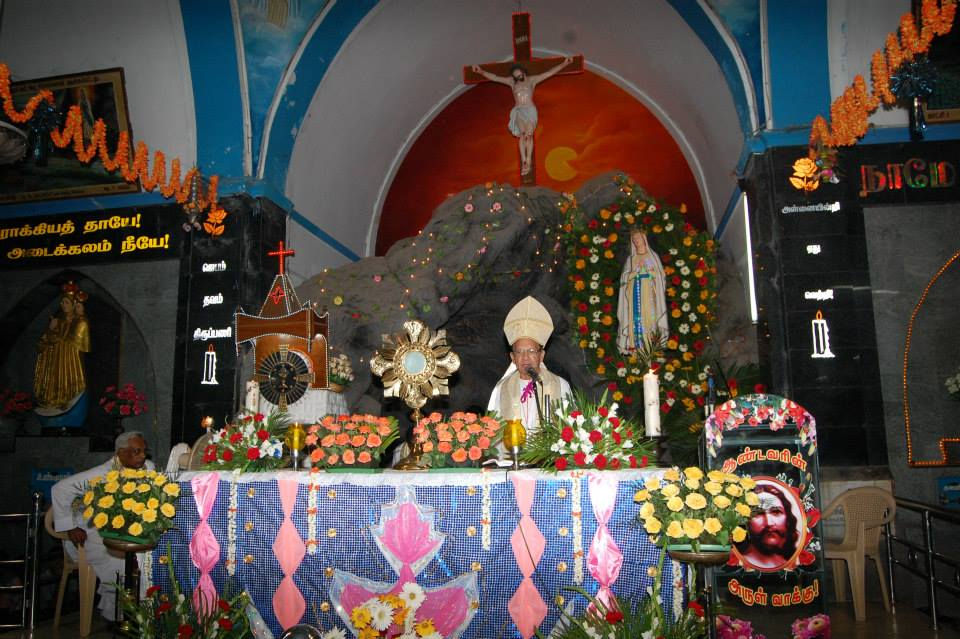
Benediction sermon at Villianur Shrine, Puducherry

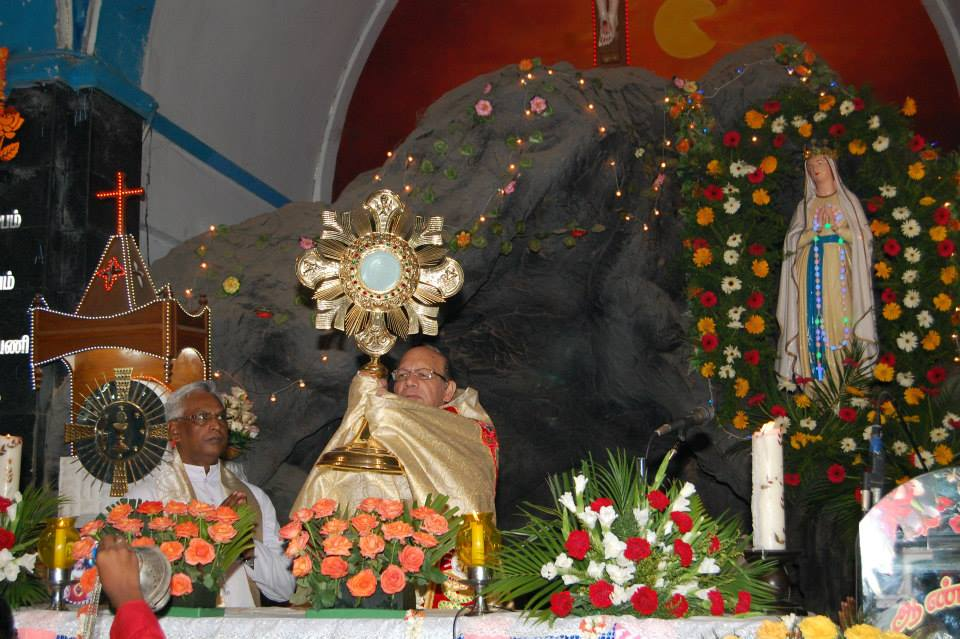
Benediction of the Blessed Sacrament

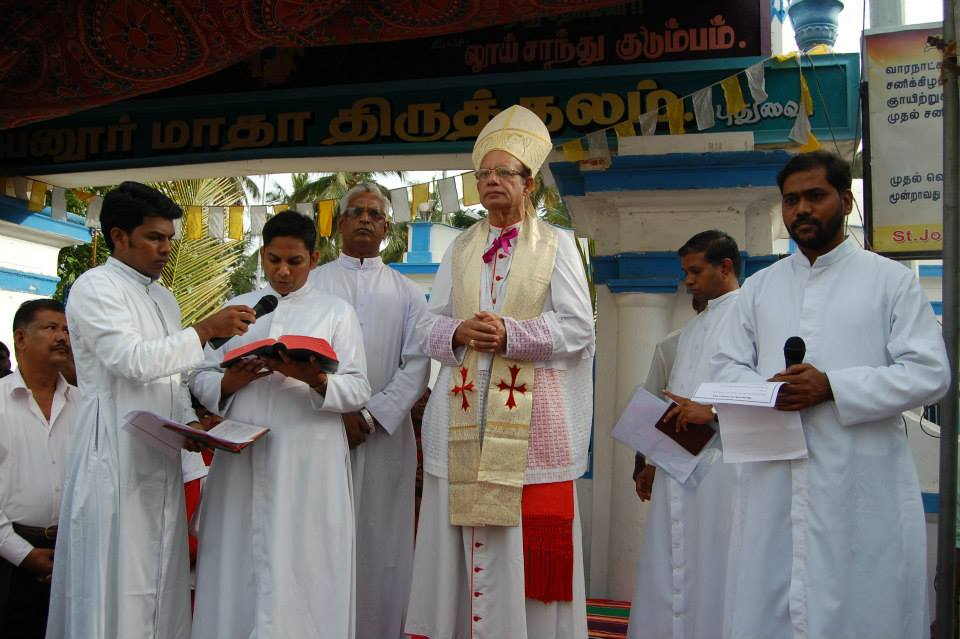
Blessing of the new gate

== Arms ==
Coat of arms of Oswald Gracias
Notes The coat of arms was designed and adopted when he was appointed as the Auxiliary Bishop of Bombay. Adopted 16 September 1997 Escutcheon Washing of the feet, Letter M, Scales of Justice and Handshake Motto To Reconcile All Things in Christ Symbolism Washing of the feet: symbolises a commitment to service; Letter M: Represents devotion to Mary; Scales of Justice: Church Law. His field of specialisation; Hand shake: stands for reconciliation and building bridges of communion

== Notes ==
Catholic Church titles
Preceded by Benjamin David de Jesus	— TITULAR — Titular Bishop of Bladia; 28 June 1997 – 7 September 2000	Succeeded by António Augusto dos Santos Marto
Preceded by Vincent Michael Conçessao	Archbishop of Agra; 7 September 2000 – 14 October 2006	Succeeded by Albert D'Souza
New title	Second Vice-President of the 'Vox Clara' Committee; 22 April 2002 –	Incumbent
Preceded by Telesphore Placidus Toppo	President of the Conference of Catholic Bishops of India; 2005 – 12 January 2011	Succeeded by Telesphore Placidus Toppo
Preceded by Ivan Dias	Archbishop of Bombay; 14 October 2006 – 25 January 2025	Succeeded by John Rodrigues
Preceded by Louis-Albert Vachon	Cardinal-Priest of San Paolo della Croce a Corviale; 24 November 2007 –	Incumbent
Preceded by Vincent Michael Conçessao	Vice-President of the Catholic Bishops' Conference of India; 19 February 2008 – 1 March 2010	Succeeded by Baselios Cleemis Thottunkal
Preceded by Varkey Vithayathil	President of the Catholic Bishops' Conference of India; 1 March 2010 – 12 February 2014	Succeeded by Baselios Cleemis Thottunkal
Preceded by Orlando Beltran Quevedo	President of the Federation of Asian Bishops' Conferences; 21 October 2011 – 1 January 2019	Succeeded by Charles Maung Bo
Preceded by Telesphore Placidus Toppo	President of the Conference of Catholic Bishops of India; February 2013 – 12 January 2019	Succeeded by Filipe Neri António Sebastião do Rosário Ferrão
Preceded by Baselios Cleemis Thottunkal	President of the Catholic Bishops' Conference of India; 9 February 2018 – 10 November 2022	Succeeded by Andrews Thazhath
