= Diocese of Pune =

Diocese of Pune may refer to:

- Roman Catholic Diocese of Poona
- Diocese of Pune (Church of North India)
