= Thomas Bhalerao =

The Most Reverend Thomas Bhalerao S.J.
- Bishop Emeritus of Nashik
- Church: Roman Catholic Church
- Archdiocese: Archdiocese of Bombay
- Province: Bombay
- Metropolis: Bombay
- Diocese: Roman Catholic Diocese of Nashik
- See: Roman Catholic Diocese of Nashik (emeritus)
- Installed: 31 March 2007
- Term ended: 13 February 2015
- Successor: Bishop Valerian D’Souza
- Other post: Bishop of Nashik.^{(1987-2007)}

Orders
- Ordination: 27 March 1965
- Consecration: 23 August 1987 by Archbishop Simon Pimenta
- Rank: Bishop-Priest

Personal details
- Born: Thomas Bhalerao; 1 February 1933 Sangamner, Maharashtra.
- Died: 13 February 2015 (aged 82) St. Luke’s Hospital, Sreerampur, Maharashtra, India
- Buried: St. Mary’s Church, Sangamner, Ahmednagar, Maharashtra; 19.5612°N 74.2187°E
- Denomination: Roman Catholic
- Residence: Sreerampur

Styles of Thomas Bhalerao
- Reference style: Bishop
- Spoken style: Your Excellency
- Religious style: The Most Reverend

Ordination history of Thomas Bhalerao
History
Priestly ordination
- Date: 27 March 1965
Episcopal consecration
- Principal consecrator: Archbishop Simon Ignatius Pimenta
- Co-consecrators: Bishop Valerian D’Souza, Bishop Charles Gomes, S.J.
- Date: 23 August 1987

Thomas Bhalerao (1 February 1933 – 13 February 2015 ) was an Indian Jesuit priest and, from 1987, the Roman Catholic bishop of Nashik.

Ordained to the priesthood in the Society of Jesus in 1965, Bhalerao was named bishop of the Roman Catholic Diocese of Nashik, India, in 1987. He resigned in 2007.
