= Bocconia =

Bocconia may refer to:

- Bocconia (plant), a genus of flowering plants in the poppy family, Papaveraceae
- Bocconia, Numidia, an ancient city and former bishopric in Numidia, now a Latin Catholic titular see
