= Ferdinand Joseph Fonseca =

Roman Catholic bishop

The Most Reverend Ferdinand Fonseca D.D.
- Auxiliary Bishop Emeritus of Bombay
- Church: Roman Catholic Church
- Archdiocese: Archdiocese of Bombay
- Province: Bombay
- Metropolis: Bombay
- See: Bombay (emeritus)
- Installed: 2 December 2000
- Term ended: 02 October 2015
- Successor: Bishop Agnelo Rufino Gracias
- Other post: Titular Bishop of Aquae in Mauretania.^{(1980-2015)}
- Previous posts: Titular Bishop of Aquæ in Mauretania.^{(1980-2015)} Auxiliary Bishop of Bombay.^{(1980-200)}

Orders
- Ordination: 5 December 1954
- Consecration: 29 June 1980 by Archbishop Simon Pimenta
- Rank: Bishop-Priest

Personal details
- Born: Ferdinand Joseph Fonseca; 2 December 1925 Umerkhadi, Bombay.
- Died: 2 October 2015 (aged 89) Holy Family Hospital Mumbai, Maharashtra, India
- Buried: St Peter's Cemetery, Haines Road. Mumbai; 18.9927°N 72.8210°E
- Denomination: Roman Catholic
- Residence: Mumbai, India
- Parents: Jose Fonseca^{(Father)} Julia Fonseca^{(Mother)}
- Education: St. Joseph's High School, Umerkhadi. St Xavier's College. St Pius X Seminary Mumbai.

Styles of Ferdinand Joseph Fonseca
- Reference style: Bishop
- Spoken style: Your Excellency
- Religious style: The Most Reverend

Ferdinand Joseph Fonseca (December 2, 1925 – October 2, 2015) was a Roman Catholic bishop.

Ordained to the priesthood in 1954, Fonseca was named auxiliary bishop for the Roman Catholic Archdiocese of Bombay, India in 1980 and retired in 2000.
