= Simon Pimenta =

Catholic cardinal (1920–2013)

His Eminence Simon Ignatius Cardinal Pimenta
- Cardinal; Archbishop Emeritus of Bombay
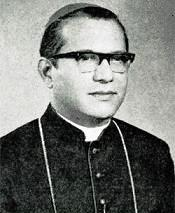
- Simon Ignatius Pimenta
- Church: Roman Catholic Church
- Archdiocese: Archdiocese of Bombay
- Province: Bombay
- Metropolis: Bombay
- See: Bombay (emeritus)
- Installed: 11 September 1978
- Term ended: 8 November 1996
- Predecessor: Cardinal Valerian Gracias
- Successor: Ivan Dias
- Other post: Cardinal-Priest of S. Maria Regina Mundi a Torre Spaccata ^{(1988-2013)}
- Previous posts: Titular Bishop of Bocconia.^{(1971-1977)} Auxiliary Bishop of Bombay.^{(1971-1977)} Coadjutor Archbishop of Bombay.^{(1977-1978)} President of Catholic Bishops' Conference of India.^{(1982-1988)} Archbishop of Bombay.^{(1978-1996)}

Orders
- Ordination: 21 December 1949
- Consecration: 29 June 1971 by Archbishop Valerian Cardinal Gracias
- Created cardinal: 28 June 1988 by Pope John Paul II
- Rank: Cardinal-Priest

Personal details
- Born: Simon Ignatius Pimenta; 1 March 1920 Marol, Bombay, Bombay Presidency, British Raj
- Died: 19 July 2013 (aged 93) Mumbai, Maharashtra, India
- Buried: St. John the Evangelist Church, Marol; 19.1130°N 72.8759°E
- Denomination: Roman Catholic
- Residence: Mumbai, India
- Parents: Joseph Pimenta (Father); Rosie Pimenta (Mother)
- Education: St Xavier's College. Pontifical Urban University.
- Motto: Rooted And Grounded in Love
- Coat of arms: Simon Ignatius Cardinal Pimenta's coat of arms

Styles of Simon Ignatius Pimenta
- Reference style: His Eminence
- Spoken style: Your Eminence
- Religious style: Cardinal
- Informal style: Cardinal
- See: Bombay (Emeritus)

Ordination history of Simon Pimenta
History
Priestly ordination
- Date: 21 December 1949
Episcopal consecration
- Principal consecrator: Valerian Cardinal Gracias
- Co-consecrators: Bishop Longinus Gabriel Pereira, Bishop William Zephyrine Gomes
- Date: 29 June 1971
Cardinalate
- Elevated by: Pope John Paul II
- Date: 28 June 1988
Episcopal succession
Bishops consecrated by Simon Pimenta as principal consecrator
- Ferdinand Joseph Fonseca: 29 June 1980
- Francis Leo Braganza: 29 June 1987
- Bosco Penha: 8 August 1987
- Thomas Bhalerao: 23 August 1987
- Ignatius D’Cunha: 3 April 1989
- Thomas Dabre: 27 May 1990
- Stanislaus Fernandes: 24 August 1990
- Edwin Colaço: 30 July 1995
- Bernard Blasius Moras: 25 February 1997
- Godfrey de Rozario: 28 December 1997

Simon Ignatius Pimenta (1 March 1920 – 19 July 2013) was a Roman Catholic Cardinal and Archbishop Emeritus of Bombay (now Mumbai).

== Early life ==
Born on 1 March 1920 in the village of Marol, in Bombay to Joseph and Rosie Pimenta, the young Simon Pimenta studied at the St John and then at St Xavier's College. He did his studies in philosophy and theology at the seminary of Bombay, St. Pius College and obtained a baccalaureate in pedagogy and mathematics from the State University.

== Priesthood ==
He was ordained a priest on 21 December 1949. In 1954 he obtained a doctorate in canon law from the Pontifical Urban University in Rome. Upon returning to Bombay, he served as assistant pastor, secretary to Cardinal Valerias Gracias, vice-chancellor, and defender of the bond. From 1959 to 1960 he was parish priest of the cathedral, professor of liturgy at the seminary, episcopal vicar for the formation of young priests and for the liturgy, and rector of the major seminary St. Pius X. At the same time, he also published some works. On 5 June 1971, he was appointed titular Bishop of Bocconia and Auxiliary of Bombay, receiving episcopal ordination on 29 June of the same year. Some years later, on 26 February 1977, Paul VI nominated him Coadjutor Archbishop of Bombay and on 11 September 1978 he became Archbishop. As archbishop, he called for a special conference of religious and lay people, he was active in pastoral and charitable activities like managing hospitals and dispensaries, and dedicated much to Catholic education. He was President of the Catholic Bishops' Conference of India for three consecutive terms until 1988. Cardinal Pimenta also served as a papally appointed synod president during the 1990 Synod of Bishops on priestly formation and led the Indian bishops' conference for six years.

== Later years and death ==
Being an East Indian, Pimenta's mother tongue was Marathi and he strongly encouraged the use of Marathi at every opportunity. In Vasai, he did not establish English language schools to avoid what he felt would be a dilution of culture. He understood the needs and desires of society and worked his plans accordingly. He was known for trying to keep his sprawling and diverse archdiocese united and active, establishing parishes in the city's slums and trying to counter widespread contraception campaigns by promoting natural family planning. Created cardinal by John Paul II in the consistory of 28 June 1988, he received the titular church of Santa Maria Regina Mundi in Torre Spaccata and continued his pastoral work until 8 November 1996, when he retired from office, as Cardinal at the age of 75 to make way for Ivan Dias. Cardinal Simon Ignatius Pimenta died on 19 July 2013, while he was resting at the Clergy Home in Bandstand, Bandra, having moved here as his apartment at the Archbishop's House was undergoing repair. The end came around 9 pm at Clergy Home where the cardinal was recuperating from age-related ailments. Auxiliary bishop Fr.Dominic Savio Fernandes said the cardinal was well all day. "He had eaten his dinner and was resting when one of the nurses in the home found him slumped in his chair. A doctor was quickly summoned but the end had come by then," he said.

== Funeral ==
The last rites of archbishop emeritus of Bombay, Cardinal Simon Pimenta, were performed on 23 July 2013, evening in his native parish of St John the Evangelist in Marol. Despite the rain, nearly 5,000 mourners, led by Archbishop Oswald Cardinal Gracias, paid respects to the priest who "lived his life" in the service of the faith. The mortal remains of Cardinal Simon Pimenta, was placed for public homage at Holy Name Cathedral, Colaba, on 23 July 2013 at 10 am. Archbishop Cardinal Oswald Gracias celebrated the funeral Mass at the cathedral, and conducted the funeral rites at the occasion. The mortal remains were again placed at Cardinal Simon's ancestral house at Marol, Andheri (East), where he was born and brought up. The mortal remains were taken in a grand procession from the residence to the local St John the Evangelist Church, where the mortal remains of Cardinal Pimenta were buried ceremoniously in the Church cemetery. The state health minister Suresh H Shetty, MP Priya Dutt and others condoled the demise of Cardinal Pimenta.

Catholic Church titles
Preceded by Valerian Gracias	Archbishop of Bombay; 11 September 1978 – 8 November 1996	Succeeded by Ivan Dias
