= Louis-Albert Vachon =

Catholic cardinal

- Cardinal-Priest of San Paolo della Croce a Corviale
- Church: Catholic Church
- See: San Paolo della Croce a Corviale
- In office: 25 May 1985 – 29 September 2006
- Predecessor: Position established
- Successor: Oswald Gracias
- Previous posts: Archbishop of Québec (1981-1990); Titular Bishop of Mesarfelta (1977-1981); Auxiliary Bishop of Québec (1977-1981)

Orders
- Ordination: 11 June 1938 by Jean-Marie-Rodrigue Villeneuve
- Consecration: 14 May 1977 by Maurice Roy

Personal details
- Born: 4 February 1912 Saint-Frédéric, Québec, Canada
- Died: 29 September 2006 (aged 94) Quebec City, Québec, Canada

Styles of Louis-Albert Cardinal Vachon
- Reference style: His Eminence
- Spoken style: Your Eminence
- Informal style: Cardinal
- See: Québec

Louis-Albert Vachon, CC OQ (February 4, 1912 – September 29, 2006) was a Canadian educator, cardinal of the Roman Catholic Church, and Archbishop of Quebec.

He became a cardinal on May 25, 1985.

== History ==
Vachon was born and raised in Saint-Frédéric, Quebec, one of a family of six. He earned a Bachelor of Arts degree from the Minor Seminary of Quebec in 1934 and studied theology at the Major Seminary of Quebec before being ordained by Jean-Marie-Rodrigue Cardinal Villeneuve on June 11, 1938. He then attended Université Laval, graduating in 1941 with a PhD in philosophy. He taught philosophy at Université Laval from 1941 to 1947, then began studies at the Pontifical Athenaeum Angelicum in Rome, Italy, where he was awarded a doctorate degree in theology in 1949 with a dissertation entitled "La vertu d'espérance et le péché de présomption : leur nature et leur opposition mutuelle."

Father Vachon returned to Quebec in 1949 to take up the position of Professor of Theology, a position he held from 1949 to 1955. In that year he was nominated as Rector of the Grand Seminary of Quebec and vice-rector of the Université Laval. In 1958 he was appointed Domestic Prelate of His Holiness under Pope John XXIII, a title that gave Vachon the rank and style of monsignor.

In 1960 Vachon was asked to assume the position of rector of the University of Laval; he held this position until 1972. He served in various positions with the Roman Catholic Archdiocese of Quebec until he was elected Titular Bishop of Mesarfelta and appointed Auxiliary of Quebec on April 4, 1977. He was consecrated on May 14 of that year in Quebec. Vachon was elected Archbishop of Quebec on March 20, 1981, on the retirement of the previous archbishop, Maurice Cardinal Roy, and created Cardinal-Priest by Pope John Paul II in the consistory of May 25, 1985. He received the red biretta and the title of San Paolo della Croce a Corviale on that day.

Vachon resigned the pastoral government of the Archdiocese and became Archbishop Emeritus of Quebec on March 17, 1990. Following his retirement, he lived in Quebec City and later in Beauport, Quebec. He died on September 29, 2006, in Quebec City.

He was made a Companion of the Order of Canada in 1969, and an Officer of the National Order of Quebec in 1985.

Catholic Church titles
Preceded by Maurice Roy	Archbishop of Quebec; 1981–1990	Succeeded by Maurice Couture
