= Bocconia, Numidia =

Bocconia was an ancient city and former bishopric in Roman North Africa, which only remains a Latin Catholic titular see.

== History ==
Bocconia was among the cities of sufficient importance to become a suffragan diocese in the Roman province of Numidia, in the papal sway, but faded so completely, probably at the 7th century advent of Islam, than even its precise location in present Algeria is unclear.

Its only historically documented bishops were :

- Donatus, partaking as Donatist schismatic bishop (without Catholic counterpart) at the Council of Carthage called in 411, precisely on that heresy.
- Vitalianus, Catholic bishop at the Council of Carthage called in 484 by king Huneric of the Vandal Kingdom, presumably exiled afterward.

== Titular see ==
The diocese was nominally restored in 1933 as Latin titular bishopric of Bocconia (Latin = Curiate Italian) / Bocconien(sis) (Latin).

It has had the following incumbents, of the fitting Episcopal (lowest) rank :

- Thomas F. Quinlan (구 토마), Columban Missionaries (S.S.C.M.E.) (1965.11.16 – death 1970.12.31) as emeriate; previously first and only Apostolic Prefect of Shunsen (South Korea) (1940–1943 and 1948.11.12 – 1950.07.16), (see) restyled first and only Apostolic Prefect of Shunsen (South Korea) (1950.07.16 – 1955.09.20), (see) promoted first and only Apostolic Vicar of Chuncheon 춘천 (1955.09.20 – 1962.03.10), President of Catholic Bishops’ Conference of Korea (1959–1964), (see) promoted first Bishop of Chuncheon 춘천 (1962.03.10 – 1965.11.16)
- Simon Ignatius Pimenta (1971.06.05 – 1977.02.26) as Auxiliary Bishop of Archdiocese of Bombay (India) (1971.06.05 – 1977.02.26); later Coadjutor Archbishop of Bombay (1977.02.26 – 1978.09.11), Metropolitan Archbishop of Bombay (1978.09.11 – retired 1996.11.08), President of Catholic Bishops' Conference of India (1982–1988 and 1993–1997), created Cardinal-Priest of S. Maria «Regina Mundi» a Torre Spaccata (1988.06.28 – death 2013.07.19)
- Ernest Mesmin Lucien Cabo (1983.07.02 – 1984.07.02) as Auxiliary Bishop of Diocese of Basse-Terre (Guadeloupe, French Antilles) (1983.07.02 – 1984.07.02); next succeeded as Bishop of Basse-Terre (1984.07.02 – 2008.05.15)
- Gregory Taik Maung (1984.11.08 – ...), as Auxiliary Bishop of Diocese of Pyay (Burma = Myanmar) (1984.11.08 – retired 2010.07.16) and Apostolic Administrator sede plena of Pyay (1991 – 2010.07.16), next as emeritate.

== See also ==
- List of Catholic dioceses in Algeria

== Sources and external links ==
- GCatholic

Bibliography

- Pius Bonifacius Gams, Series episcoporum Ecclesiae Catholicae, Leipzig 1931, p. 464
- Stefano Antonio Morcelli, Africa christiana, Volume I, Brescia 1816, p. 104
- Auguste Audollent, lemma 'Bocconiensis' in Dictionnaire d'Histoire et de Géographie ecclésiastiques, vol. IX, 1937, col. 311
