= Diocese of Vasai =

Roman Catholic diocese in Maharashtra, India

Coordinates: 19.3511°N 72.8119°E

Diocese of Vasai Dioecesis Vasaiensis वसई के सूबा
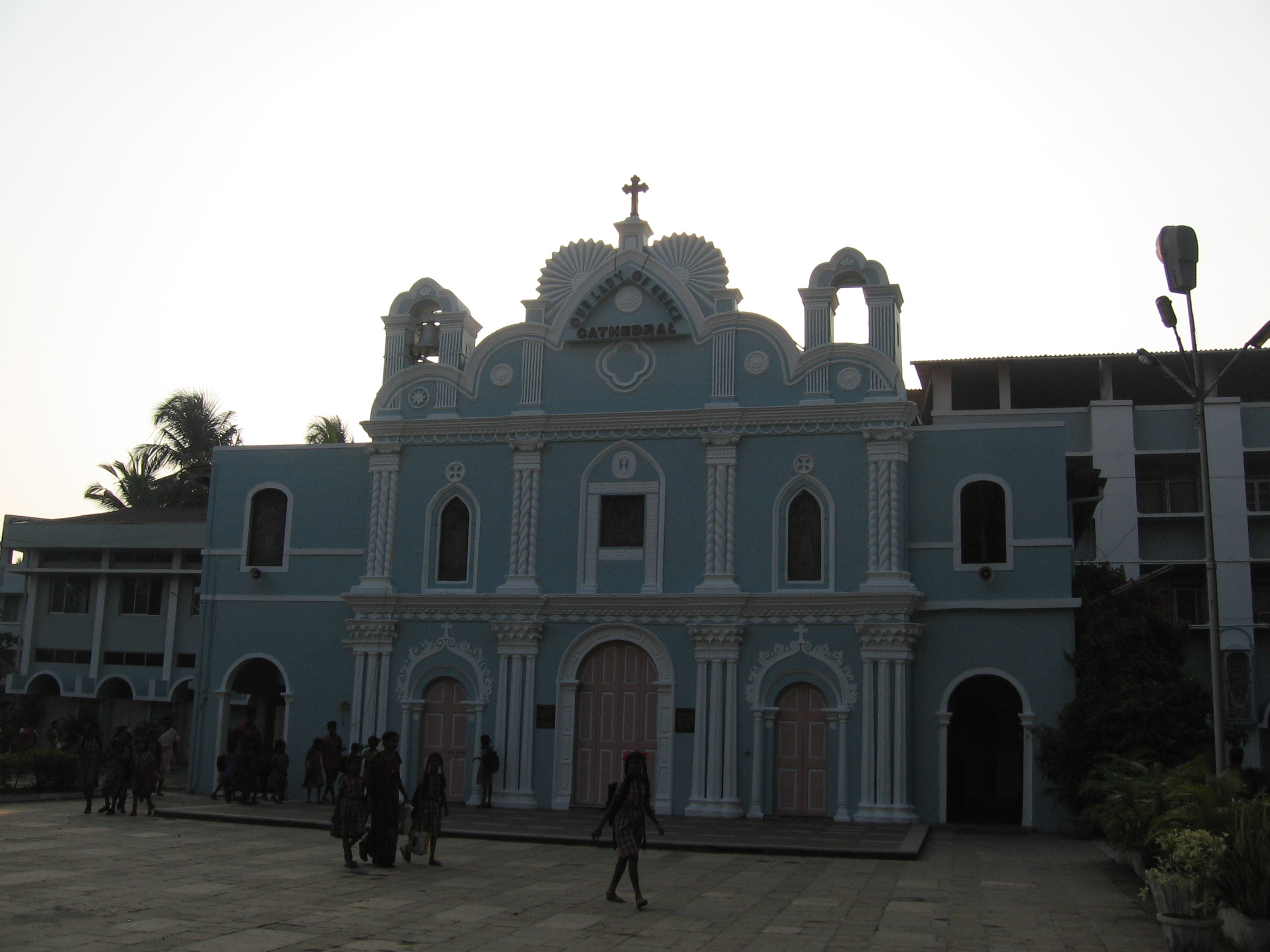
- The cathedral of Vasai, Our Lady of Graces

Location
- Country: India
- Ecclesiastical province: Mumbai
- Metropolitan: Mumbai

Statistics
- Area: 7,596 km^{2} (2,933 sq mi)
- Population: Total; Catholics: (as of 2010); 3,625,000; 135,677 (3.7%)

Information
- Denomination: Roman Catholic
- Rite: Latin Rite
- Cathedral: Cathedral of Our Lady of Grace in Papdy

Current leadership
- Pope: Leo XIV
- Bishop: Thomas D’Souza
- Metropolitan Archbishop: John Rodrigues

The Roman Catholic Diocese of Vasai (Latin: Vasaien(sis)) is a diocese located in the city of Vasai in the ecclesiastical province of Bombay in India.

== History ==
The history of Vasai is as old as Christianity itself. Tradition has it that St. Bartholomeo – the apostle of Christ – came to Kalyan which forms part of Thane district in which the Diocese of Vasai is situated. In the 6th century, Kalyan had a bishop elected and sent from Persia. Jordenus worked as a Dominican priest for a brief period in a church at Sopara in 1321 in this diocese when he had come just as a father before he was appointed as the first Bishop of Quilon.

In 1534, the Portuguese moved to Vasai from Cochin and Goa. In 1536, they put up a church in Vasai Fort dedicated to Our Lady of Life. There was also a parish church under the title of St. Joseph. This church was known as the 'Se' or 'Seat of the Bishop.' Whenever the Bishop of Goa visited Vasai that was the church from where he officiated.

With the arrival of the Portuguese fathers, the Franciscans, Dominicans, Jesuits, Augustinians, they started sending their fathers to Vasai. (The Brothers of St. John of God were also among them). They erected three big churches in North Vasai and about five churches in South Vasai. There were churches built by them in Palghar and Dahanu Talukas. Today, they do not exist anymore. The Catholics of the former eight churches are being served today by the 33 ecclesiastical units which form the major part of this diocese.

The Church in this diocese had its ups and downs during the 18th–20th centuries, i.e. during the Maratha and the British rule, but the priests that came from Goa kept up the faith when the European fathers were driven away. The local priests coming from the East Indian community were among the first ones to help the Goan priests in preserving the faith of the people of this area which they had received from the Portuguese in the 16th century.

The new Diocese of Vasai was created on May 22, 1998, by Pope John Paul II. The good tidings of the creation of the new diocese were joyfully announced by Cardinal Ivan Dias, on Sunday, June 28, 1998, the eve of the feast of the Apostles, Sts. Peter and Paul, at the Shrine dedicated to Our Lady of Remedy. The installation ceremony of Father Thomas Dabre as the First Bishop of the new Diocese took place at the new Cathedral of Our Lady of Grace, Papdy, on Aug. 15, 1998. On April 4, 2009, Bishop Dabre was transferred to the diocese of Poona.

Archbishop Machado of Nashik diocese was transferred to the diocese of Vasai on November 10, 2009, and was installed on December 19, 2009.

== Leadership ==
- Thomas Dabre (22 May 1998 – 4 April 2009)
- Felix Machado (19 December 2009 – 6 June 2024)
- Thomas D’Souza (15 December 2024)

== Language ==
Samvedi, Kupari, Wadval, Marathi, Konkani, Kannada, Tamil, Malayalam, Hindi, English and Varli are the languages used in the diocesan territory.

== Saints and causes for canonisation ==
- St. Bartholomew the Apostle is considered to have come to Kalyan which forms part of Thane district in which the Diocese of Vasai is situated.
- St. Gonsalo Garcia was a native of Vasai.
