= Ivan Dias =

Indian Catholic prelate (1936–2017)

His Eminence Ivan Cornelius Dias JCD
- Prefect of the Congregation for the Evangelization of Peoples
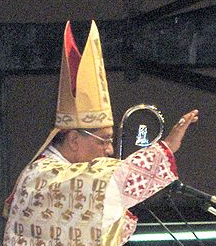
- Church: Catholic Church; Latin Church
- Archdiocese: Bombay
- Installed: 20 May 2006
- Term ended: 10 May 2011
- Predecessor: Crescenzio Sepe
- Successor: Fernando Filoni
- Other post: Cardinal priest of Spirito Santo alla Ferratella
- Previous posts: Titular Archbishop of Rusibisir (1981‍–‍1996); Apostolic Pro-Nuncio to Ghana, Togo and Benin (1981‍–‍1986); Apostolic Nuncio to Korea (1986‍–‍1991); Apostolic Nuncio to Albania (1991‍–‍1996); Archbishop of Bombay (1996‍–‍2006)

Orders
- Ordination: 8 December 1958 by Valerian Gracias
- Consecration: 19 June 1981 by Agostino Casaroli
- Created cardinal: 21 February 2001 by Pope John Paul II
- Rank: Cardinal priest

Personal details
- Born: Ivan Cornelius Dias; 14 April 1936 Bandra, Bombay, Bombay Presidency, British India
- Died: 19 June 2017 (aged 81) Rome, Italy
- Buried: Campo Verano; 41.9015°N 12.5203°E
- Denomination: Roman Catholic
- Parents: Carlo Nazaro Dias; Maria Martins Dias
- Education: St. Stanislaus High School, Mumbai
- Motto: Servus (Latin for 'Servant')
- Signature: Ivan Cornelius Dias's signature

- Coat of arms: Ivan Cornelius Dias's coat of arms

Styles of Ivan Cornelius Dias
- Reference style: His Eminence
- Spoken style: Your Eminence
- Religious style: Cardinal
- Informal style: Cardinal
- See: Bombay (Emeritus)

Ordination history of Ivan Dias
History
Priestly ordination
- Ordained by: Valerian Gracias
- Date: 8 December 1958
Episcopal consecration
- Principal consecrator: Agostino Casaroli
- Co-consecrators: Achille Silvestrini, Duraisamy Simon Lourdusamy
- Date: 19 June 1982
- Place: St. Peter's Basilica, Vatican City
Cardinalate
- Elevated by: Pope John Paul II
- Date: 21 February 2001
Episcopal succession
Bishops consecrated by Ivan Dias as principal consecrator
- Oswald Gracias: 16 September 1997
- Percival Joseph Fernandez: 21 April 2001
- Agnelo Rufino Gracias: 21 April 2001
- George Antonysamy: 21 September 2005
- António Francisco Jaca, S.V.D.: 22 July 2007
- Yves Marie Monot: 7 September 2008

Ivan Cornelius Dias (14 April 1936 – 19 June 2017) was an Indian prelate and cardinal of the Catholic Church. He was Prefect of the Congregation for the Evangelization of Peoples from 2006 to 2011, Archbishop of Bombay from 1996 to 2006, and before that a papal ambassador in the Balkans, East Asia, and West Africa. He was elevated to the rank of cardinal in 2001.

== Biography ==
=== Early life and ordination ===
Ivan Dias was born in Bandra, a suburb of Bombay, to Carlos Nazario Dias (d. 1953) and Maria Dias (d. 1991), both natives of Goa. Dias' ancestral village is Velsao, Salcete, Goa. His father was undersecretary of the Home Department of the government of Maharashtra. The second oldest of four children, he has three brothers: Francis (a retired lieutenant general in the Indian military), Ralph and Olaf (a doctor). After graduating from the Jesuit St. Stanislaus High School, he entered the seminary of the Archdiocese of Bombay and was later ordained to the priesthood by Valerian Gracias on 8 December 1958. He then did pastoral work in Bombay as curate at St. Stephen's Church until 1961, when he was sent to Rome to further his studies. He there attended the Pontifical Ecclesiastical Academy and the Pontifical Lateran University, from where he obtained a doctorate in canon law in 1964.

=== Secretariat of State ===
Dias worked in the Vatican Secretariat of State preparing the 1964 visit of Pope Paul VI to India, during which he was raised to the rank of Privy Chamberlain of His Holiness on 4 December. From 1965 to 1973, he served as secretary of the nunciatures in Denmark, Sweden, Norway, Iceland, Finland, Indonesia, Madagascar, Réunion, the Comoro Islands and Mauritius. Returning to the Secretariat of State in Vatican City, he was head of the section for the Soviet Union, the Baltic states, Belarus, Ukraine, Poland, Bulgaria, China, Vietnam, Laos, Cambodia, South Africa, Namibia, Lesotho, Swaziland, Zimbabwe, Ethiopia, Rwanda, Burundi, Uganda, Zambia, Kenya and Tanzania until 1981.

=== Nuncio and bishop ===
On 8 May 1981, Dias was appointed Titular Archbishop of Rusibisir and Apostolic Pro-Nuncio to Ghana, Togo and Benin by Pope John Paul II. He received his episcopal consecration on the following 19 June from Cardinal Agostino Casaroli, with Archbishops Achille Silvestrini and Duraisamy Simon Lourdusamy serving as co-consecrators, at St. Peter's Basilica. He selected as his episcopal motto: "Servus" (Latin: "Servant"). Dias was later named Apostolic Nuncio to Korea on 20 June 1986, and Apostolic Nuncio to Albania on 28 October 1991. In Albania, he was charged with rebuilding the local church after nearly five decades of communist rule, inviting foreign missionaries to the country and working with the Albanian government to recover Catholic churches and schools.

=== Archbishop ===
Recalled from the Vatican's diplomatic service, Dias was appointed the ninth Archbishop of Bombay on 8 November 1996. He was an outspoken supporter of the controversial 2000 document of the Congregation for the Doctrine of the Faith Dominus Iesus, which declared that non-Catholics "are in a gravely deficient situation in comparison with those who, in the Church, have the fullness of the means of salvation." Dias said the document was "a reaffirmation...[that] Jesus is the only savior of the world. We have a right to say who we are, and others can accept it or not."

=== Cardinal ===
John Paul II appointed him Cardinal-Priest of Spirito Santo alla Ferratella in the consistory of 21 February 2001. He was shortly afterwards named to the Council of Cardinals for the Study of the Organizational and Economic Problems of the Holy See on 10 March 2001, and served as one of the three presidents at the 10th Ordinary Assembly of the World Synod of Bishops from September to October 2001.

In 2003, he delivered the homily at the beatification Mass of Mother Teresa, whom Dias had befriended during his tenure as a nuncio in Albania; he once said, "Reaching out to our fellow human beings, embracing the poor as Mother Teresa did, must become a common service for every Christian." Lamenting the domination of the world "by information technology, by New Age teaching and by the decline of ethical values," Dias once stated that entire countries are being "crushed down by godless ideologies and enticing proposals that exalt the anti-God cultures, including the culture of death." He was one of the Cardinals considered papabile at the 2005 Papal conclave that selected Pope Benedict XVI. TIME Magazine noted his "[s]trong diplomatic experience" and said his election "would represent a bold choice from the developing world."

On 20 May 2006, he was appointed Prefect of the Congregation for the Evangelization of Peoples, the top post overseeing the Catholic missions. He was also ex officio the Grand Chancellor of the Pontifical Urbaniana University. He presented his resignation as required on reaching the age of 75. It was accepted on 10 May 2011 when he was succeeded as Prefect by Fernando Filoni.

Cardinal Dias was a member of the Congregation for the Doctrine of the Faith, the Congregation for Divine Worship and the Discipline of the Sacraments, the Congregation for the Oriental Churches, the Congregation for Catholic Education, the Pontifical Council for Culture, the Pontifical Council for the Laity, the Pontifical Council for Promoting Christian Unity, the Pontifical Council for Interreligious Dialogue, the Pontifical Council for Social Communications, the Pontifical Commission for the Cultural Heritage of the Church and the Pontifical Council for Legislative Texts.

Dias was one of the cardinal electors who participated in the 2013 papal conclave that selected Pope Francis.

Dias died in Rome on 19 June 2017.

== Views ==
=== Anti-Christian violence ===
During his tenure as Archbishop, Dias frequently condemned anti-Christian discrimination in Indian society by Hindu fundamentalists. In December 2001, he invited leaders of all Bombay's religious communities to his home for "a meeting for peace in a world torn apart by war and hatred." In 2002, he denounced pressures put by Indian authorities on Catholic schools, which have "had to put up with uncooperative and abusive public officials as well intimidation."

=== Abortion and homosexuality ===
Dias also established himself as theologically conservative, strongly maintaining the Church's stances against abortion and homosexuality. He believed that gays and lesbians could be "cured" of their "unnatural tendencies" through the Sacrament of Penance.

=== Anglican communion ===
During a speech he gave at the Lambeth Conference, he expressed unrestrained disapproval of the changes the Anglican communion was experiencing. He said: "When we live myopically in the fleeting present, oblivious of our past heritage and apostolic traditions, we could well be suffering from spiritual Alzheimer's. [...] or ecclesial Parkinson's".

Catholic Church titles
Preceded by Crescenzio Sepe	Prefect of the Congregation for the Evangelization of Peoples; 20 May 2006 – 10 May 2011	Succeeded by Fernando Filoni
Preceded by Simon Pimenta	Archbishop of Bombay; 8 November 1996 – 20 May 2006	Succeeded by Oswald Gracias
