= Gonsalo Garcia =

Friar Minor, martyr and saint

Saint Gonsalo Garcia O.F.M.
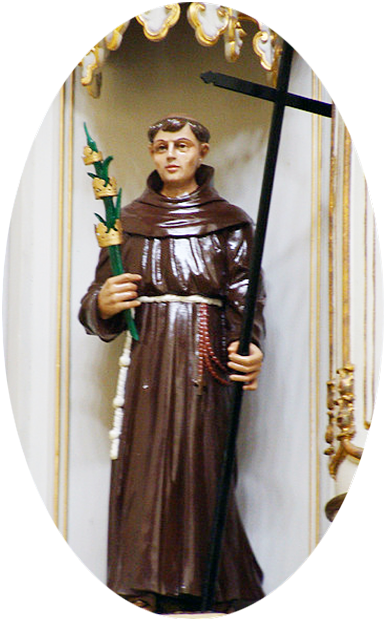
- St Gonsalo Garcia of Bassein
- Born: 1556/1557; Bassein (Baçaim), Portuguese India/Deccan Sultanates
- Died: 5 February 1597 (aged 40); Nagasaki, Japan
- Venerated in: Catholic Church
- Beatified: 14 September 1627 by Pope Urban VIII
- Canonized: 8 June 1862 by Pope Pius IX
- Major shrine: St. Gonsalo Garcia Church; Gass, Vasai, India
- Feast: 6 February (along with other martyrs), 7 February (in India)
- Patronage: Roman Catholic Archdiocese of Bombay, Indian Catholic Youth Movement (ICYM); East Indian Community

Gonsalo Garcia, O.F.M. (Portuguese: Gonçalo Garcia; 1556 – 5 February 1597) was a lay brother of the Franciscans from Portuguese Bombay and Bassein in early modern India. He died at the hands of Toyotomi Hideyoshi and was canonised along with his companions, the 26 Martyrs of Japan.

== Historical background ==
Bassein (Vasai) is about 30 miles north of Bombay. The Portuguese began their presence on the western coast of India with the arrival in 1498 of Vasco da Gama at the harbour of Calicut (Kozhikode). John III of Portugal appointed Nuno da Cunha as the Governor of Goa. Under his leadership, the Portuguese started attempts to conquer Diu from the sultan of Guzerat. Taking Bassein was part of this effort.

After a series of conflicts, Da Cunha took control of the town with the Treaty of Bassein in December 1534. Construction of the Fort of St Sebastian commenced in 1536. The area was prized for its timber for shipbuilding. Its fertility and position, together with its healthy climate, made it a commercial centre of some importance, and the home of many Portuguese noblemen. and took on characteristics of a European city.

The prosperity of Bassein increased such that it was considered among the richest cities among the Portuguese colonies in the world at that time. It became the capital of the Portuguese Province of the North of India; Goa being the capital of Portuguese Province of South. The Portuguese ruled the area for over 200 years.

== Biography ==
=== Early life ===
Garcia was born in 1557. Documents in the Lisbon Archives (ANTT) describe him as natural de Agaçaim (a resident of Agashi village) in Bassein. His father was a Portuguese soldier and his mother a Canarim as the Portuguese called the inhabitants of the Konkan. Modern scholars such as Gense and Conti accept the fact that Gonsalo's mother was from Bassein. As the child of a European father and an Indian mother he was a mestiço in the Portuguese sense of term.

The fort was reserved for the European people and their servants. According to the policy adopted by the Portuguese colonial government, any Portuguese who got married with a local woman was given certain privileges. So Garcia's father was permitted to quit the job and stayed in the fort as a civilian employee, and because of that his family came to reside inside the fort.

Garcia studied at the Jesuit school in Fort Bassein and helped in their Igreja do Santo Nome de Jesus (Church of the Holy Name of Jesus), now known as St. Gonsalo Garcia Church. Here Garcia came into contact with the Jesuit priest, Sebastião Gonsalves, who became a friend and guide throughout his life. During his stay with the Jesuits, he learned grammar, philosophy and Roman history.

=== Lay missionary ===
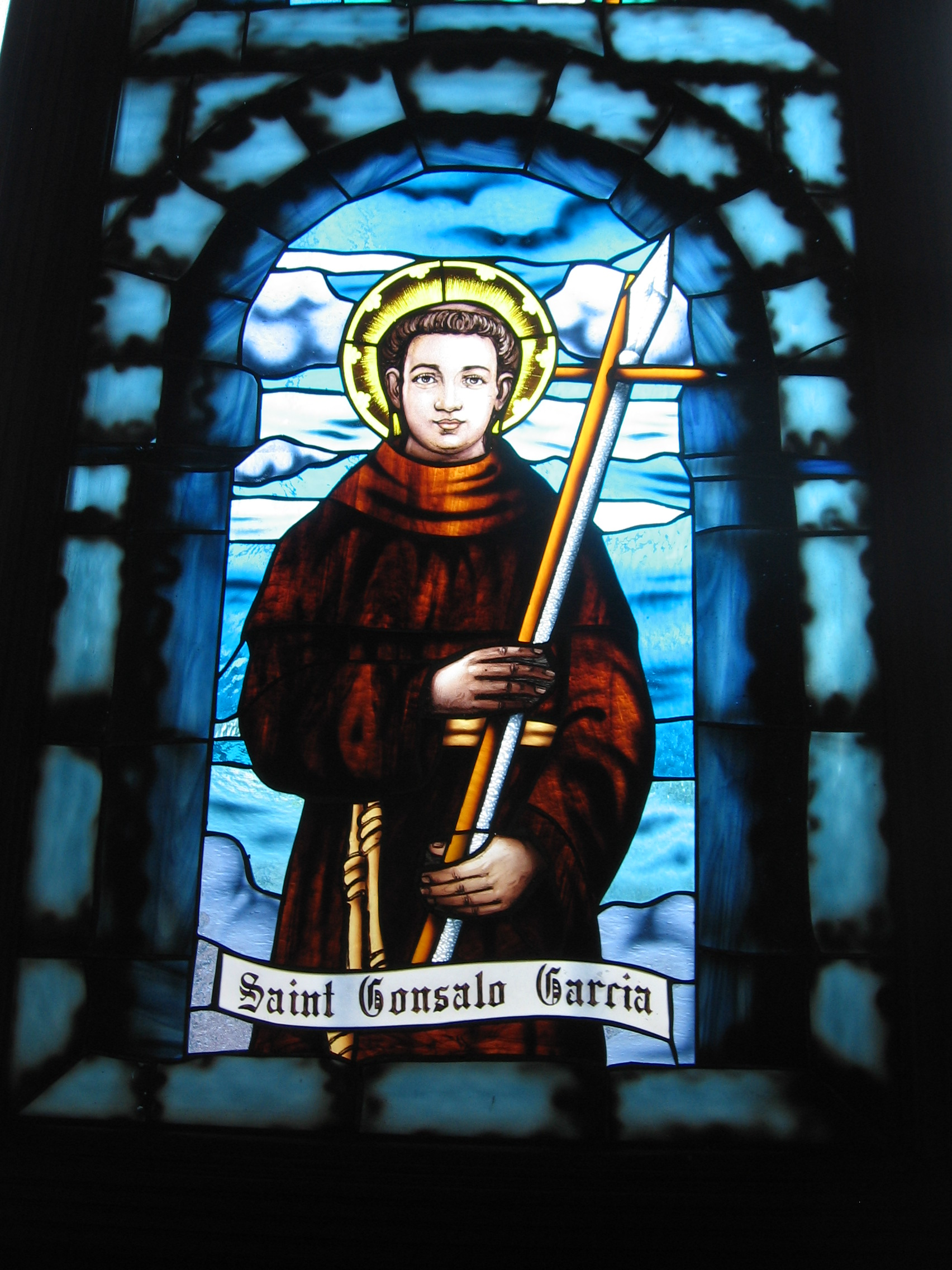
Window in the Cathedral of Pune

In 1580 Garcia left Bassein with some Jesuit missionaries headed to join their mission in Japan. He quickly acquired a knowledge of the language. As a missionary, he went about in public places drawing children to himself by his amiable disposition, by his fluency in the language of the country and by his kindness. He served faithfully as a catechist for eight years.

=== Missionary-turned-merchant ===
On leaving the Jesuits, Garcia went to the city of Alacao. There he established himself as a merchant. Gradually, his business transactions expanded and he was able to found new establishments. His commercial relations brought him into contact with all the ranks of Japanese society. The business flourished and he gained great wealth. During his frequent visits to Manila he made the acquaintance of the Franciscan Friars, and being drawn more and more towards them, he joined them as a lay brother.

=== A Franciscan preacher ===
Garcia was very much delighted when he was accepted into the Franciscan order. In Manila, he came into contact with the Franciscan missionary, Friar Pedro Bautista, who remained his companion until their shared death. Garcia started his career as a catechist in Manila. The main advantage for him was his ability to speak the Japanese language. From the different parts of Japan, people began to send him invitations to return. It was at this time that the King of Spain wanted to send a delegation to Japan. The Spanish Governor of Manila selected Peter Baptist as the leader of the delegation, and, since he did not know the Japanese language, Garcia was selected as his translator as well as his companion. Garcia was so happy with this offer that he immediately accepted the responsibility. The missionaries left Manila on 26 May 1592.

In Japan, Garcia became the center of attraction, as he knew the Japanese language well. After facing some initial difficulties the Franciscans settled in Japan and began their missionary work in Kyoto, Osaka, etc. The Japanese regent Toyotomi Hideyoshi was very friendly with these Franciscans. It was a time when Jesuits were facing lot of opposition in Japan. The people of Japan appreciated the simple way of living adopted by these Franciscan missionaries. It helped them to accelerate their conversion program. Many Japanese, including their overlords, began to accept Christianity. Slowly Japan became the great center of evangelization for the Franciscan missionaries.

=== Arrival in Japan ===
In October 1596, the Spanish ship San Felipe, bound from Manila to Acapulco, was driven by typhoons to the coast of Japan. It was laden with gold and silver when it beached on a sandbar in Urado Bay. The captain of the ship, Francisco de Olandia, while conversing with the Japanese customs officials, spoke of La Espanha de los Conquistadores and boasted that the King of Spain had captured many countries in the world. He told them that the King of Spain sent the missionaries first to instigate the people against their ruler. When the matter was reported to Toyotomi Hideyoshi, he became enraged. The situation was exploited by Yakuin Zenso, his physician and close advisor. He issued an order to arrest and execute all Christian missionaries in Japan. The Franciscans, including Bautista, Garcia and others were arrested on 8 December 1596 and were sentenced to death. There were three Jesuits also, including the native seminarian, Paul Miki.

=== Death by crucifixion ===
On 4 January the prisoners who had been sentenced to death began their journey from Kyoto. They traveled six hundred miles from Kyoto to Nagasaki through Sakai, Okayama, Hiroshima, Shimonoseki, and Karatsu. They reached Nagasaki on 4 February 1597. The next morning they were taken to a hill known as Nishigaoka. As Garcia was prominent among the missionaries, he was given the middle place. The execution started at 10 o'clock in the morning. He, Peter Baptist, and the other friars were crucified, along with fifteen teenage boys who were members of the Third Order of Saint Francis, as well as the three Jesuits.

The condemned were so tired that they could not endure it for long and within half an hour everything was over. The two soldiers who worked as executioners completed their task by stabbing their spears into the missionaries' chests. The Portuguese and Japanese Christians attending the execution broke past the guards and started soaking pieces of cloth in the blood of the executed, gathering lumps of the blood-soaked dirt, and tearing up their religious habits and kimono for holy relics. The guards beat the relic-hunters away and order was reestablished. Guards were positioned around the hill to keep onlookers at a distance.

== Veneration ==
In 1627, the twenty-six were declared venerable by Pope Urban VIII and permitted the Jesuits and the Franciscans to venerate them. In 1629 their veneration was permitted throughout the Universal Church.

The matter was neglected for more than two centuries. It was once again taken up in 1862 and on 8 June 1862 Pope Pius IX canonized Gonsalo Garcia and his co-martyrs as the 26 Martyrs of Japan. Brother Gonsalo Garcia became St. Gonsalo Garcia, the first Catholic saint of India and the Indian sub-continent, and 8 June 2012 marked the 150th anniversary of his canonization.

== Legacy ==
Garcia's memory is kept alive with a college named after him in Vasai. He is the patron saint of the Roman Catholic Diocese of Vasai and his feast day is a joint one for the group of martyrs, on 6 February (as the actual day of his death, 5 February, is the feast of St. Agatha). Thomas Dabre, the Bishop Emeritus of Vasai, says Garcia's relevance even today lies in the universalism of his charity and love. A small statue of Gonçalo Garcia was taken from Portugal to Recife in Brazil as early as 1745 by a local Brazilian because of his brown complexion (a further proof of his Indian ancestry), where his veneration soon took off.

== See also ==
- Cyril Bernard Papali

== Sources ==
- India's only canonized saint: St Gonsalo Garcia of Bassein. by Dr. Regin D’silva, St Gonsalo Garcia Publications, Bassein, pp95, 2003.
