= St. Patrick's Cathedral, Pune =

Church in Pune, India

St. Patrick's Cathedral
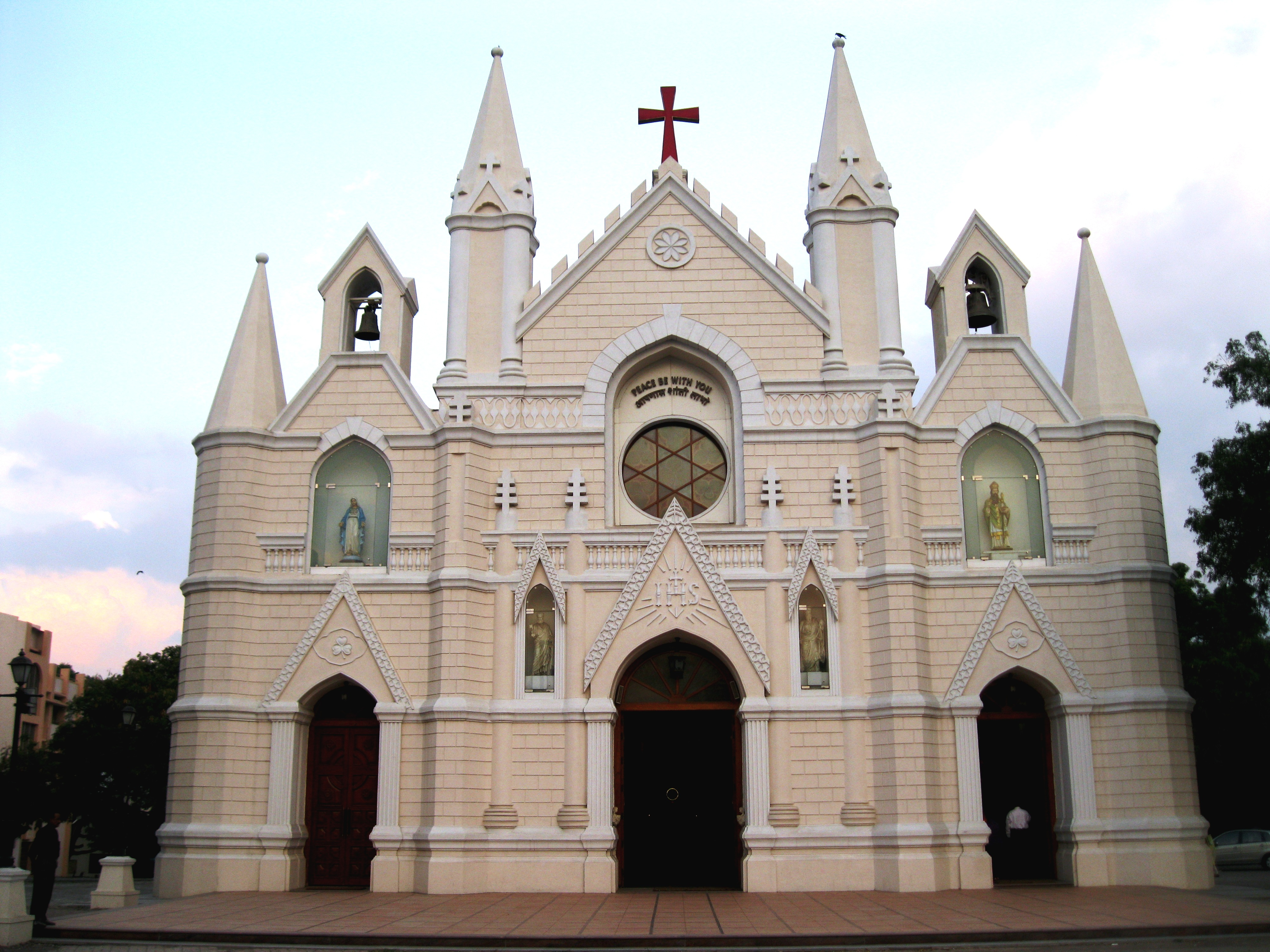
- St. Patrick's Cathedral, Poona

- Location within Maharashtra
- 18.5088°N 73.8982°E
- Country: India
- Denomination: Roman Catholic

History
- Status: Cathedral
- Dedication: Saint Patrick

Architecture
- Architect: Charles Correa

Administration
- Diocese: Roman Catholic Diocese of Poona

St. Patrick's Cathedral is a Roman Catholic religious building located adjacent to the 'Empress Garden' in Pune, India). Built in neo-gothic style in the middle of the 19th century, it was adopted as 'cathedral' church when Pune (then Poona) was made diocese (1886), of which it is still the main church. It also has the highest number of parishioners of the Pune diocese.

== History ==
The cathedral was built in 1850 mainly to cater the Irish Catholic soldiers and others settled in Wanwadi and nearby areas. Earlier, mass was celebrated for the troops, who were mainly Irish and other Catholics in a single-room chapel at the end of Right Flank Lines in Wanwadi. Bishop Anastasius Hartmann OFM Cap., the Apostolic Vicar of Bombay and Poona, wanted to have a better place of worship, and so he co-opted Fr. James Carry, an Irish diocesan priest from the Madras Mission, as a chaplain in Poona in 1849. Fr. Carry immediately drew up plans to erect a new chapel.

At the request of the bishop, the government allotted land. The chapel was built with contributions from people and from the soldiers, who contributed a month's salary. On 8 December 1850, the first mass was celebrated in the new chapel, which is now St. Patrick's Cathedral. Fr. Carry completed the south (Wanwadi) side of the church, with its pinnacled buttresses. The north side (Ghorpuri) was completed later by Fr. Esseiva, S.J.

The Diocese of Poona was created in 1886 and Jesuit missionary Bernard Beider Linden was appointed the first bishop. Thus, St. Patrick's Church became St. Patrick's Cathedral in 1887.

On 15 July 1984, the roof of the cathedral collapsed. With donations from benefactors, the cathedral was rebuilt by Bishop Valerian D' Souza, with a new curved vault roof designed by architect Charles Correa in place of the old pointed roof. The re-dedication of St. Patrick's Cathedral was held on 22 October 1987.

Eventually, the cathedral was again in need of repairs with the passage of time. Major renovation, repairs and redecoration of the cathedral was from 2009 to 2010, three of the highlights of which were a new backdrop to the sanctuary wall with a mosaic of the Risen Christ, 16 unique stained glass panels of the life of Jesus and a skylight above the altar depicting the Holy Spirit in stained glass.

== Architecture ==
The church is purely Gothic Architecture in style.
