= San Paolo della Croce a Corviale =

- Church of Saint Paul of the Cross in Corviale
- Chiesa di San Paolo della Croce
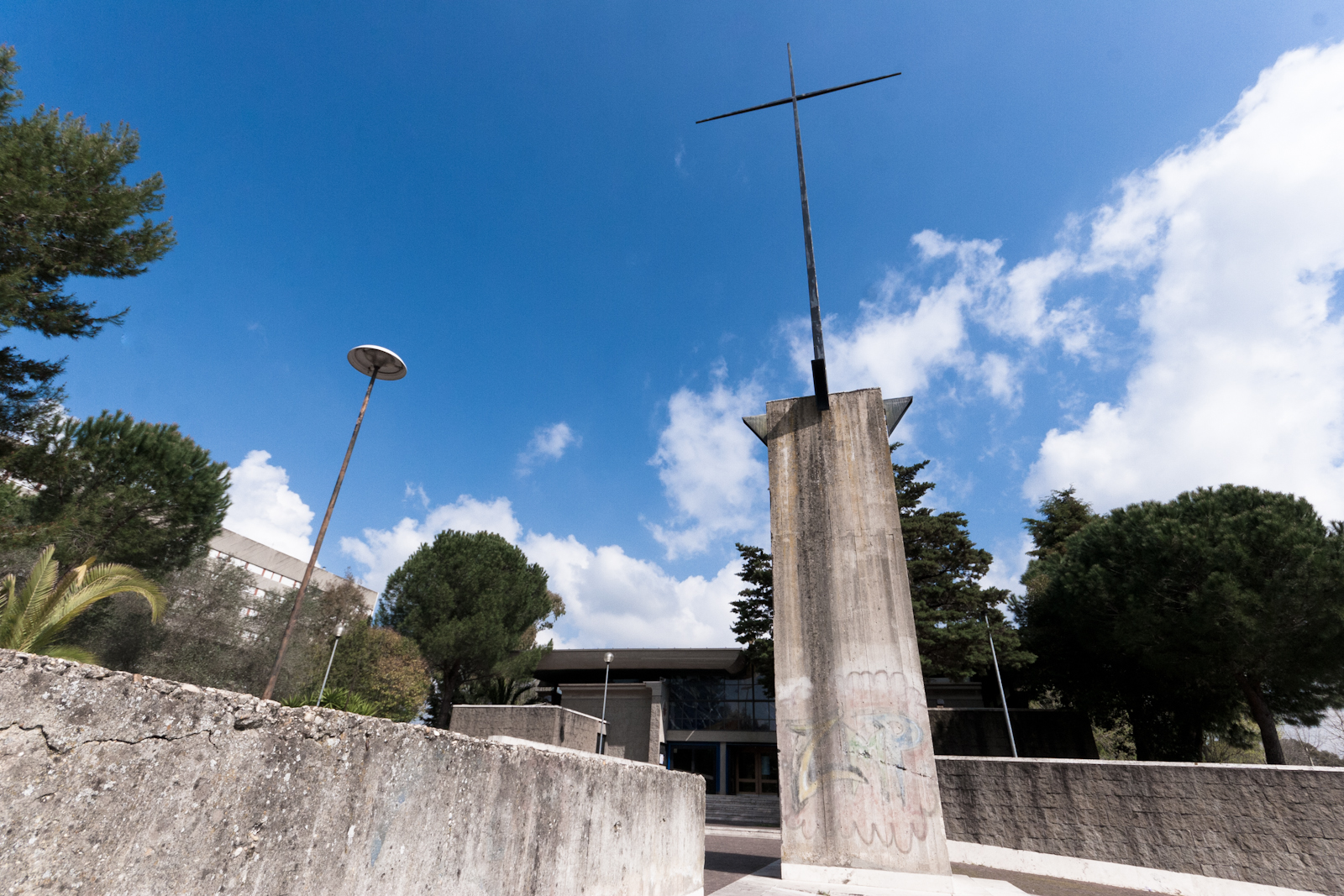
- Cross outside the church
- Click on the map for a fullscreen view
- 41°51′14″N 12°24′51″E
- Location: Via Poggio Verde 319, Rome
- Country: Italy
- Language: Italian
- Denomination: Catholic
- Tradition: Roman Rite
- Website: sanpaolodellacroce.org

History
- Status: titular church
- Dedication: Paul of the Cross
- Consecrated: 16 April 1983

Architecture
- Architect: Ennio Canino
- Architectural type: Modern
- Completed: 1983

Administration
- Diocese: Rome

San Paolo della Croce a Corviale is a 20th-century parochial church and cardinalatial titular church in the western suburbs of Rome, dedicated to Saint Paul of the Cross.

== History ==
The church was built in the early 1980s and was dedicated on 16 April 1983. Dedicated to Paul of the Cross whose feastday is celebrated there every year on October 17.

On 25 May 1985, it was made a titular church to be held by a cardinal-priest.

On 15 April 2018 the church was visited by Pope Francis.

Cardinal-Protectors

- Louis-Albert Vachon (1985–2006)
- Oswald Gracias (2007–present)
