= John Rodrigues =

Indian Catholic bishop (born 1967)

His Grace John Rodrigues
- Archbishop of Bombay
- Church: Roman Catholic Church
- Archdiocese: Archdiocese of Bombay
- See: Bombay
- Appointed: 30 November 2024
- Installed: 25 January 2025
- Predecessor: Oswald Gracias
- Other posts: Auxiliary Bishop of Bombay; Titular Bishop of Deultum
- Previous posts: Auxiliary Bishop of Bombay; Titular Bishop of Deultum; Bishop of Poona

Orders
- Ordination: 18 April 1998 by Ivan Dias
- Consecration: 15 May 2013 by Oswald Gracias
- Rank: Archbishop

Personal details
- Born: John Rodrigues; 21 August 1967 (age 59) Mumbai, India
- Denomination: Roman Catholic
- Residence: Archbishop's House, Mumbai, India
- Parents: Stanley Rodrigues (father); Corinne Rodrigues (mother)
- Education: St Pius X College Mumbai
- Motto: Building Up The Body of Christ

Ordination history of John Rodrigues
History
Priestly ordination
- Ordained by: Ivan Dias
Episcopal consecration
- Principal consecrator: Oswald Gracias
- Co-consecrators: Filipe Neri Ferrão; Agnelo Gracias
Episcopal succession
Bishops consecrated by John Rodrigues as principal consecrator

John Rodrigues (born 21 August 1967) is an Indian prelate of the Catholic Church who is the Archbishop of Bombay. He was coadjutor archbishop of the Archdiocese of Bombay from 30 November 2024 to 25 January 2025. He was Bishop of Poona from March 2023 to November 2024, and before that served as an auxiliary bishop of Bombay for ten years.

== Biography ==
John Rodrigues was born on 21 August 1967 in an east indian family in the Bandra suburb of Mumbai. He and his two older brothers became priests, one of them a Jesuit. Their father Late Stanley Rodrigues died in 1975 and they were raised by their widowed mother Corinne, who was a leader of the Marriage Encounter movement with her husband and founded a charity to support widows. John Rodrigues earned a bachelor of science degree in physics at Mumbai University and a bachelor's in philosophy and theology at St. Pius X College in Goregaon, a Mumbai suburb. One of his seminary teachers was Oswald Gracias, later Cardinal Archbishop of Bombay.

He was ordained a priest on 18 April 1998. Following ordination he served for a year as assistant priest at St. Michael's in Mahim and then for a year as assistant to the archbishop. He spent the next two years studying in Rome, earning a licentiate in systematic theology at the Pontifical Lateran University in 2002. Returning to Mumbai, he taught systematic theology at St Pius X College from 2002 to 2011, serving also as the school's group moderator from 2003 to 2013 and dean of studies from 2011 to 2013. He was named rector of the college, but served only a few weeks before being named a bishop. Alongside his academic work, he served the archdiocese as secretary of the priests council from 2010 to 2013 and as coordinator for the Year of Faith in 2012/13.

Pope Francis named him auxiliary bishop of Bombay on 15 May 2013. He received his episcopal consecration on 29 June 2013 from Cardinal Oswald Gracias, with co-consecrators Filipe Neri Ferrão, Archbishop of Goa e Daman, and Agnelo Rufino Gracias, Auxiliary Bishop of Bombay. He chose as his episcopal motto "Building Up The Body of Christ". At the end of his term as auxiliary he headed the deaneries for Bandra and Borivali and rector of the Basilica of Our Lady of the Mount in Bandra.

Pope Francis appointed him bishop of Poona on 25 March 2023. He was installed there on 24 May.

Pope Francis named him coadjutor archbishop of Bombay on 30 November 2024. He succeeded as archbishop when Pope Francis accepted the resignation of Cardinal Gracias on 25 January 2025.
