= Valerian D'Souza =

Indian Roman Catholic bishop (1933–2020)

The Right Reverend Valerian D’Souza Ph.Lic, B.Ed., B.Sc
- Bishop Emeritus of Poona
- Church: Roman Catholic Church
- Diocese: Roman Catholic Diocese of Poona
- See: Poona (emeritus)
- Installed: 4 April 2009
- Term ended: 25 February 2020
- Predecessor: William Zephyrine Gomes
- Other posts: Bishop of Poona.^{(1977-2009)} Vice-President of Conference of Catholic Bishops of India.^{(2002 – 2007)} Apostolic Administrator of Nashik.^{(2007-2008)}

Orders
- Ordination: 29 June 1961 by Joseph Schröffer
- Consecration: 25 September 1977 by Valerian Gracias
- Rank: Bishop

Personal details
- Born: Valerian D’Souza; 3 October 1933 Pune, Maharashtra.
- Died: 25 February 2020 (aged 86) Hadapsar, Pune, Maharashtra, India
- Buried: St Patrick's Cathedral, Poona; 18.5088°N 73.8982°E
- Denomination: Roman Catholic
- Residence: Pune, Maharashtra, India
- Education: (B. Sc.) in Physics, Chemistry and Mathematics. Bachelor of Education
- Alma mater: Papal Seminary, Pune . Sankt Georgen Graduate School of Philosophy and Theology.
- Motto: Inspired By The Word Of God.

Styles of Valerian D’Souza
- Reference style: The Right Reverend
- Spoken style: The Right Reverend
- Religious style: Bishop
- Informal style: Cardinal
- See: Poona (Emeritus)

Ordination history of Valerian D'Souza
History
Priestly ordination
- Ordained by: Joseph Schröffer
Episcopal consecration
- Principal consecrator: Valerian Cardinal Gracias
- Co-consecrators: Ignatius P. Lobo, Charles Gomes

Styles of Valerian D'Souza

Valerian D'Souza (3 October 1933 – 25 February 2020) was an Indian Roman Catholic bishop.

D'Souza was born in India and was ordained to the priesthood in 1961. He served as bishop of the Roman Catholic Diocese of Poona, India, from 1977 to 2009. He died on 25 February 2020.

== Biography ==
He was born in Pune on 3 October 1933. He completed his university degree course (B. Sc.) in Physics, Chemistry and Mathematics before commencing his studies for the priesthood. He obtained a licentiate in Philosophy at the Papal Seminary in Pune and studied theology at the Jesuit-run faculty Sankt George, Frankfurt, Germany. He was ordained a priest on 29 June 1961. He also obtained a Bachelor of Education degree and was Principal of Garrison High School (now St. Jude High School) Dehu Road, for 7 years.

In 1971 he was appointed Vicar General of the Diocese and in December 1976 Vicar Capitular. On 25 September 1977 he was ordained Bishop of Poona. He was: Chairman of the Commission for Seminaries, Clergy and Religious for 7 years; Chairman of the Commission for Youth of the CBCI Western Region; President of the CBCI Western Region for 4 years and Chairman of the CBCI Commission for Women for 4 years. In February 2002 he was elected as Vice President of the CCBI.

In September 2000, Pope St. John Paul II nominated him as a Member of the Pontifical Council COR UNUM, which promotes and coordinates Christian Charity and development efforts, for a period of five years. In May 2007 his term was extended to another five years. On 31 March 2007, he was appointed Apostolic Administrator of the Diocese of Nashik.

He was known as “Singing Bishop” who communicated God’s Word in song, himself playing the guitar. His sense of humour and joy in the Lord touched the hearts of people. On the occasion of his Episcopal Silver Jubilee in September 2002 two books containing his writings were released, entitled: “Love is the only Answer” and “Shepherd’s Voice”.

Bishop Valerian was Bishop of Poona from September 1977 till April 2008, and was appointed Diocesan Administrator of Poona till his successor Bishop Thomas Dabre was appointed in April 2009. Even after his retirement, he was actively involved in Pastoral Ministry in the Diocese of Poona till his death. He was a priest for 58 years and a Bishop for 42 years.
