= Roman Catholic Diocese of Poona =

Roman Catholic diocese in Maharashtra, India

Coordinates: 18.5088°N 73.8979°E

Diocese of Poona Diœcesis Poonensis
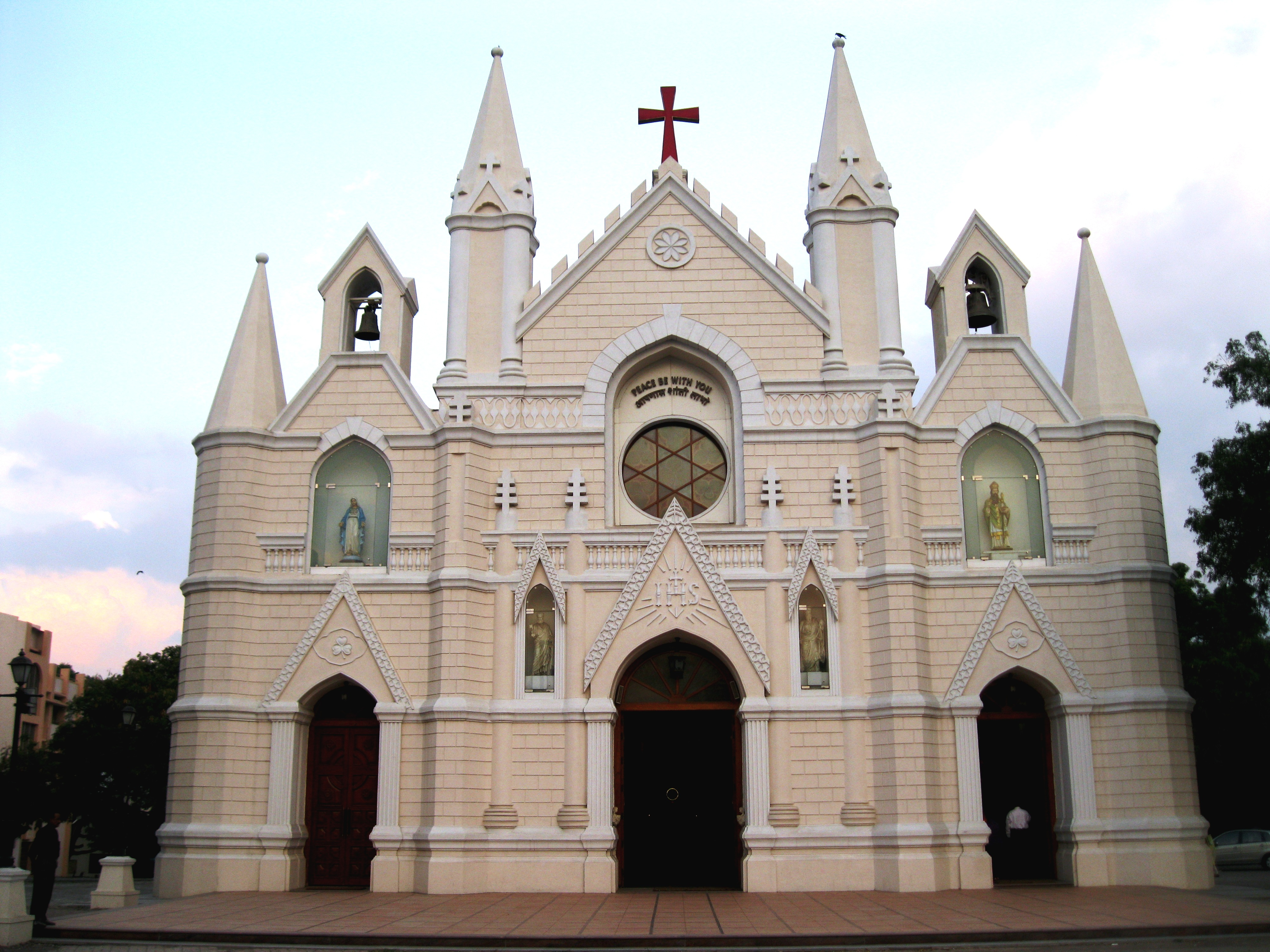
- St. Patrick's Cathedral, Pune

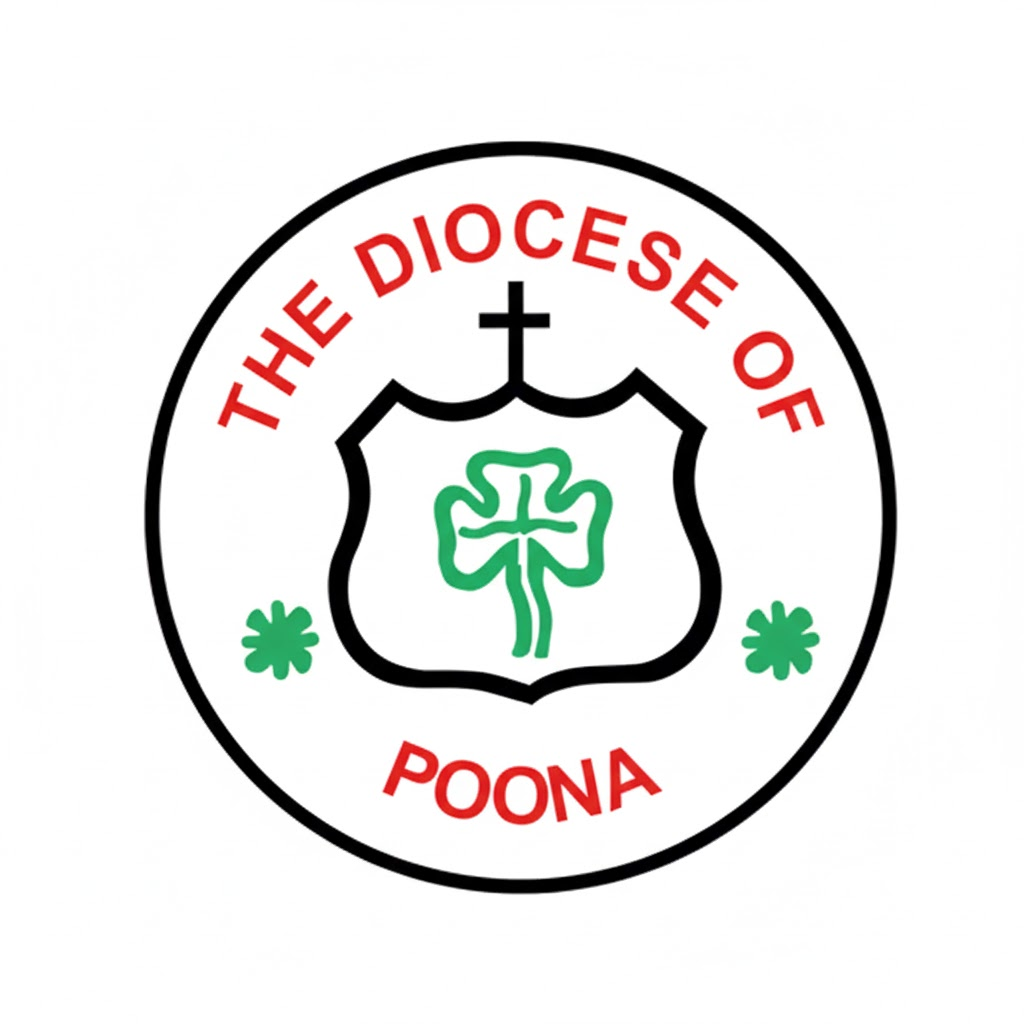
- Coat of arms

Location
- Country: India
- Metropolitan: Bombay

Statistics
- Area: 49,687 km^{2} (19,184 sq mi)
- Population: Total; Catholics: (as of 2005); 24,305,883; 64,234 (0.3%)

Information
- Denomination: Roman Catholic Church
- Rite: Latin Rite
- Cathedral: St. Patrick’s Cathedral

Current leadership
- Pope: Leo XIV
- Bishop: Simon Almeida
- Metropolitan Archbishop: John Rodrigues
- Bishops emeritus: Thomas Dabre

Website
- Website of the Diocese

The Roman Catholic Diocese of Poona is a diocese located in the city of Pune in the ecclesiastical province of Archdiocese of Mumbai in India.

The Poona Diocese consists of the civil districts of Pune, Satara, Solapur, Sangli & Kolhapur city. n 1850, St. Patrick's Church, the present cathedral, was built.

Poona became a Vicariate Apostolic by dismemberment from Bombay on March 8, 1854, and was turned over to the Jesuits. The Vicar Apostolic of Bombay remained Administrator till the Hierarchy was established in 1886. The Jesuit Bernard Bieder-Linden was appointed its first bishop.

On October 20, 1953, the Catholics of Ratnagiri District and those of the Church of the Immaculate Conception, Pune, who formerly belonged to the Archdiocese of Goa, were placed under the jurisdiction of the Bishop of Poona. On November 30, 1953, the districts of Dharwar and Bijapur, formerly in the Poona Diocese were attached to the newly constituted Diocese of Belgaum.

On June 9, 1987, the Diocese of Nashik was created, comprising four districts - Nashik, Dhule, Jalgaon and Ahmednagar - of the Poona Diocese. Jesuit Thomas Bhalerao became its first bishop. St.Patrick's Cathedral was rededicated on October 22, 1987. The roof of the old Cathedral collapsed shortly before midnight on July 15, 1984. The outer walls and facade have been retained, and there is a vaulted roof of concrete.

The Eparchy of Kalyan, which is contiguous with the Archdiocese of Bombay and the Dioceses of Poona and Nashik, was created on May 19, 1988. On August 24, 1988, Paul Chittilapilly was ordained Eparch of Kalyan, and the new diocese was formally inaugurated. All Catholics of the Syro-Malabar rite in the diocese came under his jurisdiction.

The First Diocesan Synod was held at Ishvani Kendra, Pune, from 11 to 14 February 2003. A total of 144 delegates from all the 7 districts attended.

== History ==
- 1854: Established as Apostolic Vicariate of Poona from the Apostolic Vicariate of Bombay
- September 1, 1886: Promoted as Diocese of Poona

== Roman Catholic Churches in Pune ==
- St Patrick's Cathedral

Catholics: 11,850

- St. John Paul II Church - Wakad (Wakad Mass Centre)

Catholics: 60 Families
C/o Prerna Bhavan, S. No. 93, Tathwade Village,
Near Indira College,
Wakad, Pune 411033.
Mobile: 99233 17352, 94232 17352
Clergy: Rev. Fr. Simon Almeida (Priest-in-charge)
Deacon Roy Dmonte'
Directions

- Church Of Our Lady Of Perpetual Help

Catholics: 1,220

- St. Anne's Church

Catholics: 1,220
Solapur Bazaar
Pune 411 001 Tel : 26362614

- St. Joseph's Church

Catholics: 3, 800

- Good Shepherd Church

Catholics: 3,030

- St. Xavier's Church

Catholics: 1,300

- Immaculate Conception Church (City Church)

Catholics: 3,214

- St. Teresa's Church

Catholics: 1,450

- St. Ignatius Church

Catholics: 6,964

- Sacred Heart Church

Catholics: 7,625

- Holy Cross Church

Catholics: 2,823

- St. Francis de Sales Church

Catholics: 4,200

- St. Anthony's Church
- Our Lady Consoler of the Afflicted Church
- St. Francis Xavier's Church

Catholics: 3,200

- Infant Jesus Church

Catholics: 1,220

- St. Sebastian's Church

Catholics: 940

- St. Jude Church

Catholics: 1,035

- St. Joseph's Church

Catholics: 1,000

- Divine Mercy Church
- Christ The King Church
- Our Lady of Mount Carmel Church
- St. Sebastian Chapel

NDA, Khadakvasla,
Pune 411 023 c/o 25675681

- Holy Family Chapel
- Resurrection Chapel
- Mother Teresa Centre
- God The Holy Spirit Chapel - Sinhagad road, vitthalwadi

== Bishops (Latin Rite) ==
=== Bishops of Poona ===
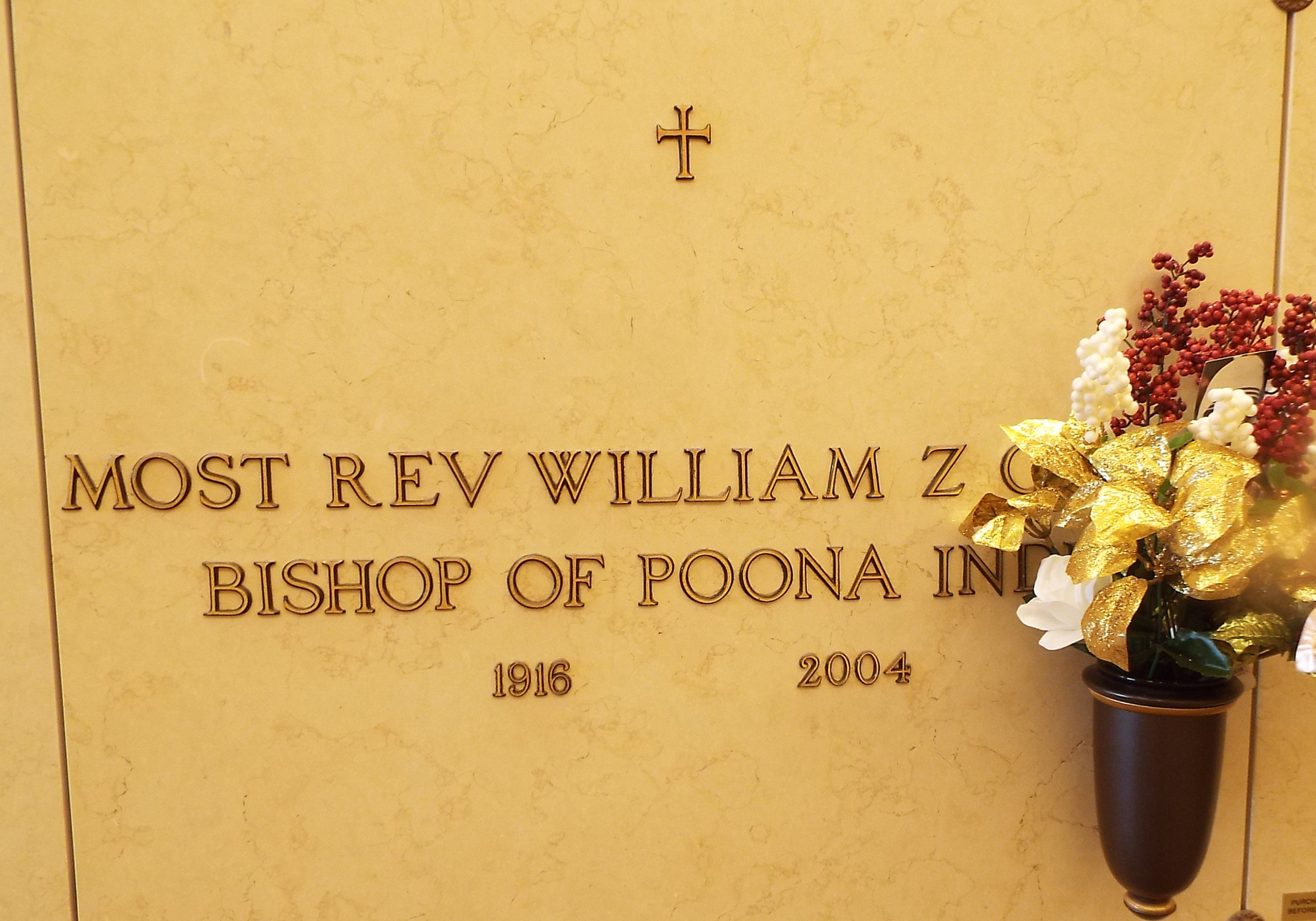
Crypt of William Zephyrine Gomes, located in the mausoleum of St. Francis Catholic Cemetery in Phoenix, Arizona

- Bernhard Beiderlinden, S.J. (20 Dec 1886 - 1907 )
- Heinrich Döring, S.J. (7 Sep 1907 - 16 Jun 1921), appointed titular archbishop; later returned here as Archbishop (personal title) (14 Jul 1927 - 15 Jan 1948)
- Andrew Alexis D'Souza (12 May 1949 - 12 Jun 1967 )
- William Zephyrine Gomes (12 Jun 1967 - 1 Dec 1976 )
- Valerian D'Souza (7 Jul 1977 - 2009)
- Thomas Dabre (4 Apr 2009 - 25 Mar 2023)
- John Rodrigues (25 Mar 2023 – 30 Nov 2024 ) Appointed coadjutor archbishop of Bombay
- Simon Almeida (01 Nov 2025–Present)

=== Other priests of this diocese who became bishops ===
- Fr. Malcolm as Bishop of Amravati on 30 November 2023.
- Lourdunada Daniel, appointed Bishop of Amravati in 2007
- Anthony Alwyn Fernandes Barreto, appointed Bishop of Sindhudurg in 2005
- Michael Rodrigues, appointed Bishop of Belgaum in 1953
