= Agnelo Gracias =

20th and 21st-century Catholic bishop

The Most Reverend Agnelo Rufino Gracias
- Apostolic Administrator of Jalandhar
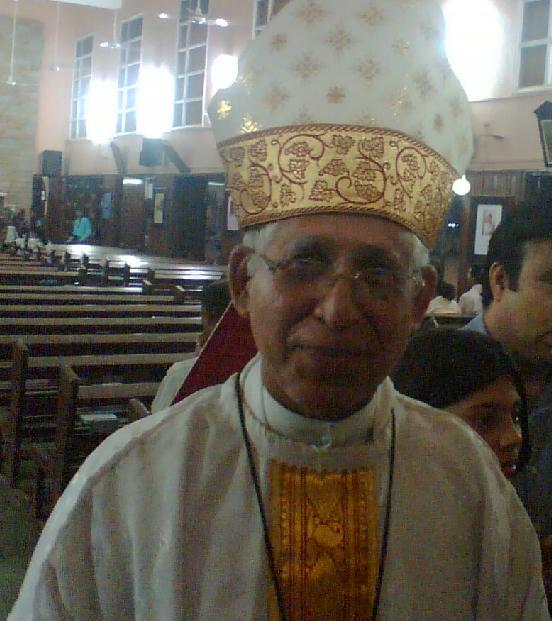
- Agnelo Rufino Gracias at Our Lady of Lourdes, Orlem, Malad
- Church: Roman Catholic
- Archdiocese: Archdiocese of Mumbai
- Province: Mumbai
- Metropolis: Mumbai
- Diocese: Archdiocese Of Mumbai
- See: Molicunza
- Elected: 20 September 2018

Orders
- Ordination: 21 December 1962
- Consecration: 21 April 2001 by Ivan Dias
- Rank: Bishop-Priest

Personal details
- Born: Agnelo Rufino Gracias; July 30, 1939 (age 86) Mombasa, British Kenya
- Denomination: Roman Catholic
- Residence: Panvel, Mumbai
- Parents: António Balduino Gracias, Adelia Maria Vitória Remegia Gracias
- Profession: Chairman, CBCI Family Commission; Archdiocesan Consulter; Pontifical Commissary to the Heralds of Good News; Chairman, CCBI Doctrinal Commission; Rector of St Pius X College, Goregaon(1985-1993); Titular bishop of Molicunza; Auxiliary Bishop of Bombay
- Education: Mechanical Engineering
- Alma mater: Sacred Heart School, Mombasa

Styles of Agnelo Rufino Gracias
- Reference style: Bishop
- Spoken style: Your Excellency
- Religious style: The Most Reverend

Agnelo Rufino Gracias (born 30 July 1939, in Mombasa) is the auxiliary bishop of the Roman Catholic Archdiocese of Bombay. On 8 October 2018, Gracias took office as apostolic administrator sede plena et ad nutum Sanctae Sedis of the diocese of Jalandhar.
