= Valerian Gracias =

Indian Cardinal of the Catholic Church

His Eminence Valerian Gracias PV
- Cardinal, Archbishop of Bombay
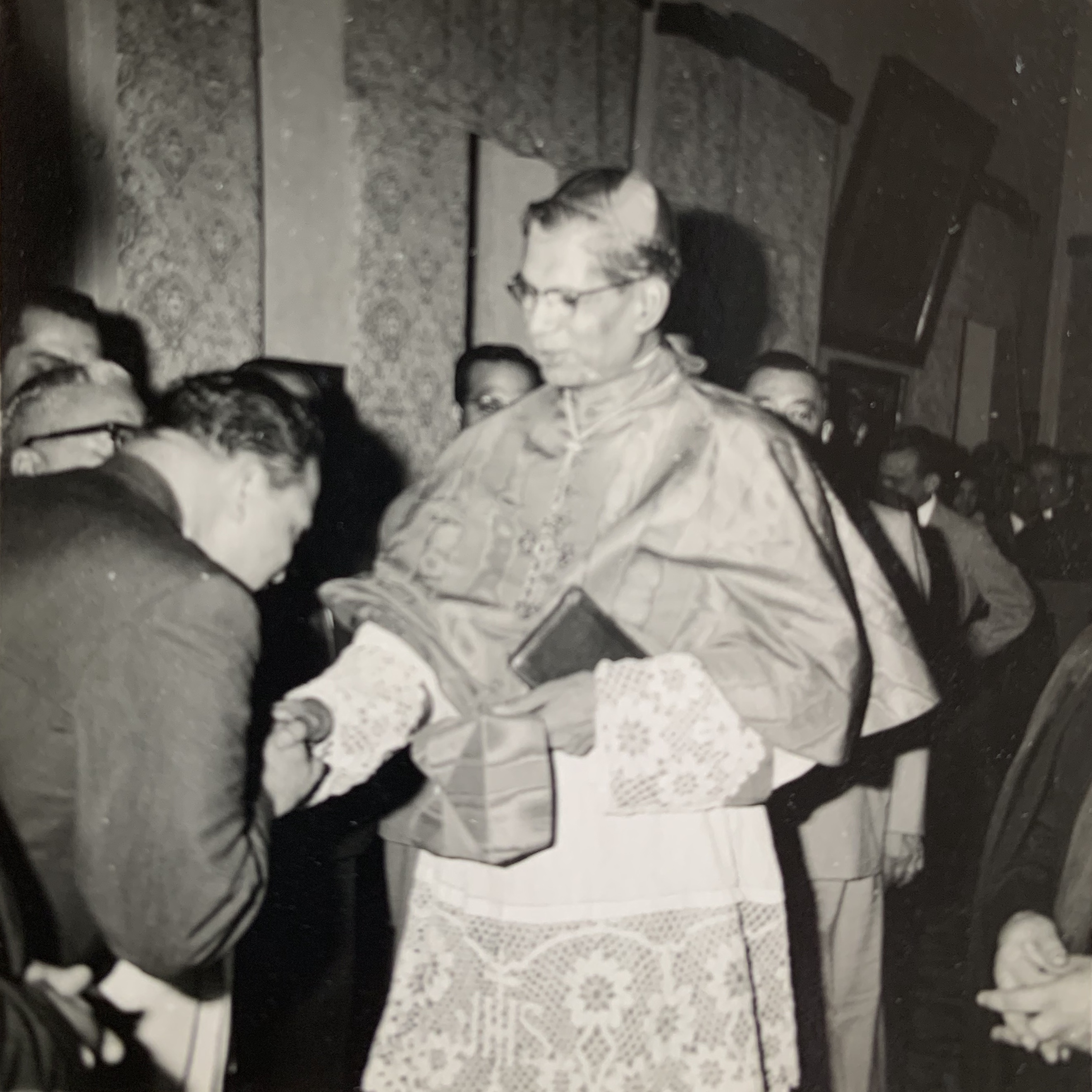
- Cardinal Gracias greeted by members of the Indian Maltese community at the La Valette Band Club in Malta in 1958
- Archdiocese: Archdiocese of Bombay
- Province: Bombay
- Metropolis: Bombay
- See: Bombay
- Installed: 4 December 1950
- Term ended: 11 September 1978
- Predecessor: Archbishop Thomas Roberts, S.J.
- Successor: Simon Pimenta
- Other posts: Cardinal-Priest of Santa Maria in Via Lata^{(1953-1978)} Auxiliary Bishop of Bombay^{(1946-1950)}. President of the Catholic Bishop's Conference of India.^{(1958 – 1972)} Titular Bishop of Thennesus.^{(1946-1950)}

Orders
- Ordination: 3 October 1926
- Consecration: 29 June 1946 by Archbishop Thomas Roberts, S.J.
- Created cardinal: 12 January 1953 by Pope Pius XII
- Rank: Cardinal-Priest

Personal details
- Born: Valerian Gracias; 23 October 1900 Karachi, British India
- Died: 11 September 1978 (aged 77) Bombay, Maharashtra, India
- Buried: Cathedral of the Holy Name, Mumbai; 18°55′24″N 72°49′50″E
- Denomination: Roman Catholic
- Residence: Bombay, India
- Education: St. Patrick's High School St. Joseph's Seminary (Mangalore); Pontifical Seminary (Kandy) Pontifical Gregorian University
- Motto: Fraternitatis Amore^{(Latin)} In the love of brotherhood^{(English)}

Ordination history of Valerian Gracias
History
Priestly ordination
- Date: 3 October 1926
Episcopal consecration
- Principal consecrator: Archbishop Thomas Roberts, S.J
- Co-consecrators: Bishop Vittore Rosario Fernandes, Bishop Thomas Pothacamury (Pothakamuri)
- Date: 29 June 1946
Cardinalate
- Elevated by: Pope Pius XII
- Date: 12 January 1953
Episcopal succession
Bishops consecrated by Valerian Gracias as principal consecrator
- Bishop Michael Rodrigues: 30 November 1953
- Bishop Longinus Gabriel Pereira: 11 August 1955
- Archbishop Dominic Romuald Basil Athaide, O.F.M. Cap: 20 May 1956
- Bishop John Burke: 1 November 1959
- Archbishop Angelo Innocent Fernandes: 1 November 1959
- Archbishop Hubert D’Rosario, S.D.B.: 6 September 1964
- Bishop Ignatius Salvador D’Souza: 30 November 1966
- Bishop Winnibald Joseph Menezes: 3 February 1968
- Bishop Patrick Paul D’Souza: 8 August 1970
- Bishop Joseph Robert Rodericks, S.J.: 9 January 1971
- Simon Ignatius Cardinal Pimenta: 29 June 1971
- Bishop Valerian D’Souza: 25 September 1977
- Bishop Dominic Joseph Abreo: 9 April 1978

Valerian Gracias (23 October 1900 – 11 September 1978) was an Indian Catholic prelate who served as Archbishop of Bombay from 1950 until his death. He was made a cardinal in 1953 by Pope Pius XII.

== Biography ==
Valerian Gracias was born in Karachi, British India (in modern Pakistan), to José (d. 1902) and Carlota Gracias. His parents were from Dramapur-Navelim, Goa, working in Karachi. He studied at St. Patrick's High School in Karachi, St. Joseph Seminary in Mangalore, and the Pontifical Seminary of Kandy in Ceylon, where he obtained his doctorate in theology. Ordained to the priesthood on 3 October 1926, Gracias then did pastoral work in Bandra until November 1927, when he entered the Pontifical Gregorian University in Rome. He finished his studies at the Gregorian in 1929 and became private secretary to Archbishop Joachim Lima SJ and diocesan chancellor of Bombay. He served as a preacher and pastor, and as the editor of various newspapers before being named the first Indian rector of Mumbai's Holy Name Cathedral in December 1941.

On 16 May 1946, he was appointed Auxiliary Bishop of Bombay and Titular bishop of Thennesus. Gracias received his episcopal consecration on the following 29 June from Archbishop Thomas Roberts SJ, with Bishops Victor Fernandes and Thomas Pothacamury as co-consecrators. Pope Pius XII promoted him to Archbishop of Bombay on 4 December 1950 to replace Roberts, a 57-year-old Englishman, who made way for the appointment of a native-born Indian. Gracias demonstrated his support of Goan nationalism and an opponent of Portuguese colonial rule by presenting an image of the Virgin Mary as an indigenous Indian, at a time when the populace was still accustomed to European representations.

On 29 November 1952 Pope Pius XII announced he would create 24 new cardinals, increasing the size of the College of Cardinals to 70 members, its maximum at the time. When one of them died on 28 December, the Vatican announced on 29 December that Gracias would be made a cardinal, the first from India. He was made Cardinal-Priest of S. Maria in Via Lata in the consistory of 12 January 1953. Gracias was considered to be a conservative. The Portuguese government denied reports that it was displeased with the honor bestowed upon Gracias.

He was one of the 51 cardinal electors in the 1958 papal conclave and one of the 80 in the conclave of 1963. He attended the Second Vatican Council (1962–1965), where he was one of 21 Council participants to present the closing messages of the Council on 8 December 1965. He hosted the first papal visit to India in 1964, when Pope Paul VI attended the International Eucharistic Congress in Bombay, preceded by a symposium of Catholic theologians to which he invited Hans Küng. He later said that Pope Paul VI's Bombay visit inspired his encyclical Populorum progressio (1967). In 1970 he was one of 15 prelates chosen to organize the 1971 Synod of Bishops, and he supported Pope Paul against critics of his approach to church governance and insistence of priestly celibacy. From 1954 to 1972, he was President of the Catholic Bishops' Conference of India and in 1972 helped overcome Vatican skepticism and win Pope Paul's approval of the formation of the Federation of Asian Bishops' Conferences.

He fell ill in May 1978 and did not participate in the conclave of August 1978. Gracias died from cancer in Bombay 11 September 1978 at age 77. He was buried in Holy Name Cathedral in Mumbai.

He was awarded the Padma Vibhushan award, second-highest civilian award of the Republic of India, on 26 January 1966.

Catholic Church titles
Preceded by Thomas Roberts SJ	Archbishop of Bombay; 1950–1978	Succeeded by Simon Pimenta
