= Roman Catholic Archdiocese of Bombay =

Catholic archdiocese in Maharashtra, India

Archdiocese of Bombay Archidioecesis Bombayensis
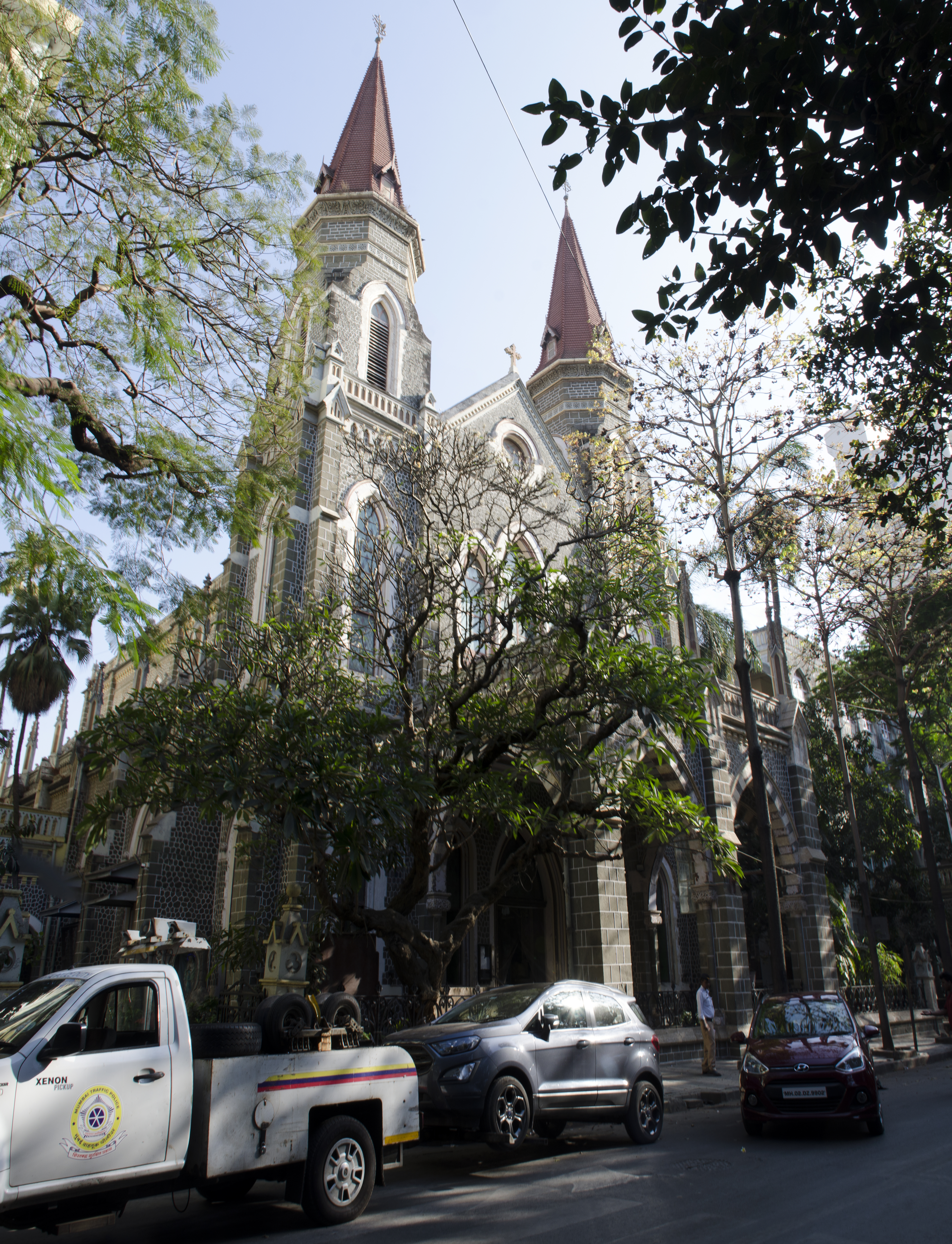
- Cathedral of the Holy Name, Mumbai

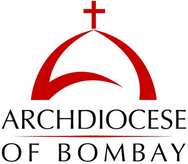
- Coat of arms

Location
- Country: India
- Territory: Maharashtra
- Ecclesiastical province: Bombay
- Metropolitan: Bombay
- Coordinates: 18.923457°N 72.830646°E

Statistics
- Area: 10,103 km^{2} (3,901 sq mi)
- Population: Total; Catholics: (as of 2022); 21,908,027; 483,534 (2.2%)
- Parishes: 124

Information
- Denomination: Catholic Church
- Sui iuris church: Latin Church
- Rite: Roman Rite
- Established: 1 September 1886
- Cathedral: Cathedral of the Holy Name, Mumbai
- Patron saint: Saint Gonsalo Garcia; Saint Francis Xavier

Current leadership
- Pope: Leo XIV
- Archbishop: John Rodrigues
- Auxiliary Bishops: Dominic Savio Fernandes
- Vicar General: Most Rev. Dominic Savio Fernandes
- Episcopal Vicars: Fr Caesar D'mello, Fr. Felix D’Souza, Fr Barthol S. Machado, Fr Harold Vaz,
- Judicial Vicar: Fr. K.T. Emmanuel
- Bishops emeritus: Percival Joseph Fernandez; Bosco Penha; Agnelo Rufino Gracias; Oswald Gracias

Website
- archdioceseofbombay.org

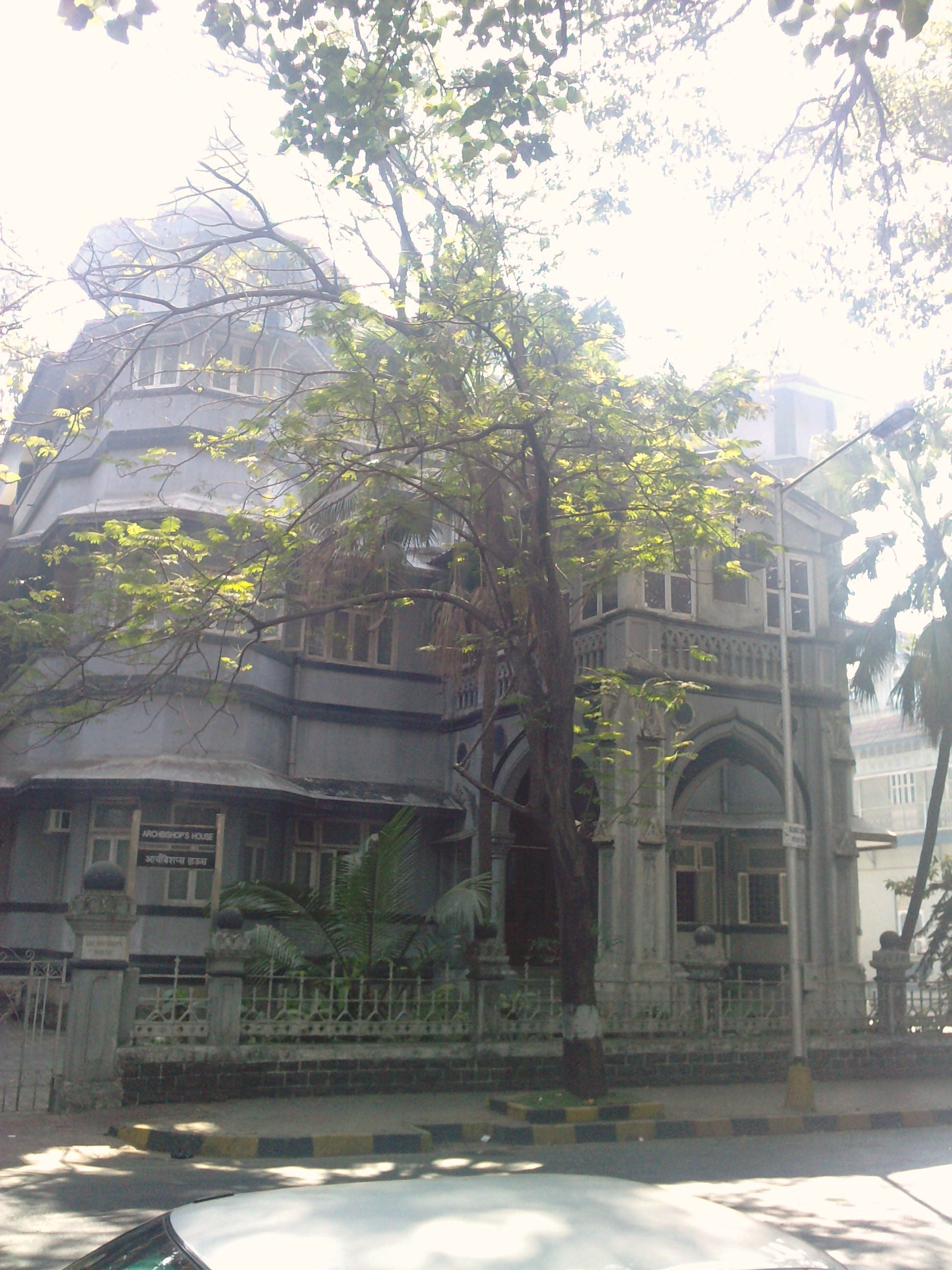
Building that houses the Archbishop of Bombay next to the Holy Name Cathedral

The Archdiocese of Bombay is a Latin Church archdiocese of the Catholic Church. Its episcopal see is in Bombay (Mumbai) and encompasses the northern Konkan division of Maharashtra, India. The cathedral is the Cathedral of the Holy Name. It also administers an important minor basilica, the Basilica of Our Lady of the Mount, in Bandra suburb of Bombay.

As of 2006, the archdiocese had 277 diocesan priests, 283 religious priests, 383 male religious brothers and 1,530 religious sisters. The archdiocese serves a total of 506,976 Indian Catholics in 121 parishes all across the Greater Bombay Metropolitan Area.

Archbishop John Rodrigues succeeded Oswald Cardinal Gracias as the Archbishop of Bombay on 25 January 2025, following Pope Francis's acceptance of Cardinal Gracias' resignation.

== History ==
The Portuguese first reached the west coast of India when Vasco da Gama landed at Calicut in 1498. They finally established themselves at Velha Goa in 1510. In 1526 they established a factory in Bassein. In 1534, the islands of Bassein, Salsette, Bombay and Karanja were ceded to the Portuguese by Bahadur Shah of Gujarat. In this very year, the Primate of the East Indies seated at Goa, was created and the whole of the northern Konkan region what was then Portuguese Bombay and Bassein, today better known as Greater Bombay Metropolitan Area formed part of that archdiocese. Missionary activities in Bassein (Burma), Salsette and Bombay commenced from 1534 onwards, thus laying the foundation for the future Archdiocese of Bombay. The Portuguese missionaries who accompanied the conquerors were the Franciscans, Jesuits, Dominicans and Augustinians.

In 1637, the Holy See established the Apostolic Vicariate of Idalcan, also called Bijapur or Deccan, on vast territory split off from the Metropolitan Roman Catholic Archdiocese of Goa.

In 1665, the Bombay Island was ceded to the British as a part of the marriage dowry to Charles II of England by Catherine of Braganza of Portugal. In 1669 the pre-diocesan jurisdiction was renamed as Apostolic Vicariate of Great Mogul, exceptionally after the imperial Muslim prince above the princely states of Hind(ustan). The year 1692 marked an end to the Jesuit presence in Bombay.

The Decree expelling the Portuguese Franciscans from Bombay was issued by the British on 24 May 1720. On 17 May 1784 it lost huge territory to establish the Mission sui juris of Hindustan, nucleus of the Archbishopric of Agra.

Later, the British allowed the Italian Carmelites to take charge of the Catholic community in Bombay. In 1794 the double jurisdiction was devised by the British, which let them interfere in the religious life of the Catholics. In 1820 it was renamed after its see to Apostolic Vicariate of Bombay.

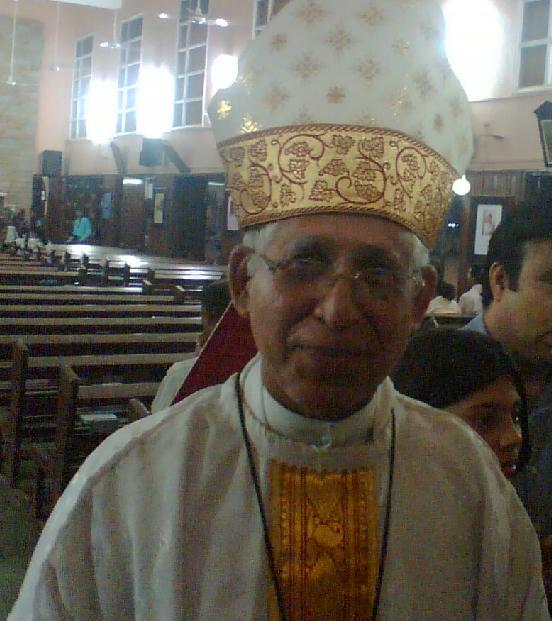
Agnelo Rufino Gracias, the Auxiliary Bishop of the Archdiocese of Bombay

On 12 December 1853 the Carmelites asked to be relieved of the administration of the Bombay Mission. The Holy See accepted their resignation and thus ended, after a period of 133 years (1720–1853), the Carmelite administration of the Vicariate of Bombay. On 16 February 1854 the Propaganda Fide officially divided the Bombay Vicariate into the northern Vicariate of Bombay, entrusted the Bombay Vicariate to the Capuchin Fathers (comprising the islands of Bombay, Colaba, Aurangabad, Khandesh, Malwa, Gujarat and Sindh as far as Kabul and Punjab) and the newly established southern Apostolic Vicariate of Poona (comprising the islands of Salsette and Bassein, and the regions of the Konkan and Deccan or Bijapur), entrusted to the Jesuit Fathers.

Finally, the Metropolitan Archdiocese of Bombay was established by Pope Leo XIII on 1 September 1886. The archdiocese received territorial jurisdiction over Bombay Island and over the northern districts of the Vicariate of Bombay with Poona as a suffragan diocese. Mangalore and Trichinopoly were added as suffragan sees in 1893, in which year the First Provincial Council was held (Acta et Decreta, Bombay, 1898).

It lost further territory repeatedly: on 20 May 1948 to establish the Diocese of Karachi (in Pakistan), on 5 May 1949 to establish the Diocese of Ahmedabad, on 29 September 1966 to establish the Diocese of Baroda, in April 1988 to establish the Diocese of Kalyan and on 22 May 1998 to establish the Diocese of Vasai (its suffragan).

It enjoyed papal visits from Pope Paul VI in December 1964 and Pope John Paul II in February 1986.

== Province ==
The ecclesiastical province of Bombay includes the Metropolitan's own Archdiocese, Mumbai, and the following suffragan bishoprics :

- Roman Catholic Diocese of Nashik
- Roman Catholic Diocese of Poona
- Roman Catholic Diocese of Vasai.

== Ordinaries ==
=== Apostolic Vicar of Idalcan ===
- Matthieu de Castro Malo, CO (1637-1668)

=== Apostolic Vicars of Great Mogul ===
- Custodio do Pinho (1669-1694), appointed Apostolic Vicar of Malabar
- Fernand Palma d'Artois, OCD (1696-1701)
- Pietro d’Alcántara di Santa Teresa Leonardi, OCD (1704-1707)
- Maurice di Santa Teresa Baistrocchi, OCD(1708-1726)
- Pietro d’Alcántara della Santissima Trinità Gagna di Cherasco, OCD (1728-1744)
- Innocent of the Presentation of Mary Strattmann, OCD(1746-1753)
- John Dominic of St. Clara Chiavassa, OCD (1756-1772)
- Charles of St. Conrad Vareschi, OCD (1773-1785)
- Angelin vom heiligen Joseph Geiselmayer, OCD (1785-1786)
- Viktor von der heiligen Maria Schwaiger, OCD (1787-1793)
- Pietro d’Alcántara di San Antonio Ramazzini, OCD (1794-1820)

=== Apostolic Vicars of Bombay ===
Sl.No	Ordinary	Designation	Year of appointment	Last year of service
1	Pietro d’Alcántara di San Antonio Ramazzini, OCD	Apostolic Vicar	1820	1840
2	Aloysius Mary of St. Teresa Fortini, OCD	Coadjutor Apostolic Vicar	1837	1840
3	Aloysius Mary of St. Teresa Fortini, OCD	Apostolic Vicar	1840	1848
4	John Francis William Whelan, OCD	Coadjutor Apostolic vicar	1842	1848
5	John Francis William Whelan, OCD	Apostolic vicar	1848	1850
6	Anastasius Hartmann, OFMCap	Apostolic Vicar	1854	1858
7	Waltar Steins Bisschop, SJ	Apostolic Vicar	1860	1867
8	Johann Gabriel Léon Louis Meurin, SJ	Apostolic Vicar	1867	1886

=== Archbishops of Bombay ===
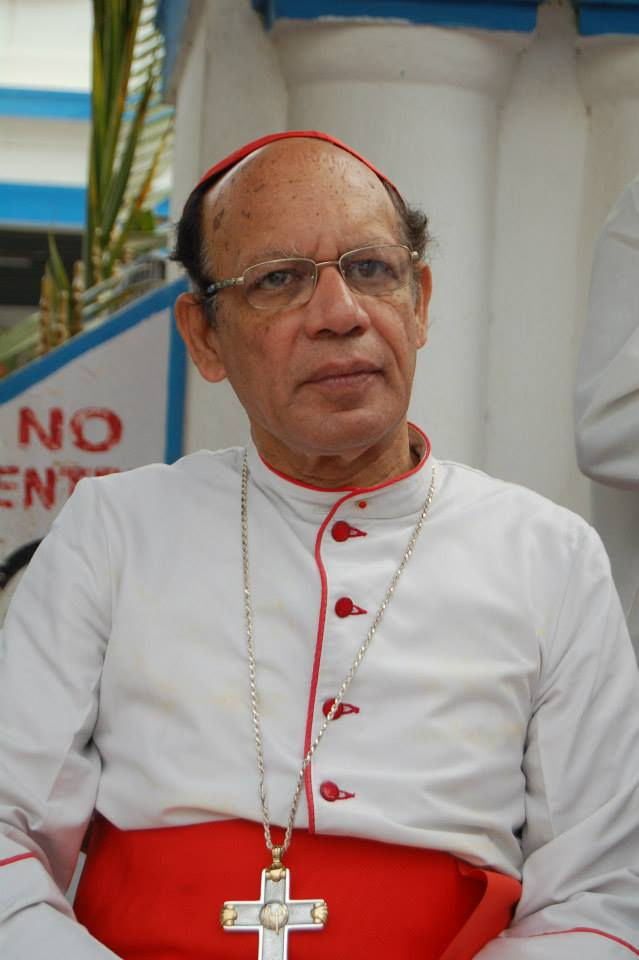
Oswald Gracias, the former Archbishop of Bombay

Sl.No	Ordinary	Designation	Year of appointment	Last year of service
1	George Porter SJ	Archbishop	1886	1889
2	Theodore Dalhoff SJ	Archbishop	1891	1906
3	Hermann Jurgens SJ	Archbishop	1907	1916
4	Alban Goodier SJ	Archbishop	1919	1926
5	Joachim Lima SJ	Archbishop	1928	1936
6	Thomas Roberts, SJ	Archbishop	1937	1950
7	Valerian Cardinal Gracias	Archbishop	1950	1978
8	Simon Cardinal Pimenta	Archbishop	1978	1996
9	Ivan Cardinal Dias	Archbishop	1996	2006
10	Oswald Cardinal Gracias	Archbishop	2006	2025
11	John Rodrigues	Archbishop	2025	present

== Media ==
The Examiner (formerly called the Bombay Catholic Examiner), is a diocesan news weekly published at the Examiner Press of the Archdiocese of Bombay. It was established on 10 July 1849 by a Jesuit father. Tej-Prasarini is a media and communication institution run by the Salesians of Don Bosco of the Archdiocese of Bombay. It combines a multimedia production centre with training programmes in creativity, media and peace education. It is a member of SIGNIS, the World Catholic Association for Communication. The archdiocese officially opened its own Catholic Communication Centre on 5 November 2011.

== Archdiocesan Board of Education ==
The Archdiocesan Board of Education, registered in 1985 as an Association under the Societies Registration Act –XXI / 1860, is a certified body for Catholic Institutions in Maharashtra and the Districts of Thane and Raigad. Functioning as a Federation of Schools for its first 20 years, the Consultation of Catholic Schools held in November 2004 reviewed the role of the ABE and recommended that it be an umbrella body for all Catholic Institutions, and that its role be extended to meet all the needs of Catholic Education.

The Board carries out tasks like co-ordination, research and documentation, planning and liaising with the State Department of Education and other Diocesan Bodies for its vast network of Educational Institutes, and offers services in legal and administrative problems. It also publishes a bulletin called 'Shikshan Vichar'.

== Controversy ==
In April 2012, at several police stations around the city complaints were filed by Catholic social activists against the atheist activist Sanal Edamaruku under section 295 of the Indian Penal Code, which states that persons can be arrested and charged on the allegations of hurting the religious sentiments of a particular community. Edamaruku had previously made derogatory statements regarding the pope, the Catholic Church, and priests, besides claiming to have exposed the "miracle" of the dripping Jesus in Mumbai. He confronted Church leaders on a live TV channel a month earlier, and also suggested that he would be arrested any moment. In early July 2012, this was borne out when police arrived at his house with the intent to arrest him.

In a statement, the Auxiliary Bishop of Bombay said: "The Church is always cautious in attributing supernatural causes to out-of-the-ordinary phenomena. Whenever possible, it always tries to find 'scientific' explanations for similar events. It does not pay great attention to things like this, although it accepts the possibility that God can intervene in human life in 'extraordinary' ways: what we call 'miracles'."

== Saints and causes for canonisation ==
- St. Bartholomew the Apostle
- The Four Martyrs of Thane
  - St. Thomas of Tolentino
  - Bl. James of Padua
  - Bl. Peter of Siena
  - Demetrius of Tiflis
- Bl. Odoric of Pordenone disinterred the relics of the Four Martyrs of Thane and carried them with him to China and Italy.
- Ven. Anastasius Hartmann, Apostolic Vicar of Bombay
- Ven. Fernanda Riva
- Servant of God Msgr. George Fernandes

== See also ==
List of parishes of the Roman Catholic Archdiocese of Bombay

== Sources and external links ==
- Official site of the Archdiocese of Bombay
- Archdiocese of Bombay on Catholic Hierarchy
- Archdiocese of Bombay on Catholic Encyclopedia, with incumbent biography links
- Archdiocese of Bombay on GCatholic.org
