= St. Mary's Cathedral, Jammu =

Church in Jammu, India

- St. Mary's Cathedral
- Garrison Church
- سینٹ میری کا کیتھیڈرل
- St. Mary's Cathedral, Jammu
- Location: Jammu Cantonment, Jammu and Kashmir, India
- Country: India
- Denomination: Roman Catholic

History
- Founded: 25 November 1989; 36 years ago
- Founder: Hippolytus Anthony Kunnunkal
- Dedication: Nativity of the Blessed Virgin Mary

Architecture
- Functional status: Active

Administration
- Archdiocese: Roman Catholic Archdiocese of Delhi
- Diocese: Roman Catholic Diocese of Jammu–Srinagar
- Parish: St. Mary's Parish

Clergy
- Archbishop: Anil Joseph Thomas Couto
- Bishop: Ivan Pereira
- Vicar: Fr. Jose Vadakkel

The St. Mary's Cathedral, also called Garrison Church, is a Roman Catholic cathedral church located in Jammu, Jammu and Kashmir, India. The cathedral is the mother church of the Diocese of Jammu-Srinagar.

It was founded in 1986 by Bishop Hippolytus Anthony Kunnunkal, following with the diocese's elevation by Pope John Paul II's apostolic constitution Qui Sanctissimi Numinis.

== History ==
Pope John Paul II 1986 apostolic constitution, Qui Sanctissimi Numinis, established the Diocese of Jammu-Srinigar from the Apostolic Prefecture of Kafiristan and Kashmir in response to the church's noticeable expansion and growth in the region. The seat of this new diocese was transferred to St. Mary's Cathedral from the seat of the Prefecture, Holy Family Catholic Church, in the same year under the guidance of the first diocese's first bishop, Hippolytus.

The cathedral parish also includes three sites beyond St. Mary's Cathedral: St. Thomas Church, St. Joseph's Church, and St. John Mary Vianney.

== See also ==
- Roman Catholicism in India
- List of cathedrals in India
