= Franco Mulakkal =

Indian bishop of the Catholic Church (born 1964)

- Bishop Emeritus of Jalandhar
- Archdiocese: Delhi
- Diocese: Jalandhar
- Appointed: 13 June 2013
- Installed: 4 August 2013
- Term ended: 1 June 2023
- Predecessor: Anil Joseph Thomas Couto

Orders
- Ordination: 21 April 1990
- Consecration: 21 February 2009 by Vincent Michael Concessao

Personal details
- Born: Franco Mulakkal; 25 March 1964 (age 62) Mattam, Kerala, India
- Denomination: Catholic Church
- Occupation: Bishop
- Education: Guru Nanak Dev University (M.A.); Alphonsian Academy (D.Phil.)

Franco Mulakkal is an Indian prelate of the Catholic Church. He was a member of the Syro-Malabar Catholic Church, until changing his sui iuris to the Latin church in lieu of mission work. He worked as the bishop of the Roman Catholic Diocese of Jalandhar from 2013 until his arrest in 2018 on charges of raping a nun. He is the first bishop in Indian Catholic church to be arrested for being accused in a rape case. In January 2022 the Kerala district court declared him innocent without the witnesses changing their statements. The court heard the statements of 39 witnesses in the case and he was acquitted of all charges. But the nuns are still fighting for their cause. He was forced to resign as Jalandhar bishop by the Vatican, and in June 2023 Pope accepted his resignation.

== Biography ==
Franco Mulakkal was born in Mattam, Thrissur, Kerala, India on 25 March 1964.

He was ordained for Priesthood at St.Thomas Forane Syro-Malabar Catholic Church, Mattom, Thrissur, Kerala on 21 April 1990.

Franco transferred church sui iuris from the Syro-Malabar Church to the Latin Church with his missionary work in northern India. He was appointed auxiliary bishop of the Latin Catholic Archdiocese of Delhi and titular bishop of Chullu on 17 January 2009. He was consecrated a bishop on 21 February 2009. He was appointed bishop of the Latin Catholic Diocese of Jalandhar on 13 June 2013 by Pope Francis. He was installed there on 4 August 2013. He also served as the Secretary of the Regional Bishops Conference of North India and Consultor for the Pontifical Council for Interreligious Dialogue.

== Sexual assault allegation and acquittal ==
In June 2018, a nun accused the bishop of rape, and a complaint was filed with the Kerala Police under Section 164 of Code of Criminal Procedure (CrPC, India). The nun alleged that she was raped by Mulakkal thirteen times between 2014 and 2016 during his visits to St. Francis Mission Home, Kuravilangad. Mulakkal said that rape story was fabricated in retaliation for taking action against the nun with regard to a complaint raised by a woman in 2016 alleging that the nun was having an illicit relationship with her husband, and the nun was removed from her post as Mother Superior after an inquiry. Police said that it was the bishop who first filed a complaint against the nun and the nun filed her complaint a day later. In his complaint, Mulakkal said that a nun was blackmailing him after he took disciplinary action against her, including transferring her, and that her family members are threatening to entrap him in rape case. FIR was filed for both cases. On 20 September 2018, Pope Francis accepted Mulakkal's request for a leave of absence. On 21 September 2018, the Kerala police arrested him. A Kerala judicial magistrate extended his judicial custody in jail for 14 days until 20 October 2018. The Kerala High Court rejected the bishop's first application for bail, citing prima facie evidence in the case. He was granted bail on 15 October 2018. In April 2019, he was formally charged by the Kerala police. The trial began in November 2019.

On 14 January 2022, the Additional Sessions Court acquitted him of all charges. The judge stated as the basis for acquittal that the nun's evidence contained "exaggerations and embellishments" and that "[w]hen it is not feasible to separate truth from falsehood, when grain and chaff are inextricably mixed up, the only available course is to discard the evidence in toto." The court also observed that there was no consistency in the complainant's statement and pointed out that her original version to the doctor is contradictory to the case. There have been widespread objections to the verdict, including letters published on social media in support of the complainant and five other nuns who supported her. Meanwhile, the nun and the prosecution are moving to file an appeal in the high court against the verdict.

== See also ==
- Catholic Church sexual abuse cases
- Catholic Church sexual abuse cases by country#India
- Catholic Church sexual abuse cases by country
