= Holy Family Catholic Church (Srinagar) =

Coordinates: 34.07455°N 74.818997°E

- ہولی فیملی کیتھولک چرچ
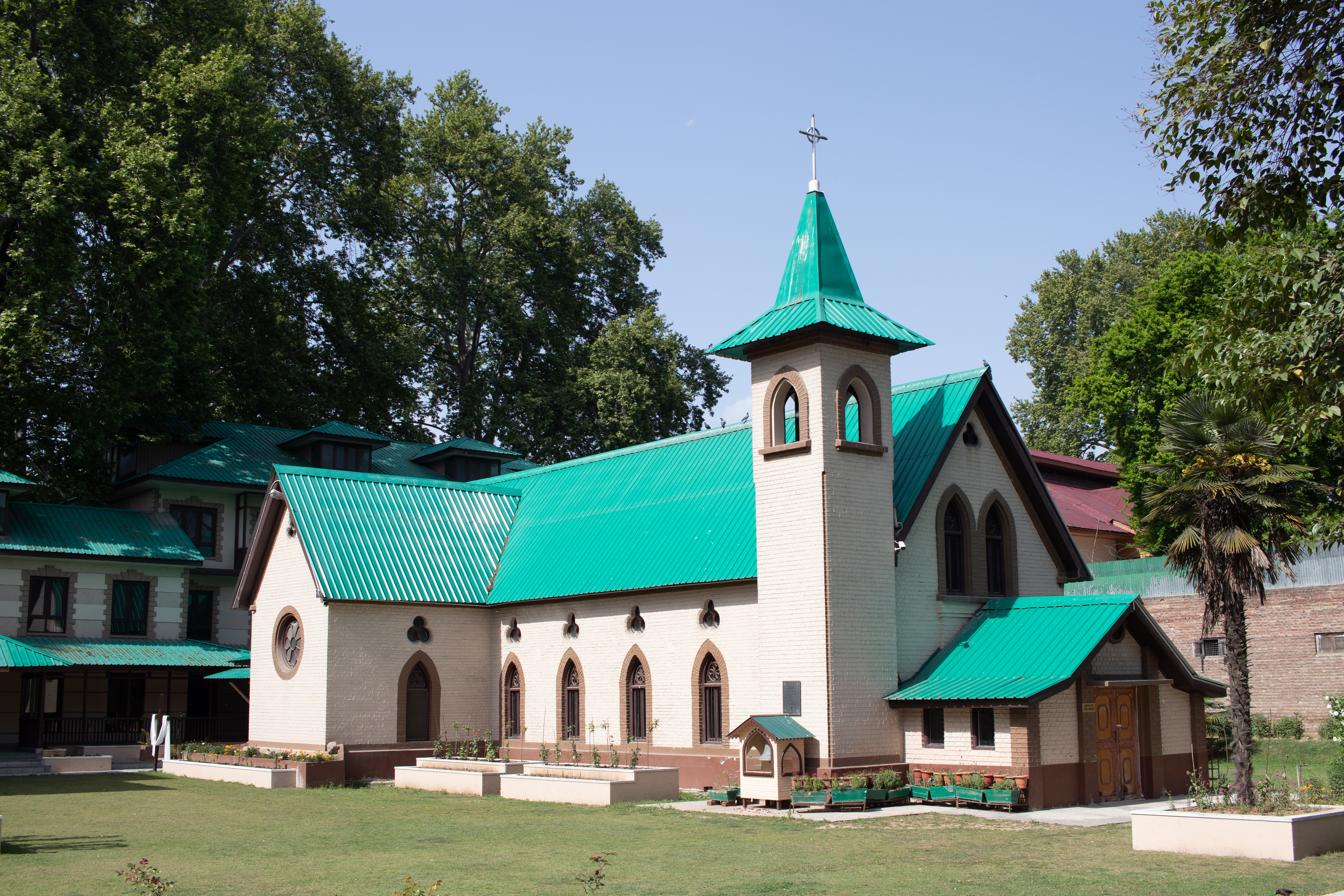
- Holy Family Catholic Church
- Location: Srinagar
- Country: India
- Denomination: Roman Catholic

History
- Status: Parish Church
- Founded: 1896; 130 years ago
- Founder: Msgr. Winkley MHM
- Dedication: Holy Family

Architecture
- Functional status: Active

Specifications
- Capacity: 200

Administration
- Archdiocese: Roman Catholic Archdiocese of Delhi
- Diocese: Roman Catholic Diocese of Jammu–Srinagar
- Deanery: Holy Family Catholic Church
- Parish: Holy Family Catholic Church

Clergy
- Archbishop: Anil Joseph Thomas Couto
- Bishop: Ivan Pereira
- Priest: Fr. John Paul

Roman Catholic Church

Holy Family Catholic Church is a Roman Catholic church located at Maulana Azad Road, Srinagar, Jammu and Kashmir, India. It was established in 1896 by Msgr. Winkley MHM. Before the Curia moved to Jammu on 23 December 1986, the parish served as a cathedral when the Curia was in Srinagar. Holy Family Catholic Church, All Saints Church (Protestant) and St. Luke's Church (Protestant) are the three main churches for the minority Christian community in the city.

== Arson and reconstruction ==
The church was set on fire on 7 June 1967 by protestors demonstrating against the Arab-Israeli war. During the arson, the belfry was destroyed. The church was rebuilt, and in 2017 a new church bell, which was donated by an Indian Christian family and made in the Indian city of Moradabad, was installed at Holy Family Catholic Church. This occurred in an interfaith service, in which Christian, Muslim, Hindu and Sikh clergymen assembled “to jointly ring the new bell for the first time in the past 50 years”. The church was recently renovated two years back 2021 -22 with beautiful wooden paneling and lighting. The altar has a beautiful Last Supper sculpted out of wood.

== See also ==
- List of Catholic churches in India
- St. Joseph's Catholic Church (Baramulla)
