= Peter Celestine Elampassery =

Indian priest

Most Reverend Dr. Peter Celestine Elampassery, OFM Cap
- Bishop Emeritus of Jammu-Srinagar
- Archdiocese: Delhi
- Diocese: Jammu–Srinagar
- Appointed: 3 April 1998
- Installed: 6 September 1998
- Term ended: 3 December 2014
- Predecessor: Hippolytus Anthony Kunnunkal
- Successor: Ivan Pereira

Orders
- Ordination: 3 October 1966
- Consecration: 6 September 1998 by Alan Basil de Lastic

Personal details
- Born: Peter Celestine Elampassery; 28 June 1938 Muttuchira Kerala India
- Died: 27 May 2015 (aged 76) Bharananganam, Kerala
- Buried: Kerala
- Denomination: Roman Catholic
- Education: Pontifical Gregorian University

Peter Celestine Elampassery OFM, Cap. (28 June 1938 – 27 May 2015) was the 2nd Bishop of the Roman Catholic Diocese of Jammu–Srinagar.

== Early life ==
Peter was born on 28 June 1938, in Muttuchira, Kerala, India. After completing matriculation he joined the Capuchins and took his vows in 1963.

== Priesthood ==
Peter was ordained to the priesthood on 3 October 1966 in Order of Friars Minor Capuchin congregation. He worked in the Agra mission of the Capuchins for some time. He was appointed Superior of the Capuchins in Northern India in 1980. He was sent to Jammu-Srinagar Mission as the Pro-Prefect Apostolic. He was appointed first Vicar of the Diocese when it was created in 1986. He was transferred to Assam-Meghalaya Mission as the Provincial Delegate in 1997.

== Episcopate ==
Elampassery was appointed 2nd Bishop of the Roman Catholic Diocese of Jammu–Srinagar, India, on 3 April 1998. His Episcopal Ordination was on 6 September 1998 and he retired in 2014. He succeeded Bishop Hippolytus Anthony Kunnkunal OFM, Cap. He suffered a stroke in July 2012. He resigned in 2013 due to deteriorating health. His resignation was accepted by the Holy See on 3 December 2014.

== Education ==
Peter Celestine received his Doctorate in Missiology from Pontifical Gregorian University, Rome, Italy in 1978.

== Death ==
He died on 27 May 2015 at Assisi Ashram, Bharananganam, Kerala after prolonged illness and massive heart attack. He was 77.

== Books ==
Early Capuchin Mission in India

== Award ==
Dr. Peter Celestine Elampassery OFM, Cap Received Gandhi Peace Award from Government of Jammu and Kashmir for the formation of peace clubs in schools, cross-border dialogue, and inter-religious meets.

Catholic Church titles
Preceded by Hippolytus Anthony Kunnunkal	Bishop of Jammu-Srinagar; 1998–2014	Succeeded by Ivan Pereira

== See also ==
List of Catholic bishops of India
