= Diocese of Jammu–Srinagar =

Latin Catholic diocese in northern India

Coordinates: 32°42′N 74°51′E

Diocese of Jammu - Srinagar Dioecesis Iammuensis-Srinagarensis जम्मू श्रीनगर के सूबा

Location
- Country: India
- Ecclesiastical province: Delhi
- Metropolitan: Delhi

Statistics
- Area: 222,236 km^{2} (85,806 sq mi)
- Population: Total; Catholics: (as of 2018); 13,384,000; 7,950 (0.1%)
- Parishes: 42
- Schools: 22

Information
- Denomination: Catholic
- Sui iuris church: Latin Church
- Rite: Roman Rite
- Established: 17 January 1952; 73 years ago
- Cathedral: St. Mary's Cathedral, Jammu
- Patron saint: Nativity of the Blessed Virgin Mary
- Secular priests: 43

Current leadership
- Pope: Leo XIV
- Bishop: Ivan Pereira
- Metropolitan Archbishop: Anil Joseph Thomas Couto
- Vicar General: Fr. Jose Vadakkel

Map
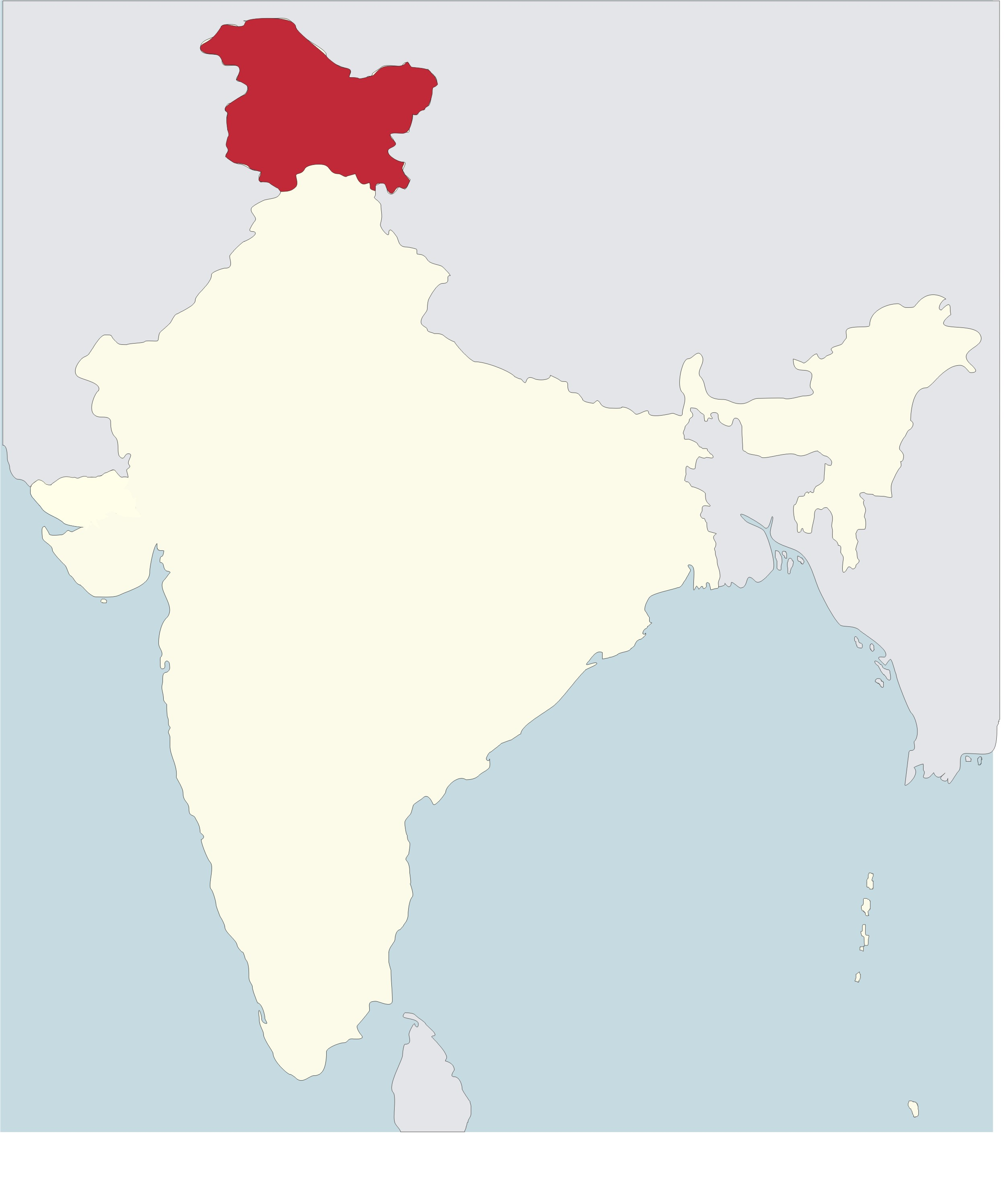

Website
- http://www.jammusrinagardiocese.org

The Diocese of Jammu–Srinagar (Latin: Iammuen(sis)-Srinagaren(sis)) is a Latin Catholic diocese located in the cities of Jammu and Srinagar in the ecclesiastical province of Delhi in India.

== History ==
Catholicism dates back to 1887 in Jammu and Kashmir. The Apostolic Prefecture of Kafirstan and Kashmir was erected from the Diocese of Lahore in 1887. The Prefecture, composed of Rawalpindi, Kashmir and Ladakh, was looked after by the Mill Hill Missionary. Msgr. Ignatius Brouwer MHM was appointed as the first Prefect Apostolic with Rawalpindi as his headquarters. The Apostolic prefecture of Kashmir and Jammu was created on 17 January 1952. Msgr. George Shanks MHM was appointed as the Prefect Apostolic. On 4 May 1968 the Prefecture was renamed as Apostolic Prefecture of Jammu and Kashmir. The Prefecture was entrusted to the Capuchins of St. Joseph's Province, Kerala in 1978 and Rev. Fr. Hippolytus Kunnunkal OFM Cap., was appointed as the first Indian Prefect Apostolic. Prefecture was converted into a Diocese in 1986 and Fr. Hippolytus Kunnunkal OFM Cap was appointed the first Bishop.

== Present ==
The diocese currently comprises four regions:

1. Jammu Region
2. Kashmir Region
3. Ladakh Region
4. Poonch Region

== Leadership ==
  - Msgr. Ignatius Brouwer MHM, Prefect of Kafristan & Kashmir - (1887 - 1894)
  - Msgr. Reyndes MHM, Prefect Of Kafristan & Kashmir - (1894 - 1899)
  - Msgr. Wagener MHM, Prefect Of Kafristan & Kshmir - (1899 - 1914)
  - Msgr. Winkley MHM, Prefect Of Kafristan & Kashmir - (1914 - 1933)
  - Msgr. O' Donhoe MHM, Prefect of Kafristan & Kashmir - (1933 - 1943)
  - Msgr. Mayer MHM, Pro-Prefect Of Kafristan & Kashmir - (1943 - 1952)
  - Msgr. George shanks MHM, Prefect Apostolic of Kashmir & Jammu - (1952 - 1962)
  - Msgr. John Boerkamp MHM, Prefect Apostolic of Kashmir & Jammu - (1962 - 1978)
  - Msgr. Hippolytus Kunnankal OFM Cap. Prefect Apostolic of Kashmir & Jammu - (1978 - 1986)
  - Most Rev. Hippolytus, Kunnunkal OFM Cap., Bishop of Jammu - Srinagar Diocese - (1986 - 1998)
  - Most Rev. Peter Celestine OFM Cap., Bishop of Jammu - Srinagar Diocese - (1998 - 2014)
  - Most Rev. Ivan Pereira, Bishop of Jammu - Srinagar Diocese - (2014–present)
