= St. Mary's Cathedral, Jalandhar =

St. Mary's Cathedral
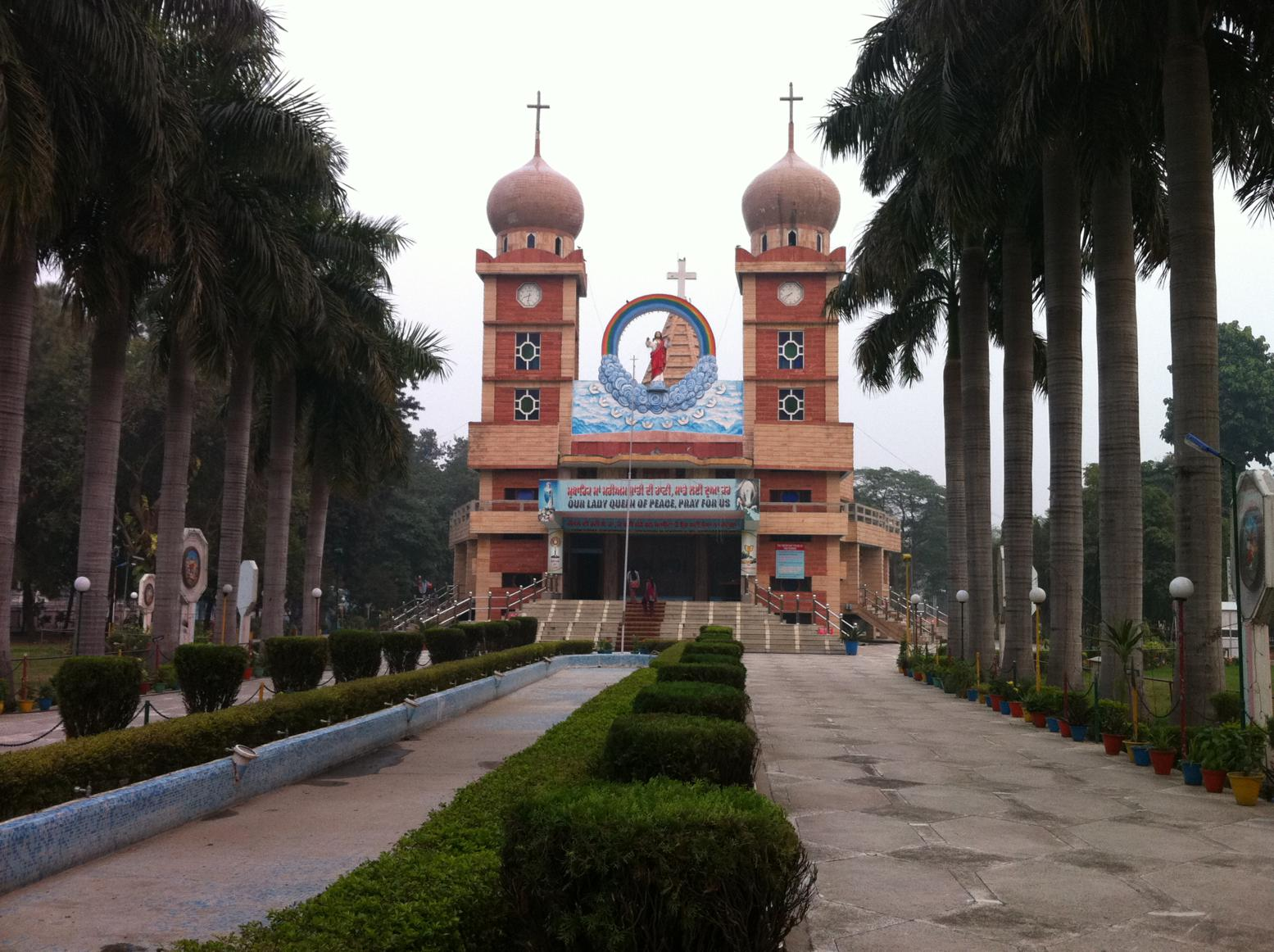
- St. Mary's Cathedral
- St. Mary's Cathedral
- 31.2879°N 75.6200°E
- Location: Jalandhar
- Country: India
- Denomination: Roman Catholic

History
- Status: Cathedral
- Founded: 1847
- Founder: Fr. John Mc Donnel

Architecture
- Functional status: Active

Administration
- Province: Delhi
- Diocese: Jalandhar

Clergy
- Bishop: Most Rev. Jose Sebastian

St. Mary's Cathedral in Jalandhar, Punjab, India, is the seat of the bishop of the Roman Catholic Diocese of Jalandhar. The cathedral is located in the Jalandhar Cantonment. The old church at the same site was dedicated to St. Patrick and was constructed by Rev. Fr. John Mc Donnel, OFMCap of the Vicariate Apostolic of Agra in 1847.

Initially, the area was under the Diocese of Lahore. In 1952, after the partition, the Catholic Mission of the Indian state of Punjab was raised to the status of apostolic prefecture with its headquarters was located at Jalandhar and was handed over from the Belgian province of the Capuchin missionaries to the British province. The church at Jalandhar cantonment became the mother church of Punjab. With the erection of the new Diocese of Jalandhar in 1971, this church gained the status of cathedral of the diocese.

In 1987, the demolition of the old church was initiated and the foundation stone that had been blessed by Pope John Paul II for the new church was laid on 19 April 1987 by Rt. Rev. Dr. Symbhorian Keeprath, bishop of Jalandhar. The new cathedral was inaugurated on Diwali, 29 October 1989.

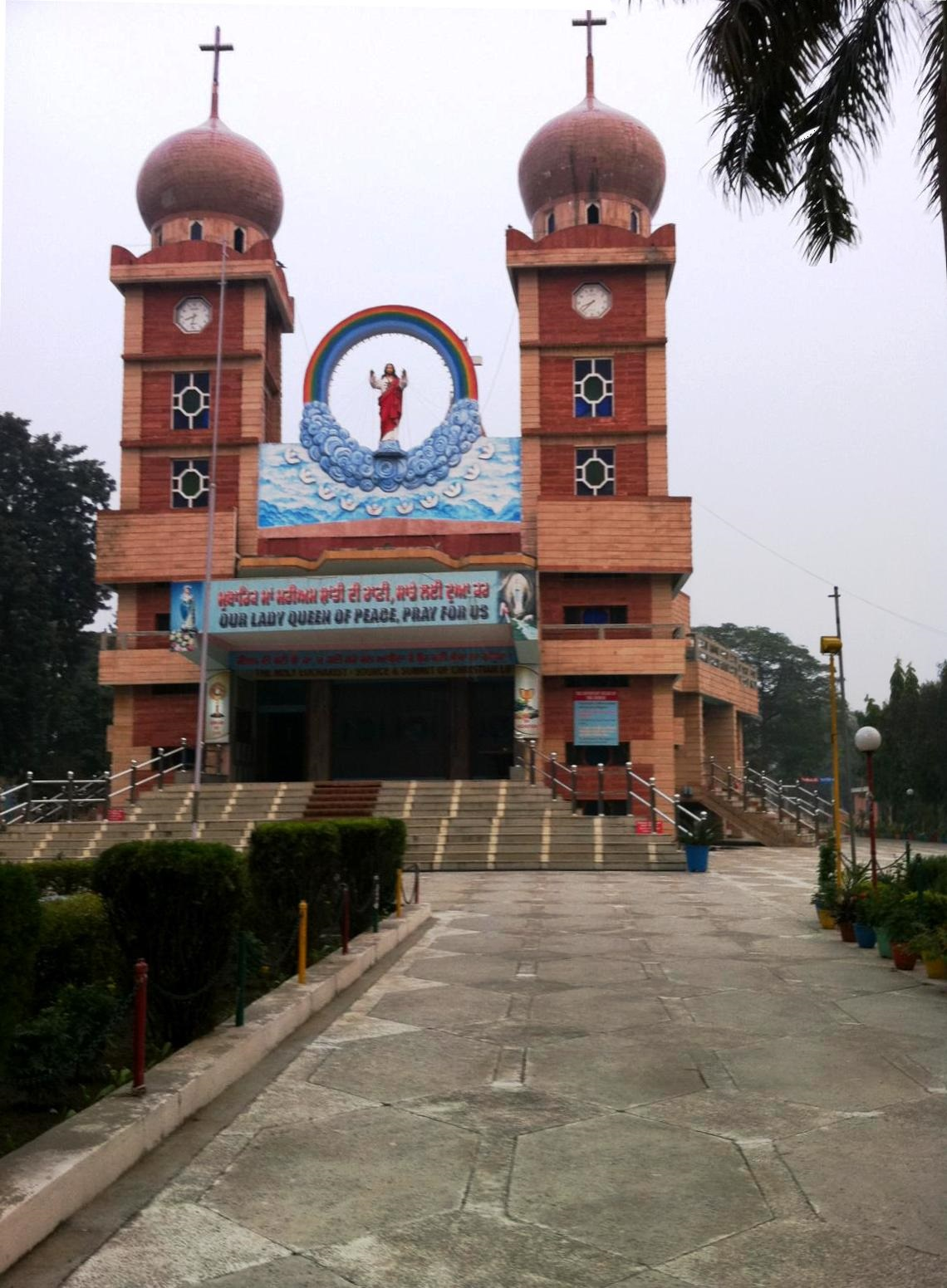
St. Mary's Cathedral
