= Vamona Navelcar =

Portuguese painter (1929–2021)

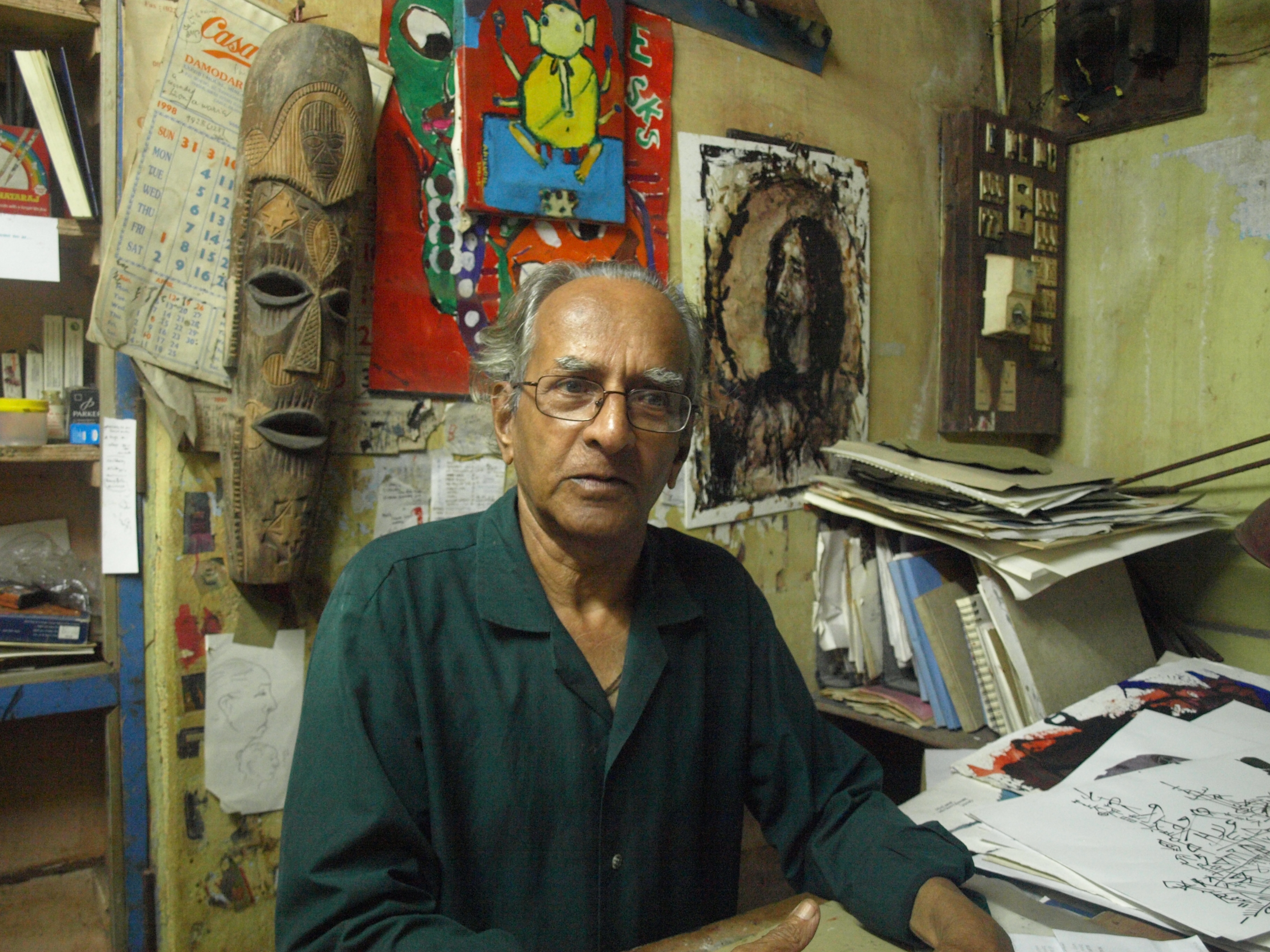
- Navelcar at his residence in 2009
- Born: Vamona Ananta Sinai Navelcar; 5 May 1929; Pomburpa, Goa, Portuguese India
- Died: 18 October 2021 (aged 92); Panaji, Goa, India
- Other name: Ganesh
- Citizenship: Portugal
- Education: Escola de Belas Artes
- Known for: Painting, drawing
- Notable work: Angoch Woman

Vamona Ananta Sinai Navelcar (5 May 1929 – 18 October 2021) was a Portuguese artist (Note: He returned to India in his later years while still a Portuguese citizen) who studied and worked in Portugal, Mozambique, and Goa, India. He began his art career in Mozambique, after training in Portugal, where he also lived for some time. He excelled in Christian figurative art. He adopted the name of Ganesh, after an incident that caused him to be "reborn" and in memory of his brother Ganesh.

Navelcar had been called "a state treasure of Goa, whose remarkable oeuvre spans several decades." He had twice received the Gulbenkian Foundation Fellowships (1963 and 1971) and he won an international award at the International Exhibition of Art in Monte Carlo for his ink drawing, Angoch Woman. He is considered a "prolific master of line" with a specialisation in murals and bas-relief composed of metallic, wooden and glass structures and his works form part of private and museum collections worldwide.

== Life and career ==
=== Early life (1929–1954) ===
Navelcar was born on 5 May 1929 in the village of Pomburpa, Bardes, Goa, Portuguese India. He grew up by drawing and hiding his work from his family, who disapproved of it.

Navelcar joined Bombay University in 1950 and was admitted to the Wardha University to study Hindustani (Hindi) and Urdu. He gained his SSCE and SSC in 1954 and decided not to continue to study medicine as he wanted to pursue arts by then. Returning to Goa, he secured a job with the Chowgule Company as an accountant and continued to produce his art work in his spare time, which was noticed and admired by his colleagues. After being asked by Chowgule, the owner of the company, to do some portraits of dignitaries of the time, including Paulo Bénard Guedes, who was the Governor-General of Portuguese India in 1953, his work was noticed. Guedes asked him to draw a portrait of Dr António de Oliveira Salazar, the then Prime Minister of Portugal, and subsequently awarded him a scholarship to study art in Portugal.

=== Portugal (1954–1963) ===
In 1954, Navelcar set off to Portugal to study, but before he could apply to the Escola de Belas Artes, he first had to study Portuguese as well as other subjects at a secondary level to bring him to the level required for acceptance. The courses and subjects set for him would normally have taken 4 years to complete, but he did them in one year.

In 1955, at the age of 25 he applied to the Escola Superior de Belas Artes and was accepted without reservation. His studies went well but he faced many difficulties, particularly in the early days with the written and spoken Portuguese language. His relationship with his teachers and their assistants was also not good as they seemed to resent his talent and knowledge, though the professors and directors of the institution liked and admired his work.

In December 1961, Goa was annexed by India. The political changes at that time caused great difficulty for Navelcar as he lost his grant to study just six months before he was due to graduate because he would not sign a document denouncing Nehru's Liberation of Goa. However, with the help of one of his professors he was given a grant by the Gulbenkian Foundation in 1963, which allowed him to complete his studies.

In 1962 he graduated from the Escola Superior de Belas Artes with a thesis painting titled A Rotina and a year later completed his postgraduate painting titled, Ramayana. This was an oil interpretation of the Ramayana, which featured Rama and Hanuman on either side of Sita. After graduation, Navelcar tried to get a teaching position in Portugal but everywhere he applied he was rejected.

=== Mozambique (1963–1976) ===
Navelcar soon became desperate and applied to the overseas department and managed to secure a position in Mozambique. In 1963 he set off to Africa, believing he had a position at the technical college in Mozambique's capital Lourenco Marques (now named Maputo). However, on his arrival, the overseas director, Dr Oliveira Boléo told Navelcar that he would be posted to the technical school in Quelimane. So, this is where he started teaching as a professor of geometry and mathematics in Lyceums, first in Quelimane for one year and then onto Nampula, being in Mozambique for thirteen years in total. However, at every step of the way he followed his passion for the arts, teaching those students who were interested in art the different techniques and processes, as well as expanding his own talent, evolving as an artist of the world and one to be reckoned with.

Navelcar had a good life there, having a manservant named Sheriff who he trusted and became extremely fond of as a person. Once again Navelcar taught geometry as a main subject and art as a secondary subject. He was loved by all the students for his gentle and kind manner as well as his talent in teaching. However, when he asked his director for a room for a studio that he could use, he was told there was none spare. Some weeks later Navelcar asked to use one of the toilets that was not used and on this occasion, having no excuses he could think of, the director agreed. This studio was one of the places that Navelcar loved to be to do his creative work in peace and quiet. He described how Francis Baker, too, would display his work in a toilet. During this period, he produced many paintings, drawings and murals, including the Angoch Woman (fisher woman).

Time went by with many rewards and achievements in his art, expanding his talent and trying out new techniques including collages, ceramics, sculptures in metal, wood and other materials. He made many murals and large paintings as well as portraits of dignitaries throughout his time in Africa. He supported the local African people and became very fond of their company and their talents as well as all his students at college, never displaying any discrimination.

==== Imprisonment (1975–1976) ====
As Mozambique fought for its independence through the FRELIMO (Front for the Liberation of Mozambique) movement, Navelcar supported the freedom fighters of Mozambique, often doing murals or helping his students to prepare posters, but never doing it openly or signing his work for fear of being punished by the Portuguese authorities. Navelcar supported freedom of the people to rule themselves, with no external interference from other countries as well as freedom of speech in which ever medium one chooses.

On 25 April 1974 there was a military coup in Portugal called the Carnation Revolution, coupled with much civil unrest which toppled the dictatorial Estado Novo regime. Consequently, by 25 June 1975, the FRELIMO took over governance of Mozambique. Navelcar celebrated with the African communities. At the end of the term the students held a party to celebrate. However, this displeased the new strict communist FRELIMO regime, who arrested all those who attended the party (including Navelcar) on 3 November 1975. They were taken to Imala, a prison camp in the forest some 90 kilometres from Nampula.

They were all held here for eighty one days until they were released on 23 January 1976 after the intervention of Armando Panguene, the newly appointed Provincial Governor in Nampula. During their stay in the prison camp they were subjected to hard labour, digging in the fields and in the cashew plantations, collecting the cashew nuts and apples. Many a time Navelcar refused to go to the fields and devised ways of helping his students by suggesting that they paint and make murals on the walls to revere and help the FRELIMO movement. The commander of the camp agreed in most cases to Navelcar's requests, so in that manner he was able to help his students, particularly the girls, to avoid the hard physical work in the fields. This helped keep up the spirits of both he and his students. Navelcar and his students were released in January 1976 with a convoy of police and parents arriving to bring them all safely back to Nampula.

=== Return to Portugal (1976–1982) ===
During his imprisonment, Navelcar had contracted a severe ear infection, so on his return, he immediately sought medical help. By then most of the Portuguese had left Mozambique so it was difficult to find a qualified doctor. However, there was a Polish doctor still at the government hospital who told him that he should return to Portugal as soon as possible as there were no suitable medicines in the country. Immediately Navelcar made plans to return to Portugal, destroying all his teaching material and books. He packed two suit cases, one with clothes and the other with his work, trophies and certificates. Within eight days he was ready to leave and set off to Portugal, assisted by his trusted servant Sheriff, who was also distraught at Navelcar's decision to leave Africa.

The flight took a long time as the route was tortuous, needing to stop only at places where it was safe to do so. On arrival in Portugal one bag was missing, the one with all his important documents and art work in it. Desperate to find it he tried all manner of contacts but all failed to find the missing case. Distraught by this event, Navelcar sat down and did a drawing signing it "Ganesh," vowing at that time never to sign, “Vamona Navelcar” again. (Further, this indicated his rebirth, and was a tribute to his elder brother Ganesh, who mentored Vamona but died at the age of 15 when Vamona was 6 years old.)

Navelcar managed to secure a pension from the Government of 60% of his last salary form Mozambique, but with escalating prices and turmoil, times were very hard indeed. Eventually, after seven years back in Portugal with no prospect of work or people having spare money for the luxuries of purchasing paintings, Navelcar decided to return to Goa. Quickly forming a plan to leave Portugal, telling no one, even his closest friends until the last moment, he packed his few possessions and his work, booked the flights and asked his dear friend Dr Alexandre Ribeirinho to take him to the airport. So, on 6 October 1982, Vamona Navelcar set off back to his homeland of Goa.

=== Return to Goa (1982–2021) ===
Navelcar returned to Goa to feel "lost and ignored" by the public and even by his own family. He claimed to have returned to try to find peace of mind and tranquility for his soul but added that he has found none. His work is mostly abstract, and he was influenced heavily by European artists. He also admired the work of Goan artists like F. N. Souza and Vasudeo S. Gaitonde.

In 2017, Casa de Goa, a centre for cultural activities which has promoted ties between Goa and Portugal for about 30 years, celebrated their 50th anniversary. As part of the celebrations, the Prime Minister of Portugal, António Costa was presented with a portrait of Portuguese poet Fernando Pessoa, painted by Navelcar. Costa's father, Orlando da Costa, had once visited Navelcar's Pomburpa home and Navelcar had drawn a portrait of him.

=== Death ===
Navelcar died on 18 October 2021 at the age of 92 at a hospital in Panaji.

== Artistry ==
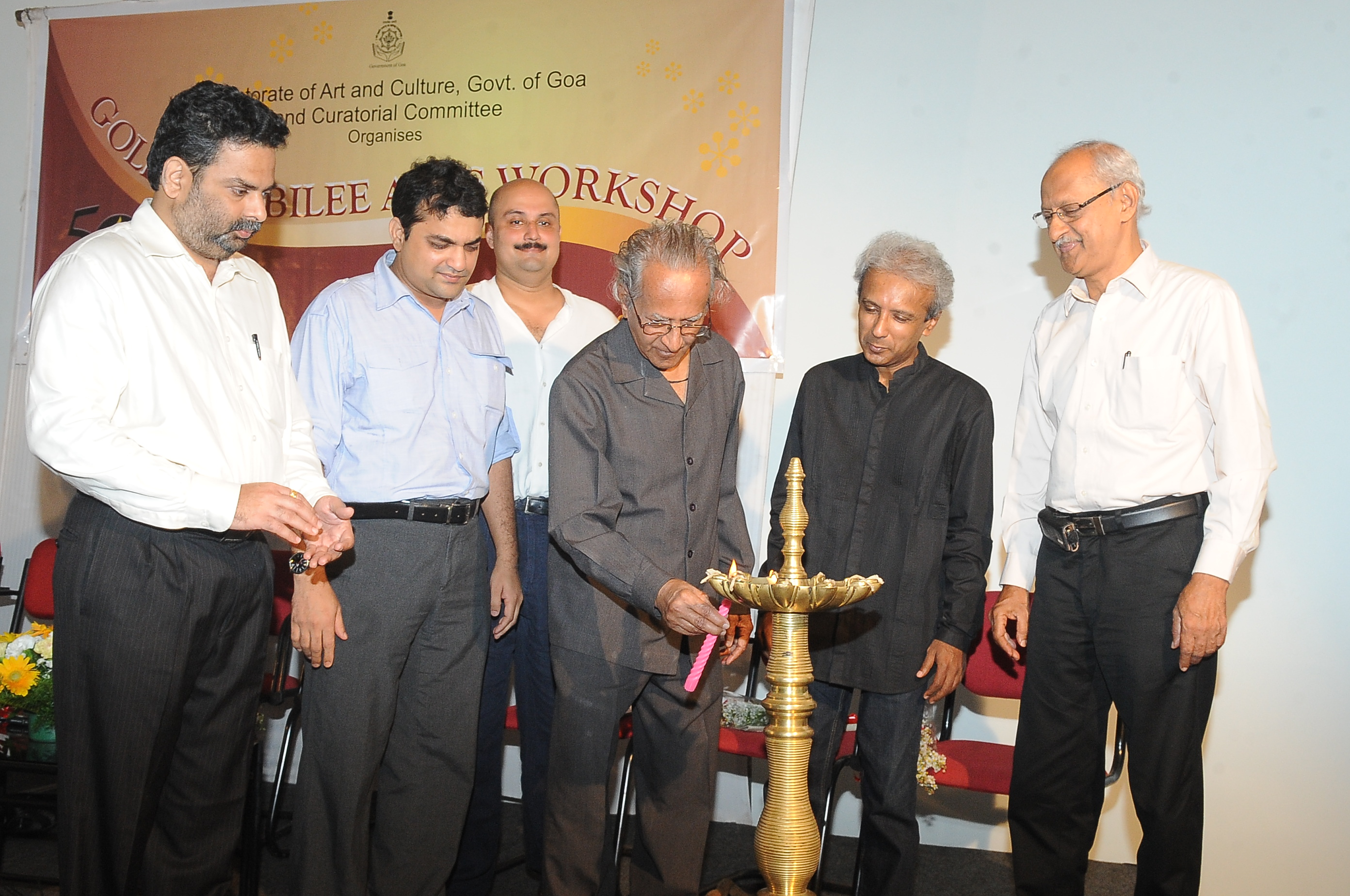
Inaugurating an art event in Goa.

Describing his work in 2012, The Times of India commented: "The ethic extends to the great Vamona Navelcar. Known for his elegant line, for epitomizing gentility, the seniormost contributor has rendered a grotesque skull-bedecked Ogre, a painting that immediately recalls Angelo da Fonseca's Apocalypse (a likewise searing vision painted after a lifetime of making serene images)."

Dr Carmo Gracias from Margao, who owns more than 20 of Navelcar's paintings along with dozens of others by other Goan and Indian artists, describes how Navelcar can quickly create a rendition of Jesus Christ. He claims that Navelcar is exquisite in his style of line drawing, in which he draws an image in a single continuous stroke while not lifting his pencil or pen.

Goan artist Bina Nayak has been quoted as having said that Navelcar is "the M.F. Hussain of Goa," likening him to the famed Indian artist.

== Exhibitions ==
Navelcar's first exhibition was in the early 1960s at the Palacio Foz in Lisbon.

As part of Semana da Cultura (a celebration of Indo-Portuguese cultural fusion) in 2011, Navelcar's work was displayed at the Sunaparanta, Goa Centre for the Arts in an exhibition titled "In dreams the work is born". The exhibition ran from 22 to 31 October 2011.

From 23 June to 9 September 2012, Navelcar exhibited his work at the Figueiro de Vinhos gallery, in the centre of Portugal.

A Retrospective exhibition was held in Portugal from June to October 2012 curated by Vamona's long standing friend and admirer, Professor Antonino Martins Mendes.

On 1 May 2017, an exhibition celebrating his life and work called "The Great Goan Art Festival" was organized by Marius Fernandes at Campal in Panaji.

His works were displayed from 12 December 2017 to 12 January 2018 at the Fundacao Oriente, Panjim, in an exhibition titled Goa/Portugal/Mozambique: The Many Lives of Vamona Navelcar, featuring 16 of his works. The exhibition was curated by R. Benedito Ferrão and co-hosted by the Al-Zulaij Collective; an accompanying book edited by Ferrão was released with the same title as the exhibition. That exhibition would be the last time Navelcar's art would be seen publicly while he was still alive.

== Biographical works ==
The late aeronautical engineer and UK expat Anne Ketteringham wrote a biography on Navelcar in conjunction with VS Arts. The book is called Vamona Navelcar, An Artist of Three Continents and was launched in Goa at Gallery Gitanjali, Panaji on 12 April 2013 with an exhibition of Vamona Navelcar's works from over the decades.

The book Goa/Portugal/Mozambique: The Many Lives of Vamona Navelcar (Fundação Oriente, 2017), edited by R. Benedito Ferrão, was released in 2017 in conjunction with a retrospective of the artist's work in an exhibition of the same title. The book also contains the graphic novella, The Destination is the Journey, written by Ferrão and illustrated by Navelcar; it is loosely based on the artist's life.

An extensive political biography about Navelcar written by R. Benedito Ferrão and Vishvesh Prabhakar Kandolkar appears in the Spring 2022 issue of the journal Verge: Studies in Global Asias and is titled "Canvas Adrift: Vamona Navelcar, Artist of the Unframed Ocean."

Navelcar is the subject of a 2019 documentary on his life titled I am nothing with Ronak Kamat directing it and sound editing by Ashley Fernandes.

== See also ==
- Laxman Pai
- F. N. Souza
- Vasudeo S. Gaitonde
