= Conference of Catholic Bishops of India =

Assembly of Latin Catholic bishops

- CCBI logo
- Abbreviation: CCBI
- Formation: 22 April 1988
- Type: Episcopal conference
- Legal status: Civil nonprofit
- Purpose: To support the ministry of bishops
- Headquarters: Conference of Catholic Bishops of India, CCBI General Secretariat, Bhai Vir Sing Marg 9-10, New Delhi 110001
- Region served: India
- Members: Active and retired Latin Church Catholic bishops of India
- President: Archbishop Filipe Neri Ferrao
- Vice President: Archbishop George Antonysamy
- Secretary – General: Archbishop Anil Joseph Thomas Couto
- Deputy Secretary-General: Rev. Dr. Stephen Alathara
- Affiliations: Federation of Asian Bishops' Conferences
- Website: ccbi.in

The Conference of Catholic Bishops of India (CCBI) is the national episcopal conference of the bishops of the Latin Church of the Catholic Church in India, functioning in accordance with canon 447. There are 132 Latin Catholic dioceses in the country, and 190 active and retired bishops are the members of the CCBI. This is the largest bishops' conference in Asia and the fourth-largest in the world. The CCBI is a member of the Federation of Asian Bishops' Conferences.

The Conference of Catholic Bishops of India enables the Latin Catholic bishops of the country to exchange ideas and information, deliberate on the Church's broad concerns and take care of the pastoral needs of the faithful. The conference is to assist the bishops both in pastoral care and in evangelization, the twin duties of a bishop. One of the main purposes of the CCBI according to its statutes is "to promote that greater good which the Church offers humankind especially through forms and programmes of the apostolate which are adequately adapted to the circumstances of time and place."

== Historical background ==
In 1944 a conference of Indian bishops known as Catholic Bishops' Conference of India (CBCI) was established. When the national episcopal conferences got the juridical and structural recognition during Vatican II, the CBCI began to reorganize itself with infrastructures such as national commissions, regional councils of bishops and national organizations working under its guidance and directives. The promulgation of the Latin 1983 Code of Canon Law in 1983 contributed to the debate about establishing a conference only for the Latin rite bishops. Pope John Paul II, after his visit to India in 1986, wrote an apostolic letter to the Indian bishops on 28 May 1987. An important text of which reads thus: "The bishops of each of the three rites have the right to establish their own episcopal bodies in accordance with their own ecclesiastical legislation. The CBCI which is an assembly of the bishops of India of the three rites is to continue for matters of common concern and of national and supra-ritual character. These areas are to be determined in the new statues of the CBCI".

In compliance with the pope's directive, the CBCI in its general meeting in April 1988 decided that all the three ritual churches could have their own episcopal bodies. Accordingly, the bishops of the Latin Church started their own episcopal conference in the same meeting and named it "Conference of Catholic Bishops of India – Latin Rite" (CCBI-LR). In January 1994, the Holy See approved its statutes. Hence, the Conference of Catholic Bishops of India is an organization having its legal foundation in canon law, which applies to the Catholic church of the Roman rite throughout the world. Therefore, according to canons 447–459, the CCBI is the central church body of the bishops in India and its purpose is to deliberate on matters of concern for the whole Latin church and encourage activities in accordance with the needs of the times. The members of the CCBI are: 1) The diocesan bishops, their coadjutors, and auxiliaries, 2) The administrators of the dioceses when the Episcopal See is vacant, 3) The retired bishops and, 4) those honorary bishops appointed by the Holy See or the bishops' conference for particular tasks.

The bishops' conference is headed by a president, who is overall in-charge and represents the conference, a vice president and a secretary general to assist him for a term of two years. The bishops' conference, in addition to plenary assemblies, has an executive committee to handle ordinary matters, the commissions and the secretariat.

== Organizational structure ==
At first, an ad hoc office bearers body consisting of a president and vice president was elected and a small team of four bishops forming the executive committee assisted it. At its Third Plenary Assembly in Goa (1991) a full team of office bearers was elected and an executive committee consisting of the office bearers, all the metropolitans of the Latin ecclesiastical provinces and the chairpersons of CCBI commissions was constituted. The Holy See approved its statues on 13 January 1994. At the lapse of five years in 1999 and in the light of the Apostolos Suos, the statutes were revised and the Holy See permanently approved them on 3 December 2000 (Prot. 5242/00). The Conference of Catholic Bishops of India was registered under the Societies Registration Act XXI of 1860. Regd. No.S/19920 of 1 May 1989.

=== Executive committee ===
The executive committee acts as the Administrative Board. It meets at least once a year mainly to see that the decisions, resolutions and recommendations of the Conference are duly implemented. It is composed of:

1. The office bearers of the conference (president, vice president and secretary general).
2. The metropolitans (archbishops of Agra, Bangalore, Bhopal, Bombay, Calcutta, Calicut, Cuttack-Bhubaneswar, Delhi, Gandhinagar, Goa and Daman, Guwahati, Hyderabad, Imphal, Madras-Mylapore, Madurai, Nagpur, Patna, Pondicherry-Cuddalore, Raipur, Ranchi, Shillong, Trivandrum, Verapoly and Vizhakapattanam).
3. The chairmen of the CCBI commissions.

=== Plenary Assembly ===
The Bishops of the Latin Catholic Church in India are the members of the Plenary Assembly of the conference. The Ordinary Plenary Assembly of the conference is held every year. Extraordinary Plenary Assemblies are held according to the need decided by at least a two-thirds of the members of the executive committee.

At the Plenary Assembly the conference reviews the situation and assesses the progress of the Church in India, and in the light of its own purposes it decides on plans that may be needed and actions that may be envisaged.

The reports of the twelve commissions, regional bishops' councils are submitted every two years in the Plenary Assembly. While the report of the secretary general is published along with the Report of the Annual General Body Meeting of the CCBI, the Biennial Reports of the CCBI Commissions and regional bishops' councils are printed separately just before the meeting. Whereas the reports of the various proceedings of the annual Plenary Assembly and reports of the secretary general are published every year. The reports of the commissions normally find place in the agenda booklet of the Plenary Assembly or they are printed in a separate booklet.

=== Plenary Assemblies ===
- 1st PA: 14 April 1988, Kottayam on Various Topics
- 2nd PA: 6, 7, 16, 17 November 1989, Sacred Heart College, Shillong on Various Topics
- 3rd PA: 6–8 January 1991, Pilar, Goa on Evangelization in India
- 4th PA: 6 &14 January 1992, Ishvani Kendra, Pune on Various Topics
- 5th PA: 4–6 January 1993, St. Pius College, Bombay Catechism of the Catholic Church
- 6th PA: 3–4 March 1994 Holy Family Hospital, New Delhi Various topics
- 7th PA: 5–7 January 1995, Morning Star College, Barrackpore (Calcutta) Pro-Life
- 8th PA: 12 & 22 February 1996, St. Mary's Malankara Major Seminary, Trivandrum, Various Topics
- 9th PA: 9–12 January 1997, St. Joseph's Seminary, Mangalore on Inculturation
- 10th PA: 18–20 March 1998, Nav Sadhana, Varanasi on Various topics
- 11th PA: 6–10 January 1999, St. John's Regional Seminary, Hyderabad on The Bishop Servant of the Gospel of Christ for the Hope of the World
- 12th PA: 25 – 28 January 2000, St. Joseph's Engineering College, Chennai on The Priest and the third Christian Millennium
- 13th PA: 10–13 January 2001, Morning Star College, Barrackpore (Calcutta), Laity in a Participatory Church
- 14th PA: 26–28 February 2002, Trinity College, Jalandhar, CCBI at the Service of the Community
- 15th PA: 15–19 January 2003, St. Paul's Seminary, Tiruchirapalli, Sharing the Good News
- 16th PA: 10 January 2004, Mary Matha Major Seminary, Trichur, Recommendations from the Special Commission for Evangelization
- 17th PA: 4–8 March 2005, Social Development Centre, Ranchi on Family
- 18th PA: 11 February 2006, St. Peter's Pontifical Seminary, Bangalore, One day PA further reflection on CCBI service of the Dioceses
- 19th PA: 4–9 January 2007, St. Joseph's Pontifical Seminary, Carmelgiri, Alwaye on The Vocation and Role of the Laity in the Life and Mission of the Church
- 20th PA: 16 February 2008, Xavier Institute of Labour Relations, Jamshedpur on Various topics
- 21st PA: 12–18 February 2009, Pallotine Theology Centre (Prabhodhana Mysore) on The Word of God in the Life and Mission of the Church
- 22nd PA: 27 February 2010, Don Bosco Centre, Guwahati on Various topics
- 23rd PA: 6–12 January 2011 Sacred Heart Seminary, Chennai on Catechetical Renewal, Essential for a Vibrant Church in India
- 24th PA: 5 February 2012, St. John's National Academy of Health Sciences, Bangalore on Various Topics
- 25th PA: 5–10 February 2003 Shrine Retreat House, Vailankanni, Pastoral Plan for the Church in India
- 26th PA: 9 February 2014, Alphonsian Pastoral Institute, Palai, Various topics
- 27th PA: 3–9 February 2015 St. John's National Academy of Health Sciences, Bangalore, Liturgy and Life
- 28th PA: 6 March 2016 St. John's National Academy of Health Sciences, Bangalore on Various Topics
- 29th PA: 31 Jan - 8 Feb 2017, Pastoral Centre, Ashaniketan Campus, Bhopal, Promoting Love and Joy in Our Families
- 30th PA: 4 February 2018 St. John's National Academy of Health Sciences, Bangalore on Various Topics
- 31st PA: 7 to 14 January 2019 at Joe Animation Centre, Mahabalipuram, Chennai, Tamil Nadu on "Joy of the Gospel
- 32nd PA: 16 February 2020 at St. John's National Academy of Health Sciences, Bangalore on Various Topics
- 33rd PA: 2 to 12 February 2021 at Xavier University International Centre, Bhubaneswar, Odisha(Cancelled due to COVID-19 pandemic)
- 33rd PA: 11–12 November 2022 at St. John’s National Academy of Health Sciences, Bangalore on Various Topics.
- 34th PA: 21 to 31 January 2023 at St. John's National Academy of Health Sciences, Bangalore on “Telling the Story of Jesus in our Context: The Synodal Way.”
- 35th PA: 30 January 2024 at St. John's National Academy of Health Sciences, Bangalore on Various Topics
- 36th PA: 28 January to 4 February 2025 at XIM University, Bhubaneswar on “Discerning Synodal Pathways for Mission.”
- 37th PA: 3 February 2026 at St. John's National Academy of Health Sciences, Bangalore on Various Topics

=== CCBI Secretariats in India ===
CCBI General Secretariat, Ne Delhi : The CCBI General Secretariat of the Conference of Catholic Bishops of India is located in the national capital, New Delhi. The Deputy Secretary General operates from the General Secretariat. The Secretariat coordinates the ministries of the 16 Commissions, 7 Departments, and 4 Apostolates of the CCBI. The Commission for Migrants, the Public Relations Department, and the Legal Cell of the CCBI also function from the General Secretariat.

The first CCBI Secretariat was established in Goa in 1988. It was shifted to Delhi in 1992. In Delhi, it functioned from the CCBI Secretariat, Pitampura, from 1992 to 1995, and from the Archbishop’s House, Delhi, from 1995 to 1996. In 1997, the CCBI established its first independent Secretariat in Delhi at 9–10, Bhai Vir Singh Marg, New Delhi 110001.

In 2002, the CCBI set up a Secretariat in Bangalore for three Commissions and in 2003 the office of the Deputy Secretary General was shifted to Bangalore. In 2013, the CCBI Plenary Assembly held in Vailankanni decided to relocate the CCBI General Secretariat to New Delhi. The building was then handed over to Caritas India for their use.

In 2024, the CCBI took back the building and renovated it. After the renovation, the CCBI Secretariat in Delhi was blessed and inaugurated on 3 June 2025. Following this, the office of the Deputy Secretary General was relocated to the national capital, New Delhi.

CCBI Centre, Bangalore: The CCBI Centre, Bangalore, is the documentation centre and a Secretariat of the Episcopal Conference. The Associate Deputy Secretary General, the Executive Secretaries of the Commissions for Bible and for Vocations, Seminaries, Clergy and Religious, along with the Associate Director of Communio, reside and operate from the CCBI Centre, Bangalore.

The CCBI Centre was inaugurated on 14 September 2002 as the Secretariat for the CCBI Commissions for Bible, Catechetics, and Liturgy. In 2003, the Deputy Secretary General shifted his office from Delhi to the Bangalore Secretariat. From 2003 to 2025, the CCBI Centre in Bangalore functioned as the General Secretariat of the Episcopal Conference.

The CCBI launched Communio in 2017, and the CCBI Centre also serves as the Secretariat of Communio. The Commission for Liturgy, Departments of Documentation, Publications and the CCBI Project Desk also operate from the CCBI Centre.

Shanti Sadan, Goa: Shanti Sadan is the CCBI Secretariat Extension in Benaulim, Goa. It was inaugurated on 6 January 2020. Three of the CCBI Commission Secretaries are operating from Shanti Sadan. The building was constructed by FABC in 2003 for the Commission for Evangelization. The FABC closed its office in Goa and the CCBI bought it on 16 December 2018. The CCBI renovated the building and constructed a chapel and conference hall. The Shanti Sadan was registered under the Societies Registration number MGO-4-12-2021 dated 6 July 2021.

Suvarta Kendra, Bhopal: Suvarta Kendra, the secretariat for the CCBI's Commission for Proclamation, has moved from its original location in Pachmarhi (established 2011) to Seva Sadan, Bhopal. This relocation, effective July 2024, follows a period of prayer and discernment by the CCBI Executive Committee. The centre remains dedicated to promoting evangelization and providing ongoing missionary animation and formation for the Church in India.

Bethania, Faridabad: Bethania is the Secretariat of the CCBI Youth Commission and the ICYM and YCS/YSM also operate from Bethania. It was inaugurated on 13 September 2019. The property and building of Bethania belong to the Archdiocese of Delhi. On 8 September 2025 the Archdiocese of Delhi handed over the property to the CCBI through a lease agreement.

CCBI Secretariat for Pontifical Mission Organisations , Bangalore: The Pontifical Mission Organizations (PMO) is a group of Catholic missionary societies under the canonical jurisdiction of the Bishop of Rome. In India, the PMO functions under the guidance and direction of the CCBI. The PMO includes four organizations: the Society for the Propagation of the Faith, the Society of St. Peter the Apostle, the Holy Childhood Association, and the Missionary Union of Priests and Religious. At present, the Director resides and operates from the PMO Secretariat.

The Pontifical Mission Societies began their work in India in 1948, in a different pastoral and ecclesial context. When the CCBI was established in 1988, the Pontifical Mission Societies came under the CCBI, in accordance with Articles 56–70 of the International Statutes of the PMS, since the CCBI is the canonical Episcopal Conference. On 25 September 2018, the PMO was registered as a Trust under the CCBI. Later, the Holy Childhood became a separate legal entity to manage its own FCRA account. The Holy Childhood Trust was registered on 26 March 2021.

With the approval of the PMS Rome, the CCBI demolished the old PMO building and constructed a new one. The new PMO building was blessed and inaugurated on 7 February 2026.

=== Office Bearers of the CCBI ===
- President: Filipe Neri Ferrão, Archbishop of Goa and Damam
- Vice President: George Antonysamy, Archbishop of Madras-Mylapore
- Secretary General: Anil Joseph Thomas Couto, Archbishop of Delhi
- Deputy Secretary General: Stephen Alathara, from Verapoly Archdiocese

==== Presidents of CCBI ====
1. Archbishop Henry D'Souza: 1988–1990; 1991-1992
2. Cardinal Simon Pimenta: 1993–1995; 1995-1997
3. Archbishop Marianus Arokiasamy: 1997-1999
4. Archbishop Henry D'Souza: 1999-2001
5. Archbishop Telesphore Toppo: 2001-2004
6. Cardinal Oswald Gracias: 2005-2010
7. Cardinal Telesphore P. Toppo: 2011-2013
8. Cardinal Oswald Gracias: 2013 –2019
9. Archbishop Filipe Neri Ferrao 2019-

==== Vice-Presidents of CCBI ====
1. Archbishop Leobard D'Souza : 1988
2. Archbishop Marianus Arockiasamy: 1991
3. Archbishop Casimir Gnanadickam: 1993
4. Archbishop Marianus Arockiasamy: 1994
5. Bishop Patrick D'Souza: 1996
6. Archbishop Telesphore P. Toppo: 1998-2002
7. Bishop Valerian D'souza: 2002-2007
8. Archbishop Vincent M. Concessao: 2007-2011
9. Archbishop Filipe Neri Ferrão: 2011-2017
10. Archbishop George Antonysamy: 2017 -2025
11. Archbishop Peter Machado: 2025-

==== Secretary General of CCBI ====
1. Archbishop Angelo Fernandes: 1989
2. Bishop Joseph Rodericks: 1991
3. Archbishop Ignatius Paul Pinto: 1994-1998
4. Bishop Thomas Dabre: 1998-2005
5. Archbishop Prakash Mallavarapu: 2005-2011
6. Bishop Varghese Chakkalakal: 2011 - 2017
7. Archbishop Anil Joseph Thomas Couto: 2017 -2025
8. Archbishop Vincent Aind : 2025-

==== Deputy Secretaries General of CCBI ====
1. Rev. Dr. Mario Saturnino Dias: 1989-1991
2. Rev. Dr. Arulsamy: 1991-2002
3. Rev. Dr. Simon Sebastian: 2002-2006
4. Rev. Dr. Udumala Bala: 2006-2013
5. Rev. Dr. Stephen Alathara: 2014-

=== CCBI Commissions and Chairmen ===
1. Commission for Boundary Chairman: Most Rev. Filipe Neri Ferrão, Archbishop of Goa and Daman Member: Most Rev. George Antonysamy, Archbishop of Madras-Mylapore Member: Most Rev. Anil Joseph Thomas Couto, Archbishop of Delhi

2. Commission for Bible Chairman: Most Rev. Antonysamy Peter Abir, Bishop of Sultanpet Member: Most Rev. Joseph Raja Rao S.M.M., Bishop of Vijayawada Member: Most Rev. John Rodrigues, Auxiliary Bishop of Bombay

3. Commission for Canon Law and Other Legislative Texts Chairman: Most Rev. Derek Fernandes, Bishop of Karwar Member: Most Rev. Cajetan Francis Osta, Bishop of Muzaffarpur Member: Most Rev. Sebastian Thekethecheril, Bishop of Vijayapuram

4. Commission for Catechetics Chairman: Most Rev. Thomas Ignatius Macwan, Archbishop of Gandhinagar Member: Most Rev. Jojo Anand, Bishop of Hazaribag Member: Most Rev. Antonisamy Francis, Bishop of Kumbakonam

5. Commission for Ecology Chairman: Most Rev. Allwyn D'Silva, Auxiliary Bishop of Bombay Member: Most Rev. Ivan Pereira, Bishop of Jammu-Srinagar Member: Most Rev. Kishor Kumar Kujur, Bishop of Rourkela

6. Commission for Ecumenism Chairman: Most Rev. Francis Serrao, SJ, Bishop of Shimoga Member: Most Rev. Arulappan Amalraj, Bishop of Ootacamund Member: Most Rev. Thomas Dabre, Bishop of Poona

7. Commission for Family Chairman: Most Rev. Sebastian Kallupura, Co-adjutor Bishop of Patna Member: Most Rev. Peter Paul Saldanha, Bishop of Mangalore Member: Most Rev. Thomas Aquinas, Bishop of Coimbatore

8. Commission for Laity Chairman: Most Rev. Eugene Joseph, Bishop of Varanasi Member: Most Rev. Peter Machado, Archbishop of Bangalore Member: Most Rev. Stephen Lepcha, Bishop of Darjeeling

9. Commission for Liturgy Chairman: Most Rev. Peter Paul Saldanha, Bishop of Mangalore Member: Most Rev. Paul Toppo, Bishop of Raigarh Member: Most Rev. Niranjan Sualsingh, Bishop of Sambalpur

10. Commission for Migrants Chairman: Most Rev. Victor Henry Thakur, Archbishop of Raipur Member: Most Rev. Elias Gonsalves, Bishop of Amravati Member: Most Rev. Soundararaju Periyanayagam, SDB, Bishop of Vellore

11. Commission for Proclamation Chairman: Most Rev. Raphy Manjaly, Bishop of Allahabad Member: Most Rev. George Palliparambil, SDB, Bishop of Miao Member: Most Rev. Sebastianappan Singaroyan, Bishop of Salem

12. Commission for Small Christian Communities Chairman: Most Rev. Ignatius Loyola Mascarenhas, Bishop of Simla Member: Most Rev. Selvister Ponnumuthan, Bishop of Punalur Member: Most Rev. Gerald John Mathias, Bishop of Lucknow

13. Commission for Theology and Doctrine Chairman: Most Rev. Felix Toppo, SJ, Archbishop of Ranchi Member: Most Rev. Albert D'Souza, Archbishop of Agra Member: Most Rev. Lawrence Pius Dorairaj, Bishop of Dharmapuri

14. Commission for Vocations, Seminaries, Clergy and Religious Chairman: Most Rev. Udumala Bala, Bishop of Warangal Member: Most Rev. Vincent Aind, Bishop of Bagdogra Member: Most Rev. Varghese Chakkalakal, Bishop of Calicut

15. Commission for Women Chairman: Most Rev. Francis Kalist, Bishop of Meerut Member: Most Rev. Binay Kandulna, Bishop of Khunti Member: Most Rev. Gerald Isaac Lobo, Bishop of Udupi

16. Commission for Youth Chairman: Most Rev. Nazarene Soosai, Bishop of Kottar Member: Most Rev. Ignatius D'Souza, Bishop of Bareilly Member: Most Rev. Henry D'Souza, Bishop of Bellary

== Regional Latin Rite bishops' councils ==
Name	Provinces	Dioceses	States / UTs	Major liturgical languages	Number of Catholics
Agra Regional Bishops' Council (ARBC)	Agra	Agra, Ajmer, Allahabad, Bareilly, Jaipur, Jhansi, Lucknow, Meerut, Udaipur, Varanasi	Uttar Pradesh, Rajasthan, Uttarakhand, small parts of Madhya Pradesh	Hindi, Nepali	105,000
Bengal Regional Bishops' Council (BRBC)	Calcutta	Calcutta, Asansol, Bagdogra, Baruipur, Darjeeling, Jalpaiguri, Krishnagar, Raiganj	West Bengal, Sikkim, entire county of Bhutan	Bengali	556,000
Jharkhand Regional Bishops' Council (JRBC)	Ranchi	Ranchi, Daltonganj, Dumka, Gumla, Jamshedpur, Khunti, Port-Blair, Simdega, Hazaribag	Jharkhand, Andaman and Nicobar Islands, small parts of West Bengal	Santhali	790,000
Bihar Regional Bishops' Council (BRBC)	Patna	Patna, Bettiah, Bhagalpur, Buxar, Muzaffarpur, Purnea	Bihar, small parts of Jharkhand	Hindi	129,000
Council of Bishops of Chhattisgarh (CBCG)	Raipur	Raipur, Ambikapur, Jashpur, Raigarh	Chattisgarh	Hindi	790,000
Karnataka Regional Catholic Bishops' Council (KRCBC)	Bangalore	Bangalore, Bellary, Belgaum, Chikmagalur, Gulbarga, Karwar, Mangalore, Mysore, Shimoga, Udupi	Karnataka, small parts of Maharashtra and Kerala	Kannada, Konkani, Tamil	975,000
Kerala Regional Latin Catholic Bishops' Council (KRLCBC)	Verapoly, Trivandrum (Latin Rite), Calicut	Verapoly, Cochin, Kottapuram, Vijayapuram, Trivandrum, Alleppey, Neyyatinkara, Punalur, Quilon, Calicut, Kannur, Sultanpet	Kerala, small parts of Tamil Nadu	Malayalam	1,476,000
Council of Bishops of Madhya Pradesh (CBMP)	Bhopal	Bhopal, Gwalior, Indore, Jabalpur, Jhabua, Khandwa	Madhya Pradesh	Hindi	129,000
Regional Bishops' Council of the North (RBCN)	Delhi	Delhi, Jammu-Srinagar, Jalandhar, Simla-Chandigarh	Delhi, Jammu and Kashmir, Ladakh, Himachal Pradesh, Punjab, Haryana, Chandigarh	Hindi, Punjabi	238,000
North Eastern Regional Bishops' Council (NERBC)	Shillong, Guwahati, Imphal	Shillong, Agartala, Aizawl, Jowai, Nongstoin, Tura, Guwahati, Bongaigaon, Dibrugarh, Diphu, Itanagar, Miao, Tezpur, Imphal, Kohima	Arunachal Pradesh, Assam, Manipur, Meghalaya, Mizoram, Nagaland, Tripura	Khasi, Garo, Bodo, Kokborok	1,316,000
Odisha Bishops' Regional Council (OBRC)	Cuttack-Bhubaneshwar	Cuttack- Bhubaneswar, Balasore, Berhampur, Rourkela, Sambalpur	Odisha	Odiya	434,000
Tamil Nadu Bishops' Council (TNBC)	Madras-Mylapore, Madurai, Pondicherry-Cuddalore	Madras-Mylapore, Chingleput, Coimbatore, Ootacamund, Vellore, Madurai, Dindigul, Kottar, Kuzhithurai, Palayamkottai, Sivagangai, Tiruchirappalli, Tuticorin, Pondicherry-Cuddalore, Dharmapuri, Kumbakonam, Salem, Thanjavur	Tamil Nadu, Puducherry, small parts of Kerala	Tamil	3,740,000
Telugu Catholic Bishops' Council (TCBC)	Hyderabad, Visakhapatnam	Hyderabad, Cuddapah, Khammam, Kurnool, Nalgonda, Warangal, Visakhapatnam, Eluru, Guntur, Nellore, Srikakulam, Vijayawada	Andhra Pradesh, Telangana	Telugu	1,544,000
Western Regional Bishops' Council	Bombay, Nagpur, Goa and Daman, Gandhinagar	Bombay, Nashik, Poona, Vasai, Nagpur, Amravati, Aurangabad, Goa and Daman, Sindhudurg, Gandhinagar, Ahmedabad, Baroda	Maharashtra, Gujarat, Goa, Daman and Diu and Dadra and Nagar Haveli, small parts of Madhya Pradesh	Konkani, Marathi, Gujarati	1,574,000
