= Diocese of Jalandhar =

Latin Catholic diocese in Himachal Pradesh and Punjab, India

Coordinates: 31.2879°N 75.6198°E

Diocese of Jalandhar Dioecesis Iullundurensis जालंधर के सूबा
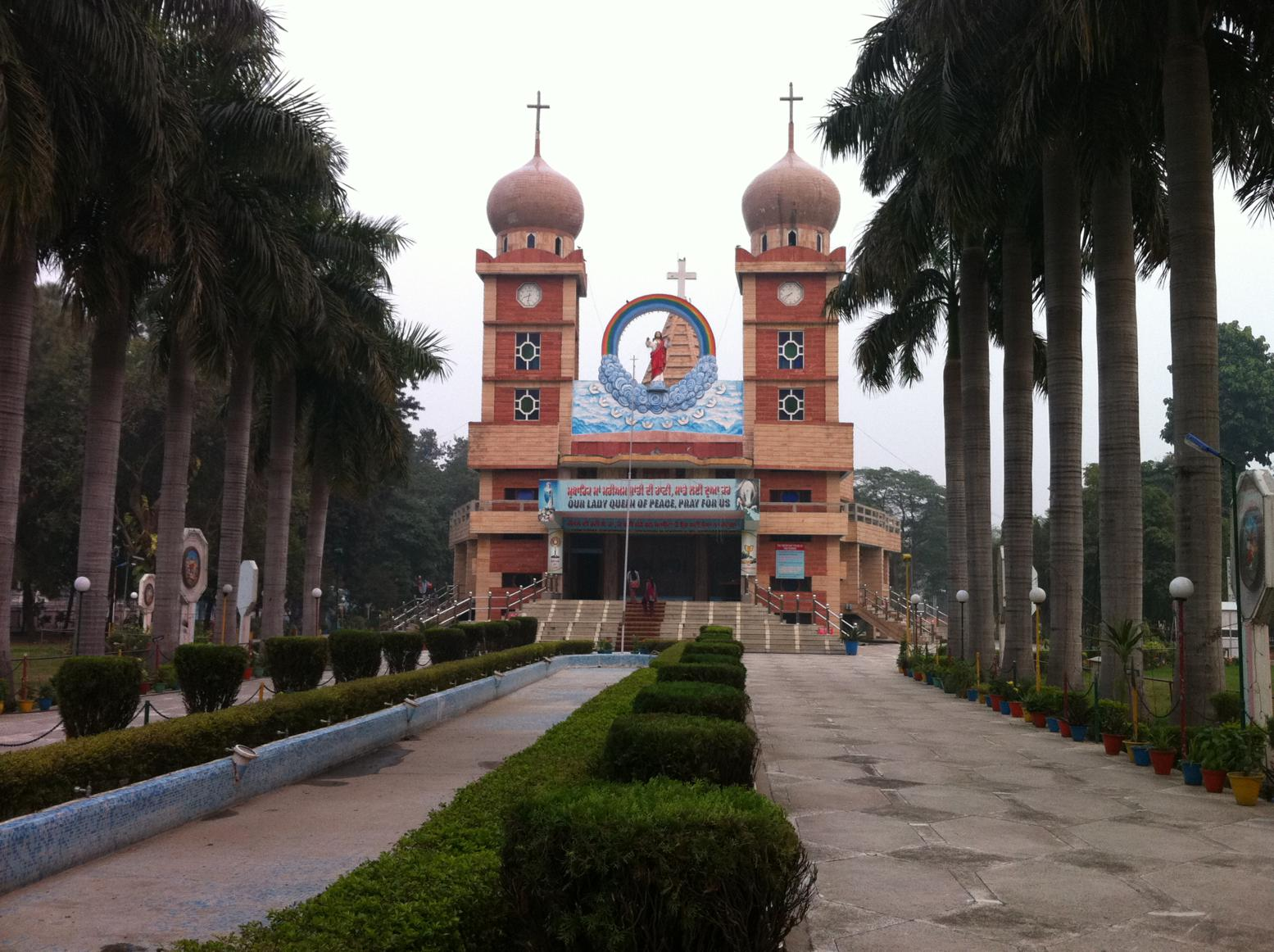
- St. Mary's Cathedral

Location
- Country: India
- Ecclesiastical province: Delhi

Statistics
- Area: 51,120 km^{2} (19,740 sq mi)
- Population: Total; Catholics: (as of 2015); 19,296,682; 113,259 (0.6%)
- Parishes: 110

Information
- Denomination: Catholic
- Sui iuris church: Latin Church
- Rite: Roman Rite
- Cathedral: St. Mary's Cathedral
- Patron saint: Blessed Virgin Mary (Nativity), St. Francis of Assisi
- Secular priests: 89

Current leadership
- Pope: Leo XIV
- Bishop: Jose Sebastian
- Metropolitan Archbishop: Anil Joseph Thomas Couto
- Bishops emeritus: Franco Mulakkal

Website
- jalandhardiocese.com

The Diocese of Jalandhar / Jullundur (Latin: Iullunduren(sis)) is a Latin Catholic diocese of the Catholic Church, located in the city of Jalandhar in the ecclesiastical province of Delhi in India.

== History ==
- 17 January 1952: Established as the Apostolic Prefecture of Jalandhar from the Diocese of Lahore
- 6 December 1971: Promoted as Diocese of Jalandhar

== Leadership ==
- Bishops of Jalandhar (Latin Church)
  - Bishop Jose Sebastian 12 July - Present
  - Bishop Franco Mulakkal (4 August 2013 – 1 June 2023)
  - Bishop Anil Joseph Thomas Couto (16 April 2007 – 30 November 2012)
  - Bishop Symphorian Thomas Keeprath, O.F.M. Cap. (18 March 1972 – 24 February 2007)
- Prefects Apostolic of Jalandhar (Latin Church)
  - Fr. Alban of Blackburn, O.F.M. Cap. (31 October 1952 – 1971)

== Sexual assault case ==
IN 2021, a court ruled Bishop Franco was not guilty. On 14 January 2022, the Additional Sessions Court acquitted him of all charges. In 2018 a rape complaint against Jalandhar Bishop Franco Mulakkal, the police received a copy of the victim nun's statement, given to Changanasseri, Kerala Judicial First Class Magistrate under Section 164 of Code of Criminal Procedure (CrPC, India). Kerala Police arrested Franco Mulakkal for allegedly raping a nun multiple times between 2014 and 2016. The arrest was made in September 2018 in Kochi, India. He was interrogated by the Kerala Police for three days before arrest. Vijay Sakhare, inspector general of Kerala Police said "After our investigation, we have enough evidence that the bishop, prima facie, has committed the crime." On September 20, 2018, Pope Francis accepted Mulakki's request for a leave of absence.

On 8 October 2018, Bishop Agnelo Gracias took office as apostolic administrator sede plena et ad nutum Sanctae Sedis of the diocese, after Mulakkal's arrest. In 2022, the trial court found Bishop Franco not guilty and free from all the charges.
