= Vincent Conçessao =

Roman Catholic archbishop

His Excellency Vincent Michael Conçessao
- Archbishop Emeritus of Delhi
- Church: Catholic Church
- See: Delhi
- Appointed: 19 November 2000
- Retired: 30 November 2012
- Predecessor: Alan Basil de Lastic
- Successor: Anil Joseph Thomas Couto

Orders
- Ordination: 4 December 1961
- Consecration: 1 April 1995 by Alan Basil de Lastic

Personal details
- Born: 28 September 1936 (age 90) Puttur, Madras Presidency, British India
- Denomination: Roman Catholic
- Education: Loyola University Chicago
- Motto: "To bear witness to the lord"

Vincent Michael Conçessao (born 28 September 1936) is a prominent Indian Catholic (Latin Rite) clergyman who was installed as the fifth Archbishop of Delhi in November 2000. He served as Vice President of the Catholic Bishops' Conference of India from 2000 to 2004.

== Birth and education ==
Vincent Michael Conçessao was born on 28 September 1936 at Puttur in South Kanara district, Karnataka state, the fifth of eight children in a middle-class family. His parents were devout Catholics. He attended St. Francis Xavier Primary School and then St Philomena's Boy's High School, Puttur for his secondary education. In 1961 he joined St. Joseph's Seminary at Jeppu in Mangalore. His father died that year. He was ordained in Mangalore on 4 December 1961.

In 1962 Conçessao moved to New Delhi where he was appointed Assistant Parish Priest at the Sacred Heart Cathedral, New Delhi. In 1965 he was admitted to Loyola University Chicago, U.S.A. to study sociology, gaining a master's degree. He also studied Development during a summer course at the Coady International Institute in Canada.

== Career ==
In 1970 Conçessao returned to Delhi and was appointed Director of Social Action of the Archdiocese of Delhi. In this role he set up the organization that is now called Chetanalaya. Through it he undertook various projects such as relief for flood victims, rehabilitating displaced persons and supporting development of the poor. He was particularly involved with helping slum-dwellers in the Delhi resettlement colonies. At the same time he was Rector of Pratiksha, the residence of seminarians studying at the Vidyajyoti College of Theology. He also served as the president of the Catholic Priests' Conference of India. In 1991 Conçessao was appointed parish priest of the Sacred Heart Cathedral, New Delhi, and in 1993 was elected Vicar General of the Archdiocese of Delhi.

Conçessao was consecrated a bishop on 1 April 1995 and was appointed auxiliary Bishop of Delhi and Bishop of titular see of Mascula. He chose the motto "To bear witness to the lord". He was appointed Archbishop of Agra on 5 November 1998. After Archbishop of Delhi Alan Basil de Lastic died Bishop Vincent was transferred back to Delhi and installed as its fifth Archbishop on 19 November 2000.

Archbishop Vincent participates in several inter-religious and multi-religious organizations. Between 2000 and 2004 he was Vice President of the Catholic Bishops' Conference of India. Other positions include President of the National United Christian Forum, President of the Federation of Asian Bishops' Conference (F.A.B.C) Office for Evangelization, President of the Regional Bishops' Conference of northern Region, Working President of the Foundation for Religious Harmony and Universal Peace and President of the Holy Family Hospital.

== Views ==
Talking shortly after the destruction of the World Trade Center in September 2001, at the General Assembly of the Synod of Bishops in the Vatican Archbishop Concessao spoke of another form of terrorism, which he called "the terrorism of an unjust economic system which grinds to death thousands of people every day".

Archbishop Vincent has been critical of the government for failing to prevent discrimination against Christians of Dalit origin based on their religion. He has said that the communal forces attacking Christians use a methodology borrowed from the Nazis, "spreading false accusations, creating an atmosphere of suspicion and hostility and then having recourse to violence to frighten the people to change their religion". When the National Integration Council was reconstituted and held an inaugural meeting in August 2005 the Christian minority rights leader John Dayal and the Reverend Valson Thampu presented a statement signed by Archbishop Vincent calling for equal rights for Christian Dalits and for an end to violence inspired by ethnic and religious divisions.

Following large-scale violent attacks on Christians in Orissa, Karnataka and other states in 2008, Concessao said the attacks were not spontaneous but had been carefully organized after years of preparation by groups interested in spreading Hindutva. He accused Chief Ministers such as Naveen Patnaik of Orissa of failing to do the minimum to protect the citizens of his state. He called for a ban on Bajrang Dal and the closely related Vishva Hindu Parishad (VHP). However, he said this seemed unlikely since he had the impression that there was collusion between the Karnataka government controlled by the Bharatiya Janata Party, the Bajrang Dal and the VHP.

Talking of the practice of Swiss banks in hiding illegal money, including that of Indians evading taxes, Concessao has said Europe "is bankrupt as regards to moral values which are so important to the Catholic Church". He proposed that Indian Catholics should help re-evangelize Europe.
