= Ivan Pereira =

Indian Catholic prelate (born 1964)

Most Reverend Ivan Pereira
- Bishop of Jammu–Srinagar
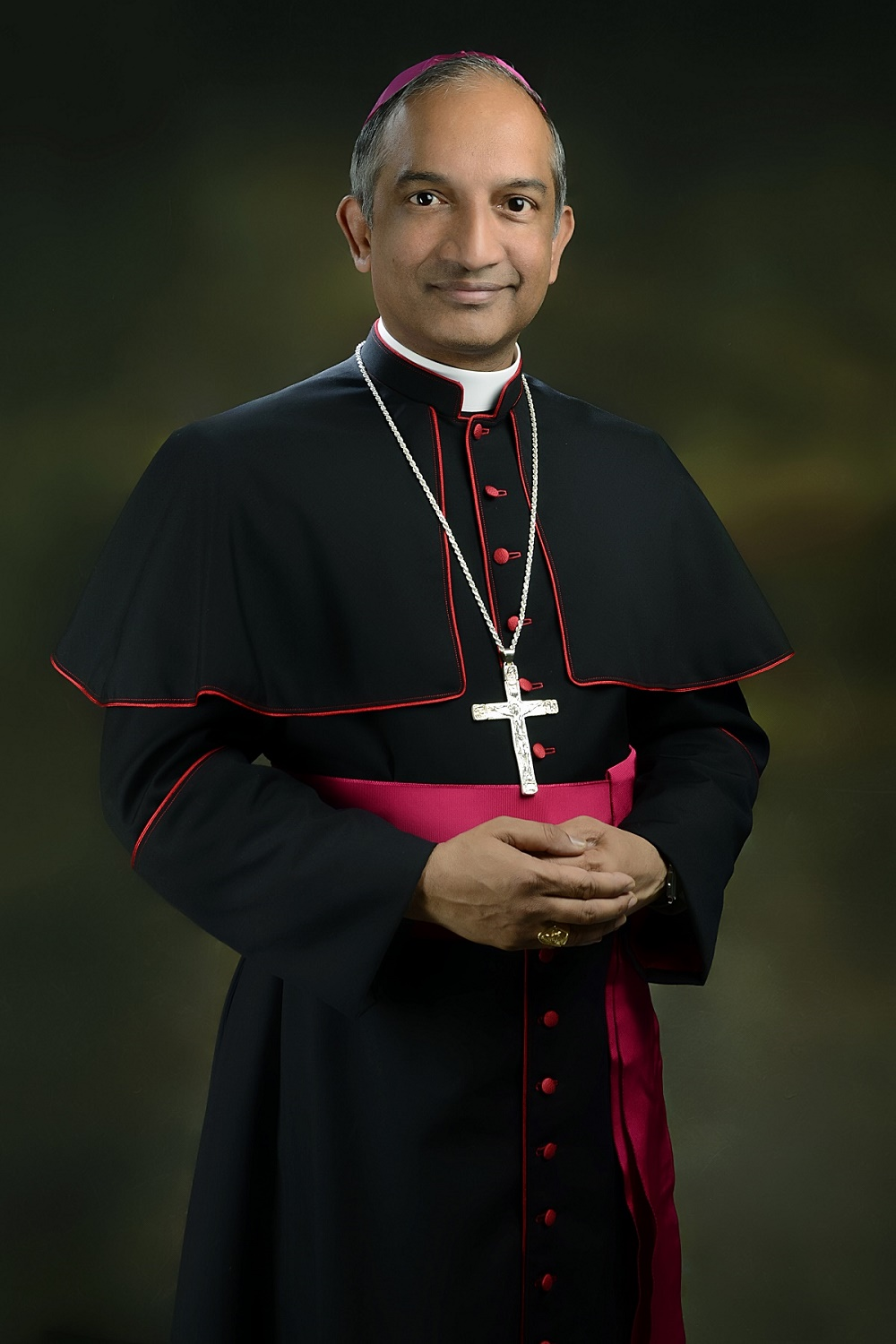
- Church: Catholic Church; Latin Church
- Diocese: Jammu–Srinagar
- Appointed: 3 December 2014
- Predecessor: Peter Celestine Elampassery
- Successor: Incumbent

Orders
- Ordination: 15 May 1993
- Consecration: 21 February 2015 by Salvatore Pennacchio

Personal details
- Born: Ivan Albert Pereira; 1 June 1964 (age 62) Vasai, Mumbai, India
- Residence: Bishop's House, Jammu Cantt 180003 Jammu and Kashmir, India
- Motto: Pax Nuntiata Est (Latin for 'Peace Is Announced')
- Coat of arms

Ivan Pereira (born 1 June 1964) is an Indian prelate of the Catholic Church serving as the third bishop of the Latin Church diocese of Jammu–Srinagar in India.

== Early life ==
Pereira was born on 1 June 1964 in Vasai, Mumbai, the son of Albert and Santan Pereira. He joined the Jammu-Srinagar diocese in 1984.

== Education ==
Pereira completed his minor seminary from St. John's Minor Seminary, Amritsar. He completed his education of philosophy from Holy Trinity Regional Seminary, Jalandhar. He completed his regency at St. Mary's Cathedral, Jammu. He completed theology from St. Joseph's Regional Seminary, Allahabad.

== Priesthood ==
Pereira was ordained a priest on 15 May 1993 for the Diocese of Jammu-Srinagar. Pereira has held a number of different positions in his diocese. He has been rector of St Paul's Minor Seminary, Akalpur, Jammu, secretary of the Regional Catholic Council, vicar, and secretary to his predecessor Peter Celestine Elampassery.

He was the parish priest of Our Lady of Fatima Church in Bishnah from 2009 to 2012. From 2012, he served as the principal of the Burn Hall Higher Secondary School in Srinagar, Jammu and Kashmir.

In addition, he was the diocesan and regional director of Indian Christian youth association, secretary and president of the Regional Conference of Diocesan Priests, North India, and the director of the diocesan education board.

== Episcopate ==
Pope Francis appointed Pereira as bishop of Jammu–Srinagar on 21 February 2015. He was consecrated a bishop by Salvatore Pennacchio with Anil Joseph Thomas Couto and Felix Anthony Machado as co-consecrators.

The consecration ceremony took place on the grounds of the Presentation Convent School in Gandhi Nagar, Jammu. He is the third bishop of Jammu–Srinagar.

On his episcopal ordination he chose the motto: Pax Nuntiata Est (Latin for 'Peace Is Announced').

Pereira succeeded Bishop Peter Celestine, who resigned soon after reaching the retirement age of 75.

Catholic Church titles
Preceded by Peter Celestine Elampassery	Bishop of Jammu-Srinagar; 2014–present	Succeeded by incumbent

== See also ==
- Catholic Church in India
- List of Catholic bishops of India

== Sources ==
- "Fr. Ivan Pereira new Bishop of Jammu-Srinagar". En.radiovaticana.va. 3 December 2014. Archived from the original on 15 February 2017.
- "Ivan Pereira takes over as 3rd Bishop of Jammu-Srinagar Diocese". Dailyexcelsior.com. 22 February 2015. Archived from the original on 31 May 2017.
- "Ivan Pereira new Bishop of Jammu-Srinagar". Tribuneindia.com. 23 February 2015. Archived from the original on 15 February 2017.
- "Bishop Ivan Pereira appointed as 3rd Bishop of J&K diocese – Early Times Newspaper Jammu Kashmir". Earlytimes.in. 22 February 1994. Archived from the original on 16 February 2017.
- "Bishop Ivan Pereira appointed as 3rd Bishop of Jammu-Srinagar Diocese". News.statetimes.in. 21 February 2015. Archived from the original on 15 February 2017.<
- "Fr. Ivan Pereira | UCAN India". Ucanindia.in. Archived from the original on 15 February 2017.
- "DDC inaugurates Burn Hall Bal Mela". Greaterkashmir.com. 17 November 2013. Archived from the original on 16 February 2017.
