= Stephen Alathara =

Indian politician

Stephen Alathara (born 1 May 1970) is the deputy secretary general of the Conference of Catholic Bishops of India (CCBI). He started as the deputy secretary general of the conference on 10 June 2014. He was appointed to this post four times consecutively in 2014, 2018, 2022 and 2026. He is the first priest from Kerala to serve as the deputy secretary general of the national episcopal conference. He is also the Director of the CCBI General Secretariat, New Delhi, CCBI Centre, Bangalore and Shanti Sadan, Goa. He is the founding Director of Communio. He is instrumental in establishing Catholic Connect, Shanti Sadan in Goa, Bethania in Fardiabad, CCBI General Secretariat in New Delhi. He played a key role in preparing the CCBI Pastoral Plan launched in 2024.

He is a priest from the Archdiocese of Verapoly, Kerala and a prolific author, columnist, educationist, theologian and visiting professor in various ecclesiastical universities. He is well known for his lectures and workshops. He is the author of 21 books as well as hundreds of articles. His book Introduction to Catechetics is the textbook for Catechetics in many major seminaries in India and abroad.

== Biography ==
Alathara was born on 1 May 1970 as the eldest son of Alathara Joseph and Joan at Moolamattom in Idukki district in the parish of St. Joseph's Church, Velliamttom of Vijayapuram diocese. He was baptized at St George Church, Moolamattomm of Palai diocese. He had his education in Govt. L.P. School Kulamavu, St. Ignatius LP School, Ponnekara, Edappally and SPWHS Aluva and St. Paul's College Kalamassery. His priestly formation began on 16 June 1985 at St. Joseph Minor Seminary, Kalamassery. After completing his priestly studies at Carmelgiri Seminary and Mangalapuzha Seminary, both in Aluva, he was ordained to the priesthood on 26 January 1995 by late Archbishop of Verapoly Most Rev. Cornelius Elenjikal.

He has obtained an MTH in Catechetics from Kristu Jyoti College, Bangalore, an MDHA in Hospital Administration and a postgraduate diploma in Business Administration. He also acquired a PhD from the Salesian Pontifical University in Rome for his dissertation 'The Role of the Teachers in the Moral and Faith Formation of the Children'. He has rendered his service to the Archdiocese of Verapoly as the Assistant Parish Priest of Holy Family Parish, Perumpilly, the vice Rector of the Minor Seminary, the Director of the Catechetical Department, Director of the Family Apostolate, General Convener of the Great Jubilee of Yesu Christhu Jayanthi, the Parish Priest of St. James Church, Cheranellur, the Director of the Kristu Jayanthi Hospital, a unit of Lourdes Hospital, He was also the director of the Public Relations Department for the archdiocese and a spokesperson of the Archdiocese of Verapoly.

He served the Catholic Church in Kerala for eight years (2007–2014) as the official spokesperson and Deputy Secretary General of the Kerala Catholic Bishops' Council (KCBC), which is the association of the bishops from three sui iuris Churches, namely Latin, Syro-Malabar and Syro-Malankara. He was the Director of the P astoral Orientation Centre (POC), which is the common pastoral animation centre of the Church in Kerala for the three individual Churches, located at Cochin, Kerala.

== See also ==
- Catholic Church in India
