= St. John's National Academy of Health Sciences =

Private medical college and hospital in Bengaluru, India

- Latin: Collegium Medicum Sancti Ioannis
- Other name: St. John's Medical College
- Motto: He Shall Live Because of Me
- Type: Private (Non-profit)
- Established: 1963; 63 years ago
- Founder: Catholic Bishops' Conference of India
- Affiliations: National Medical Commission
- Religious affiliation: Catholic
- Academic affiliations: Rajiv Gandhi University of Health Sciences
- Director: Rev. Fr. (Dr.) Jesudoss Rajamanickam
- Location: Bengaluru, Karnataka, India; 12.929298°N 77.620097°E
- Campus: Urban,148 acres
- Website: www.stjohns.in

St. John's National Academy of Health Sciences, commonly known as St. John's Medical College, is a private medical college and hospital situated in Bengaluru, India. It is founded and administered by the Catholic Bishops' Conference of India. It was established in 1963.

== History ==
The Catholic Church in India had long recognised the need to establish a medical college to complement its educational and social welfare institutions. Although the proposal was initially delayed because of its complexity, it was actively pursued by the Catholic Bishops’ Conference of India (CBCI). At the request of the CBCI, Archbishop Louis Mathias prepared reports in 1954 and 1956 outlining the project’s requirements and implementation. In September 1960, the CBCI resolved to establish a medical college with an attached teaching hospital in Bangalore. With the approval of Pope John XXIII, the institution was named St. John’s Medical College after his patron saint, St. John the Baptist, and opened in temporary premises in July 1963.

The College was designated by the Catholic Bishops of India as the principal memorial of the XXXVIII International Eucharistic Congress held in Bombay in 1964, a decision endorsed by Pope Paul VI. The Pope also established an annual scholarship in his name for the best all round student completing the MBBS programme. The project’s cornerstone was blessed by Pope Paul VI on 3 December 1964, laid at the campus site by V. V. Giri on 27 July 1965, and the completed institution was dedicated on 29 September 1968 by President Zakir Hussain. Before the permanent campus was completed, pre clinical and para clinical teaching was conducted at St. Mary’s Industrial School and Orphanage, while clinical training was provided at St. Martha’s Hospital, whose affiliation with the College continued until 1983.

In June 1968, five years after its establishment, St. John’s Medical College moved to its permanent 140 acre campus in Koramangala, Bangalore. The first phase of development included a teaching centre housing the pre clinical and para clinical departments and lecture theatres, four student hostel blocks, and residential accommodation for teaching staff. The institution was established to advance medical education, research, and healthcare while promoting service to urban and rural communities.

=== Faculties and Institutions ===
In December 1994, the Institution was renamed as St. John's National Academy of Health Sciences and it comprises the following Institutes:

- St. John's Medical College
- St. John's Hospital
- St. John's Research Institute
- St. John's College of Nursing
- St. John's Institute of Health Management and Para Medical Studies

== St John’s Medical College ==
St. John’s Medical College is a private medical college in Bengaluru, Karnataka, and a constituent institution of St. John’s National Academy of Health Sciences. Established in 1963 by the CBCI Society for Medical Education, it is affiliated with the Rajiv Gandhi University of Health Sciences and recognised by the National Medical Commission. The College offers undergraduate, postgraduate, doctoral, super-speciality, fellowship, certificate, and allied health programmes, including the MBBS, MD, MS, DM, MCh, PhD, and Bachelor of Occupational Therapy degrees.

The College comprises departments in the basic, para-clinical, medical, surgical, and super-speciality sciences. These include anatomy, physiology, biochemistry, pathology, pharmacology, microbiology, forensic medicine, community medicine, general medicine, general surgery, paediatrics, psychiatry, radiology, anaesthesiology, obstetrics and gynaecology, orthopaedics, ophthalmology, otorhinolaryngology, dermatology, and emergency medicine, alongside super-speciality departments such as cardiology, neurology, neurosurgery, nephrology, gastroenterology, endocrinology, critical care medicine, paediatric surgery, plastic surgery, surgical oncology, gynaecological oncology, and urology.

=== Partnerships ===
In 2018, St. John's Medical College partnered with Apple to conduct a needs assessment of the health and well-being of supplier employees. Based on assessment findings, Apple developed and launched a training curriculum to improve health knowledge in key areas. St. John's also provided nutrition consultation that has led to improvements at several supplier cafeterias.

== St John’s College of Nursing ==
St. John’s College of Nursing is a private nursing college in Bengaluru, Karnataka, and a constituent institution of St. John’s National Academy of Health Sciences. It was established as the St. John’s School of Nursing on 1 July 1980 by the CBCI Society for Medical Education and was upgraded to a college on 25 September 1989.

The College offers undergraduate, postgraduate, doctoral, and diploma programmes in nursing and is affiliated with the Rajiv Gandhi University of Health Sciences. Its teaching is integrated with the clinical services of St. John’s Medical College Hospital, with an emphasis on professional excellence, research, and community healthcare.

== St. John’s College of Allied Health Sciences ==
St. John’s College of Allied Health Sciences is a constituent institution of St. John’s National Academy of Health Sciences in Bengaluru, Karnataka. It offers undergraduate, postgraduate, diploma, and doctoral programmes in allied health sciences, hospital administration, physiotherapy, occupational therapy, medical laboratory technology, medical imaging technology, emergency and trauma care technology, respiratory care technology, renal dialysis technology, radiotherapy technology, perfusion technology, and anaesthesia and operation theatre technology. The College integrates classroom teaching with clinical training at St. John’s Medical College Hospital and emphasises interdisciplinary education, research, and community-based healthcare.

== St. John’s Hospital ==
St. John’s Hospital officially St. John’s Medical College Hospital is the teaching hospital of St. John’s Medical College and a constituent institution of St. John’s National Academy of Health Sciences in Bengaluru. Conceived as the principal centre for the clinical training of students in medicine, nursing, allied health sciences, and postgraduate programmes, the hospital commenced operations on 8 December 1975. It has since developed into a tertiary care teaching hospital with more than 40 broad speciality and super-speciality departments, serving as a major referral centre for Karnataka and neighbouring states.

The hospital currently has 1,800 inpatient beds, is accredited by the National Accreditation Board for Hospitals & Healthcare Providers (NABH) and the National Accreditation Board for Testing and Calibration Laboratories (NABL), and provides comprehensive diagnostic, emergency, critical care, and specialised clinical services.

In 2024, the Academy inaugurated St. John’s Medical College Hospital at Brigade Meadows, a 108-bed satellite hospital on Kanakapura Main Road in Salahunase Village, Bengaluru, established in collaboration with the Brigade Foundation to expand affordable healthcare services in south Bengaluru.

== Rankings ==
College rankings

Medical – India
- NIRF (2023): 19
- India Today (2022): 18

St John's Medical College was ranked 19th among medical colleges in India by the NIRF in 2023. St. John's Medical College was ranked 19th among medical colleges in India in 2022 by India Today.
