= All Saints Church, Srinagar =

Coordinates: 34.07229°N 74.83233°E

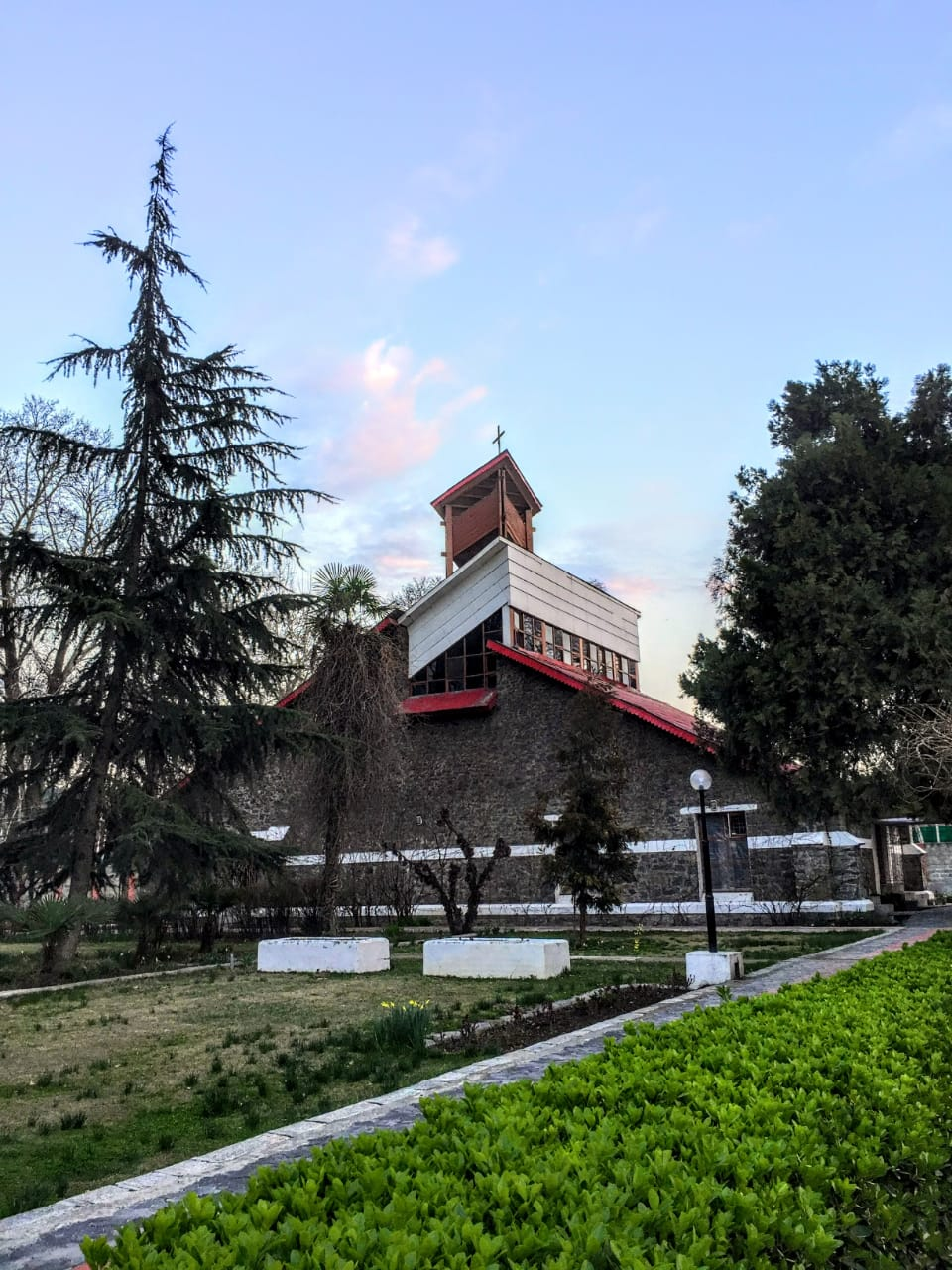
- All Saints Church, Srinagar
- Location: Srinagar
- Country: India
- Denomination: United Protestant
- Churchmanship: Church of North India

History
- Status: Church
- Dedication: All Saints

Architecture
- Functional status: Active

Specifications
- Capacity: 150-250

Administration
- Diocese: Amritsar
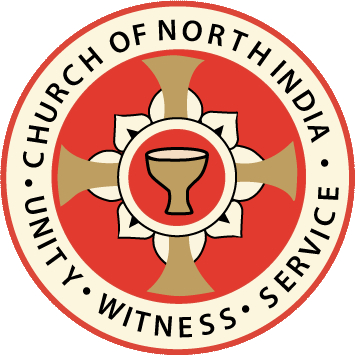

All Saints Church, also known as All Hallows Church, is a historical Protestant church built in the late 19th century in Srinagar that is part of the Church of North India, a United Protestant denomination of Christianity. All Saints Church falls within the Diocese of Amritsar and along with Holy Family Catholic Church, is one of the two Christian churches in the city. The church is dedicated to All Saints.

== History ==
All Saints church dates from the 1890s - at the time when the opening of the Jhelum Valley road, and the establishment of a British Residency in Kashmir, prompted an increasing number of Brits to come to Srinagar. It was a hill station - a place to escape the heat of the plains. And for a few hundred among the British, it became their home.

== Architecture ==
All Saints has changed hugely over the past 120 years. Only the base of the tower remains from the original construction. The church had been burnt down during protests in the 1960s and again in the 1970s. It was rebuilt using a Russian design, and making less use of wood to make it less vulnerable to fire. It was badly hit - along with so much of riverside Srinagar - in the 2014 floods. But it has recovered and is well maintained.
