= Catholic Bishops' Conference of India =

Association of the Catholic bishops of India

- Conferentia Episcoporum Catholicorum Indiae
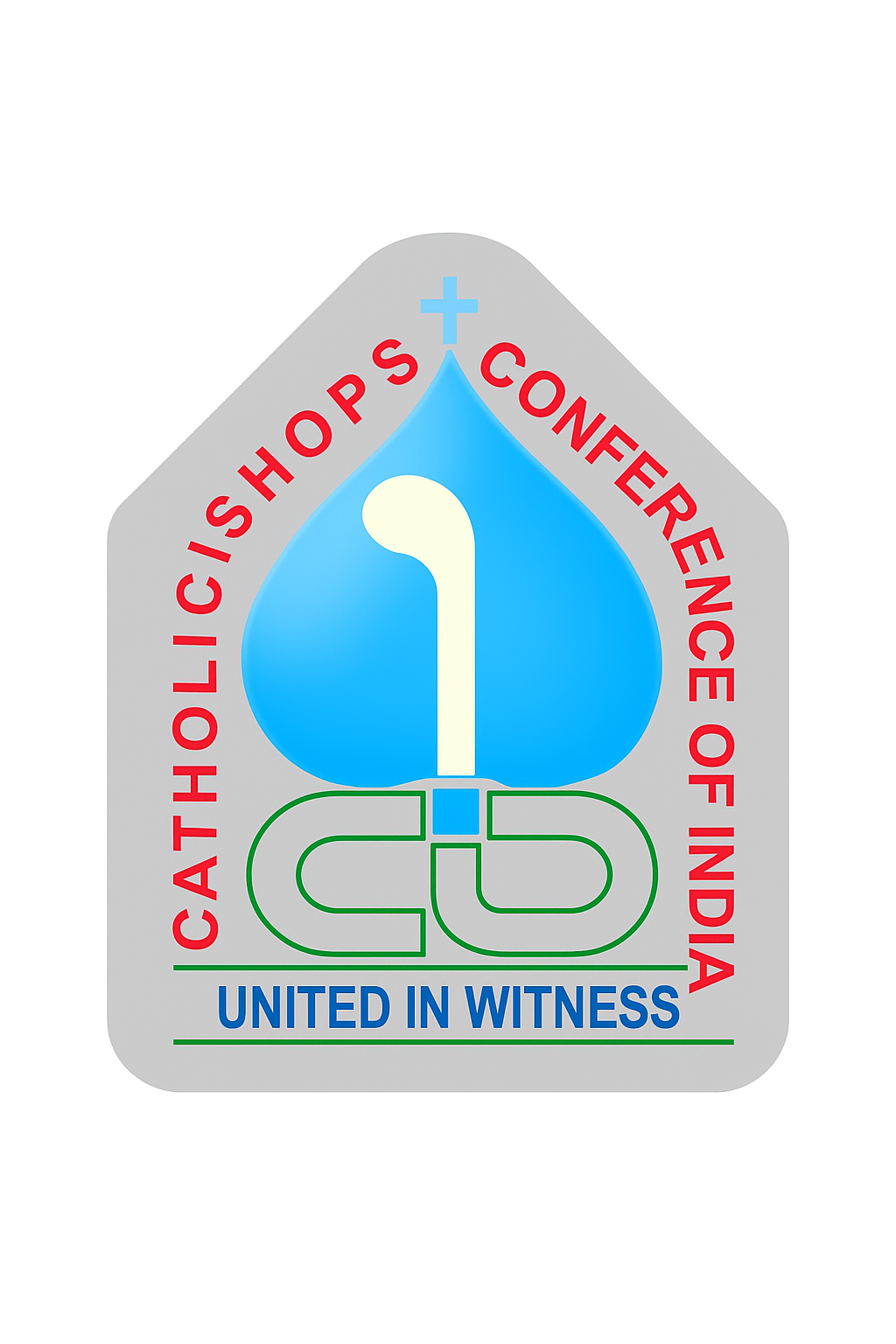
- Abbreviation: CBCI
- Formation: September 1944; 81 years ago
- Type: Permanent association of bishops
- Legal status: Civil nonprofit
- Purpose: To support the ministry of bishops
- Headquarters: New Delhi
- Region served: India
- Members: Active and retired Catholic bishops of India
- General Secretary: Anil Joseph Thomas Couto
- President: Anthony Poola
- Vice President I: Thomas Koorilos
- Vice President II: Mathew Moolakkatt
- Affiliations: Federation of Asian Bishops' Conferences
- Website: www.cbci.in

The Catholic Bishops' Conference of India (CBCI) is the permanent association of the Catholic bishops of India. It was established in September 1944, in Chennai. The CBCI Secretariat was located in Bangalore until 1962, when it was shifted to the national capital, New Delhi. The CBCI is a member of the Federation of Asian Bishops' Conferences.

== Status and relation to the episcopal bodies of the three rites ==
The CBCI is technically not an episcopal conference as prescribed in canon 447 of the 1983 Code of Canon Law; that role is fulfilled by the Conference of Catholic Bishops of India. Rather, the CBCI is similar to the 'assembly of bishops' described in 322§2 of the Code of Canons of the Eastern Churches.

Pope John Paul II in a letter in 1987 directed the Latin Church, Syro-Malabar Church, and Syro-Malankara Catholic Church to set up their own bishops' conferences. Nevertheless, the CBCI is the face of the Catholic Church in India and addresses the Church's 'questions of common concern and of a national and supra-ritual character', while the episcopal body that heads each particular church deals with internal issues.

The statutes of the CBCI were approved by the Holy See on 21 April 1976, and were revised in 1996 by the CBCI.

== Members ==
The ordinary members of the CBCI comprises all diocesan and eparchial bishops in India and those considered equal to them by canon law, as well as co-adjutor and auxiliary Bishops, and other titular Bishops performing a special work in India entrusted to them by the Apostolic See or by the Conference. Retired bishops and other titular bishops, not ordinary members of the Conference, and residing in India, are honorary members of the Conference. As of February 2014, the CBCI had around 180 members and 59 honorary members and it serves 167 dioceses.

== Objectives ==
The objectives of the CBCI are to facilitate coordinated study and discussion of questions affecting the Church, and adoption of a common policy and effective action in matters concerning the common interests of the Catholic Church in India. The CBCI reviews the position of the Church in India, and also undertakes a variety of activities covering, for example, the youth, health care and media. Another role of the CBCI is to foster the communion among the three sui juris Churches. The CBCI is the face of the Catholic Church in India promotes advocacy on national issues, makes representation to Government, liaises with the Government and networks with other Christian Churches, organizations, associations of civil society and people of other religions.

== Related episcopal bodies of India ==
The CBCI is at the service of the different episcopal conferences of three rites and the 13 regional councils of bishops.

=== Episcopal bodies of the three rites ===
- Conference of Catholic Bishops of India (CCBI) from Latin Church
- The Most Holy Episcopal Synod of Syro-Malabar Church
- The Most Holy Episcopal Synod from Syro-Malankara Catholic Church

=== Regional bishops' councils ===
1. The Agra Regional Bishops' Council (ARBC) consists of the Bishops of the ecclesiastical province of Agra and dioceses of the Oriental Rites in Uttar Pradesh, Uttaranchal and Rajasthan.
2. The Andhra Pradesh Bishops' Council (APBC) comprises all the Bishops of the ecclesiastical provinces of Hyderabad and Visakhapatnam and dioceses of Oriental Rites in Andhra Pradesh.
3. The Bengal Regional Bishops' Council (BRBC) consists of the Bishops of the ecclesiastical province of Calcutta.
4. The BIJHAN Regional Bishops' Council (BRBC) consists of the Bishops of the ecclesiastical provinces of Ranchi and Patna.
5. The Council of Bishops of Chhattisgarh (CBCG) consists of the Bishops of the ecclesiastical province of Raipur and diocese of Oriental Rite in Chhattisgarh.
6. The Karnataka Regional Catholic Bishops' Council (KRCBC) comprises all the Bishops of the ecclesiastical province of Bangalore and dioceses of Oriental Rites in Karnataka.
7. The Kerala Catholic Bishops' Council (KCBC) comprises all the Bishops of the ecclesiastical provinces of Trivandrum, Verapoly (Latin Rite), Changanacherry, Ernakulam-Angamaly, Kottayam, Trichur, Tellicherry (Syro-Malabar Rite) & Tiruvalla, Trivandrum (Syro-Malankara Rite).
8. The Council of Bishops of Madhya Pradesh (CBMP) consists of the Bishops of the ecclesiastical province of Bhopal and dioceses of Oriental Rites in Madhya Pradesh.
9. The Regional Bishops' Council of the North consists of the Bishops of the ecclesiastical province of Delhi.
10. The North Eastern Regional Council consists of the Bishops of the ecclesiastical provinces of Shillong, Guwahati and Imphal.
11. The Orissa Bishops' Regional Council (OBRC) consists of the Bishops of the ecclesiastical province of Cuttack-Bhubaneshwar.
12. The Tamil Nadu Bishops' Council (TNBC) comprises all the Bishops of ecclesiastical provinces of Madras-Mylapore, Madurai, Pondicherry-Cuddalore and dioceses of the Oriental Rites in Tamil Nadu.
13. The Western Regional Bishops' Council comprises all the Bishops of the ecclesiastical provinces of Bombay, Nagpur, Goa and Daman, Gandhinagar and dioceses of Oriental Rites in the Western Region.

== Presidents ==
- Valerian Gracias (1958–1972)
- Mar Joseph Parecattil (1972–1976)
- Lawrence Picachy, S.J. (1976–1982)
- Simon Pimenta (1982–1988)
- Aboon Mor Benedict Gregorios, O.I.C. (1988–1989)
- Alphonsus Mathias (1989–1994)
- Joseph Powathil (1994–1998)
- Alan Basil de Lastic (1998 – 20 June 2000)
- Moran Mor Cyril Baselios, O.I.C. (2000–2004)
- Telesphore Toppo (12 January 2004 – 19 February 2008)
- Mar Varkey Vithayathil, C.Ss.R. (19 February 2008 – 3 March 2010)
- Oswald Gracias (4 March 2010 – 10 February 2014)
- Moran Mor Baselios Cleemis (11 February 2014 - 9 February 2018)
- Oswald Gracias (9 February 2018 – 10 November 2022)
- Andrews Thazhath (10 November 2022 – February 2026)
- Anthony Cardinal Poola (Incumbent)

== National centres ==
- Caritas India
- St. John's National Academy of Health Sciences
- National Biblical, Catechetical and Liturgical Centre
- National Vocation Service Centre
- National Institute of Social Communications, Research and Training
- CBCI Society for Medical Education, North India

== See also ==
- Catholic Church in India
- List of Catholic bishops of India
