= Alan Basil de Lastic =

Roman Catholic archbishop (1929–2000)

- Archbishop of Delhi
- Church: Catholic Church
- Archdiocese: Archdiocese of Delhi
- In office: 19 November 1990 – 20 June 2000
- Predecessor: Angelo Innocent Fernandes
- Successor: Vincent Conçessao
- Other post: President of the Catholic Bishops' Conference of India (1998-2000)
- Previous posts: Bishop of Lucknow (1984-1990); Titular Bishop of Cissa (1979-1984); Auxiliary Bishop of Calcutta (1979-1984)

Orders
- Ordination: 21 December 1958
- Consecration: 27 May 1979 by Pope John Paul II

Personal details
- Born: 24 September 1929 Maymyo, Mandalay Division, Burma, British Raj, British Empire
- Died: 20 June 2000 (aged 70) Poland

Alan Basil de Lastic (24 September 1929 – 20 June 2000) was a prominent Catholic (Latin Rite) clergyman in India who was installed as the fourth Archbishop of Delhi in November 1990.

== Birth and education ==
Alan de Lastic was born in Maymyo, Burma on 24 September 1929. He was of mixed Burmese, Irish and French ancestry, with his grandparents on his father's side coming from Bourg-Lastic in France, but he always considered himself wholly Indian. In 1942 his family escaped from Rangoon when the Japanese army entered Burma during the World War II. de Lastic completed his secondary education in Patna, then moved to Calcutta where he spent five years studying marine engineering. He worked in the Calcutta shipyards before being called to the priesthood.

de Lastic began his ecclesiastical studies in 1951. He was ordained on 21 December 1958 as a priest in Calcutta. He went to Rome, where he completed his doctorate in dogmatic theology, and then spent a year at University College Dublin in Ireland, returning to India in the early 1960s.

== Clerical career ==
de Lastic rose quickly in the hierarchy of the Catholic Church of India. On 9 April 1979 he was appointed Auxiliary Bishop of Calcutta, and on 9 April 1979 was appointed Titular Bishop of Cissa. Mother Teresa was present at the ceremony in the Vatican when Pope John Paul II consecrated Alan as a Bishop on 27 May 1979. On 2 July 1984 he was appointed Bishop of Lucknow, and on 19 November 1990 he was appointed Archbishop of Delhi. He assumed office as archbishop on 27 January 1991. In 1998 he was appointed President of the Catholic Bishops' Conference of India.

Alan de Lastic died on 20 June 2000 in a car crash in Poland. His funeral was held on 27 June 2000 in Delhi and was attended by about 15,000 people, far more than anticipated. In addition to over 70 bishops, 400 priests and hundreds of nuns the funeral was attended by representatives of Bahais, Buddhists, Hindus, Jains, Jews, Muslims, Sikhs and Zoroastrians. President of India K. R. Narayanan, Congress Party leader Sonia Gandhi and several federal ministers paid their respects.

== Achievements and recognition ==
de Lastic founded and became president of the United Christians Forum for Human Rights, an interdenominational group. He was appointed a member of the National Integration Council of the Government of India. By the late 1990s, Archbishop Alan de Lastic, John Dayal and a few other clergy and lay leaders had become the voices of the Indian Christian Community. As the elected leader of the Catholic Bishops, in turn leaders of the 16 million Catholics in India out of 22 million Christians, the Archbishop energetically fulfilled his duty to act as a spokesman defending the Christian community when it came under attack.

In an interview shortly before his death he said "Today I feel ashamed to be an Indian ... when I see what is happening to the Christian community I worry about India's future... There's an all-round attempt to intimidate the Christian community and hamper the work they're doing to uplift the poor, particularly in tribal areas... [this is] the gravest challenge facing the community since independence". However, in the same interview he said "India has a great tradition of religious tolerance ... I will never accept that Hindus are attacking Christians. It is a few fanatics who are giving India a bad name. They should realise that they end up giving their own religion a bad name in the entire world".
