= Angelo Innocent Fernandes =

His Excellency Angelo Innocent Fernandes
- Archbishop of New Delhi
- Church: Sacred Heart Cathedral
- Archdiocese: New Delhi
- Province: Delhi State
- Metropolis: New Delhi
- See: New Delhi
- Appointed: 16 September 1967
- Term ended: 27 January 1991
- Predecessor: Archbishop Joseph Fernandes
- Successor: Archbishop Alan Basil de Lastic

Orders
- Ordination: 29 August 1937 by Bishop Nicolas Laudadio S.J.
- Consecration: 1 November 1959 by Valerian Cardinal Gracias, Archbishop j. Fernandes, Archbishop V. Dyer

Personal details
- Born: Angelo Innocent Fernandes; 28 July 1913 Karachi
- Died: 30 January 2000 (aged 86) New Delhi
- Buried: Interred in crypt in Sacred Heart Cathedral
- Denomination: Roman Catholic
- Residence: Archbishop's House, New Delhi
- Parents: John Ligorio and Evelyn Sabina-Fernandes
- Education: STL, DD
- Motto: In Aedificationem Corporis Christi
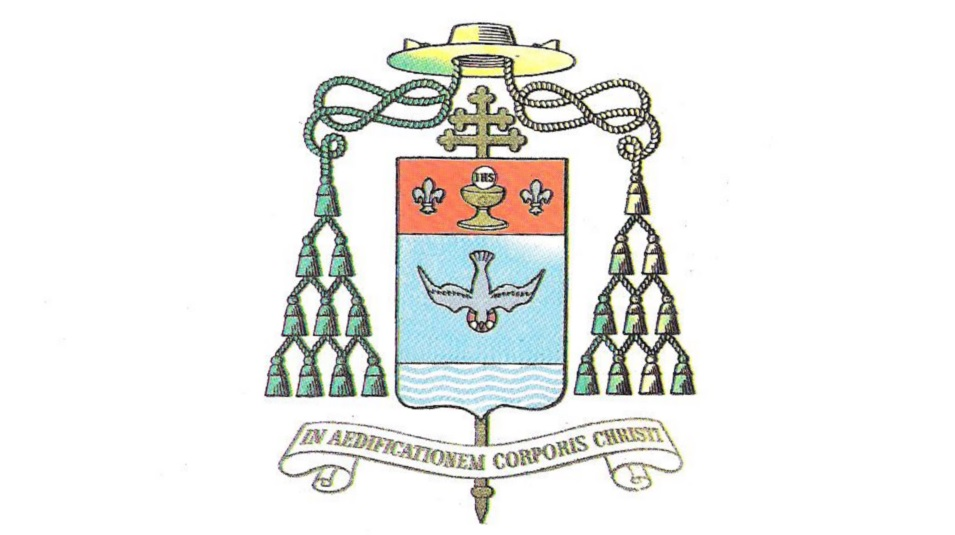
- Coat of arms

Angelo Innocent Fernandes (1913–2000) was the Roman Catholic Archbishop of Delhi from 1967 to 1990. He was born in Karachi on 28 July 1913, trained for the priesthood, and was ordained in 1937 in Bombay (Mumbai) where he became Rector of the Cathedral. In 1960 he was appointed Secretary General of the Catholic Bishops Conference of India, and later served on two Vatican Council commissions under Pope John XXIII. He was a founding member of the World Conference on Religion and Peace.

== Biography ==
Fernandes was born into a devout Catholic family of the late John Ligorio and Evelyn Sabina Fernandes in Karachi, Pakistan (then part of India). He attended school there at St. Patrick’s High School and continued to St. Joseph’s Seminary, Mangalore to prepare for his priestly studies. He graduated from the famed Papal University, Kandy, Sri Lanka (Ceylon) and was ordained on 29 August 1937 in the Archdiocese of Bombay.

Before his transfer to New Delhi (Capital of India) as Coadjutor Archbishop he was Rector of the Cathedral of the Holy Name, Bombay having served as Secretary to Archbishop Roberts and also the late Valerian Cardinal Gracias as his secretary. He was consecrated by His Eminence Valerian Cardinal Gracias on 1 November 1959 on the very grounds where his funeral mass was held. He was Secretary General of the Catholic Bishops Conference of India (1960–1972). Initially he was engaged in pastoral work in Bombay including the fields of education and social service. From 1966–1976 he was appointed Consultor and later member of the Pontifical Academy "Justice and Peace" concerned actively with world cooperation for development at all levels and furtherance of world peace. He was also a member of the Secretariate of the World Synod of Bishops (1971–1974).

Nominated in 1963 by Pope John XXIII to be a member of the Vatican Council Commission "De Episcopis et Diocesium Regimine". In 1964 Co-opted as member of the Commission "Pro Ecclesia in mundo hujus temporis" Archbishop Fernandes had important links with the Government of India and was considered as an important and eminent invitee for various State Functions. For the Gandhi Centenary Year he was a member of the National Intergarion Committee. In many respects he was Gandhi-like in both attitude and lifestyle.

== International scope of work ==
Fernandes lectured on religion and philosophy and on educational and cultural matters to all types of audiences in India, the Far East, Australia, New Zealand, Ireland, Great Britain, Belgium, Netherlands, Switzerland, Germany, Denmark, Italy and all parts of the United States. His radio talks have been largely on All India Radio, Radio Vaticana, National Broadcasting Corporation-New York, Radio Eirenean, BBC, Radio Koln and KRO-the Netherlands.

He undertook a World Tour under the auspices of the Christian Family Movement in connection with Ecumenical Meetings on Development, Justice and Peace. He paid an official visit to Russia as leader of the Vatican delegation to the Russian Orthodox Church. In connection with multi-religious work in the fields of human rights, development, disarmament, environment he travelled to Turkey, Scotland, England, Finland, the United States, Japan, Singapore, Bangladesh, Malaysia, Hong Kong, Thailand, Philippines, Indonesia, Pakistan, various European countries and Canada. He also visited Sri Lanka, Burma, Iran, Aden, Mauritius, Israel, Portugal, Spain, France, Poland, Sweden, East Germany.

=== World Conference on Religion and Peace ===
Archbishop Fernandes was a founding member and the first president (1970–84) of the World Conference on Religion and Peace (WCRP), an international organization of representatives of the world's major religious traditions who meet to study and act upon global problems affecting peace, justice, and human survival (disarmament). Fernandes attended the world conferences in Kyoto, 1970; Louvain, 1974; Princeton, 1979; Nairobi, 1984; and Melbourne, 1989 as well as numerous regional assemblies.

== Publications ==
- 1. "Humanization-A Process of Love": St. Paul Publications, Allahabad
- 2. "The Role of Religious in the Mystical Body": CRI-Women, Calcutta
- 3. "The Role of Religion in a Technological; World": St. Paul, Allahabad
- 4. "Renewal & Adaptation of Religious Life": CRU-Calcutta
- 5. "The Role of the Family in a Changing World": Nirmala Press, Ernakulam
- 6. "The Role of Good People in Society": St. Paul Publications, Allahabad
- 7. "Religion and Peace": St. Paul Publications, Allahabad
- 8. "Religion and the Quality of Life": Sanjivan Publication Assoc., New Delhi
- 9. "Religion and a New World Order": Sanjivan Publication Assoc., New Delhi
- 10. "Apostolic Endeavour": St. Paul Publications, Allahabad
- 11. "Towards Peace and Justice"-1981
- 12. "God’s Rule and Man’s Role"-1982
- 13. "Summons to Dialogue"-1983
- 14. "The Christian Way Today"-1987
- 15. "As You Pray So You Live"-1992
- 16. "Building Bridges-The Missing Dimension in Education"-1993
- 17. "Experience in Dialogue"-1994
- 18. "Vatican Two Revisited"-1996

== Personal life ==
Archbishop Fernandes’ mother tongue was English, but he also spoke Konkani, Latin, Hindi, Italian and a smattering of French. Besides reading and writing, he was interested in classical music, particularly the violin, and he took a keen interest in sports, but actively in swimming.

Fernandes had a younger brother Stanislaus (deceased 2004) and an older brother Emil (deceased 1994). They are survived by Emil’s sons - Melvyn, Robin, Geoffrey, Kevin and Dana, all of whom reside in Canada (Toronto and environs).
