= Hippolytus Anthony Kunnunkal =

Indian prelate of the Catholic Church (1921–2008)

Most Reverend Hippolytus Anthony Kunnunkal OFM, Cap
- Bishop Emeritus of Jammu-Srinagar
- Native name: ഹിപ്പോളിറ്റസ് ആന്റണി കുന്നങ്കൽ
- Church: Catholic Church
- Diocese: Jammu–Srinagar
- Appointed: 10 Mar 1986
- Installed: 29 Jun 1986
- Term ended: 3 Apr 1998
- Predecessor: Position established
- Successor: Peter Celestine Elampassery

Orders
- Ordination: 11 April 1951
- Consecration: 29 June 1986 by Cardinal Jozef Tomko

Personal details
- Born: Hippolytus Anthony Kunnunkal; 14 March 1921 Alappuzha, Kerala, India
- Died: 9 August 2008 (aged 87) Kerala, India
- Buried: Kerala, India

Hippolytus Anthony Kunnunkal, OFM, Cap was an Indian prelate of the Catholic Church. He was the first apostolic prefect and first bishop of the Catholic Diocese of Jammu-Srinagar.

== Early life ==
Kunnunkal was born on 14 March 1921 in the city of Alappuzha in the state of Kerala, India.

== Priesthood ==
Kunnunkal was ordained a Priest on 11 April 1951. He was a missionary priest belonging to Order of Friars Minor Capuchin.

== Prefecture ==
Kunnunkal was appointed Prefect Apostolic of Jammu and Kashmir on 11 November 1978.

== Episcopate ==
Kunnunkal was consecrated Bishop of Roman Catholic Diocese of Jammu–Srinagar on 29 June 1986. While bishop of Jammu Sringar, he started an initiative to translate the Bible into Kashmiri, which would be completed in 2011, after his death. He died on 9 August 2008.

Catholic Church titles
Preceded by Jammu-Srinagar Diocese Created	Bishop of Jammu-Srinagar; 1986 - 1998	Succeeded by Peter Celestine Elampassery
