= Pomburpa =

- Village
- Location in Goa, India Pomburpa (India)
- Coordinates: 15°33′0″N 73°51′0″E
- Country: India
- State: Goa
- District: North Goa
- Elevation: 68 m (223 ft)

Languages
  - Official: Konkani
- Time zone: UTC+5:30 (IST)
- Vehicle registration: GA
- Coastline: 0 kilometres (0 mi)
- Website: goa.gov.in

Pomburpa is a village in North Goa, India.

== Geography ==
It is located at 15°33′0″N 73°51′0″E at an elevation of 68 m above MSL.

== Places of interest ==
- Our Lady of Socorro Church
- Church of Our Lady of Miracles
- Pomburpa Spring
