= Apostolic Prefecture of Kafiristan and Kashmir =

Former Roman Catholic archdiocese in Pakistan

The Prefecture Apostolic of Kafiristan and Kashmir (Latin: Praefectura Apostolica de Kafiristania et Caspira) was a Roman Catholic missionary division. It was under the Diocese of Lahore.
