= Anil Joseph Thomas Couto =

Indian Latin Catholic archbishop (born 1954)

The Most Reverend Anil Joseph Thomas Couto
- Archbishop of Delhi
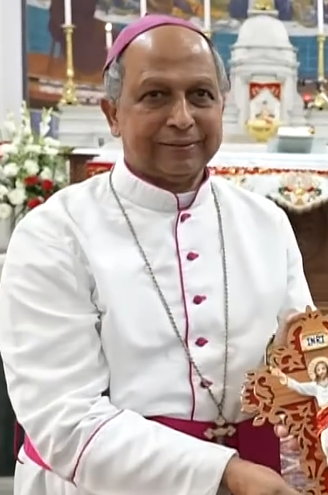
- Archdiocese: Archdiocese of Delhi
- See: Delhi
- Appointed: 2 December 2012
- Installed: 20 January 2013
- Predecessor: Vincent M. Concessao
- Other posts: Chairman of the CBCI Office for Clergy and Religious Dialogue
- Previous post: Bishop of Jalandhar

Orders
- Ordination: 8 February 1981
- Consecration: 11 March 2001 by Vincent Michael Concessao

Personal details
- Born: 22 September 1954 (age 72) Pomburpa, Goa, Portuguese India
- Residence: Archbishop's House 1 Ashok Place, New Delhi - 110 001
- Education: Pontifical University of Saint Thomas Aquinas
- Motto: English - "That They May All Be One"; Hindi - "Sab Ke Sab, Ek Ho Jaye"; Punjabi - "SARIYANTE SARE EK HO JAAN"

Styles of Anil Joseph Thomas Couto
- Reference style: The Most Reverend
- Spoken style: Your Excellency
- Religious style: Monsignor

Anil Joseph Thomas Couto is the serving archbishop of the Archdiocese of Delhi.

== Early life ==
He was born on 22 September 1954 in Pomburpa, Goa, to Mr. Avito Piedade Jose Couto and Mrs. Ernestina Isabel Lobo e Couto. Joseph Coutts, Archbishop of Karachi and cardinal, is his first cousin.

== Education ==
Anil received his primary education at a Government Primary School and thereafter at St. Elizabeth's High School at Pomburpa, Goa. He did his ecclesiastical studies at the Seminary of Our Lady at Saligao and his philosophical studies at the Patriarchal Seminary at Rachol in Goa. Completed Master of Theology Degree in Ecumenism at Vidyajyoti and acquired his Doctorate in Ecumenical Theology at St. Thomas Aquinas Pontifical University (Angelicum), Rome.

== Religious journey ==
He was ordained a priest for Roman Catholic Archdiocese of Delhi on 8 February 1981. Appointed Auxiliary Bishop of Delhi on 17 January 2001, he was ordained bishop on 11 March 2001. He was appointed Episcopal Vicar by late Archbishop Alan de Lastic 1999 and appointed Auxiliary Bishop of Delhi & Titular Bishop of Cenculiana on 17 January 2001. His Episcopal Ordination was held on 11 March 2001. He was transferred as Bishop of Jalandhar on 24 February 2007 and he took charge of it on 15 April 2007. He also served as the Rector of the Delhi Archdiocesan Minor Seminary, "Vinay Gurukul", in Gurgaon. In 1991 he was appointed the Rector of 'Pratiksha', Major Seminary, in Delhi.

== Archbishop ==
He was appointed the Archbishop of Delhi on 2 December 2012, replacing Archbishop Vincent Concessao, who passed the canonical retirement age of 75 the previous year.

He also serves as the ecumenism chairman of the Conference of the Catholic Bishops' of India. He is a member of the Commission for Inter Religious Dialogue of the Catholic Bishops' Conference of India (CBCI).

== Controversial political comments ==
Anil Couto, in a letter written to all parish priests and religious institutions in the Delhi archdiocese, has claimed that a "turbulent political atmosphere" in the country posed a threat to India's constitutional principles and secular fabric. Reacting to the development, Government Minister Giriraj Singh said in a tweet, "The church receives an order from Italy whereas pseudo-seculars get their support from Pakistan. The day will soon come when the Hindus understand this and smash both to save India".

== See also ==
- List of Catholic bishops of India

Catholic Church titles
Preceded by Vincent M. Concessao	Archbishop of Delhi; 2012 - present	Succeeded by incumbent
