= Archdiocese of Delhi =

Latin Catholic archdiocese in Delhi and Haryana, India

Coordinates: 28.6285°N 77.2067°E

Archdiocese of Delhi Archidioecesis Delhiensis दिल्ली के सूबा

Location
- Country: India
- Territory: New Delhi
- Ecclesiastical province: Delhi

Statistics
- Area: 15,420 km^{2} (5,950 sq mi)
- Population: Total; Catholics: (as of 2013); 26,469,385; 112,348 (0.4%)
- Parishes: 84

Information
- Denomination: Catholic Church
- Sui iuris church: Latin Church
- Rite: Roman Rite
- Established: 13 April 1937; 89 years ago
- Cathedral: Sacred Heart Cathedral, New Delhi
- Patron saint: Sacred Heart of Jesus
- Secular priests: 259

Current leadership
- Pope: Leo XIV
- Metropolitan Archbishop: Anil Joseph Thomas Couto
- Auxiliary Bishops: Deepak Valerian Tauro
- Bishops emeritus: Vincent Concessao

Map
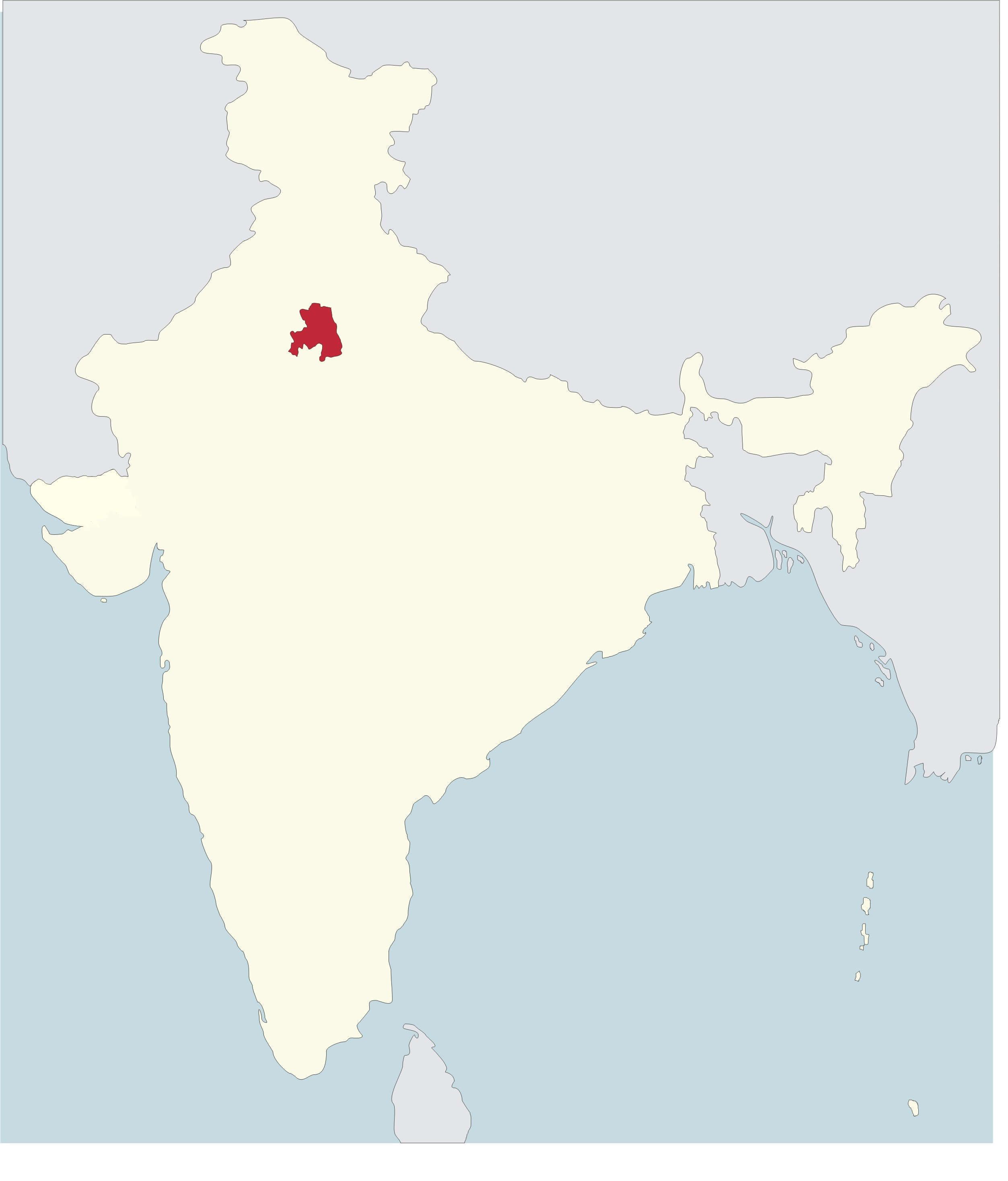

Website
- Website of the Archdiocese

The Latin Catholic Archdiocese of Delhi (Latin: Delhien(sis)) is a Latin Church Metropolitan archdiocese of the Catholic Church in northern India.

Its cathedral archiepiscopal see is Sacred Heart Cathedral, in the national capital city of New Delhi.

== History ==
- 13 September 1910: established as Metropolitan Archdiocese of Simla, on territory split off from the Metropolitan Archdiocese of Agra and Diocese of Lahore
- 13 April 1937: renamed as Metropolitan Archdiocese of Delhi and Simla
- 4 June 1959: renamed as Metropolitan Archdiocese of Delhi, having lost territory to establish as suffragan the new Diocese of Simla
- Pope John Paul II made two papal visits, in February 1986 and November 1999.

== Statistics ==
As of 2014, the diocese served 115,300 Catholics (0.4% of the total population of 26,810,000) in 15,420 square kilometres (5,950 sq mi), with 60 parishes and 4 missions. Personnel consisted of 301 priests (130 diocesan, 171 religious), 1,006 religious (391 brothers, 615 sisters) and 25 seminarians.

== Ordinaries ==
(all Latin Church)

Metropolitan Archbishops of Simla

- Archbishop Anselm Edward John Kenealy, OFMCap (21 December 1910 – 13 January 1936 see below)
  - Apostolic Administrator Archbishop Anselm Edward John Kenealy, OOFMCap (see above 13 January 1936 – 13 April 1937), when retired as Titular Archbishop of Ratiaria (13 January 1936 – death 8 December 1943)

Metropolitan Archbishops of Delhi and Simla

- Silvestro Patrizio Mulligan, OFMCap (13 April 1937 – death 16 August 1950), Titular Archbishop emeritus of Cyrrhus (1950.08.16 – 1950.10.23)
  - Apostolic Administrator Father John Burke (1950 – 12 April 1951) (later Bishop)
- Joseph Alexander Fernandes (12 April 1951 – 4 June 1959)

Metropolitan Archbishops of Delhi

- Joseph Alexander Fernandes (4 June 1959 – 16 September 1967)
- Angelo Innocent Fernandes (16 September 1967 – 19 November 1990)
- Alan Basil de Lastic (19 November 1990 – 20 June 2000)
- Vincent Michael Conçessao (7 September 2000 – 30 November 2012)
  - Auxiliary Bishop: Franco Mulakkal (17 January 2009 – 13 June 2013)
- Anil Joseph Thomas Couto (30 November 2012 – ...)

== Ecclesiastical province ==
Delhi's ecclesiastical province comprises the Metropolitan's own archdiocese and the following suffragan dioceses:

- Roman Catholic Diocese of Jammu–Srinagar
- Roman Catholic Diocese of Jalandhar
- Roman Catholic Diocese of Simla and Chandigarh

== Sources and external links ==
- GCatholic.org
- Catholic Hierarchy
- Archdiocese website

== See also ==
- List of Roman Catholic dioceses in India
