= Christianity in Madhya Pradesh =

Christianity is a minority religion in Madhya Pradesh, a state of India. Hindus form the majority in the state. There are many Pentecostal denominations such as Assemblies of God in India, India Pentecostal Church of God are present in the state. The Dioceses of Bhopal and of Jabalpur of the Church of North India have their seats in Madhya Pradesh. The Roman Catholic Archdiocese of Bhopal, the Roman Catholic Diocese of Gwalior, the Roman Catholic Diocese of Indore, the Roman Catholic Diocese of Jabalpur, the Roman Catholic Diocese of Jhabua, the Roman Catholic Diocese of Khandwa, the Syro-Malabar Catholic Diocese of Sagar the Syro-Malabar Catholic Diocese of Satna and the Syro-Malabar Catholic Diocese of Ujjain have their seat in the state. The Presbyterian Free Church, which is a member of the International Conference of Reformed Churches has its seat in the state. Jabalpur has Christ Church Boys Senior Secondary School.

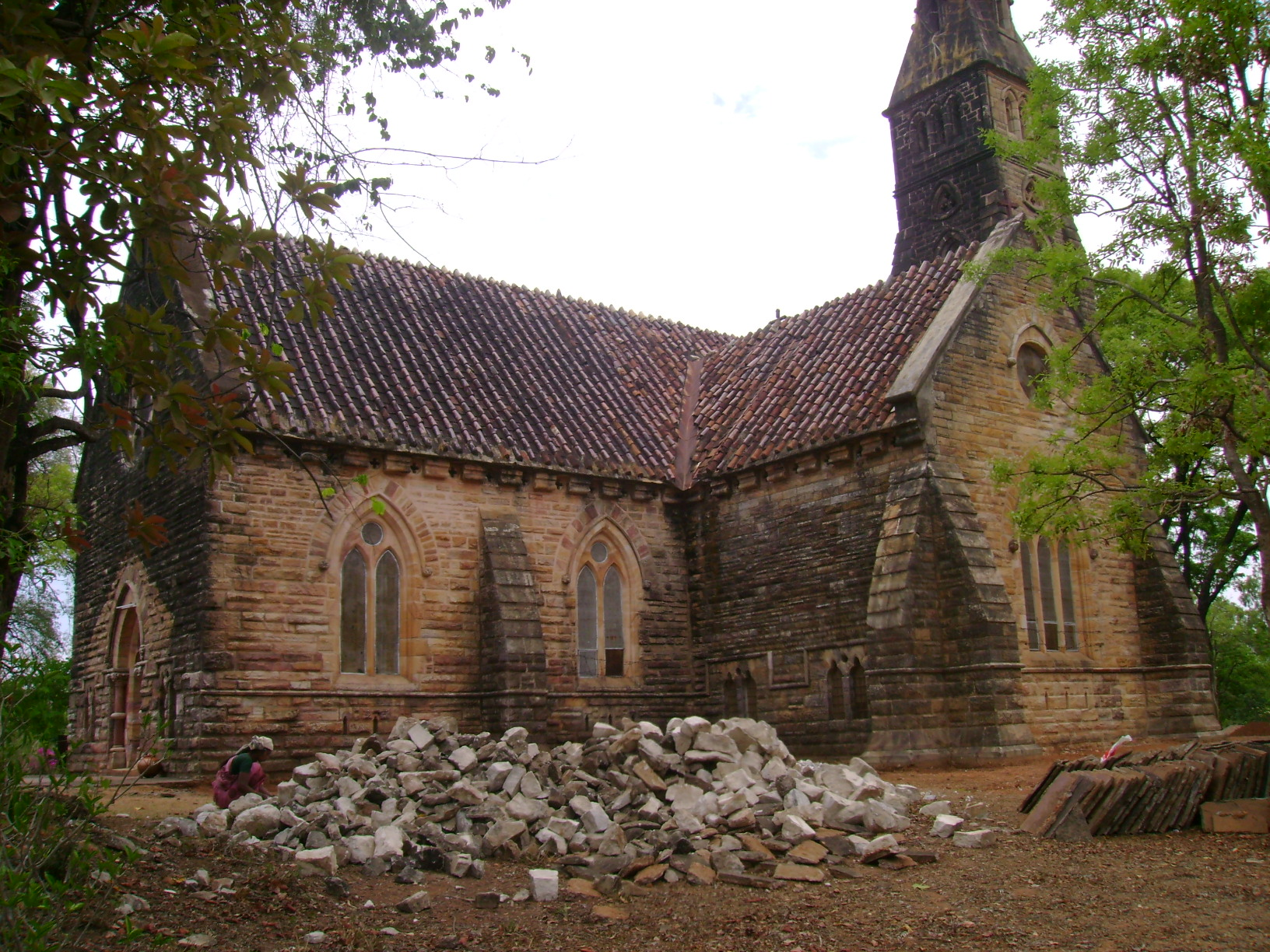
The Catholic church, Pachmarhi

Christians in Madhya Pradesh
Year	Number	Percentage
2001	170,381	0.28
2011	213,282	0.29

== List of denominations ==
- Fellowship of Pentecostal Churches of God, India
- Mid-India Yearly Meeting (of Friends)
- Evangelical Lutheran Church in Madhya Pradesh, being part of the United Evangelical Lutheran Church in India
- Indian Evangelical Team
