= Edwin Colaço =

Indian Roman Catholic prelate (1937–2025)

His Excellency Edwin Colaço
- Bishop Emeritus of Aurangabad
- Archdiocese: Nagpur
- Diocese: Aurangabad
- Appointed: 20 October 2006
- Term ended: 13 May 2015
- Predecessor: Sylvester Monteiro
- Successor: Ambrose Rebello
- Previous post: Bishop of Amravati (1995–2006)

Orders
- Ordination: 2 December 1964
- Consecration: 30 July 1995 by Simon Pimenta, Leobard D’Souza and Joseph Albert Rosario

Personal details
- Born: 2 October 1937 Uttan, Bombay Province, British India
- Died: 22 September 2025 (aged 87)
- Motto: In the service of the Gospel

Edwin Colaço (2 October 1937 – 22 September 2025) was an Indian Roman Catholic prelate. He was bishop of Amravati from 1995 to 2006 and Aurangabad from 2006 to 2015. Colaço died on 22 September 2025, at the age of 87.

Catholic Church titles
Preceded by Sylvester Monteiro	Bishop of Aurangabad; 2006–2015	Succeeded by Ambrose Rebello
Preceded by Joseph Albert Rosario	Bishop of Amravati; 1995–2006	Succeeded by Lourdunada Daniel
