= Malcolm Sequeira =

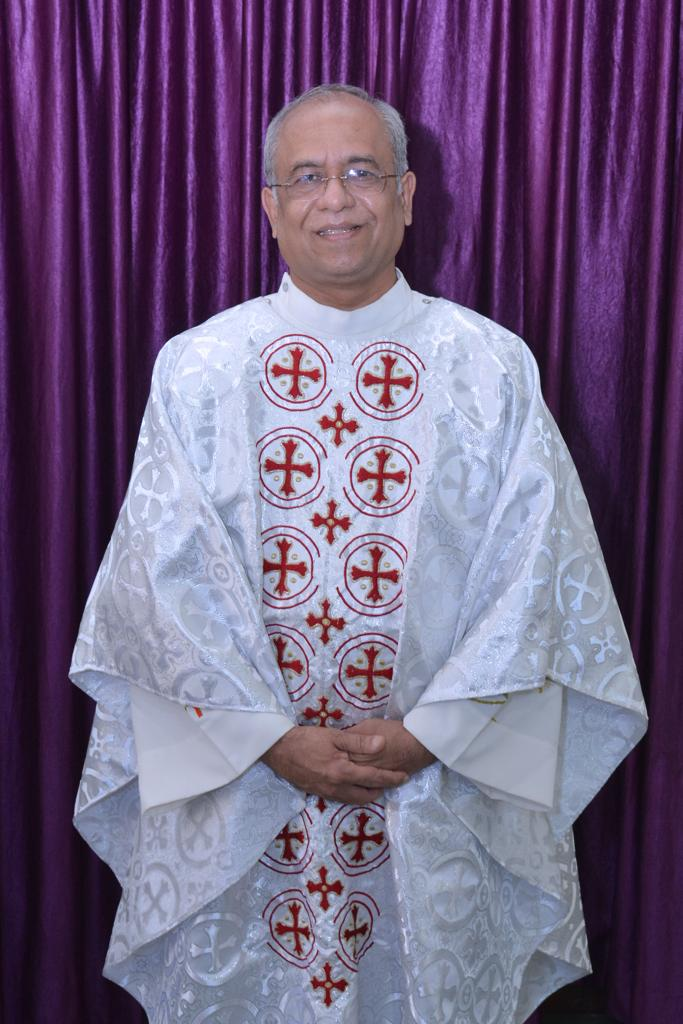
- Province: Roman Catholic Archdiocese of Nagpur
- Diocese: Roman Catholic Diocese of Amravati
- See: Amravati
- Elected: 30 November 2023
- Predecessor: Elias Gonsalves
- Successor: incumbent

Orders
- Ordination: 13 April 1996
- Consecration: 25 January 2024 by Oswald Cardinal Gracias

Personal details
- Born: November 4, 1961 Giriz, Vasai, India
- Motto: Shepherd after God's own heart परमेश्वराच्या हृदयासम मेंढपाल

Malcolm Sequeira (born November 4, 1961, in Giriz, Vasai, Maharashtra) is the bishop of the Amravati in India.

== Life ==
Malcolm Sequeira studied philosophy and theology at St. Pius X College in Goregaon, Mumbai. On April 13, 1996, he received the sacrament of ordination and was incardinated in the Diocese of Poona.

After his ordination, he was initially assistant parish priest at St. Patrick's Cathedral, Pune. From 1998 to 2003 he was diocesan director for the basic Christian communities. He then studied social communication in Rome at the Pontifical Gregorian University and obtained his licentiate in 2005. From 2005 he was diocesan director for social communications and head of public relations. From 2008 to 2013 he was also rector of the cathedral. Being skilled in interior design, he was instrumental in renovating and beautifying the cathedral. He has been diocesan consultor since 2009 and from 2012, vicar general of the diocese. From 2013 to 2016 he also headed the diocesan property office and since then he has also been parish priest of the Divine Mercy Church (2016-2019) and finally at St. Anne's Church, Solapur Bazar, Pune, since 2022.

== Episcopate ==
Pope Francis appointed Fr. Malcolm as Bishop of Amravati on 30 November 2023. His episcopal ordination took place on 25 January 2024. The principal consecrator was Archbishop Oswald Cardinal Gracias, and the co-consecrators were Archbishop Elias Gonsalves and Bishop John Rodrigues of Poona in the presence of the apostolic nuncio to India and Nepal, Leopoldo Girelli.
