= Diocese of Aurangabad =

Roman Catholic diocese in Maharashtra, India

Coordinates: 19.8857°N 75.3086°E

Diocese of Aurangabad Dioecesis Aurangabadensis औरंगाबाद बिशपच्या अधिकारातील प्रदेश

Location
- Country: India
- Ecclesiastical province: Nagpur
- Metropolitan: Nagpur

Statistics
- Area: 64,525 km^{2} (24,913 sq mi)
- Population: Total; Catholics: (as of 2012); 10,258,000; 15,623 (0.2%)
- Parishes: 23

Information
- Rite: Latin Rite or Roman rite
- Established: 17 December 1977
- Cathedral: Cathedral of St Francis de Sales in Aurangabad, Maharashtra

Current leadership
- Pope: Leo XIV
- Bishop: Bernard Lancy Pinto
- Metropolitan Archbishop: Elias Joseph Gonsalves
- Bishops emeritus: Ambrose Rebello

The Roman Catholic Diocese of Aurangabad (Latin: Aurangabaden(sis)) is a diocese located in the city of Aurangabad in the ecclesiastical province of Nagpur in India.

== History ==
On 17 December 1977, Paul VI promulgated the papal bull Qui arcano, establishing the Diocese of Aurangabad from the Diocese of Amravati and the Archdiocese of Hyderabad.

According to local sources, the Roman Catholic community numbers around 50,000.

== Bishops ==
- Bernard Lancy Pinto (6 April 2024 - Present)
- Ambrose Rebello (13 May 2015 – 2024)
- Edwin Colaço (20 October 2006 –13 May 2015)
- Sylvester Monteiro (9 February 1999 – 14 August 2005)
- Ignatius D'Cunha (6 February 1989 – 20 January 1998)
- Dominic Joseph Abreo (17 December 1977 – 1 May 1987)
