= Roman Catholic Diocese of Ajmer =

Latin Catholic diocese in Rajasthan, India

Diocese of Ajmer Dioecesis Aimerensis

Location
- Country: India
- Ecclesiastical province: Agra
- Metropolitan: Agra

Statistics
- Area: 157,681 km^{2} (60,881 sq mi)
- Population: Total; Catholics: (as of 2016); 19,827,000; 17,108 (0.0%)
- Parishes: 38
- Schools: 11

Information
- Denomination: Catholic Church
- Sui iuris church: Latin Church
- Rite: Roman Rite
- Established: 22 May 1913; 112 years ago
- Cathedral: Cathedral of the Immaculate Conception in Ajmer
- Patron saint: Our Lady of the Immaculate Conception and St. Francis of Assisi
- Secular priests: 45

Current leadership
- Pope: Leo XIV
- Bishop: John Carvalho
- Metropolitan Archbishop: Albert D'Souza
- Bishops emeritus: Ignatius Menezes, Pius Thomas D'Souza

Map
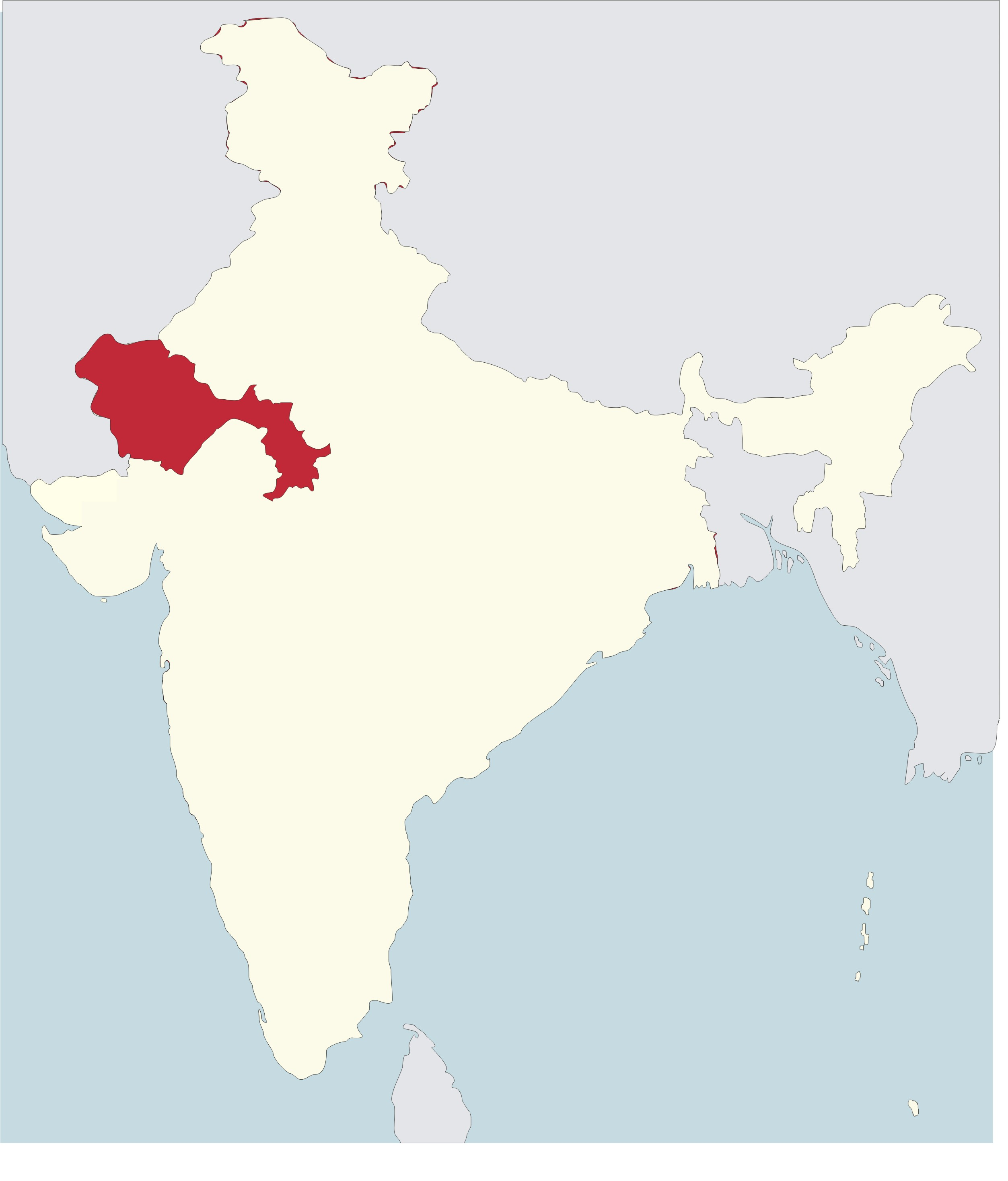

Website
- Website of the Diocese

The Diocese of Ajmer (Latin: Aimeren(sis)) is a Latin Church diocese of the Catholic Church. It is a suffragan diocese in the ecclesiastical province of Agra in northwestern India, yet still depends on the missionary Roman Congregation for the Evangelization of Peoples.

Its cathedral episcopal see is Cathedral of the Immaculate Conception, in Ajmer, Rajasthan state.

== Statistics ==
As per 2014, it pastorally served 9,980 Catholics (0.0% of 22,073,000 total) on 146,690 km² in 10 parishes and 25 missions with 60 priests (40 diocesan, 20 religious), 479 lay religious (27 brothers, 452 sisters) and 18 seminarians.

== History ==
- Established in 1890 as mission sui iuris of Rajputana, on colonial territory split off from its metropolitan, the Archdiocese of Agra
- Promoted in 1891 as Apostolic Vicariate of Rajputana. At this date the district had only one mission station, Jaipur. Besides this, a Catholic priest resided at Ajmer in charge of a small community of Eurasians and Goans, and there were also stations for troops at Nasirabad, Neemuch, and Mhow, served by three military chaplains. After the arrival of French Capuchins, other stations were established at Ratlam, Thandla, Mariapur, Jhabua, Jhalrapatan, Parbatpura, and Bhawanikhera. The prefects were Bertram, 1892–1902, and Henry Fortunatus Caumont, from 1903.
- 22 May 1913: Promoted as Diocese of Ajmer
- Lost territory on 1935.03.11 to establish the Apostolic Prefecture of Indore
- Renamed on 13 May 1955 as Diocese of Ajmer–Jaipur
- Lost territories repeatedly: on 1963.09.13 to establish the Metropolitan Archdiocese of Bhopal, on 1973.04.03 to the Apostolic Exarchate of Sagar and on 1984.12.03 to establish the Diocese of Udaipur
- Renamed on 20 July 2005 as Diocese of Ajmer

The Diocese of Ajmer-Jaipur comprised twenty four districts, namely Ajmer, Alwar, Baran, Barmer, Bikaner, Bundi, Churu, Dausa, Hanumangarh, Jaipur, Jaisalmer, Jalore, Jhalawar, Jhunjhunu, Jodhpur, Karauli, Kota, Nagaur, Pali, Sawai Madhopur, Sikar, Sirohi, Sri Ganganagar and Tonk in the state of Rajasthan. In July, 1890 the Holy See detached a very large portion of the Archdiocese of Agra to form a new unit, the Rajasthan mission entrusting it to the Capuchin Fathers of the Paris Province who were to work under the supervision of the Archbishop. In December, 1891, the new mission became the Prefecture Apostolic of Rajputana and in 1913, Caumont was appointed the first bishop of Ajmer. On 11 March 1935, parts of the diocese which were in the state of Madhya Pradesh were detached to become part of the newly erected Prefecture Apostolic of Indore.

== Ordinaries ==
Suffragan Bishops of Ajmer

- Fortunat-Henri Caumont, OFMCap (born France) (22 May 1913 – death 4 April 1930)
- Mathurin-Pie Le Ruyet, OFMCap (born France) (8 June 1931 – retired 4 July 1938), emeritate as Titular Bishop of Alexandria minor (1938.07.04 – 1961.06.09)
- Guy-Léandre Le Floch, OFMCap (born France) (13 June 1939 – death 9 August 1946)
- D’Mello (first born India) (21 April 1949 – 13 May 1955 see below)

Suffragan Bishop of Ajmer-Jaipur

- D’Mello (see above 13 May 1955 – retired 15 November 1978), died 1987

Suffragan Bishops of Ajmer

- Ignatius Menezes (born India) (15 November 1978 – retired 3 November 2012), later Apostolic Administrator of Diocese of Allahabad (India) (2013.01.31 – 2013.10.17)
- Pius Thomas D'Souza (born India) (3 November 2012 – 1 June 2024), no previous prelature
- John Carvalho (1 March 2025 - Present)

== Causes for canonisation ==
- Fortunat-Henri Caumont, OFMCap, first prelate of the diocese of Ajmer

== See also ==
- List of Catholic dioceses in India

== Sources and external links ==
- GCatholic.org, with Google satellite photo - data for all sections ^{[self-published]}
- Catholic Hierarchy ^{[self-published]}

=== Attribution ===
; the entry cites:

- Madras Catholic Directory, 1910;
- FORTUNAT, Au Pays des Rajas (Paris, 1906).
