= Ignatius D'Cunha =

20th-century Catholic bishop in India

The Most Reverend Ignatius D’Cunha
- Bishop Emeritus of Aurangabad
- Church: Roman Catholic Church
- Archdiocese: Archdiocese of Nagpur
- Province: Bombay
- Metropolis: Bombay
- Diocese: Roman Catholic Diocese of Aurangabad
- See: Archdiocese of Nagpur (emeritus)
- Installed: 20 January 1998
- Term ended: 11 October 2007
- Predecessor: Bishop Dominic Joseph Abreo
- Successor: Bishop Sylvester Monteiro
- Other post: Bishop of Aurangabad.^{(1989-1998)}

Orders
- Ordination: 7 March 1955
- Consecration: 3 April 1989 by Archbishop Simon Pimenta
- Rank: Bishop

Personal details
- Born: Ignatius D’Cunha; 1 February 1924 Vasai, Maharashtra.
- Died: 11 October 2007 (aged 83) Vasai Maharashtra, India
- Buried: Our Lady of Grace Cathedral Papadi, Vasai, Maharashtra; 19.5612°N 74.2187°E
- Denomination: Roman Catholic
- Residence: Vasai

Styles of Ignatius D'Cunha
- Reference style: Bishop
- Spoken style: Your Excellency
- Religious style: The Most Reverend

Ordination history of Ignatius D'Cunha
History
Episcopal consecration
- Principal consecrator: Archbishop Simon Ignatius Pimenta
- Co-consecrators: Bishop Valerian D’Souza, Bishop Charles Gomes, S.J.

Ignatius D'Cunha (1 February 1924 – 11 October 2007) was the Bishop of the Roman Catholic Diocese of Aurangabad, located in Aurangabad, India. He was ordained priest in 1955 and elevated to Bishop of Aurangabad in 1989. D'Cunha died on 11 October 2007 in Vasai, India.
