= Diocese of Gwalior =

Roman Catholic diocese in Madhya Pradesh, India

Coordinates: 26.2054°N 78.1582°E

Diocese of Gwalior Dioecesis Gwaliorensis

Location
- Country: India
- Ecclesiastical province: Bhopal
- Metropolitan: Bhopal

Statistics
- Area: 33,583 km^{2} (12,966 sq mi)
- Population: Total; Catholics: (as of 2013); 6,010,000; 4,900 (0.1%)

Information
- Rite: Latin Rite
- Cathedral: Cathedral of St John the Baptist in Gwalior

Current leadership
- Pope: Leo XIV
- Bishop: Joseph Thykkattil
- Metropolitan Archbishop: Leo Cornelio

Map
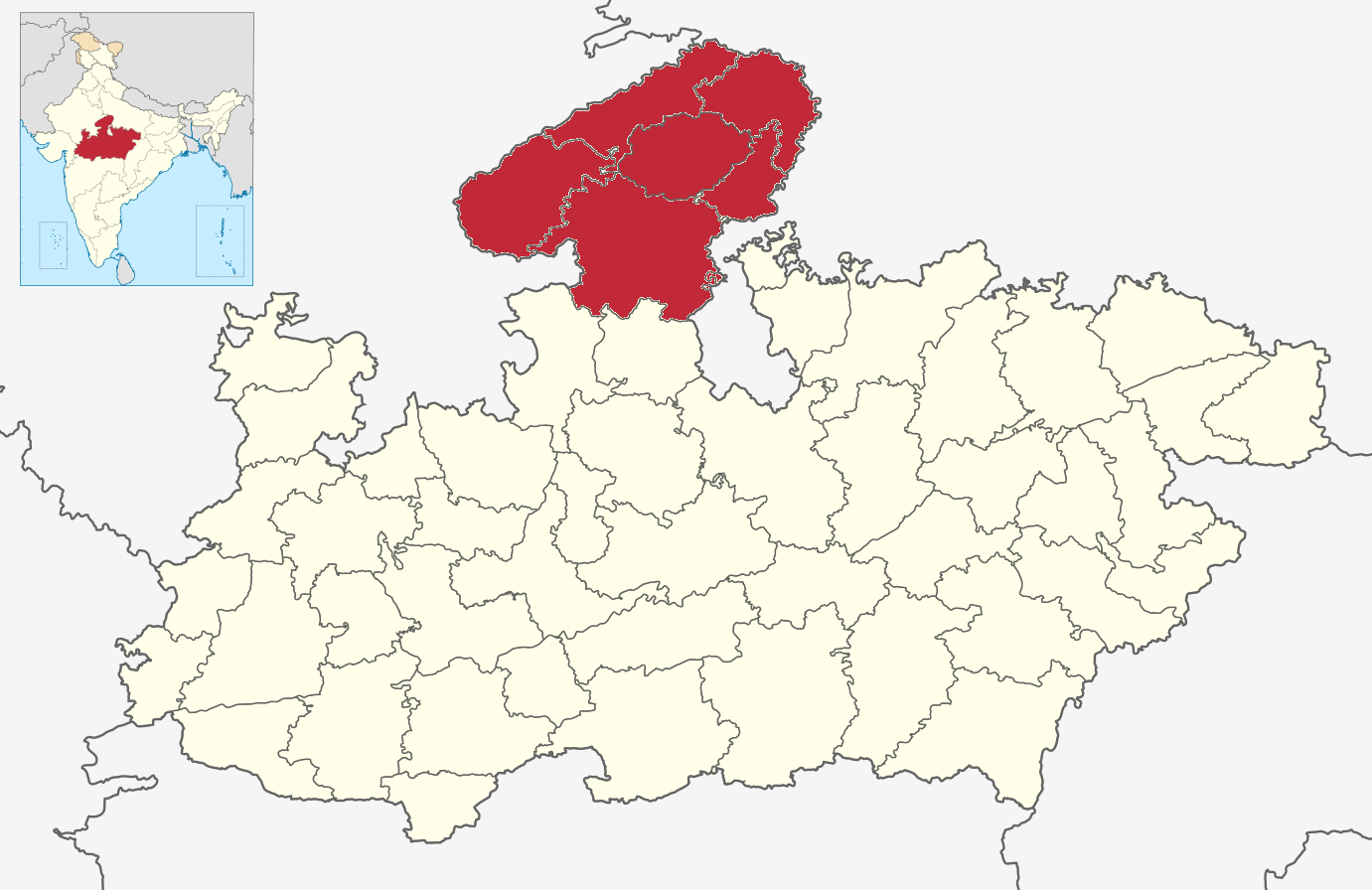

The Roman Catholic Diocese of Gwalior (Latin: Gwalioren(sis)) is a diocese located in the city of Gwalior in the ecclesiastical province of Bhopal in India.

== History ==
There had always been a large number of Christians in the service of Raja Scindia at Gwalior State. In its heyday the Catholic community was reckoned to be one thousand strong. They were scattered in three main camps under the command of three Christian officers.'(Vannini Fr. Fulgentius ofm cap. : Hindustan – Tibet Mission) They were the Lashkar camp, called by the Indians Kampoo, commanded by Colonel Filose; then Sikander Kampoo, commanded by colonel Alexander; thirdly, the Jacob Camp commanded by colonel Jacob. Colonel Filose and Colonel Alexander were Catholics, but Colonel Jacob was an Armenian.

Due to political disturbance and the Napoleonic Wars, the missionaries coming to India were reduced to 12 in 1770, 8 in 1800 and from 1817 to 1822 there were only three missionaries working at different places. Fr. Angelo of Caraglio was working at Agra, Sardhana and Gwalior between the years 1817–1822. With this we can trace that Gwalior was a visiting station from 1817; but from the letter of John Baptist Filose to the Capuchin fathers working at Surat, requesting them to send a chaplain to Gwalior, we can conclude that Gwalior had a visiting chaplain even before 1803 (ibid p. 272).

It seems that due to lack of missionaries, people who were willing to become Christians were baptized without sufficient instruction to the catholic faith. Therefore, missionaries coming after them had a difficult time. There was another group of Christians who had come from Goa in search of employment in the Scindia dominion.

The present church of St. John the Baptist was built by John Baptist Filose, roundabout the year 1828. Fr. Constant Fernandez, a Goan Diocesan Priest was the first residing chaplain of Lashkar and he laboured from 1832 to 1844. He was succeeded in August 1844 by Fr. Anastasius Hartmann, a Swiss Capuchin. He worked 18 months at Gwalior. During his stay he opened a school for the education of poor children, established an industrial centre for the employment of young girls and widows, provided the station with a burial ground and education uplift of his flock. His whole idea was to make the Christians better, to get them to lead a real Catholic life.

He was appointed Bishop of Derne and First Vicar Apostolic of Patna on 30 September 1845. It was during this year that Agra Mission was divided into two separate Vicariates: Agra and Patna. Before this the whole of North India, known as the prefecture Apostolic of Tibet & Hindustan, was constituted into the Vicariate Apostolic of Agra, in 1820.

The list of the Chaplains at Gwalior is rather long. There have been 33 Chaplains from 1832 till it was dismembered from the Agra Archdiocese (established in 1886) and added the diocese of Jhansi on 5 July 1954. The priests who were involved as parish priests at Gwalior were Fr. Roger ofm Cap., Fr. M. Joseph, Fr. Alphonse C., Fr. Abraham Palakudy, Fr. Joseph, Palakudy and Fr. John C. Kedari, Fr. P. Martin, Fr. Eugene. Six districts of M.P. cover within the diocese of Gwalior. They are Bhind, Datia, Gwalior, Morena, Sheopur and Shivpuri.

== Leadership ==
- Bishops of Gwalior (Latin Rite)
  - Bishop Joseph Kaithathara (9 February 1999 – 18 October 2016)
  - Bishop Thomas Thennatt (18 October 2016 – 14 December 2018)
  - Bishop Joseph Thykkattil (31 May 2019 – present)
