= Devprasad John Ganawa =

Indian Roman Catholic bishop (1951–2026)

The Most Reverend Devprasad John Ganawa S.V.D.
- Bishop of Udaipur
- Archdiocese: Agra
- Diocese: Udaipur
- Appointed: 21 December 2012
- Predecessor: Joseph Pathali
- Successor: Sede vacante
- Other post: Apostolic Administrator of Jhabua (2012–2015)
- Previous post: Bishop of Jhabua (2009–2012)

Orders
- Ordination: 27 October 1982
- Consecration: 16 June 2009 by Leo Cornelio, Chacko Thottumarickal and Abraham Viruthakulangara

Personal details
- Born: Devprasad John Ganawa; 8 December 1951 Panchkui, Madhya Pradesh India
- Died: 4 October 2026 (aged 74) Udaipur, Madhya Pradesh, India
- Denomination: Roman Catholic
- Motto: The Joy of Hope

Devprasad John Ganawa, S.V.D. (8 December 1951 – 4 October 2026) was an Indian Roman Catholic bishop. He was latter Bishop of Udaipur.

== Early life ==
Ganawa was born in Panchkui, Madhya Pradesh, India on 8 December 1951. He completed his studies at the Seminary of St. Thomas and at the Jnana-Deepa Vidyapeeth.

== Priesthood ==
On 27 October 1982, Ganawa was ordained a priest for the Society of the Divine Word.

== Episcopate ==
Ganawa was appointed bishop of the Roman Catholic Diocese of Jhabua on 11 May 2009 by Pope Benedict XVI and consecrated on 16 June 2009 by Leo Cornelio. On 21 December 2012, he was appointed bishop of the Roman Catholic Diocese of Udaipur by Pope Benedict XVI. He also served as apostolic administrator of Jhabua from 21 December 2012 to 10 October 2015. His episcopal motto was THE JOY OF HOPE.

== Death ==
Ganawa died from a cardiac arrest at a hospital in Udaipur, on 4 October 2026, at the age of 74.

== See also ==
- List of Catholic bishops of India

Catholic Church titles
Preceded by Joseph Pathali	Bishop of Udaipur; 2012–2026	Succeeded by Sede vacante
Preceded by Chacko Thottumarickal	Bishop of Jhabua; 2009–2012	Succeeded by Basil Bhuriya
