= Topno =

Topno is an Indian surname. Notable people with the surname include:

- Frida Topno (1925–2018), Indian politician
- Manohar Topno (born 1958), Indian field hockey player
- Paschal Topno (1932–2025), Indian Roman Catholic archbishop
- Rajeev Topno (born 1974), Indian civil servant
