= St. Aloysius Senior Secondary School =

Coordinates: 23.1541471°N 79.9533422°E

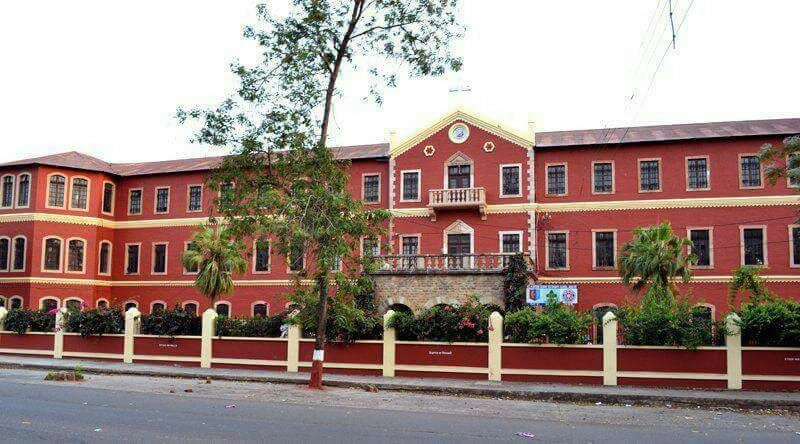

Location
- 1, Shakti Marg; Sadar Cantonment; Jabalpur, Madhya Pradesh, 482001; India

Information
- School type: Private
- Motto: Virtus in Arduo (Excellence Through Hardship)
- Religious affiliation: Roman Catholic
- Patron saint: Aloysius Gonzaga
- Established: 1868
- Founder: Fr. Amedee Delalex
- Sister school: St. Aloysius Senior Secondary School, Polipathar; St. Aloysius Senior Secondary School, Rimjha
- School board: Central Board of Secondary Education
- School number: 1030055
- President: Bishop Valan Arasu
- Rector: Rev. Fr. V. V. Davies
- Average class size: 45 pupils in one section
- Education system: Coeducational
- Classes offered: Kindergarten to Class XII
- Language: English
- Houses: Red, Green & Yellow
- Yearbook: The Aloysian
- Website: Official website

St. Aloysius Senior Secondary School is a co-ed catholic school located in the city of Jabalpur, Madhya Pradesh, India. It is affiliated to Central Board of Secondary Education. Established in the year 1858, it is one of the oldest schools in India.

== History ==
In 1858, Fr. Thevenet (Nagpur Diocese), obtained a piece of land from the military authorities, and built a temporary chapel, which was blessed on 22 June 1858. Fr. Amedee Delalex started the school exclusively for boys in that church in 1868. The school followed the University of Cambridge International Examinations. The primary section of the school was recognised in the year 1873, and the classes were held in the new church building, which was constructed in the same year. The middle section of the school got recognised in 1884 by the British government. The present building was erected by Fr. Thevenet to house the school for Europeans and was later extended for Indians also. The school started boarding European students in 1887, while the Indian boarding section was started in 1903, which later became the St. Thomas School, and now functions as a separate school.

India gained independence from the British in 1947, and the European boarding section was shut down in 1949, which later became a part of the present St. Aloysius College. Post independence, the school got affiliated to the Board of Secondary Education, Madhya Pradesh. Computer education was started in the year 1987 from class III onwards. The school affiliated with the Central Board of Secondary Education, New Delhi in 1992, and became coeducational in the year 1998, admitting girls along with boys. Smart classes were introduced in 2008.

== Administration ==
The Roman Catholic Diocese of Jabalpur runs schools, colleges, hospitals, cathedrals and boardings. Jabalpur Diocesan Educational Society (JDES) manages the educational institutions. It also conducts non-formal education and medical camps, both in urban and rural areas. It came into existence on 3 May 1968. The Catholic Bishop of the Diocese of Jabalpur is the president of the society.

The society has more than 30 schools and boardings in the urban and rural areas of Jabalpur, Shahdol, Sagar, Anuppur, Umaria, Seoni, Katni, Mandla and Dindori districts. Apart from the schools and boardings, it conducts non-formal education classes and also conducts social service activities like medical camps, social awareness programmes, etc. in the rural areas. The society also administers several cathedrals, the St. Aloysius Schools at Polipathar and Rimjha, the St. Thomas School, St. Aloysius Institute of Technology, St. Aloysius College, all situated in Jabalpur, and the Katra Hospital in Mandla.

== Admission ==
The school has an open-admission policy. It is done solely on the basis of merit. Normally admission in Pre-K.G. takes place in the months of December & January. At the time of admission to Pre-K.G., the child should have completed 4 years. The age of admission to the other classes should be reckoned accordingly.

== Notable alumni ==
- Admiral Jal Cursetji - 10th Chief of the Naval Staff of India.
- Lt. General K. T. Parnaik - Governor of Arunachal Pradesh.
- Lt. General WAG Pinto - 8th General Officer Commanding-in-Chief of the Central Command.
- Maj. General G. D. Bakshi - Retired major general of Indian Army, leading defence analyst of India.
- Dr. Jitendra Malik - Indian-American academic, who is the Arthur J. Chick Professor of Electrical Engineering and Computer Sciences at University of California, Berkeley.
- Sethurathnam Ravi - Former chairman of the Bombay Stock Exchange.
- Ron Norris - Represented India in boxing at the 1952 Summer Olympics.
- Tarun Bhanot - Former finance minister of Madhya Pradesh
- Neelesh Awasthi - Member of the Madhya Pradesh Legislative Assembly.
- Ankit Raaj - Model, film and television actor.
- Lt. General Yogendra Dimri-General Officer Commanding-in-Chief of the Central Command
- Lt. General KL D’Souza-Deputy Chief of army staff
- Lt. General Pradeep Bhalla
- Capt Uday Kumar Sondhi(IN)- Shaurya Chakra awardee(first amputee combat helicopter pilot of India)

== Gallery ==
Other establishments

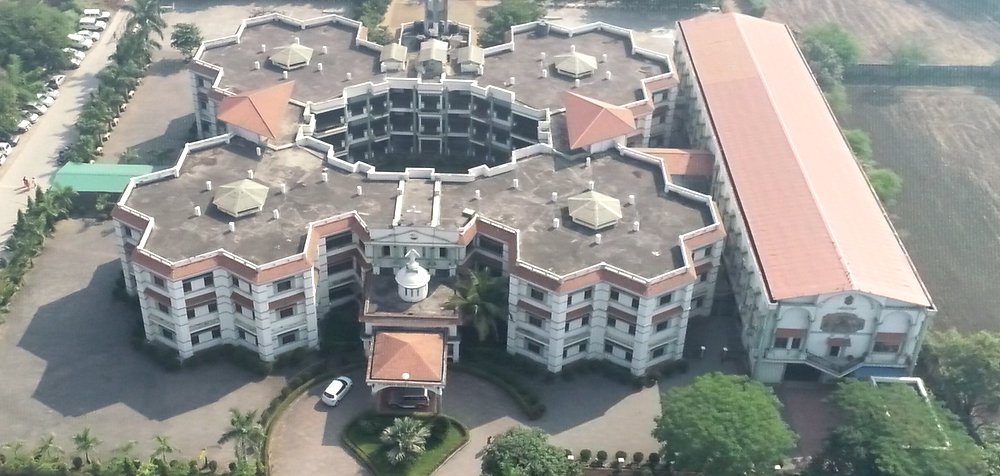
St. Aloysius Senior Secondary School, Rimjha, Jabalpur

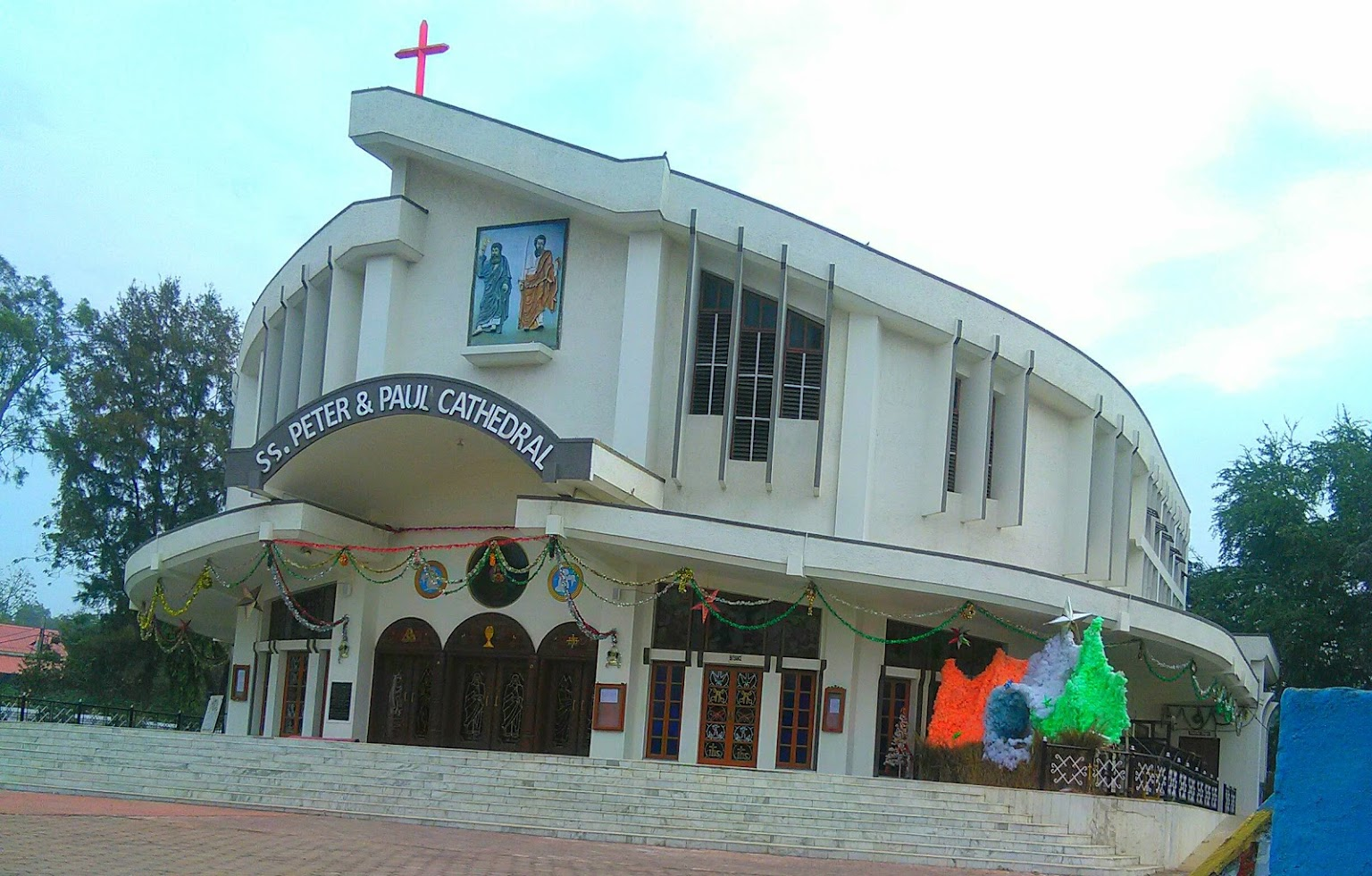
Sts. Peter and Paul Cathedral, Jabalpur

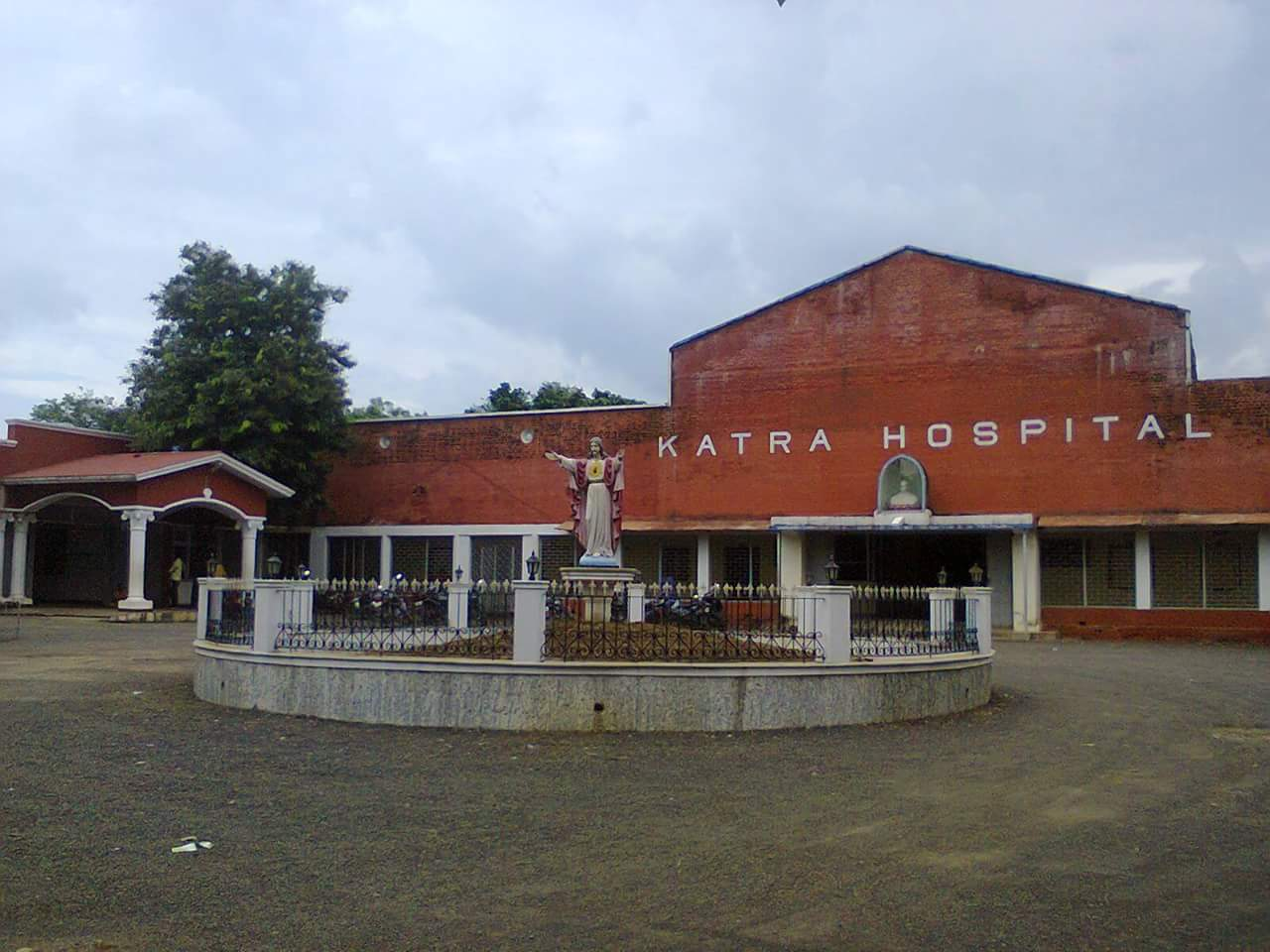
Katra Hospital, Mandla

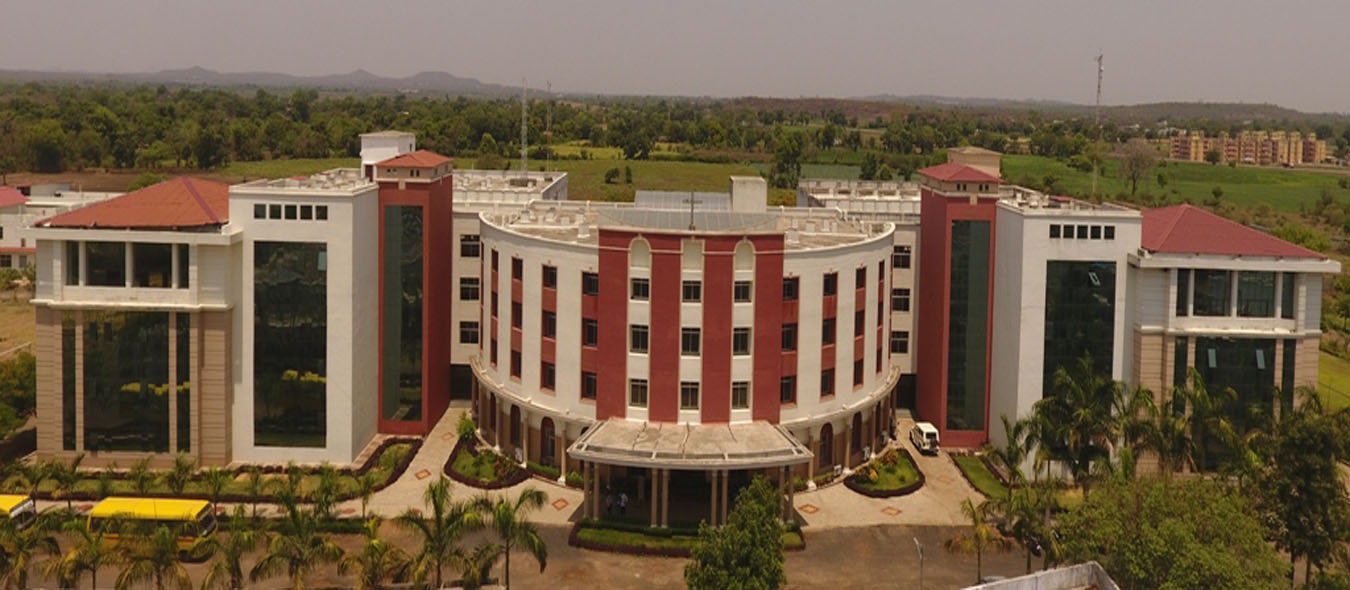
St. Aloysius Institute of Technology, Jabalpur
