= Joseph Pathalil =

Indian Roman Catholic prelate (1937–2022)

The Most Reverend Joseph Pathalil
- Bishop of Udaipur
- Diocese: Udaipur
- Appointed: 3 December 1984
- Term ended: 21 December 2012
- Predecessor: Post created
- Successor: Devprasad John Ganawa

Orders
- Ordination: 21 September 1963
- Consecration: 14 February 1985 by Ignatius Menezes

Personal details
- Born: 26 January 1937 Nedumkunnam, Travancore, British Raj
- Died: 12 April 2022 (aged 85) Udaipur, Rajasthan, India

Joseph Pathalil (26 January 1937 – 14 April 2022) was an Indian Roman Catholic prelate.

Pathalil was born in India and was ordained to the priesthood in 1963. He served as bishop of the Roman Catholic Diocese of Udaipur, India, from 1984 until his retirement in 2012.

Catholic Church titles
Preceded by Post created	Bishop of Udaipur; 1984–2012	Succeeded by Devprasad John Ganawa
