= Diocese of Jhabua =

Roman Catholic diocese in Madhya Pradesh, India

Coordinates: 22.7728°N 74.5922°E

Diocese of Jhabua Dioecesis Jhabuensis

Location
- Country: India
- Ecclesiastical province: Bhopal
- Metropolitan: Bhopal

Statistics
- Area: 21,366 km^{2} (8,249 sq mi)
- Population: Total; Catholics: (as of 2006); 4,216,482; 32,202 (0.8%)

Information
- Rite: Latin Rite
- Cathedral: Cathedral of the Annunciation in Jhabua

Current leadership
- Pope: Leo XIV
- Bishop: Peter Rumal Kharadi
- Metropolitan Archbishop: Alangaram Arockia Sebastian Durairaj

Website
- Website of the Diocese

The Roman Catholic Diocese of Jhabua (Latin: Jhabuen(sis)) is a diocese located in the city of Jhabua in the ecclesiastical province of Bhopal in India.

== History ==
- 25 March 2002: Established as Diocese of Jhabua from the Diocese of Indore and Diocese of Udaipur

== Bishops ==
- Chacko Thottumarickal, S.V.D. (25 March 2002 – 24 October 2008)
- Devprasad John Ganawa, S.V.D. (11 May 2009 – 21 December 2012)
- Basil Bhuriya, S.V.D. (18 July 2015 – 6 May 2021)
- Peter Rumal Kharadi (30 December 2023 – present)
