= Diocese of Jabalpur =

Diocese of Jabalpur may refer to:

- Roman Catholic Diocese of Jabalpur
- Diocese of Jabalpur (Church of North India)
