= Diocese of Bhopal =

Diocese of Bhopal may refer to:

- Roman Catholic Archdiocese of Bhopal
- Diocese of Bhopal (Church of North India)
