= Thomas Thennatt =

Indian Roman Catholic bishop (1953–2018)

Thomas Thennatt S.A.C.
- Bishop of Gwalior
- Church: Catholic Church
- Diocese: Diocese of Gwalior
- In office: 18 October 2016 – 14 December 2018
- Predecessor: Joseph Kaithathara
- Successor: Joseph Thykkattil

Orders
- Ordination: 21 October 1978 by Joseph Gabriel Fernandez
- Consecration: 8 January 2017 by Abraham Viruthakulangara

Personal details
- Born: 26 November 1953 Koodalloor, State of Travancore–Cochin, India
- Died: 14 December 2018 (aged 65) Gwalior, Madhya Pradesh, India

Thomas Thennatt, SAC (26 November 1953 – 14 December 2018) was an Indian Roman Catholic bishop.

Thennatt was born in India and was ordained to the priesthood in 1978. He served as bishop of the Roman Catholic Diocese of Gwalior, India, from 2016 until his death in 2018.
