= Pius Thomas D'Souza =

Indian bishop

The Most Reverend Pius Thomas D'Souza DCanL
- Bishop Emeritus of Ajmer
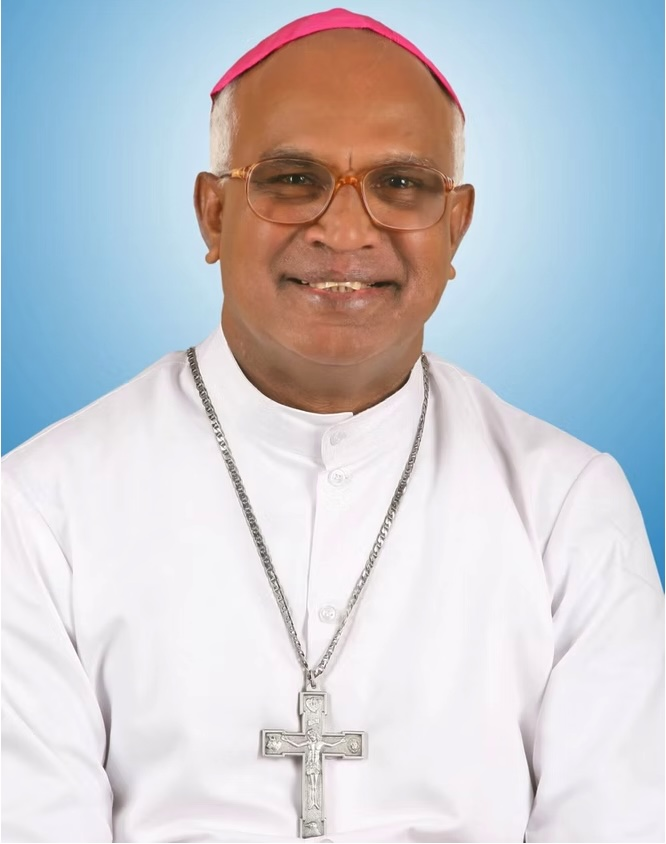
- Church: Roman Catholic Church
- Archdiocese: Roman Catholic Archdiocese of Agra
- Diocese: Roman Catholic Diocese of Ajmer
- See: Ajmer
- Installed: 19 January 2013
- Term ended: 1 June 2024
- Predecessor: Ignatius Menezes
- Successor: John Carvalho

Orders
- Ordination: 28 March 1982
- Consecration: 19 January 2013 by Archbishop Salvatore Pennacchio
- Rank: Bishop

Personal details
- Born: Pius Thomas D’Souza; 4 May 1954 (age 72) Bantwal, Karnataka, India
- Denomination: Roman Catholic
- Education: Pontifical Urban University
- Motto: But To Serve

Styles of Pius Thomas D'Souza
- Reference style: The Most Reverend
- Spoken style: Your Grace

Ordination history of Pius Thomas D'Souza
History
Episcopal consecration
- Principal consecrator: Archbishop Salvatore Pennacchio
- Co-consecrators: Archbishop Albert D’Souza, Bishop Ignatius Menezes

Bishop Pius Thomas D'Souza is bishop emeritus of the Roman Catholic Diocese of Ajmer, India. He resigned on 1 June 2024.

== Early life and education ==
Pius Thomas D'Souza was born in Agrar, Mangalore, India on 4 May 1954. He completed his doctorate in canon law from the Pontifical Urban University, Rome.

== Priesthood ==
Pius was ordained a priest on 28 March 1982 for the diocese of Lucknow initially but later he was Incardinated to the diocese of Bareilly, India on 19 January 1989.

== Episcopate ==
He was Appointed Bishop of Ajmer on 3 November 2012 by Pope Benedict XVI and consecrated by Salvatore Pennacchio on 19 January 2013 at the Immaculate Conception Cathedral.
