= Elias Joseph Gonsalves =

The Most Reverend Elias Joseph Gonsalves
- Archbishop of Nagpur
- Archdiocese: Nagpur
- Diocese: Roman Catholic Archdiocese of Nagpur
- See: Nagpur
- Appointed: 3 December 2018
- Predecessor: Abraham Viruthakulangara
- Previous post: bishop of the Roman Catholic Diocese of Amravati

Orders
- Ordination: 11 April 1990
- Consecration: 29 September 2012 by Oswald Gracias

Personal details
- Born: 4 July 1961 (age 65) Chulne, Vasai West, Vasai, Maharashtra, India
- Education: Coady International Institute

Styles of Elias Joseph Gonsalves
- Reference style: The Most Reverend
- Spoken style: Your Excellency
- Religious style: Monsignor

Archbishop Elias Joseph Gonsalves is the current archbishop of the Roman Catholic Archdiocese of Nagpur, India.

== Early life ==
Gonsalves was born on 4 July 1961 in Chulne, Vasai West, Vasai, Maharashtra, India. He studied B.A. in history and economics from Bombay University and community based development and leadership and counselling from Coady Institute at St. Francis Xavier University in Canada.

== Priesthood ==
Gonsalves completed his religious studies at St. Pius X Seminary in Mumbai and, on 11 April 1990, he was ordained a priest for the Roman Catholic Archdiocese of Bombay.

== Episcopate ==
Gonsalves was appointed bishop of the Roman Catholic Diocese of Amravati on 11 July 2012 and consecrated on 29 September 2012. He was appointed archbishop of the Roman Catholic Archdiocese of Nagpur.

== See also ==
- List of Catholic bishops of India
