= Amedee Delalex =

Amedee Delalex (1826-1889) was a Catholic priest, most noted for his work with the Indian Christian community and English soldiers in Jabalpur.

== Career ==
After reaching India he took pains to learn the local languages. Delalex writes; "I am now busy learning the languages; English, Tamil, Hindustani, I have a great desire to learn these languages so as not to remain dumb in front of so many people". His salary as a military chaplain provided him with ample financial resources which he shared with others. He contributed generously for the construction of the SFS school in Nagpur and from 1870 he was able to establish the infrastructure of Jabalpur mission.

Delalex had to celebrate two Masses on Sundays preaching in English for 400 Catholic European soldiers and in Tamil to Indian soldiers and local Christians. He taught Catechism, encouraged devotion to the Blessed Sacrament and the Way of the Cross, and made regular visits to hospitals. In his capacity as a military chaplain he was in charge of the stations of Narmada Valley, visiting Assirgarh Fort every second month and Pachmarhi twice a year, Hoshangabad, Mandla, Narsingpur, Seoni, Nagode, Khandwa and other places.

The St. Aloysius Senior Secondary School, Jabalpur began in the same chapel by Delalex in 1868 with six orphan boys. Their number increased with time, and in 1873 the primary section was recognized by the government. Delalex took great pains to find employment for them in Government Offices and in the Indian Railways. The inauguration of the railway line joining Bombay (Mumbai) to Calcutta (Kolkata) was done in 1870. As quoted in Fr. Claude Montagnoux's letter, On March 7th Prince Alfred one of the sons of Queen Victoria presided over the celebration at Jabalpur, accompanied by the Governor General, many Rajas and high British officials. The establishment of the Railway Junction brought many new Christians to Jabalpur.

The following years (1871-1881) were important years for the Christian community In Jabalpur. Fr. John Thevenet spent two years in Jabalpur to build the church (1871-1872). As he moved out of Jabalpur, Delalex stepped in and became the architect, mason and general bursar, besides his other activities. Within a few years Jabalpur had a convent, orphanage and boarding for girls (1875), a school, orphanage and boarding for boys (1876), and new presbytery (1881) which later became the Bishop's House.

Delalex served a number of roles: military chaplain, parish priest, spiritual director of nuns, Manager of the School, and providence of the poor. His efforts were publicly acknowledged by Rev. Gray, a Protestant minister, who in 1873, thanked him for all that he had done for the Protestant children who were attending the Catholic School. Delalex who at first shouldered the whole burden of the parish and school, was later helped by priests and brothers. In 1869, a young theology student was teacher of the school, playing the harmonium and directing the church choir. Later, Fr. Montagnoux was there for eight months, also Fr Balmand, Fr J. M. Crochet, Fr. Bozon, Fr Souchon were military chaplains who helped Delalex.

== Death ==
A septic wound on the left hand fifteen days earlier caused swelling of the arm and blood poisoning. An operation by two doctors could not cure him and he died on the morning of Wednesday 10 July 1889, at the age of 63, after 4 days in bed with fever. Fr. Bonaventure and Fr. Souchon were at his bed side. Fr. Bonaventure writes:

Fr. Delalex was loved and admired by all. His funeral was attended by a huge crowd of all classes of society. A Funeral mass was sung by Fr. Souchon at 11 a.m. on 11 July, burial at 7-30 p.m. – Long procession headed by a military Band of the Derby Regiment, the cross carried by altar boys and followed by school children and orphans, priests preceding the body of Fr. Delelax placed on a gun carriage drawn by six horses and followed by the sergeants of the Artillery and line Regiment, officers on horseback, soldiers, Christians and many non-Christians. I thought I could see the good father smiling down from heaven and telling what all he had told his doctor: “You are taking too much trouble for me.” Blessed are those who die in the Lord.”
