= Eparchy of Satna =

Eastern Catholic ecclesiastical province in Madhya Pradesh, India

Location
- Country: India
- Ecclesiastical province: Archeparchy of Ujjain

Statistics
- Area: 44,158 km^{2} (17,049 sq mi)
- Population: Total; Catholics: (as of 2023); 11,085,760; 2836 (0.0%)
- Parishes: 16

Information
- Denomination: Syro-Malabar Church
- Sui iuris church: Syro-Malabar Church
- Rite: East Syriac rite
- Established: 28 July 1968; 58 years ago
- Cathedral: Cathedral of St Vincent [in Satna]
- Patron saint: St Vincent de Paul
- Secular priests: 59 (43 Diocesan, 16 Religious Orders)

Current leadership
- Pope: Mar Leo XIV
- Major Archbishop: Mar Raphael Thattil
- Bishop: Mar Joseph Kodakallil
- Metropolitan Archbishop: Mar Sebastian Vadakel, M.S.T.
- Bishops emeritus: Mathew Vaniakizhakkel, C.V.

Map
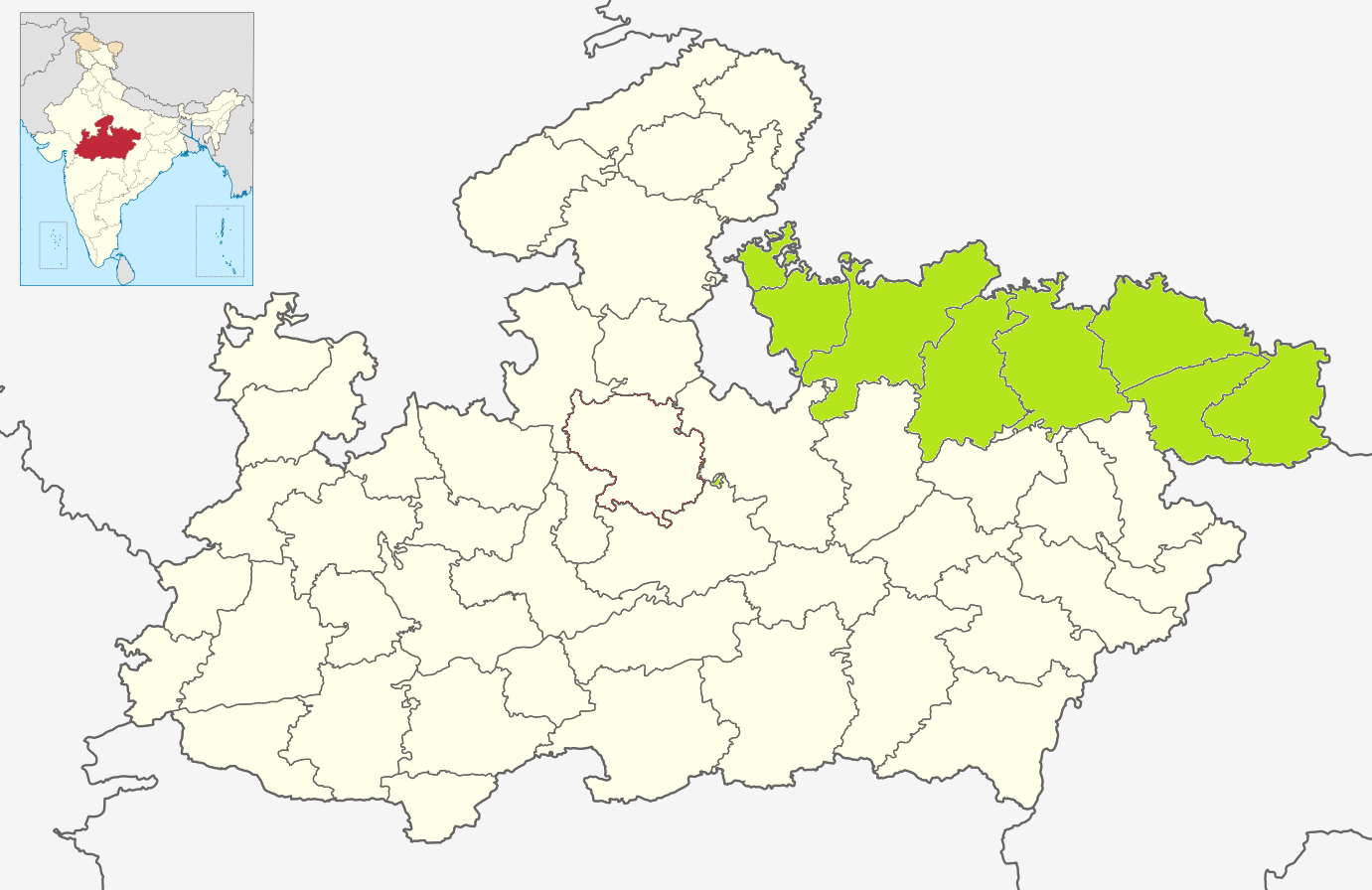

Website
- Website of the Diocese

The Eparchy of Satna is an Eastern Catholic eparchy in India, under the Syro-Malabar Catholic Church based in the town of Satna. It is spread out in the northern part of the state Madhya Pradesh. It is made a suffragan eparchy of the Archeparchy of Ujjain after its half-century of evanglization in Madhyapradesh. It was erected exarchate and entrusted to the clerical society of Vincentian Congregation of St.Thomas region based in Rewa (now it is shifted to Ujwa P.O., New Delhi after it was raised to the statues of a Province and the number of diocesan priests increased) by the Holy See on 29 July 1968 by the papal bull In More Est of Pope Paul VI. Msgr Abraham D Mattam of Vincentian Congregation was nominated its first Apostolic Exarch on 15 August 1968.

The exarchate was raised to the rank of an Eparchy on 12 March 1977 by the Papal Bull Ecclesiarum Orientalium of Pope Paul Vi and Mar Abraham D Mattam was appointed the first Eparch of Satna. The Installation and erection of the Eparchy took place on 31 July 1977.

On 2 September 2014, the college of Eparchial Consultors elected Very Rev Fr George Mangalapilly as the Administrator of the Eparchy.

The territory of the Eparchy of Satna is reorganized by including, together with the ten civil districts of Madhya Pradesh already under its jurisdiction-Chhatarpur, Rewa, Panna, Satna, Sidhi, Tikamgarh, Singrauli, Niwari, Maihar and Mauganj the following 9 civil districts of Madhya Pradesh: Jabalpur, Mandla, Shahdol, Dindori, Umaria, Katni, Anuppur, Damoh, and Narsinghpur, as well as 6 civil districts of Uttar Pradesh: Jhansi, Jalaun, Banda, Chitrakoot, Hamirpur, and Mahoba.

== Territorial History ==
- 29 July 1968: Erected as the Archiepiscopal Exarchate of Satna on territory split from the Roman Catholic Diocese of Jabalpur.
- 26 February 1977: Elevated to Eparchy of Satna.
- 28 August 2025: Translated from the Roman Catholic Metropolitan Archdiocese of Bhopal to the Syro-Malabar Metropolitan Archeparchy of Ujjain, and gained territory in central and eastern Madhya Pradesh as well as southwestern Uttar Pradesh.

== Ordinaries ==
Apostolic Exarch of Satna (East Syriac Rite)

- Abraham D. Mattam, C.V. (29 July 1968 – 26 February 1977 see below)

Eparchs of Satna (East Syriac Rite)

- Abraham D. Mattam, C.V. (26 February 1977 – 18 December 1999), retired
- Matthew Vaniakizhakel, C.V. (18 December 1999 – 27 August 2014), resigned
- Joseph Kodakallil (22 July 2015 – Present)
