= G. D. Bakshi =

Retired Indian Army officer

Major General G. D. Bakshi SM VSM
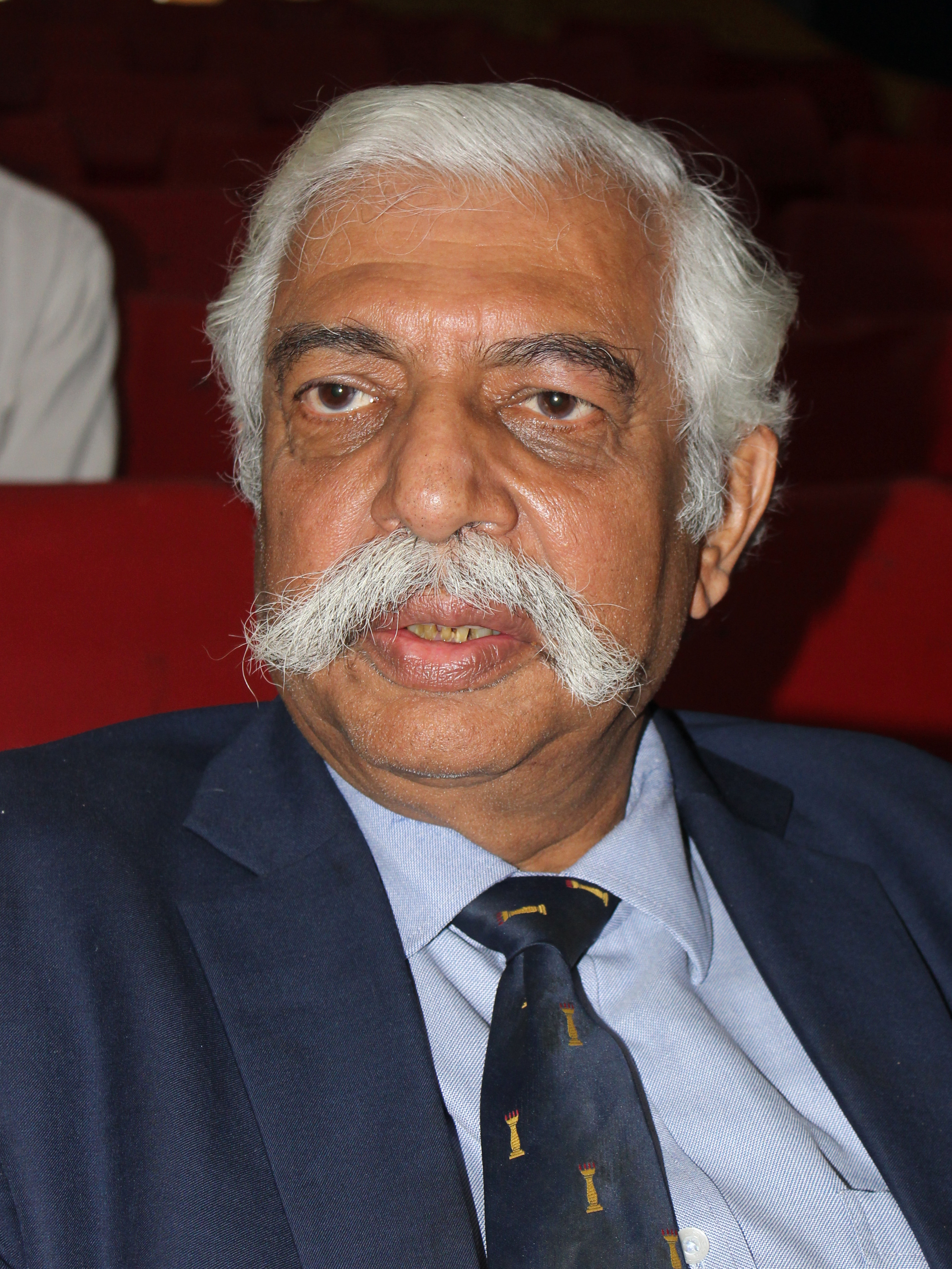
- Born: Gagan Deep Bakshi; 1950 (age 75–76); Jabalpur, Madhya Pradesh, India
- Military career
- Allegiance: India
- Branch: Indian Army
- Service years: 1971–2008
- Rank: Major General
- Unit: 6 Jammu and Kashmir Rifles
- Commands: Romeo Force; 6 Jammu and Kashmir Rifles
- Conflicts: Indo-Pakistani War of 1971 and Kargil War
- Awards: See § Awards and decorations

Major General Gagan Deep Bakshi SM VSM (born 1950) is a retired officer of the Indian Army.

== Early life and education ==
G. D. Bakshi was born in Jabalpur, Madhya Pradesh into a Mohyal Brahmin family, to S. P. Bakshi, who was the Chief Education Officer of the Jammu & Kashmir State Forces. He studied at St. Aloysius Senior Secondary School, Jabalpur. After his schooling, he went to the National Defence Academy at Khadakwasla, Pune.

== Career ==
Bakshi was commissioned into 6 Jammu and Kashmir Rifles in November 1971 and was deployed on the eastern theatre (Bangladesh front) at the outbreak of hostilities. He first served on the “China front” and then with Mukti Bahini forces supporting the liberation of Bangladesh. He later went on to command that unit. He was posted in Punjab during the height of Sikh militancy. As a commanding officer (then Lt Col), he led his Sikh troops against khalisthani militants and worked to maintain unit cohesion and local support.

Bakshi was awarded the Vishisht Seva Medal for commanding a battalion in Kaksar, that falls in Drass, Kargil sector during 1987 border skirmishes. Later, he was awarded the Sena Medal for distinguished service in commanding a battalion during counter-insurgency drives.

Bakshi subsequently commanded the Romeo Force (Part of Rashtriya Rifles) during intensive counter-insurgency operations in the Rajouri and Poonch districts of Jammu and Kashmir and succeeded in suppressing the armed militancy in this area. He organized Village Defence Guards (VDGs) and employed effective tactics to suppress terrorists. His efforts brought an end to major civilian killings and enabled displaced villagers to return. Bakshi served two tenures at the Director General of Military Operations (India) and was the first BGS (IW) at the Northern Command, where he dealt with Information Warfare and Psychological Operations. He retired in 2008.

== Awards and decorations ==

Sena Medal	Vishisht Seva Medal	Special Service Medal	Sangram Medal
Operation Vijay Medal	Sainya Seva Medal	High Altitude Service Medal	50th Anniversary of Independence Medal
25th Anniversary of Independence Medal	30 Years Long Service Medal	20 Years Long Service Medal	9 Years Long Service Medal

== Bibliography ==
- Bakshi, G. D. (2019). Bose Or Gandhi: Who Got India Her Freedom?. KW Publishers Pvt Limited. ISBN 978-93-87324-67-1.
- Bakshi, G. D. (2018). Guardians of the Gate: A Military History of the Mohyal Fighting Brahmins. KW Publishers Pvt Limited. ISBN 978-93-86288-77-6.
- Bakshi, G. D. (2019). Bose Or Gandhi: Who Got India Her Freedom?. KW Publishers Pvt Limited. ISBN 978-93-87324-67-1.
- China's Military Power: A Net Assessment: A Net Assessment. KW Publishers Pvt Ltd. 15 January 2015. ISBN 978-93-85714-01-6.
- Bakshi, G. D. (2013). Kishtwar Cauldron: The Struggle Against the ISI's Ethnic Cleansing. Pentagon Press. ISBN 978-81-8274-736-4.
- Bakshi, G. D. (2010). Limited Wars in South Asia: Need for an Indian Doctrine. Centre for Land Warfare Studies. ISBN 978-93-80502-45-8.
- The Rise of Indian Military Power: Evolution of an Indian Strategic Culture: Evolution of an Indian Strategic Culture. KW Publishers Pvt Ltd. 15 July 2015. ISBN 978-93-85714-07-8.
- Bakshi, G. D. (2002). Footprints in the Snow: On the Trail of Zorawar Singh. Lancer Publishers. ISBN 978-81-7062-292-5.
- Bakshi, G. D. (2002). Afghanistan: The First Faultline War. Lancer Publishers. ISBN 978-81-7062-220-8.
- Bakshi, G. D. (1990). Mahabharata, a Military Analysis. Lancer International. ISBN 978-81-7062-094-5.

== Controversies ==
According to Nandita Singh of ThePrint, Bakshi has promoted fake news and misinformation on multiple occasions. In 2019, he wrongly claimed that a soldier was jailed in Tihar following a 2014 incident involving the death of a civilian in Budgam, and Mehbooba Mufti as CM had ordered no checking of vehicles. Fact checkers found these claims to be false because Mufti was not a CM at that time and there is no evidence of such an order that prevented checking of vehicles. Lt Gen Deependra Singh Hooda rejected the claim that a soldier was jailed after the Budgam incident.

Bakshi has claimed that more than Quit India Movement, it was Indian National Army (INA) who was responsible in bringing independence to India. Bakshi depends on flawed arguments not supported by academic literature while making these claims. The Print cites his position as a trustee in Netaji Bose INA Trust as one of the reason to downplay Quit India Movement.

In 2021, Bakshi shared images to claim that Pakistani soldiers were killed in Panjshir conflict. This claim was debunked by fact checkers who found the images falsely claimed Pakistani actors working in a military-themed film to be actual soldiers.

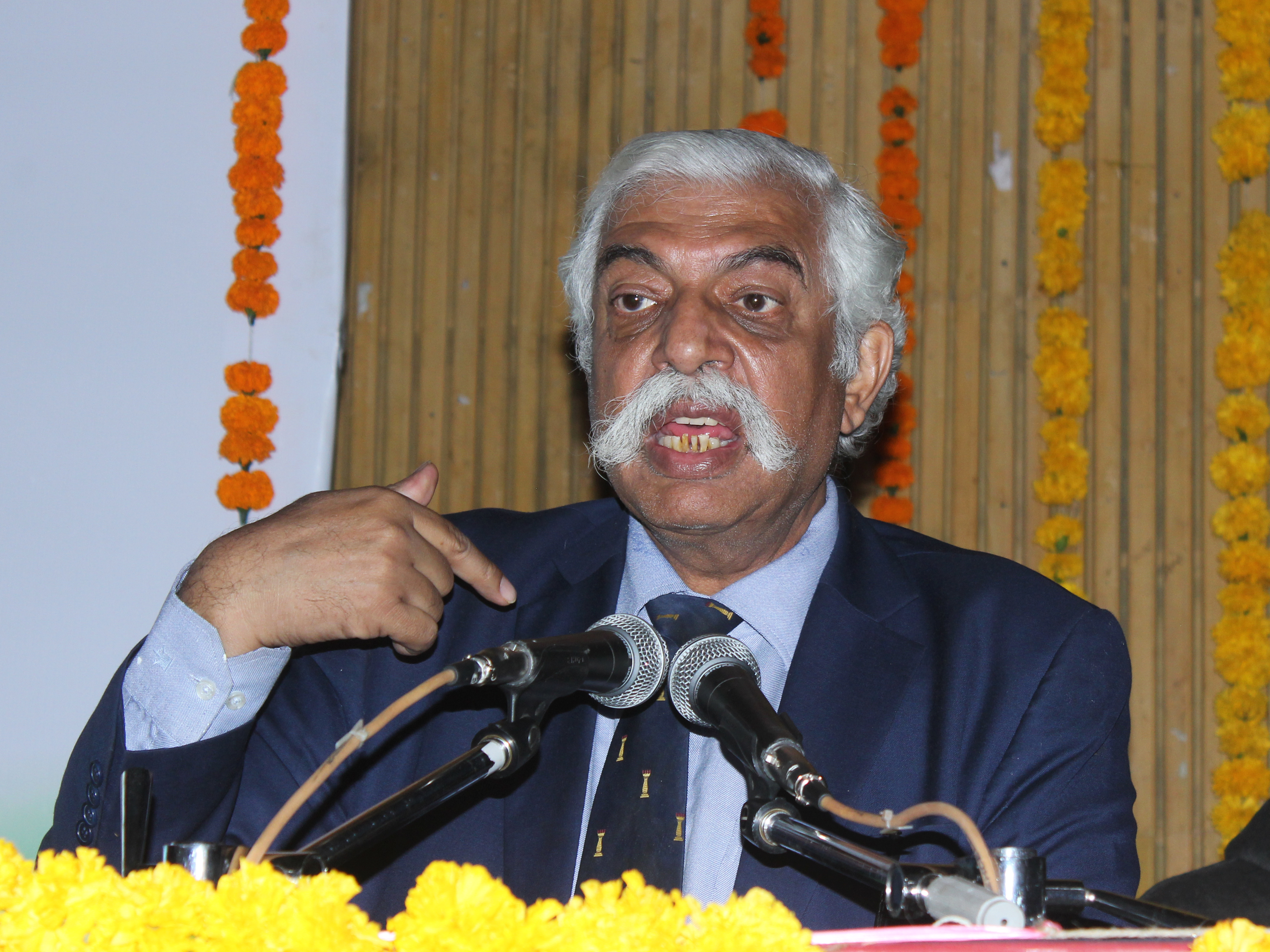
GD Bakshi during a National Seminar

He is sometimes called on news channels for his views on politics and he often appears on Republic TV, where he frequently defends narrative of Arnab Goswami. His analysis is often criticized by other journalists for having a strong bias favouring the ruling government's agenda. In one debate at Republic TV he was criticized for using profane language.

Another video was surfaced, where he used foul word of Randi Khana (Brothel), Bakshi was heavily criticized for using this foul word.
