= Théophane Matthew Thannickunnel =

Indian Roman Catholic bishop

Théophane Matthew Thannickunnel (23 September 1928 – 18 November 2016) was a Roman Catholic bishop.

Ordained to the priesthood in 1959, Thannickunnel served as the bishop of the Roman Catholic Diocese of Jabalpur, India from 1975 to 2001.
