= Abraham D. Mattam =

Syro-Malabar Catholic bishop (1922–2019)

His Excellency Abraham D. Mattam VC
- Bishop Emeritus of Satna
- Church: Syro-Malabar Catholic Church
- See: Syro-Malabar Catholic Diocese of Satna
- In office: 1968–1999
- Predecessor: none
- Successor: Mar Mathew Vaniakizhkkel, Mar Joseph Kodakallil
- Previous post: prelate

Orders
- Ordination: 15 March 1950

Personal details
- Born: 21 November 1922 Narianganam, India
- Died: 16 April 2019 (aged 96) Edappally, India

Abraham D. Mattam (21 November 1922 – 16 April 2019) was a bishop of the Syro-Malabar Catholic Church.

== Biography ==
Mattam was born in Narianganam, India and ordained a priest on 15 March 1950 from the religious order of Vincentian Congregation (Institute of Consecrated Life). He was appointed Archiepiscopal Exarch of Satna on 29 July 1968. He was appointed bishop to the Syro-Malabar Catholic Diocese of Satna on 26 February 1977 and ordained bishop on 30 April 1977. He retired from the diocese on 18 December 1999.
