= Paschal Topno =

Indian Roman Catholic prelate (1932–2025)

His Excellency Paschal Topno
- Archbishop Emeritus of Bhopal
- Archdiocese: Bhopal
- Appointed: 20 May 1994
- Term ended: 15 June 2007
- Predecessor: Eugene Louis D’Souza
- Successor: Leo Cornelio
- Previous post: Bishop of Ambikapur (1985–1994)

Orders
- Ordination: 31 July 1965
- Consecration: 18 January 1986 by Eugene Louis D’Souza

Personal details
- Born: 15 June 1932 Torpa, Bihar and Orissa Province, British India
- Died: 6 April 2025 (aged 92) Ambikapur, Chhattisgarh, India
- Motto: Ego sum pastor bonus

Paschal Topno (15 June 1932 – 6 April 2025) was an Indian Roman Catholic prelate. He was bishop of Ambikapur from 1985 to 1994 and archbishop of Bhopal from 1994 to 2007. Topno died on 6 April 2025, at the age of 92.

Catholic Church titles
Preceded by Eugene Louis D’Souza	Archbishop of Bhopal; 1994–2007	Succeeded by Leo Cornelio
Preceded by Philip Ekka	Bishop of Ambikapur; 1985–1994	Succeeded by Patras Minj
