= Diocese of Khandwa =

Roman Catholic diocese in Madhya Pradesh, India

Coordinates: 21.8287°N 76.3570°E

Diocese of Khandwa Dioecesis Khandvaënsis

Location
- Country: India
- Ecclesiastical province: Bhopal
- Metropolitan: Bhopal

Statistics
- Area: 24,000 km^{2} (9,300 sq mi)
- Population: Total; Catholics: (as of 2006); 4,521,350; 30,601 (0.7%)

Information
- Rite: Latin Rite
- Cathedral: St Mary’s Cathedral in Khandwa

Current leadership
- Pope: Leo XIV
- Bishop: Bishop Mar Augustine Madathikunnel
- Metropolitan Archbishop: Alangaram Arockia Sebastian Durairaj

Map
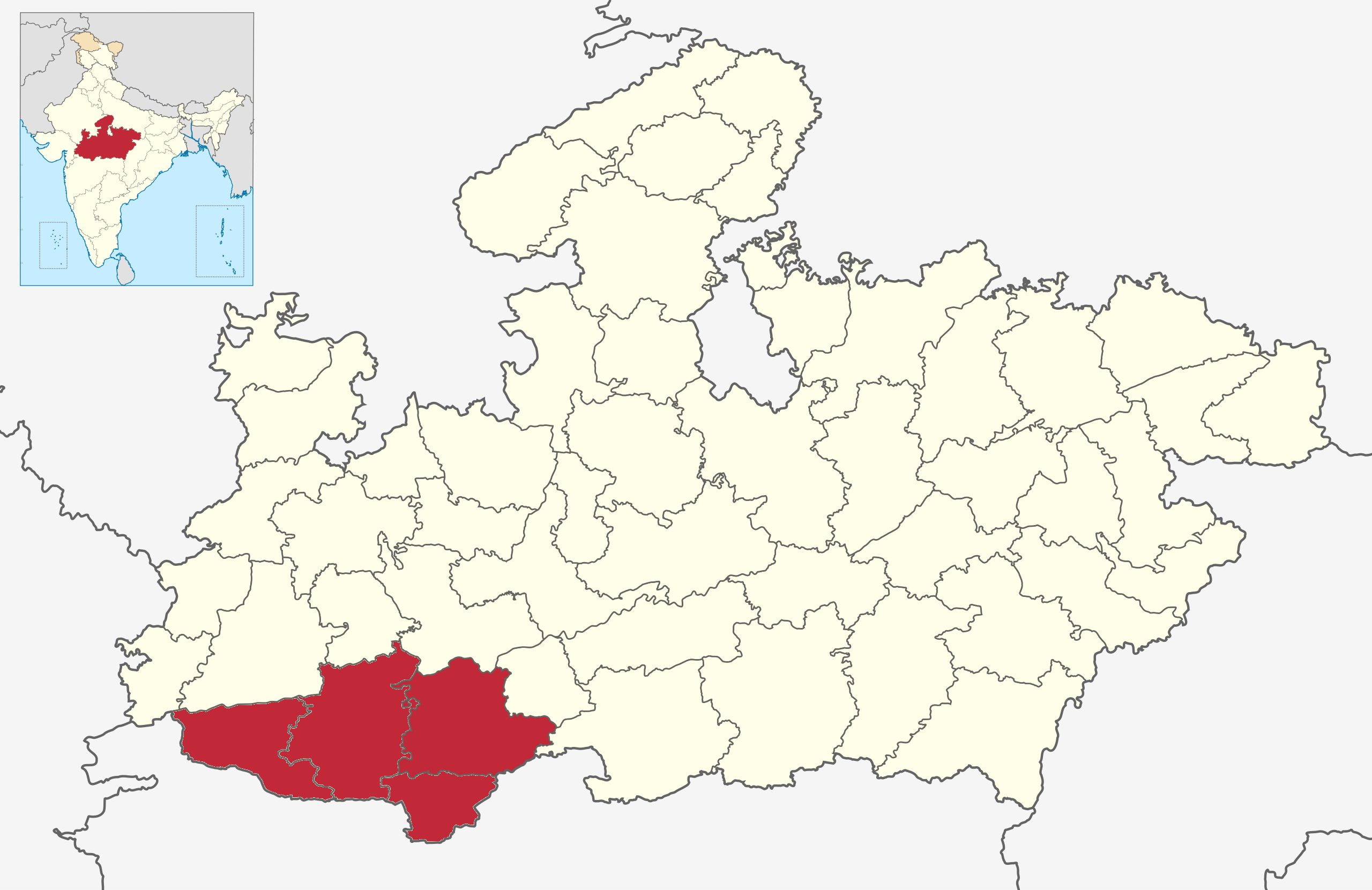

Website
- Website of the Diocese

The Roman Catholic Diocese of Khandwa (Latin: Khandvaën(sis)) is a diocese located in the city of Khandwa in the ecclesiastical province of Bhopal in India.

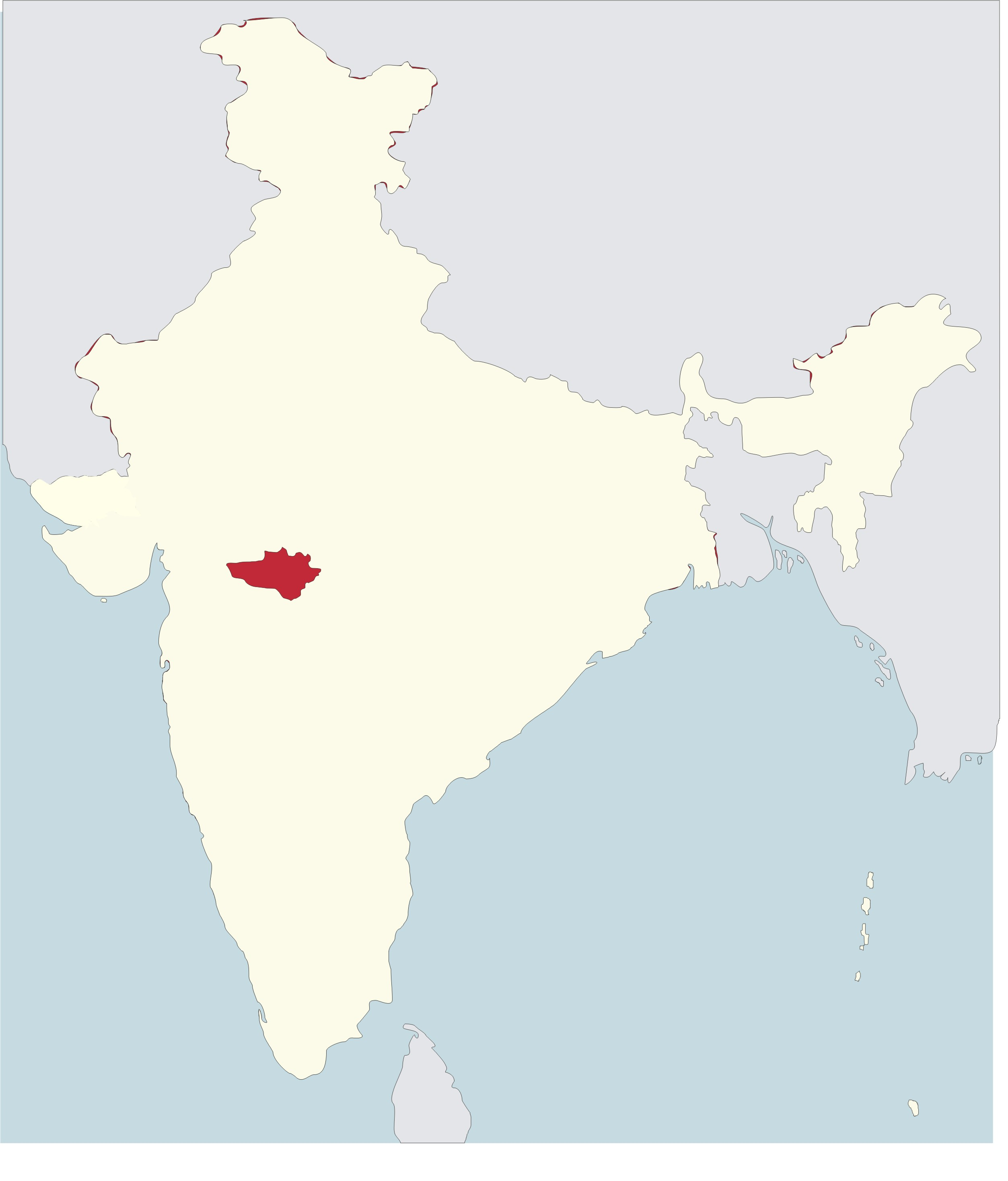
Map showing the location of the Diocese of Khandwa in India

== History ==
On February 3, 1977, the Diocese of Khandwa was established from the Diocese of Indore. It falls under the Metropolitan Archdiocese of Bhopal. The diocese follows the Latin (or Roman) rite.

== Leadership ==
- Bishops of Khandwa (Latin Rite)
  - Bishop A.A.S Durairaj (May 11, 2009 – October 4, 2021)
  - Bishop Leo Cornelio (later Archbishop) (June 3, 1999 – June 15, 2007)
  - Bishop Abraham Viruthakulangara (later Archbishop) (March 4, 1977 – January 17, 1998)
