= Sethurathnam Ravi =

Indian chartered accountant

Mr Sethurathnam Ravi
- Born: 12 July 1959 (age 66); Delhi
- Other name: S Ravi
- Citizenship: Indian
- Education: Bachelor's and Master's in Commerce from Durgavati University, Madhya Pradesh
- Alma mater: St. Aloysius Senior Secondary School Durgavati University, Madhya Pradesh
- Occupations: Chartered Accountant, Promoter, Managing Partner
- Known for: Former Chairman of Bombay Stock Exchange (BSE)
- Board member of: IDBI Bank, LIC, ONGC, BHEL, SBI Payments Services Pvt. Ltd, Tourism Finance Corporation of India, PCBL.
- Spouse: Bhuvana Ravi
- Children: Abhishek Ravi, Akshay Ravi
- Parents: Dr. T. S. Sethurathnam (father); Sakuntala Sethurathnam (mother)
- Website: https://sethurathnamravi.com/

Sethurathnam Ravi, also known as S Ravi, is an Indian chartered accountant (CA), the promoter and managing partner of Ravi Rajan & Co. LLP, and the former Chairman of the Bombay Stock Exchange (BSE). He is a prominent figure in the Indian financial sector and serves on the boards of numerous companies and organizations.

== Early life and education ==
Sethurathnam Ravi did his schooling from the St. Aloysius Senior Secondary School, Jabalpur, and completed his Bachelor’s and Master’s degree in Commerce from Durgavati University, Madhya Pradesh. He is a Fellow Member of the Institute of Chartered Accountants of India (ICAI) and holds qualifications as an Information Systems Auditor (DISA). Ravi is also an Insolvency Resolution Professional registered with the Insolvency and Bankruptcy Board of India.

== Career ==
Ravi has held significant positions throughout his career, most notably as the Chairman of the Bombay Stock Exchange (BSE). He has served on the boards of several prominent institutions, including IDBI Bank, LIC, ONGC, BHEL, and others. Ravi has also been a member of the Securities and Exchange Board of India (SEBI) Takeover Panel and the Institute of Chartered Accountants of India (ICAI).

In 2003, Ravi was appointed by the Government of India and the Reserve Bank of India (RBI) as the Chairman of the Technical Experts Committee for the strategic turnaround of Punjab & Sind Bank. In 2019, he joined the board of SBI Payments Services Pvt. Ltd as a Director.

Additionally, Ravi has been associated with various organizations in senior roles. He served on the boards of UTI Company Pvt Ltd., SMERA Ratings, SBI-SG Global Securities, STCI Finance, and BOI Merchant Bankers.

Ravi is a frequent speaker at industry events organized by regulatory bodies such as ICAI, RBI, and SEBI. His expertise spans corporate governance, financial regulations, and the capital markets.

== Recent appointments ==
In 2023, Ravi was appointed as a Non-Executive Independent Director of the Board of PCBL for an initial term of five consecutive years, starting on 15 March 2023.

== Personal life ==
Ravi was born to Dr. T. S. Sethurathnam and Mrs. Sakuntala Sethurathnam. His father, Dr. T. S. Sethurathnam, was the Chairman of the Madhya Pradesh Electricity Board and BSES. Ravi is married to Mrs. Bhuvana Ravi, and they have two children, Abhishek Ravi and Akshay Ravi.

== Interests and advocacy ==
Sethurathnam Ravi is passionate about sports, gender equality, global climate change, and universal education. He is actively involved in causes that promote social justice and environmental sustainability.
