= Basil Bhuriya =

Indian Roman Catholic bishop (1956–2021)

Basil Bhuriya S.V.D.
- Bishop of Jhabua
- Church: Catholic Church
- Diocese: Diocese of Jhabua
- In office: 18 July 2015 – 6 May 2021
- Predecessor: Devprasad John Ganawa
- Successor: Peter Rumal Kharadi

Orders
- Ordination: 5 May 1986
- Consecration: 10 October 2015 by Salvatore Pennacchio

Personal details
- Born: 8 March 1956 Panchkula, Punjab Hill States Union, India
- Died: 6 May 2021 (aged 65) Indore, Madhya Pradesh, India

Basil Bhuriya (8 March 1956 in Panchkula – 6 May 2021 in Indore) was an Indian Roman Catholic bishop.

Bhuriya was born in Panchkula and was ordained to the priesthood in 1986. He served as bishop of the Roman Catholic Diocese of Jhabua, India, from 2016 until his death in 2021, from COVID-19 at age 65.
