= Leo Cornelio =

The Most Reverend Leo Cornelio S.V.D
- Archbishop Emeritus of Bhopal
- Archdiocese: Roman Catholic Archdiocese of Bhopal
- See: Bhopal
- Appointed: 15 June 2007
- Installed: 16 September 2007
- Term ended: 4 October 2021
- Predecessor: Paschal Topno S.J
- Successor: Alangaram Arockia Sebastian Durairaj S.V.D
- Other posts: Chairman of the CBCI Commission for Youth; Chairperson of the Indian Catholic Youth Movement (ICYM) YCS/YSM at National and Madhya Pradesh, Chhattisgarh level Member of the CBCI Commission for Social Communications; Financial administrator for the Madhya Pradesh; Chhattisgarh Regional Major Seminaries at Bhopal and Ashta.
- Previous posts: General Councillor; Provincial Superior of the SVD Central Indian province; Bishop of Khandwa Diocese; member of Pontifical Council for Migrants and Itinerant People

Orders
- Ordination: 14 November 1972 by Basil Salvadore D'Souza
- Consecration: 8 September 1999 by Abraham Viruthakulangara

Personal details
- Born: 14 March 1945 (age 81) Udupi, Karnataka, India
- Residence: Archbishop's House, 33, Ahmedabad Palace Road, Bhopal – 462 001 MADHYA PRADESH
- Motto: VERBUM DOMINI

Styles of Leo Cornelio
- Reference style: The Most Reverend
- Spoken style: Your Excellency
- Religious style: Monsignor

Leo Cornelio S.V.D. (born 14 March 1945) is an Indian prelate of the Catholic Church who was Archbishop of Bhopal from 2007 to 2021. He was bishop of Khandwa from 1999 to 2007.

== Biography ==
Leo Cornelio was born in Kallianpur, Udupi, on 14 March 1945. At the age of thirteen he joined the Divine Word Missionaries (SVD). He completed his minor seminary studies at Rajeshwar Vidhyalaya, in Mhow, Madhya Pradesh from 1958 to 1962. He studied with the SVD for two years and then spent two years in their novitiate. He completed his studies in philosophy in 1968 and theology in 1972 at the Papal Athenaeum, Pune.

He was ordained a priest on 14 November 1972 and began working at Gyan Ashram in Mumbai. He obtained his Master's degree in English literature from the State University. He also completed a course in theology and spirituality in Rome in 1983. In 1984, he was elected to a three-year term as provincial superior of the SVD's Central Indian province based in Indore, and he was elected to a second term in 1987. He was elected a general councilor of the order at its general chapter held in Rome in June 1988.

He was appointed Bishop of Khandwa by Pope John Paul II on 3 June 1999 and received his episcopal consecration on 8 September 1999.

On 17 February 2001, Pope John Paul named him a member of the Pontifical Council for the Pastoral Care of Migrants and Itinerant People.

He was appointed Archbishop of Bhopal by Pope Benedict XVI on 15 June 2007 and installed there on 16 September 2007.

Pope Francis accepted his resignation on 4 October 2021.
