= Joseph Albert Rosario =

Joseph Albert Rosario, M.S.F.S
- Bishop of Diocese of Amravati (Emeritus)
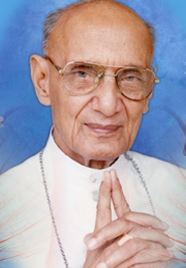
- Church: Roman Catholic Church
- See: Diocese of Amravati
- In office: 1955–1995
- Predecessor: None
- Successor: Edwin Colaço
- Previous post(s): Priest

Orders
- Ordination: 29 September 1944

Personal details
- Born: 30 May 1915; Nagpur, India
- Died: 31 July 2011 (aged 96)

Joseph Albert Rosario, M.S.F.S (30 May 1915 – 31 July 2011) was an Indian prelate of the Roman Catholic Church. He was one of oldest Roman Catholic Bishops and the oldest Bishop from India.

Rosario was born in Nagpur, India on 30 May 1915. He was ordained priest on 29 September 1944 in the religious institute of the Missionaries of St. Francis de Sales. Appointed on 8 May 1955 to the Diocese of Amravati, he was ordained bishop on 13 November 1955, retiring from governance of the see on 1 April 1995.

== Popularity ==
Bishop Rosario was very popular among the non-Catholic masses of Amravati. He was particularly known in the region for his tolerance for other religions.
