= Diocese of Amravati =

Roman Catholic diocese in Maharashtra, India

Coordinates: 23.1369°N 83.1855°E

Diocese of Amravati Dioecesis Amravatensis

Location
- Country: India
- Ecclesiastical province: Nagpur
- Metropolitan: Nagpur

Statistics
- Area: 46,447 km^{2} (17,933 sq mi)
- Population: Total; Catholics: (as of 2012); 10,930,000; 5,054 (0.0%)
- Parishes: 19

Information
- Rite: Latin Rite
- Established: 8 May 1955
- Cathedral: Cathedral of St Francis Xavier in Amravati
- Patron saint: Our Lady of Sorrows; St Francis Xavier

Current leadership
- Pope: Leo XIV
- Bishop: Malcolm Sequeira

Website
- Website of the Diocese

The Roman Catholic Diocese of Amravati (Latin: Amravaten(sis)) is a diocese located in the city of Amravati in the ecclesiastical province of Nagpur in India.

== History ==
- 8 May 1955: Established as Diocese of Amravati from the Metropolitan Archdiocese of Nagpur.

== Leadership ==
- Bishops of Amravati (Latin Rite)
- Bishop Malcolm Sequeira
  - Bishop-elect Elias Gonsalves (11 July 2012 – 3 December 2018) now the apostolic administrator of the diocese
  - Bishop Lourdes Daniel (8 June 2007 – 11 November 2010). He had also been the Apostolic Administrator of the Roman Catholic Diocese of Nashik; he was appointed Bishop of Nashik by Pope Benedict XVI on Thursday, 11 November 2010; at that time he was designated as the temporary Apostolic Administrator of Amravati until the new Bishop was chosen on Wednesday, 11 July 2012
  - Bishop Edwin Colaço (12 May 1995 – 20 October 2006)
  - Bishop Joseph Albert Rosario, M.S.F.S. (8 May 1955 – 12 May 1995)
