= Indian Evangelical Team =

South Asian ministry

The Indian Evangelical Team (IET) is a multi-dimensional ministry focused to empower the oppressed in South Asia. It had its beginning in the mountains of Jammu and Kashmir in India.

== Social Services ==
IET attempts to empower the underprivileged. As part of fulfilling this call, IET educates thousands of children in South Asia and operates literacy centres for illiterate adults. It also carries out disaster relief work, Medical Camp and care for Slum Children

=== Children's Home ===
IET operates ten children’s homes across India. IET has homes for both girls and boys.

=== Community Development ===
The ministries include adult literacy classes, AIDS awareness programs, free schools for village children, vocational training for underprivileged, medical camps, economic vocation, etc.

== Churches ==
In 1972, the first church was opened by P. G. Vargis and his wife Lilly Vargis in the lower Himalayan mountains of Jammu and Kashmir. By 1972, twelve daughter churches were opened in the surrounding mountains. In 1977, IET HQ was shifted to Pathankot and we also started first Bible school. In 1989 IET Established 200 Mission stations in 12 states in India. By the end of 2001, IET had more than 2,893 churches all over North India, Nepal and Bhutan. They ministered to more than 200,000 regular worshippers. This count stands at more than 6,500 as of 31 December 2012.

== See also ==
- Christianity in India
