= Diocese of Udaipur =

Roman Catholic diocese in Rajasthan and Madhya Pradesh, India

Coordinates: 24.5969°N 73.6986°E

Diocese of Udaipur Dioecesis Udaipurensis उदयपुर के सूबा

Location
- Country: India
- Ecclesiastical province: Agra
- Metropolitan: Agra

Statistics
- Area: 47,000 km^{2} (18,000 sq mi)
- Population: Total; Catholics: (as of 2010); 8,112,000; 23,867 (0.3%)

Information
- Rite: Latin Rite
- Cathedral: Our Lady of Fatima Cathedral in Udaipur
- Patron saint: Our Lady Queen of Apostles; St. Paul

Current leadership
- Pope: Leo XIV
- Bishop: Sede vacante
- Metropolitan Archbishop: Raphy Manjaly

Map
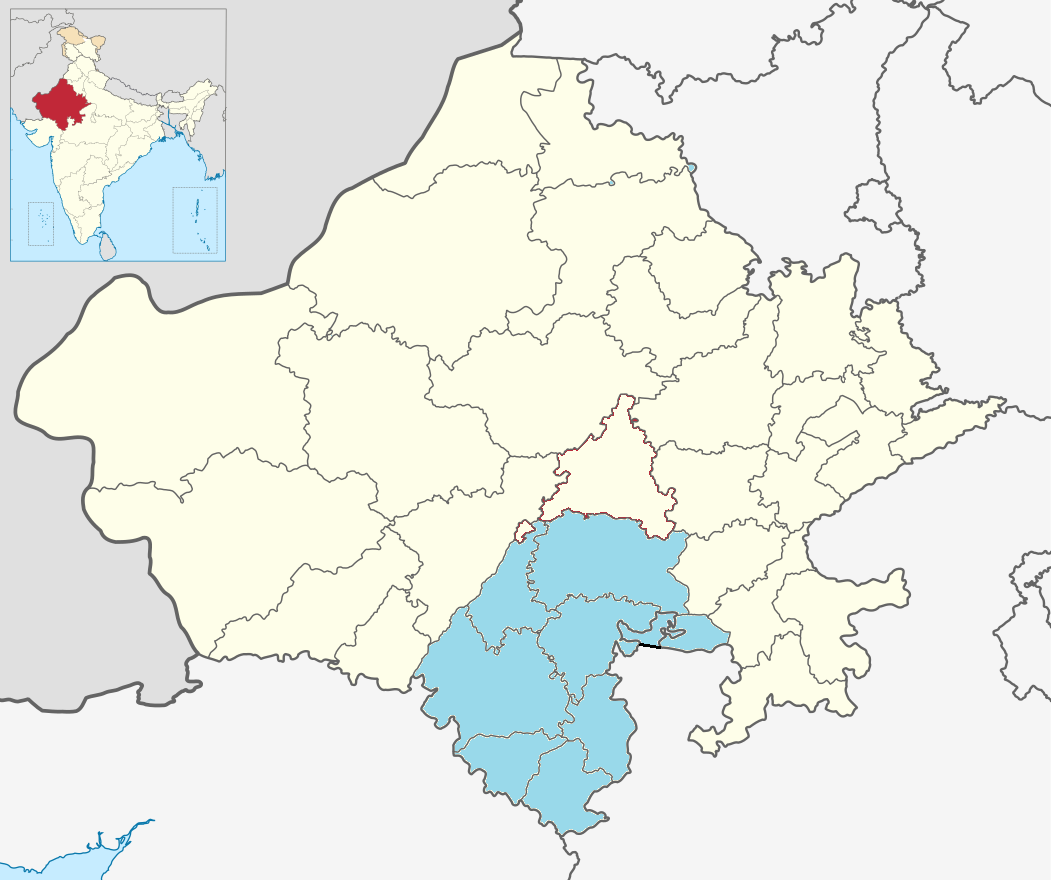

Website
- Website of the Diocese

The Roman Catholic Diocese of Udaipur (Latin: Udaipuren(sis)) is a diocese located in the city of Udaipur in the ecclesiastical province of Agra in India.

== History ==
- 3 December 1984: Established as Diocese of Udaipur from the Diocese of Ajmer–Jaipur

== Leadership ==
- Bishops of Udaipur (Latin Rite)
  - Bishop Joseph Pathalil (3 December 1984 – 21 December 2012)
  - Bishop Devprasad John Ganawa, SVD (21 December 2012 – 4 October 2026)

== Causes for canonisation ==
- Servant of God Fr. Charles de Ploemeur (Alfred Le Neouannis)
