= Archdiocese of Nagpur =

Roman Catholic Archdiocese in Maharashtra, India

Coordinates: 21.1597°N 79.0818°E

Archdiocese of Nagpur Archidioecesis Nagpurensis नागपूर बिशपच्या अधिकारातील प्रदेश
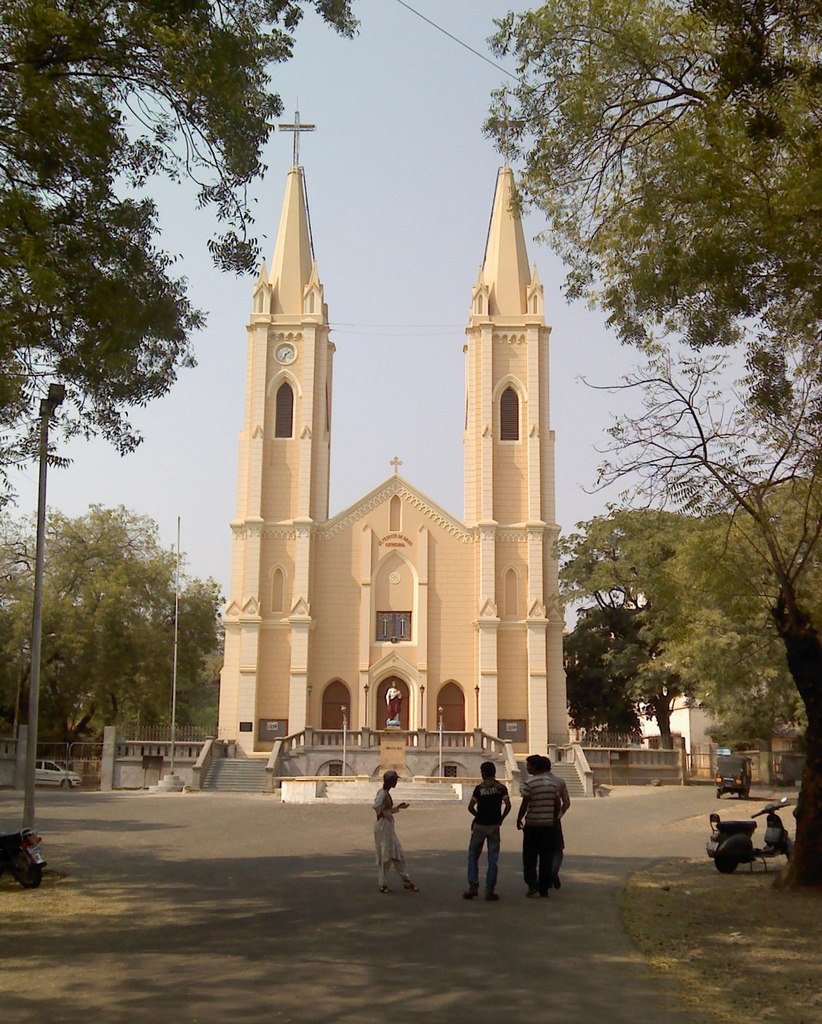
- St. Francis de Sales Cathedral

Location
- Country: India

Statistics
- Area: 55,272 km^{2} (21,341 sq mi)
- Population: Total; Catholics: (as of 2004); 11,000,000; 24,446 (0.2%)
- Parishes: 34

Information
- Rite: Latin Rite
- Cathedral: Cathedral of St Francis de Sales in Nagpur
- Patron saint: St Francis de Sales; Our Lady of Lourdes

Current leadership
- Pope: Leo XIV
- Metropolitan Archbishop: Elias Joseph Gonsalves
- Vicar General: Anthony D'Souza

Website
- Website of the Archdiocese

The Roman Catholic Archdiocese of Nagpur (Latin: Nagpuren(sis)) is a Latin Rite Metropolitan archdiocese in central India, yet depends on the missionary Roman Congregation for the Evangelization of Peoples.

Its cathedral episcopal see is St. Francis de Sales Cathedral, in the city of Nagpur, in Maharashtra state.

== Statistics ==
As per 2014, it pastorally served 25,500 Catholics (0.2% of 12,360,000 total) on 59,042 km^{2} in 34 parishes and 12 missions with 142 priests (48 diocesan, 94 religious), 798 lay religious (265 brothers, 533 sisters) and 23 seminarians.

== History ==
- Established on July 11, 1887, as Diocese of Nagpur, on territory split off from the Diocese of Vizagapatam.
- It lost territories repeatedly : on 1932.07.18 to establish the Apostolic Prefecture of Jubbulpore, on 1935.03.11 to establish the then Apostolic Prefecture of Indore, on 1951.06.14 to establish the Diocese of Sambalpur and on 1951.12.13 to establish the then Diocese of Raigarh–Ambikapur
- Promoted on September 19, 1953, as Metropolitan Archdiocese of Nagpur.
- Lost more territories thrice again : on 1955.05.08 to establish its suffragan Diocese of Amravati, on 1964.01.16 to establish the then Apostolic Prefecture of Raipur and on 1968.07.29 to establish the then Apostolic Exarchate of Chanda (now also a suffragan diocese of Nagpur)

== Ecclesiastical province ==
Its ecclesiastical province comprises the Metropolitan's own archbishopric and these Suffragan bishoprics, Latin Rite except one Syro-Oriental Rite:

- Roman Catholic Diocese of Amravati, its daughter
- Roman Catholic Diocese of Aurangabad
- Syro-Malabar Catholic Eparchy of Chanda, its only Eastern Catholic daughter

== Episcopal ordinaries ==
(all Latin Rite, initially missionary members of a Latin congregation)

Suffragan Bishops of Nagpur

- Charles-Félix Pelvat, Fransalians (M.S.F.S.) (born France) (October 2, 1893 – death July 23, 1900)
- Jean-Marie Crochet (born France) (October 25, 1900 – death June 6, 1903)
- Etienne-Marie Bonaventure, M.S.F.S. (born France) (September 17, 1904 – death March 12, 1907)
- François-Etienne Coppel, M.S.F.S. (born France) (June 22, 1907 – death March 16, 1933)
- Louis-François Gayet, M.S.F.S. (born France) (February 1, 1934 – death August 26, 1950)
- Eugene D’Souza, M.S.F.S. (first Indian incumbent) (July 12, 1951 – September 19, 1953 see below)

Metropolitan Archbishops of Nagpur

- Eugene D’Souza, M.S.F.S. (see above September 19, 1953 – September 13, 1963), later Metropolitan Archbishop of Bhopal (India) (1963.09.13 – death 1994.03.26)
- Leonard Joseph Raymond (January 16, 1964 – death February 1, 1974) (born Pakistan), previously Bishop of Allahabad (India) (1947.04.10 – 1964.01.16)
- Leobard D’Souza (July 1, 1975 – retired January 17, 1998), also vice-president of Conference of Catholic Bishops of India (1988–1991); previously Titular Bishop of Caput Cilla (1964.11.12 – 1965.12.17) & Coadjutor Bishop of Jabalpur (India) (1964.11.12 – 1965.12.17), succeeding as Bishop of Jabalpur (1965.12.17 – 1975.07.01)
  - Auxiliary Bishop: Sylvester Monteiro (1993.12.06 – 1999.02.09), Titular Bishop of Scampa (1993.12.06 – 1999.02.09); next Bishop of suffragan Aurangabad (India) (1999.02.09 – death 2005.08.14)
- Abraham Viruthakulangara (January 17, 1998 – April 19, 2018), previously Bishop of Khandwa (India) (1977.03.04 – 1998.01.17).
- Elias Joseph Gonsalves – 2018.12.03 – present

== Saints and causes for canonisation ==
- Servant of God Sr. Marie Gertrude Gros, SMMI

== Sources and external links ==
- GCatholic.org, with incumbent biography links – data for all sections ^{[self-published]}
- Catholic Hierarchy ^{[self-published]}
