= Roman Catholic Diocese of Jabalpur =

Roman Catholic diocese in Madhya Pradesh, India

Coordinates: 23.1529°N 79.9535°E

Diocese of Jabalpur Dioecesis Iabalpurensis
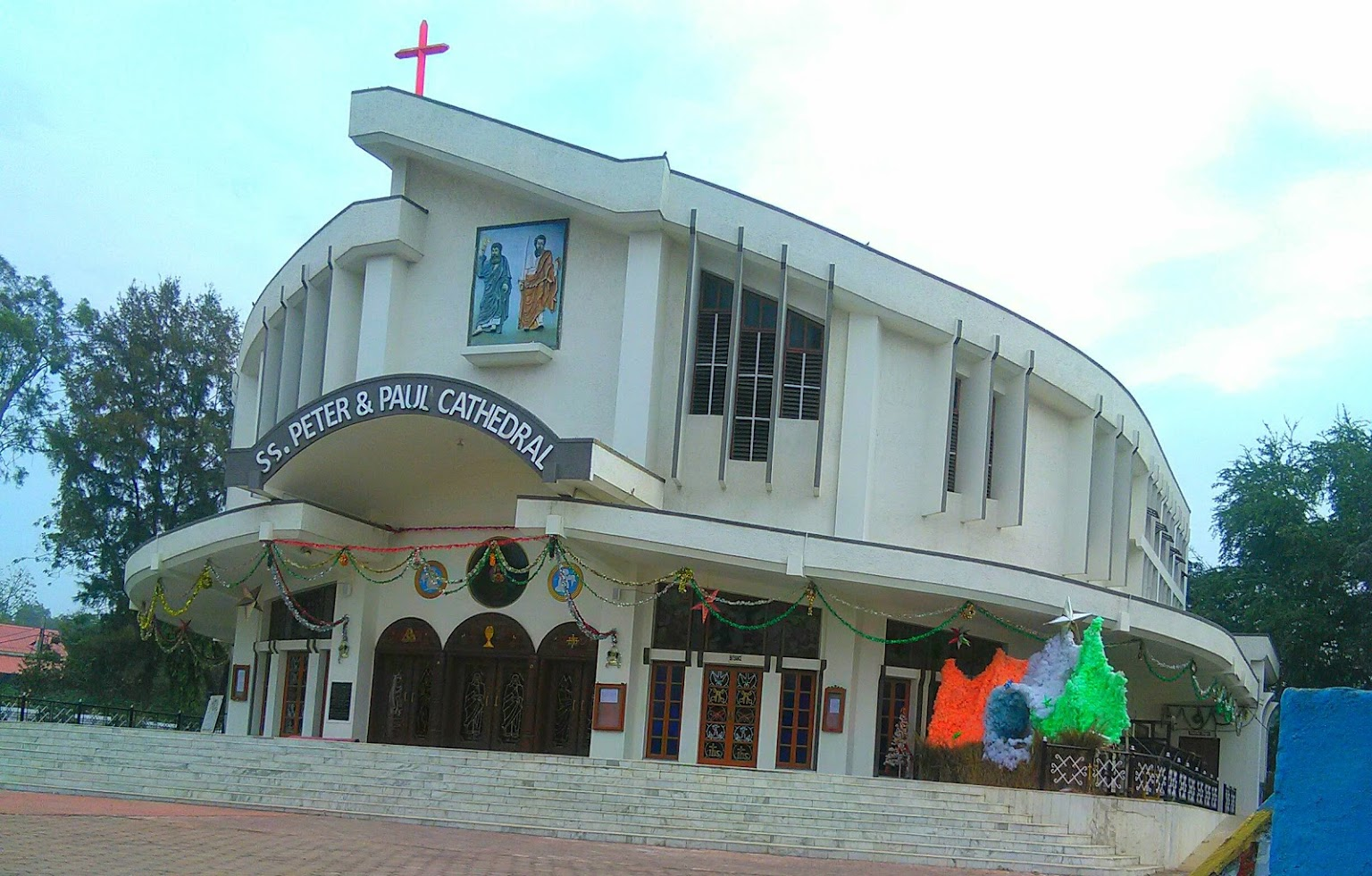

Location
- Country: India
- Ecclesiastical province: Bhopal
- Metropolitan: Bhopal

Statistics
- Area: 52,980 km^{2} (20,460 sq mi)
- Population: Total; Catholics: (as of 2006); 9,032,285; 28,787 (0.3%)

Information
- Rite: Latin Rite
- Cathedral: Cathedral of St Peter and St Paul in Jabalpur

Current leadership
- Pope: Leo XIV
- Bishop: Valan Arasu
- Metropolitan Archbishop: Arockia Sebastian Durairaj
- Bishops emeritus: Gerald Almeida

The Roman Catholic Diocese of Jabalpur (Latin: Iabalpuren(sis)) is a diocese located in the city of Jabalpur in the ecclesiastical province of Bhopal in India.

== History ==
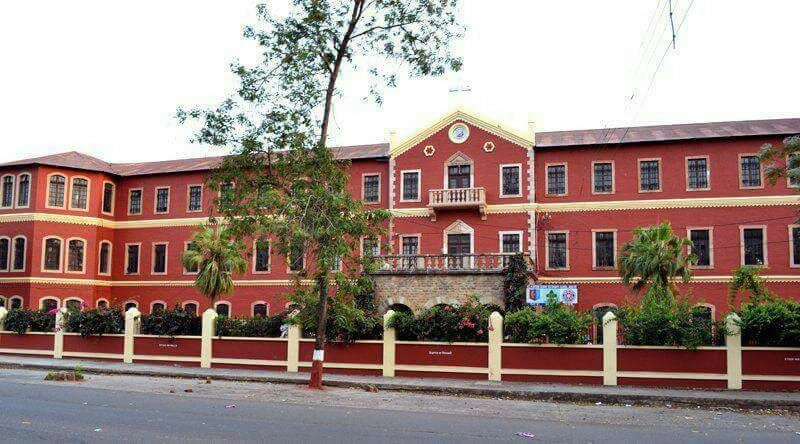
St. Aloysius Senior Secondary School, Jabalpur, established in the year 1868 is among the oldest schools in India

- 18 July 1932: Established as the Apostolic Prefecture of Jubbulpore from the Diocese of Allahabad and Diocese of Nagpur
- 21 October 1950: Renamed as Apostolic Prefecture of Jabalpur
- 5 July 1954: Promoted as Diocese of Jabalpur

== Leadership ==
- Bishops of Jabalpur (Latin Rite)
  - Bishop Valan Arasu (13 January 2024 -)
  - Bishop Gerald Almeida (16 May 2001 – 13 January 2024)
  - Bishop Théophane Matthew Thannickunnel, O. Praem. (1 March 1976 – 16 May 2001)
  - Bishop Leobard D’Souza (later Archbishop) (17 December 1965 – 1 July 1975)
  - Bishop Conrad Dubbelman, O. Praem. (5 July 1954 – 17 December 1965)
- Prefects Apostolic of Jabalpur (Roman Rite)
  - Fr. Conrad Dubbelman, O. Praem. (later Bishop) (29 May 1933 – 5 July 1954)

Bishop Theophane O.Praem was the principal of St. Aloysius Senior Secondary School, Jabalpur.
