= Abraham Viruthakulangara =

Indian archbishop (1943–2018)

The Most Reverend Dr. Abraham Viruthakulangara
- Archbishop Emeritus of Nagpur
- Archdiocese: Roman Catholic Archdiocese of Nagpur
- See: Nagpur
- Appointed: 17 January 1998
- Installed: 22 April 1998
- Term ended: 19 April 2018
- Predecessor: Leobard D’Souza
- Successor: Elias Joseph Gonsalves

Orders
- Ordination: 28 October 1969
- Consecration: 13 July 1977 by Archbishop Eugene Louis D’Souza, M.S.F.S.

Personal details
- Born: 5 June 1943 Kerala, British Raj
- Died: 19 April 2018 (aged 74) New Delhi, India
- Education: Dr. Hari Singh Gour University
- Motto: DUNIYA KE LEE MASSEH

Abraham Viruthakulangara was an Indian archbishop of Nagpur. He was also the President of the Maharashtra Regional Bishops' Conference.

== Early life ==
Abraham was born on 5 June 1943 in Kerala, India. He completed his Major studies from St. Charles’ Seminary Nagpur. He completed B.A. in Hindi from Sagar University, Madhya Pradesh. He also held Baccalaureate in Theology.

== Priesthood ==
Abraham was ordained a Catholic priest on 28 October 1969.

== Episcopate ==
Abraham was appointed Bishop of Khandwa on 4 March 1977 and was ordained a bishop on 13 July 1977. He was appointed Archbishop of Nagpur, India on 17 January 1998. He was only an eight-year priest when he was ordained as a bishop and was a bishop for more than 40 years with a simple and humble life

== Death ==
On 19 April 2018 (around midnight - 1 am IST) he died from a cardiac arrest after attending a bishops' conference in New Delhi.

Catholic Church titles
Preceded by Leobard D’Souza	Archbishop of Nagpur; 1998 – 2018	Succeeded by Elias Joseph Gonsalves
