= Archdiocese of Bhopal =

Roman Catholic archdiocese in Madhya Pradesh, India

Coordinates: 23.2494°N 77.4214°E

Archdiocese of Bhopal Archidioecesis Bhopalensis भोपाल के सूबा

Location
- Country: India
- Ecclesiastical province: Bhopal

Statistics
- Area: 20,387 km^{2} (7,871 sq mi)
- Population: Total; Catholics: (as of 2012); 4,255,000; 13,214 (0.3%)
- Parishes: 35

Information
- Rite: Latin Rite
- Established: 13 September 1963
- Cathedral: Cathedral of St Francis of Assisi in Bhopal
- Patron saint: St Francis of Assisi

Current leadership
- Pope: Leo XIV
- Metropolitan Archbishop: Alangaram Arockia Sebastian Durairaj
- Bishops emeritus: Leo Cornelio, S.V.D.Archbishop Emeritus (2007-2021)

Map
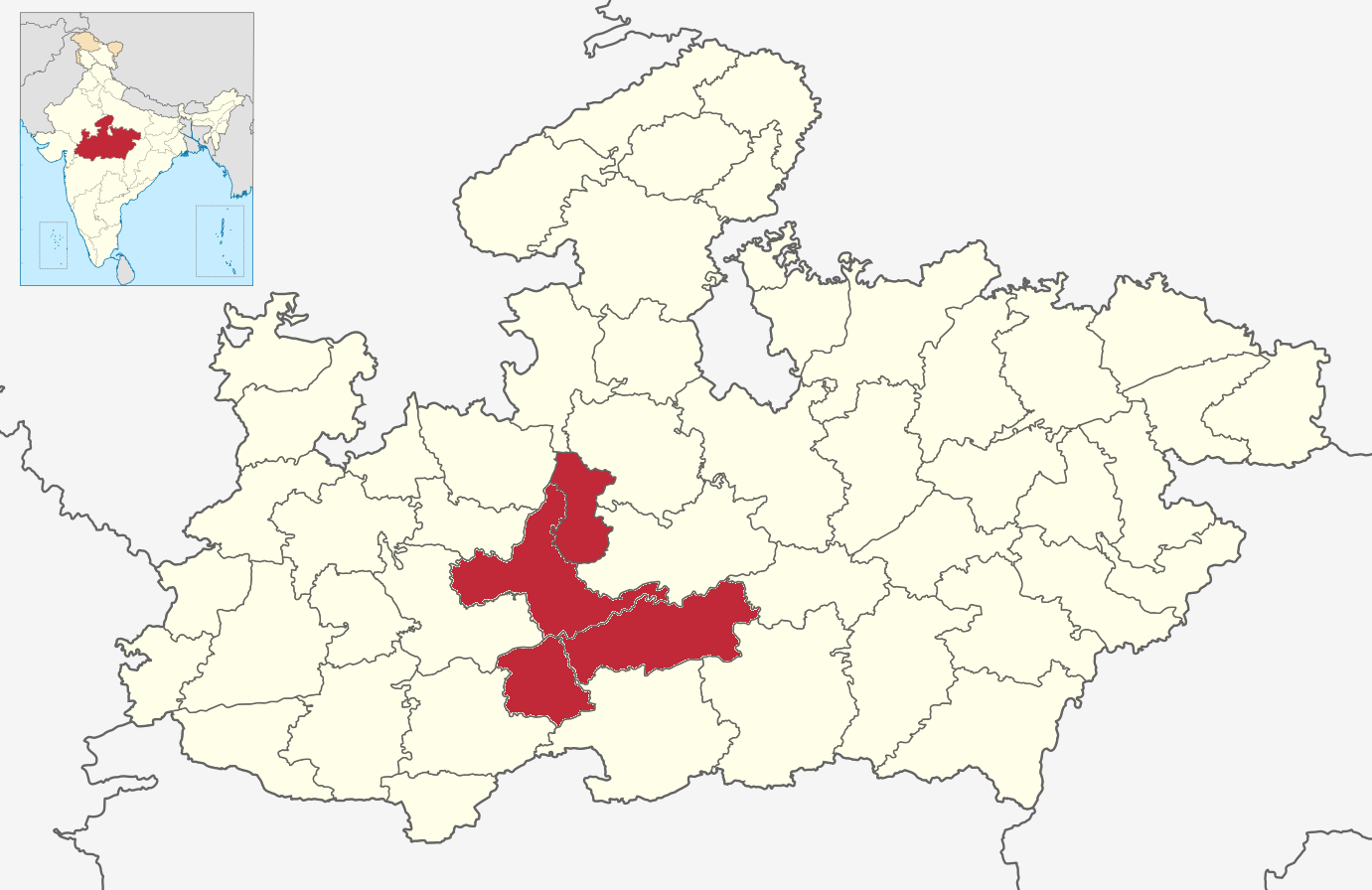

Website
- Website of the Archdiocese

The Roman Catholic Archdiocese of Bhopal (Latin: Bhopalen(sis)) is an archdiocese located in the city of Bhopal in India.

== History ==
The history of the inception, growth and blossoming of the Archdiocese of Bhopal (as it is today) is one that is replete with God's boundless mercies finding expression in their fullness supplemented by dedicated human response and endeavour.

The history of the Catholic Church goes back to the eighteenth century. It is said that in 1560 Jean Philip the Bourbon along with the brother of Henry the IVth landed in the south of India. It is said that Jean was accorded a warm welcome when he reached the palace of the King Akbar in North India. It is said that starting with Jean the family served the kind for about 400 years. They served in Sargand, Delhi, Gwalior and then in Bhopal. When there was an attack on Christians in Sargand, and about 400 Christians were killed in 1778. Salvadore Bourbon and his family fled to Gwalior and later to Bhopal in 1785, as they were not feeling safe there. Here in Bhopal they were appointed in the palace of Begham Mamola Bibi Sahiba and Salvadore was later known as Hakim Inayat Masih. Later he was appointed Army Chief and also as Chief Minister of a kingdom. This family of six is considered to be the first Christians of Bhopal. Later a few more were added from Italy and other places and in 1870, Bhopal is said to have more than 1500 Catholics around. This then fell under the Diocese of Agra and a priest used to visit Bhopal once a year for the spiritual needs of Catholics there. In 1871 the queen Isabella Bourbon gifted a four-acre land in Jehangirabad, Bhopal, for the construction of church and on 4 October (the feast of St. Francis of Assisi) the foundation stone for the new church was laid. Today it is the cathedral of the Archdiocese of Bhopal.

On 1 November 1956, the state of Madhya Pradesh was erected. On 13 September 1963, Pope Paul VI announced Bhopal as the Archdiocese and Dr. Eugene D'Souza was appointed its first shepherd. He attended the Second Vatican Council.

At present the Archdiocese of Bhopal has about 71 diocesan priests, 60 religious priests, 20 religious brothers, 550 religious sisters and 10 catechists are working in the 26 parishes and 20 mission stations. There are two colleges, one pastoral centre, two nursing colleges, 46 schools, 7 hostels, 4 social welfare centers, 4 hospitals, 5 dispensaries, 4 professional training centers, 4 schools for the physically and mentally challenged.

Most Rev. Dr. Paschal Topno SVD succeeded Archbishop D' Souza in 1994 as the new shepherd. Most Rev. Dr. Leo Cornelio SVD succeeded Dr Paschal Topno SVD in 2007 as the new shepherd, and in October 2021, Most Rev. Dr. Alangaram Arokia Sebastin Durairaj SVD became the new shepherd of the Archdiocese of Bhopal. He continues to serve as the Archbishop of Bhopal.

== Leadership ==
- Archbishops of Bhopal (Latin Rite)
  - Archbishop Alangaram Arockia Sebastian Durairaj (4 October 2021 – present)
  - Archbishop Leo Cornelio (15 June 2007 – 4 October 2021)
  - Archbishop Paschal Topno, S.J. (26 March 1994 – 15 June 2007)
  - Archbishop Eugene D’Souza, M.S.F.S. (13 September 1963 – 26 March 1994)

== Suffragan dioceses ==
- Gwalior
- Indore
- Jabalpur
- Jhabua
- Khandwa
- Sagar
- Satna
- Ujjain

== Sources ==
- GCatholic.org ^{[self-published]}
- Catholic Hierarchy ^{[self-published]}
