= Roman Catholic Diocese of Indore =

Roman Catholic diocese in Madhya Pradesh, India

Coordinates: 22.7111°N 75.8875°E

Diocese of Indore Dioecesis Indorensis इंदौर के सूबा

Location
- Country: India
- Ecclesiastical province: Bhopal
- Metropolitan: Bhopal

Statistics
- Area: 19,073 km^{2} (7,364 sq mi)
- Population: Total; Catholics: (as of 2006); 4,514,518; 35,674 (0.8%)

Information
- Denomination: Roman Catholic
- Sui iuris church: Latin Church
- Rite: Roman Rite
- Established: 3 March 1931 (As Mission Sui Iuris of Indore); 11 March 1935 (As Prefecture Apostolic of Indore); 15 May 1952 (Diocese of Indore)
- Cathedral: Cathedral of St Francis of Assisi in Indore

Current leadership
- Pope: Sede vacante
- Bishop: Chacko Thottumarickal
- Metropolitan Archbishop: Leo Cornelio
- Vicar General: Michael John Cosmas

Website
- Website of the Diocese

The Roman Catholic Diocese of Indore is a diocese of the Roman Catholic Church based in Indore, Madhya Pradesh, India. Founded in 1952 and spread over 3 civil districts of western Madhya Pradesh, it serves an area of 19,073 km².

The bishop of the diocese is Chacko Thottumarickal, S.V.D., born 7 January 1949. He was appointed bishop on 27 March 2002.

== List of prelates of Indore ==
Ecclesiastical superior

- Peter Janser (1931−1935)

Prefects apostolic

- Peter Janser (1935−1945)
- Hermann Westermann (1948−1951)

Bishops

- Frans Simons (1952–1971)
- George M. Anathil (1972−2008)
- Chacko Thottumarickal (since 24 October 2008)

== History ==
- 1931 - Established as mission sui iuris
- 1935 - Elevated as apostolic prefecture
- 1952 - Elevated as diocese

== Saints and causes for canonisation ==
- Bl. Rani Maria Vattalil
