= Americans United for Separation of Church and State =

American nonprofit organization

- Founded: January 11, 1948; 78 years ago
- Founders: Charles Clayton Morrison, Glenn L. Archer, Edwin McNeill Poteat, G. Bromley Oxnam, Joseph Martin Dawson
- Tax ID no.: 53-0184647
- Legal status: 501(c)(3) nonprofit organization
- Purpose: To preserve the constitutional principle of church-state separation as the only way to ensure religious freedom for all Americans.
- Headquarters: 1310 L Street NW, Suite 200, Washington, D.C. 20005
- Coordinates: 38.9035°N 77.0304°W
- Region served: United States
- Method: Litigation, education
- President, CEO: Rachel Laser
- Revenue: $13.7 million (2024)
- Expenses: $13.4 million (2024)
- Website: www.au.org
- Formerly called: Protestants and Other Americans United for Separation of Church and State

Americans United for Separation of Church and State (Americans United or AU for short) is a 501(c)(3) nonprofit organization that advocates for the disassociation of religion and religious organizations from government. The separation of church and state in the United States is commonly interpreted to be provided in the Establishment Clause of the First Amendment to the United States Constitution, which states "Congress shall make no law respecting an establishment of religion..."

== Organization ==
Americans United describes itself as officially non-sectarian and non-partisan. According to The Praeger Handbook of Religion and Education in the United States "It includes members from a broad religious, and non-religious, spectrum, including Christians, Jews, Muslims, Buddhists, Hindus, and atheists." Its national headquarters are in Washington, D.C. Its former executive director, Barry W. Lynn, is an ordained minister in the United Church of Christ, as well as an attorney involved with civil liberties issues.

== History ==
Americans United for Separation of Church and State was founded on January 11, 1948, as Protestants and Other Americans United for Separation of Church and State (POAU) by a coalition of religious, educational and civic leaders. It was made in response to proposals pending in the U.S. Congress to extend government aid to private religious schools, particularly Catholic parochial schools, which was at the time, and continues to be, the largest system of private schools in the United States. They believed that government support for religious education would violate church-state separation and force taxpayers to subsidize sectarian education. The decision was made to form a national organization to promote and defend this point of view. It successfully protested against the appointment of a U.S. Ambassador to the Vatican. They denounced the Catholic Church for disdaining democracy in the U.S. and worldwide.

Officially incorporated on January 29, 1948, the organization aimed to influence political leaders, and began publishing Church & State magazine in 1952 and other materials in support of church-state separation to educate the general public.

Its original founding members were Charles Clayton Morrison, Glenn L. Archer, Edwin McNeill Poteat, G. Bromley Oxnam, and Joseph Martin Dawson.

== Notable work ==
Americans United was one of three national organizations that opposed the teaching of intelligent design in Dover, Pennsylvania, public schools. A federal judge struck down the policy in December 2005 (see Kitzmiller v. Dover). AU supports the right for gays and lesbians to marry, and opposes laws that would permit government officials, such as county clerks, from invoking religious freedom when refusing to issue such marriage licenses. AU started a "Protect Thy Neighbor" project to oppose such conscience legislation.

Americans United represented residents of Greece, New York, who opposed that town's practice of opening its council meetings with mostly Christian prayers. AU lost the case, Town of Greece v. Galloway, when the U.S. Supreme Court held that legislative prayers do not violate the Establishment Clause of the First Amendment. After the decision was issued, Americans United launched Operation Inclusion to advocate for making prayers "inclusive".

Americans United has worked to uphold the federal law that bars non-profit groups, including houses of worship, from intervening in partisan politics. In 1992, the group reported a New York church, the Church at Pierce Creek, to the Internal Revenue Service (IRS) after the church ran newspaper ads telling people not to vote for Bill Clinton. The IRS subsequently stripped the church of its 501(c)(3) determination letter. After the church filed suit in federal court to get the determination letter back, the court noted, "because of the unique treatment churches receive under the Internal Revenue Code, the impact of the revocation is likely to be more symbolic than substantial .... Contributions will remain tax deductible as long as the donors are able to establish that the Church meets the requirements of section 501(c)(3)." Churches do not need a tax-exempt determination letter to receive all of the benefits of tax-exempt status.

== Reception by Catholic Church ==
In its first years, a main focus of AU's activity was opposition to the political activities of the Catholic Church and was thus seen by critics as a Protestant-based anti-Catholic organization. AU's executive director for 25 years, Barry W. Lynn, is a critic of religious fundamentalism on the Christian right and described himself as a member of the Christian left.

Professor Daniel Dreisbach argues:

In the mid-20th century, the rhetoric of separation was revived and ultimately constitutionalized by anti-Catholic elites, such as ... Protestants and other Americans United for the Separation of Church and State ... who feared the influence and wealth of the Catholic Church and perceived parochial education as a threat to public schools and democratic values.

== See also ==
- Freedom from Religion Foundation
- James C. Corman (1920–2000), California politician, president of Americans United
- Paul Blanshard (1892–1980), editor, lawyer, special counsel and spokesman for Americans United; author of American Freedom and Catholic Power
