= Ada Watterson Yerkes =

American biologist (1873–1963)

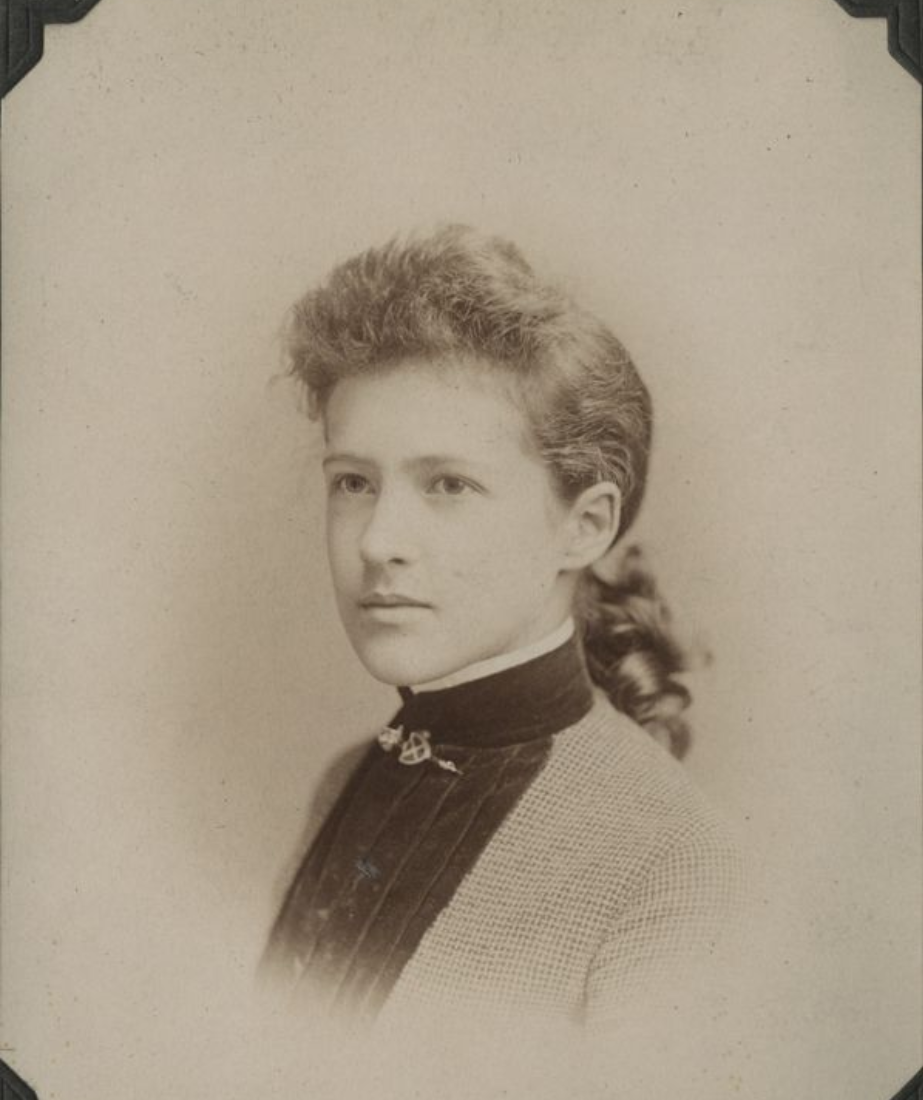
- Born: Ada Watterson; November 6, 1873; Cleveland, Ohio, U.S.
- Died: October 16, 1963 (aged 89); New Haven, Connecticut
- Occupation: Biologist
- Spouse: Robert Yerkes
- Children: 2, including Roberta Yerkes Blanshard
- Relatives: Brand Blanshard (son-in-law)

Ada Watterson Yerkes (November 6, 1873 – October 16, 1963) was an American biologist. Although she was trained as a botanist, she is best known for her work in primatology, with her husband, psychologist Robert Yerkes.

== Early life and education ==
Watterson was born in Cleveland, Ohio, the daughter of Robert Frank Watterson and Carrie Theresa Norton Watterson. Her ancestors were among the early white settlers in the Western Reserve section of Ohio. Her father was an American Civil War veteran who died in 1879. She graduated from Barnard College in 1898, and earned a master's degree from Columbia University in 1900. She took a summer course at Cold Spring Harbor Laboratory.

== Career ==
Watterson taught biology at Barnard College from 1899 to 1902, and tutored biology students at Teachers College, Columbia University from 1902 to 1905. Watterson married Robert Yerkes in 1905. Their partnership was both professional and personal; "from 1905, my professional biography is no longer mine alone," he wrote in 1929. She conducted and published her own research after marriage, and worked with her husband on several major projects, especially their co-authored book, The Great Apes: A Study of Anthropoid Life (1929). In the 1930s she planned the landscaping at the Yale Laboratory of Primate Biology in Florida.

== Publications ==
- "The Effect of Chemical Irritation on the Respiration of Fungi" (1904)
- "Modifiability of behavior in Hydroides dianthus V" (1906)
- "Mind in Plants" (1914)
- "Comparison of the behavior of stock and inbred albino rats" (1916)
- "Individuality, Temperament, and Genius in Animals" (1917, with Robert M. Yerkes)
- The Great Apes: A Study of Anthropoid Life (1929, with Robert M. Yerkes)
- "Experiments with an Infant Chimpanzee" (1935)
- "Nature and conditions of avoidance (fear) response in chimpanzee" (1936, with Robert M. Yerkes)
- Family Matters (1941, a history of her family)

== Personal life ==
She and Robert Yerkes had two children, Roberta and David. Her husband died in 1956, and she died in 1963, at the age of 89, in New Haven, Connecticut. The Ada Watterson Yerkes Family Papers are in the collection of the Western Reserve Historical Society. The Robert M. Yerkes and Ada Watterson Yerkes Papers are at the Whitney Library of the New Haven Museum and Historical Society. Robert Yerkes' papers at Yale University also contain her diaries and other relevant materials.
