= Will Maslow =

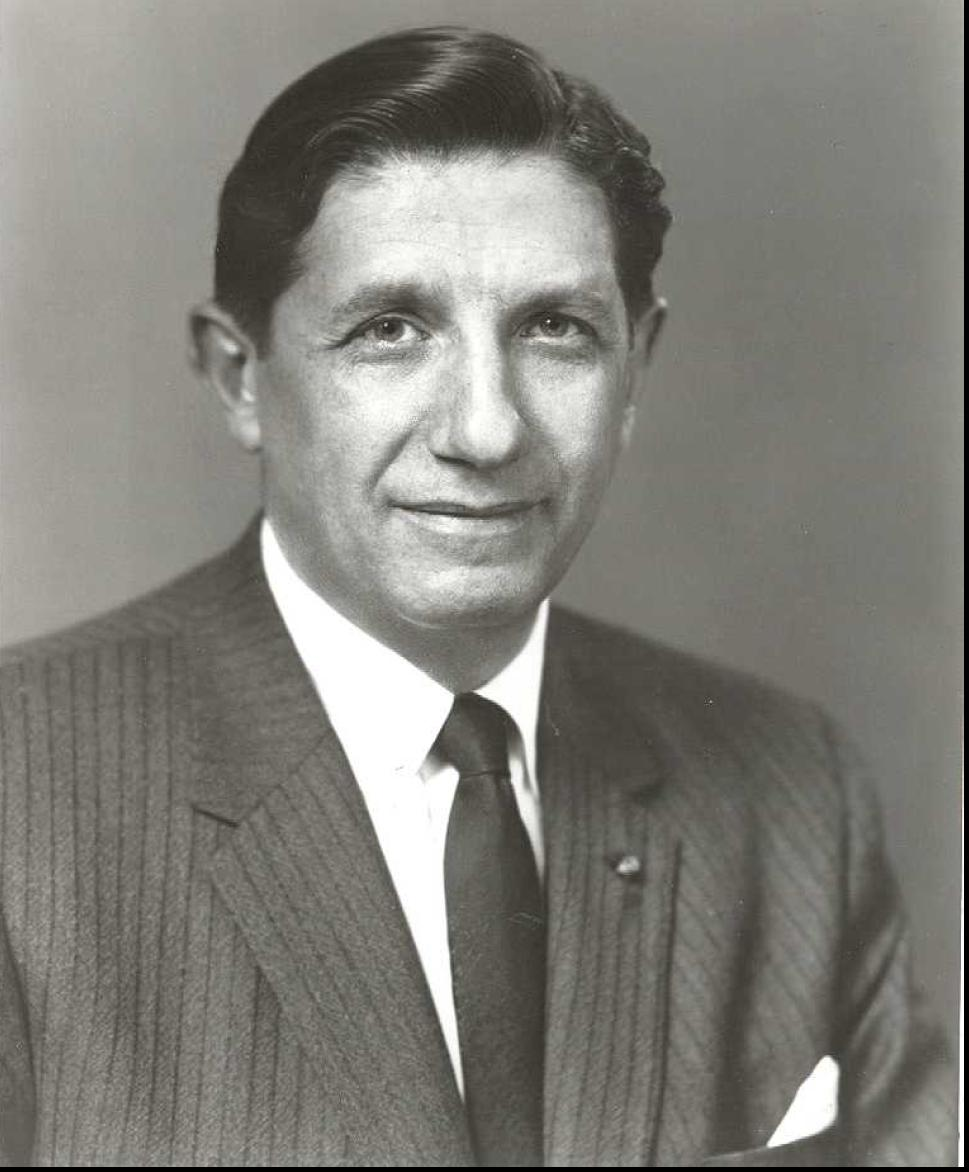
- Maslow in the 1940s
- Born: September 27, 1907; Kiev, Russian Empire
- Died: February 23, 2007 (aged 99)
- Occupation: Civil rights lawyer
- Organization: American Jewish Congress
- Relatives: Abraham Maslow (cousin)

Will Maslow (September 27, 1907 – February 23, 2007) was an American lawyer and civil rights leader who fought for "full equality in a free society" for Jews, blacks, and other minorities at positions he held in government and as an executive of the American Jewish Congress.

== Early life and education ==
Born in Kyiv, Russian Empire, Maslow came to the United States with his parents Raeesa and Saul Maslow (family name Masliankin) in 1911. He graduated from Boys High School (Brooklyn), where his best friend was his cousin Abraham Maslow, who later became a pioneer in humanistic psychology. A Boys High physics teacher introduced the cousins to Upton Sinclair's books, which promoted concern for the disadvantaged and a belief that managing the labor/capital relationship equitably would be critical to the success of American democracy. The teenaged cousins embraced democratic socialist ideals, such as those espoused by Eugene Debs, Norman Thomas, and the Nation magazine. Will Maslow remained a supporter of Norman Thomas's Socialist Party until early in 1934 when he joined Paul Blanshard, a former active Socialist who had turned "independent progressive," to work in Mayor La Guardia's Republican-Fusion administration (see below).

Maslow won a New York State Regents Scholarship for academic excellence to Cornell University. At Cornell, he helped revive and became president of the Cornell Liberal Club. According to Cornell historian Morris Bishop: "The Cornell Liberal Club was organized by a group of students and faculty in 1929. It opposed the condemnation of Sacco and Vanzetti, the brutal treatment of striking miners, the ban on working foreign students, and compulsory military training at Cornell." In 1928, Maslow competed for an editorial position at The Cornell Daily Sun and was named a senior associate editor responsible for editorials. He elected to take his senior year in Cornell Law School, where he completed the first-year curriculum. Maslow graduated Cornell with an A.B. degree in 1929.

Following Cornell graduation, Maslow enrolled in Columbia University Law School, where he completed his law degree in 1931. During Maslow's two years at Columbia, "Legal Realism," which would influence Maslow's later writings, had become an established approach to law taught by many Columbia law professors. No longer on scholarship, during law school Maslow worked part-time as a reporter for The New York Times.

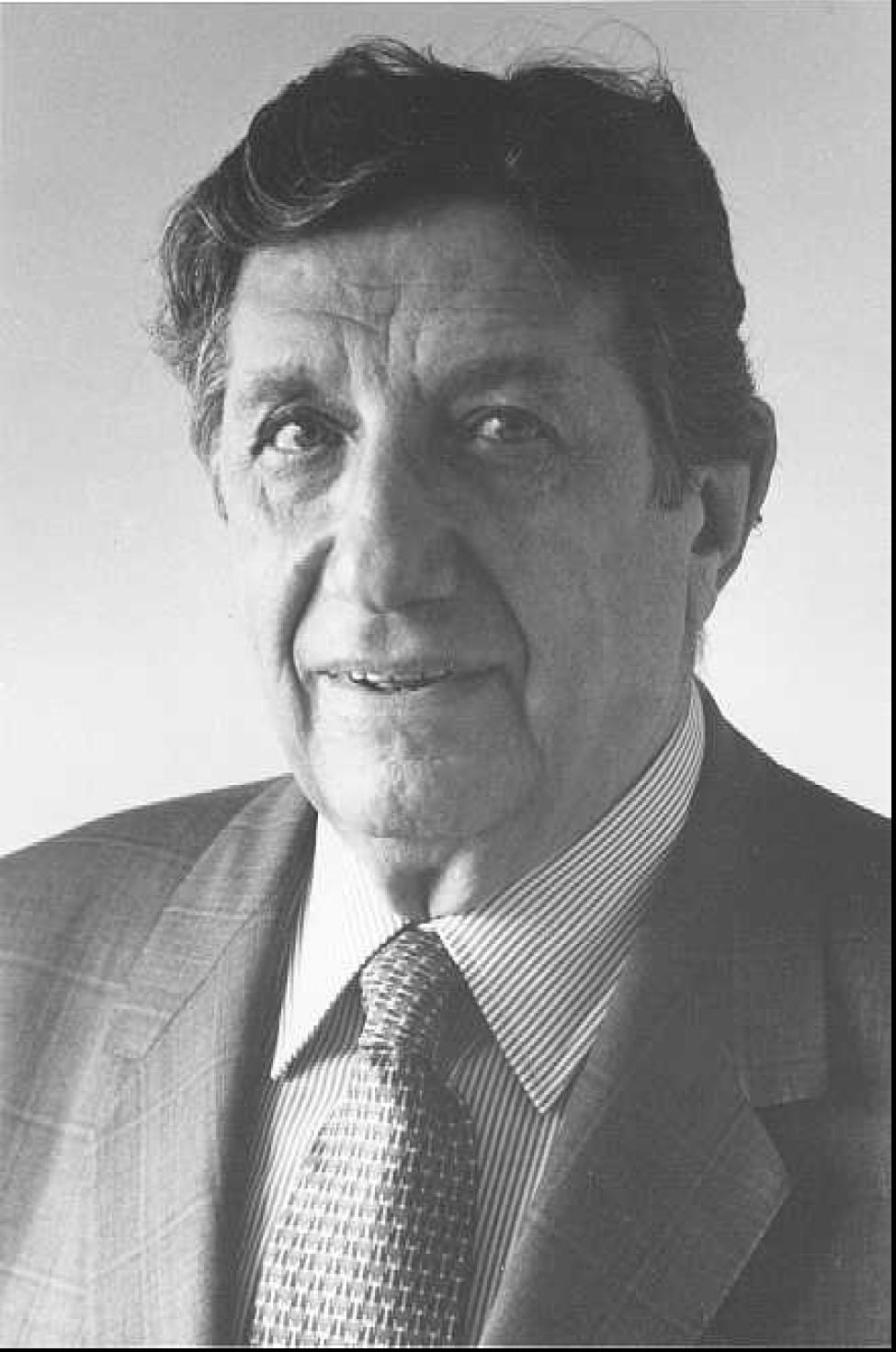
Maslow in the late 1960s

== Early career ==
After graduation he was employed by Arthur Garfield Hays on special assignment to work on the highly contested will case of the last known heir of the Wendel real estate fortune, Ella Wendel. The settlement on behalf of Hays's claimants earned the firm $1.3 million.

In 1934 Maslow joined the New York City Department of Investigation and Accounts in the administration of the recently elected mayor, Fiorello La Guardia. The agency was headed by commissioner Paul Blanshard, who had been a key figure in the City Affairs Committee, formed by concerned citizens to rid New York City of municipal corruption. Blanshard's new municipal agency was tasked by La Guardia to continue the work of rooting out corruption. Hired as an examiner and soon promoted to associate counsel, Maslow was assigned a large and diverse set of high-profile cases ranging from defiant "tin box" racketeers, electric and gas utility corruption, consumer fraud protection, and stalemated labor-management conflicts.

== National Labor Relations Board (NLRB) ==
Maslow joined NLRB as a trial attorney in New York City soon after the U.S. Supreme Court's decision to affirm the NLRB's constitutionality. The NLRB had been created by the National Labor Relations Act of 1935, also known as the "Wagner Act," to enforce the right of workers to create their own unions and collectively bargain with employers. In 1941, Maslow was promoted to administrative law judge, an NLRB staff position responsible for docketing, presiding over, and deciding unfair labor practice cases.

== Fair Employment Practices Committee (FEPC) ==
The Fair Employment Practices Committee (FEPC) was established by executive order as a wartime measure in 1941 by President Franklin D. Roosevelt at the urgent request of labor leader and civil rights activist A. Philip Randolph (1889–1979) that the federal government ban employment discrimination by defense contractors. Challenged from the outset by many who strenuously opposed its mission, and by internal disagreements over responsibilities and staffing, FEPC was reorganized in May 1943. The new chairman, Malcolm H. Ross, asked Will Maslow, still at NLRB, to draft an executive order that would strengthen the FEPC and increase its funding. Ross submitted the draft to Attorney General Francis Biddle, which became EO 9346, signed by President Roosevelt on May 27, 1943.

Maslow joined the staff of FEPC in July 1943 as Director of Field Operations. Maslow and deputy director of Field Operations Clarence Mitchell Jr. established and managed twelve regional offices. Half of the field offices were headed by blacks, and offices were ethnically and racially mixed. Commenting on the FEPC's staffing, Merl E. Reed, a leading historian of the FEPC, observed that "the FEPC became the first federal agency in history not only to have blacks in policy-making positions but to have black staff appointees in Washington, D.C., and in the field often directing whites and other blacks." Reed described Maslow as "bright, intense, and aggressive, [who] ran a tight operation, laying down strict and unambiguous field instructions for the regional directors and investigators to follow."

Maslow resigned his position when a coalition of southern Democrats and northern pro-business Republicans, opposed to anti-discrimination legislation and government regulation of business, declined to fund the FEPC and filibustered against passage of a legislated permanent FEPC. After Maslow left the FEPC and was named director of the American Jewish Congress's Commission on Law and Social Action, he continued to champion the elimination of unfair employment discrimination affecting blacks, Mexican-Americans, Jews, and other minorities, by state and federal law.

== American Jewish Congress (AJCongress) ==
In August 1945, Maslow returned to New York to become general counsel of the American Jewish Congress ("AJCongress"), and director of AJCongress's newly established Commission on Law and Social Action ("CLSA"). CLSA's mission was to use law, legislation, friend-of-the court briefs, and community political pressure to address, prohibit, and eliminate discrimination not only of Jews but of all American minorities. Maslow developed, launched, and directed CLSA based on an innovative model for managing intergroup relations developed by consulting attorney Alexander H. Pekelis (1902–1946).

Maslow and his staff of CLSA lawyers, were "committed to the use of law as a means for progressive social change." Under Maslow's direction (1945–1957), CLSA quickly became one of the nation's top three private agencies fighting for civil rights and liberties. They "served as the legal architects and political strategists of a federated campaign to pass legislation prohibiting discrimination--not only in employment but also in higher education, housing, and public accommodations." CLSA "earned a reputation as the Jewish community's most aggressive advocate of liberal causes."

He was executive director of AJCongress from 1960 until 1972. He continued to serve as general counsel of the agency until he retired in 1984. In retirement, he continued writing briefs and papers as a volunteer through the late 1990s.Under his counsel and leadership, AJCongress was often in the courts challenging discrimination and advocating civil rights. Maslow created the AJCongress' Commission on Law and Social Action and with it, filed a discrimination suit against Columbia University, demanding that it change its discriminatory admissions quotas. He also filed a suite against Stuyvesant Town Housing Co. because of its racial policies against black tenants.

In 1947, he fought for strict adherence to the Ives-Quinn Act which forbade discrimination in employment, charging that job agencies were disregarding this law en masse, 88% in fact. He negotiated with Gertz, a department store in Jamaica, Queens, to hire blacks for the first time.
