= Roberta Yerkes Blanshard =

American editor

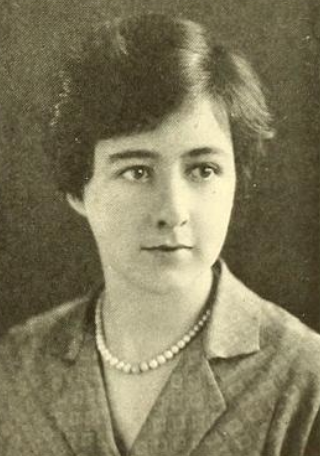
- Roberta Yerkes (later Blanshard), from the 1929 yearbook of Bryn Mawr College
- Born: Roberta Watterson Yerkes; September 19, 1907; Cambridge, Massachusetts, U.S.
- Died: December 9, 2001 (age 94); Hamden, Connecticut, U.S.
- Occupation: Editor
- Spouse: Brand Blanshard
- Parent(s): Robert M. Yerkes; Ada Watterson Yerkes
- Relatives: Paul Blanshard (brother-in-law)

Roberta Watterson Yerkes Blanshard (September 19, 1907 – December 9, 2001) was an American editor.

== Early life and education ==
Yerkes was born in Cambridge, Massachusetts, the daughter of Robert Mearns Yerkes and Ada Watterson Yerkes. Her father was a psychologist, and her mother was a biologist; both studied primates. Her younger brother David Norton Yerkes was a noted architect. Both Yerkes children remembered living with chimpanzees, their father's research subjects, as household pets. She also traveled in Europe and Africa with her father, in his work to study chimpanzees. She graduated from Bryn Mawr College in 1929.

== Career ==
Blanshard worked in the editorial department of Yale University Press from 1929 to 1959. She was one of the editors who rejected the manuscript of her father's autobiography, saying later that it "did not seem to us to present a balanced account" of his life and work.

Blanshard was close to her neighbor, former Radcliffe College president Ada Comstock Notestein; they were in a study club together, and Yerkes helped Notestein manage her affairs in widowhood. Yerkes and her brother attended the dedication of the Yerkes Primate Research Center at Emory University in 1965.

== Publications ==
- Alexandra Tolstoy, I Worked for the Soviets (1934, edited and co-translated by Yerkes)
- "Home Life with Chimpanzees: Part 2" (1977)

== Personal life ==
Yerkes married philosopher and retired Yale professor Brand Blanshard, in 1969, as his second wife. Her husband died in 1987, and she died in 2001, at the age of 94, in Hamden, Connecticut. Her papers are in the archives at Yale University Library, as are the papers of her husband and her father.
