= Rosalía Abreu =

Cuban naturalist (1862–1930)

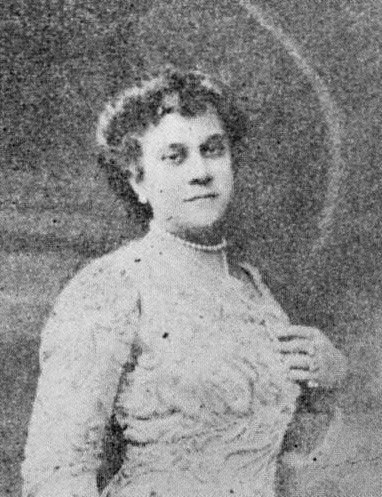
- Abreu in 1905
- Born: 15 January 1862; Santa Clara, Captaincy General of Cuba
- Died: 3 November 1930 (aged 68); Havana, Republic of Cuba
- Occupations: Philanthropist; primate-keeper
- Known for: Breeding the first chimpanzee in captivity

Rosalía Abreu (15 January 1862 – 3 November 1930) was a Cuban philanthropist and animal-keeper who was the first person to successfully breed chimpanzees in captivity. In 1926, she initially supported research proposed by Ilya Ivanov to breed a humanzee, although she later retracted the decision to involve her primates in the experiment. American eugenicist Robert Yerkes worked with Abreu and based some of his research on developments she had made in primate care and purchased many of her primates.

== Early life ==
Abreu was born on 15 January 1862 to a wealthy family in Villa Clara Province, Cuba. Her father was a plantation owner named Pedro Nolasco González Abreu y Jimenes. She had two sisters: Marta Abreu and Rosa Contreras. Her father died in 1873, and her mother moved to the US with her younger daughters, where Rosalía attended Edenhall School in Torresdale, Pennsylvania. She later travelled to France where she married a Cuban doctor, Domingo Sanchez Toledo, in 1883; they had five children together. She returned to Cuba in 1899, where she lived at an extensive property, Las Delicias, inherited from her parents and established what was then the world's largest collection of primates there.

== Primatology ==
The collection included over 200 primates, from over forty species, some of whom were forced to wear clothes and live in the house with Abreu. She purchased her first primate, a female macaque, between 1892 and 1897, whilst living in France. Her first chimpanzee, Chimpita, was acquired in 1902. However others were kept in large and airy cages, kept warm and fed vegetarian diets. Abreu also recognised the importance of social interaction for primates, and enabled them to spend time with one another. In 1906 Abreu established the world's first purpose-built primate nursery.

On 27 April 1915, Abreu became the first person in the world to breed chimpanzees in captivity, following the birth of Anumá. The parents were Jimmy and Cucusa and a report of the birth was published by the anthropologist Louis Montané, a professor at the University of Cuba. Other chimpanzees owned by Abreu included: Jim (died 1935 in Philadelphia Zoological Garden), Mona (the first chimpanzee mother to give birth to twins in captivity), Bula, and Gua. In 1916 Isadora Duncan visited the collection and commented on its size. Whilst most notable for her work with chimpanzees, orangutans also featured in Abreu's collection, including Guas and Guarina who later lived at Philadelphia Zoo.

Welcoming to visitors and to researchers, Abreu hosted the psychologist Robert Yerkes in Cuba in 1924, where he recorded many of the principles behind the care for the animals in her collection. He was accompanied on this research trip by Harold C. Bingham, Josephine Ball and Prince Chim, a chimpanzee. Abreu's work forms the basis for Yerkes' book on primatology entitled Almost Human.

In 1926, Abreu was approached by the Russian scientist Ilya Ivanov, who enquired whether any of Abreu's male chimpanzees would be willing to inseminate a female human volunteer in order to breed a human-ape hybrid. Initially Abreu agreed to supply an animal for the 'experiment'; however, following threats from the Ku Klux Klan she retracted her permission.

== Legacy ==
Abreu died at her estate of Villa Palatino on 3 November 1930. At the time of her death, only seven chimpanzees had been bred in captivity, including four on her estate. After her death, Abreu's son Pierre established the Rosalia Abreu Memorial Fund at Yale Laboratories of Primate Biology (YLPB), which supported research publication. Several of her chimpanzees were transferred to Yerkes' laboratory after Abreu's death. Another legacy from her estate was the foundation of the Industrial Technical School for Women of Rosalia Abreu's Foundation, which was established in 1934.
