= Harold Clyde Bingham =

American psychologist and primatologist

- Born: January 21, 1888; Rowan, Iowa
- Died: August 26, 1964 (aged 76); Laconia, New Hampshire
- Education: Ellsworth College; MA, Harvard University; Doctorate, Johns Hopkins University
- Occupations: Psychologist, primatologist

Harold Clyde Bingham (January 21, 1888 – August 26, 1964) was an American psychologist and primatologist. He spent his early career as a psychology professor, interrupting this to join the United States Army during World War I. He joined the faculty of Yale University in 1925 and studied under the supervision of Robert Yerkes. Yerkes, a psychology professor, had an interest in primates, and Bingham also entered this field. He led a 1929-30 expedition to the Belgian Congo to study gorillas in the wild. Though hampered by the size of the expedition, Bingham managed to get close to several troops of the animals and record details of their behavior. Upon his return to the United States he joined the Civil Works Administration and the Emergency Relief Administration. Bingham later worked with the National Youth Administration and, during World War II, rejoined the US Army. After the war Bingham served as a senior psychologist with the Veterans Administration.

== Early life and career ==
Harold Clyde Bingham was born in Rowan, Iowa, on January 21, 1888. He graduated from Ellsworth College in 1910 and afterwards received a Master of Arts degree from Harvard University and a doctorate from Johns Hopkins University. Bingham spent a period as professor of education and psychology and track and baseball coach at Ellsworth. Bingham joined the U.S. Army during World War I.

In 1920 Bingham became a member of the Research Information Service of the National Research Council. In 1924 he accompanied Josephine Ball, Robert Yerkes and Chim (a male bonobo) on a visit to Rosalía Abreu in Cuba. Abreu had a very extensive colony of many sorts of primates and had succeeded with captive breeding of chimpanzees. In 1925 Bingham joined the faculty of Wesleyan University as a research associate and associate professor of psychology. He took up the same roles at Yale University in 1925 and held them until 1930. While at Yale, Bingham was a postdoctoral student of Robert Yerkes, who had an interest in human and primate intelligence. Bingham wrote Sex Development in Apes in 1928.

== Congo expedition ==
In 1929 Bingham was selected as director of a joint Yale and Carnegie Institution for Science expedition to study the mountain gorillas of the Belgian Congo, the first planned study of the species in their natural environment. To prepare, he read the reports of the explorations of Carl Akeley and visited Rosalía Abreu's primate collection in Cuba. Bingham's wife, Lucille, accompanied him on the expedition, which left the United States later in 1929.

Bingham's expedition focused on the Albert National Park. In common with many early expeditions, the number of porters accompanying the group hampered the study by scaring away the gorillas. Bingham did, however succeed in trailing several different troops of gorillas, including one that he stayed with for 100 hours. Bingham reported that the gorillas were largely terrestrial, though did occasionally climb trees, and that they avoided water as a rule but did cross small streams. He noted that they moved around constantly to forage for food and slept only one night in each nest. Bingham did not observe any use of sticks as tools by the animals, which had been reported in captivity.

Bingham drew up a list of food the gorillas ate and the vocalizations they used. The expedition ended in 1930, and he wrote a book Gorillas in a Native Habitat in 1932.

== Later life ==
In 1931 Bingham was appointed a supervisor of research and director of education at the Civil Works Administration and the Emergency Relief Administration in New Hampshire. They were New Deal works programs established by Franklin D. Roosevelt. In 1934 he transferred to the National Youth Administration as a director. Bingham held this position until 1941 when he rejoined the army for World War II. He joined the Veterans Administration as a senior psychologist in Washington, D.C., in 1946 and also worked as a senior adviser and guidance officer, before his retirement in 1955.

Bingham was a member of the American Association for the Advancement of Science and a fellow of the American Psychological Association. He died in Laconia, New Hampshire, on August 26, 1964.
