= Epistemological idealism =

Belief that reality or access to it is shaped by the mind

Epistemological idealism is a subjectivist position in epistemology that holds that what one knows about an object exists only in one's mind. It is opposed to epistemological realism.

== Overview ==
Epistemological idealism suggests that everything we experience and know is of a mental nature—sense data in philosophical jargon. Although it is sometimes employed to argue in favor of metaphysical idealism, in principle epistemological idealism makes no claim about whether sense data are grounded in reality. As such, it is a container for both indirect realism and idealism. This is the version of epistemological idealism which interested Ludwig Boltzmann; it had roots in the positivism of Ernst Mach and Gustav Kirchhoff plus a number of aspects of the Kantianism or neo-Kantianism of Hermann von Helmholtz and Heinrich Hertz.

A contemporary representative of epistemological idealism is Brand Blanshard.
