= Glenn L. Archer =

American activist

Glenn L. Archer (1906–2002) was one of the founders and the first Executive Director of Americans United for Separation of Church and State, formerly known as Protestants and Other Americans United for Separation of Church and State.

In its first years, a main focus of AU's activity was opposition to the political agenda of the Roman Catholic Church and it was seen by critics as an anti-Catholic organization. It was under Archer's tutelage that the Roman Catholic hierarchy was dubbed in 1949 as being more dangerous and clever than communism.

He petitioned the FCC to deny TV licenses to Jesuits because they were an alien organization. He also demanded that Cardinals in the Catholic Church have their citizenship revoked. Furthermore, he asked the House Un-American Activities Committee to investigate the intentions, scope and achievements of Vatican espionage in the United States, charging that the Catholic clergy had learned American secrets hardly anyone except the president knows.

In 1960, Archer entered into a dialog with presidential candidate John F. Kennedy to assess his views on church-state relations. In a letter to Archer, Kennedy assured him of his support for the First Amendment. Kennedy later responded to concerns about his faith in his famous speech before the Greater Houston Ministerial Association, delivered September 12, 1960 at the Rice Hotel in Houston Texas. In his memoir The Dream Lives On, Archer praised Kennedy's views on Church-State separation, saying they were the best of any president since Thomas Jefferson.
