= Brand Blanshard =

American philosopher (1892–1987)

- Blanshard in 1964
- Born: Percy Brand Blanshard; August 27, 1892; Fredericksburg, Ohio, U.S.
- Died: November 19, 1987 (aged 95); New Haven, Connecticut, U.S.
- Relatives: Paul Blanshard (brother)

Education
- Education: University of Michigan; Merton College, Oxford
- Doctoral advisor: C. I. Lewis
- Other advisors: H. H. Joachim; H. W. B. Joseph

Philosophical work
- Era: 20th-century philosophy
- Region: Western philosophy
- School: American rationalism American idealism Epistemological idealism Epistemic coherentism
- Doctoral students: John Lachs
- Main interests: Epistemology; Ethics; Metaphilosophy; Philosophy of psychology Philosophy of religion Philosophy of education
- Notable ideas: Contemporary formulation of the coherence theory of truth

Percy Brand Blanshard (/ˈblænʃərd/ BLAN-shərd; August 27, 1892 – November 19, 1987) was an American philosopher known primarily for his defense of rationalism and idealism.

== Biography ==
Brand Blanshard was born August 27, 1892, in Fredericksburg, Ohio. His parents were Francis, a Congregational minister, and Emily Coulter Blanshard, Canadians who met in high school in Weston, Ontario. The freethinker and sometime The Nation editor Paul Beecher Blanshard was his fraternal twin. During a visit to Toronto in 1893, their mother Emily fell down stairs while holding a kerosene lamp. She died of burns the next day. The Rev. Mr. Blanshard brought his sons to Grand Rapids, Michigan, for maternal care by his mother, Orminda Adams Blanshard, widow of Methodist clergyman Shem Blanshard. Francis briefly left them in her care to pastor a church in Helena, Montana. In 1899 the four moved south to Edinburg Township, Ohio. Upon being diagnosed with tuberculosis, Francis was advised to seek the drier climate of the American West. In 1902, Francis Blanshard bade his mother and sons goodbye. The family moved northwest to Bay View, Michigan, while Francis moved alone to Albuquerque, New Mexico, where, in 1904, he died, alone in a tent.

Mrs. Orminda Blanshard raised her grandsons on an annual pension of $250 from the Methodist church while the boys washed dishes at a restaurant. Realizing their need for good education, the family relocated to Detroit in 1908 so the boys could graduate from the well-known Central High School. Soon both were at the top of their class, joined the debating team, and Brand was made class Poet. Many years later, Bertrand Russell was to express surprise at the quality of Brand's poetry. Brand also excelled at baseball.

In 1910 the Blanshard brothers entered the University of Michigan, whose annual tuition was only $30 for state residents. Brand discovered philosophy while majoring in classics. After three years at Michigan, he obtained a Rhodes Scholarship to study at Merton College, Oxford, where he studied under H. W. B. Joseph, who greatly influenced him, and met F. H. Bradley and T. S. Eliot. Upon the outbreak of World War I, he interrupted his studies and joined the British Army YMCA, which sent him to Bombay and Amhara, where he witnessed poverty and the horrors of war at first hand. German submarine warfare forced him to return to the US via Japan. Fate reunited the Blanshard twins at Columbia University where Paul was studying the new field of Sociology. The brothers participated in a project run by their shared mentor and friend, John Dewey. On this project they met Frances Bradshaw of Smith College - see below. Brand obtained his M.A., studying under W.P. Montague. From Columbia, he went straight into the US Army, serving in France. Once demobilized, he returned to Oxford to complete his BA (Hons) and then earned his doctorate at Harvard under Clarence Irving Lewis.

Blanshard during his time in Swarthmore College, 1930

After a short teaching stint at Michigan, he taught at Swarthmore College from 1925 to 1944. He spent the remainder of his career at Yale University until his retirement in 1961. At Yale, he served as chairman of the Department of Philosophy for many years. He was elected to the American Academy of Arts and Sciences in 1946 and the American Philosophical Society in 1948. In 1952, he delivered the Gifford Lectures in Scotland. In 1955 he was elected as an Honorary Fellow of Merton College.

In 1918, Blanshard married Frances Bradshaw, who would become dean of women at Swarthmore. It came as a great blow to him when Frances died in 1966. He completed her book Frank Aydelotte of Swarthmore, publishing it in 1970. In 1969, after what he later described as "loneliness, failing health, and failing motives," he married Roberta Yerkes, a daughter of his Yale colleague Robert M. Yerkes. Brand Blanshard died in 1987 at the age of 95, in New Haven, Connecticut.

== Philosophical work ==
The Philosophy of Brand Blanshard, Library of Living Philosophers (1980), Paul Schilpp (ed.)

Blanshard was a rationalist who espoused and defended a strong conception of reason during a century when reason came under attack in philosophy and psychology alike. He was also generally regarded as one of the last absolute idealists because he was strongly influenced by British idealism (especially F.H. Bradley and Bernard Bosanquet). However, this influence was felt primarily in his views concerning logic, values, and epistemology. He departed from absolute idealism in many respects, so much so that he explicitly disavowed being an idealist in an essay in The Philosophy of Brand Blanshard (in his reply to Charles Hartshorne). Blanshard sharply distinguished epistemological idealism (the position that all objects of direct experience exist only in consciousness) from ontological idealism (the position that the world in itself is mental, or made of mind-stuff). While he accepted epistemological idealism, he wasn't prepared to take the extra step to ontological idealism, unlike Berkeley, Hegel, Royce, or Bosanquet. Rather, he thought it all but certain that the material world exists independently of mind and rejected the basic dictum of Berkeleian ontological idealism, that esse est percipi (to be is to be perceived).

Strongly critical of positivism, logical atomism, pragmatism, and most varieties of empiricism, he held that the universe consists of an Absolute in the form of a single all-encompassing intelligible system in which each element has a necessary place. Moreover, this Absolute—the universe as a whole—he held to be the only true "particular", all elements within it being ultimately resoluble into specific "universals" (properties, relations, or combinations thereof that might be given identically in more than one context). He regarded his metaphysical monism as essentially a form of Spinozism.

Also strongly critical of reductionist accounts of mind (e.g., behaviorism), he maintained to the contrary that mind is the reality of which we are in fact most certain. Thought, he held, is that activity of mind which aims at truth, and the ultimate object of thought is full understanding of the Absolute. Such understanding comes about, in his view, through a grasp of necessity: to understand (or explain) something is to see it as necessitated within a system of which it is a part.

On Blanshard's view, the Absolute is thus not merely consistent (i.e., noncontradictory) but positively coherent, shot through with relations of necessity and indeed operating purely deterministically. (Blanshard held the law of causality, properly understood, to be a logical law and believed that effects logically determine their causes as well as vice versa.) Strictly speaking, he admitted, we cannot prove that there are no atomic facts, bare conjunctions, or sheer surds in nature, but we can take it as our working hypothesis that relations of necessity are always to be found; until and unless this hypothesis meets with absolute defeat, we are justified in adopting it at least provisionally.

In his early work The Nature of Thought, he defended a coherence theory of truth (though this is not the main thrust of that book, which, as the title makes explicit, is an essay in philosophical psychology). In his later years, however, he came to think that the relation between thought and object was sui generis and might be described, about equally inadequately, as either "correspondence" or "coherence"; at any rate, he admitted, the "coherence" between thought and its ideal object differs from the coherence that may obtain among thoughts. He also backed away from his early (more or less Bradleian) claim that the ultimate aim of thought was identification with its object.

He defended a strong doctrine of internal relations. He maintained, with longtime friend and philosophical colleague A.C. Ewing, that the doctrine would have caught on far better had it been more accurately described in terms of "relevance" rather than of "internality". His doctrine on this point was that no relation is entirely irrelevant to the natures of the terms it relates, such relevance (and therefore "internality") being a matter of degree. One of Blanshard's most important exchanges on this topic was with philosopher Ernest Nagel, who attacked the doctrine of internal relations — indeed, Blanshard's entire conception of reason — in his essay "Sovereign Reason". Blanshard's fullest published reply appears in his book Reason and Analysis.

Sympathetic to theism but skeptical of traditional religious and theological dogma, he did not regard his Absolute as having the characteristics of a personal God but nevertheless maintained that it was a proper subject of (rational) religious inquiry and even devotion. Defining "religion" as the dedication of one's whole person to whatever one regards as true and important, he took as his own religion the service of reason in a very full and all-encompassing metaphysical sense, defending what he called the "rational temper" as a human ideal (though one exceedingly difficult to achieve in practice). His admiration for this temper extended his philosophical loyalties across "party lines", especially to the one philosopher he regarded as exemplifying that temper to the greatest degree: Henry Sidgwick. (He also spoke highly of Bertrand Russell.) Theologically, Blanshard was raised Methodist but tended toward theological liberalism from an early age, a tendency that became more pronounced as he grew older. Beginning during his time at Swarthmore, he maintained a lifelong connection with the Religious Society of Friends despite personal disagreements with some of Quakerism's generally accepted tenets (notably its pacifism).

In ethics, he was broadly utilitarian; however, he preferred the term "teleological" since the term "utilitarian" suggested that all goods were instrumental and he believed (with, e.g., H. W. B. Joseph and W. D. Ross) that some experiences were intrinsically good. He also denied that pleasure is the sole good, maintaining instead (with T. H. Green) that experiences are good as wholes and that pleasure is not, strictly speaking, a separable element within such wholes. Disagreeing with G. E. Moore that the "naturalistic fallacy" is really a fallacy, he gave an entirely naturalistic analysis of goodness, holding that an experience is intrinsically good to the degree that it (a) fulfills an impulse or drive and (b) generates a feeling-tone of satisfaction attendant upon such fulfillment. He regarded the first of these factors as by far the more important and held that the major intrinsic goods of human experience answer to the basic drives of human nature; he maintained that these two factors together provide not merely a criterion for but the actual meaning of intrinsic goodness. (He defined all other ethical terms, including "right", in terms of intrinsic goodness, a right act, for example, being that act which tends to produce the greatest amount of intrinsic goodness under the relevant circumstances.)

The little that Blanshard wrote on political theory (mainly in Reason and Goodness) owed much to Green and Bosanquet. These two philosophers, he held, had rescued Jean-Jacques Rousseau's confused doctrine of the general will and placed it on a rationally-defensible footing. Our "real will" (in Bosanquet's terms) or "rational will" (in Blanshard's) is simply that which we would want, all things considered, if our reflections upon what we presently desire were pursued to their ideal limit. Blanshard argued that there is excellent reason to regard this "ideal" will as in fact real, and contended that it provided the foundation for a rational political theory. The state is justified if, and precisely insofar as, it helps individual human beings to pursue and achieve the common end which is the object of their rational will. He did not develop this doctrine to the point of advocating any specific form of political organization or social structure, but in his Schilpp autobiography, he described an early sympathy for socialism and to having voted the "straight Democratic ticket" over the previous 40-odd years.

A firm believer in clarity of exposition, and himself one of the ablest writers of philosophical prose in the English language, he wrote a short book "On Philosophical Style" in defense of the view that philosophical profundity need not (and should not) be couched in obscurity and obfuscation. Both this book and his Reason and Analysis are probably best understood as complementary facets of his extensive work on metaphilosophy (never labeled as such).

While Blanshard was a great admirer of the clarity and rigor of British analytical philosophy, which he saw as its best characteristic, he was appalled by what he regarded as the greatly shrunken scope of philosophy as conceived by both logical positivism and later 'ordinary language' philosophy. He critiqued this in his book "Reason and Analysis." His incisive critiques of Wittgenstein, Russell, and Moore placed him at odds with the main currents of Anglo-American philosophy. At the same time he was unsympathetic to what he saw as the anti-rationalism, and tendency to obscurantism, of Existentialism, which placed him at odds with some tendencies in Continental philosophy.

Finally, his most ambitious book, "The Nature of Thought", reached publication immediately before the outbreak of war, which severely limited the reception it received.

== Major works ==
- The Nature of Thought. London: Allen & Unwin, Library of Philosophy series. 1939. 2 volumes.
- Reason and Goodness. London: Allen & Unwin, Muirhead Library of Philosophy. 1961. 451 pages.
- Reason and Analysis. London: Allen & Unwin. 1962. The Paul Carus lectures, 12th series. 505 pages.
- The Uses of a Liberal Education. La Salle, Illinois: Open Court. 1973. ISBN 9780875481227. 407 pages.
- Reason and Belief. London: Allen & Unwin. 1974.620 pages. ISBN 0-04-230013-4.
- Four Reasonable Men. Middletown, Conn: Wesleyan University Press, distributed by Harper & Row. 1984. His last work. Contains biographical accounts of four exemplars of the rational temper: Marcus Aurelius, John Stuart Mill, Ernest Renan, and Henry Sidgwick. 308 pages. ISBN 0-8195-5100-7.

== See also ==
- American philosophy
