= Josephine Ball =

Psychologist

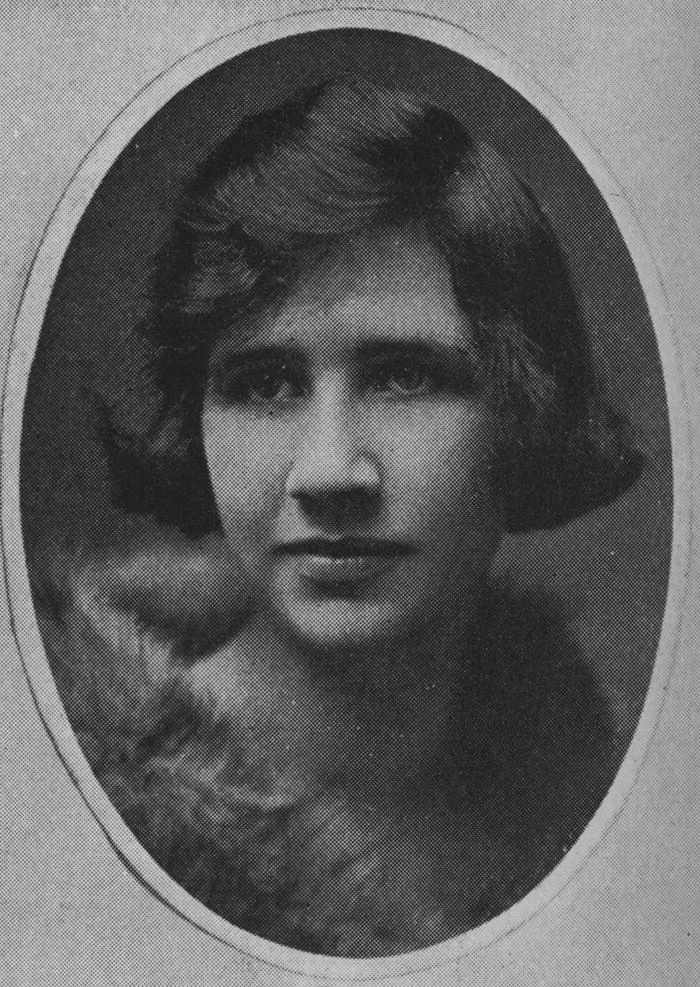
- Born: April 28, 1898
- Died: August 1, 1977 (aged 79)
- Citizenship: American
- Education: University of California, Berkeley
- Scientific career
- Fields: Behavioral Neuroendocrinology
- Thesis: Measurement of Sexual Behavior in Male Rats

Josephine Ball (April 28, 1898– August 1, 1977) was an American comparative psychologist, endocrinologist, and clinical psychologist best known as an early pioneer in the study of reproductive behavior and neuroendocrinology (1920s-1940s). She later worked as a clinical psychologist in the New York State health system and at the Veteran's Administration Hospital in Perry Point, Maryland (late 1940s-1967).

== Education ==
Ball earned her A.B. from Columbia University in 1922. She then worked as an assistant in psychology for Karl Lashley at the University of Minnesota from 1923 to 1926. In 1926, Ball published her first paper in "The female sex cycle as a factor in learning in the rat," one of the first papers on the role of hormones in learning and memory. She also later published a study with Lashley, “Spinal conduction and kinesthetic sensitivity in the maze habit,” which demonstrated that rats trained to run a maze can still run the maze without afferent sensory input via the spinal cord.

From January to June 1924, Ball accompanied Robert Yerkes and Harold C. Bingham on the University of California-sponsored trip to Cuba to visit Rosalía Abreu’s primate colony. Abreu, the daughter of a wealthy Cuban plantation owner was the world's first person to keep a captive breeding colony of chimpanzees. The goal of the expedition for Yerkes was to establish a long-term colony to observe behavior of apes.

In 1927, Ball moved to the University of California, Berkeley where she worked as a teaching fellow in psychology and as a research assistant in the lab of anatomist, embryologist, and endocrinologist Herbert McLean Evans. In 1929, she earned her Ph.D. from the University of California, as well as a diplomate from the American Board of Examiners of Professional Psychologists. Her thesis, “Measurement of Sexual Behavior in Male Rats” was an 18-month study of 61 subjects under repeated and standardized conditions.

== Career ==
After graduation, Ball moved to Baltimore, Maryland accepted a position as an assistant psychobiologist at the Henry Phipps Psychiatric Clinic at Johns Hopkins University Hospital. Almost immediately, she began collaborating with Carl Gottfried Hartman, Director of the Carnegie Institute of Washington. She later joined the Department of Embryology at the institute, where she was primarily associated with Hartman an expert in ovarian physiology and embryology, and later with his successor George Corner, co-discover of the hormone progesterone.

Both Hartman and Corner encouraged Ball's behavioral experiments, which included sexual excitability in Rhesus macaque monkeys across the menstrual cycle (1935), the first demonstration of sexual receptivity in ovariectomized monkeys by injections of estrogen (1936) and the inhibition of sexual receptivity by injections of progesterone (1939). She also documented a case of imitative learning in the monkey (1938). In addition, throughout the 1930s and early 1940s she published a number of fundamental studies during this time period investigating sexual behaviors of both male and female rats, with a special emphasis on the role of hormones and other aspects of physiology in the behavior.

Ball left Baltimore in 1941 and held a series of short-term positions. From 1942 to 1943, she was a research associate at Cornell University’s College of Home Economics. From 1943-1945, she accepted a position as an assistant professor in the psychology department at Vassar College. From 1945-1947, she held an assistant professorship at Connecticut’s Hartford Junior College and was a clinical psychologist at the University of Connecticut’s Institute of Living, which marked the beginning of Ball’s career in the field of clinical psychology.

In 1948, Ball worked as a clinical psychologist for the New York State health system. From 1948-1950, she worked as a senior psychologist at the Rockland State Hospital. From 1950-1955, she served a field supervisor for the New York State Psychological Intern Training Program. She was also the assistant director of psychological services for the New York State Department of Mental Hygiene from 1954-55. In addition, she served as the secretary of the New York State Psychological Association from 1951-1952.

In 1955, Ball returned to Maryland as a research psychologist associated with the now controversial lobotomy research project at the Veterans Administration Hospital in Perry Point, Maryland. Most lobotomies were conducted between 1947 and 1950 and the procedure fell out of favor as tranquilizer drugs became available in the mid-1950s. Ball researched the consequences of lobotomies in a large-scale study and was lead author on the paper, “The Veterans Administration study of prefrontal lobotomy,” published in 1959. In 1959, she left lobotomy research to work as a clinical psychologist at the Veterans Administration Hospital, focusing on gerontology. She remained in this position until her retirement in 1967.

== Research contributions ==
Ball became elected as an associate member of the American Psychological Association in 1930 and became a full member in 1937. She also became a fellow of the Gerontological Society in 1957.

Ball's research on the role of hormones and behavior was some of the earliest in the field, contemporaneous with work of Willam Caldwell (W.C) Young and preceding the work of Frank A. Beach, both of whom were considered founders of the field of behavioral neuroendocrinology. Ball's first paper in 1926 represented the earliest work on the role of steroid hormones on non-sexual behaviors, in this case learning and memory in rats. Her work on the role of hormones and reproductive behavior in both rats and macaques throughout the 1930s and early 1940s constituted fundamental contributions to the field. Beach once commented at a meeting that if a conference on reproductive behavior had been held in the 1930s, it would have three participants: W.C. Young, Josephine Ball, and himself. Beach also considered Ball a friend.
