= Epistemological realism =

Belief that mind-independent reality exists and can be known

Epistemological realism is a philosophical position, a subcategory of objectivism, holding that what can be known about an object exists independently of one's mind. It is opposed to epistemological idealism.

Epistemological realism is related directly to the correspondence theory of truth, which claims that the world exists independently and innately to our perceptions of it. Our sensory data then reflect or correspond to the innate world.

== See also ==
- Epistemic theories of truth
- Epistemic optimism (in the philosophy of science)
- Epistemology
- Philosophical realism
