= Daniel Dreisbach =

American author, academic, and attorney

- Citizenship: American
- Occupation(s): Professor, attorney, author
- Awards: American University's Scholar/Teacher of the Year

Academic background
- Education: J.D. University of Virginia D.Phil. Oxford University B.A. University of South Carolina

Academic work
- Notable works: Reading the Bible with the Founding Fathers (Oxford University Press, 2017).

Daniel Dreisbach is an American author, academic, and attorney. He is currently a professor at the American University School of Public Affairs, teaching in the Department of Justice, Law and Criminology.

Dreisbach teaches at the Summer Institute program of the James Madison Memorial Fellowship Foundation.

He is a specialist on the constitutional issue of the separation of church and state.

== See also ==
- Americans United for Separation of Church and State § Reception by religious community
