= Charles Clayton Morrison =

American journalist

Charles Clayton Morrison (1874–1966) was an American Disciples of Christ minister and Christian socialist.

== Biography ==
Born in Harrison, Ohio, he attended high school in Jefferson, Iowa, Drake University in Des Moines, Iowa, and the University of Chicago. He served as minister at the Monroe Street Church in Chicago, which in 1906, adopted "Open Membership," allowing unimmersed Christians to join the church. This view of baptism was developed in his first book The Meaning of Baptism (1914). It was in 1908, when Morrison was still a young minister, that he purchased the foundering Christian Century magazine in Chicago in 1908. At the time of his purchase, the magazine was a Disciples of Christ journal. Within a decade he had broadened the journal's reach by offering a broadly Protestant perspective. As he did this, he added the subtitle "An Undenominational Journal of Religion." With donations and gradually increasing subscribership, the magazine survived and prospered under his editorship until his retirement in 1947.

During Morrison's stewardship in the 1930s and 1940s, the Christian Century was accused of being antisemitic. It published articles opposing American intervention in World War II for the benefit of the Jews persecuted under the Nazis; arguing moral equivalence between an alleged Jewish-nationalist crucifixion of Jesus and the Nazi persecution of Jews; condemning American Jews for maintaining their distinct identity; and criticizing Rabbi Stephen Wise, president of the World Jewish Congress, for allegedly exaggerating the Holocaust. As late as 1944 the magazine published articles such as "A Reply to Screamers" by Fred Eastman which admonished the suggestion that there was a moral obligation for the United States to aid in the plight of European Jews being murdered during the Holocaust. Marty, writing about the 1940s, described the Christian Century at that time as being an "anti-Zionist" publication.

Morrison became a well-known spokesman for liberal Christianity. He supported the ecumenical movement, particularly the establishment of the World Council of Churches and the National Council of Churches.

== Notable quotes ==
- "The Christian church is a society of sinners. It is the only society in the world membership in which is based upon the single qualification that the candidate shall be unworthy of membership."

References: W. Clark Gilpin, "Morrison, Charles Clyton (1874-1966), in The Encyclopedia of the Stone-Campbell Movement. Edited by Douglas A. Foster, et al. Grand Rapids, MI: Wm. B. Eerdmans Publishing, Company, 2004), pp. 545–546.
