= Alexander Haim Pekelis =

Ukrainian jurist & scholar

- Born: April 1902; Odesa, Russian Empire
- Died: December 28, 1946 (aged 44); Shannon, Ireland
- Education: University of Florence, JJD; Columbia School of Law, JJD
- Known for: Jurist, scholar and activist

Alexander Haim Pekelis (April 1902 – December 28, 1946) was a jurist, scholar and activist. He lived and was educated throughout Europe in his early life, and was a jurist in pre-fascist Italy before moving to France in 1938 and to the United States in 1941. He became the first foreign-born Editor-in-Chief of the Columbia Law Review. Despite his short time in the United States before his untimely death in 1946 at the age of 44, he left his mark on modern United States jurisprudence, his work advocating and foretelling the role social sciences would come to play in deciding legal issues.

Pekelis died in a plane crash in Ireland, at age 44. After his death, his scholarly works and theories were discussed by the Karl E. Meyer, Max Ascoli and Milton R. Konvitz among others.

== Early life ==
Alexander Haim Pekelis was born in Odesa, Russia (now Ukraine), which at the time was part of the Russian Empire. He graduated from Odessa Gymnasium in 1919, before fleeing from Russia in 1920 at the time of the Russian Revolution. He moved to Leipzig, Germany where he studied for a year before moving to Vienna, Austria until 1924. After living in Vienna for 3 years he immigrated to Florence, Italy where he studied law. He was educated at the University of Florence, where he graduated with a law degree in 1928.

An ardent anti-fascist, Pekelis spent a year studying at the London School of Economics in 1929 through a fellowship award, ironically, from the fascist Ministry of Education of Italy. Two years after his graduation from the University of Florence, his graduate thesis was published under the Italian title "ll diritto come volontà costante", ("The Law as a Constant Will"). In 1932, he lectured on Jurisprudence at the University of Florence. Pekelis did not become a professor at the University, however, because the local Fascist party prevented him from doing so, since he had refused to join the party.

However, he became a Professor of Jurisprudence at the University of Rome in 1935. The Italian Racial Laws, which were first introduced in 1938, prohibited foreign born Jews from practicing law, medicine, and other professions in Italy. Because of this and the general growing antisemitism, Pekelis and his family left Italy. He moved to Paris where he practiced law until 1940. When the Germans invaded France, he fled with his young family (his wife, 3 young daughters, and two grandmothers), traveling through Vichy France, Spain and Portugal, finally arriving in the United States as a refugee in 1941.

== Life in the United States ==
In the United States, he became a professor at the New School for Social Research as part of what was then called "The University in Exile." While working as a professor, he had to go to law school all over again, also attending Columbia School of Law. In 1943, he was named the first foreign-born Editor-in-Chief of the Columbia Law Review. After his graduation from Columbia, the University created a new post for him, and he became the Graduate Editor-in-Chief.

His scholarly work from 1941 onwards dealt with the need for judicial action to be informed by social and economic realities; what he termed "A Jurisprudence of Welfare." He was one of the first to anticipate that the Supreme Court would become the champion of a liberal social policy that recognized the role of the social sciences in reaching just results. He wrote, "Law is too serious a business to be left to lawyers… The greatness of the Supreme Court is manifested in its growing awareness that the issues which confront it, no matter how legal, must of necessity find a composition social, economic or political in nature."

Pekelis co-authored an Amicus brief for The American Jewish Congress in the Ninth Circuit case, Mendez v. Westminster School District. In the brief, Pekelis argued that classifications that segregated Mexican children according to race, are based on "discriminatory social or legal notions of ‘inferiority’ or ‘superiority’’’ and therefore unconstitutional.

In 1945, he became Chief Consultant to the Commission on Law and Social Action, American Jewish Congress. While in this role, he was the Chairman of the committee that drafted the original New York statute against discrimination in education. The law was later passed after his death.

During 1946, The New York Times published his letters on various topics. Later that year, on December 28 Alexander Haim Pekelis was killed in a commercial airplane accident in Shannon, Ireland. He was returning from the World Zionist Congress in Basle where he had served as Labor Delegate.

Following his death, his work remains a subject of discussion. For example, in 1964 Karl E. Meyer recognized Pekelis’ vision in an article in the New Statesman. Meyer wrote

Hardly anybody foresaw the possibility of the judiciary serving as an active instrument of liberal social policy. Perhaps the first to articulate this notion was a European emigre who remains in undeserved obscurity. "The federal judiciary, led by the Supreme Court," Alexander Pekelis wrote in the early 1940s, "may very well prove to be, in the coming decade, the most liberal of the three branches of the national government."
