= Robert Yerkes =

American psychologist (1876–1956)

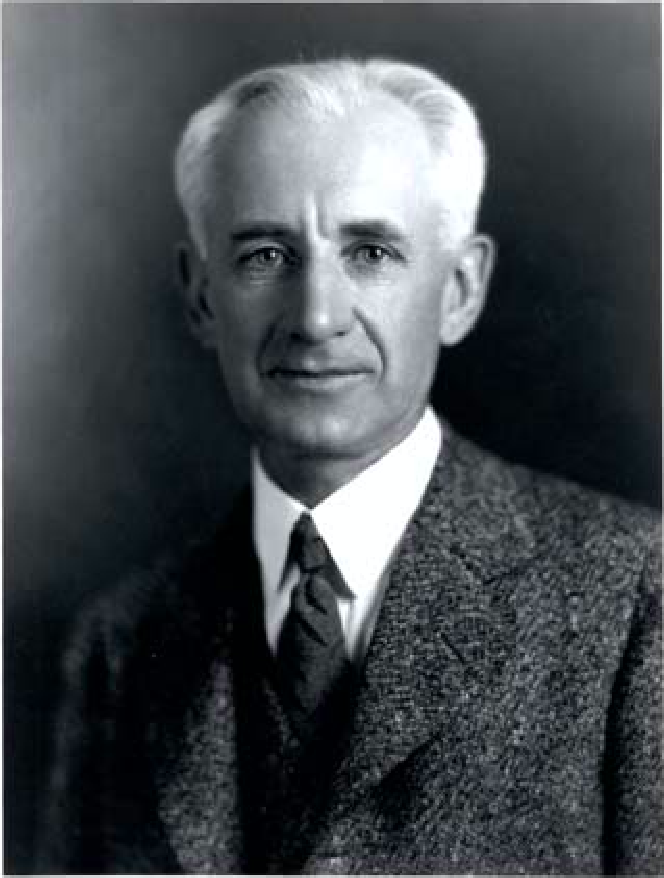
- Born: May 26, 1876; Breadysville, Bucks County, Pennsylvania, US
- Died: February 3, 1956 (aged 79); New Haven, Connecticut, US
- Known for: intelligence testing
- Scientific career
- Fields: psychology

Robert Mearns Yerkes (/ˈjɜːrkiːz/; May 26, 1876 – February 3, 1956) was an American psychologist, ethologist, eugenicist and primatologist best known for his work in intelligence testing and in the field of comparative psychology.

Yerkes was a pioneer in the study both of human and primate intelligence and of the social behavior of gorillas and chimpanzees. Along with John D. Dodson, Yerkes developed the Yerkes–Dodson law relating arousal to performance.

As time went on, Yerkes began to propagate his support for eugenics in the 1910s and 1920s. His works are largely considered by modern academics to be biased toward outmoded racialist theories.

He also served on the board of trustees of Science Service, now known as Society for Science & the Public, from 1921 to 1925. He was elected to the American Academy of Arts and Sciences in 1915, the United States National Academy of Sciences in 1923, and the American Philosophical Society in 1936.

== Education and early career ==
Robert Yerkes was born in Breadysville, Pennsylvania (near Ivyland, Pennsylvania). Growing up on a farm in rural Pennsylvania, Robert Yerkes wanted to leave the hard life of the rural farmer and become a physician. With the financial help of an uncle, Yerkes attended Ursinus College from 1892 to 1897. Upon graduating he received an offer from Harvard University to do graduate work in Biology. Faced with a choice of Harvard or medical training in Philadelphia, he chose to go to Harvard.

At Harvard, Yerkes became interested in animal behavior, so much so that he put off further medical training to study comparative psychology. He earned his Ph.D. in the Psychology Department in 1902.

His early career was strongly influenced by the debts Yerkes incurred paying for school. Upon his graduation from Harvard, he took up a position with the school as an instructor and assistant professor in comparative psychology. He had to supplement his income during the summer for several years by teaching general psychology at Radcliffe College. Another part-time job he took on was being the director of psychological research at the Boston Psychopathic Hospital, Boston, Massachusetts.

In 1907, Yerkes published his first book, The Dancing Mouse. Among his friends during this time was future behaviorist John Watson, with whom he exchanged ideas and collaborated. He was also a member of the Wicht Club (1903–1911).

== Intelligence testing and eugenics ==
In 1917, Yerkes served as president of the American Psychological Association (APA). Under his influence, the APA began several programs devoted to the war effort in World War I. As chairman of the Committee on the Psychological Examination of Recruits, he developed the Army Alpha and Army Beta Intelligence Tests, the first nonverbal group tests, which were given to over 1 million United States soldiers during the war.

Although Yerkes claimed that the tests measured native intelligence, and not education or training, this claim is difficult to sustain in the face of the questions themselves. Question 18 of Alpha Test 8 reads: "Velvet Joe appears in advertisements of ... (tooth powder)(dry goods)(tobacco)(soap)."

Yerkes used the results of tests such as these to argue that recent immigrants (especially those from Southern and Eastern Europe) scored considerably lower than older waves of immigration (from Northern Europe.) The results would later be criticized as very clearly only measuring acculturation, as the test scores correlated nearly exactly with the number of years spent living in the US. Nonetheless, the effects of Yerkes work would have a lasting effect on American xenophobia and anti-immigrant sentiment. His work was used as one of the eugenic motivations for harsh and racist immigration restrictions.

He was appointed as an "Expert Eugenic Agent" to The House Committee on Immigration and Naturalization, where his work would contribute to the creation of the discriminatory National Origins Formula. In his introduction to Carl C. Brigham's A Study of American Intelligence (which helped popularize eugenics in the U.S.), Yerkes stated that "no one of us as a citizen can afford to ignore the menace of race deterioration."

Along with Edward L. Thorndike, Yerkes was a member and Chairman of the Committee on Inheritance of Mental Traits, part of the Eugenics Record Office, which was founded by Charles Benedict Davenport, a former teacher of Yerkes at Harvard.

== National Research Council ==
Immediately after World War I, Yerkes worked as a paid officer for the United States National Research Council (NRC) and took the helm of the NRC Committee for Research in Problems of Sex. The Committee for Research in Problems of Sex helped Yerkes establish close relationships with officers from Rockefeller philanthropic foundations. These relationships later helped him to solicit substantial funds for his chimpanzee projects.

== Primatology ==
Yerkes had a long and storied fascination with the study of chimpanzees. In 1923 he bought Panzee a bonobo and Chim a chimpanzee from Noel Lewis. He brought them home and kept them in a bedroom where they could eat with a fork at a miniature table. Chim was a particular delight for Yerkes, and the summer that chimp and psychologist spent together is memorialized in Almost Human (1924). Both Panzee and Chim died within a year of purchase. He had spent time in 1924 hosted by Rosalía Abreu at her large primate colony in Cuba. She was the first person to succeed in breeding chimpanzees in captivity. He was accompanied by Harold C. Bingham, Josephine Ball and Chim, the bonobo. Chim unfortunately died during the visit. Yerkes returned from this visit with advice from Abreu to help in raising and observing chimps on his own.

In 1924, Yerkes was hired as a professor of psychobiology, a field he pioneered, at Yale University. He founded the Yale University Laboratories of Primate Biology in New Haven, followed by his Anthropoid Breeding and Experiment Station in Orange Park, Florida, with funds from the Rockefeller Foundation. The primate language Yerkish was developed at Yerkes Laboratories of Primate Biology. Yerkes retired from his position as Director in 1942, when he was replaced by Karl Lashley. After his death, the lab was moved to Emory University in Atlanta, Georgia, and renamed the Yerkes National Primate Research Center.

Asked how to say his name, he told The Literary Digest it was YER-keez.

== Legacy ==
In April 2022, Emory University removed Yerkes’ name from the National Primate Research Center, after a review by Emory's Committee on Naming Honors recommended that the name be changed due to Yerkes' past support for eugenics. The Yerkes National Primate Research Center will be known as the Emory National Primate Research Center, effective June 1, 2022.

== Publications ==
- 1907, The Dancing Mouse, A Study in Animal Behavior
- 1911, Introduction to Psychology
- 1911, Methods of Studying Vision in Animals (with John B. Watson)
- 1914, Outline of a Study of the Self
- 1915, A Point Scale for Measuring Mental Ability (with co-authors)
- 1916, The mental life of monkeys and apes
- 1920, Army Mental Tests (by Clarence S. Yoakum and Robert M. Yerkes)
- 1925, Almost Human
- 1929, The Great Apes (with Ada Watterson Yerkes)
- 1943, Chimpanzees; a laboratory colony

== See also ==
- Great Ape personhood
- Yerkes–Dodson law
- Yerkish
- The mind of an ape
- Roberta Yerkes Blanshard
