= Paul Blanshard =

American journalist (1892–1980)

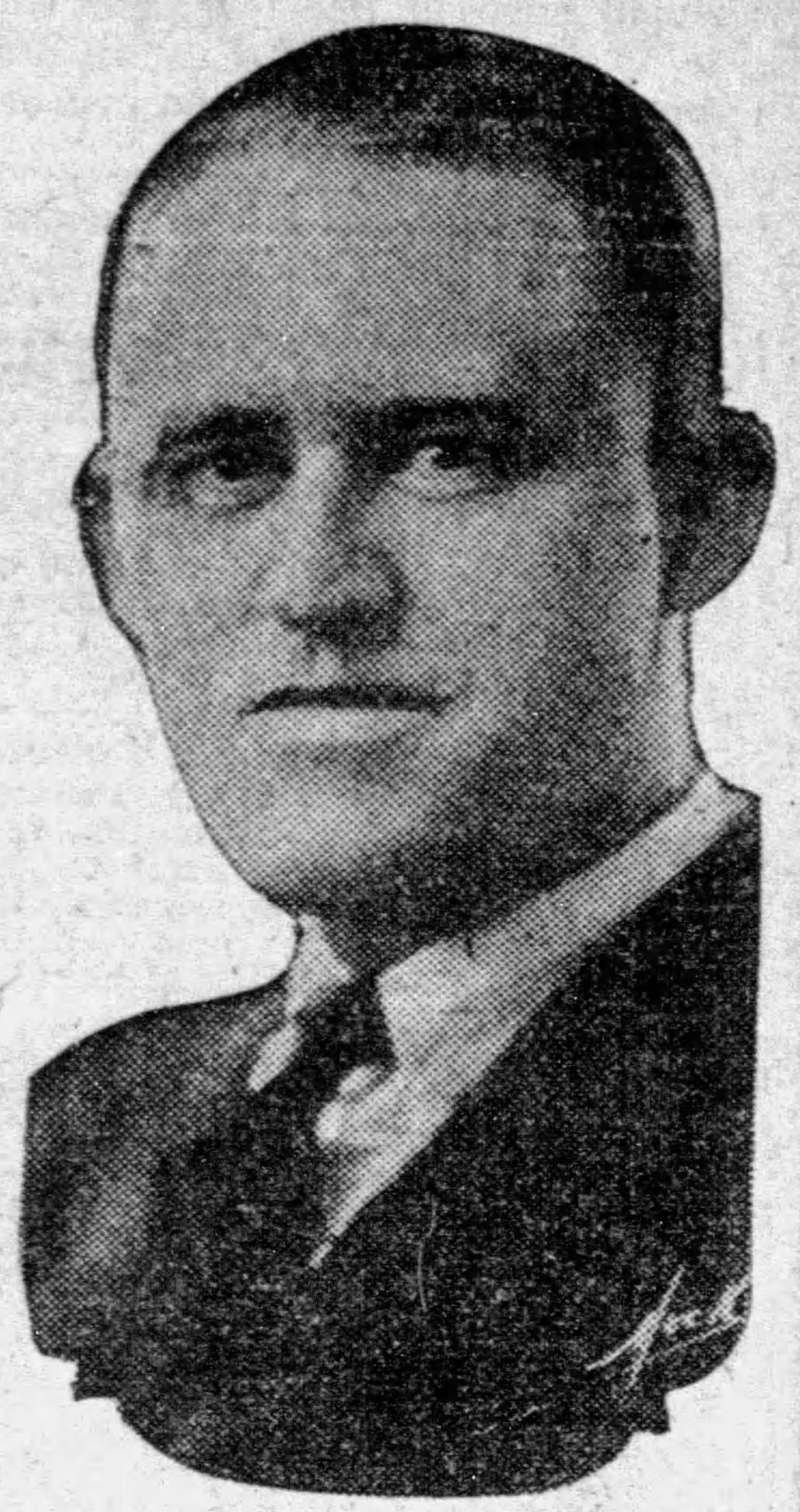
- Blanshard, c. 1927
- Born: Paul Beecher Blanshard; August 27, 1892; Fredericksburg, Ohio, U.S.
- Died: January 27, 1980 (aged 87); Florida, U.S.
- Education: University of Michigan
- Occupations: Author, lawyer
- Relatives: Brand Blanshard (brother)

Paul Beecher Blanshard (August 27, 1892 – January 27, 1980) was an American author, assistant editor of The Nation magazine, lawyer, socialist, secular humanist, and from 1949 an outspoken critic of Catholicism.

== Early life and education ==
Paul and his twin brother Brand were born in Fredericksburg, Ohio, where their father, Francis, was a Congregational minister. Reverend Blanshard and his wife, Emily Coulter Blanshard were Canadian. They met in high school while living in Weston, Ontario, immediately north of Toronto. When the twins were 12 months old, their mother fell down stairs holding a lighted oil lamp. Her clothing caught fire, and she died a day later of severe burns.

Reverend Blanshard brought his sons to Grand Rapids, Michigan, for maternal care by his mother, Orminda Adams Blanshard, widow of Methodist clergyman Shem Blanshard. Francis left them in her care, briefly to pastor a church in Helena, Montana. In 1899 the four moved south to Edinburg Township, Ohio. Upon being diagnosed with tuberculosis, Francis was advised to seek the drier climate of the American West. In 1902, Reverend Blanshard bade his mother and sons goodbye. They moved northwest to Bay View, Michigan, and he moved alone to Albuquerque, New Mexico, where, in 1904, he died, alone in a tent.

Orminda Blanshard raised her grandsons on an annual pension of $250 from the Methodist church while the boys washed dishes at a restaurant. Realizing their need for good education, the family relocated to Detroit in 1908 so the boys could graduate from the well-known Central High School. Soon both were at the top of their class, joined the debating team, and Brand was made class Poet. In 1910 the Blanshard brothers entered the University of Michigan, whose annual tuition was only $30 for state residents.

It was natural that Brand and I should go in for debating and oratory, and each of us won the university's oratorical contest in successive years. Further, we each won in successive years the National Peace Oratorical Contest in which almost one hundred colleges participated. – We almost lived in the college library and reveled in its riches, counting ourselves among the blessed of the earth and coming out somewhere near the top of our class as a result. When we were juniors in 1913, Brand won a Rhodes Scholarship to Oxford and soon left for England. Perhaps that was good for me because I was now compelled to stand on my own, becoming much more sociable, outgoing and aggressive. During those college years I arrived at two decisions about myself. I would be a socialist and I would enter the Christian ministry. In retrospect, the first decision seems entirely natural, but the second decision was the worst blunder of my life.

== Seminary, socialism, war, and apostasy ==
Following graduation from Michigan in 1914, Blanshard enrolled in Harvard Divinity School. Prior to entry, he joined the Socialist Party, of which he remained a member for 19 years. Blanshard found his studies replete with "verbal evasion" and wryly observed that "This institution was what Mark Twain would have called a theological cemetery". He joined the Boston Socialist Party and sometimes was dispatched to local strikes as a clerical agitator. Under these casual arrangements he met both Nicola Sacco and Bartolomeo Vanzetti. Blanshard described his early preaching experience as relying more upon Bernard Shaw than the Bible.

Seated alphabetically for inauguration into Phi Beta Kappa, to Paul's left was Julia Sweet Anderson. A romance and normal courtship was followed by an unusual "Marriage Ceremony for Revolutionists". The eschewing of a Christian ceremony while still at Harvard Divinity School was a portent. The couple humorously described this as "term insurance for our marriage instead of a straight life policy". In 1916, the Congregational church dispatched Paul and Julia Blanshard by ship to Tampa, Florida where a breakaway congregation was conducting interracial worship services and angering the community. Paul Blanshard was ordained in a ceremony which first must conclude that the candidate is fit.

There is no doubt that I was unfit, but when I was examined in an open hearing the ministers failed to ask those questions that would have exposed my unfitness. No one asked me if I believed in the Virgin birth – I did not – or in the bodily resurrection of Jesus – I did not – or in the complete uniqueness of Jesus – I did not. Instead, the ministers happened to ask me several questions on theology and church history, which I answered correctly and with an adequate display of ecclesiastical learning. As I knelt at the end of the proceedings to become, by the laying on of hands, the Reverend Paul Blanshard, I had such an inner sense of tension and conflict that I almost stood up and said: Look here, gentlemen, I agree with your moral aspirations and I love the concept of the church as a center for moral discussion, but I am much more of a heretic than you think, and I really don't belong with your bunch at all.

Those thoughts notwithstanding, Blanshard later finalized a divinity degree at Union Theological Seminary. From his Tampa pulpit, 1916–1917, Blanshard preached against US entrance into the Great War. American entry in April 1917 did not stifle his opinion and soon a Tampa daily printed of him: "we do not condone treason". After a careful, slow, rereading of the New Testament Blanshard decided he was not a Christian believer, resigned his church, became an apostate, and moved to New York City.

By nature and personality he was a reformer and muckraker. Blanshard decided to pursue credentials in Law, completing much of his studies in night school, and graduating LLB in 1937 from Brooklyn Law School.

He was one of the signers of the Humanist Manifesto.

In a speech to the SLID in 1933, Blanshard laid out his vision for 'Socialopia': "An international government, speaking an international language would control all battleships, airplanes, munitions and currency. In the U.S. state lines would vanish and the President and Congress would be replaced by a national Socialist planning board."

== Public office ==
Mayor Fiorello La Guardia appointed Blanshard head of the New York City Department of Investigations and Accounts in 1934. Blanshard's exposures of graft and corruption attracted national attention. Blanshard staffed the office with former associates of the City Affairs Committee (Henry J. Rosner, E. Michael White, and Beatrice Mayer), and friends Will Maslow (later Executive Director of the American Jewish Congress) and Louis E. Yavner (later La Guardia's Commissioner of Investigation).

These efforts were not possible without learning the complex role in power politics played by the Archdiocese of New York. The admixture of and contests of church and state provoked his curiosity. Fifty years old by the onset of World War II, Blanshard served the State Department as an official in Washington and the Caribbean. As an atheist, he observed the role of religion in these settings generally, but began to focus more upon the specifics and the influence of the Roman Catholic Church.

Blanshard was an associate editor of The Nation and served during the 1950s as that magazine's special correspondent in Uzbekistan. He is noted for writing American Freedom and Catholic Power, which attacked the Holy See on grounds that it was a dangerous, powerful, foreign and undemocratic institution.

In 1960, he was invited to attend the famous Houston Ministers Conference and spearhead the questioning of Catholic Presidential candidate Senator John F. Kennedy. Kennedy presumed that Blanshard would be there and studied the 1958 second edition of American Freedom and Catholic Power in preparation. Blanshard did not go to Houston. In his autobiography Blanshard explained his respect and admiration for John F. Kennedy.

One week after the inauguration of President Kennedy, Blanshard spoke to a crowd of three thousand at Constitution Hall in Washington on the subject of a Catholic President. Blanshard then represented Protestants and Others United for Separation of Church and State, now called Americans United for Separation of Church and State. The text of that speech was published in pamphlet form, and a speech audiotape is retained by Wheaton College. Some weeks later, when Kennedy was facing a religious battle over federal aid to education, he reached out to Blanshard for guidance.

== Death ==
Blanshard died in Florida at the age of 87.

== Books by Blanshard ==
- 1923. An Outline of the British Labour Movement. G.H. Doran.
- 1927. Labor in southern cotton mills. New Republic.
- 1932. What's the Matter with New York. with Norman Thomas, Macmillan Co.
- 1933. Technocracy and Socialism League for Industrial Democracy.
- 1947. Democracy and Empire in the Caribbean. Macmillan Co.
- 1949. American Freedom and Catholic Power. Beacon Press.
- 1951. Communism, Democracy, and Catholic Power. Beacon Press.
- 1952. My Catholic Critics. Pamphlet, 52pp. Beacon Press.
- 1954. The Irish and Catholic Power. Beacon Press
- 1955. The Right to Read: The Battle Against Censorship. Beacon Press.
- 1958. American Freedom and Catholic Power, Revised 2nd Ed., Beacon Press.
- 1960. God and Man in Washington. Beacon Press.
- 1961. The Future of Catholic Power Speech to DAR, Am. United Sep. C & S
- 1962. Freedom and Catholic Power in Spain and Portugal. Beacon Press.
- 1963. Religion and the Schools – the great controversy. Beacon Press.
- 1966. Paul Blanshard on Vatican II. Beacon Press.
- 1973. Personal and Controversial – an Autobiography. Beacon Press.
- 1974. Some of my Best Friends are Christian. Open Court.
- 1977. Classics of Free Thought. Paul Blanshard, Editor. Prometheus.

Secondary:

- John Courtney Murray, "Paul Blanshard and the New Nativism" (1951) short essay by leading Catholic theologian.
- Brand Blanshard, "My Brother Paul." Church and State, vol. XXXIII, no. 3 (March 1980): 12–14.
- Barbara Welter, "From Maria Monk to Paul Blanshard: A Century of Protestant Anti-Catholicism." In Uncivil Religion: Interreligious Hostility in America, Robert N. Bellah and Frederick E. Greenspan, eds., 43–71. New York: Crossroad, 1987. Scholarly overview.
- James M. O'Neill, Catholicism and American Freedom, New York, Harper & Brothers, 1952.
