= American Freedom and Catholic Power =

Book by Paul Blanshard

- Author: Paul Blanshard
- Language: English
- Subject: Catholic Church in the United States
- Published: 1949
- Publication place: United States
- Media type: Print

American Freedom and Catholic Power is an anti-Catholic book by American writer Paul Blanshard, published in 1949 by Beacon Press. Blanshard asserted that America had a "Catholic problem" in that the Church was an "undemocratic system of alien control". The book has been described as propaganda and as "the most unusual bestseller of 1949–1950". Some reviewers thought that the book incorporated nativist sentiments into its anti-Catholicism, including that the Church was a foreign power in America determined to dominate the world. In the prologue, Blanshard said that he was not opposed to the Catholic religion or to Catholic Americans, but that the church's hierarchy had an undue influence on legislation, education and medical practice.

The book began as a controversial series of articles in The Nation that set the Archbishop of New York against Eleanor Roosevelt. Despite some resistance, it became a bestseller, winning praise from well-known intellectuals. Catholic writers denounced it as bigoted and based on longstanding Protestant bias.

== Writings in The Nation ==
Blanshard started doing the research behind the book in 1946 when he became concerned about the influence of Catholic doctrine on the practice of obstetrics. In the late 1940s, he published a series of articles that questioned and criticized specific activities and goals of the Catholic Church in the United States. Cardinal Francis Spellman, the Archbishop of New York, pressured New York school libraries to cancel subscriptions to The Nation, an action denounced by Eleanor Roosevelt. The series of articles formed the basis for the book published by Beacon Press in their book series entitled Series in Freedom and Power.

== Reception and criticism ==
When the book was released, The New York Times refused to accept advertising for the book and many bookstores refused to carry it. However, the book sold 240,000 copies in its first edition. It was praised by John Dewey, Albert Einstein, Bertrand Russell, Henry Sloane Coffin, and Horace Kallen as well as scholarly reviewers. A work of rebuttal, Catholicism and American Freedom was written by James M. O'Neill and published in 1952. Blanshard's rejoinder to O'Neill and others was the pamphlet My Catholic Critics. Blanshard published a second edition that updated the book. Blanshard was later a vocal admirer of John F. Kennedy.

William A. Donohue of the Catholic League for Religious and Civil Rights calls it a "hate-filled" book that raised the "old canard of 'dual loyalties'" and included such "rubbish" as Blanshard's "Catholic Plan for America", which purportedly entailed "seizing the government, repealing the First Amendment, outlawing divorce, and making the pope the president's official superior". Philip Jenkins, the Protestant author of The New Anti-Catholicism: The Last Acceptable Prejudice, notes that the book contains echoes of the views of the American Protective Association and the Ku Klux Klan and, although Blanshard's plan of "resistance" to Catholicism did not prescribe the violence of those earlier anti-Catholic predecessors, that in the shadow of World War II readers would read the word resistance to have such an implication.

Catholic author Robert Lockwood states the work essentially makes a secularist argument, despite having its foundation in English anti-Catholicism of a Protestant variety.

== Second edition, 1958 ==
Beacon Press released a revised, second edition in 1958. In the Preface to the Revised Edition, Blanshard wrote:

"It is almost ten years since American Freedom and Catholic Power was published as a book, and somewhat more than a decade since major portions of this work appeared in magazine form. I express my appreciation to those American and foreign readers (several millions) who made possible the miraculous passage of this book through the vicissitudes of twenty-six printings in this country and abroad.

– No book in recent years has drawn a heavier barrage from ecclesiastical batteries. The work is often called "controversial" – and I "the dean of American controversy". I do not care to repudiate the title, since I regard controversy in a good cause as entirely honorable. – It is my purpose here to bring all factual statements up to date, to cover the most dramatic and significant events in the battle of Catholic power during the past decade, and to add to the narrative more abundant documentation so that every controversial assertion may be supported by the latest items of evidence from Catholic sources.

In the Second Edition, Blanshard included three issues that he said any Catholic candidate for the U.S. Presidency must address: "the Catholic boycott of public schools, the drive of Catholic bishops for public funds, and the appointment of a Vatican ambassador."
