= Deaths in July 2011 =

The following is a list of notable deaths in July 2011.

Entries for each day are listed alphabetically by surname. A typical entry lists information in the following sequence:

- Name, age, country of citizenship at birth, subsequent country of citizenship (if applicable), reason for notability, cause of death (if known), and reference.

== July 2011 ==
=== 1 ===
- Jane Baker, 88, American community organizer and politician, first female Mayor of San Mateo, California.
- Leslie Brooks, 89, American actress.
- Edmund Snow Carpenter, 88, American anthropologist.
- Charlie Craig, 73, American songwriter ("She's Single Again", "The Generation Gap"), lung cancer.
- Willie Fernie, 82, Scottish footballer, Alzheimer's disease.
- Bud Grant, 79, American television executive, president of CBS (1980–1987).
- Anne LaBastille, 75, American author and ecologist.
- Bébé Manga, 60, Cameroonian singer, cardiac arrest.
- Bob McCann, 47, American basketball player (Minnesota Timberwolves, Washington Bullets), heart failure.
- Harold Nelson, 88, New Zealand Olympic runner.
- Paul Romand, 80, French Olympic skier.
- Jean-Louis Rosier, 86, French racecar driver.

=== 2 ===
- Ibrahim M. Abu-Rabi', 54–55, Palestinian professor.
- Khalid Aziz, 73, Pakistani cricket umpire.
- Reeve Maclaren Bailey, 100, American ichthyologist.
- Itamar Franco, 81, Brazilian politician, President (1992–1995), leukemia.
- Magnar G. Huseby, 82, Norwegian engineer and politician.
- Olivera Marković, 86, Serbian actress.
- Ross Martin, 68, Australian Olympic cross-country skier, cycling accident.
- Chaturanan Mishra, 86, Indian politician and trade union leader, long illness.
- Sir Oliver Napier, 75, Northern Irish politician, leader of the Alliance Party of Northern Ireland (1972–1984).
- Robert Sklar, 74, American film historian, cycling accident.
- Juno Stover-Irwin, 82, American diver, Olympic silver (1956) and bronze (1952) medalist.

=== 3 ===
- Abudureyimu Ajiyiming, 68, Chinese politician.
- Ali Bahar, 50, Bahraini singer, guitarist and organ player, kidney failure.
- Theo Beyleveldt, 63, South African politician, retired military officer.
- Iain Blair, 69, British romance novelist, published under the name Emma Blair.
- Martin Crowe, 88, Australian Olympic athlete.
- Francis King, 88, British writer.
- Anna Massey, 73, British actress (Frenzy, Hotel du Lac, The Importance of Being Earnest), cancer.
- Fred Newman, 76, American psychotherapist.
- Sir Roy Redgrave, 85, British Army general.
- Len Sassaman, 31, American cryptographer, suicide.
- John C. Truesdale, 89, American public servant, National Labor Relations Board chairman (1998–2000), cancer.

=== 4 ===
- Şerban Cantacuzino, 70, Romanian actor and nobleman, descendant of Wallachian Prince Şerban Cantacuzino.
- Wes Covington, 79, American baseball player (Milwaukee Braves, Kansas City Athletics, Philadelphia Phillies), cancer.
- John Davies Evans, 86, British archaeologist.
- Rusty Farley, 57, American politician, member of the Oklahoma House of Representatives (2011).
- Otto von Habsburg, 98, Austro-Hungarian royal and politician, MEP (1979–1999).
- Billy Hardee, 56, American football player (Denver Broncos, Ottawa Rough Riders), motorcycle accident.
- Zurab Kapianidze, 74, Georgian actor and politician, MP (1999–2003).
- Scott McLaren, 20, British Army soldier, killed by the Taliban in Afghanistan.
- Pablo McNeil, 71, Jamaican Olympic athlete and coach, long illness.
- Lawrence R. Newman, 86, American advocate for the deaf.
- Éva Sebők-Szalay, 62, Hungarian Olympic volleyball player.
- Jane Scott, 92, American rock music critic.
- William G. Thrash, 94, American Marine Corps lieutenant general.
- Neil Turner, 77, Australian politician, Speaker of the Legislative Assembly of Queensland (1996–1998); MLA for Warrego (1974–1986) and Nicklin (1990–1998).
- Gerhard Unger, 95, German opera singer.

=== 5 ===
- Hilda Anderson Nevárez, 72, Mexican trade union leader and politician.
- Jaap Blokker, 69, Dutch businessman, cancer.
- Neil Dougherty, 50, American basketball coach (TCU).
- Malcolm Forsyth, 74, South African-born Canadian trombonist and composer, pancreatic cancer.
- David Getches, 68, American educator and Native American rights lawyer, pancreatic cancer.
- Armen Gilliam, 47, American basketball player (Phoenix Suns, New Jersey Nets, Milwaukee Bucks), heart attack.
- George Lang, 86, Hungarian-born American restaurateur and cookbook author, Alzheimer's disease.
- Odd Mæhlum, 89, Norwegian Olympic track and field athlete.
- Fonce Mizell, 68, American jazz and R&B record producer (Mizell Brothers).
- Mika Myllylä, 41, Finnish cross country skier, 1998 Olympic gold medalist. (body found on this date)
- Theodore Roszak, 77, American scholar (The Making of a Counter Culture), cancer.
- Hanna Segal, 92, British psychoanalyst.
- John Sweet, 95, American actor (A Canterbury Tale).
- Gordon Tootoosis, 69, Canadian actor (Pocahontas, Legends of the Fall, Lone Star) and activist, pneumonia.
- Cy Twombly, 83, American painter, cancer.
- Shinji Wada, 61, Japanese manga artist (Sukeban Deka), heart disease.

=== 6 ===
- Steve Cardiff, 53, Canadian politician, automobile accident.
- Paul-André Crépeau, 85, Canadian legal academic.
- Daniel Mortimer Friedman, 95, American jurist.
- Mani Kaul, 66, Indian filmmaker, after long illness.
- George Edward Kimball, 67, American boxing columnist (Boston Herald), esophageal cancer.
- Marketa Kimbrell, 82, American actress, Alzheimer's disease.
- Warren Leslie, 84, American author, journalist and business executive.
- John Mackey, 69, American Hall of Fame football player (Baltimore Colts, San Diego Chargers).
- Ali Attalah Obeidi, Libyan military officer and rebel commander.
- Josef Suk, 81, Czech violinist, prostate cancer.
- Andreas Waldherr, 43, Austrian rally driver, crushed under car.
- Mark Whitehead, 50, American Olympic cyclist.
- Keith Wilson, 69, British production designer (Space: 1999).
- Gabriele Zeilinger, 93, Austrian Olympic fencer.

=== 7 ===
- Ricardo Alegría, 90, Puerto Rican anthropologist, complications of heart disease.
- Peter Aucoin, 67, Canadian educator (Dalhousie University).
- Bill Boddy, 98, British motor sport journalist.
- Ganapathi Bose, 72, Indian cricketer.
- Frank Brenchley, 93, British diplomat.
- Allan W. Eckert, 80, American historian.
- Manuel Galbán, 80, Cuban guitarist (Buena Vista Social Club), heart attack.
- Rasika Joshi, 38, Indian actress, leukemia.
- Yuri Kukin, 78, Russian singer-songwriter.
- Humberto Leal Garcia, 38, Mexican murderer, executed by lethal injection.
- José Carlos Martínez, 48, Argentine politician, Senator (since 2007), traffic collision.
- Rizalino Navarro, 72, Filipino business executive, Secretary of Trade and Industry (1992–1996), heart attack.
- Miguel Purugganan, 79, Filipino Roman Catholic prelate, Bishop of Ilagan (1974–1999).
- Olav Versto, 60, Norwegian journalist and editor (Verdens Gang), drowning.
- Dick Williams, 82, American baseball player and manager (Oakland Athletics), Hall of Famer, ruptured aortic aneurysm.

=== 8 ===
- Anthony Aikman, 69, British screenwriter and film director.
- Kenny Baker, 85, American fiddler, complications from a stroke.
- Roberts Blossom, 87, American actor (Home Alone, Escape from Alcatraz, Doc Hollywood), cerebrovascular disease.
- William R. Corliss, 84, American physicist and writer.
- Sam Denoff, 83, American television writer (The Dick Van Dyke Show, That Girl) and actor (The Princess Diaries), four-time Emmy winner, complications from Alzheimer's disease.
- Aleksis Dreimanis, 96, Latvian-born Canadian geologist.
- Pete Duranko, 67, American football player (Denver Broncos), amyotrophic lateral sclerosis.
- Mary Fenech Adami, 77, Maltese First Lady (2004–2009), wife of Prime Minister Eddie Fenech Adami, heart attack.
- Betty Ford, 93, American First Lady (1974–1977) and co-founder of Betty Ford Center.
- Norman Hampson, 89, British historian.
- Paul I. LaMott, 94, American politician.
- Camille Lembi Zaneli, 61, Congolese Roman Catholic prelate, Bishop of Isangi (since 2000), plane crash.
- George McAnthony, 45, Italian country singer, heart attack.
- Paul Michael, 84, American actor (Muggsy, Dark Shadows, Masque of the Red Death), heart failure.
- Adolfo Sánchez Vázquez, 95, Spanish-born Mexican philosopher, writer and educator.

=== 9 ===
- Don Ackerman, 80, American basketball player (New York Knicks).
- Facundo Cabral, 74, Argentine singer and songwriter, shot.
- Ralph Goldston, 82, American football player (Philadelphia Eagles, Hamilton Tiger-Cats).
- Carl T. Langford, 92, American politician, Mayor of Orlando, Florida (1967–1980).
- Peter Newmark, 95, British educator and scholar.
- Percy Oliver, 92, Australian Olympic swimmer.
- Arvo Salo, 79, Finnish writer and politician, MP (1966–1970, 1979–1983) and Minister of Culture (1982–1983).
- Hideo Tanaka, 78, Japanese director (Sukeban Deka The Movie), stomach cancer.
- Lee Vines, 92, Canadian-born American television announcer (What's My Line?) and actor, complications from a fall and pneumonia.
- Würzel, 61, British guitarist (Motörhead), ventricular fibrillation.

=== 10 ===
- Pierrette Alarie, 89, Canadian soprano, wife of tenor Léopold Simoneau.
- Travis Bean, 63, American guitar maker, cancer.
- Roberto Guerrero, 86–87, Argentine Olympic cyclist.
- Ragnar Lundberg, 86, Swedish athlete.
- Frank Mascara, 81, American politician, U.S. Representative from Pennsylvania (1995–2003), lung cancer.
- Roland Petit, 87, French ballet dancer and choreographer, leukemia.
- Kelly Thomas, 37, American homeless man, beaten.
- Deacon Turner, 56, American football player (Cincinnati Bengals), shot.
- Malcolm Wild, 79, Australian soccer player.

=== 11 ===
- Gary Bannerman, 64, Canadian journalist, liver complications.
- Andy Barker, 87, American philanthropist.
- F. C. Barnes, 82, American gospel musician.
- Henry Carlisle, 84, American translator, novelist and anti-censorship activist.
- Helen Crummy, 91, British social activist.
- Michael Evans, 59, British Roman Catholic prelate, Bishop of East Anglia (since 2003), prostate cancer.
- Tom Gehrels, 86, Dutch-born American astronomer.
- Rob Grill, 67, American singer and songwriter (The Grass Roots).
- Alex Hay, 78, British golf journalist.
- Andreas Ioannides, 53, Cypriot navy chief, explosion.
- Jaroslav Jiřík, 71, Czech hockey player (St. Louis Blues), plane crash.
- George Lascelles, 7th Earl of Harewood, 88, British aristocrat, magazine editor and arts administrator, first cousin of Queen Elizabeth II.
- Herbert Matayoshi, 82, American politician, Mayor of Hawaii County (1974–1984).
- Richard F. Pedersen, 86, American diplomat, President of American University of Cairo (1977–1990).
- Maxhob'ayakhawuleza Sandile, 55, South African monarch, King of Rharhabe.
- Sir Filoimea Telito, 66, Tuvaluan President of the Church of Tuvalu, Governor-General (2005–2010), heart attack.
- Steve Trimble, 53, American football player (Denver Broncos), heart attack.

=== 12 ===
- Aftab Ahmad Khan, 87, Pakistani military officer, heart attack.
- Premangsu Chatterjee, 83, Indian cricketer.
- Peter Crampton, 79, British politician, member of the European Parliament (1989–1999), suspected brain haemorrhage.
- William Crozier, 81, Irish artist.
- Bob Fraser, 66, American actor, producer and writer, melanoma.
- Bolesław Gładych, 93, Polish World War II flying ace.
- Howard Hilton, 47, American baseball player (St. Louis Cardinals).
- Ahmed Wali Karzai, 50, Afghan politician, brother of President Hamid Karzai, shot.
- Jokapeci Koroi, 79, Fijian politician, President of Fiji Labour Party (1991–2011).
- Francisco Villagrán Kramer, 84, Guatemalan politician, Vice President (1978–1980).
- Kurt Lundquist, 85, Swedish Olympic bronze medal-winning (1948) athlete.
- Charles Asa Schleck, 86, American Roman Catholic prelate, titular archbishop and under-secretary of the Congregation for the Evangelization of Peoples (1995–2000).
- Rudy Schulze, 82, Canadian Olympic shooter.
- Sherwood Schwartz, 94, American Hall of Fame television producer and writer (The Brady Bunch, Gilligan's Island, I Married Joan), Emmy winner (1961).
- Tony Stevens, 63, American choreographer, dancer and actor, Hodgkin's lymphoma.
- Zdeněk Sýkora, 91, Czech abstract painter.

=== 13 ===
- Raymond Beckman, 86, American Olympic soccer player, coronary artery disease.
- Giacomo Benevelli, 86, Italian sculptor.
- Per-Erik Burud, 48, Norwegian businessman, boating accident.
- Al Debbo, 87, South African comedian.
- Allan Jeans, 77, Australian football player and coach, pulmonary fibrosis.
- John Mosca, 86, American restaurateur (Mosca's), prostate cancer.
- Jerry Ragovoy, 80, American songwriter ("Time Is on My Side"), stroke.
- Heinz Reincke, 86, German actor.
- Niall Shanks, 52, British-born North American philosopher.

=== 14 ===
- Dekha Ibrahim Abdi, 47, Kenyan peace activist, recipient of the Right Livelihood Award, car accident.
- S. George Bankoff, 89, American chemical engineer.
- Sissel Solbjørg Bjugn, 63, Norwegian poet and children's writer.
- Isabel McNeill Carley, 92, American music educator and composer.
- Eric Delaney, 87, British percussionist and band leader.
- William Lockhart Garwood, 79, American jurist (United States Court of Appeals for the Fifth Circuit), heart attack.
- Noel Gayler, 96, American Navy admiral.
- Otia Ioseliani, 81, Georgian writer and dramatist.
- Leo Kirch, 84, German media entrepreneur.
- Vladimir Kosinsky, 66, Russian swimmer, 1968 Olympic silver and bronze medalist.
- Terrence Lanni, 68, American casino executive, cancer.
- Kennedy Ondiek, 44, Kenyan Olympic athlete.
- Antonio Prieto, 85, Chilean singer and actor, cardiac arrest.

=== 15 ===
- Helen Beverley, 94, American actress (Green Fields), natural causes.
- Luis Enrique Sam Colop, 56, Guatemalan linguist.
- Manuel Corral, 76, Spanish religious leader, Pope of the Palmarian Catholic Church (since 2005).
- John Crook, 80, British ethologist.
- Cuddly Dudley, 87, British rock and roll singer, natural causes.
- Ed Flesh, 79, American art director, inventor of the Wheel of Fortune wheel, chronic obstructive pulmonary disease.
- Cornell MacNeil, 88, American operatic baritone.
- Michael Magee, 81, Canadian actor (The Raccoons, Yes You Can), and author, colitis.
- John S. Toll, 87, American physicist and educational administrator, heart failure.
- Googie Withers, 94, English actress.

=== 16 ===
- Milo Anstadt, 91, Dutch journalist and writer.
- Bertalan Bicskei, 66, Hungarian footballer and coach.
- Forrest Blue, 65, American football player (San Francisco 49ers, Baltimore Colts).
- Geraint Bowen, 95, Welsh poet.
- Rouhollah Dadashi, 29, Iranian powerlifter and bodybuilder, stabbed.
- Ante Garmaz, 83, Argentine actor, fashion designer and model.
- Albin Małysiak, 94, Polish Roman Catholic prelate, auxiliary bishop of Kraków (1970–1993).
- Dame Kāterina Mataira, 79, New Zealand educator and Māori language proponent, co-founder of Kura Kaupapa Māori.
- Cesare Mazzolari, 74, Italian-born South Sudanese Roman Catholic prelate, Bishop of Rumbek (since 1998).
- Joe McNamee, 84, American basketball player (Rochester Royals, Baltimore Bullets).
- Kazimierz Neumann, 77, Polish Olympic rower.
- Keith Smith, 96, Australian engineer.
- Charlie Woollett, 90, English footballer (Bradford City).

=== 17 ===
- Juan Arza, 88, Spanish footballer and coach.
- Dionysios Bairaktaris, 84, Greek Orthodox hierarch, Metropolitan of Chios, Psara and Inousses (since 1979).
- Juan María Bordaberry, 83, Uruguayan politician and dictator, President (1972–1976), after a long illness.
- Georges Condominas, 90, French anthropologist.
- Aba Dunner, 73, German-born Jewish religious activist.
- Anne Garber, 64, Canadian journalist and writer, cancer.
- Lo' Lo' Mohd Ghazali, 53, Malaysian politician, cancer.
- Jan Mohammad Khan, Afghan presidential adviser, shot.
- Jim Kincaid, 76, American news correspondent (ABC News), anchorman (WVEC) and essayist, heart attack.
- John Kraaijkamp Sr., 86, Dutch actor and comedian.
- Takaji Mori, 67, Japanese Olympic bronze medal-winning (1968) footballer, renal pelvic cancer.
- Joe Morris Sr., 85, American Navajo World War II code talker.
- David Ngoombujarra, 44, Australian actor (Kangaroo Jack, Australia, Ned Kelly).
- Graciela Rivera, 90, Puerto Rican opera singer.
- Ștefan Sameș, 59, Romanian footballer (Steaua București), cancer.
- Alex Steinweiss, 94, American graphic designer, inventor of the album cover.
- Taiji, 45, Japanese musician and songwriter (X Japan, Loudness), suicide by hanging.
- Mohammed Hashim Watanwal, 58–59, Afghan politician, shot.
- Joe Lee Wilson, 75, American jazz singer.

=== 18 ===
- Nat Allbright, 87, American radio broadcaster, pneumonia.
- Mohammad Taghi Barkhordar, 87, Iranian industrialist and entrepreneur.
- Salvador Bernárdez, 58, Honduran footballer, heart attack.
- Albert Driedger, 75, Canadian politician, stroke.
- Sean Hoare, 47, British journalist (News of the World), whistleblower of the 2011 phone hacking scandal, natural causes. (body found on this date)
- E. A. J. Honigmann, 83, British Shakespearean scholar.
- Magnus Malan, 81, South African politician, Minister of Defence (1980–1991), natural causes.
- Giulio Rinaldi, 76, Italian Olympic boxer.
- Bob Stenehjem, 59, American politician, member of the North Dakota Senate (since 1993), majority leader (since 2001), car accident.
- Edson Stroll, 82, American actor (McHale's Navy), cancer.
- James Wong Kim Min, 89, Malaysian politician, first Deputy Chief Minister of Sarawak, leader of the national Opposition (1974), heart attack.
- Bagley Wright, 87, American developer and philanthropist.

=== 19 ===
- Sheila Burrell, 89, British actress.
- William Leonard D'Mello, 80, Indian Roman Catholic prelate, Bishop of Karwar (1976–2007).
- Remo Gaspari, 90, Italian politician.
- Lil Greenwood, 86, American vocalist (Duke Ellington Orchestra).
- Yoshio Harada, 71, Japanese actor, pneumonia.
- Henrique Johannpötter, 78, German-born Brazilian Roman Catholic prelate, Bishop of Bacabal (1989–1997).
- Pierre Jonquères d'Oriola, 91, French equestrian, Olympic gold (1952, 1964) and silver (1964, 1968) medalist.
- Jacques Jouanneau, 84, French actor.
- Brendan Kehoe, 40, Irish software developer and author, acute myeloid leukemia.
- Karen Khachaturian, 90, Russian composer.
- Roy Meehan, 79, New Zealand Olympic wrestler.
- James T. Molloy, 75, American government officer, last Doorkeeper of the House of Representatives (1974–1993), complications of diabetes.
- Sir Julian Oswald, 77, British admiral.
- Cec Thompson, 85, British rugby league player.

=== 20 ===
- Sudarshan Akarapu, 57, Indian politician, heart attack.
- Armando Martín Borque, 90, Spanish entrepreneur.
- Blaize Clement, 78, American mystery writer and psychologist, cancer.
- Lucian Freud, 88, German-born British painter.
- Isaia Italeli, 51, Tuvaluan Cabinet minister. (body found on this date)
- Myra Kraft, 68, American philanthropist.
- Jim Samios, 77, Australian politician, member of the New South Wales Legislative Council (1984–2003).
- Gloria Sawai, 78, American-born Canadian author.
- Mary Simpson, 85, American minister, first woman to be ordained by the American Episcopal Church.
- Mark Anthony Stroman, 41, American convicted spree killer, executed by lethal injection.
- Whetu Tirikatene-Sullivan, 79, New Zealand politician, longest-serving female member of the House of Representatives (1967–1996).

=== 21 ===
- Franz Alt, 100, Austrian-born American mathematician.
- Clément Cailleau, 88, French-born Senegalese Roman Catholic prelate, Prefect of Tambacounda (1970–1986).
- Ashleigh Connor, 21, Australian soccer player, car accident.
- Andrew Grant DeYoung, 37, American convicted murderer, executed by lethal injection.
- Pedro Claro Meurice Estiu, 79, Cuban Roman Catholic prelate, Archbishop of Santiago de Cuba (1970–2007).
- Elliot Handler, 95, American businessman, co-founder of Mattel, namer of the Barbie doll, creator of Hot Wheels, heart failure.
- William Hildenbrand, 89, American government officer, Secretary of the United States Senate (1981–1985).
- Yevgeny Lopatin, 93, Russian Olympic silver medal-winning (1952) weightlifter.
- Santokh Singh Matharu, 69, Kenyan Olympic hockey player.
- Slavomir Miklovš, 77, Croatian Greek Catholic hierarch, Bishop of Križevci (1983–2009).
- Bruce Sundlun, 91, American politician, Governor of Rhode Island (1991–1995).
- Kazimierz Świątek, 96, Estonian-born Belarusian Roman Catholic cardinal, Archbishop of Minsk-Mohilev (1991–2006).
- Jack Thompson, 82, British politician, MP for Wansbeck (1983–1997).
- Len Tolhurst, 85, Australian Olympic shooter.
- Amelia Trice, 75, American Kootenai tribal leader and activist, leader of the last Indian war against the United States, cancer.
- Wang Daheng, 96, Chinese optical physicist.
- Elwy Yost, 86, Canadian television host and writer.

=== 22 ===
- Alex Adams, 76, American basketball coach.
- Tom Aldredge, 83, American actor (The Sopranos, Rounders, Damages), lymphoma.
- Linda Christian, 87, Mexican-born American actress (Tarzan and the Mermaids), colon cancer.
- Dmitri Furman, 68, Russian historian and philosopher, after long illness.
- Volodymyr Kravets, 81, Ukrainian diplomat, permanent Representative of Ukraine to the United Nations, Minister of Foreign Affairs of the Ukrainian SSR.
- Charles Manatt, 75, American lawyer and banker, Chair of Democratic National Committee (1981–1985), Ambassador to Dominican Republic (1999–2001), stroke.
- Malcolm Muir, 96, American jurist.
- Ifti Nasim, 64, Pakistani-born American poet and radio host, heart attack.
- Tex Nelson, 74, American baseball player (Baltimore Orioles).
- Wolfram Thiem, 55, German Olympic rower.
- Cees de Wolf, 65, Dutch footballer (Ajax Amsterdam).

=== 23 ===
- David Aiken, 93, American operatic baritone and opera director.
- Toyoo Ashida, 67, Japanese animator and film director (Fist of the North Star).
- Blair, 43, American poet.
- Terence Boston, Baron Boston of Faversham, 81, British politician, MP for Faversham (1964–1970).
- John Chervokas, 74, American advertising writer.
- Robert Ettinger, 92, American cryonicist, respiratory failure.
- Jack Fitzpatrick, 88, American entrepreneur and politician, co-founder of Country Curtains, Massachusetts State Senator (1973–1980).
- Milton Gwirtzman, 78, American speech writer, advisor to the Kennedy family, metastatic melanoma.
- Fran Landesman, 83, American lyricist and poet.
- Butch Lewis, 65, American boxing promoter, heart attack.
- Christopher Mayer, 57, American actor (The Dukes of Hazzard, Santa Barbara, Liar Liar).
- Conrad Meyer, 89, British Anglican prelate, Bishop of Dorchester (1979–1988)
- Bill Morrissey, 59, American singer-songwriter.
- Nguyễn Cao Kỳ, 80, Vietnamese air force chief and political leader, Prime Minister of South Vietnam (1965–1967).
- Richard Pike, 61, British chemist.
- Dariush Rezaeinejad, 34, Iranian electrical engineering PhD student.
- John Shalikashvili, 75, Polish-born American army general, Chairman of the Joint Chiefs of Staff (1993–1997), stroke.
- Elmer B. Staats, 97, American public servant, Comptroller General of the United States (1966–1981).
- Amy Winehouse, 27, British singer-songwriter ("Rehab", "Stronger Than Me", "Take the Box"), accidental alcohol poisoning.

=== 24 ===
- Ron Davies, 85, Australian politician, Western Australian Opposition Leader (1978–1981).
- Kaveinga Faʻanunu, 48, Tongan politician, MP for Tongatapu 9 (since 2010), head and neck cancer.
- Tresa Hughes, 81, American actress (Another World, Don Juan DeMarco, Fame).
- Gilbert Luján, 70, American painter, prostate cancer.
- Hideki Irabu, 42, Japanese baseball player (Chiba Lotte Marines, New York Yankees, Montreal Expos), suicide by hanging.
- Paul Marchand, 74, Canadian Roman Catholic prelate, Bishop of Timmins (since 1999).
- Henry Metelmann, 88, German soldier and writer.
- Virgilio Noè, 89, Italian Roman Catholic cardinal, Archpriest of the Basilica of Saint Peter (1991–2002).
- Mike Palm, 86, American baseball player (Boston Red Sox).
- Dan Peek, 60, American singer-songwriter (America), fibrinous pericarditis.
- David Servan-Schreiber, 50, French physician, neuroscientist and author, cancer.
- G. D. Spradlin, 90, American actor (North Dallas Forty, The Godfather Part II, Apocalypse Now).
- Skip Thomas, 61, American football player (Oakland Raiders), apparent heart attack.
- John Turner, 63, British social psychologist.
- Jane White, 88, American actress (Beloved, Klute, Once Upon a Mattress).
- Hans-Werner Wohlers, 77, German Olympic boxer.

=== 25 ===
- Norman Aspin, 88, British diplomat.
- Michael Cacoyannis, 89, Cypriot filmmaker (Zorba the Greek, Electra, Iphigenia).
- Bakır Çağlar, 69–70, Turkish jurist, lawyer and constitutional law professor, bleeding stomach.
- V. S. Krishna Iyer, 89, Indian activist and politician, after long illness.
- Mahmoud Mabsout, 69, Lebanese actor, heart attack.
- Denis Meaney, 74, Australian rugby league player.
- Arthur W. Murray, 92, American test pilot, Alzheimer's disease.
- Jeret Peterson, 29, American free style skier, 2010 Winter Olympics silver medalist, suicide by gunshot.
- Ravichandran, 71, Malaysian-born Indian actor, lung infection.
- David Somerville, 95, Canadian Anglican prelate.

=== 26 ===
- Jay Adcox, 60, American football player and coach, cancer.
- Joe Arroyo, 55, Colombian singer.
- Jacques Fatton, 85, French-born Swiss footballer.
- Frank Foster, 82, American jazz saxophonist and composer, complications from kidney failure.
- Bobby Franklin, 54, American politician, member of the Georgia House of Representatives (since 1997), apparent heart attack.
- Ahmed al-Gaddafi al-Qahsi, 41, Libyan Army colonel, cousin and son-in-law of Muammar Gaddafi, air strike.
- Richard Harris, 63, American football player (Philadelphia Eagles, Seattle Seahawks) and coach (Winnipeg Blue Bombers), heart attack.
- Madhu Sudan Kanungo, 84, Indian scientist.
- Sakyo Komatsu, 80, Japanese science fiction writer, pneumonia.
- Georges Kwaïter, 83, Syrian-born Lebanese Melkite Catholic hierarch, Archbishop of Saïdā (1987–2006).
- Elmer Lower, 98, American broadcast executive, president of ABC News (1963–1974).
- Silvio Narizzano, 84, Canadian-born British film and television director.
- Margaret Olley, 88, Australian painter.
- John Read, 88, British documentary producer.
- Josephine C. Reyes, 82, Filipino educator, President of Far Eastern University (1985–1989).
- Denise Scharley, 94, French contralto.
- Howard Stein, 84, American financier, complications of a stroke.
- Luis Ruiz Suárez, 97, Spanish-born Macanese Jesuit priest.

=== 27 ===
- Wilfred Arsenault, 57, Canadian politician, cancer.
- Rudolf Baláž, 70, Slovak Roman Catholic prelate, Bishop of Banská Bystrica (since 1990).
- Bejaratana, 85, Thai royal, only daughter of King Vajiravudh of Thailand.
- Richard Chavez, 81, American activist and labor organizer, brother of Cesar Chavez, complications from surgery.
- Clyde Duncan, 57, Guyanese West Indian cricket umpire, cancer.
- Hilary Evans, 82, British picture librarian and author.
- Charles Gittens, 82, American Secret Service agent, first black appointed to that position.
- Ghulam Haider Hamidi, 65, Afghan politician, Mayor of Kandahar (since 2007), bombing.
- Rei Harakami, 40, Japanese musician, cerebrovascular disease.
- Ágota Kristóf, 75, Hungarian-born French novelist.
- Jerome Liebling, 87, American photographer, filmmaker and academic (Hampshire College).
- Polly Platt, 72, American production designer (Terms of Endearment, The Witches of Eastwick) and film producer (Say Anything...), complications from amyotrophic lateral sclerosis.
- Sir John Rawlins, 89, British naval officer, pioneer of diving medicine.
- Eduard Rozovsky, 84, Russian cinematographer (Amphibian Man, White Sun of the Desert), car accident.
- Richard Rutt, 85, British Anglican prelate, Bishop of Leicester (1979–1991)
- Pietro Sambi, 73, Italian Roman Catholic prelate, titular archbishop and Apostolic Nuncio to the United States (since 2005), respiratory failure.
- Judy Sowinski, 71, American roller derby skater and coach.
- Francis John Spence, 85, Canadian Roman Catholic prelate, Archbishop of Kingston (1982–2002).
- John Stott, 90, British Anglican priest.

=== 28 ===
- Lev Baklyshkin, 77, Soviet Olympic equestrian.
- Frank Bender, 70, American forensic artist, pleural mesothelioma.
- Miguel Chacón Díaz, 81, Spanish cyclist.
- James E. Dyer, 64, American politician, Mayor of Danbury, Connecticut (1979–1987).
- Ahmed Omaid Khpalwak, 25, Afghan journalist (BBC News), explosion.
- Agapito Lozada, 72, Filipino Olympic swimmer.
- John Marburger, 70, American physicist and presidential adviser, non-Hodgkin lymphoma.
- Brian O'Leary, 71, American scientist and NASA astronaut, cancer.
- Christopher Walkden, 73, British Olympic swimmer.
- John Milton Yinger, 95, American sociologist.
- Abdul Fatah Younis, 67, Libyan rebel leader and government official, former Interior Minister, shot.

=== 29 ===
- Elazar Abuhatzeira, 62, Moroccan-born Israeli rabbi, stabbed.
- John Edward Anderson, 93, American businessman and philanthropist, pneumonia.
- Jack Barlow, 87, American country music singer and songwriter.
- Arild Braastad, 64, Norwegian diplomat.
- Joseph V. Brady, 89, American behavioral neuroscientist.
- Enzo Coppini, 91, Italian cyclist.
- Claude Laydu, 84, Belgian actor, heart condition.
- Richard Marsh, Baron Marsh, 83, British politician and businessman, MP for Greenwich (1959–1971), Chairman of British Rail (1971–1976).
- Nella Martinetti, 65, Swiss singer-songwriter, pancreatic cancer.
- Gene McDaniels, 76, American singer-songwriter.
- Ivan Milas, 72, Croatian politician.
- Takeshi Miyaji, 45, Japanese video game designer and business executive (GunGriffon, Grandia).
- Matthew J. Perry, 89, American federal judge.
- Emeric Santo, 90, Australian Olympic fencer.
- Agnes Varis, 81, American philanthropist, cancer.
- Derek Woodhead, 76, Australian cricketer.

=== 30 ===
- Hikmat Abu Zayd, 88, Egyptian politician, first female cabinet minister.
- James Atkinson, 97, English priest, biblical scholar, and theologian.
- R. E. G. Davies, 90, British aviation historian.
- Pêr Denez, 90, French Breton linguist and writer.
- Mario Echandi Jiménez, 96, Costa Rican politician, President (1958–1962), pneumonia.
- Vincent Kympat, 64, Indian Roman Catholic prelate, first Bishop of Jowai (since 2006).
- Daniel D. McCracken, 81, American computer scientist, cancer.
- Sam Norkin, 94, American caricaturist and illustrator.
- Bob Peterson, 79, American basketball player (New York Knicks, Baltimore Bullets, Milwaukee Hawks), cancer.

=== 31 ===
- David R. Adamson, 88, Canadian Air Force officer.
- Eliseo Alberto, 59, Cuban-born Mexican writer, complications from a kidney transplant.
- Dorothy Brunson, 72, American businesswoman, first black woman to own a radio station, ovarian cancer.
- Willie Corbett, 88, Scottish footballer (Celtic).
- Ian Daglish, 59, British military historian, plane crash.
- Clyde Holding, 80, Australian politician, federal minister (1984–1990).
- John Hoyland, 76, English abstract painter, complications following heart surgery.
- Louis, 59, Serbian singer, car accident.
- Andrea Pazzagli, 51, Italian footballer (A.C. Milan), stroke.
- Joseph Albert Rosario, 96, Indian Roman Catholic prelate, Bishop of Amravati (1955–1995).
- Carl Steven, 36, American actor (Star Trek III: The Search for Spock, Honey, I Shrunk the Kids, A Pup Named Scooby-Doo), heroin overdose.
- Binka Zhelyazkova, 88, Bulgarian director.
