= Adcox =

Adcox may refer to:

== People ==
- Grant Adcox (1950–1989), American stock car driver
- Jay Adcox (1950–2011), American football player and coach
- William H. Adcox (born 1958), chief security officer for the University of Texas MD

== Others ==
- Adcox Aviation Trade School, established in Portland, Oregon in the 1910s
  - Adcox Cloud Buster (Adcox A-100), two-seat enclosed sporting biplane built by the students of the US Adcox Aviation Trade School in 1931
  - Adcox Special, two-seat open-cockpit biplane built by the students of the US Adcox Aviation Trade School in 1929
  - Adcox Student Prince, two-seat open-cockpit biplane designed by Basil Smith and built by the students of the US Adcox Aviation Trade School in 1929

== See also ==
- Adcock
