= Hefame Group =

Grupo Hefame
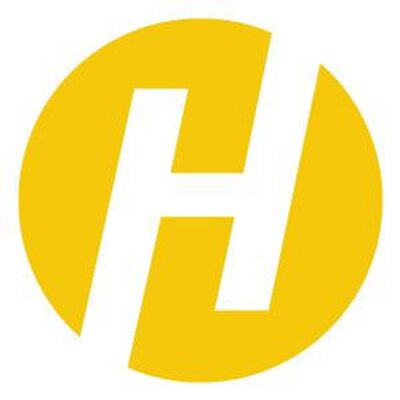
- Company type: Cooperative
- Industry: Distribution
- Founded: Cartagena, Spain (1950; 76 years ago)
- Headquarters: Carretera Santomera Abanilla km 158; Santomera; Murcia, Spain
- Area served: Spain
- Key people: D. Carlos Coves López (CEO)

The Hefame Group is a Spanish cooperative which distributes pharmaceutical products.

Created in the 1950s in Cartagena under the name of Hermandad Farmacéutica del Mediterráneo S.C.L, the group has become one of the three main distributors within the 13 Autonomous communities where it is located. It also distributes its own products through its proper brand: Interapothek.

== Figures ==
First firm in turnover in the Region of Murcia, its birthplace, the group has turned to be one of the three first distributors in Spain with broadly 9.85 % of Spanish pharmaceutical distribution's market share in 2013. Mostly developed on the Mediterranean coast of Spain from Girona to Málaga, and in the community of Madrid, it owns 8 warehouses and 6 offices which distribute its products among the 13 autonomous communities in which it sells its products. As of 2015, it is in charge of 5,447 drugstores, which represents more than 15 million unities distributed every month within a panel of about 25,000 different products.

== A cooperative ==
- Famesa (Farmacéutica del Mediterráneo, S.A): Subsidiary of the Group Hefame, it is dedicated to providing services to clients who are not Hefame's associates.
- Recomed (Reguladora de Compras del Mediterráneo, S.A): Central buying service of Hefame, which processes the purchasing of pharmaceutical products.
- Hefame informatica (Hefame Informática S.L.): That firm offers specialized IT services to drugstores such as the management program UNYCOPWIN, hardware or any material they may require.
- Segumed (Segumed S.L.): Insurance Brokerage firm specialized in the pharmaceutical sector.
- Servicios Integrales (Servicios Integrales S.L.): Tax advice firm, specialized in the pharmaceutical sector. It assists drugstores for various operations from the management of their business to any modification of their statues (personal, inheritance etc.)
- Interapothek (Interapothek S.A): Its goal is to develop and sell pharmaceutical and pharmaceutical products to drugs stores. It is the own brand of Hefame.
- Olmed (Olmed Operadores Logísticos del Mediterráneo, S.A): Firm specialized in the transportation of pharmaceutical products.
- Propamed (Promociones Parafarmacéuticas del Meditérráneo, S.A.): The goal of Propamed is to promote specific pharmaceutical products

== Social responsibility ==
=== Foundation Hefame ===
Created on the 12 of January 1998 in collaboration with the Real Academia de Medicine and surgery of Murcia, this foundation's goal is that Hefame "be regarded as a reference within the health care sector, in order to provide services to society on matters related to health".

Among other things, it creates formations, seminars, lessons, conferences, forums, congresses, on-line training and promotes articles dealing with health matters. For instance, it has trained more than 20,800 Spanish students during a campaign which lasted from 2011 to 2014.

That association offers a prize every year or every two years to a health doctoral thesis. It also rewards works or publication presented in congresses, Symposiums or in any national or international event.

Aiming at tackling national or international crises, that association has created the project Somos solidarios (We are United) in May 2011. It allows people to send money to trusted organisations in the areas which need it most. It fosters the control of the proper use of the donations and speed up reaction to crises.

That association acts at an international scale, providing both financial and logistic support. For example, Hefame Informatica has let the Centro de Salud María Rafols of Equatorial Guinea have the program Unicopwin for free to so as to help them improve theirs students' formation to management of drugstores.

=== Quality ===
Hefame has integrated to its Quality Management System a chart on environmental issues in 2011 so as to protect the environment and to use more efficiently its resources. It has implemented a policy of waste management (recycling) with implied, among other things, the creation of an ecopark of 1.024 sq m.

=== Cooperative responsibility report ===
Hefame Group has presented its first report on Cooperative responsibility in 2013 in which it "informs all its interest groups about its strategy, actions, actualities and compromises on the working, social, and environmental fields". Its goals is to enhance the impact of the firm on both men and environment.

== Prizes ==
Hefame has received in 2014 and in 2015 in Valencia the prize 'Empresas Sabias' políticas de igualdad y conciliación (Wise firms, policies of equality and conciliation). In term of innovation, Hefame's F+ project has received the prize of the Technological Innovation in Murcia during the third edition of the prizes of the Foro Nueva Murcia.

On a national scale, the Group Hefame has received the Mención de Honor of the IX Edition of the Premio Empresa Flexible patronized by the Ministry of Health, Social Policy and Equality
