= Maria Josefa Alhama y Valera =

Spanish religious sister

Blessed Maria Josefa Alhama y Valera
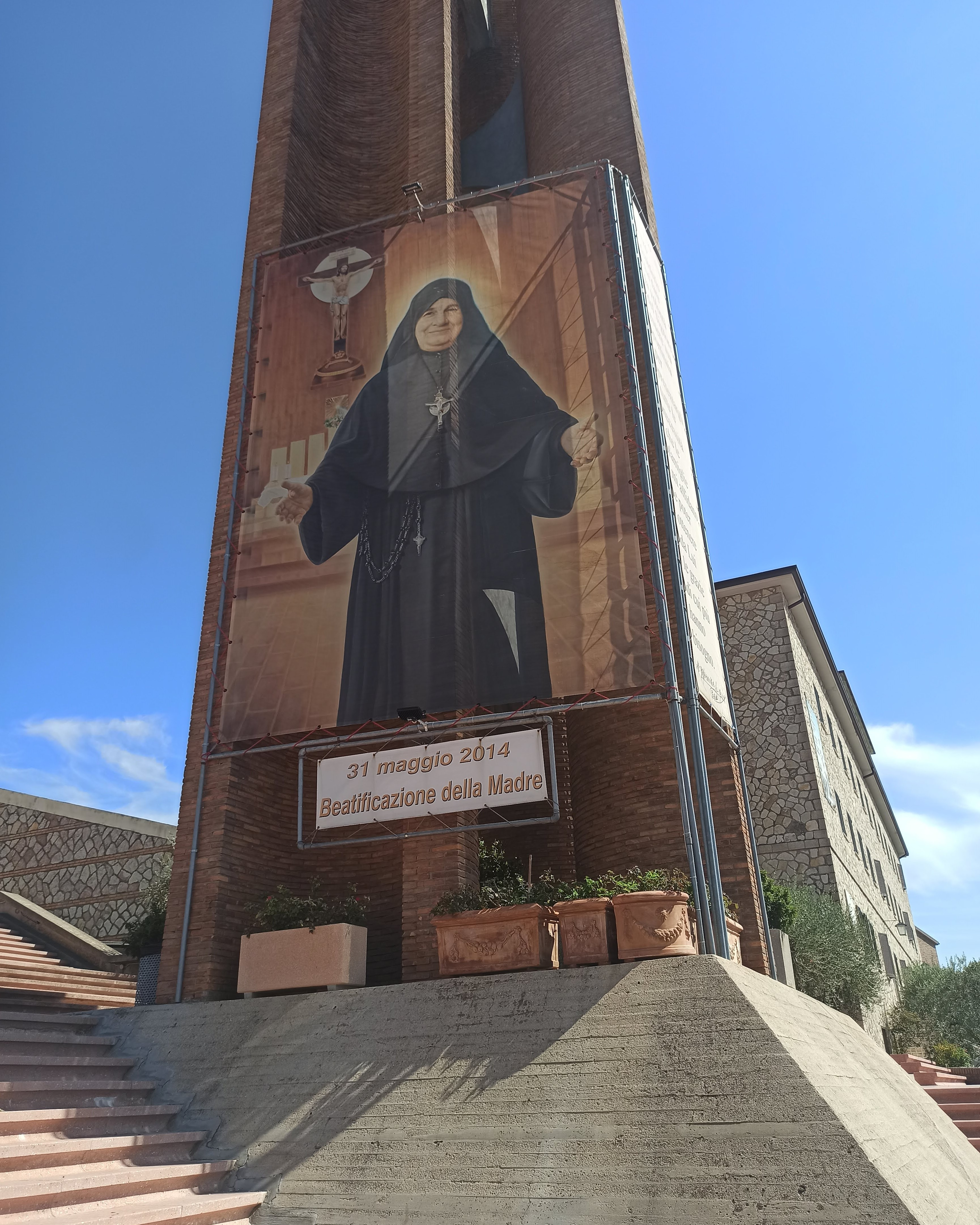
- Born: 30 September 1893; Santomera, Murcia, Spain
- Died: 8 February 1983 (aged 89); Collevalenza, Perugia, Italy
- Venerated in: Roman Catholic Church
- Beatified: 31 May 2014, Collevallenza, Perugia, Italy by Cardinal Angelo Amato
- Feast: 8 February

Maria Josefa Alhama y Valera, religious name Maria Esperanza of Jesus, (30 September 1893 – 8 February 1983) was a Spanish religious sister. She was the founder of both the Handmaids of Merciful Love in 1930 and the Sons of Merciful Love in 1951.

Valera was cleared for beatification in 2013 after a miracle that had found to have been attributed to her intercession was cleared. She was beatified on in 2014 by Cardinal Angelo Amato on behalf of Pope Francis.

== Biography ==
Valera was born in 1893 in Spain to poor parents as the eldest of nine children. Her name of Maria Josefa was in honor of her grandmother. Her mother was a housewife while her father served as an agricultural worker. Valera studied as a child under female religious and it was from them she learnt how to do Homemaking|housework.

Valera received the holy communion age of 8, as she herself said, she "stole Jesus Christ". This occurred when the priest was absent and she went to the tabernacle to receive the communion.

At the age of 21 Valera became a member of the Congregation of the Daughters of Calvary in Villena. She established two congregations in 1930 and in 1951 for women and for men respectively.

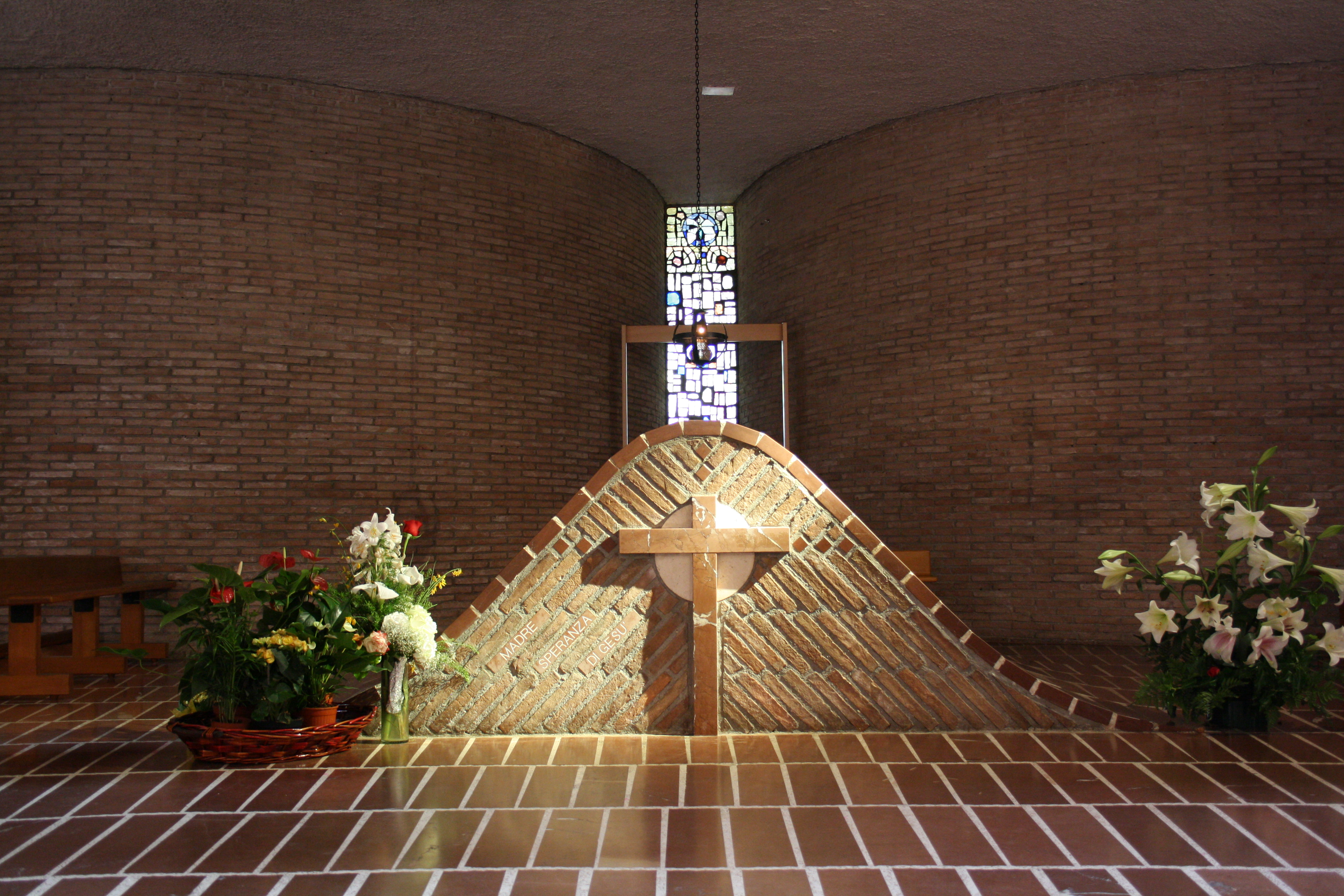
Tomb of Maria Josefa Alhama y Valera in the crypt of the Sanctuary of Merciful Love

In the 1950s she decided to begin a project that she believed represented the will of God: the construction of a sanctuary that would be dedicated to the love of God. On 22 November 1981, Pope John Paul II visited the sanctuary and visited Valera. In 1982, the pope recognized it as being a minor basilica. She died in early 1983 and was buried in that church she worked hard to build.

== Beatification ==
The cause of beatification commenced under Pope John Paul II on 9 March 1988 and the positio – which documented a life of heroic virtue was submitted to the Congregation for the Causes of Saints in 1993. The named her to be venerable on 23 April 2002.

An independent tribunal opened and closed in 2001 in response to a presumed miracle that had occurred. It submitted its findings to the congregation and Pope Francis approved the miracle on 5 July 2013. Cardinal Angelo Amato celebrated the beatification on 31 May 2014.
