= Jane Baker =

Jane Baker may refer to:

- Jane Baker (1924–2014), British television writer, see Pip and Jane Baker
- Jane Baker (mayor) (1923–2011), American mayor of San Mateo, California
- Jane S. Baker (born 1945), former Republican member of the Pennsylvania House of Representatives
