= Gungriffon =

Mech simulation video game series by Game Arts

Gungriffon is a series of video games developed by Game Arts and designed by Takeshi Miyaji. Gungriffon and Gungriffon II originally appeared for the Sega Saturn console in 1996, with more recent appearances in Gungriffon Blaze for the PlayStation 2 and Gungriffon: Allied Strike for the Xbox. The Gungriffon games are focused on piloting mecha—large, usually bipedal military vehicles. This game series refers to these machines as Armored Walking Gun Systems (AWGS). With the exception of the High-MACS design, the mecha in this series have a distinctly realistic design philosophy.

== Gungriffon ==
Year Game Takes Place: 2015

Platform: Sega Saturn
Release Dates:

- JP: March 15, 1996
- NA: June 19, 1996
- EU: July 1996

Gungriffon was developed under the working title "3D Polygon". During development, the game included a multiplayer mode with usage of the Saturn's link cable, but this was cut before release and the final game is single player only. It was released in Japan under the title Gungriffon: The Eurasian Conflict. There were plans to release the game in North America and Europe under the title "Iron Reign", but ultimately Sega, the game's publisher outside Japan, reverted to using a shortened version of the original Japanese title.

In a pre-release interview with Saturn Fan, Game Arts director Takeshi Miyaji explained that Gungriffon made extensive use of the Sega Saturn's multi-chip architecture to render its three-dimensional environments. Individual robot models consisted of approximately 450 polygons, with particular attention paid to the movement of their legs. The development team also emphasised realistic sound design, visiting a Japanese Self-Defense Forces training ground to experience and record military sounds. These recordings informed the game's audio effects, which incorporated Doppler effects to simulate the movement of objects in battle.

According to Greg Becksted, producer of the North American version of the game, the localization team changed the game's storyline slightly to better suit the U.S. market.

=== Reception ===
Reception

Review scores
Publication	Score
Electronic Gaming Monthly	8.25/10
Game Informer	8/10
Next Generation	3/5
Maximum	4/5
Sega Saturn Magazine	88%

Gungriffon received highly positive reviews, with critics hailing it as one of the best mech-based video games to date. The four reviewers of Electronic Gaming Monthly gave it their "Game of the Month" award, praising the responsive controls, sharp and realistic graphics, and exciting pace of the gameplay. Though most of them criticized the way the player mech easily gets caught on buildings, they all gave the game a strong recommendation, with Dan Hsu summarizing it as "the most exciting mech sim I've ever played, including any found on the PC." Rad Automatic of Sega Saturn Magazine called Gungriffon "one of the best giant robot games ever", citing the polished graphics and the fact that missions are widely varied not just in the usual factors of terrain and difficulty, but even in elements such as tactical concept and lighting. Maximum's Rich Leadbetter praised the "very well pitched" difficulty, the impressive polygon models, and the variety of visuals. He criticized the lack of randomization and the fact that players do not need to start the entire game over when they fail a mission, but gave it an overall very positive assessment, calling it "what Krazy Ivan on PlayStation should have been". GamePro likewise said that Gungriffon "makes Krazy Ivan and Ghen War look and feel like rusted heaps of scrap iron." The reviewer was especially pleased with the player mech's ability to hover and the "Clean, almost state-of-the-art graphics". Next Generation's brief review said the game has "eclectic missions and bizarre weapons. It looks good, controls well, and would be a four-star game if not for its brevity and poor pacing."

== Gungriffon II ==
Year Game Takes Place: 2015

Platform: Sega Saturn
Release Dates:

- JP: April 23, 1998

While the first game was single-player only, Gungriffon II has a multiplayer mode using the Saturn's link cable.

== Gungriffon Blaze ==
Year Game Takes Place: 2016

Platform: PlayStation 2
Number of players: 1
Release Dates:

- JP: August 10, 2000
- NA: October 26, 2000
- EU: July 12, 2002

On release, Famitsu magazine scored the game a 33 out of 40.

== Gungriffon Allied Strike ==
Year Game Takes Place: 2024

Platform: Xbox
Release Dates:

- NA: December 14, 2004
- JP: December 16, 2004
- EU: April 8, 2005
