= Project Sylpheed =

2006 video game

- European cover art
- Developers: Game Arts; SETA Corporation
- Publishers: JP: Square Enix; EU/NA: Microsoft Game Studios
- Director: Shinobu Gotou
- Producers: Satoshi Uesaka; Toshio Akashi; Yoichi Miyaji
- Designer: Shinobu Gotou
- Writer: Takumi Sakura
- Composers: Takahiro Nishi; Keigo Ozaki; Kenichiro Fukui; Junya Nakano; Kumi Tanioka
- Platform: Xbox 360
- Release: JP: 28 September 2006; EU: 29 June 2007; NA: 10 July 2007; AU: 19 July 2007
- Genre: Space combat simulator
- Mode: Single-player

Project Sylpheed (Note: Japanese: プロジェクト シルフィード, Hepburn: Purojekuto Shirufido), also known as Project Sylpheed: Arc of Deception in North America, is a space simulation video game developed by Game Arts and SETA Corporation and published by Square Enix for the Xbox 360. It was released by Microsoft Game Studios outside Japan. The game is considered a spiritual successor to Game Arts' Silpheed video game series, which comprised 3D rail shooters: players pilot a starfighter, shooting incoming enemies on a vertically scrolling third-person playing field. Project Sylpheed uses full 3D computer graphics and allows the player to instead pilot their spacecraft in any direction.

Project Sylpheed's plot is set in a fictional 27th century where an interstellar human empire is about to erupt into a civil war. The game pits the protagonist and his spacecraft, configured with a variety of weapons and augmentations, against masses of small enemy fighters and large capital warships. The game is interjected at various points with cutscenes that reveal the story. Critical opinions on Project Sylpheed were mixed; reviews varied from considering it an exciting cinematic shooter to calling it a clichéd and complicated simulator. Microsoft considered the game a commercial success in Japan, with it later sold under the Platinum Collection line.

== Gameplay ==
In Project Sylpheed, players take on the role of a rookie pilot and fly the Delta Saber starfighter in a campaign that comprises 16 missions. Typical mission objectives are to destroy specific enemy targets and to protect allied ships. There are also optional secondary goals, such as completing certain tasks within a time limit or without taking damage. Completing the primary objectives within a time limit successfully completes a mission; failure to do so ends the game. If the player fails a mission several times in a row, the game offers an option to skip to the next stage.

Piloting the Delta Saber, the player engages distant enemies with missiles amidst a sea of colorful contrails.

Players control the Delta Saber from a view as if they were in the cockpit, or a slight distance away from and outside the craft. The controller's thumbstick is used to fly the starfighter in any direction. By pressing the maneuver button and pushing the thumbstick in a direction, the player makes their fighter perform aileron rolls and 180-degrees turns (half-loops). Various button combinations control the Delta Saber's speed, allowing the craft to boost to great speeds with afterburners, coast on inertia without power, or match speed with a target. Certain maneuvers require the expenditure of shield energy, which protects starships from damage; an unshielded vessel under attack suffers damage to its armor. A ship is destroyed when its armor is depleted.

On starting a new campaign, the player receives a small selection of missiles, guns, beams, and bombs to mount on their ship. By accomplishing certain goals in the game, the player obtains advanced weaponry—possessing greater damage, range, and targeting abilities—for their spacecraft. He or she can also purchase more powerful equipment with the points gained by completing missions. These points are determined by factors such as the number of enemies destroyed, the time the mission is completed in, and the number of secondary objectives completed. Aside from functioning as a form of currency to purchase equipment, the points act as a score of the players' performance.

After completing a campaign, the player can replay it in a New Game Plus mode, restarting the new campaign with weapons and equipment gathered in the previous run. Besides the campaign, Project Sylpheed offers six standalone missions that are downloaded over Xbox Live. These missions, with goals such as killing as many enemies as possible within a time limit, provide online leaderboards for players to compare their scores against each other.

== Plot ==
Project Sylpheed's setting, exposited through flashback sequences during the game, is a fictional 27th century in which human civilization has expanded beyond Earth for 500 years, colonizing several worlds and forming the Terra Central Government (TCG). Seated on Earth, the government uses military force to suppress colonial uprisings. The ADAN Alliance, formed by colonists of four star-systems, initially engaged in politics to seek independence for their worlds. The central government's responded by destroying the terraforming facilities of an alliance planet, Acheron, killing many colonists and turning the world inhospitable. ADAN does not believe TCG's cover-up of its involvement in the planet's devastation and launches a war on what they see as a tyrant government.

=== Characters ===

The player assumes the role of Katana Faraway, a young talented pilot in the Terra Central Armed Forces (TCAF). Faraway possesses a strong sense of loyalty to his friends and affiliation. As the game progresses, he gradually falls in love with Ellen Bernstein, a close friend and fellow pilot. Pitted against them are the forces of ADAN. The most prominent among them is Margras Mason, who is modeled after the typical anime antagonist. A close friend of Faraway and Bernstein, Mason was evicted from Earth as tensions escalated between TCG and ADAN. During his return to his homeworld (Acheron), he witnesses its devastation by the TCAF. He joins ADAN to exact vengeance on the TCAF. Commanding ADAN is Doris Egan, daughter of a prominent anti-government activist who was killed in the attack on Acheron. Like Mason, she is also pursuing vengeance, but with an extremist attitude.

=== Story ===
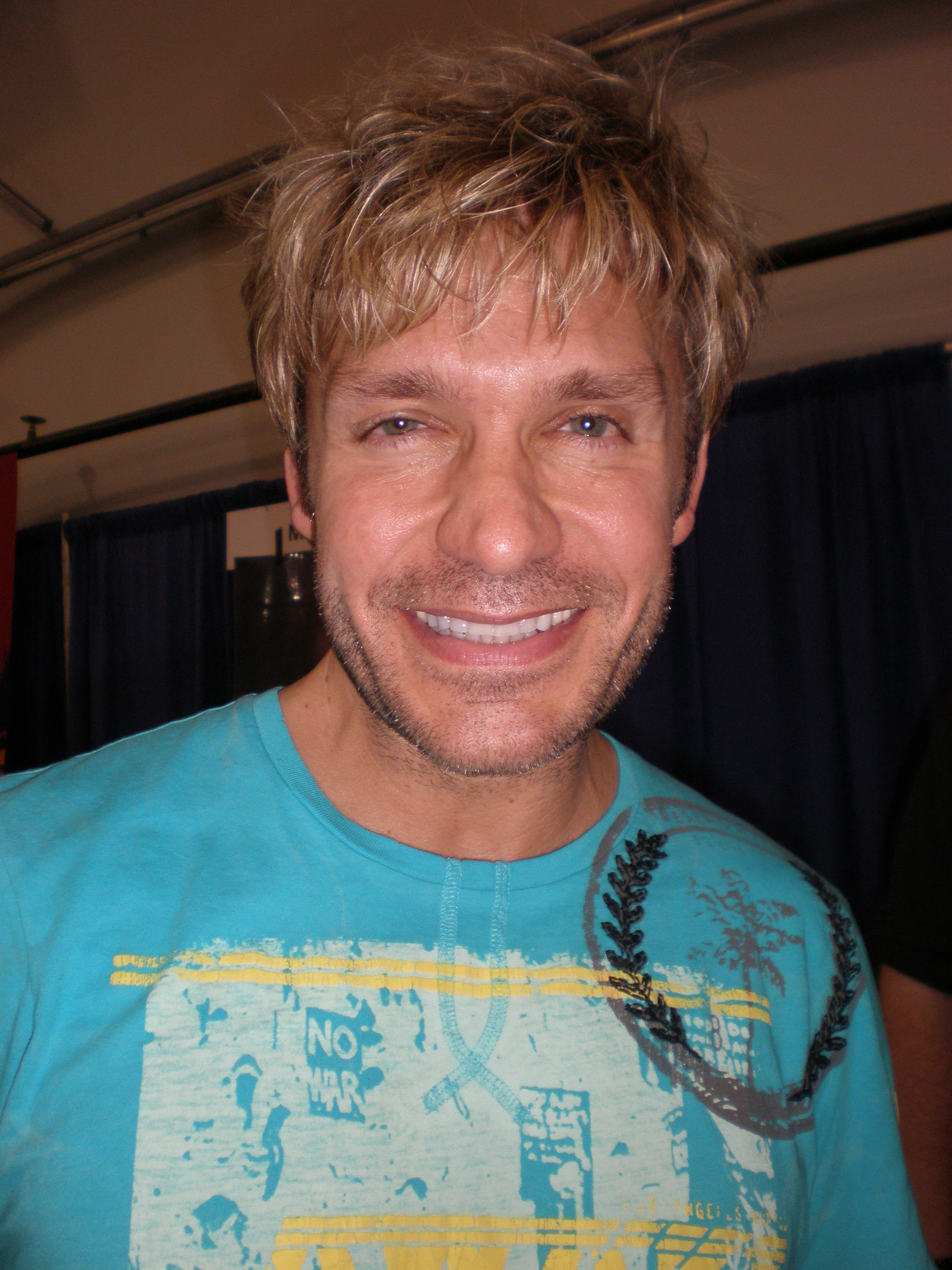
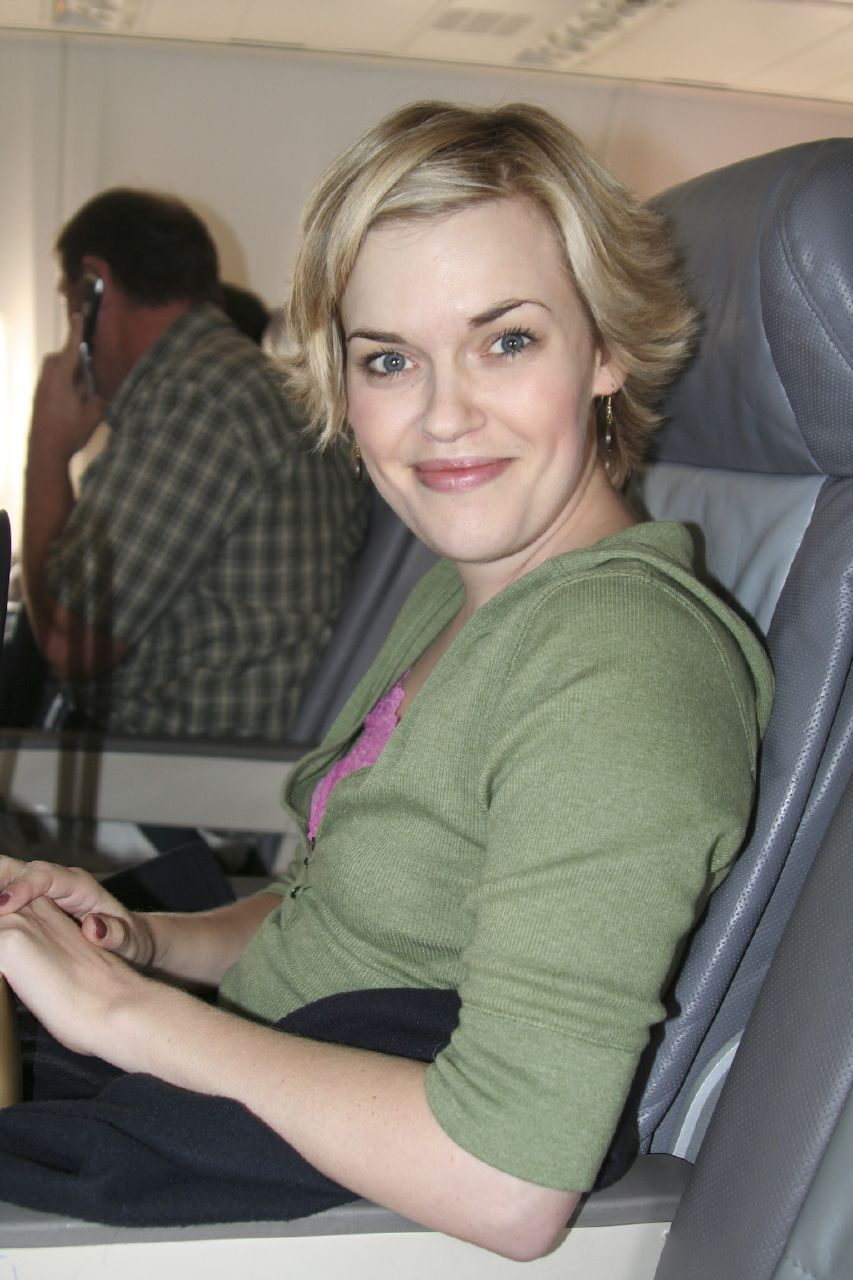
Vic Mignogna (left) and Kari Wahlgren (right) voiced the game's protagonist, Katana Faraway, and his girlfriend, Ellen Bernstein, respectively. Several reviewers were impressed with the voice acting in the game.

Project Sylpheed's plot has the style and substance of typical anime, depicting characters as the focal points of events rather than individual pawns in the grand scheme of things. Told through an hour's worth of animated cutscenes, the story starts in the Lebendorf star system where Faraway's squadron is ambushed by ADAN forces. Losing a pilot, the squadron fights its way out, along with its mother ship Acropolis. The attacking force is later revealed to be part of a larger invasion fleet. After defending the planet from the invaders and cruise missiles, Lebendorf is evacuated and the TCAF retreats from the system. As Faraway and his team retreat, the fleeing civilians are attacked by ADAN forces, this time led by Margras Mason. Though having the opportunity to kill Faraway, Mason spares him on account of their friendship, though warns him to leave the military or be killed on their next encounter. Acropolis withdraws to the planet Hargenteen where the TCAF is massing against ADAN's onslaught.

After repairs, the carrier joins a task force on a mission, attacking deep into the enemy's territory to draw away part of ADAN's fleet. The task force commander, however, fell for an ambush. Panicking, he orders a retreat, abandoning the Acropolis, which was investigating nearby Acheron. While defending the carrier, Faraway shoots down Mason's fighter. Landing where Mason crashed, Faraway engages him in a fistfight and learns the story behind Acheron's devastation. After Mason's rescue by ADAN, Faraway returns to Acropolis. The mothership retreats to Hargateen and rejoins its defenders, holding off several waves of ADAN attacks. Then Egan arrives with her superweapon, the Promethus Driver, and destroys most of the TCAF defenders and several ADAN ships with a single shot that also devastates the planet's surface. Too few to mount an effective assault against ADAN, the remaining TCAF ships, including Acropolis, retreat to Earth. Bent on revenge, Egan announces Earth as ADAN's next target despite Mason's heavy disapproval.

Scouting ahead of ADAN's main force, Mason's squadron is challenged and destroyed by Faraway's fighters. Mason is captured and Faraway persuades him to defect; the TCAF learns the weakness of the Promethus Driver from Mason. In the final battle, Mason flies alongside Faraway, destroying many of ADAN's ships and sacrificing himself to clear a way for his friend to reach the Promethus Driver's firing mechanism. Faraway destroys the mechanism, causing the superweapon to implode and form a gravity well. His ship fails to escape the well's pull and loses power; however, Mason's spirit appears and restarts the Delta Saber, helping Faraway to escape. The post-credits scene shows Faraway and Bernstein, as they stand together on a revitalized Acheron.

== Development ==
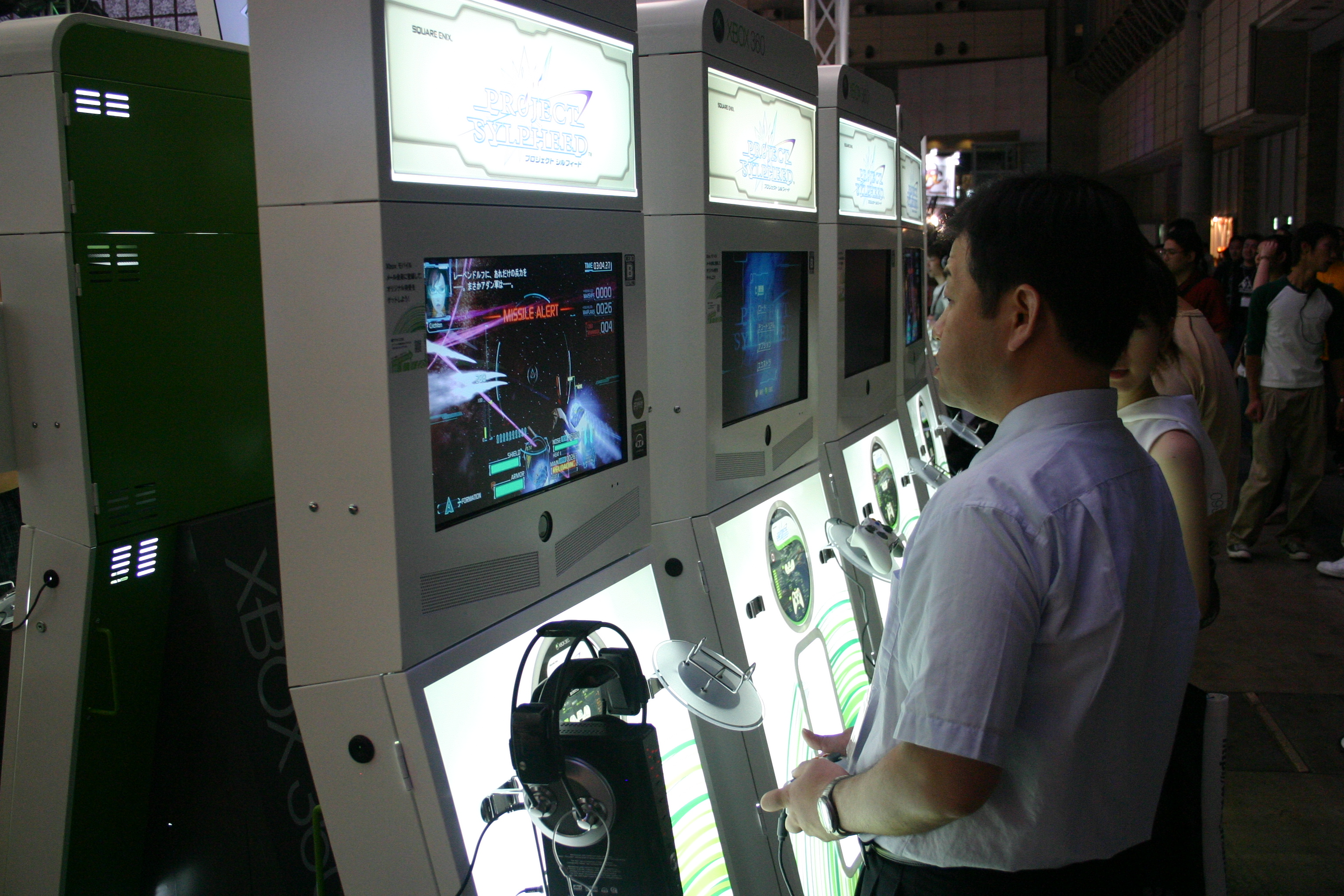
Project Sylpheed was unveiled to the public at Tokyo Games Show 2006

Project Sylpheed was first announced by Square Enix to be in development in April 2006. The video games publisher proclaimed at an Xbox 360 conference in Tokyo, Japan, that the game was the company's first exclusive title for the Microsoft game console. This was part of Enix's strategy to diversify its market, spreading its interests among the Xbox 360, PlayStation 3, and Wii. Initially titled Project Sylph, the game was renamed Project Sylpheed for a more obvious connection with its predecessor, Silpheed. The original game, first released in 1986, was a rail shooter rendered with 2D computer graphics; dodging and shooting at incoming enemies, the player's starship moved around a playing field that scrolled vertically. Enix also credited Game Arts, the company that had created Silpheed, as the developers of Project Sylpheed.

Game Arts's presence on the project, however, was more of a supervisory role. Project Sylpheed was conceived and developed by SETA's Ikusabune team, which comprised former Game Arts employees who had worked on the Silpheed series. The team intended to use the latest technology at the time to produce a sequel to Silpheed. The new game would allow player characters to move anywhere in a three-dimensional playing arena, instead of restricting them to fixed paths as in standard rail shooters. Computer graphics studio, Anima, was brought in to develop the game's story and characters, creating the animated cut scenes that are interspersed among the missions. The product of this collaboration was showcased at Tokyo Game Show 2006; journalists had fun with the space shooter, commenting that its controls and learning curve were simpler than those of space flight simulators.

Project Sylpheed was first released in Japan on 28 September 2006; Square Enix published the game with only Japanese text and audio. Microsoft Game Studios handled the releases for Europe and North America, localizing Project Sylpheed for the English-speaking market. Voice actors of the Western anime industry were brought in; Vic Mignogna—whose credits included Fullmetal Alchemist and Super Dimension Fortress Macross—voiced Faraway, and Kari Wahlgren—who voiced characters in Blood+ and Final Fantasy XII—provided Bernstein's voice. A demo of the game, providing a single mission and a small selection of the weapons in the retail version, was available for downloading over Xbox Live on 14 June 2007, and the game went on sale outside Japan two weeks later. On 25 July the same year, the game's downloadable content was made available for free on Xbox Live.

== Reception ==
Reception

Aggregate score
Aggregator	Score
Metacritic	64/100

Review scores
Publication	Score
1Up.com	B
Eurogamer	7/10
Game Informer	7.75/10
GameSpot	5.5/10
GameTrailers	6.5/10
GameZone	7.2/10
IGN	5.9/10
Official Xbox Magazine (UK)	50
Official Xbox Magazine (US)	55
PALGN	7.0/10
TeamXbox	59
VideoGamer.com	7/10

Project Sylpheed received mixed reviews, with critics praising the core shooting but criticizing the repetition, lack of depth, and story.

G4TV's reviewer, David Francis Smith, said that the game's designers had "no idea how to create structured, intelligible action in such a big area". Several of his colleagues agreed, finding the game flawed in the design of its missions. They were disappointed that most missions, in the words of Xbox World's Michael Gapper, tasked them to "fly, shoot, rearm, [and] shoot more" endlessly. Reviewers were also irked that they were not informed about the secondary objectives in a mission; the goals were only revealed after the reviewers had completed them unawares. Further frustration arose from the fact that certain time limits were only displayed on nearing expiration. Other reviewers had no qualms with these flaws, stating that the intense dogfights more than compensate such shortcomings; Game Informer's Andrew Reiner wrote that the "rewarding quick-trigger combat and thrill of overcoming the worst of odds makes Project Sylpheed a memorable play for gamers who daydream of galaxies far, far away".

In Project Sylpheed, starfighters and missiles leave colorful contrails in their wake as they move through the void of space, and explode into fireballs when destroyed. The graphics impressed several critics; in his article for Play magazine, Dave Halverson called the game "by far the prettiest free-roaming shooter ever created". Other reviewers felt the effects were not outstanding; IGN's Erik Brudvig said the explosions looked like "bloody snot". Finding the maelstrom of color contrails distracting, Justin Hoeger wrote in his article for The Sacramento Bee that he was dogfighting "garish, neon-colored contrails" instead of enemy fighters, a sentiment shared by several others. Will Freeman of VideoGamer.com in contrast appreciated the contrails for filling the emptiness of space with "tangled webs of gently shimmering blue and red" and found them useful as "a way of tracking [his] enemies".

Certain reviewers had negative experiences with the game caused by other factors. They had difficulty picking out enemies, which were small or fleeting targets because of their distance or speed, among a "haze of microscopic heads-up labels". Chris Dahlen of The A.V. Club criticized the game for forcing the player to constantly focus on the instruments to locate targets, thus breaking the illusion of dogfighting in a spacefighter. Other reviewers had a hard time with the game's controls, finding them too complex; those who mastered the controls could perform deft maneuvers with their starfighters. Another disappointment for reviewers was Project Sylpheed's failure to provide a game mode that they and their friends could play together online.

The weaving of a storyline with its missions made Project Sylpheed unique; shooters rarely did so. TeamXbox's Andy Eddy called the story "absolutely the best part of the game", and several of his colleagues agreed. The focus on relationships made it more complex and easier to relate to than those found in other shooters, and Halverson praised the game for lacing a "mission-based space opera" with "real emotion". Again, differing opinions are not uncommon; Hardcore Gamer's Thomas Wilde was disappointed to find the game akin to an exaggerated science-fiction soap opera. Others found the story clichéd and uninteresting, especially for those who have watched plenty of "Japanese video game drama". According to Dahlen, it is a "story of warring fleets of strippers and Muppet-boys determined to wipe each other out of the galaxy". Gapper wished that the story's cutscenes stop interrupting his enjoyment of shooting the enemies.

Overall, critical reactions of the game were varied; its features did not have universal appeal. Wilde argued that only rabid fans of the themes incorporated in Project Sylpheed would be interested in the game. His colleague, Geson Hatchett, felt the game would have been better as a rail shooter with 3D graphics. The general sentiment among reviewers was that Project Sylpheed could not spark a revival of interest in a long-dying genre regardless of whatever qualities it may have. Despite receiving such reactions, Project Sylpheed sold enough copies (as judged by Microsoft) in Japan within the first nine months of its release to become part of Xbox 360's Platinum Collection on November 1, 2007.
