= Faria: A World of Mystery and Danger! =

1989 video game

Faria: A World of Mystery and Danger
- North American cover art
- Developer: Game Arts
- Publishers: JP: Hi-Score; NA: Nexoft Corporation
- Platform: Nintendo Entertainment System
- Release: JP: July 21, 1989; NA: June 1991
- Genre: Action role-playing
- Mode: Single-player

Faria: A World of Mystery and Danger!, known in Japan as Faria Fuuin no Tsurugi (ファリア 封印の剣; lit. "Faria: Sealed Sword"), is an action role-playing game (RPG) for the Nintendo Entertainment System. It was developed by Game Arts, published in Japan by Hi-Score in 1989 and by Nexoft in North America in 1991.

== Story ==
The game begins with the protagonist, identified as a female soldier from a foreign country, waking up in an inn in the Kingdom of Faria. The soldier quickly learns that an evil being known as the Wizard has kidnapped the princess of Faria, and the king has offered the princess's hand in marriage to anyone able to rescue her. The soldier travels to the tower where the princess is held, defeats the monsters within, and returns the princess safely. The King laments the fact that the protagonist is a woman and cannot marry the princess, and decides to throw a party to celebrate the princess's return instead. It soon becomes apparent that the food given away by the king at the party was poisoned by a mysterious man, and the soldier has to travel to a faraway town to obtain medicine for the townspeople.

The soldier eventually obtains the cure and delivers it to the sick townspeople, only to discover that in her absence the king had been transformed into stone. The princess informs her that the only way to restore the king is to defeat the one who cast the spell, so the soldier sets out once again. After an arduous journey across the northern continent and a land set in the clouds, the Soldier reaches the town of Zellia where an old man informs her that the princess is an impostor. The Wizard kidnapped the princess, transformed himself into the princess's double, allowed himself to be "rescued" by the soldier, poisoned the townspeople, and turned the king to stone all in a bid to steal Faria's royal scrolls. The old man gives the soldier a Crystal of Truth so that she may enter the Phantom Tower, a tower projecting five identical fake images that confound anyone trying to enter. Using the crystal, the soldier manages to enter the real tower and destroy the monster within, discovering that it was guarding the real princess. The pair returns to confront the fake princess, where the Wizard sheds his disguise and attacks the soldier. The soldier defeats the Wizard, only for the Wizard to use the power of the royal scrolls to begin transferring his spirit into the body of a dragon.

Though his spirit escaped, the destruction of the Wizard's body lifts the curse on the king; additionally, in a flash of light the soldier is transformed into a man, revealing himself to be the prince of a frontier kingdom whose men had been turned into women by the Wizard. Before anyone can celebrate the lifting of the curses, the Wizard's spirit uses its power to block out the sun, shrouding the world in darkness. The prince sets out to kill the dragon before the Wizard's spirit is able to completely merge with it, passing through a series of icy caves that surround the Final Tower where the dragon's body resides. Discovering a legendary sword within the tower, the prince uses its power to defeat the dragon and seal the Wizard's spirit within the sword. Having restored the world, the prince returns to the king, who asks the prince to stay and offers the princess's hand in marriage. The prince declines, needing to return to his own country, but the princess asks to go with him and the king consents. The pair return to the prince's country together, and scenes from the protagonist's journey are shown as the game ends.

== Gameplay ==
Faria is an action role-playing game in which the player controls a sword-wielding hero, with a number of similarities to The Legend of Zelda. As with many RPGs, the game is broken into towns, an overworld, and dungeons. Activities in town include talking to non-player characters to gather information and items, traversing the overworld involves combat that takes place on a separate battle screen, while dungeons consist of combat in the same window used to navigate and puzzling through increasingly complex mazes. Combat consists of moving the player character's sprite around the screen while swinging its equipped sword or using a handful of items including bombs and a bow & arrows.

== Development ==
Faria was one of Game Arts' first RPGs, for which the company would later become known through series such as Grandia and Lunar. The game was an early project for Takeshi Miyaji, Yoshito Asari, designer for the Lunar games and director of the first two Grandia games, and Akihiko Yoshida, designer and illustrator on the first two Ogre Battle games and several Squaresoft properties.

== Reception ==
Nintendo Power gave Faria only a short, half-page piece of coverage. It rated the game a 3.7 out of 5 on "Theme and Fun".

GamePro had a two page spread on Faria. It gave the game a score of 3 out of 5 for graphics, sound, gameplay, and fun factor, and a 5 out of 5 for challenge. The review erroneously stated that the game was released in Japan 7 years before the publication date.
