= Caritas Macau =

Charity outreach of the Diocese of Macau, China

Coordinates: 22°11′32.77″N 113°32′16.54″E

- Established: 1951; 75 years ago
- Location: Largo de Sto. Agostinho, 1-A, Macau, China
- Founder: Luis Ruiz Suarez
- Director: Paul, Pun Chi Meng
- Previously: Casa Ricci Social Services
- Main organ: Cáritas Ligação (Connection)
- Affiliations: Catholic Diocese of Macau; Caritas International
- Staff: 800
- Website: CaritasMacau

Caritas Macau
- Traditional Chinese: 澳門明愛
- Simplified Chinese: 澳门明爱
Transcriptions
Standard Mandarin
- Hanyu Pinyin: Àomén Míng Ài
Yue: Cantonese
- Jyutping: ou3 mun4*2 ming4 oi3

Caritas Macau is the charity outreach of the Catholic Diocese of Macau, Macau, China. It began in 1951 as an outgrowth of the charitable works of Luis Ruiz Suarez SJ, and his Casa Ricci Social Services.

== Origin ==
In 1971 the Jesuit priest Luis Ruiz Suarez enlisted the support of Caritas Macau, with help from Caritas International, to take Ricci Center for Social Services under its umbrella. while he continued to extend the outreach of both. Casa Ricci Social Services became an independent division of Caritas.

== New works ==
The efforts of the Casa Ricci division remained focused on work among lepers and then AIDS victims throughout China, while Caritas Macau began increasing programs in Macau, founding Family Casework & Assistance Service, Our Lady of Mt. Carmel Home for the Elderly, and St. Luis Gonzaga Center for the Disabled. In 1977 Caritas founded Macau's first social work institute to train social workers. Also in the 1970s it founded Caritas Women Centre, the Brito School, a driving course for the physically handicapped, and Life Hope Hot Line.

Caritas Macau took over management of the Canossian Sisters' St. Francis Xavier Home for the Elderly and opened day care facilities for the elderly in Largo de S. Agostinho, Ilha Verde, and Taipa Island. It began managing St. Lucia Centre and St. Margaret Centre for the handicapped, and founded a school for those with mental disabilities.

== Increased structure ==
The 1980s had seen rapid urbanization in Macau. In the 1990s, the administrative structure of Caritas Macau was enhanced. Fr. Ruiz remained superintendent and received the help of a secretary general, general assembly, supervisory board, executive committee, and consultants. Services to diverse groups continued: the homeless, ex-prisoners, youth, the elderly, and kindergarten and nursery schools.

An economic crisis in 1997 and massive unemployment led the Macau Social Welfare Bureau to enlist the help of Caritas Macau along with three other NGOs in a Community Employment Assistance Programme in the mid-2000s. In 2005 Caritas opened a performing arts program for young people, Teatro Clementina Leitão Ho Brito, to enhance their spiritual and cultural values. In 2007 the care home Rising Sun Areia Preta was opened for people with physical disabilities. In 2009 the large Centro de Santa Margarida was opened in the village of Cheok Ka, Taipa, to consolidate other services and assist in training rehabilitation caregivers. And Hip Lek began transporting the disabled, especially those in wheelchairs, between Macau and Hong Kong.

In 2010 Mother Mary Social Studies Center was opened for research and action in the field of social work. A refugee welfare service followed in 2011, and a food bank opened the same year. Also in 2011 the day center Brilho da Vida opened, to enrich the lives of the elderly and to increase their independent living capability. It provides the elderly and infirm with housework assistance and 24/7 emergency support. In 2012 this program was expanded with the Macau Foundation Project for the homebound elderly. Other programs reach out to single parents and their children. In 2013 the Philippine Consulate in Macau and Caritas-Macau signed a memorandum of agreement to jointly assist overseas Filipino workers to integrate into their work environment and Macau society.

Caritas Macau had grown to include 34 centres spread throughout Macau, the most densely populated region in the world. Its food bank had 2,200 families who drew support from it as needed, about 1% of all families in Macau. Caritas is regarded as the number one non-profit service association in Macau and a popular charity.

The focus of Caritas Macau is the densely populated city. Casa Ricci Social Services has rather as its focus all of China, and beyond. At Ricci's death in 2011, the independently chartered Ricci Social Service Foundation, which runs Casa Ricci Social Services, was running 50 programs distributed in 13 provinces of China with 64 leprosy centers for a total of 4,000 patients and 5 HIV homes with a total of 300 HIV-positive mothers and other adults. It was also caring for 1500 students from poor families.
