= Silpheed: The Lost Planet =

2000 video game

- Japanese version cover art
- Developers: Treasure, Game Arts
- Publishers: JP: Capcom; NA: Working Designs; EU: Swing! Entertainment
- Directors: Masato Maegawa; Kanta Watanabe
- Producer: Takeshi Miyaji
- Designers: Kazuo Yasuda; Toshio Akashi
- Programmers: Naoto Niida; Masaki Ukyo; Kazuhiko Ishida; Kanta Watanabe
- Artists: Seiji Hasuko; Tsunehisa Kanagae; Tetsuhiko Kikuchi; Kōji Kitatani
- Composers: Fumihito Kasatani; Mariko Sato; Tomy; Yoko Sonoda
- Platform: PlayStation 2
- Release: JP: September 21, 2000; NA: April 10, 2001; EU: May 11, 2001
- Genre: Vertical-scrolling shooter
- Mode: Single-player

Silpheed: The Lost Planet (Note: Japanese: シルフィード ザ・ロストプラネット, Hepburn: Shirufīdo Za Rosuto Puranetto) is a 2000 shooter video game. It is a direct sequel to Silpheed. It was developed by Treasure and Game Arts, and published in North America by Working Designs. The game is a vertical scrolling shooter in which the player controls 019, a Silpheed of the planet Solont's SA-77 Squadron, as it takes on countless alien enemies.

== Gameplay ==
The Silpheed destroying formations of enemies in the first level.

Silpheed: The Lost Planet is a vertical-scrolling shooter presented at an oblique angle view. The plot takes place 31 years after the events of the first game, where most human colonies in the Solar System have been destroyed by an alien civilization named the UTOO. To prevent the UTOO from destroying the remaining colonies, as well as other celestial bodies within the universe, a squadron of starfighters known as Silpheeds are deployed to destroy the UTOO and restore peace to the universe.

The player controls one of these Silpheed ships throughout eight stages. The objective of each is to make it to the end by destroying formations of enemies and avoiding collision with them and their projectiles. At the beginning of a level, the player can customize their Silpheed with different types of weapons, including short-ranged bombs, a double shot, and a laser that pierces through enemies. These weapons can be attached to either wing of the Silpheed, allowing for one side to have one weapon and the other side to have a different one. Brief "refueling" segments midway through levels allow players to swap their weapon types. Destroying enemies close to the player increases the score multiplier, referred to as "proximity scoring", and increases the closer the player is to an enemy.

== Release ==
The game was released in Japan on September 21, 2000 for the PlayStation 2.

North American publisher Working Designs made changes to the game. Support for analog control and vibration functionality was added. The slowdown from the Japanese version was almost completely eliminated as well. The game's Western packaging also features a foil-embossed, reflective cover. Originally, it had been scheduled for October 26, 2000, but it had been delayed to November 24 first, before delaying it further to April 2001.

== Reception ==
Reception

Aggregate score
Aggregator	Score
Metacritic	72/100

Review scores
Publication	Score
AllGame	3/5
Edge	3/10
Electronic Gaming Monthly	6.67/10 (Note: Two critics of Electronic Gaming Monthly gave the game each a score of 7/10, and another gave it 6/10 in an early review.)
Eurogamer	8/10
Famitsu	29/40
Game Informer	6/10
GameFan	73% (Note: In GameFan's viewpoint of the Japanese import, three critics gave it each a score of 74, 76, and 68.) (ECM) 58%
GameSpot	6.8/10
IGN	8.3/10
Next Generation	2/5
Official U.S. PlayStation Magazine	3.5/5
X-Play	4/5

The game received "average" reviews according to the review aggregation website Metacritic. Blake Fischer of NextGen said in an early review that the game had "got the look, but it's lacking the inspiration that makes a shooter stand out." In Japan, Famitsu gave it a score of 29 out of 40. Game Informer gave the Japanese version a mixed review, about six months before the game was released Stateside. Other magazines gave early reviews as well while it was still in development.
