= Silpheed =

1986 video game

- Developers: Game Arts (PC-88, FM, Sega CD); Sierra On-Line (IIGS, CoCo, MS-DOS)
- Publishers: Game Arts (PC-88, FM); Sierra On-Line (IIGS, CoCo, MS-DOS); Sega (Sega CD)
- Director: Takeshi Miyaji
- Producers: Yoichi Miyaji; Toshiyuki Uchida
- Designers: Takeshi Miyaji; Masakuni Mitsuhashi; Osamu Harada
- Programmers: Satoshi Uesaka; Nia Necoyama; Akira Eye; Tomoyuki Shimada
- Artists: Satoshi Uesaka; Nobuyuki Ogawa; Akira Eye
- Composers: Fumihito Kasatani; Nobuyuki Aoshima; Masakuni Mitsuhashi; Hibiki Godai
- Platforms: PC-8801mkII SR, FM-77AV, Apple IIGS, TRS-80 Color Computer, MS-DOS, Sega CD
- Release: December 5, 1986: PC-88; JP: December 5, 1986 FM-77AV; JP: March 3, 1988 IIGS, CoCo; NA: 1988 MS-DOS; NA: 1989 Sega CD; JP: July 7, 1993; EU: September 1993; NA: October 1993
- Genre: Third-person shooter
- Mode: Single-player

Silpheed (Japanese: シルフィード, Hepburn: Shirufīdo) is a video game developed by Game Arts and designed by Takeshi Miyaji. It made its debut on the Japanese PC-8801 in 1986, and was ported to the FM-7 and MS-DOS soon after. It was later remade for the Sega CD and has a sequel called Silpheed: The Lost Planet for the PlayStation 2.

Silpheed is the name of the spacecraft that the player controls, and is most likely derived from the famous ballet, La Sylphide. Like many shooter games, the story involves using the Silpheed as Earth's last effort to save itself from destruction by a powerful enemy invasion. The original 1986 PC-88 version used 3D polygonal graphics on top of a tilted third-person backdrop. The 1993 Sega CD version later used pre-rendered computer animation as a full motion video background, a technique previously used by the Namco System 21 arcade game Galaxian 3.

== Gameplay ==
Screenshot of the PC-88 version

Silpheed is a vertical-scrolling shooter video game. It is presented at an oblique view camera angle, with enemies and other objects becoming smaller as they move towards the top of the screen. The player assumes the role of a starship named the SA-08 Silpheed, deployed by the Yggdrassil supercomputer to destroy the Xacalite terrorist organization. The Silpheed can freely move about the screen. In each level, the player is tasked with destroying various enemies while avoiding their projectiles. By shooting down red-colored orbs found throughout levels, the player can acquire one of five different weapon types, each with their own unique behavior and strengths; these include homing missiles, an auto-aiming shot, and a "phalanx" spread-shot laser. Weapons can be attached to either side of the Silpheed.

== Release ==
A Sega CD prototype of the game with fewer enemies was shown at the Winter Consumer Electronics Show in January 1993.

== Ports ==
The original Silpheed game was created for the PC-8801, and released on December 5, 1986. Another version for the FM-7 was released on March 3, 1988. In the same year, the game was brought to the United States for the first time by Sierra On-Line who ported the game to DOS and other platforms. The DOS version (1.0) released in April 1989. Later in the same year, the version 2.3 has added Game Blaster soundcard support and bundled with Game Blaster soundcards.

In 1989, Sierra On-Line also ported Silpheed to the Apple IIGS, which supported the same 640x200 graphics modes of the original NEC PC-8801 version, and its full musical score (based on the Roland MT-32 soundtrack from the DOS version) using its 15-voice Ensoniq sound chip.

The storyline is set in the future (no date is specified, but 3032 is referred to as the date when an alien ship was discovered that led to rapid technological advancement and allowed humans to colonize outer space) a terrorist named Xacalite has stolen "planetary buster" missiles and a battleship named Gloire. The fleet is not close enough to Earth to get there before Xacalite destroys it, so the supercomputer Yggdrassil orders the experimental SA-08 Silpheed fighter, a prototype, to be used to destroy Gloire.

=== Sega CD ===
The Sega CD port of Silpheed places polygon ships over a pre-rendered video background; this method is also seen in other video game titles, like Namco's Galaxian 3 in 1990 and StarBlade in 1991, Sony Imagesoft's Bram Stoker's Dracula in 1992, and Micronet's A/X-101 in 1994 for the Sega CD.

The game's story concerns a space war campaign when terrorists—led by a man named Xacalite—hack into the mother computer of Earth, granting them control over all the space weaponry of the Solar System. The Earth's only hope is a small fleet outside the computer's reach, provided with a squadron of SA-77 Silpheed dogfighters (referred to as "prototypes" in the manual for the PC version). In the ending credits sequence of this version, there are cinematic animations of scenes depicting the fighters flying through stages in the game.

== Reception ==
Reception

Review scores
| Publication | Score |
|---|---|
| ACE | 905/1000 (DOS) |
| AllGame | 4.5/5 (Sega CD); 3/5 (DOS) |
| Computer and Video Games | 85% (Sega CD) |
| Dragon | 5/5 (DOS) |
| Electronic Gaming Monthly | 9/10, 7/10, 7/10, 7/10 (Sega CD) |
| Famitsu | 8/10, 8/10, 8/10, 7/10 (Sega CD) |
| Mega | 89% (Sega CD) |
| MegaTech | 94% (Sega CD) |

Award
| Publication | Award |
|---|---|
| MegaTech | Hyper Game |

In 1989, Dragon gave the DOS version of the game 5 out of 5 stars, concluding that "Silpheed is highly addictive, extremely colorful, and requires hours of enjoyable practice to master". Computer Gaming World gave the same version a positive review, praising the original music for the game. The British gaming magazine ACE gave the game a score of 905 out of 1000. Compute! called Silpheed "classic arcade fun with a little more depth than you'll find in many action-oriented games", but criticized the simple sound effects.

The four reviewers of Electronic Gaming Monthly found it to be a "rather mundane" and "simple shooter", but the "gameplay is solid" and the backgrounds are "some of the most stunning visuals in a video game". However, they criticized the unimpressive bosses, mediocre powerups and especially the lack of reciprocal interaction with the backgrounds as the game's biggest problems.

Mega placed the game at #5 in their Top Mega-CD Games of All Time, MegaTech magazine said the game was "undoubtedly one of the best games yet for the Mega-CD". This version of the game was a bestseller in Japan. The Sega CD version was a runner-up for GamePro's 1993 CD Game of the Year award.

Contemporary European publications regarded Silpheed as a technical showcase for the Mega-CD. British trade magazine Music Week described it as the second most technically impressive game released for the system at the time, behind Thunderhawk, while French magazine Consoles+ awarded it 93%.

== Legacy ==
A sequel was released, Silpheed: The Lost Planet, for the PlayStation 2 in 2000. It was developed by Game Arts alongside Treasure.

A space combat simulator game was released by Square Enix in 2006 for the Xbox 360 titled Project Sylpheed. It is not directly tied into the Silpheed storyline, but was instead billed as a spiritual successor.

In 2012, an app for Android, called Silpheed Alternative: Menace From Beyond the Stars was made, also considered as a spiritual successor. Like Project Sylpheed, it is a fully three-dimensional game.
