= Mary Simpson (priest) =

Mary Michael Simpson (December 1, 1925 – July 20, 2011) was an American minister. In 1977, she became one of the first women to be ordained a priest by the American Episcopal Church and was the first woman to hold the office of canon.

== Life and career ==
Born in Evansville, Indiana, Simpson grew up in Texas City, Texas. She was raised a Methodist but in her senior year of college she became an Episcopalian. She subsequently entered the New York School for Deaconesses and Other Church Workers in New York City from which she graduated in 1949. After graduation she spent six years as a missionary to Liberia. Upon her return to the United States, she became a religious sister and took her life vows with the Order of Saint Helena in Vails Gate, New York in 1956. She was soon after appointed the head of a girls' school operated by the order, Margaret Hall in Versailles, Kentucky, where she remained for about a decade. She then returned to the convent in Vails Gate to become director of novices.

In 1973 Simpson became actively involved in the women's movement in the Episcopal Church for the first time after a proposal to allow women priests in the church had been defeated. She had previously not been a vocal advocate for the role of women in the church, although she had privately supported the ordination of women. In 1974 she was appointed a deacon at the Cathedral of St. John the Divine in New York City and spent the next three years on the staff of that church working as a pastoral counselor.

In 1977, Simpson became one of the first women to be ordained a priest in the American Episcopal Church, the first religious sister to be ordained, and the first female canon. She was the first ordained woman to preach at Westminster Abbey when she visited London in April 1978. At that time, the Church of England had not approved the ordination of women. Simpson's visit brought together Anglican groups in favor of women's ordination and led to the founding of the Movement for the Ordination of Women.

Simpson died in Augusta, Georgia in 2011 at the age of 85.
