= Sons of Merciful Love =

Catholic religious congregation

Congregation of the Sons of Merciful Love
- Congregatio Filiorum Amoris Misericordis
- Abbreviation: Post-nominal letters: F.A.M.
- Established: August 15, 1951; 74 years ago
- Founder: Sister Esperanza Jesus Alhama Valera
- Type: Clerical Religious Congregation of Pontifical Right (for Men)
- Headquarters: 06050 Collevalenza, Perugia, Italy
- Members: 114 members (92 priests) as of 2018
- Superior General: Fr. Aurelio Pérez Garcia, FAM
- Countries present: Italy, Spain Brazil and Germany
- Ministry: support of the diocesan clergy, works of charity and social work
- Parent organization: Roman Catholic Church
- Website: www.amormisericordioso.org

The Congregation of the Sons of Merciful Love (Latin: Congregatio Filiorum Amoris Misericordis) is a Catholic clerical religious congregation of Pontifical Right for men, founded in Rome in 1951 and approved by Pope John Paul II on June 12, 1983. Its members add the post-nominals FAM to their names to indicate membership in the Congregation.

== History ==
The Congregation was founded in Rome by the Spanish Sister Esperanza Jesus Alhama Valera (September 30, 1893 - April 2, 1983) on August 15, 1951, when three novices made their profession of faith. On August 18, 1951, Alfonso Maria de Sanctis, Bishop of Todi, hosted the community within his jurisdiction, in the hamlet of Collevalenza. Since that time other houses have been opened in Matrice and Fermo, and in 1963 in Lujua (diocese of Bilbao).

The Sons of Merciful Love were raised to the status of a religious congregation under diocesan direction by a decree of Norberto Perini, Archbishop of Fermo, on July 28, 1968. The Holy See approved the Congregation as an institute by a decree of June 12, 1983.

On December 31, 2018, the Congregation had 19 houses, 114 members (92 priests).

The Congregation's priests are dedicated to the support and the sanctification of the diocesan clergy and also to charity and social work. They work in Brazil, Germany, Italy and Spain. The seat of the Congregation's head is in the Sanctuary of Merciful Love (Italian: Santuario dell'Amore Misericordioso) in Collevalenza (Perugia).

=== Bishops ===
- Domenico Cancian, bishop of Città di Castello, Italy.
- Armando Martín Gutiérrez, bishop of Bacabal, Brazil.
