= Ghen War =

1995 video game

- Japanese box art of Ghen War
- Developer: Jumpin' Jack Software
- Publishers: Sega (North America); Virgin Interactive Entertainment (Japan & Europe)
- Designer: Robert Leyland
- Artist: Jenny Martin
- Composer: Brian Coburn
- Platform: Saturn
- Release: NA: 1995; JP: April 26, 1996; EU: June 28, 1996
- Genre: First-person shooter
- Mode: Single player

Ghen War (ゲン ウォー) is a first-person shooter video game for the Sega Saturn console. It was developed by American studio Jumpin' Jack Software and published by Sega in 1995. The game centers around a member of a mining crew, with an artificial powered exoskeleton resembling a power-loader. The crew, specifically the protagonist, must fight off a once-friendly alien race known as the Ghen, who suddenly turn on the humans.

== Story ==
The game takes place in the future, years after an armada of aliens known as the Ghen made contact with human beings. The Ghen are seeking refuge from a bloody inter-galactic war with a super race known as the Bo-Kyat. In exchange for their aid, human beings were given major advances in science and technology, including bionic implant devices that make them immune to all disease. The Ghen also assist humans in locating materials on other planets through the creation of the Sunstar Solar Exploration Station.

The exploration team, composed of humans led by a man named Jenners and Ghen led by Commander Xylan, is harvesting minerals on Titan when the story begins. For reasons unknown, Xylan orders his Ghen to enter their spacecraft and take off. Boxhead, an android scientist, informs Jenner that there is stronium activity (not to be confused with strontium) nearby. After hearing that the Ghen have left, Jenner orders everyone back to the ship, including the 'Lieutenant' (the player character), in his exoskeleton.

The human team (including their pilot Gina and wise-cracking Akira) take off in their own ship, the Da Vinci, and try to make contact with the Sunstar station. The Ghen attack and destroy the station before turning their attention to the human ship. The humans escape and begin disabling Ghen stronium reactors and thwarting their attacks, with the help of the Lieutenant and his exoskeleton.

The Ghen blame the crew of the Da Vinci for destroying Sunstar and Titan and invading Mars, and use human figureheads under their control like Commander Braxton to try to trick them into returning to Earth for disciplinary action. The Da Vinci realize their deception. Relay Commander Reynolds (their only contact due to the interstellar communications blackout) informs them that the starship Goliath is dry-docked on Moonbase 12. After returning from the Moon, they wire Boxhead into the ship's communication systems to send a transmission directly to Earth, only to find Reynolds has also fallen under Xylan's control. After Xylan's transmission is intercepted by Wilson, now leading an underground resistance against the Ghen, they discover the Ghen are using the implants to sedate everyone on Earth. They head for the implant manufacturing plant in Australia to liberate the sedated humans.

The game has multiple endings. In the best ending, the player and the crew of the Da Vinci score a major victory against the Ghen. The Ghen take a few hundred captive humans with them as they retreat from the Earth. The crew of the Da Vinci are hailed as heroes, and given medals and a Ghen ship capable of lightspeed. In prison, Xylan explains they were using humanity to test their only means of stopping the Bo-Kyat, which would have made them all slaves to the Ghen's war machines, but by blindingly clinging to the notions of freedom and independence, humanity has sealed its own doom. As the crewman questioning him and the player are left to wonder which of them will be proven right, the crew excitedly take off in their new ship.

== Gameplay ==
Ghen War is a 3D first-person shooter that takes place from within a powered loader, equipped with various tools / weapons which it uses to fight off the Ghen. Most of the game's information and HUD are displayed along the roll-bar of the hyper-suit.

The game features 20 levels in six different locations, including Venus, Mars, Deimos, and the moon. There are also two locations on Earth: Australia and NORAD.

Among its guns and missiles, the hyper-suit has unique features such as a claw-manipulator and the ability to cast a decoy suit, which attracts enemy attention.

Ghen War features an early example of deformable terrain. Firing weapons into a mountain causes the mountain to wear away, much like explosions would cause craters and similar effects.

== Audio and visuals ==
The story of Ghen War is told through a series of cut-scenes, done mostly in full motion video.

The soundtrack of the game was written by Brian Coburn, and it changes dynamically to meet the action taking place within the level.

== Reception ==
Reception

Review scores
Publication	Score
AllGame	4/5
Electronic Gaming Monthly	4.875/10
Famitsu	7/10, 4/10, 7/10, 6/10
GameRevolution	C+
Next Generation	3/5
Sega Saturn Magazine	78%

Ghen War was released in Japan for the Sega Saturn on April 26, 1996.

Ghen War divided critics, who expressed contradicting opinions on most of the game's major aspects. While Andrew Baran, Mike LeFebvre, and Mike Desmond of Electronic Gaming Monthly said the gameplay consists of aimless wandering "with no goals or point", reviewers for Next Generation and Sega Saturn Magazine asserted that the varied mission objectives and automap give the gameplay greater direction than most games of its type. While GamePro, Next Generation, Game Revolution, and Andrew Baran and Sushi-X of EGM all said the visuals are both technically impressive and an enhancement to the gameplay experience with their contrasting landscapes, Mark LeFebvre of EGM and Rob Allsetter of Sega Saturn Magazine described them as both monotonous and unacceptably poor given the Saturn's capabilities. LeFebvre said the enemies have "no intelligence", but Next Generation contented that "the enemies are smart. Sure, you'll come across some that are more like targets than predators, but it's also not unusual to find an enemy sneaking around behind the crest of a hill in order to attack from some hidden corner." Critics did generally agree that the game's complex controls can be difficult, but disagreed on whether this remains a problem after the initial learning curve is past.

Critics were also divided in their overall assessments of Ghen War. Some concluded that its negative aspects completely outweighed its merits or at best made it a game that only a select few would have the patience needed to appreciate, while others felt that it offers enough enjoyment and sparks of originality to make it worth getting. In 1998, Saturn Power ranked Ghen War 99th on their Top 100 Sega Saturn Games summarizing: "Varied level design and clever gameplay makes Ghen War a more interesting and challenging mission-based Doom-like affair. Although they criticized the slow gameplay.
