= Takeshi Miyaji =

Japanese video game develeper (1965–2011)

- Born: December 22, 1965; Tokyo, Japan
- Died: July 29, 2011 (aged 45)
- Occupation: Video game developer

Takeshi Miyaji (宮路 武, Miyaji Takeshi; December 22, 1965 – July 29, 2011) was a Japanese video game developer who founded the development companies Game Arts (with his brother Yoichi Miyaji) and G-Mode. He was best known as the creator of the Silpheed, GunGriffon, Lunar and Grandia video game series. His work on the Lunar and Grandia series in particular had a major influence on the development of role-playing video games. He was the younger brother of Game Arts' CEO Yoichi Miyaji.

== Biography ==
Takeshi began working programming for ASCII at the age of 15. He wrote a book on how to program while working for ASCII. At the age of 19, he co-founded Game Arts with his brother Yoichi. He was in charge of the Development Department of Game Arts for over the next 16 years. During that time, he acted as producer and director of various Games Arts titles, including Silpheed, GunGriffon and Grandia.

Silpheed (1986) is a shooter game notable for its early use of real-time 3D polygonal graphics and a tilted third-person perspective. He also worked on Lunar: The Silver Star (1992), which was among the earliest role-playing video games to tell an engaging story through its audio and video presentation. After working on its sequel Lunar: Eternal Blue (1994), his most successful and memorable video game would be Grandia (1997), which featured an innovative battle system and a strong story. Grandia is considered one of the strongest role-playing games during the 32-bit era and had two sequels produced. His company Game Arts was also known for producing the early run and gun shooter Thexder (1985).

In 2000, Miyaji left Game Arts and founded G-Mode, a game developing company specializing in the emerging mobile phone market and served as the company's Executive Director.

Takeshi died in 2011 at the age of 45 due to complications after surgery for a brain tumor.

== Works ==
- AX-6 (1982, PC-6001) - Lead Programmer of "Space Enemy"
- SX-2: Doitsu Afurika Sōkō Gundan (1984, PC-6001) - Game Design and Programmer
- Thexder (1985, PC) - Producer
- Silpheed (1986, PC) - Director/Designer
- Faria: A World of Mystery and Danger (1990, NES) - Program Director
- Harakiri (1990, PC) - Director
- Lunar: The Silver Star (1992, Sega CD) - Designer
- Tenka Fubu: Eiyū-tachi no Hōkō (1993, Sega CD) - Director
- Silpheed (1993, Sega CD) - Director/Designer
- Lunar 2: Eternal Blue (1994, Sega CD) - Designer
- GunGriffon (1996, Sega Saturn) - Director
- Grandia (1997, Sega Saturn, PlayStation) - Director
- GunGriffon II (1998, Sega Saturn) - Director
- Grandia II (2000, Dreamcast, PlayStation 2) - Producer/Executive Director
- Silpheed: The Lost Planet (2000, PlayStation 2) - Producer/Planning Producer/3D Engine
