= Adcox Special =

1929 two-seat biplane

The Adcox Special was a two-seat open-cockpit biplane built by the students of the US Adcox Aviation Trade School in 1929, powered by a Kinner K-5 engine of 100 hp (75 kW).

Although only one example was built, the design formed the basis for the Adcox Student Prince that was produced in small numbers later that year.

== See also ==
Related development

- Adcox Student Prince
