= Derek Woodhead =

Australian cricketer

Personal information
- Full name: Derek John Woodhead
- Born: 7 September 1934; Subiaco, Western Australia
- Died: 29 July 2011 (aged 76); Perth, Western Australia
- Batting: Right-handed
- Role: Batsman

Domestic team information
- Years: Team
- 1958/59–1959/60: Western Australia
- Source: Cricinfo, 3 November 2017

Derek John Woodhead (7 September 1934 – 29 July 2011) was an Australian cricketer, teacher, and cricket coach. He played seven first-class matches for Western Australia during the 1958–59 and 1959–60 seasons.

Born at Subiaco in Perth in 1934, Woodhead was educated at Perth Boys' High School in the city. Both of his parents died whilst he was a teenager. Woodhead showed promise as a cricketer whilst at school, and was selected for coaching with Keith Carmody, the coach of the Western Australian state side.

A club cricketer who played first-grade cricket for West Perth, debuting at the level in 1953–54, Woodhead was described as having "sound technique" but without the "run-scoring flair of many of his contemporaries". He scored his debut first-grade century during his second season and developed into an opening batsman. He was also noted as "an excellent fielder" who took "some wonderful catches close to the wicket".

Woodhead's first-class debut came in January 1959. With a number of Western Australia's players away on international duty, he made his debut in a Sheffield Shield match against Victoria at the WACA Ground which started on New Year's Day. He scored 41 runs in his only innings on debut as Western Australia won by an innings, before going on to make an unbeaten century in his second match later the same month. His score of 101 not out was his only first-class century and established Woodhead as a batsman who Wisden described as having "a promising career ahead of him as an opener".

Three low scores for Western Australia at the start of the 1959–60 season, however, meant that Woodhead dropped out of the state side and never regained his place. He continued to play club cricket for West Perth, also playing matches for the Mount Lawley and Scarborough clubs. He was coach at Scarborough for three seasons before moving back to coach at West Perth. Amongst others, he coached fast bowler Mick Malone, who played for Australia, and opening batsman Greg Shipperd.

Professionally Woodhead worked as a teacher. He coached schools cricket, often using research as a basis for his approach to coaching. For his Teachers' Higher Certificate he wrote a thesis entitled Fundamentals and Techniques of Batting in Australia. The work is stored at the J S Battye Library in Perth.

Married with three daughters, Woodhead died at Perth in 2011. He was aged 76.
