= Santokh Singh Matharu =

Kenyan hockey player

Personal information
- Nationality: Kenyan
- Born: 8 March 1942 Punjab, British India
- Died: 21 July 2011 (aged 69) Nairobi, Kenya

Sport
- Sport: Field hockey
- Club: Railway Gymkhana, Nairobi

Santokh Singh Matharu (8 March 1942 – 21 July 2011) was a Kenyan field hockey player. He competed at the 1964 Summer Olympics and the 1968 Summer Olympics.
