= Diocese of Bacabal =

Catholic ecclesiastical territory

Coordinates: 4.2280°S 44.7753°W

Diocese of Bacabal Dioecesis Bacabalensis

Catholic
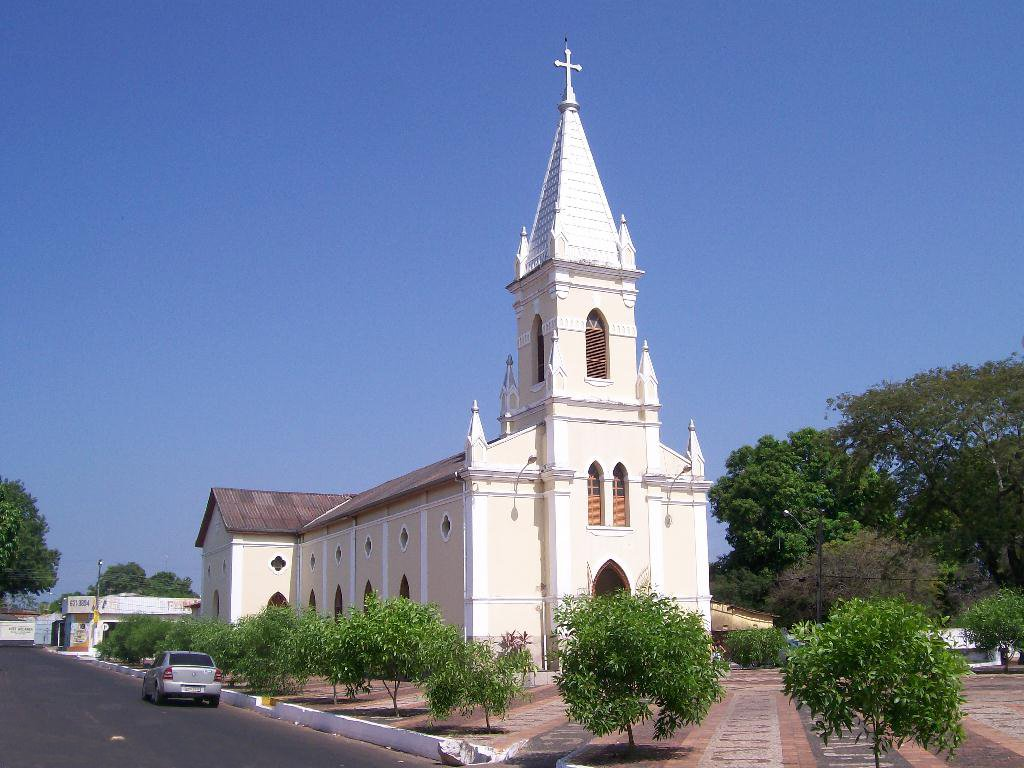
- Santa Teresinha catholic church in Bacabal

Location
- Country: Brazil
- Ecclesiastical province: São Luís do Maranhão

Statistics
- Area: 15,867 km^{2} (6,126 sq mi)
- Population: Total; Catholics: (as of 2006); 502,000; 461,000 (91.8%)

Information
- Rite: Latin Rite
- Established: 22 June 1968 (58 years ago)
- Cathedral: Catedral Santa Terezinha

Current leadership
- Pope: Leo XIV
- Bishop: Armando Martín Gutiérrez, F.A.M.
- Metropolitan Archbishop: Gilberto Pastana de Oliveira

The Roman Catholic Diocese of Bacabal (Latin: Dioecesis Bacabalensis) is a diocese located in the city of Bacabal in the ecclesiastical province of São Luís do Maranhão in Brazil.

== History ==
- 22 June 1968: Established as Diocese of Bacabal from the Territorial Prelature of São José do Grajaú and Metropolitan Archdiocese of São Luís do Maranhão

== Bishops ==
- Bishops of Bacabal (Latin Rite)
  - Pascàsio Rettler, O.F.M. (1968.07.24 – 1989.12.01)
  - Henrique Johannpötter, O.F.M. (1989.12.02 – 1997.04.10)
  - José Belisário da Silva, O.F.M. (1999.12.01 – 2005.09.21), appointed Archbishop of São Luís do Maranhão, Brazil
  - Armando Martín Gutiérrez, F.A.M. (2006.11.02 – present)

=== Coadjutor bishop ===
- Henrique Johannpötter, O.F.M. (1988–1989)

=== Other priest of this diocese who became bishop ===
- Jacinto Furtado de Brito Sobrinho, appointed Bishop of Crateús, Ceara in 1998
