= Adcox Cloud Buster =

1931 two-seat biplane

Adcox A-100

General information
- Other names: Adcox Cloud Buster, Cloud Buster Jr.
- Type: Sporting monoplane
- National origin: United States of America
- Manufacturer: Adcox Aviation Trade School

History
- Manufactured: 1931
- Outcome: Dismantling

The Adcox A-100, also known as the Adcox Cloud Buster, was a two-seat enclosed sporting biplane built by the students of the US Adcox Aviation Trade School, Portland, Oregon in 1931. Identified in some publications as Adcox Cloud Buster or Bidwell Cloud Buster Junior, it was originally powered by a Salmson AD-9 engine of 40 hp (30 kW), however in 1936 it was repowered with a more powerful, but heavier, 65 hp LeBlond 60-5D and later dismantled in 1938 after several other owners.

It was sold successively to Groat Aeronautical, Yale Air Service and on 20 August 1931 to William B Bidwell as the Cloud Buster Junior. The Bidwell-Yale Aviation Co was based at Gardiner Airport, Gardiner, Montana.
