= Santomera =

- Municipality
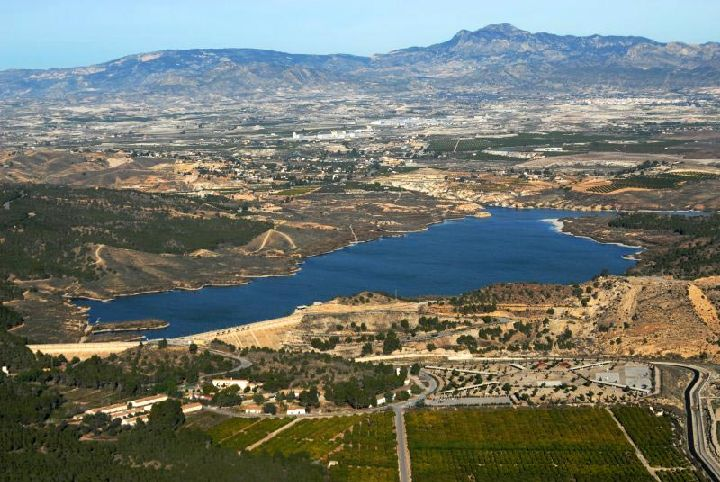

- Flag Coat of arms

- Location in Murcia

- Location in Murcia Location in Spain
- Country: Spain
- Autonomous Community: Region of Murcia
- Province: Region of Murcia
- Comarca: Huerta de Murcia
- Own municipality: 1978

Government
  - Mayor: José María Sánchez Artés (PP)

Area
  - Total: 44 km^{2} (17 sq mi)
- Elevation (AMSL): 35 m (115 ft)

Population (2025-01-01)
  - Total: 16,443
  - Density: 370/km^{2} (970/sq mi)
- Time zone: UTC+1 (CET)
  - Summer (DST): UTC+2 (CEST (GMT +2))
- Postal code: 30140
- Area code: +34 (Spain) + 968 (Murcia)
- Website: Official website

Location of Santomera in Murcia.

Santomera is a Spanish municipality in the autonomous community of Murcia. It has a population of 16,105 (2018) and an area of 44.2 km^{2}. It shares borders with Fortuna in the north, with Murcia in its west and south and with the province of Alicante in the east.

== History ==
Santomera has been inhabited by human beings since the Stone Age and former stone sculpt workplaces are the evidence of that fact. There was also human presence during the Chalcolithic and the Bronze Age along with people of the Argaric culture. Another people that stayed in the current municipality are the Iberians and constructed a town there.

There is a remaining structure of the period of Muslim occupancy in the Iberian Peninsula and it consists in a watermill.

The first documentary reference in which the toponym Santomera appears dates back to the Reconquista era. The king of The Taifa of Murcia signed a treaty with Castile in which the territory would become part of Castilian rule in 1243. However, the territory was Muslim until a Mudejar revolt in 1264–1266. The king James I of Aragon defeated the revolt. The former Taifa of Murcia was quite empty and the Castilian king decided to repopulate it. People from Catalonia, Aragon and beyond the Pyrenees moved to the Kingdom of Murcia and some new inhabitants of the kingdom were bestowed 559,000 km^{2} of Santomera.

In the 16th century there was an increase in the population and the expansion of the town owing to two facts. The first one is the fact that part of the territory was desiccated. That brought on the use of those lands and constructing on them. Some noble and religious landowners obtained the new available lands. Another important fact is that mining activities were performed again.

The mining resources were exhausted in the 18th century. However, there were other economy resources such as the ones related to agriculture.

The economy rise stopped after the Peninsular War. Santomera obtained an own town council along with the Spanish Constitution of 1812. The independence from Murcia municipality ceased when the absolutist king Ferdinand VII reached the throne. During the Trienio Liberal (1820-1823), Santomera was liberated from Murcia again, but became part of Murcia again after this period. There was another own municipality period from 1836 to 1848.

In 1879, a flood occurred in the current municipality and it caused high damages to crop lands, herds, dwellings and even some people deceased. There were other two floods in 1906 and 1947. Those also caused demises of dozens of people and dwellings were destroyed. A reservoir was constructed from 1960 to 1965.

A development took place in Santomera in 1970 decade in its economic branches, agriculture, industry and trade. Potable water also began to be available in that decade.

Those conditions brought back the municipality independence wish among the locals. They gathered in a popular assembly in 1967. A document was handed in to Murcia town council in 1971, but the issue began to be addressed a year later. The town council rejected the independence of Santomera. Locals of Santomera lodged an application to a ministry of the national government. The organisation considered Murcia town council action as illegal and invalid. The process for Santomera own town council started, it progressed slowly and would last some years. In 1978 the administrative process ended and Santomera obtained the independence permission.

The current municipality began its existence on 29 September 1978.

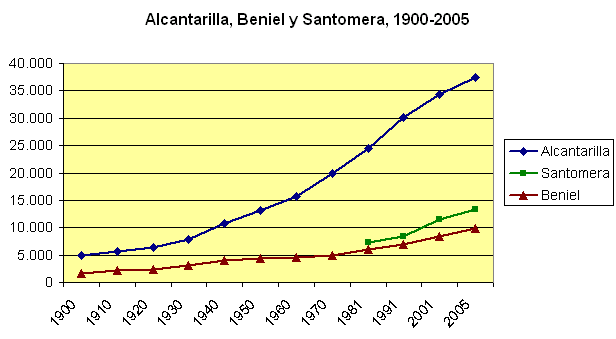
Demographic evolution of Santomera (in green) in the context of the municipalities of the comarca of Huerta de Murcia (excluding the capital).

== Geography ==
=== Physical geography ===
The municipality is placed in the limit of a precoastal depression located in Region of Murcia. Its average altitude is 38 metres. There are three raised landforms: Cabezo Bermejo, which height is 312 metres; Monte de las Brujas with a height of 147 metres and Cabezo del Trigo, which is 136 metres high. Another remarkable spot is a reservoir that is placed in the northern of the territory.

=== Human geography ===
There are four localities in Santomera. The main one is Santomera, that is located in the south of the territory and is inhabited by 13,379 people. The second most populated locality is El Siscar, where 1243 people live. It is placed in the southeast. There is also a village which name is Matanzas that is located in the north of the municipality and is home to 870 people. The least populated place is a village named Orilla del Azarbe that is in the south of Santomera. It population consists of only 314 people.

== Demographics ==
17.09% of the inhabitants are foreigners - 10.92% are Africans, 528 people are Americans, 416 are Europeans, and 56 Asian people reside in the municipality.

== Facilities ==
=== Healthcare ===
The municipality is part of the Healtharea VII (Murcia/Este) and one of its twelve subareas covers the municipality. Santomera hosts a consultorio (primary care centre with fewer functions than the centros de salud) and a centro de salud.

=== Education ===
There is an early childhood and primary education centre (CEIP) and a secondary education centre (IES) in the main town. A primary school centre is located in Matanzas and another one in El Siscar. The town also hosts a centre of the national institution for language teaching named Escuela Oficial de Idiomas.

== Economy ==
Agriculture is highly performed in the municipality. 38.9% of the surface is utilised for landcrop purposes and the most widely grown product is the lemon. 65.24% of the people had jobs in the agriculture sector in 2019 and 49.17% of the workers were hired as labourers in the second half of 2016. 28.3% of the agreements were written for jobs of the service sector in 2019, and 6.02% of the agreements were signed by waiters, whose job is the third most performed in Santomera. Only 4.93% of the hired workers had posts in the industry sector.

== Main sights ==
- Del Rosario Parish Church: It was built in the 19th century. Before the current church, there was a little shrine in the same location. The shrine experienced a little phases in which it was remodelled and expanded. The construction of the current version of the church started in 1840.It has an eclectic architectural style. The plan of the building is latin cross-shaped. In the longer part of the cross in composed of a nave and two aisled in its inner part.

== Festivities ==
- Holy Week: Fundamentally, this festivity is held in the same way than other places in Spain. There are processions (festive religious solemn parades) in which participants walk grouped in confraternities (groups of people in religious affairs) and carry religious statues or sculptures on decorated platforms.
- Moros y Cristianos: These festive days take place in the second half of June.
- Independent municipality commemorative day: Its name in Spanish is Día del Ayuntamiento (literally translated as Town Council Day). This festive day takes place on 29 September and is about commemorating the independence of Santomera from Murcia municipality in 1978.
- Del Rosario Virgin patron saint festivity: This festivity is dedicated to the Virgin Mary in her Rosary facet. It begins in the second half of September and ends in the late first third of October. During these days several activities such as sport tournaments (volleyball, basketball, pétanque, hockey and table tennis), Rosary prays meetings, music and theatre performances, and so force.

== Notable people ==
- María Josefa Alhama Valera (1893–1983): Founder of Handmaids of Merciful love in 1930, and the Sons of Merciful Love in 1951.

== See also ==
- List of municipalities in the Region of Murcia
