= Henrique Johannpötter =

Roman Catholic bishop

Henrique Johannpötter OFM
- Bishop of Bacabal
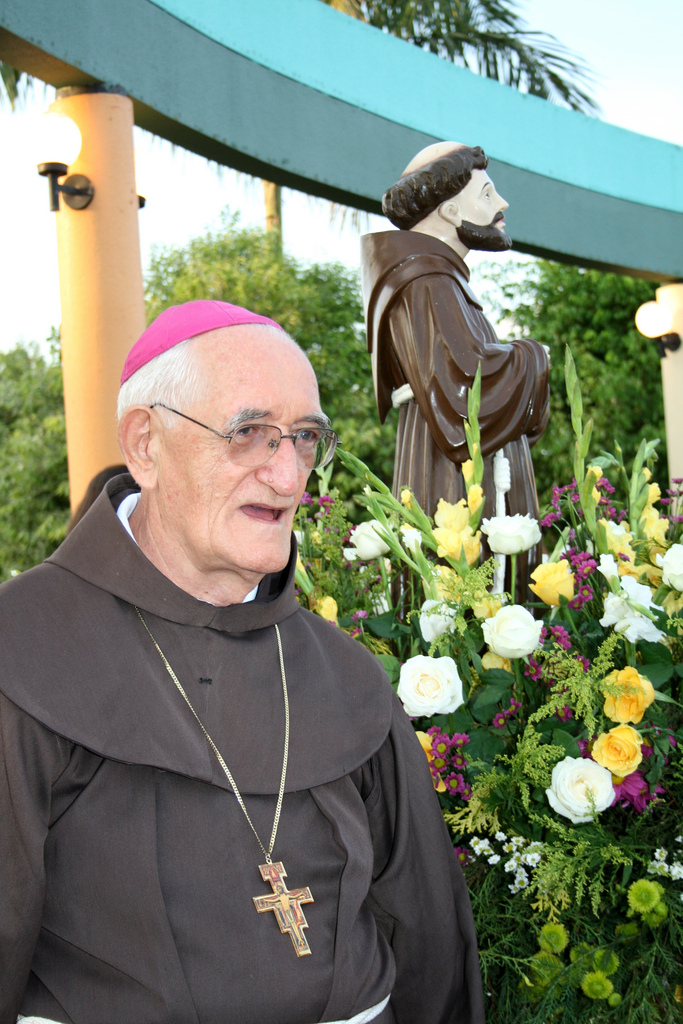
- Church: Catholic Church
- Diocese: Diocese of Bacabal
- In office: 2 December 1989 – 10 April 1997
- Predecessor: Paschasius Hermann Rettler
- Successor: José Belisário da Silva
- Previous post: Coadjutor Bishop of Bacabal (1988-1989)

Orders
- Ordination: 26 July 1961
- Consecration: 20 January 1989 by Paschasius Hermann Rettler

Personal details
- Born: 23 June 1933 Milte, Warendorf, Province of Westphalia, Free State of Prussia, German Reich
- Died: 19 July 2011 (aged 78) São Luís, Maranhão, Brazil

Henrique Johannpötter OFM (German: Heinrich Johannpötter, pronounced [ˈjoːhanˌpœtɐ]; Warendorf, 23 June 1933 – São Luís, 19 July 2011) was the Roman Catholic bishop of the Diocese of Bacabal, Brazil.

Born in Warendorf, Germany, Johannpötter was ordained to the priesthood in 1961. In 1988 he was named coadjutor bishop of the diocese and eventually became bishop resigning in 1997.
