= Adcox Student Prince =

1929 two-seat biplane

Student Prince
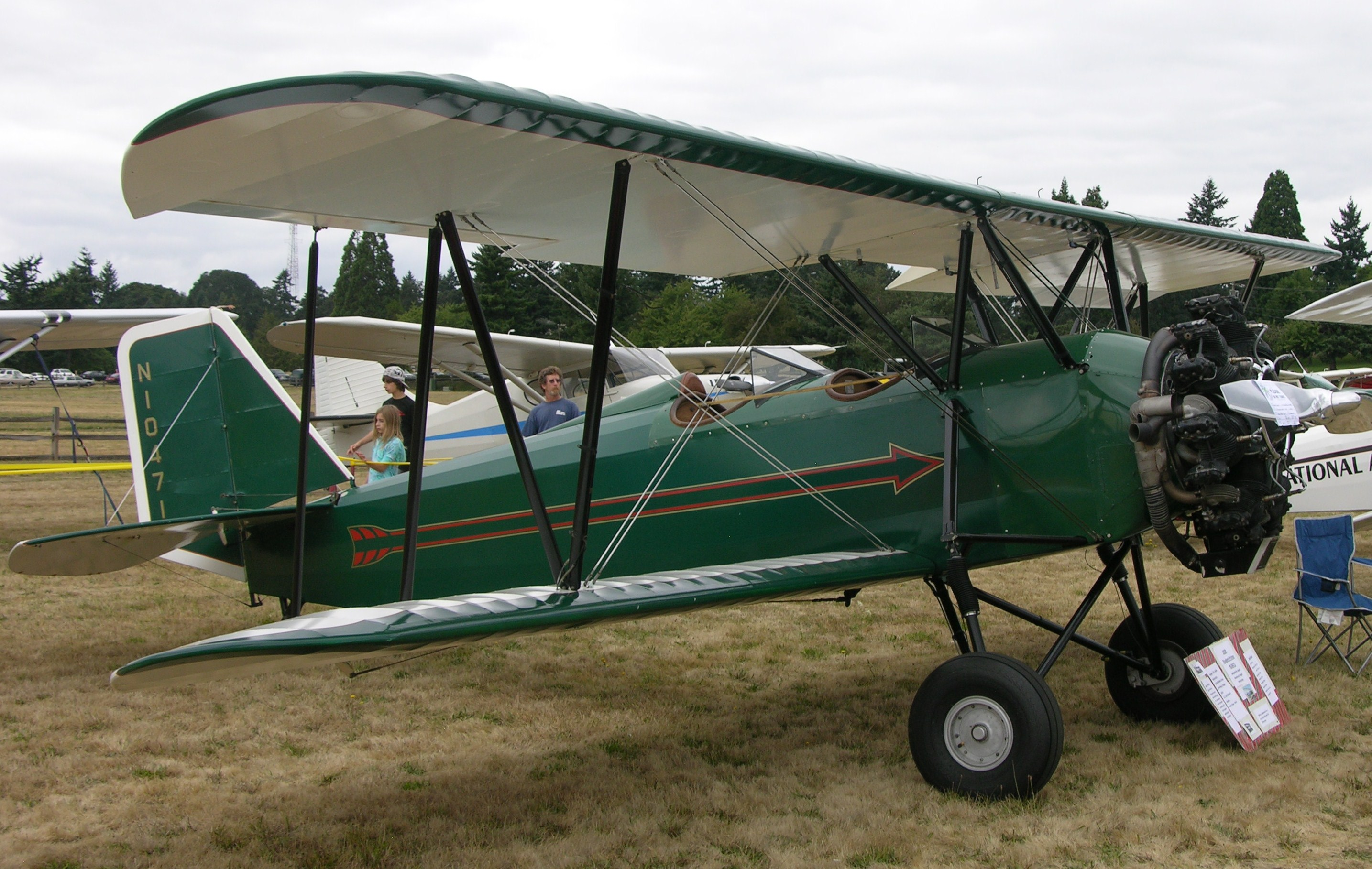

General information
- Type: Sport lightplane
- National origin: United States of America
- Manufacturer: Adcox
- Designer: Basil B Smith
- Number built: 6

History
- First flight: 17 September 1929

The Adcox Student Prince was a two-seat open-cockpit biplane designed by Basil Smith and built by the students of the US Adcox Aviation Trade School in 1929. It was based on the one-off Adcox Special, and the first example flew on 17 September.

A single example of a Student Prince X was produced in 1931 powered by a 90 hp ACE engine.

As of 2004, a single example remains registered in the United States, which was successively re-engined with 100 hp Kinner K-5, then 110 hp Warner Scarab Junior, Comet 150hp, 150 hp Wright-Hisso A and 220 hp Continental E-225 in 1963.

== Specifications (Student Prince) ==
Data from

General characteristics

- Crew: 1
- Capacity: 1
- Length: 23 ft 6 in (7.16 m)
- Wingspan: 30 ft 3 in (9.22 m)
- Powerplant: 1 × Cirrus Mk III 4-cyl. air-cooled in-line piston engine, 85 hp (63 kW)

Performance

- Maximum speed: 110 mph (180 km/h, 96 kn)
- Range: 500 mi (800 km, 430 nmi)

== See also ==
Related development

- Adcox Special
