= Luis Ruiz Suárez =

Spanish Jesuit priest and missionary (1913–2011)

Coordinates: 22°11′32.77″N 113°32′16.54″E

Rev. Luis Ruiz Suárez S.J.
- Born: September 21, 1913; Gijón, Asturias, Spain
- Died: July 26, 2011 (aged 97); Macau, China
- Resting place: San Miguel cemetery, Macau
- Other names: "Luk Ngai" in Cantonese "Father of the Poor" "Angel of Macau"
- Education: Shanghai (for priesthood)
- Occupation: Missionary to China
- Years active: 1941–2011
- Era: Portuguese/Chinese
- Organization: Society of Jesus
- Known for: Service to poor, especially refugees, lepers, HIV/AIDS patients
- Works: Casa Ricci Social Services, Caritas Macau
- Website: Casa Ricci Social Services

Luis Ruiz Suárez S.J. (September 21, 1913 – July 26, 2011) was a Spanish-born Jesuit priest and missionary to China. Father Ruiz founded Casa Ricci Social Services, and later the Caritas Macau charity. His work in the 1950s focused mainly on refugees from mainland China. As Casa Ricci's works developed, it spawned Caritas Macau and Ruiz turned the focus of Casa Ricci to work with lepers and their families, and still later to those suffering from HIV/AIDS. He came to be known by several nicknames – "Luk Ngai" (in Cantonese), "Father of the Poor", and "Angel of Macau."

== Early life ==
Luis Ruiz Suarez was born in Gijón, Asturias, Spain, on September 21, 1913. He joined the Society of Jesus, also known as the Jesuits, in 1930. As a young Jesuit he taught at Belen College in Cuba, where he had Fidel Castro as one of his students. Then in 1941 the Jesuits sent him to China as a missionary. He studied Mandarin Chinese in Beijing and philosophy in Shanghai. He was forced to cease his work due to the escalation of World War II and the Japanese occupation of China. After 1945 his superiors stationed him in Xian County in Hebei province. He was arrested, briefly imprisoned, and expelled from the newly formed People's Republic of China in 1949 following the Chinese Communist Revolution. While in prison, Ruiz contracted typhoid before his expulsion from China. He left China for Hong Kong in 1951.

== Macau, Casa Ricci Social Services, Caritas Macau ==
In 1951, Ruiz's Jesuit provincial sent him to Macau, a Portuguese colony along the southern Chinese coast, to recover from his typhoid; he would be based there for the rest of his life. The roots of Jesuit social work in Macau go back to 1569 when Melchior Carneiro, the first bishop of Macau, founded there the first Western-style hospitals in Asia. Ruiz's first major work was with refugees fleeing from the People's Republic of China. He used the official Jesuit residence in Macau, which was called Casa Ricci, as a temporary shelter for the mainland Chinese refugees. This led to the establishment of Father Ruiz's first charity in Macau, the Ricci Center for Social Services, which offered a variety of social services. The center furnished refugees with housing, educational opportunities, documentation, child care, and employment. For their children the centre set up the Colegio Mateus Ricci School and the Escola de Santa Teresa do Menino Jesus School.

When the refugees were able to leave the Portuguese territory, Father Ruiz began work with other groups in Macau. He founded the first housing in Macau specifically established to house the elderly, "Betania Home" for men and "Santa Maria Home" for women. He also extended services to the north of the peninsula and Taipa Island to alleviate family poverty and child labor.

Casa Ricci later spawned the Caritas Macau charitable organization during the 1970s. For Caritas, among other services, Ruiz opened five centers throughout Macau which provided services for the mentally disabled.

Ruiz had learned early on from his experiences in China to avoid political involvement, but engage in dialogue, and he advocated this approach among his fellow workers.

== Throughout China; Ricci Social Service Foundation ==
Father Ruiz was invited by a Chinese priest and former prisoner, Father Lino Wong, to Dajin Island of Taishan, Guangdong province, where 200 lepers had been exiled in 1986. The visit began Ruiz's ministry for lepers in the country, along with an order of Catholic religious sisters, the Sisters of Charity of St. Anne.

When Christian social workers were again admitted to China, Casa Ricci was one of the first to address the needs of disabled persons and lepers. Ruiz began by obtaining medical care, food, water, and help with housing, while religious sisters joined his efforts. This work extended to Shaanxi, Sichuan, and Yunnan provinces of China. The anniversary of these new efforts, under the now established name of Casa Ricci Social Services, was celebrated in 2017. Ruiz emphasized reintegrating into society the children of lepers, securing their education along with other children. He established orphanages where they would not be associated with the stigma of leprosy. It is estimated that Father Ruiz worked with more than 8,000 leprosy patients living in 140 leper colonies located throughout China. His work with lepers proved so time-consuming that he voluntarily handed over control of Caritas Macau to the Roman Catholic Diocese of Macau in 1994, and continued to develop programs for Casa Ricci Social Services.

Ruiz went on to establish charitable institutions for the elderly, the disabled, and the mentally handicapped, and to educate social workers throughout much of China. At the same time, Caritas Macau, which was an offshoot of his original work grew by 2014 to become "one of the city’s largest non-government organisations; it operates 34 centres with 800 staff and 500-600 volunteers. Its charity work extends beyond the city boundaries, to Anhui province, Bangladesh, and East Timor.

In 1995, the government of Hongjiang, Hunan province, invited Father Ruiz to establish a center for HIV and AIDS patients in the Chinese province. He would found other centers for AIDS patients in mainland China, including one in Hunan province in 2006 for HIV/AIDS terminal patients and Joy Children's Home in Lufeng, Guangdong in 2007.

After 2005, his efforts extended to helping lepers in Vietnam and Burma. He was widely known for his ability to appeal to people for help, with his list of benefactors estimated at about 2,500, as he made appeals in places like Hawaii and the US, He used silk screen prints crafted by refugees to help raise funds. While Caritas Macau worked mainly in the city, Ruiz founded the Ricci Social Service Foundation to foster the widespread work of Casa Ricci Social Services, "to help the people living in the Chinese mainland and the Macao SAR on the margins of poverty and society, ... and contribute to the development of the country as a whole." For the Ricci Social Service Foundation, the revised text of the "articles of association was filed in the Department's 2010/ASS/M2 file group on May 6, 2010".

On a personal level, Father Ruiz was said to be an ardent fan of Formula One, Real Madrid and Rafael Nadal.

Father Luis Ruiz Suarez died in Macau on July 26, 2011, at the age of 97. Chief executive of Macau, Fernando Chui, in his condolences described Ruiz as "a great philanthropist and citizen of Macau ...(whose) work was worthy of recognition and respect by the entire society. ... (He) will remain an example of the great values of solidarity and unconditional dedication to others." He was buried at San Miguel cemetery on August 3, 2011.

In 2015, the Ricci Social Service Foundation was running 50 programs distributed in 13 provinces of China with 64 leprosy centers for a total of 4,000 patients and five HIV homes with a total of 300 HIV+ mothers/adult. It was also caring for 1500 students from poor families.
