= Henry Metelmann =

German communist

Henry Friedrich Carl Metelmann
- Born: December 25, 1922; Altona, Hamburg, Germany
- Died: July 24, 2011 (aged 88)
- Allegiance: Nazi Germany
- Service years: 1941-1945
- Rank: Obergefreiter

Henry Friedrich Carl Metelmann (25 December 1922 – 24 July 2011) was a German soldier, peace activist and writer who was best known for a book about his experiences growing up in Nazi Germany and in World War II entitled Through Hell for Hitler.

== Biography ==
=== Upbringing and military service ===
Metelmann was an only child born in Altona (now part of Hamburg) where his father was a railway worker and socialist and his mother a committed Christian. Joining the Hitler Youth when his church scout group was absorbed into the organisation shortly after the Nazi party's rise to power in Germany in 1933, like many German young people of his generation Metelmann became an enthusiastic supporter of nazism at an early age. In 1941 at the age of 18 he joined the Wehrmacht and was posted to the Crimea with the 11th Army. As a tank driver in the 22nd Panzer Division which was virtually destroyed in 1942, he was briefly captured by Red Army soldiers and was involved in the Battle of Stalingrad. He attained the rank of Obergefreiter and towards the end of the war he was posted to the Rhineland and captured by the Americans.

=== Life after the second world war ===
After spending time in various prisoner of war camps in the United States, he was sent to the United Kingdom in 1946, where he settled permanently upon his release in 1948 (after having briefly returned to Germany), living in Hampshire and then Godalming, Surrey, working as a railway signalman and then a groundsman at Charterhouse School. He was a member of the Communist Party and the Campaign for Nuclear Disarmament, becoming a committed peace activist. After the publication of Through Hell for Hitler he was the subject of a 60 minute BBC Two Timewatch documentary broadcast on 5 December 2003 where he openly admits to war crimes he took part in. He was also interviewed for other television programmes and lectured to young people in schools and colleges.
