= Adcox Aviation Trade School =

Aviation trade school in Portland, Oregon, U.S.

The Adcox Aviation Trade School was established in Portland, Oregon in the 1910s. Aircraft created there as student projects starting in the late 1920s include the Adcox Special, Adcox Student Prince, and Adcox Cloud Buster.

The Adcox school began as a trade school for automobile and gas-engine mechanics, but in 1920 it added a course in aviation to its curriculum, focused on the construction and repair of airplane motors.

At different points in its history, the organization was known as the Adcox Auto and Aviation School, the Adcox School of Aviation, Aircraft Builders Corp and the First National Flying System.

In late 1929, after a new two-story building was opened, the school had the largest enrollment of any aviation school in the Pacific Northwest, with 100 full-time students.

== List of Aircraft ==
- Adcox 1-A(1929) Single-engine two-seat biplane light aircraft, only one was made.
- Adcox Special (1929) Single-engine two-seat biplane light aircraft
- Adcox Student Prince (1929) Single-engine two-seat biplane light aircraft
- Adcox Special (1931) Single-engine two-seat biplane light aircraft
- Adcox Cloud Buster (1931) Single-engine two-seat sporting biplane
