= Dionysios Bairaktaris =

Greek Orthodox metropolitan bishop

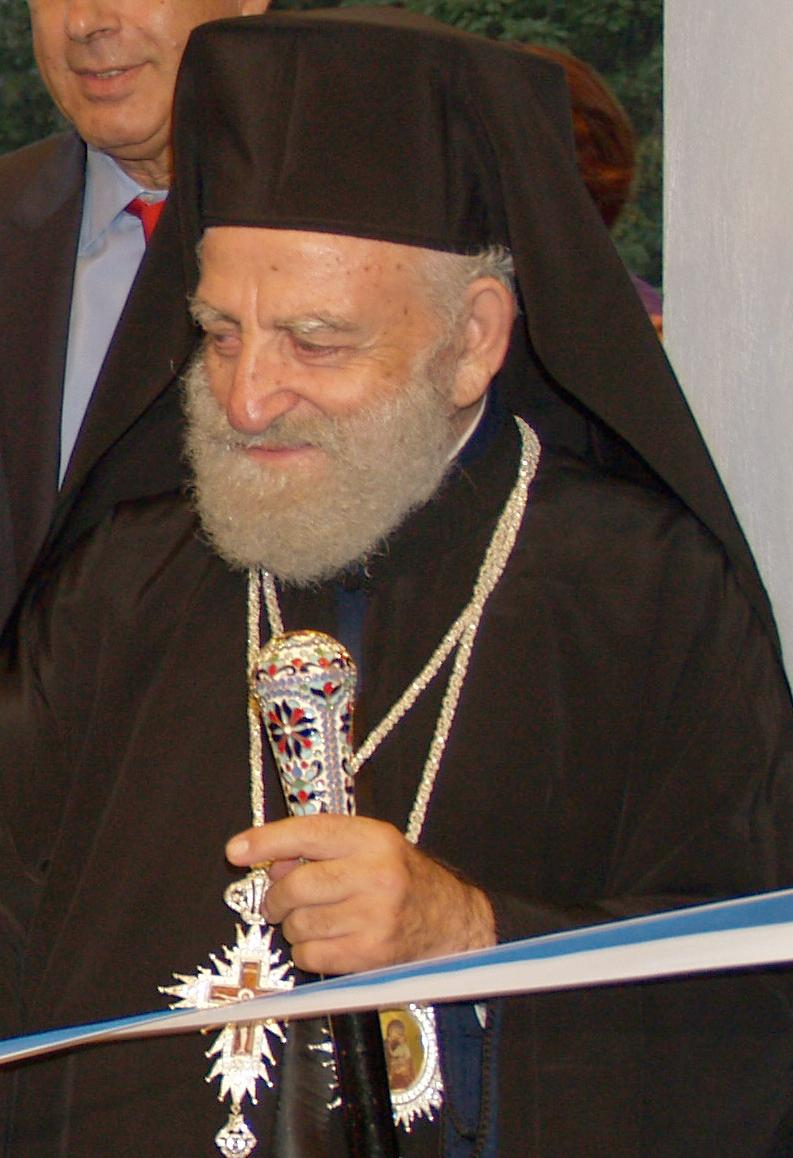

Dionysios Bairaktaris (1927 – July 17, 2011) was the Greek Orthodox metropolitan bishop of Chios, Psara, and Oinousses, Greece.
