= Jay Adcox =

American football player and coach (1950–2011)

Biographical details
- Born: December 24, 1950; Snoqualmie, Washington, U.S.
- Died: July 26, 2011 (aged 60); Magnolia, Arkansas, U.S.

Playing career
- 1969: Missouri

Coaching career (HC unless noted)
- 1975–1980: Missouri Western (GA/AHC/DC)
- 1981–1982: Morehead State (DC)
- 1983–1985: Peru State
- 1986–1993: Southern Arkansas (DC)

Administrative career (AD unless noted)
- 1997–2001: Southern Arkansas

Head coaching record
- Overall: 13–16

Jay Dee Adcox (December 24, 1950 – July 26, 2011) was an American football player and coach. A former player at the University of Missouri in the late 1960s, he served as the head football coach at Peru State College in Peru, Nebraska from 1983 to 1985, compiling a record of 13–16.
