= Jane Baker (mayor) =

American politician

- Born: June 2, 1923; Ohio
- Died: July 1, 2011 (aged 88)
- Education: Purdue University
- Spouse(s): Bill Baker (m.1946–2011, her death)
- Children: 2

Mayor of San Mateo, California

Jane Elaine Baker (June 2, 1923 – July 1, 2011) was an American politician, community organizer and former cooking show host. Baker served on the city council of San Mateo, California for twenty years. She was appointed the Mayor of San Mateo on six occasions, becoming San Mateo's first female mayor.

== Biography ==
=== Early life ===
Baker was born in Ohio. She received her bachelor's degree in nutrition and home economics from Purdue University. She met her future husband, Bill Baker, in 1941 while both were participating in a Purdue University student debate called "Are Men Good Or Bad?" Bill, who had attended the debate for a speech class, asked her out on a date the next day. The couple married on the same day that Jane graduated from Purdue in 1946 and had two children.

Baker moved with her husband to the San Francisco Bay area due to Bill Baker's governmental job transfer, where he worked as an FBI agent. She worked as the host and television producer of a home cooking show, which was filmed in San Francisco, before relocating to the nearby city of San Mateo. In the late 1950s, Baker and her family lived on Sunset Terrace in the western hills of San Mateo before relocating to the nearby Laurelwood neighborhood. Baker was credited as one of the bakers of cookies sent to a company of the 101st Airborne Division "Screaming Eagles". San Mateo adopted Alpha Company, 1st Battalion, 327 Infantry Regiment on March 4, 1968.

=== Political career ===
Baker first became involved in politics and community activism during the early 1970s. Developers had proposed development of open land on the city's Sugarloaf Mountain. Baker organized a group made up of predominantly women activists into the Save Sugarloaf Committee, which successfully fought off the developer and preserved Sugarloaf as one of the city's permanent open spaces.

Her experience as an activist and organizer led her to seek elected office to the city council. She was elected to the San Mateo city council in 1973 on an environmental platform, defeating two incumbent members and seven other candidates for her seat. In doing so, she became the second woman ever elected to San Mateo's city council. She remained on the city council for twenty years, until her retirement from office in 1993. Baker campaigned to be called "councilwoman" while in office, noting that her male colleagues used the term "councilman". The San Mateo County Times called her a "bridge-builder and peacemaker" during her tenure.

Baker was appointed and reappointed Mayor of San Mateo on six occasions, becoming the first woman to hold the mayoral office in San Mateo. A three-term limit for future mayors was instituted by city council while she was still in office after having served five of her terms.

Baker retired from the city council and the mayor's office in 1993 after twenty years in office. Baker served on the board of the Metropolitan Transportation Commission (MTC) for sixteen years, including two years as the board's chairwoman from 1993 to 1995. While at MTC, Baker championed efforts to preserve and access open space, including the San Francisco Bay Trail. Baker also served as the president of the American Association of University Women (AAUW) and the president of the League of California Cities.

San Mateo County honored her work in 1999 by naming her to the San Mateo County Women's Hall of Fame. In 2004, Rep. Tom Lantos read a tribute to her into the record of the 108th Congress. She and her husband also became licensed pilots.

Jane Baker died on July 1, 2011, at the age of 88. Her health had been in decline during her later years.

== Family ==
She was survived by her husband of 66 years, Bill Baker; two children, Cindy Kuiper and Bruce Baker; four grandchildren and four great-grandchildren.

== Legacy ==
In May 2013, her trust donated US$50,000 to preserve and maintain Sugarloaf Mountain, prompting the city council of San Mateo to consider renaming the adjacent Laurelwood Park in her honor. The city's Parks and Recreation Director told the city council there was a policy prohibiting parks from being named after people, but would consider adding an interpretive center to the base of the trail at Sugarloaf and naming it after Baker. Other proposed uses included land restoration or interpretive panels at the summit, but the bequest was eventually earmarked towards the creation of additional hiking trails, removing fire breaks and restoring the land.
