= List of saints of India =

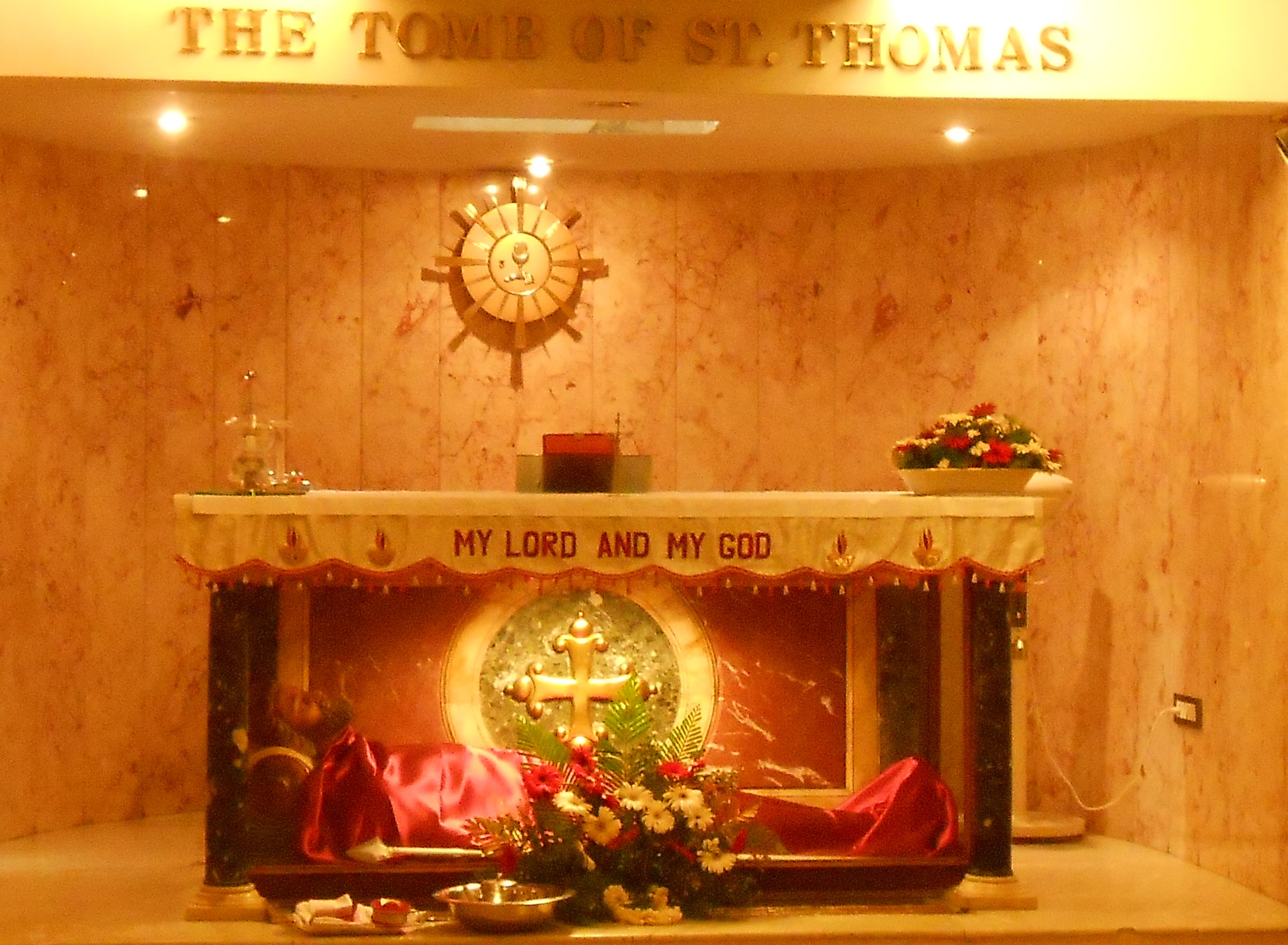
The tomb of St. Thomas the Apostle in Chennai

The Catholic Church recognizes certain deceased Catholics as saints, beati, venerabili, and servants of God. Listed are those born, died, or lived in India.

== Apostles ==
Image	Name	Date of birth	Place of birth	Date of death	Place of death	Description	Feast
	St. Thomas the Apostle (Mar Thoma)	1st century AD	Galilee	3 July 72 AD	Mylapore, Chennai (presently Santhome)	The Apostle of India, who came to Tamilakam, present day Kerala and Tamil Nadu, and was martyred on St.Thomas Mount.	3 July (solemnity in India)
	St. Bartholomew the Apostle	1st century AD	Cana, Galilee	1st century AD	Armenia	According to tradition, he did missionary activity in the region near Bombay on the Konkan coast.	24 August

== Saints ==
=== Early times ===
Image	Name	Date of birth	Place of birth	Date of death	Place of death	Description	Feast
	Pantaenus	2nd century AD	Sicily	c. 200	Alexandria, Egypt	A Greek theologian and a significant figure in the Catechetical School of Alexandria who lived as a missionary in India.	7 July
	Severus of Vienne		India	c. 455	Italy	A missionary priest in France, Indian by birth.	8 August
	Petroc	c. 468	Wales	c. 564	Cornwall, England	A British abbot who lived in India where he tamed wolves and returned to Britain with a wolf companion he had met in India.	4 June

=== Modern times ===
Image	Name	Date of birth	Place of birth	Date of death	Place of death	Description	Feast	Declared servant of God	Declared venerable	Beatified	Canonised	Diocese	Rite
	St. Francis Xavier (Francisco de Jasso Azpilicueta) S.J.	7 April 1506	Navarra, Spain	3 December 1552	China	Cofounder of the Society of Jesus (Jesuits)	3 December (solemnity in India)			25 October 1619	12 March 1622	Goa and Daman	Latin
	St. Gonsalo Garcia (Gonçalo Garcia) O.F.M.	15 May 1557	Bassein, Bombay	5 February 1597	Nagasaki, Japan	Professed Religious of the Franciscan Friars Minor; Martyr	6 February			14 September 1627	8 June 1862	Vasai	Latin
	St. John de Brito (João de Brito or Swami Arulanandar) S.J.	1 March 1647	Lisbon, Portugal	11 February 1693	Oriyur, Madurai	Priest; Martyr	4 February			21 August 1853	22 June 1947	Sivagangai	Latin
	St. Joseph Vaz (Juze Vaz) C.O.	21 April 1651	Benaulim, Goa	17 January 1711	Kandy, Sri Lanka	Priest of the Oratorians	16 January		13 May 1989	21 January 1995	14 January 2015	Goa and Daman	Latin
	St. Devasahayam Pillai (Lazarus)	23 April 1712	Palliyadi, Tamil Nadu	14 January 1752	Aralvaimozhi, Tamil Naudu	Married Layperson; Martyr	14 January	22 December 2003	28 June 2012	2 December 2012	15 May 2022	Kottar	Latin
	St. Kuriakose Elias Chavara C.M.I.	8 February 1805	Kainakari, Alappuzha	3 January 1871	Koonammavu, Ernakulam	Cofounder and Professed Priest of the Carmelites of Mary Immaculate; Founder of the Congregation of the Mother of Carmel	3 January	8 December 1958	7 April 1984	8 February 1986	23 November 2014	Changanassery	Syro-Malabar
	St. Mariam Baouardy (Maryam Bawardi or Marie of Jesus Crucified) O.C.D.	5 January 1846	Palestine (Ottoman Syria)	26 August 1878	Bethlehem	Professed Religious of the Discalced Carmelite Nuns, helped found the missionary Carmel of Mangalore, India	26 August	18 May 1927	27 November 1981	13 November 1983	17 May 2015	Mangalore	Latin
	St. Mariam Thresia Chiramel Mankidiyan	26 April 1876	Thrissur, Kerala	8 June 1926	Thrissur, Kerala	Cofounder of the Congregation of the Holy Family	8 June	5 October 1973	28 June 1999	9 April 2000	13 October 2019	Irinjalakuda	Syro-Malabar
	St. Maximilian Kolbe (Rajmund Kolbe or Maksymilian Maria Kolbe) O.F.M.Conv.	8 January 1894	Poland	14 August 1941	Auschwitz death camp, Poland	Professed Priest of the Franciscan Conventuals, Travelled in 1932 to Malabar, India, where he founded a monastery	14 August	12 May 1955	30 January 1969	17 October 1971	10 October 1982	Verapoly	Latin
	St. Alphonsa of the Immaculate Conception (Anna Muttathupadathu)	19 August 1910	Kottayam	28 July 1946	Kottayam	Professed Religious of the Franciscan Clarist Congregation	28 July	2 December 1953	9 November 1984	8 February 1986	12 October 2008	Palai	Syro-Malabar
	St. Euphrasia Eluvathingal (Rosa Eluvathingal or Euphrasia of the Sacred Heart of Jesus)	17 October 1877	Kattoor, Irinjalakuda	29 August 1952	Ollur, Thrissur	Professed Religious of the Congregation of the Mother of Carmel	29 August	29 August 1987	5 July 2002	3 December 2006	23 November 2014	Thrissur	Syro-Malabar
	St. Teresa of Calcutta (Anjëzë Gonxhe Bojaxhiu)	26 August 1910	Skopje, Macedonia	5 September 1997	Calcutta	Founder of the Missionaries of Charity	5 September	12 June 1999	20 December 2002	19 October 2003	4 September 2016	Calcutta	Latin

== Beatified ==
Image	Name	Date of birth	Place of birth	Date of death	Place of death	Description	Feast	Declared servant of God	Declared venerable	Beatified	Diocese	Rite
	Bl. Odoric of Pordenone	1286	Pordenone	14 January 1331	Udine	Franciscan friar	14 January			2 July 1755	Bombay, Cuttack-Bhubaneswar	Latin
	Martyrs of Cuncolim: Bl. Rodolfo Acquaviva; Bl. Alphonsus Pacheco; Bl. Peter Berno; Bl. Anthony Francis; Bl. Francis Aranha			2 July 1583	Goa	Professed Priests and Religious of the Jesuits; Laypersons	27 July			16 April 1893	Goa and Daman	Latin
	Some of the 205 Martyrs of Japan: Bl. Miguel de Carvalho, ordained a priest in Goa; Bl. Francisco Pacheco, seminarian in Goa; Bl. John Baptist Zola, missionary in Goa; Bl. Balthasar de Torres, seminarian in Goa; Bl. Diogo Carvalho (Didacus Carvalho), seminarian in Goa; Bl. Pietro Paolo Navarra, ordained a priest in Goa; Bl. Joao Batisto Machado, seminarian in Goa			1598–1632	Japan		10 September			7 May 1867	Goa and Daman	Latin
	Bls. Denis of the Nativity (Pierre Berthelot) and Redemptus of the Cross (Tomás Rodrigues da Cunha)			29 November 1638	Achen-Jakarta, Indonesia	Professed Priest and Religious of the Discalced Carmelites; Martyrs	29 November			10 June 1900	Goa and Daman	Latin
	Bl. Mary of the Passion (Helene-Marie-Philippine de Chappotin de Neuville)	21 May 1839	Nantes, France	15 November 1904	Sanremo, Italy	Founder of the Franciscan Missionaries of Mary	15 November	30 June 1923	28 June 1999	20 October 2002	Ooty	Latin
	Mother Eliswa Vakayil	15 October 1831	Vypin, Ernakulam	18 July 1913	Varapuzha	Widow; Founder of the Congregation of Teresian Carmelites	18 July	30 August 2008	6 January 2024	8 November 2025	Verapoly	Latin
	Bl. Augustinose Thevarparampil (Kunjachan)	1 April 1891	Ramapuram, Kerala	16 October 1973	Ramapuram, Kerala	Diocesan Priest	16 October	11 August 1987	22 June 2004	30 April 2006	Palai	Syro-Malabar
	Bl. Sister Rani Maria (Mariam Vattalil)	29 January 1954	Pulluvazhy, Ernakulam	25 February 1995	Dhad Devanala village, Kampel, Indore	Professed Religious of the Franciscan Clarist Congregation, Martyr	25 February	29 June 2005	23 March 2017	4 November 2017	Indore	Syro-Malabar

== Group of martyrs ==
- The Four Martyrs of Thane (d. 9 April 1321 in Thane, India), Roman Catholic
  - Bl. Thomas of Tolentino (Tommaso di Tolentino) (born ca. 1255), Professed Priest of the Franciscan Friars Minor (Italy)
  - James of Padua (Giacomo di Padua), Professed Priest of the Franciscan Friars Minor (Italy)
  - Peter of Siena (Pietro di Siena), Professed Religious of the Franciscan Friars Minor (Italy)
  - Demetrius of Tiflis (Demetrio da Tifliz), Layperson of the Diocese of Quilon (Georgia-Armenia)
    - Beatification date: 10 October 1894
    - Feast: 9 April

== Venerables ==
Image	Name	Date of birth	Place of birth	Date of death	Place of death	Description	Declared servant of God	Declared venerable	Diocese	Rite
	Ven. Matteo Ricci, SJ	6 October 1552	Macerata	11 May 1610	Beijing	Priest, scholar in Goa 1578-1582, ordained at Cochin	1984	17 December 2022	Goa and Daman	Latin
	Ven. Melchior de Marion Brésillac	2 December 1813	Castelnaudary, France	25 June 1859	Freetown, Sierra Leone	Apostolic Vicar of Coimbatore		26 May 2020	Coimbatore	Latin
	Ven. Joseph Alois Hartmann (Anastasius of Altwis), OFM. Cap.	24 February 1803	Switzerland	24 April 1866	Kurji, Patna	Apostolic Vicar of Patna		21 December 1998	Allahabad	Latin
	Ven. Veronica of the Passion (Sophia Leeves)	1 October 1823	Constantinople	16 November 1906	Pau, France	Professed Religious of the Discalced Carmelite Nuns; Founder of the Sisters of the Apostolic Carmel	16 July 1999	8 July 2014	Bangalore	Latin
	Mathew Makil	27 March 1851	Manjoor, Kottayam	26 January 1914	Kottayam	Apostolic Vicar of Changanacherry and Kottayam; Founder of the Sisters of the Visitation of the Blessed Virgin Mary	26 January 2009	26 July 2025	Kottayam	Syro-Malabar
	Ven. Mary Jane Wilson (Maria of Saint Francis)	3 October 1840	Harihara, Karnataka	18 October 1916	Madeira, Portugal	Founder of the Franciscan Sisters of Our Lady of Victory		9 October 2013	Shimoga	Latin
	Ven. António Barroso	5 November 1854	Remelhe, Barcelos, Portugal	31 August 1918	Porto, Portugal	Bishop of Saint Thomas of Mylapore		16 June 2017	Madras and Mylapore	Latin
	Ven. Thomas Kurialacherry	14 January 1873	Champakulam, Changanacherry	2 June 1925	Rome	Eparch of Changanacherry of the Syro-Malabarese; Founder of the Sisters of Adoration of the Blessed Sacrament	25 January 1985	2 April 2011	Changanacherry	Syro-Malabar
	Ven. Agnelo Gustavo Adolfo de Souza	21 January 1869	Anjuna, Goa	20 November 1927	Goa	Priest of the Missionary Society of Saint Francis Xavier of Pilar	7 February 1953	10 November 1986	Goa and Daman	Latin
	Ven. Varghese Payapilly Palakkappilly	8 August 1876	Konthuruthy	5 October 1929	Ernakulam	Priest; Founder of the Sisters of the Destitute	25 August 2009	3 March 2016	Ernakulam-Angamaly	Syro-Malabar
	Ven. Mathew Kadalikattil	25 April 1872	Edappady, Kerala	23 May 1935	Pala, Kerala	Diocesan Priest; Founder of the Sacred Heart Congregation	12 November 1989	27 June 2011	Palai	Syro-Malabar
	Ven. Fr. John Vincent, OCD	19 July 1862	Spain	27 February 1943	Spain	Priest	22 September 1978	12 January 1996	Verapoly	Latin
	Joseph Panjikaran	10 September 1888	Uzhuva, Ernakulam	4 November 1949	Kothamangalam	Priest; Founder of the Medical Sisters of Saint Joseph	18 June 2010	18 December 2025	Ernakulam-Angamaly	Syro-Malabar
	Geevarghese Mar Ivanios (Geevarghese Thomas Panickerveetil)	21 September 1882	Mavelikkara	15 July 1953	Trivandrum	First Archbishop of Syro-Malankara Catholic Church; Founder of the Congregation of the Imitation of Christ (Bethany Ashram), the Sisters of the Imitation of Christ and the Daughters of Mary	14 July 2007	14 March 2024	Trivandrum	Syro-Malankara
	Ven. Fernanda Riva	17 April 1920	Monza, Milan	22 January 1956	Bombay	Professed Religious of the Canossian Daughters of Charity	13 August 1994	28 June 2012	Alleppey	Latin
	Ven. Augustine John Ukken	19 Dec 1880	Thrissur, Kerala	13 October 1956	Chowannur, Thrissur, Kerala	Priest; Founder of the Sisters of Charity of Trichur	24 August 2008	22 December 2018	Thrissur	Syro-Malabar
	Ven. Constantine Vendrame, SDB	27 August 1893	Italy	30 January 1957	Dibrugarh	Priest	2009	22 May 2026	Shillong	Latin
	Sr. Dr. Mary Glowrey, JMJ (Mary of the Sacred Heart)	23 June 1887	Birregurra, Australia	5 May 1957	Bangalore	Foundress of Catholic Health Association of India (CHAI)	27 March 2013	11 February 2025	Guntur	Latin
	Ven. Zacarias Salterain Bizkarra (Zacarias of Saint Teresa), OCD	5 November 1887	Spain	23 May 1957	Aluva	Priest	14 January 1987	27 January 2014	Verapoly	Latin
	Sr. Maria Celine Kannanaikal, UMI	13 February 1931	Kundanoor, Trichur	26 July 1957	Kannur	Professed Religious	29 July 2007	5 August 2022	Kannur	Syro-Malabar
	Ven. Pedro Landeta Azcueta (Aureliano of the Blessed Sacrament), OCD	27 June 1887	Spain	16 November 1963	Aluva	Priest	17 December 1980	26 March 1999	Verapoly	Latin
	Ven. Joseph Vithayathil	23 July 1865	Puthenpally, Kerala	8 June 1964	Kuzhikkattussery, Kerala	Priest of the Eparchy of Trichur (now within the Eparchy of Irinjalakuda); Co-founder of the Congregation of the Holy Family	7 June 2004	14 December 2015	Irinjalakuda	Syro-Malabar
	Fr. Michael Koodalloor (Theophane of Kottappuram), OFM Cap.	20 July 1913	Kottapuram	4 April 1968	Ponnurinni, Ernakulam	Priest	10 January 2005	26 April 2026	Verapoly	Latin
	Ven. Francesco Convertini, SDB	29 August 1898	Marinelli, Italy	11 February 1976	Krishnagar	Priest	19 June 2006	20 January 2017	Krishnagar	Latin
	Ven. Stefano Ferrando, SDB	28 September 1895	Rossiglione, Genova, Italy	20 June 1978	Genova, Italy	Bishop of Shillong; Founder of the Missionary Sisters of Mary, Help of Christians	3 October 2003	3 March 2016	Shillong	Latin
	Bishop Oreste Marengo, SDB	29 August 1906	Diano d'Alba, Italy	30 July 1998	Tura	Bishop of Tura	12 April 2007	24 October 2026 (approval date)	Tura	Latin

== Servants of God ==
This section includes those who have been formally declared as a Servant of God by a bishop, or listed as a Servant of God by a conference of bishops.

Image	Name	Date of birth	Place of birth	Date of death	Place of death	Description	Declared servant of God	Diocese	Rite
	Antonio Pietro Criminali	7 February 1520	Sissa, Italy	26 May 1549	Vedhalai, Ramanathapuram	professed priest, Jesuits		Sivagangai	Latin
	Bl. Emmanuel d'Abreu, SJ	1708		12 January 1737	Tonkin	Priest; Martyr		Goa and Daman	Latin
	Constantine Joseph Beschi, SJ (Veeramamunivar)	8 November 1680	Mantua, Italy	4 February 1747	Kerala	priest	3 August 2025	Pondicherry and Cuddalore	Latin
	Michael [Michele] Ansaldo	29 September 1739	Messina, Italy	2 November 1805	Chennai, Tamil Nādu	professed priest, Jesuits; founder, Franciscan Sisters of Saint Aloysius Gonzaga	3 December 2020	Pondicherry-Cuddalore	Latin
	Fr. Nicolas-Michel Krick (fr), MEP and Fr. Augustin-Etienne Bourry (fr), MEP			2 August 1854	Somme Village, Khibito (India-China border)	Priests; Martyrs	2 August 2010	Miao	Latin
	Fr. Louis Savinien Dupuis (fr), MEP	18 August 1806	Sens, France	4 June 1874	Pondicherry	Priest; Founder of the Franciscan Sisters of the Immaculate Heart of Mary - Pondicherry and the Franciscan Sisters of the Immaculate Heart of Mary - Quilon	4 April 2016	Pondicherry and Cuddalore	Latin
	Thatipatri Gnanamma	1822	Guntur	21 December 1874	Kilacheri, Tamil Nadu	Widow; Founder of the Sisters of Saint Anne of Chennai and the Sisters of Saint Anne of Phirangipuram	21 March 2014	Madras and Mylapore	Latin
	Fr. Joseph Louis Ravel	24 August 1824	Valernes, France	31 January 1881	Coimbatore	Priest, founder of the Congregation of the Franciscan Sisters of the Presentation of Mary	14 January 2020	Coimbatore	Latin
	Annammal Selvanayagam Pillai	1836	Varaganeri, Trichy	8 June 1883	Melapudur, Trichy	Lay woman, Founder of the Sisters of Saint Anne of Trichy	3 November 2016	Trichy	Latin
	Constant Lievens, SJ	11 April 1856	Moorslede, Belgium	7 November 1893	Leuven, Belgium	Priest	15 March 2001	Ranchi	Latin
	Msgr. Francis Xavier Kroot, MHM	7 December 1854	Zwolle, Holland	5 January 1900	France	Founder of Sisters of Our Lady of Fatima	25 July 2007	Bellary	Latin
	Mary Grace D'Lima (Teresa of Saint Rose of Lima)	29 January 1858	Madras	12 September 1902	Cuddapah	Founder of the Carmelite Sisters of Saint Teresa	22 August 2015	Bangalore	Latin
	Sr. Marie-Gertrude of the Precious Blood Gros (Félicie Gros), SMMI	27 March 1850	Paris, France	18 March 1905	Dhaka, Bangladesh	co-foundress of SMMI	13 December 2012	Nagpur	Latin
	Augustine Pereira	11 February 1854	Tuticorin, Tamil Nadu	21 October 1911	N.Panjampatti, Dindigul District, Tamil Nadu	Founder of the Congregation of the Immaculate Conception	26 March 2015	Dindigul	Latin
	Fr. Silvio Pasquali, PIME	5 April 1864	Picenengo, Cremona, Italy	7 July 1924	Eluru	Priest; Founder of the Catechist Sisters of Saint Anne	25 April 2015	Eluru	Latin
	Henri Caumont (Fortunat of Tours)(fr)	10 December 1871	Tours, France	6 August 1930		Professed Priest,Franciscan Capuchins; Bishop of Ajmer; Founder, Prabhudasi Sisters of Ajmer – Handmaids of the Lord and the Mission Sisters of Ajmer	8 April 2022	Ajmer	Latin
	Fr. Adrian Caussanel, SJ	27 September 1850	Les Mazières, Lunac, Aveyron, France	22 February 1930	Palayamkottai, Tirunelveli, Tamil Nādu	Priest, founder of the Brothers of the Sacred Heart of Jesus	22 February 2021	Palayamkottai	Latin
	Fr. Varkey Kattarath, VC	31 October 1851	Poonjar, Kerala	24 October 1931	Thottakom, Kottayam	Professed Priest and Founder of the Vicentian Congregation	5 February 2020	Ernakulam-Angamaly	Syro-Malabar
	Fr. George Vakayil (Vakayilachan)	12 September 1883	Koonammavu	4 November 1931	Maradu, Cochin	Diocesan priest	1 September 2013	Verapoly	Latin
	Sebastian Lawrence Casimir Presentation Valiyathayil	10 August 1867	Arthunkal, Kerala	13 June 1936	Arthunkal, Kerala	Diocesan Priest, Founder of the Visitation Sisters of Alleppey	12 June 2013	Alleppey	Latin
	Charles from Ploemeur (Alfred Le Neouannis)	8 March 1870	Ploemeur, Morbihan (France)	6 August 1941	Ambapara, Banswara, Rajasthan	professed priest, Capuchin Franciscans	16 December 2020	Udaipur	Latin
	Adelrich Benziger (Aloysius of Saint Mary)	31 January 1864	Einsiedeln, Switzerland	17 August 1942	Trivandrum	Professed Priest of the Discalced Carmelites; Bishop of Quilon	20 October 2018	Quilon	Latin
	Thomas Poothathil	24 October 1871	Neendoor	4 December 1943	Kaipuzha	Priest; Founder of the Sisters of Saint Joseph's Congregation	26 January 2009	Kottayam	Syro-Malabar
	Joseph Thamby, OFS	September 1883	Pondicherry	15 January 1945	Pedavutapalli, Vijayawada	Layperson; Member of the Secular Franciscans	24 June 2007	Vijayawada	Latin
	Peter Reddy OFS, (Paul Chenappan Reddy or Peter Paradesi)	30 April 1895	Peraiur Ammapettai, Thirumangalam Taluk, Madurai	21 June 1958	Palayamkottai	Married Layperson; Member of the Secular Franciscans	9 October 2008	Palayamkottai	Latin
	Raymond Francis Camillus Mascarenhas	23 January 1875	Shimoga	23 December 1960	Bendur, Mangalore	Priest; Founder of the Sisters of the Little Flower of Bethany	3 May 2008	Mangalore	Latin
	Lawrence Puliyanath	8 August 1898	Mundamveli, Kochi	20 February 1961	Edakochi	Priest, Social Reformer	4 February 2011	Cochin	Latin
	Mary Bernadette Prasad Kispotta	2 June 1878	Saragaon, Ranchi	16 April 1961	Ranchi	Founder of the Daughters of Saint Anne of Ranchi	7 August 2016	Ranchi	Latin
	Fr. Antony Thachuparambil	8 December 1894	Kottat, Chalakudy	9 June 1963	Chelakkara	Priest	9 June 2009	Thrissur	Syro-Malabar
	Bastiampillai Anthonipillai Thomas	7 March 1889	Pandiyanthalvu, Sri Lanka	26 January 1964	Jaffna, Sri Lanka	professed priest, Missionary Oblates of Mary Immaculate; founder, Congregation of the Rosarians, Congregation of the Rosarian Sisters	11 March 2006	Bangalore	Latin
	Hermann Rasschaert (nl)	13 September 1922	Kampen, Overijssel, Netherlands	24 March 1964	Gerda, Jharkhand	Professed priest of the Jesuits, martyred by Hindus for protecting Muslims during a communal riot	25 August 2019	Simdega	Latin
	Fr. Antony Soosainather, CR	18 December 1882	Tuticorin	8 June 1968	Fatimagiri Asram, Vadakangulam	Priest	28 October 2010	Tuticorin	Latin
	Fr. Adeodatus of Saint Peter (Muthiyavila Valiyachan)	27 January 1896	Beveren, Belgium	20 October 1968	Thiruvananthapuram	professed priest of the Discalced Carmelites	20 October 2018	Neyyattinkara	Latin
	Thommachan Puthenparampil	8 July 1836	Edathuva, Alleppey	1 November 1968	Edathuva, Alleppey	Married Layperson; Member of the Secular Franciscans	29 June 2012	Changanacherry	Syro-Malabar
	Mathew Kavukatt	17 July 1904	Pravithanath	9 October 1969	Changanacherry	Archeparch of Changanacherry	25 September 1994	Changanacherry	Syro-Malabar
	Archbishop Joseph Attipetty	25 June 1894	Vypeen	21 January 1970	Ernakulam, Kerala, India	Archbishop of Verapoly	21 January 2020	Verapoly	Latin
	Msgr. George Fernandes	23 April 1903	Goa	2 June 1970	Bombay	Founder of the Poor Sisters of Our Lady (PSOL), priest of the Archdiocese of Bombay	14 September 2019	Bombay	Latin
	Fr. Lourdu Xavier Savarirayan	18 May 1910	Kovanda Kurichy, Thiruchirapalli	16 April 1972	Poondi	Priest	4 April 2016	Kumbakonam	Latin
	Philomena Vallayil (Mary Francesca de Chantal)	23 December 1880	Champakulam	25 May 1972		Founder of the Sisters of Adoration of the Blessed Sacrament	July 2018	Changanacherry	Syro-Malabar
	Fr. Louis Marie Leveil, SJ	6 April 1884	Laille, France	21 March 1973	Sarugani, Sivagangai	Priest	9 August 2016	Sivagangai	Latin
	Paula Monnigmann (Petra) [Dinadassi] (de)	14 June 1924	Oelde, Germany	5 June 1976	Pattuvam, Kannur	Founder of the Dina Sevana Sabha (Servants of the Poor)	14 June 2009	Kannur	Latin
	Fr. Valerian Guemes Rodriguez, C.M.	12 September 1890	Quintanarruz, Burgos, Spain	12 December 1978	Mohana, Odisha	Priest, Congregation of the Mission (Vincentians)	12 August 2023	Berhampur	Latin
	Fr. John Peter Savarinayagam, OFM. Cap.	29 May 1941	Thiruppanthruthi, Kumbakonam	2 March 1979	Chennai	Professed Priest of the Franciscan Capuchin (Amala Annai Province of Tamil Nadu)	3 December 2019	Kumbakonam	Latin
	Mariam Arampulickal (Sr. Mary Collett of the Infant Jesus), FCC	13 March 1904	Cherpunkal, Kottayam	18 December 1984	Maniamkunnu, Panachippara, Poonjar	professed religious, Franciscan Clarist Congregation	28 September 2021	Palai	Latin
	Reynolds Purackal	28 December 1910	Chethy, Alappuzha	14 October 1988	Alappuzha	Diocesan Priest	28 December 2010	Alleppey	Latin
	Ante Gabrić (hr)	1915	Croatia	1988	Kolkata	Professed Priest of the Jesuits	January 2016	Calcutta	Latin
	D. S. Amalorpavadass	15 June 1932	Kallery, Tamil Nadu	25 May 1990	Karnataka	Priest	20 October 2026	Pondicherry and Cuddalore	Latin
	Fr. Bruno Kaniyarakath (Atmavachan)	20 November 1894	Ramapuram, India	15 December 1991	Kurianad, India	Professed Priest of the Carmelites of Mary Immaculate	15 December 2021	Palai	Syro-Malabar
	Fr. Joseph Kandathil	27 October 1904	Chempu, Kerala	December 1991		Priest of the Archeparchy of Ernamkulam-Angamally; Founder of the Assisi Sisters of Mary Immaculate	2019	Ernakulam-Angamaly	Syro-Malabar
	Bishop Jerome Fernandez	8 September 1901	Koivila, Quilon	27 February 1992	Quilon	Bishop of Quilon	February 2019	Quilon	Latin
	Mary Celine Payyappilly	10 December 1906	Mallusserry, Kerala	23 April 1993	Karukutty, Kerala	Professed Religious of the Congregation of the Mother of Carmel	9 April 2018	Ernakulam-Angamaly	Syro-Malabar
	Mother (Annai) Scholastica (born Jesuvadiyal)	15 October 1917	Pattarivilai, Kanyakumari	12 October 1993		Religious, founder of the Sisters of the Sacred Heart of Jesus	19 July 2026	Vellore	Latin
	Peter John Roche (Alfred of Moodahadu)	3 April 1924	Barkur, Karnataka	31 December 1996	Mangalore	Professed Priest of the Franciscan Capuchin	October 2019	Udupi	Latin
	Fr. Ouseph Thekkekara (Canisius of Saint Teresa), CMI	12 May 1914	Anandapuram, Thrissur	29 January 1998	Kottackal, Mala	Priest	29 March 2014	Irinjalakuda	Syro-Malabar
	Armond Madhavath	25 November 1930	Nadavayal, Kerala	12 January 2001		Professed Priest of the Franciscan Capuchins	2019	Tellicherry	Syro-Malabar
	Immanuel Lopez	May 1908	Kochi	20 March 2004	Kochi	Vicar general of the Archdiocese of Verapoly	20 July 2023	Verapoly	Latin
	Bernhard Thanhauser (Fortunatus)	27 February 1918	Berlin Friedenau, Germany	21 November 2005	Kattapana	Professed Religious of the Hospitaller Brothers of Saint John of God; Founder of the Sisters of Charity of Saint John of God	22 November 2014	Kanjirapally	Latin
	Marian Zelazek, SVD	30 January 1918	Paledzie, Poland	30 April 2006	Puri, India	Priest	11 February 2018	Cuttack-Bhubaneswar	Latin
	Sr. Fidelis Thaliath S.D	29 February 1929	Puthenpally, Ernakulam, Kerala	17 January 2008	Delhi, India	Professed religious of the Sisters of the Destitute	14 July 2021	Faridabad	Syro-Malabar
	Kantheswar Digal and companions, martyrs of Kandhamal			August 2008 onwards		Priest and Laypersons; Martyred by Hindu nationalists over allegations of forced conversion of Adivasis & murder of a Hindu monk who opposed their missionary activities.	25 October 2023	Cuttack-Bhubaneswar	Latin
	Linus Maria Zucol	8 February 1916	Sarnonico, Italy	6 January 2014	Kozhikode, Kerala	professed priest, Jesuits	11 November 2022	Kannur	Latin

== Candidates for sainthood ==
This section includes those for whom a cause of sainthood or a diocesan investigation is in progress, but the person has not been declared as a Servant of God, although the term 'Servant of God' is sometimes used for such persons.

Name	Date of birth	Place of birth	Date of death	Place of death	Description	Diocese	Rite
Lorenz Hopfenmuller (Otto)	29 May 1844	Weismain, Germany	20 August 1890	Shillong	Professed Priest of the Salvatorians	Shillong	Latin
Emilian Vettath	26 February 1902	Kainakary, India	14 August 1994	Muttar, India	Professed Priest of the Carmelites of Mary Immaculate	Changanacherry	Syro-Malabar
Benedict Onamkulam	1929	Athirampuzha, Kottayam	3 January 2001		Priest of the Archeparchy of Changanacherry	Changanacherry	Syro-Malabar
Jean-Richard Mahieu (François) [Acharya]	17 January 1912	Ypres, Belgium	31 January 2002	Tiruvalla	Professed Priest of the Trappists	Tiruvalla	Syro Malankara
Amelia Cimolino	20 September 1912	Italy	19 June 2006	Mangalore	Professed Religious of the Sisters of Charity of Saints Bartolomea Capitanio and Vincenza Gerosa (Sisters of Holy Child Mary)	Mangalore	Latin

== Others ==
This section includes persons who are regarded to have led holy and edifying lives, but for whom there is no cause or formal investigation in progress. (Note: The 'others' section lists individuals whose reputations for holiness have been documented by reliable sources. Inclusion should require: At least one reliable source documenting a reputation for exceptional Christian holiness or sanctity, rather than merely a record of religious service, charitable work, or personal virtue, and preferably independent, secondary sources.; Evidence that this reputation extends beyond the individual's immediate family or religious community.; For people who died long ago, evidence that their reputation for holiness persisted over time.; Individuals described as martyrs must have reliable sources supporting that designation. A violent death alone does not establish martyrdom in the Catholic canonical sense.; Entries that do not cite evidences for the above criteria are liable to be removed.)

Image	Name	Date of birth	Place of birth	Date of death	Place of death	Description	Rite
	Zénon de Beaugé	1603	France	1687	India	Professed Priest of the Franciscan Capuchins	Latin
	Ephrem de Nevers	1607	France	1695	India	Professed Priest of the Franciscan Capuchins	Latin
	Fr. Jácome Gonsalves	8 June 1676	Divar, Goa	17 July 1742	Bolawatta, Sri Lanka	Oratorian priest, companion of St. Joseph Vaz	Latin
	Agnes McLaren	1837	England	1913	France	Layperson of the Archdiocese of St. Andrews and Edinburgh	Latin
	Francis Wilkinson (Marie de Borgia)	12 July 1912	Shimla	22 November 1942	Algeria	Professed religious, Missionary Sisters of Our Lady of Africa	Latin
	María Teresalina Sánchez (Joaquina de Zubiri Sánchez)	1918	Spain	1947	Baramulla, Jammu and Kashmir	Professed Religious of the Franciscan Missionaries of Mary; Martyr	Latin
	Augustina Kochumuttam	1940	India	1955	India	Professed Religious of the Sisters of Charity of Saint Bartolomea Capitanio and Vincenza Gerosa (Sisters of Holy Child Mary); Martyr	Latin
	Augustine Kandathil	1874	India	1956	India	Archbishop of Ernakulam; Founder of the Sisters of Saint Therese of Lisieux and the Sisters of Nazareth	Syro-Malabar
	Bridget Sequeira	1905	India	1987	India	Founder of the Franciscan Missionaries of Christ the King	Latin
	Louis Moolaveetil (Easo Mathew)	1934	India	1991	India	Professed Priest of the Order of the Imitation of Christ; Martyr	Syro-Malankara
	Alan Richard Griffiths (Swami Dayananda)	1906	England	1993	India	Professed Priest of the Benedictines (Camaldolese Congregation)	Latin
	Preeti Chalil	1950	India	1993	Nepal	professed religious, Sisters of Charity of Nazareth	Latin
	Thomas Anchanickal	1951	India	1997	India	Professed Priest of the Jesuits; Martyr	Latin
	Mother Maria Rosario of Jesus OCD	15 January 1893	Granada, Spain	28 February 1970	Thiruvalla, India	Professed Religious of Order of Discalced Carmelite, Foundress of first cloister carmel convents in Kerala	Latin
	Jose Nedumattathil	1962	India	1997	India	Professed Priest of the Salesians of Don Bosco; Martyr	Latin
	Albisia (Mary Aletta) Dungdung	1958	India	27 July 1998	Yemen	professed religious, Missionaries of Charity of Mother Teresa	Latin
	Pancratia (Mary Zilia) Minj	1963	India	27 July 1998	Yemen	professed religious, Missionaries of Charity of Mother Teresa	Latin
	Ansama Antony (Mary Aloise)	1964	India	1999	Sierra Leone	professed religious, Missionaries of Charity of Mother Teresa	Latin
	Anastasia Xalxo (Mary Indu)	1956	India	1999	Sierra Leone	professed religious, Missionaries of Charity of Mother Teresa	Latin
	Suresh Barwa	1983	India	2005	Jamaica	novice, Missionaries of the Poor	Latin
	Johnson (Prakash) Moyalan	1948	India	2008	Nepal	Professed Priest of the Salesians of Don Bosco; Martyr	Latin
	Thomas (Kunjumon) Pandippally	1971	India	16 August 2008	India	professed priest, Carmelites of Mary Immaculate	Syro-Malabar
	Valsa John Malamel	1958	India	2011	India	Professed Religious of the Sisters of Charity of Jesus and Mary; Martyr	Syro-Malabar
	Luigi (Luigino) Toffanin	1950	Italy	2013	India	Professed Priest of the Rogationists of the Heart of Jesus	Latin
	Nirmala Joshi	1934	Nepal	2015	India	Professed Religious of the Missionaries of Charity	Latin
	Cecilia (Mary Anselm) Minj	8 May 1956	India	4 March 2016	Yemen	professed religious, Missionaries of Charity of Mother Teresa	Latin
	Ajna George	2 April 1994	Kochi	21 January 2022	Kochi	Laywoman of the Archdiocese of Verapoly	Latin

== See also ==
- Catholic Church in India
- Christianity in India
- Beatification
- Venerable
- Servants of God
- Candidates for Sainthood
- List of Central American and Caribbean Saints
- List of Mexican Saints
- List of Saints from Africa
- List of Saints from Oceania
- List of Canadian Roman Catholic saints
- List of Saints from Asia
- List of American saints and beatified people
- Dicastery for the Causes of Saints
