= 1321 =

1321 in various calendars
- Gregorian calendar: 1321; MCCCXXI
- Ab urbe condita: 2074
- Armenian calendar: 770; ԹՎ ՉՀ
- Assyrian calendar: 6071
- Balinese saka calendar: 1242–1243
- Bengali calendar: 727–728
- Berber calendar: 2271
- English Regnal year: 14 Edw. 2 – 15 Edw. 2
- Buddhist calendar: 1865
- Burmese calendar: 683
- Byzantine calendar: 6829–6830
- Chinese calendar: 庚申年 (Metal Monkey); 4018 or 3811 — to — 辛酉年 (Metal Rooster); 4019 or 3812
- Coptic calendar: 1037–1038
- Discordian calendar: 2487
- Ethiopian calendar: 1313–1314
- Hebrew calendar: 5081–5082
- Hindu calendars
- Vikram Samvat: 1377–1378
- Shaka Samvat: 1242–1243
- Kali Yuga: 4421–4422
- Holocene calendar: 11321
- Igbo calendar: 321–322
- Iranian calendar: 699–700
- Islamic calendar: 720–721
- Japanese calendar: Gen'ō 3 / Genkō 1 (元亨元年)
- Javanese calendar: 1232–1233
- Julian calendar: 1321; MCCCXXI
- Korean calendar: 3654
- Minguo calendar: 591 before ROC 民前591年
- Nanakshahi calendar: −147
- Thai solar calendar: 1863–1864
- Tibetan calendar: ལྕགས་ཕོ་སྤྲེ་ལོ་ (male Iron-Monkey); 1447 or 1066 or 294 — to — ལྕགས་མོ་བྱ་ལོ་ (female Iron-Bird); 1448 or 1067 or 295

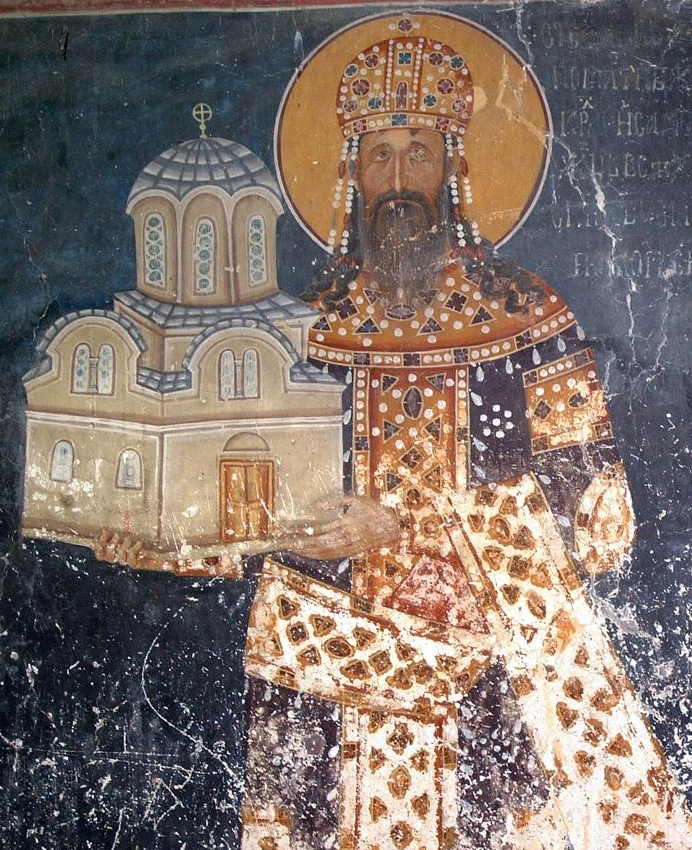
Stefan Milutin, in a 14th century fresco at the Studenica Monastery

Year 1321 (MCCCXXI) was a common year starting on Thursday of the Julian calendar.

== Events ==
=== January – March ===
- January 19 – King Edward II of England appoints the Archbishop of York; the Bishops of Carlisle, Worcester, and Winchester; the Earls of Pembroke, Hereford and Badlesmere; and six other people to negotiate with Scotland for a final peace treaty or an extension of the Pembroke treaty of 1319 before its expiration on Christmas Day.
- January 20 – The English Parliament appoints a commission to inquire about illegal confederacies in Wales against the King.
- January 30 – The Welsh Earls of Hereford, Arundel and Surrey, and 26 other people are forbidden from attending any meetings to discuss matters affecting King Edward II.
- February 10 – By papal verdict announced in the Polish town of Brześć, the Teutonic Knights are ordered to return the coastal region of Gdańsk Pomerania to Poland, having annexed and occupied it since 1308. The Teutonic Order appeals the judgment and continues fighting against Poland, with a new Polish–Teutonic War breaking out soon afterward.
- March 22 – The first Genkō era begins in Japan after the end of the Gen'ō era.

=== April – June ===
- April 8 – In the Delhi Sultanate of India, European Dominican missionaries who have accompanied Jordan Catala are killed while stranded on Salsette Island. Jordan escapes and continues his ministry.
- April 12 – Sweden's governing council votes to bar foreigners from the royal palace, and to request that the Norwegian council admonish the regent Ingeborg to avoid taking advice from foreigners when making decisions. Ingeborg, who is serving as regent for her minor son, King Magnus, ruler of Sweden and Norway, has become infamous for making decisions without consultation from the councils of either of the kingdoms.
- April 14 – Prince Wenceslaus of Płock allies with the Teutonic Knights of Poland and signs an agreement at the city of Golub, pledging to prevent Lithuanian troops from passing through his principality.
- April 19 – At Easter, the Byzantine civil war of 1321–1328 breaks out in the Byzantine Empire as Co-Emperor Andronikos III Palaiologos flees Constantinople to Adrianople, where he sets up his court and initiates an uprising against his grandfather, the Byzantine Emperor Andronikos II Palaiologos. The 24-year-old Andronikos is joined by Theodore Synadenos and John Kantakouzenos in the rebellion. Syrgiannes Palaiologos leads an expeditionary army towards the capital, forcing the emperor to negotiate.
- May 5 – Wars of the Rügen Succession: Dukes Otto I of Pomerania, Vartislav IV of Pomerania-Wolgast and Barnim III of Pomerania-Stettin reach a mutual inheritance contract with Vitslav III of Rügen.
- May 8 – In Egypt's Mamluk Sultanate, a campaign by Muslims starts against the Christian settlements of the Coptic Orthodox Church. Over 60 churches and monasteries are burned.
- May 16 – Johan de Bosco, a French person diagnosed with leprosy, claims that a fellow leper, "Geraldus" is attempting to spread their disease by contaminating wells, fountains, and rivers with bags of powder that will give leprosy to anyone who drinks from the water source. Rumors spread in southern France that French Jews are responsible, and is known as the 1321 lepers' plot.
- June 6 – Andronikos II Palaiologos concludes a peace agreement and divides the Byzantine Empire in two. Andronikos III is recognized as co-emperor and receives Thrace and Macedonia. He rewards his followers and gives them towns and regions to administer. Adrianople becomes the new capital.
- June 9 – Guillaume Agasse, the head of a leper house in Pamiers, claims in a statement to Bishop Jacques Founier (later Pope Benedict XII) that he had learned that more than fifty officials of leper houses had conspired with the Emirate of Granada to spread leprosy throughout France.
- June 21 – King Philip V of France orders that all lepers be imprisoned and interrogated. Those found guilty, often under torture, are to be burnt at the stake.
- June 23 – Pope John XXII approves a second inquiry into the matter of the canonization of Thomas Aquinas, with four commissioners to take testimony of witnesses.

=== July – September ===
- July 1 – María de Molina, grandmother of and regent for 12-year-old King Alfonso XI of Castile, dies at the age of 56, two relatives assume the regency and split Castile between themselves while chaos exists inside the Spanish kingdom. Alfonso's uncle, Don Juan Manuel de Ivrea, and cousin Juan de Castilla y Haro (called Juan el Tuerto or Juan the One-Eyed) remain in power until Alfonso XI reaches majority on 13 August 1325.
- July 15 – In England, the "Parliament of Whitebands" convenes with only 38 barons present, to remove suspect counsellors to the King.
- July 24 – A marriage contract is signed on behalf of Princess Euphemia, the 4-year-old sister of King Magnus of Sweden and Norway, and daughter of the regent Ingeborg of Norway, to eventually marry Albert of Mecklenburg the 3-year-old son of Henry I, Lord of Mecklenburg. The marriage will not take place until almost 15 years later.
- August 14 – King Edward II of England agrees to the demands from his barons to send Hugh Despenser the Elder and his son Hugh Despenser the Younger into exile. The Despensers helped Edward in the administration of his financial and land management affairs. This gives them both the opportunity to frustrate the ambitions of the barons and also the chance to enrich themselves.
- September 14 – Italian author Dante Alighieri, known for The Inferno, dies of malaria at Ravenna after having undertaken a diplomatic mission in the Republic of Venice.

=== October – December ===
- October 29 – King Stefan Milutin of Serbia dies after a 39-year reign. His son Stefan Konstantin claims the throne, but Konstantin's elder half-brother Stefan Dečanski starts a civil war and succeeds him.
- October 31 – Forces of Edward II of England capture Leeds Castle in Kent after Margaret de Clare, wife of Bartholomew Badlesmere, refuses Queen Isabella admittance in her husband's absence. When the Queen seeks to force an entry, Lady Badlesmere instructs her archers to shoot at Isabella and her party, six of whom are killed. After Edward occupies the castle, Lady Badlesmere becomes the first woman ever to be imprisoned in the Tower of London. She will be freed on November 3, 1322.
- November 10 – Canonization of Thomas Aquinas: In Italy, a second inquiry begins at Fossanova, as three commissioners (Pandulpho de Sabbello; Petrus Ferri, Bishop of Anagni; and Andreas, Bishop of Terracina) take testimony from over 100 witnesses until November 27.
- November 27 – In northern Italy, Rinaldo dei Bonacolsi, Duke of Mantua, begins the siege of Mirandola against Francesco I Pico, Duke of Mirandola. Bonaclsi has Pico and his sons Francesco and Tommasino arrested and imprisoned in the Castel d'Ario. A siege of the castle begins the next day and lasts 33 days.
- December 8 – Confronting the rebellion of Thomas of Lancaster (his cousin), the Baron Badlesmere and Roger Mortimer, King Edward II of England arrives in Cirencester, then leads troops up the Severn Valley from Gloucester against the rebels.
- December 26 – Faced with an invasion of London during the rebellion of Thomas of Lancaster, by troops led by the English rebel, the Baron Badlesmere, King Edward II of England offers safe conduct for any rebels who come over to the royalist side, but orders the Sheriff of Gloucester to arrest Badlesmere.
- December 28 (Genko 1, 9th day of 12th month) – In Japan, Emperor Go-Daigo begins direct government as the cloistered rule of former Emperor Go-Uda ceases.
- December 31 – The Duke of Mantua completes the siege of Mirandola, taking control of the Duchy, and then orders the castle of Duke Francesco I Pico to be destroyed.
- Winter – Byzantine civil war of 1321–1328: Syrgiannes Palaiologos switches support to Andronikos II Palaiologos, fleeing to Constantinople. Rewarded with the title of megas doux, he convinces the emperor to resume the war against Andronikos III.

=== Undated ===
- The Anatolian Beylik of Teke, a frontier principality, is established by the Oghuz Turks after the decline of the Seljuk Sultanate of Rum.

=== By topic ===
==== Education ====
- The University of Florence is established by the Republic of Florence.

==== Religion ====
- The Gračanica Monastery is founded by King Stefan Milutin, nicknamed "The Saint King", on the ruins of a 6th-century basilica, located in Kosovo.
- The Spitakavor Monastery, near the Armenian town Yeghegnadzor, is completed.

==== Literature ====
- May 4 – The German play Ludus de decem virginibus, a dramatization of the New Testament Parable of the Ten Virgins, is first performed.
- Approximate date – The Kebra Nagast ("The Glory of the Kings") is translated from Arabic to Ge'ez, according to its colophon.

== Births ==
- January 6 – William de Greystoke, English landowner (d. 1359)
- February 5 – John II, Marquess of Montferrat, Italian nobleman (d. 1372)
- July 5 – Joan of the Tower, queen consort of Scotland (d. 1362)
- August 7 – Bande Nawaz, Indian Sufi scholar and writer (d. 1422)
- August 29 – John of Artois, Count of Eu, French nobleman (d. 1387)
- date unknown
  - Al-Mansur Abu Bakr, Mamluk ruler of Egypt and Syria (d. 1341)
  - He Zhen, Chinese nobleman, general, and politician (d. 1388)
  - James I, Aragonese nobleman (House of Barcelona) (d. 1347)
  - Johann Wittenborg, German merchant and politician (d. 1363)
  - John III of Trebizond ("Megas Komnenos"), Emperor of Trebizond (d. 1362)
  - Louis I of Brzeg ("Louis the Wise"), Polish nobleman from the (House of Piast) (d. 1398)
  - Nicholas, Count of Holstein-Rendsburg, German nobleman and co-ruler (d. 1397)
  - Zhang Shicheng, Chinese rebel leader and ruler (d. 1367)

== Deaths ==
- January 13 – Bonacossa Borri, Italian noblewoman (b. 1254)
- March 18 – Matthew III Csák, Hungarian nobleman and knight
- April 9 – (The "Four Martyrs of Thane"):
  - Demetrius of Tiflis, Georgian monk and religious leader
  - James of Padua, Italian monk, preacher and missionary
  - Peter of Siena, Italian monk, preacher and missionary
  - Thomas of Tolentino, Italian preacher and missionary
- April 17 – Blanche of Portugal, Portuguese princess (b. 1259)
- April 22 – Bolesław of Oleśnica, Polish nobleman and co-ruler
- April 27 – Nicolò Albertini, Italian friar, cardinal and statesman
- May 31 – Birger Magnusson, king of Sweden (House of Bjälbo)
- July 1 – María de Molina, queen of Castile and León (b. 1265)
- July 23 – Thomas de Berkeley, English nobleman and diplomat
- July 31 – Ibn al-Banna' al-Marrakushi, Almohad mathematician
- August 18 – Rinaldo da Concorezzo, Italian archbishop (b. 1245)
- September 3 – Walter II, Dutch nobleman and co-ruler (b. 1283)
- September 14 – Dante Alighieri, Italian poet and writer (b. 1265)
- October 29 – Stefan Milutin, Serbian king (b. 1253)
- November 9 – Walter Langton, English cleric and bishop (b. 1243)
- November 25 – Nicholas Seagrave, English nobleman and knight
- November 27 – Kunigunde of Bohemia, Czech princess (b. 1265)
- date unknown
  - Bonacossa Borri, Italian noblewoman (House of Visconti)
  - Edmund Butler, Irish Chief Butler, magnate and politician
  - Gregory of Raska, Serbian bishop and translator (b. 1275)
  - Grigorije II of Ras, Serbian monk-scribe, bishop, and saint
  - Guillaume Bélibaste, French preacher and Cathar Perfect
  - James of Lausanne, French superior, theologian and writer
  - Muhammad ibn Rushayd, Almohad scholar, judge, and writer
  - Reginald of Burgundy, French nobleman, knight and co-ruler
  - Sinka Sebesi, Hungarian nobleman, landowner and co-ruler
  - Witte van Haemstede, Dutch nobleman and prince (b. 1281)
