= John Nellikunnel =

Indian bishop

Mar John Nellikunnel
- Eparch of Syro-Malabar Catholic Eparchy of Idukki
- Church: Syro-Malabar Church
- Appointed: 12 January 2018
- Installed: 5 April 2018
- Predecessor: Mathew Anikuzhikattil

Orders
- Ordination: 30 December 1998 by George Punnakottil
- Consecration: 5 April 2018 by George Alencherry

Personal details
- Born: John Nellikunnel; 22 March 1973 (age 53) Kadaplamattom, Kerala, India
- Denomination: Syro Malabar

John Nellikunnel (born 22 March 1973) is an Indian bishop of the Syro-Malabar Catholic Church who serves as the Eparch of the Syro-Malabar Catholic Eparchy of Idukki since his installation in 2018.

== Biography ==
John Nellikunnel was born on 22 March 1973 in Kadaplamattom, Kerala to Varkey and Mary Nellikunnel. He has one sister who is a nun, and two brothers. One of his brothers Mathew Nellikunnel was appointed Eparch of the Eparchy of Gorakhpur, making history as the first two brothers to serve together in the Syro-Malabar Synod of Bishops. Nellikunnel went to St. Mary’s High School, Mariapuram before in 1988 when he began his priestly formation at the Minor Seminary of the Eparchy of Kothamangalam. He attended the St. Thomas Apostolic Seminary, Vadavathoor for the philosophical and theological studies. He was then ordained as a Priest by George Punnakottil on 30 December 1998. He served in various assistant pastor roles in the Eparchy before going back for studies at the Pontifical Gregorian University in Rome for a Licentiate in Philosophy and a Doctorate in Philosophy from the Pontifical University of Saint Thomas Aquinas. He then came back to India for Pastoral duties until in 2010 when he was appointed the Eparchial Chancellor and Secretary to the Bishop by Mathew Anikuzhikattil. Along with these duties he was the Head of the Catechetical Department and Bible Apostolate along with being a resident staff at St. Joseph’s Pontifical Seminary, Mangalapuzha where he served as the Seminary Procurator. In 2015, He was appointed the Seminary's dean.

In 2018, he was appointed to succeed Mathew Anikuzhikattil as the Eparch of the Syro-Malabar Catholic Eparchy of Idukki. He was ordained by Cardinal George Alencherry on 5 April 2018.
