= Dominic Kokkat =

Indian Syro-Malabar Catholic prelate (1932–2026)

His Excellency Dominic Kokkat
- Bishop Emeritus of Gorakhpur
- Archdiocese: Faridabad
- Diocese: Gorakhpur
- Appointed: 19 June 1984
- Term ended: 15 July 2006
- Predecessor: Position established
- Successor: Thomas Thuruthimattam

Orders
- Ordination: 4 October 1960
- Consecration: 4 October 1984 by Joseph Parecattil, Antony Padiyara and Patrick Paul D’Souza

Personal details
- Born: 23 February 1932 Vaikom, Travancore, India
- Died: 25 January 2026 (aged 93) Gorakhpur, Uttar Pradesh, India
- Motto: God is my Light and my Salvation

Dominic Kokkat C.S.T. (23 February 1932 – 25 January 2026) was an Indian Syro-Malabar Catholic prelate.

== Biography ==
Kokkat joined the Little Flower Congregation in 1953. He attended seminaries in Kandy, Sri Lanka and in Pune. On 4 October 1960, he received the sacrament of priestly ordination and from then on worked for his order in various positions.

Pope John Paul II appointed him on 19 June 1984 as the first bishop of the eparchy of Gorakhpur. The Archbishop Emeritus of Ernakulam, Cardinal Joseph Parecattil, consecrated him bishop on 4 October of the same year in the Cathedral Basilica of St. Mary in Ernakulam. His co-consecrators were the Archbishop of Changanacherry, Antony Padiyara, and the Bishop of Varanasi, Patrick Paul D'Souza.

Due to his devotion to Therese of Lisieux and his own religious experiences, he founded the Congregation of the Little Sisters of St. Therese (LST) in 1988. On 15 July 2006, Kokkat resigned from his office due to age.

Kokkat died at Fatima Hospital in Gorakhpur, on 25 January 2026, at the age of 93.

Catholic Church titles
Preceded by Position established	Bishop of Gorakhpur; 1984–2006	Succeeded by Thomas Thuruthimattam
