= Cheranalloor Mahadeva Temple =

Hindu temple in Kerala, India

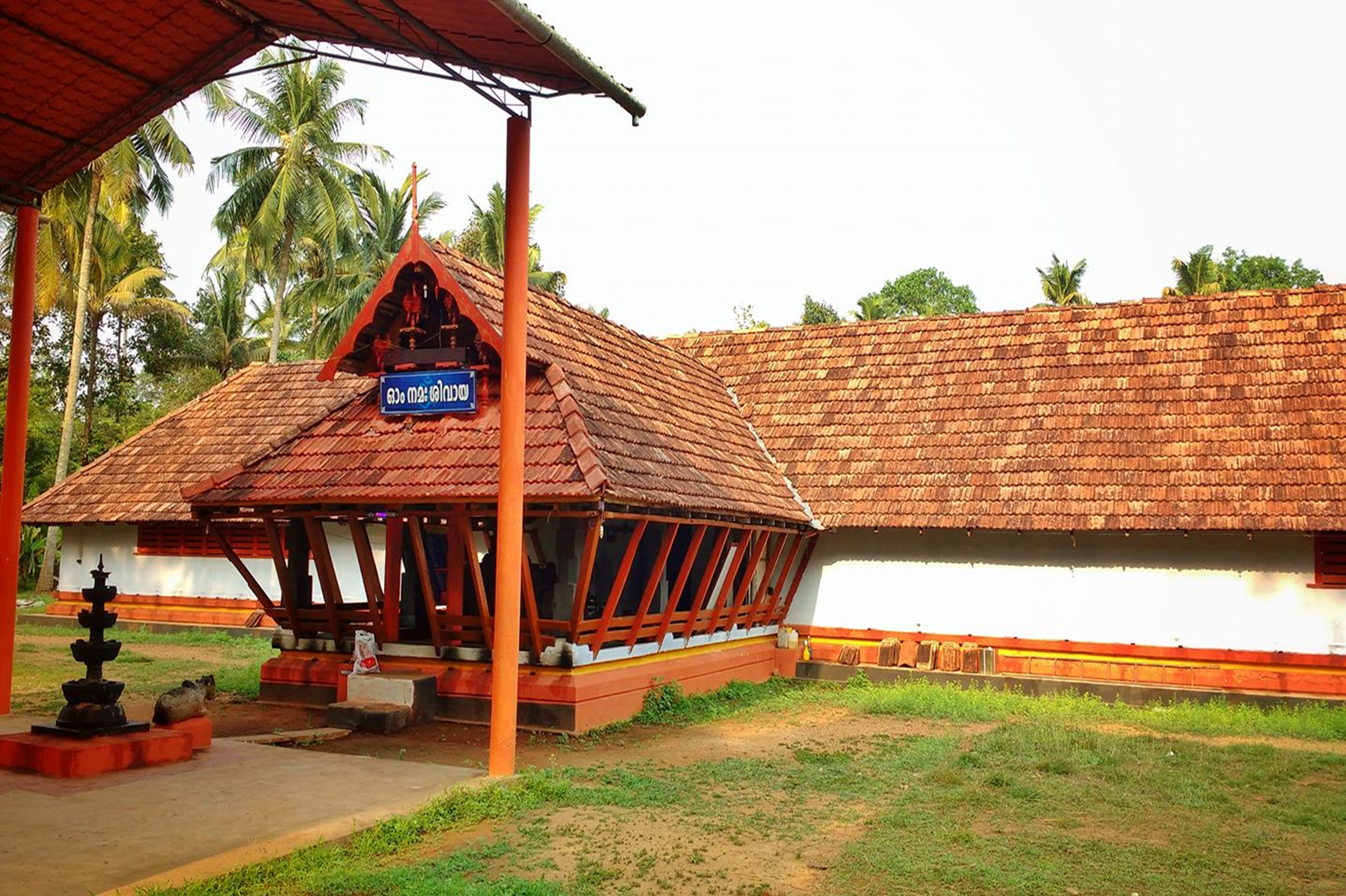
- Temple Nalambalam

- Mahadeva Temple, Cheranalloor, Ernakulam, Kerala

Religion
- Affiliation: Hinduism
- District: Ernakulam
- Deity: Shiva
- Festival: Maha Shivaratri

Location
- Location: Cheranalloor, Kalady
- State: Kerala
- Country: India
- Interactive map of Cheranalloor Mahadeva Temple
- Coordinates: 10.178293°N 76.471724°E

Architecture
- Type: Kerala style
- Completed: Not known

Specifications
- Temple: One
- Monument: 1
- Elevation: 38.16 m (125 ft)

Website
- http://cheranalloorshivatemple.com/

Cheranalloor Mahadeva Temple is an ancient Hindu temple dedicated to Shiva is situated on the banks of the Periyar river at Kalady of Ernakulam District in Kerala state in India. The Cheranalloor Mahadeva Temple is one of the important temples in Cochin Kingdom. According to folklore, sage Parashurama has installed the idol of Shiva in the Treta Yuga. The temple is a part of the 108 Shiva Temples in Kerala.

== Temple Structure ==
The temple is dedicated to Shiva in the main Sanctum Sanctorum facing east. The main shrine, which has been built in circular shape, is a beautiful in Kerala-Dravidian architecture style. In the eastern porch, the namaskara mandapom has been built in a square-shaped structure. The size of the nalambalam is remarkable and the adjacent thidappalli have been rebuilt. The temple of Cheranelloor is constructed of great craftsmanship in architecture and we can see a rare collection of architecture as well.

In ancient times, the Cheranelloor Mahadeva temple had extensive land holdings and was in receipt of approximately 24 tons of paddy (24 thousands hector land) a year. Consequent to agrarian reforms the temple lost all the land except a couple of acres in which the temple is situated.

== Festival and daily pooja ==
There are five poojas here on a regular basis. (Usha pooja, Ethrtha pooja, Pantheerati pooja, Noon pooja and Athazha pooja). The annual festival of the temple is usually celebrated in the month of Malayalam Kumbha (February - March). It believe that Shiva in Cheranellor is situates together with Devi Sati. So it is believed that the temple main deity is in the form of rina mochaka that bearing the idea of resolving all debts of the devotees. The rina mochaka pooja is performed daily in the temple.

== See also ==
- Temples of Kerala

== Temple Photos ==
Cheranalloor Mahadeva Temple

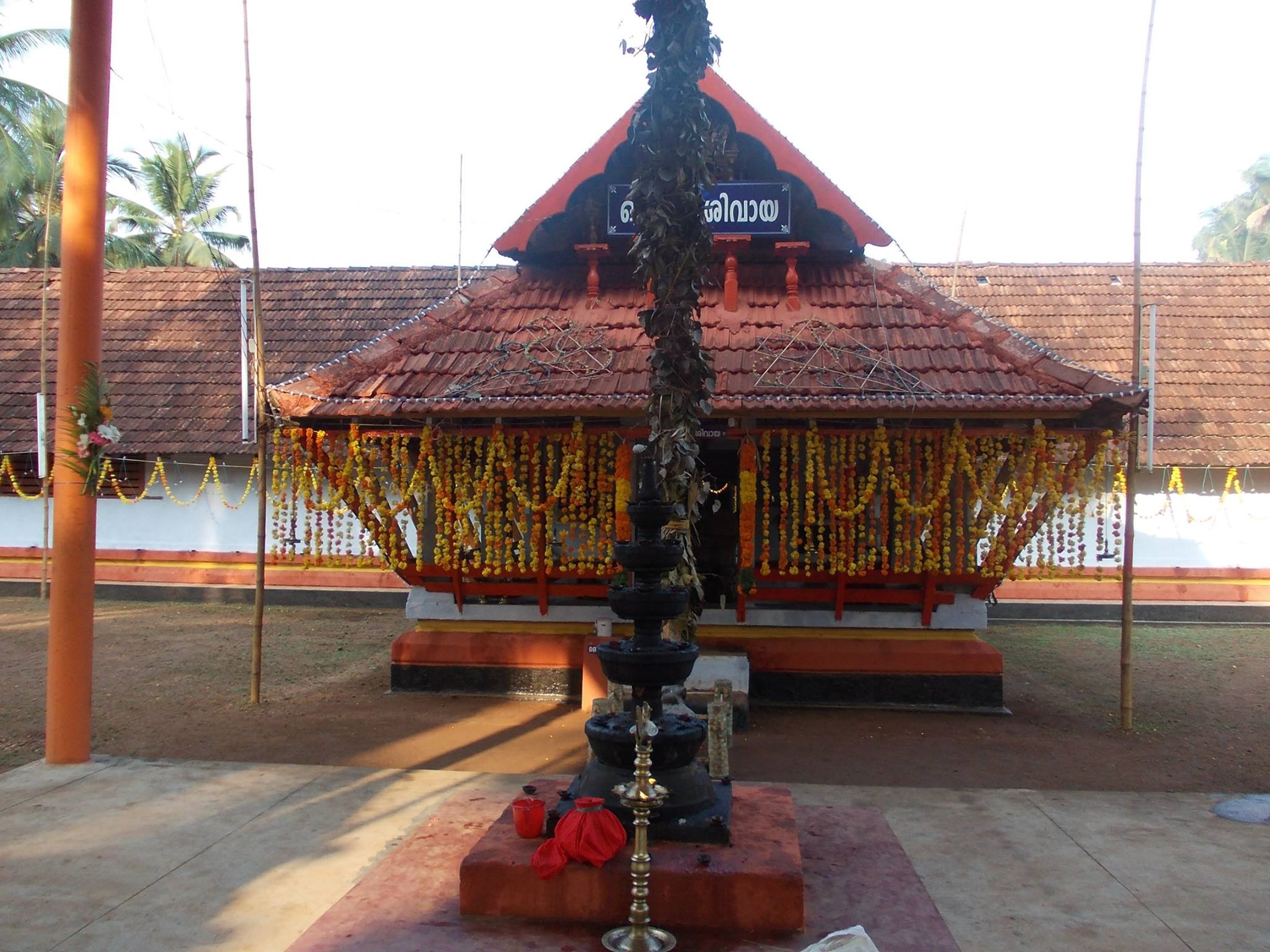
Balikal pura

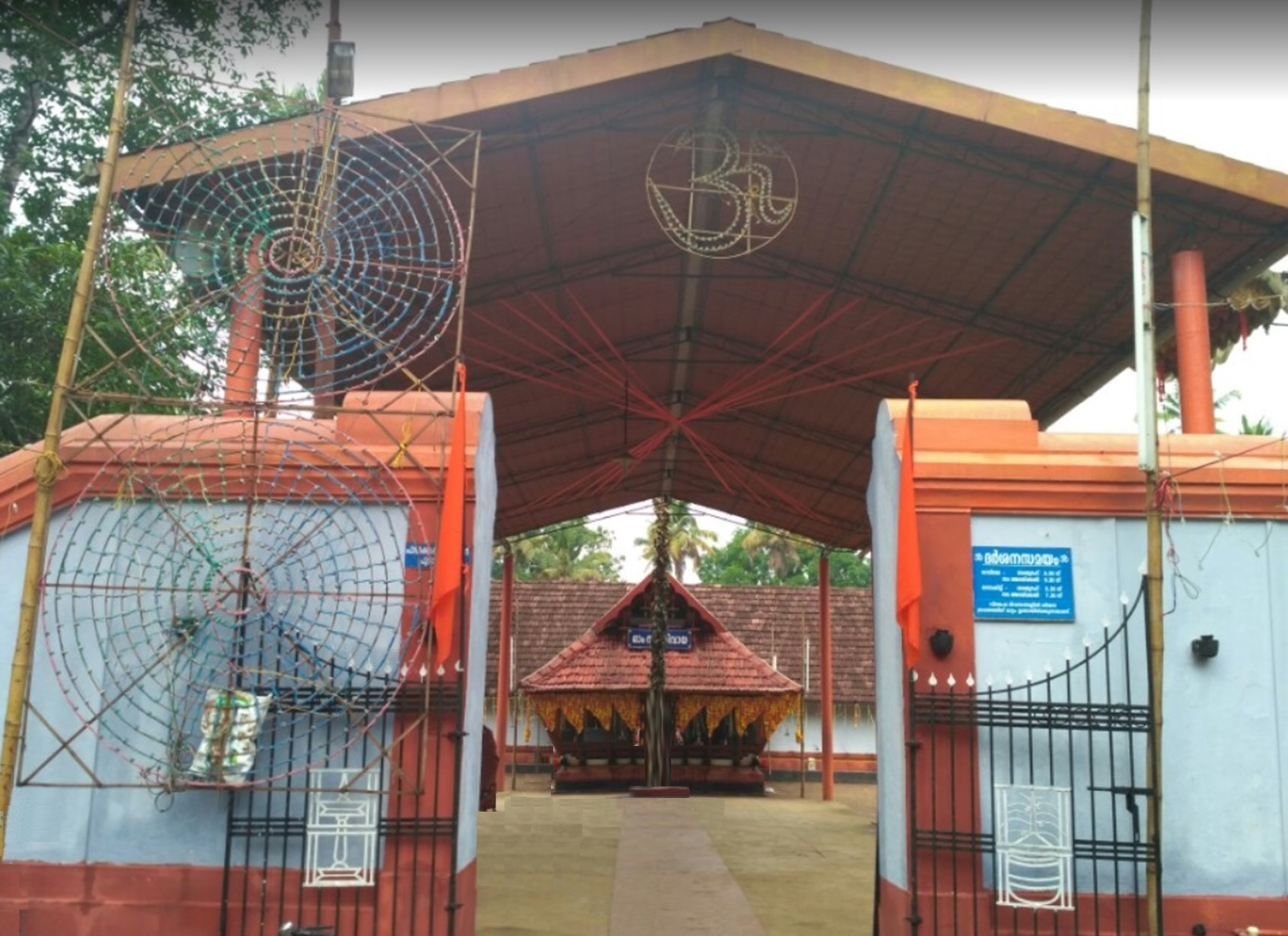
Main entrance

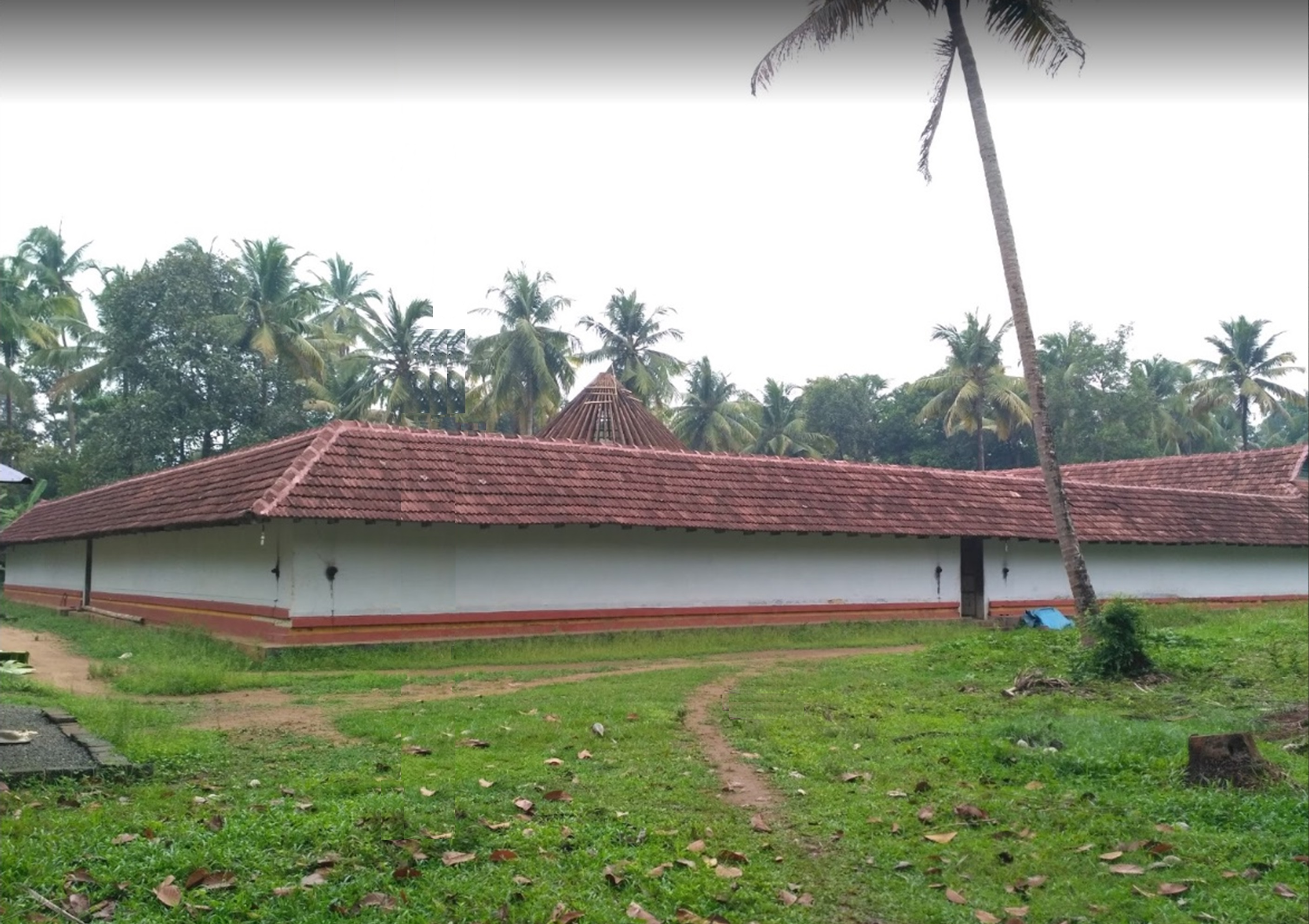
Nalambalam

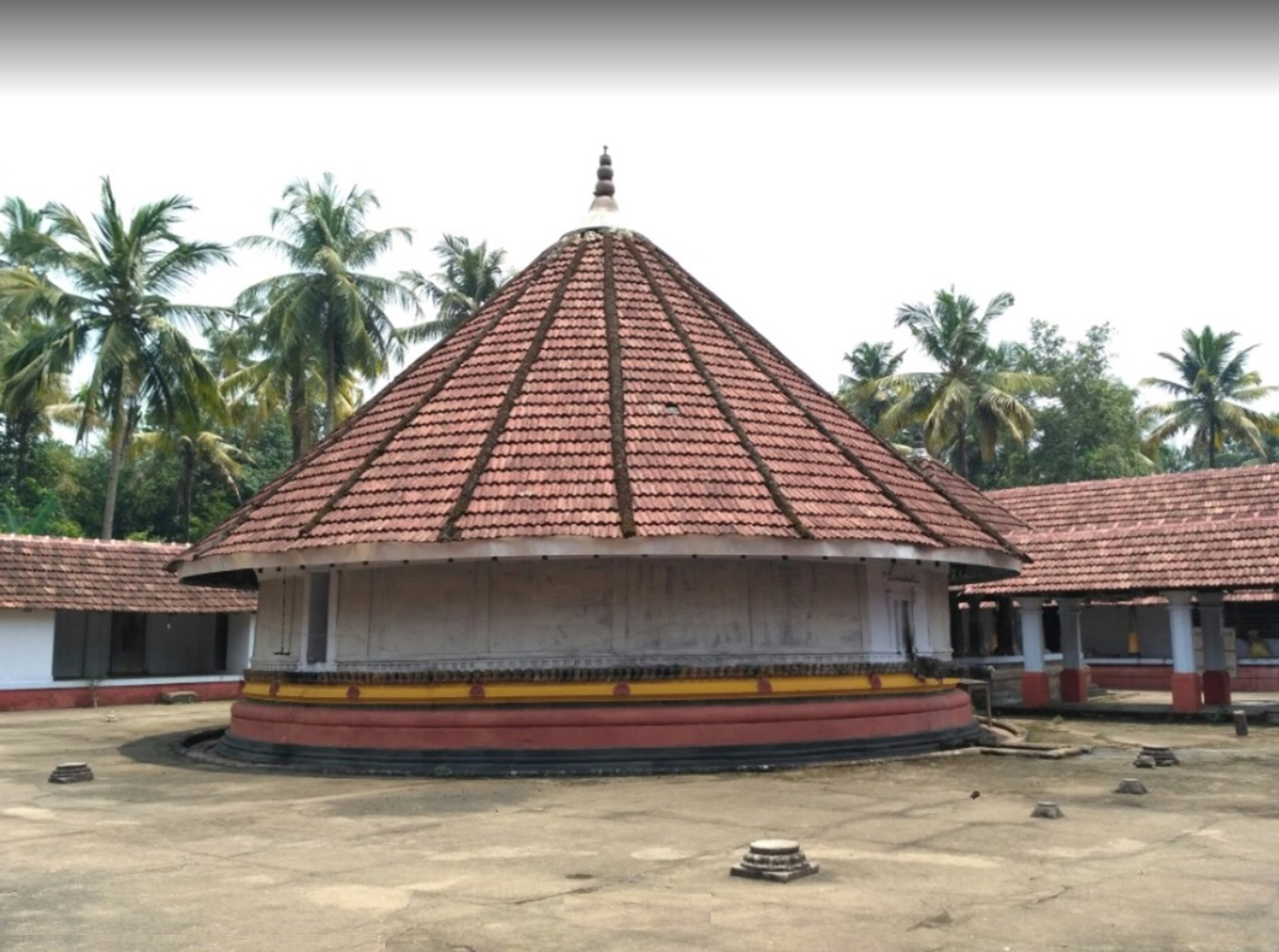
Sreekovil
(Sanctum Sanctorum)

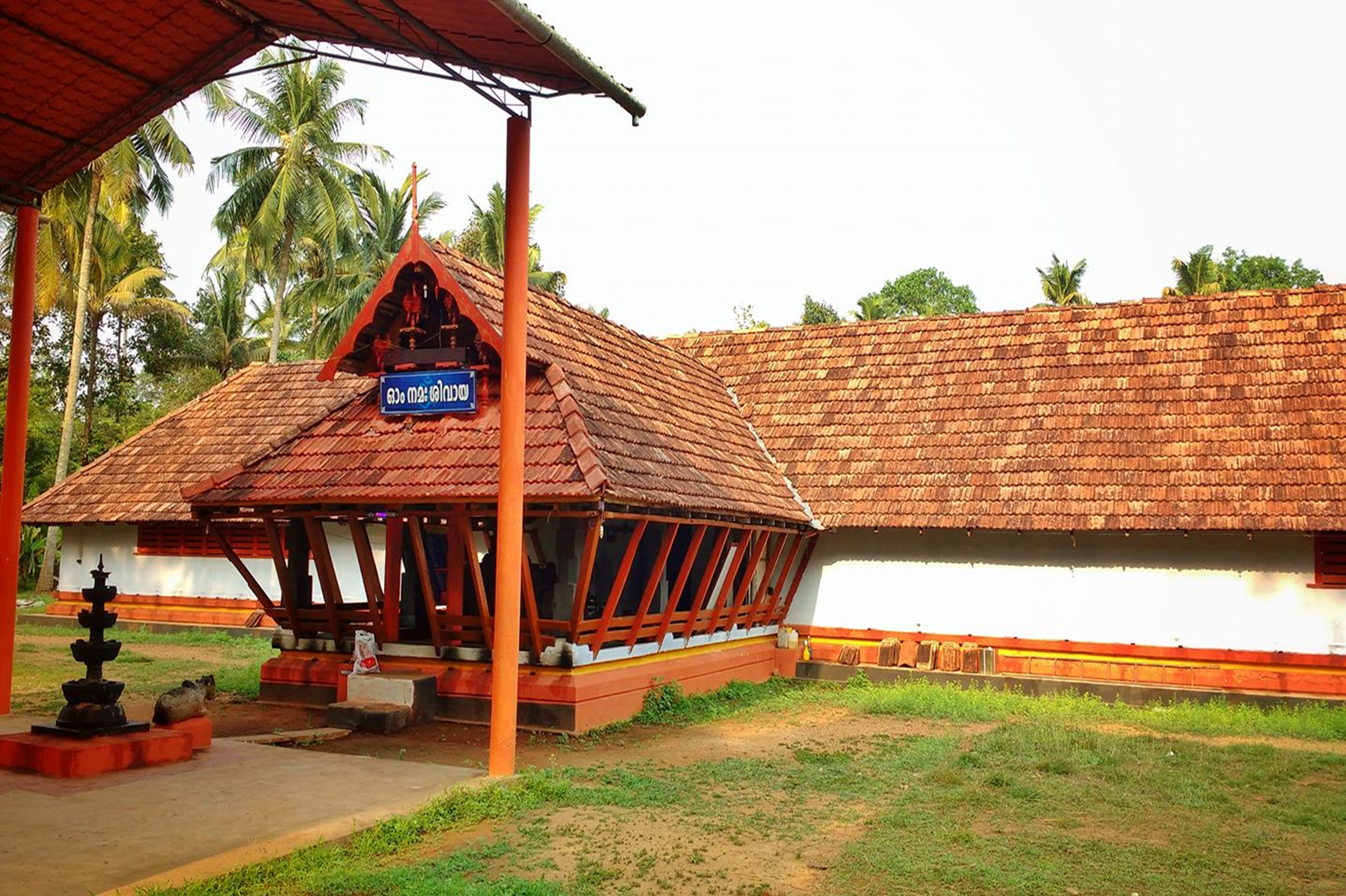
East Nalambalam
