= Cheranalloor East =

- Village
- Location in Kerala, India Cheranalloor East (India)
- Coordinates: 10°9′0″N 76°28′45.10″E
- Country: India
- State: Kerala
- District: Ernakulam
- Talukas: Kunnathunadu

Languages
  - Official: Malayalam, English
- Time zone: UTC+5:30 (IST)
- PIN: 683544
- Telephone code: 0484
- Vehicle registration: KL-40
- Vidhan Sabha constituency: Perumbavoor

Cheranalloor (East) is a village in Ernakulam District, Kerala, India. It lies on the banks of Periyar River near Kalady. East Cheranalloor should not be confused with Cheranalloor on the northern outskirts of Kochi. According to tradition, the village was named by its earlier inhabitants who found this place very fertile and beautiful. The name in its local language Malayalam means "Good place to join".

== History ==
Cheranalloor was a part of Cochin kingdom and the ruler was known as "Cheranallor Karthavu", he was the head of the "Anchi Kaimals", KP Padmanabha Menon in his History of Kerala, Vol 2 mentions the Anji Kaimals whose Chief was the Cheranellur Kartha as owning all of Eranakulam. In fact, Eranakulam is known as Anji Kaimal in the early maps of Kerala. See Dutch in Malabar (Dutch Records No 13), 1910 shows a map from AD1740 that shows the area of AnjiKaimal as almost twice as large as the Cochin State.

== Landmarks ==
- St. Francis Xavier Church
- Cheranalloor Shiva Temple
- Church UP school
- South Indian Bank Branch
