= Benedict Onamkulam =

Benedict Onamkulam (1929–2001) was an Indian priest who was convicted of the murder, rape and impregnation of a woman in 1960 and sentenced to death. He was acquitted in 1967 due to a lack of evidence.

== See also ==
- Madatharuvi case
