= Eparchy of Bijnor =

Syro-Malabar Catholic territory in India

Location
- Country: India
- Ecclesiastical province: Archeparchy of Faridabad

Statistics
- Area: 30,664 km^{2} (11,839 sq mi)
- Population: Total; Catholics: (as of 2012); 3,488,000; 4,300 (0.1%)
- Parishes: 53

Information
- Denomination: Syro-Malabar Church
- Sui iuris church: Syro-Malabar Catholic Church
- Rite: East Syriac Rite
- Established: 23 March 1972
- Cathedral: Cathedral of St Joseph in Kotdwar

Current leadership
- Pope: Mar Leo XIV
- Major Archbishop: Mar Raphael Thattil
- Bishop: Mar Vincent Nellaiparambil
- Metropolitan Archbishop: Mar Kuriakose Bharanikulangara
- Bishops emeritus: John Vadakel

Website
- Website of the Diocese

The Eparchy of Bijnor is a Syro-Malabar Catholic Church ecclesiastical territory or eparchy of the Catholic Church in Uttarakhand, India. Its current eparch is the Mar Vincent Nellaiparambil, who was consecrated bishop on 1 November 2019.

With an area of 30,664 square kilometers, this eparchy has 49 mission stations, 25 schools, 16 health centres and dispensaries and 5 boarding houses. Personnel include 61 priests, 212 religious sisters, and 28 diocesan brothers.

== History ==
The eparchy of Bijnor was originally an apostolic exarchate, created on 23 March 1972 by the papal bull Beatorum Apostolorum of Pope Paul VI. Rev. Fr Gratian Mundadan CMI was appointed the apostolic exarch. The apostolic exarchate of Bijnor was bifurcated from the diocese of Meerut. It consisted of the civil districts of Bijnor (excluding the tehsil of Dhampur), Pauri, Tehri, Uttarkashi and Chamoli of the then state of Uttar Pradesh. Later the district of Haridwar was created taking parts of Bijnor and Saharanpur, and the district of Rudraprayag was created by dividing the district of Pauri. In 2000, when the new state of Uttarakhand was created, the districts of Pauri, Tehri, Uttarkashi, Chamoli, Rudraprayag, and Haridwar became part of the new state. At present the eparchy of Bijnor consists of a part of the district of Bijnor in Uttar Pradesh and districts of Pauri, Rudraprayag, Chamoli, Tehri, Uttarkashi and a part of Haridwar in Uttarakhand.

Pope Paul VI raised the apostolic exarchate of Bijnor to an eparchy by the papal bull Quae cum Romano on 26 February 1977, and Apostolic Exarch Gratian Mundadan CMI was appointed its first bishop.

== Eparchy timeline ==
23 March 1972 – Erection of Apostolic Exarchate of Bijnor by the papal bull Beatorum Apostolorum of Pope Paul VI. Nomination of Fr Gratian Mundadan CMI as the Apostolic Exarch.
25 July 1972 – Fr Gratian Mundadan CMI took charge as the Apostolic Exarch of Bijnor.
26 February 1977 – Erection of the Diocese of Bijnor by the Papal Bull Quae Cum Romano of Pope Paul VI. Nomination of Apostolic Exarch Gratian Mundadan CMI as the first Bishop of Bijnor.
6 November 1977 – Episcopal Ordination of Most Rev. Gratian Mundadan CMI.
8 December 1977 – Enthronement of Most Rev. Gratian Mundadan CMI as the first Bishop of Bijnor.
18 May 1981 – Death of 10 Missionaries in road accident at Satpuli.
24 June 1984 – Inauguration of the Diocesan Minor Seminary.
19 April 1988 – Priestly ordination of Fr James Thekkekaithackal, the first diocesan priest.
26 January 1997 – Death of Fr Peter Moothedan in road accident at Nawada (Bijnor).
5 December 2001 – Foundation stone laid for St Joseph's Cathedral, Kotdwar.
17 February 2002 – Silver Jubilee celebrations of the Diocese and the Episcopal ordination of Most Rev. Gratian Mundadan.
19 November 2002 – Blessing of UJALA: The Diocesan Pastoral Centre.
17 October 2006 – Death of Fr Mathew Parackal, the Protosyncellus of the Diocese, at Bijnor.
4 June 2008 – Priestly Ordination of Fr Francis Paul Masih, the first local priest of the diocese.
14 August 2009 – Nomination of Fr John Vadakel CMI as the second Bishop of Bijnor.
22 October 2009 – Episcopal ordination and enthronement of Most Rev. John Vadakel CMI.
30 August 2019 – Most Rev. John Vadakel CMI retired.
1 November 2019 – Episcopal consecration / ordination and enthronement of Most Rev. Vincent Nellaiparambil.

== Prelates ==
Bishops

Sl.no	Name	Designation	Year of appointment	Last year of service
1	Gratian Mundadan CMI	Bishop	1972	2009
2	John Vadakel CMI	Bishop	2009	2019
3	Vincent Nellaiparambil	Bishop	2019	Present
