= Varapuzha Bridge =

Bridge in India

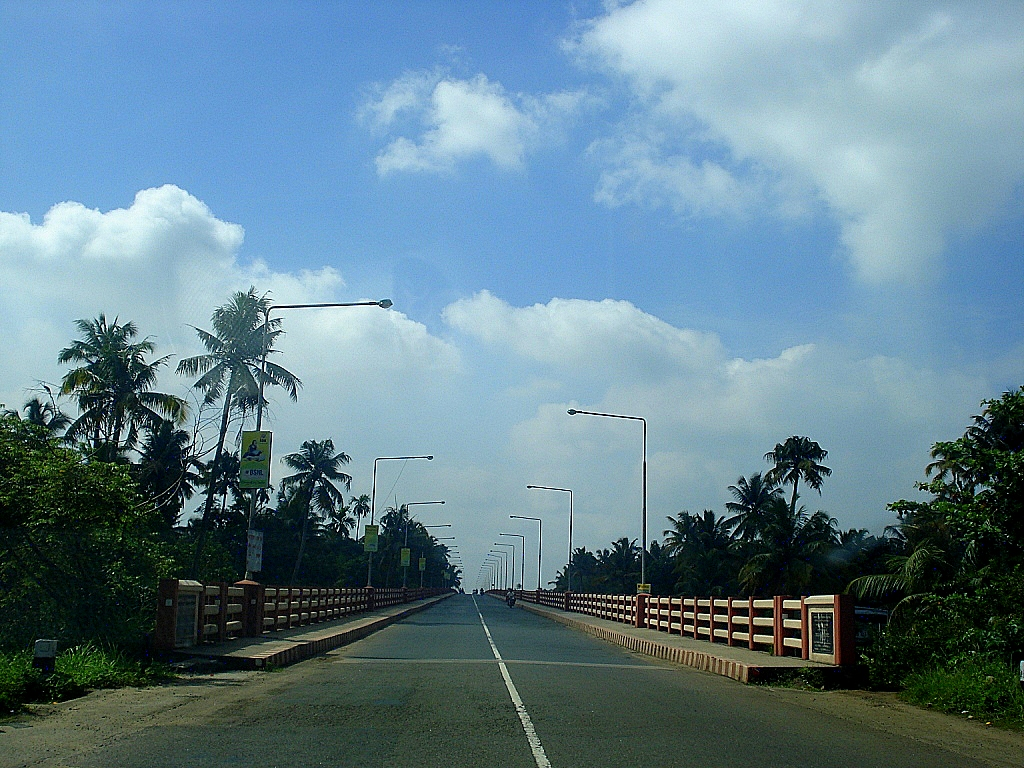
Varapuzha Bridge

The Varapuzha bridge on NH 17 is a cantilever bridge spanning the Periyar River between Varappuzha and Cheranallur in Kochi, India. Varapuzha Bridge is the first bridge in Kerala to be constructed using Balanced Cantilever technique (120m span) and also the first bridge in Kerala where Caisson floating technique was adopted. The construction of the bridge won the National award for the Most Outstanding Bridge(1999) of Indian Institution of Bridge Engineers On 16 January 2001, Varapuzha Bridge was opened to traffic. This bridge reduces the distance between Malabar and Kochi.
