= Joseph Thamby =

Indian Servant of God (1890–1945)

Servant of God Joseph Thamby
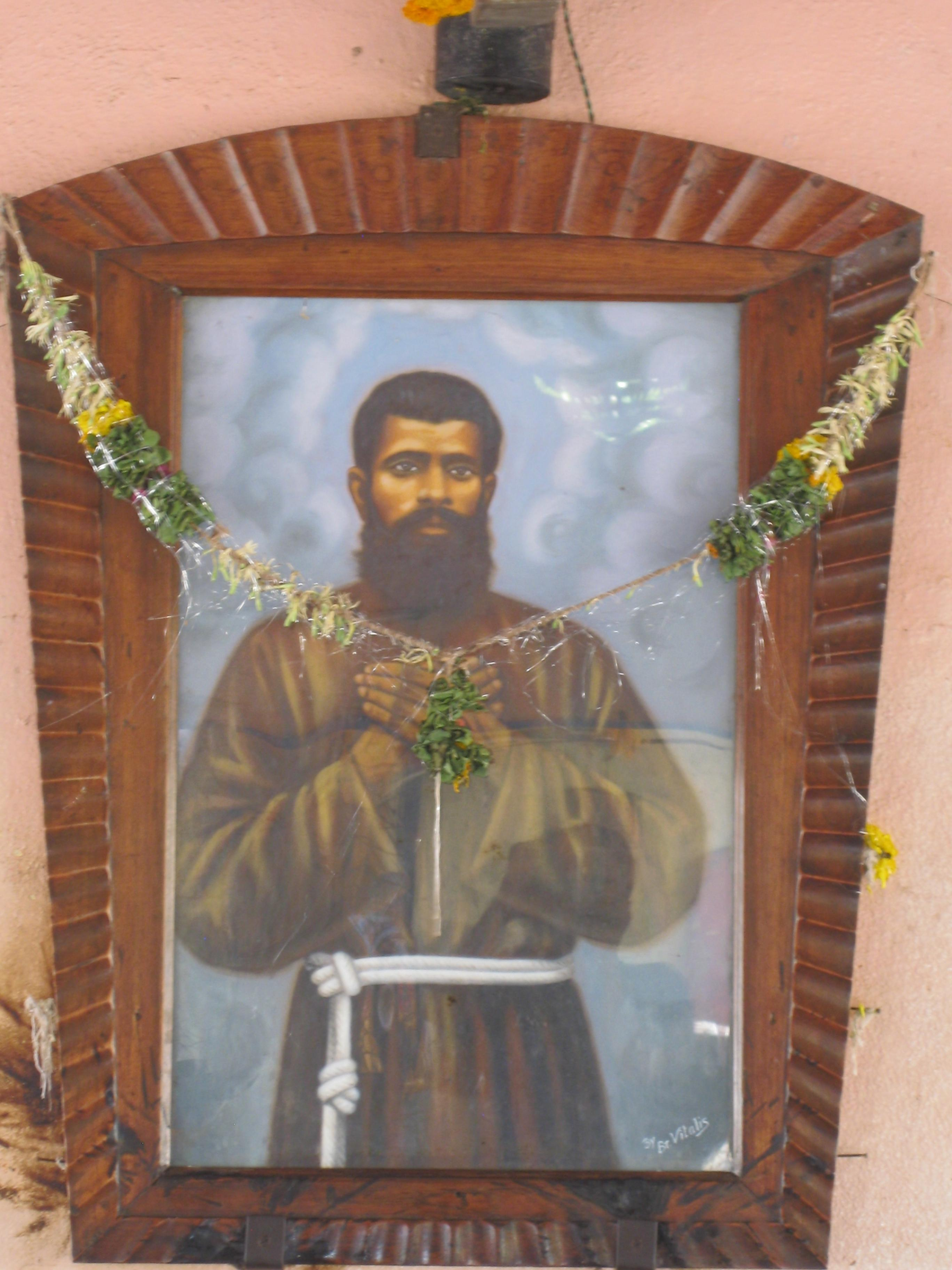
- Born: 11 November 1890; Saigon, Vietnam
- Died: 15 January 1945 (aged 54); Andhra Pradesh, India

Joseph Thamby (11 November 1890 – 15 January 1945) was a Roman Catholic religious brother of the Third Order of the Capuchins. He was declared Servant of God on 24 June 2007 by the Vatican. He is well known for his virtues, prayer and miracles in South India.

== Early life ==
Thamby was born to Savarimuthu Thamby and Annamalle on 11 November 1890 in Saigon, Vietnam, where his parents were employed at the time of his birth and the family returned to their native town Pondicherry, India, when he was two years old. His younger brother Michael Dariyan was born in India, when he was five years old. His mother died when he was seven years old and his father remarried.

== Missionary life ==
Because of suppression from his stepmother, Thamby left the house and joined the hermits. There he learnt about Francis of Assisi and started following his footsteps. He joined the Capuchins in 1924 at Sardhana, Uttar Pradesh, India. He left the Capuchins in 1933 but remained a member of the Third Order and hence wore the Third Order habit for the rest of his life. He promoted the Franciscan Third Order to everyone he met and so established the branches wherever he went. He spent his life as a travelling missionary and travelled throughout South India.

== Stigmata ==
He is also believed to have received the stigmata which had been witnessed by many priests and parishioners. As per the witnesses the blood used to ooze from his hands, feet and the side of the chest every Friday at 3 pm.

== Death ==
Thamby died on 15 January 1945 at 5 pm, the date of death and time he had already foretold. He was buried in the parish cemetery of Avutapally Parish, Andhra Pradesh, India.

== Canonization ==
Joseph Thamby was declared a Servant of God by the Vatican on 24 June 2007, thus starting the canonization process for him.

== See also ==
- List of saints of India
