= Eparchy of Gorakhpur =

Syro-Malabar Catholic territory in Uttar Pradesh, India

Location
- Country: India
- Ecclesiastical province: Archeparchy of Faridabad

Statistics
- Area: 19,070 km^{2} (7,360 sq mi)
- Population: Total; Catholics: (as of 2009); 17,200,635; 3,230 (0.0%)

Information
- Denomination: Catholic Church
- Sui iuris church: Syro-Malabar Catholic Church
- Rite: East Syriac Rite
- Established: 19 June 1984
- Cathedral: St. Joseph’s Cathedral in Gorakhpur
- Patron saint: Saint Thérèse of Lisieux; Saint Joseph

Current leadership
- Pope: Mar Leo XIV
- Major Archbishop: Mar Raphael Thattil
- Bishop: Mar Mathew Nellikunnel
- Metropolitan Archbishop: Mar Kuriakose Bharanikulangara
- Bishops emeritus: Thomas Thuruthimattam

Map
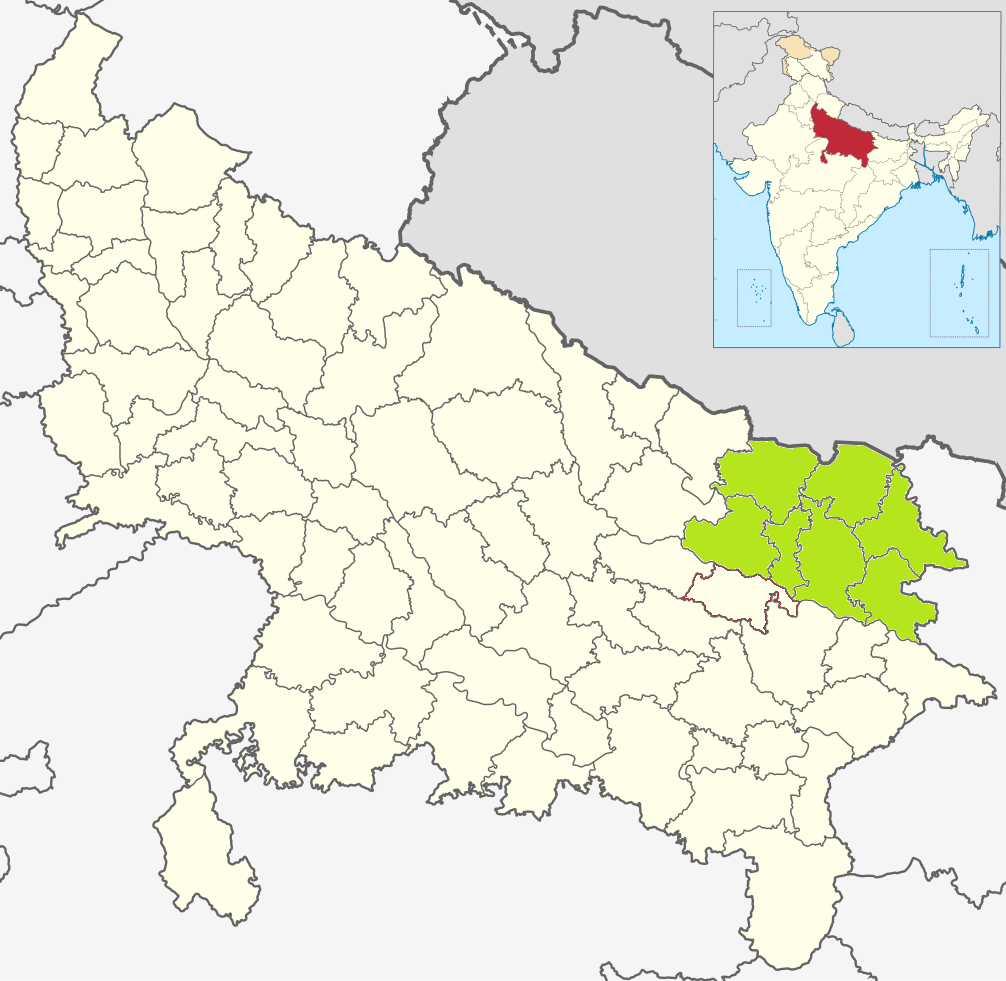

Website
- Catholic Diocese of Gorakhpur

The Eparchy of Gorakhpur is an Eastern Catholic eparchy in India, belonging to the Syro-Malabar Catholic Church. The eparchy was erected by Pope John Paul II in 1984 through the Bull "Ex quo Divinum Concilium". Mar Thomas Thuruthimattam was appointed bishop of Gorakhpur on 15 July 2006. He received his episcopal consecration on 1 October 2006 and assumed office on the same day.

== Leadership ==
=== Eparchs of Gorakhpur ===
- Eparch Dominic Kokkat, C.S.T. (19 June 1984 – 15 July 2006), retired
- Eparch Thomas Thuruthimattam, C.S.T. (15 July 2006 – 26 August 2023), retired
- Eparch Mathew Nellikunnel, C.S.T. (26 August 2023 – Present)
