= Pedro Landeta Azcueta =

Spanish missionary (1887–1963)

Venerable Aureliano of the Blessed Sacrament OCD
- Born: Pedro Landeta Azcueta; 27 June 1887; Basauri, Spain
- Died: 16 November 1963 (aged 76); Ernakulam, Kerala, India

Pedro Landeta Azcueta, also known as Aureliano of the Blessed Sacrament, was a religious priest of the Discalced Carmelites.

== Life ==
Azcueta was born on 27 June 1887 in Artunduaga de Basauri, Spain. He joined the novitiate of the Teresian Carmel of Larrea on 21 April 1900 and took the name Aureliano on 5 August 1903. He was ordained a priest on 10 December 1910 in the cathedral of Pamplona and sent to India as a missionary in 1913. On 5 October 1912, he along with two more companions landed in Bombay. He reached Ernákulam on 9 October 1912 in a motorboat. He worked in Malabar, India.

In India, Azcueta directed and encouraged the young seminarians for many years. He was national director of the Eucharistic League from 1928 to 1945. He organized National Eucharistic Congresses in India in 1931 and 1937, and helped foster daily and noctural eucharistic adoration in India, Burma and Ceylon. In 1933 he published a schedule of 868 churches in which adoration continued 24 hours a day.

He died in Ernakulam, India on 16 November 1963. Pedro was declared venerable on 26 March 1999 by Pope John Paul II.

== Works ==
- The mirror of priests : or a series of questions for the examination of conscience on ascetic life and pastoral duties to which is added A little treasury of selected prayers
- Cursus asceticus
- Manuale cursus vitae spiritualis
- The Holy Eucharist : sermons reprinted from "The Eucharist and Priest"
- Manuale Cursus Ascetici : Complectans Tres Vias Vitae Spiritualis Purgativam, Illuminativam et Unitivam
- The Divine Consoler

== See also ==
List of saints of India
