= Gratian Mundadan =

Indian Syro-Malabar Catholic bishop (born 1933)

Mar Gratian Mundadan CMI
- Bishop Emeritus of Eparchy of Bijnor
- Church: Syro-Malabar Catholic Church
- Diocese: Eparchy of Bijnor
- Appointed: 26 February 1977
- Term ended: 14 August 2009
- Predecessor: See established
- Successor: John Vadakel
- Previous post: Apostolic Exarch of Bijnor (1972–1977)

Orders
- Ordination: 17 May 1964
- Consecration: 6 November 1977 by Joseph Parecattil

Personal details
- Born: 15 May 1933 (age 93) Puthenpally, Alangad, Ernakulam district, Kerala, British Raj

Mar Gratian Mundadan, CMI (born 15 May 1933) is an Indian Syro-Malabar Catholic hierarch, who served as the first bishop of the Eparchy of Bijnor from 1977 to 2009. He previously served as the Apostolic Exarch of Bijnor from 1972 until the jurisdiction was elevated to a diocese in 1977.

== Early life and education ==
Gratian Mundadan was born on 15 May 1933 in Puthenpally, Alangad, in present-day Ernakulam district of Kerala, India. He joined the Carmelites of Mary Immaculate (CMI), a religious congregation of the Syro-Malabar Church, and was professed on 16 May 1958.

He was ordained a priest on 17 May 1964. Before becoming a bishop, he served in pastoral ministry and in education, including as a lecturer in mathematics at Sacred Heart College, Thevara.

== Episcopal ministry ==
On 23 March 1972, Mundadan was appointed the first Apostolic Exarch of Bijnor, a missionary jurisdiction of the Syro-Malabar Church in northern India.

When the Apostolic Exarchate was elevated to the Eparchy of Bijnor on 26 February 1977, he was appointed its first bishop. He was consecrated a bishop on 6 November 1977; the principal consecrator was Joseph Parecattil, Archbishop of Ernakulam.

He served as bishop of Bijnor for more than three decades and oversaw the development of the young mission diocese.

His resignation was accepted on 14 August 2009. He was succeeded by John Vadakel.
