= Mathew Nellikunnel =

Syro-Malabar bishop

Mar Mathew Nellikunnel
- Eparch of Gorakhpur
- Church: Syro-Malabar Catholic Church
- Diocese: Syro-Malabar Catholic Eparchy of Gorakhpur
- Appointed: August 26, 2023
- Installed: November 5, 2023
- Predecessor: Thomas Thuruthimattam

Orders
- Ordination: December 30, 1998 by George Punnakottil
- Consecration: November 5, 2023 by George Alencherry, Raphy Manjaly, and Thomas Thuruthimattam

Personal details
- Born: Mathew Nellikunnel; November 13, 1970 (age 55) Mariapuram, Kerala, India

Mar Mathew Nellikunnel is an Indian-born bishop of the Syro-Malabar Catholic Church serving as the Eparch of the Syro-Malabar Catholic Eparchy of Gorakhpur succeeding Mar Thomas Thuruthimattam.

== Biography ==
=== Early life ===
Mathew Nellikunnel was born on November 13, 1970, in the village of Mariapuram in the Indian state of Kerala as the first born of Varkey and Mary Nellikunnel. His brother John is the Bishop of Eparchy of Idukki, making history as the first set of brothers to serve together in the Synod of Bishops.

=== Eparch ===
On August 26, 2023, Pope Francis announced his assent to the Election of Msgr Matthew Nellikunnel to the office of Bishop of Goakhpur by the Syro Malabar Synod of Bishops to succeed the retiring Mar Thomas Thuruthimattam He was ordained on November 5, 2023, at St. Joseph's School, Khorabar, Gorakhpur, in the state of Uttar Pradesh, by Major Archbishop of the Syro Malabar George Alencherry, in the presence of Agra Bishop Raphy Manjaly and Gorakhpur Emeritus Bishop Mar Thomas Thuruthimattam.
