= Mynatharuvi Kolakase =

- Directed by: Kunchacko
- Written by: M. C. Appan
- Produced by: M. Kunchacko
- Starring: Sathyan; Sheela; Adoor Bhasi; Hari
- Music by: V. Dakshinamoorthy
- Production company: Udaya Pictures
- Distributed by: Udaya
- Release date: 2 June 1967
- Country: India
- Language: Malayalam

Mynatharuvi Kolakase is a 1967 Indian Malayalam-language film, directed and produced by Kunchacko. The film stars Sathyan, Sheela, Adoor Bhasi and Hari. The film had musical score by V. Dakshinamoorthy.

The film was based on the 1966 Madatharuvi murder of a widow named Mariyakutty in Kerala. A priest, Fr. Benedict Onamkulam, was wrongly convicted of the crime. Another film, Madatharuvi, based on the same theme was released in 1967. It was directed and produced by P. A. Thomas under the banner of Thomas Pictures. The film had actors like Sukumari, Adoor Bhasi, Thikkurissy Sukumaran Nair and Musthafa.

== Cast ==
- Sathyan
- Sheela
- Adoor Bhasi
- Hari
- Manavalan Joseph
- Jijo
- Adoor Pankajam
- Alummoodan
- Kaduvakulam Antony
- Kottarakkara Sreedharan Nair
- N. Govindankutty
- Nellikode Bhaskaran
- Pankajavalli
- S. P. Pillai
- Sunny

== Soundtrack ==
The music was composed by V. Dakshinamoorthy and the lyrics were written by Vayalar Ramavarma.

| No. | Song | Singers | Lyrics | Length (m:ss) |
|---|---|---|---|---|
| 1 | "Appanaane Ammayaane" | Kamukara | Vayalar Ramavarma | |
| 2 | "Pallaathuruthi" | K. J. Yesudas | Vayalar Ramavarma | |
| 3 | "Poy Varaam" | P. Susheela | Vayalar Ramavarma | |
