= Zeno de Beauge =

French missionary (1603–1687)

The First Capuchin Missionary in India
- Born: 1603; Angers, France
- Died: 21 January 1687 (aged 84); Fort St. George, India

Zeno de Beauge (Zénon de Beaugé: 1603 – 21 January 1687) was a French Capuchin missionary, who spent his later life in India.

== Missionary career ==
Zeno de Beauge was born in 1603 in Angers in the region of Pays de la Loire, France. He was first sent as missionary to the Middle East countries in 1637. When the Propaganda Fide was created in 1622, Pope Urban VIII asked the newly ordained first Indian Bishop Matheus de Castro to take the French Capuchin missionaries from Syria to Indian Missions. Three French Capuchin missionaries from Alep, the French Capuchin custody headed by Zeno de Beaugé, traveled with Matheus de Castro and reached Goa on 26 December 1639. The Padroado clergy of Goa opposed the Propaganda missionaries in India, so Zeno de Beaugé proceeded to Surat and founded the first Capuchin Mission in India under the protection of the English in 1639. When Father Ephrem de Nevers was arrested by the Portuguese Inquisition in 1649, he went to Madras Capuchin mission to take steps for his release. Zeno remained there with him as his companion during the development of the first Christian Mission in Madras. He died at the age of 84, on 21 January 1687 and was buried at St. Andrew, Fort St. George, the first church of Madras.
