= Muhammad ibn Rushayd =

Moroccan judge, writer and scholar of Hadith

Personal life
- Born: Muhibb al-Din Abu Abdallah Muhammad ibn Umar ibn Rushayd al-Fihri al-Sabti; 1259 Sabta, Morocco (present-day Ceuta, Spain)
- Died: February 22, 1321 (aged 61–62) Fez, Morocco
- Occupation: Judge, Writer, Scholar of Hadith

Religious life
- Religion: Islam

Muhibb al-Din Abu Abdallah Muhammad ibn Umar ibn Rushayd al-Fihri al-Sabti (1259–1321,Arabic: محب الدين أبو عبد الله محمد بن عمر بن رشيد الفهري السبتي) was a Moroccan judge, writer and scholar of Hadith, born in Sabta, Morocco (present-day Ceuta, Spain). In 1284 he travelled east for three years to perform the hajj and study. During his travels he became friends with the future vizier of Granada Ibn al-Hakim al-Rundi. By Ibn al-Hakim's invitation, he came to Granada in 1292 or 1293 and was appointed as an imam and then a judge. After the vizier's assassination in 1309, he returned to Morocco where he became imam in Marrakesh, and then a close advisor to the Marinid Sultan Abu Sa'id Uthman II. He died in February 1321 in Fez. He was well respected both during his life and in historical accounts, and left his writings on various topic, including on hadith, literature, and an account of his travel (rihla).

== Life ==
Muhammad ibn Rushayd was born in 1259 in Ceuta (Arabic: Sabta, hence his nisba al-Sabti), and during youth he studied hadith (the prophet's tradition) and Arabic grammar. In 1284 he travelled east to the rest of the Islamic world in order to perform the hajj (pilgrimage) and study. He embarked at Almería in the Emirate of Granada where he met the poet Ibn al-Hakim al-Rundi, a man from Ronda who was around his age and travelling east for the same reason. They became friends and together visited Mecca, Medina, Damascus, Cairo, and major cities in North Africa, and studied under prominent teachers. His friend returned to Ronda in 1286 while he continued his journey for one more year.

After his travels, he returned to Ceuta until 1292 or 1293 when he was invited by Ibn al-Hakim—then a minister at court—to come to Granada. There he became the imam and khatib of the city's great mosque, and there he gave commentaries on two hadiths from Sahih al-Bukhari every day. He then was appointed as a judge with the title qadi al-manakih. In 14 March 1309, a coup d'état in Granada deposed Sultan Muhammad III and Ibn al-Hakim—then a powerful vizier—was assassinated.

After the loss of his patron in Granada, he returned to Morocco. The Marinid Sultan Abu Sa'id Uthman II (r. 1310–1331) appointed him as the imam of Marrakesh's old mosque. He was also a jurist in the Maliki school. He appeared to be well-respected in North Africa and towards the end of his life he was a close advisor to the sultan. He died at Fez on 22 February 1321 (23 Muharram 721 AH).

== Works ==
Historian Al-Maqqari lists about ten titles by Ibn Rushayd, including the topics of hadith, mathematics, Arabic language, and literature. Ibn Rushayd also left an account of his journey (rihla), titled Mal al-'ayba fi ma jumi'a bi-tul al-ghayba fi al-rihla ila Makka wa Tayba which included various biographical information on scholars, excerpts of poems, while not very rich in geographical description. He also wrote collections of biographies of the fuqaha (jurists) of Al-Andalus, as well as of the collectors of hadiths Al-Bukhari and Muslim. According to historian Rachel Arié, historical sources "are unanimous in praising the extent of his learning," especially his expertise on hadith, his oratory skills, as well as his modesty and austerity.

== Sources ==
- Arié, Rachel (1971). "Ibn Rushayd". In Lewis, B.; Ménage, V. L.; Pellat, Ch. & Schacht, J. (eds.). The Encyclopaedia of Islam, Second Edition. Volume III: H–Iram. Leiden: E. J. Brill. p. 900. OCLC 495469525.
- Rubiera Mata, María Jesús (1969). "El Du l-Wizaratayn Ibn al-Hakim de Ronda" (PDF). Al-Andalus (in Spanish). 34. Madrid and Granada: Spanish National Research Council: 105–121.
