= Madatharuvi case =

1966 murder in Kerala, India

Madatharuvi case refers to 1966 murder of a widow named Mariyakutty, in Kerala, India. A priest, Fr. Benedict Onamkulam, was convicted of the crime. A sessions court sentenced the priest to death but the Church approached the high court and freed him. His supporters claim that he knew the culprit, but he didn't break the seal of confession.

== Prosecution ==
The prosecution alleged that the Syro-Malabar Catholic priest Fr. Benedict Onamkulam had killed Mariyakutty at the stream of Madatharuvi, near Ranni with the motive of ending their affair. Onamkulam was sentenced to death by the sessions court, however, the High court of Kerala acquitted and freed him purely based on technical grounds dismissing circumstantial evidence in 1967.

The case has been so sensational in Kerala that it inspired a number films. It came into prominence in local media again in 2010 when the Changanassery Bishop opened Fr. Benidict's tomb for prayers at Athirampuzha.

== Films ==
- Mynatharuvi Kolakase (1967)
- Madatharuvi (1967)
