= Francis Xavier Kroot =

Servant Of God Francis Xavier Kroot M.H.M.

Monsignor
- Born: 7 December 1854; Zwolle, Holland
- Died: January 5, 1900 (aged 45); Hyeres, France
- Venerated in: Roman Catholicism
- Beatified: 25 July 2017

Francis Xavier Kroot, was a missionary priest of the Saint Joseph's Missionary Society of Mill Hill and founder of the congregation of the Sisters of Our Lady of Fatima. He was declared Servant of God on 25 July 2017.

== Early life ==
Francis was born to Henry Kroot and Joanne Schrauwerson on 7 December 1854 at Zwolle, Holland. He attended a Catholic boarding school at Roermond, Holland, where he studied music, and calligraphy and mastered French, German and Italian.

== Priesthood ==
Francis studied at the minor seminary at Culemborg and completed his philosophy and theology from St. Josephs Seminary, Mill Hill London. He was ordained a priest on 8 June 1878 by Herbert Vaughan.

== Missionary and founder ==
On 8 August 1878, Francis was sent to Madras, India as a missionary priest where he served as Seminary Rector at Nellore. In 1897 he served as the Army Chaplain of Fort St. George, Madras, and also an Editor of Catholic Watchman magazine. He founded the congregation of the Sisters of Our Lady of Fatima on 8 February 1893 at Bellary, Karnataka.

== Death ==
Due to health issues, Francis, had to return to Europe for treatment. He died at the St. Mary of the Angels' Hospital, at Hyeres, France on 5 January 1900. His mortal remains were brought back to Pune, India and interred at Fatima Sisters Generalate chapel in June 1988.

== Canonisation ==
Francis was declared Servant of God on 25 July 2017.
