= Eparchy of Idukki =

Eastern Catholic eparchy in Keralam, India

Syro-Malabar Eparchy of Idukki

Location
- Country: India
- Metropolitan: Ernakulam–Angamaly

Statistics
- Area: 3,000 km^{2} (1,200 sq mi)
- Population: Total; Catholics: (as of 2009); 760,350; 261,750 (34%)
- Parishes: 151

Information
- Denomination: Catholic Church
- Sui iuris church: Syro-Malabar Catholic Church
- Rite: East Syriac Rite
- Established: 15 January 2003
- Cathedral: Cathedral of Mar Geevarghese Sahda in VazhathoppeIdukki
- Patron saint: Mar Sleeva

Current leadership
- Pope: Leo XIV
- Major Archbishop: Raphael Thattil
- Bishop: John Nellikkunnel

Website
- Website of the Diocese

The Eparchy of Idukki is an eparchy of the Syro-Malabar Catholic Church in southern India. It belongs to the ecclesiastical province of Eranakulam-Angamaly. Its cathedral church is Saint George's Cathedral Vazhathoppe, Idukki township, Keralam. This eparchy was formed by breaking the territory of Eparchy of Kothamangalam into Highrange & Lowrange areas.

== History ==
The creation of the diocese on 15 January 2003, as the twenty-sixth eparchy of the Syro-Malabar Catholic Church, on territory split off from the Diocese of Kothamangalam is contained in an Apostolic Constitution Maturescens Catholica fides, put forth by Pope John Paul II in December 2002. It started with 114 parishes and mission stations.

== Statistics ==
As of 2015, it pastorally served 266,600 Syro-Malabar Catholics (34.0% of 785,000 total; there are also Latin Catholics and Syro-Malankara Catholics in this region, belonging to the Diocese of Vijayapuram viz. Thiruvalla, and Christians of Jacobite and Orthodox Churches besides various Protestant denominations) on 3,000 km^{2} in 155 parishes with 573 priests (238 diocesan, 335 religious), 1,306 lay religious (350 brothers, 956 sisters) and 86 seminarians.

== Prelates ==
Eparch's of Idukki

Sl.no	Name	Designation	Year of appointment	Last year of service
1	Mathew Anikuzhikattil	Bishop	2003	2018
2	John Nellikunnel	Bishop	2018	present

Prelates Hailing from the Eparchy

Sl.no	Name	Designation	Year of appointment	Last year of service
1	Joseph Arumachadath, MCBS	Bishop - Bhadravathi	2007	present
2	Joseph Lukose Thachaparambath, C.M.I	Bishop - Adilabad	2025	present
3	Mathew Nellikunnel, C.S.T	Bishop - Gorakhpur	2023	present
