= Fidelis Thaliath =

Indian nun, gynecologist and social reformer

Servant of God Fidelis Thaliath
- Church: Syro-Malabar Catholic Church

Personal details
- Born: 1929 Puthanpally, Cochin State present day Ernakulam District, Kerala, India
- Died: 17 January 2008 (aged 79) Delhi, India
- Occupation: religious sister; Gynecologist

Fidelis Thaliath (1929 – 2008), popularly known as "Doctoramma" ("Mother Doctor"), was an Indian religious sister, gynecologist and social reformer who worked among the destitute people in Delhi. She was declared Servant of God in 2021.

== Early years ==
Fidelis Thaliath was born as Kochuthresia in 1929 in Puthanpally, a village in the then Cochin State, now part of the south Indian state of Kerala to Joseph Thaliath and Mariamkkutty. She joined the religious congregation, Sisters of the Destitute in 1952 and took the perpetual vow of chastity in 1956. In 1964, she moved to Chicago where she joined the Loyola University to obtain a medical degree in Gynecology. Subsequently, she returned to India to start her career as a medical professional in Holy Angels' Nursing Home in Delhi but returned to Chicago in 1973 to complete her master's degree in 1977.

== Social career ==
Returning to India in 1977, she founded the Jivodya Hospital, which was built on a plot of land in Ashok Vihar in Delhi, bought with a gift of US$ 1000 she had received for purchasing a car (Note: Please see In Memorium section) and served there in the Department of Gynecology. During her time in Delhi, she was involved in several social activities, focusing on helping the destitute people and founded two centres, one to house the poor women in Vikaspuri and the other, a home for the handicapped children in Ghaziabad.

Thaliath died on January 17, 2008, at the age of 79. Loyola University Chicago, her alma mater, have since instituted a scholarship, Class Of 1960 Sister Fidelis Thaliath, MD, Medical Student Scholarship Fund, in her honor.

== Cause of beatification ==
Thaliath is reported to have performed several miracles which are being considered and verified by Syro-Malabar Catholic Church and her social and religious contributions were considered by the church while deciding upon initiation of her beatification process. She was declared Servant of God by the Syro-Malabar Catholic Church on 14 July 2021 in the archdiocese of Faridabad by the Archbishop Mar Kuriakose Bharanikulangara.
