= Mathew Anikuzhikattil =

Indian Catholic bishop (1942–2020)

Mar Mathew Anikuzhikattil
- First Bishop of the Syro-Malabar Catholic Eparchy of Idukki
- Church: Syro-Malabar Catholic Church
- Archdiocese: Major Archeparchy of Ernakulam-Angamaly
- Diocese: Eparchy of Idukki
- In office: 2003–2018
- Predecessor: Seat created
- Successor: Mar John Nellikunnel

Orders
- Ordination: 15 March 1971 by Mathew Pothanamuzhi
- Consecration: 2 March 2003 by Varkey Vithayathil Congregation of the Most Holy Redeemer
- Rank: Bishop

Personal details
- Born: 23 September 1942 Kunchithanny, India
- Died: 1 May 2020 (aged 77) Kolenchery, India

Mathew Anikuzhikattil (23 September 1942 – 1 May 2020) was a Syro-Malabar Catholic bishop who spearheaded anti Kasthurirangan and Gadgil commission protests. He served as bishop of the Syro-Malabar Catholic Eparchy of Idukki, India, from 2003 to 2018.

== Life ==
Anikuzhikattil was born in Kadaplamattom in Kottayam district, although he was raised in Kunchithanny in Idukki district. He was ordained as a priest on 15 March 1971 at his home parish of Holy Family church in Kunchithanny by Mathew Pothanamuzhi.

On 15 January 2003 Pope John Paul II announced the creation of the Syro-Malabar Catholic Eparchy of Idukki with Anikuzhikattil as the first bishop. On 2 March 2003 Anikuzhikattil was consecrated a bishop and the eparchy was inaugurated by Cardinal Varkey Vithayathil Congregation of the Most Holy Redeemer. As priest and bishop he also served as the chairman of the KCBC commission for family, laity and women, and was also the patron of the High Range Samrakshana Samithi (HRSS), a people's movement within the Catholic Church in India. He retired in 2018 after reaching the age of 75. On 1 May 2020 Anikuzhikattil died of age-related problems at the Malankara Orthodox Syrian Church Medical College Hospital, Kolenchery at 1:38 A.M.
