= Archeparchy of Faridabad =

Eastern Catholic Archeparchy in Haryana, India

Archeparchy of Faridabad ܐܪܟܝܕܝܘܩܝܐ ܕܦ݂ܪܝܕܒܕ

Location
- Country: India
- Territory: NCT of Delhi, States of Haryana, Punjab, Himachal Pradesh, and parts of Uttar Pradesh, UTs of Jammu & Kashmir, Ladakh, and Chandigarh.
- Coordinates: 28°38′35″N 77°11′21″E

Statistics
- Area: 950,000 km^{2} (370,000 sq mi)
- Population: (as of 2019); 164,934
- Parishes: 44 missions

Information
- Denomination: Catholic Church
- Sui iuris church: Syro-Malabar Church
- Rite: East Syriac Rite
- Established: March 6, 2012
- Cathedral: Kristuraja Cathedral, Faridabad
- Patron saint: Thomas the Apostle
- Secular priests: 118

Current leadership
- Pope: Leo XIV
- Major Archbishop: Mar Raphael Thattil
- Metropolitan Archbishop: Mar Kuriakose Bharanikulangara
- Suffragans: Eparchy of Bijnor; Eparchy of Gorakhpur
- Auxiliary Bishops: Mar Jose Puthenveettil

Website
- faridabaddiocese.in

The Archeparchy of Faridabad is an Archeparchy of the Syro-Malabar Catholic Church in Faridabad, a city in Haryana, India. Erected on 6 March 2012 by Pope Benedict XVI it serves around 150,000 Syro-Malabar Catholics in the North India. Its first and current eparch is Mar Kuriakose Bharanikulangara, with the personal title of archbishop. The eparch resides in Faridabad, where the Kristuraja Cathedral (Christ the King Cathedral) is located.

The eparchy has a size of 950,000 km^{2}, spreads over several jurisdictions of Latin Church Catholic dioceses and covers the National Capital Territory of Delhi, the States of Haryana, Punjab, Himachal Pradesh, the Union Territories of Jammu-Kashmir, Ladakh, Chandigarh, as well as the Districts of Gautam Buddha Nagar and Ghaziabad (part of the State of Uttar Pradesh).

== Ordinaries ==
Bishop's and Archbishop's

Sl.no	Ordinary	Designation	Year of appointment	Last year of service
1	Kuriakose Bharanikulangara	Bishop	2012	2025
1	Kuriakose Bharanikulangara	Archbishop	2025	present

Auxiliary bishop

Sl.no	Ordinary	Designation	Year of appointment	Last year of service
1	Jose Puthenveettil	Auxiliary bishop	2019	present

== Suffragans ==
- Eparchy of Bijnor
- Eparchy of Gorakhpur

== Causes for canonisation ==
- Servant of God Sr. Fidelis Thaliath, S.D.
