= Varappuzha =

Varappuzha Verapoly
- Suburb
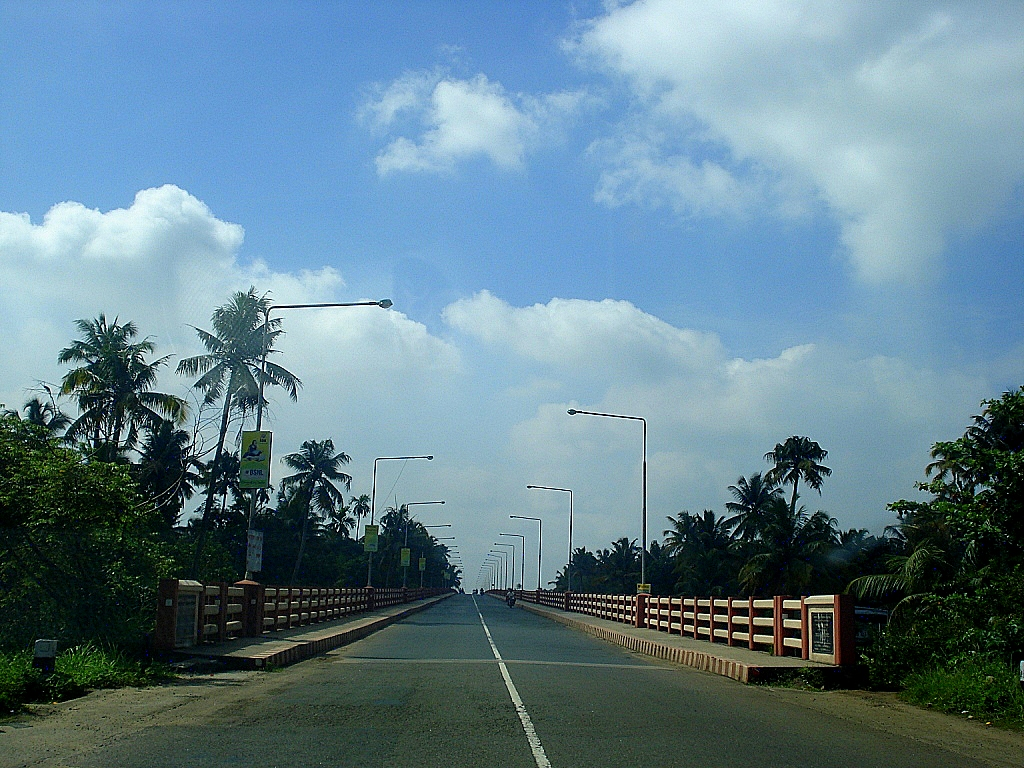
- Varapuzha Bridge
- Interactive map of Varappuzha
- Coordinates: 10°04′40″N 76°16′15″E
- Country: India
- State: Kerala
- District: Ernakulam
- Nearest City: Ernakulam

Area
  - Total: 7.74 km^{2} (2.99 sq mi)

Population (2001)
  - Total: 24,516
  - Density: 2,909/km^{2} (7,530/sq mi)

Languages
  - Official: Malayalam, English
- Time zone: UTC+5:30 (IST)
- PIN: 683517
- Vehicle registration: KL-42

Varappuzha, IPA: [ʋɐɾɐːpːuɻɐ], (formerly known as Verapoly) is a northern suburb of the city of Kochi. It is a census town in Paravur Taluk, Ernakulam district in the Indian state of Kerala. Situated around 15 km (9 mi) from the city centre and 8 km (5 mi) from Edapally, the areas lies in the NH 66 connecting Vytilla with North Paravur. Varappuzha has large-scale paddy cultivating area is situated at is western part which is called Devaswompadam, specialised with Pokkali paddy cultivation and interim crop as fish cultivation locally called 'Kettu'. The common work of the natives are fishing and agriculture. Varapuzha is known for its fish market (Chettibagam market).

The Varapuzha Bridge (near historical Verapoly Island) connects Varapuzha (Mannantturuthu) with the neighboring Cheranallur.

== Demographics ==
As of 2001 India census, Varappuzha had a population of 24,516. Males constitute 48% of the population and females 52%. Varappuzha has an average literacy rate of 84%, higher than the national average of 59.5%: male literacy is 85%, and female literacy is 83%. In Varappuzha, 11% of the population is under 6 years of age.

== Worship Centers ==
The majority of the population belongs to the Christian community. In Chirakkakom and Thevarkad, most of the people belong to the Hindu Kudumbi and Konkani communities.

Churches

- Mount Carmel & St. Joseph's Basilica; Catholic Latin Church, Varapuzha, ESTD - 1673 November (Former Cathedral of Archdiocese of Verapoly)-Varapuzha Church

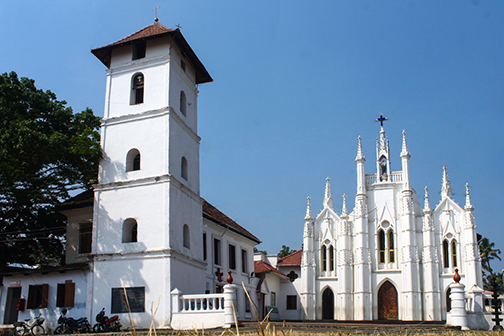
Varapuzha Basilica- RC

- St. George Syro-Malabar Catholic Church, (1788 - Constructed - 36 acres in Manampady)- Puthenpally
- St. Thomas Syro-Malabar Catholic Church, Varapuzha
- Infant Jesus Catholic Church, Thundathumkadavu
- St. Mary's Syro-Malabar Catholic Church, Thundathumkadavu
- St Anthony's Catholic Church, Chennur
- Christ The King Catholic Church, Christnagar, Chettibhagam
- Sacred Heart Catholic Church, Thevarkad
- St. Mary's Catholic Church, Muttinakam
- St. Sebastian Substation Church, Devaswampadam
- Assemblies of God Church, Koonammavu
- Church of God Full Gospel in India, Thevarkadu
- Varapuzha Brethren Church, Varapuzha

Temples

- Sree Mahadeva Temple, Thirumuppam
- Sree Kattil Bhagavathy Temple, Mannamthuruth
- Kuttikkattu Sree JayaDurga Temple
- Sree Varaha Swamy Temple, Varahapuram
- Devaswompadam Vanadurga Temple
- Vishnu Temple Chirakkakom
- Gurudeva Temple Mannamthuruth
- SreeNarayana Temple Thevarkad
- Murtuga Temple Thevarkad
- Sree Narayana Gurudeva Temple Thundathumkadavu

Masjid

- Muhayudeen Jumua Masjid Mannamthuruth

== See also ==
- Paravur Taluk
- Kadamakkudy Islands
- Ernakulam district
