= Ephrem de Nevers =

The First Christian Missionary of Madras
- Born: between 1607-1610; Auxerre, France
- Died: 13 October 1695 (aged between 84–85 and 87–88); Fort St. George, Chennai

Ephrem de Nevers (between 1607 and 1610 - 13 October 1695) was a native of Nevers, France. He was a Capuchin Franciscan priest and the first Christian missionary in Madras (Chennai), Tamil Nadu, India. De Nevers founded the first Christian mission in Madras on June 8, 1642, and was appointed the first Prefect Apostolic of Madras Capuchin Mission. Initially, it was known under the name the Apostolic Prefecture of Fort St. George. He served for 53 years as a missionary and died in Madras on October 13, 1695.

== Birth and mission in the Middle East ==
Father Ephrem de Nevers was born between 1607-1610 in Auxerre in the Region of Burgundy, France. He was baptized Etinne (Stephen) and his family Leclerc a native of Nevers. He became a Friar Minor Capuchin in the Capuchin province of Touraine and took the name of St. Ephrem. He was a well learned man and particularly in Science and Mathematics. He was first sent as missionary to the Middle East in 1636 and he served in various missions in Lebanon, Syria and Persia. His Superiors always entrusted him with the affairs to look for new foundations for the Capuchin province of Tours, thus he traveled to Sidon, Beirut, Damascus, Aleppo, Diyarbakir, Mosul, Baghdad, Isfahan and Basra. Father Ephrem de Nevers came to India in 1640 to report about the first Indian Capuchin mission in Surat and to take up new mission in Pegu, Burma. Because, in 1639, the French Capuchin Father Zeno de Beauge founded the first mission for the Propaganda Fide in India with a lot of opposition from the Padroado clergy.

== The Foundation of The First Christian Mission in Madras ==
Ephrem de Nevers came to Madras (Chennai) in 1642 to get a boat take him to Pegu. The English who founded the city of Madras in 1639, requested him earnestly to stay there for the spiritual benefits of the Portuguese Catholics. Since, Padroado diocese of Mylpaore was very close to this English settlement, Ephrem de Nevers refused to their appeal but seeing the spiritual desolation of the people accepted to found the first Christian mission in Madras, (This Capuchin mission of Madras was elevated to archdiocese of Madras in 1886 and later amalgamated into Mylapore diocese as Roman Catholic Archdiocese of Madras and Mylapore in 1952). Thus, he was credited to be the first Christian missionary of Madras, he built the first church of Madras dedicated to St. Andrew the apostle in Fort St. George and in the same year 1642, Pope Urban VIII raised this Capuchin mission into Prefecture apostolic and Father Ephrem de Nevers was appointed the first Prefect Apostolic of Madras. He was a man of great intellect and a linguist who was able to converse in French, English, Portuguese, Arabic, Persian and Tamil. He founded the first English school in India in his priestly residence.

== The Saint of Madras ==
The Padroado Portuguese system which resented to the missionary works of Propaganda Fide in India, arrested Ephrem in 1649, under the Portuguese Inquisition and imprisoned him for about two years in Goa. By the grace of Bijapur Sultan, Ephrem was released from the Portuguese Inquisition in 1652. Ephrem de Nevers returned to his mission of Madras and served with a great missionary spirit and brought many souls to the Christian faith. In an Anglican colony, Father Ephrem lade a strong foundation for a Catholic faith in spite of the oppositions from the Anglican clergy. He founded a new church dedicated to Our Lady of Angels for the local converts at Armenian street in 1658, (this Capuchin church of St. Mary's served as the cathedral of Madras archdiocese from 1886-1952, today, St.Mary's Co-Cathedral of Madras-Mylapore archdiocese and a famous shrine of St. Anthony of Padua). He was always acclaimed a holy and saintly priest and lover of all who possessed the real missionary spirit. Having served 53 years as missionary in Madras, Ephrem de Nevers increased his flock from 40 to 8000 and he died on 13 October 1695 and he was buried in the church of St. Andrew in Fort St. George. when the English demolished this first church of Madras in 1752, the tomb of the first Christian missionary disappeared from the soil of Madras.
