= Congregation of Saint Thérèse of Lisieux =

Religious brothers congregation

The Congregation of Saint Thérèse of Lisieux is the first religious brothers congregation founded in the Syro-Malabar Church in India and the first congregation in the name of St. Thérèse of Lisieux in India. The congregation also has a priestly wing.

It was founded on 19 March 1931 in a small village called Mookkannur by Augustine Kandathil. Later the Archbishop augmented the congregation with a priestly wing in 1945.

They are engaged in catechetical works, orphanages, schools, industrial training centres (ITC), hospitals, production centers, library, youth centres, prison ministry etc. Balanagar ITC, Mookkannur, is one of the most famous industrial training centres run by them.
