= James of Padua =

14th-century Franciscan missionary (died 1321)

James of Padua (died 1321) was a 14th-century Franciscan missionary who died in India.

James was in Persia in 1320 when he and a group of Franciscans left to travel through Asia on a missionary journey.

He was beheaded alongside Thomas of Tolentino and Demetrius of Tiflis at Thane, near Mumbai, on charges of blasphemy. The group was en route to evangelizing Sri Lanka and China. His fellow Franciscan Peter of Siena was executed three days later.

Their relics are held at the Church of St. John the Baptist.

They were beatified by Pope Leo XIII in 1894 as the Four Martyrs of Thane, with their memorial on 9 April.

== Sources ==
- "Blessed James of Padua". catholicsaints.info.
