= Demetrius of Tiflis =

14th-century Christian layman and martyr

Demetrius of Tiflis or Demetrio da Tifliz was a 14th-century Christian layman and martyr from Georgia or Armenia. He is venerated in the Roman Catholic Church as one of the Four Martyrs of Thane, on April 9.

== Life ==
In 1320, Demetrius left Hormuz with the Franciscans Peter of Siena, James of Padua and Thomas of Tolentino and the Dominican Jordan of Sévérac. - Demetrius was proficient at languages and served as the group's interpreter. A storm forced the party to land at Thane on the island of Salsette Island near Mumbai in India, en route and were greeted by local Nestorians. (Note: Another account exists which claims they had arrived at Diu intending to missionize at Columbum and had travelled to Thane on foot.) Jordan left them to preach at Bharuch, reaching Sopara (see Sopara in history) before he heard Demetrius and the Franciscans had been arrested. The family with whom they were staying had fallen into a quarrel and the husband had beaten his wife. When she went to the qadi to report this abuse, she had mentioned the four clerics as witnesses and they were called before him. Thomas, James, and Demetrius had gone to the court while Peter remained behind to look after their things. Having begun a discussion of religion, the qadi had asked them their opinion of Muhammad and Thomas replied bluntly that he was "the son of perdition and had his place in Hell with the Devil his father". At this, the Muslims around the court called for their death for blasphemy. Some accounts claim they were scourged and tortured before their execution by beheading on April 8, 1321. (Note: Some sources mistakenly list the date as April 9 or the year as 1322.) Peter was killed three days later.

== Bibliography ==
- Butler, Alban; et al., eds. (c. 1756), "Bd Thomas of Tolentino", Lives of the Fathers, Martyrs, and Other Principal Saints, A&C Black, p. 68, ISBN 9780860122531.
- Cunha, J. Gerson da (1876), Notes on the History and Antiquities of Chaul and Bassein, Bombay, ISBN 9788120608450.
- Habig, Marion Alphonse (1979), The Franciscan Book of Saints, Franciscan Herald Press, cited in "Thomas of Tolentino and Companions", Roman Catholic Saints.
- Carlo Vurachi, Demetrio di Tbilisi, martire a Tana (India), in Catholic Heritage in Georgia I, The Ist International Symposium (June 6–8, 2017), Tbilisi 2018.
- Carlo Vurachi, La memoria e il culto dei martiri francescani di Thane, in Il Santo, Padova LIX 2019, 1-2.
