= Peter of Siena (died 1321) =

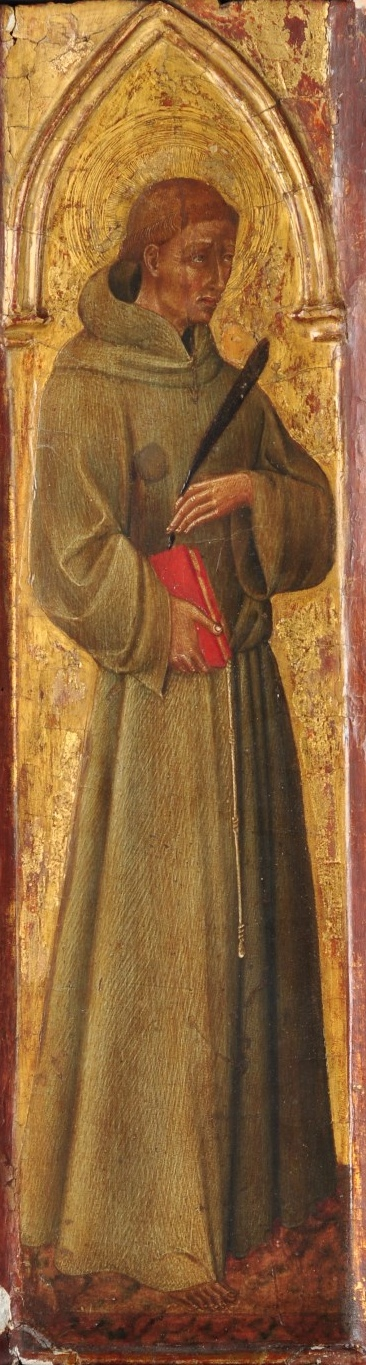
Giovanni di Paolo - Blessed Peter of Siena (Aartsbisschoppelijk Museum, Utrecht)

Peter of Siena (died 1321) was a 14th-century Franciscan missionary and martyr. He is reverenced in the Latin Church in India as one of the Four Martyrs of Thane, on April 9.

== Life ==
In 1320, Peter left Hormuz with his fellow Franciscans James of Padua and Thomas of Tolentino, the Dominican Jordan of Severac, and the layman Demetrio da Tifliz. A Georgian or Armenian, Demetrius was proficient at languages and served as the group's interpreter. A storm forced the party to land at Thane on Salsette Island near Mumbai in India en route, and they were greeted by local Nestorians. (Note: Another account exists which claims they had arrived at Diu intending to missionize at Columbum and had travelled to Thane on foot.) Jordan left them to preach at Bharuch, reaching Sopara (see Sopara in history) before he heard Demetrius and the Franciscans had been arrested. The family with whom they were staying had fallen into a quarrel and the husband had beaten his wife. When she went to the qadi to report this abuse, she had mentioned the four clerics as witnesses and they were called before him. Thomas, James, and Demetrius had gone to the court while Peter remained behind to look after their things. Having begun a discussion of religion, the qadi had asked them their opinion of Muhammad and Thomas replied bluntly that he was "the son of perdition and had his place in Hell with the Devil his father". At this, the Muslims around the court called for their death for blasphemy. Some accounts claim they were scourged and tortured before their execution by beheading on April 8, 1321. (Note: Some sources mistakenly list the date as April 9 or the year as 1322.) Peter was killed three days later.
