= Cheranallur =

- suburb
- Interactive map of Cheranallur
- Coordinates: 10°10′50.6″N 76°28′45.10″E
- Country: India
- State: Kerala
- District: Ernakulam
- Taluks: Kanayannur

Area
  - Total: 10.59 km^{2} (4.09 sq mi)

Population (2001)
  - Total: 26,330
  - Density: 2,485/km^{2} (6,440/sq mi)

Languages
  - Official: Malayalam, English
- Time zone: UTC+5:30 (IST)
- PIN: 682034
- Telephone code: 0484
- Vehicle registration: KL-07
- Sex ratio: 1014 ♂/♀
- Vidhan Sabha constituency: Ernakulam
- Website: cheranalloor.com

Cheranallur is a suburb of Kochi city in the state of Kerala, India and lies on the banks of the Periyar River. According to tradition, the area was named by its earlier inhabitants who found this place very fertile and beautiful. The name in the local language of Tamil means "Good Village of Cheras".

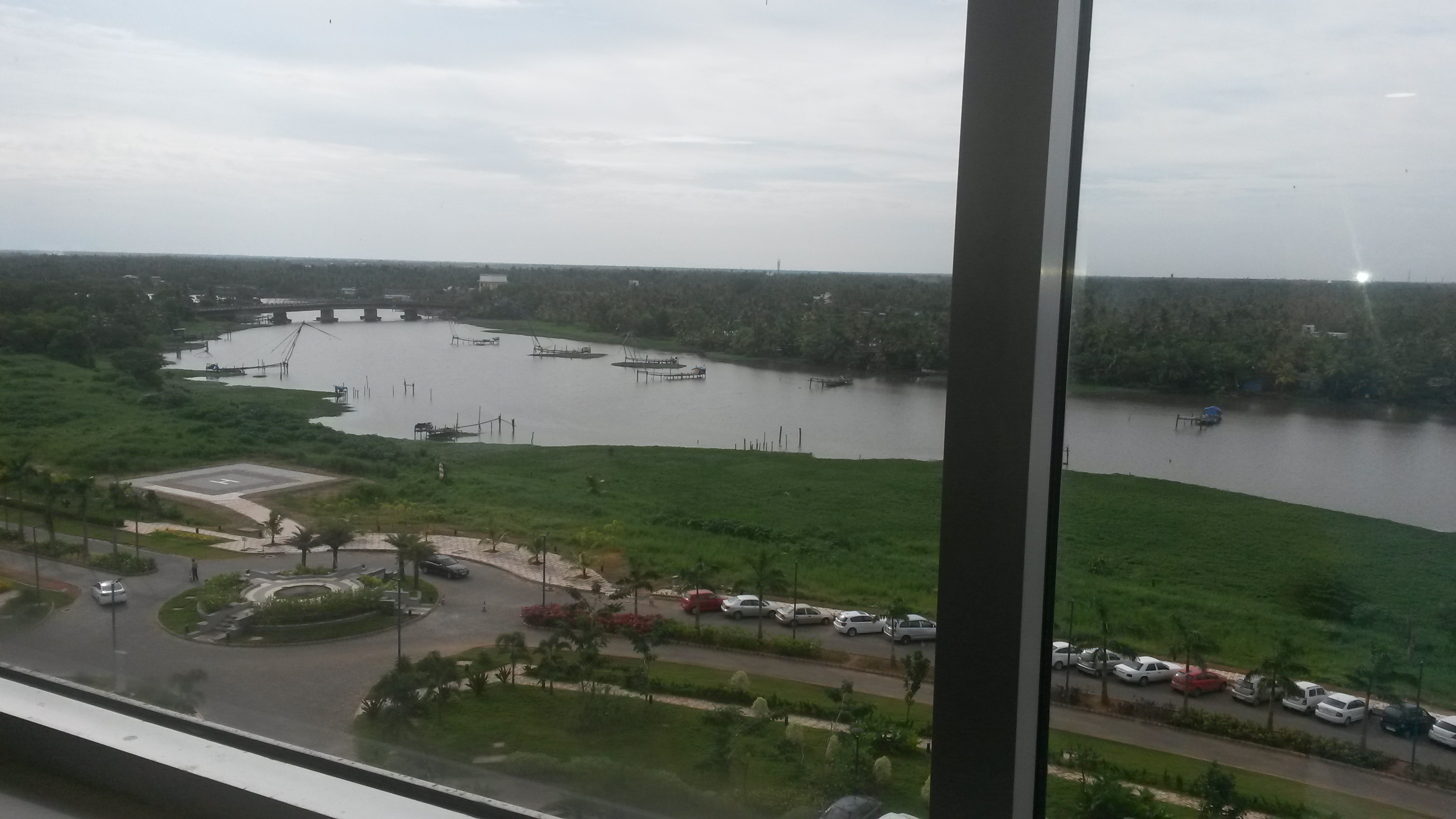
Cheranallur backwaters

The National Highway 66, which connects Cochin with Mumbai-Panvel, goes through Cheranalloor crossing the Vallarpadam International Container National Highway National Highway 47C (India) (the only junction between the two highways). Cheranallur is a place surrounded by backwaters, and brackish lagoons which are commonplace in Kerala. The former ruler of these area was known as "Cheranallor Karthavu" - he was one of the influential lords around Cochin area before the Sakthan Thampuran of Cochin. Cheranallur is the northern tip of the assembly constituency (which is the only Panchayath within the constituency), Ernakulam, now represented by T. J. Vinod.

== Location ==
The distance from Cheranallur to Cochin International Airport is 21 km (13.1 mi), and the distance to Edappaly Metro Station is 4.8 km (3 mi).

== Demographics ==
As of 2001 India census, Cheranallur had a population of 26,330. Males constitute 50% of the population and females 50%. Cheranallur has an average literacy rate of 85%, higher than the national average of 59.5%; with male literacy of 87% and female literacy of 84%. 11% of the population is under 6 years of age. Cheranallur used to be a very busy ferry in NH66 but the opening of the bridge called Varapuzha Bridge has negated the importance of the place. The only significant trade in the area is arecanut trading. The new National Highway to the vallarpadam container terminal from kalamassery passes through cheranellore cutting the NH66, forming the only junction in this highway, which is considered to become one of the biggest junction in the city. This makes cheranellore a hotspot as it connects Edappally, Kalamassery, Paravur and Ernakulam.. The cheranalloor ferry connects Eloor, Mannamthuruth and Cheranallur. All the three places are bus terminals. Cheranallur is connected to Ernakulam through Chittoor and Edappally and Palarivattom.It also has a gaming centre named blackout

== Notable people ==
- Pandit Karuppan
- V. V. K. Valath,
- Chakkiath Kochuvareed

== Hospitals ==
- The CIMAR Hospital (Fertility Hospital) owned by Edappal Hospitals Group is located at Thaikkavu, Cheranellore.
- Amrita Institute of Medical Science largest private hospital in kerala, also lies just near Cheranellore.
- Aster Medcity (Specialty hospital) is also located in cheranellore.
