= Francesco Convertini =

Venerable

Venerable Francesco Convertini SDB
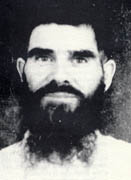
- Fr. Convertini circa 1935
- Born: 29 August 1898; Marinelli, Brindisi, Kingdom of Italy
- Died: 11 February 1976 (aged 77); Krishnagar, West Bengal, India

Francesco Convertini, SDB (29 August 1898 – 11 February 1976) was an Italian religious priest of the Salesians of Don Bosco. He served in the missions in India since arriving there in the mid-1920s and dedicated his apostolate to tending to children suffering from malnutrition and fostering interreligious dialogue and tolerance. He also dedicated himself to preserving the environmental protection of local communities in waste-ridden areas and travelled to various communities to bring forth the Gospel message to all people.

The process for Convertini's beatification was launched in the Krishnagar diocese in the late 1990s and he became titled as a Servant of God; he was titled as venerable in 2017 after Pope Francis confirmed that Convertini had practiced heroic virtue throughout his life.

== Life ==
Francesco Convertini was born in Marinelli near Cisternino in the Province of Brindisi on 29 August 1898 as the second of two children to a poor family: His parents were Sante Convertini (who died when he was three months old) and Caterina (who died when he was eleven). His mother provided for his religious upbringing in his childhood. He and his elder brother Samuele (who was thirteen when their mother died) were orphaned and sent to the friars to be paired with foster parents; the couple Vito and Anna Petruzzi from Fasano adopted them and treated the two as their own, so that the two would refer to them as "mother" and "father" due to the connection the four formed with each other. His brother emigrated to the United States of America around 1918.

He served in the Italian Armed Forces in World War I from January 1917, after being conscripted to the 124th Chieti Regiment. He served with on the frontlines in Trento from May 1917; on 23 December he was wounded and captured by the Austrian forces and held as a prisoner of war at a camp in Poland for the next eleven months. He was freed upon the war's conclusion but after returning to his homeland on 15 November 1918 suffered from severe meningitis therefore forcing him to recover in isolation in the hospital in Cuneo; his poor health made it worse since he looked skeletal upon his release. It was after he recovered that he decided to begin the next stage of his life and so decided to join the Guardia di Finanza around 1920. But at the same time he met a girl from his town that he fell in love with and with whom he planned to be married to. He followed his captain to Trieste and Pola before going to Turin where he attended confession in the Basilica of Our Lady Help of Christians; this event proved to change his life since he confessed to Father Angelo Amadei who became his spiritual director and put him in direct contact with the religious congregation known as the Salesians of Don Bosco. But this newfound call to enter the priesthood tore him since he was divided between accepting God's call and his love for his girlfriend. He settled on the priesthood and on 6 December 1923 commenced his ecclesial studies at the Salesian mission institute in Ivrea. He received his mission crucifix from the Rector Major Filippo Rinaldi himself.

He entered the Salesians of Don Bosco and was sent to India to serve in their missions there. Convertini left for India from the port in Genova on 7 December 1927 and arrived in Bombay on 26 December before taking a train to Calcutta. Convertini commenced his novitiate period in Shillong under the direction of the bishop Stefano Ferrando and was also a disciple of both Costantino Vendrame and Archbishop Louis Mathias (he passed his theological and philosophical studies despite some difficulties). He received his ordination to the priesthood on 29 June 1935 from Bishop Ferrando. It was not long before Convertini gained fame among the people for his unconditional and unbiased services to all people; he also mastered the Bengali language in order to better communicate with the people. Convertini would travel to various villages on bike or on foot or even on horseback with his backpack in order to go around evangelizing and aiding people (covering miles in order to visit far-reaching villages). He was also considered one of the few missionaries who could enter into Hindi or Muslim homes due to the strong rapport he fostered with people of other religions. This enabled him to create an air of interreligious dialogue and tolerance. His superiors forced him twice in 1952 and 1974 to return to his homeland to recover due to Convertini being known for his constant workload.

Convertini died in 1976 in Krishnagar and his remains were interred in the garden adjacent to the Krishnagar cathedral.

== Beatification process ==
The attention on Francesco Convertini was rekindled by the publication of a book by the Salesian Nicola Palmisano. The beatification process launched in the Diocese of Krishnagar on 12 December 1997 in a diocesan investigation that was later concluded there on 20 June 2005. The formal introduction to the cause came on 27 July 1998 after the Congregation for the Causes of Saints issued the nihil obstat ("no objections") decree and titling Convertini as a Servant of God. The Congregation later validated the diocesan process on 19 June 2006 after the cause was transferred to Rome while the department received the positio in 2009 for evaluation. Convertini became titled as venerable on 20 January 2017 after Pope Francis signed a decree that acknowledged that Convertini had led a life of heroic virtue. Thepostulator for the cause is Pierluigi Cameroni SDB.

== Books ==
- Lettere 1927-1976
- L'impasse
- Gli acrobati
