= Diocese of Nongstoin =

Roman Catholic diocese in Meghalaya, India

Coordinates: 25.5242°N 91.2691°E

Diocese of Nongstoin Dioecesis Nongstoinensis

Location
- Country: India
- Ecclesiastical province: Shillong
- Metropolitan: Shillong

Statistics
- Area: 5,247 km^{2} (2,026 sq mi)
- Population: Total; Catholics: (as of 2020); 581,216; 164,334 (28.3%)

Information
- Rite: Latin Rite
- Established: 28 January 2006
- Cathedral: Cathedral of St. Peter the Apostle in Nongstoin

Current leadership
- Pope: Leo XIV
- Bishop: Wilbert Marwein
- Metropolitan Archbishop: Victor Lyngdoh

Map
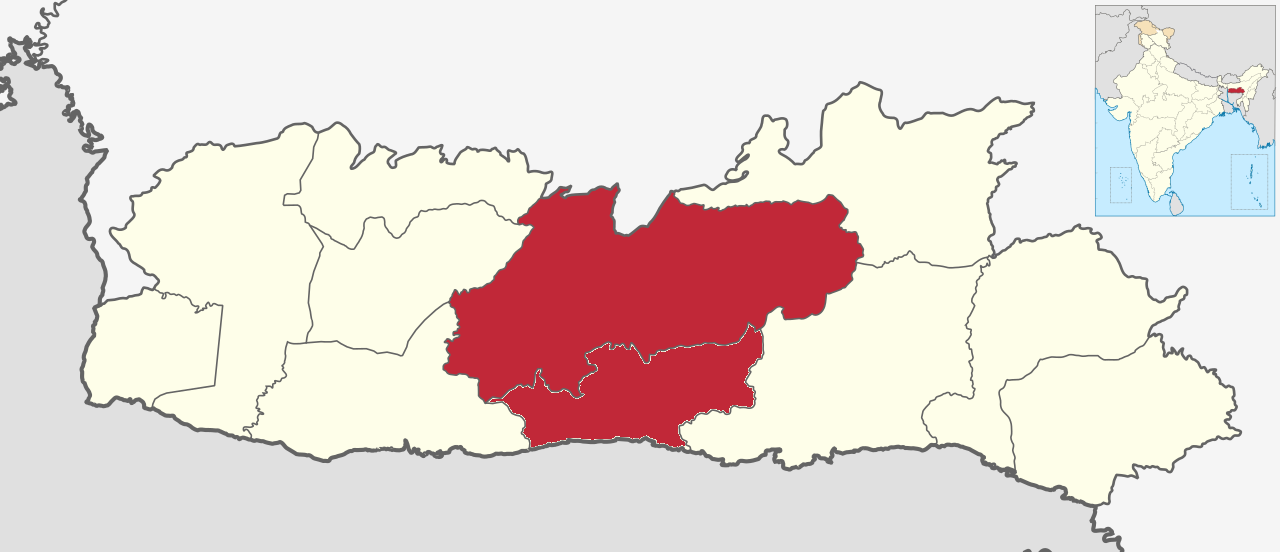

The Roman Catholic Diocese of Nongstoin (Latin: Nongstoinen(sis)) is a diocese comprising three districts of Meghalaya , namely West Khasi Hills , Eastern West Khasi Hills and South West Khasi Hills with the seat located in the town of Nongstoin at the Cathedral of St. Peter the Apostle . It falls under ecclesiastical province of Shillong in India with a land area of 5, 247 square kilometers.

== History ==
The real success and growth of the Catholic Church in West Khasi Hills is solely attributed to the zealous missionaries who dedicated and sacrificed their lives for the Gospel. Some of whom need special mention. The seed of Christianity fell in fertile soil sometimes in 1907, where under the capable supervision and direction of the saintly Father Otto Hopfenmuller SDS, Myntri Langduh Shangdiar and his son Raimondus Rai Khardewsaw found grace in the personal animation of Father Valentinus Karffe SDS and were baptized on 24 January 1907 at Rangthong by the Officiating pastor Father Dominicu Dounderer SDS. The seed blossomed and bear fruit. Raimondus Rai later became the first teacher and Catechist of Rangblang. Rangblang became the first stronghold of Catholicism in the Western zone of Khasi Hills.

The colossal contribution of spreading the Gospel of Christ in West Khasi Hills, which dominated the Catholic Arena, was none other than the beloved Father Constantine Vendrame SDB from 1922 onwards. His foot-steps were followed by his followers Father Tome, Foglia, C. Attard, Carmelo Spitale and later Fathers Felix Matta, Costa, Albizuri, Toniguzzo and Vanni Desideri and many others.

In the mid-20th century, the nearest Mission station was Marbisu Parish, 76 kilometers away from Nongstoin. The faithful, Catechists and devotees traveled on foot to fulfill their obligations to the Mission station bare-footed for four days forth and back. Father Carmel Attard SDB, the stern and fatherly Maltese missionary was there to receive them. Those were the days of trials but bear fruits that lasted till today.

From 1970 onwards, the sacrifice and untiring endeavour of the missionaries boosted the Mission filed in West Khasi Hills (at that time under Assam). The Shillong Diocese felt it necessary to extend the pastoral institutions to the western zone of the diocese. Thus the Parish of St. Peter the Apostle was established on 12 May 1966 at Pyndengrei, Nongstoiñ with Father Emmanuel Albizuri SDB as the first Parish Priest (RIP-Spaniard) and Father John Mary Premoli SDB (an Italian) now in Africa as assistant Parish Priest. These two "bulldozer missionaries" travelled far and wide on foot covering the present 10 parishes and make it possible for the present Diocese to come into existence.

The Diocese of Nongstoin was created by Pope Benedict XVI on 28 January 2006. The Apostolic Nuncio to India, Archbishop Pedro Lopez Quintana, ordained Bishop Victor Lyngdoh on 2 April 2006 and installed him as the first Bishop of Nongstoiñ Diocese on 4 April 2006 amidst turbulent torrential cyclonic rain The diocese was bifurcated from the Archdiocese of Shillong and it includes the whole area of the West Khasi Hills District , South West Khasi Hills district and Eastern West Khasi Hills district , Meghalaya

== Statistics ==
As of 2009, Nongstoin diocese had 102,900 baptized Catholics, representing 34 percent of all 313,723 people in the territory. The diocese had 18 parishes and 60 mission stations. During 2009, the diocese recorded 4,850 baptisms. According to the current statistics of 2012, the Catholic population is 1,21,231 approximately. In 2015 the Catholic population was 136,142.

== Leadership ==
- Bishops of Nongstoin (Latin Rite)
  - Bishop Victor Lyngdoh (28 January 2006 – 14 October 2016)
    - Bishop Victor Lyngdoh was born on 14 January 1956 in Wahlang, East Khasi Hills District in the state of Meghalaya. He was ordained a priest on 25 January 1987 in the Archdiocese of Shillong. He was appointed Bishop of Nongstoin on 28 January 2006 and was consecrated on 2 April 2006. Before becoming a prelate Bishop Lyngdoh was parish priest of the Cathedral of Mary Help of Christians in the Archdiocese of Shillong. He is the Chairman of Bible Commission in North East Bishops' Council of India. In 2016 , he was appointed to be the Bishop of Jowai Diocese and hence the seat or the cathedra of Diocese of Nongstoin became vacant for more than 6 years without a Bishop .
  - Bishop Wilbert Marwein ( April 16, 2023 - Present )
