= George Mamalassery =

Indian Roman Catholic bishop (1932–2024)

His Excellency George Mamalassery
- Bishop Emeritus of Tura
- Metropolis: Shillong
- Diocese: Tura
- Appointed: 12 January 1979
- Term ended: 21 April 2007
- Predecessor: First
- Successor: Andrew Raksam Marak

Orders
- Ordination: 23 April 1960
- Consecration: 19 March 1979 by Hubert D’Rosario

Personal details
- Born: 22 April 1932 Kalathoor, Travancore, India
- Died: 5 July 2024 (aged 92) Tura, Meghalaya, India

George Mamalassery (22 April 1932 – 5 July 2024) was an Indian clergyman and bishop for the Roman Catholic Diocese of Tura. He was ordained in 1960. He was appointed in 1979. He retired in 2007.

Mamalassery died due to respiratory failure at the Holy Cross Hospital, in Tura, Meghalaya, at the age of 92.

Catholic Church titles
Preceded by First	Bishop of Tura; 1979–2007	Succeeded by Andrew Raksam Marak
