= Laitumkhrah =

- City
- Location within Meghalaya Location within India
- Coordinates: 25.571°N 91.897°E
- Country: India
- State: Meghalaya
- District: East Khasi Hills

Languages
  - Official: Khasi, English
- Time zone: UTC+5:30 (IST)
- Postal code: 793003
- Vehicle registration: ML

Laitumkhrah (Khasi: lait meaning "free" and umkhrah which is the name of a river Umkhrah) is a census town in Shillong, Meghalaya, India. The name of the place basically means a place where the river "Umkhrah" originates from making its name aptly suited.

From Laitumkhrah there are three roads connecting Happy Valley (Them Basuk), Umpling & New Colony. The area is one of the costlier areas in Shillong but staying here itself is an experience. Laitumkhrah is filled with old historical buildings but with constant development in the area, most of the older buildings have been replaced with modern buildings. This place is relatively cold compared to other places of Shillong.

Laitumkhrah is the heart of Shillong. The area has a number of churches, schools and colleges. There's a market called Laitumkhrah Market (locally called 'Iew Shyllong') providing fresh vegetables, pork, beef, chicken and other stuffs. Nazerth Hospital, one of the oldest hospitals in Shillong, is located here.

Laitumkhrah houses the famous Ramakrishna Mission Shillong. The third generation sweet shop "Kalpatru" offering a wide variety of sweets is also located in Laitumkhrah.

Laitumkhrah is the center of education in Shillong with numerous well known educational institutions like St.Margaret's Higher Secondary School Shillong, Loreto Convent, St. Edmund's College, St. Anthony's College, Shillong, Saint Mary's College (Shillong), Don Bosco Technical School, Shillong and the National Institute of Technology Meghalaya all located within the boundary of Laitumkhrah.

Mary Help of Christians Cathedral, Shillong which serves as the seat of the Roman Catholic Archdiocese of Shillong is also located in Laitumkhrah. The church is the first Catholic cathedral church in what was then Assam.
