= Vincent Kympat =

- Bishop of Jowai
- Church: Catholic Church
- Diocese: Diocese of Jowai
- In office: 28 January 2006 – 30 July 2011
- Predecessor: Diocese erected
- Successor: Victor Lyngdoh

Orders
- Ordination: 23 January 1977
- Consecration: 2 April 2006 by Pedro López Quintana

Personal details
- Born: 17 December 1946 Tluh (east of Khliehriat), Assam Province, British Raj, British Empire
- Died: 30 July 2011 (aged 64)

Vincent Kympat (17 December 1946 – 30 July 2011) was the Roman Catholic bishop of the Roman Catholic Diocese of Jowai, India.

Ordained to the priesthood in 1977, Kympat became bishop of the Jowai Diocese in 2006.

== Biography ==
Kympat was from Tluh, a remote village in Jaintia Hills. He was born in 1946 and ordained as a priest in 1977. He completely his philosophy course from Christ King College, Shillong and Theology from Sacred Heart Theological College in Poonamallee, Tamil Nadu. After his graduating he specialised in Catechetic from the Salesianum in Rome.

Kympat was the chairman of the Small Christian Communities Commission in North Eastern Regional Bishops' Council of India. He was appointed Bishop of Jowai on 28 January 2006 and was ordained on 2 April 2006.

Kympat died on 30 July 2011.
