= Andrew Raksam Marak =

Roman Catholic bishop of Tura, India

Most Reverend Andrew Raksam Marak
- Bishop of Tura
- Archdiocese: Shillong
- Diocese: Tura
- Appointed: 21 April 2007
- Predecessor: George Mamalassery
- Successor: Incumbent

Orders
- Ordination: 10 February 1982
- Consecration: 3 October 2004 by Pedro López Quintana

Personal details
- Born: 5 February 1950 (age 76) Meghalaya India
- Denomination: Roman Catholic
- Motto: THE CROSS IS OUR SAVIOUR

Bishop Andrew Raksam Marak is the current serving Roman Catholic bishop of the Roman Catholic Diocese of Tura, India.

== Early life ==
Marak was born on 5 February 1950 in Chimagre, Meghalaya, India.

== Priesthood ==
On 10 February 1982, Marak was ordained to the priesthood.

== Episcopate ==
Marak was appointed Coadjutor Bishop of the Roman Catholic Diocese of Tura on 3 June 2004 and ordained a bishop on 3 October 2004 by Archbishop Pedro López Quintana.

He succeeded as bishop of the Roman Catholic Diocese of Tura on 21 April 2007.
