= Oreste Marengo =

Italian priest

Venerable Oreste Marengo SDB
- Titular Bishop of Arsacal
- Church: Roman Catholic Church
- Appointed: 26 June 1969
- Term ended: 30 July 1998
- Predecessor: Vincent Martin Leonard
- Successor: Sergio Alfredo Gualberti Calandrina
- Previous posts: Bishop of Dibrugarh (1951-64); Bishop of Tezpur (1964-69); Apostolic Administrator of Tura (1969-79)

Orders
- Ordination: 2 April 1932
- Consecration: 27 December 1951 by Maurilio Fossati

Personal details
- Born: Oreste Marengo; 29 August 1906 Diano d'Alba, Cuneo, Kingdom of Italy
- Died: 30 July 1998 (aged 91) Tura, Meghalaya, India
- Motto: To seek souls

Oreste Marengo (29 August 1906 - 30 July 1998) was an Italian Roman Catholic prelate and professed member from the Salesians of Don Bosco. He served as the Bishop of Diburugarh from 1951 until his transferral in 1964 to Tezpur where he served until 1969. From that point until 1979 he served as the apostolic administrator for the new Tura see. He was dedicated since his childhood to joining the missions and in his late adolescence was permitted to go to the missions in India. Marengo often trekked on foot to remote villages where he evangelized to the people and provided for their educational needs as best he could. He was reluctant to accept his episcopal nomination but did not cease his catechizing and evangelizing in his dioceses. His time spent in India saw him learn prior to his ordination under Stefano Ferrando and the Costantino Vendrame.

His reputation for holiness endured in his life and those around him praised him for his virtues and adherence to his order's spirit. Upon his death efforts were made to launch the canonization process; it opened a decade after his death and he became titled as a Servant of God upon the cause's commencement.

== Life ==
=== Education and priesthood ===
Oreste Marengo was born in Diano d'Alba in the Cuneo province on 29 August 1906 to Lorenzo della Cecche and Agostina Montaldo. His brother Giuseppe became a diocesan priest while his sister Maria Agnese entered the Thouret Sisters. His other two brothers were Cesare and Natale and his half-sister was Maria who married later in life. His mother had attended the 1888 funeral of Giovanni Bosco.

His parish priest Falletti served as an inspiration to him since he was part of the Salesians of Don Bosco whose spirit enthralled Marengo. His first teacher in school was the religious sister Caterina Zannone (b. 1871) and he was in grammar school from 1919 until 1923. Marengo studied in Turin. He also met the Rector Major Filippo Rinaldi in Valdocco who would be the one to send him to India.

Marengo began his novitiate in Foglizzo in 1923. In December 1923 he departed for Shillong where he continued his formation in Shillong in the school that Luigi Mathias managed. He finished his novitiate around 1924 under the novice master Stephen Ferrando and later studied in Assam for a philosophical course. He later in 1929 was sent to Shillong again for theological studies under Costantino Vendrame, whom Marengo referred to as both a "marvelous figure" and a "tireless worker" who embodied the Salesian spirit. Marengo was ordained to the priesthood on 2 April 1932 in Shillong and celebrated his first Mass in a remote village ten kilometers from Shillong in a mountainous area. Following this his first assignment was in Gauhati where he visited the scattered villages, for the most part on foot. He oversaw the establishment of a bamboo chapel in each village which was to have its own catechist in order to instruct others in the faith. He was later reassigned – to his displeasure at having to leave his work – to the mission in Dibrugarh, but after a brief period there was allowed to return to Gauhati after a Polish colleague took over for him. Marengo tended to those suffering from cholera in 1935 and 1936 epidemics. It was also in that time frame that Marengo managed the Don Bosco School in Gauhati.

Marengo's extensive labors soon wore him out after he grew weakened in his health. This prompted his superiors to send him a telegram inviting him to Calcutta where he learnt he had to leave his mission in order to teach Italian novices at a school; he did this for a decade. He was pleased to be able to resume his work in the missions after Italian novices could no longer be sent to India due to the outbreak of World War II.

=== Episcopate ===
In 1951 as he was preaching a course to religious sisters he learnt that Pope Pius XII had appointed him as a bishop. He attempted in vain to refuse the nomination, to his superiors in Rome and Turin, but failed after four months of constant insistence and repeated pleas; the Rector Major Pietro Ricaldone even wrote to him requesting that he accept the nomination in obedience. Marengon relented and in obedience accepted the episcopal nomination before he arrived in Turin on 7 December 1951. He then moved on to his hometown for about a week to meet his mother and brothers as well as several nephews. He received his episcopal consecration in the Turin Cathedral after Christmas on 27 December 1951 from the Cardinal Archbishop of Turin Maurilio Fossati. Bishop Carlo Stoppa and Bishop Carlo Angeleri served as the co-consecrators. His old teacher Caterina Zannone came from Naples to attend the consecration Mass.

He entered his new diocese in 1952 where he mastered and used the Lotha language in order to better communicate with the people living there. Sometime after this rising water from the Brahmaputra River caused danger with the erosion of the shore causing structural damage to surrounding buildings. The worried sisters believed the government would do little to help in the rebuilding and insisted that he correspond with the noted stigmatist Padre Pio to ask for his guidance. The Franciscan friar responded to Marengo instructing him and the sisters to "continue the work with zeal" and assured them that the government would help. The Prime Minister visited the area not long afterwards and rebuilding commenced. Marengo attended the first session of the Second Vatican Council in 1962 and attended the third and fourth sessions but missed the second.

In 1964 he was transferred to the Tezpur diocese where he remained until he was made the apostolic administrator for the new Tura diocese. It was at this point he suffered from periodic bouts of malaria in addition to a rather severe hernia, in addition to initial signs of phlebitis. He arrived there in 1972 to find refugee camps holding around nine million refugees. He remained in the new diocese until 1979 when a formal bishop had been appointed to head the see. In 1980 he moved to a Salesian institute in Mendal to live out his retirement. Marengo had in his career mastered more than 20 regional languages and was considered a pioneer in health care and education in his sees.

=== Illness and death ===
In 1998 he was hospitalized several times, the last time in Tura on 20 May where he remained for the rest of his life. During this time he lost both weight and appetite. During his time in hospital he visited the other sick by wheelchair, right up to his on 28 July. He also enjoyed listening to recorded tapes of the Gospel. Marengo died on 30 July at 2:10pm. His funeral was celebrated on 1 August with 3000 people crowding in to attend alongside 250 sisters and 150 priests. Most of the northeastern Indian bishops attended as did some bishops from abroad.

== Beatification process ==
The beatification process opened in Tura on 12 April 2007 to begin collecting documentation and witness testimonies in relation to Marengo's life and holiness. This process concluded its business on 16 February; during that time the Congregation for the Causes of Saints titled Marengo as a Servant of God and issued the nihil obstat ("nothing against") decree on 9 July 2007 to open the cause on an official level. The congregation validated the diocesan process in Rome on 6 December 2013. The postulator for the cause is the Salesian priest Pierluigi Cameroni and Joseph Puthenpurakal is the current vice-postulator.
