= Dominic Jala =

Indian prelate of the Catholic Church (1951–2019)

The Most Reverend Dominic Jala S.D.B.
- Emeritus Metropolitan Archbishop of Shillong
- Archdiocese: Roman Catholic Archdiocese of Shillong
- Appointed: 22 December 1999
- Installed: 2 April 2000
- Term ended: 10 October 2019
- Predecessor: Tarcisius Resto Phanrang
- Successor: Victor Lyngdoh
- Other post: Chairman of the Liturgy Commission of North eastern Bishops Conference
- Previous post: Provincial of the Salesian congregation in Guwahati

Orders
- Ordination: 19 November 1977
- Consecration: 2 April 2000 by Thomas Menamparampil

Personal details
- Born: 12 July 1951 Mawlai, Meghalaya, India
- Died: 10 October 2019 (aged 68) Colusa County, California, U.S.
- Motto: To grow in the unity of the Holy Spirit

Archbishop Dominic Jala, S.D.B. (12 July 1951 – 10 October 2019) was the Metropolitan Archbishop of the Roman Catholic Archdiocese of Shillong and the Apostolic Administrator of the Roman Catholic Diocese of Nongstoin, India.

== Early life ==
Jala was born on 12 July 1951 in Mawlai, Meghalaya, India.

== Priesthood ==
Jala was ordained a Catholic Priest for the Salesians of Saint John Bosco congregation on 19 November 1977.

== Episcopate ==
Jala was appointed Metropolitan Archbishop of the Roman Catholic Archdiocese of Shillong, India on 22 December 1999 and ordained a Bishop on 2 April 2000. He was appointed Apostolic Administrator of the Roman Catholic Diocese of Nongstoin, India on 15 October 2016.

== Death ==
Archbishop Jala died in an automobile accident, on 10 October 2019, in Colusa County, California, U.S.

== Writings ==
- Liturgy and mission

Catholic Church titles
Preceded by Tarcisius Resto Phanrang S.D.B.	Metropolitan Archbishop of Shillong; 1999–2019	Succeeded by Victor Lyngdoh
