= St. Edmund's College, Shillong =

School in Shillong, India

Coordinates: 25.5677°N 91.8968°E

St. Edmund's College
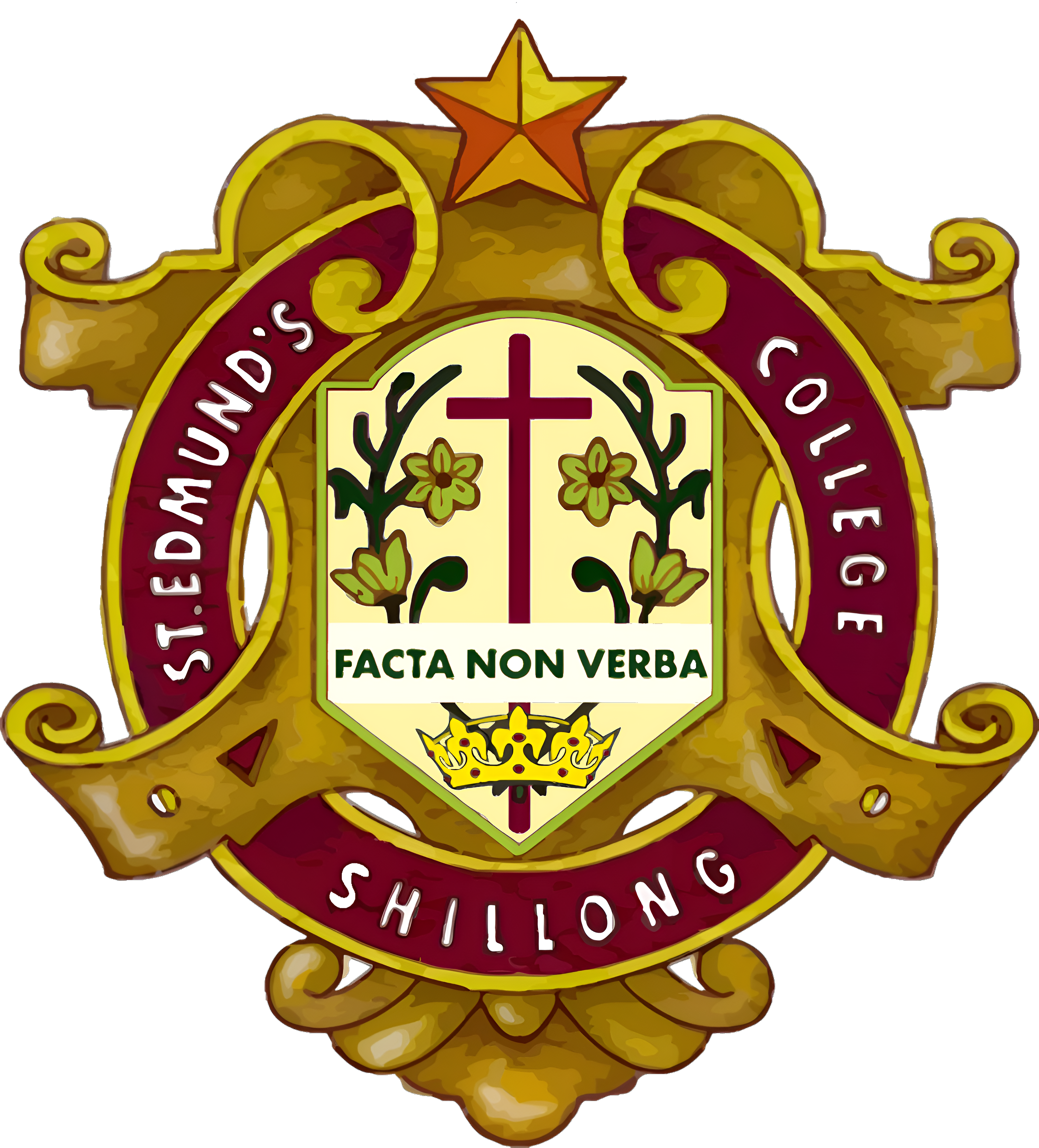
- Motto: Facta non verba
- Motto in English: 'Deeds, not words'
- Type: Co-educational minority degree college
- Established: 1924; 102 years ago
- Founder: Irish Christian Brothers
- Religious affiliation: Roman Catholic (Christian Brothers)
- Academic affiliations: North-Eastern Hill University
- Rector: Br. Sameer A. Ferrao
- Principal: Br. Sunil Britto
- Secretary, Governing Body: Dr. Br. Simon Coelho
- Academic staff: 107 (as of 2012)
- Location: Old Jowai Road, Laitumkhrah, Shillong, Meghalaya, 793003, India
- Campus: 12 acre; Urban
- Website: sec.edu.in

St. Edmund's College, often abbreviated as SEC, is an educational institute of the Congregation of Christian Brothers located in Shillong, Meghalaya, India. It is the oldest college in Meghalaya and second oldest in Northeast India behind Cotton College, Guwahati (1901). It was established in 1924 and celebrated its Centenary Jubilee in 2023. An alumnus of St. Edmund's College, Shillong or St. Edmund's School, Shillong is often called an Edmundian.

== History ==
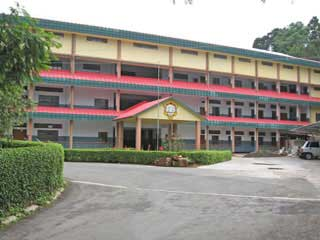
Front view of Edmund's Building

The history of St. Edmund's College, Shillong is intermingled with the brave efforts of the Germans and the Irish. While St. Edmund's College began as a Part Secondary School in 1916 with affiliation from Cambridge University. The college opened on 6 October 1916 , with 32 boarders and 8 day scholars. The institution grew rapidly and by 1918 it had 89 boarders and 23 days scholars. In 1919, the number increased to 100 boarders and 16 day scholars. Out of them, 8 boys were sent, for the first time, for Higher Cambridge Local Certificate Examinations and 3 passed which was considered a remarkable achievement at that time.

Its identity as a true university-level institution began when the Government of India Act 1919 was passed, the college got affiliated with Calcutta University for Intermediate Arts (I.A.) and Intermediate Science (I.Sc.) courses in 1923.

The first classes of the University section of St. Edmund's College opened in 1924. Bro. J.E. McCann was the first principal of the College (he was also the Principal of the St. Edmund's School at this time). From 1924 to 1936, St. Edmund's College was a junior college for intermediate Arts and Science, equivalent to modern-day Higher Secondary education. Bro. J.C. Roe conceived the idea of opening up university classes up to B.A. and B.T. (Bachelor of Teaching) standards and extension of these affiliation was granted on 14 September 1935.

In 1935, it was allowed to teach B.A. and B.T. Courses, the first College in the then Assam to enjoy such distinction. This was the first time when a non-government college in the Assam Province got affiliation up to B.A. and B.T. standards.

With the genesis of Gauhati University on 26 January 1948, the college got affiliated with it. In 1953, with the request of The DPI of Assam and the government, the college opened up courses for B.Sc. The science stream was thus started in August 1959. Later on the college came under NEHU , when it was setup in 1973 with which it remains affiliated to this day. In 1995,when the Pre-University was discontinued in the University, the college was affiliated to the Meghalaya Board of School Education (MBOSE) for the Higher Secondary courses .

The commerce stream was introduced in 1997 along with the introduction of female students into the college . In 2007, the Bachelor for Social Work (BSW) course was introduced. In July 2011, postgraduate courses for master's degree in social work were introduced.

St. Edmund’s College has made commendable progress and has opened up different departments of various disciplines including Electronics, Computer Science, Biochemistry, Biotechnology, Bachelor of Social Work, Environmental Science and B.C.A.

In 2010, the Higher Secondary Section was segregated from the Degree Section of the college, leading to the establishment of St. Edmund's Higher Secondary School, Shillong.

== Administration ==
The 2026 administrative set up of the college are:

- Br. Sunil Britto cfc, (Principal)
- Br. Simon Coelho cfc, (Secretary, Governing Body)
- Br. Sameer A. Ferrao cfc, (Rector and Bursar)

== Campus and buildings ==
Located in Laitumkhrah, Shillong, St. Edmund's College has a campus with many buildings and sports facilities. The main gate is on the south-east side of the campus, located on National Highway 40. The campus stretches up to near Laitumkhrah Bazar in the north-eastern side, traverses towards the north-west up to near the Cathedral of Mary Help of Christians. In between, the northern perimeter is dotted by important institutions and landmarks such as Bethany Society, NCC Office, Mary Rice School, Don Bosco Mini Stadium, etc. The south-western perimeter stretches up to Assam House. The main campus of SEC is shared by St. Edmund's School. The school occupies the south-west section of the campus and has two football fields, a cricket ground, basketball courts, volleyball court, squash court, Chapel and Grotto, living quarters for the Christian Brothers, etc.

== Academic facilities ==
=== Laboratories ===
The Computer Lab, besides holding routine class works also doubles up as the IT Hub of the college taking care of the networking (and maintenance) of different parts of the college.

=== Placement cell ===
The idea of a counseling cell was conceived by the principal Bro E. V. Miranda in 2002. The activities of career related information relating to fields like Chartered Accountants (CA), Master of Business Administration (MBA), Institute of Cost Accountants of India (ICWA), Company Secretary (CS) etc. were carried out. Collected information from various sources like Employment News, other news papers and journals, were shared with the students. The cell used to coordinate placement related activities conducted by organizations that used to voluntarily visit the campus for recruitment purpose.

In 2004 when Bro. L.D. Lobo was the principal, the college started a full-fledged counseling and placement cell. Since then, the placement cell has had its own office. Currently the Cell is coordinated by two members of the staff along with a professional counsellor, who joined in 2009.

=== Biotechnology Centre ===
The institutional Bioinformatics centre located at the premises of the Department of Biotechnology was sanctioned in 2008 and came into existence in 2009 under the BTIS NET programme of Department of Biotechnology, Govt. of India. Since its inception the centre is engaged in bioinformatics research and also initiating various training programmes catering to the needs of the undergraduate students in life science and also the faculty members. Beside these the centre is also engaged in high throughput biotechnology research with a young dedicated faculty and has substantially contributed to the basic science streams pertaining to the needs of students.

=== Library ===
The library of SEC has one of the widest collection of books in Shillong. The library is situated at the ground floor in the new campus building. It has a large reading space for both students and teachers. The library has a collection of well over 50,000 books including 800+ reference books. Apart from the Central Library, each department has its own departmental library in the respective departmental rooms with a reasonable collection of books, mainly for referencing by staff and students of that department. The library of SEC is also a member of the American libraries Kolkata and can loan up to 20 books for eight weeks. Any member can log on to the website and browse their collection and request the required books on social sciences, American literature, management, environment and information technology. Apart from providing book services the library also includes

- Internet service - The library provides internet and audio visual section where students can use for their assignments and projects.
- Clippings - News clipping only of The Economic Times newspaper are provided to help students be aware of the latest developments in the subject. The economics department has prepared the clippings from 2006 onwards.

=== Hostels ===
From 2013, St. Edmund's College maintains three hostels, namely Brother O' Leary Residence (also known as the B.T. Hostel); Bro. J. N. Foley Students' Residence (formerly known as the New Hostel) for about 100 boys and for about 50 girls (exact name may differ). The Bro. O'Leary Residence was founded in 1937 by Rev. Bro. J. I. O'Leary of the Congregation of Irish Christian Brothers as a post-graduate residence for students attending Bachelor of Teaching (B.T.) courses in the St. Edmund's College. After about 14 years to support the changed need of the students, there was qualitative change of the hostel. It was converted into an undergraduate residence for the students of St. Edmund's College in 1951.

The Bro. J. N. Foley Students' Residence was constructed in 1957 and the first batch of Hostel students was taken in 1958. It has accommodation for about 50 boarders. In 1998, the Hostel was dedicated to Bro. J. N Foley a former principal of the College, during whose tenure the hostel was opened. The hostel superintendent has been supported in their care for the students by the respective Principals: Rev. Brothers E. X. Leonard, J. N. Foley, R. B. Vieyra, M. G. Shannon, and W. D' Souza, A. F. Pinto, E. V. Miranda and L. D. Lobo.

A Girls Hostel was established in 2013.

=== Auditorium ===
The College has a multi-purpose auditorium with a seating capacity of approximately 1000 people.

=== Audio/Visual Room ===
SEC has a 100-seat audio-visual room complete with LCD projector, computers, PA system and overhead projector, seminars and workshops etc. are carried out in this room. It is also used as a class room whenever AV aids are required for teaching. Film related to the course of study are screened occasionally. Besides the main AV room, most of the departments have their own LCD projector (with computer) and overhead projectors to aid in their teaching.

=== Canteens ===
The College has one canteen and a coffeehouse. A new outdoor canteen is available next to the Higher Secondary's canteen.

=== Gym ===
The preparation for the gym site and facility began in 2009. The old library (above the students and staff canteen) was selected as the place where the new gym would come up, primarily because of its size (approx 3000 sq. ft. area) and its strategic location. The entire area has wall-to-wall carpeting and big-sized mirrors are fixed on the walls to give an even more spacious look. A 21-station multi-gym opened in April 2010 along with plates and dumbbells bars, stands, racks and benches. The gym was formally inaugurated in June 2010. The gym is open to all students, both boys and girls. A qualified gym instructor and a helper have been appointed to coach the students. Currently, more than a hundred students have enrolled themselves in the gym, along with a few teachers.

== Academic profile ==
The college offers undergraduate courses in B.A., B. Com., B.Sc., BCA and B.SW degrees and postgraduate course in M.SW. The college has 19 teaching Departments covering in the fields of Arts, Science and Commerce and two other training programmes. The faculty or arts has 10 departments: Bengali, English, Economics, Geography, Hindi, History, Khasi, Nepali, Political Science and Sociology. The department of Science consists of Biochemistry, Botany, Chemistry, Computer Science, Electronics, Mathematics, Physics and Zoology and the faculty of Commerce, a fully self-financing faculty, has just one departmental unit of Commerce. The College also runs two self-financing Certificate and Diploma courses. The faculties have academic and administrative linkage with the administration through the office of three Deans, an unusual feature for undergraduate colleges.

The college has a high percentage requirement of student's attendance (80% required by the institution and 75% required by the NEHU) and students missing it are not sent for any University examination.

== College Week ==
Started in 2001, the college week (sometimes called college month depending on how long it's celebrated) is an annual week/month long recreational celebration event held every September (in some years it is held in October). There are over 42 activities available for students to choose and participate in. The event usually commences with outdoor sport activities followed by competitions in various fields. College week is marked by the opening of folk dance performed by the different tribes of SEC students.

== Notable alumni ==
- James Michael Lyngdoh, IAS, former Chief Election Commissioner of India and Ramon Magsaysay Award laureate.
