= Diocese of Jowai =

Roman Catholic diocese in Meghalaya, India

Coordinates: 25.4442°N 92.1962°E

Diocese of Jowai Dioecesis Iovaiensis Ka Jyllaniam Jowai

Location
- Country: India
- Ecclesiastical province: Shillong
- Metropolitan: Shillong

Statistics
- Area: 3,819 km^{2} (1,475 sq mi)
- Population: Total; Catholics: (as of 2020); 437,380; 111,930 (25.6%)

Information
- Rite: Latin Rite
- Established: 28 January 2006; 20 years ago
- Cathedral: Cathedral of St. Theresa of Lisieux in Jowai

Current leadership
- Pope: Leo XIV
- Bishop: Ferdinand Dkhar
- Metropolitan Archbishop: Victor Lyngdoh

Map
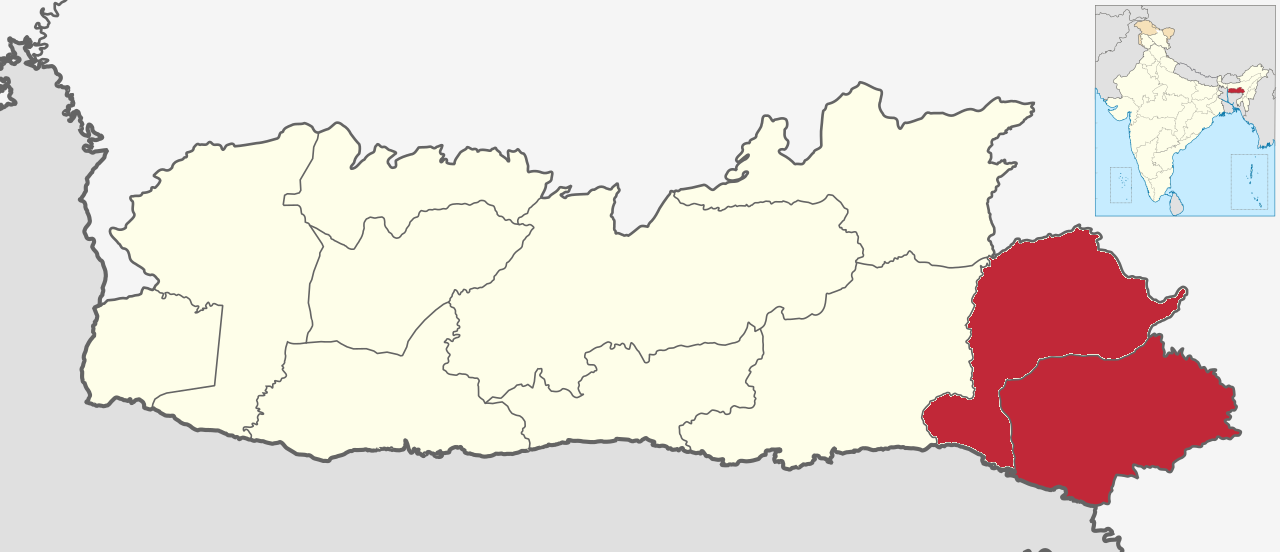

The Roman Catholic Diocese of Jowai (Latin: Iovaien(sis)) is a diocese located in the town of Jowai in the ecclesiastical province of Shillong in India. In a land area of 3,819 square kilometers, the diocesan territory covers the districts of East and West Jaintia Hills in Meghalaya.

== History ==
The Diocese of Jowai was erected on 28 January 2006, by Pope Benedict XVI, and Father Vincent Kympat was appointed its first bishop. He was ordained on 2 April 2006, by the Apostolic Nuncio to India, Archbishop Pedro Lopez Quintana.

== Statistics ==
When the new diocese of Jowai was erected in the year 2006, it had 59,095 baptized Catholics in the territory which covers Jaintia hills district under 7 parishes. The diocese have steadily been growing through the years and in 2019 the population of Catholics in the territory have grown to 111,930 under 18 parishes.

== Leadership ==
- Bishops of Jowai (Latin Rite)
  - Bishop Vincent Kympat (28 January 2006 – 30 July 2011)
    - Bishop Vincent Kympat was born 17 December 1946, in Moosutong in Shillong Diocese. He was ordained a priest on 23 January 1977, in the diocese of Shillong. He was appointed Bishop of Jowai on 28 January 2006 and was ordained on 2 April 2006. Before becoming a prelate Bishop Kympat was the chairman of Faith Formation Commission and Diocesan Coordinator for Small Christian Communities in the Archdiocese of Shillong. He was the Chairman of Small Christian Communities Commission in North Eastern Regional Bishops' Council of India before he died on 30 July 2011.
  - Bishop Victor Lyngdoh( 20 November 2016 - 06 February 2021 ), previously Bishop of Nongstoin Diocese
  - Bishop Ferdinand Dkhar (October 1, 2023 - Present )
