= Joseph Suren Gomes =

Indian Roman Catholic prelate (1944–2024)

Most Reverend Joseph Suren Gomes, SDB
- Bishop Emeritus of Krishnagar
- Church: Roman Catholic Church
- Metropolis: Roman Catholic Archdiocese of Calcutta
- Diocese: Roman Catholic Diocese of Krishnagar
- Installed: 17 April 2002
- Term ended: 17 April 2019
- Predecessor: Lucas Sirkar, SDB
- Successor: Nirmol Vincent Gomes, SDB

Orders
- Ordination: 21 December 1974
- Consecration: 31 May 2002 by Lucas Sirkar, SDB

Personal details
- Born: Joseph Suren Gomes; 14 February 1944 Hasnabad, Bengal Province, British India
- Died: 18 May 2024 (aged 80) Ranaghat, West Bengal, India
- Denomination: Roman Catholic
- Motto: In Deo confide

Styles of Joseph Suren Gomes
- Reference style: His Excellency; The Most Reverend
- Spoken style: Your Excellency
- Religious style: Bishop

Joseph Suren Gomes, SDB (14 February 1944 – 18 May 2024) was an Indian Roman Catholic prelate. He was bishop of Krishnagar from 2002 to 2019 when he retired. Gomes died from heart failure in Ranaghat, on 18 May 2024, at the age of 80.

Catholic Church titles
Preceded by Lucas Sirkar, SDB	Bishop of Krishnagar; 2002–2019	Succeeded by Nirmol Vincent Gomes, SDB
