= Diocese of Tura =

Roman Catholic diocese in Meghalaya, India

Coordinates: 25.5259°N 90.2215°E

Diocese of Tura Dioecesis Turana

Location
- Country: India
- Ecclesiastical province: Shillong
- Metropolitan: Shillong

Statistics
- Area: 8,500 km^{2} (3,300 sq mi)
- Population: Total; Catholics: (as of 2020); 1,177,748; 326,716 (27.7%)

Information
- Rite: Latin Rite
- Established: 1 March 1973
- Cathedral: Cathedral of Mary Help of Christians in Tura, Meghalaya

Current leadership
- Pope: Leo XIV
- Bishop: Andrew Marak
- Metropolitan Archbishop: Victor Lyngdoh
- Auxiliary Bishops: Jose Chirakal

Map
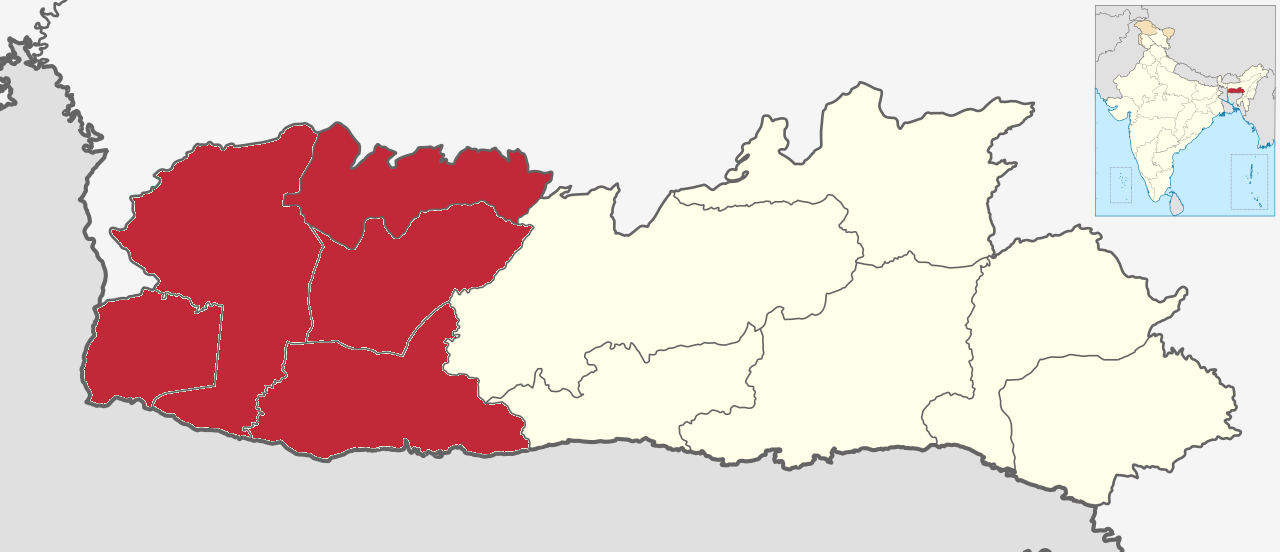

The Roman Catholic Diocese of Tura (Latin: Dioecesis Turana) is a diocese located in the city of Tura in the ecclesiastical province of Shillong in India.

== History ==
- March 1, 1973: Established as Diocese of Tura from the Metropolitan Archdiocese of Shillong–Gauhati

== Bishops ==
- Bishops of Tura (Latin Rite)
  - Bishop Oreste Marengo, S.D.B. (Apostolic Administrator June 26, 1969 – January 12, 1979)
  - Bishop George Mamalassery (January 12, 1979 – April 21, 2007)
  - Bishop Andrew Marak (April 21, 2007 – present)

=== Coadjutor Bishop ===
- Andrew Marak (2004-2007)

=== Auxiliary Bishop ===
- Jose Chirackal (2020-)

== Saints and causes for canonisation ==
- Servant of God Bishop Oreste Marengo, SDB
