= Lorenz Hopfenmüller =

The Reverend Servant of God Lorenz Hopfenmüller S.D.S.
- Prefect of Assam
- Church: Roman Catholic Church
- Archdiocese: Shillong
- Diocese: Shillong

Orders
- Ordination: 7 May 1957
- Rank: Catholic Priest

Personal details
- Born: May 29, 1844 Weismain Germany
- Died: August 20, 1890 (aged 46) Shillong, India
- Education: University of Würzburg

Lorenz Hopfenmüller, also known as Father Otto Hopfenmüller, was a Catholic priest of the religious order of the Society of the Divine Saviour. He was the first Apostolic prefect of the Roman Catholic Archdiocese of Shillong (Assam Mission).

== Early life ==
Hopfenmüller was born on 29 May 1844 in Weismain, Germany. He completed his doctorate from University of Würzburg.

== Priesthood ==
On 6 October 1866, Hopfenmüller was ordained a priest for the Roman Catholic Archdiocese of Bamberg but in 1887 he became a professed member of the Society of the Divine Saviour and took the religious name Otto.

== Foreign mission ==
In 1889, Hopfenmüller was sent to a foreign mission in Assam, India and was appointed prefect of the mission on 31 December 1889. He started to translate the Holy Bible and wrote a catechism in the local Khasi language.

== Death ==
Hopfenmüller died in Assam, India on 20 August 1890 due to heat stroke.

== See also ==
- List of saints of India
