= Diocese of Krishnagar =

Roman Catholic diocese in West Bengal, India

Coordinates: 23.4052°N 88.4867°E

Diocese of Krishnagar Dioecesis Krishnagarensis কৃশনগর এর বিশপের এলাকা
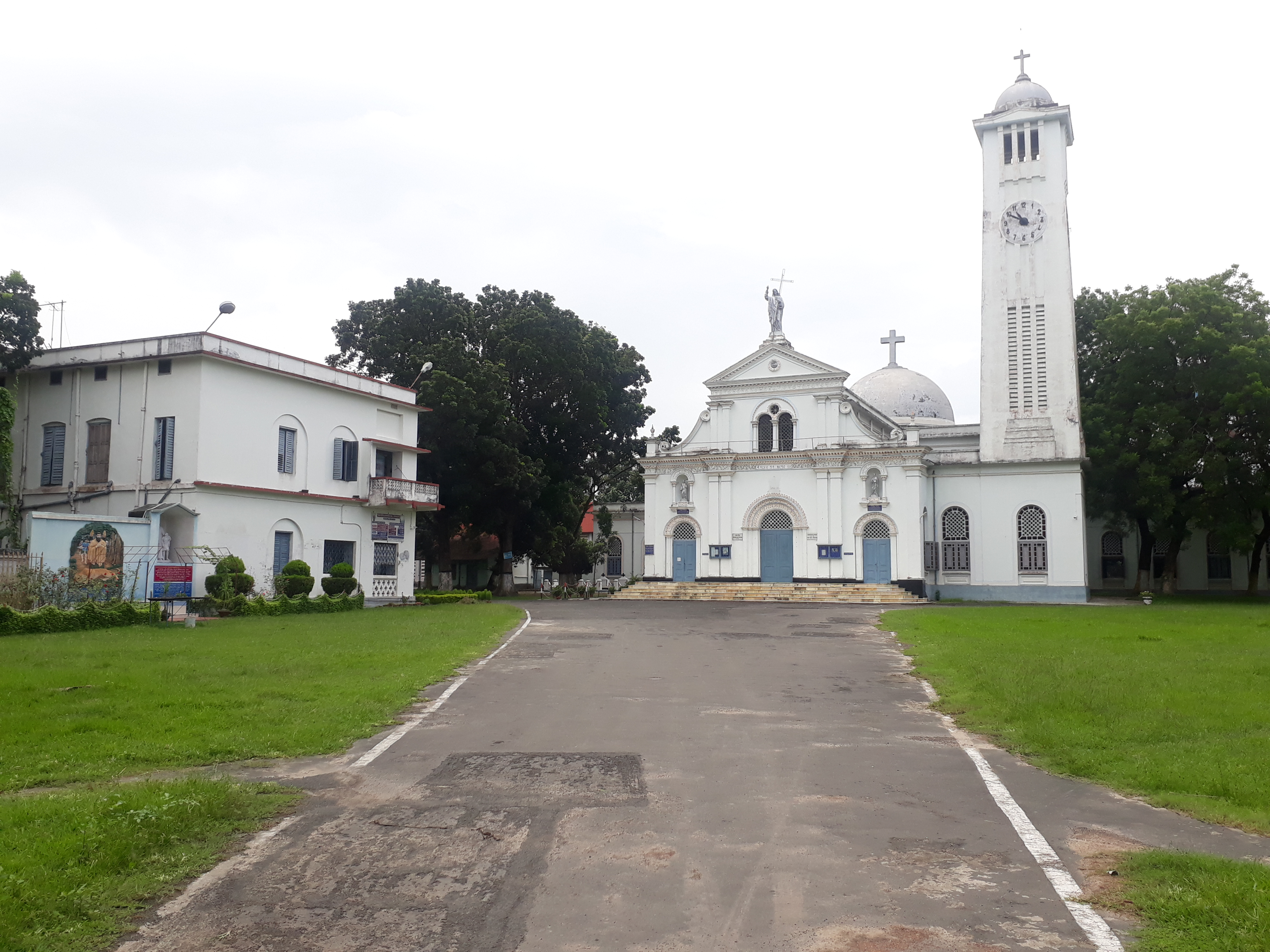
- Front view of the Diocese

Location
- Country: India
- Ecclesiastical province: Calcutta
- Metropolitan: Calcutta

Statistics
- Area: 8,640 km^{2} (3,340 sq mi)
- Population: Total; Catholics: (as of 2004); 10,561,058; 61,158 (0.6%)

Information
- Rite: Latin Rite
- Cathedral: Cathedral of the Holy Redeemer in Krishnanagar, Nadia

Current leadership
- Pope: Leo XIV
- Bishop: Nirmol Vincent Gomes
- Metropolitan Archbishop: Thomas D’Souza

The Roman Catholic Diocese of Krishnagar (Latin: Krishnagaren(sis)) is a diocese located in the city of Krishnagar in the ecclesiastical province of Calcutta in India.

== History ==
- 1855: Established as Missio Sui Iuris of Central Bengal from the Apostolic Vicariate of Western Bengal
- 19 July 1870: Promoted as Apostolic Prefecture of Central Bengal
- 1 September 1886: Promoted as Diocese of Central Bengal
- 7 June 1887: Renamed as Diocese of Krishnagar

== Leadership ==
Superiors

- Fr. Albino Parietti, P.I.M.E. (1855 - 30 November 1864)
- Fr. Luigi Limana, P.I.M.E. (1864 - 17 March 1870)

Apostolic prefects

- Fr. Antonio Marietti, P.I.M.E. (August 1870 - 1878)
- Fr. Francesco Pozzi, P.I.M.E. (April 1879 - 25 November 1886)

Bishops of Krishnagar

- Bishop Francesco Pozzi, P.I.M.E. (25 November 1886 – 22 October 1905)
- Bishop Santino Taveggia, P.I.M.E. (23 August 1906 – 1927)
- Bishop Stephen Ferrando, S.D.B. (later Archbishop) (9 July 1934 – 26 November 1935)
- Bishop Louis La Ravoire Morrow, S.D.B. (25 May 1939 – 31 October 1969)
- Bishop Matthew Baroi, S.D.B. (17 September 1973 – 4 April 1983)
  - Apostolic Administrator 1970 – 17 September 1973
- Bishop Lucas Sirkar (later Archbishop) (22 June 1984 – 14 April 2000)
- Bishop Joseph Suren Gomes, S.D.B. (17 April 2002 – 17 April 2019)
- Bishop Nirmol Vincent Gomes (since 30 April 2022)

== Saints and causes for canonisation ==
- Ven. Francesco Convertini
