= Archdiocese of Shillong =

Roman Catholic archdiocese in Meghalaya, India

Coordinates: 25°34′N 91°53′E

Metropolitan Archdiocese of Shillong Archidioecesis Shillongensis Ka Jyllaniam Bah Shillong
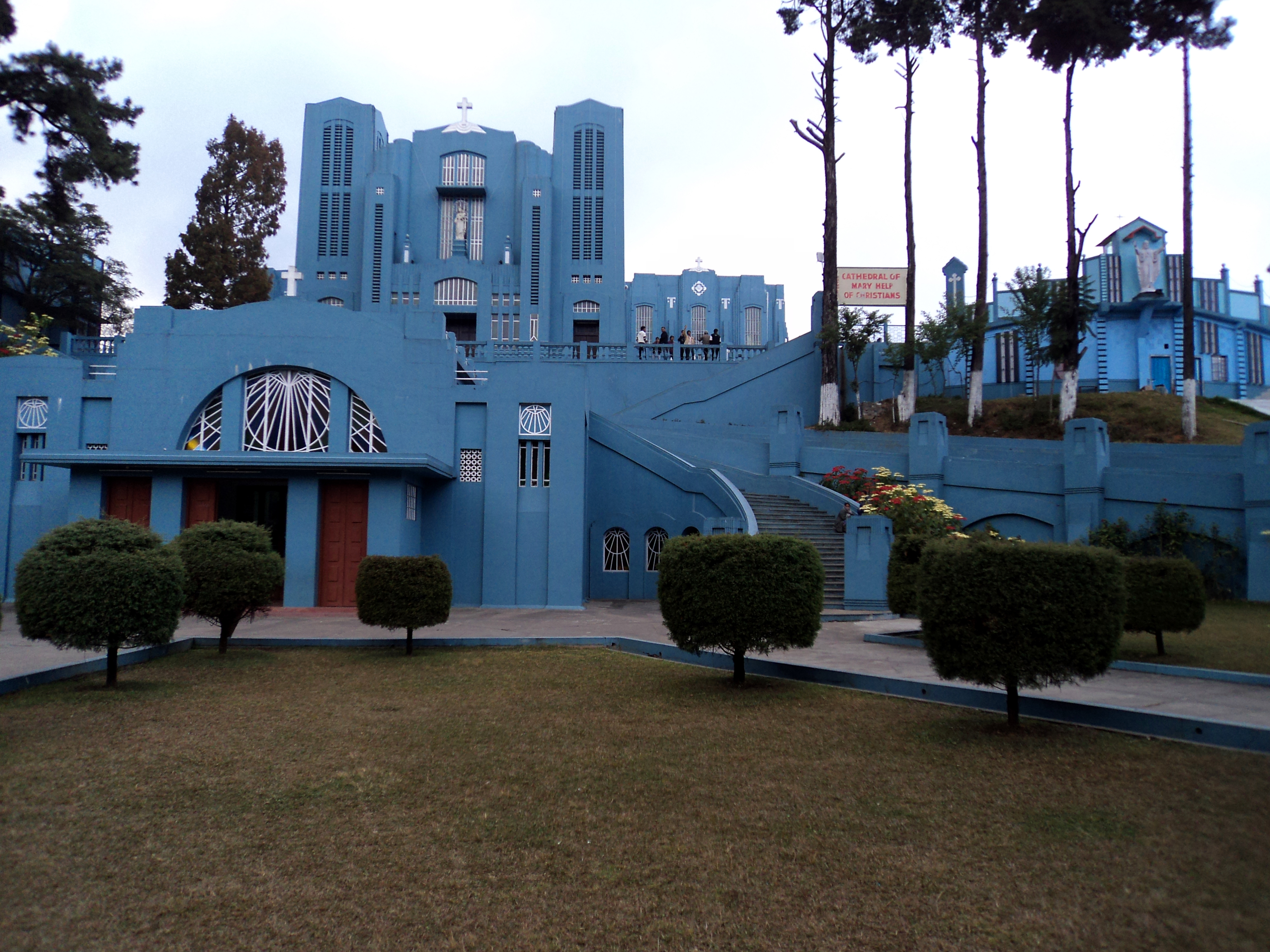
- Cathedral of Mary Help of Christians

Location
- Country: India
- Territory: East Khasi Hills and Ri Bhoi District
- Episcopal conference: "Conference of Catholic Bishops of India"
- Ecclesiastical region: The North Eastern Regional Bishops' Council
- Ecclesiastical province: Province of Shillong
- Metropolitan: Metropolitan Archdiocese of Shillong
- Subdivisions: 8 zones
- Headquarters: Archbishop House, Cathedral of Mary Help of Christians, Laitumkhrah, Shillong

Statistics
- Area: 5,196 km^{2} (2,006 sq mi)
- Population: Total; Catholics: (as of 2021); 1,233,000; 346,060 (28.1%)
- Parishes: 49

Information
- Denomination: Catholic Church
- Sui iuris church: Latin Church
- Rite: Roman Rite
- Established: 1890; 136 years ago
- Cathedral: Cathedral of Mary Help of Christians in Shillong
- Patron saint: Mary Help of Christians
- Secular priests: 189
- Language: Khasi , English
- Calendar: Gregorian calendar

Current leadership
- Parent church: "Diocese of Krishnagar"
- Pope: Leo XIV
- Metropolitan Archbishop: Victor Lyngdoh
- Auxiliary Bishops: Bernard Laloo

Map
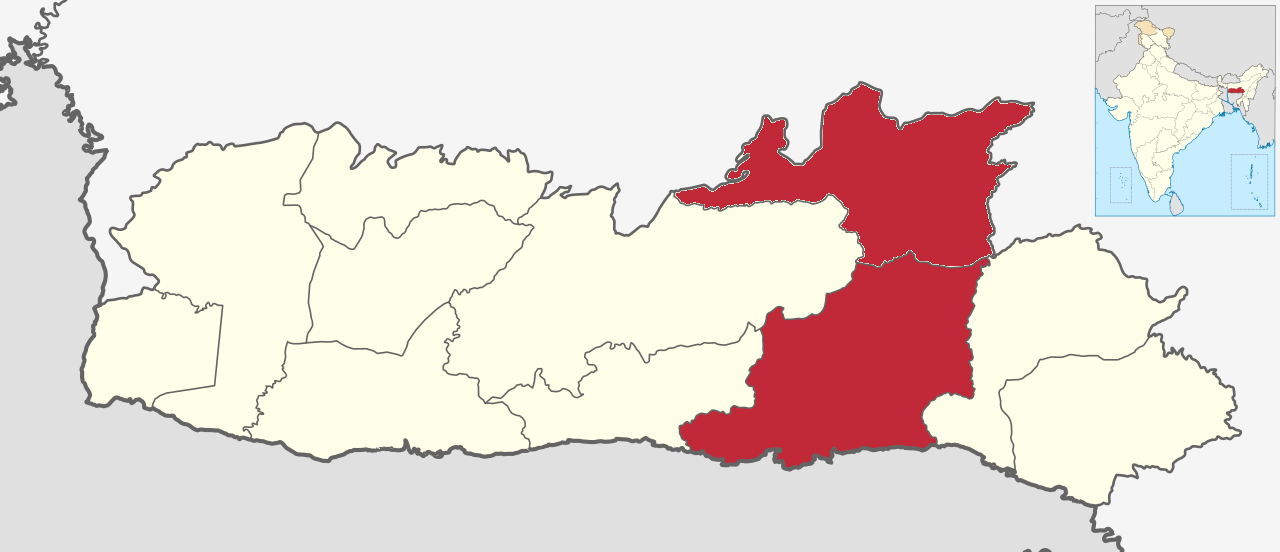

Website
- archdioceseofshillong

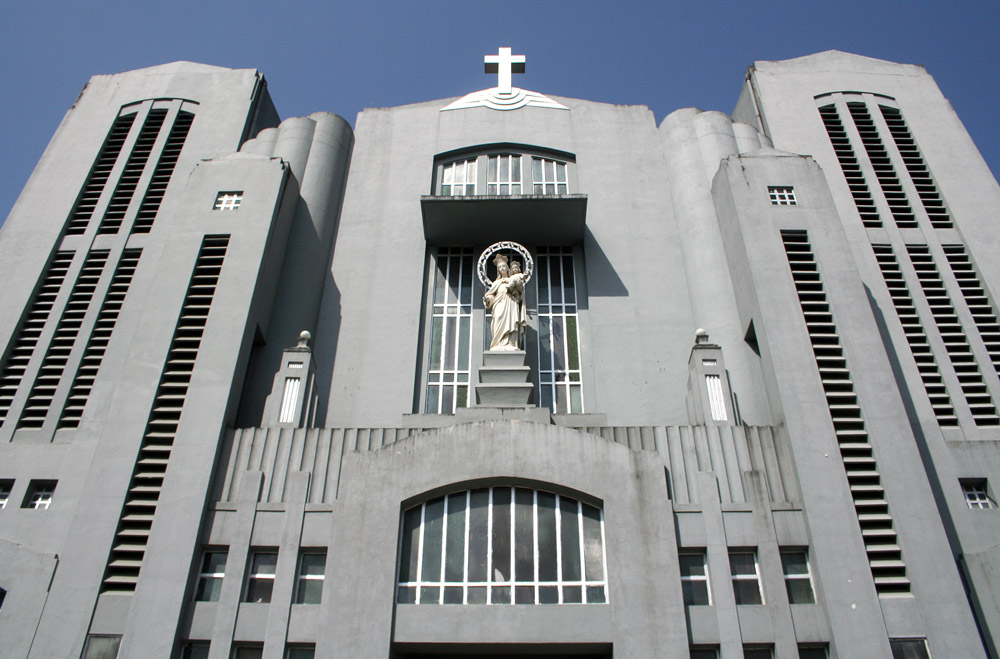
Statue of Mary Help of Christians on the facade of the cathedral

The Metropolitan Archdiocese of Shillong (Latin: Shillongensis) is a Catholic archdiocese with its jurisdiction in the two district of Ri Bhoi and East Khasi Hills State of Meghalaya, in northeastern India. The Archdiocese of Shillong is also the metropolitan diocese of the Province of Shillong, an ecclesiastical province in Northeast India. It serves 346,060 followers in 49 parishes under 8 zones in the 2 districts. The rural parishes are usually divided into Village Church called "Balang shnong" , each with a head known as "Rangbah Balang" who assist the Parish Priest at the village level while urban parishes are divided into CMCs and balang dong . The Archdiocese usually organised programmes, teaching and worship at Diocese level, Zonal Level, Parish level, CMC (Catholic Managing Committee)/ village level and Small Christian communities or Kynhun Balang barit (KBB).

== History ==
- Established on 15 December 1889 as the Apostolic Prefecture of Assam on territory split off from the Diocese of Krishnagar
- 9 July 1934: Promoted as Diocese of Shillong
- Lost territory on 12 July 1951 to establish the Roman Catholic Diocese of Dibrugarh
- Lost territory on 16 January 1964 to establish the Roman Catholic Diocese of Tezpur
- 26 June 1969: Promoted as Metropolitan Archdiocese of Gauhati–Shillong
- 22 January 1970: Renamed as Metropolitan Archdiocese of Shillong–Gauhati
- Lost territory on 1 March 1973 to establish the Roman Catholic Diocese of Tura
- Lost territory on 5 December 1983 to establish the Roman Catholic Diocese of Diphu
- Lost territory on 30 March 1992 and renamed as Metropolitan Archdiocese of Shillong to establish the now Roman Catholic Archdiocese of Guwahati
- Lost territory on 28 January 2006 to establish the Roman Catholic Diocese of Nongstoin
- Lost territory on 28 January 2006 to establish the Roman Catholic Diocese of Jowai

== Cathedral ==
The cathedral of the Archdiocese is the Cathedral of Mary Help of Christians, in Shillong. It was built over 50 years ago. This place of worship stands on the very site of the first Church built by the German fathers (Salvatorians from Germany).

The earlier 1913 building – the Church of the Divine Saviour – was a wooden structure. It was destroyed in the Good Friday fire of 10 April 1936. Built by the first Catholic missionaries to set foot on these hills, the Salvatorians from Germany, it was the first Catholic Cathedral in what was then the Mission of Assam.

== Ordinaries ==
The Catholic Church's presence in the northeastern region of India, particularly in Assam and Meghalaya, has been marked by a succession of ecclesiastical leaders. Beginning with Apostolic Prefects overseeing the early missionary efforts, the hierarchy evolved to include bishops and later metropolitan archbishops.

Apostolic Prefects of Assam

- Fr. Otto Hopfenmüller, Salvatorians (S.D.S.) (1890)
- Fr. Angelus Münzloher, (S.D.S.) (1890 - 1906)
- Fr. Cristoforo Becker, (S.D.S.) (1906 – 1921)
- Fr. Louis Mathias, S.D.B. (15 December 1922 – 9 July 1934 see below)

Bishops of Shillong

- Louis Mathias, S.D.B. (see above 9 July 1934 – 25 March 1935), later Metropolitan Archbishop of Madras (India) (1935.03.25 – 1952.11.13) and Metropolitan Archbishop of (renamed) Madras and Mylapore(India) (1952.11.13 – 1965.08.02)
- Stephen Ferrando, S.D.B. (26 November 1935 – 26 June 1969); previously Bishop of Krishnagar (India) (1934.07.09 – 1935.11.26), later Titular Archbishop of Troina (1969.06.26 – 1978.06.21)

Metropolitan Archbishops of Gauhati–Shillong

- Hubert D Rosario, S.D.B. (1969.06.26 – 1970.01.22 see below), previously Bishop of Dibrugarh (India) (1964.07.06 – 1969.06.26)

Metropolitan Archbishops of Shillong – Gauhati

- Hubert D’Rosario, S.D.B. (as above 26 June 1969 – 30 March 1992 see below)

Metropolitan Archbishops of Shillong

- Hubert D’Rosario, S.D.B. (as above 30 March 1992 – 30 August 1994)
- Tarcisius Resto Phanrang, S.D.B. (2 August 1995 – 5 May 1999), previously Titular Bishop of Corniculana & Auxiliary Bishop of Shillong (India) (1990.06.11 – 1995.08.02)
- Dominic Jala, S.D.B. (22 December 1999 – 10 October 2019)
- Victor Lyngdoh , Diocesan (28 December 2020 – Present) , previously Bishop of Nongstoin and Jowai Dioceses
- Bernard Laloo , Diocesan (March 30, 2025 - Present ) , Auxiliary Bishop

== Ecclesiastical Province of Shillong ==
The Shillong Archdiocese serves not only as an ecclesiastical seat but also as the metropolitan Archdiocese of the Shillong province. A province within the Catholic Church is a grouping of dioceses under the authority of an archbishop. In the case of the Shillong province, it comprises the Shillong Archdiocese itself, along with the Tura Diocese, Aizawl Diocese, Agartala Diocese, Jowai Diocese, and Nongstoin Diocese. This arrangement reflects the hierarchical structure of the Church, wherein archbishops oversee the administration and spiritual welfare of multiple dioceses within their respective province.

The Archbishop of Shillong though have no ruling power over the other dioceses but in disputes within a diocese of the province, the diocese may seek assistance from the metropolitan archdiocese of their ecclesiastical province where the metropolitan Archbishop may intervene under canon law.

The Province of Shillong comprises the following suffragan dioceses that has Shillong as its metropolitan see:

- Agartala
- Aizawl
- Jowai
- Nongstoin
- Tura

== Parishes ==
The Archdiocese of Shillong comprises 49 parishes divided into 8 zones :

Zone	Church Name	Parish	Year Established	Ecclesiastical Administration
Zone 1	St. Dominic Savio Church	Mawlai	1938	Salesians of Don Bosco (SDB)
Zone 1	St. Joseph's Church	Mawkhar	1951	Diocesan
Zone 1	Sts. Peter and Paul Church	Pynthorumkhrah	1997	Salesians of Don Bosco (SDB)
Zone 1	Church of the Visitation	Mawprem	2002	Diocesan
Zone 1	St. Anne's Church	Mawtawar	2024	Society of the Divine Saviour (SDS)
Zone 1	Our Lady of Holy Rosary Church	Mawïong	2024	Diocesan
Zone 2	Cathedral of Mary Help of Christians	Laitumkhrah	1890	Diocesan
Zone 2	St. Paul's Church	Upper Shillong	1965	Diocesan
Zone 2	St. John the Apostle Church	Laban	1974	Diocesan
Zone 2	Divine Saviour Church	Nongthymmai	1974	Salesians of Don Bosco (SDB)
Zone 2	Mary Queen of Peace Church	Mawñianglah	2024	Diocesan
Zone 2	Mary Mother of Hope Church	Rangbihbih-Pomlakrai	2026	Diocesan
Zone 3	St. John Bosco Shrine	Sohra	1931	Salesians of Don Bosco (SDB)
Zone 3	Resurrection Church	Pynursla	1957	Diocesan
Zone 3	Blessed Sacrament Church	Laitlyngkot	1983	Diocesan
Zone 3	Mary Queen of Peace Church	Laitkroh	2003	
Zone 3	Sts. Peter and Paul Church	Laitkynsew	2004	Society of the Divine Saviour (SDS)
Zone 3	St. Mother Teresa Church	Nongshyrngan	2016	
Zone 4	U Khrist Jingshai Church	Marbisu	1950	Diocesan
Zone 4	St. Francis Xavier's Church	Mawsynram	1976	Congregation of Missionary Sons of the Immaculate Heart of the Blessed Virgin Mary (CMF)
Zone 4	Mary Queen of the Holy Rosary Church	Dangar	1993	
Zone 4	St. George's Church	Wahlang	2002	
Zone 4	Sacred Heart Church	Diengïei	2007	
Zone 4	St. Stephen Church	Sawsymper	2008	
Zone 5	Good Shepherd Church	Jongksha	1972	Congregation of Holy Cross (CSC)
Zone 5	Holy Cross Church	Mawkynrew	1987	Congregation of Holy Cross (CSC)
Zone 5	Divine Mercy Church	Mawryngkneng	2003	
Zone 5	St. Joseph's Church	Laitkor	2004	Diocesan
Zone 5	U Khrist U Syiem Church	Madanrting	2024	Diocesan
Zone 5	Sacred Heart Church	Smit	2025	Salesians of Don Bosco (SDB)
Zone 5	Immaculate Heart of Mary Church	Thynroit	2027	
Zone 6	Our Lady of the Assumption Church	Nongpoh	1953	Salesians of Don Bosco (SDB)
Zone 6	Our Lady of Lourdes Church	Umkadhor	1985	
Zone 6	St. Francis of Assisi Church	Byrnihat	1999	
Zone 6	Lum Sinai Church	Umden	2006	
Zone 6	St. Francis of Assisi Church	Umsiang	2023	
Zone 6	Our Lady of Miracles Church	Umtyrnga	2025	
Zone 7	Epiphany Church	Mawbri	1972	Diocesan
Zone 7	Church of the Ascension	Umsohlait	1972	Diocesan
Zone 7	Mary Mother of God Church	Umsning	1977	Diocesan
Zone 7	St. Paul's Church	Mawlasnai	2009	
Zone 7	St. Francis Xavier Church	Umbir	2013	Society of Jesus (SJ)
Zone 7	U Khrist U Syiem ka Jingkyrmen Church	Mawkyrdep	2026	
Zone 7	Holy Family Church	Zero Point-Umshorshor	2027	
Zone 8	Sacred Heart Shrine	Nongmensong	2010	Diocesan
Zone 8	Immaculate Heart of Mary Church	Mawpat	2012	Congregation of Missionary Sons of the Immaculate Heart of the Blessed Virgin Mary (CMF)
Zone 8	St. Rose of Lima Church	Umpling	2024	Diocesan
Zone 8	St. Dominic Savio Church	Nongrah	2024	Diocesan
Zone 8	Mary Help of Christians Church	Mawpdang	2024	Salesians of Don Bosco (SDB)

== Diocesan institutions ==
=== Seminary ===
The Archdiocese of Shillong currently have the following seminary for men who aspire to be a Diocesan Priest :

1. St. Paul's Apostolic Seminary , Upper Shillong - A minor seminary and a prestigious seminary that has produced many great priests and bishops . This seminary is only for those studying in Class 8 to 10 .
2. St. Xavier Minor Seminary , Upper Shillong - a minor seminary for boys of Class 11 and 12
3. Christ King College , Shillong - a Major Seminary of the Archdiocese of Shillong for Philosophical formation
4. Oriens Theological College , Shillong - An inter-diocesan major seminary for Northeast India under the patronage of the Northeast Regional Catholic Bishop’s Council (NRCRC). It offers the four-year theology programme for candidates to priesthood and is affiliated to the Pontifical Urbaniana University, Rome, which grants the Degree of Bachelor of Theology (B. Th.) to eligible students.

There are also Seminary and formation houses operated by Religious Congregations such as Savio Juniorate and Sacred Heart Theological College by the Salesians of Don Bosco ,

=== Healthcare Services ===
- Nazareth Hospital , Shillong

=== School Education ===
The administration of schools in the archdiocese is autonomously handle by the Parishes .

For example , the Parish School of Cathedral Parish is Divine Saviour Higher Secondary School , Shillong .

Apart from Parish Schools , there are many autonomous schools run by religious congregations notably the SDB , RNDM , etc . The iconic Don Bosco Square in Laitumkhrah is surrounded by such around it namely St. Anthony's School by the SDB , St. Mary's School by the RNDM Sisters , St. Margaret's School by the MSMHC Sisters , Loreto Convent by the Loreto Sisters , St. Edmund's School by the Christian Brothers .

=== Higher Education ===
The Archdiocese currently has only one higher education institute in Ri Bhoi District , i.e. Balawan College offering Bachelor Degree program .

Most higher education colleges in the diocesan are operated by religious congregations such as St. Anthony's College , St. Edmund's College , St. Mary's College , Rapsbun School of Nursing ,etc . There is only one upcoming Catholic University in the state of Meghalaya , called "St. Xavier University" by the Jesuits of North East India Province.

== Saints and causes for canonisation ==
- Venerable Stephen Ferrando,SDB
- Venerable Constantine Vendrame, SDB
- Lorenz Hopfenmuller (Otto),SDS

== Laity Associations ==
The Archdiocese has primarily 3 associations for the laity. These include:

1. Shillong Archdiocese Catholic Youth Movement (SACYM) - For the youths aged 15 above . SACYM is further divided into their respective zone , parishes and villages . Every year there is a convention in each zone/archdiocese level.
2. Synjuk ki Seng Rangbah Katholik , Archdiocese of Shillong - For men aged 35 above whether married or not. It is further divided into their respective zone , parishes and villages . There is an "Annual Meet" in each zone/archdiocese level.
3. Synjuk ki Seng Kynthei Katholik , Archdiocese of Shillong - For women aged 35 above whether married or not. It is further divided into their respective zone , parishes and villages . There is an "Dorbar" in each zone/archdiocese level.

Apart from the above , there are also third orders of different religious congregations such as Salesians Cooperators , etc .

== The centenary celebration of the erection of the Diocese of Shillong. ==
The Archdiocese of Shillong was erected as a diocese in 1934 . Preparation for the centenary celebration in 2034 is going on notably with the 9 Year Novena focusing on each theme which started in the Advent of 2024 with the Year of Reconciliation to Advent 2025 proclaimed by Archbishop Victor Lyngdoh in the Annual Eucharistic Procession and so on , each year with a specific theme .

Also to note that the Diocese has been elevated to an Archdiocese in 1969 . Its Diamond Jubilee Celebration is going to be celebrated in 2029 .

== Sources and external links ==
- GCatholic.org, with incumbent biography links ^{[self-published]}
- Catholic Hierarchy ^{[self-published]}
- Archdiocese website
