= Stephen Ferrando =

Venerable Archbishop Stephen Ferrando S.D.B.
- Bishop of Shillong
- Church: Roman Catholic Church
- Diocese: Shillong
- Appointed: 26 November 1925
- Term ended: 26 June 1969
- Predecessor: Louis Mathias
- Successor: Hubert D'Rosario
- Other post: Titular Archbishop of Troyna (1969–1978)
- Previous post: Bishop of Krishnagar (1934)

Orders
- Ordination: 18 March 1923
- Consecration: 10 November 1934 by Ferdinand Périer

Personal details
- Born: Stefano Ferrando; 28 September 1895 Rossiglione, Italy
- Died: 21 June 1978 (aged 82) Genoa-Quarto, Genoa, Italy
- Motto: Apostolus Christi ("Apostle of Christ")

Sainthood
- Venerated in: Roman Catholic Church
- Title as Saint: Venerable
- Attributes: Bishop's attire
- Patronage: Diocese of Krishnagar; Archdiocese of Shillong; Missionary Sisters of Mary, Help of Christians; Missionaries

Stephen Ferrando (28 September 1895 – 21 June 1978) was an Italian Roman Catholic priest belonging to the Salesians of Don Bosco. He served in the missions in Asia once he was ordained and was stationed in India where he led a diocese of his own. He also established his religious congregation.

On 3 March 2016 he was proclaimed to be Venerable after Pope Francis recognized that Ferrando led a life of heroic virtue.

== Life ==
Stephen Ferrando was born on 28 September 1895 in Genoa; he was the second of three children. He studied at the Salesian school and served in WWI. After the war he taught for a year and then returned to the Salesian school to study for the ministry. Ferrando was ordained to the priesthood on 18 March 1923 at the Salesian Institute of Borgo San Martino in Alessandria.

A few months later he was assigned to serve in British India as part of the third batch of missionaries dispatched. Ferrando left Venice on 2 December 1923 along with nine companions, reaching Shillong, then the capital of the Assam province of British India and headquarters of the Prefecture Apostolic of Assam, on 23 December. There he was entrusted with the task of forming future missionary personnel for the Prefecture. He served in several capacities, including as the catechist and then the Rector of Our Lady's House in Shillong, as well as Master of Novices. In 1929, he became a Council Member of the Provincial team of the Salesians in the diocese.

At that time, the Holy See had entrusted the Archdiocese of Madras, and the diocese of Krishnanagar, and the Apostolic Prefecture of Assam to the Salesians.

The young diocese was faced with many challenges, none greater than the shortage of personnel. Ferrando immediately threw himself into the work of increasing the diocesan personnel. On 18 March 1932, he wrote to the Rector Major of the Salesians: "St. Francis Xavier made that emotional appeal to the studious youth of his times. From the same wonderful land of India I renew his appeal so that many may come to work in Assam ... The harvest is rich... but the laborers are few".

On 9 July 1934, Ferrando was appointed the bishop of Krishnanagar in Nadiab, the island-city in the province of Bengal; he choose Apostolus Christi ("An apostle for Christ") as his motto. He received his episcopal consecration on the following 10 November.

Ferrando was transferred to the Diocese of Shillong and became the second Bishop of Shillong on 26 November 1935, a position he held until 26 June 1969 when he retired.

At that time, missionaries were valued as facilitators for social improvement and uplift, and delegations were continually calling on Ferrando from the Asom, Khasis, Mundas, Karbis, Tiwas, Bodos, the Manipuris, Garos, Nagas and other tribes requesting that he assign priests, nuns, doctors, educationists and other personnel to their communities. In his annual report of 1945–46, Ferrando wrote: "This makes me very anxious, because if once a favorable occasion is lost, it is difficult to regain it". Missionaries such as L. Piasecki, A. Pianazzi, C. Vendrame and A. Ravalico expended themselves to conform and strengthen the Christians of the large and extensive diocese.

On 10 April 1936, the Bishop's House went up in flames. Ferrando immediately began plans to build the diocese a proper catgedral with adjacent seminary, bishop's house and a resthouse for missionaries. At the beginning of 1937, Ferrando spent several weeks visiting villages and baptized hundreds of catechumens and confirmed two hundred others.

During World War II, the British Government ordered the internment of most of the Italian and German missionaries throughout British India. While fifty-six of his missionaries were interned or expelled, he was left with thirty priests and twenty other clerics to staff the diocese. Believing it necessary to organize the local people to take up clerical positions, Ferrando founded the Missionary Sisters of Mary, Help of Christians (MSMHC) in 1942. This was the first indigenous congregation in the area. In 1962, he succeeded in setting up the St. Paul's Minor Seminary in Shillong.

In early 1969, the Government of India declared that foreign missionaries must be recalled and replaced by locals; as a result of this, Ferrando submitted his resignation to Pope Paul VI and made way for an Indian citizen to be appointed. He was given the title Titular Archbishop of Troyna and retired to Italy, where he lived in his hometown of Genoa.

Ferrando was a regular contributor of articles of missiological, cultural, anthropological, geographical and historical nature on the Assam Mission to such publications as the Bollettino Salesiano, Gioventù Missionaria and more.

Ferrando died in Genoa on 21 June 1978. He was buried at the chapel of the St. Margaret’s Convent “Peachlands” in Laitumkrah, Shillong.

== Beatification process ==
The process of beatification commenced in Shillong after the Archdiocese of Genoa transferred its rights to conducting the cause on 11 April 2003. The Congregation for the Causes of Saints - under Pope John Paul II - granted approval to the cause on 23 April 2003 which gave Ferrando the title Servant of God. The diocesan process spanned from 8 August 2003 until 13 August 2006. The Congregation declared the process valid on 17 October 2008 and began their evaluation.

The postulation compiled the Positio for the Congregation and submitted it to them upon its completion in 2012. On 5 March 2015 the theologians advising the Congregation approved his life and virtues while the Congregation itself met on 23 February 2016 and also approved the cause's continuation - it received papal approval on 3 March 2016 allowing for Pope Francis to declare him as Venerable.

The postulator is Pierluigi Cameroni.

== Other honours ==
He received several honours during his life, including;

- A Medal of Honour by the Lt. General of the King of Italy (1917)
- Conferred title of Commandatore by Victor Emmanuel III (1935)
- Diploma Accademico Onorario by the president, archeological Academy of Italy (1974)

Catholic Church titles
Preceded by Louis Mathias	Bishop of Shillong; 26 November 1935-26 June 1969	Succeeded by Hubert D'Rosario
