= Constantine Vendrame =

Italian Salesian missionary

Venerable Constantine Vendrame SDB
- Born: 27 August 1893; San Martino di Colle Umberto, Treviso, Italy
- Died: 30 January 1957 (aged 63); Dibrugarh, Assam, India

Constantine Vendrame, also known as the "Apostle of Shillong" was a Salesian missionary from Italy who worked for the welfare of Khasis, in North East, India.

== Early life and education ==
Constantine Vendrame was born on 27 August 1893 to Pietro and Elena Fiori in San Martino di Colle Umberto, Treviso, Italy. He joined the Salesian novitiate at Ivrea on 15 September 1913. He completed his study of philosophy and was sent for his regency to the oratory of Chioggia. He also served for a four-year compulsory military service. After the completion of his military service, he pursued his theological formation while working simultaneously in the oratories of Chioggia and Venice.

== Priesthood ==
On 15 March 1924 Vendrame was ordained a Catholic priest by the cardinal Eugenio Tosi at the chapel of the Archiepiscopal seminary of Milan.

== Missionary to India ==
Vendrame arrived in Shillong on 23 December 1924. At the start of the World War II in 1939, Vendrame and another 150 Italian missionaries were put in the concentration camp. After the war Vendrame was asked by Louis Mathias to go to Wandiwash, Tamil Nadu. He came back to Shillong in 1951. He was always busy in preaching gospel, helping needy and bringing people back to the church.

== Death ==
Vendrame died in Dibrugarh, Assam, India, on 30 January 1957. On 1 July 2014 the mortal remains of Constantine Vendrame were moved to the Shrine of Sacred Heart of Jesus, Mawlai, Shillong, India.

== Sainthood ==
The process for canonisation is underway for Constantine Vendrame. On 22nd of May, 2026 Pope Leo XIV approved the heroic virtues.

== See also ==
- List of saints of India
