= Mary Help of Christians Cathedral, Shillong =

Cathedral of Mary Help of Christians
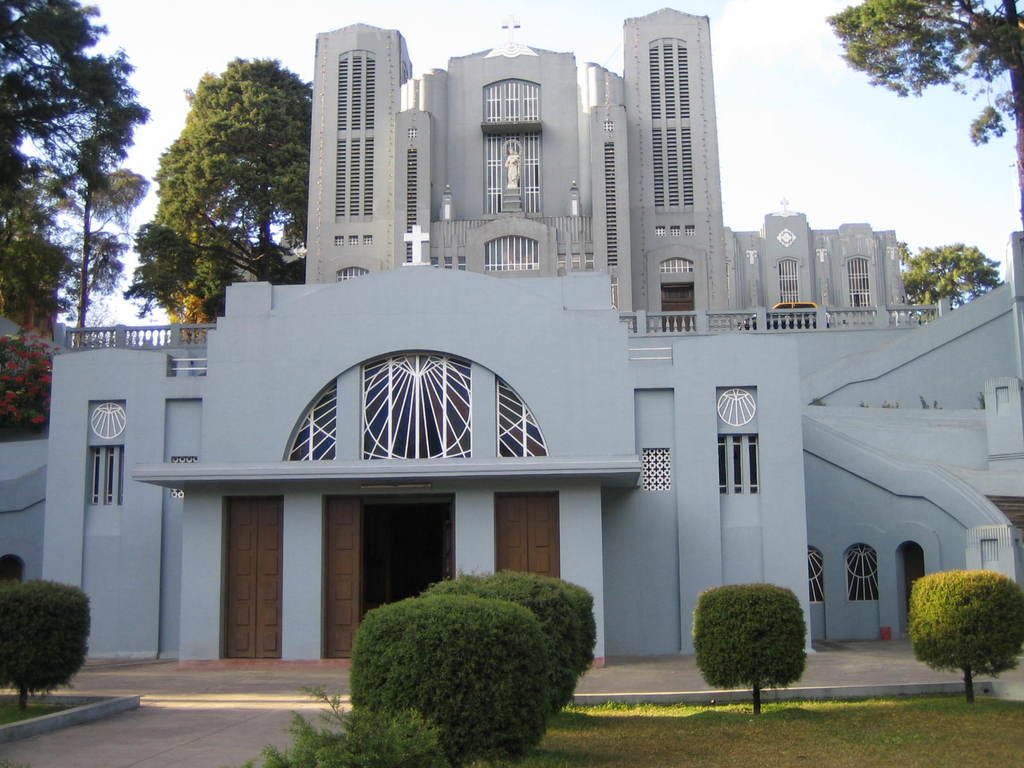
- Cathedral of Mary Help of Christians
- Cathedral of Mary Help of Christians
- 25.568448°N 91.891343°E
- Location: Laitumkhrah, Shillong
- Country: India
- Denomination: Catholic
- Tradition: Latin Rite

History
- Status: Cathedral
- Founded: 1936; 90 years ago
- Dedication: Mary Help of Christians

Architecture
- Functional status: active
- Style: Art Déco

Administration
- Province: Province of Shillong
- Metropolis: Metropolitan Archdiocese of Shillong
- Archdiocese: Metropolitan Archdiocese of Shillong
- Parish: Cathedral Parish, Laitumkhrah

Clergy
- Archbishop: Victor Lyngdoh

The Cathedral of Mary Help of Christians is a cathedral in Shillong, Meghalaya, India. It is the cathedral church of the Roman Catholic Archdiocese of Shillong and serves as the seat of the Metropolitan Archbishop of Shillong. It covers the districts of East Khasi Hills and Ri-Bhoi, in which there are 49 church districts or "Parishes". The Cathedral, built more than 85 years ago, is the principal place of worship of the over 342,169 Catholics of the Shillong Archdiocese.

== History ==
Built in 1913 by the first Catholic missionaries to these hills, the Salvatorians from Germany (of the Society of the Divine Saviour), it was the first Catholic Cathedral Church in what was then the Apostolic Prefecture of Assam. Construction of the new church of Mary Help of Christians began on the same site on 25 October 1936. The earlier 1913 building – the Church of the Divine Saviour – was a wooden structure, which was destroyed in a fire on 10 April 1936. Described as modern Gothic (accurately Art Deco), the Church building plan was approved on 22 August 1936 by the chairman of the Shillong Municipality, who was also the Deputy Commissioner of former United Khasi & Jaintia Hills District, Keith Cantlie. The first stone of the new Church was blessed on 25 October 1936 the feast of Christ the King. The building stands on sand and has no direct connection with the underlying rock; the type of foundation was recommended since the region where Shillong is located is prone to severe earthquakes. The sand on which the structure stands provides elasticity. At the time of building the foundation, trenches were cut from rock and half-filled with sand. Theoretically the Church building in times of earthquakes can rock safely on the shock-absorbing sand. In 1980, the centenary year of the Catholic Church in North East India, the Archbishop, Hubert D’Rosario, declared the Cathedral Church a shrine, duly approved to be a pilgrimage centre. Since then special church services have been held there every Wednesday.

== The building ==
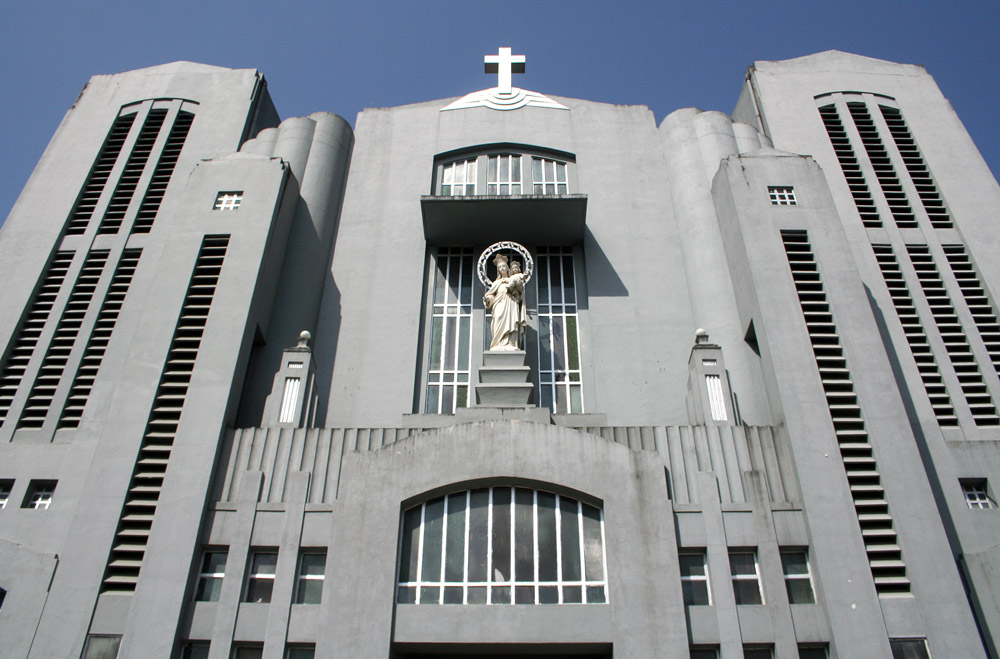
The facade of the cathedral with the statue of Mary Help of Christians

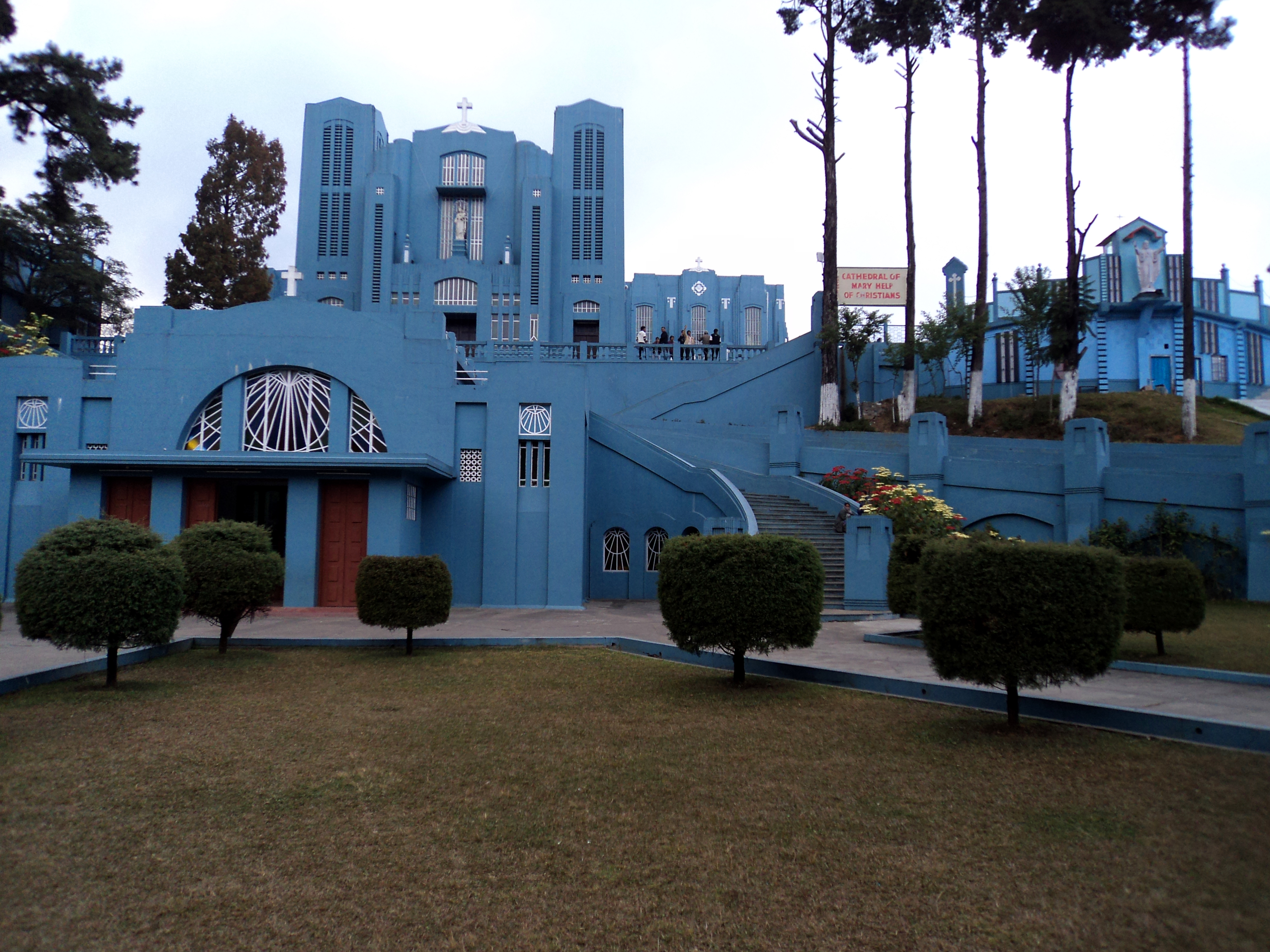
Cathedral of Mary Help of Christians

Located in the Laitumkhrah locality in Shillong, the Cathedral of Mary Help of Christians has high arches and stained glass windows. Directly below, carved out of the hill is the Grotto Church. This Cathedral is named after Mary the mother of Jesus Christ. On the flanks of the inside of the Cathedral Church are another set of 14 Stations of the Cross. Made of terracotta in relief, they depict scenes from the suffering and death of Jesus Christ. These depictions, it is said, earlier adorned the old Cathedral Church. They are reported to have been produced by the Art Institute in Munich, Bavaria, Germany. The inside of the Church also holds several works of church art which portray scenes from Holy Scripture and the life of Saints. There is a set of stained glass windows made in Grenoble, France in 1947. On the left facing the main altar is the grave of the first Archbishop of Shillong, Hubert D'Rosario, SDB., DD. Next to the grave, just in front of the statue of Mary and the Child Jesus, is another altar, where special nine-day devotions are held every month.
