= Louis Mathias =

Catholic bishop of Shillong (1887–1965)

Archbishop Louis Mathias S.D.B.
- Archbishop of Madras and Mylapore (Meliapor)
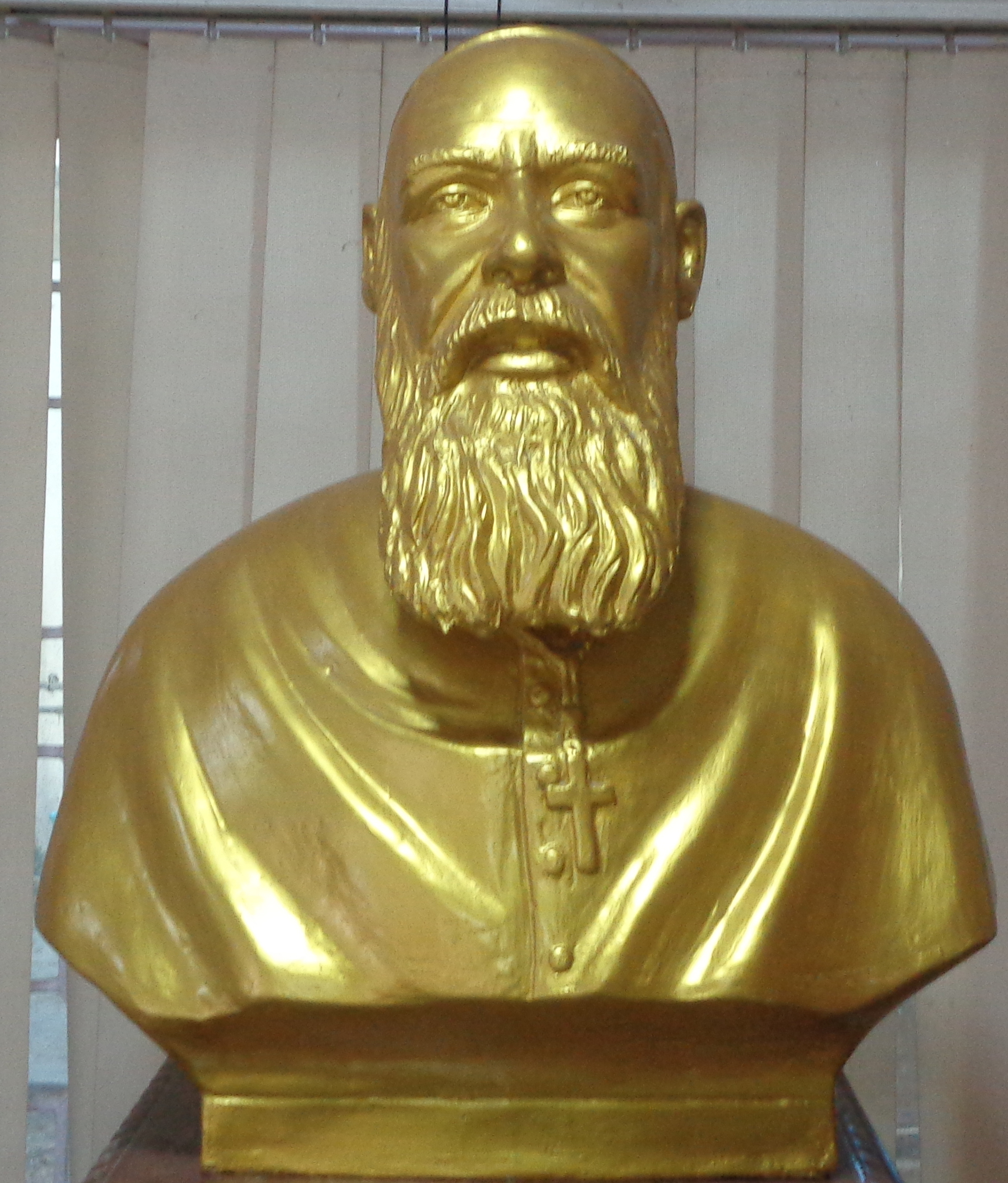
- Bust of Archbishop Louis Mathias at Santhome Museum
- See: Madras and Mylapore (Meliapor)
- Appointed: 25 March 1935
- Installed: 20 July 1935
- Term ended: 3 August 1965
- Predecessor: Eugène Mederlet
- Successor: Anthony Rayappa Arulappa

Orders
- Ordination: 20 July 1913
- Consecration: 10 November 1934 by Ferdinand Périer

Personal details
- Born: Louis Mathias; July 20, 1887 Paris, France
- Died: August 3, 1965 (aged 78) Legnand, Italy
- Buried: San Thome Basilica
- Denomination: Catholic
- Motto: Aude Et Spera (Dare and Hope)
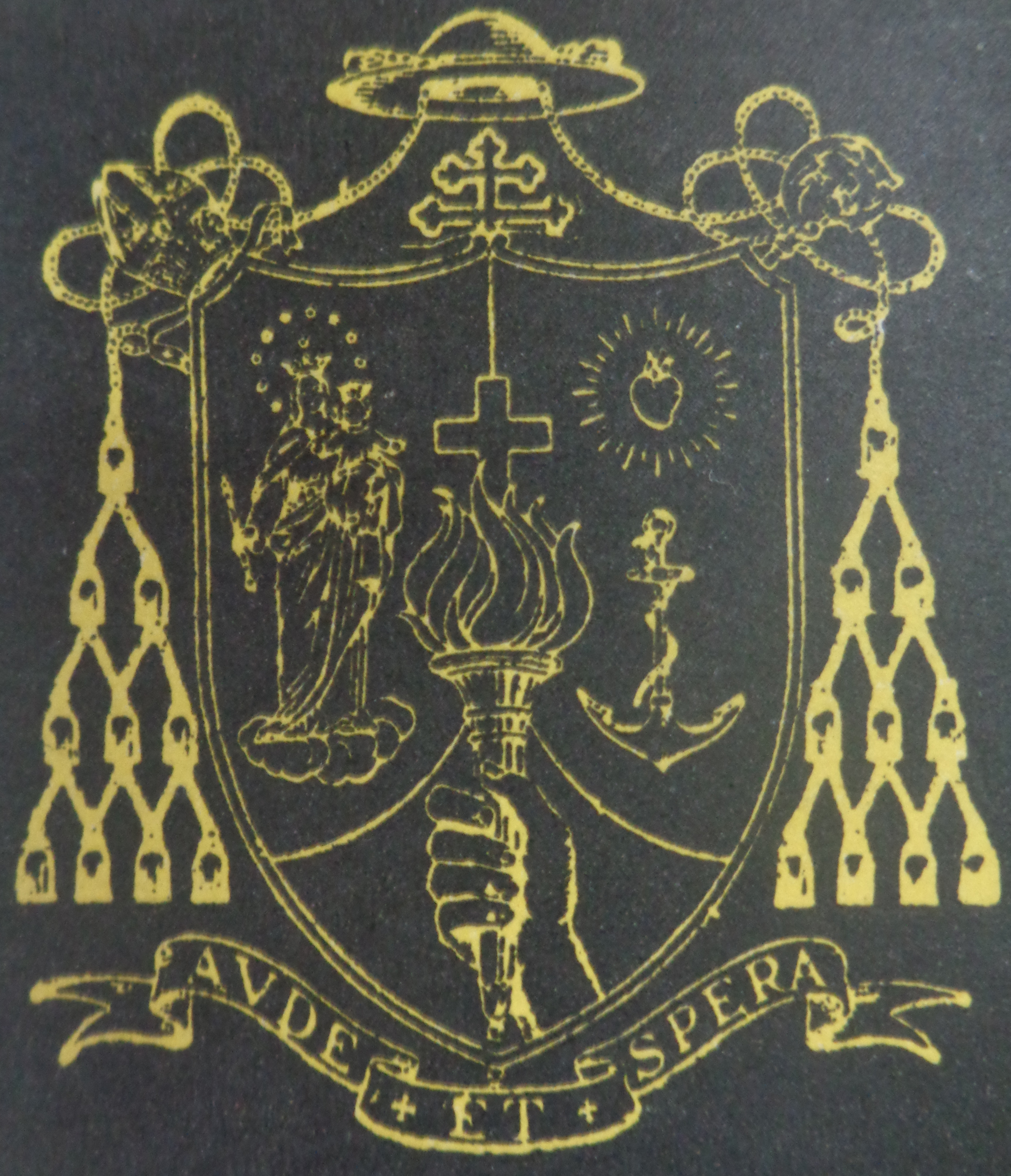
- Coat of arms: Louis Mathias's coat of arms

Ordination history of Louis Mathias
History
Episcopal consecration
- Principal consecrator: Ferdinand Périer
- Co-consecrators: Alfred-Arthur Le Pailleur Giovanni Battista Anselmo
Episcopal succession
Bishops consecrated by Louis Mathias as principal consecrator
- Joseph-Alphonse Baud: 1942
- Francis Arthur Carvalho: 1953
- Pablo Mariaselvam: 1953
- Rajarethinam Arokiasamy Sundaram: 1953
- David Maryanayagam Swamidoss Pillat: 1956

Louis Mathias (born 20 July 1887, Paris, died 3 August 1965, Legnano, Italy) was the first Catholic bishop of Shillong who later became the Archbishop of the Roman Catholic Archdiocese of Madras and Mylapore (1935–1952). He belonged to Salesian congregation and came as a missionary to India.

== Missionary to India ==
Mathias was head of the Salesian missionary expedition to Assam. Leaving Italy in 1921, he reached Shillong in January 1922. On 12 December 1922 he was nominated Prefect Apostolic of Assam, Bhutan and Manipur. He was also the first Salesian Provincial of India, an office that he held until 1934. On 10 November 1934, he was nominated as the first bishop of the new diocese of Shillong.

It was Mathias who initiated the idea of a Salesian presence in Bombay (Mumbai). The idea was put to him in a letter from an influential Catholic of Bombay, Mr. F.A.C. Rebello, dt. 29 March 1923. The decision was taken in 1927, and the Salesians took over the Immaculate Conception School for Goan boys at Tardeo in 1928. This school was under the Padroado bishop of Daman. Since the Propaganda Archdiocese of Bombay had objected to the entry of the Salesians, this was how Msgr. Mathias circumvented the opposition.

== Archbishop of Madras and Mylapore ==
Mathias was appointed to the see of Madras in 1935. When this archdiocese was united to the former Propaganda diocese of Mylapore, Mathias became the first Archbishop of Madras-Mylapore. He established the Poonamallee Seminary for the archdiocese and for other neighbouring dioceses. He also established the Catholic Centre to administer the more than 150 institutions of the archdiocese. He went on to become one of the leading bishops in India. He was a founding member of the Catholic Bishops' Conference of India (CBCI), and was given charge of Catholic Action and the Press. Together with Archbishop Perier of Calcutta, he was the leading light of the CBCI for many years. His was the idea of setting up the first Catholic medical school, the St. John's Medical College, Bangalore. He was also responsible for initiating a nationwide Catholic magazine, The New Leader (earlier The Catholic Leader), and a review for the clergy in India, The Clergy Monthly, now Vidyajyoti: Journal of Theological Reflection. J. Thekkedath calls Mathias the greatest Salesian of the 20th century in India.

== Gallery ==
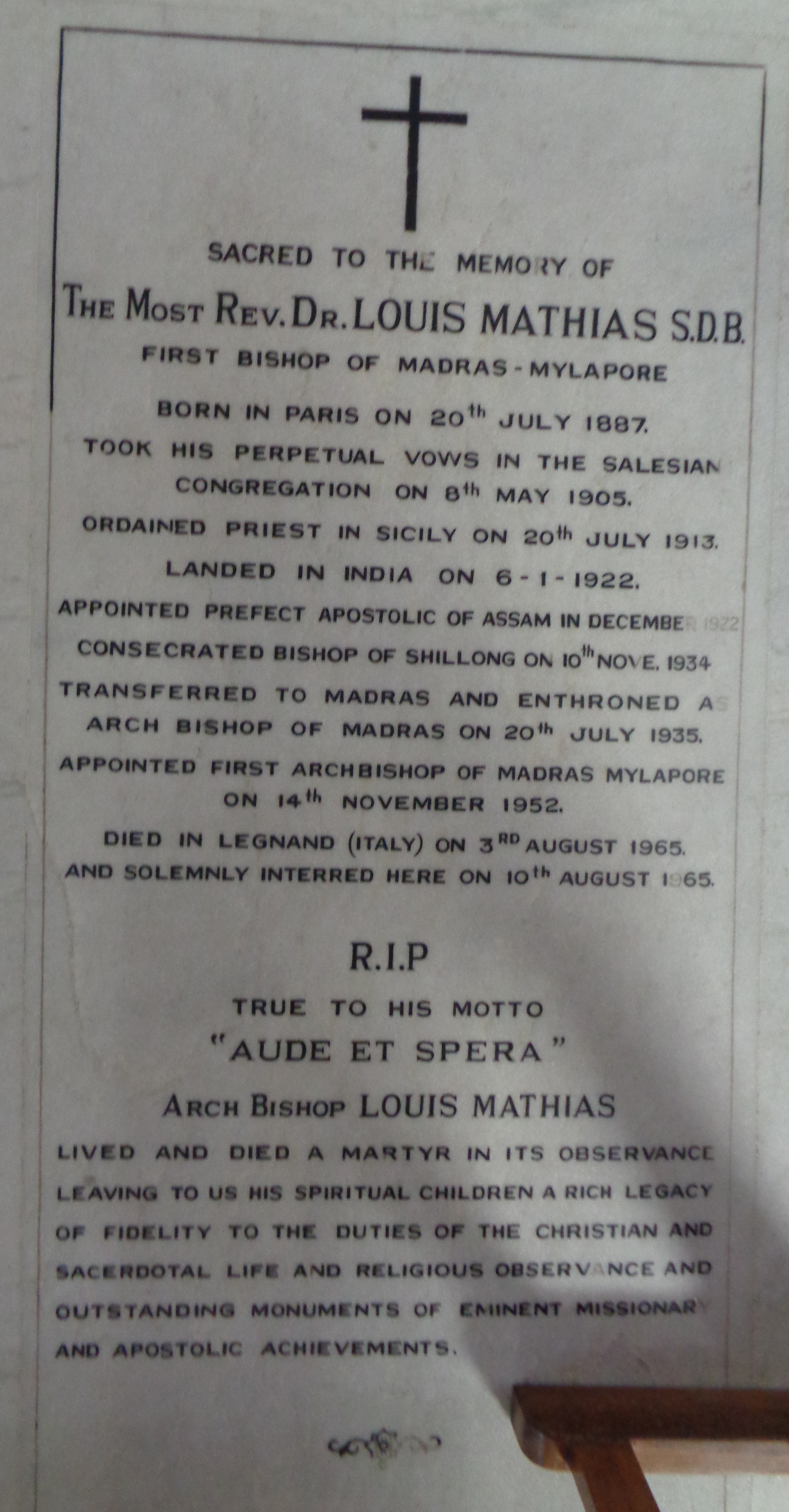
Tomb of Archbishop Louis Mathias at St. Thomas Cathedral Basilica, Chennai

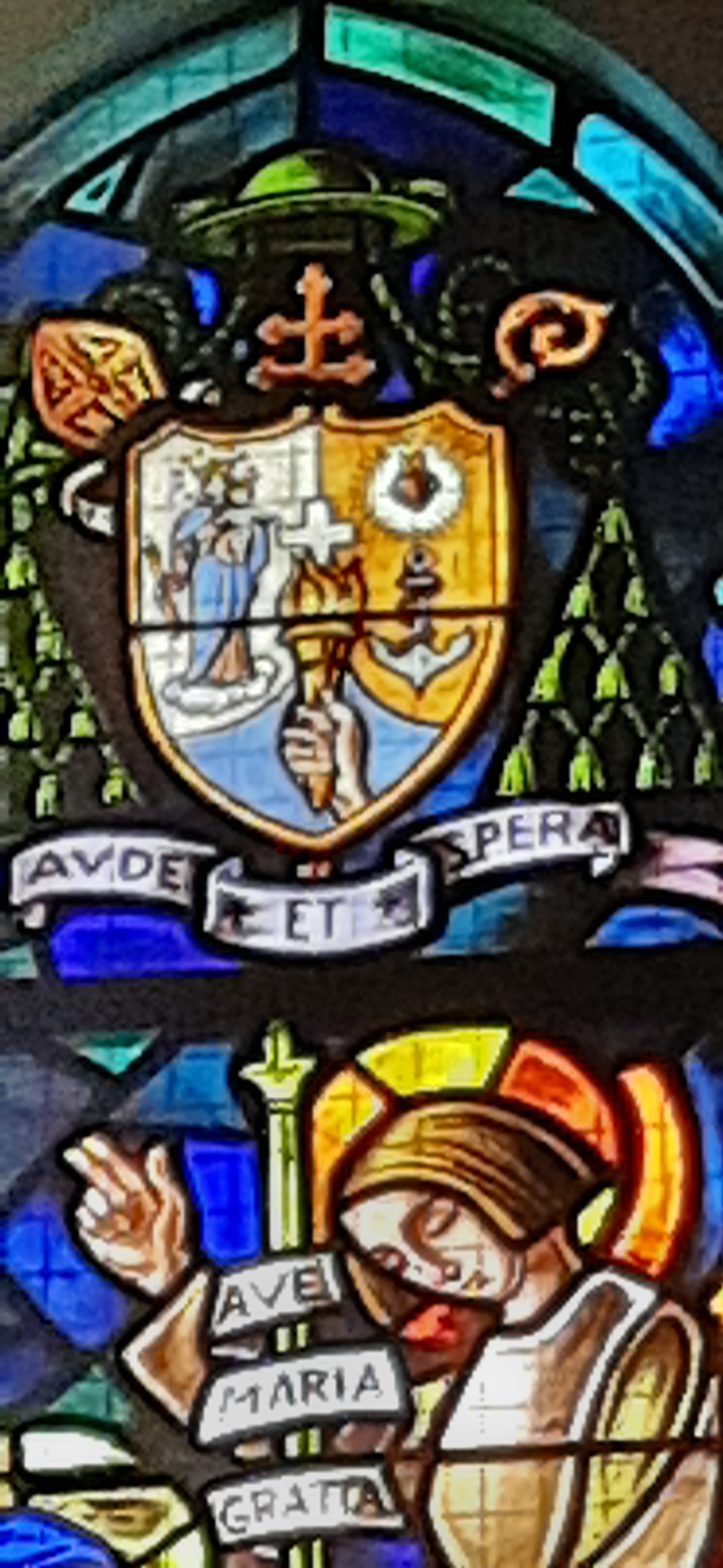
Coat of Arms of Archbishop Louis Mathias in the Stained glass window of Votive Shrine Kilpauk

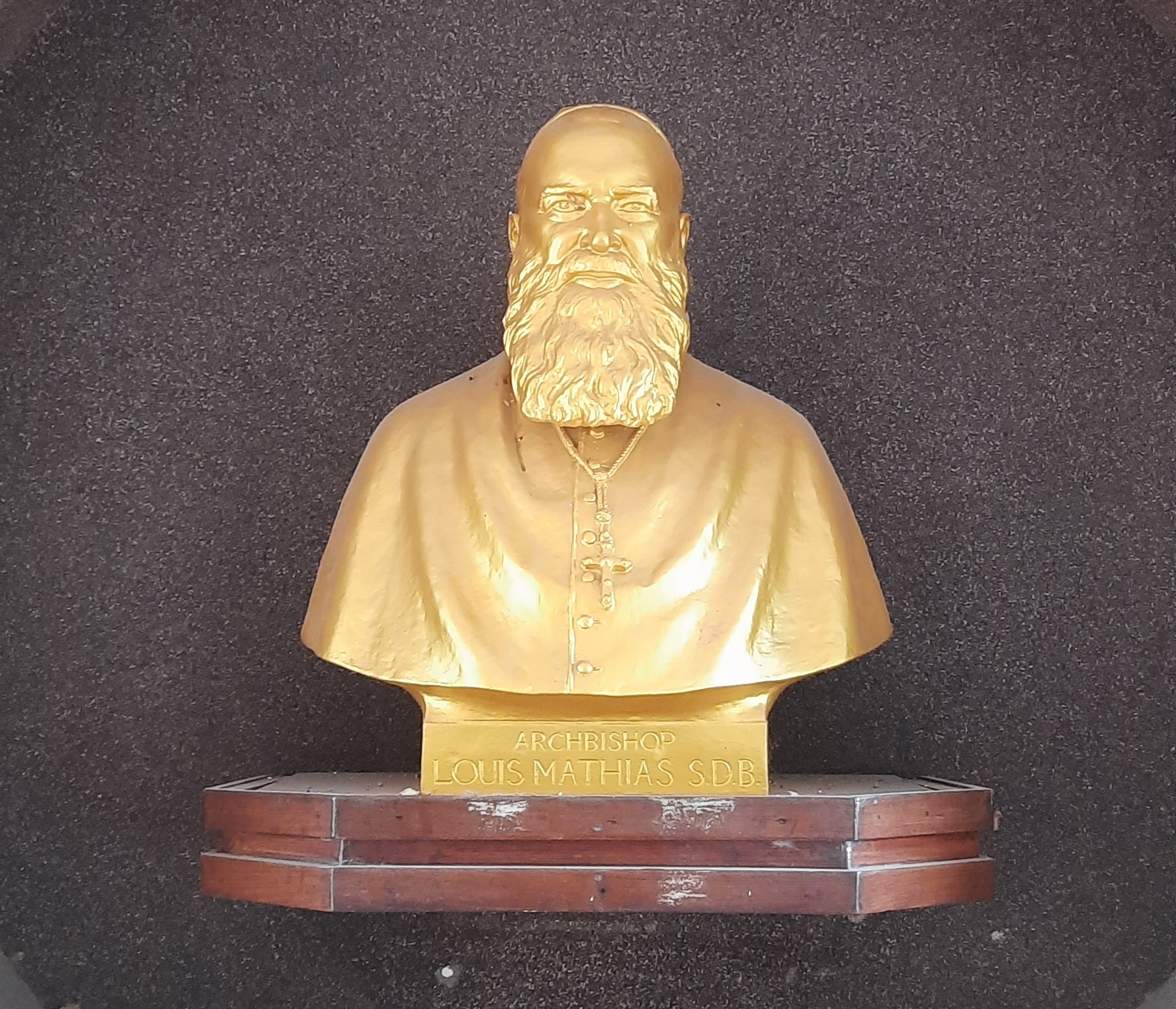
Bust of Archbishop Louis Mathias at Sacred Heart Seminary, Poonamallee

== Bibliography ==
=== Primary ===
- Quarant'anni di Missione in India. Memorie di Sua Eccellenza Monsignor Luigi Mathias. Volume I: In Assam 1921–1935. Torino: Elle Di Ci, 1965.

=== Secondary ===
- "Archbishop Louis Mathias." The Memory of the Salesian Province of Bombay 1928-1998. Ed. Peter Gonsalves (Matunga, Bombay: Province Information Office, Don Bosco Provincial House, 1998) 56.
- Paviotti, O. The Work of His Hands: The Story of the Archdiocese of Shillong-Guwahati 1934-1984. Shillong, 1987.
- Pianazzi, A. Ardisci e Spera. Vita del Vescovo Missionario Luigi Mathias. Roma: LAS, 1975.
- Pianazzi, A. Dare and Hope. Life of the Salesian Missionary Bishop Archbishop Louis Mathias, SDB. Tr. Hugh McGlinchey, SDB. Madras: Salesian Publications, 1979.
- Pianazzi, A. Don Bosco nell'Assam. La storia di una missione. Torino: Elle Di Ci, 1983.
- Souvenir of the Silver Jubilee of the Most Rev. Louis Mathias. Madras, 1960.
- Casti, Giuseppe. La missione dell'Assam dall'arrivo dei Padri Salesiani alla sua elevazione a diocesi. 1922–1934. Dissertation submitted to the Faculty of Theology of the Pontifical Urban University, Roma, 1979.
- A Missionary who Dared and Hoped: Archbishop Louis Mathias (1887-1965). Madras: Citadel, 1972.
- Golden Jubilee Souvenir: The Salesians of Don Bosco in India: 1922-1972. Shillong, 1972.
- Kottupallil, George. "A Historical Survey of the Catholic Church in Northeast India from 1627 to 1969." Indian Missiological Review 12 (1990) 25–62.
- La missione Salesiana di San Giovanni Bosco, Tezpur, Assam, Giubileo d'Oro, 1888-1938. Gauhati, 1938.
- Thekkedath, Joseph. A History of the Salesians of Don Bosco in India: from the beginning up to 1951-52. vols. 1 and 2. Bangalore: Kristu Jyoti Publications, 2005. Section II: Salesians in North-East India under the Leadership of Mgr Louis Mathias (1922–35). Also ch. 15: The Archdiocese of Madras under Mgr Mathias (1935–43); ch. 23: The Archdiocese of Madras under Mgr Mathias (1943–52); and critical estimate of Mgr Mathias, 2:1368-75.
- Pianazzi, Archimede. "Salesiani della LIII Spedizione. 1921. Mons. Luigi Mathias." Profili di Missionari: Salesiani e Figlie di Maria Ausiliatrice. Ed. Eugenio Valentini. Rome: LAS, 1975. 452–459.
