= Victor Lyngdoh =

Indian bishop

The Most Reverend Victor Lyngdoh
- Metropolitan Archbishop of Shillong
- Archdiocese: Shillong
- Appointed: 28 December 2020
- Predecessor: Dominic Jala
- Successor: Incumbent
- Other post: Chairman of the Bible Commission in North East Bishops council of India
- Previous posts: Bishop of Jowai, Bishop of Nongstoin

Orders
- Ordination: 25 January 1987
- Consecration: 2 April 2006 by Pedro López Quintana

Personal details
- Born: 14 January 1956 (age 70) Wahlang, Meghalaya, India
- Denomination: Roman Catholic
- Motto: FOR LIFE, I OBEY GOD

Victor Lyngdoh is, since 2020, the Metropolitan Archbishop of the Roman Catholic Archdiocese of Shillong. He served as the Bishop of the Roman Catholic Diocese of Jowai, India, until December 2020.

== Early life ==
Victor was born in Wahlang, Meghalaya, India on 14 January 1956.

== Priesthood ==
He was ordained a Catholic priest on 25 January 1987.

== Episcopate ==
He was appointed Bishop of Nongstoin, India on 28 January 2006 and ordained on 2 April 2006. Pope Francis appointed Lyngdoh Bishop of Jowai on 15 October 2016 and he was installed on 20 November 2016. He also chairs the Bible Commission in North East Bishops council of India.

Lyngdoh was appointed Metropolitan Archbishop of the Roman Catholic Archdiocese of Shillong on 28 December 2020.
