= Ward Lake =

Ward Lake may refer to the following bodies of water:

== Lakes ==
In the United States

- Ward Lake (Alaska)
- Ward Lake (Florida)
- Ward Lake (McLeod and Sibley counties, Minnesota)
- Ward Lake (Thurston County, Washington)

Elsewhere

- Ward Lake (Antarctica)
- Ward Lake (Vancouver Island), Canada
- Ward's Lake (Shillong), Meghalaya, India
