= Elephant Falls =

Waterfall in Shillong, Meghalaya, India

Nuranang Falls
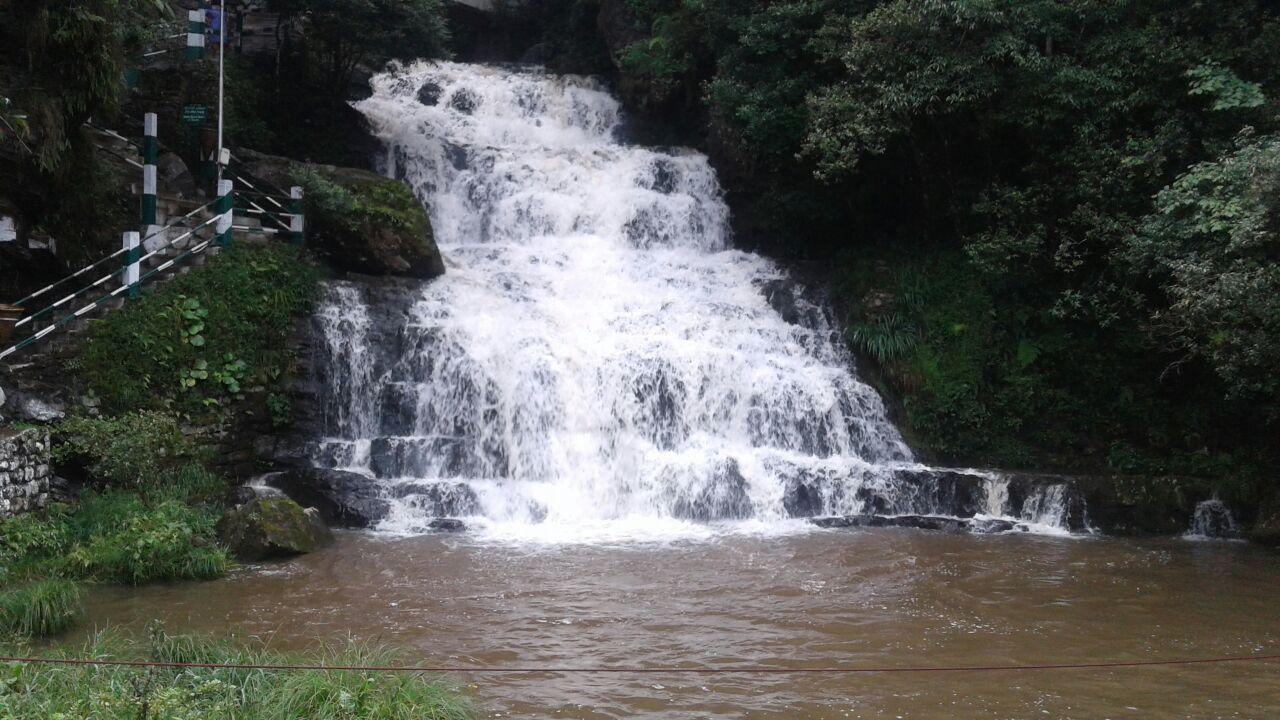
- Elephant Falls
- Interactive map of Nuranang Falls
- Location: Shillong, Meghalaya, India
- Coordinates: 25°32′16″N 91°49′19″E
- Type: curtain
- Number of drops: 1
- Watercourse: Nuranang Chu

The Elephant Falls are a two-tier waterfall in Shillong, Meghalaya, India. The mountain stream descends through two successive falls set in dells of fern-covered rocks.

== History ==
The original Khasi name for the falls is Ka Kshaid Lai Pateng Khohsiew, which translates to "the three-step waterfall". This name is still used locally. The modern name of "Elephant Falls" is explained by a signboard near the waterfall. The name originated in the British era when the Englishmen spotted a giant rock that looked like an elephant near the fall. However, this rock was destroyed in the 1897 due to an earthquake.

== Description ==
The first fall of Elephant Falls is an example of a horsetail-punchbowl waterfall. The first fall is very broad and is hidden among trees. The second fall however, is quite domesticated and in the winters (and drier months) looks inconsequential. The third fall is the tallest and comes into view suddenly and looks most spectacular with crystal clear water falling over sharp rocks of myriad shapes.

The sides of the waterfall are flanked by lush greenery and are rich in ferns.

== Location ==
Elephant Falls is situated at the outskirts of the main city of Shillong in the East Khasi Hills District, Upper Shillong. It is almost 12 km away from the Shillong city center. It is opposite Mattilang Park in Laitmynsaw.

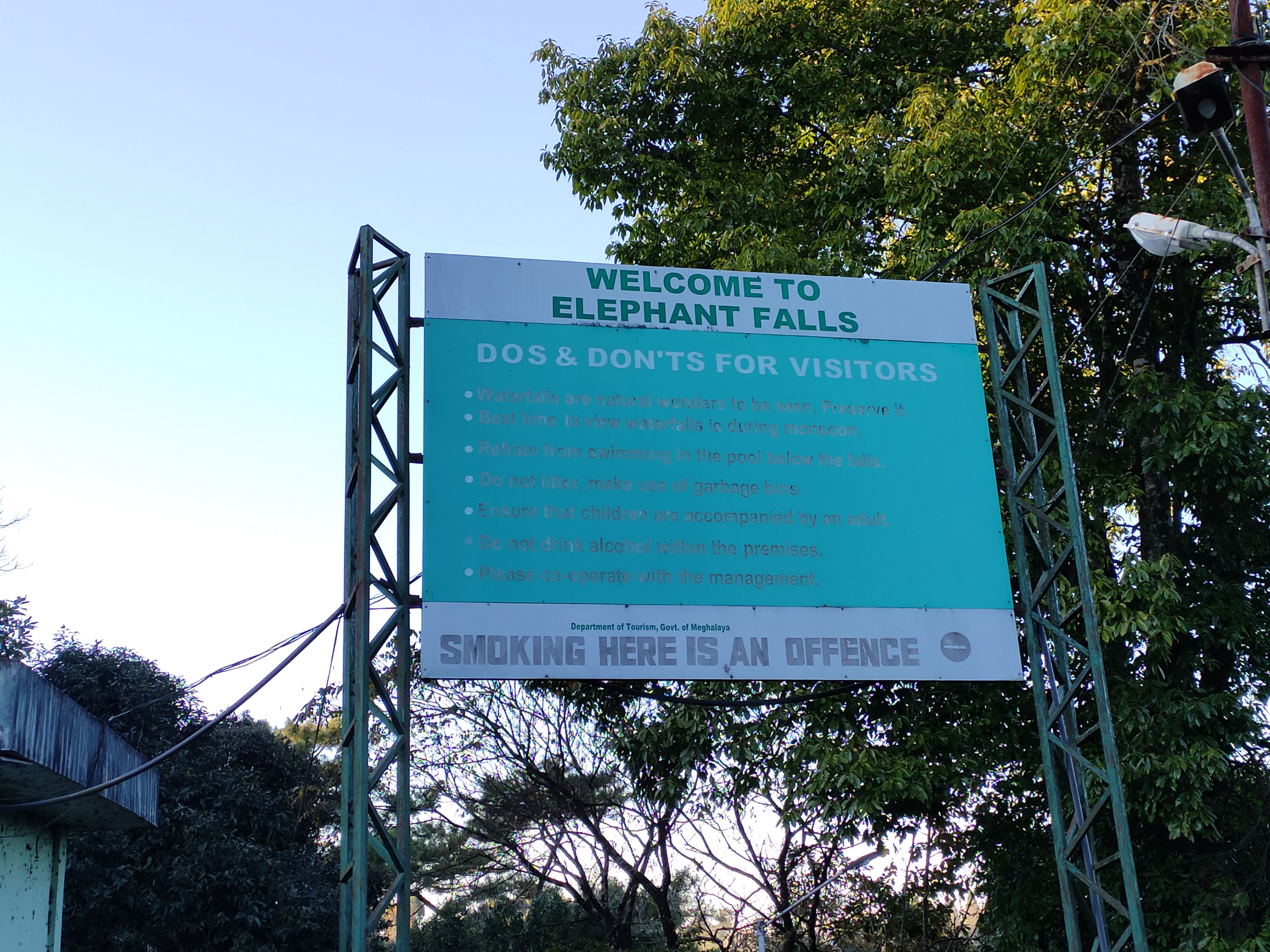
Signboard at the gate of Elephant Falls

A small signboard quite close to the Shillong Peak marks a small road that turns off to the edge of the mountain, leading to the falls.

From the gate, there is a steep, slippery flight of stairs to navigate each level of the fall with the first and second level facilitated with benches to rest and relax.

A ticket costing 20 INR is required to view the fall with an additional charge of 20 INR for permission to bring a camera.

== Gallery ==
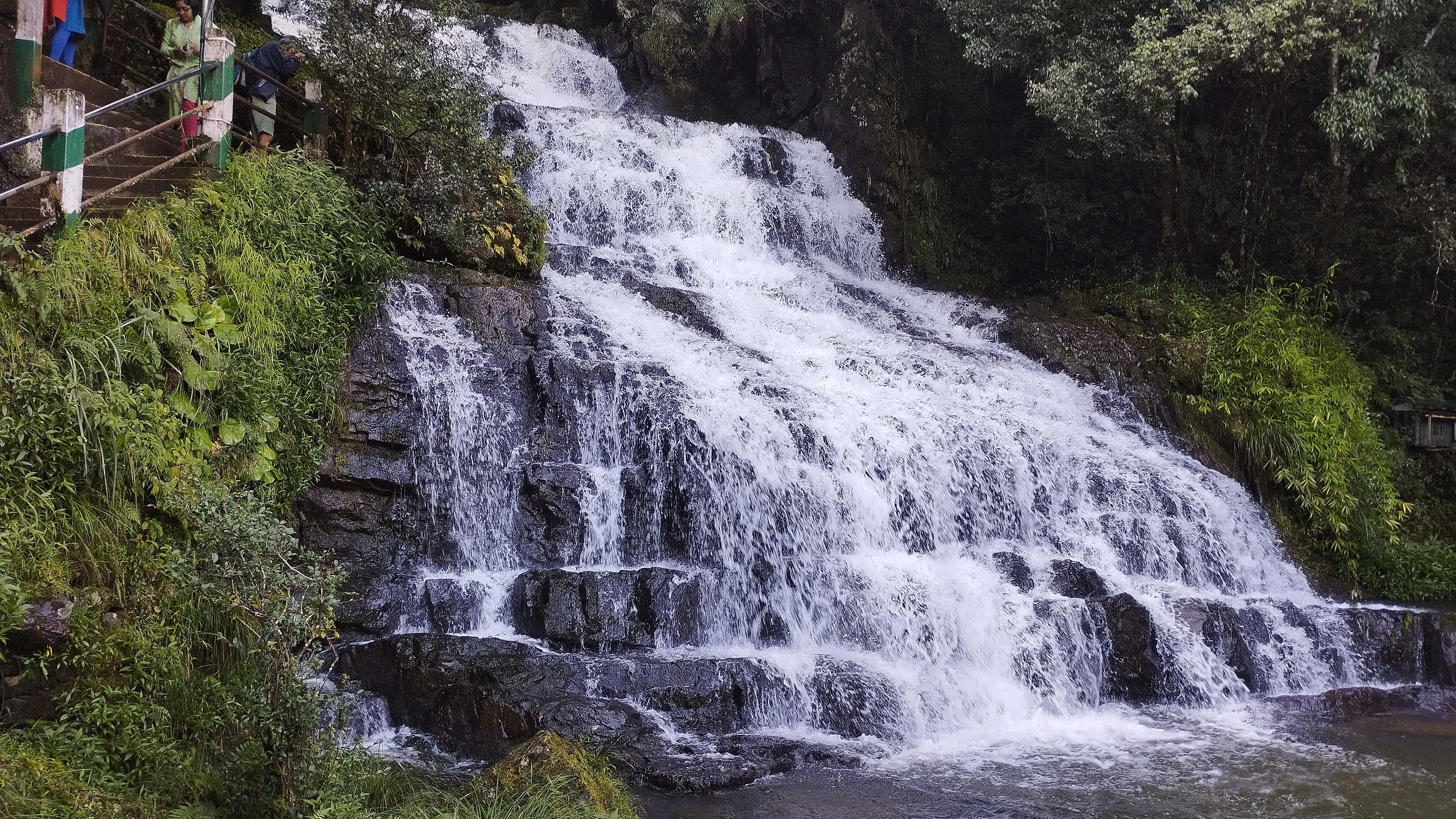
Elephant Falls at Shillong located in the East Khasi Hills

== See also ==
- List of waterfalls
- List of waterfalls in India
