= Shillong =

City and state capital of Meghalaya, India

- City
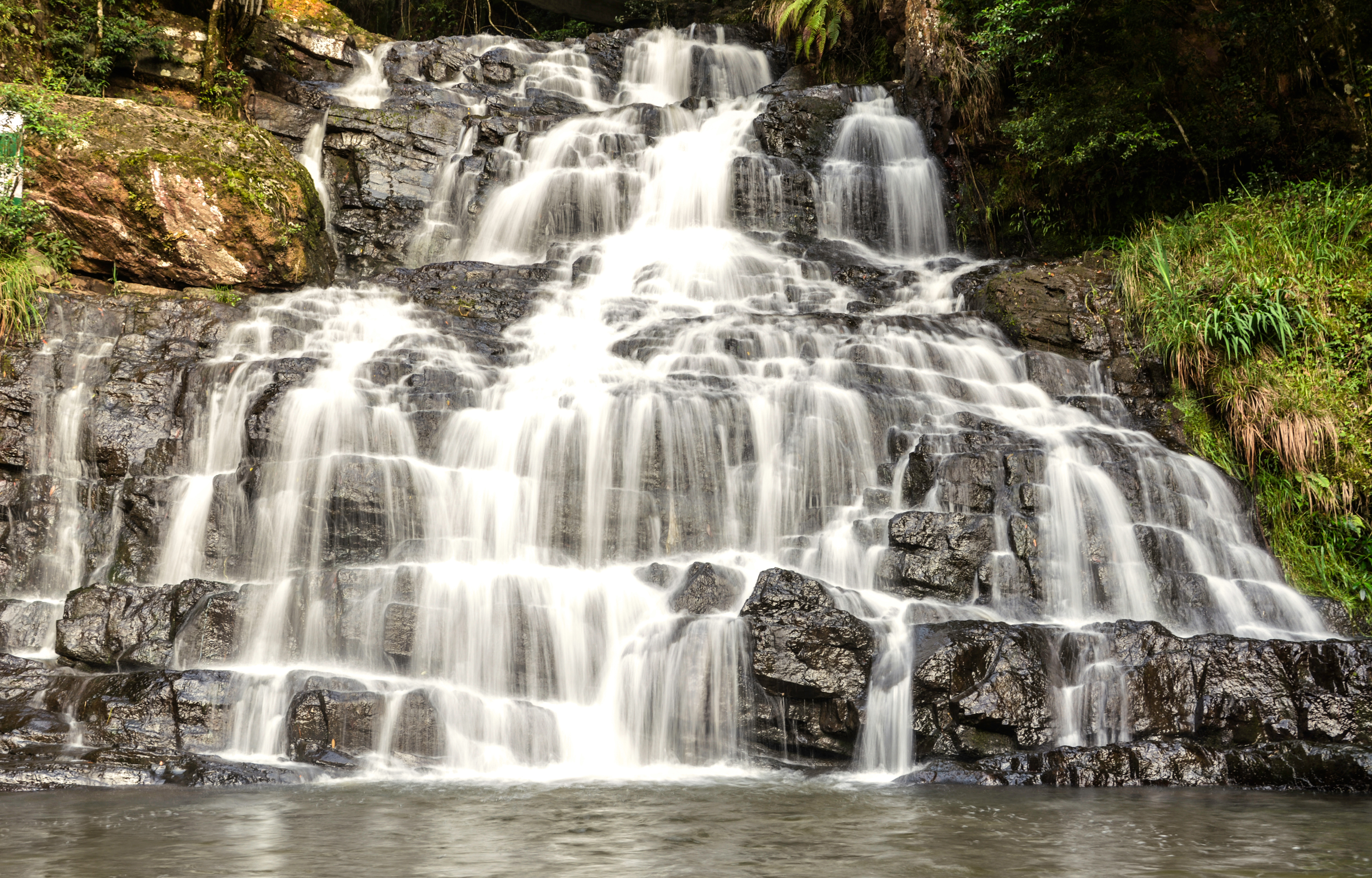
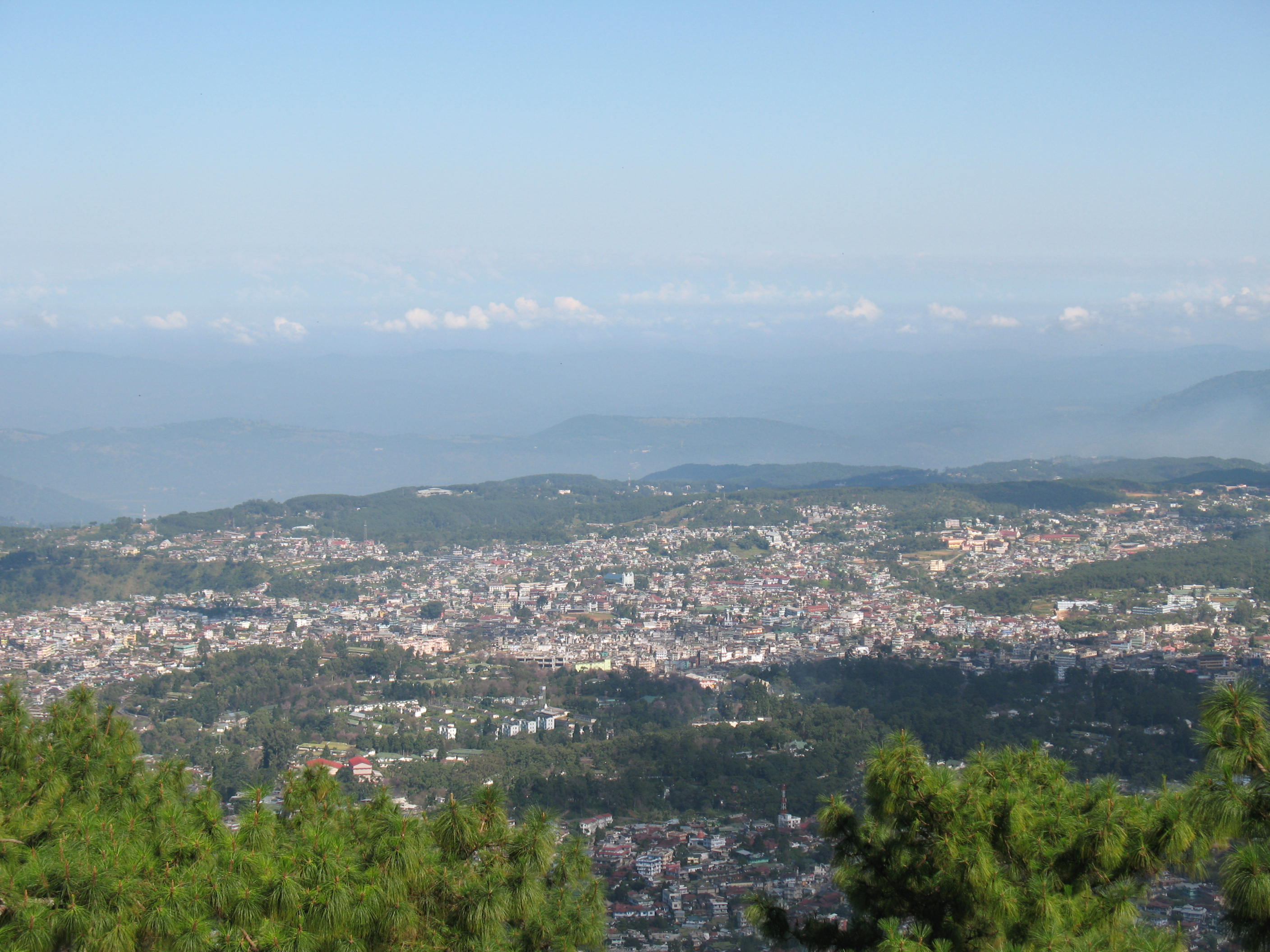
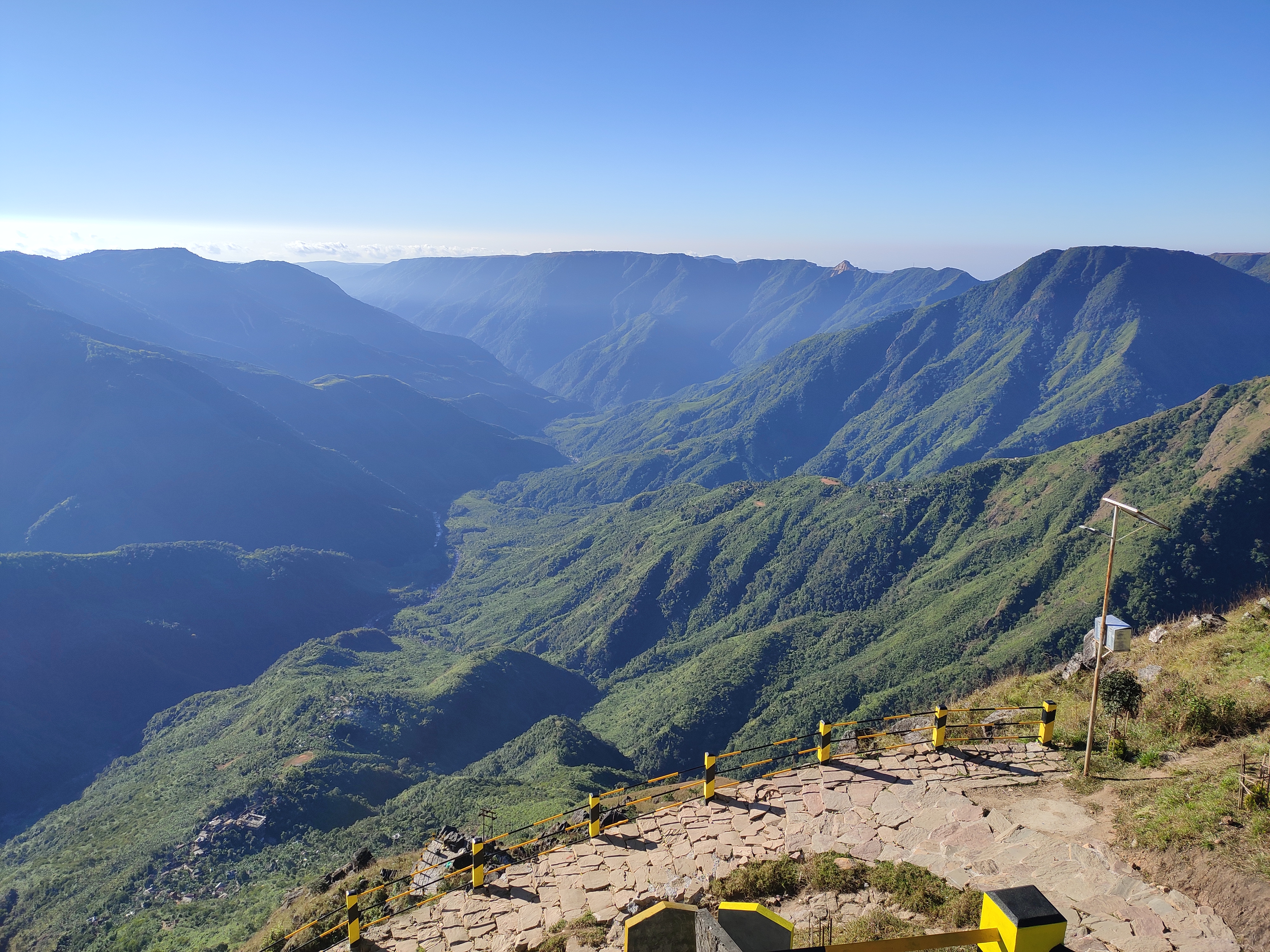
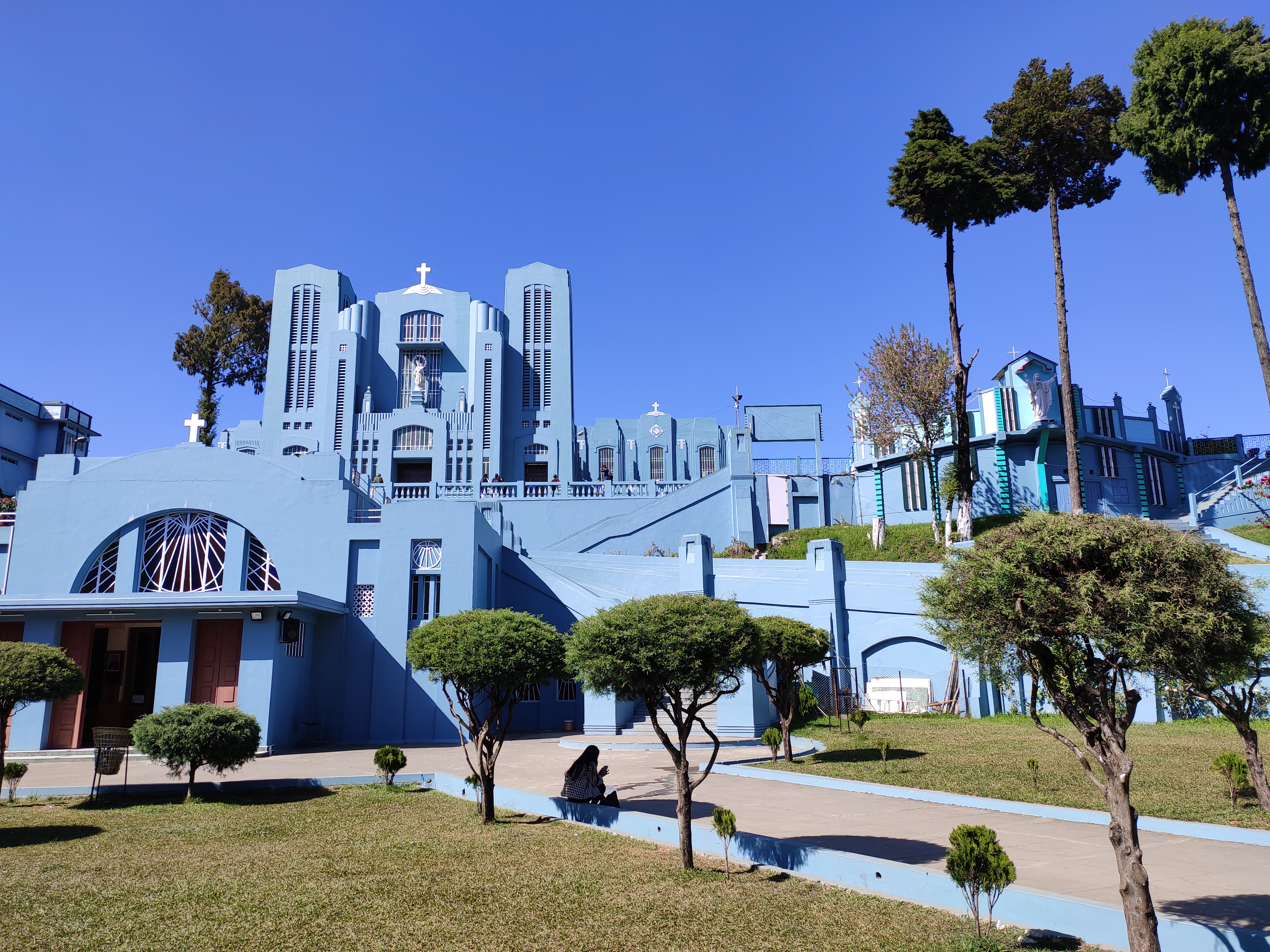
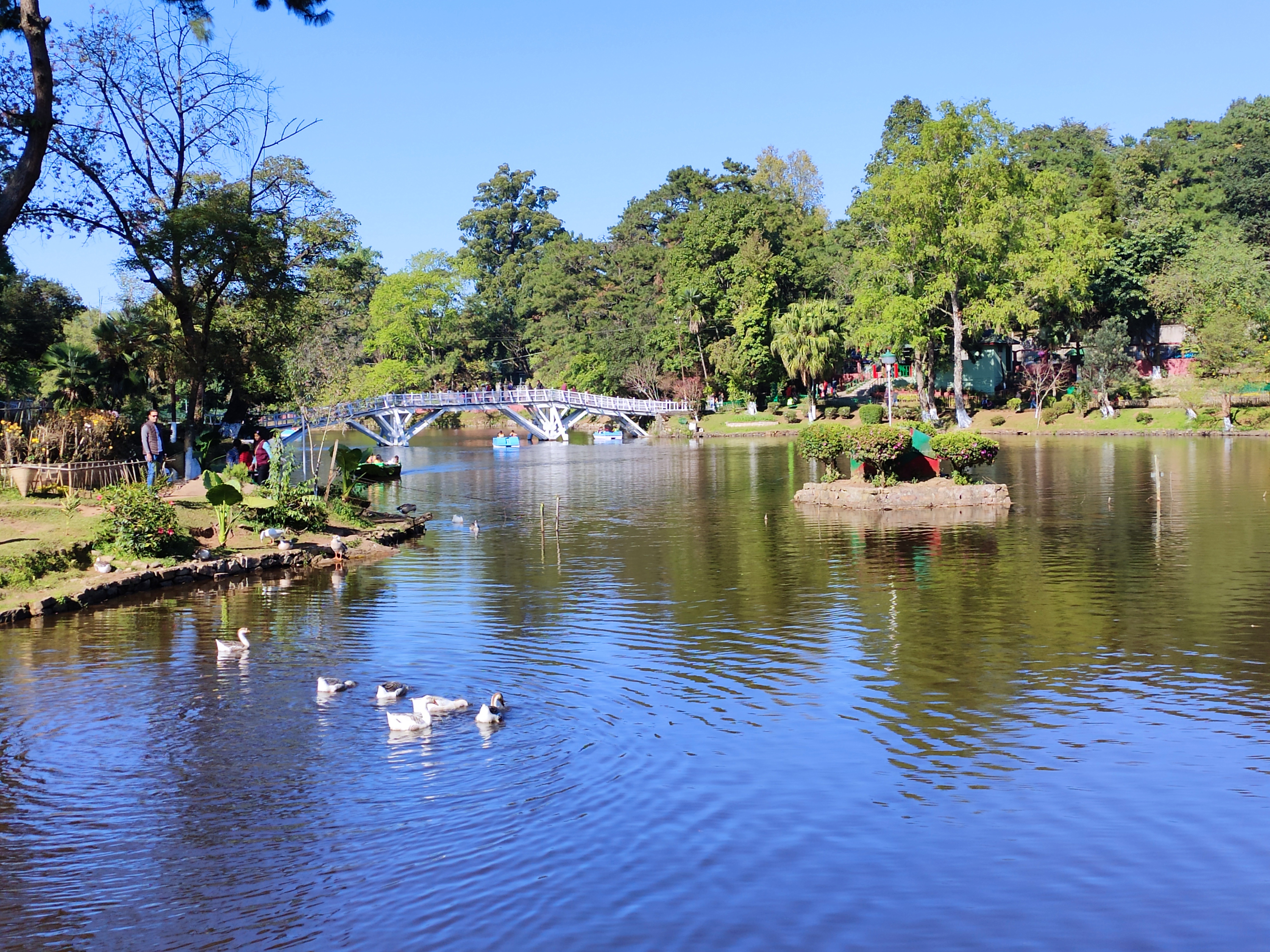
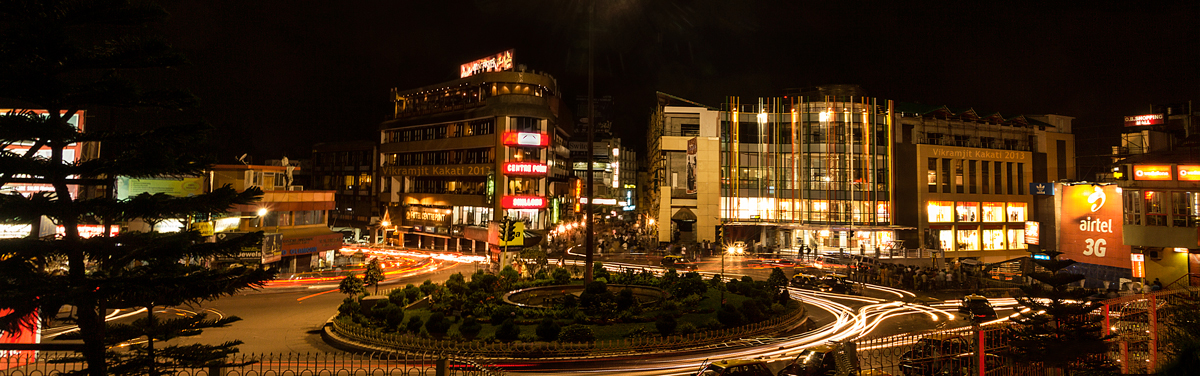
- Clockwise from top left to right: Elephant Falls, Laitlum Canyon, Ward's Lake, Panorama of Police Bazar in Shillong, The Cathedral of Mary Help of Christians, A view of Shillong
- Nickname: Scotland of the East
- Location of Shillong in Meghalaya Shillong (India)
- Coordinates: 25°34′56″N 91°53′40″E
- Country: India
- State: Meghalaya
- District: East Khasi Hills
- Named for: Lei Shyllong (Deity)

Government
  - Body: Shillong Municipal Board
  - Director: P.K. Boro

Area
  - City: 64.36 km^{2} (24.85 sq mi)
- Elevation: 1,495–1,965 m (4,905–6,447 ft)

Population (2011)
  - City: 143,229
  - Density: 2,225/km^{2} (5,764/sq mi)
  - Metro: 354,759
- Demonym(s): Shillongite and Nong-Shillong/Nongsor

Language
  - Official: English
  - Associate official: Khasi, Garo
- Time zone: UTC+5:30 (IST)
- PIN: 793 001 – 793 102
- Telephone code: 0364
- Vehicle registration: ML-05
- Climate: Cwb
- Website: eastkhasihills.gov.in

Shillong (English: /ʃɪˈlɒŋ/, Khasi: [ʃɨlːɔːŋ]), the capital of Meghalaya, India, is a hill station and the headquarters of the East Khasi Hills district. It is the 330th most populous city in India, with a population of 143,229 according to the 2011 census. The rolling hills around the town reminded the British of Scotland. Hence, they referred to it as the "Scotland of the East".

Shillong has steadily grown in size since it was designated the civil station of the Khasi and Jaintia Hills by the British in 1864. In 1874, with the formation of Assam as the Chief Commissioner's Province, Shillong was chosen as the headquarters of the new administration due to its convenient location between the Brahmaputra and Surma valleys. Another reason was that the climate of Shillong was much cooler than that of tropical India. Shillong remained the capital of undivided Assam until the creation of the new state of Meghalaya on 21 January 1972, when Shillong became the Meghalaya's capital, and Assam moved its capital to Dispur in Guwahati.

== Etymology ==
Shillong derives its name from Lei Shyllong, a powerful deity believed to reside on the Shillong Peak, which overlooks the city.

== History ==
Shillong was the capital of composite Assam during the British regime and for 25 years in independent India until a separate State of Meghalaya was formed in 1972. David Scott, the British civil servant of the East India Company, was the agent of the governor-general for North East Frontier.

During the First Anglo-Burmese War, the British authorities felt the need for a road to connect Sylhet and Assam. The route was to traverse across the Khasi and Jaintia Hills. David Scott overcame the difficulties his administration faced due to opposition from the Khasi Syiems, their chiefs, and the people. Impressed by the favorable cool climate of Khasi Hills, they negotiated with the Syiem of Sohra in 1829 for a sanatorium for the British. It was then that the consolidation of British interests in the Khasi-Jaintia Hills began.

In early 1829, a Khasis confederation mounted an uprising against British occupation. But by January 1833, their leader, Tirot Sing, surrendered to David Scott and was detained in Dacca (present-day Dhaka). A political agent was posted in Sohra, also known as Cherrapunjee.

But the British did not like the climate and facilities of Sohra, and they moved to Shillong. "Ïewduh" is the biggest market in Shillong. The name "Shillong" was later adopted because the new town was located below Shillong Peak.

In 1874, a separate Chief Commissionership was formed with Shillong as the seat of administration. The new administration included Sylhet, which is now part of Bangladesh. Also included in the Chief Commissionership were the Naga Hills (present-day Nagaland), the Lushai Hills (present-day Mizoram), and the Khasi, Jaintia, and Garo Hills.

The Shillong Municipal Board dates back to 1878, when a proclamation was issued that constituted Shillong and its suburbs, including the villages of Mawkhar and Laban, as a station under the Bengal Municipal Act of 1876. The inclusion of the villages of Mawkhar (S.E. Mawkhar, Jaiaw, and part of Jhalupara and Mawprem) and Laban (Lumparing, Madan Llaban, Kench's Trace, and Rilbong) within the Municipality of Shillong was agreed to by Haiñ Manik Syiem of Mylliem under the agreement dated 15 November 1878. But there is no trace of Shillong in the British-era maps dating back from 1878 to 1900.

The great earthquake of 12 June 1897, of moment magnitude 8.1, killed 27 people from Shillong and destroyed much of the town.

== Geography ==
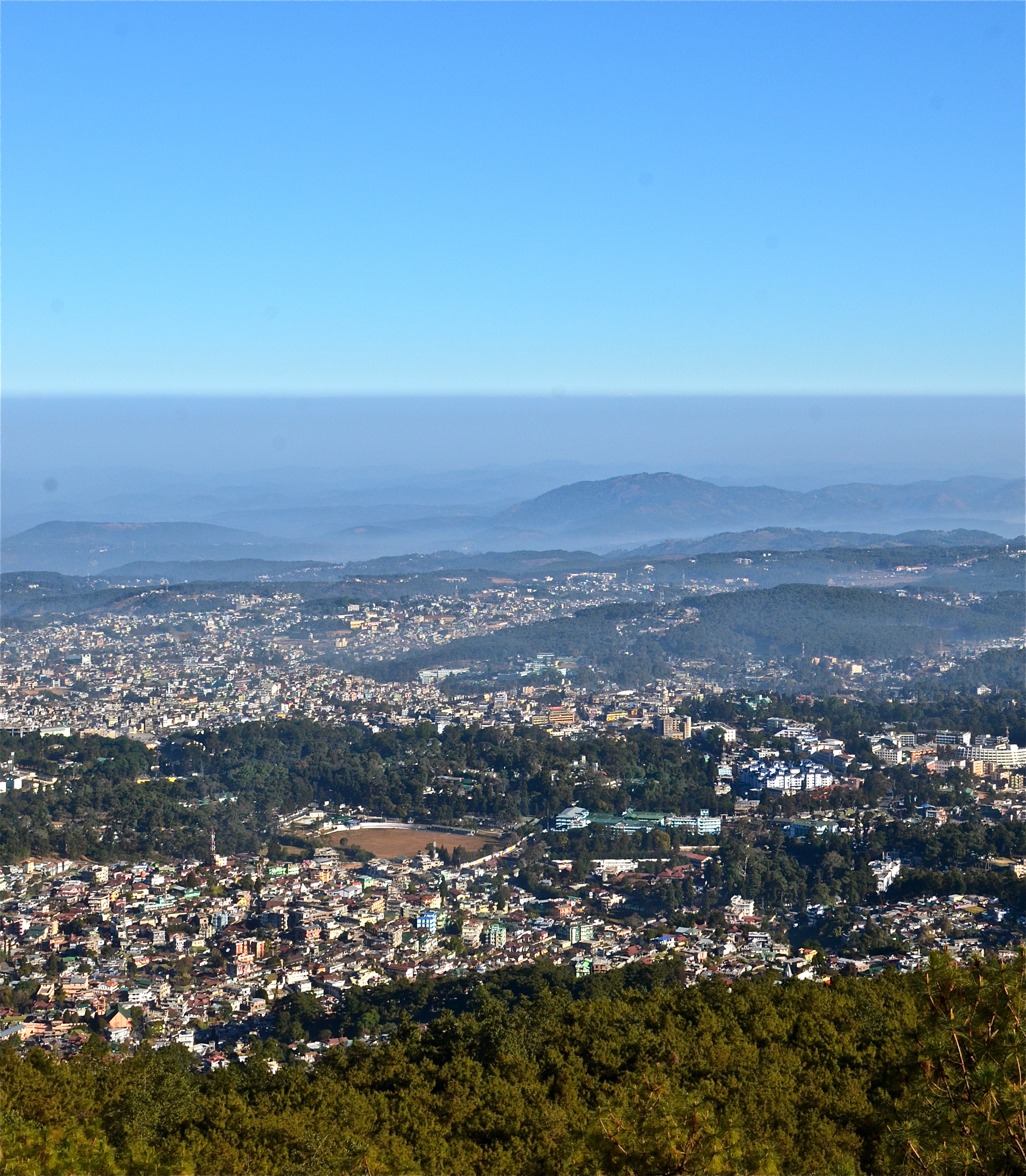
Aerial view of Shillong

Shillong is at 25.57°N 91.88°E. It lies on the Shillong Plateau, the only major uplifted structure in the northern Indian shield. The city lies in the center of the plateau and is surrounded by hills, three of which are revered in Khasi tradition: Lum Sohpetbneng, Lum Diengiei, and Lum Shyllong.

Shillong is just 100 km (62 mi) from Guwahati, accessible by road along NH 40. The journey is of about 2 hours and 30 minutes through lush green hills and the Umiam Lake in between.

=== Smart Cities Mission ===
Shillong has been selected as the 100th city to receive funding under the center's flagship "Smart Cities Mission" Atal Mission for Rejuvenation and Urban Transformation (AMRUT). In January 2016, 20 cities were announced under the Smart Cities Mission, followed by 13 in May 2016, 27 in September 2016, 30 in June 2017, nine in January 2018, and one in June 2018. The total proposed investment in the 100 cities finally selected under the Smart Cities Mission would be ₹ 2,050,180 million. Under the scheme, each city will get ₹ 5000 million from the center for implementing various projects.

=== Climate ===
Shillong

Climate chart (precipitation, max. and min. temperature)
J	F	M	A	M	J	J	A	S	O	N	D
14 15 4	23 17 6	54 21 11	130 23 14	274 24 15	469 24 17	395 24 18	318 24 18	294 23 17	192 22 13	37 19 9	9.3 16 5
- █ Average max. and min. temperatures in °C
- █ Precipitation totals in mm
- Source: World Weather Information Service
Imperial conversion
J	F	M	A	M	J	J	A	S	O	N	D
0.5 60 40	0.9 63 44	2.1 70 51	5.1 74 57	11 74 60	18 75 63	16 75 64	13 75 64	12 74 62	7.6 71 56	1.5 66 48	0.4 61 42
- █ Average max. and min. temperatures in °F
- █ Precipitation totals in inches

Weather conditions in Shillong are typically pleasant and pollution-free. In the summer, the temperature varies from 15 °C (59 °F) to 26 °C (79 °F). In the winter, the temperature drops to as low as 4 °C (39 °F).

Under Köppen's climate classification, the city features a subtropical highland climate (Cwb). Its summers are cool and very rainy, while its winters are cool yet dry. Shillong is subject to the vagaries of the monsoon. The monsoons arrive in June, and it rains almost until the end of October.

Shillong was ranked among the top 10 Indian cities with the cleanest air and the best AQI in 2024.

Climate data for Shillong (C.S.O) 1991–2020, extremes 1902–present
Month	Jan	Feb	Mar	Apr	May	Jun	Jul	Aug	Sep	Oct	Nov	Dec	Year
Record high °C (°F)	24.9 (76.8)	26.1 (79.0)	28.1 (82.6)	30.2 (86.4)	29.5 (85.1)	29.5 (85.1)	28.2 (82.8)	29.5 (85.1)	29.9 (85.8)	27.8 (82.0)	25.1 (77.2)	23.2 (73.8)	30.2 (86.4)
Mean daily maximum °C (°F)	15.2 (59.4)	17.5 (63.5)	21.4 (70.5)	23.4 (74.1)	23.7 (74.7)	24.2 (75.6)	24.2 (75.6)	24.4 (75.9)	23.7 (74.7)	21.9 (71.4)	19.3 (66.7)	16.4 (61.5)	21.2 (70.2)
Mean daily minimum °C (°F)	5.7 (42.3)	7.5 (45.5)	11.2 (52.2)	14.1 (57.4)	15.6 (60.1)	17.4 (63.3)	17.9 (64.2)	17.7 (63.9)	16.8 (62.2)	14.2 (57.6)	10.4 (50.7)	7.2 (45.0)	12.9 (55.2)
Record low °C (°F)	−0.9 (30.4)	−2.4 (27.7)	2.7 (36.9)	6.6 (43.9)	8.5 (47.3)	10.0 (50.0)	12.3 (54.1)	10.0 (50.0)	10.7 (51.3)	6.7 (44.1)	−0.5 (31.1)	−3.3 (26.1)	−3.3 (26.1)
Average rainfall mm (inches)	12.6 (0.50)	15.4 (0.61)	42.7 (1.68)	131.4 (5.17)	244.5 (9.63)	423.7 (16.68)	402.0 (15.83)	328.4 (12.93)	270.1 (10.63)	197.2 (7.76)	24.7 (0.97)	7.2 (0.28)	2,099.9 (82.67)
Average rainy days	1.6	1.9	4.0	9.9	16.1	18.0	17.3	17.3	14.5	8.4	1.5	0.7	111.3
Average relative humidity (%) (at 17:30 IST)	86	76	67	72	81	85	86	87	90	90	88	89	83
Mean monthly sunshine hours	223.2	223.2	232.5	219.0	170.5	108.0	99.2	108.5	102.0	176.7	216.0	235.6	2,114.4
Mean daily sunshine hours	7.2	7.9	7.5	7.3	5.5	3.6	3.2	3.5	3.4	5.7	7.2	7.6	5.8
Source: India Meteorological Department (sun 1971–2000)

== Demographics ==
Religions in Shillong City (2011)
1. Christianity (46.5%)
2. Hinduism (42.0%)
3. Tribal religion (4.50%)
4. Islam (4.89%)
5. Sikhism (1.14%)
6. Buddhism (0.74%)
7. Jainism (0.13%)
8. Not Stated (0.16%)
Languages spoken across Shillong city (2011)
1. Khasi (46.9%)
2. Bengali (20.2%)
3. Hindi (10.9%)
4. Nepali (9.83%)
5. Assamese (2.84%)
6. Garo (2.50%)
7. Punjabi (1.83%)
8. Urdu (0.76%)
9. others (4.27%)

As of the 2011 Census of India, Shillong had a total population of 143,229, of which 70,135 were males, and 73,094 were females. As per the 2011 language census report, 67,154 of the city's population speak Khasi as their native language, 28,984 speak Bengali, 15,559 speak Hindi, 14,085 speak Nepali, 4,069 speak Assamese, 2,632 speak Punjabi, 3,580 speak Garo, 1,088 speak Urdu, and 6,115 speak other languages. 14,317 were aged 0 to 6 years. The literacy rate was 83.5% or 119,642 people: 84.8% for males and 82.3% for females. The effective literacy rate of people aged 7 years and older was 92.8%, 94.8% for males, and 90.9% for females. The Scheduled Castes and Scheduled Tribes populations were 1,551 and 73,307, respectively. Shillong had 31,025 households in 2011. As per the 1971 census (before the creation of Meghalaya state in 1972), non-tribals constituted 58.53% of the population of Shillong.

== Governance and politics ==
=== Civic administration ===
Shillong is administered by the Shillong Municipal Board, which originated in 1878 and became a municipality in 1909 under the Meghalaya Municipal Act of 1973. The area that is covered by the Municipal Board is 25 square kilometers, and there are currently 27 wards.

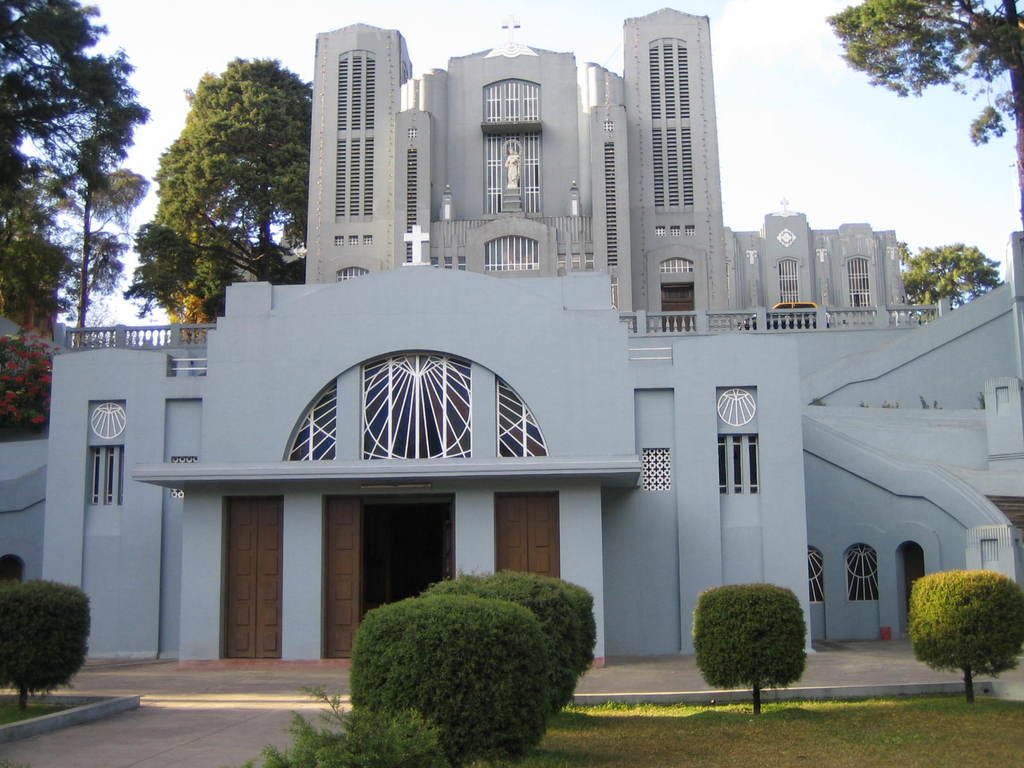
The Mary Help of Christians Cathedral, Shillong, is one of the largest churches in India

According to the 2011 census, Christianity is the dominant religion in the city, practiced by 46.49% of the population, followed by Hinduism at 41.95%, Islam at 4.89%, and to a lesser degree, that is, 2.01%, Sikhism, Buddhism, and Jainism. An ancient indigenous religion of the Khasi and Jaintia tribes is still followed by 4.5% of the population. The Shillong metropolitan region, which includes the towns of Laitumkhrah, Lawsohtun, Madanrting, Mawlai, Mawpat, Nongkseh, Nongmynsong, Nongthymmai, Pynthorumkhrah, Shillong Cantonment, Umlyngka, and Umpling, had a population of 354,759, 12% of which was under six years of age. The literacy rate in the metro region was 91%.

== Places of interest ==
The popular tourist sites in and around the city include:

- Elephant Falls: 12 km on the outskirts of the city, the mountain stream descends through three successive falls set in dells of fern covered rocks.
- Ka Phan Nonglait Park: The park stretches over a kilometre and has an adjacent mini zoo.
- Ward's Lake: Known locally as Nan-Polok. It is an artificial lake with garden and boating facilities, built during the colonial era.
- Shillong Golf Course: A group of British civil service officers introduced golf to Shillong in 1898 by constructing a nine-hole course. The present 18-hole course was inaugurated in 1924 and built by Captain Jackson and C. K. Rhodes.
- Motphran: The "Monument of France", which is locally known as "Motphran" was erected in memory of the 26th Khasi Labour Corps who served under the British in France during World War I.
- Shillong Peak: A picnic spot, 10 km from the city, 1966 m above sea level, offers a panoramic view of the scenic countryside and is the highest point in the state. Obeisance is paid to U Shyllong at the sanctum sanctorum at the peak's summit every springtime, by the religious priest of Khyrim/Mylliem State.
- Ever Living Museum: Founded by Kyntiewbor War and located in Mawshbuit, Shillong. It is an ethnographic museum that exhibits the culture of the Khasi, Jaintia, and Garo communities of Meghalaya. This museum showcases an extensive collection of artefacts, including traditional weapons, musical instruments, and bamboo crafts. It also houses a "stone museum" displaying various rocks, gemstones, fossils, etc. Alongside a vibrant garden which is full of indigenous orchids, herbal plants, and fruits.
- Don Bosco Centre for Indigenous Cultures: The Don Bosco Museum is part of DBCIC (Don Bosco Centre for Indigenous Cultures). DBCIC comprises research on cultures, publications, training, animation programmes, and the museum, which is a place of knowledge-sharing on the cultures of the northeast in particular, and of culture in general.
- State Museum: Located at the State Central Library complex
- Cathedral of Mary Help of Christians is in Don Bosco Square
- Bishop and Beadon Falls: Both cascade down the same escarpment into a deep valley
- Spread Eagle Falls: 3 km from polo grounds
- Sweet Falls: Sweet Falls (also called "Weitdem", in the native dialect) is a waterfall located about 5 km from the Happy Valley and is about 96 m in height.
- Crinoline Falls: Near Phan Nonglait Park
- Umiam Lake: En-route Guwahati to Shillong
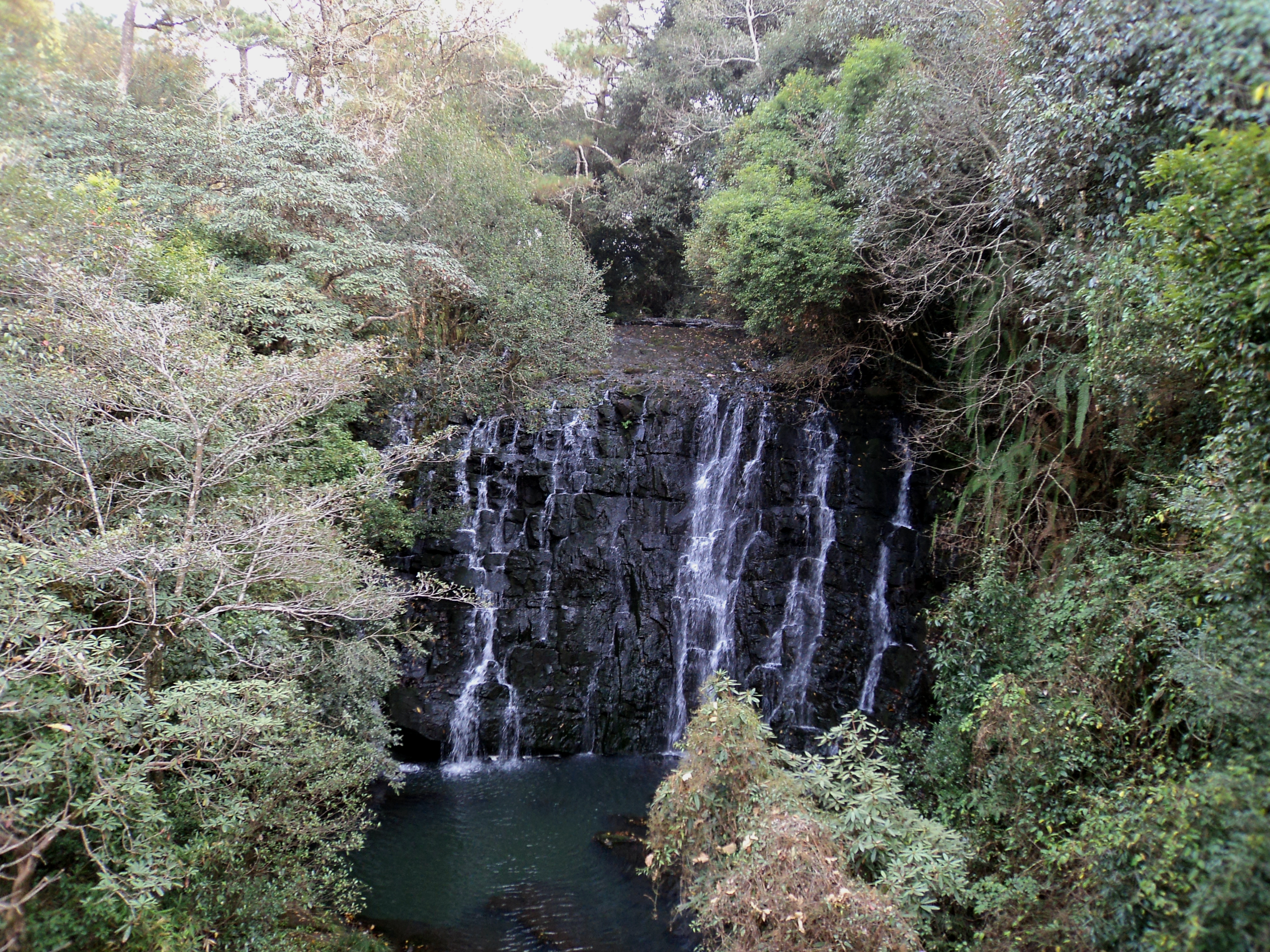
Elephant Falls

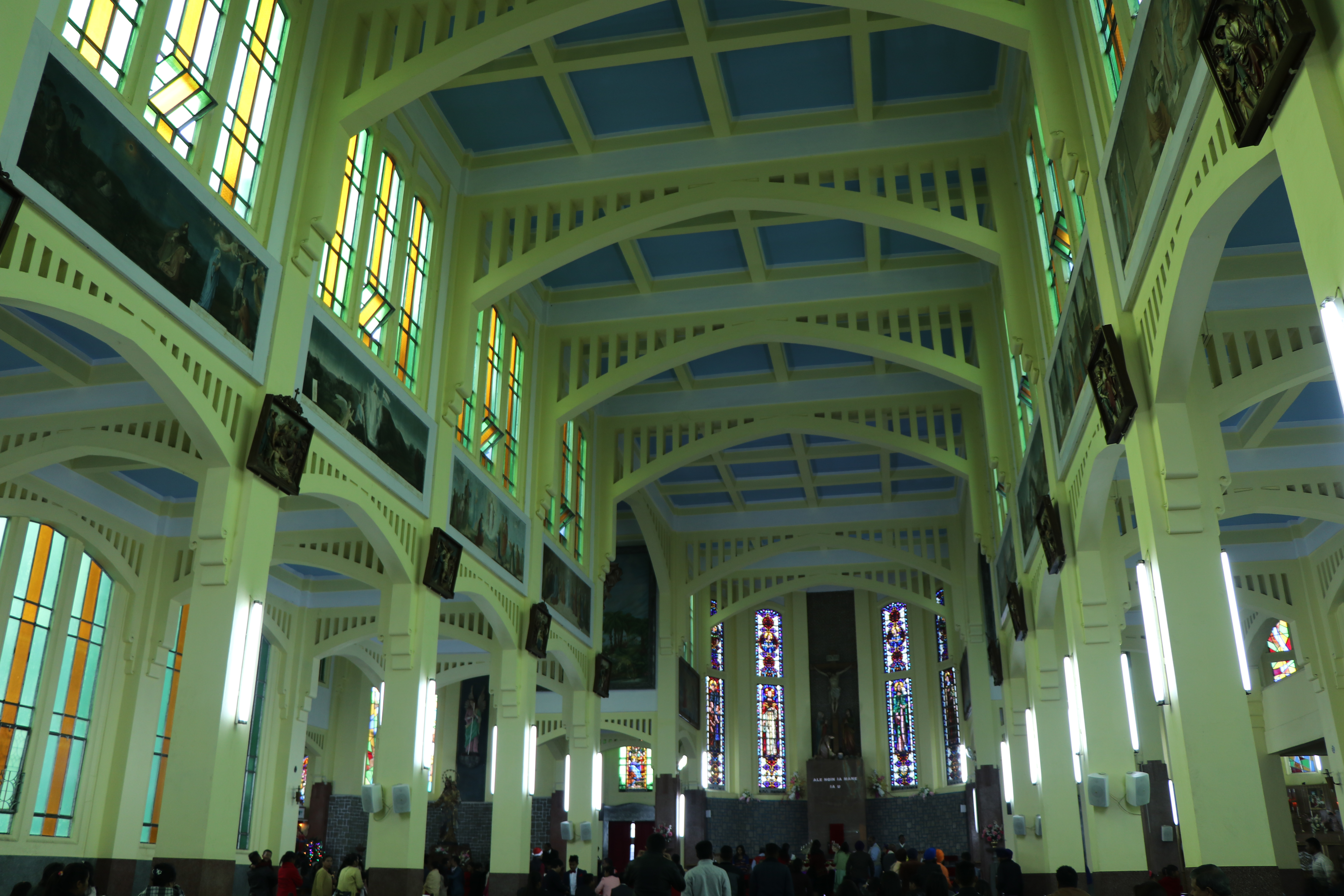
Mary Help of Christians Cathedral

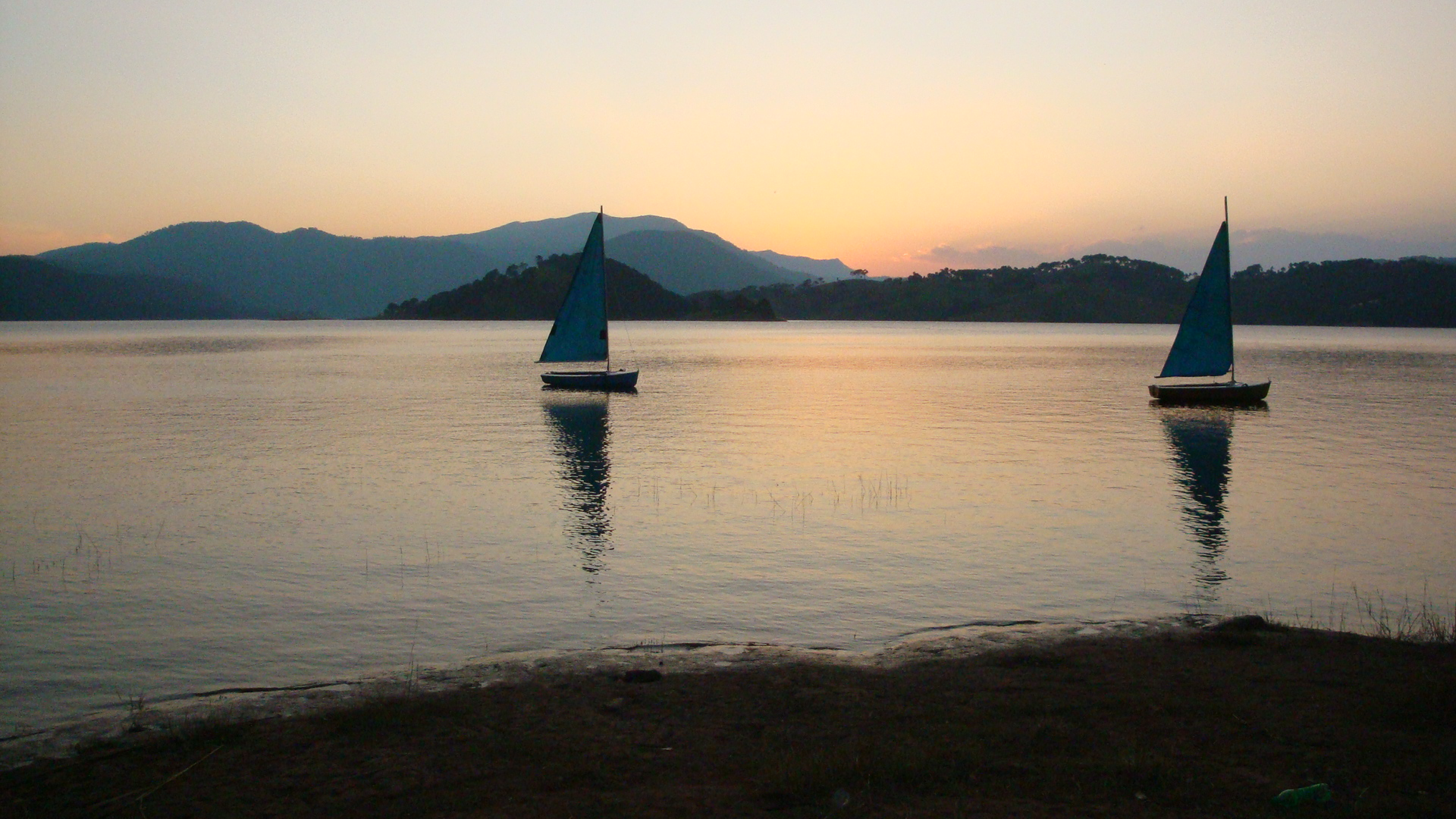
Umiam Lake

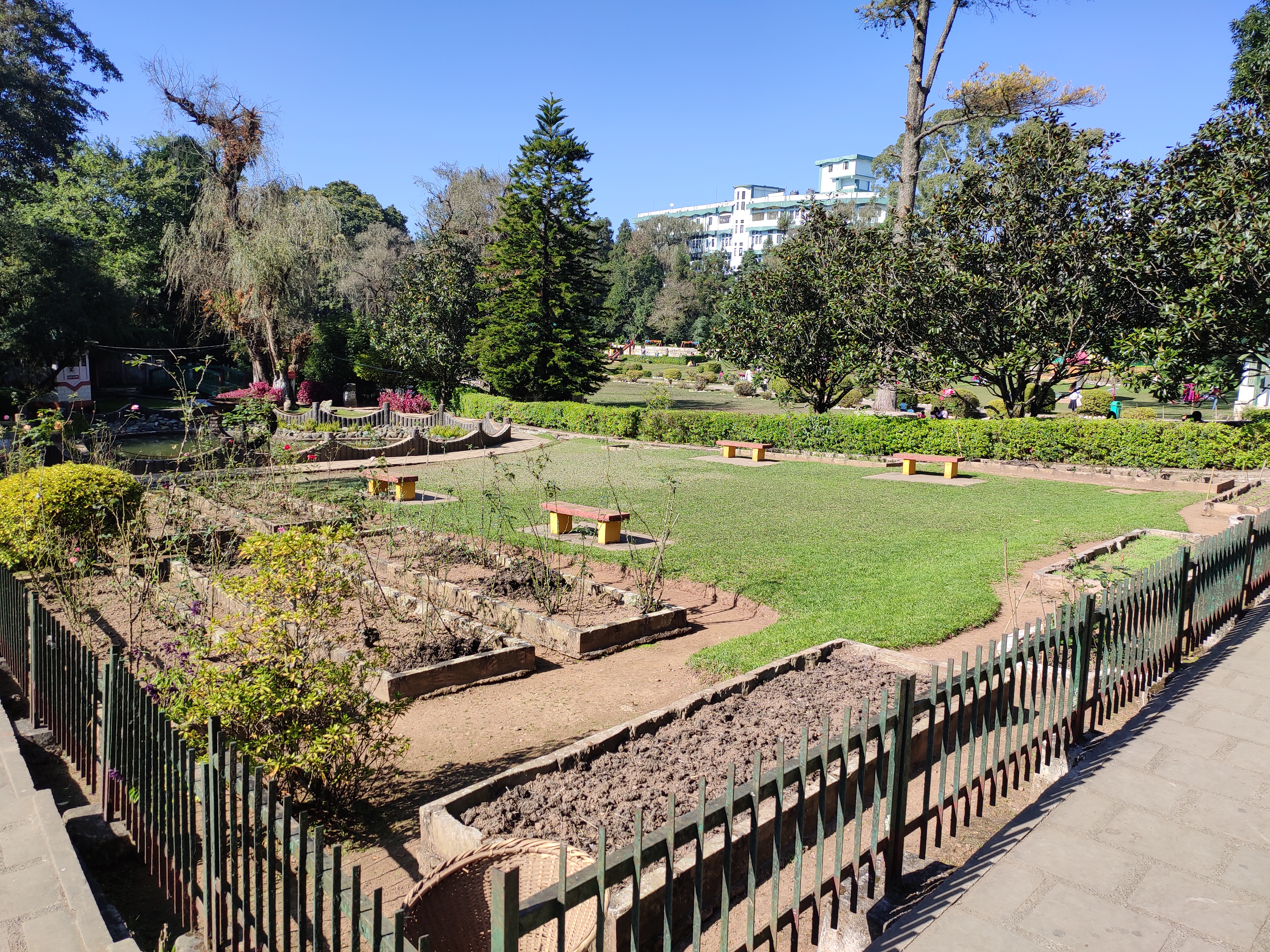
Lady Hydari Park

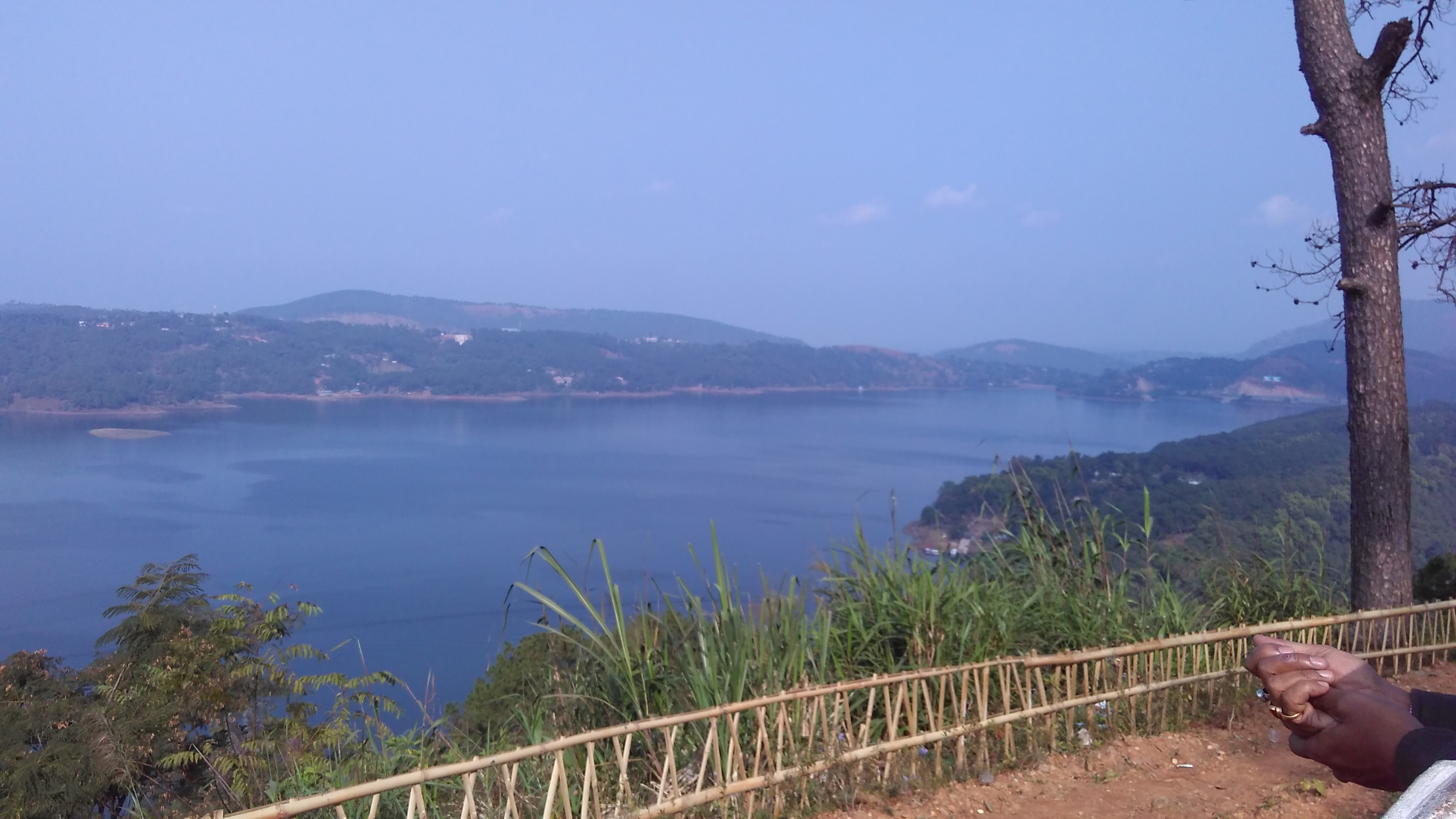
Shillong Barapani Lake

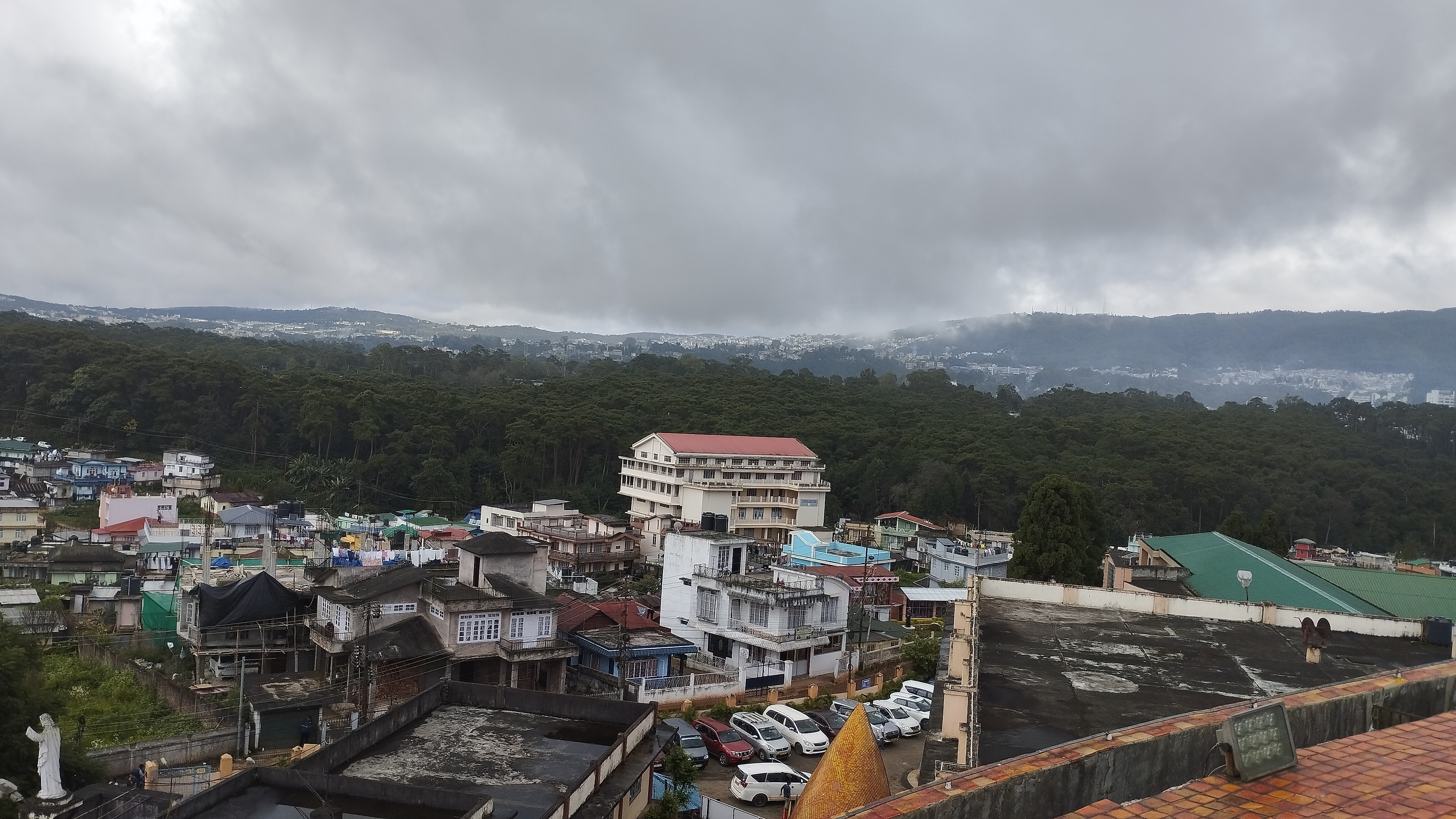
Shillong City view from Don Bosco Museum

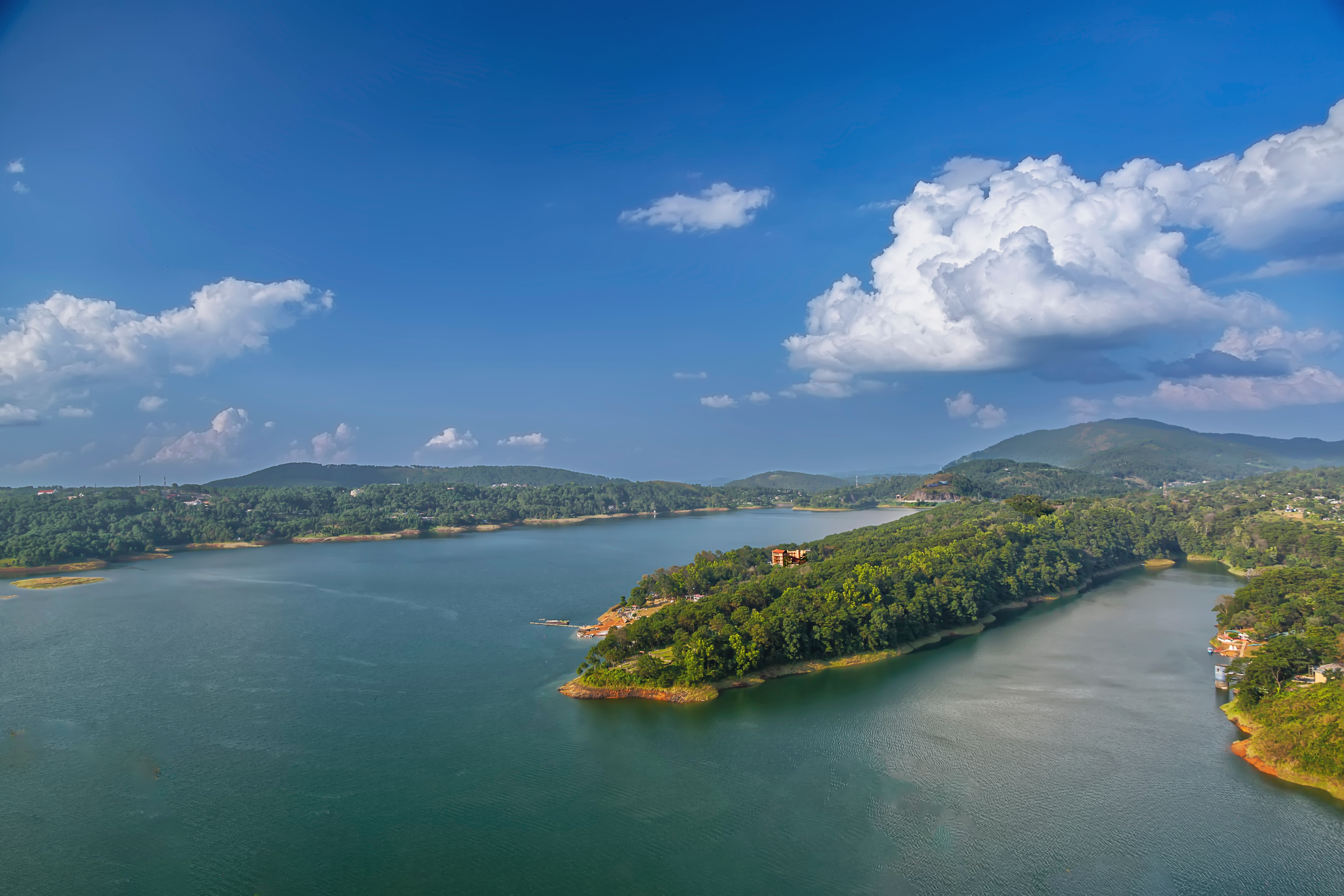

== Transport ==
Shillong is well-connected by road, but it neither has rail connections nor a proper air connection. Umroi Airport located 30 kilometres (19 miles) from the city centre has limited flights only.

=== Roadways ===
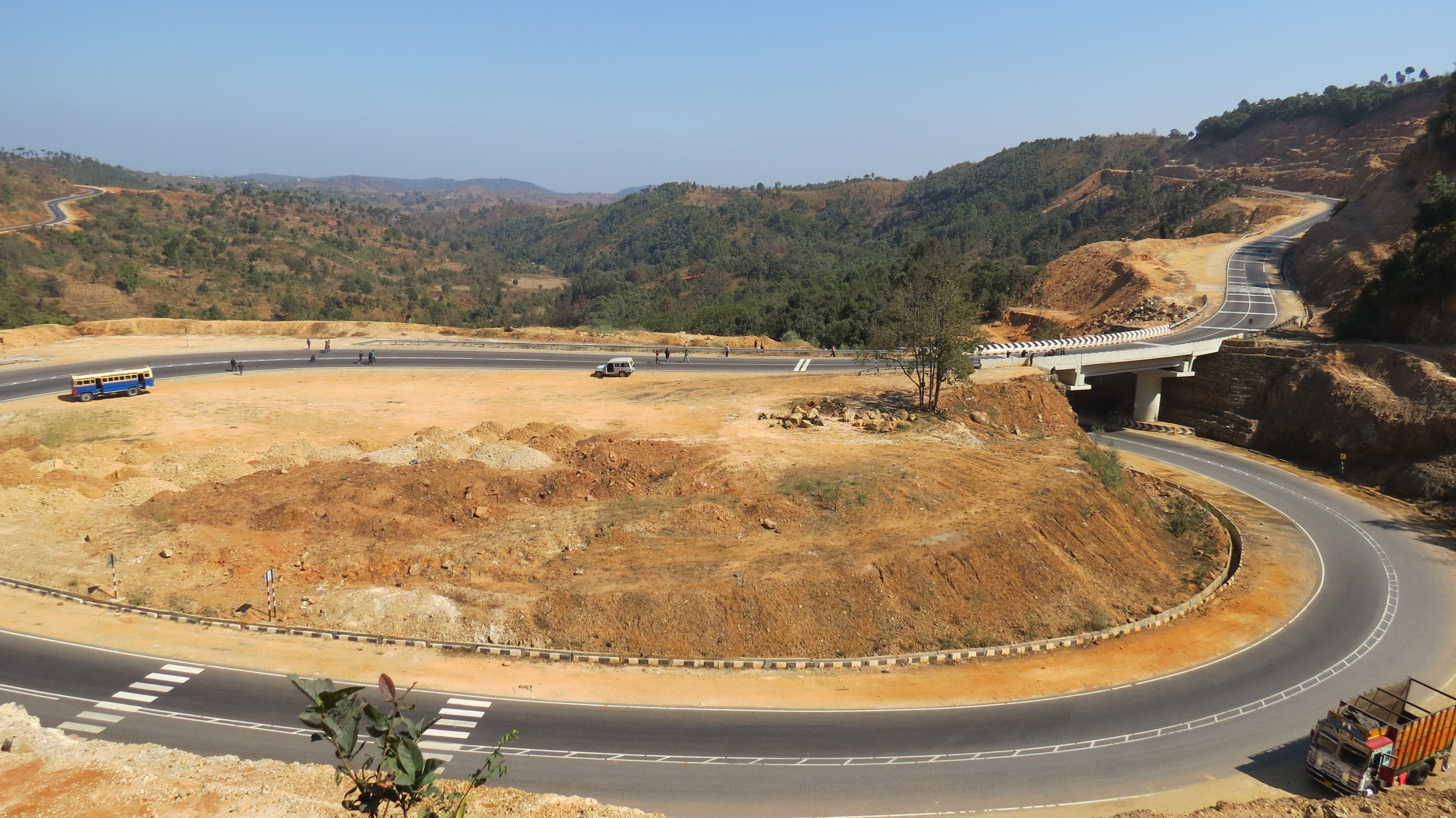
Shillong Bypass road

There are road connections to Shillong from all major northeastern states. The three major National Highways that pass through are:

- National Highway 6 (India) – Connected to Guwahati, Tripura and Mizoram
- National Highway 106 (India) - Connected to Nongstoin
- National Highway 206 (India) - Connected to Dawki
- Shillong–Silchar High-Speed Corridor - connected to Silchar: 166.8 km (103.6 mi) from Mawlyngkhung near Shillong to Panchgram on NH-6 near Silchar, will cut travel time between the two cities from 8.5 hours to 5 hours and act as a continuation of Kaladan Multi-Modal Transit Transport Project offering a new Rs 22,864 crore high-speed highway between the North-East and Kolkata bypassing Bangladesh, executed by the National Highways and Infrastructure Development Corporation Limited (NHIDCL) and expected to be completed by 2030.

Private bus operators and state transport buses from other states come to and from Shillong daily. Taxi services are also available to destinations like Guwahati, Agartala, Kohima, Dimapur, Aizawl, and other North Eastern towns and cities.

The Shillong Bypass is a two-lane road that stretches across 47.06 kilometres (29.2 miles), connecting Umiam (NH-40) to Jorabat (NH-44), which then leads to the other northeastern Indian states of Mizoram and Tripura. The project was estimated to cost around ₹220 crore (US$24 million) and was completed over two years (2011–2013).

=== Airways ===
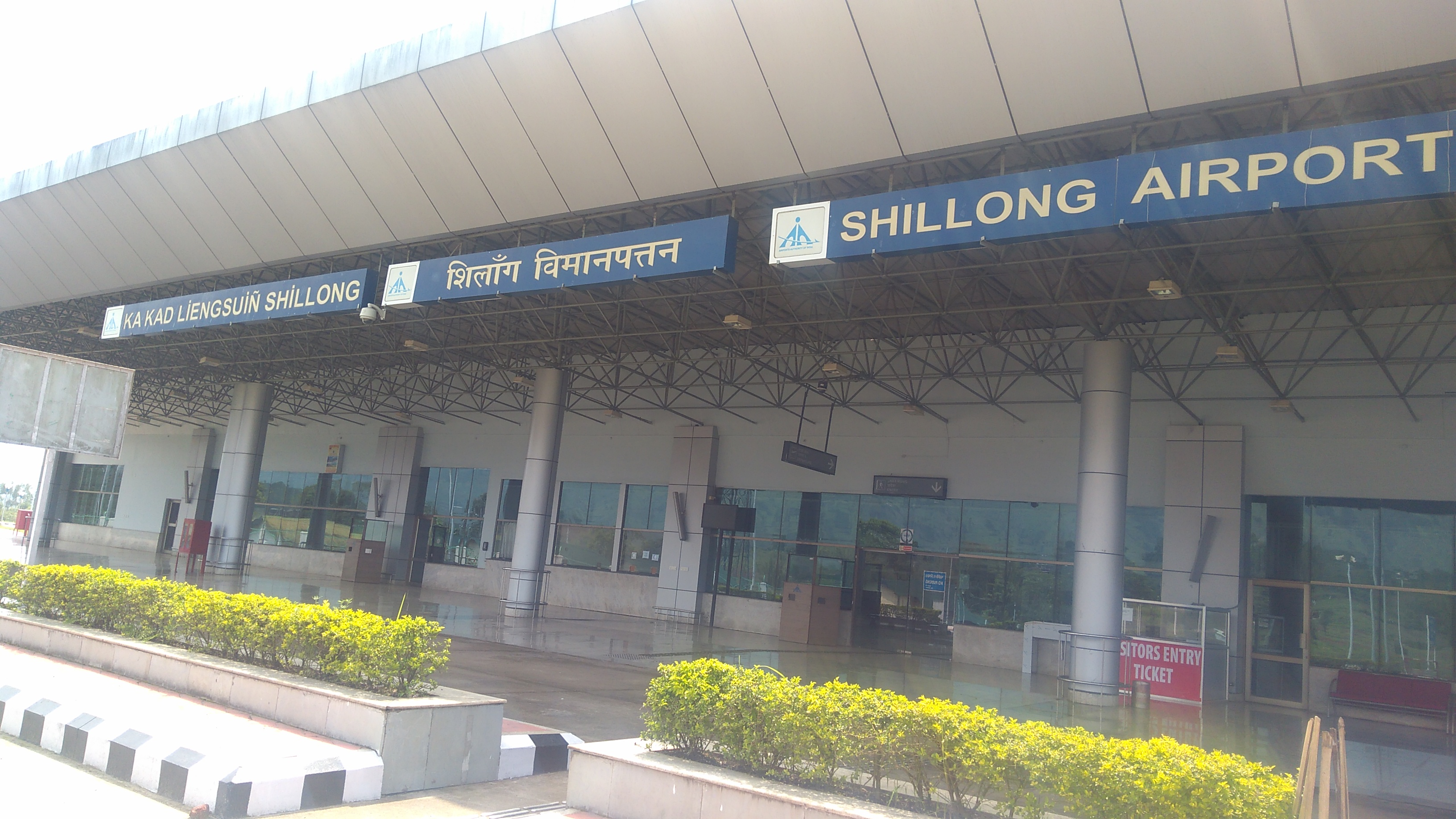
Shillong Airport

Shillong is served by the Shillong Airport, located about 30 km away in Umroi. The airport has daily flights to and from Kolkata. It also has flights to and from Lilabari, Delhi, Silchar, Agartala, Imphal, Dimapur, Dibrugarh, and Guwahati. Indigo, Alliance Air, and SpiceJet operate regular services from the airport.

=== Railways ===
The 22 km (14 mi) long Tetelia-Byrnihat line from Guwahati's suburb Tetelia to Byrnihat near Shillong in Meghalaya is a planned railway project with an estimated completion by 2026. The construction of an extension from Byrnihat to Shillong is also expected to start in 2026.

== Education ==
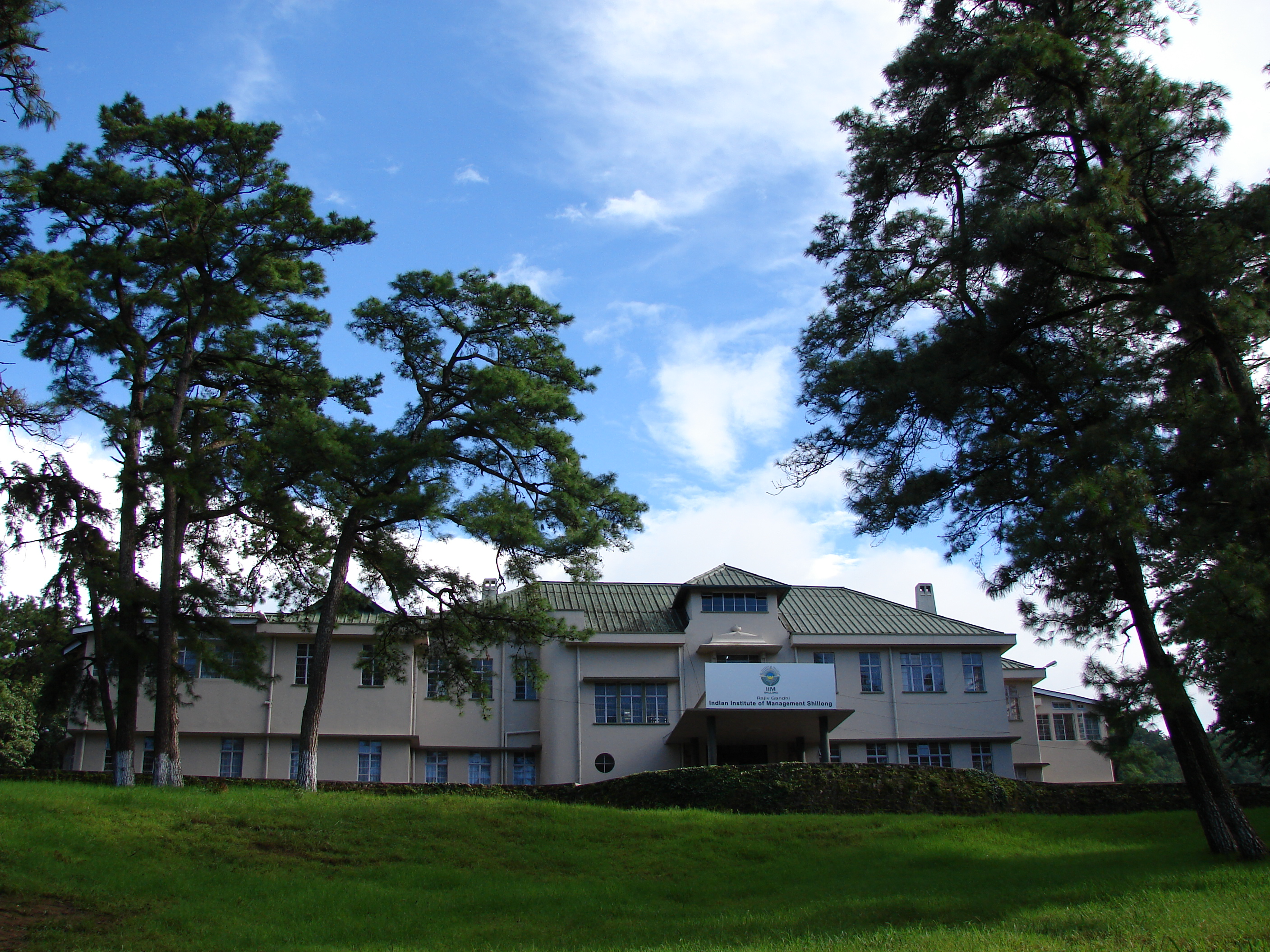
Indian Institute of Management

=== Autonomous institutions ===
- North Eastern Indira Gandhi Regional Institute of Health and Medical Sciences
- Indian Institute of Management Shillong
- National Institute of Technology Meghalaya
- National Institute of Fashion Technology Shillong
- North Eastern Institute of Ayurveda and Homeopathy
- Institute of Hotel Management

=== General degree colleges ===
- St. Edmund's College
- Shillong College
- Synod College
- Women's College, Shillong

=== Medical College ===
- North Eastern Indira Gandhi Regional Institute of Health and Medical Sciences

=== Law schools ===
- National Law University, Meghalaya

=== Central Universities ===
- English and Foreign Languages University
- North Eastern Hill University (NEHU)
- Indira Gandhi National Open University (IGNOU)

=== Private Universities ===
- Martin Luther Christian University
- William Carey University, Meghalaya

== Media ==
Shillong has a strong local media. There are a number of theatres, newspapers, magazines, local radio, and television stations.

=== Cinema ===
Cinemas in Shillong include Bijou Cinema Hall, Gold Cinema, and Anjalee Cinema Hall (also called Galleria Anjalee Cinema).

=== Print media ===
Newspapers are published in Shillong in Khasi and English. Prominent English dailies published here include Shillong Times, Meghalaya Guardian, Highland Post, Meghalaya Times, and The Sentinel. Khasi dailies like U Mawphor, U Nongsaiñ Hima Peitngor, Kynjat Shai among others are published here. Weekly newspapers are "Salonsar" and "Dongmusa". There are magazines like "Iing Khristan" (100 years of publication), "Pateng Mynta" in Khasi, and "Youth Today" and "Eastern Panorama" in English.

=== Electronic media ===
The radio industry in Shillong has expanded with the introduction of a number of private and government-owned FM channels. State-owned Doordarshan transmits terrestrial television channels. News channels like Peitngor Cable News (PCN), Ri Khasi Channel, Batesi, and T7 are broadcast weekly on the local cable networks.

=== Communication services ===
Fixed telephone lines are available in Shillong. Internet services are available via both wired and wireless broadband. It is also well covered in mobile networks, with all major cellular providers like Airtel, Vodafone Idea, BSNL, and Jio available here.

== Sport ==
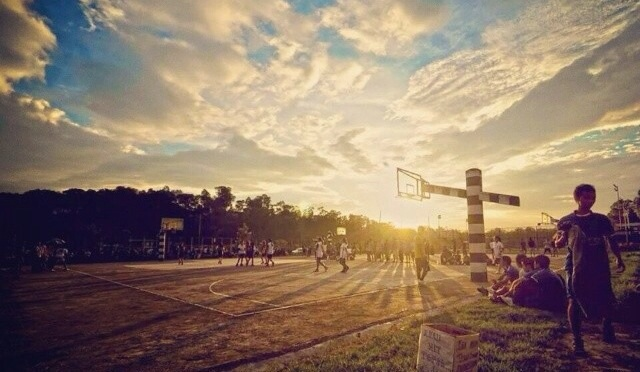
Polo basketball court

Shillong is one of the capital cities in Northeast India to have had three football clubs participate in the I-League, namely, Rangdajied United FC, Royal Wahingdoh FC, and Shillong Lajong FC. All three clubs play their home matches at Jawaharlal Nehru Stadium and SSA Stadium. Royal Wahingdoh FC was adjudged 2nd runners-up in the 2014–15 season of the I-League.

The Shillong Golf Course is one of the oldest golf courses in the country and is surrounded by pine and rhododendron trees.

Among people of the Khasi tribe of Meghalaya, archery has been both a sport, a form of defence for several centuries, and gambling (teer). While modern customs have replaced many of the traditional aspects of the culture here, a pervasive fascination for archery remains. Shillong teer is an authorized game that is subject to regulations established by the Meghalaya Amusement and Betting Tax Act. The Khasi Hills Archery Sports Association is responsible for managing this lottery event.

Beningstar Lyngkhoi from Shillong is a national marathon runner and represented India in the 2010 Commonwealth Games. He is the fastest marathoner in India with a timing of two hours 18.49 seconds.

Club	Sport	League	Stadium
Shillong Lajong FC	Football	Indian Football League	Jawaharlal Nehru Stadium, Shillong
Rangdajied United F.C.	Football	I-League 3	Jawaharlal Nehru Stadium, Shillong
Ryntih FC	Football	I-League 3	Jawaharlal Nehru Stadium, Shillong

== Headquarters Eastern Air Command, Indian Air Force ==
HQ Eastern Air Command (HQ, EAC) was shifted to Shillong on 10 June 1963 from Kolkata and housed in the old buildings located at Nonglyer village in Upper Shillong, some 10 km (6.2 mi) from (Lower) Shillong, but at a greater altitude of around 1,800 metres (6,000 ft) AMSL. It was initially a British military base, but was taken over by the No. 58 Gorkha Regiment of the Indian Army post-independence in 1947. The Regiment was redeployed after the Sino-Indian War of 1962, making way for the IAF to step in. Helicopters can only operate from the HQ, EAC, using a 12.7-hectare (31-acre) helipad.

EAC controls air operations in the eastern sector, which includes West Bengal, Assam, Mizoram, and the other eastern states bordering Bangladesh, Burma, and Tibet. EAC comprises permanent airbases at Chabua, Gauhati, Bagdogra, Barrackpore, Hashimara, Jorhat, Kalaikunda and Tezpur with forward airbases at Agartala, Calcutta, Panagarh and Shillong.

== Neighbourhoods ==
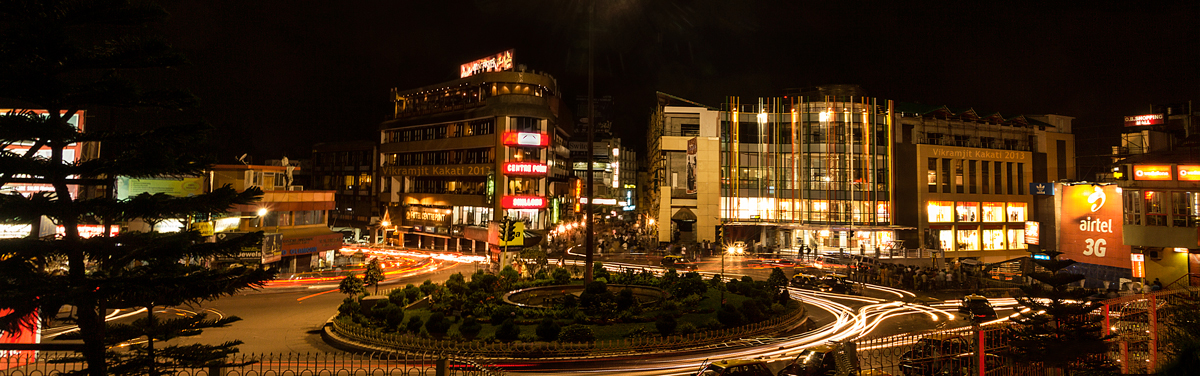
Panorama of Police Bazar which is an important economic centre and major commercial hub of Shillong

The historic neighbourhoods of Shillong include Mawkhar, Jaiaw, Riatsamthiah, Umsohsun, Wahingdoh, Khyndailad (Police Bazar), Mawlai, Laitumkhrah, Laban, Malki, Nongthymmai, and Polo.

== See also ==
- Tourism in North East India
