= Women's College, Shillong =

College in Meghalaya, India

Coordinates: 25.5765°N 91.8988°E

- Motto: "Radiance unto ALL"
- Type: Public
- Established: 1984
- Principal: Ratnadip Roy
- Location: Shillong, Meghalaya, India
- Campus: Urban
- Website: womenscollege.ac.in

The Women's College, Shillong is a college in the north east state of Meghalaya.

It is an Education India sponsored linguistic minority institution established in 1984. Functioning now from its own complex at Upper New Colony, Laitumkhrah, Shillong, India, the college offers academic courses from the plus two level to the Three Years integrated Degree (Honours & Pass) in the Arts stream of studies.

The institution began at the campus of St. Edmund's College, Shillong. The institution serves tribal women from the north-eastern part of India.

An aided institution of the government of Meghalaya since 1991, the institution is affiliated to the Meghalaya Board of Secondary Education for its plus two level courses while for the Degree courses, it is affiliated to the North Eastern Hill University, Shillong.

The Department of Political Science of the college organised a summer school, on Contemporary Political Theory and Politics in India, in April 2023.
