= Ward's Lake (Shillong) =

Artificial lake in Shillong, India

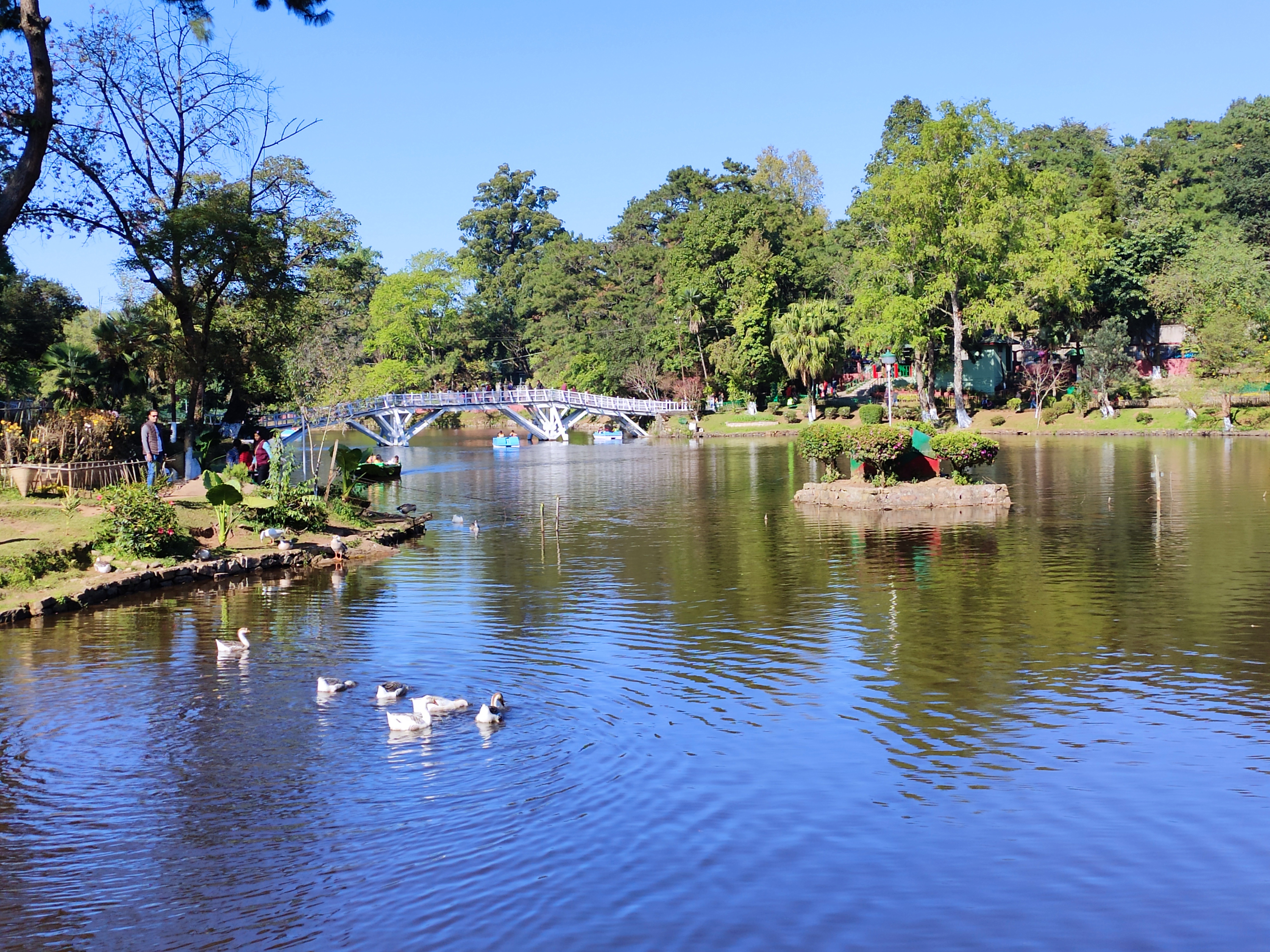
- Ward's Lake, Shillong

- Location of Ward's Lake Ward's Lake (India)
- Location: Shillong, Meghalaya, India
- Coordinates: 25.575°N 91.887°E
- Type: Lake
- Basin countries: India
- Islands: 1
- Settlements: Shillong

Ward's Lake, locally known as Pollock Lake or Nan Polok, is an artificial lake in Shillong, Meghalaya, India. Located in the centre of the city, it is one of the most visited tourist destinations in Shillong.

== History ==
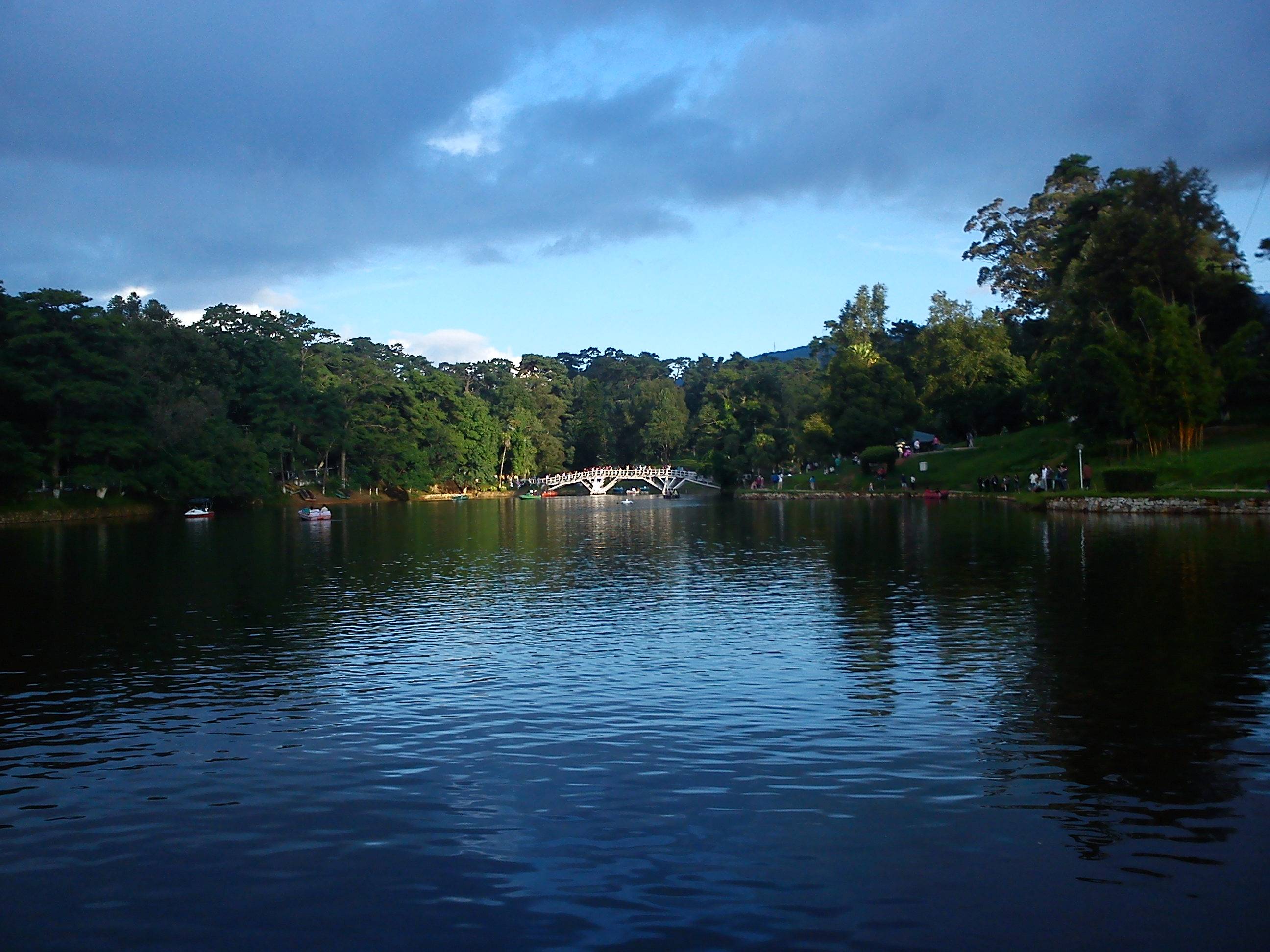
Ward's Lake

The lake was planned by the then chief commissioner of Assam, Sir William Ward. It was designed by Fitzwilliam Thomas Pollok and built by Colonel Hopkins in 1894. It is said that the area around the lake was developed by a Khasi prisoner who did so to mitigate the monotony of his daily routine.

== The lake ==
The horse-shoe-shaped lake lies close to the Raj Bhavan, the Governor's official residence. The lake is surrounded by a botanical garden with cobble-stone footpaths and a fountain. The botanical garden has several orchids besides other floral species. One of the most prominent features of the lake is a wooden bridge in the middle of the lake. The lake has a boating facility and a cafeteria next to it.
