= Laitmynsaw =

Village in Meghalaya, India

Coordinates: 25.541°N 91.821°E

Laitmynsaw is a village located in Mylliem Tehsil, East Khasi Hills District. As of the year of 2022, it had a total population of around 198 people. Its sex ratio was 1,058 females per thousand males, which is higher than that of Meghalaya (984). Children age 0-6 number 33, or 18.64% of the total population. The village's literacy rate is 90.28%, higher than the average rate of Meghalaya (74.43%); 88.57% for males and 91.89% for females.

The village boasts Mattilang Park, which is a tourist destination. Opposite to the park is the Elephant Falls. The village also has a lower primary school run by the government, which enrolls 33 students and employs two teachers. The village has a headman who is chosen by the people.
