= Ward Lake (Vancouver Island) =

- Location within Vancouver Island
- Location: Vancouver Island, British Columbia
- Coordinates: 49°17′44″N 124°48′18″W
- Lake type: Natural lake
- Basin countries: Canada

Ward Lake is a lake located on Vancouver Island at the headwaters of Ward Creek north of the Sproat Lake.

== See also ==
- List of lakes of British Columbia
