= Ward Lake (McLeod and Sibley counties, Minnesota) =

Lake in the state of Minnesota, United States

- Location within Minnesota
- Location: McLeod and Sibley County, Minnesota
- Coordinates: 44°37′53″N 94°27′1″W
- Type: lake

Ward Lake is located in the U.S. state of Minnesota.

The lake is named after a pioneer settler.

== See also ==
- List of lakes in Minnesota
