= Francis Fenech =

Maltese prelate

His Excellency Francis Xavier Fenech O.F.M. Cap.
- Bishop of Jhansi
- Church: Roman Catholic
- Diocese: Jhansi
- Appointed: 18 July 1954
- In office: 1954-1967
- Successor: Baptist Mudartha
- Other post: Titular Bishop of Muzuca in Byzacena
- Previous post: Prefect of Jhansi (1946-1954)

Orders
- Ordination: 23 May 1918 by Giovanni Maria Camilleri
- Consecration: 28 November 1954 by Mikiel Gonzi
- Rank: Bishop

Personal details
- Born: Joseph Fenech; 17 March 1892 Floriana, Malta
- Died: 13 May 1969 (aged 77) Asha Nikeian, Bhopal, India
- Buried: St. Jude's Shrine of Jhansi India

Francis Xavier Fenech (17 March 1892 – 13 May 1969) was a Maltese prelate who became the first bishop of Jhansi in India.

He was born in Floriana Malta on 17 March 1892. He studied at St Aloysius College in Birkirkara. At the age of 19 he joined the Capuchin order where he was given the name of Francis Xavier and followed a course of philosophy and theology. He was ordained to the priesthood by Giovanni Maria Camilleri the Bishop of Gozo on 25 May 1918. After his ordination he was assigned to work in the parish of Marsa.

In June 1923 Fenech left Malta for Daman to Bombay, present day Mumbai in India. He spent six years in Bandra, Zaroli, Itarsi and Shampura. In April 1929 he was stationed in Jhansi in order to develop this territory into a diocese. The territory of Jhansi was separated from the Diocese of Allahabad in 1940 and created into an Apostolic Prefecture. Fenech was appointed as the Apostolic Administrator of the dioceses of Allahabad and Lucknow because their bishop Joseph A. Poli was taken prisoner in a concentration camp.

In 1946 Fenech was appointed as the first prefect of the Apostolic Prefecture of Jhansi. In 1954 Pope Pius XII elevated the Prefecture into the Diocese of Jhansi and appointed Fenech as its first bishop. He was consecrated on 28 November that year by Archbishop Mikiel Gonzi of Malta at the St John's Co-Cathedral in Valletta.

During his time as bishop he worked tirelessly in improving the diocese's structure and established a diocesan clergy. He also founded many charities, schools and hospitals. On 8 May 1967 he retired as Bishop of Jhansi and was appointed as titular Bishop of Muzuca in Byzacena. Fenech died on 13 May 1969 of cerebral haemorrhage in India. He was buried in St. Jude's Shrine of Jhansi (India).
