= St. Joseph Church, Belman =

St. Joseph Church
- St. Joseph Church and Parish of Belman
- St. Joseph Church
- 13°09′58.5″N 74°52′12.2″E
- Location: Belmannu, Karkala taluk, Udupi district, Karnataka, India
- Country: India
- Denomination: Roman Catholic
- Tradition: Latin Rite in Konkani
- Website: belmanchurch.in

History
- Former name: St. Joseph Chapel
- Status: Parish
- Founded: 10 September 1894
- Founder: Nicholas Carneiro
- Dedication: St. Joseph
- Events: 23 December 1914: Parish boundary decree; 24 December 1922: New church built; 11 April 1964: Kelmbet parish formed; 21 November 1982: Mukamar parish formed; 26 August 2018: Church renovation

Architecture
- Groundbreaking: 1887

Administration
- District: Udupi district
- Province: Bangalore
- Archdiocese: Archdiocese of Bangalore
- Diocese: Udupi
- Parish: Belman

Clergy
- Archbishop: Peter Machado
- Bishop: Gerald Isaac Lobo
- Priest: Rev. Fr Frederick Mascarenhas

St. Joseph Church, Belman is a Roman Catholic church and Parish is located in Belmannu, Karkala taluk, Udupi district, Karnataka, India. Formerly part of the Diocese of Mangalore, it became part of the Diocese of Udupi after Udupi became a separate diocese on 15 October 2011. The parish is part of the Archdiocese of Bangalore. It observes the Latin rite, with mass celebrated in Konkani with bilingual Kannada masses held on certain feast days.

The parish was founded in 1894. Its Catholic population is about 2,600 (in about 540 families), and it is divided into 21 wards. The Staff of St. Joseph (Konkani: ಸಾಂ ಜುಜೆಚಿ ಬೆತ್ಕಾಟಿ, romanized: San Zuzechi Betkati) is the parish newsletter. Baptist Mudartha, former bishop of Allahabad, is from the Parish.

== Location ==
St. Joseph Church is 48 kilometres (30 mi) north of Mangalore on the Padubidri-Kudremukh State Highway, and is surrounded by the parishes of St. Theresa of Child Jesus, The Church of Perpetual Succour, Our Lady of Sorrows - Shirva, St. John Bosco -Kelmbet, Our Lady of Fatima, St. Francis Xavier - Mudarangadi and St. Pius X Church.

== Etymology ==
Christian missionaries entered the district during the 16th century, strengthening in the 17th and 18th centuries until they were imprisoned by Tippu Sultan. The survivors settled into parishes. Christianity reportedly began in Shirva between 1534 and 1600. The word Belmannu derived from (Kannada: ಬಿಳಿ ಮಣ್ಣು, romanized: bili mannu, "white soil"). The Belman parish was once part of the Shirva parish. There were two churches at Shirva: N. S. De Saude under the Padroado of Portuguese India with its bishop in Goa, and St. Francis Xavier under the Sacred Congregation for the Propagation of the Faith (Latin: Sacra congregatio de propaganda fide).

== History ==
=== Parish formation ===
Permission was granted on 29 November 1886 by Bishop Nicholas Maria Pagani S.J., the Jesuit bishop of Mangalore, for the construction of a chapel at Belman. After other locations were considered, Madkamane (owned by a Brahmin family, and adjacent to the present-day church) was selected and construction of the chapel began in 1887. Construction was financed by the Mathias family, and the chapel was completed in seven years.

Permission to consecrate the chapel was granted by Bishop Nicholas Maria Pagani S.J. on 10 September 1894. The bishop's decree delineated Belman as a separate parish and appointed Nicholas Carneiro of St. Francis Xavier Church in Shirva to expand his priestly duties to the new parish. The chapel was blessed by Carneiro, who served the Belman parish from Shirva for a number of years, on 10 September 1894. The chapel had mud walls; its roof was thatched with hay, and it had no rectory or belfry. On 12 December 1900, the boundary between the Kirem and Belman parishes was settled.

A 23 December 1914 decree defined the boundaries of the Belman, Kirem, Kinnigoli and the future Bolkunje parishes. Since the chapel's roof had weakened, the foundation stone for a church was laid on 24 December 1922. The new church was consecrated on 2 May 1933 by Bishop Victor R. Fernandes. Only the sanctuary and main altar were plastered; the rest of the church was not yet built.

The Kelmbet parish was formed from Belman, and a chapel was built there by a decree dated 11 April 1964. St. Joseph High School was founded in November 1981. A 21 November 1982 decree formed the Mukamar parish from Belman. St. Joseph English Medium School was founded on 3 June 2012.

=== Priests ===
- Nicholas Carneiro (1894–1903): Founded an elementary school in 1896 (which became St. Joseph's Higher Primary School), and had the present Shirva-Belman road built.
- Rosario P. B. Lewis (1903–1906): Initially served the parish from Shirva and had a small, thatched-roof rectory with no facilities built near the chapel. After Lewis convened a 15 March 1904 meeting with representatives from Kallianpur, Karkala, N. S. De Saude and St. Francis Xavier in Shirva, Emmanuel Vas was appointed the resident parish priest. Between 1903 and 1914, a small cemetery was developed next to the chapel.
- Emmanuel Vas (1906–1910): Began construction of an improved rectory, established a post office there (the region's first), and implemented construction of the present-day Belman-Mundkur road.
- Peter R. D'Souza (1910–1913): Stabilized the parish's economic situation, completing the rectory (with a kitchen) and creating a reserve fund with paddy and rice collected from parishioners. The money obtained was loaned at low interest, with jewels as collateral.
- Antony A. E. Colaco (1913–1914): Came to Belman from Coondapur, where D'Souza was transferred on a temporary assignment. Due to ill health, Colaco was transferred in eleven months.
- Denis Lewis (1914–1934): Collected the remaining cost of the church from outside the parish and diocese after the Rs.16,000 contributed by parishioners. Lewis elevated the elementary school to a higher elementary school and appointed his nephew, Joseph Vas, headmaster. He established Little Flower (another elementary school) at Abbanadka, formed a choir, and expanded and walled the cemetery. Apoline Mathias succeeded Lewis as acting vicar of Belman for about a month.
- P. L. Bothelho (1934–1957): Took charge of the parish on 27 May 1934, an orator and musician who wrote Kavyam Zelho (a collection of Konkani poems). Bothelho was aided by a series of assistant priests, who worked in the schools (which were transferred to the Catholic Board of Education on 30 July 1934). He had a Lourdes-type grotto built and expanded and improved the church and rectory (including a bridge between the rectory and the church sanctuary). Bothelho's assistant priests were:

Name	Role	From	To
Jerome D'Souza	Headmaster	10 August 1942	10 April 1943
Ambrose C. Aranha	School administrator	23 March 1944	8 September 1944
Raymond D'Cunha	Headmaster	9 September 1944	5 May 1949
Thomas D'Sa	Headmaster	8 May 1949	11 May 1954
Norbert D'Souza	Administrator	16 May 1954	20 April 1957

- Nicholas J. Pereira (1957–1973): Arriving from Miyar on 24 April 1957, Pereira repaired and expanded the church and schools, built and consecrated chapels at Kelmbet and Mukamar, electrified the church and rectory in 1967, and began a youth sodality and a milk co-operative society. His assistants were:

Name	From	To
Gregory D'Souza	March 1958	March 1964
J. M. Pereira	15 August 1965	20 January 1966 (his death)
R. Moras	16 April 1966	15 October 1968
Thomas D'Sa	31 April 1969	24 April 1971
Charles Moras	22 April 1971	6 December 1974

- Aloysius Rodrigues (1973–1978): Serving from 26 May 1973 until his death on 20 May 1978, Rodrigues began construction of a school hall which became the Fr. A. Rodrigues Memorial Hall. He also began a youth club and a food-for-work programme. After Rodrigues' death his assistant, Andrew Lewis, served as parish priest and completed construction work on the hall.
- Lawrence Gomes (1978–1986): Serving from 1 July 1978, Gomes oversaw the 30 August 1978 dedication of the Fr. Rodrigues Memorial Hall by Bishop Basil Salvadore D'Souza and founded St. Joseph's High School in Belman. He acquired a hearse, made a number of improvements to the church and began a mother-and-child health programme. Gomes' assistant priests were:

Name	From	To
Rosario Fernandes	22 May 1980	27 June 1983
Walter D'Mello	9 May 1984	25 May 1987

- John Fernandes (1986–1994): Appointed on 18 May 1986, Fernandes completed construction of the high school, revitalized the parish council, and modernized the liturgy. During his tenure the parish celebrated its 100th anniversary, improvements were made to the church, schools and rectory, and a center for mentally challenged children was founded. Fernandes' assistants were:

Name	From	To
Gerald D'Souza	26 May 1987	23 May 1988
Victor George D'Souza	24 May 1988	11 June 1990
Peter D'Souza	7 June 1992	24 May 1993
Sylvester D'Costa	14 June 1993	19 May 1995

- Thomas D'Souza (1994–2001): Appointed on 28 June 1994, D'Souza's health was poor; on 7 May 2001, Lawrence Mascarenhas arrived as assistant priest and ran the parish as an assistant until on 31 December 2001 he died. Mascarenhas was then appointed parish priest by the bishop. Manavika, the school for mentally challenged children, was certified by the government on 26 October 1995. A mini hall was named in his memory. D'Souza's assistant priests were:

Name	From	To
Michael Santhumayor	21 May 1995	May 1997
Dolphy Monteiro	May 1997	1998
Jerome D'Souza	1998	2001
Lawrence Mascarenhas	7 May 2001	26 May 2002

- Lawrence Rodrigues (2002–2009): After Lawrence Mascarenhas was transferred and Rodrigues became parish priest, Pascal Menezes arrived as assistant priest. Rodrigues had three months to go until his 31 August 2002 retirement from Pompei Junior College in Kirem and shuttled between Belman and Kirem until then. He focused on parish organizations and activities, renovating and repairing the church (including the installation of toilets) and the Fr. Thomas D'Souza Memorial Mini Hall. A new rectory and chapel were built. Rodrigues was transferred to the Sacred Heart Church,Yermal parish in 2009. His assistant priests here were:

Name	From	To
Pascal Menezes	27 May 2002	22 May 2003
Praveen Amrith Martis	17 May 2003	17 May 2005
Vijay Lobo	16 May 2005	27 May 2007
Rocky Ravi Fernandes	10 May 2007	30 May 2009

- Lawrence B. D'Souza (2009–2016): Appointed on 1 June 2009, when Rodrigues was transferred to the smaller Yermal parish due to failing health.

Name	From	To
Edwin D'souza	2009	2010
Melwyn Lobo	2010	2011
Ronald Pinto	2011	2012
John Baptist Moras	2014	2016

- Sunil Veigas (2016-2017): Transferred to Mangalore Diocese on 1 June 2017.

Name	From	To
Melwyn Roy Lobo	2017	2018

- Edwin D'souza (2017–2022)

Name	From	To
Prakash Menezes OP	2018	2019
Ivan Joy Martis	2020	2021
Anson Dsouza SVD	2021	2022

- Frederick Mascarenhas (2022–Present)

Name	From	To
Ankith Dsouza	2022	2023
Arnold Mathias SDB	2023	Present

== Notable people from the parish ==
- Baptist Mudartha, former bishop of Allahabad, was born at Balegundi in Saantur village under Belman Parish. Ordained in Rome on December 12, 1942, He was the bishop of Jhansi Diocese from 1967 to 1977 and the bishop of Allahabad Diocese from 1977 until his retirement in 1988. He died and was interred in Allahabad in 2007 at the age of 95.
