= Oswald Lewis (bishop) =

Roman Catholic bishop

Most Reverend Oswald Lewis
- Bishop Emeritus of Jaipur
- Diocese: Jaipur
- Appointed: 20 July 2005
- Installed: 28 August 2005
- Term ended: 22 April 2023
- Successor: Joseph Kallarackal

Orders
- Ordination: 30 December 1972
- Consecration: 16 April 1998 by Cecil DeSa

Personal details
- Born: 30 July 1944 (age 81) Kemmannu, Madras Presidency, British India
- Denomination: Roman Catholic
- Motto: TO SERVE IN HUMILITY

Oswald Lewis (born 30 July 1944) is an Indian prelate of the Catholic Church who served as the first bishop of the Diocese of Jaipur from 2005 to 2023.

== Biography ==
He was born in Kemmannu village of Udupi district of Karnataka state, India, on 30 July 1944.

He was ordained a priest for the Diocese of Lucknow on 30 December 1972.

On 21 November 1997, Pope John Paul II appointed him bishop coadjutor of the Diocese of Meerut. He received his episcopal consecration on 16 April 1998. He was transferred to Jaipur before he was called on to become bishop of Meerut.

Pope Benedict XVI named him the first bishop of the newly created Diocese of Jaipur on 20 July 2005.

He was installed there on 28 August 2005.

Pope Francis accepted his resignation on 22 April 2023.
