= Christianity in Uttar Pradesh =

Overview of Christianity in the Indian state of Uttar Pradesh

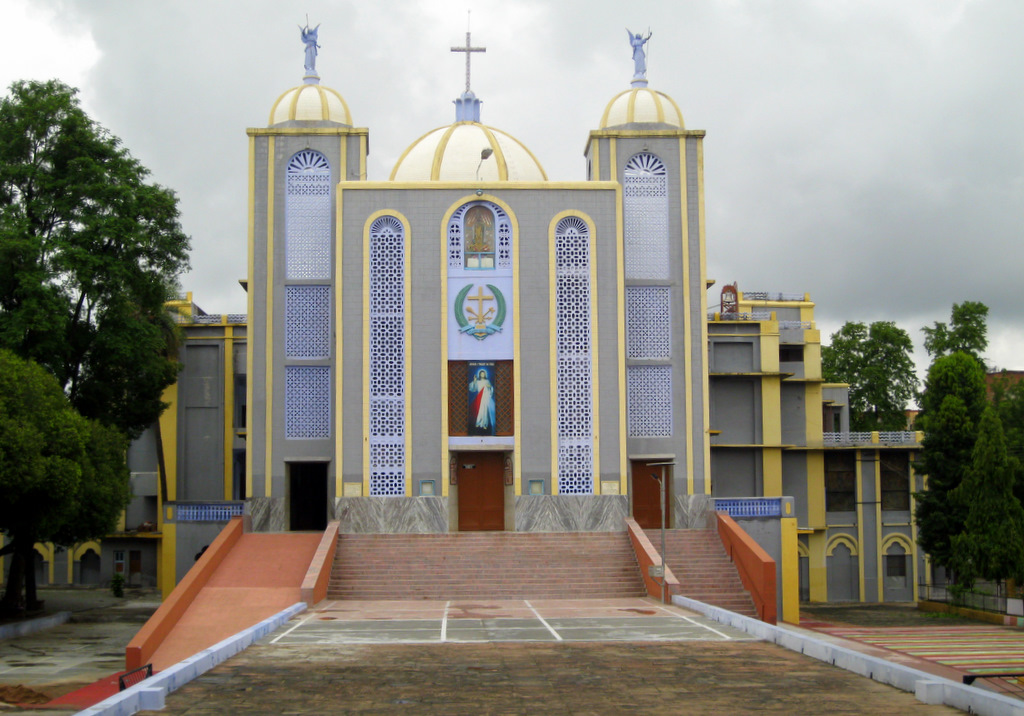
St. Jude's Shrine, Jhansi.

Christianity is a minority religion in Uttar Pradesh, the largest state of India. The Christians of Uttar Pradesh come under the territory of Lucknow and Agra Diocese of Church of North India (a member of the Anglican Communion) and of the Archdiocese of Agra (Roman Catholic Church). The Uttar Pradesh Christian Revival Church (UPCRC) was established in 2017 as a part of the Christian Revival Church.

Christians in Uttar Pradesh
Year	Number	Percentage
2001	212,578	0.13
2011	356,448	0.18

== History ==
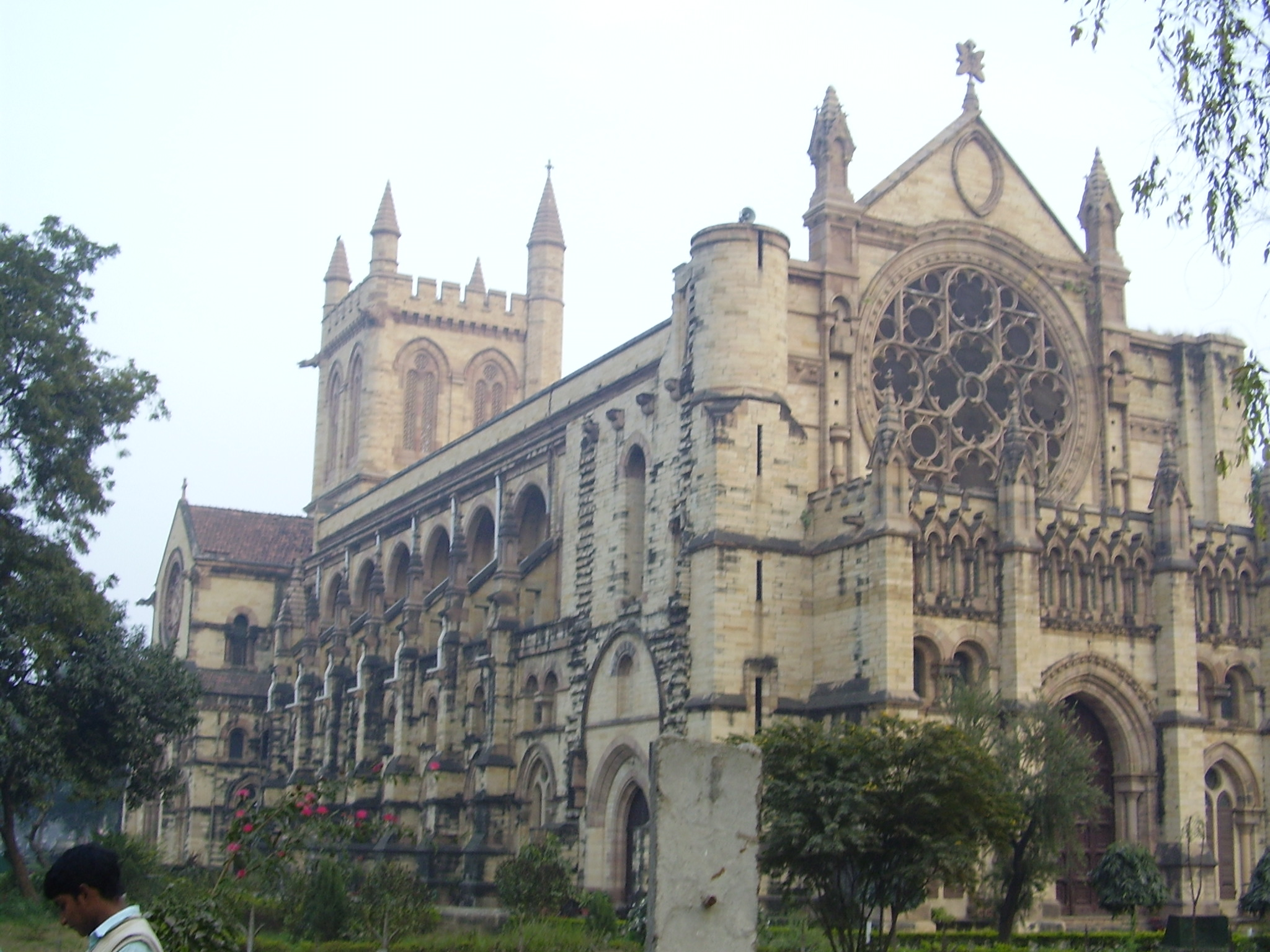
All Saints Cathedral, Prayagraj.

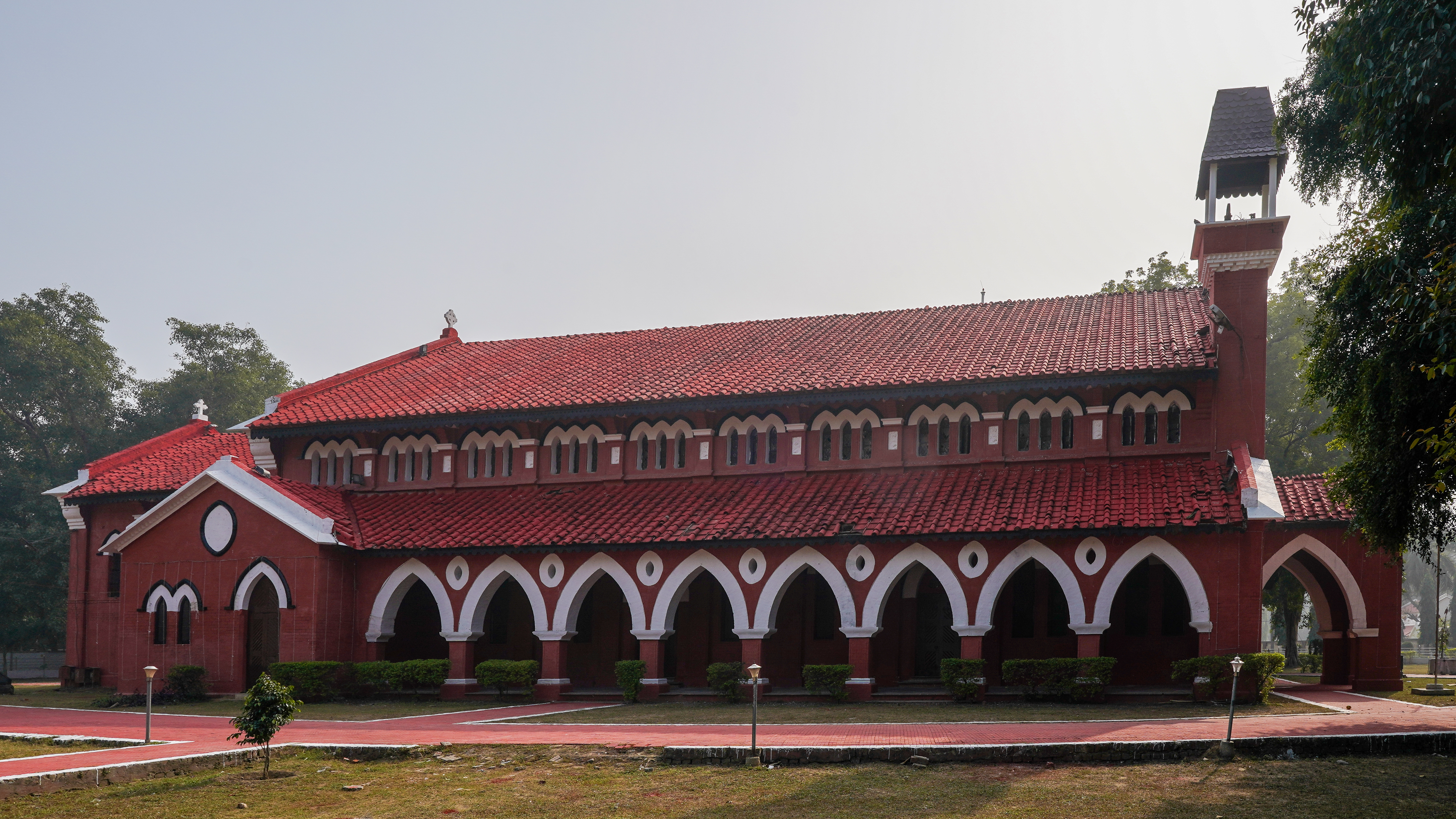
St. Thomas Orthodox Syrian Church, Prayagraj. Built in 1889 (136 years ago) out of wood as a Garrison Church in the Cantonment.

=== Mughal India ===
Christianity was first introduced to Uttar Pradesh during the reign of Mughal Emperor Akbar (1556–1605). Akbar was known for his secular theology. He sought out educated Jesuit Priests from Goa and gave them permission to bring Christianity to his people. However, Christianity in this state has long been a tiny, stagnant minority. In recent years many people are baptized, mainly in Protestantism.

=== British Raj ===
During British Raj many people converted to Christianity, most of them employed in Indian Army or Government offices. During the 1857 revolt, many Indian Christians were killed in the uprising. The revolters considered an Indian Christian to be British, so they saw this as an act of revenge on the United Kingdom.

== See also ==
- List of Christian denominations in North East India
- Christian Revival Church
