= Uchila =

Uchila or Uchil may refer to the following places in Karnataka, India:

- Uchila, Dakshina Kannada district
- Uchila, Udupi district

== See also ==
- Uchil (disambiguation)
