= Ignatius D'Souza =

The Most Reverend Ignatius D'Souza DTh
- Bishop of Bareilly
- Church: Roman Catholic Church
- Archdiocese: Archdiocese of Agra
- Province: Calcutta
- Metropolis: Calcutta
- Diocese: Roman Catholic Diocese of Bareilly
- See: Bareilly
- Installed: 4 October 2014
- Predecessor: Anthony Fernandes
- Previous post: Vicar General of the Diocese of Lucknow

Orders
- Ordination: 7 April 1991 by Archbishop Cecil DeSa
- Consecration: 4 October 2014 by Archbishop Salvatore Pennacchio
- Rank: Bishop

Personal details
- Born: Ignatius D’ Souza; 4 August 1964 (age 62) Basrikatte, Karnataka, India
- Denomination: Roman Catholic
- Parents: C.L. D'Souza^{(father)}, Lucy D'Souza^{(mother)}
- Education: Annamalai University; Pontifical Urban University; Pontifical Gregorian University
- Motto: Serve the Lord with Gladness

Styles of Ignatius D’Souza
- Reference style: The Most Reverend
- Spoken style: Your Grace

Ignatius D'Souza (born 4 August 1964) is the current serving bishop of the Roman Catholic Diocese of Bareilly, India.

== Early life ==
D'Souza was born on 4 August 1964 in Basrikatte, Karnataka, India to C L D'Souza and Lucy D'Souza.

== Education ==
Ignatius has acquired a Bachelor of Theology degree, a Bachelor of Arts Degree and Master of Arts (public administration) from Annamalai University. He also holds a licentiate from Pontifical Gregorian University in Biblical studies and Doctorate in Biblical Theology from the Pontifical Urban University.

== Priesthood ==
Ignatius studied at St. Paul's Minor Seminary and St. Joseph's Regional Seminary in Allahabad and on 7 April 1991 received priestly ordination from Archbishop Cecil DeSa for the Roman Catholic Diocese of Lucknow.

== Episcopate ==
D'Souza was appointed bishop of the Roman Catholic Diocese of Bareilly on 11 July 2014 and was consecrated by Salvatore Pennacchio on 4 October 2014.

== See also ==
- List of Catholic bishops of India
