= Diocese of Jaipur =

Roman Catholic diocese in Rajasthan, India

Coordinates: 26.8587°N 75.8145°E

Diocese of Jaipur Dioecesis Iaipurensis जयपुर के सूबा
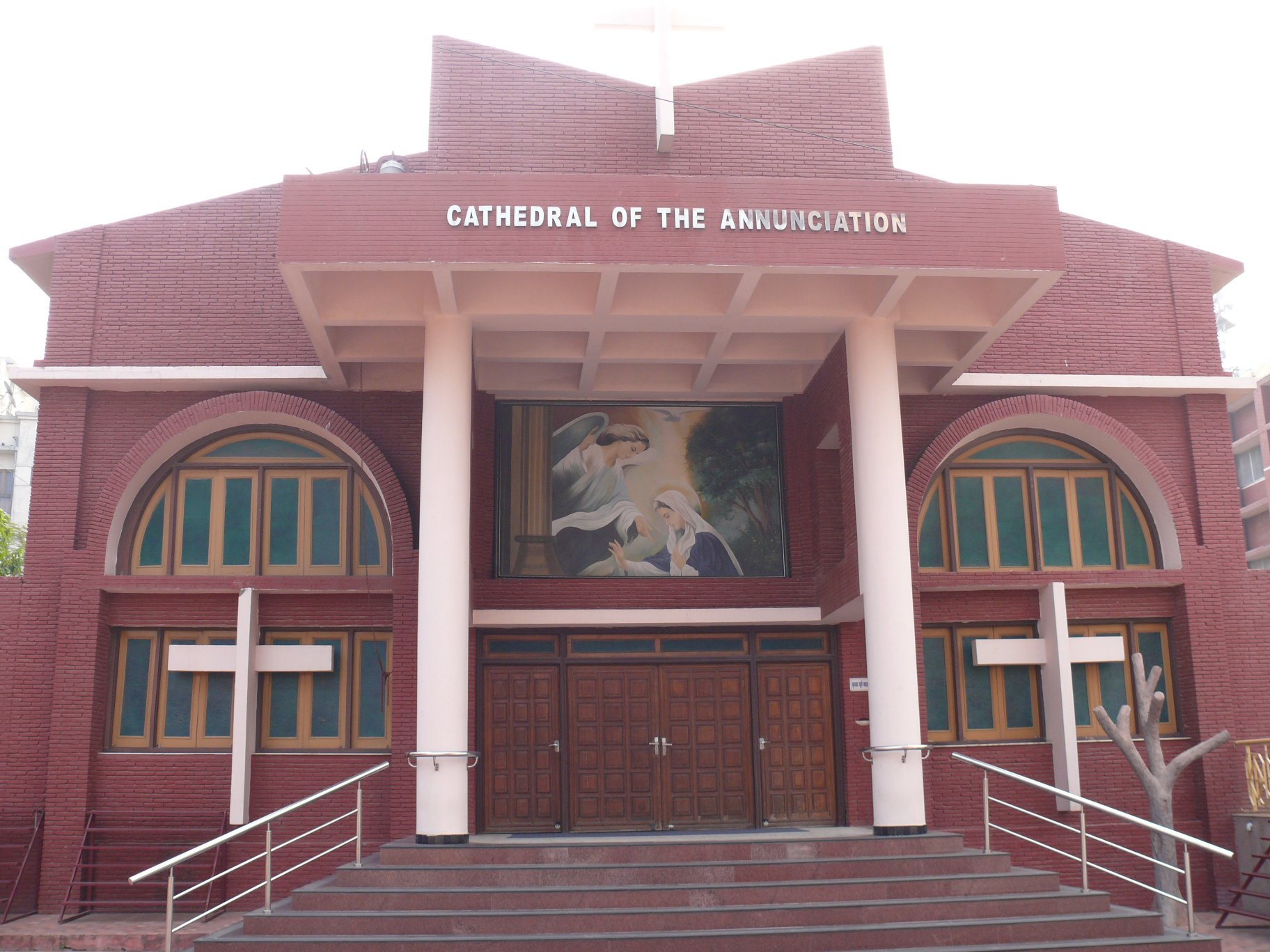
- The Cathedral of Our Lady of the Annunciation in Jaipur

Location
- Country: India
- Ecclesiastical province: Agra
- Metropolitan: Agra

Statistics
- Area: 129,060 km^{2} (49,830 sq mi)
- Population: Total; Catholics: (as of 2006); 25,828,271; 4,096 (0.0%)

Information
- Denomination: Catholic
- Sui iuris church: Latin Church
- Rite: Roman Rite
- Established: 20 July 2005
- Cathedral: Cathedral of Our Lady of the Annunciation in Jaipur
- Patron saint: Our Lady of the Annunciation

Current leadership
- Pope: Leo XIV
- Bishop: Joseph Kallarackal
- Metropolitan Archbishop: Raphy Manjaly
- Bishops emeritus: Oswald Lewis

Map
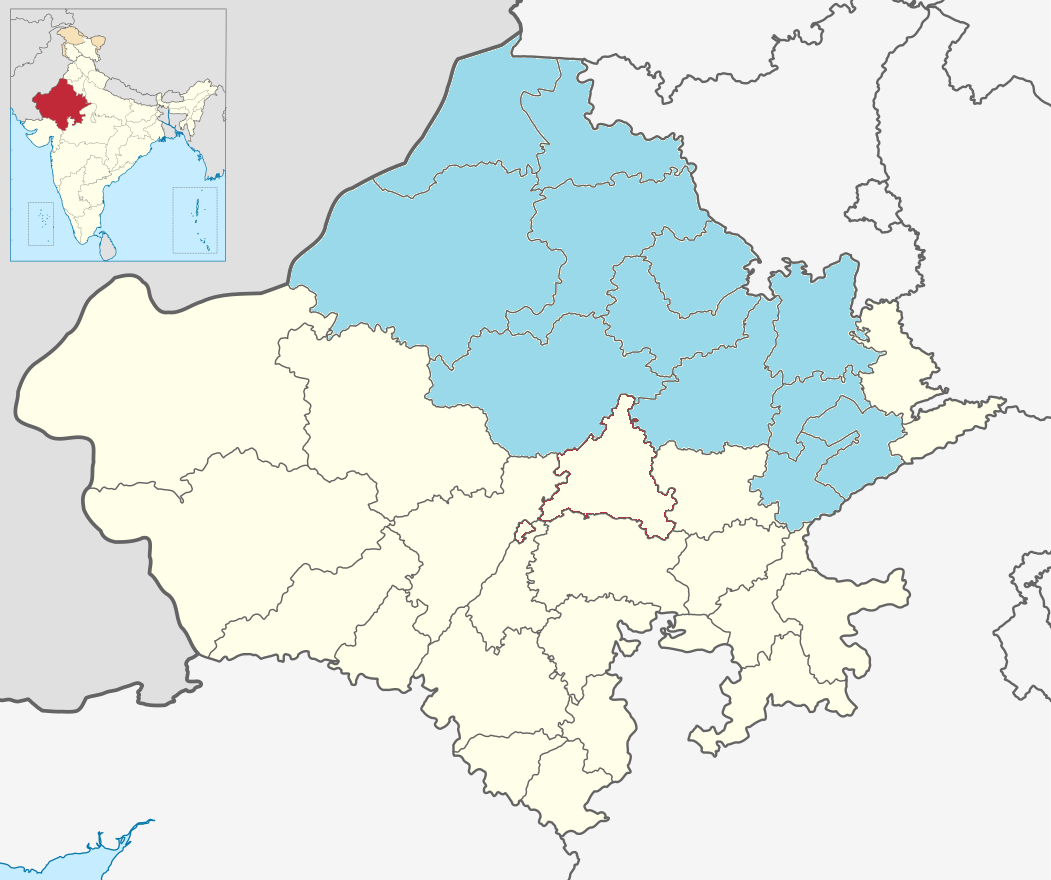

The Roman Catholic Diocese of Jaipur (Dioecesis Iaipurensis) in India was created on 20 July 2005, when the Diocese of Ajmer and Jaipur was split. It is a suffragan diocese of the Archdiocese of Agra. The parish church Our Lady of the Annunciation at Malviya Nagar is now the cathedral for the diocese.

The diocese covers 21 districts of the state of Rajasthan. Neighboring dioceses are the Diocese of Ajmer to the south, the Archdiocese of Delhi, the Diocese of Jalandhar and the Diocese of Simla-Chandigarh to the north, the Archdiocese of Agra and the Diocese of Gwalior to the east and Pakistan to the west.

== Leadership ==
- Oswald Lewis (20 July 2005 – 22 April 2023)
- Joseph Kallarackal (22 April 2023 – present)
