= Gilbert Blaize Rego =

Roman Catholic Bishop (1921–2012)

- Bishop of the Diocese of Simla and Chandigarh (emeritus)
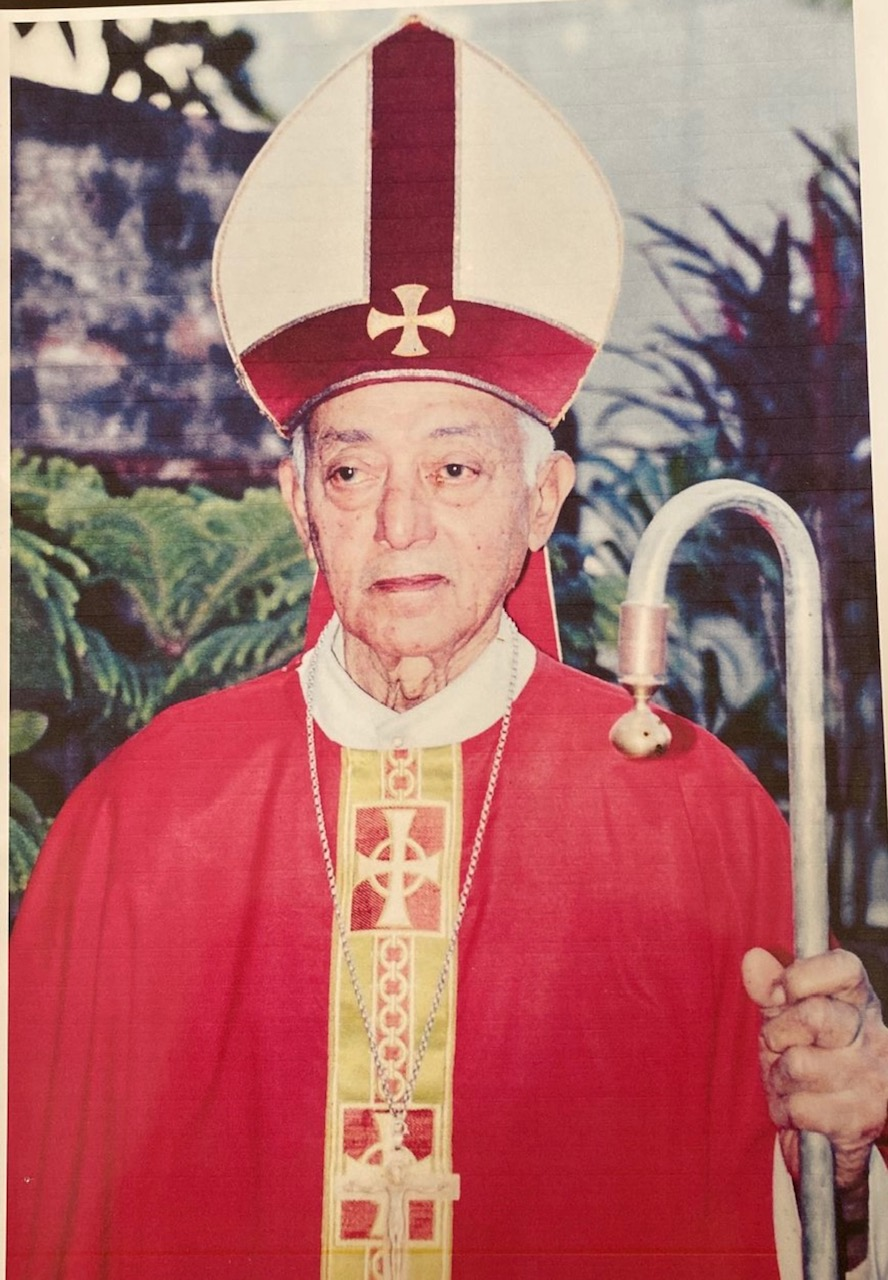
- Church: Roman Catholic Church
- Diocese: Simla and Chandigarh
- See: Diocese of Simla and Chandigarh
- In office: 1971–1999
- Retired: 10 November 1999
- Predecessor: Alfred Fernández
- Successor: Gerald John Mathias
- Previous post: Prelate

Orders
- Ordination: 3 December 1953

Personal details
- Born: 3 September 1921 Mumbai, India
- Died: 21 June 2012 (aged 90) Mumbai, India

Gilbert Blaize Rego (3 September 1921 – 21 June 2012) was an Indian Prelate of the Roman Catholic Church. He was ordained as a priest at 32 years of age in 1953, and he served for 18 years before being ordained as a bishop of the Diocese of Shimla-Chandigarh, India at age 50, in 1971. As a new bishop, his presence was needed in the new city of Chandigarh when he undertook the decision to shift the residence from the headquarters of Shimla to Chandigarh, even though it lacked a physical church. Rego fulfilled the holy orders, representing the catholic church in its doctrines as he shepherded the new flocks. He sanctified the congregation, while he also governed and administered in church planting and missionary fields through his support and assistance to missionary groups under his pastoral guidance until the age of 78, when he retired in 1999.

Rego was seen as a bishop of the masses, a missionaries bishop dedicated himself to the church and the poor. In his retirement at the Clergy Home, Mumbai, the bishop Emeritus, suffered from Alzheimer's disease until his death at the age of 90 in 2012.

== Early life and education ==
Rego was born on 3 September 1921, into an affluent family of Anthony Cajetan Rego and Otilia Maria Rego, in Mumbai, India, of 10 children. He was raised in a devout Catholic home. Following his calling, Rego took the path of priesthood with the blessings of his parents as he set about fulfilling his vocation. He completed high school from St. Mary's school in Mazagaon, to St. Xavier's College, Marine Lines, then entered Diocesan, Bombay, in 1946. He was ordained a priest in 1953, he performed pastoral works, specifically choosing to serve in poor areas of Maharashtra. Rego headed to Canada to study in 1964 and further studied divinity in Rome.

== Priesthood ==
Rego was ordained a priest on 3 December 1953, at the age of 32 at St. Peter's Church, Bandra, and set about ministering in far flung areas where the poor lived. He was appointed and ordained a bishop to the Diocese of Simla and Chandigarh in 1971. When his predecessor, Bishop Alfred Fernandez, was transferred to Allahabad in 1970, Rego, who was a newly appointed bishop of diocese, borrowed a chapel hall from Carmel Convent School. Rego visited the mission centers to say the mass either by foot, a Jeep, or bicycle. He was also a pet lover, having owned few dogs, and he would also interact with playful monkeys that hovered around the church compound whenever he visited the hills of Shimla parishes.

The new bishop lacked sufficient tithes and priests were being borrowed from various places. Rego would later have two of the longest serving priests join him in 1973, late Fr. Baptist Gomes and Fr. Stephen Fernandes. Rego determined to traverse the beginning of his lifelong vocation, undeterred, unshaken at the prospect of an enormous tasks ahead, to lead, to build, to shepherd a combined of twenty six civil districts, over 83,560 km^{2}, under the new diocese. The Simla-Chandigarh diocese is the eighth largest area of Indian Christians in India.

Rego had faith that his ministry would be successful. Under his leadership, Rego was a "man of deep prayer, solid faith and undeterred resolve he brought hope, growth and brilliance to the face of the Diocese of Simla-Chandigarh.", in a tribute by Rev. Anchanikal.

== Episcopal ministry ==
Rego begun his tenure by opening, supporting and blessing in various ministries such as missions, missionaries, churches, schools and orphanage centers.

- Roman Catholic Mission, Talasari, where Rego chose to start missionary work as a young priest in 1954.
- Missionary of Dohad, Rego served amongst the poor in 1960.
- Rego, his heart set on missionary works from early years. His article on "A Program in Training Missionaries in Light of Vatican Council II", in 1967.
- Missionary of Talasari, his field work without any fanfare but guided by the spirit of service to the poor in 1961.
- Rego was the former Director of Caritas, New Delhi, India in 1967.
- Bethany Convent nuns in Solan. Rego invited the Bethany Sisters to run St. Luke's school (started in 1958), from which the sisters found a calling to service a new community by providing trade skills, training programs to those not academically inclined.
- Bishop of Chandigarh, Rego was elected to the newly formed Diocese of Simla-Chandigarh, in 1971.
- The mission stations of Amloh, Pathak, Majri, Jhundan, Devigarh, Rajpura, Ropar, and many more in Bhatinda, Karnal and Shimla surroundings.
- Mother Teresa Charity, Chandigarh, Rego invited the Missionary of Charity MC, to serve the poor children on 31 May 1976.
- In time, under Rego shifted the diocesan headquarter to Chandigarh, he built the much needed church, now an architectural landmark of the 'city beautiful' of Chandigarh. The newest, simplistic church with an enlarged holy cross for the congregation to gather for worship, the Christ the King Cathedral, in sector 19-A.
- St. Anne's Convent school, Chandigarh. Bishop Rego under the diocese founded the school in 1977.
- St. Peter's Academy, Patiala, inspiration and supported by Bishop Rego.
- Sophia Convent school, Panchula. Answering the request of bishop Rego, Mother General Jovita, formed the first community to run a dispensary for the poor, social work along with imparting education.
- Our lady of Rosary, Goa, was inaugurated by Bishop Rego, on 2 October 1986.
- Society of the Missionaries of St. Francis Xavier, Delhi province. Rego laid the foundation stone of the new school building of the society's 15 acres land, on 17 October 1993.
- Sisters of the Adoration of the Blessed Sacrament (SABS), Rego's generousity and supported given the sisters in their missionary work on their arrival to the Simla-Chandigarh diocese.
- Rev. Rego, was a voice of calm, courage and strength when the Christians were targeted, their secular rights of religious freedom by a section of the community. He led a peaceful protest to demand actions from the officials.
- Rego spoke out against violence on the nuns.
- The Mother of Perpetual Help Church, Bhurewal, Ambala, was built and blessed by Rev. Rego, in 1991.
- Bethany Convent, Samalkha, was inaugurated by Rego in 1998.
- Lifelong involvement in CBCI, as Chairman of Justice and Peace, youth, ecumenism and dialogue.

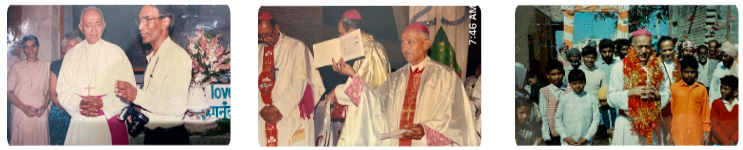
Bishop Rego at Christ the King Cathedra delivering mass, with Fr. Stephen at events, with Fr. Gomes out on mission field visit in India. (courtesy Fr. Stephen Fernandes)

== Ministerial legacy ==
The diocese of Simla-Chandigarh, under Rev. Ignatius Mascarenhas, in memory of him inaugurated the Bishop Gilbert Rego Charitable Clinic in Chandigarh, in 2021. Schools in India have honored him by bestowing the Bishop Gilbert Rego Memorial awards to its achieving students. He fulfilled his devotion to live a life as a man of God.

== Retirement (Emeritus) ==
Rego fulfilled the sacraments of the Holy order and was the longest serving bishop of the diocese, having served 29 years as the bishop and a total of 58 years until he retired on 10 November 1999, at the age of 78, as Bishop Emeritus of the Simla-Chandigarh Diocese. He received tender care by the Sisters at the Clergy Home and its director, in Bandra, Maharashtra, and from the archdiocese of Bombay, Rev. Oswald Cardinal Gracias.

== Death and succession ==
Rego suffered from Alzheimer's disease in his retirement at the Clergy Home. His death on 21 June 2012, at the age of 90, marked the end of a 'Golden Architect' of the Diocese of Simla-Chandigarh. The bishop's body was flown from Mumbai to Chandigarh, where a funeral mass at held at Christ the King Cathedra, presided by Rev. Vincent Concessao, Rev. John Mathias, Rev. Patrick Nair, the catholic community, and to the public at large on 24 June 2012.

The Diocese of Simla-Chandigarh had started from the newly created split from Delhi diocese with little resources, Rev. Gilbert Rego, had grown the diocese to hand over to successor, Rev. Gerald John Mathias, 30 parishes, 32 substations spread in 39 communities.
