= Isidore Fernandes =

Isidore Fernandes may refer to:

- Isidore Fernandes (bishop) (1947–2023), Indian Roman Catholic prelate, Bishop of Allahabad 1988–2013
- Isidore Fernandes (politician) (born 1951), Indian politician in Goa
