= Frederick D'Souza =

Indian Roman Catholic bishop

- Bishop of Jhansi
- Church: Catholic Church
- Diocese: Diocese of Jhansi
- In office: 4 March 1977 – 31 October 2012
- Predecessor: Baptist Mudartha
- Successor: Peter Parapullil

Orders
- Ordination: 1 January 1961
- Consecration: 25 April 1977 by Dominic Athaide

Personal details
- Born: 4 December 1934 Siddakatte, Kingdom of Mysore, British Raj, British Empire
- Died: 12 July 2016 (aged 81)

Frederick D'Souza (4 December 1934 – 11 July 2016) was a Roman Catholic bishop.

Ordained to the priesthood in 1961, D'Souza served as bishop of the diocese of Jhansi, India from 1977 to 2012.
