= Anthony Fernandes =

Prelate of the Catholic Church (1936–2023)

His Excellency The Most Reverend Anthony Fernandes DD
- Bishop Emeritus of Bareilly
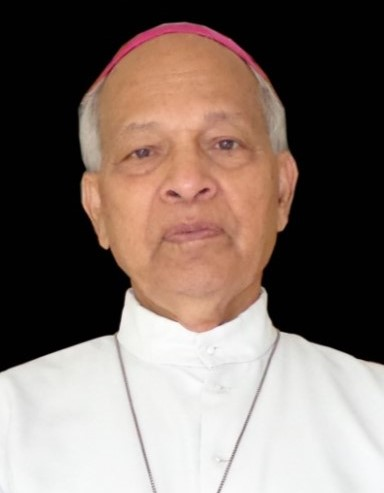
- Bishop Anthony Fernandes
- Church: Roman Catholic Church
- Archdiocese: Archdiocese of Agra
- Diocese: Roman Catholic Diocese of Bareilly
- See: Bareilly
- Appointed: 19 January 1989
- Installed: 29 March 1989
- Term ended: 11 July 2014
- Predecessor: None
- Successor: Ignatius D'Souza
- Previous post: Vical General of Varanasi

Orders
- Ordination: 2 December 1964
- Consecration: 29 March 1989 by: Cecil D'Sa; Patrick Paul D'Souza; Isidore Fernandes
- Rank: Bishop

Personal details
- Born: 6 July 1936 Kalathur (Mangalore), Madras Presidency, British India
- Died: 3 February 2023 (aged 86) Delhi, India
- Buried: Clergy Cemetery, Harunagla
- Denomination: Roman Catholic
- Parents: David Fernandes^{(Father)}, Bridgit Fernandes^{(Mother)}
- Motto: Witness to the Light

Styles of Anthony Fernandes
- Reference style: His Excellency; The Most Reverend
- Spoken style: Your Excellency
- Religious style: Bishop

Ordination history of Anthony Fernandes
History
Episcopal consecration
- Consecrated by: Cecil D'sa; Patrick Paul D'Souza; Isidore Fernandes

Anthony Fernandes (6 July 1936 – 3 February 2023) was an Indian prelate of the Catholic Church who served as the first bishop of the Diocese of Bareilly from 1989 until his retirement in 2014.

== Early life ==
Bishop Anthony was born in Kalathur, Udupi, on 6 July 1936, to David and Bridgit Fernandes.

== Priesthood ==
After his high school studies at Don Bosco School, Shriva, Anthony joined the diocese of Varanasi. He completed his initial formation at St Paul’s Minor Seminary, in Lucknow, which was followed by studies in philosophy and theology at St Joseph’s Regional Seminary in Allahabad. He was ordained to the priesthood during the Eucharistic Congress held in Mumbai on 2 December 1964.

Anthony worked as a priest in Varanasi and Gorakhpur for 26 years and felt deeply responsible for the poor and the needy in those regions. During his pastoral ministry, he worked ardently for the education of children and the empowerment of women.

== Episcopate ==
On 19 January 1989, Pope John Paul II took the momentous decision of erecting a new diocese—the Diocese of Bareilly—by promulgating the bull Indorum Inter Gentes. By this bull, six districts of the Diocese of Lucknow in the state of Uttar Pradesh, namely, Bareilly, Nainital, Almora, Pithoragarh, Shahjahanpur and Pilibhit, were carved out to form the new Diocese of Bareilly, and the church of St. Alphonsus was designated as its cathedral. The newly erected diocese was made a suffragan of the Archdiocese of Agra.

On the same day, the pope appointed and proclaimed Anthony Fernandes, the vicar general of the Diocese of Varanasi, as the bishop-elect of the newly erected diocese, by promulgating the bull Eodem Animi Pastoralis.

Fernandes' ordination as the first Bishop of Bareilly followed on 29 March 1989 at St Alphonsus Cathedral, Bareilly.

== Death ==
Fernandes died from multiple organ failure in Delhi, on 3 February 2023, at the age of 86. He was a priest for 59 years and a bishop for 35 years.

Catholic Church titles
Preceded by Post created	Bishop of Bareilly; 1989–2014	Succeeded by Ignatius D’Souza
