= Isidore Fernandes (bishop) =

Indian Roman Catholic bishop (1947–2023)

His Excellency The Most Reverend Isidore Fernandes DD
- Bishop Emeritus of Allahabad
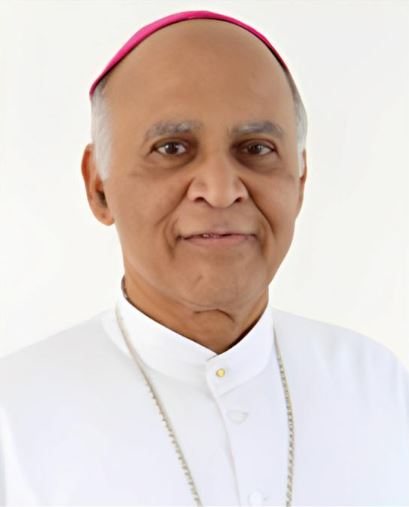
- Church: Roman Catholic Church
- Archdiocese: Archdiocese of Agra
- Diocese: Roman Catholic Diocese of Allahabad
- See: Allahabad
- Appointed: 5 May 1988
- Installed: 4 August 1988
- Term ended: 31 January 2013
- Predecessor: Baptist Mudartha
- Successor: Raphy Manjaly
- Other posts: Chairman, Proclamation Commission, Conference of Catholic Bishops of India (2007–2011)
- Previous post: Vicar General of Allahabad (1980–1988)

Orders
- Ordination: 29 October 1972 by William Gomes
- Consecration: 4 August 1988 by Cecil DeSa
- Rank: Bishop

Personal details
- Born: 2 January 1947 Kalathur, Madras Presidency, British India
- Died: 26 April 2023 (aged 76) Prayagraj, Uttar Pradesh, India
- Buried: St. Joseph's Cathedral, Allahabad; 25.4575°N 81.8444°E
- Denomination: Roman Catholic
- Parents: Casmir Fernandes(father), Lucy Fernandes(mother)
- Education: Papal Seminary

Styles of Isidore Fernandes
- Reference style: The Most Reverend
- Spoken style: Your Lordship

Ordination history of Isidore Fernandes
History
Priestly ordination
- Ordained by: William Gomes
Episcopal consecration
- Principal consecrator: Cecil DeSa
- Co-consecrators: Baptist Mudartha; Patrick Paul D'Souza

Isidore Fernandes (2 January 1947 – 26 April 2023) was an Indian prelate of the Catholic Church who served as the tenth Bishop of the Diocese of Allahabad from 1988 until 2013.

== Early life ==
Isidore was born in Kalathur, Udupi on 2 January 1947, to Casmir and Lucy Fernandes. His paternal Uncle was Anthony Fernandes, the first Bishop of the Diocese of Bareilly

== Priesthood ==
Isidore completed his high school studies at St. Mary's High School in Shirva, Udupi, Karnataka. He then joined the St. Paul's Minor Seminary in Lucknow and was then sent to the Papal Seminary in Pune, where he studied philosophy and theology. Isidore was ordained to the priesthood by Most. Rev. William Gomes, the then bishop of Poona, on 29 October 1972.

== Episcopate ==
Fernandes was appointed bishop by Pope John Paul II on 5 May 1988, and his episcopal ordination took place on 4 August 1988, at the hands of Most Rev. Cecil D'Sa, the then archbishop of Agra. At the time of his episcopal ordination, Isidore was one of the youngest Catholic bishops in India at age 41.

On Thursday, 31 January 2013, Pope Benedict XVI accepted the resignation of Bishop Isidore Fernandes, from the pastoral care of the Diocese of Allahabad.

== Death ==
Fernandes died from a heart attack on 26 April 2023, at the age of 76. He was a priest for 50 years and a bishop for 34 years.

Catholic Church titles
Preceded by Baptist Mudartha	Bishop of Allahabad; 1988–2013	Succeeded by Raphy Manjaly
