= Immaculate Heart Church, Karnal =

Church of the Immaculate Heart of Mary
- Location within the City of Karnal
- 29.709012°N 77.010464°E
- Location: Kunjpura Road, Karnal, Haryana -132001
- Country: India
- Denomination: Roman Catholic
- Website: www.simlachandigarhdiocese.com

History
- Status: Parish church
- Dedication: Immaculate Heart of Mary

Architecture
- Functional status: Active
- Groundbreaking: 31 July 1959
- Completed: 3 December 1961

Administration
- Province: Delhi
- Diocese: Shimla and Chandigarh

Clergy
- Bishop: Most Rev. Ignatius Loyola Mascarenhas

The Church of Immaculate Heart of Mary usually known as Immaculate Heart Church, Karnal is located in Karnal city of Haryana, India. It stands on Kunjpura Road near National Highway 1 of India besides the well known St. Theresa's Convent School. It has been declared as a historical monument by Indian National Trust for Art and Cultural Heritage. The Church of Immaculate Heart of Mary is dedicated to Blessed Virgin Mary, mother of Jesus Christ.

== History ==
The foundation stone of the Church of Immaculate Heart of Mary was blessed and laid by Rt. Rev. John Burke (B.A., L.L.D., D.D.), Bishop of Shimla on 26 August 1962. The Church of Immaculate Heart of Mary was blessed by Rt. Revd. Mons. Alfred Fernandez (D.D.) Bishop of Shimla and Chandigarh on 22 August 1968.

== Architecture ==
The church is built in Victorian style of architecture. The main structure consists of an altar, a baptistry, a pulpit and two vestries. The pulpit of the church is adorned with velvet curtains. The floor of the church is made up of geometrical tiles. A ground is also located at the back of the church for ceremonial purposes.

== Structures ==
The main hall cover an area of 1325 square feet and can accommodate around 40 people. The walls of the hall are 2 feet thick. The bell is another feature of the church.

== Grotto ==
There is a grotto of Mary at the entrance of the church boundary.

== Administration ==
The church is a Latin Rite church administered by Roman Catholic Diocese of Simla and Chandigarh, an archdiocese of the Catholic Church in India.

== Parish Members ==
There are 100 families, totalling 500 people. The Catholic devotees consist of people from various regions of India such as Jharkhand, Punjab, South India etc. apart from local Christians who settled locally for reason of employment.

== Parish Council ==
There is also a parish council of the church whose members take decisions regarding the welfare of Church people; the decisions regarding feast celebration, organisation of camps are taken with the consent of parish members. Representatives from All India Christian Council are also invited when taking major decisions. A monthly meeting is held for this purpose.

President
Secretary
Cashier
Member
Member
Member
Member

== Mahila Mandal ==
To empower the women of the parish, the church has set up a welfare group for women which enables women in strengthening them morally and financially by a committee system.

President	Mrs. Claudia Minj
Secretary	Mrs. Sumela Dungdung
Cashier	Mrs. Annamma Rajan
Member	
Member	
Member	
Member	

== Youth ==
Indian Catholic Youth Movement being the apex body under the auspices of Catholic Bishops' Conference of India works for the development of Christian youth helps the upcoming Christian youth various seminars, Retreat camps are simultaneously organised for and by youth with the helping hands of parish council members. The function of the youth is to provide their services at times of social services at church as choir, musician, church decoration etc. Duties are rotated among the members of group and hence responsible ones are nominated as leaders for the group.

Area President
Secretary
Cashier
Member

== Priest in the service of Church ==
The current parish Priest are of Indian Missionary Society.

Year	Parish Priest	Asst. Parish Priest
2019	Rev. Fr. Sandeep Masih, IMS	
2017	Rev.Fr. Jeevan, IMS	
2013	Father Ashwin Lobo	Father Sumiran
2011–2013	Father Rupesh	Father Sandeep
2009–2011	Father Suchit Paul	
2005–2009	Father Amar	
