= Uchila, Dakshina Kannada district =

Uchila Someshwar Uchil
- Village
- Country: India
- State: Karnataka
- District: Dakshina Kannada

Languages
  - Official: Kannada
- Time zone: UTC+5:30 (IST)
- PIN: 575023
- Vehicle registration: KA-19
- Nearest city: Mangalore

Uchila, anglicised as "Uchil", is near Someshwara on the way from Mangalore to Talapady, India. In Uchila All the religions people we equal here. Uchila have, 407 Juma masjid in middle of railways track and in the middle of Arabian sea.

Another Uchila is near Yermal in Udupi Taluk on the way from Mangalore to Udupi where it has Mahalakshmi temple which is temple for Mogaveeras. Both are fishing villages facing the Arabian Sea.

== Economy ==
The primary occupation in the village is fishing, though trading and real estate are also common professions here. The natives have adopted the name of the village and use it for a surname. This act is not religion specific, Uchila being an example of Hindu and Muslim people living with each other sharing the same language and last name.

The language spoken is a blend of Kannada, Tulu, Malayalam, Coorgi and Tamil. Uchila is a common place of residence for retiring couples as more and more duplex houses are being built. There are also guesthouses in the area.

Uchils (natives of Uchila) worship the female deity, Bhagavathi, and have an annual festival to celebrate within the community.

There is also a Sri Vishnu temple own by Tantri family but served for public. The only Vishnu temple in the village. This is a very old temple which is renovated in the recent past. This temple is about 80 m above sea level, and there are views from the top of the temple. One can see Someshwara temple and Big Rock (Rudra Paade) from here.

Another dargah is there in the name of "Sayyed Arabi Sahidar Valiullah".
