= Diocese of Lucknow =

Diocese of Lucknow may refer to:

- Diocese of Lucknow (Church of North India)
- Roman Catholic Diocese of Lucknow
