= Ochil =

Ochil may refer to:

- Ochil (Scottish Parliament constituency)
- Ochil (UK Parliament constituency), county constituency, 1997–2005
- Ochil and South Perthshire (UK Parliament constituency), county constituency, 2005–2024
- Ochil Hills, a range of hills in Scotland
  - Ochil Fault, defines the southern edge of the Ochil Hills

== See also ==
- Uchil (disambiguation)
