= Ignatius Loyola Mascarenhas =

Former Roman Catholic bishop

- Bishop of the Diocese of Simla and Chandigarh
- Church: Roman Catholic Church
- See: Diocese of Simla and Chandigarh
- In office: 10 February 2009 – present
- Predecessor: Gerald John Mathias
- Previous post: Prelate

Personal details
- Born: 3 June 1949 (age 76) Mangalore, India
- Motto: JUSTICE, LOVE, HUMILITY

Ignatius Loyola Mascarenhas (3 June 1949) is a former Indian prelate of the Roman Catholic Church.

Mascarenhas was born in Mangalore, India. He was ordained a priest on 17 December 1977. He was appointed bishop to the Diocese of Simla and Chandigarh on 10 February 2009, and ordained bishop on 3 April 2009.

Pope Francis accepted his resignation on 12 April 2025.
