= Diocese of Bareilly =

Roman Catholic diocese in Uttar Pradesh and Uttarakhand, India

Coordinates: 28.3365°N 79.4266°E

Diocese of Bareilly Dioecesis Bareillensis बरेली के सूबा
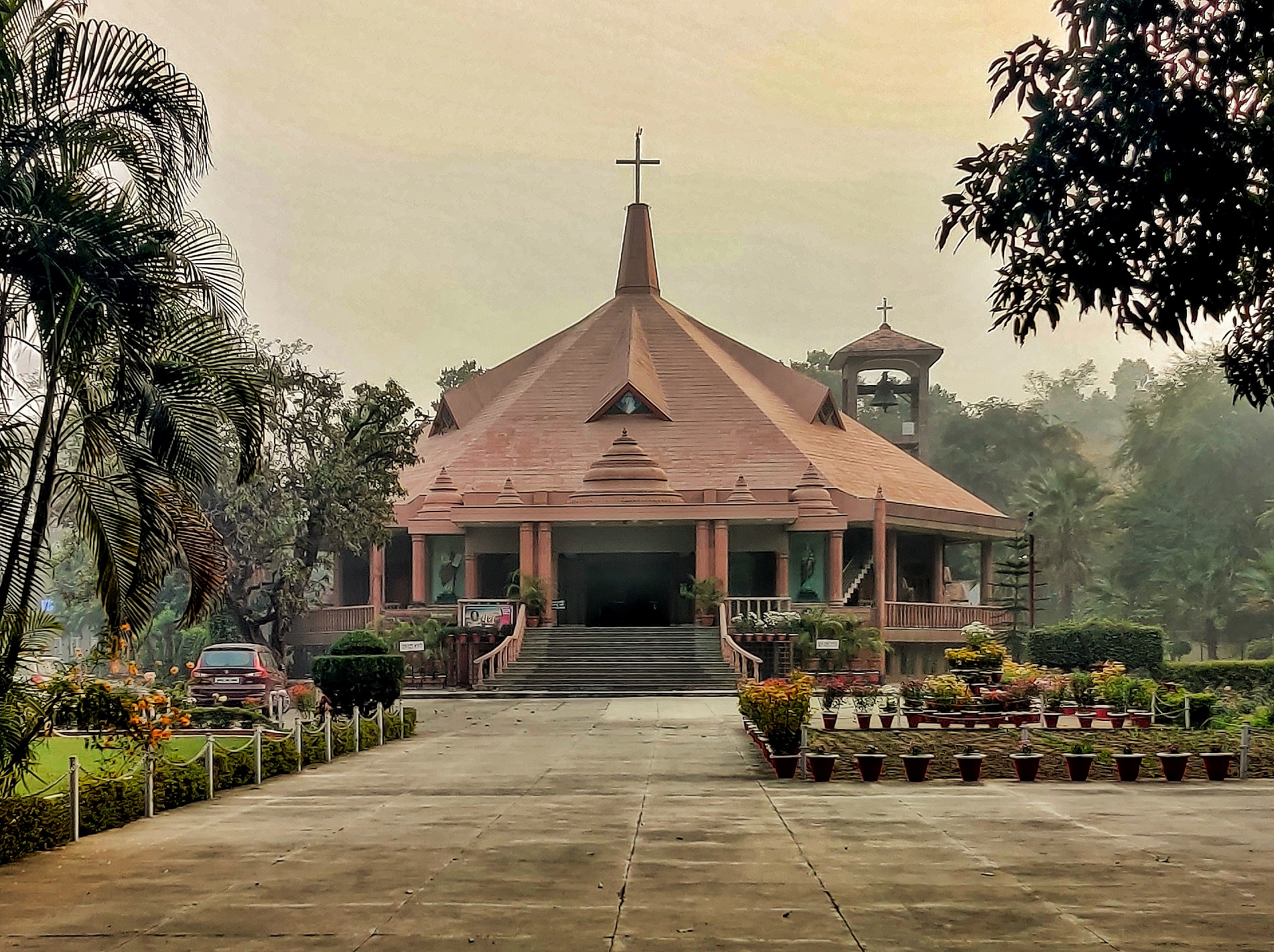

Location
- Country: India
- Ecclesiastical province: Agra
- Metropolitan: Agra

Statistics
- Area: 32,229 km^{2} (12,444 sq mi)
- Population: Total; Catholics: (as of 2016); 10,555,125; 6,985 (0.1%)
- Parishes: 55
- Schools: 19

Information
- Rite: Latin Rite
- Established: 19 January 1989; 36 years ago
- Cathedral: Cathedral of St. Alphonsus de Ligouri in Bareilly
- Patron saint: Our Lady of Nativity
- Secular priests: 52

Current leadership
- Pope: Leo XIV
- Bishop: Ignatius D'Souza
- Metropolitan Archbishop: Albert D'Souza

Website
- Website of the Diocese

The Roman Catholic Diocese of Bareilly (Latin: Bareillen(sis)) is a diocese located in the city of Bareilly in the ecclesiastical province of Agra in India.

== History ==
- 19 January 1989: Established as Diocese of Bareilly from the Diocese of Lucknow.

== Leadership ==
- Bishops of Bareilly (Latin Rite)
  - Bishop Anthony Fernandes (19 January 1989 – 3 October 2014)
  - Bishop Ignatius D’Souza (4 October 2014 – present)
