= St. Mary's Church, Noida =

St. Mary's Church
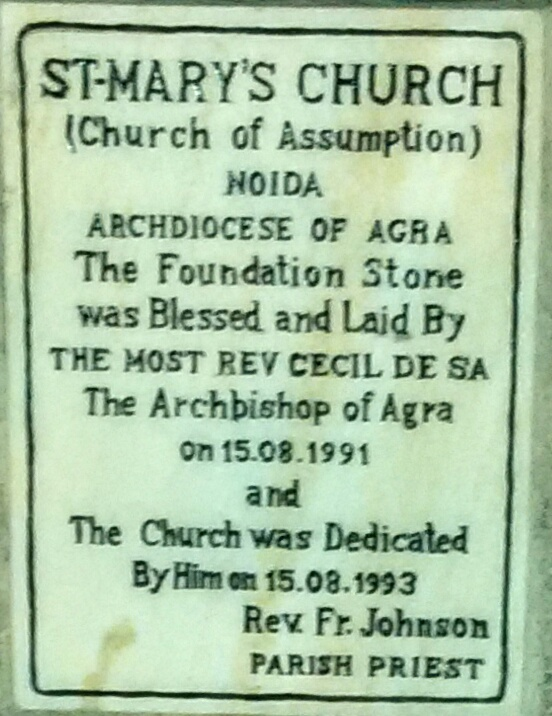
- Plaque on the entrance of the Church
- St. Mary's Church
- 28.5849°N 77.3603°E
- Location: Noida
- Country: India
- Denomination: Roman Catholic
- Website: www.stmaryschurchnoida.org

History
- Founded: 1991; 35 years ago
- Consecrated: 15 August 1993

Administration
- District: Gautam Buddh Nagar
- Archdiocese: Agra Archdiocese
- Deanery: Noida Deanery
- Parish: Noida Parish

Clergy
- Archbishop: Rev. Raphy Manjaly
- Priest: Fr. Santosh Dsa

St. Mary's Church is the first Catholic parish in the city of Noida, India and is dedicated to the Assumption of Our Lady. It comes under the Agra Diocese of the Roman Catholic Church. The parish lies on the north-western tip of Agra Diocese, bordering with the Delhi Diocese on the west and Meerut Diocese on the north. The present parish priest of the church is Father Joseph Dabre and the Assistant Priest is Father Stephen Paul, a member of the Society of the Blessed Sacrament. The parish comprises roughly 850 Catholic families.

== History ==
Catholics searching for jobs were living in the industrial city of Noida since its constitution in 1976 by the UP Industrial Development Act. Initially they went to nearby churches in Delhi especially Mayur Vihar for attending Mass. On the insistence of Noida Catholics, the priest from Mayur Vihar parish later agreed to celebrate the Mass on Saturday evenings in Noida as he had to be in his parish on Sundays. Due to the lack of a proper place, it was arranged in the houses of different people.

In 1984, Archbishop Cecil de Sa appointed Fr. Johnson Chiryankandath, then parish priest of Bulandshahar to survey the pastoral needs of Noida. He visited Noida often for that reason. In 1985, the parishioners approached the newly appointed priest in Mayur Vihar to take Noida into the pastoral care of Mayur Vihar parish. The priest expressed helplessness as he could do nothing without consent from both the Archbishops of Delhi and Agra. Further deliberation resulted in a meeting between the two archbishops and a resolution that the people of Noida would be included in the Mayur Vihar Parish until a dedicated priest was appointed by the Agra Diocese for Noida Catholics.

In 1986, Fr. Johnson was appointed as the parish priest for Noida by Archbishop Cecil de Sa, thus including Noida in the ecclesial jurisdiction of Agra Diocese. Till then, Noida was an independent parish.

In October 1986, Fr. Johnson applied for land to build a church. The Noida Authority allotted land in Sector-25, Noida. But due to objections from residents of Sector 25, the plot was returned.

On the archbishop's advice, Fr. Johnson approached Noida authority for a Mass centre. An H.I.G. flat in Sector-27, Noida was obtained in December 1987 and inaugurated and named as "Maria Sadan" in February 1988. Maria Sadan is still used as a Mass centre by the parish. From 1996 the Orthodox Christians living in Noida were permitted to use the Mass centre until their own church was constructed and consecrated.

The plot in Sector-34, where the church presently stands was allotted by the authority, in exchange for the originally allotted plot in Sector-25, in May 1990 after three years of pursuance by Fr. Johnson and the parishioners.

The foundation stone for the church was laid on 15 August 1991 by the then Archbishop of Agra Diocese, Rev. Cecil de Sa. Two years later the structure was consecrated for public worship.

== Geography ==
The church presently stands in Sector – 34, (A 71/A, Sector 34, Noida) just near the Ram Mandir. There is a local shopping complex where a Mother Dairy booth is also situated. The church is situated less than 1 kilometre from Noida Sector 34 metro station

== Major celebrations and events ==
- Christmas – 24 December midnight
- Easter – midnight celebration as per liturgical year
- Good Friday – as per liturgical year
- Parochial feast day of the Assumption of Our Lady and the Independence Day of India – 15 August
- NCYS painting competition – last Sunday of July or first Sunday of August
- All Souls Day – 1 November
- Feast of Christ the King – last Sunday of Ordinary Time

== NCYS ==
On 10 May 1990, the then parish priest Fr. Johnson Chiryankandath founded a youth group of the parish and named it Noida Catholic Yuva Sangh (NCYS). It initially consisted of 10 members, later increasing steadily.

Since 1996, the NCYS has been organizing painting competitions every year during church feasts in the nearby Assisi Convent School in Noida. Children from around Noida are invited, especially students from various schools in Noida. Although NCYS prefers pre-registration through participant schools, spot registration is also usually available.

Blood donation camps are also organised by NCYS on Good Friday every year, in association with local blood banks like Rotary Club. It is meant to be an act of following Jesus symbolically, as Christians believe that He also shed his blood on the cross for others.

== NCWA ==
The church is also one of the five major members of the Noida Christian Welfare Association (NCWA) which conducts various social activities for the welfare of the Christian community in Noida. It also organises annual Christmas processions though various areas of Noida stopping at all five member churches.

== Persecutions ==
There have been many attacks on the priests living here. On 20 October 2008, Conrad Dominic Xavier, a call centre employee, was found murdered in Maria Sadan in Sector- 27. Dominic was allowed to live in the Mass centre along with the church helper, as he had told the priest that he was new to the place and had no one to approach in the city. Parishioners suspect that the intention was to harm the priest but Dominic became the victim by mistake. The murderer, Shailendra Chauhan, alias Uday Singh, who later admitted the crime was arrested from Delhi by the Delhi Police. In January 2009, Chauhan had attacked and critically wounded Fr. Jipson of St. Mary's Church, with a poison filled injection. The man also admitted to having vandalised a church in Sarita Vihar, Delhi.
