= Belman, Karkal =

Belmannu Belman
- town
- Location in Karnataka, India
- Coordinates: 13°10′N 74°52′E
- Country: India
- State: Karnataka
- District: Udupi

Population (2011)
  - Total: 5,045

Languages
  - Official: Kannada
- Time zone: UTC+5:30 (IST)
- PIN: 576111
- Telephone code: +918258
- Nearest city: Udupi
- Literacy: 100%
- Lok Sabha constituency: Udupi Chikmagalur
- Vidhan Sabha constituency: Karkala

Belmannu, also called Belman, is a small town in Karkala taluk of Udupi district.

The place derived its name from the Kannada word Bellimannu which means silver (belli) soil (mannu).

Belmannu is famous for Shree Durga Parameshwari Temple, which is said to be built before 7th century AD. The oldest Kannada copper plate inscription was found under the foundation of this temple in 1952. The plate states that certain rights were given to the Belmannu Village Council which functioned from the Temple and probably looked after the functioning of the temple. As the inscription dates back to 8th century AD, the temple is believed to be older than the inscription.

Belmannu's St. Joseph Church was founded in 1896. It was formerly a part of the Roman Catholic Diocese of Mangalore but was shifted to the Roman Catholic Diocese of Udupi.

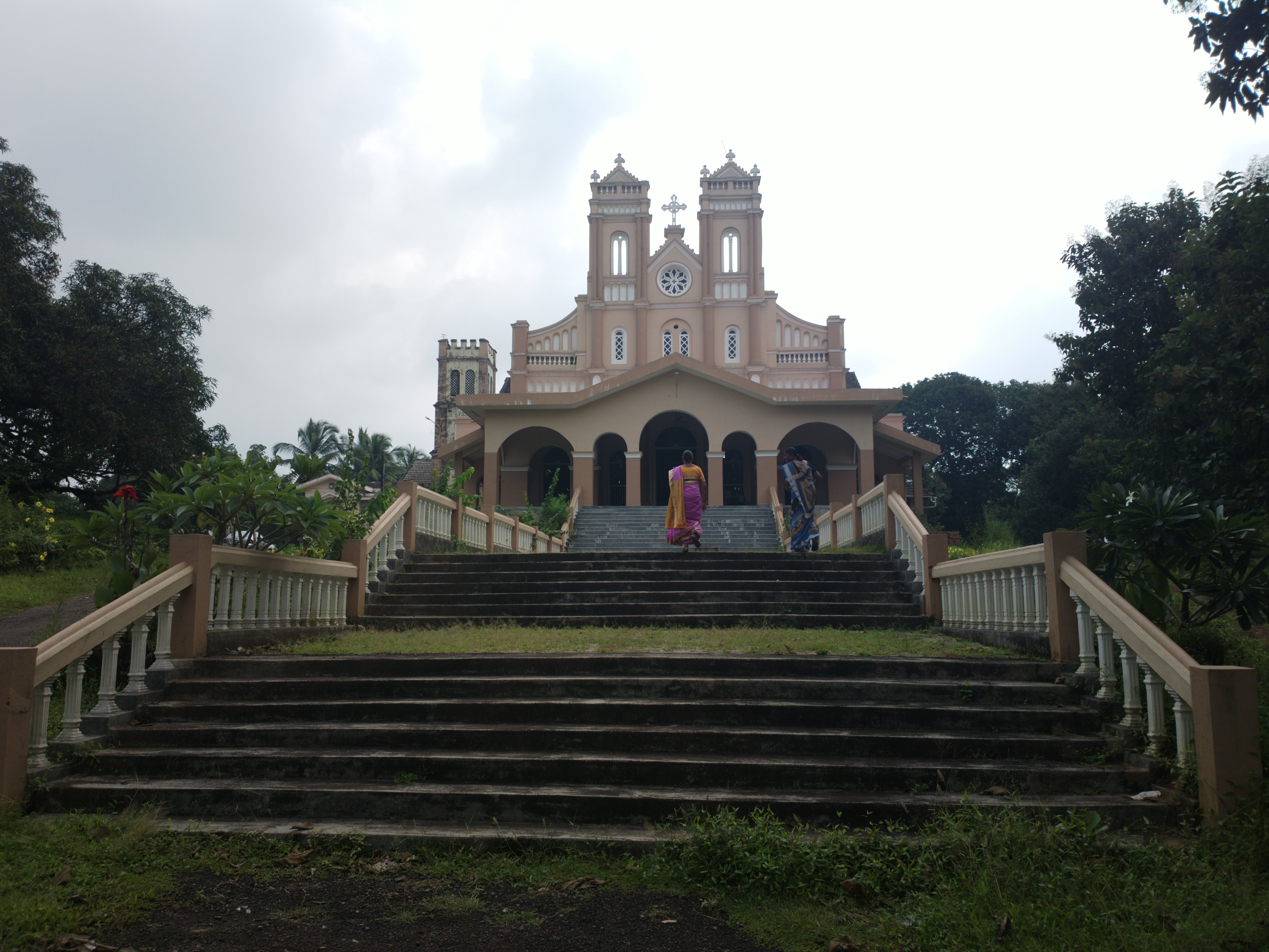
The St. Joseph Church in Belmannu

Belmannu is situated along the state highway connecting Padubidri and Kudremukh about 15 km from Padubidri.

Belmannu is the junction for the road that leads to Udupi via Shirva.

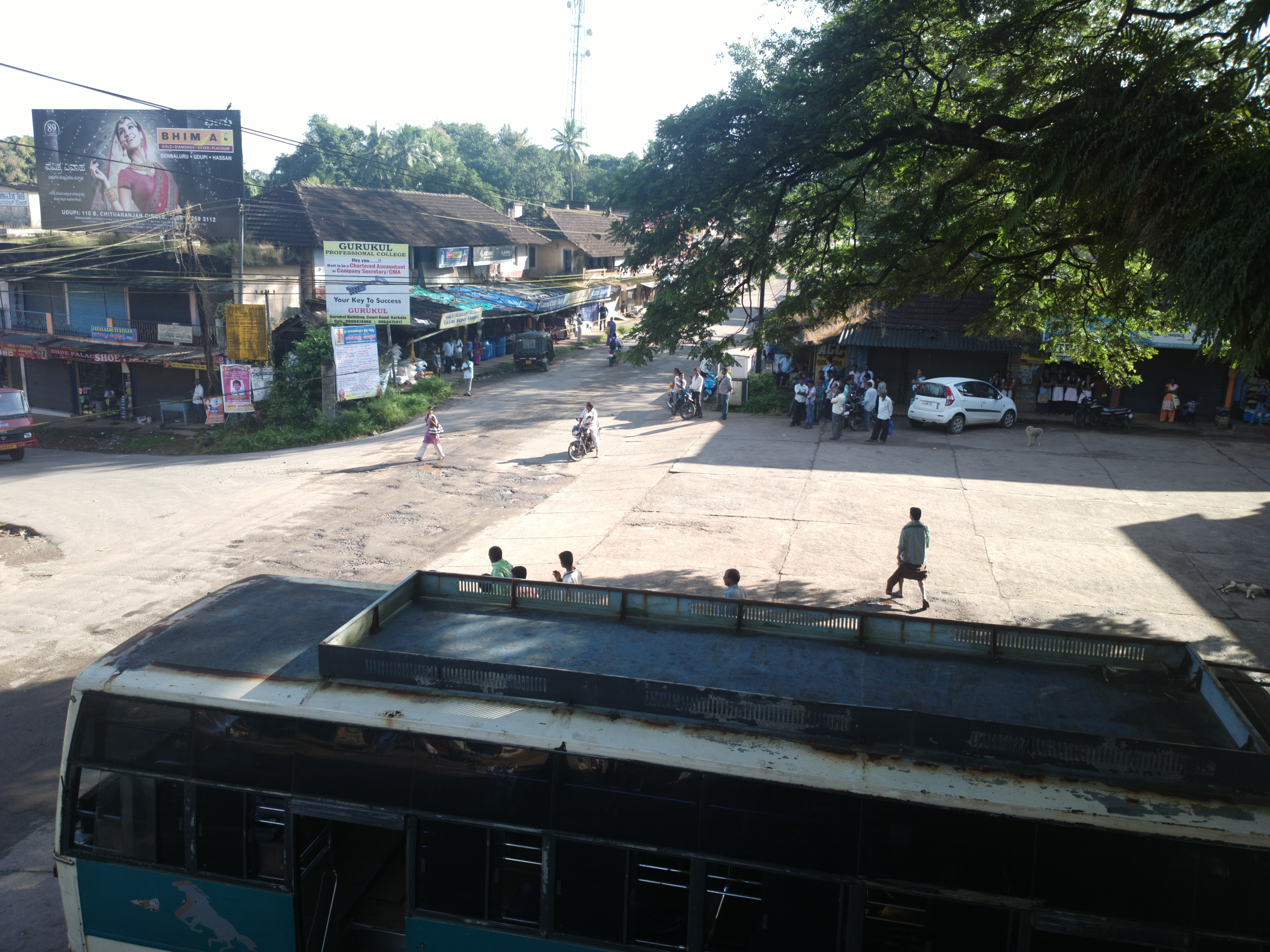
Belmannu bus stand

The population of Belmannu is predominantly Hindu. However, there is a sizable Christian population.

The village has two junior colleges and three St. Joseph Church administered schools. St. Joseph Higher Primary School and St. Joseph High School are Kannada medium schools based on the Karnataka State syllabus and St. Joseph English Medium School is an English medium school.

Nitte Engineering college is just 9 km away from Belmannu. Belmannu is well connected to its nearby cities; Mangalore, Udupi and Belmannu form a virtual triangle, with these three cities being the vertices. Udupi and Belman are 31.7 km apart and Mangalore and Belman are 36.1 km apart.

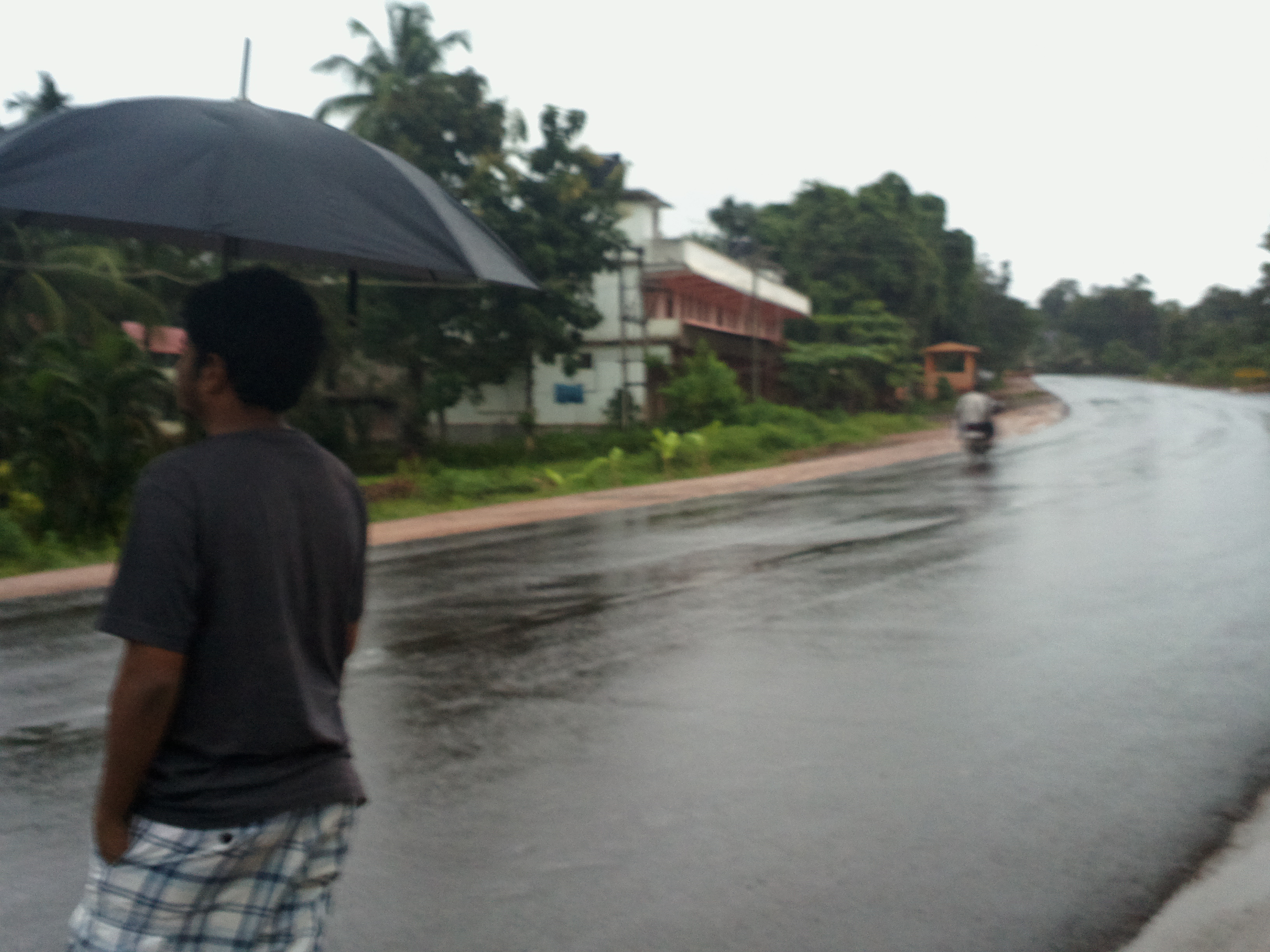
The state highway near St. Joseph Church in Belmannu

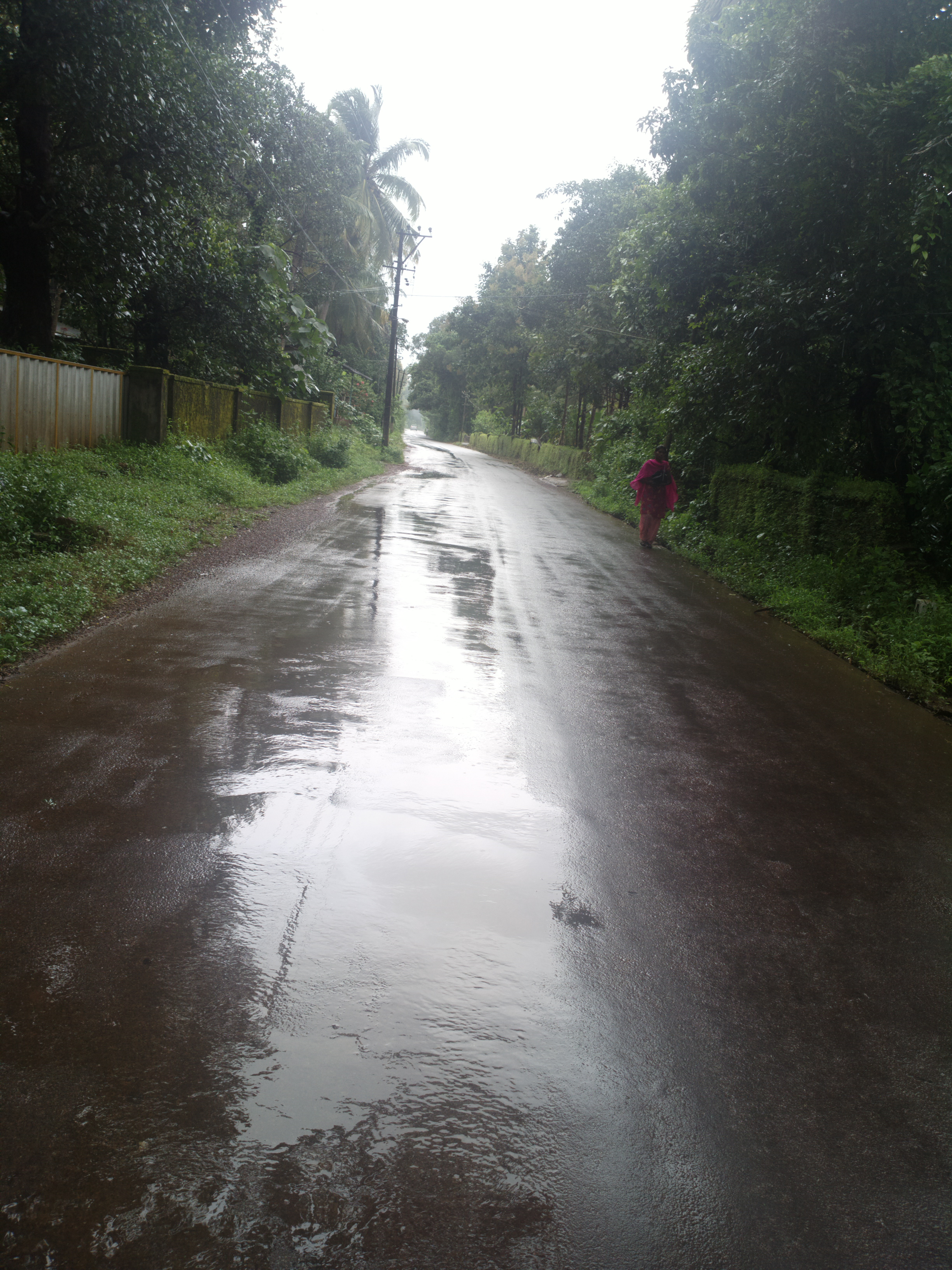
A road south to St. Joseph Church connecting Moodbidri and Belmannu

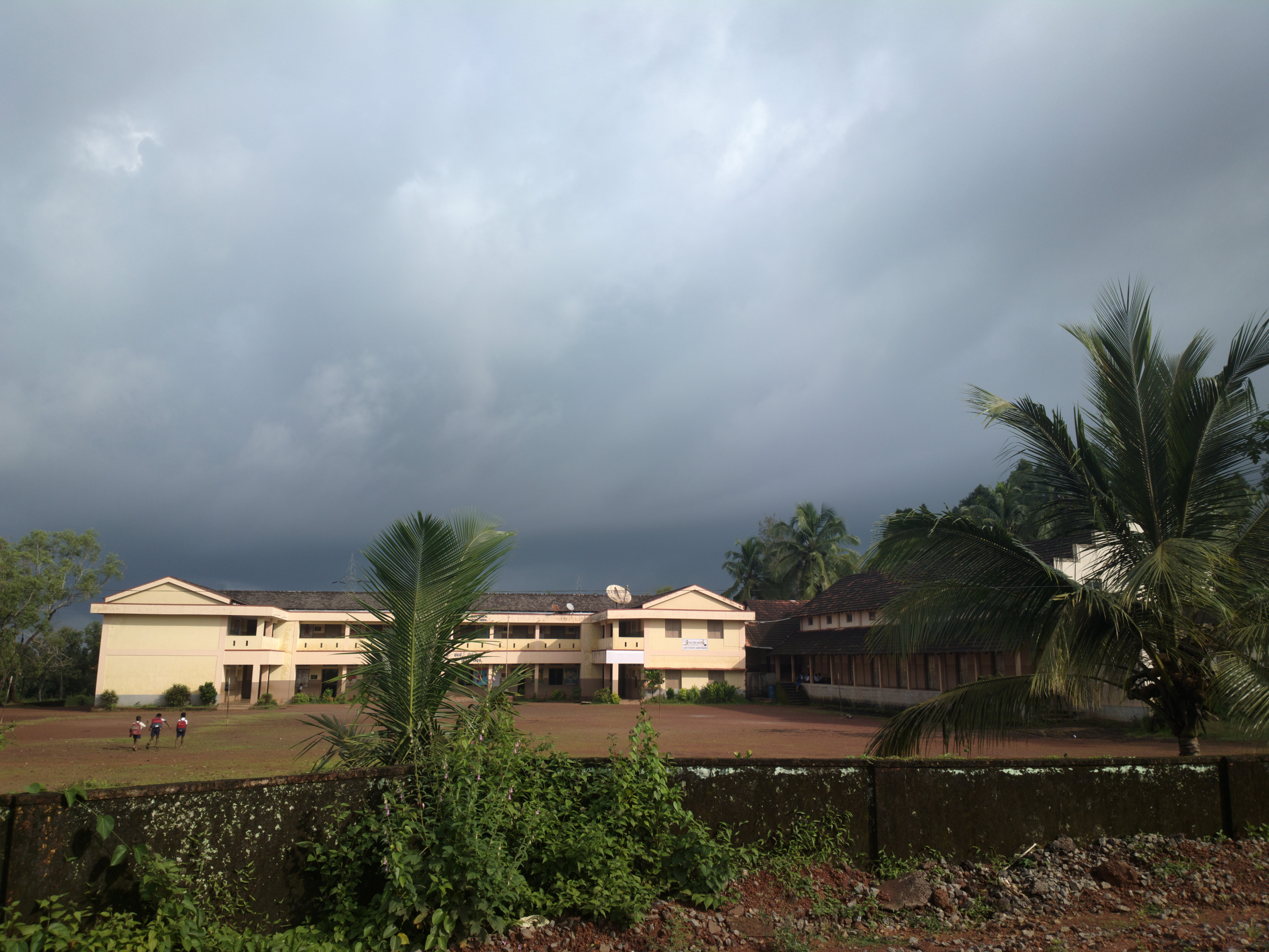
St. Joseph High School in Belmannu

.
