= Uchil =

The word "Uchil" is from old Celtic language meaning "the high ground."

In modern usage, the word "Ochil" has replaced the word "Uchil" and may refer to:

- Ochil (disambiguation)
- Ochil Hills
- Ochil Fault
- Ochil (Scottish Parliament constituency)

== See also ==
- Uchila (disambiguation), two towns in India
- Uchil, area in Kotekar village in Karnataka, India
