= Gerald John Mathias =

Indian Catholic priest

Most Reverend Gerald John Mathias
- Bishop of Lucknow
- Archdiocese: Agra
- Diocese: Lucknow
- Appointed: 7 November 2018
- Predecessor: Albert D'Souza
- Successor: Incumbent

Orders
- Ordination: 22 April 1979
- Consecration: 9 April 2000 by Alan Basil de Lastic

Personal details
- Born: 20 September 1953 (age 73) Kallianpur, Mysore State, India
- Denomination: Roman Catholic
- Education: Pontifical Lateran University

Bishop Gerald John Mathias is the current serving bishop of the Roman Catholic Diocese of Lucknow.

== Early life ==
Gerald was born on 20 September 1953 in Kallianpur, Karnataka, India He did his early schooling from St Joseph’s School, Kallianpur and high school from St Aloysius High School, Mangalore. He studied at St. Paul's Minor Seminary, Lucknow and also at St. Charles major Seminary, Nagpur. He also holds a Doctorate in Moral Theology from Lateran University, Rome.

== Priesthood ==
On 22 April 1979, Gerald was ordained a catholic priest. He was a professor of Moral and Pastoral Theology at St Charles ' Seminary. He was also the vice-Rector of St Charles Seminary and the parish priest of St Joseph's Cathedral, Lucknow.

== Episcopate ==
Gerald was appointed bishop of the Roman Catholic Diocese of Simla and Chandigarh on 22 December 1999 and on 9 April 2000 he was consecrated by Alan Basil de Lastic. On 8 November 2007 he was appointed bishop of the Roman Catholic Diocese of Lucknow by Pope Benedict XVI.
