= Diocese of Jhansi =

Roman Catholic diocese in Uttar Pradesh, India

Coordinates: 25.4410°N 78.5433°E

Diocese of Jhansi Dioecesis Ihansiensis झांसी के सूबा

Location
- Country: India
- Ecclesiastical province: Agra
- Metropolitan: Agra

Statistics
- Area: 29,418 km^{2} (11,358 sq mi)
- Population: Total; Catholics: (as of 2006); 8,315,000; 3,782 (0.0%)

Information
- Rite: Latin Rite
- Cathedral: Cathedral of St Anthony in Jhansi
- Patron saint: St. Jude Thaddeus

Current leadership
- Pope: Leo XIV
- Bishop: Wilfred Gregory Moras
- Metropolitan Archbishop: Raphy Manjally
- Bishops emeritus: Peter Parapullil

Map
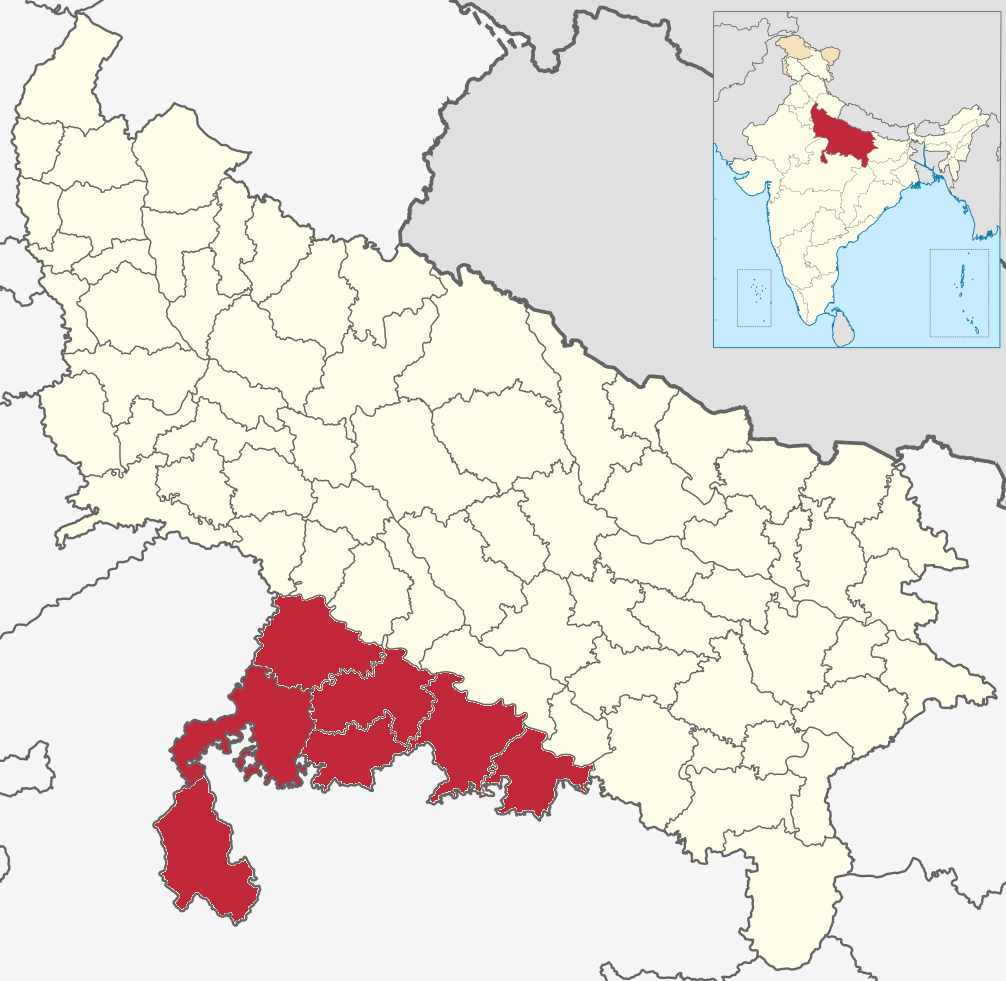

Website
- Website of the Diocese

The Roman Catholic Diocese of Jhansi (Latin: Ihansien[sis])) is a diocese located in the city of Jhansi in the ecclesiastical province of Agra in India.

== History ==
- 12 January 1940: Established as Apostolic Prefecture of Jhansi from the Diocese of Allahabad
- 5 July 1954: Promoted as Diocese of Jhansi

== Leadership ==
Prefects Apostolic of Jhansi

- Joseph Angel Poli, OFMCap (Bishop of Allahabad 1917–1946 and Apostolic Prefect of Jhansi 1940 – 21 January 1946)
- Francis Fenech, OFMCap (21 January 1946 – 5 July 1954)

Bishops of Jhansi

- Francis Fenech, OFMCap (5 July 1954 – 8 May 1967)
- Baptist Mudartha (29 November 1967 – 1 March 1976)
- Frederick D'Souza (4 March 1977 – 31 October 2012)
- Peter Parapullil (31 October 2012 – 28 December 2024)
- Wilfred Gregory Moras (28 December 2024 – )
