= Diocese of Simla and Chandigarh =

Latin Catholic diocese in northern India

Coordinates: 31.1053°N 77.1690°E

Diocese of Simla and Chandigarh Dioecesis Simlensis et Chandigarhensis शिमला और चंडीगढ़ के सूबा

Location
- Country: India
- Ecclesiastical province: Delhi
- Metropolitan: Delhi

Statistics
- Area: 83,566 km^{2} (32,265 sq mi)
- Population: Total; Catholics: (as of 2010); 18,670,000; 14,780 (0.1%)

Information
- Rite: Latin Rite
- Cathedral: Cathedral of St Michael and St Joseph in Shimla
- Co-cathedral: Christ the King Cathedral in Chandigarh
- Patron saint: St. Joseph and St. Michael

Current leadership
- Pope: Leo XIV
- Bishop-elect: Sahaya Thatheus Thomas
- Metropolitan Archbishop: Anil Joseph Thomas Couto
- Bishops emeritus: Ignatius Loyola Mascarenhas

Website
- Website of the Diocese

The Diocese of Simla and Chandigarh (Latin: Simlen(sis) et Chandigarhen(sis)) is a Latin Catholic diocese based in the cities of Simla and Chandigarh in the ecclesiastical province of Delhi in India.

== History ==
The diocese was established on 4 June 1959 as the Diocese of Simla, separating from the Metropolitan Archdiocese of Delhi and Simla, and renamed as the Diocese of Simla and Chandigarh on 12 May 1964.

== Leadership ==
Bishops of Simla and Chandigarh

- Bishop Ignatius Loyola Mascarenhas (10 February 2009 – 12 April 2024)
- Bishop Gerald John Mathias (22 December 1999 – 8 November 2007)
- Bishop Gilbert Blaize Rego (11 March 1971 – 10 November 1999)
- Bishop Alfred Fernández (13 April 1967 – 25 June 1970)
- Archbishop Joseph Alexander Fernandes (Apostolic Administrator 1966 – 13 April 1967)
- Bishop John Burke (12 May 1964 – 3 August 1966)

Bishops of Simla

- Bishop John Burke (4 June 1959 – 12 May 1964)

== See also ==
- Immaculate Heart Church, (Karnal)
