= Kemmannu =

Kemmannu Kemmannu, Hoode, Bengre
- village
- Location in Karnataka, India Kemmannu (India)
- Coordinates: 13.64°N 74.70°E
- Country: India
- State: Karnataka
- District: Udupi District

Government
  - Type: Kemmannu Grama Panchayath
  - Body: Ruling party as Congress

Languages
  - Official: Kannada
- Time zone: UTC+5:30 (IST)
- PIN: 576115
- Telephone code: 0820
- ISO 3166 code: IN-KA
- Vehicle registration: KA-20
- Website: www.kemmannu.com

Kemmannu-Hoode-Bengre is a small village in the Udupi District of Karnataka State. It lies on the western coast of Karnataka, along the Suvarna River.
