= Albert D'Souza =

Catholic prelate in India (born 1945)

The Most Reverend Albert D'Souza
- Archbishop Emeritus of Agra
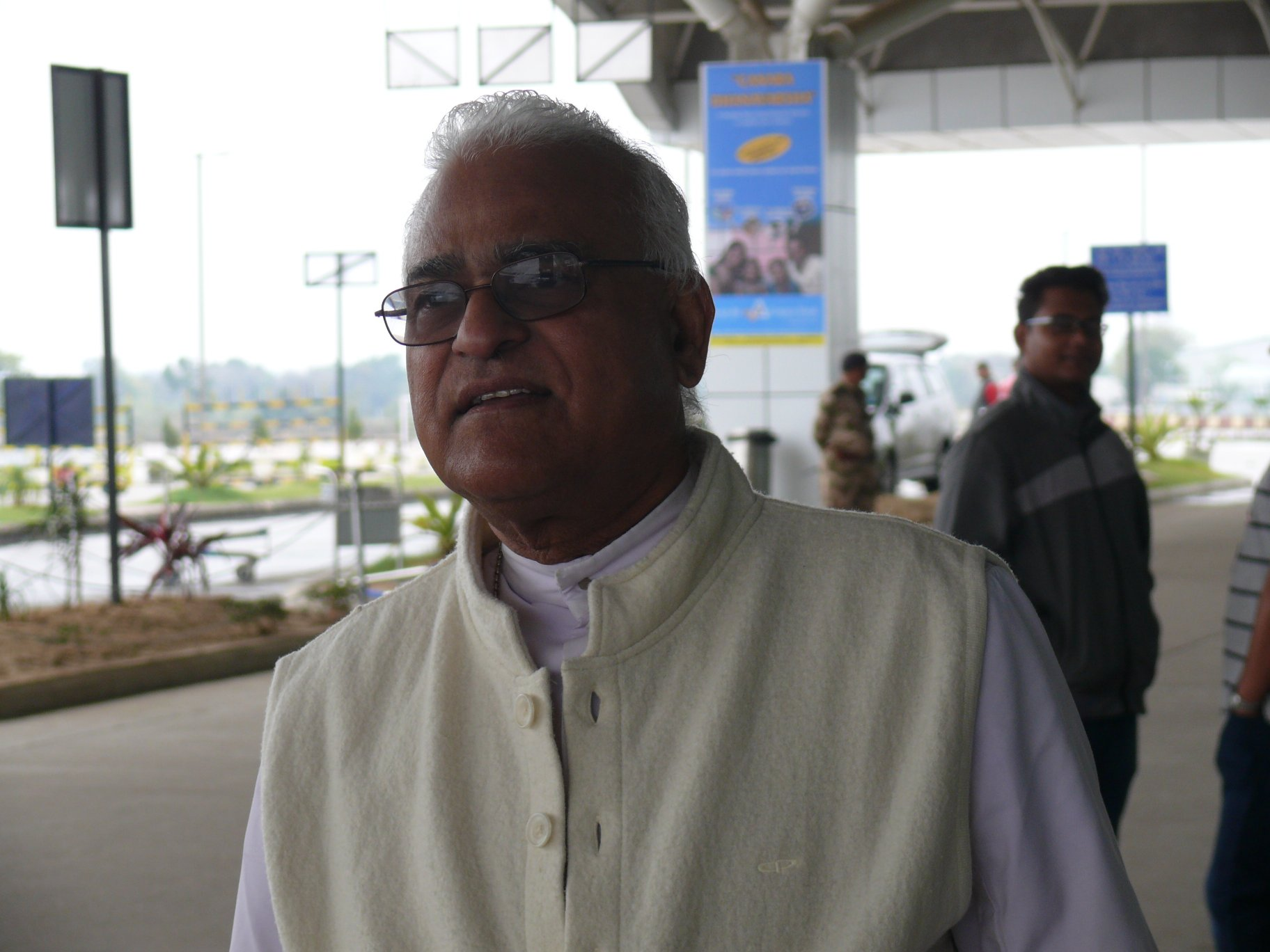
- Albert D'Souza, Archbishop of Agra
- Church: Roman Catholic Church
- Archdiocese: Roman Catholic Archdiocese of Agra
- See: Agra
- Installed: 16 February 2007
- Term ended: 12 November 2020
- Predecessor: Oswald Cardinal Gracias
- Successor: Raphy Manjaly
- Other posts: Bishop of Lucknow^{(1992-2007)}, Secretary General of Catholic Bishop's Conference of India^{(2012-2016)}

Orders
- Ordination: 8 December 1974
- Consecration: 7 February 1993 by Giorgio Zur
- Rank: Archbishop

Personal details
- Born: Albert D’Souza; 4 August 1945 (age 81) Moodubelle, Karnataka, India
- Denomination: Roman Catholic
- Residence: Agra
- Parents: Emmanuel D’Souza^{(Father)}, Magdalene D’Souza^{(Mother)}
- Education: St. Lawrence High School, Moodubelle. St Joseph’s Regional Seminary, Allahabad.
- Motto: Your Kingdom Come

Styles of Albert D'Souza
- Reference style: The Most Reverend
- Spoken style: Your Grace

Ordination history of Albert D'Souza
History
Episcopal consecration
- Principal consecrator: Archbishop Giorgio Zur
- Co-consecrators: Cecil DeSa; Alphonsus F. D'Souza

Albert D'Souza is a Catholic (Latin Church) prelate in India who served as the tenth Archbishop of Agra from 16 February 2007 to 12 November 2020.

== Birth and education ==
He was born on 4 August 1945 in Moodubelle, Mangalore, as the eighth child in a Catholic family with a dozen children. Four of his brothers are priests and two of them bishops. One of the brothers, Fr. Edwin D'Souza, is the pastor of Saints Martha and Mary Parish, Mississauga, Ontario.

He studied in church run St. Lawrence High School, Moodubelle.

== Clergical career ==
He was ordained a priest on 8 December 1974, and was appointed Bishop of Lucknow by then Pope John Paul II, on 21 November 1992. His episcopal ordination followed on 7 February 1993. Pope Benedict XVI appointed him Archbishop of Agra on 11 April 2007. He chairs the commission of the Conference of Catholic Bishops of India (CCBI). He also chairs the Agra Regional Bishops' Council (ARBC)

== See also ==
- Catholic Church in India
