= St. Jude's Shrine, Jhansi =

St. Jude's Shrine
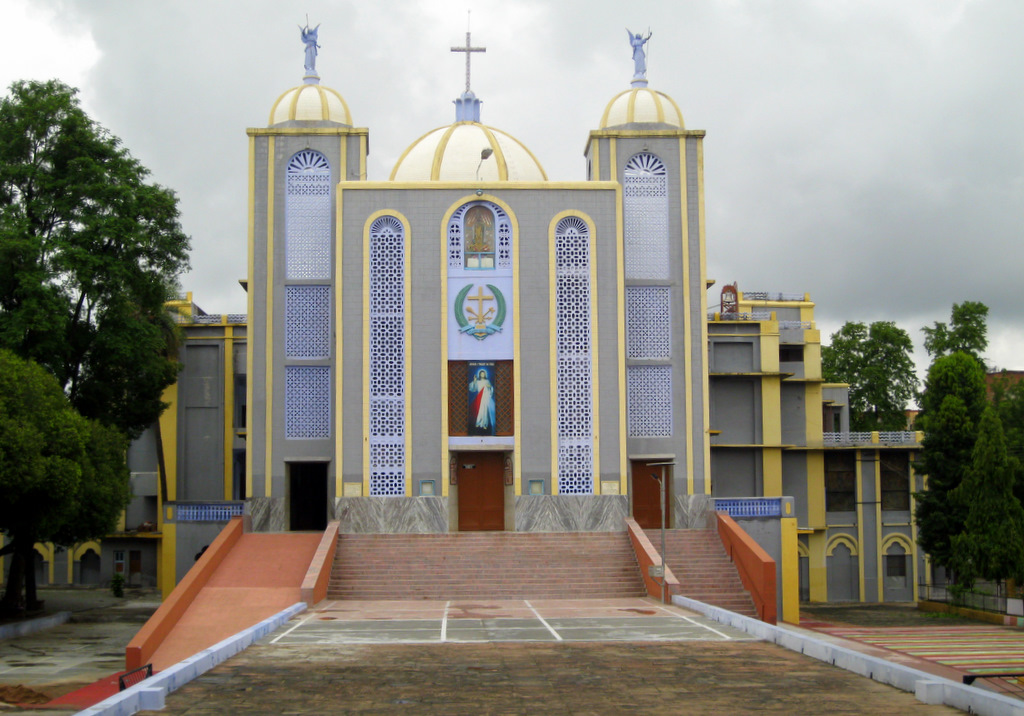
- St. Jude's Shrine
- Location: Jhansi, Uttar Pradesh
- Country: India
- Denomination: Roman Catholic
- Website: http://shrine.jhansidiocese.org

History
- Dedication: St. Jude Thaddaeus

Clergy
- Vicar: Fr. Oswil D’Souza (Goa)

St. Judes' Shrine is a Roman Catholic church located in Jhansi in the state of Uttar Pradesh, India. The Latin Rite shrine is devoted to St. Jude Thaddaeus and is part of the Roman Catholic Diocese of Jhansi.

== See also ==
- Roman Catholicism in India
