= Yermal =

Yermal Yerumal
- Village
- Location in Karnataka, India Yermal (India)
- Coordinates: 13°10′03″N 74°45′43″E
- Country: India
- State: Karnataka
- District: Udupi

Population (1980)
  - Total: 20,756

Languages
  - Official: Tulu, Kannada
- Time zone: UTC+5:30 (IST)
- PIN: 574119
- Telephone code: 0820
- Vehicle registration: KA20
- Coastline: 5.6 kilometres (3.5 mi)
- Nearest city: Padubidri
- Sex ratio: 52%M, 48%F ♂/♀
- Literacy: 75%%
- Lok Sabha constituency: Udupi
- Climate: Average 30 - 38 (Köppen)
- Avg. summer temperature: 39 °C (102 °F)
- Avg. winter temperature: 28 °C (82 °F)

Yermal is a settlement in Udupi district of Karnataka state in India, between Uchila and Padubidri on National Highway 66. There are two parts of Yermal, one is Tenka (meaning "south" in Tulu) and the other Bada or Badagu (meaning "north" in Tulu).

== Janardhana Temple ==
The Janardhana Temple, is a historically famous temple in Yermal. Every year, a jatra, locally famous as Yermaljeppu Kandevu Adepu Jatra is held at the temple, drawing a large number of devotees.

== Nearby places ==
- Adamaru
- Kemundel
- Nandikur
