= Uchila, Udupi district =

Uchila, Udupi Uchila
- village
- Location in Karnataka, India Uchila, Udupi (India)
- Coordinates: 13°11′15″N 74°45′16.6″E
- Country: India
- State: Karnataka
- District: Udupi

Government
  - Body: Gram panchayat

Languages
  - Official: Kannada
- Time zone: UTC+5:30 (IST)
- ISO 3166 code: IN-KA
- Vehicle registration: KA
- Website: karnataka.gov.in

Uchila or Uchchila is a village near Yermal in Udupi taluk in Udupi district, Karnataka, India.

== Location ==
It is on the way from Mangalore to Udupi, on National Highway 66, It is a fishing village on the Arabian Sea coast. Uchila beach is relatively uncrowded.

== Places of interest ==
Sri Mahalakshmi temple is situated here. It is an important site for the Mogaveera community.
