= Roman Catholic Diocese of Allahabad =

Roman Catholic diocese in Uttar Pradesh, India

Coordinates: 25.4577°N 81.8447°E

Diocese of Allahabad Dioecesis Allahabadensis इलाहाबाद के सूबा

Location
- Country: India
- Ecclesiastical province: Agra
- Headquarters: Prayagraj

Statistics
- Area: 45,215 km^{2} (17,458 sq mi)
- Population: Total; Catholics: (as of 2012); 32,644,000; 13,525 (0.0%)
- Parishes: 39

Information
- Rite: Latin Rite
- Cathedral: St. Joseph's Cathedral
- Patron saint: Saint Joseph
- Secular priests: 70

Current leadership
- Pope: Leo XIV
- Bishop: Most Rev. Louis Mascarenhas
- Metropolitan Archbishop: Mar Raphy Manjaly
- Vicar General: Rev. Fr Reginald Paul D Souza

Map
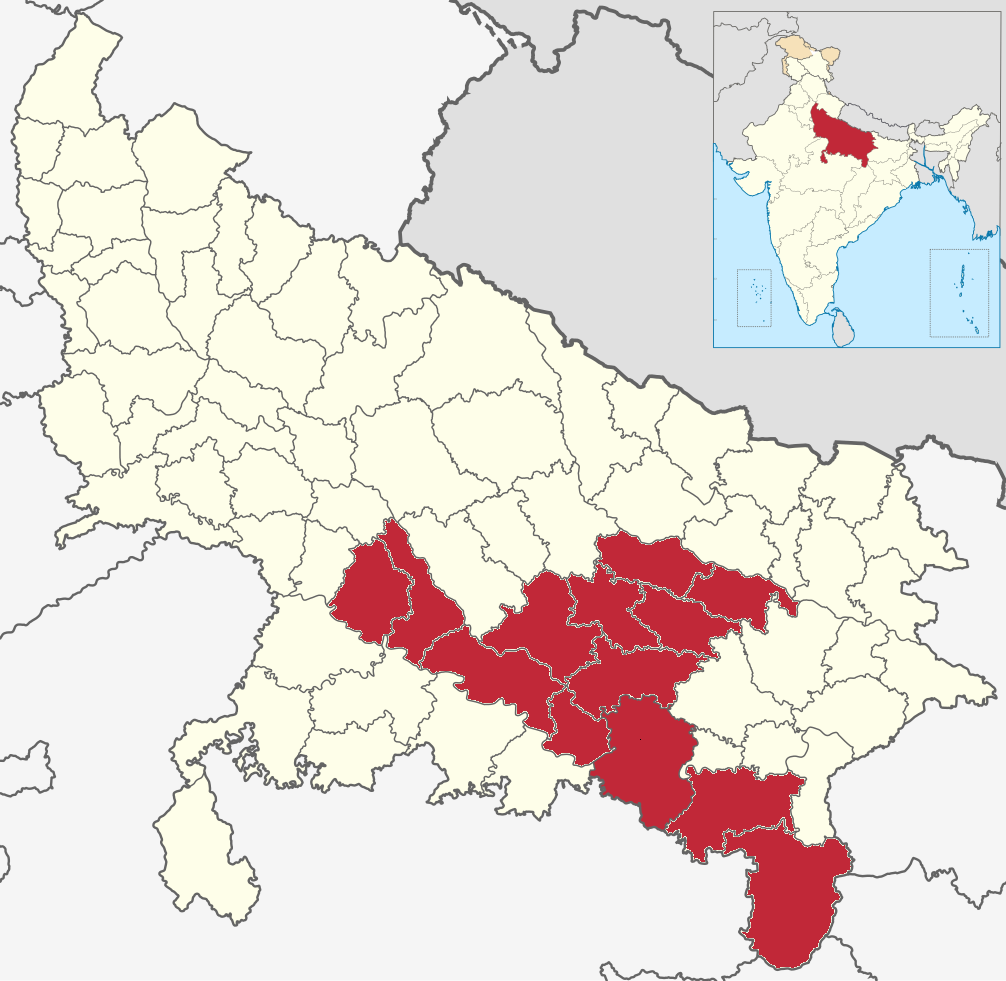

Website
- www.dioceseofallahabad.org

The Roman Catholic Diocese of Allahabad (Latin: Allahabaden(sis)) is a diocese with its see located in the city of Prayagraj in the ecclesiastical province of Agra in India. The Diocese of Allahabad is spread over 13 districts of Uttar Pradesh. These are Ambedkarnagar, Amethi, Ayodhya, Fatehpur, Kanpur City, Kanpur Dehat, Kaushambi, Mirzapur, Pratapgarh, Prayagraj, Rae Bareli, Sonbhadra, and Sultanpur.

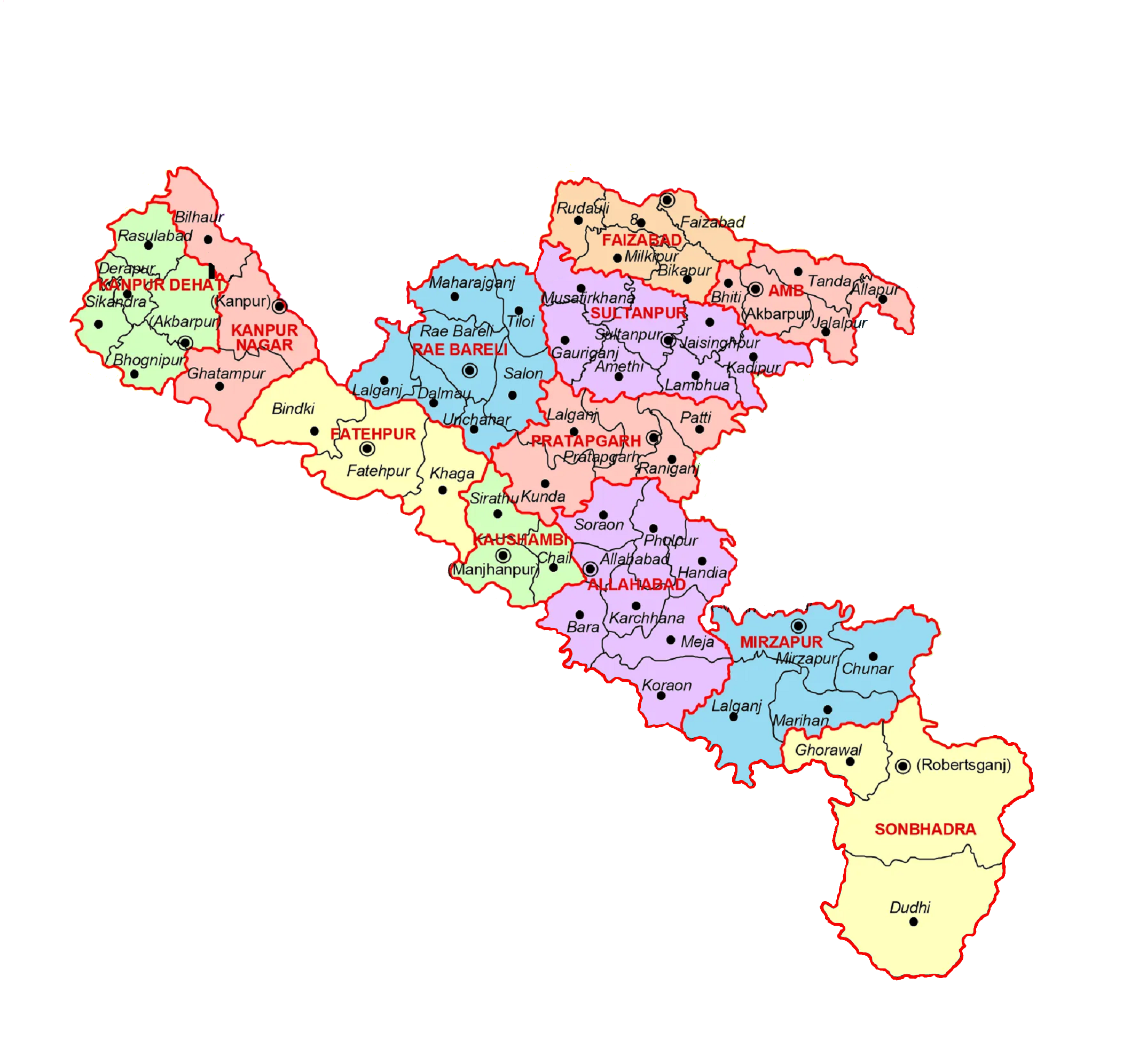
Map of the Diocese of Allahabad

== History ==
- 1845: Established as Apostolic Vicariate of Patna from the Apostolic Vicariate of Tibet-Hindustan
- 1 September 1886: Promoted as Diocese of Allahabad

== Leadership ==
Bishop Louis Mascarenhas (24 August 2023-till now)

  - Bishop Ignatius Menezes (1 February 2013 - 2 December 2013)
- Bishops of Allahabad (Latin Rite)
  - Bishop Mar Raphy Manjaly (3 December 2013 – 11 November 2020) - Syro Malabar Catholic Rite
  - Bishop Isidore Fernandes (5 May 1988 – 31 January 2013)
  - Bishop Baptist Mudartha (1 March 1976 – 5 May 1988)
  - Bishop Alfred Fernández (25 June 1970 – 15 December 1975)
  - Bishop Raymond D’Mello (21 April 1964 – 20 December 1969)
  - Bishop Leonard Joseph Raymond (later Archbishop) (10 April 1947 – 16 January 1964)
  - Bishop Joseph Angel Poli, OFMCap (later Archbishop) (18 December 1917 – 11 July 1946)
  - Bishop Pierre-François Gramigna, OFMCap (25 August 1904 – 18 December 1917)
  - Bishop Victor Gaetano Sinibaldi, OFMCap (27 September 1899 – 5 January 1902)
  - Bishop Charles Joseph Gentili, OFMCap (later Archbishop) (29 March 1897 – 27 August 1898)
  - Bishop Francis Pesci, OFMCap (1 September 1886 – 9 July 1896)

== Saints and causes for canonisation ==
- Ven. Anastasius Hartmann, Apostolic Vicar of Patna, which was later promoted as the diocese of Allahabad.
