= Baptist Mudartha =

Indian clergyman and bishop

- Bishop Emeritus of Allahabad
- Church: Catholic Church
- Diocese: Diocese of Allahabad
- In office: 1 March 1976 – 5 May 1988
- Predecessor: Alfred Fernández
- Successor: Isidore Fernandes
- Previous posts: Bishop of Jhansi (1967-1976); Titular Bishop of Idebessus (1963-1967); Auxiliary Bishop of Jhansi (1963-1967)

Orders
- Ordination: 21 December 1942
- Consecration: 20 October 1963 by Pope Paul VI

Personal details
- Born: 9 September 1911 Mangalore, Kingdom of Mysore, British Raj, British Empire
- Died: 30 May 2007 (aged 95) Allahabad, Uttar Pradesh, India

Baptist Mudartha (born 9 September 1911 in Mangalore – 30 May 2007) was an Indian clergyman and bishop for the Roman Catholic Diocese of Allahabad. He became ordained in 1942. He was appointed bishop in 1963. He died on 30 May 2007, at the age of 95.
