= Roman Catholic Diocese of Lucknow =

Roman Catholic diocese in Uttar Pradesh, India

Coordinates: 26.8502°N 80.9428°E

Diocese of Lucknow Dioecesis Lucknovensis लखनऊ के सूबा لکھنؤ کے صوبہ
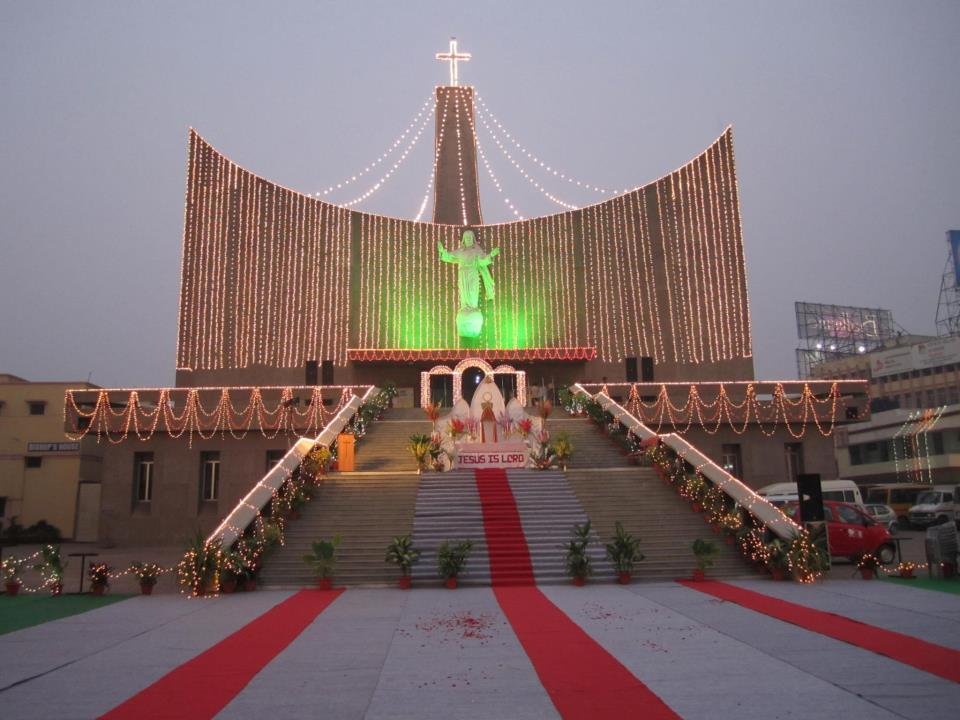

Location
- Country: India
- Ecclesiastical province: Agra
- Metropolitan: Agra

Statistics
- Area: 45,124 km^{2} (17,422 sq mi)
- Population: Total; Catholics: (as of 2004); 22,681,901; 7,305 (0.0%)

Information
- Rite: Latin Rite
- Cathedral: St Joseph's Cathedral in Lucknow
- Patron saint: Saint Joseph; Saint Francis of Assisi

Current leadership
- Pope: Leo XIV
- Bishop: Gerald John Mathias
- Metropolitan Archbishop: Albert D'Souza

Map
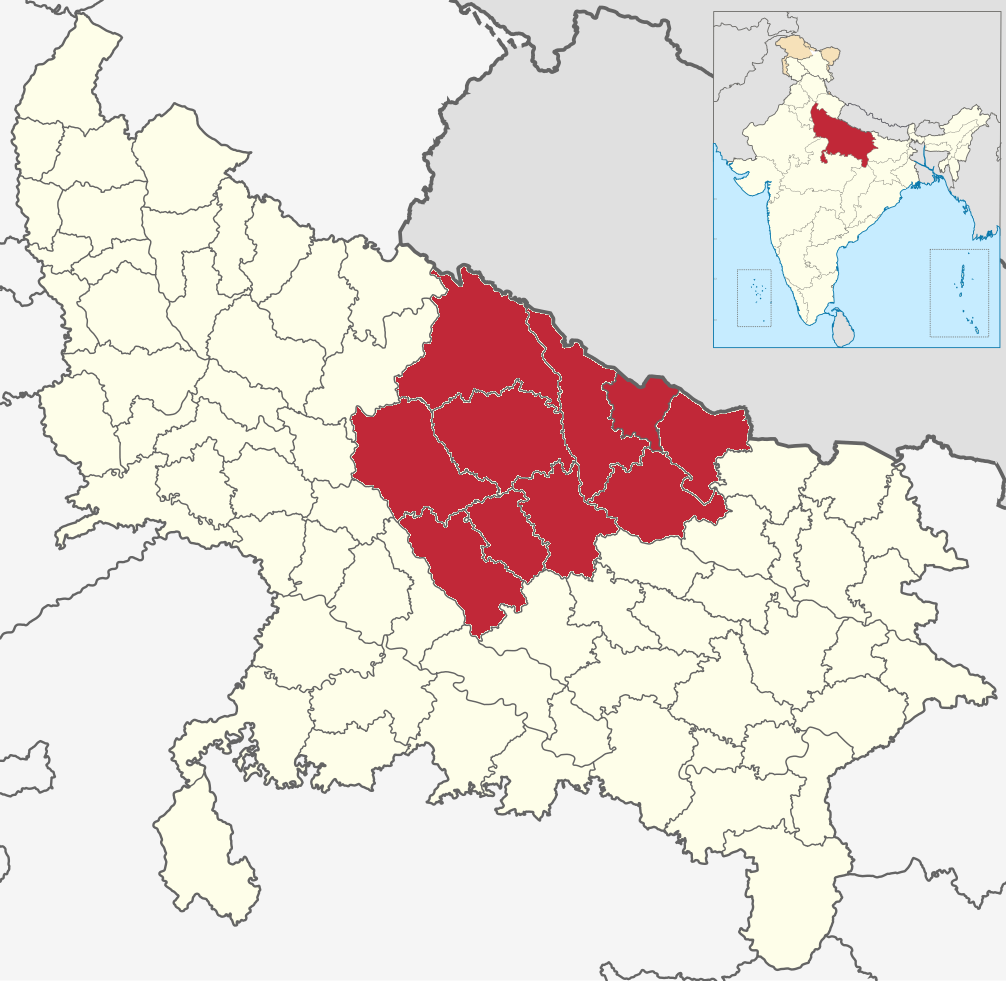

Website
- Website of the Diocese

The Roman Catholic Diocese of Lucknow (Latin: Lucknoven(sis)) is a diocese centred in the city of Lucknow in the ecclesiastical province of Agra in India. St. Joseph's Cathedral is located in the Hazratganj area of Lucknow, and the Cathedral School of Lucknow is located in the same compound.

== Leadership ==
- Bishops of Lucknow (Latin Rite)
  - Bishop Gerald John Mathias (8 November 2007 – present)
  - Bishop Albert D’Souza (later Archbishop) (21 November 1992 – 16 February 2007)
  - Bishop Alan Basil de Lastic (later Archbishop) (2 July 1984 – 19 November 1990)
  - Bishop Cecil DeSa (later Archbishop) (5 June 1971 – 11 November 1983)
  - Bishop Albert Conrad De Vito, OFMCap (first bishop, 12 December 1946 – 16 November 1970)
  - Bishop Joseph Angel Poli, OFMCap (later archbishop) (Apostolic administrator, 1940 – 1946)
