= Roman Catholic Archdiocese of Agra =

Latin Catholic jurisdiction in India

Coordinates: 27.3000°N 78.0333°E

Archdiocese of Agra Archidioecesis Agraënsis
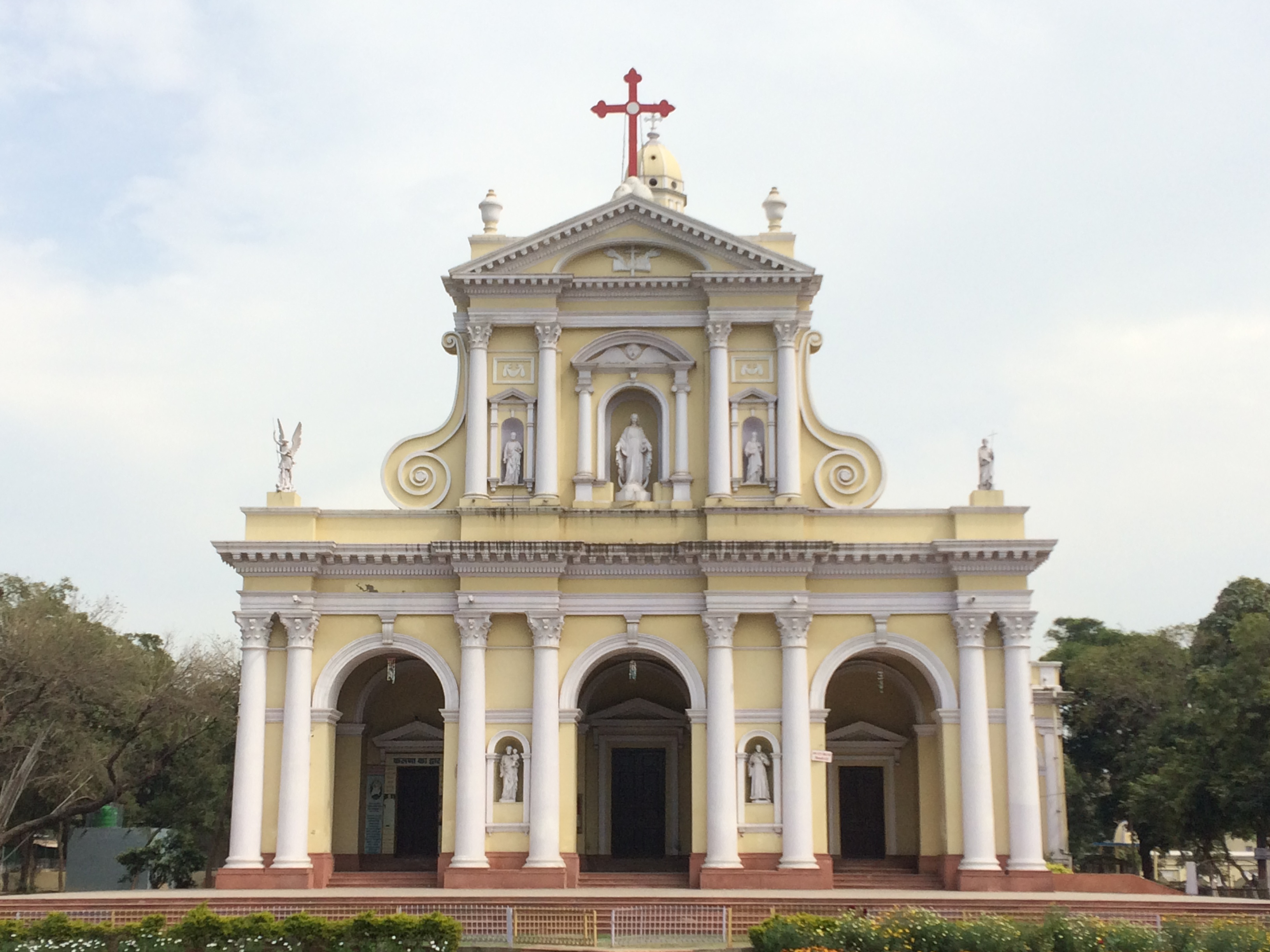

Location
- Country: India
- Ecclesiastical province: Agra

Statistics
- Area: 69,162 km^{2} (26,704 sq mi)
- Population: Total; Catholics: (as of 2015); 27,380,000; 17,182 (0.1%)
- Parishes: 43

Information
- Denomination: Catholic Church
- Sui iuris church: Latin Church
- Rite: Roman Rite
- Established: 1886; 140 years ago
- Cathedral: Cathedral of the Immaculate Conception in Agra
- Patron saint: Our Lady of the Immaculate Conception
- Secular priests: 105

Current leadership
- Pope: Leo XIV
- Metropolitan Archbishop: Raphy Manjaly
- Bishops emeritus: Albert D’Souza

Website
- Website of the Archdiocese

The Archdiocese of Agra (Latin: Agraën(sis)) is a Latin Church archdiocese of the Catholic Church in northern India's Uttar Pradesh state. It comprises the following districts in Uttar Pradesh: Agra, Aligarh, Auraiya, Budaun, Bulandshahr, Etah, Etawah, Farrukabad, Firozabad, Gautambudha Nagar, Hathras, Kannauj, Kasganj, Mainpuri, Mathura and in Rajasthan: Bharatpur and Dholpur.

Its cathedral episcopal see is located in the city of Agra.

== History ==
- Established in 1784 as Mission sui iuris of Hindustan, on territory split off from the Apostolic Vicariate of Great Mogul
- Promoted in 1820 as Apostolic Vicariate of Tibet-Hindustan, hence entitled to a titular bishop.
- Name changed in 1846 to Apostolic Vicariate of Agra
- 1 September 1886: Promoted as Metropolitan Archdiocese of Agra, yet remains dependent on the Roman Congregation for the Evangelization of Peoples.

== Ordinaries ==
(All Latin Rite, till 1982 missionary members of a Latin Congregation) Ecclesiastical Superiors of Hindustan (not available : 1784 - 1820)

Apostolic Vicars of Tibet-Hindustan

- Zenobio Benucci, OFMCap (29 Aug 1820 – death 24 Jun 1824), Titular Bishop of Thermæ (29 Aug 1820 – 24 Jun 1824)
- Antonio Pezzoni, OFMCap (27 Jan 1826 – retired 1841), Titular Bishop of Hesbon (27 Jan 1826 – death 13 Oct 1844)
- Pope Gregory XVI's breve sent to Joseph Angelo di Fazio, titular bishop of Tipasa in Mauretania, in 1837 refers to Fazio as coadjutor of the Apostolic Vicar of Hindustan.

Apostolic Vicars of Agra

- Giuseppe Antonio Borghi, OFMCap (1842 – 12 Jun 1849), succeeding as former Coadjutor Vicar Apostolic of Tibet-Hindustan (14 Aug 1838 – 1842), remaining Titular Bishop of Bethsaida (14 Aug 1838 – 5 Nov 1849); later Bishop of Cortona (Italy) (5 Nov 1849 – death 31 Jul 1851)
- Gaetano Carli, OFMCap (12 Jun 1849 – retired 7 Dec 1856?), succeeding as former Coadjutor Vicar Apostolic of Agra (23 Aug 1842 – 12 Jun 1849), remaining Titular Bishop of Halmiros (23 Aug 1842 – 1887)
- Angelicus Bedenik, OFMCap (1 Jun 1861 – death 2 Nov 1866), Titular Bishop of Leuca (1 Jun 1861 – 2 Nov 1866)
- Michelangelo Jacobi, OFMCap (9 Feb 1868 – 1 Sep 1886 see below), Titular Bishop of Pentacomia (9 Feb 1868 – 1 Sep 1886)

Metropolitan Archbishops of Agra

- Michelangelo Jacobi, OFMCap (see above 1 Sep 1886 – death 14 Oct 1891)
- Emmanuel Alfonso van den Bosch, OFMCap (2 January 1892 – 27 April 1897), previously Bishop of Lahore (Pakistan, then also British India) (21 Nov 1890 – 2 Jan 1892); emeritate as Titular Archbishop of Parium (27 Apr 1897 – 17 Oct 1921)
- Charles Joseph Gentili, OFMCap (27 August 1898 – death 6 January 1917), previously Bishop of Allahabad (India) (29 Mar 1897 – 27 Aug 1898)
- Angelo Raffaele Bernacchioni, OFMCap (7 August 1917 – death 21 August 1937)
- Evangelista Latino Enrico Vanni, OFMCap (21 August 1937 – 1956), succeeding as former Coadjutor Archbishop of Agra (India) (1930 – 21 Aug 1937); previously Apostolic Vicar of Arabia (United Arab Emirates) (15 Apr 1916 – 1925) & Titular Archbishop of Tenedus (15 Apr 1916 – 21 Aug 1937); emeritate as Titular Archbishop of Bizya (1956 – 9 May 1962)
- Dominic Romuald Basil Athaide, OFMCap (29 February 1956 – death 26 June 1982)
- Cecil DeSa (11 November 1983 – retired 16 April 1998), previously Bishop of Lucknow (India) (5 Jun 1971 – 11 Nov 1983)
- Vincent Michael Concessao (5 November 1998 – 7 September 2000), previously Titular Bishop of Mascula (3 Feb 1995 – 5 Nov 1998) & Auxiliary Bishop of Delhi (India) (3 Feb 1995 – 5 Nov 1998); later Vice-President of Catholic Bishops’ Conference of India (2000 – 2004), Metropolitan Archbishop of Delhi (7 Sep 2000 – 30 Nov 2012), Vice-President of Conference of Catholic Bishops of India (2007 – 2011)
- Oswald Gracias (7 September 2000 – 14 October 2006), also Second Vice-President of "Vox Clara" Committee (2002.04 – ...), President of Conference of Catholic Bishops of India (2005 – 12 Jan 2011); previously Titular Bishop of Bladia (28 Jun 1997 – 7 Sep 2000) & Auxiliary Bishop of Bombay (India) (28 Jun 1997 – 7 Sep 2000); later Metropolitan Archbishop of Bombay (India) (14 Oct 2006 – ...), created Cardinal-Priest of S. Paolo della Croce a Corviale (24 Nov 2007 [10 May 2008] – ...), Vice-President of Catholic Bishops’ Conference of India (19 Feb 2008 – 1 Mar 2010), President of Catholic Bishops’ Conference of India (1 Mar 2010 – 12 Feb 2014), President of Federation of Asian Bishops’ Conferences (21 Oct 2011 [1 Jan 2012] – ...), President of Conference of Catholic Bishops of India (2013.02 – ...), Member of Council of Cardinals to assist in the governance of the Universal Church and to reform the Roman Curia (13 Apr 2013 – ...)
- Albert D’Souza (16 Feb 2007 – 12 Nov 2020), also Secretary General of Catholic Bishops’ Conference of India (2012.02 – ...); previously Bishop of Lucknow (India) (21 Nov 1992 – 16 Feb 2007)
- Raphy Manjaly (12 Nov 2020–present) previously Bishop of Allahabad (India) (17 Oct 2013 – 12 Nov 2020)

== Province ==
Its ecclesiastical province comprises the Metropolitan's own Archdiocese and the following Suffragan bishoprics:

- Roman Catholic Diocese of Ajmer
- Roman Catholic Diocese of Allahabad
- Roman Catholic Diocese of Bareilly
- Roman Catholic Diocese of Jaipur
- Roman Catholic Diocese of Jhansi
- Roman Catholic Diocese of Lucknow
- Roman Catholic Diocese of Meerut
- Roman Catholic Diocese of Udaipur
- Roman Catholic Diocese of Varanasi

== Parishes ==
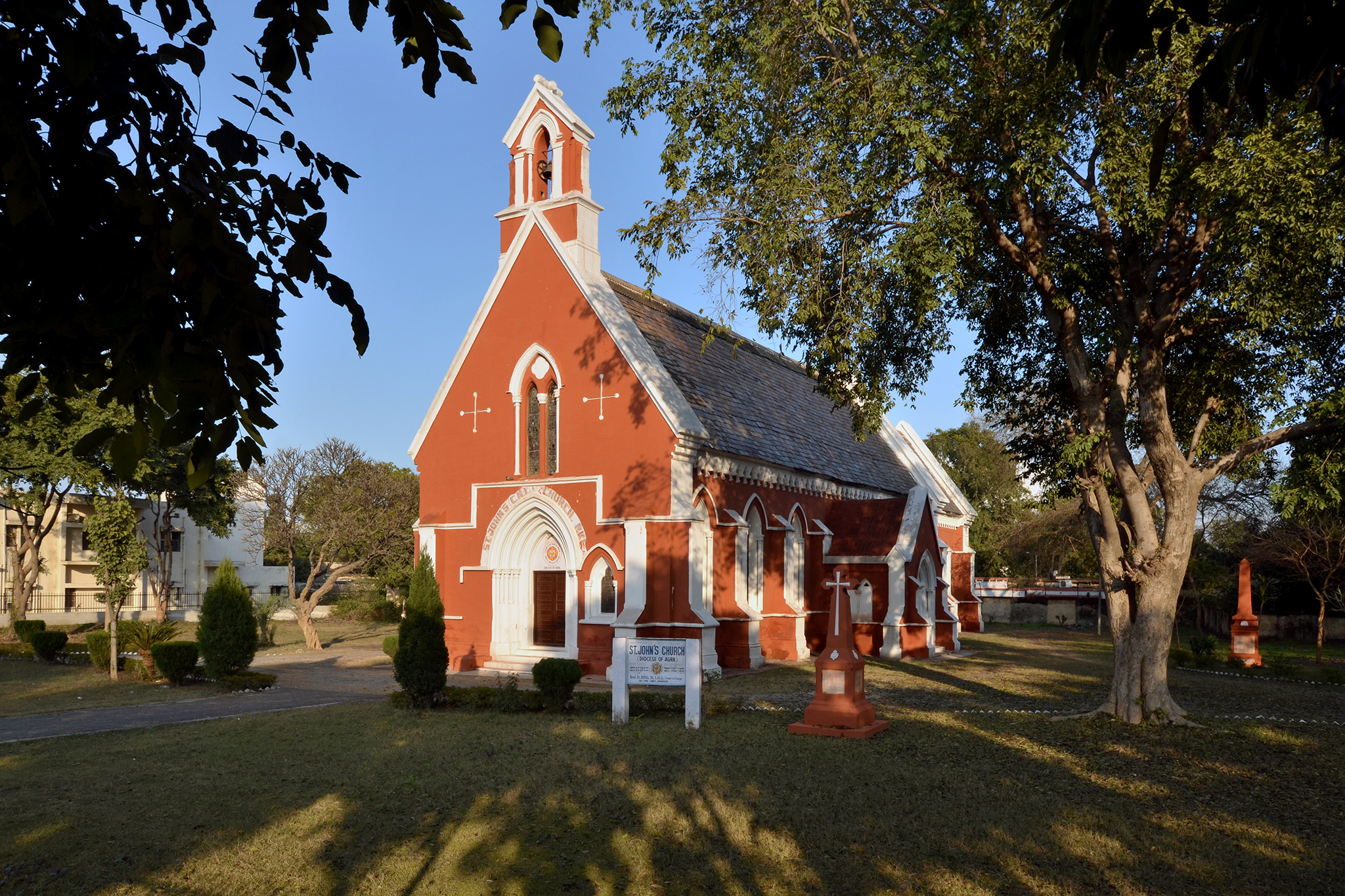
St. John's Church Roorkee.

- Cathedral of Immaculate Conception
- St. Mary’s Church, Agra
- St. Patrick’s Church, Agra
- St. Thomas Church, Agra, Sikandra
- Our Lady of Fatima Mission, Ajaynagar
- Holy Family Mission, Alampur Hauz
- St. Fidelis’ Church, Aligarh
- St. Michael’s Mission, Anupnagar
- St. Francis Mission, Auraiya
- Our Lady of Rosary Mission, Bastar
- St. Peter’s Church, Bharatpur
- St. Peter’s Mission, Bhimnagar
- Catholic Church, Budaun
- St. Gonsalo Garcia Church, Bulandshahr
- St. Paul’s Catholic Church, Chhibramau
- Our Lady of Pilar Church, Dholpur
- St. Joseph’s Mission, NTPC, Dibyapur
- St. Francis Xavier Church, Etah
- Christ Church, Etawah
- St. Anthony’s Church, Fatehgarh
- St. John’s Church, Firozabad
- St. Joseph’s Church, Greater Noida
- St. Francis’ Church, Hathras
- St. Joseph’s Church, Jahangirabad
- Nishkalanka Mata Mission, Jaith
- St. Peter's Mission, Jaswant Nagar
- St. Mathew's Mission, Kannauj
- St. Joseph’s Church, Kasganj
- St. Anthony’s Church, Khora
- St. Theresa’s Church, Kosi Kalan
- St. Thomas’ Mission, Mainpuri
- Sacred Heart Church, Mathura
- St. Mary's Church, Noida
- St. Dominic's Mission, Shikohabad
- Holy Family Church, Tundla

== See also ==
- Catholic Church in India
- Catholic Church in Tibet
- Diocese of Agra (Church of North India)
- Diocese of Kangding

== Sources and external links ==
- GCatholic.org, with incumbent biography links
- Catholic Hierarchy
- Official website
