= Raphy Manjaly =

Indian Catholic prelate (born 1958)

The Right Reverend Mar Raphy Manjaly
- Archbishop of Agra
- Church: Catholic Church; Latin Church
- Archdiocese: Agra
- Province: Agra
- Appointed: 12 November 2020
- Installed: 7 January 2021
- Predecessor: Albert D'Souza
- Previous posts: Bishop of Varanasi (2007‍–‍2013); Bishop of Allahabad (2013‍–‍2020)

Personal details
- Born: Raphy Manjaly; 7 February 1958 (age 68) Vendore, Kerala, India
- Education: Agra University; Pontifical Urban University; Pontifical University of Saint Thomas Aquinas
- Motto: To Bring Together People of God

Ordination history
History
Episcopal consecration
- Principal consecrator: Pedro López Quintana
- Co-consecrators: Oswald Gracias, Patrick Paul D'Souza

Styles of Raphy Manjaly
- Reference style: The Most Reverend Mar
- Spoken style: Your Grace
- Religious style: Archbishop

Bishop Raphy Manjaly is an Indian Catholic prelate serving as the Archbishop of the Archdiocese of Agra, in India. He was installed as the archbishop of Agra on 7 January 2021.

== Early life and education ==
Manjaly was born on 7 February 1958 in Kerala, India, to Kathreena and M.V. Chacko. He received his primary education at St. Francis Xavier School, Vendore, Kerala and completed his high school from Tyagarajar High School, Alagappanagar, Trichur, Kerala. He joined St. Lawrence Minor Seminary, Agra, in 1973 and completed it in year 1975. He joined St. Joseph's Regional Seminary, Allahabad, in 1975 and completed his philosophy and theology education in year 1983. He completed his graduation and post graduation from Agra University. He completed his doctorate in spirituality from Angelicum University, Rome.

== Priesthood ==
Manjaly was ordained a Syro-Malabar Catholic priest on 11 May 1983 at St. Mary's Church, a Syro-Malabar Catholic church in the Archeparchy of Trichur in Vendore, Kerala.

== Episcopate ==
Manjaly was appointed bishop of Varanasi on 24 February 2007 and consecrated on 30 April 2007. He was appointed bishop of Allahabad on 17 October 2013 and installed on 3 December 2013. He was appointed Archbishop of Agra on 12 November 2020 and installed on 7 January 2021.
