= Eugene Joseph =

Roman Catholic bishop

Most Reverend Eugene Joseph
- Bishop of Varanasi
- Archdiocese: Agra
- Diocese: Varanasi
- Appointed: 30 May 2015
- Predecessor: Raphy Manjaly
- Successor: Incumbent

Orders
- Ordination: 10 April 1985
- Consecration: 24 August 2015 by Salvatore Pennacchio

Personal details
- Born: 31 July 1958 (age 68) Rajakkamangalam Thurai, Tamil Nadu, India
- Denomination: Roman Catholic
- Parents: Mr. Siluvadimai Fernando; Mrs. Antoniammal Rodriquez
- Education: Dowling College
- Motto: EVANGELIZATION THROUGH DIVERSITY

Bishop Eugene Joseph is the current serving bishop of the Roman Catholic Diocese of Varanasi, India.

== Early life and education ==
He was born in Rajakkamangalam, Tamil Nadu, India, on 31 July 1958 to Mr. Siluvadimai Fernando and Mrs. Antoniammal Rodriquez. He acquired his secondary school education from Carmel High School, Nagercoil. He completed his minor seminary studies from St. Theresa's Minor Seminary, Ajmer and completed philosophy and theology from St. Charles Seminary, Nagpur. He has a Bachelor of Arts degree from Nagpur University, Maharashtra and a Bachelor of Education degree from Gorakhpur University, U.P. He has also acquired a master's degree in English and a master's in business administration from Townsend School of Business, New York, US.

== Priesthood ==
On 10 April 1985 he was ordained a priest for the Roman Catholic Diocese of Varanasi. After ordination he served as an assistant parish priest, teacher and warden at St. Thomas Inter-College, Shahganj. He served as an assistant rector of the Minor Seminary, parish priest of Our Lady of Lourdes Parish, Ghazipur, director of Nav Sadhana Regional Pastoral Centre and Kala Kendra, director of St. Mary's Hospital and founding director of St. Mary's School of Nursing, Varanasi.

He was appointed apostolic administrator of the Varanasi Diocese in December 2013.

== Episcopate ==
He was appointed Bishop of Varanasi on 30 May 2015 by Pope Francis and ordained on 24 August 2015 by Salvatore Pennacchio.
