= Parathavarma Pandian =

Indian freedom fighter

Senhor Don Gabriel de Cruz Vaz

Ruler of Pearl Fishery Coast
- Reign: 1779 - 1808
- Predecessor: Senhor Caspar Vaz Victoria
- Born: December 3, 1753; Tuticorin
- Died: 1808 (aged 54–55); Manapad, Tamil nadu
- Burial: La Salle School, Tuticorin
- Father: Caspar Vaz Victoria
- Mother: Aida Gomez P Rayan
- Occupation: Ruler

Senhor Don Gabriel de Cruz Vaz (also known with the title Parathavarma Pandian) (December 13, 1753 – 1808) was the ruler and freedom fighter from the Pearl Fishery Coast, in what is now southern India, who helped Maruthu Pandiyar and other freedom fighters like Veerapandiya Kattabomman and Oomaithurai. He fought against the Dutch and later the British.

== Early life ==
Senhor Don Gabriel de Cruz was born on December 13, 1753, in a Catholic Paravar family, and became the 16th ruler of the Pearl Fishery Coast, following the death of Don Caspar Anthony De Cruz Vaz Victoria in 1779. Senhor was the honorary title given by the Portuguese to these Catholic rulers. And Parathavarma Pandian or Pandiyapathy are the local titles given to them. In 1772, on his wedding, a golden chalice was offered to Our Lady of Snow's Church. The golden chalice is taken out every year on 5, August for the feast mass celebrated by the Bishop.

== Involvement with British ==
Initially, Pandian allied with the British to defeat the Dutch who controlled the beach road in the 1780s. However, he later joined forces with Veerapandiya Kattabomman to fight against British rule. Pandian sheltered and protected Kattabomman's brother Oomaithurai after his escape from prison and supplied explosives from Ceylon to support the retaliation against the British. Despite orders from the British to capture him, Pandian managed to evade authorities until his death at the age of 56 in 1808.

== Legacy ==
He was also known for his involvement in the traditional practice of pulling the rope of the Tiruchendur Murugan temple car and offering a golden chariot for the Our Lady of Snows Church in Thoothukudi. He is remembered as Thermaran(தேர்மாறன்). His tomb is still preserved at the La Salle Higher Secondary School campus in Thoothukudi. The Central Government of India officially announced him as a freedom fighter.
