= R. Sriram =

Indian kabaddi player

R. Sriram Is an Indian professional kabaddi player. He is the raider in the Puneri Paltan Kabadi team, he has played for UM(U Mumba) and DD (Delhi Dabang) team.

== Personal life ==
R Sriram was born on 17 September 1998, Currently, he is a junior clerk with customs and Excise department. At his young age, he was playing Kabaddi in the Alathankari Kabaddi club in Rajakkamangalam taluk of Kanyakumari district. His father is a retired employee of Railways.

== Kabaddi career ==
His first kabaddi career started with vivo pro kabaddi when he was 28 years old, and then went on to play with U Mumba, Delhi Dabang and currently he is playing with Puneri paltan Kabadi team.

The total number of matches played is 15, total raids were 89 and raid points were 39. His average strike rate is 52.89% and averages out rate are 52.04.
