= Keelavaippar =

Village in Tamil Nadu, India

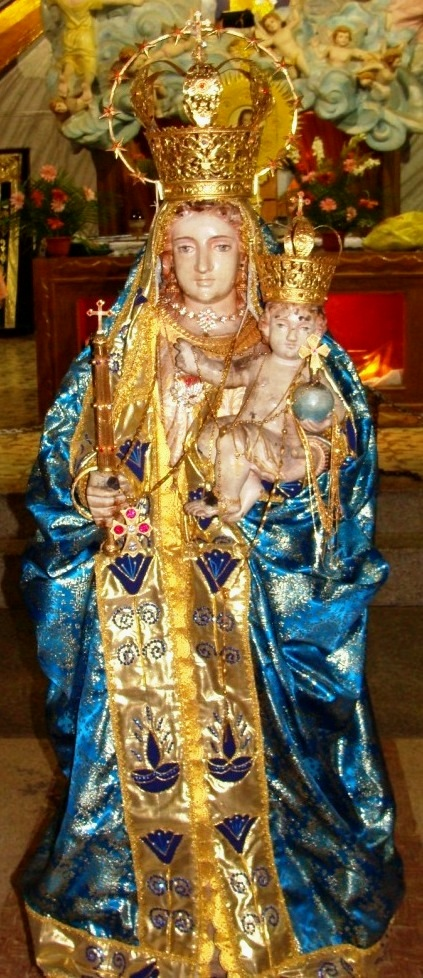
Lady of Assumption

Keelavaippar (also known as Keela Vaippar or Kilavaippar) is a small village on the coast of south India, in the Vilathikulam Taluk area of Tuticorin District, Tamil Nadu. It is inhabited predominantly by Paravars.

Fishing is the primary occupation, as it has been throughout Paravar history.

The village hosts St Louis Primary School and the St Louis High School.

== Religion ==
On the eastern bank of the Vaippar river is the church of Our Lady of Assumption, one of the first churches built by the Portuguese in the sub-continent. The Jesuit record shows that a church dedicated to Our Lady of Assumption existed as early as 1571. The feast of Our Lady of Assumption is celebrated annually on 15 August, being preceded by a flag hoisting ceremony on 6 August and with novena prayers on all subsequent days until the feast itself.

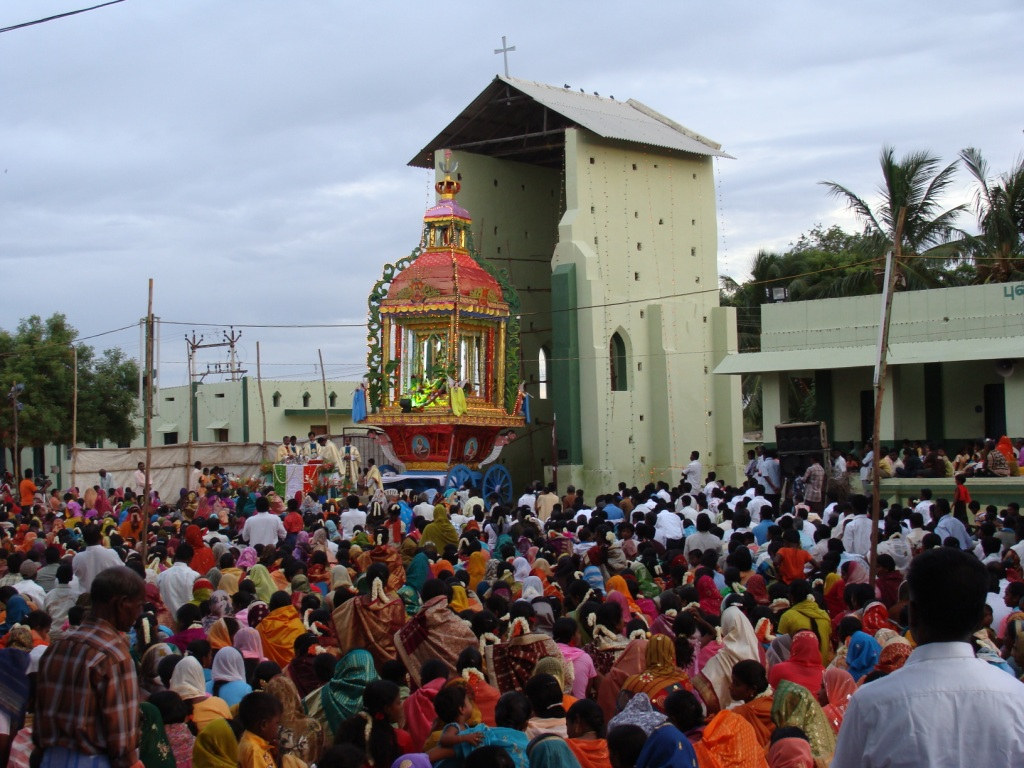
Grand mass on the day of the festival of Lady of the Assumption on 15 August

Keelavaippar is one of the ancient five Padroado parishes of the Pearl Fishery Coast. After Tuticorin was made a diocese, it continued to be a part of the Mylapore Padroado diocese. In accordance with an agreement between the Vatican and the Portuguese government, the parish was joined with Tuticorin diocese on 4 April 1930.

This parish was made into seven Basic Christian Communities on 11 December 1994. In 1995 a parish council was constituted with the representatives of the Basic Christian Communities. St. Antony's grotto in the beach was enlarged in 1995 and a grotto of the Child Jesus was constructed inside the campus in 1996.
