= Paravar =

Maritime community in South India

Paravar/Bharathavar
- பரவர்
- Religions: Christianity (Predominantly Catholicism)
- Languages: Tamil
- Country: India, Sri Lanka
- Populated states: Tamil Nadu
- Region: South India
- Related groups: Bharathas

Paravar (also known as Bharathar) is a predominantly Catholic Tamil maritime community, mainly living in the state of Tamil Nadu, and in Sri Lanka. Historically, they were inhabitants of the Neithal (coastal) lands of Tamil Nadu, and find mention in various ancient Tamil literary works.

In modern India, Paravars are concentrated along the coastal belt extending along the Gulf of Mannar, from Kilakarai to Kanyakumari (Cape Comorin). They also live in some pockets along the Arabian Sea coast in Kanyakumari District as well as central Kerala. Paravars have been significant among the population of the port city of Thoothukudi and Ramanathapuram, since the 1580s. Apart from Thoothukudi and Ramanathapuram, Paravars also live in many of the big cities and towns in South Tamilnadu like Tuticorin, Nagercoil, Tirunelveli, Rameshwaram, Thiruchendur and Madurai where they are into diverse professions.

In Sri Lanka, the Paravas (called Bharathas in Sri Lanka) have been a more affluent, merchant community since the British colonial times. Today, they are found in significant numbers in the cities of Negombo and Colombo. A section of the Bharathakula community in Sri Lanka has been classified as a separate ethnic group since 2001, whereas another section which identifies itself as Sri Lankan Tamil live in towns such as Vankalai in Mannar District and Puttalam.

The Paravars have a rich history, starting from their major economic contributions to the coffers of the ancient Pandya kings through their pearl-harvesting and trade, to their later interactions with the Portuguese in the 16th century and later. The arrival of Portuguese soldiers and missionaries in their midst, including the great missionary St. Francis Xavier, resulted in their conversion to the Catholic faith, adoption of Portuguese surnames and also protection against marauding enemies.

== Etymology ==
The name Paravar literally means "dwellers on seacoast" and is derived from the Old Tamil word paravai meaning "sea" or "expanse". The Paravars may have been the Paradavar mentioned in Sangam literature, who are mentioned in the Pattinappaalai. They were maritime inhabitants of the littoral Sangam landscape known as Neithal, who were involved in pearls-harvesting, boat-building, salt-making, fishing, among other maritime activities. Professor Subramaniam says, they were “ferocious warriors” and constituted the most part of Tamil Navy at all times The name Parathavar may have been derived from the Tamil root word paravai.

The Paravars prefer to call themselves Parathar, also written Bharathar, which may be a corrupted form of the Tamil word padavar meaning "boat men". Another theory proposes that the community originated from ancient Ayodhya and are descendants of the Bharatas clan from the Hindu epic Mahabharata, who were the ancestors of the heroes in the epic.

== History ==
=== Pandyan dynasty ===
The Pandya kings, eventually, moved their capital to Madurai. Pandyas were rulers with fish on their flag. There is also a theory that the etymology of the name Meenakshi, for whom the great Meenakshi Temple, Madurai was built, is derived from the Tamil words meen (fish) and aatchi (rule). Thus, some researchers point to the fact that the Pandyans may have been from the Neithal lands of ancient Tamil country, which were then mostly occupied by the Bharathars. Also, in the ancient Tamil epic Cilappatikaram, the Pandyan king is referred to as Korkai Pandyan by Kannagi, which gives credence to the theory that the Pandyas were originally from Korkai, where the Bharathars lived. The Cilappatikaram praises Bharathavars as one who sails high seas, killed whales, one who did pearl and valampuri shell diving, one who runs world’s famous kingdom and city, and kings.

Pearls were major exports from the Pandya Kingdom by the first century AD, and was a major source of revenue for the kingdom. (The pearl diving season usually lasted 20 – 30 days, around March). The Paravas were skilled in diving and in the harvesting of pearls, which were done scientifically. Thus, the control of the Paravas and the Pearls trade led to many skirmishes in the region, right from the ancient Pandyas to the friction between the Muslims, the Portuguese and the Dutch, in later centuries.

The Pandyan kings allowed the Paravars to manage and operate the pearl fisheries because of their already ancient skills in that activity, which required specialist seamanship abilities, knowledge of how to tend the oysterbeds and also knowledge of their location. The Pandyan kings exempted the Paravars from taxation and allowed them to govern themselves in return for being paid tribute from the produce extracted.

Cave engravings from the third century BC, found in 2003, reinforce this view as they suggest that the Paravars were the chieftains (Velirs) of the coastal region during this period, ruling as subordinates of the Pandyas. Previously, in the 1920s, Iyengar had noted that the caste name was used in ancient scripts to mean both boatmen and chiefs of the Madurai country. A report written in 1669 made it clear that in so far as they were kings, they were only kings of their own people and not of any wider constituency; furthermore, that these "kings" were referred to as such only by the Paravars. However, in the Sangam work Mathuraikkanci, the author Mankudi Maruthanar, refers to his patron, the Pandya sovereign Talaiyanganam Nedunjeliyan, as the Lord of Korkai and the Warlord of the southern Parathavar (Then Parathavar por yere).

The community was also involved in sea salt production, which was a relatively easy task on the Indian coast as the hot temperatures evaporated the water without the need for firewood.

The 1901 Madras Census noted that the Tamil-speaking Paravars "claim" to be kshatriyas (warriors) serving under the Pandyan kings, the word used suggesting some official doubt regarding the issue.

Little is known about the Paravas during the Middle Ages. Indeed, Donkin has argued that with one exception, "there are no native literary works with a developed sense of chronology, or indeed much sense of place, before the thirteenth century", and that any historical observations have to be made using Arab, European and Chinese accounts. Southern India came under the control of the Cholas in the ninth century but reverted to Pandyan control around the mid-1200s following a series of battles. They maintained control, despite several challenges, until the 16th century.

=== Arab arrival ===
Regardless of any doubt regarding their claims to be warriors under the liege of Pandyan kings, the Paravars certainly did have armies at a later time, these being created to protect the fisheries and their people from attack.

The Arab Muslim invasion began in 712 AD at the Sindh Valley and by around 1300 AD they had taken over the entire northern India. However, even prior to the invasion there were Arabs in southern areas such as Calicut, Quilon and Malabar, chiefly traders interested in the spices, pearls, precious stones and cottons which were available there. Another advantage of the location was that it was on a major sea trade route running through south-east Asia and on to China. Some of these Arabs were also pearl divers, having gained their experience in the waters of the Persian Gulf. Some Paravars adopted Islam, whose women also were married off to Muslim traders. These claimed to be descendants of the biblical figure Noah. The descendants of these Muslim people became known as the Lebbais and their main settlement was the town of Kayal, a presence which was noted by Vasco da Gama and Duarte Barbosa by the early sixteenth century.

There is some ambiguity regarding this town: there was a harbour on the Tamraparani River in Pandyan times which was known as Korkai and when the river at this point became too silted to use (it is situated approximately 8 km inland nowadays), it was replaced by a port called Kayal, thought to be situated variously either at the mouth of the river or at the village of Palayakayal which was 4 km downstream of Korkai but is itself nowadays about 3 km inland. Marco Polo described Kayal as a bustling port and the centre of the pearl trade in 1292 but by the mid-16th century this too had probably ceased to operate and was replaced by another port, Punnaikayal (new Kayal) under the influence of the Portuguese colonists. Punnaikayal was again at the mouth of the river, which as part of an estuary was under constant change, around 4 km from Palayakayal. It is difficult to determine with any consistency which of these locations is being referred to at various times by various authors but what does appear to be a common factor is that this was until modern times a major port for the pearl trade. Kayal is the Tamil and Malayalam word for a backwater.

The 1901 Madras Census noted three groups who called themselves Paravars. It speculated that their common root were the mostly Christian Tamil-speaking Paravars, The other groups were the Canarese-speaking Paravars, who were umbrella makers and devil-dancers and the Malayalam-speaking Paravars, who were lime burners, gymnasts, midwives and shell collectors. It has been further speculated that the splitting of the latter two groups from the first may have been as a consequence of a desire to move away from the ancient tribal area when faced with the arrival of Muslims.

The Paravar belief of being the Paravaims of the biblical scriptures and the lost tribes of Israel added to the differences with the Arabs, which is acknowledged by Fr.Henrique Henriques by his claim of kinship.

=== Arrival of the Portuguese and Catholicism ===
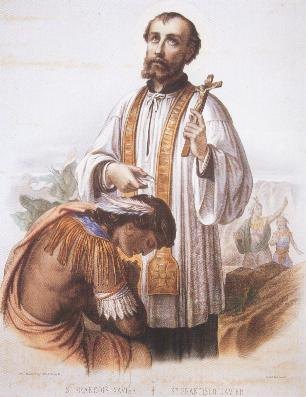
Conversion of the Paravas by St Francis Xavier, in a 19th-century coloured lithograph

There are differences of opinion regarding events up to the early 1500s. Donkin and Ray believe that the Muslims gained influence over the Paravars to the point that the latter became at best hired labour and at worst enslaved, and Neill has claimed that there was a belief among Paravars that the Muslims sought completely to exterminate them following various squabbles. However, Mannar and Chandrasekaran have said that up to the 16th century the Paravars had held almost a monopoly of the rights to exploit the pearl fisheries, having negotiated with successive kings to achieve this.

By this time, Maynard has claimed, the south Indian coastal areas around Kanyakumari were "the greatest pearl fishery in the world", and that the Hindu people who fished for oysters there " ... were known as the Paravas". He says that the Hindus were essentially peaceful in nature and temperamentally unsuited to counter physical threat, although Frykenberg has described them as a "... proud and venturesome seafaring folk engaged in fishing, pearl diving, trading, and piracy." Hastings has pointed out that the piracy (and some smuggling) was only an occasional activity and that their more normal occupations demanded courage, strength and stamina, which made them "hardened adventurers".

From 1527 the Paravars were being threatened by Arab fleets offshore, headed by the Muslim supporting Zamorin of Calicut, and also by an onshore campaign of the Rajah of Madura to wrest control of Tirunelveli and the Fishery Coast from the hands of the Rajah of Travancore. This continuing situation, and the desire to be relieved of the rivalry from Lebbai divers, caused the Paravars to seek the protection of Portuguese explorers who had moved into the area. A delegation led by Vikirama Aditha Pandya visited Goa to seek talks to this end in 1532. (Note: There are discrepancies regarding the identity of Vikirama Aditha Pandya. Bayly believes him "apparently" to have been a headman or senior caste elder (p. 326), as does Kaufmann (p. 208); however, Neill is very specific in saying that he was "a Cheti of the merchant caste resident in Calicut, who in 1513 had been sent to Portugal as an emissary of the zamorin, and while there had been baptised and taken a Portuguese name [João da Cruz]." Neill is also of the opinion that the agreement with the Portuguese arose in 1535 rather than 1532. (p. 142) Hastings broadly agrees with Neill regarding the identity (p. 167).) The protection was granted on the condition that the leaders were immediately baptised as Catholics and that they would encourage their people also to convert to Catholicism; the Portuguese would also gain a strategic foothold and control of the pearl fisheries. The deal was agreed to and Vikrama Aditya Pandya baptised as Joao de Cruz became the first subject of the king of Portugal and some months later 20,000 Paravars were baptised en masse, and became subjects of Portugal, during the visit of Pedro Gonsalves, Vicar of Cochin. By the end of 1537 the entire community had declared itself to be Catholics, according to Hastings, and the Portuguese proceeded to destroy the Arab fleet when they met fortuitously at Vedalai on 27 June 1538. The Portuguese state began to claim rights over the economic resources in the area due to its patronage of the Paravars. From that point the Paravar people as a whole enjoyed renewed prosperity. Their declaration of acceptance of the Catholic faith did not prevent them from continuing to worship in the manner which they had done previously because there were no translators to spread the Catholic message and also because the conversion was seen by the Paravar people as being merely a convenient arrangement to obtain protection, not a statement of belief. Bayly describes the situation as being "... really a declaration of tactical alliance rather than religious conversions as the term is usually understood."

St Francis Xavier, then a Jesuit priest, had been working in Goa prior to his journey to Kanyakumari, where he arrived in October 1542. He took with him some interpreters with the intention of spreading the Gospel and bringing about further religious conversions. Maynard claims that a further 10,000 Paravars were baptised during the first month of his mission, and 30,000 in total by its end; and that "His conversion of the Paravas, as is pointed out by Père Lhande, is the only instance of an entire caste being brought into the Church." More modest figures have been proposed, such as 15,000 people including re-baptisms. Xavier also brought about the conversion of members of other castes living in the area, for example Mukkuvars and Paraiyars. His methods of conversion were sometimes forceful; for example, it is recorded that he burned down a hut which had been used to house non-Christian religious symbols.

Xavier appointed catechists in the Paravar villages up and down the 100 miles (160 km) of coastline to spread and reinforce his teachings, the method for much of which was to recite repetitively (and in poorly translated Tamil) rhythmic phrases of the Creed, Pater Noster and other standard Catholic teachings regardless of whether the content was actually understood. These appointments necessitated that he obtained funds with which to pay them, the primary source being money granted to him by the Queen of Portugal.

Violence had not been completely removed from Paravar society, despite the Portuguese intervention. There were a series of bloody skirmishes involving the Badage tribe, raiding from the neighbouring area of Madura in the ongoing struggle between the rajahs. Some of the Portuguese protectors themselves were involved in duplicitous dealings with such tribes, or simply took advantage of the mayhem to make personal gains. Xavier intervened on several occasions in an attempt to right these wrongs and in March 1544 wrote a letter stating that the behaviour of the Portuguese was in fact the biggest hurdle he faced in promoting the Catholic message. In 1545 he wrote that "I have never ceased wondering at the number of new inflexions they have added to the conjugation of the verb to rob." He left India some time in the late 1540s or early 1550s but the precise year is disputed. There is at least one source which believes that Francis Xavier briefly visited again in 1548, when he was paraded through Tuticorin by the Paravars. It has been suggested that his status among the Paravars was one of "cult worship". There is a shrine to him, in a cave, which is still venerated today as the place they believe to have been his principal residence during his time among them.

Vikirama Aditha Pandya was rewarded by the Portuguese for his actions of 1532, when as part of the arrangement for protection he had offered to manage the pearl diving on behalf of the Portuguese. He became known as Senhor dos Senhores ("first among notables") Dom João da Cruz (but see Note 1) and was recognised as headman and official intermediary by the Portuguese from 1543 until 1553. (1543 was the year that the Portuguese first settled in Tuticorin, and the point from which that port began to expand until it eventually became the hub of the pearl fishery). His title of jati thalavan (head of the caste) was passed down through 21 other members of his family. Caste elders in the various villages were also among the early beneficiaries of Portuguese recognition, perhaps because they were the first to be converted. The consequence was that a formal system of hierarchical control, based on religious authority and economic standing and extending from the jati thalavan through to the elders and then to the villagers, became established in the eyes of Paravars and non-Paravars alike. It remained in existence until the 1920s, with the elders extracting payments from villagers which were then passed on to the jati thalavan, and the latter in return managing affairs (including the fishery operations) and adjudicating in both internal and external disputes involving the community. Kaufmann has commented that these "highly organised caste institutions" including hereditary headmen and councils of elders holding sway, was a rare thing in the agrarian economy of southern India and both lasted longer and was more elaborate than most equivalent Hindu systems of the area. Another writer has said that " ... by the beginning of the eighteenth century the Tamil Paravas had emerged as one of south India's most highly organised specialist caste groups", and adds that the hierarchical system had its origins in times prior to the Portuguese intervention.

Their conversion may have enabled them to participate more significantly in religious ceremonies than was the case when they were Hindus; this being because their fishing and related occupation (that is, the taking of life) would have prevented any central contribution in Hindu religious rituals. This was certainly the outcome following Pope Clement XIV's dissolution of the Society of Jesus in 1773, which resulted in a dearth of Catholic misisonaries and priests in the area, enabling the jati thalavan and his fellow caste notables to assume the role of solemniser for rituals such as marriage.

Paravar Christianity, with its own identity based on a mixture of Christian-Catholic religious belief and Hindu caste culture, remains a defining part of the Paravar life today, the early work of missionaries and in the 1540s having been reinforced by others who succeeded them and by the jati thalavan, the latter also being known as the "little king". Kaufmann explains this Christianity as being "in effect a 'caste lifestyle' for the Paravas", whilst Zupanov gives an example of how the missionaries modified Catholic teaching to suit the Paravars by citing the example of Henrique Henriques, who told them that "in the beginning there were no Muslims, only Jews and Tamils".

There are also evidences to show that the Portuguese used some Paravars in their maritime exploitations overseas.

=== Dutch control ===
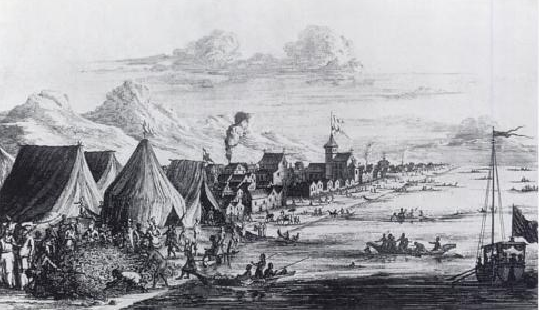
Pearl Fishery at Tuticorin camp, 1662, by Johan Nieuhof.

A report written in 1622 stated that the fisheries had been moribund for many years due to the poverty of the Paravars; it is uncertain as to what period this refers or the cause of the poverty. Xavier had recorded that the oyster beds seemed to have an uneven cyclical pattern, with a few good years of production alternating with a rather longer period of poor production. Similarly, around 1490 Ahmad ibn Mājid wrote that the fisheries "flourish in some years, but appear dead in others." One contemporary explanation for these changes was that the beds became covered by the shifting sea sands. A study of the period 1666–1916 showed that while the good harvests did tend to alternate between the Indian and the Sri Lankan sides of the Gulf, the latter side was more than twice as productive.

Control of the fisheries passed from the Portuguese to the Dutch from 1658, along with sovereignty over the Paravars. The new rulers, who were Protestant, tried unsuccessfully to convert the Paravars to their own faith. One example of this attempt was the banning of the feast of Our Lady of Snows as a consequence of the Dutch taking over all the Catholic churches, many of which were turned into warehouses. This event had originated when a wood statuette of the Virgin Mary was moved by the Portuguese to the church of Our Lady of Mercy at Tuticorin in 1582, its installation being celebrated with a nine-day feast which was subsequently repeated annually and much enjoyed by the Paravars. The feast halted with the Dutch takeover but was reinstated from 1709, and three years later permission was granted for the building of a new church. It was the right of the jati thalavan always to make the first tug of the rope which was attached to a chariot containing the statuette and which marked the start of the festival. The veneration of the statuette has been called a "cult" and continues into modern times, although few outside the caste have such regard for it.

During the period of Catholic repression the Dutch East India Company also expelled all Catholic priests and outlawed Catholic baptisms and other rituals. Indeed, there are no surviving records to suggest that there was any evangelism at all, although they did build Tuticorin's first Protestant church in 1750. When told by the Dutch that they must become Calvinists, the Paravar responded:

"You say your religion is better than the religion which our great padre taught us. Well then, you must perform more miracles than he. Resurrect at least a dozen dead persons, for Xavier restored to life five or six here; heal all our sick; increase the number of fishes in our sea; and then we shall see what answer we will give you."

During their period of control the Dutch also established a cloth factory in Tuticorin and this was a much appreciated venture — at some point the Paravars had also become traders in cloth.

=== British control ===
The British took over control in 1796, after a period of gradual usurpation of Dutch authority along the coast and elsewhere by the East India Company. They had seized Tuticorin in 1785. Both sides had attempted to influence the Paravars, seeking to have their support to exploit the riches of the fishery waters. The new government continued to recognise the Paravar's hierarchical social structure, as the Dutch and Portuguese had done before them. However, until 1813 the Company did not officially allow Christian missionaries to operate in the areas under its control, bowing only then due to pressure from religious organisations in Britain. The company was suspicious of any potential political undertones spread by the missionaries and was eager to keep trade running smoothly by operating a policy of non-interventionist conservatism in matters religious and cultural.

Bayly has examined why it was that some among the low-ranking Paravars were able to rise to work in occupations that were both more prestigious and more financially rewarding than had been the case before the conversion to Christianity, She points out that the Paravars held much the same rank as the Mukkavars, who were also a maritime caste of the area and were converted but did not demonstrate the same subsequent socio-economic mobility. (It has, however, been argued that the Mukkavars were "a sub-class of the Parava[r] community" and formed the largest group of those converted to Christianity during Xavier's time). Robinson has said

Far more prosperous than the Mukkuvar, their access to wealth, and then to education, after conversion ensured that they could attempt to spread out, urbanize, acquire new skills and enter different professions. All these aided in the process of upward social mobility."

When the Jesuit missionaries returned in the 1830s, following the revival of their Society, they were shocked at the lapse in formal religious observance and in general Christian morality, as well as the opulent lifestyle being led by the Paravar elite which contrasted with the dilapidated state of the churches. Around that time some of the Paravar elite, along with some other groups such as Nadar traders, were making significant amounts of money from a surge in export demand for processed cotton, using their existing wealth from the pearl fisheries as a means to expand their interests into this booming sector. By 1845 Tuticorin was the location of the main cotton export activities in southern India and by the end of the century it was the fifth largest port in the entire of India.

In 1841, the Jesuits' attempt to re-assert their authority over the elite by supporting the aspirations of a rising group of lesser Paravars who had also managed to gain from the Cotton trade and boom and had hopes of validating their success with an appropriate rank in the hierarchy. These people were traders, often spending long periods of time away from home in such places as Goa and Sri Lanka. Even lower down the ranks, the rise in ship and cargo movements, the continued development of Tuticorin harbour and town, and similar consequences of the boom (including the requirement for food by those who had moved away from working directly in fishing or on the land) was providing increasingly profitable work. The Paravar elite continued their traditional role, organising this labour as they had done for the pearl fisheries. They also absorbed into their ranks those members of the caste who had profited from independent trading, this being achieved by requiring the newcomers to pay a fee and swear allegiance to the jati thalivan. However, there were people who had been cast aside from the elite as a consequence of falling out with the jati, and others who wanted recognition more quickly than the system allowed. These disaffected people were the target of the Jesuit actions, which consisted primarily of providing them with status symbols such as the offer of additional Te Deums and bells at marriage ceremonies. The end result of this attempt to foment a new hierarchy, however, was a riot and a successful move by the jati to replace the Jesuits with Goan Padroados as ministers to his people and officiators at the church of Our Lady of Snows. The Jesuits continued trying to split the caste for a further thirty years but rarely had more than temporary successes: the ranks of the disaffected were swollen by new arrivals but also diminished by those who left as a consequence of having obtained satisfaction from the elite.

The Jesuits had gone so far as to establish an alternative cathedral, the Sacred Heart, in the hope of drawing worshippers from Our Lady of Snows. That, too, failed in its purpose. There were also several instances where the disputes — often relating to rights in regard to religious buildings and their precincts — were taken through the court system, and also more occasions when riots between the factions occurred.

The death of the jati thalavan in 1889 without a male heir gave rise to a power vacuum and so presented a new opportunity for the Jesuits. Combined with this was another boom in maritime trading, this time involving the plantations of Ceylon, which served to swell the ranks of those aspiring for recognition as members of the elite. The Jesuits employed various measures intended to drive a wedge between the two groups and to limit the subservience displayed towards the jati and other senior caste members which, the Jesuits believed, infringed on the true worship of God because offerings of money and goods were made to those people as part of Paravan church rituals. They went so far as to attempt to install an alternative jati and the battle for control continued for several years.

The Jesuits were not helped in their aim by the British government, who in 1891 renegotiated the arrangements for sharing the fishery catches with the new, non-Jesuit appointed jati thalavan. This deal, in which it was agreed that the jati should receive the output of one boat for that of every thirty which went to the government, once again confirmed the support of the ruling power for the caste hierarchy. The new jati was himself controversial among the Paravars: his appointment to the role, being the son of the previous headman's daughter, was thought by some to be invalid because the succession had passed through the female line.

In the late nineteenth century the Paravar elite tried to reconcile with the Muslim seafarers in their area, seeking to claim kinship. This went as far as the then jati thalivan declaring that the elite among these Marakkar Muslims, from towns such as Kilakarai, were in fact related to him by blood as they shared common antecedents. There was a tactical purpose to these decisions as by these actions he wanted to assert that he had authority over them. Furthermore, it was in the economic interests of the Paravars to foster these relationships because under British rule it was often the Marakkar who were granted the licences to operate the fisheries. Simultaneously, the Paravars were attempting to dissociate themselves from other Christian castes, whom they thought to be of a lower standing than themselves, such as the Nadars. Although they regarded the Nadar Christians as their equal in the past. The Nadars had been enthusiastic in their conversion to Christianity but did so much later than the Paravars, with surges of conversion — both to Catholicism and Protestantism — taking place in 1802–1803, the 1840s and the late 1870s/early 1880s. Dyron Daughrity has said that the conversions were "largely because of the increase in social status that could be effected" but adds that

there are occasions when the Christian community would become out-cast. The issues were complex. If the new converts could convince the entire caste to convert, the social status of the group could actually increase. Individuals who converted were often forced to abandon their community and move in order to find Christian support. The often difficult situations regarding conversion and caste exist to this day."

However, the combination of Jesuit pressure and then also that of the Goan Padroados, who came to agree that the ritual role of the jati was detrimental to belief, caused the gradual erosion of the jati's powers of patronage and organisation. This situation was assisted by the growing number of people aspiring to be members of the elite and those who disputed the validity of the succession as a consequence of the female lineage. The ceremonial role of the jati in religious observance and ceremony was gradually reduced, including the removal of status symbols such as the special seat that he occupied for Mass, and with these actions went much of his influence over the caste. By 1900 there were strikes taking place among the pearl and chank divers, often for frivolous reasons; the jati was unable to impose the discipline upon them which once had been a primary role.

As the caste hierarchy disintegrated, becoming a range of groups each seeking to assert their position, the role of the jati thalavan became more and more impossible and was eventually abandoned, the last occupant of the post having been installed in 1926. The introduction of new technologies in the post-World War II era such as such as nylon fishing nets, refrigeration and motorisation made fishing more lucrative as an occupation in its own right which removed the economic differences between those who laboured and those who either traded or lived off the organisation of labour. With this difference gone, the distinction between the Paravar elite and the majority of the community lost its basis and became obsolete, and the hierarchy within the community disappeared.

=== Post-independence ===
In 1947, the fisheries became a monopoly of the new independent Indian government. In the 1970s the power of the jati thalaivan and the Paravar elite was shattered by the repatriation of Tamil traders from Sri Lanka. In the present-day, the ritual significance of the jati thalaivan has been replaced by some of the more prosperous families involved in export of seafood. It is usually one of these families who pulls first at the Golden Carriage during Our Lady of Snows festival and is the chief donor for the associated rites.

As of 2011, Paravars were classified as a Most backward caste in most of Tamil Nadu by the Government of Tamil Nadu. Until 2009, Christian Paravars were classified as a Backward Caste.

In 2009 the government of Tamil Nadu issued an order designating Christian Paravars within its jurisdiction as being of the Most Backward Classes (MBC), a designation regarding their socio-economic status which entitles them to various assistance measures, primarily in the form of positive discrimination, if they should require it. These designations are flexible and subject to change at various times, according to determined need.

== Occupations ==
Historically, the Paravars were involved in sea-related activities such as pearl diving, fishing, navigation, boatbuilding and the making of salt.

It is known that during the visit of Francis Xavier the Paravars were using two different types of boat for net fishing, which he called the vallam and the toni. The latter was also used for trips to other coastal settlements and for trading journeys as far away as the Maldives. They were both large, open vessels with masts as well as oars; the sails were made with cotton, stiffened by boiling with roots and cow dung, and the fishing nets were made from coconut fibre. However, Iyengar believes that the toni was a hide-covered wicker basket similar to a coracle.

There is uncertainty regarding whether or not the present boats called vallam are similar to the ones described 500 years ago. Hornell's report of 1920 described the single-masted vallam in use around that time at being about 9 metres (30 ft) long and with a cargo capacity of around 2 tons. In 1914 he had described a larger three-masted boat, called the dhoni, which was used for pearl fishing and ferrying between anchored ships and Tuticorin harbour, as well as coastal journeys. The dhoni may owe its origin to Arab designs but could equally be indigenous. Today, most boats are motorized and many fishermen have trawler boats.

The Paravars also used boats similar to catamarans and, indeed, that word comes from the Tamil katturmaran (tied tree). It would seem that the design was developed independently of those used in Polynesia. An 1895 traveller describes them as a hollowed-out tree trunk up to 20 feet (6.1 m) long which is connected to a smaller trunk acting as an outrigger using lashes and two arched lengths of bamboo. The voyager and explorer William Dampier had described seeing them in 1699.

=== The Bharathas of Sri Lanka ===
During the cotton boom in the mid 19th century, some of the Paravars took to the textile trade. Starting in the 1860's, some of the entrepreneurs and merchants among the Paravars started setting up businesses in Ceylon (present-day Sri Lanka). Many flourished in businesses in Sri Lanka that the Paravas (known as Bharathas in Sri Lanka) are widely recognised as a merchant community in Sri Lanka, known for their business acumen and also for their charity. The Bharatha businessmen donated large parcels of land to various Catholic religious societies to build schools and places of worship in Sri Lanka.

Some Bharathas in Sri Lanka also made a mark in business, politics, sports, etc. Bharatha merchant icons like M.P Gomez, J.L. Carwallio & F.X Pereira started Sri Lanka's first departmental stores.

F.X. Pereira's son, I. X. Pereira, was elected to the legislative council of ceylon, and later became Minister of Labour, Industry and Commerce in the government. During World War II, he was appointed to the War Council, by the British. A postal stamp was issued by the Sri Lankan government in his honour, in 1988.

Former English cricketer Dimitri Mascarenhas was born to Bharatha parents in London, England. He holds the record for most runs in an over in a One Day International for England, with 30, scored off Yuvraj Singh of India on 5 September 2007.

== Family names ==
The Paravars were probably a primarily endogamous society until the arrival of the Portuguese, marrying only within their own caste and so keeping the tribal ties strong. Subsequently, they became exogamous and from this came the use of names based on Portuguese origin. Family names such as Fernando, Costa, da Cruz and Roche are a direct consequence of these marriages, and familiar names, such as Susai (a Tamil translation of Joseph), reflect both the marriages and the general Portuguese influence. Robinson offers a different thesis, claiming that they remained endogamous even after conversion, that these family ties strengthened their ability to ascend socially and that the use of Christian family names was in fact a privilege granted to them by the Portuguese and deemed to be a sign of their superiority over other castes such as the Mukkuvars.

There are four family names of non-Christian origin still in common use, these being Kalingarayan, Villavarayan, Poobalarayan and Rayan. These names are thought possibly to have their origin in arayan, which was used by Tamil fishing groups as a caste title. Arayan is claimed by some modern descendants of the Paravars to be itself derived from rayya (rajah, king) and "MOTHA" is the surname of all jatithalavas who ruled and it is also followed till now.

== Contributions ==
The first Tamil booklet was printed in 1554 (11 February) in Lisbon - Cartilha em lingoa Tamul e Portugues in Romanized Tamil script by Vincente de Nazareth, Jorge Carvalho and Thoma da Cruz, all from the Paravar community. It was financed by the Paravars who also helped with scholarly assistance. Later, after the arrival of printing press in India, Henrique Henriques, a Portuguese missionary, had acknowledged the support and financial assistance provided by the community in printing his books such as;

- Confessionary (Confessionairo,1580)
- Lives of Saints (Flos Sanctorum, 1586)

The books were printed at Punnaikayal, the first Tamil printing press, which was set up in the year 1579.

== Notable people ==
- Senhor Don Gabriel de Cruz Vaz (Parathavarma Pandian) was a notable king of the Paravars who helped Maruthu Pandiyar and other freedom fighters. This king was also responsible for the construction of the Golden Car of the Basilica of Our Lady of Snows, Thoothukudi. He was also known as Pandiapathy.
- Dewan Bahadur Chevalier I. X. Pereira (Ignatius Xavier Pereira) KCSS, colonial-era Sri Lankan businessman and politician. He became a Chevalier of the Order of St. Sylvester, which is one of the five orders of knighthood awarded directly by the Pope as Supreme Pontiff and head of the Catholic Church and as the Head of State of Vatican City.
- Rao Bahadur Cruz Fernandez (Legislator) was an Indian businessman. He was the longest serving chairman of Tuticorin Municipality and is considered the father and architect of Modern Tuticorin.
- Chevalier J. L. P. Roche Victoria (Former State Minister from Tamil Nadu). Victoria became a Chevalier of the Order of St. Gregory the Great
- J.P. Chandrababu Rodriguez was an Indian actor, comedian, playback singer and film director.
- Charles Lucas Anthony was a Sri Lankan Tamil rebel and leading member of the Liberation Tigers of Tamil Eelam (LTTE), a separatist Tamil militant organisation in Sri Lanka.
- Bishop Francis Tiburtius Roche (First indigenous bishop of Latin Rite in India, in China, in Asia and in Africa).
- Bishop Peter Fernando (Former Bishop of Tuticorin Diocese and Archbishop of Madurai Diocese) was a Roman Catholic bishop, who was born on 22 March 1939 in Idinthakarai. He was ordained a priest for the diocese of Tuticorin on 31 May 1971
- Bishop Thomas Fernando (Former Bishop of Tuticorin & Trichy Dioceses, Participated in the Second Vatican Council, Helped poet Kannadasan to write Yesu Kaviyam, Founder of Kalai Kaveri College) was born on 9 May 1913 in Idinthakarai. He founded a congregation of St Thomas Catechetical Sisters in Tirichirapalli. He is hailed for helping Tamil poet Kannadasan write Yesu Kaviyam
- Bishop Antony Devotta (Former Bishop of Trichy Diocese, First Indian Bishop and second bishop in the worldwide Catholic Church to donate his body).
- Bishop Nazarene Soosai. Bishop Nazarene Soosai was born to Soosi and Panipitchai as their 8th child on 13 April 1963, at Rajakkamangalam Thurai of Kanyakumari district in Tamil Nadu. He is the sixth bishop of Kottar diocese.
- Bishop Fidelis Fernando. (born 20 May 1948) is a Sri Lankan priest and current Roman Catholic Bishop of Mannar. The family were devout Catholics, and part of the Sri Lankan Bharatha community descended from immigrants from Vembar, Tamil Nadu.
- Bishop Eugene Joseph. Bishop Eugene Joseph is the current serving bishop of the Roman Catholic Diocese of Varanasi, India. He was born in Rajakkamangalam Thurai, Tamil Nadu, India, on 31 July 1958 to Mr. Siluvadimai Fernando and Mrs. Antoniammal Rodriquez.
- Ilanji Vel is one among the ancient velirs of the Yadu Kingdom.[1] He ruled a territory called Ilanji, near Courtallam. He belongs to the clan of ancient Pandyas.
- Joe D'Cruz is a Tamil writer, novelist and documentary film director from Tamil Nadu, India.
- S. M. Diaz IPS was a former Inspector-General of Police of Tamil Nadu.
- G. Nanchil Kumaran served as Police commissioner in Chennai, and he became famous for helping solve the 1998 Coimbatore bombings.
- Lourdammal Simon was an Indian politician and former Member of the Legislative Assembly and Minister for Local Administration and Fisheries of Madras State during 1957–1962.
- Ambrose Fernando was an Indian businessman and politician. Member of Legislative Assembly Ex-MLA in Travancore-Cochin State.
- Valampuri John (Tamil Writer, Orator and Former member of Rajya Sabha).
- Ignaci Siluvai (Catholic Priest & Educator).
- S. Jennifer Chandran was an Indian politician and was a Member of the Legislative Assembly.
- Dimitri Mascarenhas, a former English cricketer.
- M. Anto Peter M. Anto Peter Ramesh (26 April 1967 – 12 July 2012) was a Tamil Software vendor and technical writer.He was the Managing Director of Softview Media College through which he educated the students in the field of Multimedia, Print Media, Graphics, Animation and also develops Tamil fonts and Tamil typing Software.
- Cottalango Leon is an Indian-American computer graphics technician who won the Academy Award for scientific and technical achievement jointly with Sam Richards and J. Robert Ray in 2016
- Donatus Victoria, Sir Joseph Aloysius Donatus Victoria, CBE was a British politician. He was one of the first elected members of the Senate of Ceylon. He was appointed an Officer of the Order of the British Empire (OBE) in the 1945 Birthday Honours while serving as a Contractor in British India, Commander of the Order (CBE) in 1948, and knighted in the 1950 Birthday Honours.
- Jeyaraj. Thomas Jeyaraj Fernando is a renowned painter in Tamilnadu. He has illustrated the works of more than 400 writers - mainly cover art, artwork, comics and as a costume designer for films. Along with friends, he has run a manuscript magazine called sculptor.
- Elred Kumar, Elred Kumar Santhanam is an Indian film director, screenwriter and film producer best known for his work on Ko, Muppozhudhum Un Karpanaigal, and Vinnaithaandi Varuvaayaa. His films were made under his production house, RS Infotainment.
- Susaigomez, Susai Antony Gomez was a ship captain for the Indian Navy and also as well as the British navy in 1950s. He is also known as parathar Kula pambattiyar in thoothukudi and as well as kanyakumari. He was the first and foremost captain commander in chief from kanyakumari district

== See also ==
- Indian Christians
- Bharatha people

== Bibliography ==
- Bayly, Susan (2004). Saints, Goddesses and Kings: Muslims and Christians in South Indian society, 1700 – 1900 (Reprinted ed.). Cambridge: Cambridge University Press. ISBN 978-0-521-89103-5.
- Donkin, Robin A. (1998). "Beyond price: pearls and pearl-fishing: origins to the age of discoveries". Memoirs of the American Philosophical Society. 224. American Philosophical Society. ISBN 978-0-87169-224-5.
- Iyengar, P. T. Srinivasa (1929). History of the Tamils: from the earliest times to 600 A.D. (4th, reprinted ed.). Asian Educational Services. ISBN 978-81-206-0145-1.
- Maynard, Theodore (1936). The odyssey of Francis Xavier. Longsman, Green.
- Neill, Stephen (2004). A History of Christianity in India: The Beginnings to AD 1707 (Reprinted ed.). Cambridge University Press. ISBN 978-0-521-54885-4.
- Subrahmanian, N. (1980). Śaṅgam polity: the administration and social life of the Śaṅgam Tamils (Revised ed.). Ennes.
- Thurston, Edgar; Rangachari, K. (1909). Castes and Tribes of Southern India. Vol. 6. Madras: Government Press.
