= Pearl Fishery Coast =

Refers to a coastal area of southern India

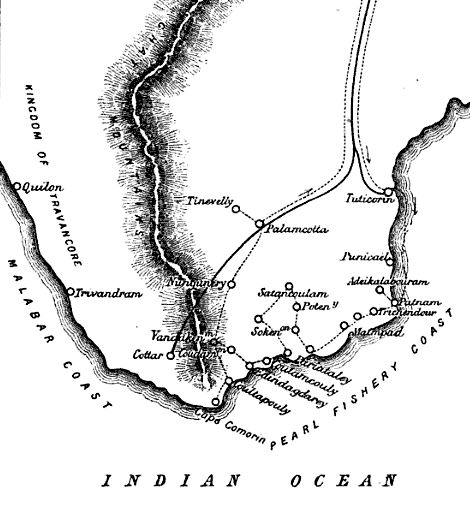
Map of the Pearl Fishery Coast, on the southeast portion of the Indian peninsula.

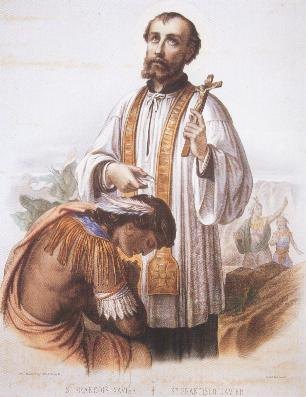
Francis Xavier, in a 19th-century colored lithograph.

The Pearl Fishery Coast refers to a coastal area of southern India, extending along the Coromandel Coast from Tuticorin to Comorin ruled by Paravars and their rulers.

The coast took its name from the presence of pearls along the coast, and the numerous pearl fisheries that operated to harvest them.

In a conflict between the Paravas and the Arabs in 1532, the Paravas sought protection from the Portuguese. In 1535, the Portuguese led an army under Pedro Vaz and expelled the Arabs. As a compensation, the Paravas accepted to convert to Christianity.

The Portuguese conquered the Pearl Fishery Coast from the Muslims of Kayalpattanam in 1525. They restored the rights of the Paravas to exploit their fisheries in exchange for a considerable annual tribute.

The Paravas, who lived along the Pearl Fishery Coast adopted Christianity in 1535–1536, becoming an important Christian region, and succeeded the first introduction of Christianity in Mylapore with the Thomas Christians. The Portuguese derived considerable profit from the pearl trade, and strictly controlled the Pearl Fishery Coast through the Padroado system.

The missionary Francis Xavier, coming from Goa, reached the Pearl Fishery Coast in 1542, where he was able to evangelize successfully the Paravars, converting an estimated 40,000 to 50,000 souls, although he is said to have accomplished this extraordinary achievement "largely due to his judicious mixture of threats and blandishments, 'and now with the favours that he promised them, and at times adding some threats of the harm that might come to them if the [Portuguese] captain deprived them of their fishing and seaborne trade'".

In 1553, a fleet of the Ottoman Empire made a raid on the Pearl Fishery Coast around Tuticorin. They were assisted by the Marakkar Muslims of Malabar, and had the tacit agreement of Vittula Nayak of Madurai. 52 Portuguese were captured at Punnaikayal, and churches burnt down. The Ottomans failed however in 1553 against a Portuguese fleet at sea near al-Fahl.

There were numerous conflicts between the Christian Paravas and the Muslims for control of the fisheries.

== See also ==
- Industry in ancient Tamil country
- Vembar
- Vaipar
- Tuticorin
- Punnaikayal
- Virapandianpatnam
- Manapad
- Kuthenkuly
- Keelavaippar
- Periathalai
- Margaritifer Terra and the Margaritifer Sinus quadrangle in Mars were named after this coast
- Idinthakarai
