= Ambrose Fernando =

Indian politician

S. Ambrose Fernando

Member of Legislative Assembly in Travancore-Cochin State
- In office 1948–1952

Personal details
- Born: 1912 Kanyakumari
- Died: 1999 (aged 86–87) Tuticorin
- Party: Travancore Tamil Nadu Congress (TTNC) & Indian National Congress
- Profession: Politician

Ambrose Fernando (1912 – 11 January 1999) was an Indian businessman and politician.

== Early life ==
Fernando was born in Kanyakumari to a Paravar family. At a young age, He went to Colombo to work but returned to Kanyakumari in 1937 and married Mochammal Fernando. He joined the Indian National Congress and entered politics.

== Politics ==
He became a member of the then newly created Travancore Cochin Legislative Assembly representing Kanyakumari from 20 March 1948 to 18 February 1952. He took an active part in the agitation to separate Kanyakumari district from Kerala and to join it to Madras State, now Tamil Nadu state.

=== Government posts ===
- Chairman, Quality control appellate Panel, Fish and Fisheries Products
- Vice Chairman, Marine Products Export Development Authority
- Member of:
  - Bureau of I.S.I Fish and Fisheries Products Sectional Committee
  - Consultative Committee Fishery Survey of India
  - Regional Management Committee of C.M.F.R.I Tuticorin

He wrote many articles on his recommendations for the welfare of the fishing community. One such article titled "Problems Facing the Fishermen of the Beche-De-Mer Industry" was published by Central Marine Fisheries Research Institute.

== Business ==
Fernando later started a dry fish export business in Tuticorin and developed an interest in fisheries. He was invited by the central and state governments to join various fish industry meetings based on his suggestions to develop fisheries as well as the trade. He was a member of various government delegations which visited other countries to study the trade.

=== Business posts ===
President of:

- Fish Exporters Chamber, Tuticorin
- Tuticorin Catamaran Fishermen's Association
- KanyaKumari Township Fisherman Development Organization
- Tuticorin Citizen Council

== Recognition ==
Fernando was honored by the government and industry jointly, being awarded the title Pioneer in Fisheries.
