= Ariyanayagipuram =

- village
- Nickname: Ariyai
- Location in Tamil Nadu, India Ariyanayagipuram (India)
- Coordinates: 9.112596°N 78.252640°E
- Country: India
- State: Tamil Nadu
- District: Tuticorin
- Named after: Ariyanachiyamman kovil

Population (2001)
  - Total: 1,333

Languages
  - Official: Tamil
- Time zone: UTC+5:30 (IST)
- PIN: 628901
- Telephone code: 04638
- Sex ratio: 1032 ♂/♀
- Lok Sabha constituency: Tuticorin
- Vidhan Sabha constituency: Vilathikulam

Ariyanayagipuram is a gram panchayat in Thoothukudi district (also known as Tuticorin district) in the Indian state of Tamil Nadu.

== Education ==
There are two schools in Ariyanayagipuram, namely Government High School and Pariyathul hazanath elementary school (which located at heart of the town). There are around 8 village students are studying at Ariyanayagipuram's Schools. After completing the high school, students generally goes to nearby town Vilathikulam for higher secondary school which is run by Government. Nowadays people want their children to study in private schools. So, they prefer either Tuticorin or Kovilpatti for education. Nearby village Reddiyapatti, Nearby town Vilathikulam.

== Politics ==
Ariyanayagipuram is part of Vilathikulam assembly constituency.
