= Vilvamarathupatti =

- Village
- Location within Tamil Nadu Location within India
- Coordinates: 9°9′35″N 78°10′14″E
- Country: India
- State: Tamil Nadu
- District: Thoothukudi
- Time zone: UTC+05:30 (IST)

Vilvamarathupatti is a village in the panchayat town of Vilathikulam, in Thoothukudi district, in the Indian state of Tamil Nadu. The village is located in the hear of the Karisal Kaadu region. The area has black soil and a clay-like stickiness. The climate of Karisal Kaadu is semi-arid, and has hot and dry summers. The temperature and humidity of the region are often high, being close to the equator and around 25 kilometres (16 mi) from the shore. Due to the clay-like soil retains moisture well, meaning that crops such as paddy and sugar-cane cannot be grown. However, punsei crops such as green chilli and sunflowers can be grown. The village has around 500 families living in it. The main sources of income come from agriculture, cattle form and haze gray.

== Etymology ==
The name, "Vilvamarathupatti" comes from a vilvam (bael) tree. It is a combination of "Vilvamaram" and "village".

== Demographics ==
As of 2001, Vilvamarathupatti had a population of 2000. Males constitute 45% of the population and females 55%. Vilvamarathupatti has an average literacy rate of 48%.
