= Patrick Paul D'Souza =

- Bishop of Varanasi
- Church: Catholic Church
- Diocese: Diocese of Varanasi
- In office: 5 June 1970 – 24 February 2007
- Predecessor: Jérôme Malenfant
- Successor: Raphy Manjaly

Orders
- Ordination: 20 December 1953
- Consecration: 8 August 1970 by Valerian Gracias

Personal details
- Born: 28 April 1928 Bendur, Mangalore, Kingdom of Mysore, British Raj, British Empire
- Died: 16 October 2014 (aged 86)

Patrick Paul D'Souza (28 August 1928 – 16 October 2014) was a Roman Catholic bishop.

Ordained to the priesthood on 20 December 1953, D'Souza was named bishop of the Diocese of Banaras on 5 June 1970 and was ordained bishop on 8 August 1970.

D'Souza retired on 24 February 2007.
