= Sivalarpatti =

- town
- Location in Tamil Nadu, India
- Coordinates: 9.60°N 78.1°E
- Country: India
- State: Tamil Nadu
- District: Thoothukudi
- Elevation: 97 m (318 ft)

Languages
  - Official: Tamil
- Time zone: UTC+5:30 (IST)
- PIN: 628905
- Telephone code: 04638

Sivalarpatti (Village ID 642306) is a village in Thoothukudi district in the state of Tamil Nadu, India. Sivalarpatti is about 65 km from Madurai and 21 km from Aruppukottai. This village which comes under Vilathikulam taluk. According to the 2011 census it has a population of 2430 living in 685 households. Its main agriculture product is whole green gram growing.

== Geography ==
The climate is usually hot, with rains during September - November. Temperatures during summer reach a maximum of 40 and a minimum of 25 degrees Celsius. Winter temperatures range between 25 and 19 degrees Celsius. The average annual rainfall is about 75 cm.

== Transport ==
This village is well-connected with road transport and have frequent buses to the important adjacent towns like Aruppukottai, Vilathikulam, Nagalapuram, Pudhur, Pandalkudi, Madurai, Coimbatore and Thoothukudi. Apart from this, AMARNATH and JAYAVILAS private buses are running to Chennai & SUPAA travels do the service of Coimbatore on daily basis.

== Occupation ==
Agriculture is the important occupation of this village people. Red chillies, Sunflower, onions, tamarind, banana, dhall items are some of the important cultivated crops in this village and its surrounding areas. Matchbox making is also the important occupation here.

== Education ==
School facilities are not well in this village. Only one primary school is located in this village on the road side. Apart from this, Government high school is located in pudhur, which is above 2 km from this village. The students of this village prefers on the other area schools which are located in Aruppukottai and Virudhunagar. The nearest college which is located near to this village is Sree Sowdambiga College of Engineering which is about 15 km from this village.

== Politics ==
This village which comes under Vilathikulam state legislative assembly and under thoothukudi for lok sabha member of parliament election.
