= Vilathikulam =

Neighbourhood in Thoothukudi district, Tamil Nadu, India

Vilathikulam Vilathai
- Location in Tamil Nadu, India
- Coordinates: 9.1316°N 78.1646°E
- Country: India
- State: Tamil Nadu
- District: Thoothukudi
- Elevation: 47 m (154 ft)

Population (2011)
  - Total: 15,277

Languages
  - Official: Tamil
- Time zone: UTC+5:30 (IST)
- PIN: 628907
- Telephone code: 04638

Vilathikulam is a selection grade panchayat town in Thoothukudi district in the Indian state of Tamil Nadu. It is a small town near the southern tip of mainland India.

Vilathikulam is a little town, on the northern bank of the Vaippar River, which has water flowing only 15 to 25 days per year. It had major issue as the bridge connecting the Vilathikulam town on the southern side to the Kovilpatti and Tuticorin routes gets submerged completely when the river flows. It is a single lane bridge constructed during the British Era and is about 1.5 km in length. In year 2012, new double-way Bridge was constructed adjacent to the old bridge to avoid roads from getting submerged.

As the panacea of water problem a dam has been constructed across Vaippar River in 2006.

== Etymology ==
Vilathikulam owes its name to a temple pond "Vila" + "Athi" + "Kulam". The Meenakshi Amman Temple has a temple pond, which had a "Vila" tree and an "Athi" tree and hence, the name. Every year during Chithirai month, ( same day and dates as of Madurai Meenakshi amman Temple), Chithirai Festival is celebrated and ends with a Car Festival crowded by the people from nearby villages.

== Demographics ==
The total population of Vilathikulam is 15,277 out of which 7,681 are males and 7,596 are females thus the Average Sex Ratio of Vilathikulam is 989.The population of Children aged 0-6 years in Vilathikulam city is 1603 which is 10% of the total population. There are 807 male children and 796 female children between the age 0-6 years. Thus as per the Census 2011 the Child Sex Ratio of Vilathikulam is 986 which is less than Average Sex Ratio (989).As per the Census 2011, the literacy rate of Vilathikulam is 88.6%. Thus Vilathikulam has a higher literacy rate compared to 86.2% of Thoothukkudi district. The male literacy rate is 93.79% and the female literacy rate is 83.32% in Vilathikulam.

== Entertainment ==
"Sithirai Thiruvizha" in Meenakshi Amman temple is the most famous festival in Vilathikulam which will last for more than 10 days. Another big entertainment for the people in and around Vilathikulam is the famous "Rekla Race" (bull cart race), which happens usually for most festivals and functions. The people in and around Vilathikulam will host the "Rekla Race" and people from all over Tamil Nadu participate with their trained bulls.

Purana Nadagam (Stage shows) like "Arichantra Mayana Kandam", "Veera Pandiya Katta Pomman", "Valli Thirumanam", "Pavalak kodi" are arranged every year during the "pongal" festival at the Amman temple at Karisalkulam, Velidupatti, Singilipatti, Perilovanpatti, Lakshmi Puram and also some nearby villages. Other events at such festivals include Karakaattam, Narikurathi aattam, etc.

"Pathirakali Amman" temple festivals like "Silampattom" and "Mulaippari" are other major religious events in the region.

== Railway Projects ==
The Vilathikulam people's major expectation is that the proposed Railway line connecting Madurai-Tuticorin through Vilathikulam, Pudur, Pandalkudi and Aruppukottai, should bring in more developments to the region. The project is confirmed and now started.

== Politics ==
Vilathikulam assembly constituency is part of Thoothukudi (Lok Sabha constituency).

== Villages ==
(Idaichiyoorani)

- Attankarai
- A.Kumarapuram
- A.Kumarapuram(Bharvathi Nagar)
- A.Subrahmanyapuram
- Ayan Vadamalapuram-Achankulam
- Ariyanayagipuram
- Arungulam
- Ayan Sengalpadai
- Ayanbommiahpuram (PanayadiPatti)
- Bhutalapuram
- Bommayyapuram
- Chittayanayakkanpatti
- E.Velayudhapuram
- Elanthaikulam
- Guruvarpatti
- K.Duraiswamipuram
- K.Kumaraettaiyapuram
- K.Tangammalpuram

K.Subramaniyapuram

- Kadalkudi
- Kalloorani
- Kamalapuram
- Kammapatti
- Kandaswamypuram
- Kannimarkuttam
- Karisalkulam
- Kavundanpatti
- Kilvilathikulam
- Kodangipatti
- Kottanatham
- Kulakkattankurichi
- [Kulathur South]
- Kulattur(East)
- Kumarachittanpatti
- Kumaragiri
- Kumaralingapuram
- Kumarasakkanapuram
- Kunchaiya puram
- Kuralaiyampatti
- K.sundareswarapuram
- Lakshmipuram
- M.Kumarasakkanapuram
- M.Shanmukhapuram
- Madalapuram
- Madarajapuram
- Malliswarapuram
- Mandikkulam
- Maniyakaranpatti
- Mamunainarpuram
- Marthandampatti
- Maryarkudichattram
- Mavilodai
- Melkallurani
- Melmandai
- Metilpati
- Muthaiyapuram
- Muthusamypuram
- N.Jagavirapuram
- Nadukattur
- NAGALAPURAM
- Namasivayapuram
- Nedungulam
- Pallakulam
- Padarnthapuli
- P.Jagavirapuram
- Pattithevanpatti
- Periasamipuram
- Pudur
- Puliyangulam
- Pusanur
- Ramachandrapuram
- Sakkammalpuram
- Sallichettipatti
- Sankaralingapuram
- Senraya puram
- sundarapachaiya puram
- sennamareddi patti
- Sennampatti
- chinnavanaickenpatti
- Sinnur
- Sivagnanapuram
- Sivalarpatti
- T.Subbiahpuram
- Sundaranachchayyapuram
- Surangudi
- Tattaneri
- Vaippar-Nd
- Vaippar-St
- Vannipatti
- Vathalakarai
- Vauvaltotti
- Vedapatti
- Velidupatti
- Velliyammalpuram
- Vembar
- Venkteswarapuram
- Vilathikulam
- Vilvamarathupatti
- Virapandiapuram
- Vallinayagapuram
- Ayan Virisampatti
- Zaminkarisalkulam
- Vallinayakapuram
- Pattiyur
- Uttchinatham
- Sevalpatti
- Reguramapuarm
- Pudupatti
- Vowalthoti
- Thathaneri
- LeggenPatti

== Education ==
Schools

1. Government Higher Secondary School
2. TNDTA Middle School
3. Sharon Matriculation Higher Secondary School
4. Ambal Vidhyalaya (CBSE)
5. Kaviyarasar Annamalai Reddiyar Girls Higher Secondary School

Professional training Institutes

- Diplomas in nursing and catering offered by "Irin Raja Institute of Vocational Education"
