= Kammapatti =

- village
- Location in Tamil Nadu, India Kammapatti (India)
- Coordinates: 9.11°N 78.25°E
- Country: India
- State: Tamil Nadu
- District: Tuticorin

Population (2001)
  - Total: 1,333

Languages
  - Official: Tamil
- Time zone: UTC+5:30 (IST)
- PIN: 628901
- Telephone code: 04638
- Lok Sabha constituency: Tuticorin
- Vidhan Sabha constituency: Vilathikulam

Kammapatti is a village in the Virudhunagar district in India.
