= Cruz Fernandez =

Indian businessman

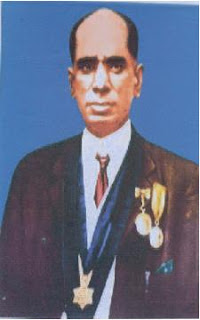
Rao Bahadur Cruz Fernandez

Rao Bahadur Cruz Fernandez (b. 15 November 1869) was an Indian businessman. He was the longest-serving chairman of Thoothukudi (Tuticorin) Municipality and is considered the father and architect of Modern Tuticorin.

== Early life ==
He is from Paravar caste,

== Personal life ==
He had one child, Joseph Innocent Fernandez. His eldest grandson was Regis Cruz Fernandez, who worked as a headmaster in a village school beginning in 1987. Regis had three children; Bennita Angile Fernandez, Regitta Filhppena Fernandez, and Joseph Innocent Fernandez.

== Career ==
He was elected to the chair of Tuticorin municipality five times between 1909 and 1927. He was awarded the title of Rao Bahadur by the Government and was elected to the Madras Legislative Assembly. The Municipality building (Rao Bahadur Cruz Fernandez Building) is named after him. Statues of him are installed in front of the Municipal Building and also in the midst of Tuticorin.

=== Drinking Water Scheme ===
In 1873 an open channel of 6.4 km length was excavated by the Public Works Department at cost of Rs. 4,000/- for diverting the water of the Korampallam irrigation tank to a reservoir on the outskirts of town. From this reservoir water was distributed to wells in the town by means of conduits and earthenware pipes laid by the municipal council at a cost of Rs. 9380/-/ In 1896 a comprehensive water supply scheme was recommended by the Sanitary Board. It consisted of two portions. The first portion was built in 1906 at a cost of Rs. 1,17,780/- and the second in April 1908. Later, it was found that the improvement of the Korampallam tank interfered with the irrigation interests of the ryots. Contamination in the drinking water, cholera and other water borne diseases occurred frequently.

Cruz Fernandez was Chairman of the Municipality during 1909, 1910, 1912, 1919 and 1925. He introduced a joint water supply scheme for Tuticorin, Tirunelveli and Palayamkottai from the Thamirabarani River near Vallanadu, which is 38 km from Tuticorin at a cost of Rs. 18,23,275/- in 1932. These Municipalities and the public works departments took action during 1914 to 1915. but World War I slowed its progress. In 1925 and 1926 the expenses of the project escalated to Rs. 27,83,765/-. Cruz Fernandez got this amount as grant and as loan and completed the scheme in 1938. The people of Tuticorin could then access potable water. Earlier when there was scarcity of water, Cruz Fernandez arranged shipment of water by train from Kadambur and by Thonis (Country Boats) from Sri Lanka. A water tax was levied on the people. Though initially it was criticized, the success of the programme silienced the opponents.
