= St. Mary's Church, Vendore =

Catholic church in India

St. Mary's Church Vendore
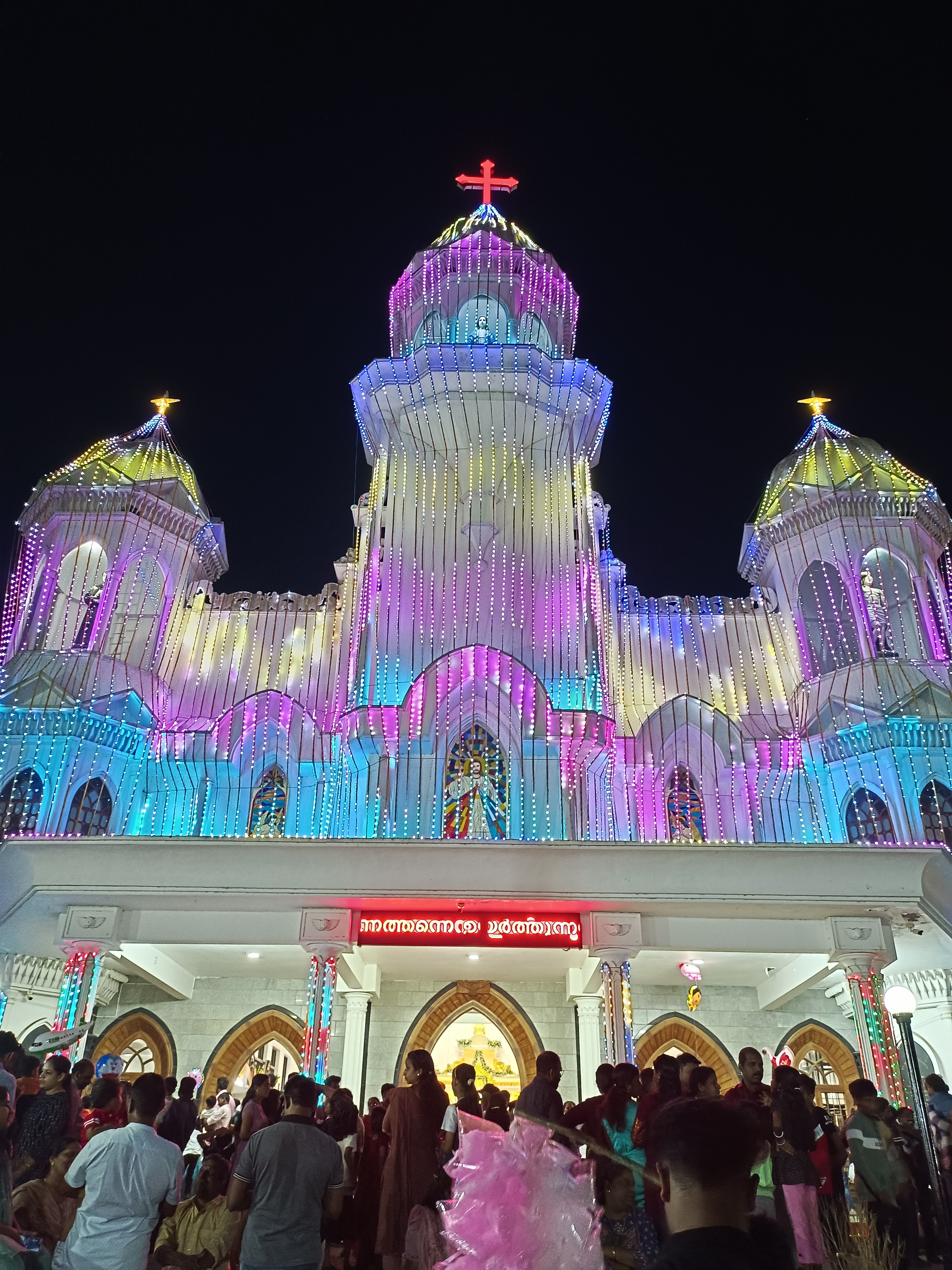
- The church in 2023

- Location within Kerala Location within India

Religion
- Affiliation: Syro-Malabar Catholic Church
- Leadership: Metropolitan Archbishop of Thrissur
- Year consecrated: 1927
- Status: Active

Location
- Location: Vendore, Thrissur District, Kerala
- Coordinates: 10.4331056°N 76.28031450000003°E

Architecture
- Completed: 1924
- Direction of façade: West

St. Mary's Church is a Syro-Malabar Catholic church in Vendore, Thrissur district, Kerala, India.
