= Ayan Virusampatti =

- village
- Location in Tamil Nadu, India Ayan Virusampatti (India)
- Coordinates: 9.11°N 78.25°E
- Country: India
- State: Tamil Nadu
- District: Tuticorin

Population (2001)
  - Total: 1,333

Languages
  - Official: Tamil
- Time zone: UTC+5:30 (IST)
- PIN: 628907
- Telephone code: 04638
- Sex ratio: 1032 ♂/♀
- Lok Sabha constituency: Tuticorin
- Vidhan Sabha constituency: Vilathikulam

Virusampatti (Village ID 642370) is a village located at 9.11°N 78.25°E, in Tamil Nadu, India. According to the 2011 census it has a population of 1288 living in 343 households. Its main agriculture product is chilli growing.
