= Periyathalai =

- Village
- Location in Tamil Nadu, India
- Coordinates: 8.3369039°N 77.9724254°E
- Country: India
- State: Tamil Nadu
- District: Thoothukudi

Languages
  - Official: Tamil
- Time zone: UTC+5:30 (IST)
- Postal code: 628705
- Telephone code: 04639
- Vehicle registration: TN 69, TN 92
- Lok Sabha constituency: Thoothukudi
- Vidhan Sabha constituency: Srivaikuntam

Periyathalai is a coastal hamlet located in the southern side of Tuticorin district in Tamil Nadu, India. It is about 53 km from Tirunelveli city. The taluk headquarters, Sattankulam, is 14 km north of Periyathalai.

In 2008, the district administration has announced that a state-of-the-art fish landing centre would be established on a 10-acre (40,000 m^{2}) area.

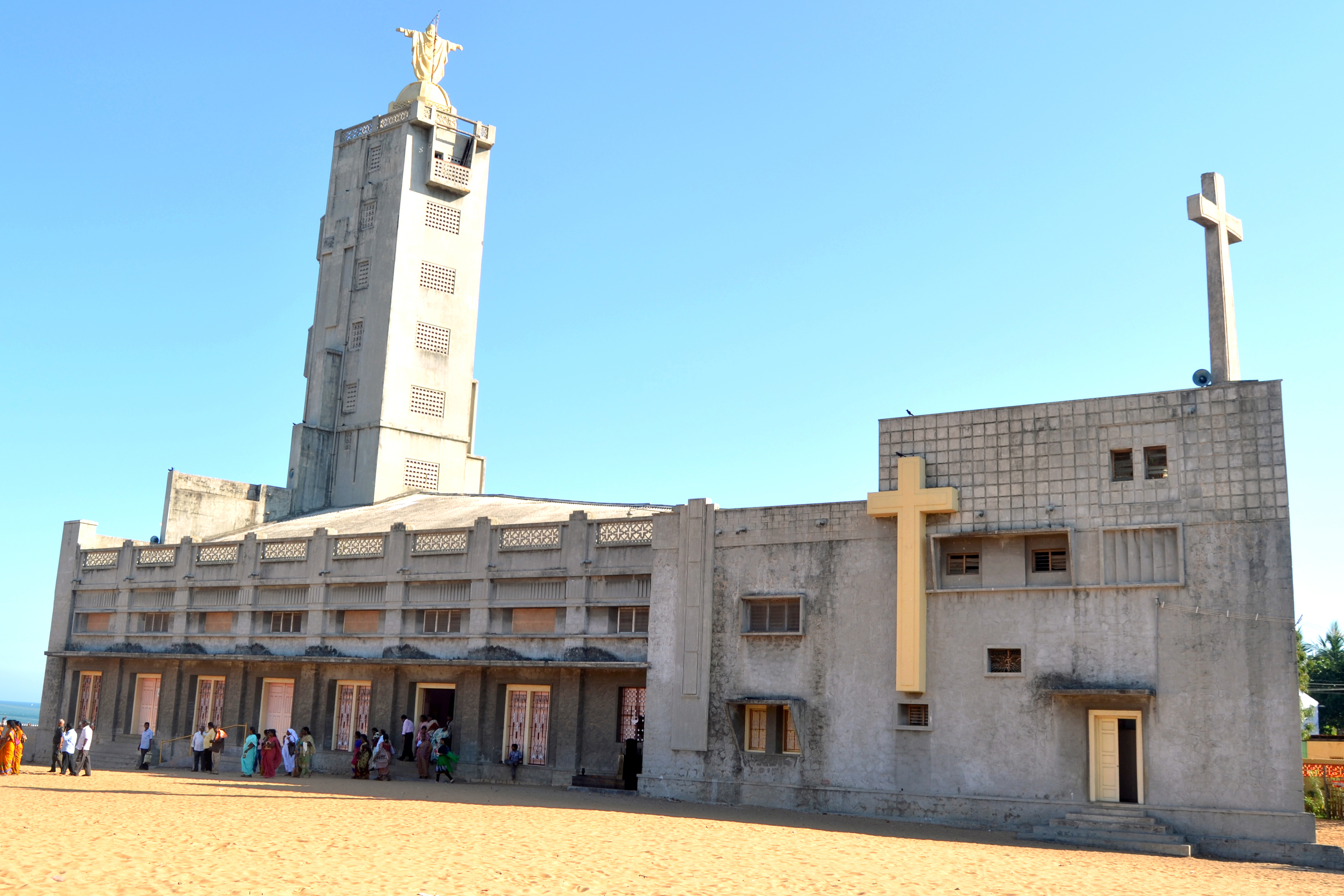
St.John and Stephens Church - SIDE VIEW, TAKEN FROM INSIDE THE COMPOUND

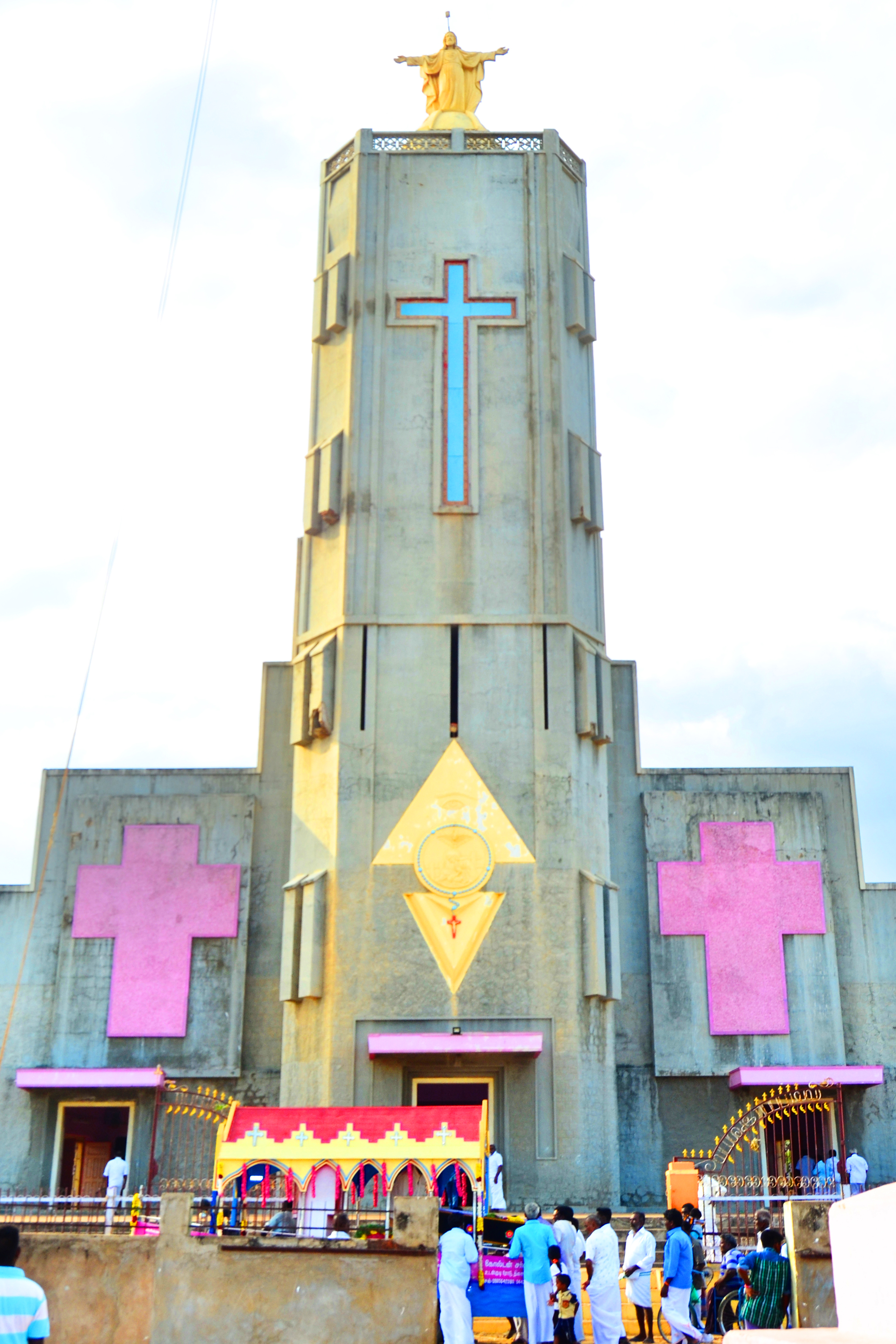
St.John and St.Stephens Church - PERIYATHALAI FRONT VIEW,

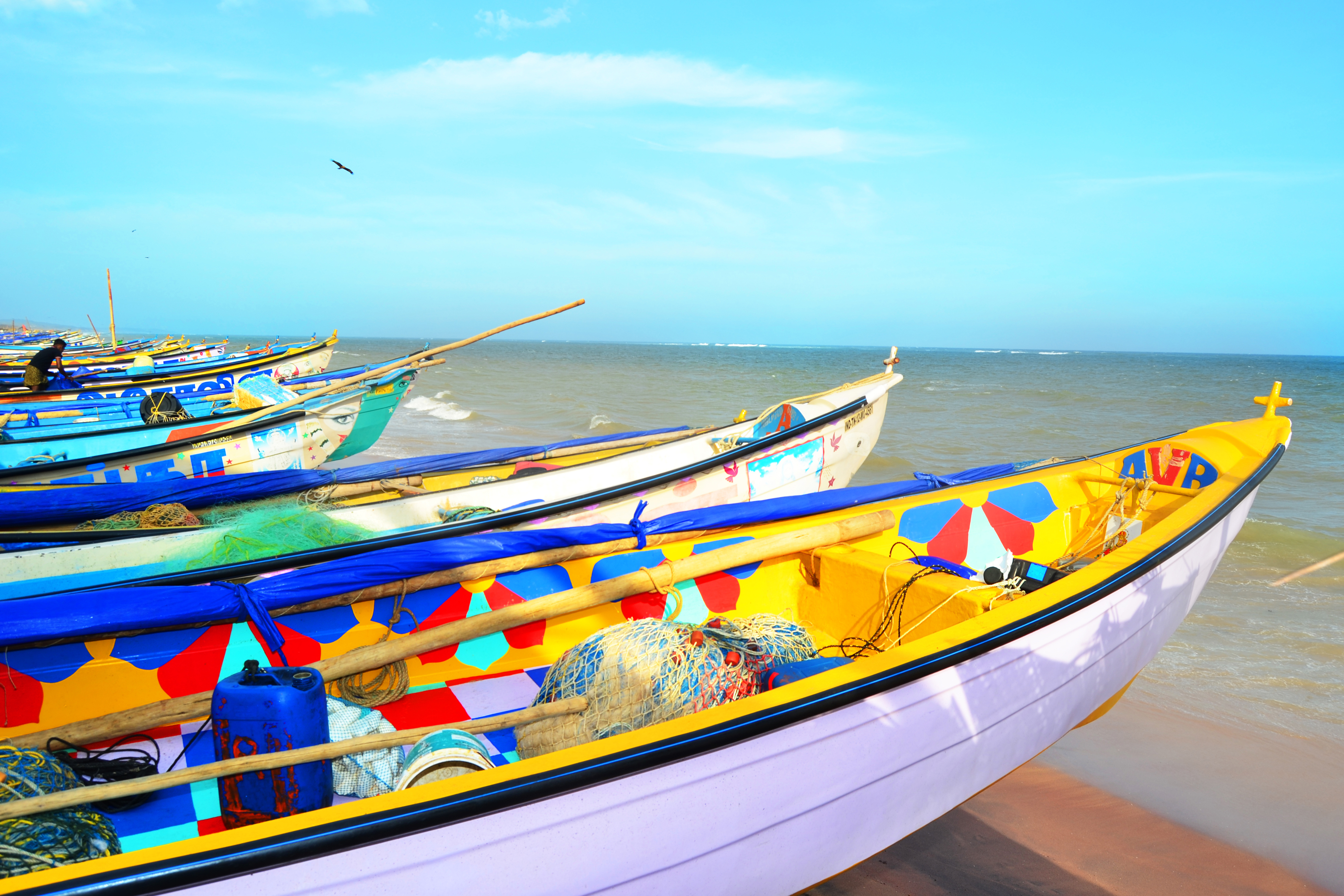
FISHING - BOATS AT THE SEA BEACH PERIYATHALAI

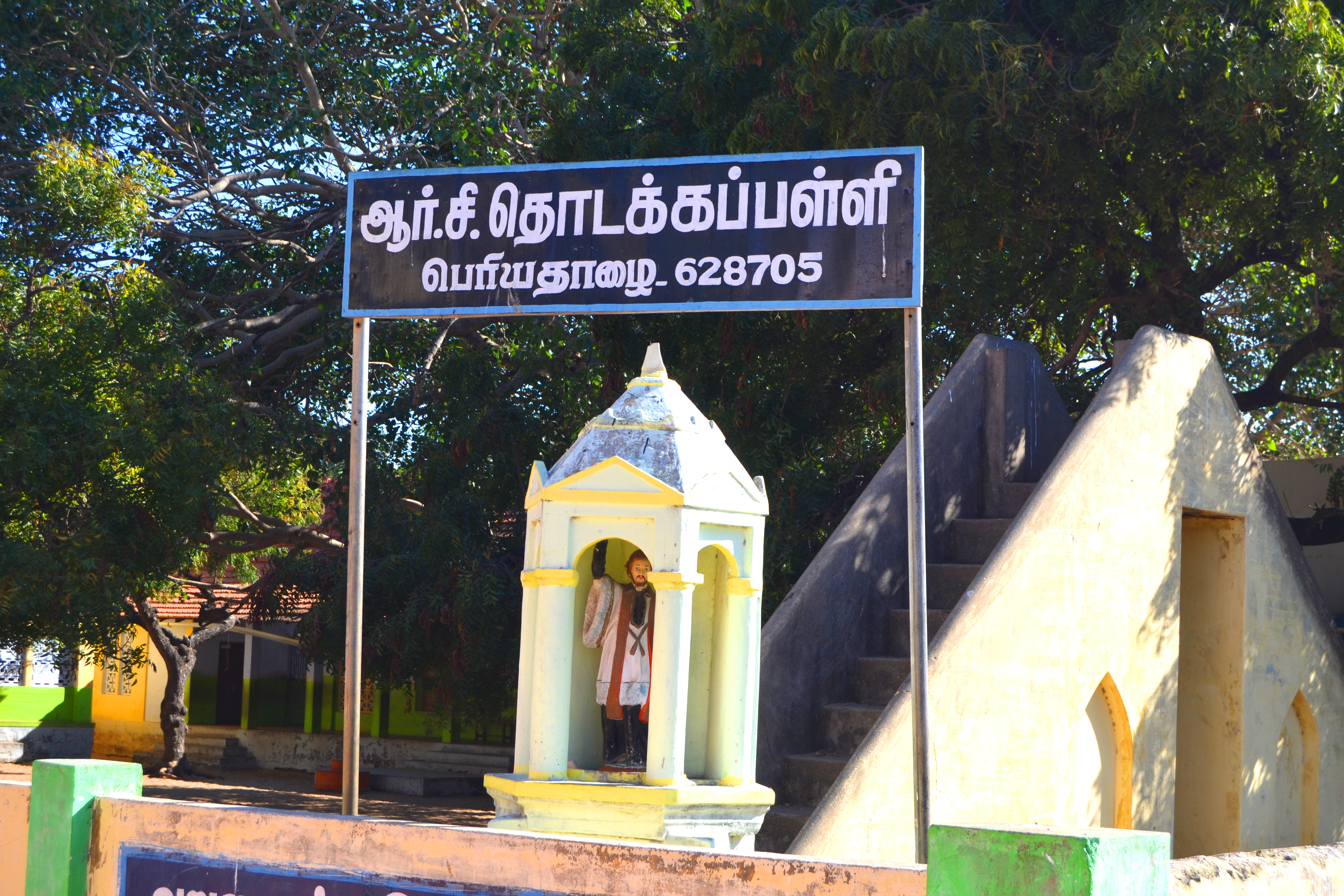
R.C.PRIMARY SCHOOL, PERIYATHALAI

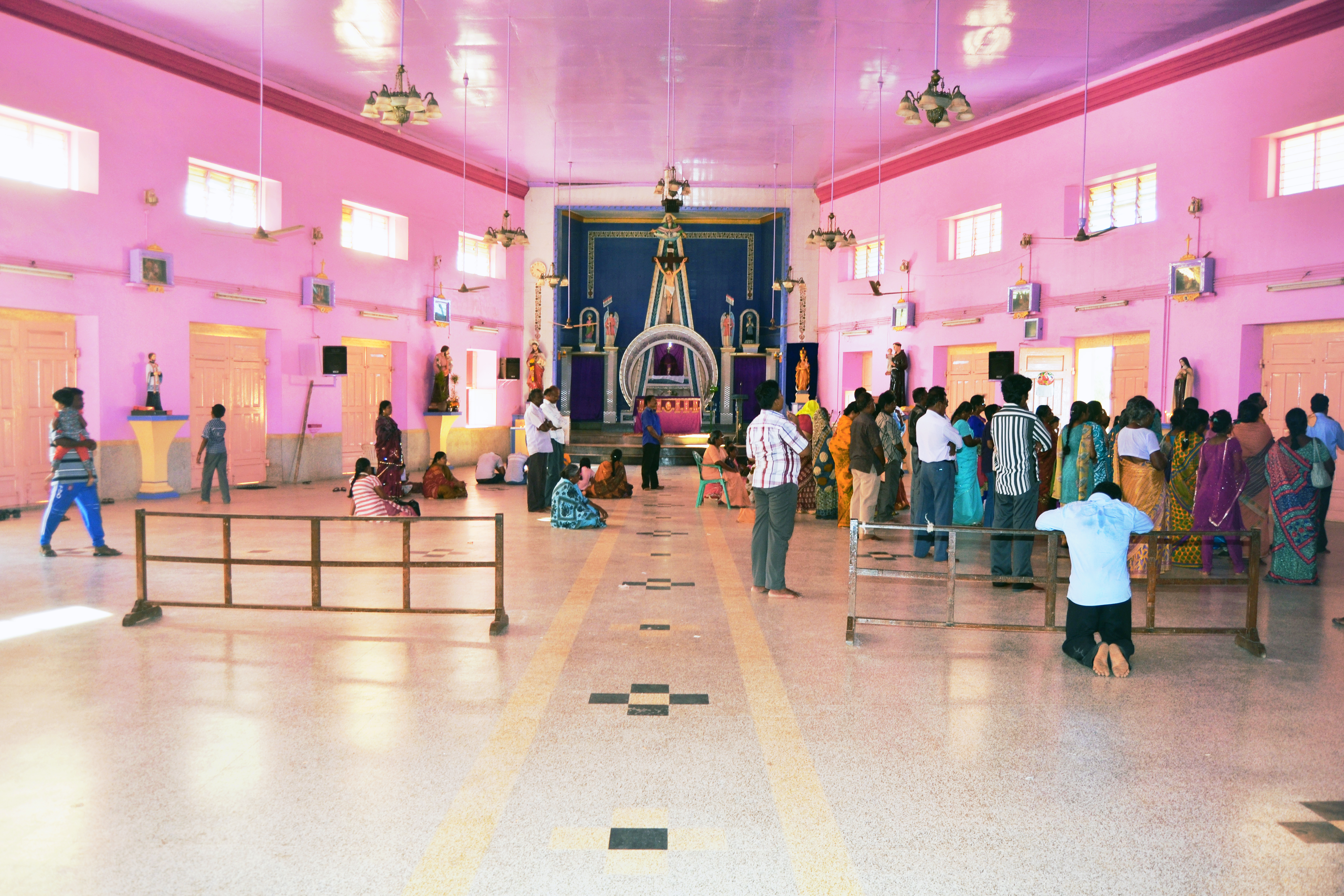
St.John and St.Stephens Church - PERIYATHALAI. INSIDE ALTAR VIEW,

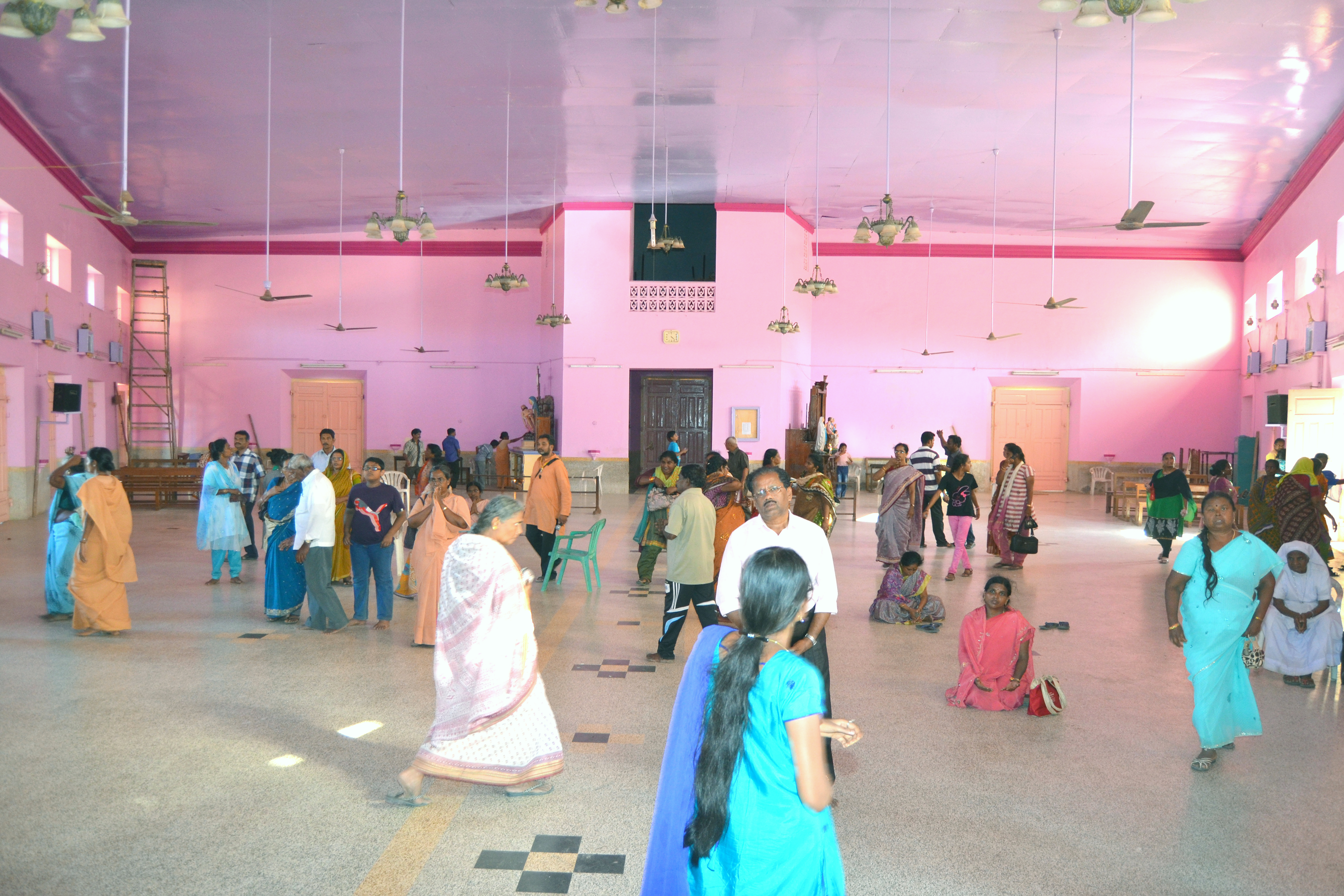
St.John and St.Stephens Church - PERIYATHALAI. INSIDE (MAIN ENTRANCE SIDE).

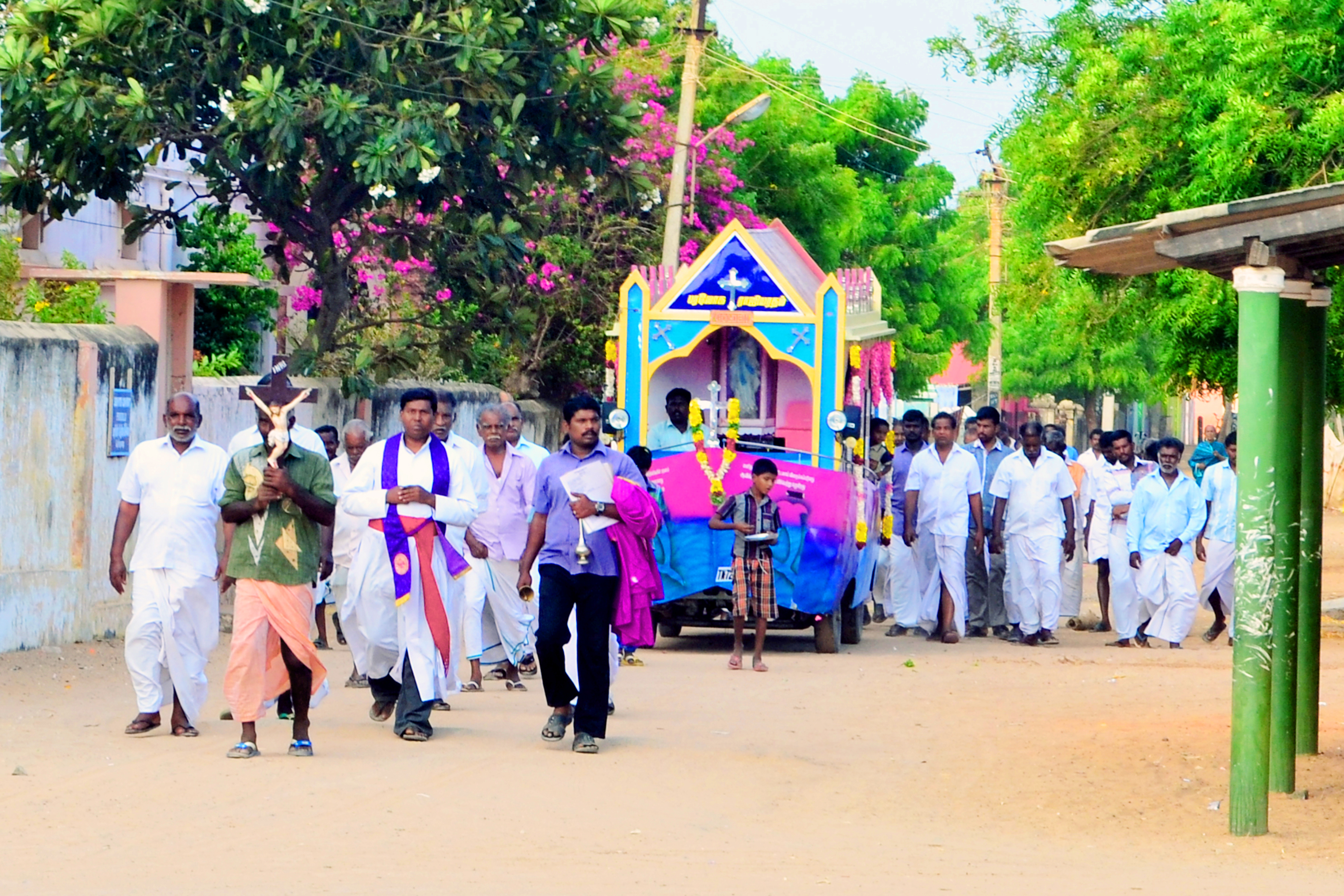
FUNERAL PROCESSION - PERIYATHALAI

== Brief history ==
During his ministry in the Pearl Fishery Coast, St. Xavier came to Periathalai several times. He was concerned about the welfare of the people of Periathalai; He taught them catechism and built a thatched church. Fr. Henri Antriquez who succeeded St. Xavier in the place of the old thatched church built a bigger church with clay and roofed that with palm leaves. This church had St. John as the patron saint. The Chiefton of Vijayapathi named Asiriya Perumal set fire to this church in 1597. But, it was rebuilt in 1603. Fr. John Pereira, a Jesuit Priest, who took charge of Periathalai as parish priest in 1635, laid foundation for a new church considering the growing population. For the new church which was completed in 1639, St. Stephen also was made as another patron saint. The ancient church began to deteriorate, People wanted to build a new church and Bishop Roche laid foundation for it. However, it took a long time before Fr. Dasan Dalmeida could actually start the work for the new church on 13 November 1963 . This triangular shaped church was consecrated and inaugurated for worship by Bishop Ambrose on the day of the Pentecost, that is on 14 May 1978 . The old church was totally destroyed and in that place is built a Wedding Hall.
