= Vendore =

- Village
- Location in Kerala, India Vendore (India)
- Coordinates: 10.4356541°N 76.27977149999992°E
- Country: India
- State: Kerala
- District: Thrissur District

Languages
  - Official: Malayalam, English
- Time zone: UTC+5:30 (IST)
- PIN: 680302
- Telephone code: 0480
- Temperature Range: 22.5°C - 35 °C

Vendore is a village in the Thrissur district of Kerala, India, between Amballur and Mannampetta. It comes under AlagappaNagar GramaPanchayat
