= Nazarene Soosai =

Most Reverend Nazarene Soosai
- Bishop of Kottar
- Church: Catholic Church
- Archdiocese: Madurai
- Diocese: Kottar
- Elected: 20 May 2017
- Predecessor: Peter Remigius
- Successor: Incumbent

Orders
- Ordination: 2 April 1989
- Consecration: 29 June 2017 by Peter Remigius

Personal details
- Born: 13 April 1963 Rajakkamangalam Thurai, Kanyakumari district, Tamil Nadu
- Denomination: Roman Catholic
- Residence: Bishop's House, Nagercoil
- Education: Pontifical Gregorian University; KU Leuven; Madurai Kamaraj University
- Motto: In the mind of Christ

Nazarene Soosai (born 13 April 1963) is a Roman Catholic Bishop who is currently serving as the Bishop of Kottar diocese. He is the sixth bishop of Kottar diocese.

== Early life ==
Nazarene Soosai was born to Soosi and Panipitchai as their 8th child on 13 April 1963, at Rajakkamangalam Thurai of Kanyakumari district in Tamil Nadu. He was baptized on 18 April 1963. He completed his studies from St. Aloysius Seminary Minor Seminary of Nagercoil, Sacred Heart Seminary in Poonamallee. He got a Licentiate in Theology from Catholic University of Leuven in Belgium, and a doctorate from the Pontifical Gregorian University in Rome. He acquired his Master’s Degree in Political Science from the University of Madurai.

== Academic and ecclesiastical career ==
After his priestly ordination on 2 April 1989, Nazarene Soosai was appointed as an assistant priest in Our Lady Of Presentation Church, Colachel. He then served as the prefect of studies at the Tamil Nadu Xavier Mission Home, Nagercoil and as well as the secretary of the Diocesan Commission for Vocations. In 1992, he served in the parish of St. Helen, Enayam. After that, he was appointed as the dean and professor of theology at the Sacred Heart Seminary, Poonamallee and remained in position for eight years. In 2011, he became the parish priest of Our Lady of Ransom Church, Kanyakumari.

He was also a visiting professor in Madras University, CRI Theological Institutes in Bangalore, Sambalpur, Odisha; Salesian Theological Institute in Chennai, St. Paul’s seminary in Tiruchirapalli and Arul Kadal, Chennai.

On 20 May 2017, Pope Francis appointed him as the Bishop of Kottar diocese and he was consecrated on 29 June 2017, by his predecessor Rev. Peter Remigius, Archbishop Antony Pappusamy and Bishop Eugene Joseph.
