= Rajakkamangalam Thurai =

Coordinates: 8°06′57″N 77°22′25″E

Rajakkamangalam Thurai is a village in Kanyakumari district, Tamil Nadu state in South India, on the Arabian Sea.

The village is 10 km from the district capital, Nagercoil. It is the main village in the Rajakkamangalam Grama panchayat.

== Etymology ==
Rajakkamangalam thurai is named after a pathway in the village that was used by local rulers to travel between Travancore and the Vaddakottai Palace. The village came to be called Rajakkal-Mangalam. Later it became Rajakkamangalam. When the Kanyakumari District joined Tamil Nadu, the village became Rajakkamangalam Thurai. The word "Thurai" refers to a coastal village.

== History ==
From 1758 to 1798, Rajakkamangalam thurai was part of the Travancore empire ruled by Karthika Thirunal Rama Varma . Rama varma had three children. Afraid that they would be future rivals, he ordered their murders. However, the person tasked with this deed instead hid them in Rajakkamangalam thurai. (written by raja akl)

As the three boys grew up, they plotted to kill their father. In 1795, Rama varma learned of this plot and traveled to Rajakkamangalam thurai to kill them. The boys fled to Melathurai, but Rama varma followed them there and murdered them in the coconut forest called pillaithopu (raja akl)

== Parish Church ==
There were Christians (only Paravar community peoples are living) in the village even before St. Francis Xavier arrived there.

There were about 640 Catholics in 1616 and 584 in 1716. In the late 1704 or the beginning of 1705, the Jesuit Provincial House at Tope (pillai tope) was destroyed. The provincial who, then, shifted the House to Colachel feeling its inadequacy, Then only Paravar community peoples are migrated to Rajakkamangalam. There was already a well-built church at Rajakkamangalam Thurai, believed to have been put up in 1570. A Jesuit priest was probably residing at Rajakkamangalam Thurai in 1773. This period (1570) only nine villages are under the Jesuit priest including Rajakkamangalam thurai.

'Our Lady of Good Health' was so profound that the elders carried huge stones and other materials on their shoulders from miles away to extend the small church about 150 years ago. Hence it was first extended in 1852.

The foundation stone for the present church was laid by Rt. Rev. Bishop T. Roach Agniswamy S.J on 20 March 1955. It took about 20 years to complete the whole construction work. 1570 and Rev. Fr. A Selvaraj were instrumental in this effort . On 8 September 1976, the new church was blessed and dedicated to 'Our Lady of Good Health' by Rt. Rev. Bishop Marianus Arockiasamy. The church tower is one of the tallest towers in South India.

The present Periyakadu parish was a substation of Rajakkamangalam Thurai. Karavilai, is another substation of Rajakkamangalam Thurai, was initiated by Fr. Eugene Kulandai in 1964. The church in Karavilai was blessed by Rt. Rev. Bishop Marianus Arockiasamy in 1975.

== Summit of Paravas ==
Only Paravar community (they known as Bharavar, Bharathar, Bharathavar, Bharathakula Pandyar and Rajakula Bharathavar community) people in Rajakkamangalam Thurai. This village is one of the biggest village in Paravar communities. T

About 60 years ago, the whole Paravar community, from the East, Vippar to the West, Kannoor called for the 7th Summit of all Paravars. Thousands of people belonging to the Paravar Community participated in this summit. The entire expenses of this summit were borne by the people of Rajakkamangalam Thurai.

== Education ==
There is one High school (St.Joseph's high school), Branch of Indian overseas Bank and Government Hospital are there. Also, two Convents are there.(St.Annal Convent and DMI Convent).

== Notable people ==
- Bishop Eugene Joseph
- Bishop Nazarene Soosai
- Fr J.E. Arul Raj
