= Vembar =

Neighbourhood in Thoothukudi district, Tamil Nadu, India

- village
- Vembar, Tamil Nadu
- Coordinates: 9.078800°N 78.362900°E
- Country: India
- State: Tamil Nadu
- District: Thoothukudi

Government
  - Body: Panchayat
- Elevation: 31 m (102 ft)

Languages
  - Official: Tamil
- Time zone: UTC+5:30 (IST)
- PIN: 628906
- Telephone code: 04638

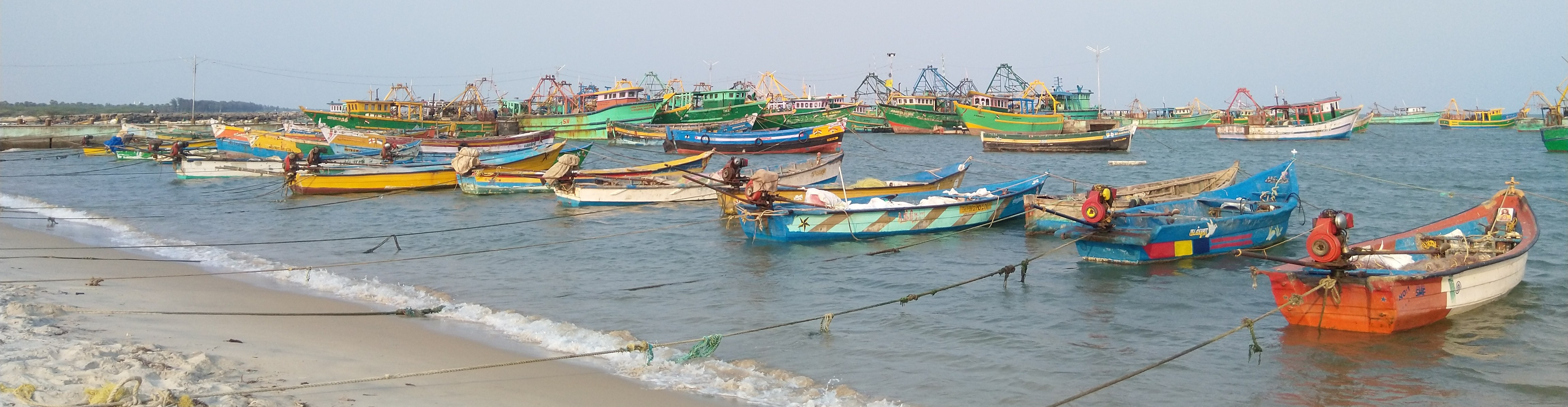
Fishing harbour, coastal Village in Tamil Nadu

Vembar is a village panchayat in Thoothukudi district in the Indian state of Tamil Nadu. Situated along the East Coast Road at the north end of the district, Vembar has two panchayats - Vembar South and Vembar North.

Vembar is located near the district's border with Ramanathapuram District, about 13 km south of Sayalkudi and around 7 km from Melmandai. Madurai is 97 km north-west while Tirunelveli is 85 km west. Other nearby towns are Vilathikulam (22 km) and Tuticorin (45 km).

Panchalankurichi, Ettayapuram, Gulf of Mannar Marine Biosphere Reserve, Kurusadai Islands, Pamban Bridge and Dhanushkodi are close to Vembar and the nearest airport is at Tuticorin. Ramanathapuram Railway Station, Kovilpatti and Tuticorin Railway Station serve Vembar.

The main source of income here is fishing and Palmyra tree climbing. Palm sugar is one of the popular foods of Vembar.

A lighthouse is located at Vembar beach.

== History ==
During 1542 when Jesuit Priest Francis Xavier travelled through these coastal regions he asked people to build churches. Churches were built with walls made of clay and roofs made of thatched leaves. More than 40 churches were built in this way along the coastal regions and Vembar was one among them. During 1600 Jesuit records in Rome noted that Vembar's church was the biggest and beautiful among the coastal churches built during that time.

Around 1658 Dutch explorers overtook these coastal regions from Portuguese. The Dutch who followed "Calvinism" started damaging Catholic churches in Vembar, Manappad, Virapandianpatanam, Tuticorin and Punnaikayal. These churches started functioning as the warehouses for the weapons possessed by the Dutch. Eventually the Paravars did not support the Dutch in their business and the Dutch faced heavy losses. In 1699 the Dutch called up all Paravars along the coast line and asked them to follow Catholicism without any fear. In fact the Dutch were instrumental in starting some churches for us and many of them turned to Catholicism. After 50 years since the Dutch came the church in Vembar started functioning again as a parish. In 1708 Vembar and Vaipar was a single parish. During the 1720s a second church was built and was named The Holy Spirit Church.

History records that in 1709 a terrible plague affected the people of Vembar. This plague took many lives and incapacitated many in this village which lasted for nearly 2 years. During this time people turned towards Saint Sebastian, a warrior saint from Milan, Italy. He is known for curing plagues all over the world. The people of Vembar prayed vigorously to Saint Sebastian and many were cured by these prayers. Around 1711 – 1712 the people embraced St. Sebastian as the patron saint of Vembar. For more information on St. Sebastian please read the article "Vembar & St. Sebastian".

The second church built during the 1720s started deteriorating in the beginning of the 20th century. The construction of a new church began in 1908 and the stones and woods from the old church were used for this building. Paravars belonging to Vembar (within Vembar and outside of Vembar) contributed heavily to build this new church. Finally on 1 February 1915 the new church was blessed and dedicated to The Holy Spirit by Parish priest Fr. Swaminathar in the presence of Tiruchi Bishop Rev. Augustine Faisandier

Since 1876 Vembar had been a big mission with 25 substations; but from 1908 substations of Vembar were annexed with Tuticorin one after another. The church has a statue of Auxilium Mary (In Tamil known as "Sengol Matha") in the centre near the Eucharistic Tabernacle. The feast for Sengol Matha is observed on 30 October. On the left and right side of the Tabernacle are the statues of St. Joseph and St. Sebastian. St. Sebastian's relic was brought from Rome to Vembar and this relic is used for blessing during St. Sebastian's feast. After the few years vembar holy ghost parish has divided into two parishes. Another one is St. Peter's parish.

== Places of interest ==
- Deva Sabai - God's Church (East Coast Road)

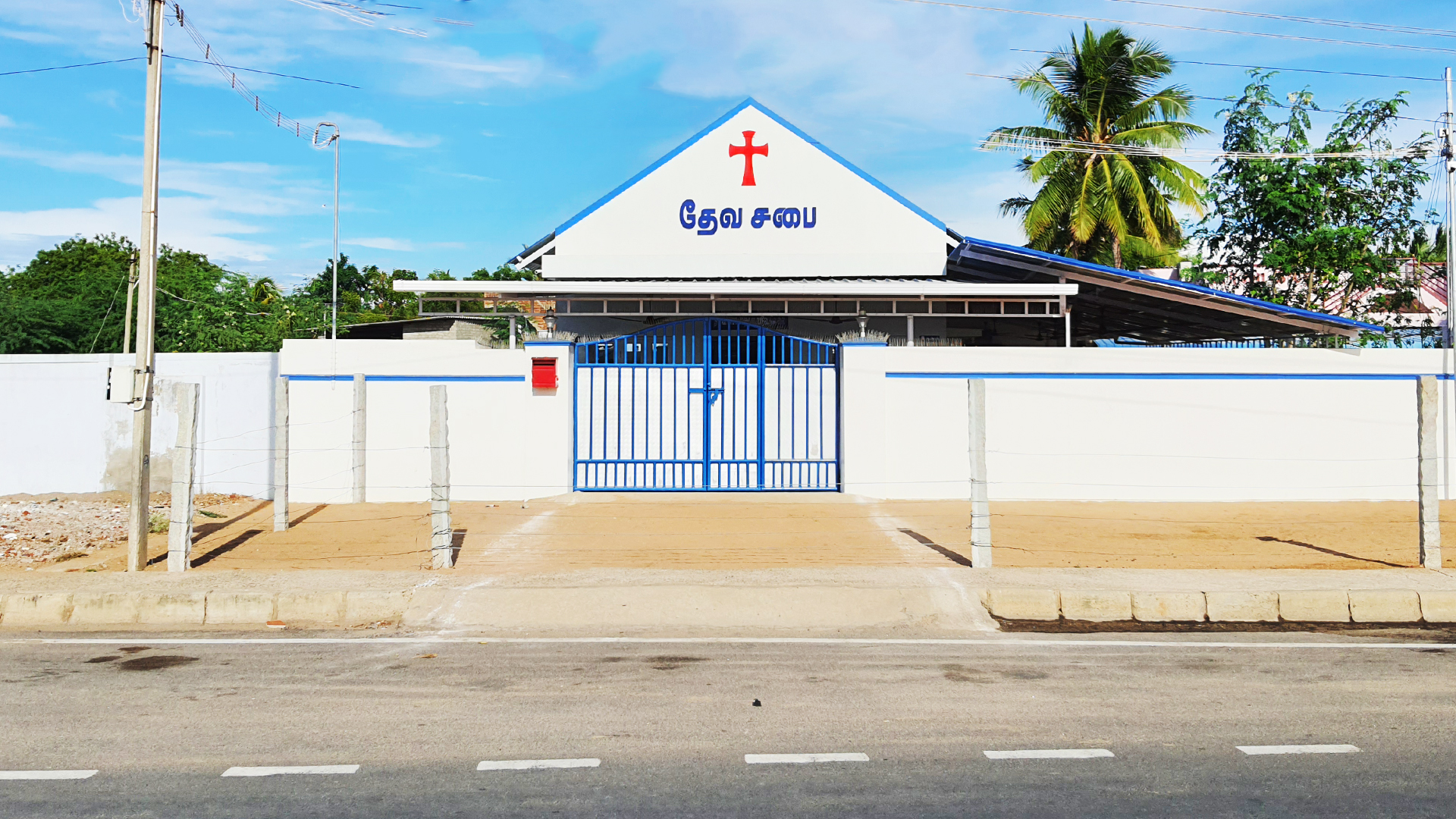
Deva Sabai - God's Church Vembar in 2022

Jesus – The Shelter (Deva Sabai) was founded by Pastor M. Xavier in Vembar on 10 December 1988. Numerous people have been blessed by this ministry.

- The Holy Ghost Church was built in 1915. It is one of the oldest churches on the Coramandel coastline. Every year during the month of January more than 10,000 Catholic devotees gather from all around the world to celebrate the feast. The church has been well maintained for more than one hundred years by the Paravar community who are the original native fishermen and inhabitants of the land for more than 500 years.
- St. Antony's Church (South): It is visited by numerous devotees during the feast in September.
- St.Thomas church (South)
- Holy Ghost Church (North)
- St.Sebastian's Grotto (North)
- St. Antony Church (North)
- Veeriya Perumal Iyyanar Temple: The deity of this Hindu temple is Veeriya Perumal Iyannar. The date of construction of this old temple is unknown. Legend has it that Iyyanar guards the Vembar village and is very powerful. Another goddess, Karuppasamy is the captain for Iyyanar to guard the people. The temple does not have any building or fencing in keeping with local belief. More than 15,000 people gather every year across the world to worship Iyyanar. Horse and elephant figures are assembled at the Iyyanar temple. The festival lasts for 3 days. On the first day, devotees offer worship at the Pathrakaali Amman Kovil, which is located 700 meters away from the Iyyanar temple. On the second day, worship is done at the Iyyanar temple. On the third day, at the Veeriya Karriamman Kovil, which is located 900 meters away from the Iyyanar temple. The third day of the festival is celebrated with sugarcane and turmeric. This temple is managed and administrated by Nadar community of people from Tamil Nadu.
- Veeriya Karriamman Kovil
- CSI Church
- Iyyanar Kovil
