= Diocese of Varanasi =

Roman Catholic diocese in Uttar Pradesh, India

Coordinates: 25.3312°N 82.9842°E

Diocese of Varanasi Dioecesis Varanasiensis वाराणसी के सूबा
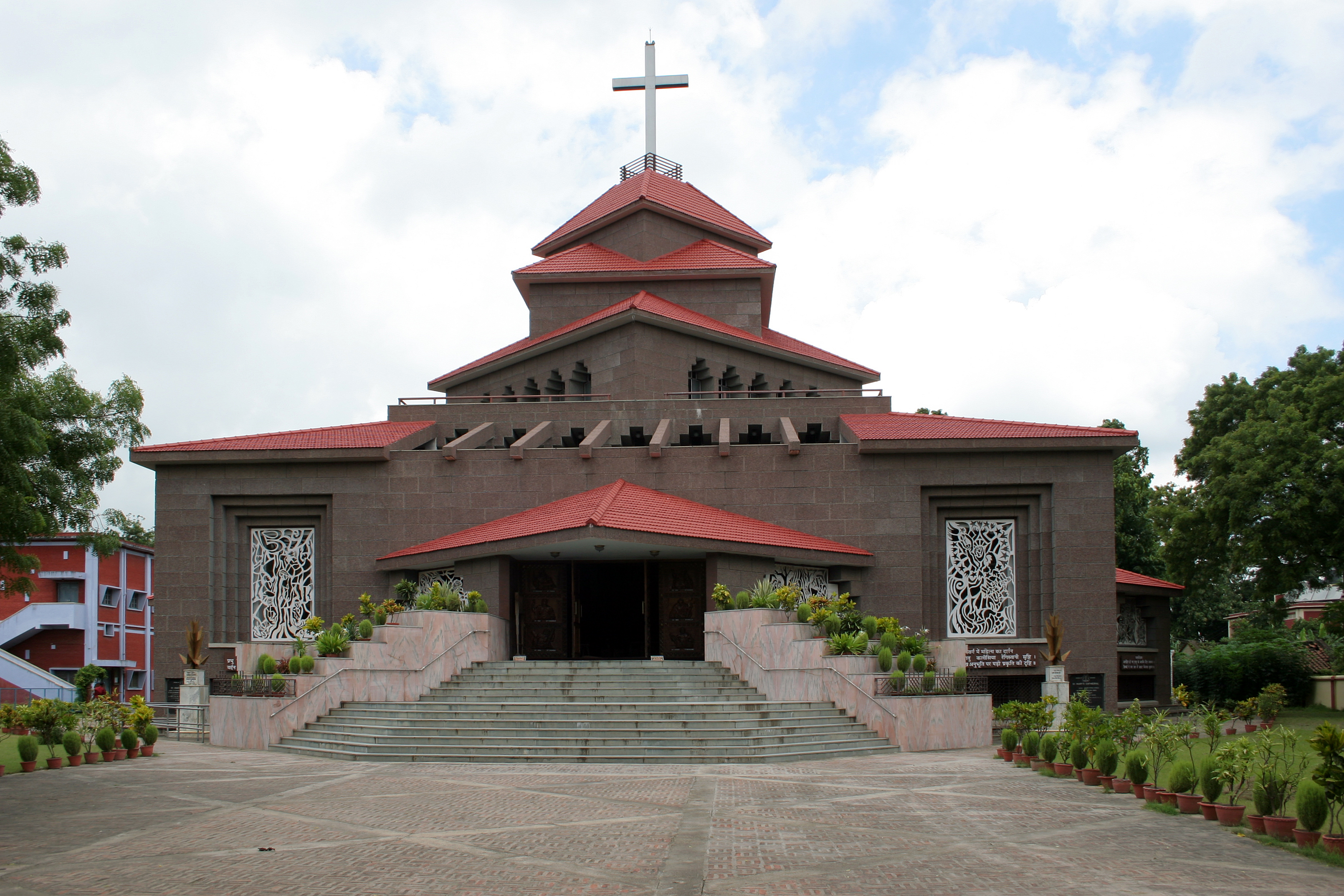
- St. Mary's Cathedral, Varanasi

Location
- Country: India
- Ecclesiastical province: Agra
- Metropolitan: Agra

Statistics
- Area: 25,173 km^{2} (9,719 sq mi)
- Population: Total; Catholics: (as of 2022); 25381937; 21132 (0.1%)
- Parishes: 45

Information
- Rite: Latin Rite
- Cathedral: St. Mary's Cathedral, Varanasi
- Patron saint: John the Baptist, Fidelis of Sigmaringen
- Secular priests: 157

Current leadership
- Pope: Leo XIV
- Bishop: Eugene Joseph
- Metropolitan Archbishop: Raphy Manjaly

Map
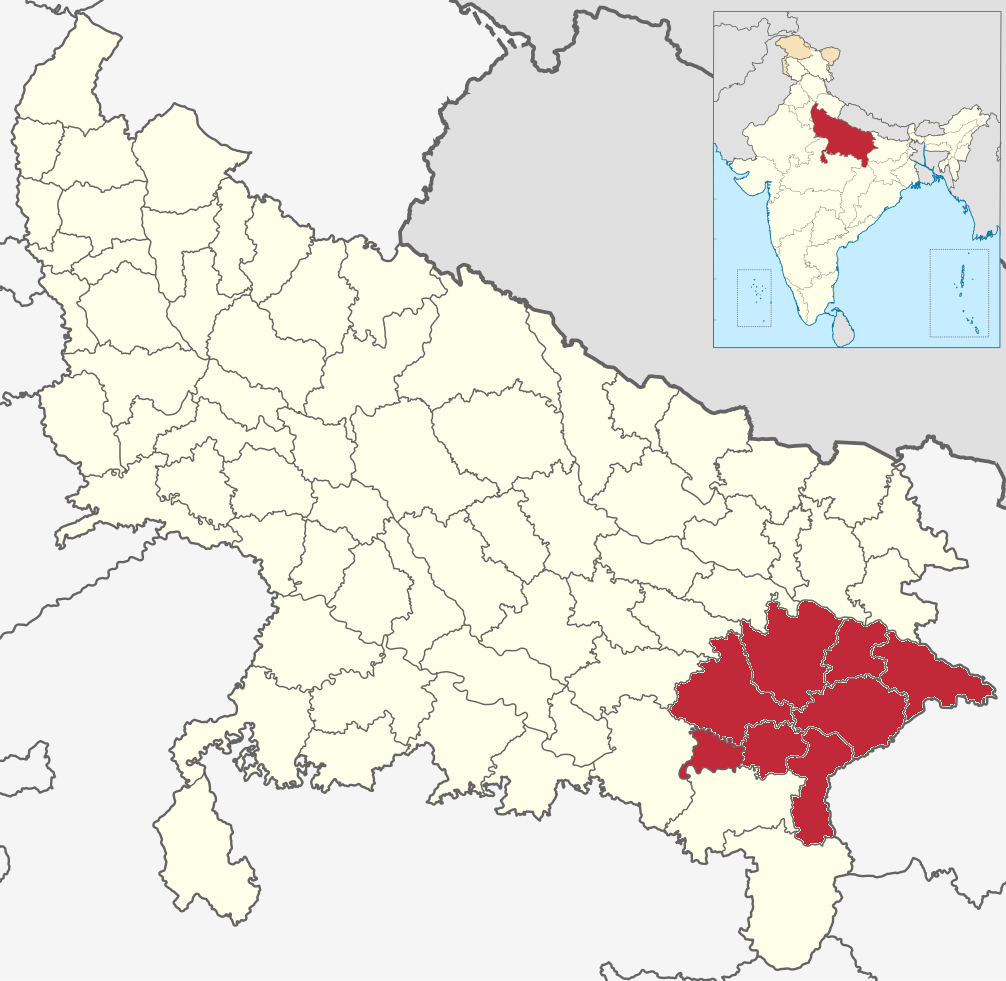

Website
- diovns.com

The Roman Catholic Diocese of Varanasi (Latin: Dioecesis Varanasiensis) is a Latin Church suffragan diocese in the ecclesiastical province of the Archdiocese of Agra in northern India's state of Uttar Pradesh. Its episcopal see is St. Mary's Cathedral in the cantonment area of Varanasi.

== History ==
The Catholic presence in eastern Uttar Pradesh was initially administered under the Diocese of Allahabad. In the 1940s, Canadian missionaries of the Order of Friars Minor Capuchin (OFM Cap.) were entrusted with the regional apostolate.

Key milestones in the diocese's creation and elevation include:

- 11 July 1946: Established as the Apostolic Prefecture of Gorakhpur by Pope Pius XII, split from the Diocese of Allahabad and directly subject to the Holy See.
- 17 September 1958: Renamed the Apostolic Prefecture of Benares-Gorakhpur.
- 5 June 1970: Promoted to a diocese as the Diocese of Banaras by Pope Paul VI, becoming a suffragan of the Metropolitan Archdiocese of Agra.
- 14 May 1971: Formally renamed the Diocese of Varanasi to reflect the official designation of the city.

== Territory and Organization ==
The diocese covers an area of approximately 25,173 square kilometres (9,719 sq mi) across eight civil districts in eastern Uttar Pradesh: Varanasi, Chandauli, Ghazipur, Jaunpur, Ballia, Mau, Azamgarh, and Bhadohi.

Pastoral care across its 45 parishes is coordinated through three primary deaneries:

- Varanasi Deanery
- Ghazipur Deanery
- Ballia Deanery

== Institutions and Apostolates ==
The diocese operates numerous educational institutions, health centres, and socio-pastoral apostolates:

- Social Development: The Varanasi Catholic Diocese Social Service Society (VCDSSS) serves as the official developmental and humanitarian arm of the diocese, carrying out community empowerment, health, and rural education programs.
- Pastoral Training: The Nav Sadhana Regional Pastoral Centre in Shivpur promotes liturgical animation, catechist training, and inter-religious dialogue.
- Healthcare: Healthcare services are provided through institutions including St. Mary's Hospital and rural dispensaries managed by religious congregations serving within the diocese.

== Ordinaries ==
=== Apostolic Prefects ===
Apostolic Prefects of Gorakhpur

- Father Joseph Emil Malenfant, OFM Cap. (6 June 1947 – 17 September 1958)

Apostolic Prefects of Benares-Gorakhpur

- Father Joseph Emil Malenfant, OFM Cap. (17 September 1958 – 1970)

=== Bishops ===
Bishops of Banaras

- Patrick Paul D'Souza (5 June 1970 – 14 May 1971)

Bishops of Varanasi

- Patrick Paul D'Souza (14 May 1971 – 24 February 2007)
- Raphy Manjaly (24 February 2007 – 17 October 2013; later appointed Bishop of Allahabad, and subsequently Metropolitan Archbishop of Agra in 2020)
- Eugene Joseph (appointed 30 May 2015; consecrated 24 August 2015)
