= Rajakkamangalam =

- Location in Tamil Nadu, India
- Coordinates: 8.130821°N 77.369907°E
- Country: India
- State: Tamil Nadu
- District: Kanniyakumari

Population (2001)
  - Total: 8,978

Languages
  - Official: Tamil
- Time zone: UTC+5:30 (IST)
- PIN: 629 503

Rajakkamangalam is a block or Panchayat Union of Kanyakumari district, India. It is one of the nine administrative divisions of the district of Kanyakumari. The current president of the Rajakkamangalam Panchayat is R.Ayyappan. It includes the following 15 village panchayats,

1. Athikkattuvilai
2. Elluvilai
3. Ganapathipuram
4. Kanyakulam
5. Kesavanputhenthurai
6. Melekrishnanputhoor
7. Manakudi
8. Northsoorankudy
9. Putheri
10. Peruvilai
11. Parakkai
12. Pallamthurai
13. Melasankarankuzhi
14. Pannaiyoor
15. Rajakkamangalam Thurai
16. Dharmapuram
17. Azhathangarai

Research Centre: Centre for Marine Science and Technology is the research centre of Manonmaniam Sundaranar University for coastal aquaculture and marine biotechnology research activities. The centre is recognized by DST-FIST, UGC-SAP, DRS by the Government of India. The centre is one of the very few institutes in India offering M.Sc., M.Phil and Ph.D in marine biotechnology. The centre is the offshoot of Madurai Kamaraj University, and later it was formed as the Institute of Artemia Research and Training inaugurated by Dr. J. Jayalalitha during early 1990s and later renamed as the Institute of Coastal Area Studies, and now is called the Centre for Marine Science and Technology with advance research activities in the areas of marine microbiology, nanobiotechnology, marine pharmacology, marine biodiversity, micro-algal technology, molecular biology, etc.

The Rajakkamangalam estuary and Azhathangarai marsh land contains a coastal ecosystem with a mangroves habitat, sand dunes and sea turtle breeding site near Azhathangarai beach. The Rajakkamangalam estuary and Azhathangarai marsh land is considered one of the breeding and feeding grounds for many birds like painted stork, cormorant, spot billed pelicans, purple swamphen, dabchick, garganey, purple heron, open bill stork, black winged stilt, etc.
