= Alagappa Nagar =

- town
- Location in Kerala, India
- Coordinates: 10°26′N 76°16′E
- Country: India
- State: Kerala
- District: Thrissur

Languages
  - Official: Malayalam, English
- Time zone: UTC+5:30 (IST)
- Vehicle registration: KL-

Alagappa Nagar is in Mukundapuram Taluk in Thrissur District in Kerala State.
