= Saint Paul's College, Goa =

Defunct Jesuit school in Portuguese Goa

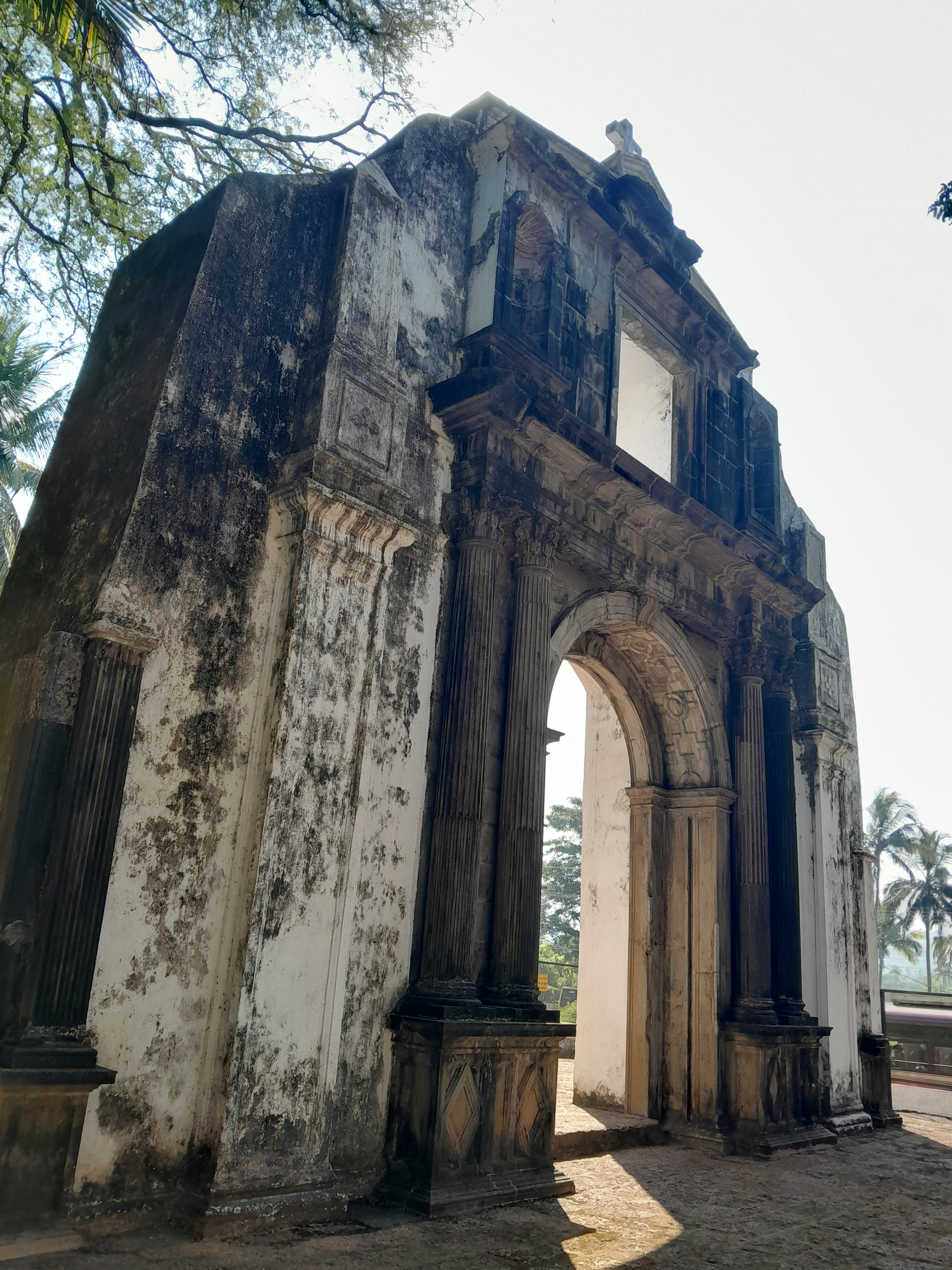
Gate of St. Paul's College (only vestige)

St. Paul's College was a Jesuit school, and later college, founded circa 1542 by Saint Francis Xavier, at Velha Goa. It was once the main Jesuit institution in the whole of Asia. It housed the first printing press in India, having published the first books in 1556. The original building, however, was abandoned progressively after the outbreak of plague in 1578, and went into disuse as the college moved to new building known as the New College of Saint Paul. It is an ASI protected Monument of National Importance in Goa.

The ruins were demolished in 1832. The only vestige of the original college and of the collegiate church consecrated on 25 January 1543 is the Gate of the College of St. Paul, that can be seen south of St. Cajetan's church. The arch with a niche at the top and a cross crowning it, is built of laterite and flanked by basalt columns. The legacy of St. Paul's College endures until today in the Rachol Seminary.

== History ==
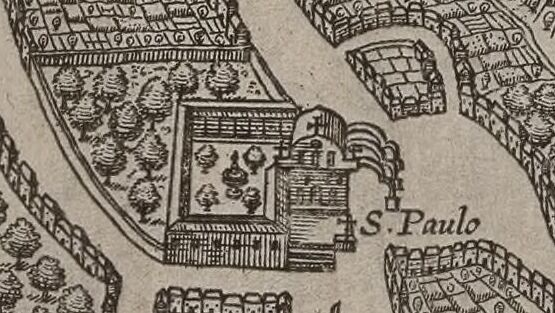
Colégio de São Paulo (St. Paul's College) on the map A ilha e cidade de Goa Metropolitana da India... by Jan Huyghen van Linschoten

In 1542 the first Jesuits arrived at India headed by Francis Xavier, co-founder of the new Society of Jesus. They were sent by King John III of Portugal to help on religious issues in the Portuguese Empire, under the Padroado agreement. In Goa, then capital of Portuguese India they established, at first temporarily, in the Seminary of the Holy Faith (Santa Fé) started by Miguel Vaz and Franciscan friar Diogo de Borba, under the patronage of governor Estevão da Gama in 1541. Soon they renamed it "St. Paul's College" as it became the Jesuit' headquarters in Asia. The college had classes in grammar, rhetoric, and lectures on classical authors. It had also a school for 450 local students, teaching reading and writing, and an hospital. On 10 March 1554 the college got a grant from king John III of Portugal entitling it to the rents of the temples in Goa and nearby islands. It was also entitled to the gifts from local chiefs to the king.

The French traveler François Pyrard de Laval, who visited Goa c.1608, described the College of St Paul, praising the variety of the subjects taught there free of charge. Like many other European travelers who visited the College, he recorded that at this time it had 3000 students, from all the missions of Asia. Its Library was one of the biggest in Asia, and the first Printing Press was mounted there.

== The first printing press ==
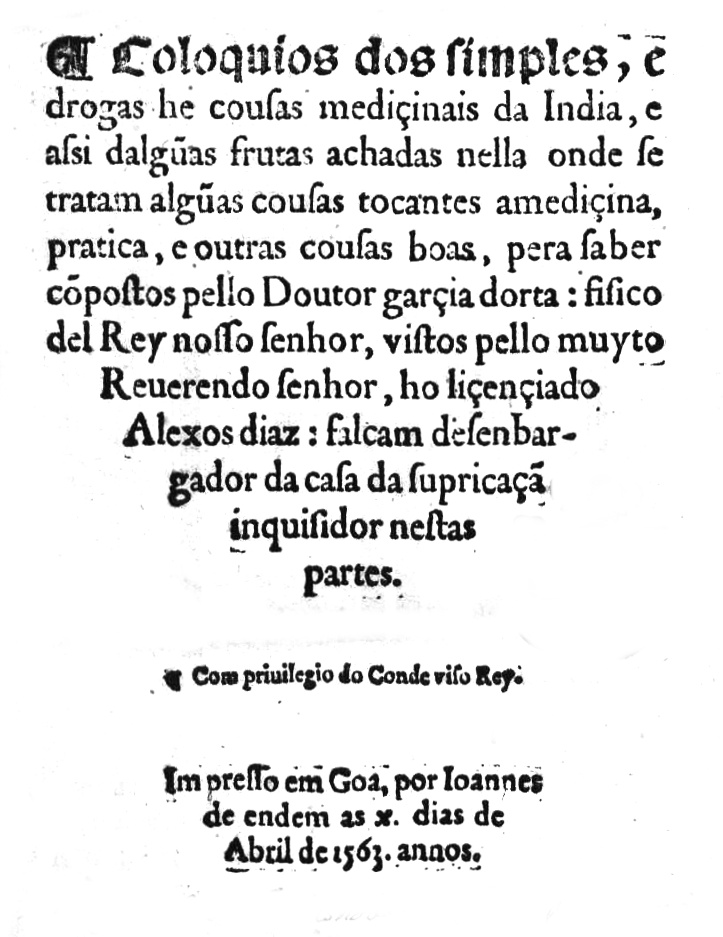
Title page of Garcia da Orta's Colóquios. Goa, 1563.

The art of printing first entered India through St. Paul's College in Goa. In a letter to St. Ignatius of Loyola, dated 30 April 1556, Father Gasper Caleza speaks of a ship carrying a printing press, setting sail from Portugal to Abyssinia (current-day Ethiopia) via Goa, with the purpose of helping missionary work. Circumstances prevented this printing press from leaving India, and consequently, printing operations began in Goa in 1556, established at the Jesuit College of St Paul in Old Goa.

That year, D. João Nunes Barreto, who had been appointed Patriarch of Abyssinia, and his coadjutor Belchior Leitão stood residing in Goa, offering his episcopal services till the appointment of the first Archbishop of Goa, D. Gaspar de Leão Pereira in 1560. He introduced the printing press to Goa. The individual responsible for the initiation of printing in India was João de Bustamante. Bustamante, an expert printer sent accompanying the printing press, along with his Indian assistant set up the new press and began to operate it. Among others, four books are known to have been printed by Bustamante: The first book published that year was called Conclusiones Philosophicas. A year later, the printing press published its second book, Catecismo da Doutrina Christã, five years after the death of its author, St. Francis Xavier. This was followed by the printing of Garcia da Orta’s Colóquios dos simples e drogas he cousas medicinais da Índia on 10 April 1563 by João de Endem. In 1568, the first illustrated cover page (the illustration being done with the relief technique of woodblock) was printed in Goa for the book Constituciones do Arcebispado de Goa. The earliest, surviving printed book in India is the Compendio Spiritual da Vide Christaa (Spiritual Compendium of the Christian life) of Gaspar Jorge de Leão Pereira, the Portuguese Archbishop of Goa.

== Notable alumni ==
- Blessed Miguel de Carvalho (1579–1624), Jesuit priest, and Martyr of Japan
- Saint Joseph Vaz (1651–1711), Oratorian priest and 'Apostle of Ceylon'.

== See also ==
- Printing in Goa
- Printing in Tamil language
- Francis Xavier
- Henrique Henriques
- St. Paul's College, Macao
- List of Jesuit sites
