= Lingua Malabar Tamul =

Variant of Tamil language

Lingua Malabar Tamul or simply Malabar Tamil is a variant of the Tamil language promoted by European Missionaries in southern parts of Kerala state like Kollam and Thiruvananthapuram districts before they started promoting Malayalam language among newly converted Christians. Malabar Tamil differs significantly from standard Tamil in its selection of vocabulary. Initially Malabar Tamil was printed using Roman script. Later on, printing using Tamil script became widespread.

== Etymology ==
The word Malabar is derived from the words "mala-bar". Malai in Tamil means "hill". Bar in Persian/Arabic means "country" or "nation".

== Gallery ==
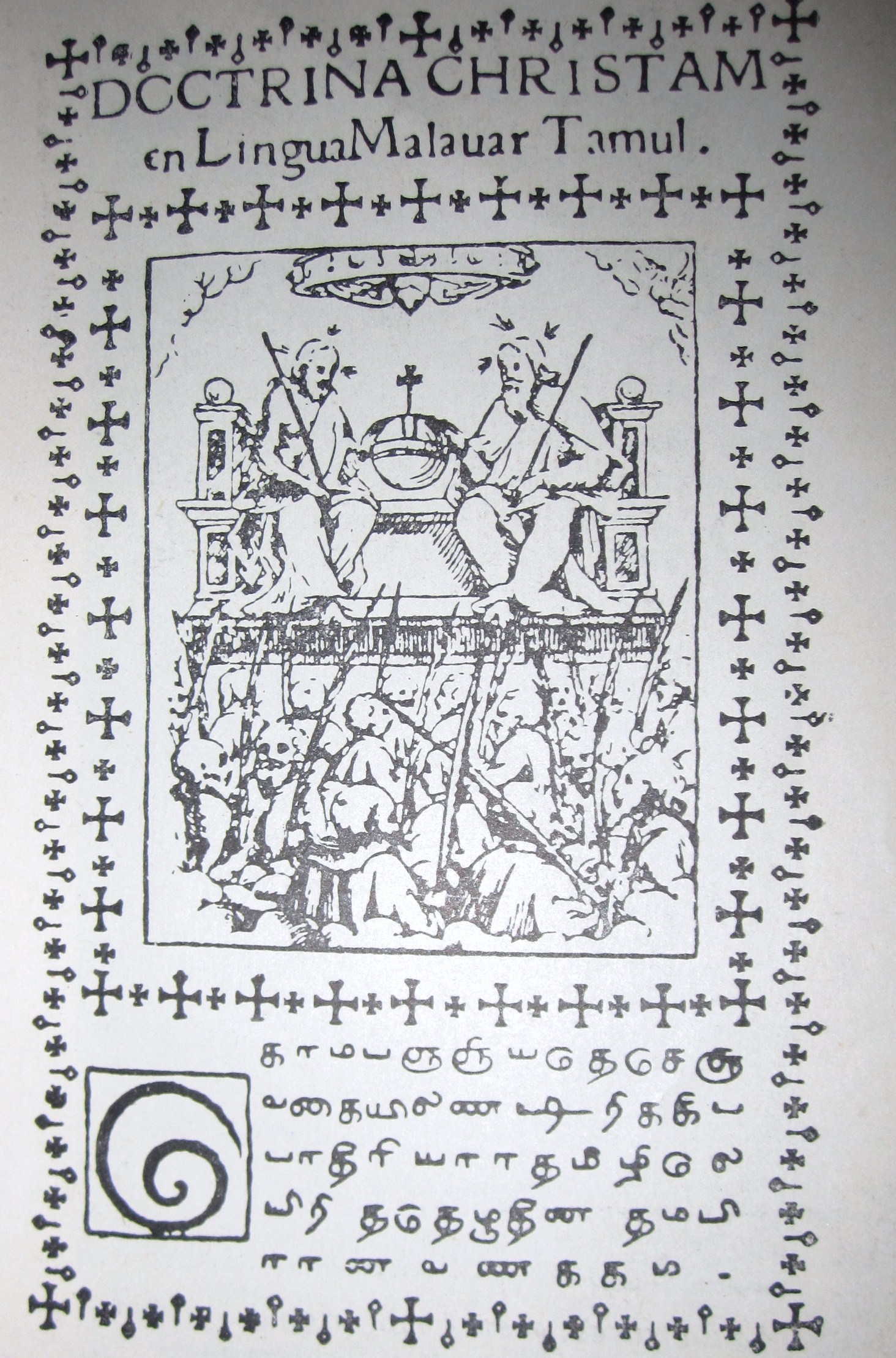
Doctrina Christam/Thambiran vanakkam (printed in 1578)

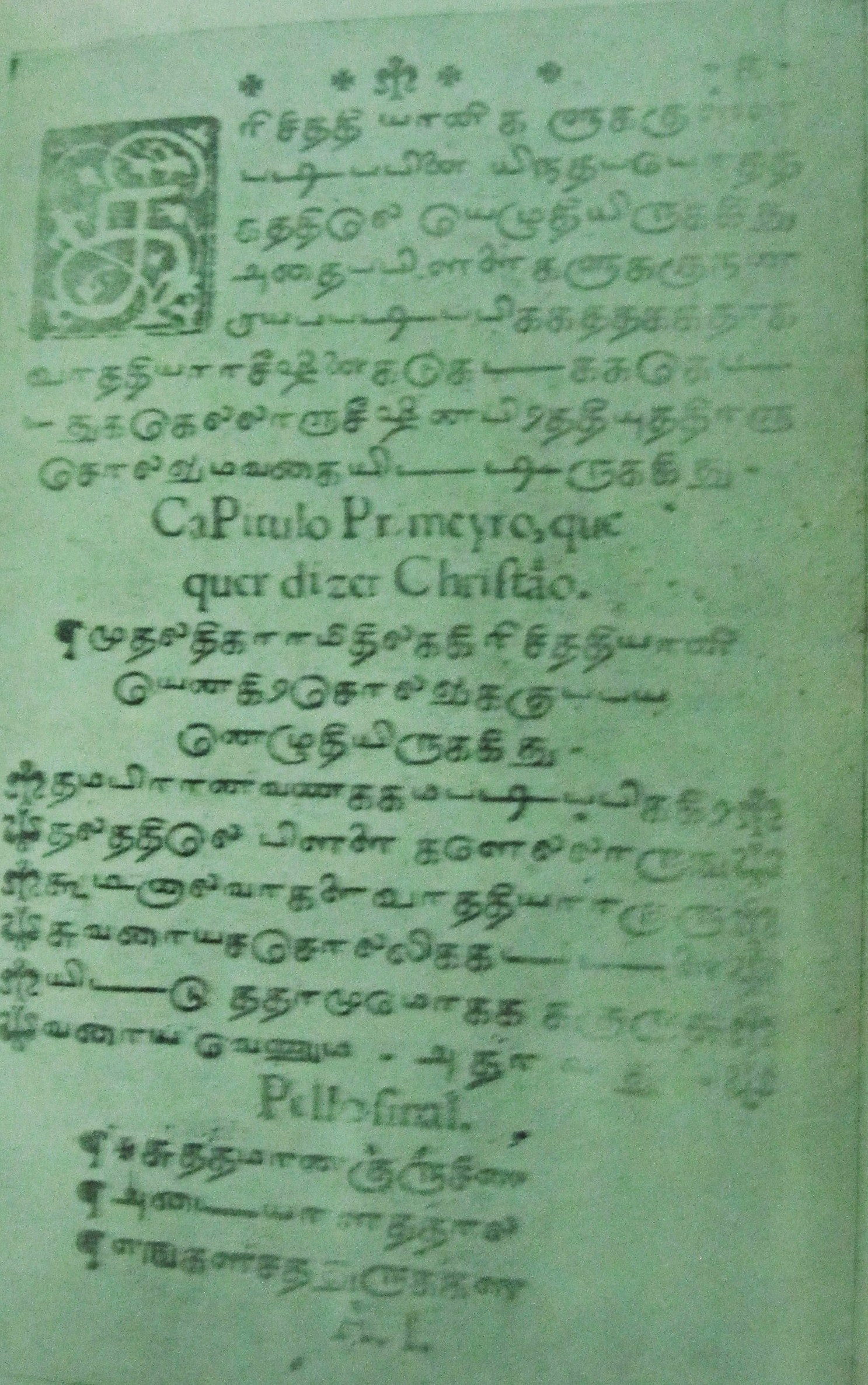
Flos Santorum/Kirisithiani Vanakkam (printed in 1579)

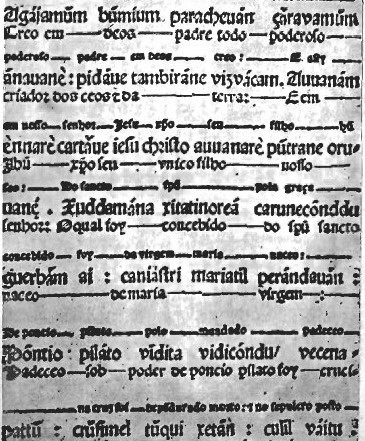
Cartilha, Germano Galhadro printed in Lisbon on 11 February 1554

== See also ==
- Thambiran Vanakkam
- Printing in Tamil language
- Henrique Henriques
