= Dravidian studies =

Academic study of Dravidian culture

Dravidian studies (also Dravidology, Dravidiology) is the academic field devoted to the Dravidian languages, literature, and culture. It is a superset of Tamil studies and a subset of Indology.

== Early missionaries ==
The 16th to 18th century missionaries who wrote Tamil grammars or lexica include Henrique Henriques, Bartholomaeus Ziegenbalg and Constantino Giuseppe Beschi.

Dravidologist	Photo	Period	Work
Henrique Henriques		1520–1600	Portuguese Jesuit priest and missionary. After his initial days in Goa he moved to Tuticorin. As a missionary he strongly believed that books of religious doctrines should be in local languages. He is considered to be the first European Tamil scholar. He set up the first Tamil press and got books printed in Tamil script. The first book printed in Tamil script was "Thambiran Vanakkam" (தம்பிரான் வணக்கம்) (1578), a 16-page translation of the Portuguese "Doctrina Christam". Thereby, Tamil became the first non-European language to be printed on a printing press.
Constantine Beschi also called Vīramāmunivar (Tamil: வீரமாமுனிவர்)		1680 –1742	Italian Jesuit priest and renowned poet in Tamil language. Authored several Tamil dictionaries: including the "Chaturakarati" (சதுரகராதி), a Tamil-Latin and Latin-Tamil-Portuguese dictionary. He translated the famous Thirukkural epic poem of Thiruvalluvar (1730) in Latin. His greatest poetical work is the "Thembavani" (தேம்பாவணி) (the Unfading Garland), a poem on the life of Saint Joseph.
Bartholomaeus Ziegenbalg		1682–1719	Lutheran clergy member and the first Pietist missionary to India. He was among the first Protestant missionaries to arrive in India at the Danish colony of Tranquebar in 1706. He translated the Old and the New Testament into Tamil. In 1708 he compiled "Bibliothece Malabarke", listing the 161 Tamil books he had read and described their content.

== Dravidian language hypothesis ==
The recognition that the Dravidian languages were a phylogenetic unit separate from Indo-European dates to 1816, and was presented by F. W. Ellis, Collector of Madras, at the College of Fort St. George.

== Nineteenth-century experts ==
The 19th century contributors to the field of Dravidology were:

Dravidologist	Photo	Period	Work
Francis Whyte Ellis		1777-1819	Civil servant. First to propose a Dravidian family of languages
Charles Phillip Brown		1798–1884	Collected 2,106 hand written books in South Indian Languages (now with Chennai Library). He provided three services for the Telugu language: he produced his own works in Telugu; he recovered and discovered old Telugu works; and he printed books in Telugu. He authored numerous translations of Telugu works into English.
Robert Caldwell		1814-1891	Research into the languages and the history of the Dravidian region.
Hermann Gundert		1814 – 1893	Authored Malayalam grammar book, "Malayalabhaasha Vyakaranam" (1859) and a Malayalam-English dictionary (1872). Published thirteen Malayalam books including Bible translations.
Ferdinand Kittel		1832–1903	Kannada language and the first Kannada-English dictionary of about 70,000 words in 1894.
Benjamin Lewis Rice		1837-1927	Renowned for his work Epigraphia Carnatica which contains his study of about 9000 inscriptions found in the Old Mysore area. He published twelve volumes over ten years between 1894 and 1905. He authored "The History of Mysore and Coorg" from inscriptions included in the Epigraphia Carnatica.
U. V. Swaminatha Iyer		1855–1942	91 books related to classical Tamil literature. Collected 3,067 paper and palm-leaf manuscripts.
T. R. Sesha Iyengar		1887-1939	Dravidologist renowned for his book "Dravidian India".
K. A. Nilakanta Sastri		1892–1975	Renowned Dravidologist and prolific historian. Authored 25 historical works mostly on the history of South India.
P. T. Srinivasa Iyengar		1863–1931	Noted Dravidologist of the 20th century. Authored numerous works on Tamil and Indian history.
Sakkottai Krishnaswami Aiyangar		1871–1946	Noted for his work in turning around and running the "Journal of Indian History" in the 1920s. He authored many historical works on South Indian and Indian history.
Korada Ramakrishnaiah		1891–1962	Authored 26 works of fundamental importance and extended the borders of Research in Telugu.
V. R. Ramachandra Dikshitar		1896–1953	Known for authoring numerous works on Tamil and Indian history.

== Twentieth-century experts ==
The noted Dravidologists from the twentieth century are:

Dravidologist	Photo	Period	Work
Murray Barnson Emeneau		1904-2005	Renowned for his work the "Dravidian Etymological Dictionary" (1961), written with Thomas Burrow. Emeneau studies lesser known languages of the Dravidian family - Toda, Badaga, Kolami and Kota. Emeneau is also credited with the study of areal phenomena in linguistics, with his seminal article, "India as a Linguistic Area".
T. Burrow		1909-1986	Renowned for his work the "Dravidian Etymological Dictionary" (1961), written with Murray Barnson Emeneau. Also known for his work in Sanskrit.
Kamil Zvelebil		1927–2009	Czech scholar in Indian literature and Dravidian linguistics. Author of numerous books on Dravidian linguistics and Tamil literature.
Bhadriraju Krishnamurti		1928–2012	Eminent Dravidianist and one of the most respected Indian linguists of his generation. His work "The Dravidian Languages" is considered a landmark volume in the study of Dravidian linguistics. His work "Telugu Verbal Bases" (1961) is the first comprehensive account of comparative Dravidian phonology. He is also author of numerous works in Telugu and English on the subject.
Iravatham Mahadevan		1930–2018	Renowned for his work on the decipherment of the Tamil-Brahmi script. He also published a corpus of the Indus script and stood by the Dravidian hypothesis.

== Contemporary programs ==
The Dravidian University at Kuppam, Andhra Pradesh has created Chairs in the names of Western and Dravidian scholars to encourage research in individual Dravidian languages as well as comparative Dravidian studies:

- Bishop Caldwell's Chair for Dravidian Studies
- C. P. Brown's Chair for Telugu Studies
- Kittel Chair for Kannada Studies
- Constantine Beschi Chair for Tamil Studies
- Gundert Chair for Malayalam Studies.

== Literature ==
- Robert Caldwell, Comparative Grammar of Dravidian Languages (1856; revised edition 1875).
- Bhadriraju Krishnamurti (2003). The Dravidian Languages. Cambridge University Press. ISBN 0521771110.
- Thomas R. Trautmann, Languages and nations: the Dravidian proof in colonial Madras, University of California Press, 2006, ISBN University of California Press, 2006.
- Murray Barnson Emeneau (1994). Dravidian Studies: Selected Papers. Motilal Banarsidass. ISBN 8120808584.

== Film ==
The 2021 Indian documentary film Dreaming of Words traces the life and work of Njattyela Sreedharan, a fourth standard drop-out, who compiled a multilingual dictionary connecting four major Dravidian languages Malayalam, Kannada, Telugu, and Tamil. Travelling across four states and doing extensive research, he spent twenty five years making this multilingual dictionary.

== See also ==
- Indology
- Proto-Dravidian
- Elamo-Dravidian
- Dreaming of Words
