= Printing in Goa =

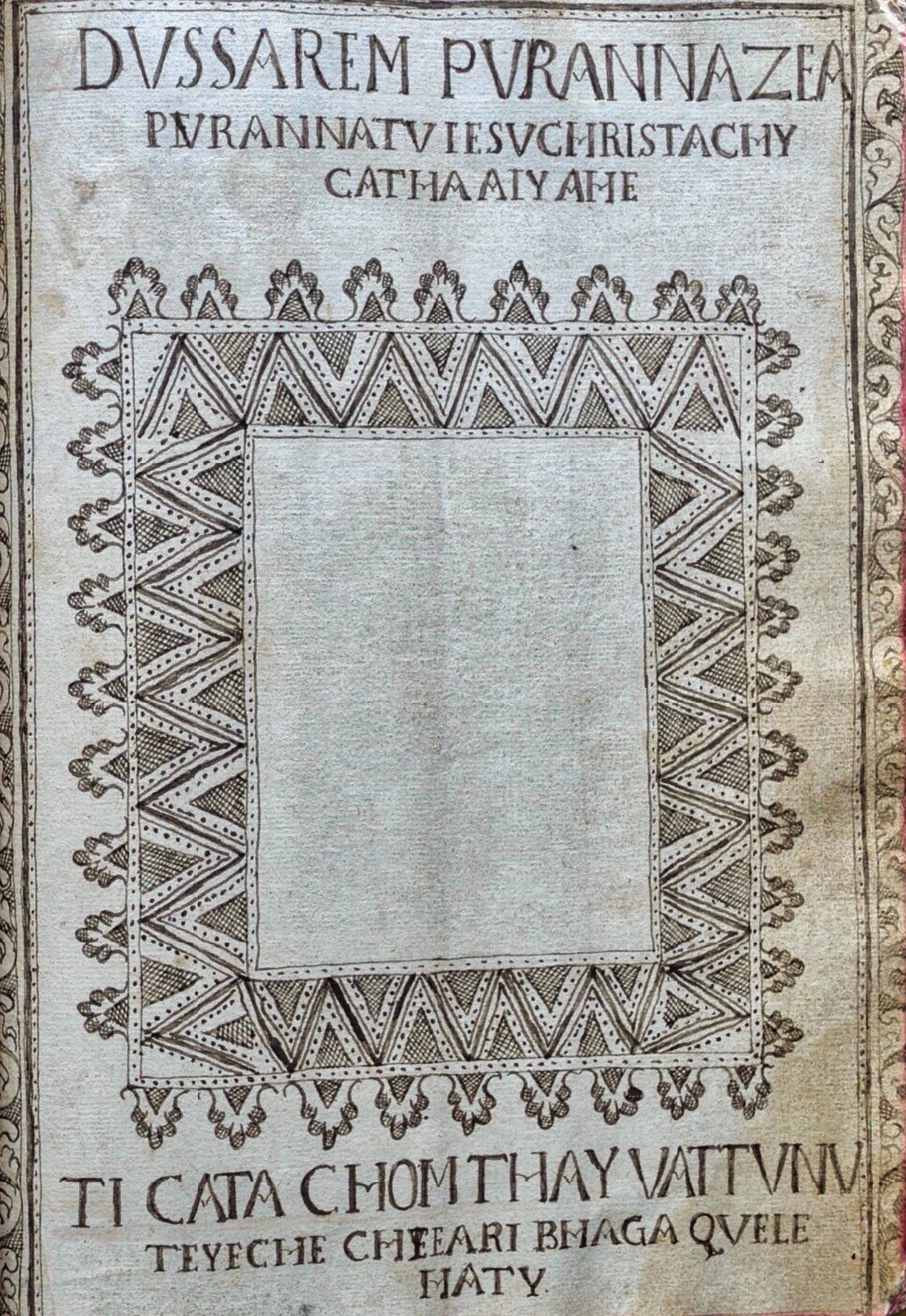
A page of a rare incomplete copy of the Krista Purana by Thomas Stephens, an epic poem about the life of Christ written in Konkani and Marathi (manuscript from 1616, now in the British Library)

The art of printing first entered India through Goa. In a letter to St. Ignatius of Loyola, written on April 30, 1556, Father Gasper Caleza speaks of a ship carrying a printing press setting sail for Abyssinia from Portugal, with the purpose of helping missionary work in Abyssinia. Circumstances prevented this printing press from leaving India, and consequently, printing was initiated in India. And thus, the first mechanical movable-type printing press in Asia was established in Goa in 1556 by the Jesuits at St. Paul’s College, Old Goa.

== The arrival of the first press ==
There is evidence that the use of the concept of mass duplication in India dates back to the time of the Indus Valley civilization. Grants of land were originally recorded by engraving the information on copper plates and etchings on different surfaces like wood, bone, ivory and shells. However, printing arrived about a hundred years after the Gutenberg Bible was first printed.

Many factors contributed to the necessity of the initiation of printing in the subcontinent, the primary being evangelization and the Jesuits were solely responsible for this. Francis Xavier is known to have been teaching the Bible in Tharangambadi (Tranquebar), Tamil Nadu, around 1542. Also, when the viceroy of Goa, on behalf of King João III of Portugal, opened schools for Indians, Francis Xavier pressured Portugal to make printing presses available to India, Ethiopia and Japan. Meanwhile, the emperor of Abyssinia (now Ethiopia) also requested Portugal to send a press along with missionaries. Consequently, the first batch of Jesuit missionaries, along with the printing press, left for Ethiopia on March 29, 1556, on a Spanish ship. The patriarch-designate of Abyssinia, João Nunes Barreto, as well as a team of technicians accompanied the press.

The prevalent route from Portugal to Abyssinia then required ships to round the Cape of Good Hope, touch Goa and reach Abyssinia. The press thus reached Goa, but soon after, news reached Goa that the Abyssinian emperor was not keen on receiving the missionaries. Around the same time, the clergy in Goa felt the need for a printing press and on their request to the then governor-general the press was made available to them. Thus, the press stayed in Goa. This was after Mexico had seen its first printing press, but preceded the press in Lima. The patriarch-designate Barreto was detained in Goa, and it appears he never left India but died in Goa on December 22, 1562.

== Saint Paul's College and the first works printed ==
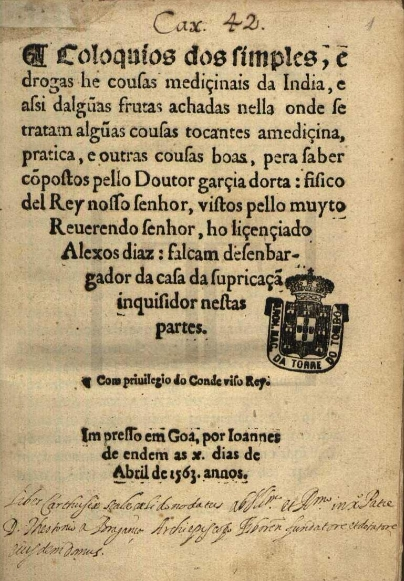
Cover page of Colóquios by Garcia da Orta. Goa, 1563.

Printing operations began in Goa in 1556 (with the first printing press being established at the Jesuit Saint Paul's College in Old Goa), resulting in the publication of Conclusiones Philosophicas. The year 1557 saw the posthumous printing of St. Francis Xavier's Catecismo da Doutrina Christa five years after the death of its author. No extant copy of this work is, however, available.

== Juan Bustamante and the early days of printing in India ==
The individual responsible for the initiation of printing in India was one João de Bustamante (rechristened João Rodrigues in 1563), a Spaniard who joined the Society of Jesus in 1556. Bustamante, who was an expert printer, along with his Indian assistant set up the new press and began to operate it. Among others, four books are known to have been printed by Bustamante:

- Conclusões e outras coisas (Theses and other things) in 1556.
- Confecionarios in 1557.
- Doutrina Christa by St. Francis Xavier in 1557.
- Tratado contra os erros scismaticos dos Abexins (A Tract against the Schismatic Errors of the Abyssinians) by Gonçalo Rodrigues in 1560.

The earliest, surviving printed book in India is the Compendio Spiritual da Vida Christãa (Spiritual Compendium of the Christian life) of Gaspar Jorge de Leão Pereira, the Portuguese Archbishop of Goa. It was printed by João de Quinquencio and João de Endem in 1561, and re-edited by Manuel de Araujo in 1600, and was embellished with ornate woodcut initials on each opening chapter. This was followed by the printing of Garcia da Orta's Colóquios dos simples e drogas he cousas medicinais da Índia on 10 April 1563 by João de Endem. In 1568, the first illustrated cover page (the illustration being done with the relief technique of woodblock) was printed in Goa for the book Constituciones do Arcebispado de Goa.

== Printing in the vernacular ==
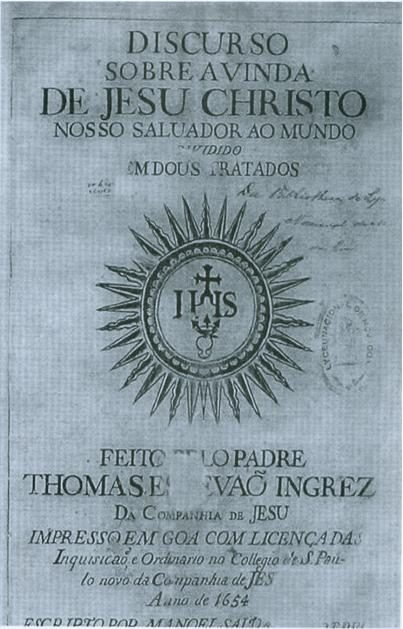
Third edition of the Krista Purana, by Thomas Stephens, 1654

Another Spaniard to play a major role in the history of printing in India was João Gonsalves, who is credited with preparing the first printing types of an Indian script—Tamil. However, since they were not satisfactory, new casts were made in Quilon (Kollam) by Father João da Faria. On 20 October 1578, these types were used to print the first book in an Indian language in India (the first Tamil book was printed in Lisbon in 1554 in romanized Tamil script.)—Henrique Henriques's Doctrina Christam en Lingua Malauar Tamul – Tampiran Vanakam, a Tamil translation of St Francis Xavier's Doutrina Christa. This 16-page book of prayers and catechetical instructions was printed in Quilon. Although no extant copies of the first edition are available, manuscript copies dating 1548–1614 are preserved in Lisbon and Rome. It should be mentioned here that Henriques was inducted into the Society of Jesus with the express intention of sending him to India to assist Francis Xavier. After the first press, a second press was set up. Not much is known about it save that it belonged to John Quinquencio and John Endem. The third press was set up in the St. Ignatius College, Rachol. Though Devanagari types were cast in 1577, the Christa Purana—an epic poem on the life of Jesus Christ written in the literary form of the Hindu puranas—was published not in Devanagari but in the Roman script in the College of Rachol (1616 and 1649) and the College of St Paul (1654). This was primarily because of the intricate shapes of the Devanagari types. In 1626, Diogo Reberio compiled the Vocabulario da lingoa Canarim (A Vocabulary of the Konkani language) a Konkani–Portuguese and Portuguese–Konkani dictionary.

The 17th century saw the beginning of a large-scale book-printing in Goa, egged on massively by the need to print Christian texts for the benefit of the newly converted Christians. This time also saw a shift from the use of coercion to that of religious education for conversions. Thus, a number of books were printed in Konkani and Marathi due to the initiative of, among others, Father Thomas Stephens (who, in 1640, produced the first Konkani grammar—the Arte de Lingua Canarim—and in 1622, published Doutrina Christam em lingoa Bramana Canarim, ordenada a maneira de dialogo, pera ensinar os mininos, por Thomas Estevao, Collegio de Rachol or Christian Doctrines in the Canarese Brahmin Language, arranged in dialogue to teach children, which was the first book in Konkani and any Indian language), Father Antonio Saldanha, Father Etienne do la Croix, Father Miguel do Almeida and Father Diogo Ribeiro (whose Declaraçam da Doutrina Christam, or Exposition of Christian Doctrine in Konkani was printed in 1632). Despite the efforts of Father Stephens and the general familiarity of the Devanagari script, it was found easier to cast not Devanagari, but Roman types for Konkani. This was one of the major factors that alienated Konkani from other Indian languages, since the Roman script failed to fix a number of Konkani sounds that the Europeans faced difficulty in pronouncing. It was, however, this adoption of the Roman script for printing in the vernacular helped printing to flourish in Goa till 1684, when the official decree suppressed the vernacular languages and printing suffered a setback. Printing in Tamil stopped after 1612, and the last books printed in Latin and Portuguese before printing fairly died were published in 1674.

== Ziegenbalg and the revival of printing ==
It was not until 1706 when Bartholomaeus Ziegenbalg, a Danish missionary, arrived at Tharangambadi that printing in India could flourish again. A printing press arrived around 1712–1713 and the Tranquebar Press produced its first publications. On Ziegenbalg's insistence, the first Tamil publication from the press reached the mass in 1713, followed by the New Testament in 1714. It was as late as 1821 that printing was revived in Goa with the starting of a weekly called Gazeta de Goa, later known as the Chronista Constitucional de Goa (1835) and still later, the Boletim de Governo do Estado da India (1837).

== Later years ==
From 1940 to 1960 there were four to six printers in Goa, of which the prominent ones were J. D. Fernandes, Gomantak Printers and Borkar Printers. Smaller entrepreneurs also joined the fray. One of these was a teacher in a local school in Churchorem. Rohidas Bandekar quit his profession to start a press—Bandekar Offset—with a meagre investment of Rs 24,000.
