= João de Bustamante =

Brother João de Bustamante or Juan de Bustamante (born 1536 – August 23, 1588), also known as 'the Indian Gutenberg', was a Spanish missionary who inaugurated the first era of print in India, specifically in the Portuguese colony of Goa.

== Contribution to the initiation of print in India ==
Bustamante was born in Valencia, Spain. He joined the Society of Jesus in 1556 and was ordained in 1564, having been rechristened João Rodrigues the previous year. He was an expert printer who accompanied the printing press that reached India en route from Portugal to Ethiopia (then Abyssinia) with a batch of Jesuit missionaries. However, soon after, news reached Goa that the Abyssinian Emperor was not well-disposed towards the missionaries. Around the same time, the clergy in Goa felt the need for a printing press and requested the then Governor-General to make the press available to them. Since circumstances prevented the press from leaving India, Bustamante was required to set it up. He was aided by his unnamed assistant of Indian origin and thus, printing began in India. Bustamante was among the two most important Europeans to play a role in the history of printing in India, along with his colleague João Gonçalves, another Spaniard by birth, who is credited with casting and preparing the first printing types of an Indian script – Tamil – in Goa in 1577, with the assistance of the convert Pero Luis, which were later used by Henrique Henriques for Thambiran Vanakkam.

== Works printed ==
Among others, four books are confirmed to have been printed by Bustamante:

- Conclusões e outras coisas (Theses and other things) in 1556.
- Doutrina Christa by Francis Xavier in 1557.
- Confecionarios in 1557.
- Tratado contra os erros scismaticos dos Abexins (A Tract against the Schismatic Errors of the Abyssinians) by Gonçalo Rodrigues in 1560.

== See also ==
- Printing in Tamil language
