= Vitthala's invasion of Fishery Coast =

1544 invasion in India

- Part of Vijayanagar-Portuguese conflicts
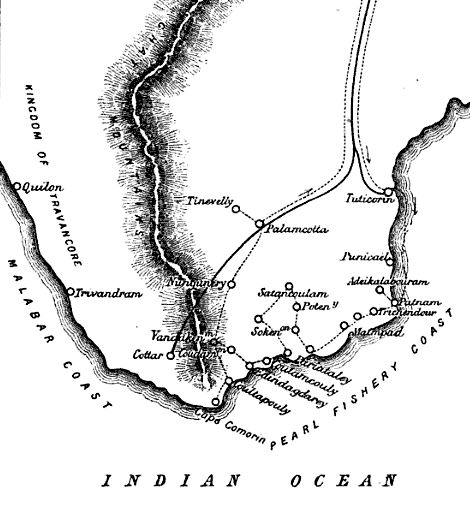
- Later (1889) map of the Pearl Fishery Coast.
Date	1544
Location	Pearl Fishery Coast, Tamilnadu, India
Result	Vijayanagara victory

Belligerents
Vijayanagara Empire: Madurai Nayakas	Portuguese Empire

Commanders and leaders
Vitthala; Rama Raya	(Portuguese Empire) Martim Afonso de Sousa

Casualties and losses
- Large number of christian Paravas were killed

Vitthala's invasion of Fishery Coast in 1544 was a military campaign launched by the Vijayanagar Empire to reclaim control over the Paravas and their valuable pearl fisheries from Portuguese dominance. Ordered by Regent Ramaraya, Vitthala launched a large scale invasion after securing victory over the Travancore ruler at Kottar. His forces, including the Badagas, ravaged key Portuguese settlements such as Punnaikayal, Tuticorin, and Manapad, forcing the Paravas and Portuguese to flee to nearby islands. The invasion was largely fueled by the Portuguese capture of Vitthala's brother-in-law, which enraged the Badagas. The occupation was short-lived by 21 August 1544, the Badagas withdrew to Kalakkadu, due to the Portuguese releasing the captive.

== Background ==
One of Vitthala's primary objectives in invading the Tamil region was to suppress Portuguese influence along the Coromandel and Pearl Fishery Coast's stretching from Rameswaram to Cape Comorin. During the reign of Achyuta Deva Raya, the Portuguese, along with Jesuit missionaries, began converting the Paravas the fisherfolk of the region, to Christianity. The circumstances leading to their conversion were tragic. The Fishery Coast was also home to a significant Muslim population, many of whom had settled there after being expelled from Madurai. Over time, these Muslim settlers had gained control over the lucrative pearl fisheries, reducing the Paravas to a state of economic dependence and subjugation. They imposed strict fishing restrictions, preventing the Paravas from engaging in their traditional livelihood without permission and monopolizing the pearl trade. Tensions between the two communities escalated, and in 1532, a seemingly minor dispute between a Parava and a Muslim turned violent. The Parava man was brutally attacked, leaving him severely wounded with one of his ears torn.

The attack on a single Parava man in 1532 was seen as an affront to the entire Parava community, igniting deep-seated tensions between them and the Muslim settlers. Outraged by the insult, the Paravas secretly conspired to retaliate. they launched a surprise assault on the Muslim quarters in Tuticorin killing many of their adversaries. However, their act of vengeance had dire consequences. The surviving Muslims seeking retribution, quickly gathered an army with the support of the neighboring Polygars. Their retaliation was brutal, as they launched an assault on the Paravas both by land and sea. The Paravas ill-equipped to defend themselves against such a formidable force, suffered immensely. They were massacred without mercy, their villages and huts set ablaze, and their fishing equipment the very tools of their livelihood were destroyed.

Amid the horrific massacre of the Paravas Joao Dacruz, a Malabar Christian and eyewitness to the devastation, saw a possible lifeline for the suffering community. Recognizing the growing Portuguese influence in the region, he advised the Paravas to seek help from the Portuguese captain at Cochin believing that their plight would be met with sympathy. Acting on his advice, fifteen of the most influential Parava leaders, known as Pattangattis, accompanied Joao Dacruz to Cochin. There, they were warmly received by the Portuguese captain, Dr. Pero Vaz de Amaral, who saw an opportunity to extend Portuguese influence. He offered them protection from the Muslims on one condition the Paravas had to embrace Christianity. Seeing this as their only hope for survival, the Parava leaders readily agreed. They were baptized by Fr. Miguel Vaz, the Vicar General of India, marking the beginning of a mass conversion movement. Gradually, around 20,000 Paravas converted to Christianity forging a strong alliance with the Portuguese. With this, it became the duty of the Portuguese to protect them.

"And that is how’, ‘our Lord saved so many lives, by means of one torn ear-lobe.

In response to the brutal persecution of the Paravas, the Portuguese governor, Nuno da Cunha dispatched a powerful fleet to the Pearl Fishery Coast to punish the Muslim oppressors. The poorly equipped Muslim boats were no match for the heavily armed Portuguese vessels, and they were utterly destroyed. Most of the Muslim forces were killed, while the surviving boats were seized and handed over to the Paravas as a gesture of goodwill and alliance. The remaining Muslims were driven out of the region. With this victory, the Portuguese established complete control over the coastline, asserting both political and religious supremacy. The Paravas, now Portuguese subjects. The Dutch traveler Johan Nieuhof, while recounting his journeys, recorded the events of 1533 in the Pearl Fishery Coast Say's.

“The Nayak of Madura left the Portuguese in full possession of their jurisdiction over the Paravas and of the free exercise of their religion.”

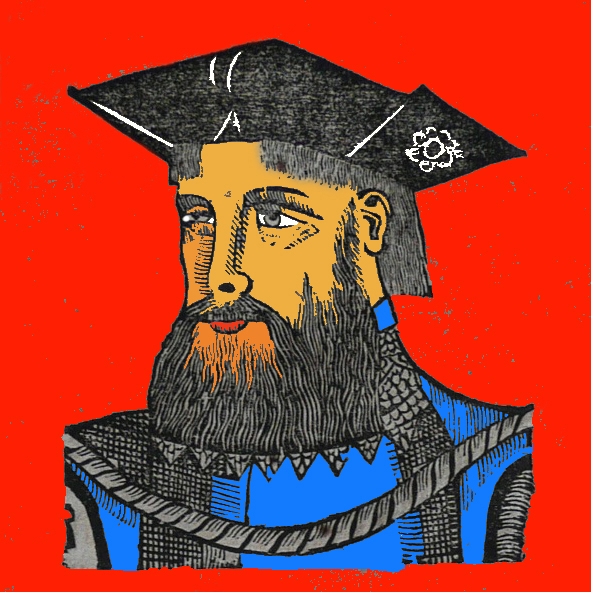
Portrait of Nuno da Cunha

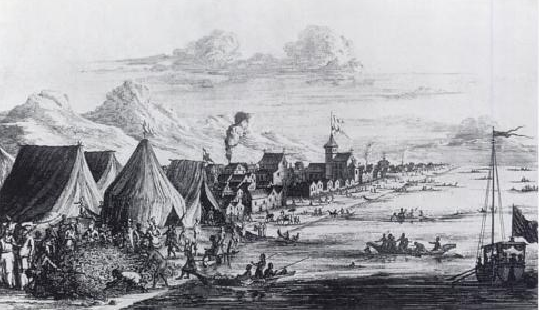
Pearl Fishery at Tuticorin camp, 1662, by Johan Nieuhof.

== Invasion ==
Ramaraya was determined not to let the Paravas and their lucrative pearl fisheries fall entirely under Portuguese control. Recognizing their economic and strategic importance, he ordered Vitthalaraya to bring the Paravas back under Vijayanagara rule, regardless of their newfound Christian faith. After settling matters with the Travancore ruler at Kottar in August 1544, Vitthala shifted his focus to the Pearl Fishery Coast. By this time, the Portuguese had firmly established their presence in key settlements like Manapad, Punnaikayal, Tuticorin, and Vembar, asserting control over both civil and criminal administration along the coast. However, Vijayanagar was not willing to cede this vital region without a fight. According to a letter from St. Francis Xavier dated 3 August 1544, Vitthala launched a large-scale invasion of the Pearl Fishery Coast on that very day. His forces swept through the region.

“The boats must be thrown into the sea in time and the people might embark when the occasion demands. Because Iam sure that the Badagas will attack and capture the Christians.”

In his letter dated 19 August 1544, St. Francis Xavier described the tragic aftermath of Vitthala's invasion. The Parava Christians unable to withstand the brutal assault of the Badagas, fled in terror. The invaders looted their homes, seized their belongings, and mercilessly stabbed two men one a Christian and the other a Hindu. Fear and desperation drove most of the Paravas to abandon their villages. Many sought refuge in the dense forests, while others, in their fragile boats, escaped to the small islands beyond Cape Comorin leaving their homeland at the mercy of the Badagas’ fury.

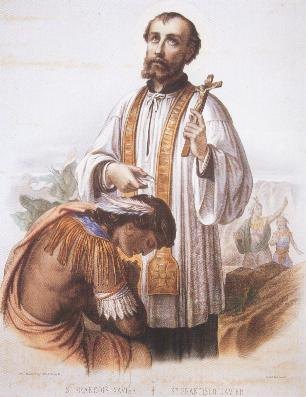
Francis Xavier in a 19th-century colored lithograph.

The Paravas seeking safety from Vitthala's invading forces, fled to the small islands beyond Cape Comorin separated from the mainland by backwater canals. While this natural barrier kept the Vijayanagara soldiers from reaching them. The islands lacked drinking water, leaving the Paravas to suffer from thirst and despair. Meanwhile, the Badagas continued their campaign of destruction, attacking Punnaikayal and setting fire to the homes and boats of the Portuguese captain who, along with his followers was also forced to flee to a remote island. The devastation did not stop there Tuticorin a Portuguese stronghold, was overrun by Vitthala's forces. The once thriving town was left in ruins as the Vijayanagara army swept through and Vitthala established it as his temporary residence.

In a letter to Mansilhas dated 8 September 1544, from Manapad, St. Francis Xavier described the dire condition of the Parava Christians and the Portuguese captain following Vitthala's invasion. Meanwhile, Tuticorin had become Vitthala's base of operations, as even envoys, such as the one sent by Unnikéralavarman, were had to meet him there.

“I am anxious about the Christians of Tuticorin who are in the greatest possible misery. Go at once with all the boats at Kombutturai and Punnaikayal and transport the wretched people from the barren isles to Punnaikayal and Tiruchendir. I conjure you, by our Lord, never let it’be that Beterbemali, the leader of these robber Badagas and all his horde of plundering ruffiians, should have their hearts’ desire fulfilled, that remnants of this most afflicted people should perish of hunger and thirst.”

In his letter dated 7 September 1544, St. Francis Xavier urgently appealed to Mansilhas to gather aid from the wealthy to support the suffering Christians particularly by providing them with much-needed drinking water. The cause of the devastating invasion, Xavier revealed, was the Portuguese capture of a close relative of (Beterbemali) Vitthala's brother-in-law. This act enraged the Badagas, who saw it as a direct insult and rallied in fury, determined to retaliate. Their anger quickly escalated into a violent campaign, with the Badagas vowing to wipe out every Christian settlement along the entire Comorin coast.

== Aftermath ==
The raid on the Pearl Fishery Coast was stopped. By 21 August 1544, St. Francis Xavier writing from Punnaikayal reported that the Badagas had withdrawn from the region and moved towards Kalakkadu. The sudden retreat suggests that a diplomatic resolution may have been reached possibly through the Portuguese releasing Vitthala's brother-in-law, whose capture had provoked the invasion. With the primary cause of conflict resolved, the order for further massacres against the Christians and Portuguese was halted.
