= Tamilology =

Tamilology, or Tamil studies, a subset of the larger field of Dravidian studies, denotes study of the Tamil language, Tamil literature and the culture of the Tamil people.

The journal Tamil Culture was first published in 1952.

== Definition ==
The term denotes the process of examining the study and contributions of Tamil language, Tamil literature and lifestyles of the native Tamil people. And here the term lifestyles covers a vast spectrum of the day-to-day activities of the native Tamil people as can be gleaned from their indigenous literature of all kinds, including grammatical, lexical, epic, lyrical, dramatic, theological, medical, philosophical, moral, jurisprudence and folk literature, containing data about their various rites and rituals, customs and manners, legends and fables, diseases and medicines, literature and education, society and culture, from time immemorial until now.
