= Punnaikayal =

Punnaikkayal
- Village
- Location in Tamil Nadu, India Punnaikkayal (India)
- Coordinates: 8°37′56″N 78°6′43″E
- Country: India
- State: Tamil Nadu

Languages
  - Official: Tamil
- Time zone: UTC+5:30 (IST)

Punnaikkayal (called Punicale by the Portuguese), is a harbour city in Tamil Nadu, India.

Punnaikkayal seems to have been the main Portuguese possession on the southern Coast of India for a period of 50 years after their arrival from 1551, when they established 2 hospitals, a seminary, and the next year a mud fort.

The first Tamil Printing press was set up at Punnaikkayal in 1579. The Tamil Types had been made by Fr. Joam de Faria. Fr. Henrique Henriques himself composed the following books in Tamil: Thambiran Vanakkam, Kiriiciththiyaani valvakkam, Confessionario (in Tamil: Kompeciyoonaayaru), and the Flos Sanctorum in Tamil, whose title has not come down to us, though we have the whole book.

Punnaikkayal was the site of an Ottoman attack against the Portuguese possessions of the coast of India in 1553. The Ottomans raided the Pearl Fishery Coast of South India around Tuticorin, where the Portuguese were attempted to establish trade. They were assisted by the Marakkar Muslims of Malabar, and had the tacit agreement of Vittula Nayak of Madurai. 52 Portuguese were captured at Punnaikayal, and churches burnt down.

Henrique Henriques died at Punnaikkayal in 1600.

Historical World Record of Being The First Dedicated Tamil Printing Press in the world, build in Punnaikkayal by Rev. Fr. Henrique Henriques (1520-1600) of the Jesuit Missionaries (aka. Society of Jesus) in the 16th Century and to print the book titled "Flos Sanctorum" (Adiyar Varalaaru) in Tamil language in 1586, as Universel Achievers book of Records ISO Official world record certification organization Confirmed on 18th November, 2021.

== Notable people ==
- Bishop Francis Tiburtius Roche An Indian Jesuit priest, First Indian origin Catholic Bishop and First Bishop of Roman Catholic Diocese of Tuticorin

== See also ==
- Paravar
