= Thambiran Vanakkam =

Book by Henrique Henriques

Thambiran Vanakkam (Doctrina Christam en Lingua Malauar Tamul)
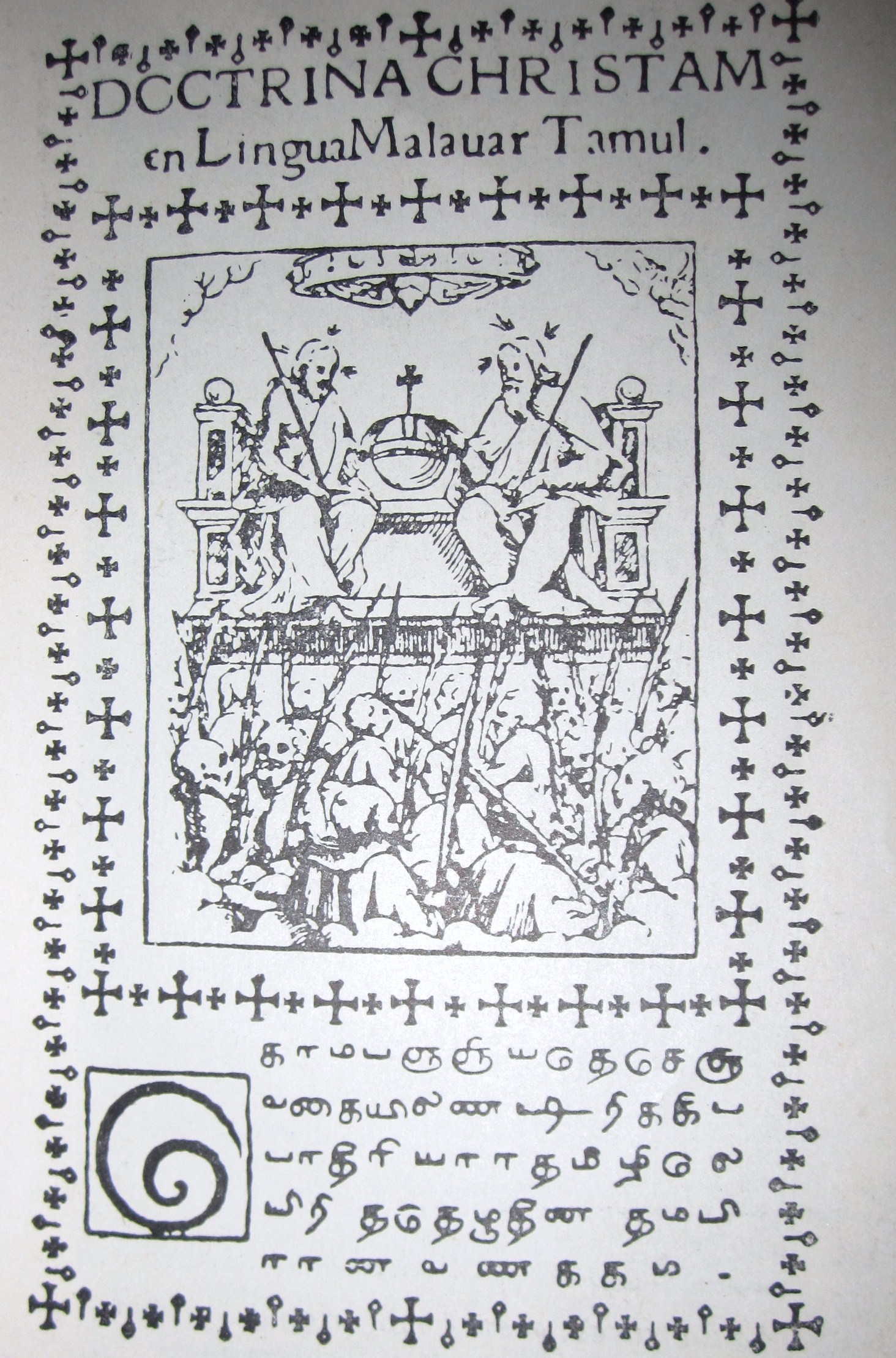
- Front page of Thambiran Vanakkam
- Author: Henrique Henriques
- Original title: தம்பிரான் வணக்கம்
- Language: Tamil
- Publication date: 1578
- Publication place: India

Thambiran Vanakkam (also known as Doctrina Christam en Lingua Malauar Tamul in Portuguese; Tamil: தம்பிரான் வணக்கம்) is a Catholic catechism translated by Henrique Henriques and published on 20 October 1578 at Quilon, Venad. It is the first printed work in an Indian language and script.

== See also ==
- Printing in Tamil language
