= Printing in Tamil language =

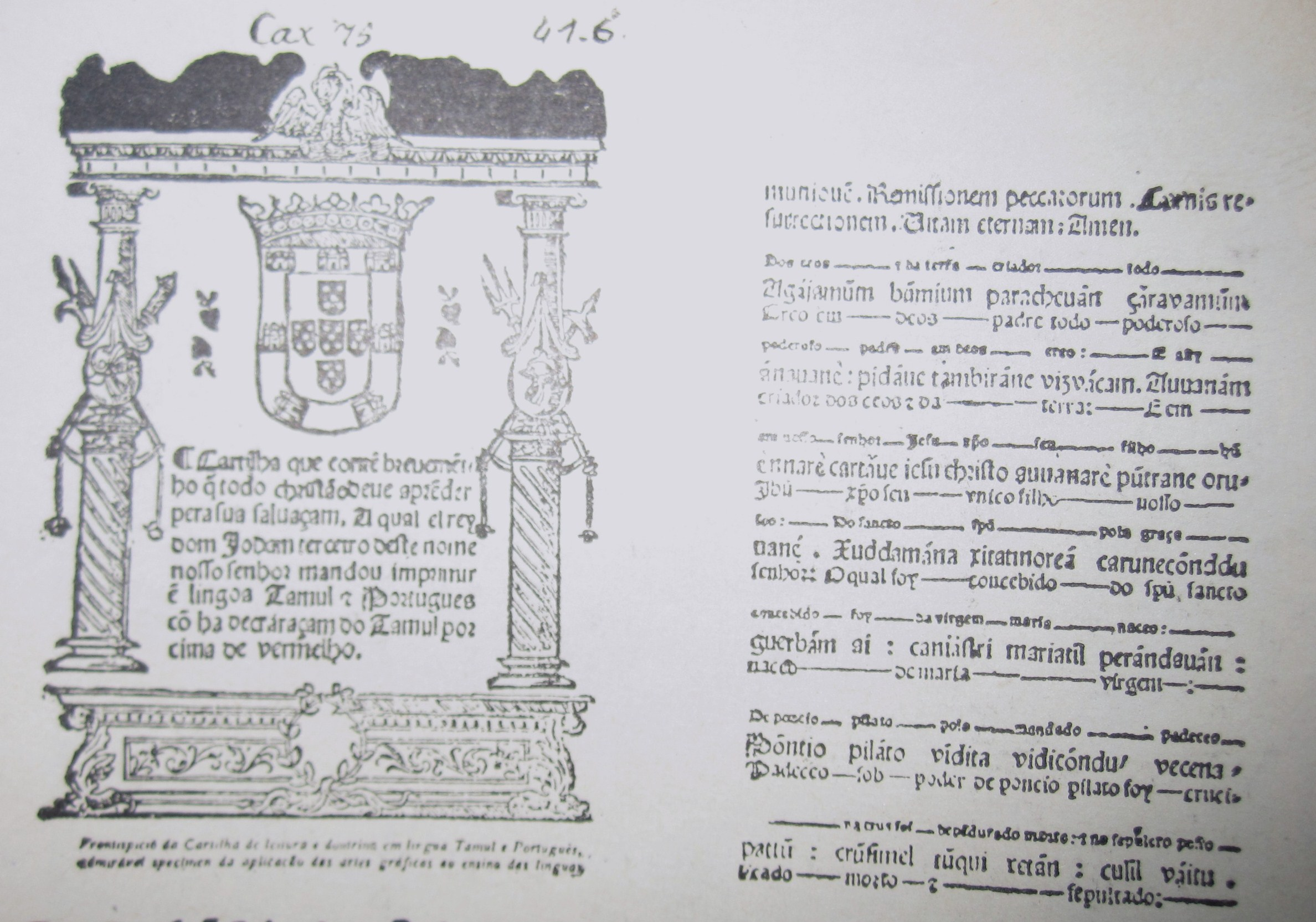
First Tamil book was printed in Lisbon on 1554 AD with Romanized Tamil script.

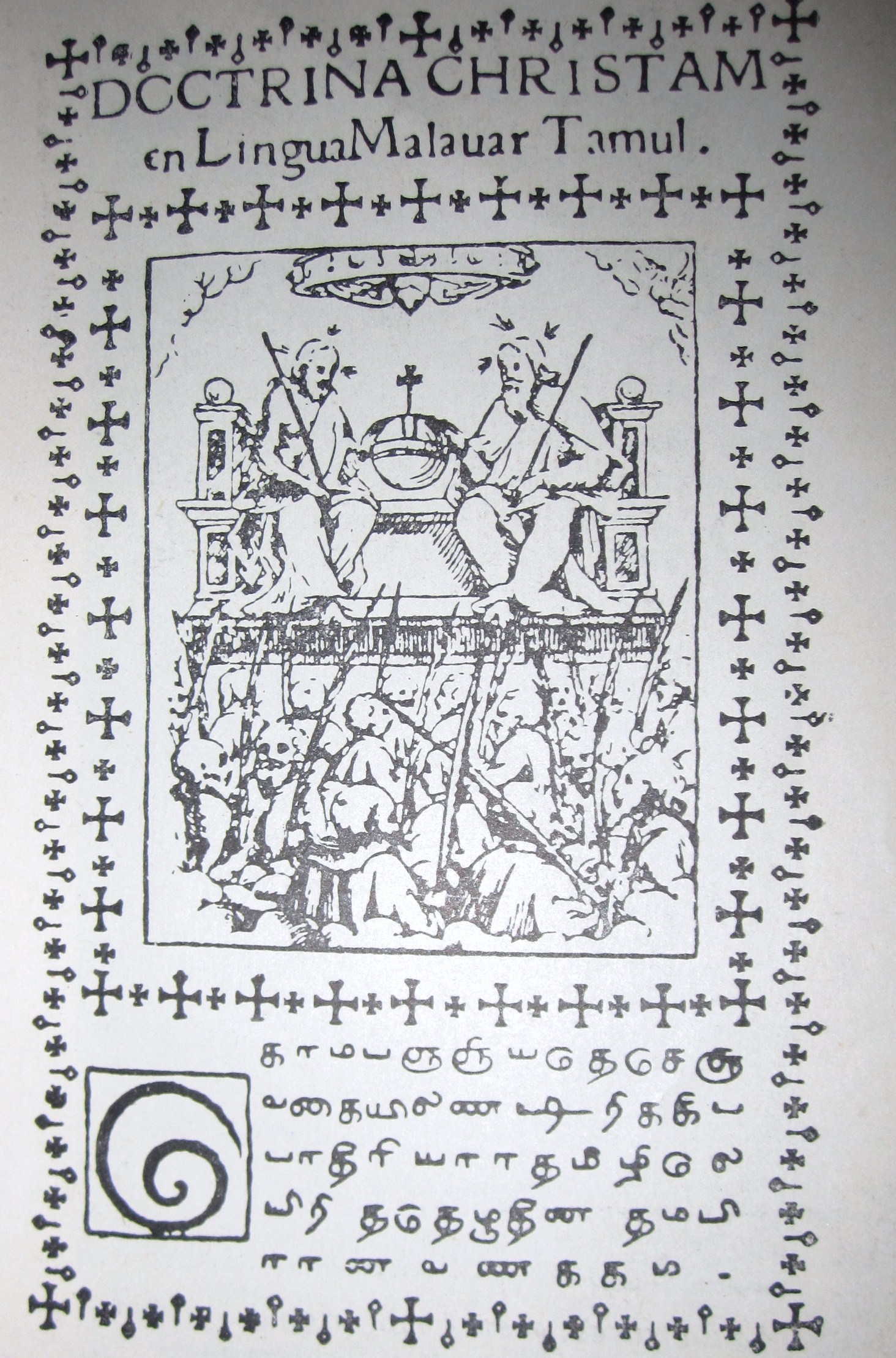
Thambiran Vanakkam

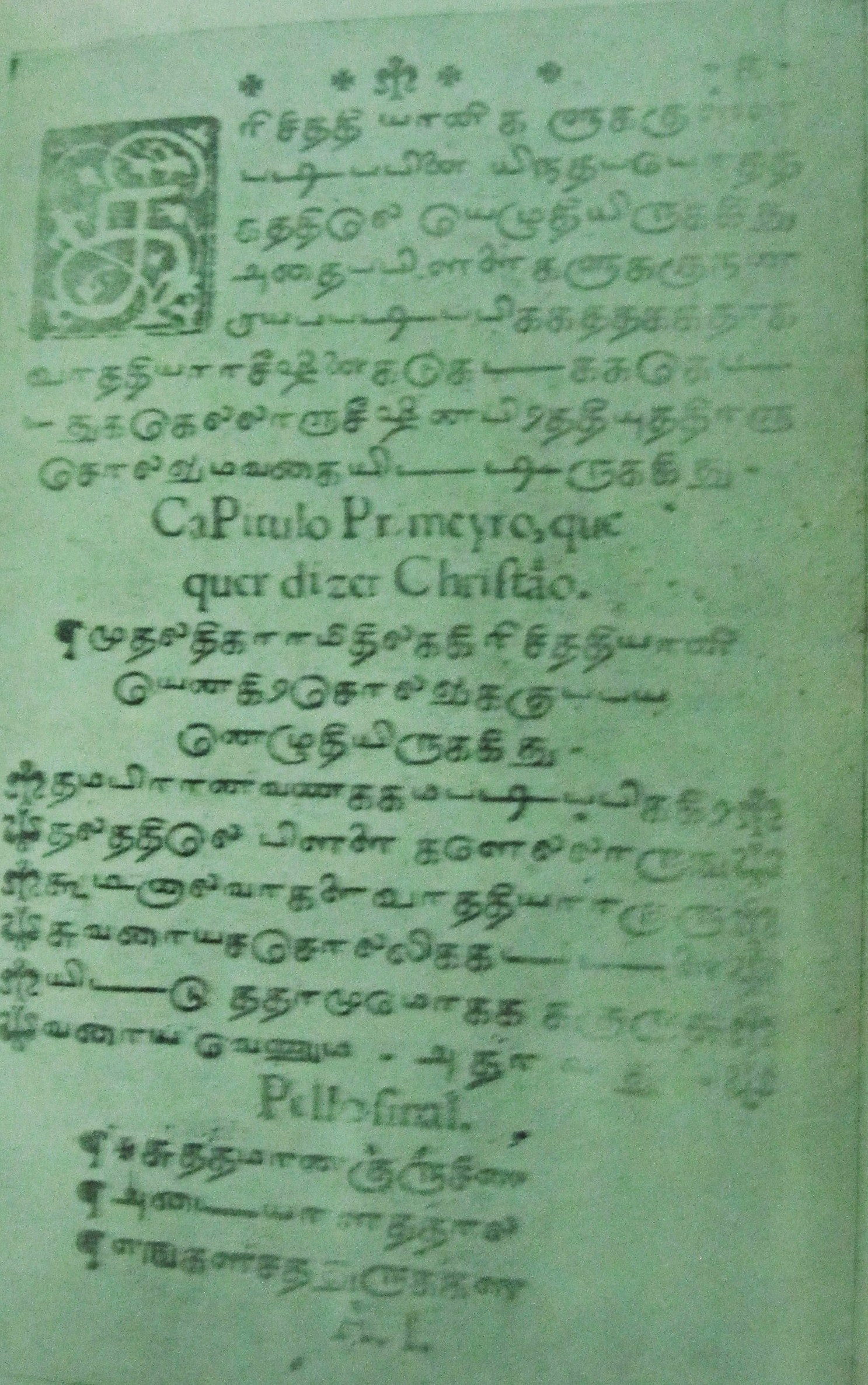
Kirisithiyaani Vanakkam

The introduction and early development of printing in South India is attributed to missionary propaganda and the endeavours of the British East India Company. Among the pioneers in this arena, maximum attention is claimed by the Jesuit missionaries, followed by the Protestant Fathers and Hindu Pandits. Once the immigrants realized the importance of the local language, they began to disseminate their religious teachings through that medium, in effect ushering in the vernacular print culture in India. The first Tamil booklet was printed in 1554 (11 February) in Lisbon - Cartilha em lingoa Tamul e Portugues in Romanized Tamil script by Vincente de Nazareth, Jorge Carvalho and Thoma da Cruz, all from the Paravar community of Tuticorin; making Tamil the first Indian language to be printed.

These developments took place at a time when other locations such as Madurai were still confined to the use of copper plates and stone inscriptions. This book was printed earlier than the first printed and dated books of Russia (1563), Africa (1624) and Greece (1821).

== Henriques and the sixteenth century ==
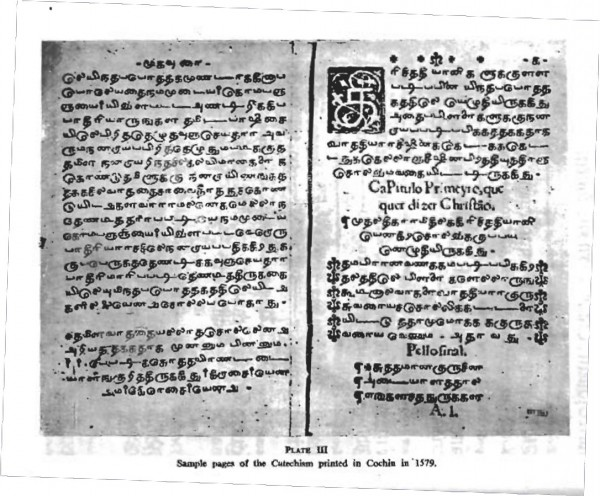
Doctrina Christam - Kirisithiyaani Vanakkam.1579 AD

The appearance of Tamil in print, both in Roman transliteration and in its native script was the result of the convergence between colonial expansion and local politics, coupled with the beginnings of the Jesuit 'Madurai Mission' led, among others, by a Portuguese Jesuit priest, Henrique Henriques who arrived on the Fishery Coast (Tuticorin) in 1547. During his stay Henriques produced five different books in the Tamil script and language, printed at various Jesuit settlements on the west coast. He also compiled a Tamil Grammar and a Tamil Dictionary, which, though never printed, were widely used by other Europeans. Graham Shaw speaks of Henriques as, "the first great European Scholar of any Indian language" (Stuart Blackburn).

Around 1575 Henriques was relieved of his missionary duties on the east coast and moved to Goa where he began to prepare his texts. Henriques was there assisted by Father Pedro Luis, a local Brahman convert, who entered the Jesuit order in 1562. The stage was finally set when Tamil types were cast in Goa by João Gonçalves (perfected by Father João de Faria in Kollam), with the assistance of Luis.

In 1577 the first of the Henriques’ five books, Doctrina Christam en Lingua Malauar Tamul (Thambiran Vanakkam) was printed in Goa. The book was the first book printed with Indian type. Although some scholars refuse to consider this as a historical fact, Graham Shaw seems convinced that it was printed. The second printed Tamil book was only 16 pages long, but a third Catechism of 127 pages, a Tamil translation of the popular Portuguese text by Marcos Jorge, was printed again with new type in Cochin on November 14, 1579. Three Catechisms were printed with three sets of type, at three different locations on the west coast over the following three years. Henriques’ two other books printed at Punnaikayal were:

1. A Confessionary (Confessionairo) 1580 (214 pages)
2. Lives of Saints (Flos Sanctorum), 1586 (669 pages)

== Roberto De Nobili and the seventeenth century ==
In the 17th century, Tamil books were printed at Ambalakad with type made in Rome. Only five in number and printed within a space of two years, these books might be called the second phase of Tamil printing. There were five books but only two texts. The first was Roberto De Nobili’s Catechism, Nanopatecam, printed posthumously in three volumes: Volume 1 in 1677 followed by Volumes 2 and 3 in 1678. The second text was Antem De Proenca’s Tamil-Portuguese Dictionary of 1679.

Unlike Henriques, Roberto de Nobili did not translate a Portuguese text into Tamil, instead he wrote his own manual, so that he might emphasize the hidden truths of the new faith.

== Ziegenbalg and printing in Tranquebar ==
Bartholomäus Ziegenbalg was the pioneer in the setup of a printing press at Madras. In South India the printing press had been established as early as 1578, but printing activities came to an end owing to a gradual decline in the religious zeal of successive generations of missionaries. Tamil printing stopped after 1612, as the numerous writings of Nobili and Manoel Martin lay unpublished in 1649 and 1660. There were some attempts to revive printing, but they proved short-lived. For instance, there is a reference to a Latin–Tamil grammar by Father Beschi, a Sanskrit scholar, having been printed at Ziegenbalg’s press.

Ziegenbalg explained in a number of letters that the books prepared in the Malabar language, to help in the propagation of the Christian faith, were initially written in Portuguese and then translated into the “Malabarick Language” with the help of Indian assistants. In the absence of a printing press the books that had been prepared up until then had to be transcribed by hand. This proved to be a slow, laborious and expensive process. With the objective of facilitating a wider and faster dissemination of Christian literature, Ziegenbalg in his letter of August 22, 1708, put forth a demand for a “Malabarick and Portuguese printing press”. In the meantime, Ziegenbalg devoted considerable attention to collecting manuscripts of Indian literature, as this would help him to understand the old beliefs of the Hindus which he proposed to refute.

In a letter written in 1708, Ziegenbalg speaks of 26 sermons delivered by him at the church of Tranquebar and two vocabularies of Malabar language prepared by him. The first consisted of 26,000 words in common use, and had three columns, the first giving the word in Malabar characters, the second its transliteration and the third its meaning in German. The second contained words used in poetry. For this work Ziegenbalg was assisted by Indian scholars and poets who remained at his house for four months.

Ziegenbalg was keenly aware that to attain his object he needed a printing press. He made repeated demands for a press in his letters of April–June 1709. The Society for Promoting Christian Knowledge, set up in the 1690s, came forward to help under the recommendation of the Rev. A. W. Boehme (the German chaplain to Prince George of Denmark). In 1711 the society sent the mission some copies of the Bible in Portuguese as well as a printing press with pica types and other accessories along with a printer to operate it. The ship was held up by the French near Brazil, and the printer Jones Finck was arrested but later released. Finck soon succumbed to fever near the Cape of Good Hope. The printing press reached India in 1712 unaccompanied by its operator. The press, however, started functioning with the help of a German printer–cum–compositor.

Malabar characters were obtained from Europe. A letter dated April 7, 1713, contains a list of 32 books in the Malabar language, original works as well as translations, and 22 books in Portuguese prepared by the missionaries. It is stated that the books in the Malabar language included a vocabulary written on paper and another written on palm leaves.

According to a letter of January 3, 1714, the work of printing the New Testament in Tamil had already begun. Another letter of September 27, 1714, states that, "The Four Evangelists and Acts of the Apostles" was already printed. Reportedly, this is the oldest Tamil book printed at Tranquebar, a copy of which is available at the Serampore College Library. From 1715 onwards with the completion of the New Testament, printing activity in Tamil commenced in full swing. In 1715 Ziegenbalg wrote a concise grammar of the Malabar language for use by Europeans and had it printed by 1716. A copy of this book also exists at the Serampore College Library. Ziegenbalg and his collaborators aimed at spreading their printed work all over India. Consequently, their marketing strategies cajoled them to produce almanacs which were quite scarce in the country. A Sheet Almanac was printed and sold on the coast of Coromandel as well as in Malabar and Bengal.

== Constanzo G. Beschi ==
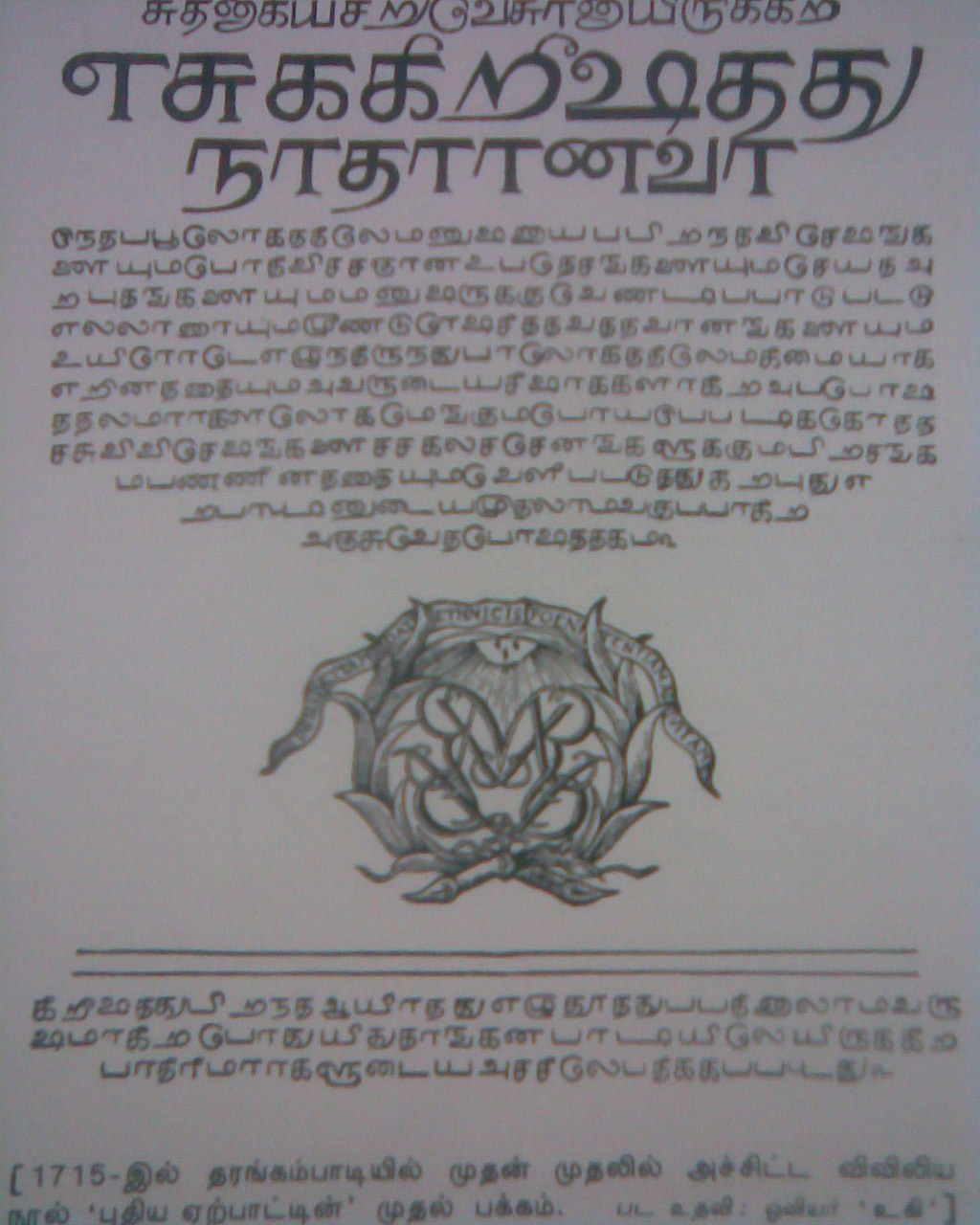
Tamil Bible Printed in 1715 at Tharangambadi

Parallel to printing efforts by the Protestant missionaries at Tranquebar or Tarangampãdi, the growth of the Jesuit missionary Constanzo Beschi (Viramãmunivar; Constantine Joseph Beschi 1680–1747) was equally significant in revolutionizing the face of Tamil print and literature. The difference in the Christian beliefs of the respective cults gave rise to rigorous disputes and theological debates, which on many occasions even led to violent conflicts resulting in injuries and death. These disputes were carried on by the Lutherans through "printed books and pamphlets", whereas Beschi (due to lack of a Jesuit-owned printing press) mainly concentrated on writing influential pieces of literature. Although printing in Tamil was introduced by the Jesuits, by the eighteenth century the scenario had changed and the domain of the press came to be majority controlled and cultivated by the Protestants. Beschi's efforts in a place populated with thousands of Lutheran converts (mainly Tanjore and Travancore), grew to become an "alarming", "arrogant" and "formidable" rival to the already sprawling missionary activities of the Protestant fathers. One particular reason for Beschi's popularity was, as Blackburn observes, his "Romanish compromises with local customs". In the books of Muttusami Pillai (Beschi's Tamil biographer), he is frequently portrayed as a traditional Eastern or Oriental king, adorned with ornate jewellery and chandan on his forehead. Beschi was reportedly favoured by the local rulers, especially Chanda Sahib whom he had served diwan to, thereby making it easier for him to master the language. He was intelligent enough to adopt such means which would undoubtedly benefit him in ways more than one.

Contrary to this image, Beschi has also been examined as a magical Indian "poet-saint" with extraordinary literary skills and persuasion prowess. Beschi's written works constituted the substructure of modern Tamil literary acculturation. According to sources, Beschi wrote more than twenty books :– dictionaries, epic poetry, prose collections, grammar, folklore. His major prose essay was Veta Vilakkam which ran to 250 pages. The first bilingual Tamil grammar printed in India is also credited to Beschi. He composed various interlingual dictionaries: Tamil-Latin, Latin-Tamil-Portuguese, and Tamil-French and most importantly the four-way lexicon Tamil-Tamil Catur-Agarati which comprised meanings, synonyms, rhymes, etc. This book was not printed before 1824. Although it cannot be assumed that his works were well accepted and appreciated by the Protestants, as Blackburn comments, the rival camp unbiasedly “admired Beschi’s literary skills - they printed one of his grammars and another of his books (Vetiyar Olukkam, A Manual for Catechists) became standard reading for them by the nineteenth century…”. Beschi's Parramarta Kuruvin Kattai or Guru Simpleton was the first printed book of Tamil folktale.

=== Guru Simpleton ===
Beschi's Guru Simpleton (which occupies a status similar to The Arabian Nights or The Panchatantra in Tamil culture) is a blend of the oral tradition of Tamil folklore and the European story form, wrapped in the author's imaginative faculty. Although Beschi had completed its composition (along with a preface) by 1776, the book was not published singularly until 1822 in London. Records show that Beschi wrote the Tamil version first and later translated it into Latin. Although Beschi claimed that the sole purpose of the book was to disseminate amusement and humour among both locals and missionaries, Blackburn mentions that the author was most probably yearning for something more than that – “this was a plea for a Jesuit patron, somewhere outside India, to underwrite the publication of his dictionary and folktale”, as print was a more reliable medium to “demonstrate correct spelling” than local scribes and copyists.

== Printed oral tales in Tamil ==
In the history of print in early nineteenth-century India there were an enormous number of books of oral literature, especially folktales published. Between 1800 and 1835 most printed books in Tamil(dictionaries and grammars aside) were collections of oral tales. Well known literary texts, such as Tirrukkural and Nalatiyar, also appeared in print, but these classical texts were outnumbered by books of oral tales. The first of these was Vikkiramatittan Katai, a collection of folktales in the framework of a literary tale which appeared in 1804, followed by the Catamuka Ravanan Katai in 1808; the Mariyatai Raman Katai and Tamilariyum Mantai Katai in 1812; the Pururava Cakravarti Katai in 1819; the Katamantacari, a collection of oral tales in 1820; the Tamil – English bilingual publication of Paramartta Kuruvin Katai (Guru Simpleton) in 1822 (in London); a Tamil Pancatantra in 1826; the Katacintamani, another collection of oral tales, in 1833; and translations of tales from English, French and Aesop by the 1850s. Some of these books are still available today.

== Printing by Pundits ==
A number of early Tamil print publishing houses were set up by the pundits in the 1830s in Madras. These establishments played a significant role in the consolidation of the commercial printing world. They were also involved in public–politics, the anti–missionary movement in Georgetown, for instance. Pundits who were educated at the College Fort of St George and some who were not, used the text-making skills they learned from the Europeans in setting up of their own presses at Madras.

The rise of the pundit - presses saw growth during the 1830s with Kalvi Vilakkam, the joint venture of Charavanaperumal Aiyar and Vichakaperumal Aiyar in 1834. The press functioned till the 1850s producing more than 50 books. This was followed by the Sarasvati Press (1835) of Tiruvenkatachala Mutaliar, and Kalvi Kalanchiyam set up in 1839 by Umapati Mutaliar and his three brothers. These presses quickly became associated with movements in deflecting the missionaries as they started voicing the sentiments of certain sections of the Hindu community.

== Arumuka Navalar ==
Arumuka Navalar spearheaded the Saivism cult both in Sri Lanka and in Tamil Nadu. He was the guardian of pure and pristine Saiva tradition. He established a number of schools for Tamil and Saivism and printing presses at Jaffna, Chidambaram and Madras. He was the most fluent Tamil speaker and writer of his generation. At the age of 27, Arumugam was conferred the title of “Navalar”, the eloquent.

In the context of printing, Arumuka Navalar or Arumuga Navalar was an editor of old Tamil texts. Among his editions the most important are Mantalapurutar's lexicon cutamani nikantu with commentary (first printed in 1849), the standard medieval grammar Nannūl with a commentary (1851), the early devotional poem Tirumurukāṟṟuppaṭai, Manikkavacakar’s great devotional poems Tiruvacakam and tirukkovaiyar, the text of Tirukkuṛaḷ with Parimelazhagar’s detailed gloss in 1861.

Arumuga Navalar apparently introduced few novel features in the area of Tamil editing. He was probably the first to use punctuation marks like the semicolon, the question mark and the exclamation mark. He produced the first “split” complex sandhi forms to facilitate reading and comprehension.

== Madras School Book Society ==
The Calcutta School-Book Society was established under the patronage of the Marquis of Hastings in 1817. Soon after a similar society was set up in Madras. The association in South India soon languished, and for many years it virtually ceased to exist. It was revived around 1850, when prizes were offered for the best school book on specified subjects. Several new publications were thus secured of which, The History of India by H. Morris Esq., was very successful.

The publications of the Madras School Book Society being chiefly used in Government Schools such that religious sentiments were adapted accordingly. The committee of the Madras Tract Society issued some books with Christian elements intended specially for mission schools Classified catalogue of Tamil printed books, with introductory notices. Though reading books of the Madras School Book society were prepared with special reference to the government schools, the committee was not restricted to non–Christian publications. The Rev. A.R. Symonds suggested that the society should make an effort to provide wholesome and attractive literature. Prizes were also offered for the best translation of Robinson Crusoe.

== Printing in Sri Lanka ==
Sheikh Mustafa from Beruwala who published his work 'Mizan Malai' Arwi poem book in 1868.

== Vepery Press ==
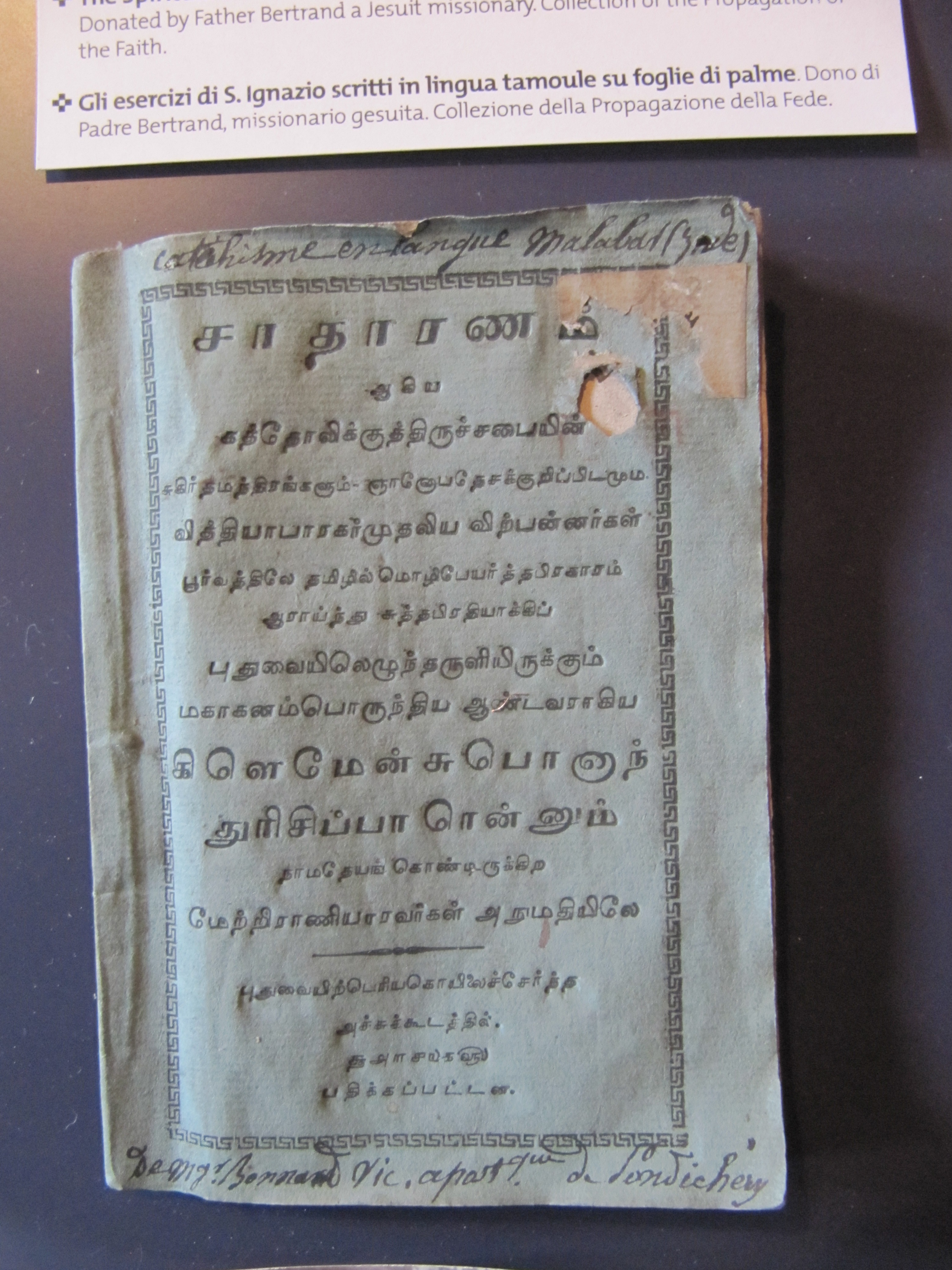
Catechism book printed in Pondicherry Mission Press. 1841 A.D

Madras was the foremost seat of printing among the “colonial metropolises”. The Society for Promoting Christian Knowledge (SPCK) was set up at Vepery (situated just outside Madras) in 1726 by Benjamin Schultz. This new venture (Vepery mission) was just an extension of the Tranquebar mission. Earlier in 1712, a printing press enabled with Tamil and Telugu typefaces was provided by the SPCK for publishing activities at Tranquebar, on repeated appeals by Ziegenbalg. This press mostly dealt with smaller publications like A General Description Of Malabar Heathendom, Four Gospels And Acts, and Accursed Heathendom which were usually antagonistic to Hindu beliefs and principles. It also printed the translated version of the New Testament in 1715. When the English army under Sir Eyre Coote attacked the French colony of Pondicherry in 1761 they seized the printing press from the governor's house along with its typefaces (which were a “prize catch” for them) and the printer, Delon and transferred it to Madras. Nonetheless Johann Phillip Fabricius, a well-known Tamil scholar convinced Coote to hand over the press, only on agreement that the printing demands of Fort St. George would be given maximum importance. In 1762 itself, the SPCK press published a calendar and several Tamil books, “pre-dating the books printed in Calcutta and Bombay at least by a decade”.

By 1766, Vepery got its own press supplemented with its own print equipment. Therefore, the presses confiscated from Pondicherry were returned to Fort St George, which led to the establishment of the Government Press in Mount Road. The Vepery Press was renamed as the SPCK Press; Johann Philipp Fabricius being its managerial head, who composed and printed a Tamil book on Catechism (1766) with typefaces cut in Germany (Halle). By the next decade typecases were produced by the SPCK Press itself and they lasted until the 1870s. Books printed included Fabricius's Translation of the New Testament (1772); his Dictionary of Tamil and English, based on Ziegenbalg's Malabar English Dictionary(1779) which came out 100 years after Antão da Proença's Tamil-Portuguese Dictionary of 1679; and Oru Paratecyin Punyacaritram (a translation of Bunyan's Pilgrims Progress (1793). This press was sold to the American Board of Commissioners for Foreign Missions (the American Board Mission or ABM) in Çintadaripet in the mid 19th century. When the ABM left India in 1886 the press was reacquired by the SPCK–Diocesan committee and renamed the Diocesan Press that still exists today, almost 250 years later, as the CLS Press.
