= Henrique Henriques =

Padre Henrique Henriques SJ
- Church: Catholic Church: Franciscan (till 1545); Society of Jesus (1545-1600)

Personal details
- Born: Anrique Anriquez; 1520 Vila Viçosa, Alentejo, Kingdom of Portugal
- Died: 6 February 1600 (aged 79–80) Punicale, Portuguese India (now Punnaikayal, Thoothukudi district, Tamil Nadu, India)
- Buried: Our Lady of Snows Basilica, Thoothukudi, Tamil Nadu, India
- Occupation: Jesuit priest, missionary, theological author, translator
- Education: Canon Law
- Alma mater: University of Coimbra, Portugal

Henrique Henriques (also known as Anrique Anriquez) (1520–1600) was a Portuguese Jesuit priest and missionary who spent most of his life in missionary activities in South India. After his initial years in Goa he moved to Tamil Nadu where he mastered Tamil and wrote several books including a dictionary. He is considered to be the first European Tamil scholar.

He strongly believed that books of religious doctrines should be in local languages and to this end he wrote books in Tamil. His efforts made Tamil the first non-European language to be printed in moveable type. Hence he is sometimes called The Father of the Tamil Press. After his death his mortal remains were buried in Our Lady of Snows Basilica in Thoothukudi, Tamil Nadu.

== Early life ==
Henriques was born into a Sephardi Jewish family in 1520 in Vila Viçosa, Alentejo, Kingdom of Portugal. He joined the Franciscan order but had to leave due to his Jewish ancestry. He later studied Canon Law at the University of Coimbra until 1545. On 7 October 1545, he entered the newly founded Society of Jesus in Coimbra (Portugal). He departed for India in 1546.

== Missionary in India ==
Henriques initially lived in Portuguese Goa until 1557 and then moved to the Pearl Fishery Coast or Tuticorin, under orders of St. Francis Xavier, where he worked as a missionary from 1547 to 1549. In 1549, after the death of Antonio Criminali, he was elected superior of this mission, a post which he held until 1576. His progress in the development of the community and his concerns about the problems in the mission are explicit from the regular reports he wrote to his Superior General.

== Printing in India ==
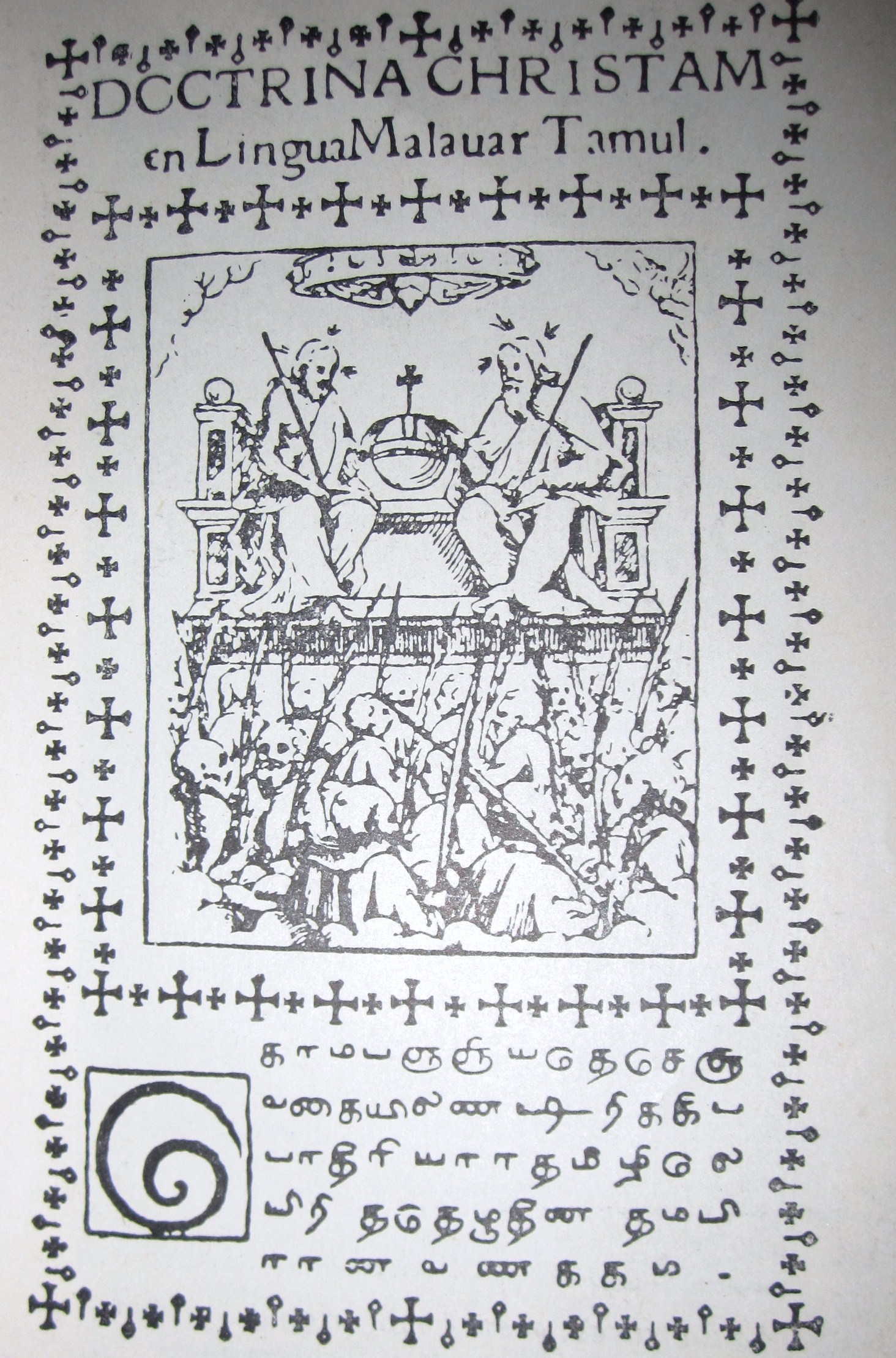
Thambiran Vanakkam

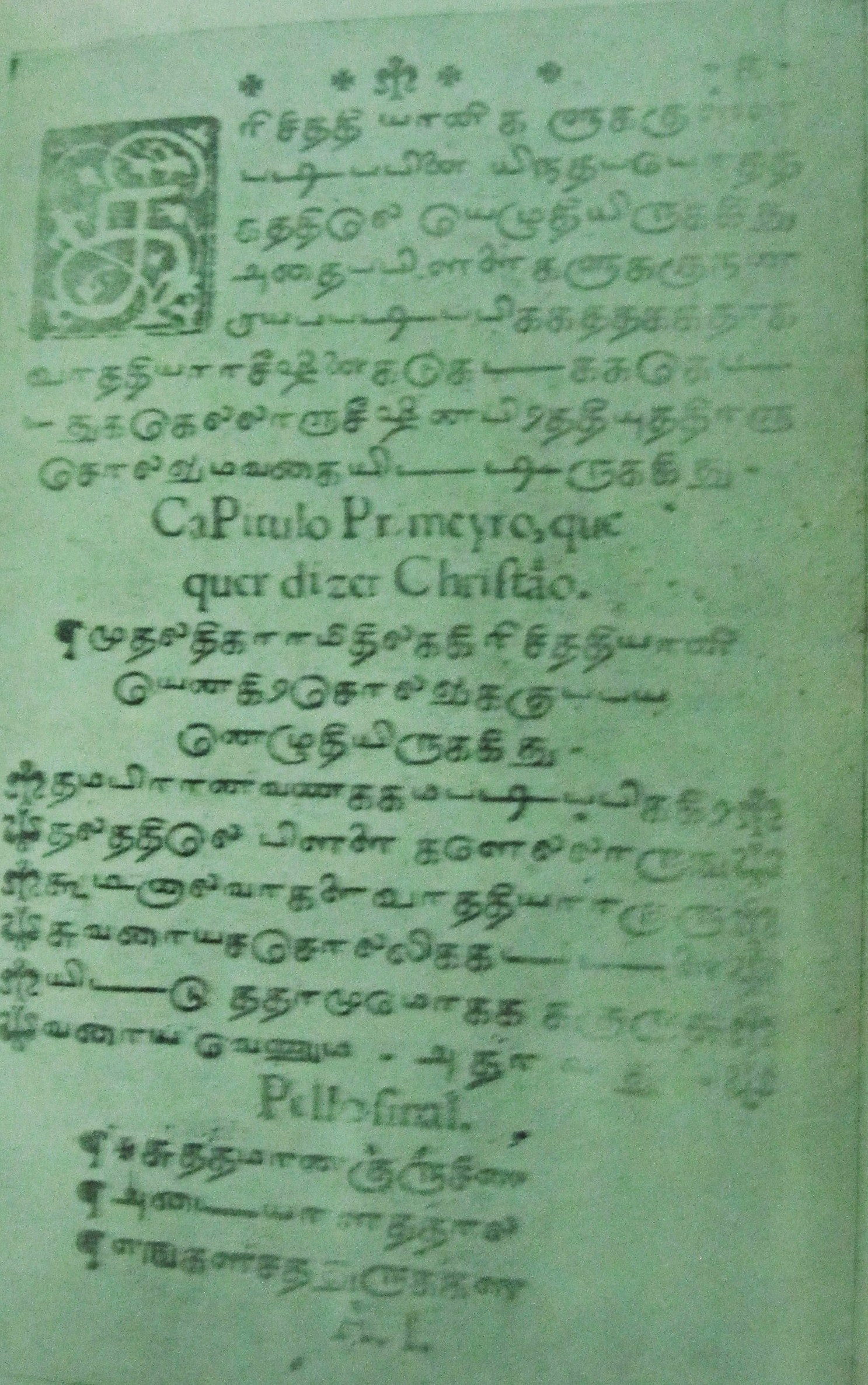
Kirisithiyaani Vanakkam

Henriques strongly felt that the mission could only be successful through the use of local languages. To this end he arranged for the printing of books on Christian doctrine in Tamil. Apart from being the first to produce a Tamil-Portuguese Dictionary, he set up the first Tamil press and printed books in Tamil script. The first such book printed in Tamil script was Thambiran Vanakkam (தம்பிரான் வணக்கம்) (1578), a 16-page translation of the Portuguese "Doctrina Christam", printed at Quilon(Kollam). It was followed by Kirisithiyaani Vanakkam (கிரிசித்தியானி வணக்கம்)(1579). These were works of catechism, containing the basic prayers of Catholicism. Before this 'Cartilha', a Tamil prayer book printed using Latin script, was printed in Lisbon by command of the Portuguese king and financed by the Paravars of Tuticorin who also helped with scholarly assistance.

He also printed Flos Sanctorum in Tamil (1586). This book contains the lives of Saints. By his efforts, Tamil became the first non-European language to be printed on a printing press. Hence, he is sometimes referred to as Father of the Tamil press

Henriques is the first known European Tamil scholar. Some of his works in the Malabar (Malauar) language (that is, Tamil) are no longer extant, including a work on grammar, a dictionary, a booklet for confession and a religious history from the Creation to the Ascension.

== Death ==
Henriques died on 22 February 1600 in a village named Punicale (now Punnaikayal in Thoothukudi district, Tamil Nadu). According to The Jesuit Annual Letter for 1601

...on the day he died all the Muslims of the neighbouring village Patanam (Kayalpattanam) fasted; the Hindus also of the neighbouring places fasted two days and closed all their shops and bazaars to express their grief over the death of the good and holy old man. So great was the respect and consideration every one had concerning his holiness.

His mortal remains were buried in Our Lady of Snows Basilica in Thoothukudi, Tamil Nadu.

== Works ==
- 1578: Doctrina Christam en Linga Malauar Tamul / Doctrina Cristaã tresladada em lingua Tamul [...]. Impressa em Coulam no Collegio do Saluador. — Only known copy: Houghton Library, Harvard University, GEN Typ 100 578 (digital copy)
- 1579: Doctrina Christaã, a maneyra de Dialogo [...]. Em Cochim, no Collegio da Madre de Deos. — Known copies: Sorbonne Université (digital copy, original lost), Bodleian Library
- 1580: Confessionairo. — Known copies: Bodleian Library, Vet. Or. f. Tam. 1., Moscow State University Library.
- 1586: [Flos sanctorum]. — Known copies: Biblioteca Apostolica Vaticana, Vat.ind.24 (digital copy), Royal Danish Library

== See also ==
- Printing in Goa
- Printing in Tamil language
- Statue of Our Lady of Miracles, Jaffna patao
