= Saint Liberata =

Saint Liberata may refer to:

- The French name for Saint Wilgefortis
- One of the sisters of St. Marina of Aguas Santas
- Italian name for Saint Adele, daughter of King Dagobert II
- Saint Liberata (Como), the sister of Saint Faustina, 6th century foundress of that town's convent
- Saint Liberata (Pizzone), the patron saint of Pizzone, Italy
