= Maranchon Wind Farm =

Wind farm in Spain

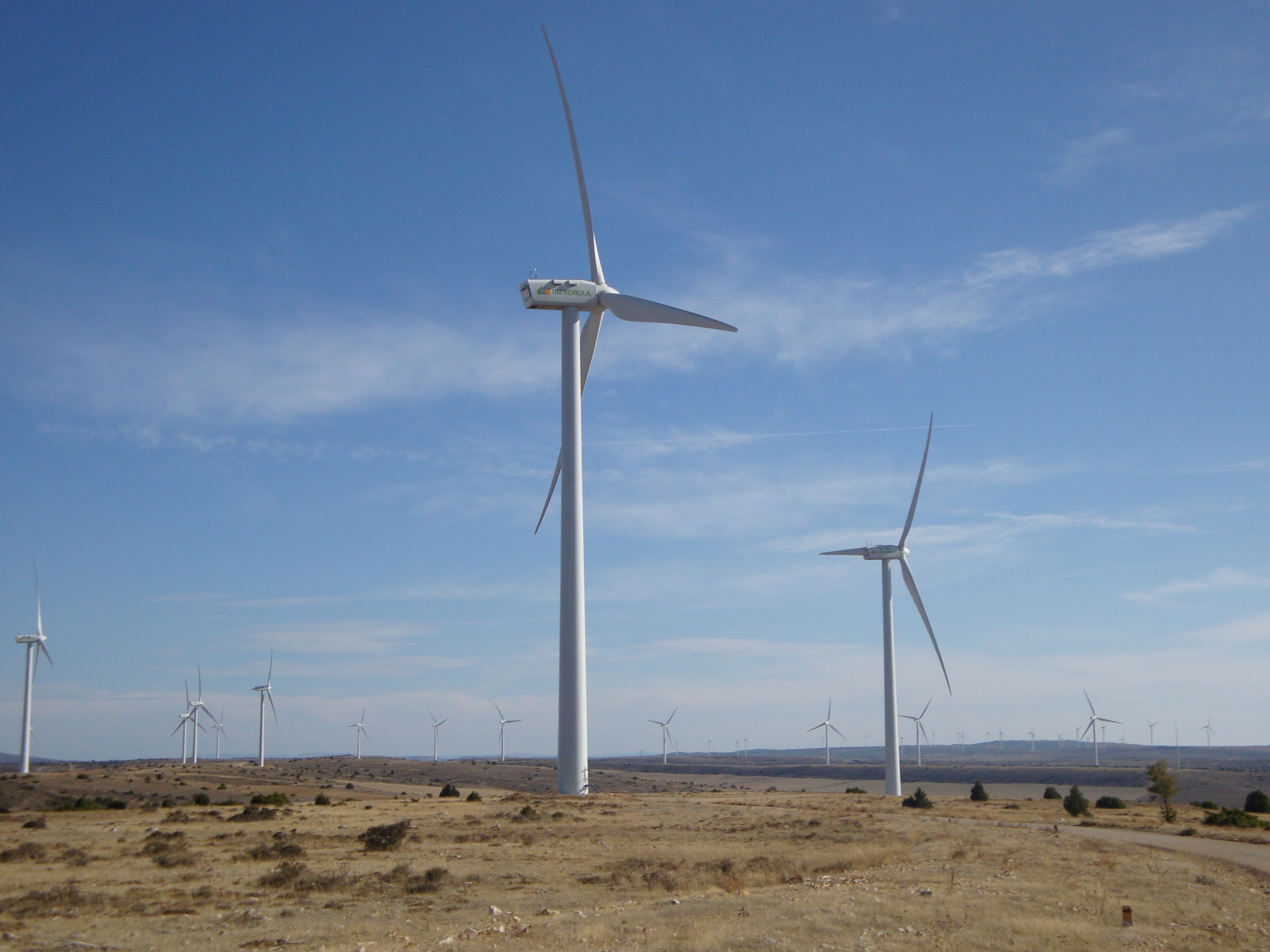
- Country: Spain
- Coordinates: 41°03′N 2°14′W
- Owner: Iberdrola
- Operator: Iberdrola Renovables

External links
- Commons: Related media on Commons

Maranchon Wind Farm is located in Maranchón, Guadalajara, Spain. The "Maranchon Complex", as it is called, actually consists of seven smaller wind parks with a total capacity of 208 MW, and it was the largest in Europe for some time. It is owned by Iberdrola and was dedicated in May 2006.

== See also ==
- Wind power in Spain
