= Heinz Baumann (priest) =

German Roman-Catholic priest

- Born: Heinz Hubert Baumann; 11 December 1946; Barmen, Germany
- Died: 24 April 2010 (aged 63); Germany
- Burial place: Barmen, Germany
- Other names: Known nicknames in some groups (unofficial): "Don", "The Pope". Misnamed in a former web publication about Haaren: "Hugo Baumann". Misnamed in one obituary: "H.-Hubert Baumann"
- Predecessor: Ferdinand Lenßen
- Successor: Lukas Jünemann
- Awards: 1972: Närrischer Ratsherr KG Närrische Nord Dürener e.V. 1966. 1993: Mullefluppet. 19??: Silver needle of honor of 1. FC Köln.
- Years active: 1972–2009

Ecclesiastical career
- Religion: Christianity
- Church: Roman Catholic Church
- Ordained: 17 June 1972
- Congregations served: St. Marien, Aachen; St. Jakob, Aachen; St. Elisabeth, Aachen-North (1979-2009)

Heinz Hubert Baumann (11 December 1946 – 24 April 2010) was a German Roman-Catholic priest in Aachen.

== Life ==
Heinz Baumann grew up as the first son of August and Agnes Baumann in Jülich-Barmen and attended the humanities-oriented gymnasium Haus Overbach. There he came into contact with the teachings of Francis de Sales and early on developed the desire to become a priest. After graduating in 1966, he studied philosophy and theology in Bonn and Tübingen under Hans Küng and Joseph Ratzinger and was ordained as a priest on 17 June 1972 in Krefeld. After a few years as a chaplain at the Aachen parishes of St. Marien and St. Jakob he moved to St. Elisabeth in the district Aachen-North on 2 April 1979. On 29 December 1981 (with effect from 1 January 1982) bishop Klaus Hemmerle appointed him to become the successor of Ferdinand Lenßen as pastor of St. Elisabeth. He was introduced into his duties on 17 January 1982. At the end of 1998, Heinz Baumann fell seriously ill for about seven months. After his recovery and return he continued to lead the parish until 2009. He died from illness on 24 April 2010. His grave is located in his birthplace Barmen.

== Work ==
Baumann wanted to see church as a meeting place widely open for anyone and beyond confessional borders. He typically tried to convince people with deeds rather than words and to thereby encourage imitation. He was motivated by a deep belief and commitment to social justice, reflected in a multitude of projects, events and long-term established facilities. Besides his child and youth work he helped long-term unemployed people (f.e. by the creation of an unemployment center), drug addicts, and he supported the peace movement, cross-cultural communication and intercultural exchange. He also encouraged people to take over responsibility and initiative themselves.

Let us preach more through our lives than with words.

— Heinz Baumann inspired by Francis of Assisi in a sermon in 1982

While to him working with the youth had the highest priority he also continued to maintain already established initiatives such as the "Elisabeth Conference", a program originally founded in 1908 to support poor people, and among them especially elderly women and, increasingly, single mothers. Between 1989 and 2004 he set up a clothing store for people in need. In 1991, he helped set up a library open to everyone. He also initiated a local newspaper.

Between 1991 and 1994, a nationwide exchange program took place under the name "Elisabethtreffen" between German St. Elisabeth parishes. More than one hundred pupils from cities such as Bottrop, Eisenach, Aachen and Königs-Wusterhausen participated in this program.

Gifted with a certain kind of wit, Baumann became known to also take unconventional and sometimes odd measures to support people in need. He actively participated in many social-political discussions and was not shy to exchange even vehement arguments with superiors inside and outside the church.

Open also to worldly amusements, Baumann was guided by his insight: "Jesus must have been a happy person, why else would he have turned water into wine?" For example, he was a member of the traditional 'Mai Club' in Barmen and honoured member of the carneval society 'KG Närrische Nord Dürener e.V. 1966'.

From 1990 on he repeatedly celebrated holy masses in the circus tent of the Circus Roncalli whenever they came around to visit Aachen on their journey.

The vicinity of the parish church of St. Elisabeth being located at the Blücherplatz, one of Aachen's important traffic hubs with the nearby Europaplatz, was utilized by Baumann for large-scale admonishing banners mounted on the building's facade and fencing in order to spread the message and draw attention from motorists and passers-by to global ills as well as to local activities and to ask for help and commitment.

Since 1994 on the occasion of the annual World Animal Day he carried out animal blessings of domestic animals in memory of Francis of Assisi.

Being a passionate football fan since his youth, Baumann officially looked after the team of the 1. FC Köln pastorally, an initiative originally started in 1991 when he supported the players in the struggles after the accidental death of the German Bundesliga player Maurice Banach. Over time he thereby became known as "FC pastor" nationally.

As a diocesan minister, he led seminars and workshops on intergenerationality in the Maria Laach Abbey. In addition, he was deputy federal praeses of the federal association of Catholic male communities and men's facility in Germany.

In 1993, Baumann was awarded the Mullefluppet prize of the Zeitungsverlag Aachen for demonstrating virtues such as helpfulness, humor, repartee, originality and passion for Aachen.

Heinz Baumann inspired the German artist Günther Beckers to create several portraits, some of which could be seen posthumously f.e. in the 2012 exhibition "Fanum Profanum".

From 2002, he fought to continue the social services for young people and to keep the unemployment center open against austerity and closure intentions imposed by his superiors. He also advocated for employees threatened with redundancies, including offering parts of his own salary. At the same time Baumann tried to save costs and increase the attractiveness of the church by moving parts of the parish office into the church itself in 2002 (project "Schreibtisch in der Kirche", engl. "Desk in the church") so that the church could open to visitors also in the mornings. In 2003, further ideas for new usage concepts were presented. In 2005, this led to redesigning the entrance area of the church, which now could be easily inspected from outside through a newly created window in order to remove threshold fears to enter the church from pedestrians in the streets. The parish office was relocated into there and combined with a café meeting point open to anyone.

In parallel, in 2004/2005, Baumann personally supported the initiative of several pupils of the parish to repaint the entire interior of the church (project "Weiße Weihnacht", engl. "White Christmas") and arranged a holiday camp in Schonach im Schwarzwald. These flourishing contacts resulted in that he was asked to inaugurate their local Bruder-Klaus-Kapelle (engl. 'Brother Klaus Chapel') in July 2008.

== See also ==
- Heinrich Mussinghoff
- Giovanni Melchiorre Bosco
- Salesians of Don Bosco (SDB)
- Pastor Lenssen Polytechnic College (PLPC)
- Ignaci Siluvai
- Franz Meurer
- Künstlermuseum Beckers Böll
- Aachener Geschichtsverein (AGV)
