= Ignaci Siluvai =

Indian Roman-Catholic priest and educator

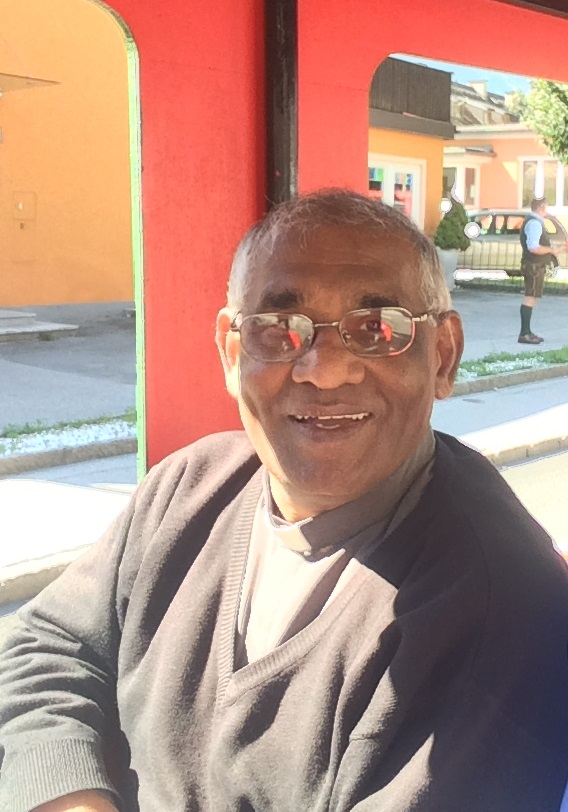
- Ignaci Siluvai in 2016
- Born: Ignaci Siluvai; 5 June 1947; Kuthenkully, India

Ignaci Siluvai (or Ignatius Siluvai, also Siluvai Ignaci) is an Indian priest and educator who established the Father Sebastian Educational and Charitable Trust and founded the Pastor Lenssen Polytechnic College (PLPC).

== Early life and background ==
Ignaci Siluvai was born in Kuthenkully of the diocese of Tuticorin, in the civil district of Tirunelveli, Tamil Nadu, India on 5 June 1947. He was ordained a priest for the diocese of Tuticorin on 22 July 1973. He obtained licentiate in philosophy from the Faculty of Philosophy, bachelor in theology from the Faculty of Theology and diploma in biblical philology from the Faculty of Letters of Catholic University of Leuven, Belgium (1966–1973) and obtained a licentiate in Sacred Scripture and a doctorate from the Pontifical Biblical Institute in Rome, Italy (1975–1981).

== Ministry and achievements ==
He has served as assistant parish priest and parish priest in various parishes in the diocese of Tuticorin, as secretary to bishop and assistant parish priest at the Cathedral (1973–1975), assistant director of St. Joseph's charity institute, Adaikalapuram and rector in-charge Christ Hall seminary, Karumathur (1982–1983), director of St. Ignatius Boys Home, Inigo Press, and St. Ignatius Industrial School, Tuticorin (1983–1987/1989?), (Note: 1983–1989 or 1987.) parish priest of St. Ignatius Parish, Innaciarpuram (1984–1989) as well as a parish priest of St. Joseph's Church in Kuttapuly (Note: Kuttapuly or Kootapuly.) (1990/1991? (Note: 1990 or 1991.)–1995), a small fishing village, where in 1991 he helped to build stone houses for the poor and in 1991/1992 built a larger school.

Supported by Aachen pastors Ferdinand Lenßen and Bernhard Kreutz, Siluvai moved to Germany in 1995, and worked as parish administrator in Hoengen, Süsterseel and Saeffelen (1995–1996) as well as a pastor at St. Lambertus in Randerath (Heinsberg) (June 1996 – 2000) of the diocese Aachen before he moved back to India on 27/28 February 2000.

For a long time Siluvai had a dream to uplift the rural youth in India knowing that education would be the only way to achieve the development of the youth personally at micro level and socially at a macro level. Aiming at this vision, he established the Father Sebastian Educational and Charitable Trust in 1997. Under this trust, he founded the Pastor Lenssen Polytechnic College on 31 January 1997. It is named after Ferdinand Lenßen, a former pastor of St. Elisabeth from Aachen as well as a friend and major supporter of the project, who had died a little bit earlier on 6 April 1996. It was partially opened in July 1999 and completed to suit 700 pupils on the 29 August 2001. He entrusted the administration to the Salesians of Don Bosco. On 2 August 2006 it was expanded to occupy up to 1000 pupils.

At the end of December 1999 he was appointed as the national director of the Pontifical Mission Societies (MISSIO) in India and continued as the director until 2011. He was conferred with Monsignor title (capellano del Santo Padre) on 16 November 2002.

Later he worked in Heidenfeld, Röthlein, Hirschfeld in the diocese of Würzburg (2011–2012) as well as a parish administrator in Bergheim, Bürmoos (2012–August 2013). He was appointed as a priest in the parish of St. Martin in Liefering (Salzburg) (September 2013 – 2015) of the archdiocese of Salzburg in Austria.

At present he serves as the parish priest of Schwarzach in Pongau, Austria and as spiritual director in the Kardinal Schwarzenberg Hospital in Schwarzach im Pongau.

== See also ==
- Heinz Hubert Baumann
