= Marina of Aguas Santas =

Spanish virgin martyr

Saint Marina of Aguas Santas
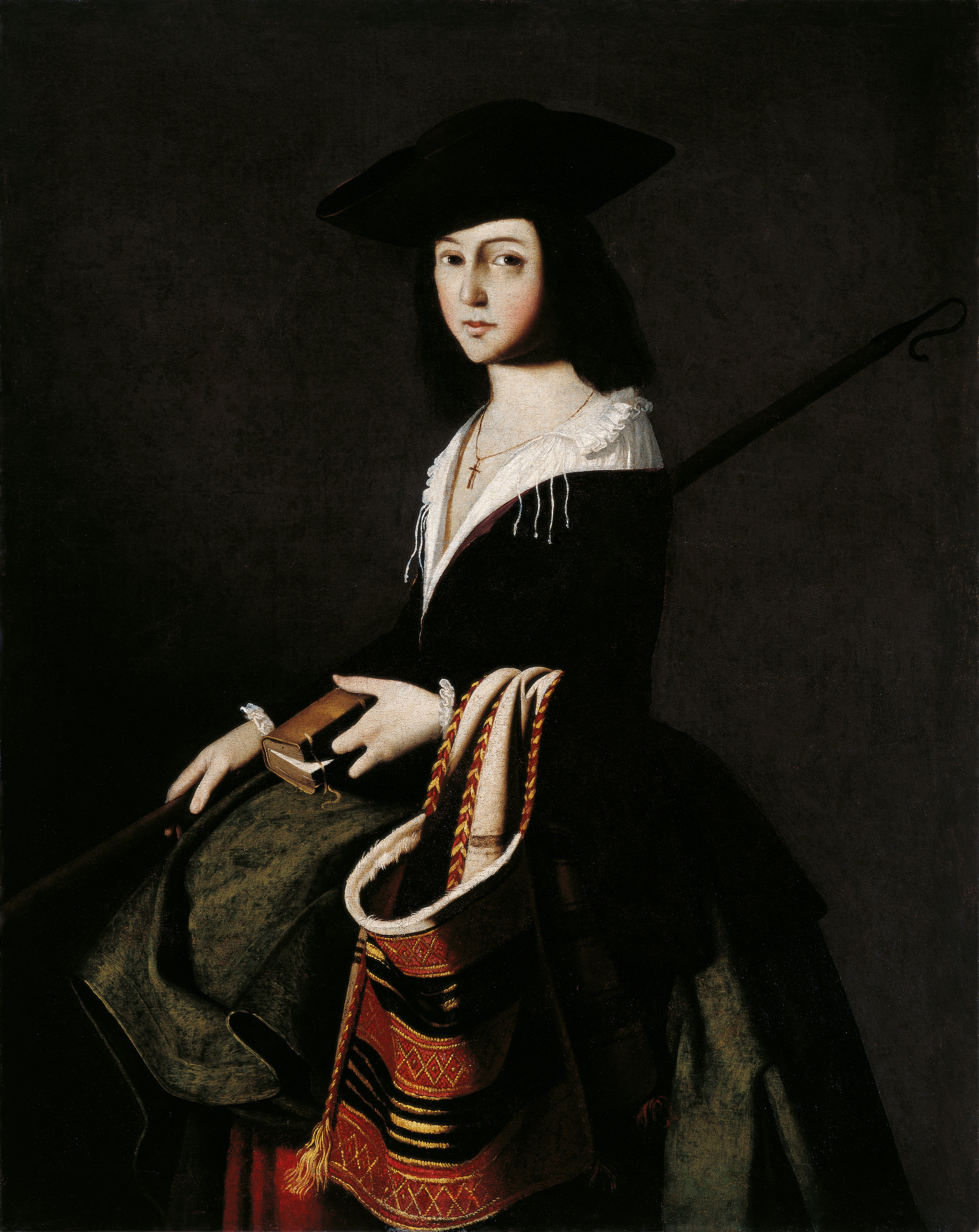
- Santa Marina, by Francisco de Zurbarán

Virgin and martyr
- Born: 119 AD
- Died: 139 AD
- Venerated in: Catholic Church
- Feast: July 18
- Patronage: Ourense

Marina of Aguas Santas (also Marina of Ourense) (c.120–135 AD) was a Christian virgin martyr from Aguas Santas, in the province of Ourense. The story of her life as it has been preserved is a mixture of fact and legends.

== Legend ==
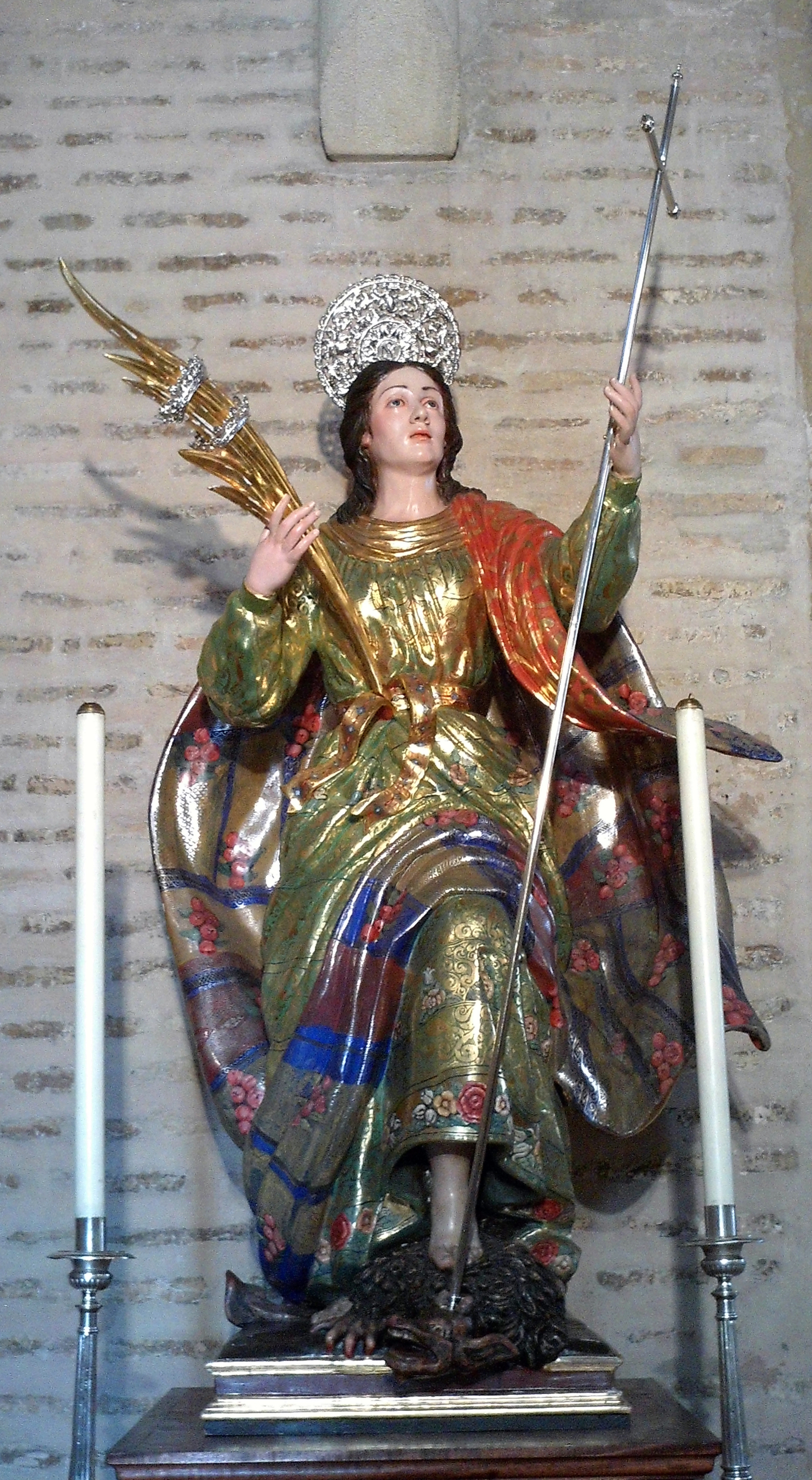
Santa Marina de Aguas Santas, Seville

The traditional account of the life of Santa Marina points to the town of Xinzo de Limia as the place of her birth. At that time, the region of La Limia was a highly Romanized town (Forum Limicorum), through which the Vía Nova, which linked the towns of Bracara (Braga, Portugal) and Asturica (Astorga), passed.

Her father, called Theudio or Teódulo, was a person of some importance; her mother, whose name is unknown, died in childbirth. Following the recommendations of the doctors, her father sought someone to be his daughter's nurse. He chose a woman named "Aya" from a farm in Pinnitus. The community was attended by the priest Teotimo. Educated by her nurse, within that community, she chose the Christian life and received baptism in the new faith, which causes an estrangement from her father Theudio, and his Roman views.

She lived the ordinary life of a rural household, dedicated to farming and grazing. One day when she was about fifteen years old, while she was minding the cattle, in a place near the road, the young Roman prefect Olibrio saw her by chance and was attracted to the beautiful stranger. He wished to make her a wife, concubine or slave, depending on her social status. Marina repeatedly refused his overtures and he decided to accuse her of being a Christian. She was imprisoned and subjected to various tortures.

Since the decree of Trajan was in force, the judges condemned her to die if she did not renounce her Christian beliefs. At the trial she neither denied her faith nor offered incense to the gods of Rome. She was condemned to death by beheading, as befitted a Roman citizen. She was taken to an open field the required distance from the town. When the executioner cut off her head, water flowed from where it touched the ground.

== Alternate account ==
She is also sometimes identified as one of nine sisters, including Quiteria and Liberata, said to have been born in Braga, Portugal) to Lucius Catilius Severus, Roman governor of Gallaecia and Lusitania, and Calcia, his wife. Calcia, frightened that her husband would interpret this multiple birth as a sign of infidelity, ordered her servant Sila to drown the girls in the Miñor River. Instead, Sila, secretly a Christian, left Calcia's daughters in the care of several families. Marina and her sisters were baptized by the Bishop of Braga Saint Ovidius (Ovidio) and brought up in the Christian faith.

When they were twenty, they were accused of being Christians and brought before their father the governor. He recognized them as his own daughters, and asked them to renounce their faith, promising them luxuries. The sisters refused and were imprisoned. They managed to escape and were ultimately martyred for their faith. A spring of water gushed out of the spot where they were beheaded; the spot was called Aguas Santas ("Holy Waters").

Some versions combine both stories.

== Veneration ==
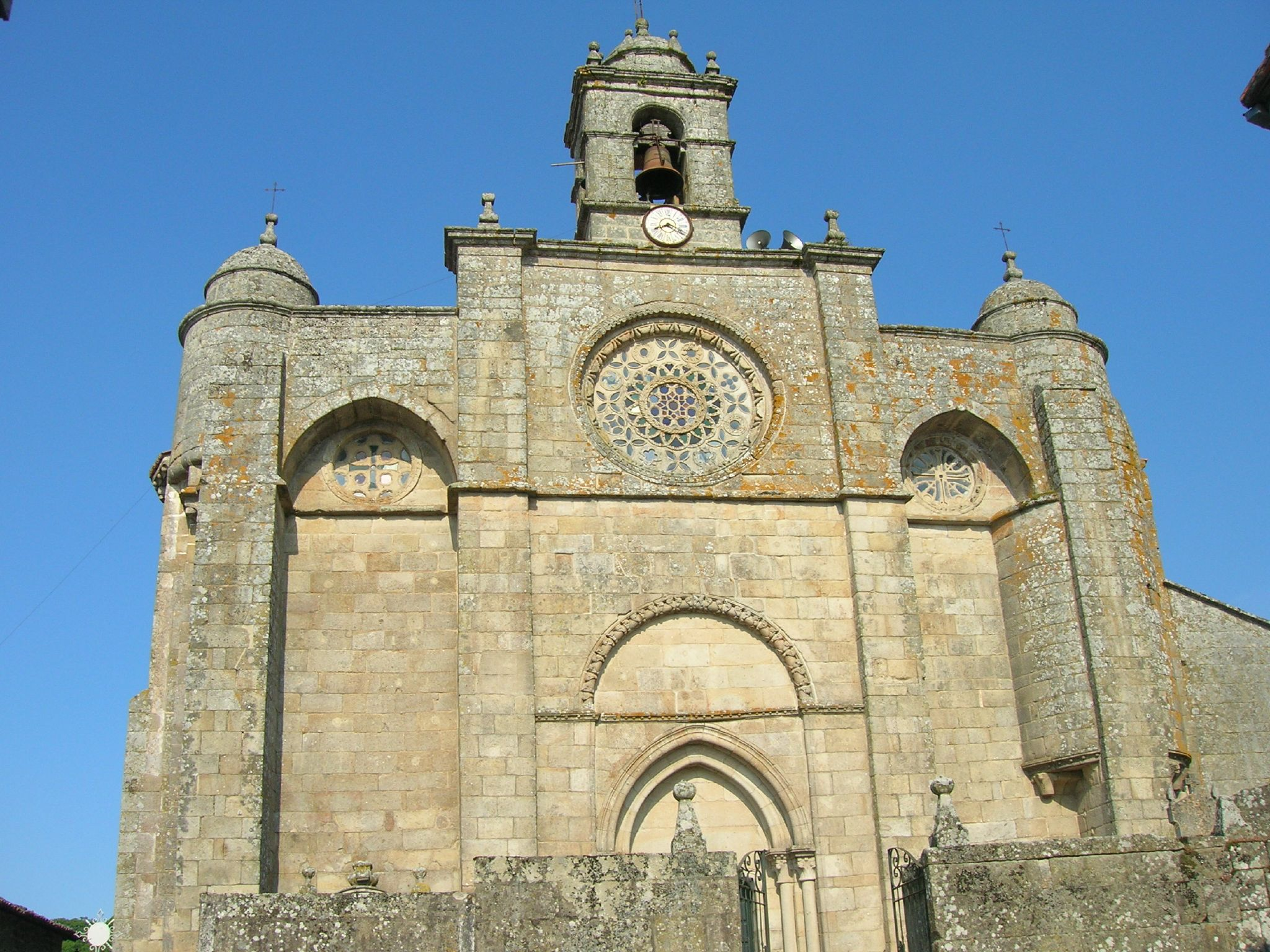
Igrexa de Santa Mariña de Augas Santas, Allariz

After the Edict of Milan (313), the burial site being near the Ribeira Sacra, it is probable that a group of anchorites or monks inhabited that place to preserve the memory of the saint and care for pilgrims to the martyr's tomb. Around the year 800, a cult began around the memory of Santa Marina that eventually resulted in the Romanesque edifice of the late twelfth century church of Santa Mariña de Aguas Santas, in Aguas Santas.

The friar and historian Juan Muñoz de la Cueva was an ardent protector of the cult of Marina of Aguas Santas, after consulting a manuscript by the friar Egidio de Zamora (13th century), who testified that the story of this saint was copied from a writing by the holy priest Teotimus, who is also cited by the Palencia breviary.

Marina would have suffered martyrdom in the vicinity of the city of Ourense, in the locality of Aguas Santas, where her remains are preserved in a church dedicated to her. The great diffusion of the cult is attested by the innumerable churches and sanctuaries dedicated to her in the dioceses of Galicia, Astorga, and in others more distant, such as Cordoba and Seville.

Baronius added her name to the Roman Martyrology of 1586, and since then her feast has been celebrated on July 18. The site remains a place of pilgrimage where the waters are believed to have healing properties.

However, there is no reliable information about the time or life of Marina. Her legend was sometimes also confused with that of Margaret of Antioch, who was sometimes also called Marina. She is no longer found in the present Roman Martyrology.

== Patronage ==
Marina of Aguas Santas is the patroness saint of Ourense. The Church of Santa Marina de Aguas Santas is located in the town of the same name, about 15 km from Ourense, not far from Allariz. It is believed that her relics lie there.

She is celebrated in Córdoba at the Parish of Santa Marina de Aguas Santas. A church is dedicated to her in Fernán Núñez.

She is also the patroness saint of the Portuguese parish of Santa Marinha e São Pedro da Afurada in Vila Nova de Gaia.

In Spain she is celebrated in Aracaldo (Vizcaya), Escurial de la Sierra, El Collado, Villarcayo de Merindad de Castilla la Vieja, Villandiego, Castrillejo de la Olma, Magán, Fontihoyuelo, Cigales, Izagre, Rabé de las Calzadas, Valverde de Mérida (Badajoz), and Buelna (Llanes-Asturias).

In Galicia, there are many parishes that venerate her, such as Carracedo, in the municipality of Caldas de Reyes; she is also the patroness saint of the municipalities of Rubiá, Teo, Ginzo de Limia, Cambados, Las Nieves and Maroñas.

In Asturias, she is the patroness saint of the village of Andeyes and in Aragon in the chapel of Santa Marina in Estopiñán del Castillo. In the city of Seville, on San Luis street, is the Church of Santa Marina, built in the thirteenth century in Gothic-Mudejar style.

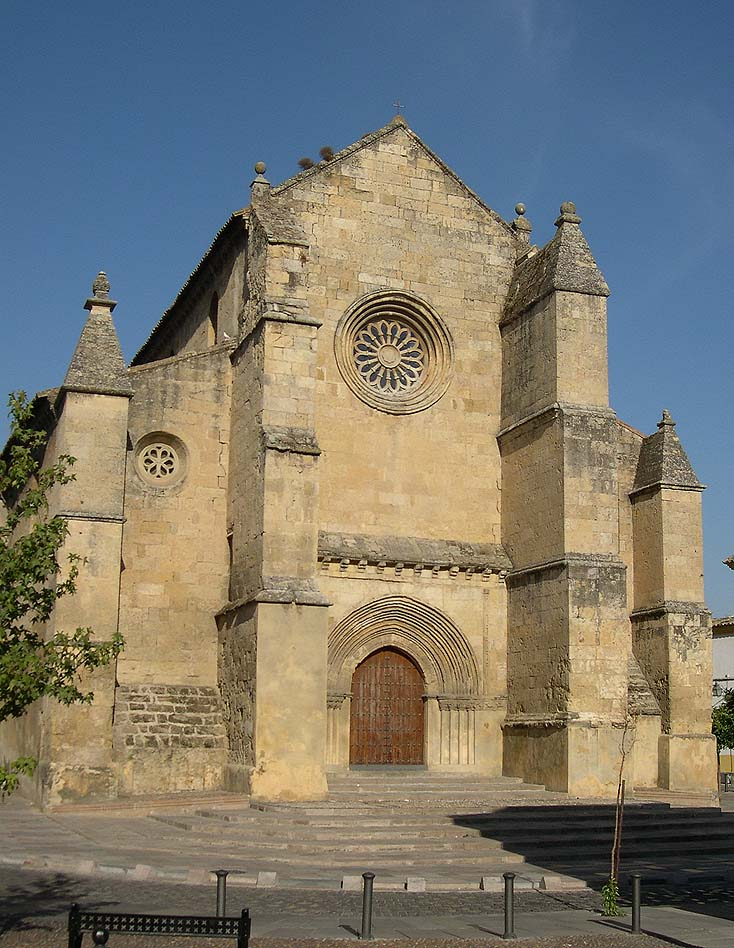
Church of Santa Marina, Córdoba.

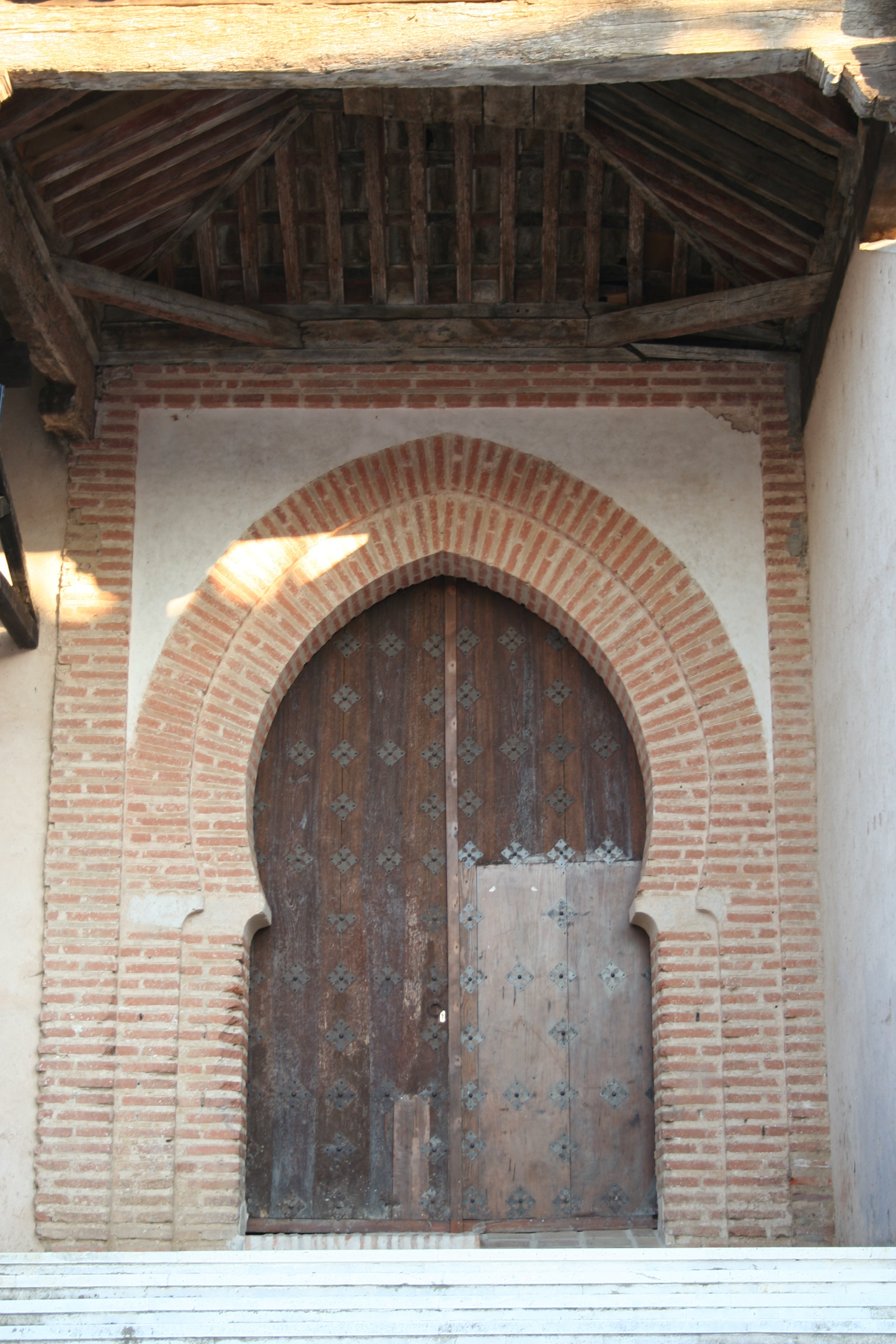
Church of Santa Marina, Mayorga.

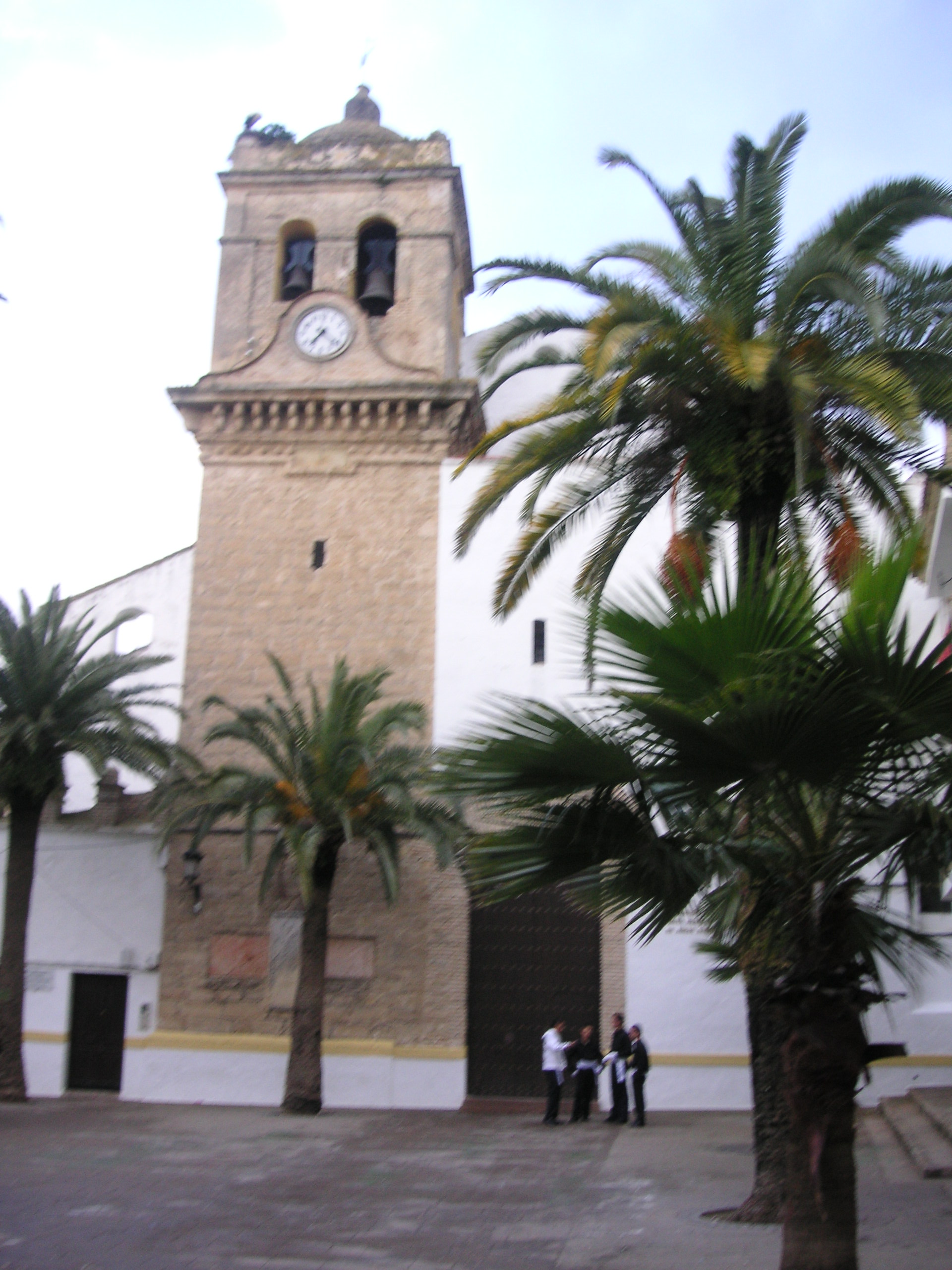
Iglesia de Santa Marina in Fernán Núñez
