= Circus Roncalli =

German circus

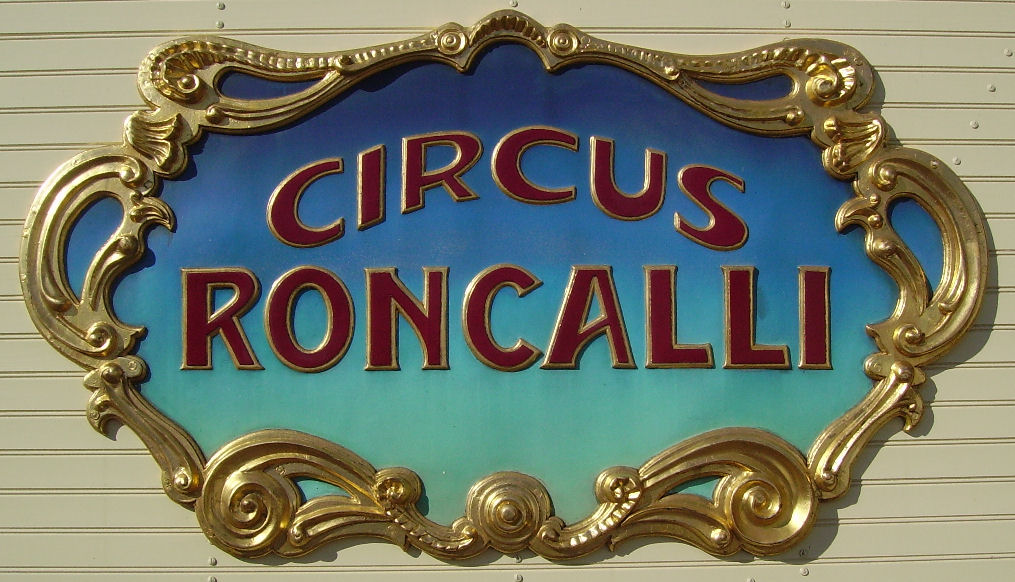
- Type: Circus
- Founded: 1976
- Founder: Bernhard Paul and André Heller
- Headquarters: Hamburg, Germany
- Key people: Bernhard Paul (CEO) Lili Paul-Roncalli (Executive, Heiress)
- Operating income: $ 25 Million
- Net income: $ 27 Million
- Website: roncalli.de

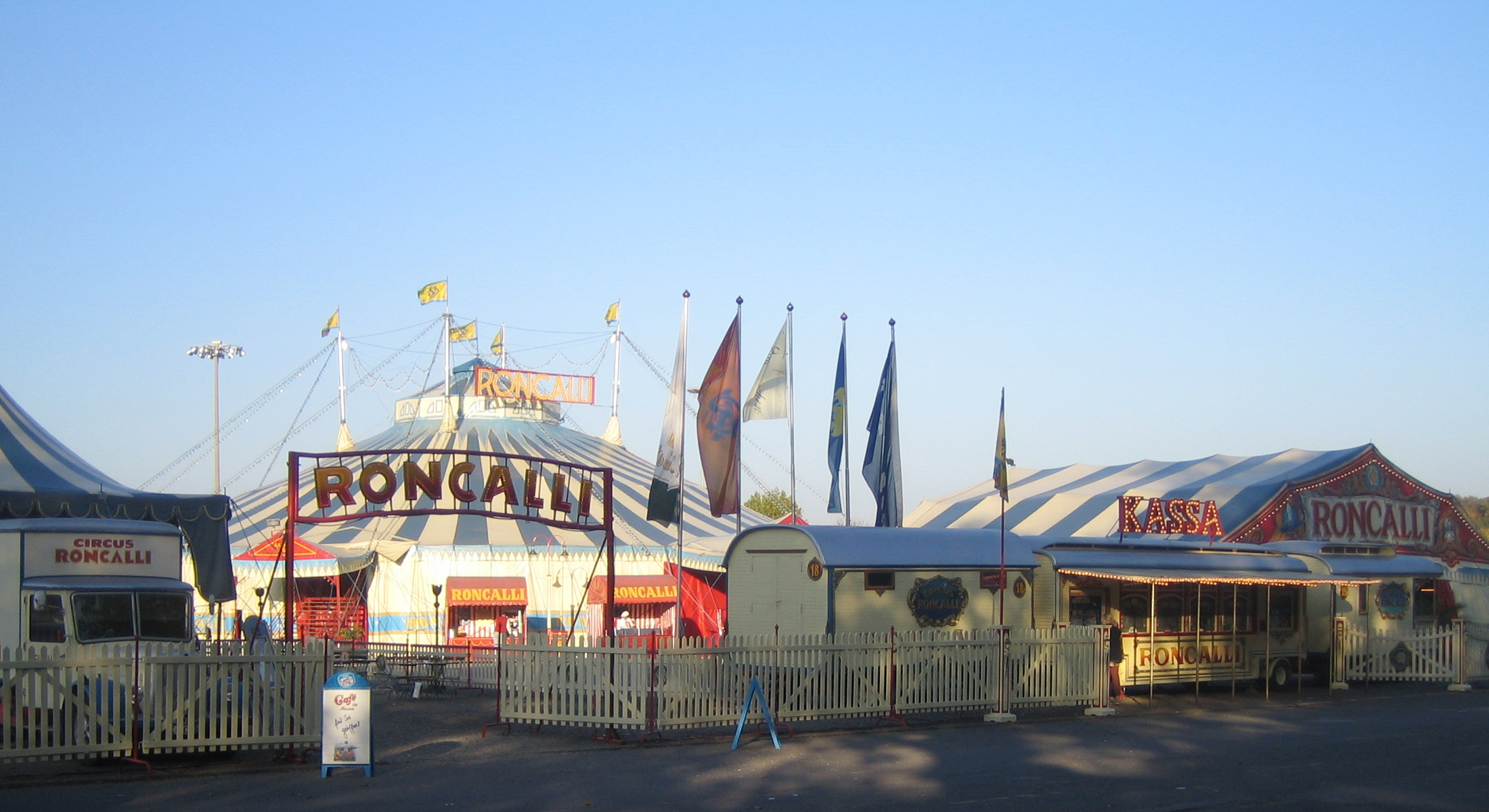
Circus Roncalli (2005)

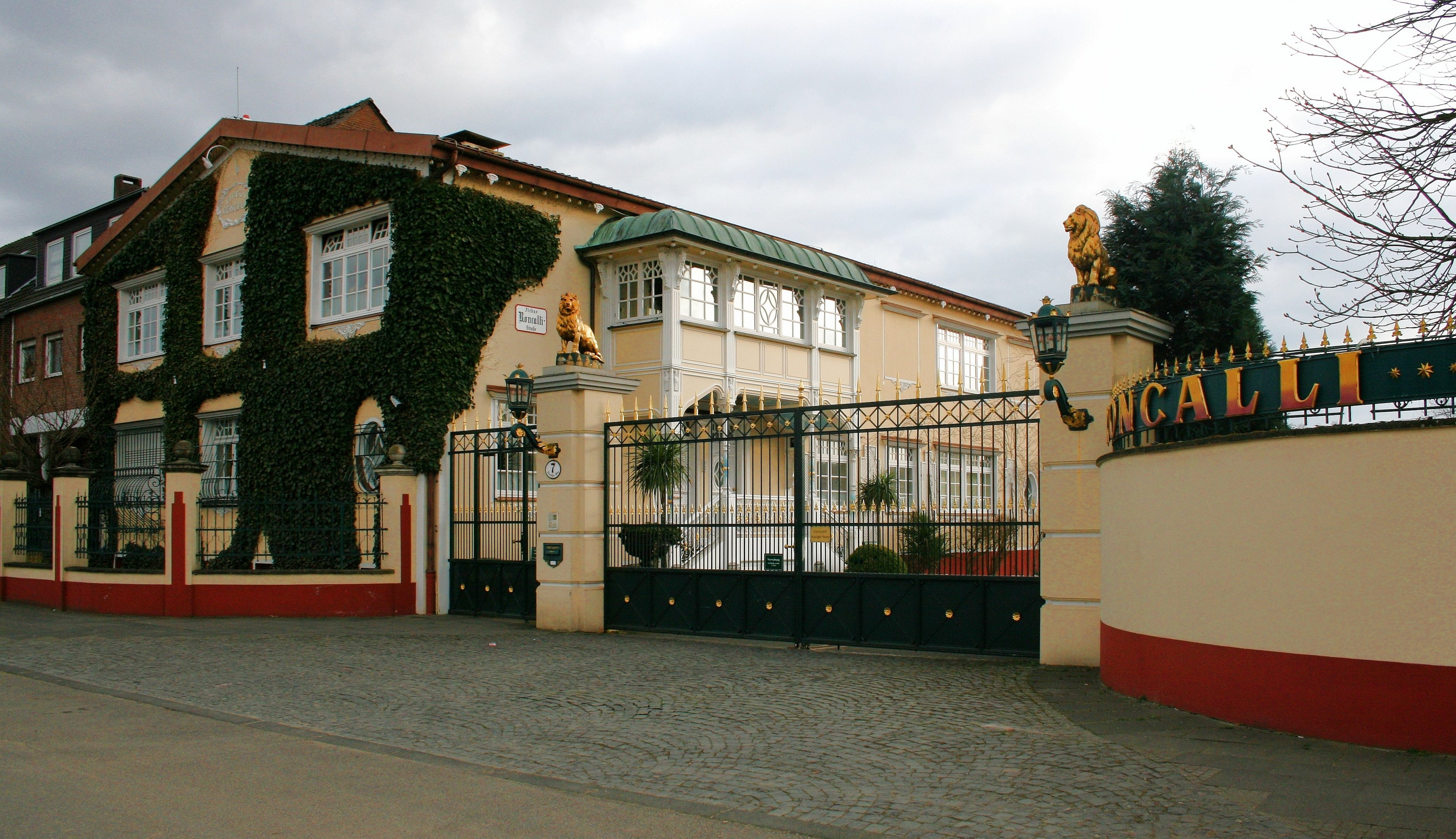
Winter quarters in Mülheim, Cologne (2009)

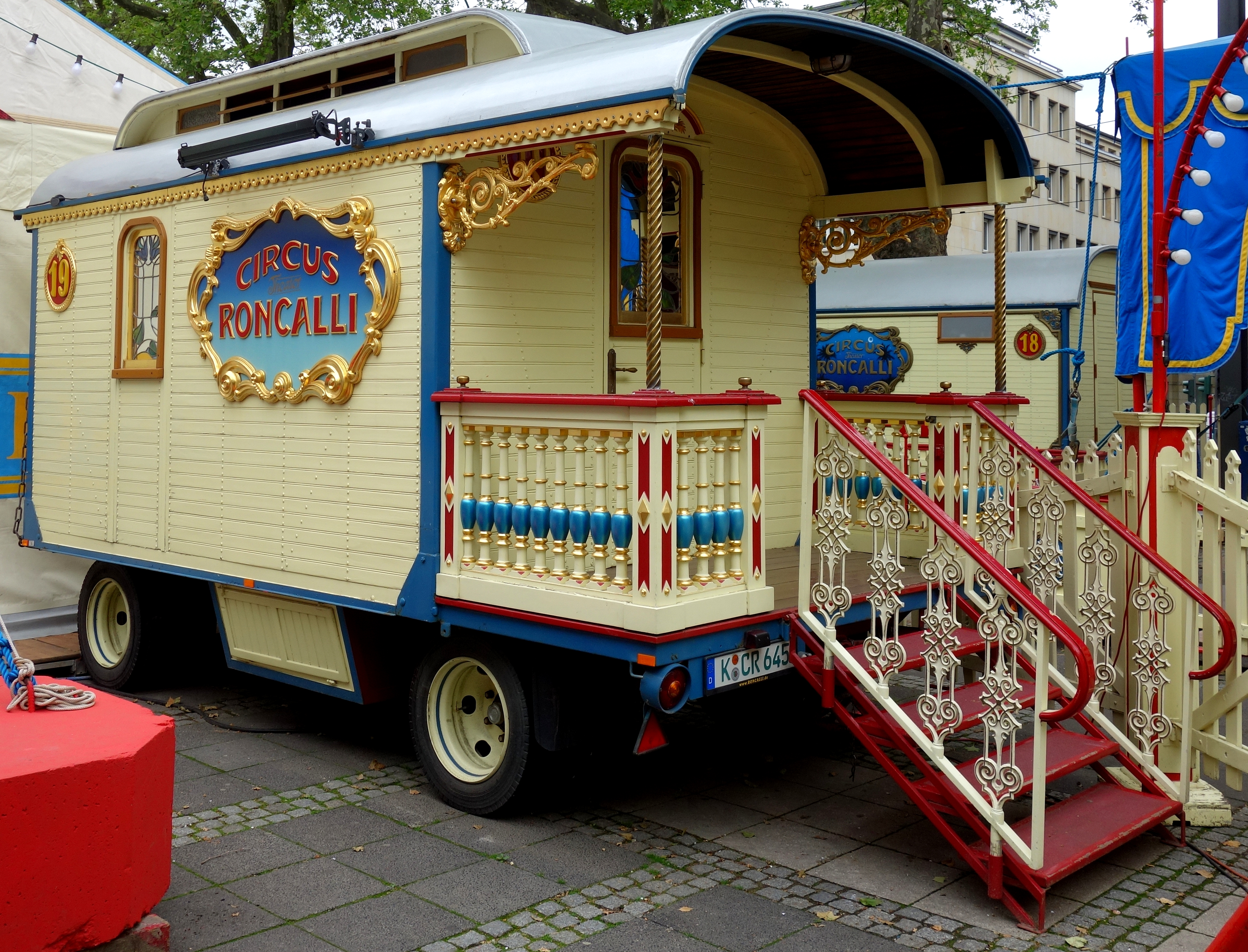
Vintage circus wagon

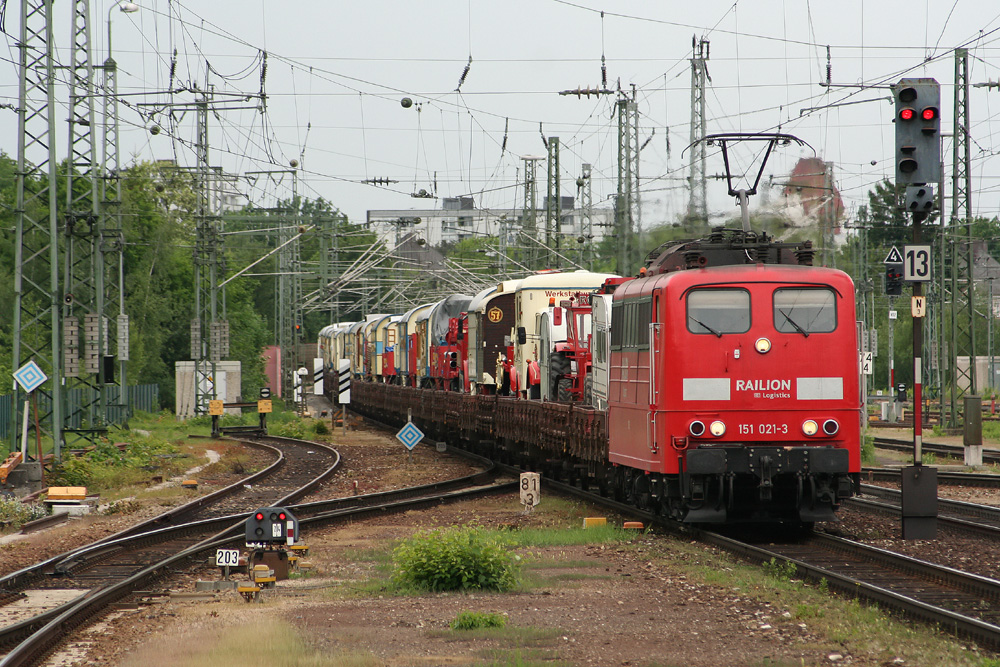
Circus Roncalli being transported by rail

Circus Roncalli is a German professional circus founded in 1976 by Bernhard Paul and André Heller. According to Paul, the name was suggested by fellow Austrian Peter Hajek and his film script Sarah Roncalli, Tochter des Mondes [Sarah Roncalli, Daughter of the Moon], named after Pope John XXIII whose civil name was Angelo Giuseppe Roncalli. Paul and Heller agreed because of its pleasant sound and the pope's reform agenda.

== History ==
The first performance of the circus was on 18 May 1976 on the Hofgartenwiese in Bonn, and the tour finished on 16 August 1976 in Munich. After the first season, Paul and Heller disagreed about the concept and rights, so that at a future performance on 4 June 1980 in Cologne, Bernhard Paul directed the circus on his own. (In September 1976 there were already performances without Heller in Vienna, but the show closed after a short run owing to a dwindling audience.) Since then, the circus has toured in Germany and abroad, including the first appearance of a West German circus in the Soviet Union in 1986. Model-turned-photographer Ellen von Unwerth worked as an assistant at Circus Roncalli in Munich for around a month when she was eighteen years old.

== Winter quarters ==
The winter quarters of the circus have been at Neurather Weg 7 in Mülheim, Cologne, since 1984. The building belonged to Circus Williams previously, and was rebuilt to accommodate Circus Roncalli, and then was officially opened on 27 April 1986.

== Roncalli Museum ==
Bernhard Paul owns one of the largest circus collections in Europe, including old costumes, circus books and posters, which he plans to display in a museum.

== Projects ==
Circus Roncalli has taken part in a number of projects:

- The "Höhner rockin Roncalli Show" – Tours with the musical group De Höhner.
- "Circus meets Classic" – Performances by artists based on classical music performed by various symphony orchestras.
- Since 2003, Circus Roncalli has collaborated with the Deutsches Symphonie-Orchester Berlin in annual New Year’s concerts, presenting poetic circus artistry accompanied by live orchestral music.
- Performances with the musical group the Kelly Family in 2003 and 2004 (Phantasie verboten), and in 2005 and 2006 ("Music meets Circus – Circus meets Music").
- A Christmas circus (Roncalli Weihnachtscircus), which has been held in the Tempodrom in Berlin from December to January since 2004
- The dinner show "Witzigmann & Roncalli Bajazzo", together with Eckart Witzigmann since autumn 2006
- A historical Christmas market in front of the Hamburg Rathaus.

== Family ==
Bernhard's youngest daughter Lili is the heiress to the multi-million euro circus empire.

== See also ==
- Heinz Baumann (priest) who celebrated mass in the tent
