= Santa Quiteria, Higueruela =

Neoclassic Catholic church

Santa Quiteria is a Neoclassic, Roman Catholic parish church in Higueruela, province of Albacete, Community of Castile-La Mancha, Spain.

A hermitage of the same dedication is known from 1592. The church was erected in the 18th century, using designs of Don Lorenzo Alonso Franco, who also created the parish churches in Fuenteálamo, Pétrola and Carcelén. He also worked on the façade of the Tower of Alcalá, and on the remodeling of Santa María del Salvador of Chinchilla.

In the crossing spandrels are depictions of the four evangelists. Inside there is also a San Antonio de Padua by Roque López and an icon of Santa Quiteria “La vieja”.
