= Kuthenkully =

- village
- Location in Tamil Nadu, India Kuthenkully (India)
- Coordinates: 8°13′01″N 77°46′48″E
- Country: India
- State: Tamil Nadu
- District: Tirunelveli
- Demonym(s): Kuthenkulian, Kuthenkuzhian

Languages
  - Official: Tamil
- Time zone: UTC+5:30 (IST)
- Postal code: 627104
- Vehicle registration: TN-
- Nearest city: Tirunelveli; Nagercoil

Kuthenkuly (also called Kuthenkuzhi, Portuguese: Cutãoguli Patanão) is a village in Tamil Nadu, India. It is in the Radhapuram taluk of Tirunelveli district. The village got its name from the Tamil word for Nataraja, Kūttaṉ).

Even before the arrival of Francis Xavier in 1542, the inhabitants were Christians as they belong to the Paravar community of the Pearl Fishery Coast which embraced Catholicism as the result of their contact with the Portuguese. By the end of 1537, the entire community had declared itself to be Catholics. The village belongs to the Diocese of Tuticorin, whose patron saint is Francis Xavier. Kuthenkuly was known for the large number of teachers. The people are engaged in various occupations and living in different cities and countries and fishing is one of the major occupations.

Kuthenkully has a Catholic churches under the patronage of Saint Quiteria, one dedicated to the Epiphany, one to the Holy Cross and one to St Michael. People of the village celebrate Christmas, Epiphany, the feast of Saint Quiteria (Kitheri ammal) in May and also the Nativity of John the Baptist.

== Notable people ==
- Ignaci Siluvai, priest and educator

== Religion ==
The residents of this village belong to the Roman Catholic Church. Notable church buildings are:

- Holy Epiphany Church
- St. Quiteria Shrine Kuthenkuly
- Holy Cross Church
- St. Michael's Church

Kuthenkuly has numerous Kurusadis dedicated to various saints.

== See also ==
- Pastor Lenssen Polytechnic College
