= Higueruela =

Municipality of Spain

Coordinates: 38°58′N 1°27′W

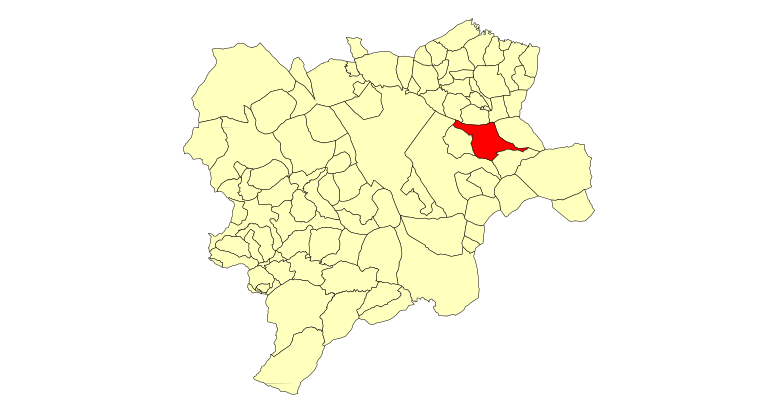
Higueruela in red

Higueruela (Spanish pronunciation: [i.ɣeˈɾwe.la]) is a municipality located at 43 km east of Albacete, Castile-La Mancha, Spain. It has a population of 1,350. The land surface is around 205.4 km² and its population density is calculated at 6.5/km².

The Higueruela Park features 244 wind turbines and it was the biggest wind farm in the world for some time. The Park was built in 1999, and it has an installed capacity of 161 MW.

Between May 21 and 24, the village celebrates Patron Saint Quiteria's day while Saint Barbara's day is celebrated every August. The main church is dedicated to Santa Quiteria, Higueruela.

== See also ==
- List of municipalities in Albacete
- Wind power in Spain
