= Auditus of Braga =

Portuguese bishop and saint

Saint Ovidius
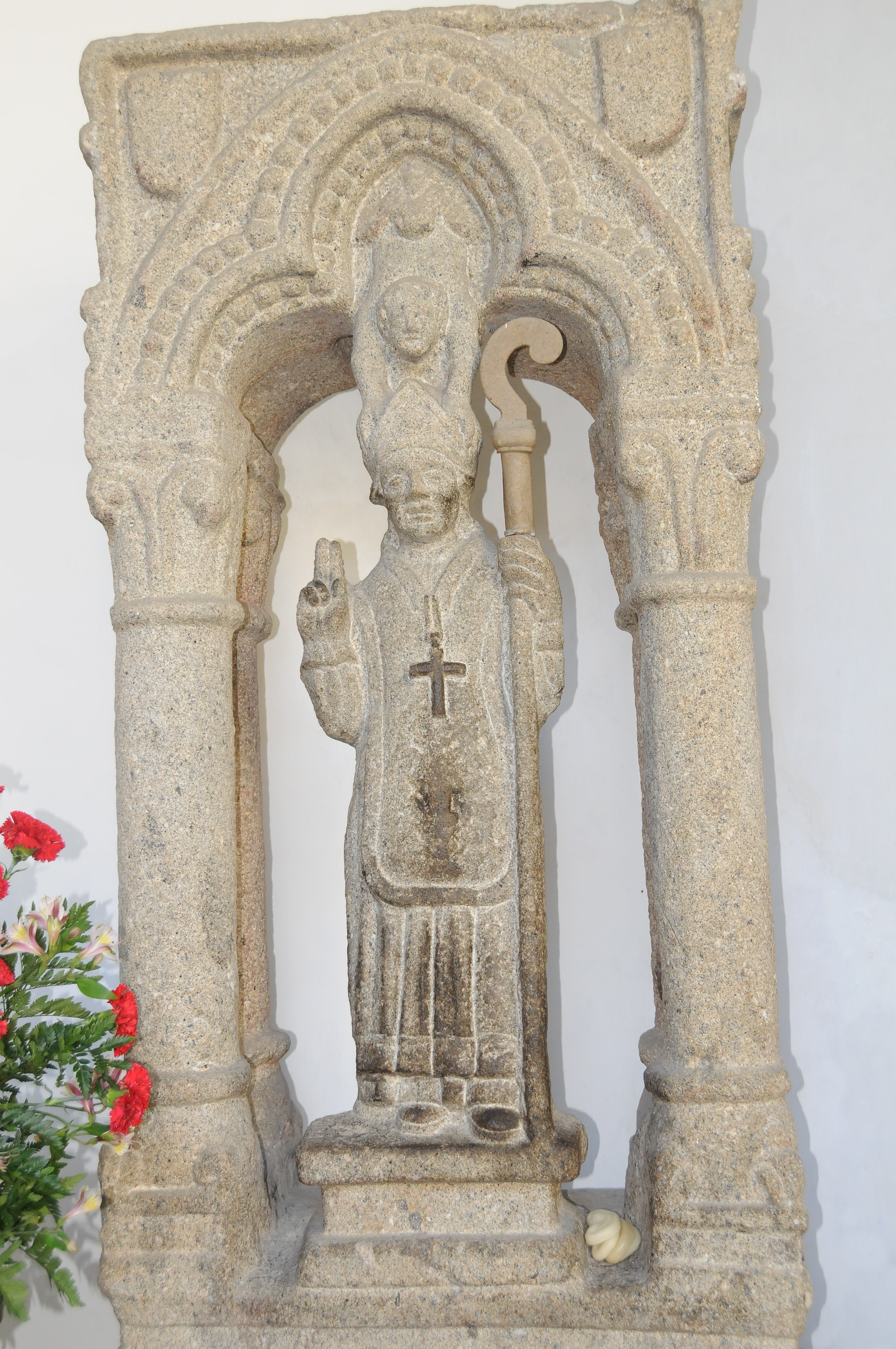
- Died: ~135
- Venerated in: Eastern Orthodox Church; Roman Catholic Church
- Canonized: Pre-congregation
- Major shrine: Braga
- Feast: June 3
- Attributes: episcopal vestments or depicted as a hermit
- Patronage: invoked against auditory diseases and conditions

Ovidius (Portuguese: Santo Ovídio), also Saint Auditus, was the third Bishop of Braga; he is a Portuguese saint.

== Hagiography ==
According to hagiographies of the 16th century, Ovidius was a Roman citizen of Sicilian origin. Tradition states that he was sent to Braga by Pope Clement I, where he served as the city's third bishop around 95.

He is said to have baptized Saint Quiteria and her sisters after they were abandoned by their mother. He was martyred for his Christian faith in 135.

== Veneration ==
The Portuguese call him Santo Ovídio, and sometimes, by the folkloric São Ouvido (literally "Saint that is heard" or "Saint Ear"), a folk-etymological translation of the Latin name Auditus.

His relics were elevated in 1527, thus giving official recognition to his cult. Accounts of the 17th century assert that in Lusitanian archaeological sites, Saint Ovidius was depicted in episcopal robes or in the garments of a hermit; these depictions testify to an ancient veneration. His sepulcher can be found in the cathedral of Braga.

Because of his name, Saint Auditus or Ovidius was traditionally invoked against auditory diseases. Under the base of his sepulcher in the cathedral, there were two holes into which the deaf would slip their fingers. They would then place their fingers into their ears and pray for a cure through the intercession of this saint.

His feast day is June 3.
