= Quiteria =

Gallo-Roman saint

Saint Quiteria
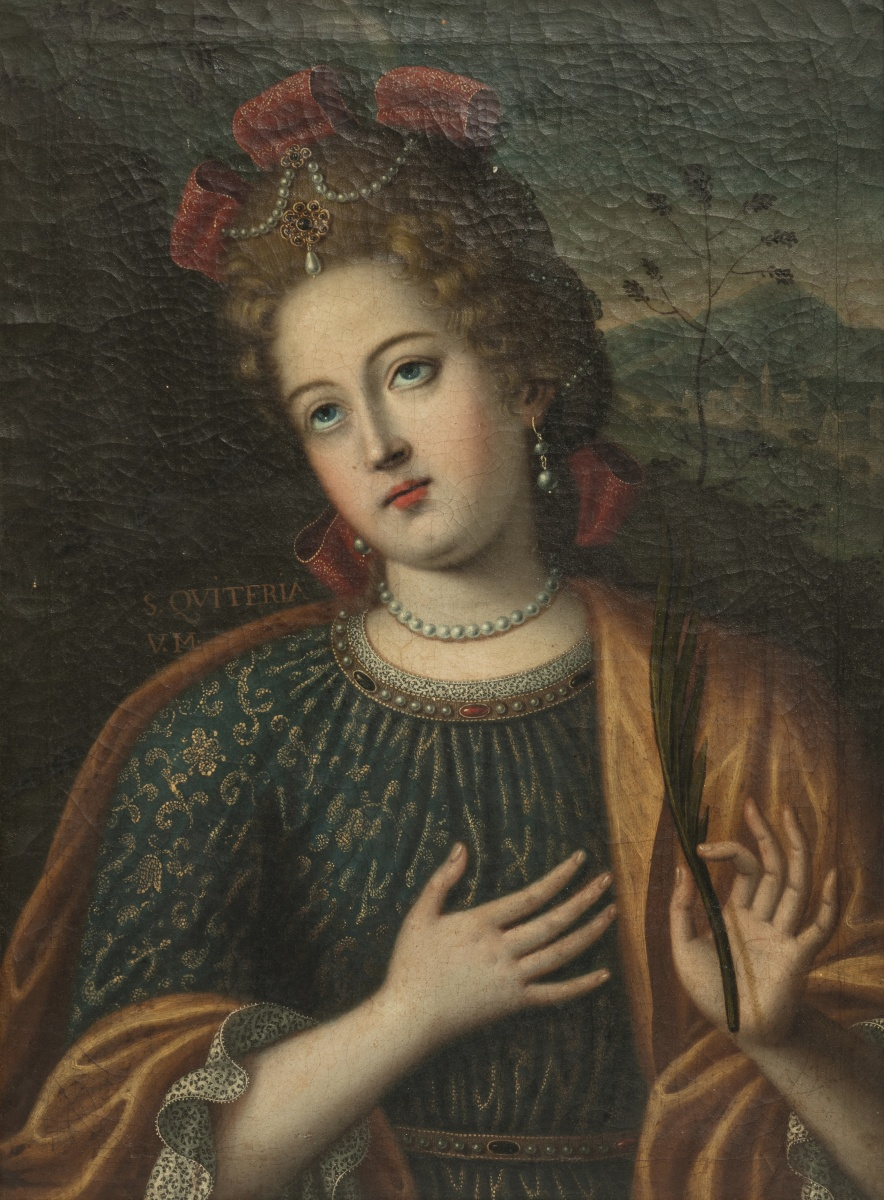
- 18th-century Portuguese painting of Quiteria

Virgin and martyr
- Born: 2nd Century; Braga, Lusitania (now Portugal)
- Died: 2nd century traditionally Aire-sur-l'Adour
- Venerated in: Catholic Church; Eastern Orthodox Church
- Canonized: 1716 by Pope Clement XI
- Major shrine: Aire-sur-l'Adour; Kuthenkuly
- Feast: 22 May
- Attributes: palm of martyrdom, dog on a lead, with her head in her hands, emerging from the sea
- Patronage: against rabies; Higueruela, Meca (Alenquer), Kuthenkuly

Quiteria was a 2nd century saint and virgin martyr about whom little is known. She is one of the patron saints of Toledo, Spain. Accounts of her life include refusal to marry, protection for the vulnerable, and waging a guerilla war against the Roman Empire.

== Name ==
Quiteria may be derived from Kythere (or Kyteria, Kuteria), a title applied to the Phoenician goddess Astarte which meant "the red one", or from (the possibly related name) Cytherea, an epithet of the Greek goddess Aphrodite because she was born on the island of Kythira.

== Legend ==
Quiteria is said to have been born in Bracara (now Braga, Portugal) to Lucius Catilius Serves, Roman governor of Gallaecia and Lusitania, and Calcia, his wife. Her father wanted her to marry and renounce Christianity. Quiteria fled and her father's men found her at Aire-sur-l'Adour, in Gascony. She was beheaded on the spot. Her sister, Liberata, also suffered the same fate in the forest of Montus and lies in a 14th-century sarcophagus in the fortified church of Saint Jean Baptiste in Mazéres 32 km from her sister Quiteria in Aire-sur-l'Adour.

== Quiteria and the Nonuplet sisters ==
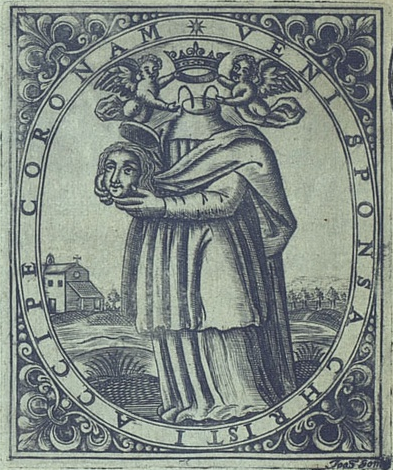
Allegory of the martyrdom of Saint Quiteria, in Vida e Martyrio da Gloriosa Santa Quiteria, 1651, by Pedro Henriques de Abreu

Portuguese religious traditions state that Quiteria was the leader of the "Nonuplet Sisters", who were named Eumelia (Euphemia), Liberata (Virgeforte), Gema (Marina of Aguas Santas, Margarida), Genebra, Germana, Basilissa, Marica; and Vitoria (Victoria). These were born in Bracara Augusta, currently Braga, in the region of Minho to an important Roman military official. Their mother, disgusted at the fact that she had given birth to nine daughters all at once as if she were a common peasant (or an animal), ordered a maid to take them to a river to drown them. (Alternately, Calcia, their mother, frightened that her husband would interpret these multiple births as a sign of infidelity, ordered her servant Sila to drown the girls in the Miñor River.)

Disobeying her mistress, however, the maid gave the girls over to some local women who brought them up as Christians. As adult women, they opposed the worship of Roman gods and were brought before their father, who recognized them as his daughters. Their father wanted them to marry Roman officers or other suitors. The nonuplets refused and were imprisoned in a tower. However, they escaped and liberated all of their other prisoners. They subsequently waged a guerrilla war in the mountains against the Roman Empire.

Quiteria was caught and beheaded. Her sister Eumelia, unable to escape from the soldiers who pursued her, threw herself from a cliff situated today in the Peneda-Gerês National Park (it is called today Penedo da Santa, Cliff of the Saint). A rock opened up and swallowed her and on the spot, there sprang up a hot spring.

Liberata (in Portuguese Livrada) is the patron saint of Sigüenza. The chapel dedicated to her in the transept of the city's cathedral, with a splendid reredos and the relics of the saint, was constructed at the expense of Bishop Fadrique de Portugal.

== Alternate legend ==
Other Portuguese traditions make her a native of Bracara (Braga, Portugal) who was decapitated and thrown into the sea. This legend states that she emerged from the water with her head in her hands, and is thus sometimes represented as such. However, she is not considered one of the Cephalophores because there is no written record to support this. Her patronage against rabies stems from the fact that her legend states that she held two rabid dogs at bay with the power of her saintly voice. A festival in her honour was first held at Tui, Galicia in 2018 after a proclamation was made by its bishop.

== In Kuthenkuly ==
Kuthenkuly, a coastal village in the Indian state of Tamil Nadu is the home to a shrine which is dedicated to Saint Quiteria. The shrine attracts thousands of pilgrims from different places. The shrine is known for its Thursday devotion. Quiteria is the patron saint of this village. The hagiography of Saint Quiteria, a Tamil language manuscript is preserved in this village.

=== Miracles ===
Saint Quiteria's statue was first brought to the village Kuthenkuly by Thommai Poobalarayar, a native of Kuthenkuly, who made an intention to her for an heir and also built a chapel. His wife gave birth to a boy child. Many miracles were reported at Kuthenkuly.

A few years later many people died of plague in the town, and all the villagers prayed to the saint and were saved from the plague. People converted the shrine of the saint into a big Church in 1914. In 2015, the centenary of the church was celebrated in a grand manner.

== Veneration ==
There is a church dedicated to Sainte-Quitterie in Aire-sur-l'Adour.
