= Saint Liberata (Pizzone) =

Saint Liberata is the patron saint of the city of Pizzone, Italy. She is declared a holy virgin and martyr by the Roman Catholic Church. Her father was Lucio Catelio Severo and mother was his wife Celsia. She had eight twin sisters (Geneva, Victoria, Eufemia, Germana, Marina, Marciana, Basilisa, and Quiteria), of which all of them, together with Liberata, were martyred, under the regime of Emperor Hadrian. Her remains are kept at the Cathedral of Sigüenza in Spain. Her feast day is celebrated in Pizzone on June 10, and in the United States (mainly around the Chicago area). Elsewhere her feast may be on January 16.

== Masses/Processions Held in Honor of Saint Liberata ==
Throughout the mid- and late-1900s, about 1,000 emigrants from Pizzone had migrated to the Chicago area. Now every June 8 at the Divine Savior Church in Norridge, Illinois, certain of those the emigrants attend a one-hour mass dedicated to the saint and also attend a thirty-minute religious procession around five blocks of the streets there, which also features a live trumpet/drum band, both first exiting and then entering the premise when finished. This is organized annually by the Saint Liberata Club of Chicago, founded 1944, also in honor of the saint. As for in Pizzone, on June 10, they also hold the same above-mentioned mass/procession also, though it is not known in what the manner they hold the activity.

== Inno a Santa Liberata V.M. ==
O liberata, i palpiti dei nostri cuori accogli, tu l'innocenza serbaci, e in noi sempre germogli ... germogli.

Tu di Pizzon le mura, proteggi o donna pura, tu di Pizzon le mura, proteggi o donna pura.

Te donna forte, i numi invano tentano di vincere, che del tuo sangue tingere, ti placque il suolo Ispano ... Ispano

Tu di Pizzon le mura ...

Hai vinto satana
Vincesti anche le divinitate
Quando sul legno intrepida
Chiuder volesti i lumi ... i lumi

Tu di Pizzon le mura
Proteggi o donna pura
Tu di Pizzon le mura
Proteggi o donna pura

Se ti transurano
Se all'odio ti fan segno con la croce
Salve! Che del Empireo
T'assunse Dio nel regno ... nel regno

Tu di Pizzon le mura
Proteggi o donna pura
Tu di Pizzon le mura
Proteggi o donna pura

Madre sorridici
Dal cielo Tu allieta i nostri cuori
Ed i profumi salgano
A te di questi fiori ... di fiori

Tu di Pizzon le mura
Proteggi o donna pura
Tu di Pizzon le mura
Proteggi o donna pura

== See also ==
- Wilgefortis

== Notes ==
This article was based in part on the article ‘Santa Liberata’ from the Italian Wikipedia.
