= Wind power in Spain =

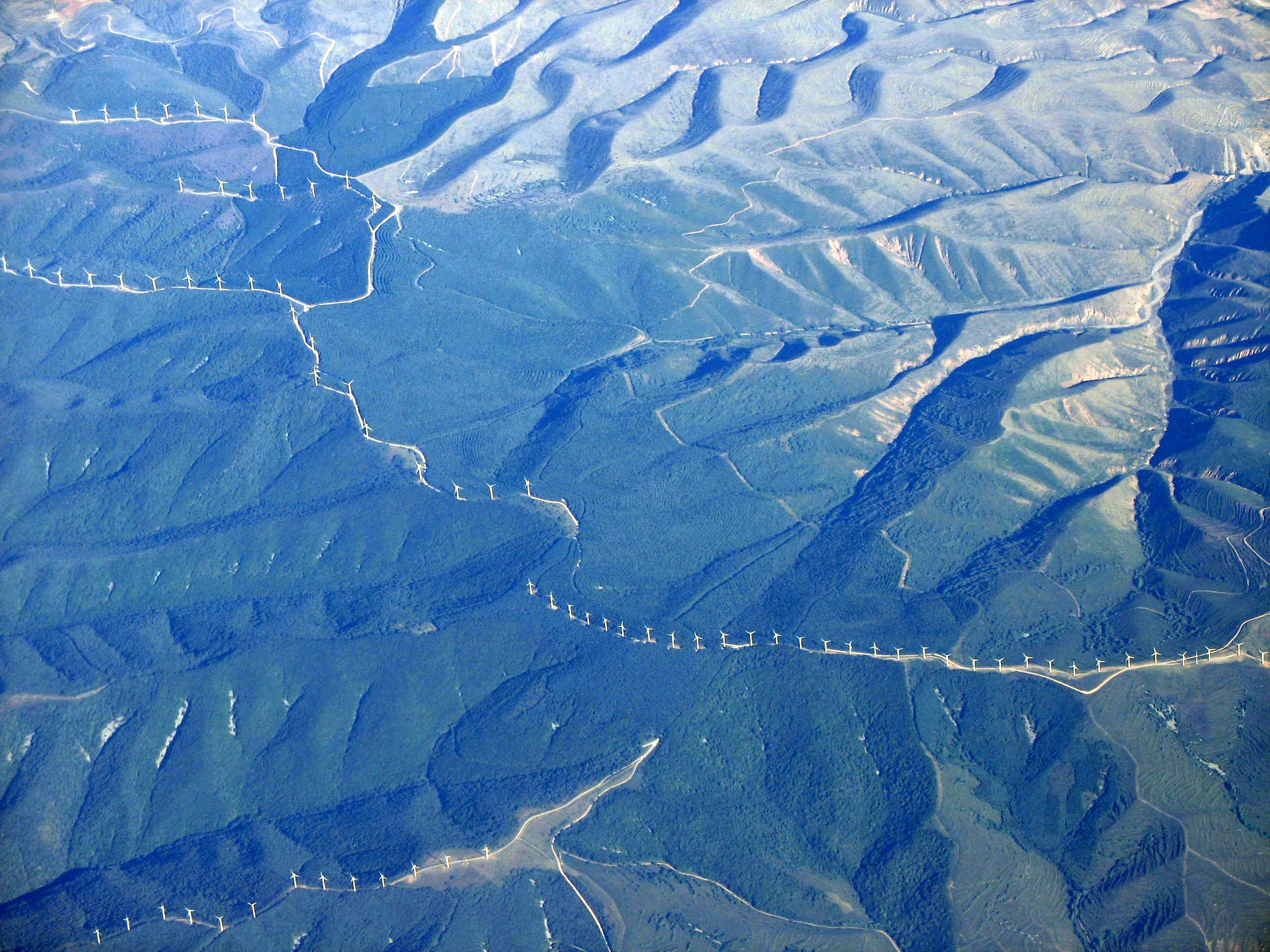
Aerial view of a wind farm in Spain

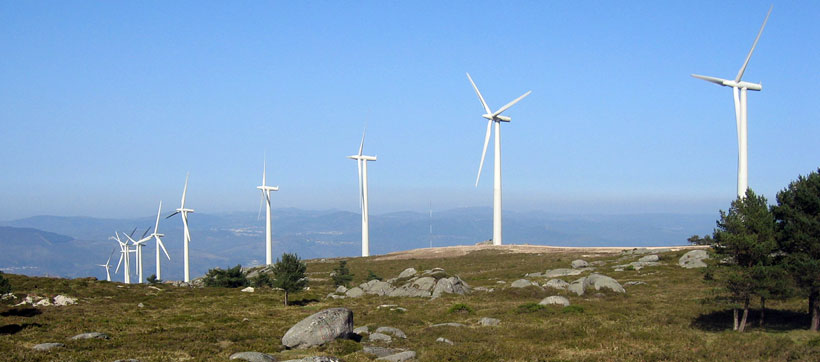
A wind farm in a mountainous area in Galicia, Spain

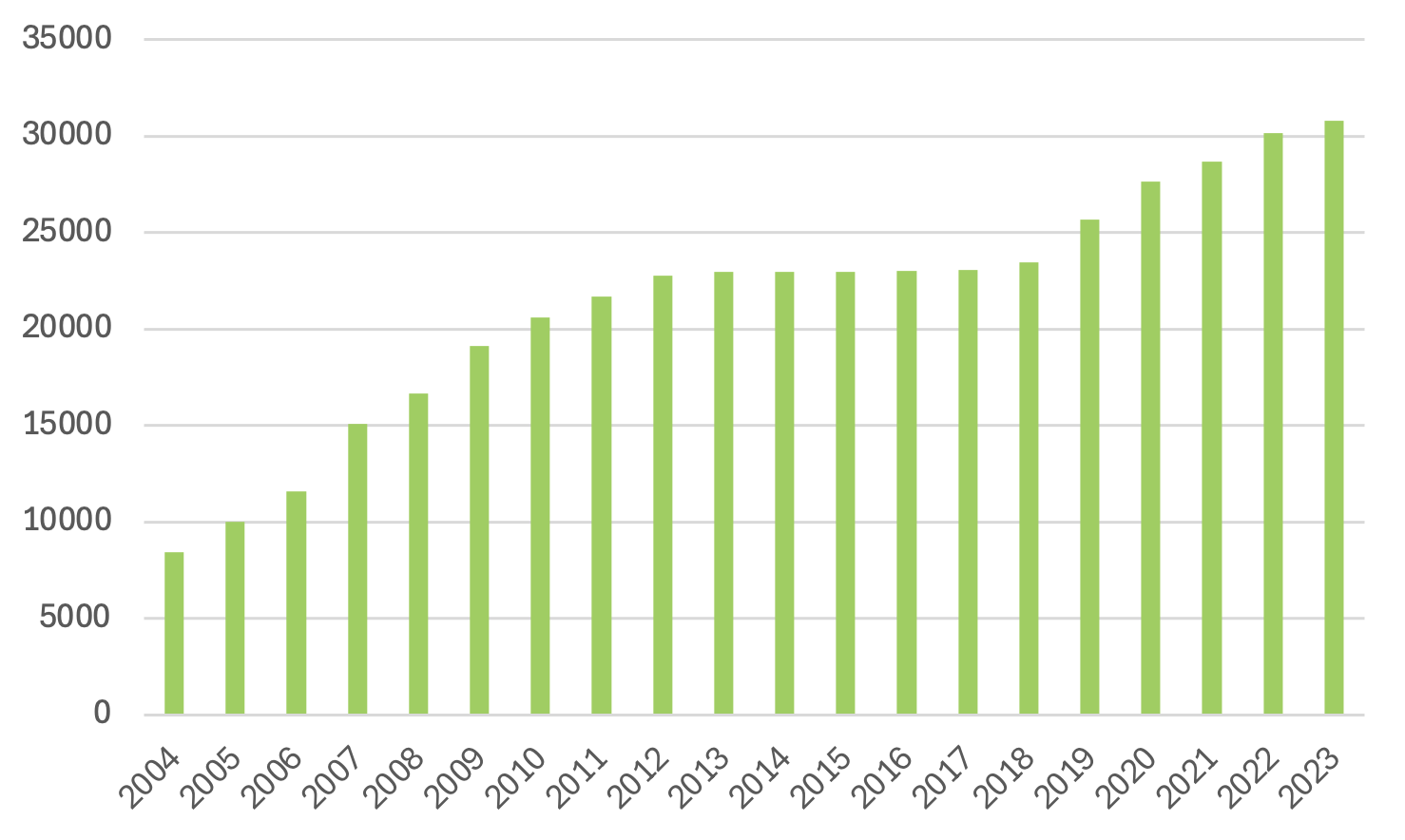
Installed wind power capacity in Spain (2004–2023)

Spain is one of the countries with the largest wind power capacity installed, with over 27 GW in 2020. In 2013, it had become the first country in the world to have wind power as its main source of energy.

== History ==
Spain was an early leader in development of wind power, ranking second after Germany by installed capacity until 2006, when it was surpassed by the United States.

In November 2009, a wind storm caused wind farms to produce a peak of 53% of total electricity demand (11.546 GW). This was surpassed in November 2011 with a capacity peak of 59% of power demand being generated by wind power.

In 2009, the largest producer of wind power in Spain was Iberdrola, with 25.5% of capacity, followed by Acciona with 20.9% and NEO Energia (EDP Renováveis) with 8.3%.

After the fallout from the financial crisis in 2008 and the dire straits of the Spanish economy in the subsequent period, installations of new wind turbines all but stagnated between 2012 and 2015, remaining at close to 23,000 MW installed capacity for the entire period. While Spain reduced wind turbine expansion, other countries continued to accelerate new wind turbine installations. By 2015, India had moved ahead of Spain in total installations.

On 6 February 2013, wind power achieved an earlier record in electricity production, reaching an instantaneous peak of 17,056 MW and an hourly production of 16,918 MWh.

In 2014, a record breaking year for renewable electricity production, wind power accounted for 20.2% of total electricity generation in Spain making it the second most important electricity source after nuclear power (22%) and ahead of coal power (16.5%). In earlier periods wind energy covered 16% of the demand in 2010, 13.8% in 2009 and 11.5% in 2008.

By year end 2015, Spain was the world's fifth largest producer of wind power with 23,031 MW installed capacity (including 11 MW of wind-hydro capacity), providing 48,118 GWh of power and 19% of the country's total electricity production in that year. On windy days, wind power generation has surpassed all other electricity sources in Spain; In November 2015, 70.4% of the electricity consumed in Peninsular Spain was covered with wind power energy.

In 2022, Spain's wind energy sector contributed significantly to the country's electricity supply, averaging 25% of total consumption. This figure stands in contrast to the European Union (EU) average, which is over 17%. On specific occasions, the contribution of wind power in Spain reached 50% of the total electricity demand, indicating the sector's capacity to meet a substantial portion of the country's energy needs.

By then end of 2025, Spain's wind energy sector has reached 33,274 MW of generation capacity and by this year's end having had generated 59.4 terawatt hours of electricity. Their infrastructure has also further diversified to more that 22,400 turbines across 1,450 wind farms. Recent goals include developing offshore wind farms, still being in its infancy and with a minimal commercial cap targeting 1-3 GW by 2030.

Spain has also taken an interest in pioneering a new generation of wind energy tech by using a bladeless tyrbine that generates electricity via vibrations instead of spinning blades. Calling this technology Vortex Bladeless generating electricity through oscillations of its tall and slender carbon fibre and fibreglass cylinder.

== Onshore capacity and generation ==
Wind power national installed capacity (MW) and generation 2006–2025
	2006	2007	2008	2009	2010	2011	2012	2013	2014*	2015*	2016	2017	2018	2019	2020	2021
Installed capacity (MW)	11,416	13,664	16,133	18,860	19,706	21,166	22,757	23,003	23,031	23,031	23,066	23,092	23,484	25,704	27,759	28,139
Total generation (GWh)		27,612	32,160	38,253	43,545	42,465	48,508	54,713	51,032	48,118	47,697	47,907	49,581	54,245	54,879	60,485
_{*Includes 11 MW of Wind-Hydro hybrid system and associated generation of 1 GWh in 2014, 9 GWh in 2015.}

== Offshore ==
As of 2023 Spain has no commercial offshore wind turbines in operation. There is a plan to have 3GW of offshore power installed by 2030. The lack of a suitable offshore shelf means floating turbines will probably be needed to achieve this and likely locations are being identified.

In September 2022, the Spanish Ministry for Ecological Transition and the Demographic Challenge published a strategic roadmap for the development of offshore wind and marine energy. This roadmap aligns with the "EU Strategy on Offshore Renewable Energy" and has resulted from a collaborative effort involving various stakeholders, including economic entities, governmental administrations, and the public. Within this roadmap, Spain aims to deploy between 1 and 3 GW of offshore wind power by 2030, in alignment with global and European objectives. Notably, the International Energy Agency (IEA) anticipates offshore wind contributing to half of Europe's wind power generation by 2040, while the European Commission's "Strategy on Offshore Renewable Energy" aims for at least 60 GW of offshore wind by 2030.

== Regional trends ==
Installed windpower capacity (MW)
Rank	Autonomous Region	2008	2009	2010	2015	2022
1	Castile and León	3,334.04	3,882.72	4,803.82	5,560.01	6,507.2
2	Aragon	1,749.31	1,753.81	1,764.01	1,893.31	4,922.5
3	Castile-La Mancha	3,415.61	3,669.61	3,709.19	3,806.54	4,786.2
4	Galicia	3,145.24	3,231.81	3,289.33	3,314.12	3,863.1
5	Andalusia	1,794.99	2,840.07	2,979.33	3,337.73	3,543.8
6	Navarre	958.77	961.77	968.37	1,003.92	1,351.9
7	Catalonia	420.44	524.54	851.41	1,267.05	1,341.8
8	Valencian Community	710.34	986.99	986.99	1,118.59	1,238.8
9	Asturias	304.30	355.95	355.95	518.45	695.5
10	Canary Islands	134.09	138.34	138.92	165.11	620.1
11	La Rioja	446.62	446.62	446.62	446.62	446.6
12	Murcia	152.31	152.31	189.91	261.96	262.0
13	Basque Country	152.77	152.77	153.25	153.25	153.3
14	Extremadura	0	0	0	0	39.4
15	Cantabria	17.85	17.85	35.30	35.30	35.3
16	Balearic Islands	3.65	3.65	3.65	3.68	3.7
	Spain total (MW)	16 740.32	19 148.80	20 676.05	22,988.00	29,813.00

A 2006 article stated that the intended wind energy capacity to be installed in the autonomous regions by 2010–2011 at 20,000 MW.

=== Navarra ===
The US rating agency Standard & Poors, in a 2006 investigation of standard of living in Europe, ranked Navarre, whose primary source of renewable energy was wind power, uppermost among the 17 autonomous regions of Spain. At that time Navarre sustained approximately 70 percent of its electricity needs from renewable energy sources, wind farms being used most extensively, and had a 900-megawatt capacity of installed wind power.

Navarre lacks thermal, nuclear, coal, oil, gas fields, or hefty hydro-electric power stations, but does possess considerable wind renewable resources, which the Government of Navarre pursued to drop its external energy dependence. Navarre was entirely reliant on imported energy until wind-power development and utilization began progress in 1996.

=== Galicia ===
In 2007 Galicia led Spain in wind power development amongst the autonomous regions for the third consecutive year with an increase in wind power of 264 MW, succeeding Castilla La Mancha (which exceeded its development goal of 1,000MW), Castile and León, Aragon and Navarre, and the remaining autonomous regions.

== Industry ==
A 2005 report showed the Spanish wind energy sector hosting the involvement of over 500 companies, with approximately 150 wind turbine production plants and their machinery across the Spanish regions. The assets of the Spanish industry were noticed and acted upon by financial analysts, as United States Ernst and Young in 2005 ranked the wind market in Spain among the uppermost in its index of "long-term country attractiveness". Including those indirectly employed in supplying components and services, the total number of jobs supported by Spain's wind industry had reached more than 30 000, and was estimated to double to 60 000 by 2010" (2005).

=== Companies ===
==== Gamesa Eólica ====
Gamesa, based in the Basque Country is a large global wind turbine manufacturer with 13% share by installed power in 2005. The company values the distinctive geographical setting of Spain as a benefit to Spanish companies competing in the global arena. Gamesa Eólica currently operates plants in Spain, The US and China. It has projects in many other parts of the world including Egypt, Germany, Ireland, Italy, Japan, Korea, and Portugal. Gamesa opened a manufacturing plant for wind turbine generator blades in Philadelphia, Pennsylvania in 2005, creating 500 part-time building and operations jobs and 236 permanent manufacturing jobs; the building, operation, and upkeep of Gamesa's wind farms, in conjunction with its two Philadelphia offices and production plant, formed about 1,000 jobs in the state over a five-year period. The company seeks expansion into Greece, Taiwan, and the United Kingdom. Gamesa merged with Siemens in 2017.

==== Ecotècnia / Alstom Wind ====
Ecotècnia, established 1981, and by 2005 had 2.1% world market share by installed capacity, with wind turbines in production of up to 1.6MW. In 2009 the company was acquired by Alstom for €350million. The company continued to develop wind turbines; a 3MW machine was installed in a commercial windfarm in 2009. In 2010 the company was renamed Alstom Wind. In 2011/2 the company developed a prototype 6MW permanent magnet gearless generator for offshore applications, in association with LM Wind Power and Converteam.

==== Acciona Energy ====
Acciona Energy (Acciona Energía), the biggest global wind-park developer at the time, operated in Australia, Canada, France, Germany, Morocco, Spain, and the United States. The company credited its success to its initial stages in Navarre during 1994. Its line of work involved wind-farm operation, turbine manufacture, and the development of wind-power plants, and the company intended to expand into China, Ireland, and the United Kingdom.

==== Iberdrola ====
Iberdrola held functioning facilities in Brazil, France, Greece, Italy, Mexico, Portugal, Spain, the United States and the United Kingdom, and continued to develop wind farms in Europe and Latin America.

As of 2008, Iberdrola plans to develop six offshore wind farm projects with a combined generation capacity of 3000 MW at locations off the coasts of the Spanish Atlantic provinces of Cadiz, Huelva and the Mediterranean province of Castellon.

==== MTorres ====
MTorres initiated their activities in the Wing Energy field in 1998, with the launch of their newly developed Wind Turbine TWT-1.5/70, a 1500 KW variable-speed direct-drive multipole Wind Turbine with a full-power converter and a 70 meters rotor diameter.

=== Exports ===
The national Spanish wind energy industry began exporting its wind generators by forming contracts for the erection of wind farms in China, India, and Mexico, as well as Cuba, where work began in 1998 (2007). They also had contracts at a highly developed stage with Portugal, Turkey, Tunisia, Egypt, Brazil, and Argentina.

The wind energy capacity for major companies in Spain was the following as of 2007: Gamesa Eólica, 3281 MW; Made, 803 MW; Neg Micon, 715 MW; Ecotècnia, 446 MW; G. Electric, 343 MW; Izar-Bonus, 317 MW; Desa & AWP, 121 MW; Enercon, 58 MW; Lagerwey, 38 MW; and Others, 113 MW (2007).

=== Research ===
Largely concerned with advancing energy efficiency use in Spain, the Institute for Energy Saving and Diversification (IDAE) also seeks to expand renewable energy sources and energies.

Research concerning the production of hydrogen from electrolysis of water by a wind farm began in 2004 at a newly installed laboratory in the Universidad Pública de Navarra under an agreement between Energía Hidroeléctrica de Navarra, Stuart Energy Systems of Canada, and Statkraft of Norway. The lab replicated the power generation environment of a wind farm and examined the effects of an electrolyzer.

Concentrated research is occurring concerning wind measurement in the Albacete region at Higueruela.

== Future development ==
Three factors may influence the further progress of wind power development in Spain: the capability of the wind farms network to hold all the electricity harnessed by wind power, predominantly in off-peak times, the cost of energy, and the environmental effect that the abundance of wind farm development in Spain could turn out. The Spanish wind power industry is confronted with the following issues:

- formulating its development to be congruent with required supply agreements by the national electricity supply operator
- guaranteeing that the installation of wind farms occurs with recognition of the environment
- synchronizing wind power development of the 17 autonomous regions
- trimming down the investment costs to acquire sufficient returns with declining energy prices in the upcoming years.

It is also noteworthy that the supportive Spanish policies for wind power development have resulted in severe competition for construction sites among major companies. Political leaders in the autonomous communities have been frazzled by the numerous applications for wind farm construction. Local possession of wind power is not present in Spain, but does not appear to take away from further development of wind power in Spain since a much smaller and weaker quantity of local anti-wind farm grid population inhabits the country.

A further obstacle concerning wind power development needs to be tackled before Spain can achieve these ambitious objectives: construction of a central control center for all the Spanish wind farms, analogous to the control center used for traditional power plants.

Some wind farms co-locate with solar farms and batteries, achieving higher utilization of a shared grid connection.

== Opposition ==
With some exceptions, there has been little opposition to the installation of inland wind parks in Spain. The projects to build such facilities offshore have been more controversial.

In 2003, there came a proposal to build the largest offshore wind farm in the world on the site of the 1805 Battle of Trafalgar, off the southwest coast of Spain. This has been met with strong opposition from the towns on the coast around Cádiz, who fear for their tourism and fisheries industries. There have also been complaints by the British, who claim that the area is a war grave and that any development of the area could destroy archaeological evidence of the historic battle.

Opposition to wind power in Spain has emerged in rural communities, particularly in regions like Aragón, as the nation rapidly expands its renewable energy projects. According to a report published in 2022 by Euronews, concerns have been raised about the environmental and visual impacts of large-scale wind farms and solar installations, leading to conflicts with local residents. Groups like "Energy and Territory Alliance" (ALIENTE) have voiced their opposition, advocating for smaller, community-focused renewable projects over industrial-scale developments.

== See also ==
- Renewable energy in Spain
- Electricity sector in Spain
- Renewable energy by country
- Wind power in the European Union
- Renewable energy commercialization
