= Shyamal Bose (bishop) =

Indian Roman Catholic bishop

Most Reverend Shyamal Bose
- Bishop of Baruipur
- Archdiocese: Calcutta
- Diocese: Baruipur
- Appointed: 4 May 2020
- Predecessor: Salvadore Lobo
- Successor: TBD
- Previous post: Coadjutor bishop of Baruipur

Orders
- Ordination: 5 May 1991 by Linus Nirmal Gomes
- Consecration: 24 June 2019 by Thomas D'Souza

Personal details
- Born: 24 March 1961 (age 65) Gosaba West Bengal India
- Denomination: Roman Catholic
- Residence: Roman catholic Diocese of Baruipur
- Parents: Late.Martin Bose
- Education: St. Peter's Pontifical Seminary
- Motto: "Trust in his strength"

Styles of Shyamal Bose
- Reference style: The Most Reverend
- Spoken style: The Most Reverend
- Religious style: Bishop

Bishop Shyamal Bose is the current serving bishop of the Roman Catholic Diocese of Baruipur, India.

== Early life and education ==
Bose was born on 24 March 1961 in Gosaba, West Bengal, India. He studied at St. Xavier's F P School, in Basantithe and Gosaba for his primary and secondary school education. For minor seminary he joined St. John Mary Vianney Minor Seminary in Barasat, and the Morning Star Regional Major Seminary in Barrackpore, Kolkata. He attended St. Albert's College, Ranchi, Jharkhand for his theological studies.

He acquired a Licentiate in Biblical Theology from St. Peter's Pontifical Institute, Bengaluru.

== Priesthood ==
Bose was ordained a priest for the Diocese of Baruipur on 5 May 1991.

== Episcopate ==
On 17 May 2019, Bose was appointed the Coadjutor Bishop of the Roman Catholic Diocese of Baruipur by Pope Francis, and consecrated by Archbishop Thomas D’Souza on 24 June 2019. He is also serving as a Financial Administrator and Chancellor of the Diocese of Baruipur since 2016. He succeeded as bishop of the Roman Catholic diocese of Baruipur on 4 May 2020.
