= Lepcha (surname) =

Lepcha (Lepcha: लेप्चा) is a surname of Northern Indian origin, referring to the Lepcha people. Notable individuals with the surname include:

- Athup Lepcha, Indian politician
- Dorjee Tshering Lepcha, Indian politician
- Erung Tenzing Lepcha, Indian politician
- Hildamit Lepcha (born 1956), Indian folk musician
- Jerman Lepcha (1910–1992)
- Karma Sonam Lepcha, Indian politician
- Keepu Tsering Lepcha (born 1942), Indian social worker and activist
- Kunga Nima Lepcha, Indian politician
- Lee Yong Lepcha (born 1991), Indian cricketer
- O. T. Lepcha Indian politician
- Ong Lepcha (born 1988), Indian footballer
- Pamin Lepcha, Indian politician
- Pintso Namgyal Lepcha, Indian politician
- Ruben Lepcha (born 1988), Indian cricketer
- Ruden Sada Lepcha, Indian politician
- S. P. Lepcha (1927–2018), Indian Marxist politician
- Samdup Lepcha, Indian politician
- Sangay Lepcha, Indian politician
- Som Lepcha (born 1977), Indian cricketer
- Sonam Gyatso Lepcha, Indian politician
- Sonam Tshering Lepcha (1928–2020), Indian folk musician
- Stephen Lepcha, Indian Catholic Bishop of the Diocese of Darjeeling
- Sushmita Lepcha (born 1996), Indian footballer
- Tiyasha Lepcha (born 1999), Indian actress
- Tshering Wangdi Lepcha, Indian politician
- Yong Tshering Lepcha, Indian politician
