= Lepcha =

Lepcha may refer to:

- Lepcha people, of eastern Nepal, Sikkim and Darjeeling district
- Lepcha language, of the Lepcha people
- Lepcha script
- Lepcha (Unicode block)
- Lepcha (beetle), a genus of beetles in the family Carabidae
- Lepcha (surname)
