= Collège Matteo Ricci =

School in Brussels, Belgium

Metteo Ricci College
- Collège Matteo Ricci (French)

Location
- Boulevard Poincaré / Poincarélaan 67; 1070 Anderlecht, Brussels-Capital Region; Belgium
- Coordinates: 50°50′30″N 4°20′22″E

Information
- Type: General secondary
- Religious affiliation: Jesuit (Catholic)
- Established: 2019; 7 years ago
- Director: Fabian Van Troyen
- Gender: Mixed
- Campus size: 5 buildings
- Website: collegematteoricci.be

Matteo Ricci College (French: Collège Matteo Ricci) is a mixed French-language Catholic secondary school in the municipality of Anderlecht in Brussels, Belgium. It was established in September 2019 by the Society of Jesus, the first Jesuit school to be opened in Belgium in the 21st century, and is named after Matteo Ricci. It is located at 67, boulevard Poincaré/Poincarélaan, 400 m (1,300 ft) north-east of Brussels-South railway station.

== History ==
In Brussels, the French-speaking Jesuits were already present at St Michael's College and St Jean Berchmans Church. In 2015, the Jesuits decided to build a new school in the Anderlecht municipality and started the plans for its construction. There was a need for extra schools in the area, with many nearby schools being over-registered.

Construction of the school was supported by "those involved in the Brussels community life, by former students of the Jesuits and by the Society of Jesus, in dialogue with the Archdiocese of Mechelen–Brussels." In November 2017, it was reported that the Maimonides Jewish Athenaeum in Anderlecht would close because of a lack of students. With the site of former athenaeum vacant, it was decided to open the new school there.

In January 2019, it was reported by La Libre and RTBF that a new Jesuit college offering general secondary education was being built, affiliated to the General Secretariat of Catholic Education (French: Secrétariat général de l'enseignement catholique) in French-speaking Belgium, and that it would open in September 2019.

The school's first director is Anne L'Olivier, who was previously director at Notre-Dame de la Sagesse school.

== Facilities ==
The school opened with a capacity of 820 students. It has five buildings, including a sports hall and a performance hall. As part of teacher training and introduction classes for new students, new teachers give supervised remedial classes to new students three weeks before the start of the academic year.

== See also ==
- List of Jesuit sites in Belgium
