= Clement Tirkey =

21st-century Indian Catholic bishop

Most Reverend Clement Tirkey
- Bishop of Jalpaiguri
- Archdiocese: Calcutta
- Diocese: Jalpaiguri
- Appointed: 3 December 2014
- Predecessor: James Anthony Toppo
- Successor: Incumbent

Orders
- Ordination: 21 March 1978
- Consecration: 23 April 2006 by Telesphore Toppo

Personal details
- Born: 12 September 1947 (age 78) Chhattisgarh India
- Denomination: Roman Catholic
- Motto: Collaborator of God with joy

Clement Tirkey is the current serving bishop of the Roman Catholic Diocese of Jalpaiguri, India.

== Early life ==
Tirkey was born in Chhattisgarh, India on 12 September 1947.

== Priesthood ==
Tirkey was ordained a priest on 21 March 1978 for the Darjeeling diocese but was incardinated in Bagdogra diocese on 14 June 1997.

== Episcopate ==
Tirkey was appointed bishop of Jalpaiguri on 31 January 2006 and consecrated on 23 April 2006 by Cardinal Telesphore Toppo.
