= Paul Goethals =

Belgian Jesuit priest and missionary

The Most Reverend Paul Monsignor Goethals SJ
- Archbishop of Calcutta
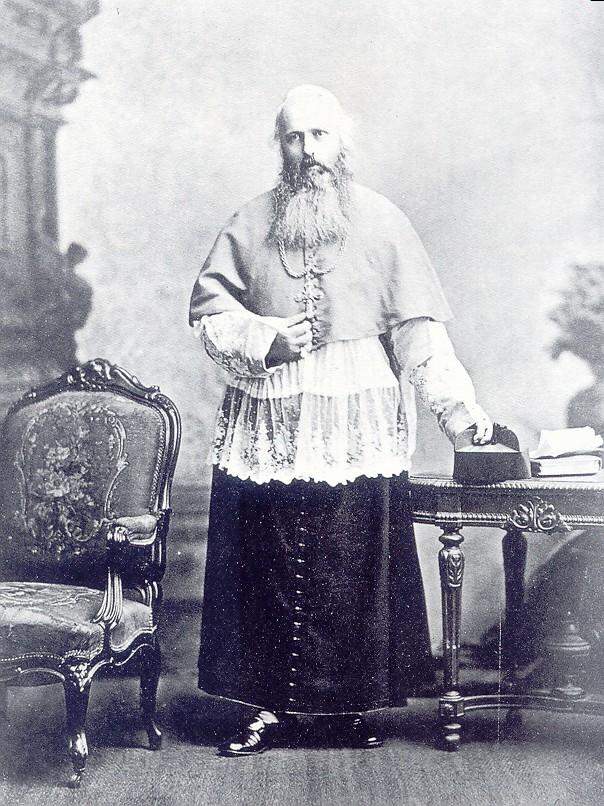
- Mgr Paul Goethals, first Archbishop of Calcutta
- Church: Roman Catholic Church
- Archdiocese: Archdiocese of Calcutta
- Installed: 25 November 1886
- Term ended: 4 July 1901
- Successor: Brice Meuleman
- Other posts: Vicar Apostolic of Western Bengal, India (1877–1878), Titular Archbishop of Hierapolis in Phrygia (1878–1886)

Orders
- Ordination: 11 September 1862 by Luigi Oreglia di Santo Stefano
- Consecration: 24 February 1878 by Johan Joseph Faict
- Rank: Archbishop

Personal details
- Born: Paul François Marie Goethals; 11 November 1832 Kortrijk, Belgium
- Died: 4 July 1901 (aged 68) Calcutta, India
- Denomination: Roman Catholic
- Residence: Calcutta, India
- Parents: Ferdinand Goethals^{(Father)}
- Education: Catholic University of Leuven^{(1863–1867)}

Styles of Paul Goethals
- Reference style: The Most Reverend
- Spoken style: Monsignor

Ordination history of Paul Goethals
History
Priestly ordination
- Ordained by: Archbishop Luigi Oreglia di Santo Stefano
Episcopal consecration
- Principal consecrator: Bishop Jean Joseph Faict.
- Co-consecrators: Bishop Théodore-Joseph Gravez, Bishop Edmond Hyacinthe Theodore Joseph Dumont
Episcopal succession
Bishops consecrated by Paul Goethals as principal consecrator
- Theodore Dalhoff: 31 January 1892
- Ladislaus Michael Zaleski: 15 May 1892

Paul-François-Marie Goethals, S.J. (11 November 1832, Kortrijk, Belgium – 4 July 1901, Calcutta, India), was a Belgian Jesuit priest, missionary in British India and the first Archbishop of Calcutta.

== Early years and Formation ==
Paul-François-Marie Goethals was born in Kortrijk, Belgium, into an influential and politically active family. His father, Ferdinand Goethals (1786–1860), was member of the founding National Congress of Belgium of 1831. Paul did his secondary studies at Collège Saint-Servais, a Jesuit high school in Liège, Belgium. After joining the Society of Jesus he did his philosophical studies in Namur (1856–1857) and theology at the Catholic University of Leuven (1863–1867), both in Belgium.

== Rector and Provincial ==
Goethals was the Rector of the second Collège Saint-Michel, a Jesuit high School in Brussels (1868–1869) and soon afterwards the Provincial Superior of the Belgian Jesuits (1870–1876). Then he was the Rector of another Jesuit high school, this time in Namur at Collège Notre-Dame de la Paix, where the University of Namur now stands. Everything seemed to have him destined for a successful administration career in Jesuit educational institutions. However, his destiny was changed when, because of his combination of leadership qualities and good knowledge of English, he was chosen as Apostolic Vicar of Calcutta. The Bengal mission was at that time entrusted to the Belgian Jesuits.

== Archbishop of Calcutta ==
Goethals arrived in Calcutta, as the Vicar Apostolic, on 4 November 1878. When the Catholic hierarchy was established in India (1 September 1886), he became the first Archbishop of Calcutta. The 23 years with Archbishop Goethals at the helm were years of development and consolidation of the Catholic Church in East India, with the establishment of the Jesuit Theologate (now the Vidyajyoti College of Theology) in Kurseong, near Darjeeling (1889), the arrival of numerous religious congregations who opened missions, schools and dispensaries. He is also the founder of the first indigenous religious congregation of women, the Daughters of St Anne, in 1899.

Goethals actively encouraged evangelization and education in the Chota Nagpur Plateau of Central India and was an effective help to Constant Lievens's work among the Mundas, Oraons and Kharias in the future state of Jharkhand. In and around Darjeeling, in the foothills of the Himalayas, he also opened new missionary centres and backed the Jesuits' foundation of the St Joseph High School in Darjeeling. A boarding school in Kurseong keeps his memory alive with the name of Goethals Memorial School.

In Calcutta, Archbishop Goethals started a Catholic printing press, establishes several new parishes and gathered a collection of more than 6000 books on India (religions, geography, travels, culture and languages) that became the nucleus of the present Goethals Indian Library and Research Centre (attached to St. Xavier's College, Calcutta). The Archbishop was always intellectually open and quite active in the cultural and social life of the city. At one time, he was the president of the Asiatic Society of Bengal, an association of scholars (founded by William Jones) devoted to promoting a better knowledge and appreciation of Indian languages and civilisations.

He died in Calcutta on 4 June 1901. A solemn service was held on July 11, and the Bishop of Dhaka, Peter Joseph Hurth, one of his close friends, delivered the eulogy.

== Legacy ==
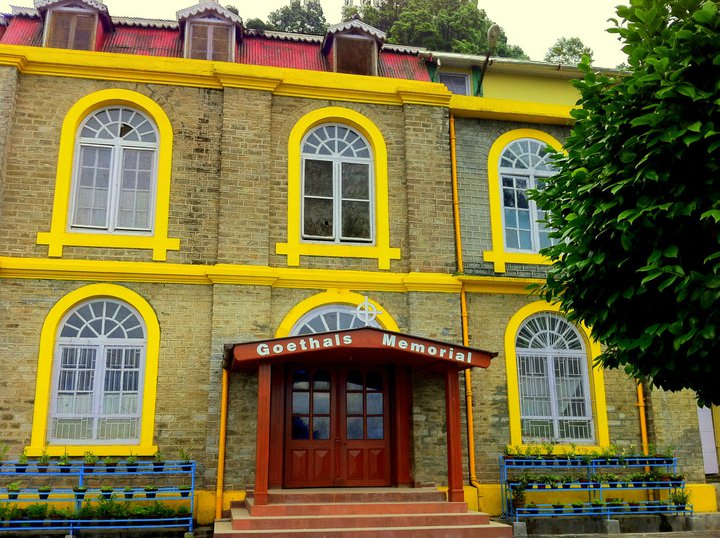
Entrance of Goethals Memorial School, Kurseong

=== Goethals Memorial School ===
Goethals Memorial School is a boarding school in Kurseong. It was founded in 1907 and was named after Paul Goethals.

=== Goethals Library ===
Goethals library is located above the chapel of St. Xavier's College, Kolkata. In 1908 the college received a large collection of rare books, periodical and journals from Archbishop of Calcutta Paul Goethals. These well preserved collections are made into a library and named after Paul Goethals.

== Bibliography ==
- (in English) Paul Goethals: A Catalogue of books on India, and Indian subjects (Calcutta: Publisher unknown, 1894)
- (in French) Anonymous, Missions belges de la Compagnie de Jésus [Belgian Missions of the Society of Jesus] (Brussels: C. Bulens, 1904)
- (in English) Fidelis de Sa, Crisis in Chota Nagpur: with special reference to the judicial conflict between Jesuit missionaries and British government officials, November 1889-March 1890 (Bangalore: Redemptorist Publications, 1975)
- (in French) Henri Josson, La Mission du Bengale occidental ou Archidiocèse de Calcutta. Province belge de la Compagnie de Jésus [The Mission of the West Bengal and the Archdiocese of Calcutta: Belgian Province of the Society of Jesus], Volume II (Bruges: Imprimerie Sainte-Catherine, 1921)

Catholic Church titles
Preceded by Walter Steins	5th Vicar Apostolic of Western Bengal; 1877–1886	Succeeded by none
Preceded by none	1st Archbishop of Calcutta; 1886–1901	Succeeded by Brice Meuleman
