= Brice Meuleman =

Jesuit priest and missionary in British India

The Most Reverend Brice Meuleman D.D., SJ
- Archbishop Emeritus of Calcutta
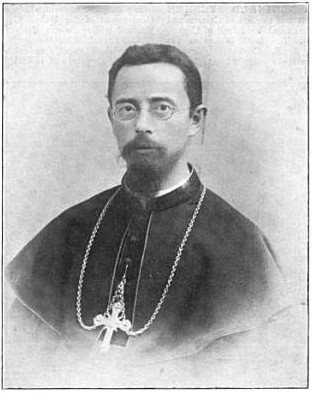
- Brice Meuleman, second Archbishop of Calcutta (now Kolkata)
- Church: Roman Catholic Church
- Archdiocese: Archdiocese of Calcutta
- Province: Calcutta
- Metropolis: Calcutta
- See: Calcutta (emeritus)
- Installed: 23 June 1924
- Term ended: 15 July 1924
- Successor: Ferdinand Perier
- Previous post: Archbishop of Calcutta^{(1902–1924)}

Orders
- Ordination: 20 January 1895
- Consecration: 25 May 1902 by Bishop Godefroid Pelckmans, O.F.M. Cap.
- Rank: Archbishop

Personal details
- Born: Brice Meuleman; 1 March 1862 Gand, Belgium.
- Died: 15 July 1924 (aged 62) Marseille, France
- Denomination: Roman Catholic

Styles of Brice Meuleman
- Reference style: The Most Reverend
- Spoken style: Your Grace

Ordination history of Brice Meuleman
History
Episcopal consecration
- Principal consecrator: Bishop Godefroid Pelckmans, O.F.M. Cap.
- Co-consecrators: Bishop Teotónio Emanuel Ribeiro Vieira de Castro, Bishop Francesco Pozzi, P.I.M.E.
Episcopal succession
Bishops consecrated by Brice Meuleman as principal consecrator
- Bishop Santino Taveggia, P.I.M.E.: November 04, 1906
- Archbishop Hermann Jürgens (Juergens), S.J.: July 14, 1907
- Bishop Louis Van Hoeck, S.J.: March 06, 1921

Brice Meuleman, S.J., D.D. (1 March 1862, Ghent, Belgium – 15 July 1924, Marsailles, France), was a Jesuit priest, a missionary in British India, and the second Archbishop of Calcutta (now Kolkata).

== Early years ==
Brixius Meuleman was born on 1 March 1862 in Ghent, one of the six sons of Desiderius (also Desiré) Meuleman (1821–1898), a soapmaker (zeepzieder), and his wife, Maria Coleta De Smet (b. 1826). But his parents actually came from Sint-Lievens-Houtem, a Dutch speaking village 10 miles (17.5 km) southeast of Ghent in East Flanders, where their families had already been living for several generations. Brixius was named in honor of St. Brixius, the 4th Bishop of Tours, whose feast day was actually on 13 November. But, like the saint’s name, his name was spelled, in his years as the Archbishop, by the reports, newspapers and magazines as Brice in English and French, Brixius in Dutch and Latin, Brizio in Italian and Brictius in German, the dominant languages of the Archdiocese of Calcutta.

Meuleman joined the Society of Jesus on 23 September 1879 with a novitiate (the "First Probation" of the Jesuit formation) in Arlon, Belgium. He proceeded with his Juniorate (the "Second Probation") in Tronchiennes (1881-1883) and his studies of philosophy at the University of Louvain (1883–1886). Having finished his studies, he left Europe at the end of 1886 to join the Mission of the West Bengal in India.

In Calcutta, at the College of St. Francis Xavier, Meuleman was the Lecturer of Philosophy and History from 1888 to 1889 and then upheld the Magisterium as a professor and an inspector from 1889 to 1892. In 1892, he moved to Kurseong for the first time to continue his studies of theology. Kurseong was where he was ordained as a priest in 1895. He spent his Third Year (the "Third Probation") in Ranchi. In 1897 he returned to the College of St. Francis Xavier as the Professor of Logic, Philosophy and Political Economy. On 15 August 1895, in Calcutta, he took his Profession of the Fourth Vow, finally becoming a full-fledged member of the Society of Jesus.

In 1898, Meuleman returned to Kurseong to be the Minister of Theology and Professor of Holy Scripture at the Seminary of the Society of Jesus (now the Vidyajyoti College of Theology). A year later, he was promoted to the office of the Rector there but he continued to teach classes on the Holy Scripture and work as the Prefect of Studies. In November 1900 he was appointed as the Superior Regular of the West Bengal Mission. It was the last stop of his journey to Calcutta.

=== Archbishop of Calcutta ===
Two years later, on 21 March 1902, Meuleman was nominated to succeed the late Paul Goethals as the Archbishop of Calcutta. Two months later, on Trinity Sunday, 25 May 1902, he was consecrated and enthroned at the Cathedral of Our Blessed Lady of the Rosary in Calcutta by Dr. Godefroid Pelckmans, O.F.M. Cap., the bishop of Lahore, with assistance from Bishop Francesco Pozzi, P.I.M.E., of Krishnagar and Bishop Teotonio Emanuele Ribeiro Vieira de Castro of Mylapore.

As the Archbishop, Meuleman was particularly active in establishing missions in the 24 Parganas District and the Chota Nagpur Division (now the state of Jharkhand). During the 1910s, he opened several schools, including St. Albert’s Seminary in Bankuli (now in the Khunti district) in 1914, in the Ranchi district to educate and prepare the tribal Indians for the religious life as priests and monks. According to legend, these schools were his response to the declaration of the Apostolic Delegate to British India that the Catholic Church in the West Bengal would need a hundred years to have its own native priests. So Archbishop Meuleman formed the plan to “start a Primary School in every village, an Upper Primary School in every parish, a Middle School in every station and a High School in Ranchi” and to make the education of girls as important as the education of boys. Archbishop Meuleman had the reputation of being kind, intelligent and mild-mannered, always concerned with the souls and welfare of the Indians.

On 21 December 1921, Meuleman promoted a Jesuit from Antwerp, Ferdinand Perier, the former Superior Regular of the West Bengal Mission, who had been in India since 1906, to the rank of Coadjutor Bishop.

== Last years ==
Eventually, the Archbishop’s health began to fail. In June 1924 he moved to France in the hopes of recovering his health but his hopes were not realized. So, on 23 June 1924, he resigned from his offices. As the Coadjutor Bishop, Monsignor Périer automatically succeeded him as the third Archbishop of Calcutta. Three weeks later, on 15 July 1924, Meuleman died in Marseilles.

== Legacy ==
A street in St.-Lievens-Houtem, Belgium, bears the name of Monseigneur Meulemanstraat (Dutch, "Monsignor Meuleman Street") in honor of the Archbishop.

== Bibliography ==
- (in English) "The Most Reverend Dr. Brice Meuleman, Roman Catholic Archbishop of Calcutta", The Cyclopedia of India: Biographical — Historical — Administrative — Commercial, Volume 1, Illustrated (Calcutta: The Cyclopedia Publishing Co., 1907), page 140
- (in Spanish) Angel Santos Hernández, S.J., "2.4. Brice Meuleman, Arzobispo de Calcutta", Jesuitas y obispados: Los Jesuitas Obispos Misioneros y los Obispos Jesuitas de la extinción, Tomo II (Madrid: Universidad Pontificia Comillas de Madrid, 2000), pages 184-185
- (in French) Henri Josson, S.J., La Mission du Bengale occidental ou Archidiocèse de Calcutta. Province belge de la Compagnie de Jésus [The Mission of the West Bengal and the Archdiocese of Calcutta: Belgian Province of the Society of Jesus], Volume II (Bruges: Imprimerie Sainte-Catherine, 1921), pages 254-261
- (in English) J. Meunier, S.J., Funeral oration preached at the funeral service for His Grace Dr. B. Meuleman S.J. Archbishop of Calcutta on July 21st 1924 at the Metropolitan Church, Calcutta, 1924
- Memorabilia of the Society of Jesus, Volume II, pages 173 & 220
- (in French) Les Missions Belges de la Compagnie de Jésus [The Belgian Missions of the Society of Jesus], 1924, pages 293-297, 327-332
- (in Dutch) G[eraard]. Turkenburg, S.J., Aartsbisscop en missionaris [Archbishop and Missionary] (Louvain: Xaveriana, 1925)

Catholic Church titles
Preceded by Paul Goethals	2nd Archbishop of Calcutta; 1902–1924	Succeeded by Ferdinand Perier
