= Diocese of Jalpaiguri =

Roman Catholic diocese in West Bengal, India

Coordinates: 26.5358°N 88.6872°E

Diocese of Jalpaiguri Dioecesis Ialpaiguriensis जलपाईगुड़ी के सूबा

Location
- Country: India
- Ecclesiastical province: Calcutta
- Metropolitan: Calcutta

Statistics
- Area: 9,614 km^{2} (3,712 sq mi)
- Population: Total; Catholics: (as of 2022); 6,773,993; 141,758 (2.1%)
- Parishes: 30

Information
- Rite: Latin Rite
- Established: 17 January 1952; 73 years ago
- Cathedral: Christ Redeemer Cathedral Jalpaiguri

Current leadership
- Pope: Leo XIV
- Bishop: Fabian Toppo
- Metropolitan Archbishop: Thomas D'Souza
- Bishops emeritus: Clement Tirkey

The Roman Catholic Diocese of Jalpaiguri (Latin: Ialpaigurien(sis)) is a diocese located in the city of Jalpaiguri in the ecclesiastical province of Calcutta in India.

== History ==
- 17 January 1952: Established as the Diocese of Jalpaiguri from the Diocese of Dinajpur

== Leadership ==
- Bishops of Jalpaiguri (Latin Rite)
  - Bishop Fabian Toppo (8 February 2025 – present
  - Bishop Clement Tirkey (31 January 2006 – 8 February 2025)
  - Bishop James Anthony Toppo (24 April 1971 – 4 May 2004)
  - Bishop Francis Ekka (29 November 1967 – 24 April 1971)
  - Bishop Ambrose Galbiati, P.I.M.E. (20 March 1952 – 22 March 1967)
