= Stephen Lepcha =

Most Reverend Stephen Lepcha
- Bishop of Darjeeling
- Archdiocese: Calcutta
- Diocese: Darjeeling
- Appointed: 14 June 1997
- Installed: 8 December 1997
- Predecessor: Eric Benjamin
- Successor: Incumbent

Orders
- Ordination: 15 December 1982
- Consecration: 8 December 1997 by Henry Sebastian D'Souza

Personal details
- Born: Stephen Lepcha; 22 December 1952; 73 years ago Darjeeling
- Denomination: Roman Catholic
- Residence: Bishop's House, Darjeeling, West Bengal, 734101, India
- Motto: FIAT IN FIDE

Bishop Stephen Lepcha is the serving Bishop of the Roman Catholic Diocese of Darjeeling.

== Early life ==
He was born in Suruk, Darjeeling, West Bengal, India on 22 December 1952.

== Priesthood ==
He was ordained a Catholic priest on 15 December 1982.

== Episcopate ==
He was appointed Bishop of Darjeeling on 14 June 1997 and Ordained on 8 December 1997.

== See also ==
- List of Catholic bishops of India
