= Diocese of Jamshedpur =

Roman Catholic diocese in Jharkhand & West Bengal, India

Coordinates: 22.7918°N 86.2253°E

Diocese of Jamshedpur Dioecesis Iamshedpurensis
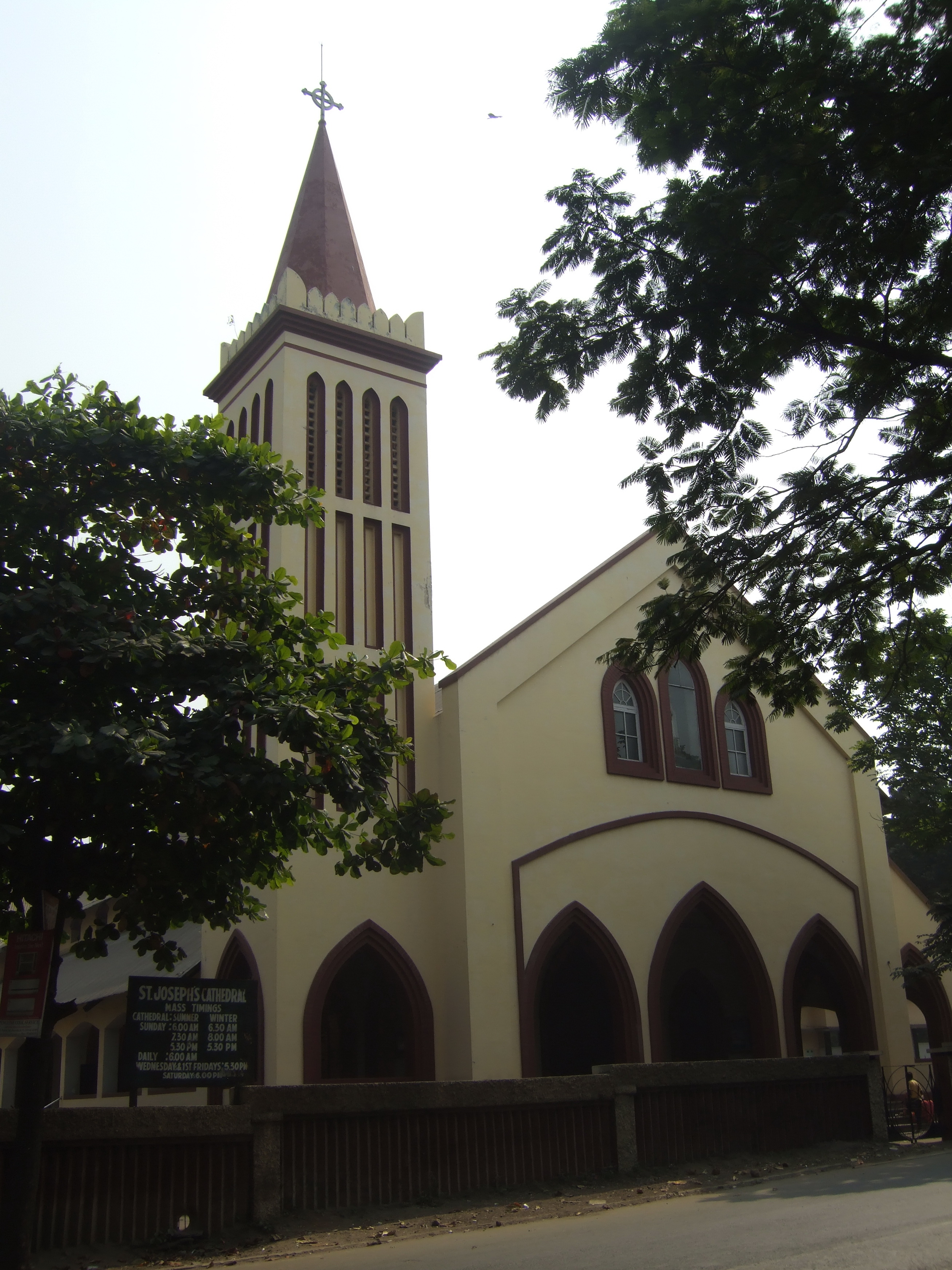
- Cathedral of St Joseph-the-Worker

Location
- Country: India
- Ecclesiastical province: Ranchi
- Metropolitan: Ranchi

Statistics
- Area: 21,003 km^{2} (8,109 sq mi)
- Population: Total; Catholics: (as of 2022); 11,830,000; 73,000 (0.6%)
- Parishes: 38

Information
- Rite: Latin Rite
- Established: 2 July 1962
- Cathedral: Cathedral of St Joseph-the-Worker, in Jamshedpur

Current leadership
- Pope: Leo XIV
- Bishop: Telesphore Bilung, S.V.D.

Website
- jamshedpurdiocese.org

The Roman Catholic Diocese of Jamshedpur (Latin: Iamshedpuren(sis)) is a diocese located in the city of Jamshedpur in the ecclesiastical province of Ranchi in India.

== History ==
- 2 July 1962: Established as Diocese of Jamshedpur from the Archdiocese of Calcutta

== Leadership ==
- Bishops of Jamshedpur (Latin Rite)
  - Bishop Telesphore Bilung, S.V.D. (1 November 2021 – present)
  - Bishop Felix Toppo, S.J. (14 June 1997 – 24 June 2018)
  - Bishop Joseph Robert Rodericks, S.J. (25 June 1970 – 9 January 1996)
  - Archbishop Lawrence Trevor Picachy, S.J. (later Cardinal) (Apostolic Administrator 29 May 1969 – 25 June 1970)
  - Bishop Lawrence Trevor Picachy, S.J. (later Cardinal) (12 July 1962 – 29 May 1969)
