= Linus Nirmal Gomes =

Indian Roman Catholic bishop (1921–2021)

The Right Reverend Linus Nirmal Gomes SJ
- Bishop Emeritus of Baruipur
- Church: Roman Catholic Church
- Diocese: Roman Catholic Diocese of Baruipur
- See: Baruipur (emeritus)
- Installed: 31 October 1995
- Other post: Bishop of Baruipur.^{(1977-1995)}

Orders
- Ordination: 21 November 1954
- Consecration: 19 November 1977 by Lawrence Trevor Picachy
- Rank: Bishop

Personal details
- Born: Linus Nirmal Gomes; 7 September 1921 Boro Gola
- Died: 27 February 2021 (aged 99) St.Xaviers College, kolkata
- Buried: Roman catholic diocese of Baruipur
- Denomination: Roman Catholic
- Residence: Baruipur, West Bengal, India
- Motto: Do Whatever He Tells You

Styles of Linus Nirmal Gomes
- Reference style: The Right Reverend
- Spoken style: The Right Reverend
- Religious style: Bishop

Ordination history of Linus Nirmal Gomes
History
Episcopal consecration
- Principal consecrator: Lawrence Trevor Picachy
- Co-consecrators: Henry Sebastian D'Souza, Michael Atul D'Rozario
Episcopal succession
Bishops consecrated by Linus Nirmal Gomes as principal consecrator
- Alphonsus F. D'Souza: 17 May 1987

Linus Nirmal Gomes, S.J. (7 September 1921 – 27 February 2021) was an Indian Roman Catholic prelate, who served as the first bishop of the newly established diocese of Baruipur since 1977. He retired in 1995.

Gomes was born in the village of Boro Golla, Dhaka, East Bengal. He joined the Society of Jesus on 26 June 1942, and was ordained a priest on 21 November 1954. Gomes was appointed bishop to the Diocese of Baruipur on 30 May 1977 and ordained bishop on 19 November 1977. Gomes retired on 31 October 1995 as bishop of the Baruipur Diocese. He died in February 2021 at the age of 99.
