= Walter Steins Bisschop =

Roman Catholic Bishop of Auckland New Zealand

Walter Steins Bisschop SJ
- (Arch)Bishop of Auckland
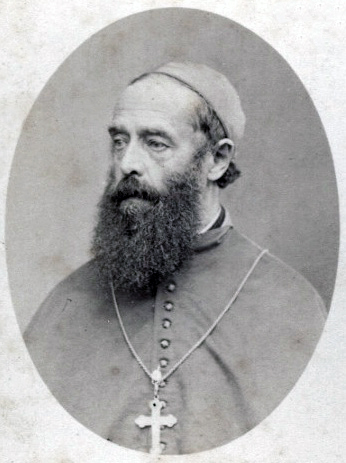
- Church: Catholic Church
- Diocese: Diocese of Auckland
- In office: 23 April 1879 – 7 September 1881
- Predecessor: Thomas Croke
- Successor: John Luck
- Previous posts: Titular Archbishop of Bostra (1867-1879); Vicar Apostolic of Western Bengal (1867-1877); Titular Bishop of Nilopolis (1860-1867); Vicar Apostolic of Bombay (1860-1867); Apostolic Administrator of Poona (1860-1867)

Orders
- Ordination: 8 September 1842
- Consecration: 29 June 1861 by Matteo Eustachio Gonella

Personal details
- Born: Walterus Hermanus Jacobus Steins Bisschop; 1 July 1810 Amsterdam, Amstelland Department, Kingdom of Holland, French Empire
- Died: 7 September 1881 (aged 71) Sydney, Colony of New South Wales, British Empire

Walter Hermanus Jacobus Steins SJ (1 July 1810 – 7 September 1881) was a Dutch Jesuit and Catholic prelate, who became Vicar Apostolic of Bombay (1860–1867) and West Bengal (1867–1877) in India, archbishop ad personam, and third Bishop of Auckland (1879–1881).

== Early life ==
Walter Steins was born in 1810 in Amsterdam, Netherlands. He was educated there, at St Acheul, Amiens and at Fribourg, Switzerland. In 1832 he entered the Belgian province of the Society of Jesus, was ordained a priest on 8 September 1842 (in Louvain), and made his final profession as a Jesuit in 1849.

== Vicar Apostolic in India ==
Steins obtained permission from his superiors to proceed to Borneo (at that time part of a Dutch colony) but went instead to Bombay where he exercised his priestly ministry until 29 June 1861 when he was consecrated a Bishop and assumed the office of Vicar Apostolic. He founded the college of St Francis-Xavier In 1867 he was translated to become Vicar Apostolic of West Bengal, based in Calcutta. He brought to Bengal the French religious order of the Daughters of the Cross, founded the St Vincent's home refuge and many schools and orphanages. He began also the Bengali mission and missions to the Santals and other eastern tribes. Because of ill-health caused by a fall he was advised to return to Europe and he spent time recuperating at Conflans-sur-Seine, the novitiate of the Sisters of the Sacred Heart in Paris.

== Bishop of Auckland ==
Steins recovered sufficiently to request a further appointment and on 16 May 1879 he was appointed as Bishop of Auckland. He arrived on 3 December 1879 and was 15 months in the country. He died on 7 September 1881 in Sydney, as he was, once again, returning to Europe. Archbishop Steins " ... was a distinguished theologian and linguist; broadminded and tolerant". He attended the First Vatican Council in 1870.

== Honorific eponyms ==
Steins Avenue in Hillsborough, Auckland was named after Bisschop in the early 1980s.

== References/Sources ==
- E.R. Simmons, A Brief History of the Catholic Church in New Zealand, Catholic Publication Centre, Auckland, 1978.
- E.R. Simmons, In Cruce Salus, A History of the Diocese of Auckland 1848 – 1980, Catholic Publication Centre, Auckland 1982.

Catholic Church titles
Preceded by Anastaisas Hartmann OFM Cap	15th Vicar Apostolic of Bombay; 1860–1867	Succeeded by Johann Gabriel Léon Louis Meurin SJ
Preceded by Patrick Joseph Carew	4th Vicar Apostolic of Western Bengal; 1867–1877	Succeeded by Paul Goethals SJ
Preceded by Thomas Croke	3rd Bishop of Auckland; 1879–1881	Succeeded by John Luck OSB
