= Diocese of Baruipur =

Roman Catholic diocese in West Bengal, India

Coordinates: 22.3749°N 88.4243°E

Diocese of Baruipur Dioecesis Baruipurensis বারুইপুর के सूबा
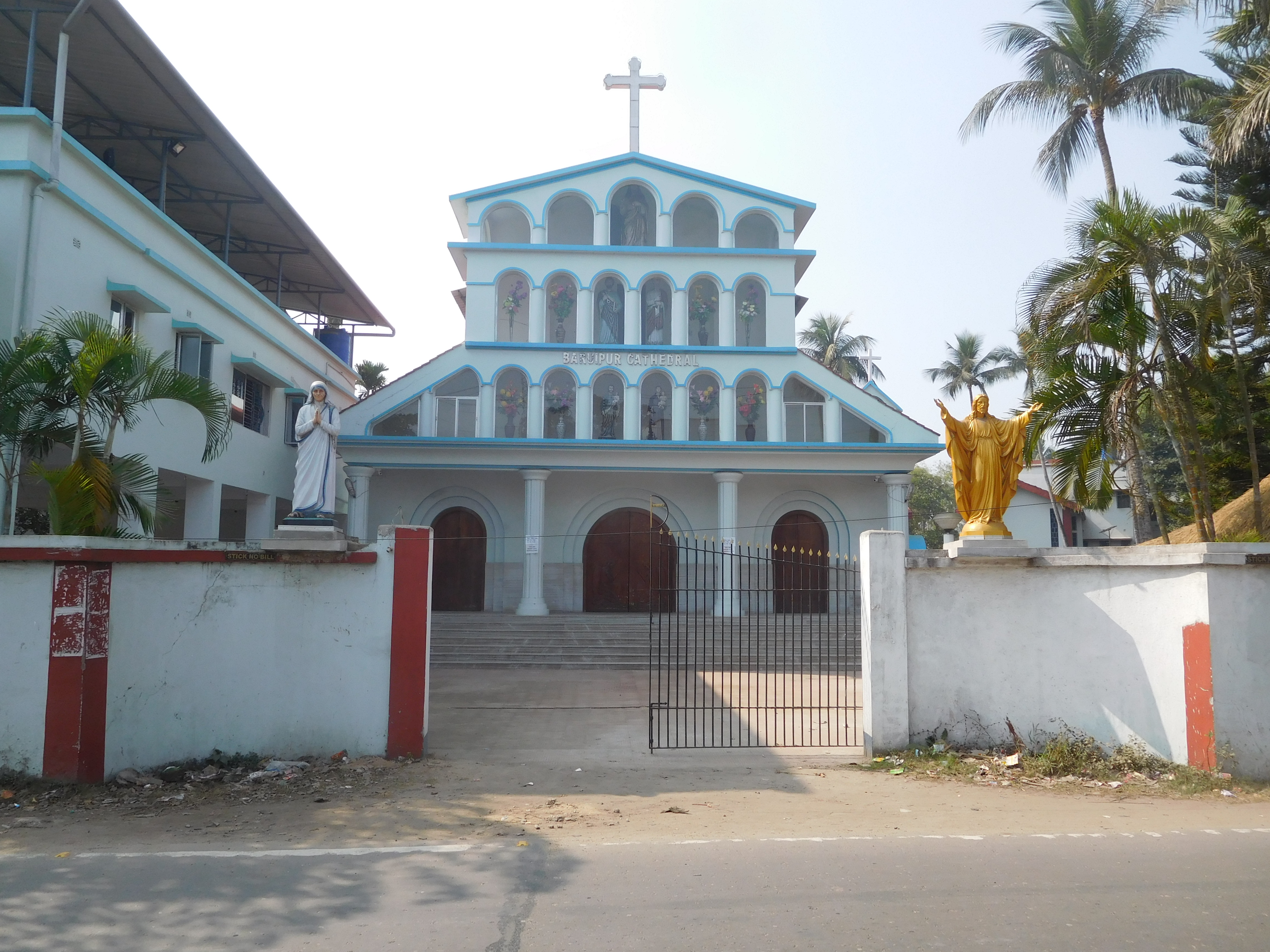

Location
- Country: India
- Ecclesiastical province: Calcutta
- Metropolitan: Calcutta

Statistics
- Area: 10,880 km^{2} (4,200 sq mi)
- Population: Total; Catholics: (as of 2012); 9,834,000; 60,465 (0.6%)
- Parishes: 22

Information
- Rite: Latin Rite
- Cathedral: Cathedral of the Immaculate Heart of Mary in Baruipur
- Patron saint: Immaculate Conception

Current leadership
- Pope: Leo XIV
- Bishop: Shyamal Bose
- Metropolitan Archbishop: Elias Frank

Website
- Website of the Diocese

The Roman Catholic Diocese of Baruipur (Latin: Baruipuren(sis)) is a diocese located in the city of Baruipur in the ecclesiastical province of Calcutta in India.

== History ==
- May 30, 1977: Established as Diocese of Baruipur from the Metropolitan Archdiocese of Calcutta
- May 17, 2019: Father Shyamal Bose, the treasurer and chancellor of the diocese, was appointed Coadjutor Bishop to assist Bishop Salvadore Lobo in the pastoral and administrative of the diocese.

== Saints and causes for canonisation ==
- Ante Gabric

== Leadership ==
- Bishops of Baruipur (Latin Rite)
  - Bishop Shyamal Bose (May 4, 2020 - current)
  - Bishop Salvadore Lobo (October 16, 1997 – May 2020)
  - Bishop Linus Nirmal Gomes, S.J. (May 30, 1977 – October 31, 1995)
