= Lucas Sirkar =

Indian Roman Catholic archbishop (1936–2021)

Lucas Sirkar SDB
- Archbishop of Calcutta
- Church: Catholic Church
- Archdiocese: Archdiocese of Calcutta
- In office: 2 April 2002 – 23 February 2012
- Predecessor: Henry Sebastian D'Souza
- Successor: Thomas D'Souza
- Previous posts: Coadjutor Archbishop of Calcutta (2000-2002); Bishop of Krishnagar (1984-2000)

Orders
- Ordination: 20 April 1968
- Consecration: 22 September 1984 by Hubert D’Rosario

Personal details
- Born: 24 September 1936 Presidency of Fort William in Bengal, British Raj, British Empire
- Died: 18 April 2021 (aged 84) Krishnanagar, West Bengal, India

Lucas Sirkar, SDB (24 September 1936 – 18 April 2021) was an Indian Roman Catholic archbishop. He served as the archbishop of the Roman Catholic Archdiocese of Calcutta. He was succeeded by Thomas D'Souza, the current serving Archbishop of Calcutta.

He was ordained as a priest on 20 April 1968 and was a member of the religious institute, the Salesians of Don Bosco.

On 22 June 1984 he was appointed and on 22 September 1984 was consecrated as a Diocesan Bishop of Krishnagar. On 14 April 2000, he was appointed Coadjutor Archbishop of Calcutta. After the retirement of Henry Sebastian D'Souza, he succeeded him on 2 April 2002 as Archbishop of Calcutta. On 23 February 2012, Pope Benedict XVI accepted the resignation request made by Lucas Sirkar citing advanced age.

Sirkar died on 18 April 2021.
