= Paul Grosjean =

Paul Grosjean FBA SJ
- Church: Catholic Church

Orders
- Ordination: 1932

Personal details
- Born: 26 May 1900
- Died: 13 June 1964 (aged 64)
- Occupation: Scholar
- Education: St Michael College, Brussels University of Oxford

Paul Grosjean, FBA SJ (26 May 1900 – 13 June 1964) was a Belgian Jesuit priest, Bollandist, and Celtic scholar.

Born in Uccle, Grosjean studied at St Michael College, Brussels before becoming a Jesuit novice in 1917. He was selected by Hippolyte Delehaye to become a Bollandist, studied at the University of Oxford, returned to Belgium for his military service, then studied in Dublin. Ordained a priest in 1932, he returned to St Michael College, where he spent the remainder of his career, preparing a number of biographies of Celtic saints. He mastered Celtic and Latin, in addition to several modern languages.

He was elected a Corresponding Fellow of the British Academy in 1950.
