= Ferdinand Perier =

Belgian Jesuit priest and missionary

The Most Reverend Ferdinand Perier SJ
- Archbishop Emeritus of Calcutta
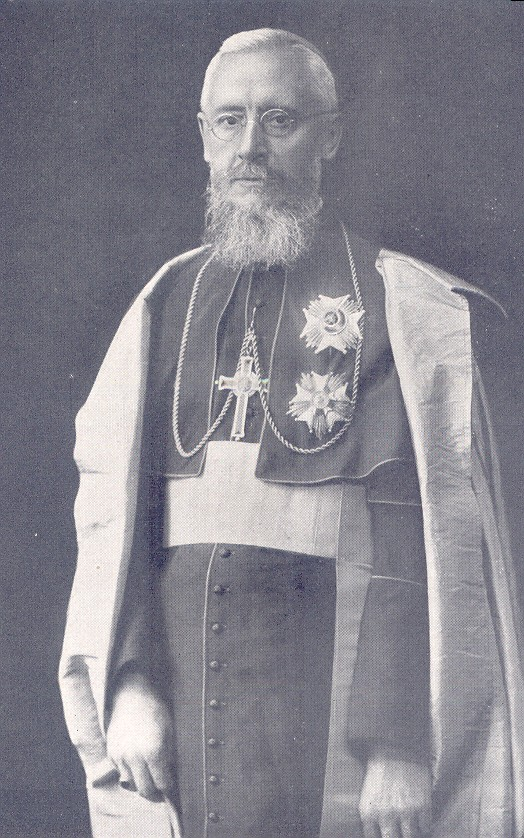
- Ferdinand Perier, third Archbishop of Calcutta (now Kolkata)
- Church: Roman Catholic Church
- Archdiocese: Archdiocese of Calcutta
- Province: Calcutta
- Metropolis: Calcutta
- See: Calcutta (emeritus)
- Installed: 12 August 1960
- Term ended: 10 November 1968
- Predecessor: Brice Meuleman
- Other posts: Coadjutor Archbishop of Calcutta^{(1921–1924)} Titular Archbishop of Plataea^{(1921–1924)} Archbishop of Calcutta^{(1924–1960)} Titular Archbishop of Rhoina^{(1960–1968)}

Orders
- Ordination: 3 October 1909
- Consecration: 21 December 1921 by Archbishop Pietro Pisani
- Rank: Archbishop

Personal details
- Born: Ferdinand Périer; 22 September 1875 Antwerp, Belgium.
- Died: 10 November 1968 (aged 93)
- Denomination: Roman Catholic
- Parents: Felix Joannes Baptista Augustus Perier^{(Father)} Leonia Josephina Ferleman^{(Mother)}

Styles of Ferdinand Perier
- Reference style: The Most Reverend
- Spoken style: Your Grace

Ordination history of Ferdinand Perier
History
Priestly ordination
- Date: 3 October 1909
Episcopal consecration
- Principal consecrator: Archbishop Pietro Pisani
- Co-consecrators: Bishop Santino Taveggia, P.I.M.E., Bishop Louis Van Hoeck, S.J.
- Date: 21 December 1921
Episcopal succession
Bishops consecrated by Ferdinand Perier as principal consecrator
- Bishop Oscar Sevrin, S.J.: 25 July 1934
- Archbishop Louis Mathias, S.D.B.: 10 November 1934
- Archbishop Stephen Ferrando, S.D.B.: 10 November 1934
- Archbishop Joseph Alexander Fernandes: 1 May 1949
- Archbishop Niclas Kujur, S.J.: 9 March 1952
- Archbishop Vivian Anthony Dyer: 9 August 1959

Ferdinand Perier, SJ (22 September 1875, Antwerp, Belgium – 10 November 1968, Calcutta, India), was a Belgian Jesuit priest, a missionary in British India, and the third Archbishop of Calcutta (now Kolkata).

== Early years ==
Fernandus Augustus Maria Josephus Perier was born on 22 September 1875 in Antwerp, Belgium, the son of the wealthy merchant and his wife, Felix Joannes Baptista Augustus Perier and Leonia Josephina Ferleman. After he finished his studies at the Jesuit College in Antwerp, Ferdinand worked for four years in commerce. He did so well with his knowledge of maritime law that, when he decided to join the Society of Jesus on 23 September 1897, he was the director of a successful shipping insurance company.

Perier went through the first two stages of the Jesuit formation, the novitiate in Tronchiennes, a neighborhood of Ghent, between 1897 and 1899, and the juniorate between 1899 and 1900. Then he studied philosophy at the Catholic University of Louvain for three years, between 1900 and 1903. Perier taught for two years, in 1904 and 1905, as a professor of grammar and Flemish at the second Collège Saint-Michel, a Jesuit high school in Brussels.

At his request, Perier was sent to India. He arrived in Calcutta on 9 December 1906. His formation continued with his studies in theology at the Jesuit theological college in Kurseong (1907–1911), where he was also ordained on 3 October 1909. He then went to Ranchi for his Third Year, the last stage of his Jesuit formation. Two years later, in 1911, he was appointed as the Procurator of the Mission and the Secretary of Brice Meuleman, S.J., the Archbishop of Calcutta. His formation finally ended in the next year, on 2 February 1912, when he took his Profession of the Fourth Vow in Ranchi.

== Superior Regular and Coadjutor Bishop ==
In August 1913, Perier became the Superior Regular of the West Bengal Mission as well as the Counselor of the Archdiocese. The next eight years were "the most strenuous years of his life". The First World War began in 1914 and Belgium, the main source of the Mission's funds, was invaded by the Germans so the funds were gone until the Armistice in 1918. It was "a financial coup de force to keep it going" but Perier's experiences as a merchant proved to be invaluable. When the Armistice was signed in 1918, he had already added two churches, one mission station and the whole Assam Mission to the Bengal Mission. But his success came at a great cost. Twenty-one missionaries died and the expenditures were only a third of the Mission's original budget. During his term as the Superior Regular, Perier went to Europe twice – at the end of 1914, after the war began, to attend the General Congregation of the Jesuits and in 1920 to attend the Provincial Congregation of the Belgian Jesuits and to represent Archbishop Meuleman for his ad limina visit to Rome.

On 11 August 1921 Perier was appointed Coadjutor Bishop of Calcutta and received episcopal consecration on 21 December, with the title of Titular Archbishop of Plataea and the right of automatic succession, by Archbishop Meuleman. When health problems forced the Archbishop to resign on 23 June 1924, Perier, being the Coadjutor Bishop, automatically succeeded him as the third Archbishop of Calcutta.

== Archbishop of Calcutta ==
As the new archbishop, Perier was "a firm believer in an Indian clergy and in the papal policy as outlined in Pope Benedict XV’s encyclical on the missions," Maximum illud (Latin, "The Greatest Thing").

- Perier took great care to consolidate and develop the educational and missionary work among the people of the Chota Nagpur Division (Mundas, Oraons and Kharias and others), initiated the mission among the Santals, and supervised the development of new centers in the district of Darjeeling and surrounding areas.
- He created Dioceses of Ranchi in 1927 and Jalpaiguri in 1952.
- He invited many new religious congregations to work in his Archdiocese: the Salesians, the Franciscan Missionaries of Mary, the Sisters of the Apostolic Carmel, the Brothers of Charity.
- In 1937 he organized the first regular meeting of the bishops in India and built with it the structures which became the Catholic Bishops' Conference of India (CBCI) in 1944.
- He was the first mentor of Mother Teresa when she tried to follow her new vocation of service to the "poorest of the poor". Perier obtained the permission from the authorities in Rome to allow her to leave her convent, live in a slum and found the Congregation of the Missionaries of Charity (1950).
- He discreetly pioneered and encouraged inculturation in the seminaries of the Archdiocese.
- He did not hesitate to resign in 1960 when he felt that the time had come for him to hand the Archdiocese over to his successor. He left on 12 August as the Titular Archbishop of Rhoina.
- He went to Rome to participate in the Second Vatican Council (1962–1965) for the first two sessions.

After his retirement, Perier remained in Calcutta from 1960 to 1962, with his own room at his former residence, the "Archbishop’s House" at 30 Park Street, and then moved to Kurseong for three more years, from 1962 to 1965. In 1965, he was back in Calcutta, this time with the rooms at St. Xavier's College, where he died on 10 November 1968.

== Legacy ==
É. R. Hambye, a Jesuit historian, ended his brief biography of Archbishop Perier with the following epitaph:

“Su lemma episcopal, In omnibus quaeram Deum, fue de hecho el de su vida de jesuita y misionero. Hombre muy devoto, asceta y enérgico, paciente y dueño de sí, amó la liturgia y a los pobres y, siempre disponsible y amable, fue verdaderamente un obispo del pueblo." [Spanish, "His episcopal motto, In omnibus quaeram Deum [Latin, "In everything, ask God"], guided his life as a Jesuit and missionary. Devout, ascetic and energetic man, patient and self-possessed, he loved the liturgy and the poor and, always friendly and available, he was truly a bishop of the town."]

== Bibliography ==
- (in English) "Archbishop Ferdinand Périer, S.J. †", Catholic Hierarchy, retrieved 12 December 2013
- (in English) "Mgr. Ferdinand Perier", Catholic Directory of India 1922: 72nd Annual Issue of the Madras Catholic Directory and Annual General Register (Madras: The Catholic Supply Society, 1921), pages 20–21
- (in English) [Lawrence] Trevor Picachy, S.J., A Great Achievement: Episcopal Silver Jubilee Souvenir of His Grace, Dr. Ferdinand Perier, S.J., D.D., Archbishop of Calcutta, December 21, 1921 – December 21, 1946, (Calcutta: Catholic Association of Bengal, 1946)
- (in Spanish) É[douard René] Hambye, S.J., "Perier, Ferdinand", in: Diccionario histórico de la Compañía de Jesús: Biográfico–Temático, Tomo III [Historical Dictionary of the Society of Jesus: By Biography – by Subject, Volume III: Infante de Santiago–Piątkiewicz], eds., Charles E. O’Neill, S.J., Joaquín María Domínguez, S.J. (Madrid: Universidad Pontificia Comillas, 2001)
- (in Spanish) Angel Santos Hernández, S.J., "2.4. Brice Meuleman, Arzobispo de Calcutta", Jesuitas y obispados: Los Jesuitas Obispos Misioneros y los Obispos Jesuitas de la extinción, Tomo II (Madrid: Universidad Pontificia Comillas de Madrid, 2000), page 185

Catholic Church titles
Preceded by Brice Meuleman	3rd Archbishop of Calcutta; 1924–1960	Succeeded by Vivan Anthony Dyer
