= Hermann Jürgens =

The Right Reverend Hermann Jürgens SJ
- Archbishop of Bombay
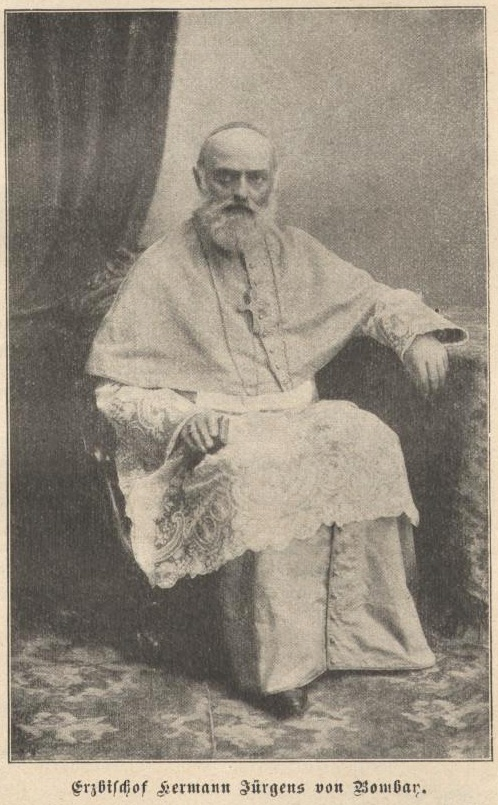
- Native name: Hermann Jürgens
- Church: Roman Catholic Church
- Archdiocese: Archdiocese of Bombay
- Elected: 28 May 1907
- Predecessor: Theodore Dalhoff
- Successor: Alban Goodier

Orders
- Ordination: 1884
- Consecration: 14 July 1907 by Brice Meuleman
- Rank: Bishop

Personal details
- Born: Hermann Jürgens; December 8, 1847 Münster, Kingdom of Prussia
- Died: September 28, 1916 (aged 68) Bombay, Bombay Presidency, British India
- Denomination: Roman Catholic

Styles of Hermann Jürgens
- Reference style: The Right Reverend
- Spoken style: Your Grace

Ordination history of Hermann Jürgens
History
Episcopal consecration
- Principal consecrator: Archbishop Brice Meuleman, S.J.
- Co-consecrators: Bishop Abbondio Cavadini, S.J., Bishop Jean-Marie Barthe, S.J.
Episcopal succession
Bishops consecrated by Hermann Jürgens as principal consecrator
- Heinrich Döring (Doering): 8 December 1907
- Ange-Auguste Faisandier: 30 March 1909
- Carlo Perini: 4 December 1910

Hermann Jürgens was a prelate of the Catholic Church. He was born on 8 December 1846 in Münster, in the province of Westphalia (Kingdom of Prussia) and died on 20 September 1916 in Bombay (India).

He was a German Jesuit priest, missionary in India and archbishop of Bombay from 1907 until his death in 1916.
