= Holy Rosary Cathedral, Kolkata =

Cathedral of the Most Holy Rosary
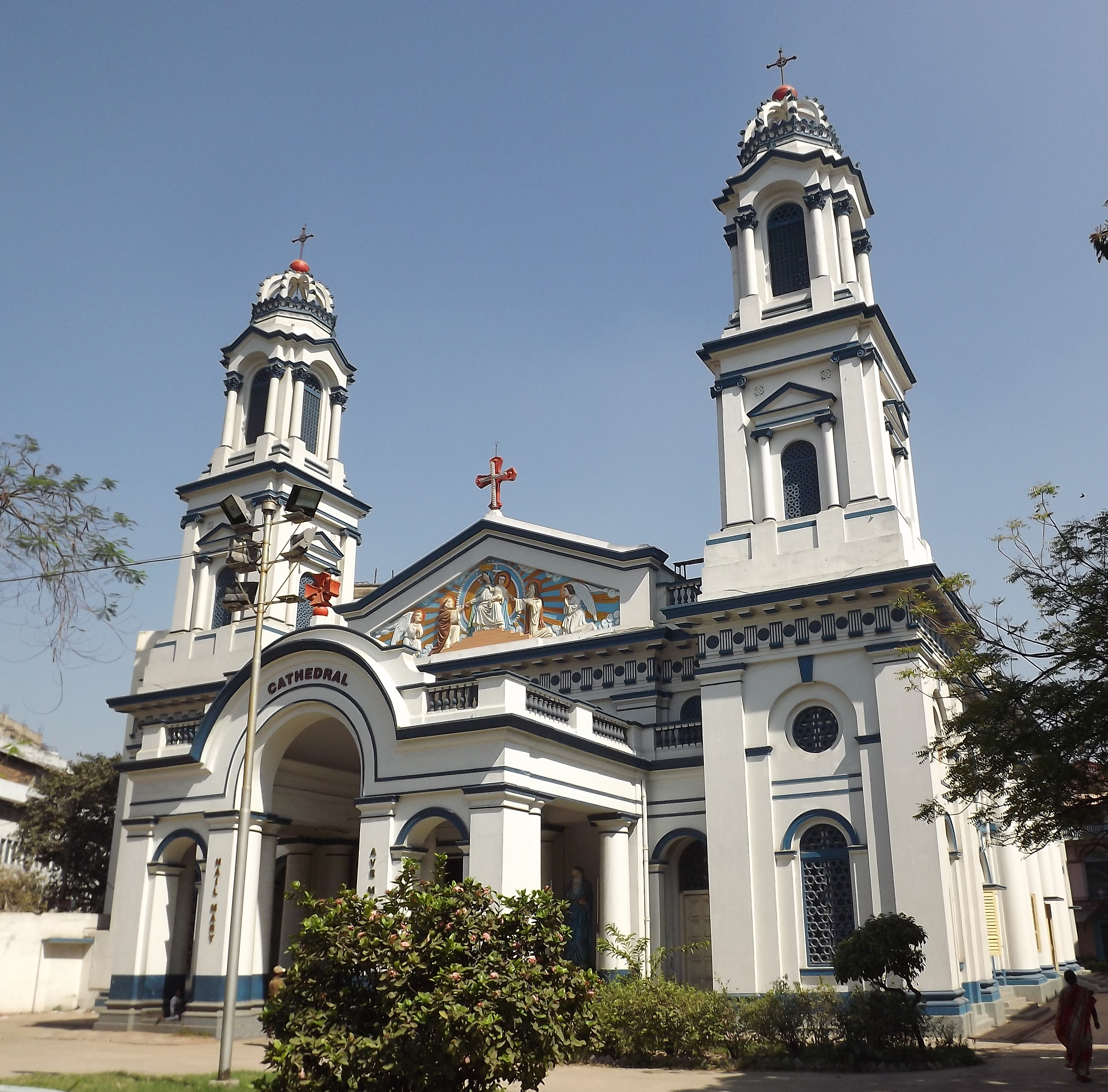
- Cathedral of the Most Holy Rosary
- 22.578664°N 88.352721°E
- Location: Burrabazar, Kolkata
- Country: India
- Denomination: Roman Catholic
- Website: www.archdioceseofcalcutta.in

History
- Status: Cathedral
- Founded: 1797; 229 years ago

Architecture
- Functional status: Active
- Architect: James Driver
- Architectural type: Catholic Church
- Groundbreaking: 1797
- Completed: 27 Nov. 1799
- Construction cost: Rs 90,000

Administration
- Province: Archdiocese of Calcutta
- Archdiocese: Archdiocese of Calcutta

Clergy
- Archbishop: Thomas D’Souza

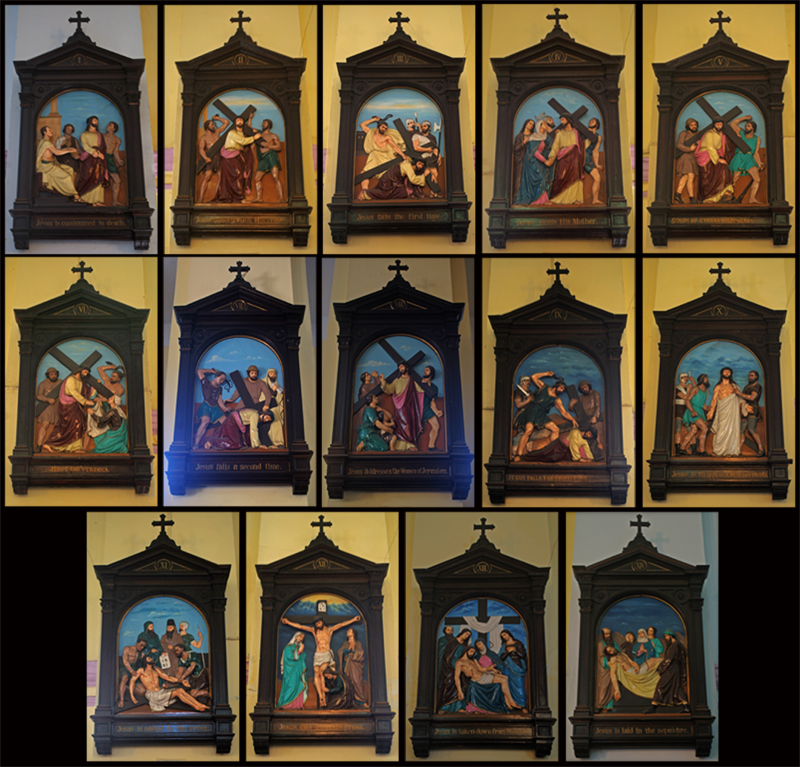
Stations of the cross in Holy Rosary Cathedral (Portuguese Church)

The Cathedral of the Most Holy Rosary (Commonly known as the Portuguese Church) in Burrabazar, Kolkata, is the cathedral of the Roman Catholic Archdiocese of Calcutta. It is also known as the Murgihata Church and was founded in 1799.

The cathedral has a decorated pediment, flanked on either side by two domed towers and an extended portico with an arched entrance way. The interior contains beautiful sculptures including 14 Stations of the Cross. Behind the altar, there are the figures of Madonna and Child. The remains of the first Archbishop of Calcutta lie below the altar.

== History ==
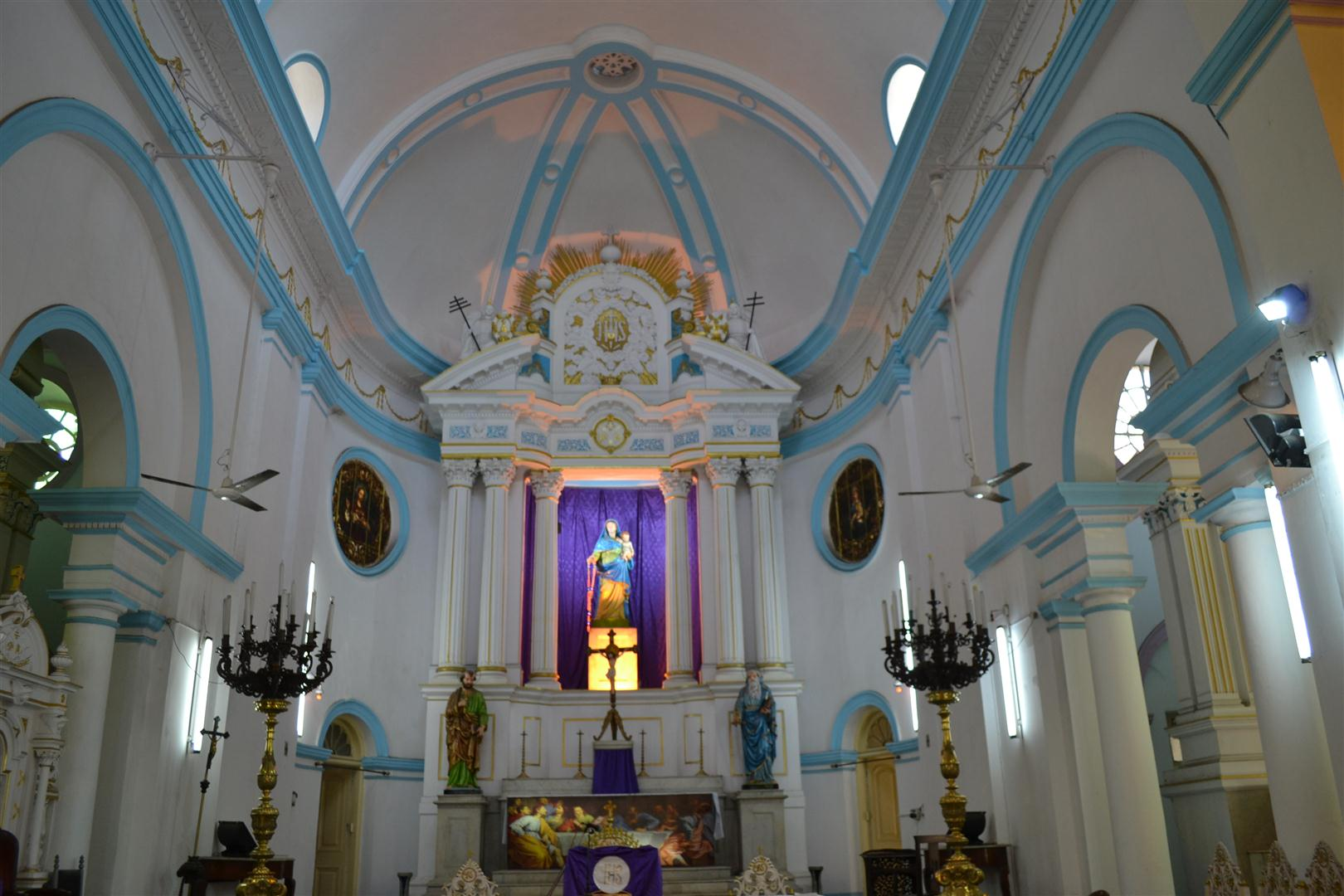
Interior of Holy Rosary Cathedral, Kolkata

The Cathedral of the Most Holy Rosary was founded in 1799. It is the only remaining architectural relic of Kolkata’s lesser-known Portuguese past. Commonly called the Portuguese Church today, the cathedral, painted in a combination of vivid blue and pristine white, still holds services and is currently the seat of the Archbishop of the Roman Catholic Archdiocese of Calcutta.

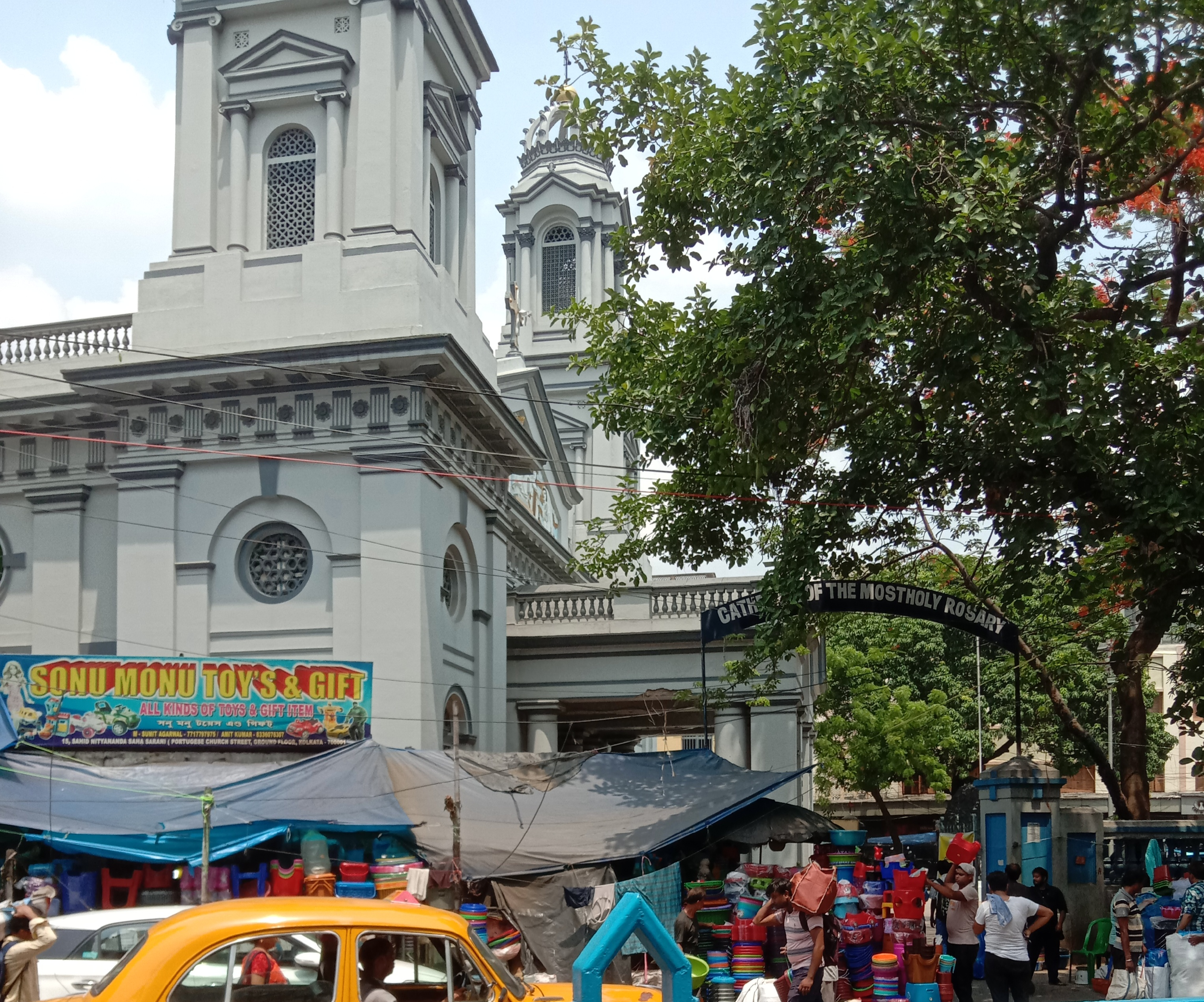
Cathedral of The Most Holy Rosary, as seen from Brabourne road in Bara Bazar, Kolkata.

Originally built as a chapel for Augustinian friars, the Portuguese settlers in 18th-century Kolkata (then called Calcutta) decided to repurpose the building into a new church for the community. With the financial assistance of a wealthy Portuguese trader and philanthropist named Joseph Barretto, the new church was built and consecrated in the 1790s and dedicated to Our Blessed Lady of the Rosary. Situated on Portuguese Church Street and amidst a warren of shops and buildings, the cathedral with its two lofty towers adorned by crown-shaped cupolas is a unique reminder of the city’s highly cosmopolitan past.

The Portuguese had arrived in Bengal as early as the 1530s, starting a trading post in Bandel, now a town in the Hooghly district of West Bengal. The Dutch traders arrived next, followed by the French, while the British were the last to arrive in this part of India. With the establishment of Kolkata as a British settlement at the end of the 17th century, descendants of the early Portuguese traders, mainly of Eurasian heritage, began migrating to the city, their numbers becoming substantial in the mid-18th century. They constructed a chapel and were attended by Augustinian priests. In 1799, the chapel was replaced by the church which is used today as the cathedral.

Gradually, the kaleidoscopic population of the city seemed to have raised the necessity of demarcating specific areas for particular races. Since the Portuguese were the only ones to raise fowl, their quarter came to be designated as Murgihatta (also Murgighata), loosely translated as “poultry quarter,” though the word murgi usually means “chicken” in Bengali. The cathedral too came to be known colloquially as the Murgighata church. It was the main church of the Padroado in Kolkata till 1834, when it became the first parish church of the newly erected Vicariate Apostolic of Bengal. The Salesians took over charge from the Jesuits in 1921 and they, in turn, handed it over to the diocesan clergy in 1972.

Apart from the two towers, the eye-catching exterior of the cathedral is adorned with a decorative pediment rendered in vibrant hues. An arched entrance leads to a colonnaded interior with wooden pews set on either side of the aisle. The main altarpiece, painted white with gold highlights, looks resplendent when light from the circular stained-glass windows set high above filters in. The statue of the Virgin Mary with the infant Jesus occupies pride of place on the massive altarpiece. Another interesting feature of the cathedral is the 14 wooden panels in bas relief, which depict the 14 Stations of the Cross. In 1979, the cathedral annexe was constructed.
