= Goethals Memorial School =

Location
- Kurseong, West Bengal; India
- 26°54′07.23″N 88°17′06.19″E

Information
- Type: Independent co-ed day and boarding secondary school Higher secondary section is also co-ed
- Motto: Latin: Omnia Bene Facere; English: 'Do All Things Well'
- Established: 1907; 119 years ago
- Founder: Christian Brothers
- Headmaster: Br. Miles Allams
- Grades: Class I-XII
- Enrollment: 900+
- Campus: Kurseong
- Colours: Sky blue and dark blue
- Sports: Football, basketball, cricket, volleyball, netball, hockey, track and field, billiards, badminton, table tennis
- Affiliations: Roman Catholic, Christian Brothers, ICSE
- Website: Official Website

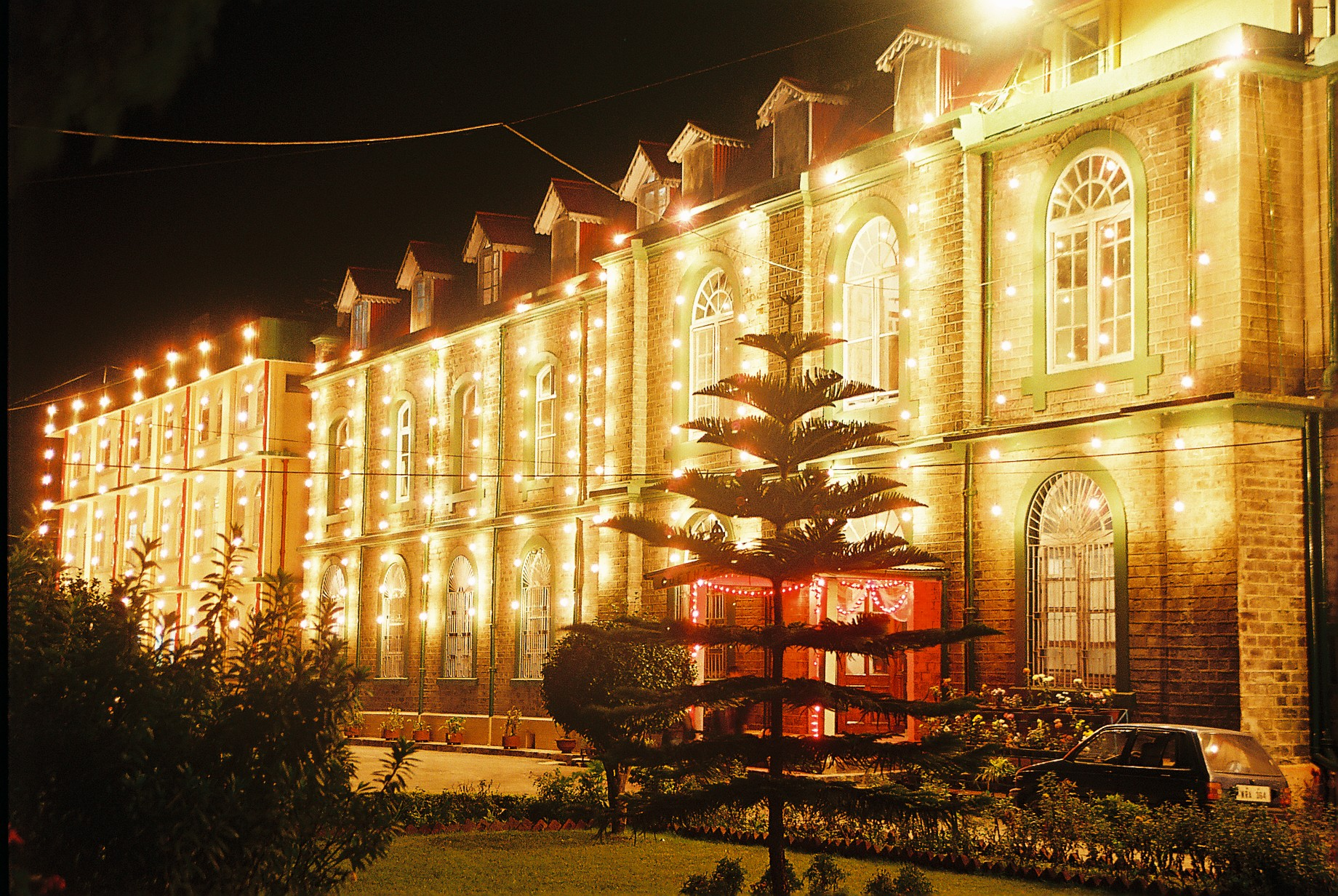
The school is considered to have one of the best campus in India

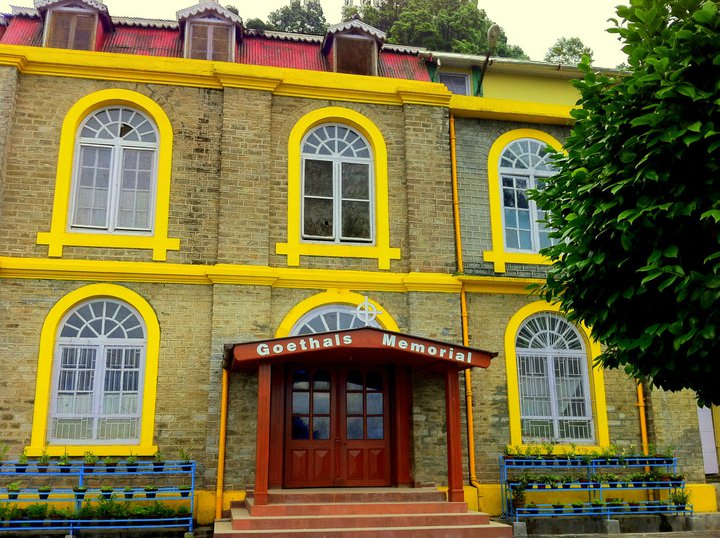
Front of the main school building

Goethals Memorial School is an English-medium boarding school run by the Congregation of Christian Brothers in the town of Kurseong, Darjeeling, India. It is set in a forest 5 km (3 miles) from Kurseong between Siliguri and Darjeeling at an altitude of 1673.854 meters (5491 feet) above sea level.

The school was founded in 1907 and is named after the Jesuit Archbishop of Calcutta (now Kolkata), Paul Goethals. The land for the school was donated by the Maharaja of Bardhaman. The school was previously all boys but the introduction of higher secondary section led to the introduction of girls in the school. Now the school is co-ed even in the secondary section. It has special student leaders called prefects who are elected by the concerned authorities at the start of the academic session. They are given special blue coloured sweaters and coats which are a shade brighter than the rest of the students.

== School anthem ==
The school anthem is "Cheers for Goethals".

== School ranking ==
Goethals Memorial is rated 4.6 out of 5 on the School My Kids school rating and reviews website.

Goethals Memorial School is ranked 398th out of 1914 CISCE Schools in India by Best Schools in India.

== See also ==
- List of schools in West Bengal
