= Joseph Rodericks =

The Most Reverend Joseph Monsignor Rodericks SJ
- Bishop; Archbishop Emeritus of Jamshedpur
- Church: Roman Catholic Church
- Archdiocese: Archdiocese of Jamshedpur
- Province: Ranchi
- Metropolis: Ranchi
- See: Jamshedpur (emeritus)
- Elected: 25 June 1970
- In office: 9 January 1971
- Quashed: 9 January 1996
- Predecessor: Bishop Felix Toppo, S.J.
- Successor: Archbishop Lawrence Trevor Picachy, S.J

Orders
- Ordination: 24 March 1958
- Consecration: 9 January 1971 by Valerian Cardinal Gracias
- Rank: Bishop-Priest
- Laicized: 9 January 1996

Personal details
- Born: Joseph Robert Rodericks; 7 June 1927 Bandra, Bombay Presidency, British India
- Died: 14 July 2010 (aged 83) Mumbai, Maharashtra, India.
- Buried: Cathedral of St. Joseph, Golmuri; 22.7918°N 86.2253°E
- Denomination: Roman Catholic
- Residence: Jamshedpur
- Education: St. Xavier's High School, Mumbai. San Cugat, Spain. De Nobili College, Pane.

Styles of Joseph Rodericks
- Reference style: The Most Reverend
- Spoken style: Your Excellency
- Religious style: Monsignor

Ordination history of Joseph Rodericks
History
Episcopal consecration
- Principal consecrator: Valerian Gracias.
- Co-consecrators: Archbishop Lawrence Trevor Picachy, S.J , Archbishop Pius Kerketta, S.J.

Joseph Robert Rodericks (7 June 1927 – 14 July 2010) was the Catholic bishop of the Diocese of Jamshedpur, India.

== Biography ==
Ordained to the priesthood on 24 March 1958 for the Society of Jesus, Rodericks was appointed bishop on 25 June 1970 and was consecrated on 9 January 1971. He resigned the see on 9 June 1996.
