= Jerman Lepcha =

- Born: 1 May 1910; Namthang, Kingdom of Sikkim
- Died: 1 August 1992 (aged 82); Sikkim, India
- Known for: Democratic Movement of Sikkim

Jerman Lepcha (German Lepcha) was a well known reformist against the Kazi Contractors exploitation of the people of Sikkim. Father of ex Deputy Speaker of Sikkim Assembly Mr. Ram Lepcha and grandfather of Dorjee Tshering Lepcha.

== Early life ==
Jerman was born on 1 May 1910 in Namthang, Sikkim. He was deprived of higher education because of lack of any school in the village but had functional knowledge of Lepcha language and Nepali language. His name became Jerman from Germon, which in lepcha language means yellow by an error.

== Reform ==
Jerman was tormented by the exploitation of the Kazi contractors and hence decided to reform against them. He succeeded in abolishing the trend of carrying Kazis in palanquins by locals. He became part of an underground movement launched by Jainarayan Sapkota, Krishnalal Dahal, Khadanand Dahal, Dharmidhar Dahal and Mahasing Limbu. He also became part of non cooperative movement and encouraged the farmers to keep the lands of the Kazi contractors uncultivated and in famine asked people to loot the food reserves of the Kazi contractors.

== Persecution ==
Jerman was persecuted and tortured by the powerful Kazi contractors. One story says that he was tied in front of a tiger to be killed by it but he fought it bare handed and killed it. Few attempts of assassination of Jerman were also planned but he survived. Kazi contractors framed legal charges against him but failed to prove anything against him.

== Later life ==
Because of Jerman's dedication and contribution to the welfare of the people of Sikkim, he was elected councilor of Sikkim. His work against injustice and suppression are numerous in favor of the people of Sikkim. He is considered a pillar of the democratic movement of Sikkim. His grandson Dorjee Tshering Lepcha is a well known politician of India. His son Ram Lepcha was ex deputy speaker of the Sikkim assembly. Till the end of his life he kept fighting for the rights of people of Sikkim.

== Death ==
Jerman died on 1 August 1992 in Sikkim. Government of Sikkim named a government school in Sikkim after him to pay tribute to him.
