= Édouard Hambye =

Belgian Jesuit missionary priest and scholar (1916-1990)

Father E.R. Hambye in Pune (c1973)

Édouard René Hambye (3 July 1916 – 7 September 1990), was a Belgian Jesuit missionary priest in the Indian subcontinent, and a leading scholar on the history of Indian churches. Hambye is the author of Christianity in India, and a contributor to The St. Thomas Christian Encyclopaedia of India. He was often published under the name E. R. Hambye, and in India was anglicized as "Edward".

== Biography ==
Hambye was born in Mons and attended that city's Jesuit high school. He entered the novitiate of the Society of Jesus on 23 September 1934. The usual spiritual and academic Jesuit training led him to receive sacerdotal ordination on 24 August 1946.

After further studies involving Syriac he was appointed Professor of Church History and of Patristics at the Kurseong Saint-Mary's Jesuit Theologate in West Bengal where he undertook research into the history of Eastern church rites (notably in the Syrian Catholic tradition). His primary field of writing was the Syrian Malabar church. Hambye's History of Christianity in India was well received in the 1970s, but some of his contemporary scholars, such as Stephen Neill, were less impressed.

When work on the St. Thomas Christian Encyclopaedia of India commenced in 1970 by George Menachery he was along with Paul Verghese, later Paulos Mar Gregorios, one of the prominent consultants. He also researched the history of the 'Bengal Jesuit mission' of the Belgian Jesuits and the role of chaplains in the fleet of 17th Century Flanders.

In Kerala Hambye was actively involved in ecumenism between Saint Thomas Christians, Syrian Orthodox and Roman Catholics in India. An active member of the Indian Church Historical Association, Hambye was appointed a member of the commission for dialogue with the Malankara Orthodox Church, Kottayam, 1989. In 1977 he had already been working in Kurseong, Delhi, Poona, Vadavathoor-Kottayam for 26 years.

In later years he was a professor at the Pontifical Oriental Institute in Rome.

== Publications ==
- Hambye, E. R., Eastern Christianity in India; a History of the Syro-Malabar Church From the Earliest Time to the Present Day, (with Eugène Tisserant) The Newman Press, 1957.
- Hambye, E. R., Les traces liturgiques de l'usage du bêmâ dans la liturgie de l' Eglise chaldéomalabare, 1964.
- Hambye, Ed., S. J., L'aumônerie de la flotte de Flandre au XVIIè siècle, 1623–1668, Nauwelaerts, 1967.
- Hambye, E. R., Christianity in India: A history in Ecumenical Perspective, (with H. C. Permulalil), Alleppey, 1972.
- Hambye, E. R., Dimensions of Eastern Christianity, 1976.
- Hambye, E. R., S. J., Some Syriac Libraries of Kerala (Malabar), India, Notes and Comments, 1977.
- Hambye, E. R., Articles in The St. Thomas Christian Encyclopaedia of India, vol. 1 1982.
- Hambye, E. R. History of Christianity in India: Eighteenth Century, (with George Menachery) Church History Association of India, 1997.
- Hambye, Edouard R., 1900 Jahre Thomas-Christen in Indien, (with Johannes Madey) 1983.
- Hambye, Édouard R., "Un Irlandais aux origines de la Mission Navale des Jésuites Belges", Archivum Historicum Societatis Iesu. Roma 15 (1946), pp. 144–154.
- Hambye, E. R., Bibliography on Christianity in India (1976).
