= Namthang =

- Town
- Location in Sikkim, India Namthang (India)
- Coordinates: 27°10′N 88°29′E
- Country: India
- State: Sikkim
- District: Namchi
- Elevation: 1,246 m (4,088 ft)

Languages
  - Official: Sikkimese, Nepali, Lepcha, Limbu, Newari, Rai, Gurung, Mangar, Sherpa, Tamang and Sunwar
- Time zone: UTC+5:30 (IST)
- PIN: 737132
- Vehicle registration: SK
- Nearest city: Namchi, Rangpo
- Climate: sub tropical to alpine (Köppen)

Namthang is a small town in Namchi district of the Indian state of Sikkim. It is located 21.4km distance from Namchi City, the district headquarter of Namchi district. It is located 61km away from the capital city of the state of Sikkim, Gangtok. The nearest city Namchi, Rangpo is 23.3 km away from Namthang towards East. 180° Wide mountain ranges can be viewed from the Town. Namthang is one of the famous tourist destinations in Namchi District. Nagi hill, Tendong hill and Perbing Valley (organic farming) Namthang Bamboo Handicrafts (palitam)are the main tourist point in the area. Tourism, dairy farming, poultry farming and cash crop are the main source of income. Geographical features and road connectivity are the plus points for the people of Namthang.

The major bank in the town is the State Bank of India, Namthang, State Bank of Sikkim, Namthang. ATM available- SBI .

- IFSC CODE : SBIN0009727.
- MCR CODE : 737002522.
