= Lawrence Picachy =

His Eminence Lawrence Trevor Cardinal Picachy SJ
- Cardinal; Archbishop Emeritus of Calcutta
- Church: Roman Catholic Church
- Archdiocese: Archdiocese of Calcutta
- Province: Calcutta
- Metropolis: Calcutta
- See: Calcutta (emeritus)
- Installed: 5 April 1986
- Term ended: 29 November 1992
- Predecessor: Albert Vincent D'Souza
- Successor: Henry Sebastian D'Souza
- Other post: Cardinal-Priest of Sacro Cuore di Maria.^{(1976-1992)}
- Previous posts: Bishop of Jamshedpur.^{(1962-1969)} Apostolic Administrator of Jamshedpur.^{(1969-1970)} Metropolitan Archbishop of Calcutta .^{(1969-1986)} President of Catholic Bishops' Conference of India.^{(1976-1982)} Cardinal-Priest of S. Cuore di Maria.^{(1976-1992)}

Orders
- Ordination: 21 November 1947
- Consecration: 9 September 1962 by Archbishop James Robert Knox
- Created cardinal: 24 May 1976 by Pope Paul VI
- Rank: Cardinal-Priest

Personal details
- Born: Lawrence Trevor Picachy; 7 August 1916 Lebong, West Bengal.
- Died: 29 November 1992 (aged 76) Calcutta, India
- Buried: Jesuit Dhyanashram Cemetery, Thakurpukur. 22.4616°N 88.3062°E
- Denomination: Roman Catholic
- Residence: Calcutta, West Bengal
- Parents: Edwin Pieaehy ^{(Father)} May McCue Pieaehy(Mother)
- Education: St.Joseph College, Dajeerling.
- Motto: Adveniat Regnum Tuum^{(Latin)} Thy Kingdom Come^{(English)}

Styles of Lawrence Trevor Picachy
- Reference style: His Eminence
- Spoken style: Your Eminence
- Religious style: Cardinal
- Informal style: Cardinal
- See: Calcutta (Emeritus)

Ordination history of Lawrence Picachy
History
Episcopal consecration
- Principal consecrator: Archbishop James Robert Knox
- Co-consecrators: Archbishop Pius Kerketta, Bishop Augustine Francis Wildermuth.
Cardinalate
- Elevated by: Pope Paul VI
Episcopal succession
Bishops consecrated by Lawrence Picachy as principal consecrator
- Bishop Denzil Reginald D’Souza: 23 November 1969
- Bishop James Anthony Toppo: 17 October 1961
- Bishop Matthew Baroi, S.D.B: 15 December 1973
- Bishop Linus Nirmal Gomes: 19 November 1977
- Bishop Philip Ekka S.J.: 26 February 1978
- Archbishop Benedict John Osta, S.J.: 21 June 1980
- Bishop John Baptist Thakur, S.J.: 24 June 1940

Lawrence Trevor Picachy (7 August 1916 – 30 November 1992), was an Indian Jesuit priest, spiritual guide of Mother Teresa, and later Archbishop of Calcutta (1969 to 1992). He was elevated to the cardinalate in 1976.

== Biography ==
Cardinal Pichachy was born in Darjeeling of Irish Catholic parents who had immigrated to India in 1911. After completing the Higher Secondary Cambridge course at St. Joseph's School in Darjeeling, Picachy entered the Society of Jesus, more commonly known as the Jesuits, in 1934. Novitiate training in St. Stanislaus College (Jharkhand), was followed by Philosophical studies at Sacred Heart College in Shembaganur. After a stint as a teacher in St. Xavier's Collegiate School, Calcutta, he spent four years at St. Mary College (Kurseong) for the Theological studies preparing for the priesthood. Picachy was ordained to the priesthood on 21 November 1947, and served as a professor and rector of St Xavier's (school and college), in Calcutta, from 1950 to 1960, whence he began pastoral work in Basanti.

On 12 July 1962, Picachy was appointed the first Bishop of Jamshedpur by Pope John XXIII. He received his episcopal consecration on the following 9 September from Archbishop James Knox, with Archbishop Pius Kerketta, S.J., and Bishop Augustine Wildermuth, S.J., serving as co-consecrators. Picachy attended the Second Vatican Council from 1962 to 1965, and was promoted to Archbishop of Calcutta on 29 May 1969. He was later named President of the Indian Episcopal Conference in 1976.

Pope Paul VI created him Cardinal Priest of Sacro Cuore di Maria in the consistory of 24 May 1976. Picachy was one of the cardinal electors who participated in the conclaves of August and October 1978, which selected Popes John Paul I and John Paul II respectively. He resigned his post as Archbishop on 5 April 1986, after sixteen years of service.

The Cardinal died in Calcutta, at age 76. He is buried at the Jesuit Dhyanashram cemetery in Thakurpukur, Calcutta.

== Writings ==
- (in English) (as Trevor Picachy) A Great Achievement: Episcopal Silver Jubilee Souvenir of His Grace, Dr. Ferdinand Perier, S.J., D.D., Archbishop of Calcutta, December 21, 1921—December 21, 1946 (Calcutta: Catholic Association of Bengal, 1946)

Catholic Church titles
| Preceded by none | 1st Bishop of Jamshedpur; 1962–1969 | Succeeded by Joseph Robert Rodericks, SJ |
| Preceded by Albert Vincent D'Souza | 6th Archbishop of Calcutta; 1969–1986 | Succeeded by Henry Sebastian D'Souza |
