= St. Michael's College, Brussels =

School in Brussels, Belgium

Coordinates: 50°50′04″N 4°24′31″E

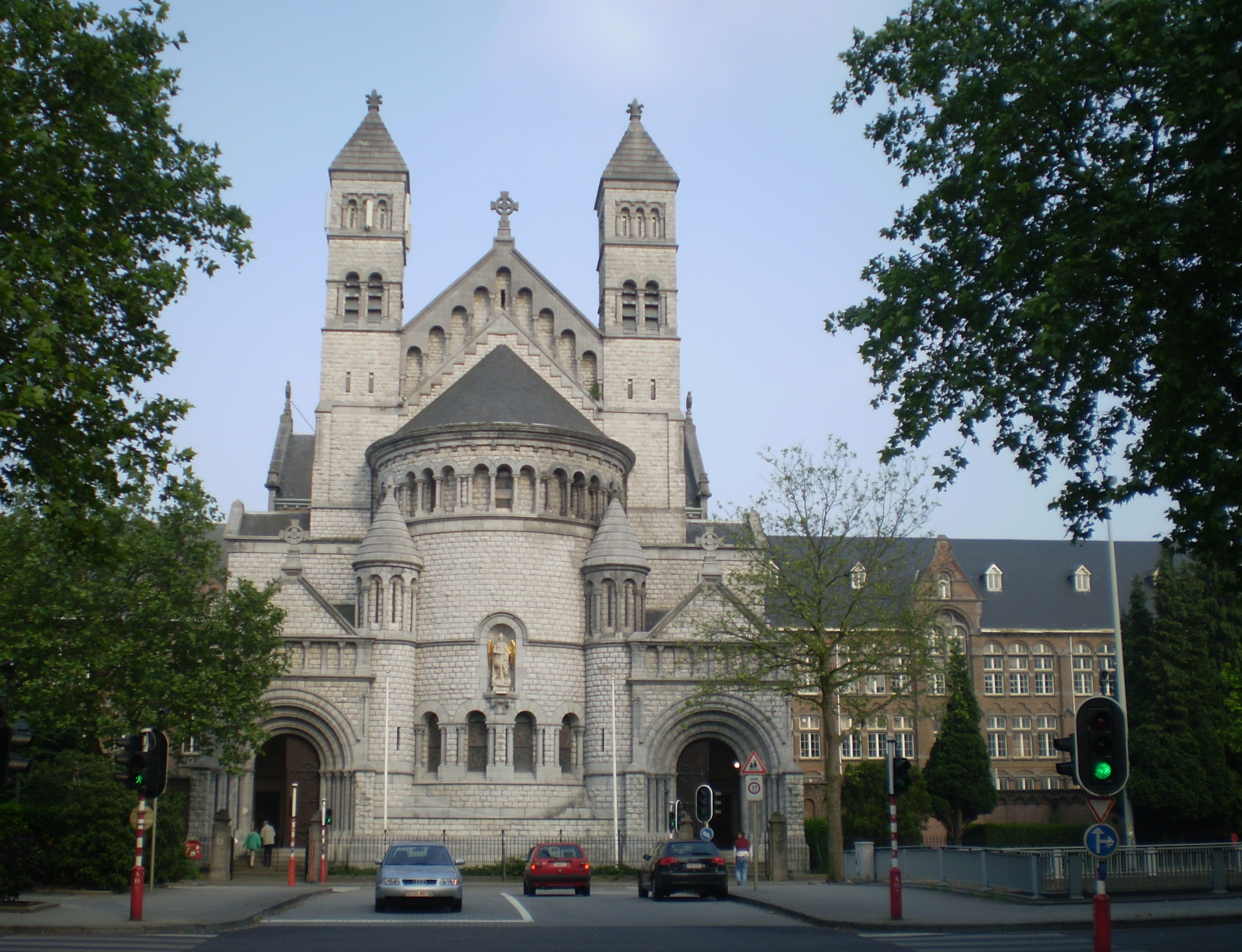
The next door Church of St. John Berchmans with the college in the background

St. Michael's College (French: Collège Saint-Michel and officially known as Centre Scolaire Saint-Michel) is a Catholic secondary school in the Brussels municipality of Etterbeek, Belgium. The school was built in 1905 by the Society of Jesus in order to replace the previous school that had become too small. It is situated next to the Jesuit administered Church of St. John Berchmans.

== History ==
The current St. Michael's College is chronologically the third college to be built:

=== The first college ===
The Jesuits have been in Brussels since 1586. By the request of the Archdukes Albert VII and Isabella, the Jesuits agreed to open a college. Inaugurated on 14 July 1604, the college is composed of a large rectangle formed by the Rue de la Paille/Strostraat, the Rue de Ruysbroeck/Ruisbroekstraat and the Rue d'Or/Goudenstraat. The Jesuits were ejected from the school in 1773 and it was demolished in 1891.

=== The second college ===
In 1814, the Jesuits returned to Belgium and opened the French-speaking St. Michael's College 19 years later in the Chapel Church area of the city. In 1905, the expanding population forced the Jesuits to not only expand the college but to also look for a location for a new college. In 1905, the college on the Rue des Ursulines/Ursulinenstraat was renamed as St John Berchmans College and the new college in the Etterbeek part of the city became St. Michael's College.

=== The third college ===
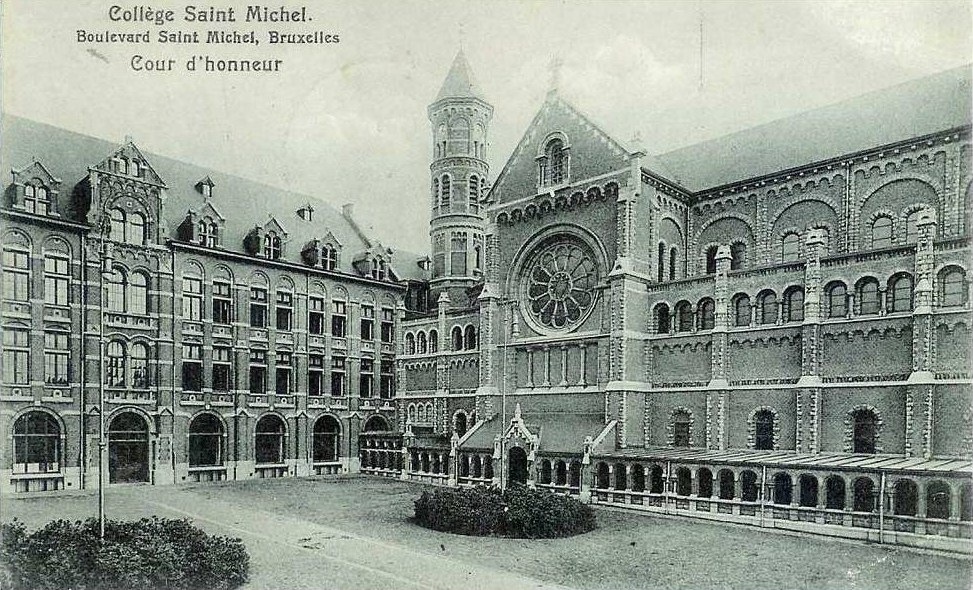
The cour d'honneur (main courtyard) of the college

In 1905, building on the new St. Michael's College was complete and work on the nearby church started. It was built in the same neo-traditional architectural style as the rest of the school buildings. The college welcomed 400 students, of which 100 were boarders, on 3 October of that same year. On 20 July 1908, the foundation stone of the church was laid by Msg. Giovanni Tacci Porcelli, the Papal nuncio to Belgium. The architect Joseph Prémont was inspired by the Rhenan Romanesque tradition of the Middle Ages, especially the Basilica of Saint Servatius in Maastricht. The church was consecrated on 9 July 1912 by the Bishop of Galle, Joseph van Reeth SJ.

Starting in the late 1930s, a shift in language was made which would result in St John Berchmans College speaking Dutch and English and the French-speaking section of the college being transferred to St. Michael's College. The two separate colleges still exist today, each teaching in their respective language.

== Notable students ==
Notable former students the old St. Michael's College:

- Ferdinand Perier (1875–1968), former professor at the college, Archbishop of Calcutta (1924–1960)
- Hubert Pierlot (1883–1963), Prime Minister of Belgium (1939–1945)

Notable former students of the new St. Michael's College:

- Georges Lemaître, (1894–1966), physicist and astronomer, considered the founder of the Big Bang theory
- Paul Grosjean (1900–1964), Jesuit priest and scholar
- André Waterkeyn, (1917–2005), engineer, creator of the Atomium
- Archduke Rudolf of Austria (1919–2010)
- Jacques van Ypersele de Strihou (1936–) Chief of Staff of Kings Baudouin and Albert II
- François Weyergans, (1941–), writer and academician
- Charles Picqué, (1948–), politician
- Olivier Maingain, (1958–), member of the House of Representatives and Mayor of Woluwe-St-Lambert
- Philippe of Belgium (1960–)
- Prince Laurent of Belgium (1963–)
- Olivier Minne, (1967–), television host, producer and actor

== Gallery ==
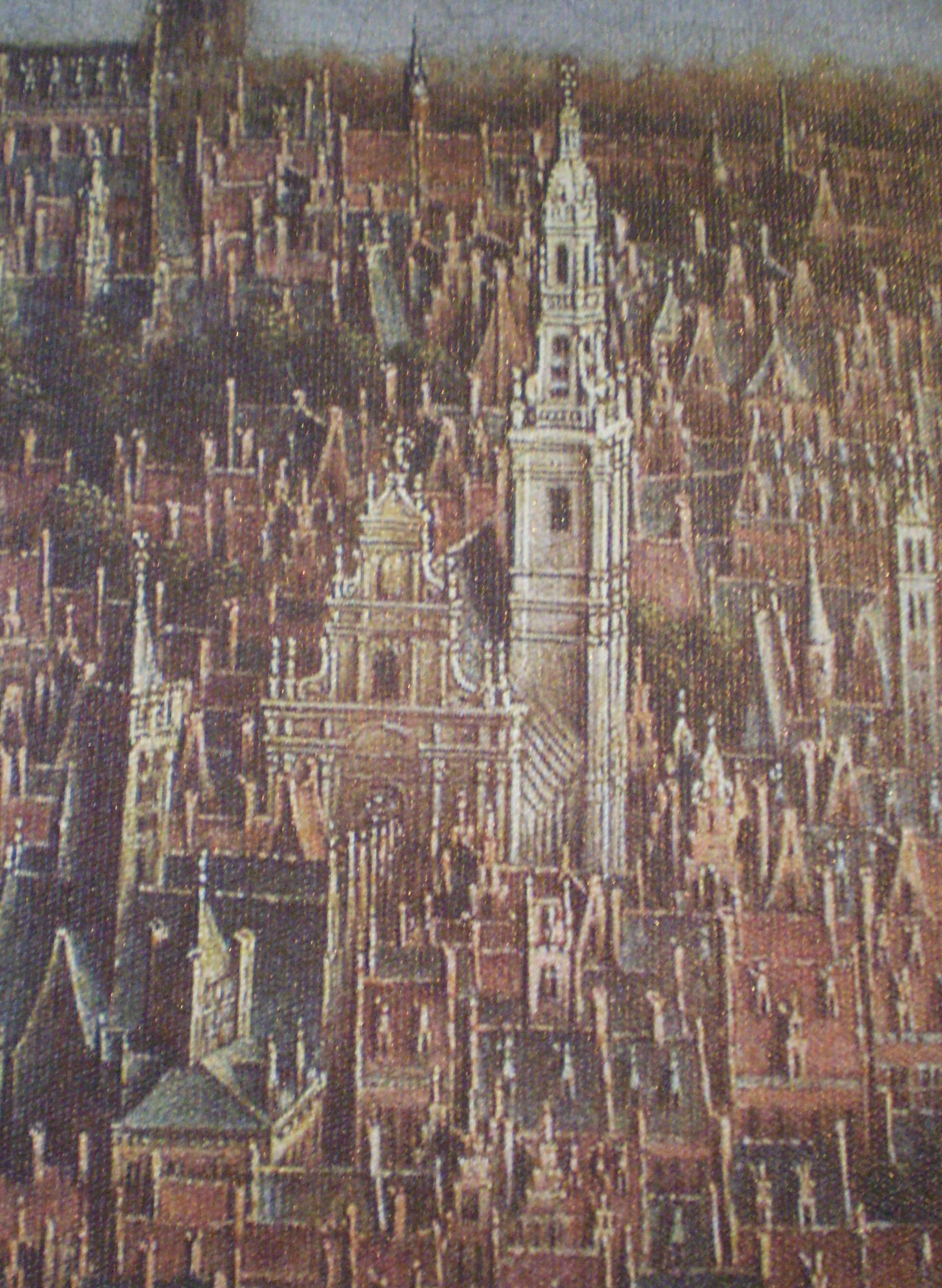
The Jesuit church of 1664 situated next to its original site

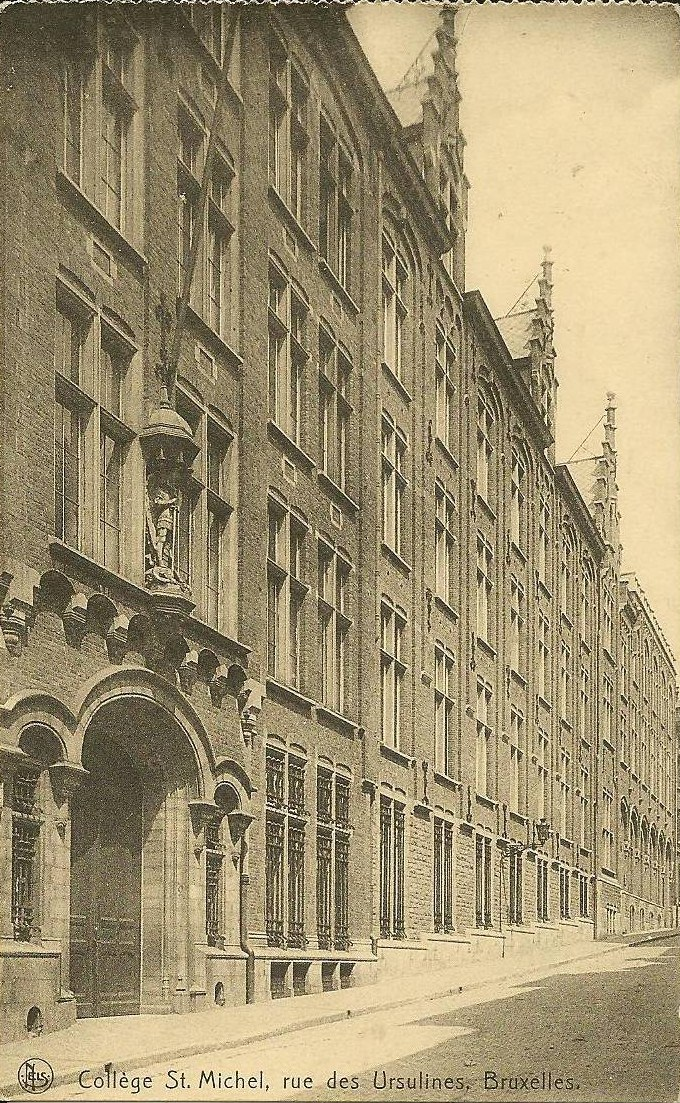
The second college's frontage on the Rue des Ursulines/Ursulinenstraat

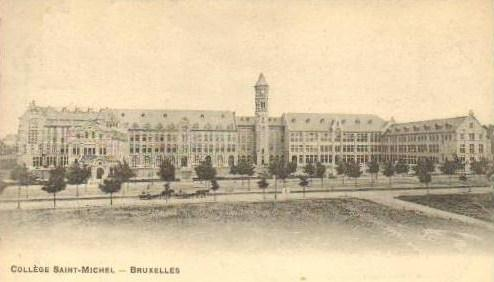
The new school around 1905 without the Church of St. John Berchmans

== See also ==
- List of Jesuit sites in Belgium
- Archdiocese of Mechelen–Brussels
- Saint John Berchmans Church, Brussels
