= Lepcha (beetle) =

Scientific classification
- Domain: Eukaryota
- Kingdom: Animalia
- Phylum: Arthropoda
- Class: Insecta
- Order: Coleoptera
- Suborder: Adephaga
- Family: Carabidae
- Subfamily: Platyninae
- Tribe: Platynini
- Subtribe: Platynina
- Genus: Lepcha; Andrewes, 1930

Genus of beetles

Lepcha is a genus of in the beetle family Carabidae. There are about 14 described species in Lepcha.

== Species ==
These 14 species belong to the genus Lepcha:

- Lepcha bengalensis Morvan, 1997 (India)
- Lepcha bran Morvan, 1997 (Nepal)
- Lepcha cameroni Morvan, 1997 (India)
- Lepcha deliae Morvan, 1997 (Nepal)
- Lepcha gogonasensis (Morvan, 1982) (Bhutan)
- Lepcha heinigeri Morvan, 1997 (Nepal)
- Lepcha holzschuhi Morvan, 1997 (India)
- Lepcha jelepa Andrewes, 1930 (China, Nepal, and India)
- Lepcha lampra Andrewes, 1930 (India)
- Lepcha lassallei Morvan, 1997 (Nepal)
- Lepcha ovoidea Morvan, 1997 (India)
- Lepcha pygmaea (Habu, 1973) (Nepal)
- Lepcha similis Morvan, 1997 (India)
- Lepcha subdiscolus Morvan, 1997 (India)
