= Church of St. John Berchmans, Etterbeek =

Church in Etterbeek, Belgium

Church of St. John Berchmans
- Église Saint-Jean-Berchmans (French); Sint-Jan-Berchmanskerk (Dutch)
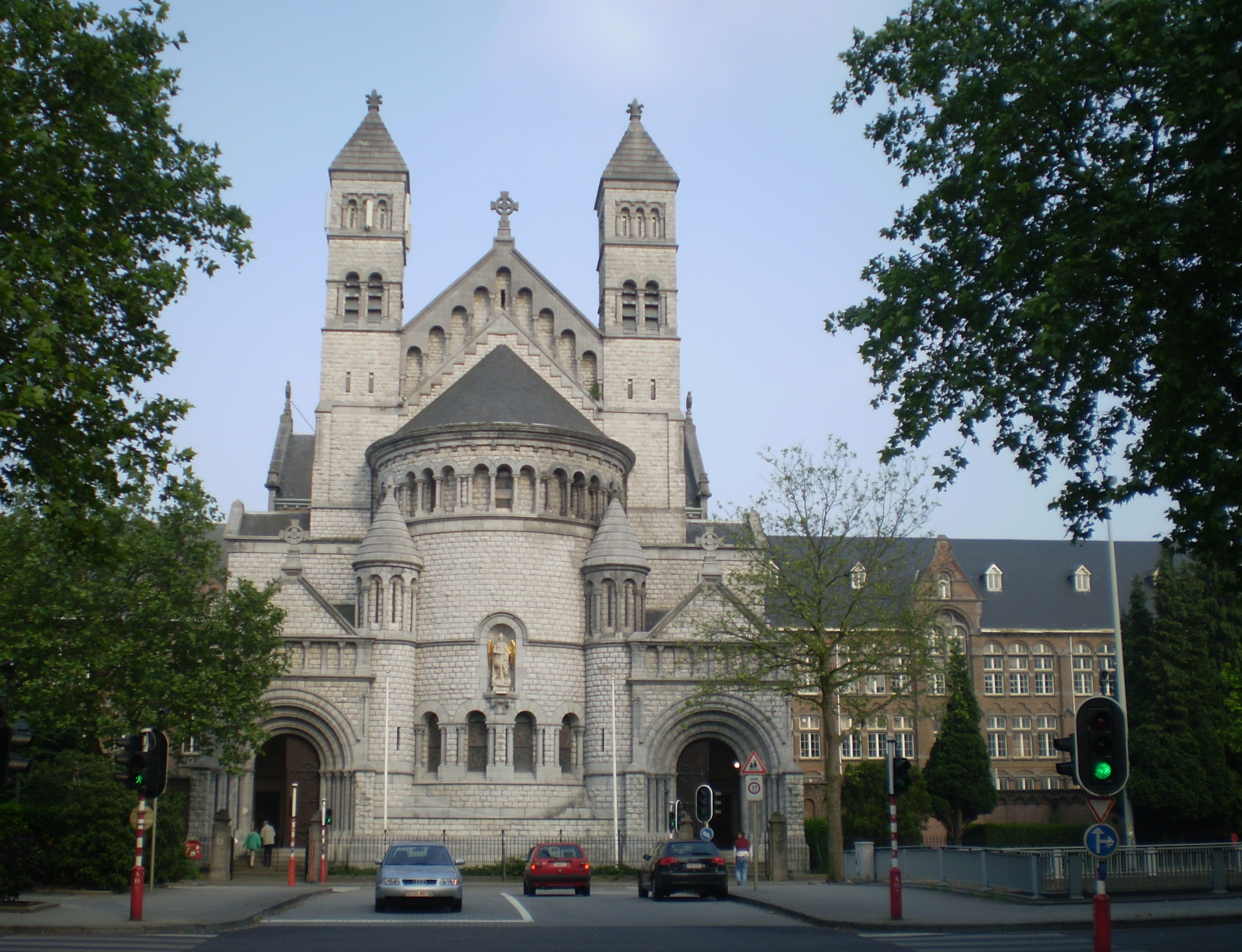
- Rear apse of the Church of St. John Berchmans
- Church of St. John Berchmans
- 50°50′05″N 4°24′26″E
- Location: Boulevard Saint-Michel / Sint-Michielslaan; 1040 Etterbeek, Brussels-Capital Region
- Country: Belgium
- Denomination: Catholic Church
- Sui iuris church: Latin Church
- Website: Official website

History
- Status: Oratory (Note: The church of St. John Berchmans is not a parish church.)
- Founder: Society of Jesus
- Dedication: Saint John Berchmans
- Consecrated: 9 July 1912

Architecture
- Functional status: Active
- Architect: Joseph Prémont
- Architectural type: Church
- Style: Romanesque Revival
- Groundbreaking: 20 July 1908

Specifications
- Length: 60 metres (200 ft)
- Width: 35 metres (115 ft)

Administration
- Archdiocese: Mechelen–Brussels

Clergy
- Archbishop: Luc Terlinden (Primate of Belgium)

The Church of St. John Berchmans (French: Église Saint-Jean-Berchmans; Dutch: Sint-Jan-Berchmanskerk) is the Catholic church of St. Michael's College in Etterbeek, a municipality of Brussels, Belgium. Founded by the Society of Jesus at the turn of the 20th century, the church is dedicated to the Jesuit Saint John Berchmans.

== History ==
The purpose of the church was to form the vital centre of the newly created St. Michael's College. It was built in the same neo-traditional architectural style as the rest of the school buildings. Msg. Giovanni Tacci Porcelli, the Papal nuncio to Belgium, laid the foundation stone of the church on 20 July 1908. The architect Joseph Prémont was inspired by the Rhenan Romanesque tradition of the Middle Ages, especially the Basilica of Saint Servatius in Maastricht. The church was consecrated on 9 July 1912 by the Bishop of Galle, Joseph van Reeth SJ.

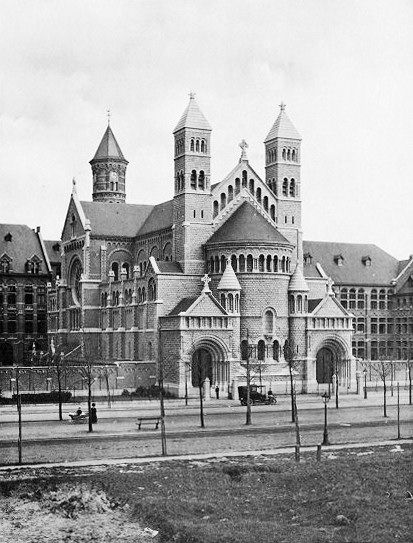
Exterior of the church in 1912, seen from the Boulevard Saint-Michel/Sint-Michielslaan

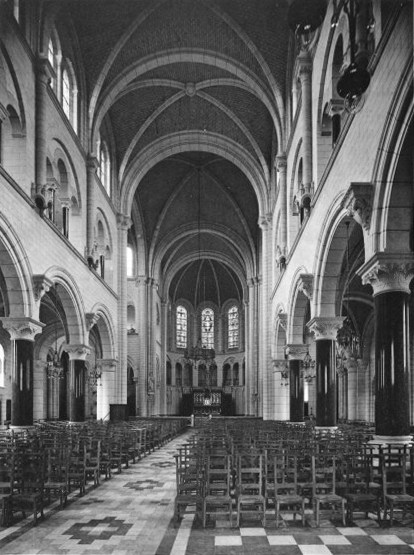
Interior of the church in 1912. The main altar and most of the original furniture has disappeared.

== Exterior ==
The façade, made of grey freestone and rose stone from the Gileppe, is decorated with a statue of Saint Michael the Archangel, patron saint of the college. Two Romanesque entrances on the apse's right and left sides lead to an antechamber.

== Interior ==
The church is built in a Latin Cross plan with a central nave and two aisles, cut by a small transept. The nave on three levels is divided in four spans by two times three monolithic barrelled columns of polished Labrador granite. The capitals, made of white Euville stone, are all decorated with different motifs. The choir ends in a semi-circular apse under a five-sided arch. The back of the church also forms a semi-circular apse, inspired by the style of the Romanesque churches of the Rhine region.

Suspended above the columns of the nave, six statues of saints of the Society of Jesus rest on pedestals with their carved initials. On the left, towards the main altar are Saint Alphonsus Rodriguez, Saint Francis de Geronimo, and Saint Stanislaus Kostka. On the right are Saint Peter Claver, Saint Aloysius Gonzaga, and Saint Francis Borgia. The statues of Saint Alphonsus Rodriguez and Saint Peter Claver are by the sculptor C. Van de Cappele. The others are by another sculptor, Oscar Sinia.

In 1968, after the Second Vatican Council and the liturgical reforms that followed, several transformations of the interior arrangement were carried out. Much of the original furniture has disappeared. The main altar, made from drawings by the architect Joseph Prémont, was surmounted by a tabernacle set up in a retable decorated with copper statuettes. The altar was presented in the Brussels International Exposition of 1910.

=== Stained windows ===
The stained glass of the lower windows was made by the workshop of Camille Ganton-Defoin in Ghent. They depict the important events of life of Jesus. The stained windows of the choir came from the workshop of Stalins in Antwerp. They represent the Holy Trinity, in the centre, surrounded by the Four Evangelists (Matthew, Mark, Luke, and John), the Four Church Fathers (Saint Gregory the Great, Saint Augustine, Saint Ambrose, and Saint Jerome) and the eight saints of the Society of Jesus.

The transept rose window on the right is dedicated to Belgium with Saint Joseph, the country's patron saint, surrounded by Belgian saints or saints venerated in different Belgian cities. The rose window on the left depicts the Tree of Jesse with the Virgin Mary surrounded by personages of the Old Testament.

=== Organ ===
The church's Romantic organ is the work of the organ-builder Jean-Emile Kerkhoff. Built between 1909 and 1910, the organ has three keyboards, a pedal board, and 36 organ stops. It was inaugurated on 6 April 1910 by a performance of Charles-Marie Widor.

== See also ==
- List of Jesuit sites in Belgium
- List of churches in Brussels
- Catholic Church in Belgium
- History of Brussels
- Culture of Belgium
- Belgium in the long nineteenth century
