= Hildamit Lepcha =

Musical artist of Lepcha folk music

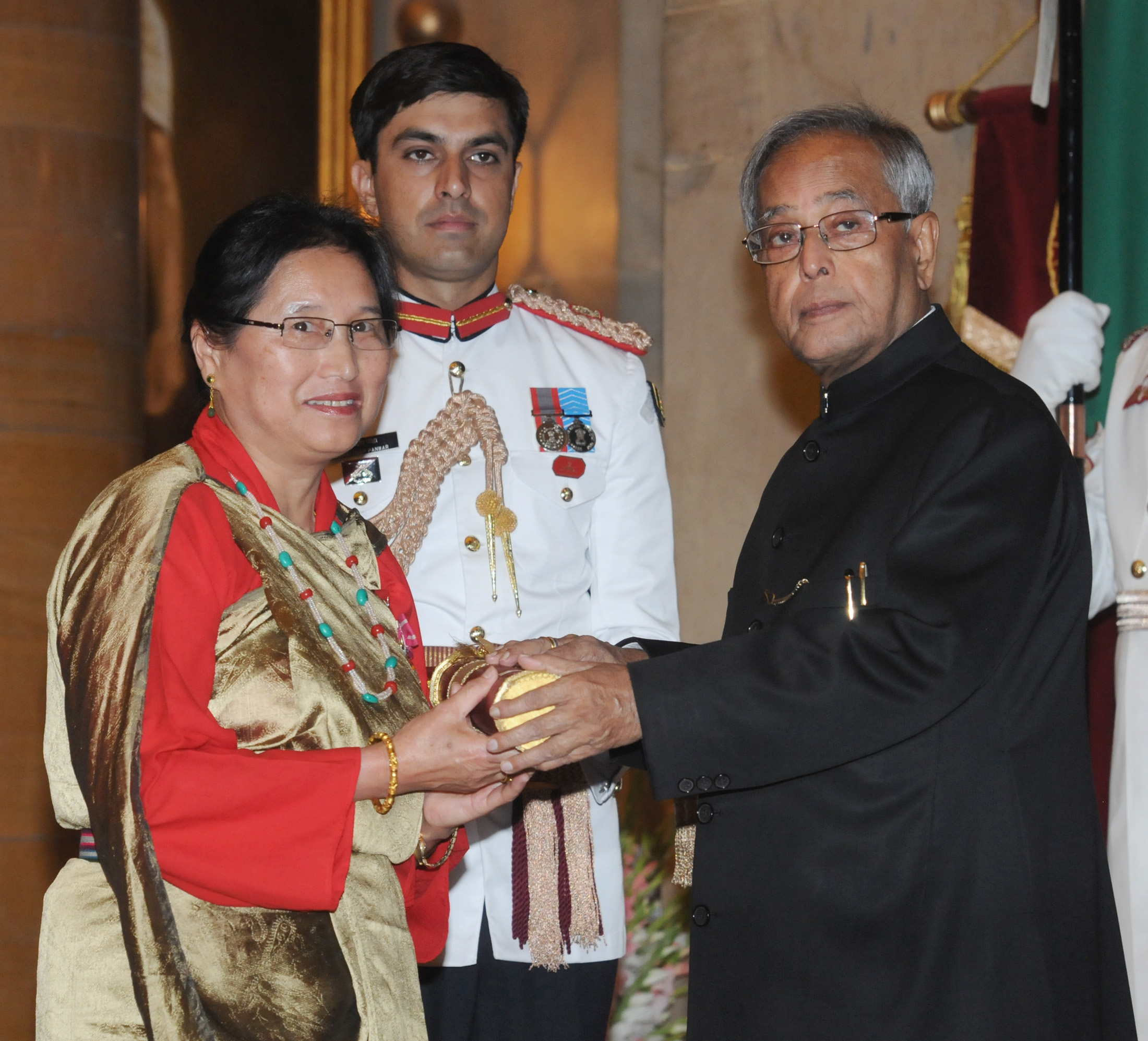
- The President, Pranab Mukherjee presenting the Padma Shri Award to Smt. Hildamit Lepcha, in New Delhi on April 20, 2013

Background information
- Born: 1956 (age 69–70); Kalimpong, Darjeeling District, West Bengal
- Genres: folk
- Occupation: Singer
- Years active: 1970–present

Hildamit Lepcha is an exponent of Lepcha folk music. She is a recipient of Padma Shri Award in 2013. Hildamit has excelled as a performer of traditional Lepcha musical instruments as well as Lepcha songs.

== Early life ==
Hildamit Lepcha was born in 1956 in Kalimpong in Darjeeling district of West Bengal.
