= Diocese of Darjeeling =

Latin Catholic jurisdiction in India

Coordinates: 27.0464°N 88.2643°E

Diocese of Darjeeling Dioecesis Darieelingensis दार्जिलिंग धर्मप्रांत
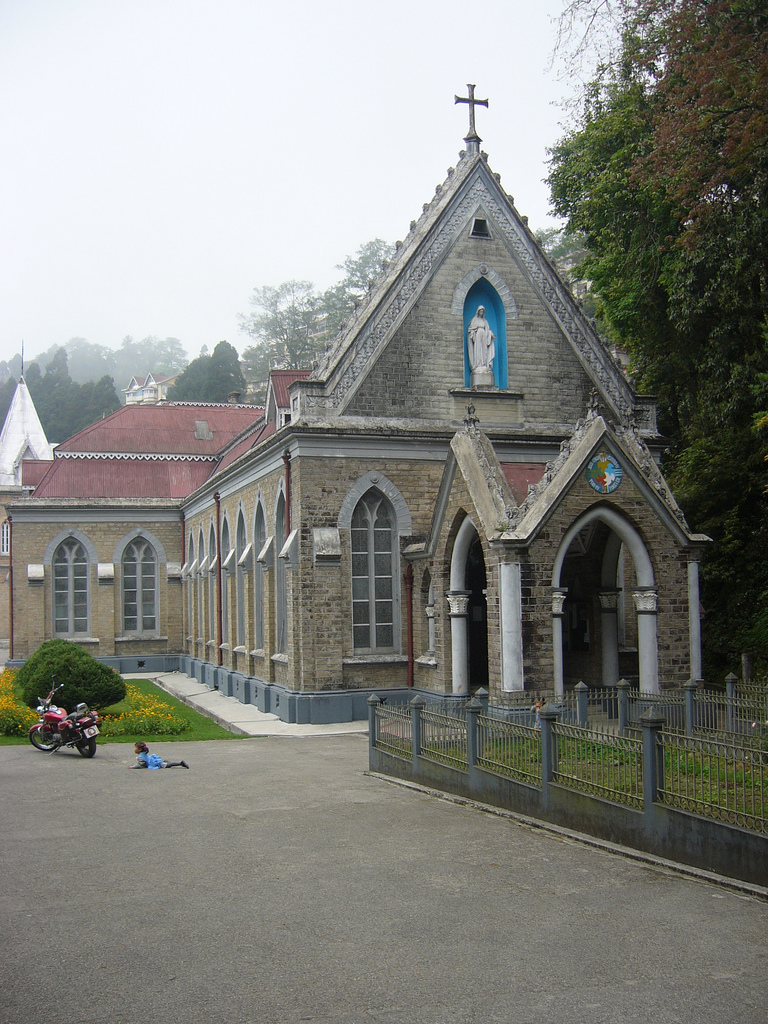
- Immaculate Conception Cathedral in Darjeeling

Location
- Country: India; Bhutan
- Ecclesiastical province: Calcutta

Statistics
- Area: 10,880 km^{2} (4,200 sq mi)
- Population: Total; Catholics: (as of 2021); 2,331,153; 37,320 (2.4%)
- Parishes: 60

Information
- Denomination: Catholic Church
- Sui iuris church: Latin Church
- Rite: Roman Rite
- Established: 15 February 1929; 97 years ago (as a Mission Sui Iuris)
- Cathedral: Immaculate Conception Cathedral in Darjeeling
- Secular priests: 147

Current leadership
- Pope: Leo XIV
- Bishop: Most Rev. Stephen Lepcha
- Metropolitan Archbishop: Thomas D'Souza

The Diocese of Darjeeling is a Latin Church ecclesiastical jurisdiction or diocese of the Catholic Church in India. It is a suffragan in the ecclesiastical province of the metropolitan Archdiocese of Calcutta, yet depends on the missionary Dicastery for Evangelization. It includes within its territory the independent Himalayan country of Bhutan, where Christianity is practiced by a tiny minority and proselytism is forbidden by non-Bhutanese.

The cathedral episcopal see is the Marian Immaculate Conception Cathedral, in Darjeeling, West Bengal state, India.

== Statistics ==
New data from the Annuario Pontifico 2022 reveals as of 2021, it pastorally served 37,320 Catholics (2.4% of 1,535,370 total) on 9,521 km^{2} in 60 parishes and missions with 147 priests (83 diocesan, 64 religious), 384 lay religious (98 brothers, 286 sisters).

== History ==
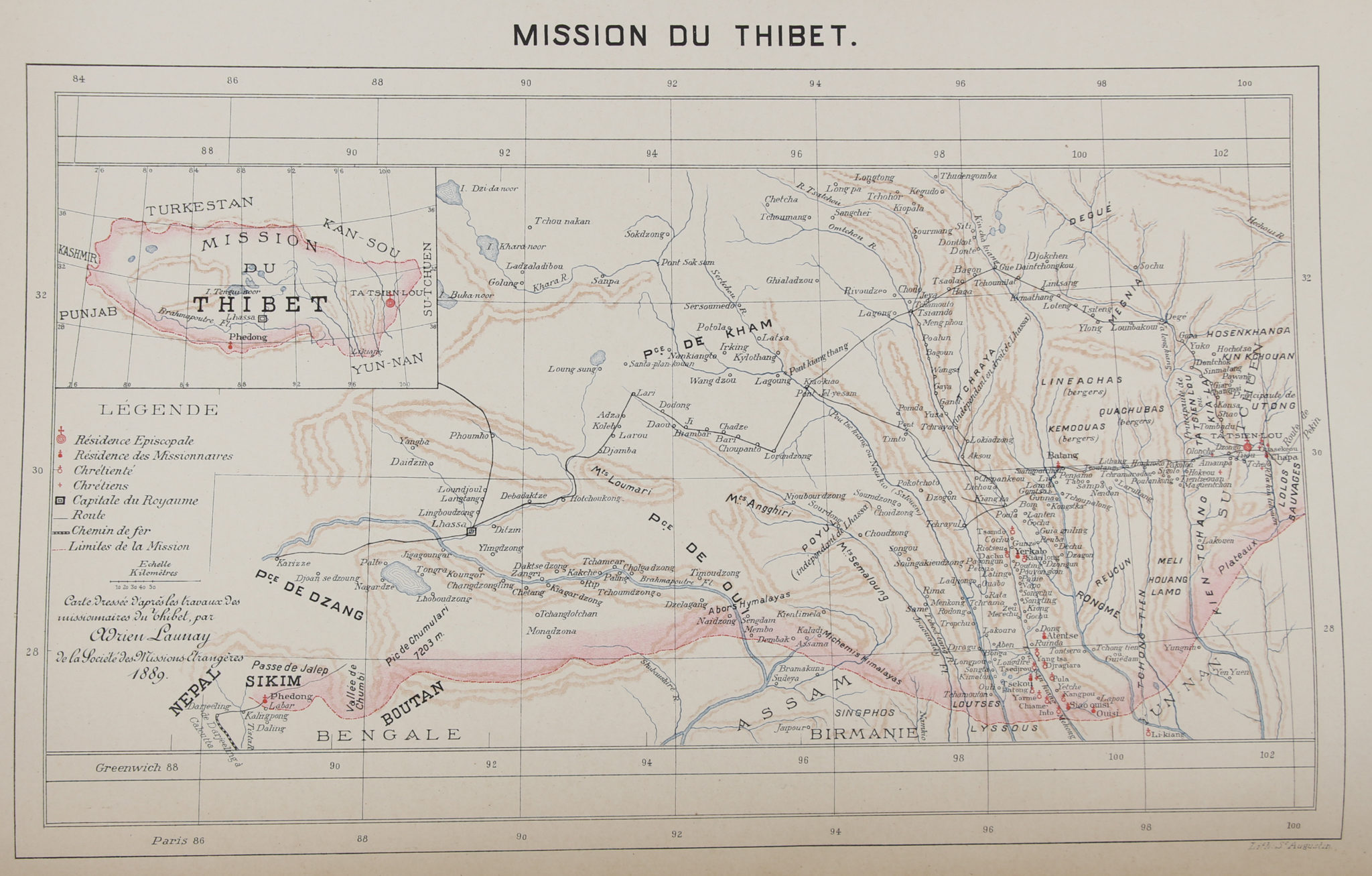
Sikkim (spelled Sikim in the map) was part of the Apostolic Vicariate of Tibet until 1929. This vicariate was renamed Tatsienlu in 1924.

Episcopal oversight for the area was established on 15 February 1929 as Mission sui juris of Sikkim, on territories split off from Metropolitan Archdiocese of Calcutta and Apostolic Vicariate of Tatsienlu) It was then promoted on 16 June 1931 as Apostolic Prefecture of Sikkim On 8 August 1962, it was raised up to diocean status as Diocese of Darjeeling. In 1975, Pope Paul VI split episcopal juristiction over Bhutan from the Diocese of Tezpur and transferred it to the Diocese of Darjeeling. The diocese lost territory on 14 June 1997, that was split off to establish the Diocese of Bagdogra. In 1995, the first native Bhutanese priest was ordained by the Diocese.

== Ordinaries ==
The following excercised episcopal oversight of the Diocese of Darjeeling and its predecessors:

Ecclesiastical Superior of Sikkim

- Father Jules Elmire Douénel, Paris Foreign Missions Society (M.E.P.) (born France) (19 February 1929 – 16 June 1931 see below)

Apostolic Prefects of Sikkim

- Father Jules Elmire Douénel, M.E.P. † (see above 19 February 1929 – retired 16 June 1931)
- Father Aurelio Gianora, C.R.S.M.A. † (d. 31 Dec 1995) (14 May 1937 – resigned 8 August 1962)

Suffragan Bishops of Darjeeling

- Most Rev. Eric Benjamin (born India) (8 August 1962 – died 12 May 1994)
- Most Rev. Stephen Lepcha (born India) (14 June 1997 – Present)

== See also ==
- Catholic Church in India
- Catholic Church in Bhutan
- Catholic Church in Tibet
- List of Catholic dioceses in India

== Sources and external links ==
- GCatholic.org with incumbent bio links - data for all sections
- www.catholic-hierarchy.org - Statistics on the Diocese of Darjeeling
