= Thomas D'Souza =

Indian priest

The Most Reverend Thomas D'Souza
- Archbishop Emeritus of Calcutta
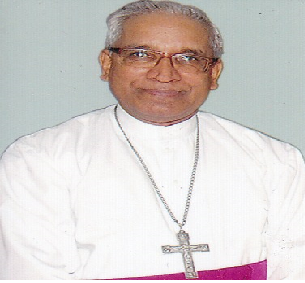
- Archbishop Emeritus Thomas D'Souza
- See: Roman Catholic Archdiocese of Calcutta
- Appointed: 23 February 2012
- Installed: 23 February 2012
- Term ended: 20 September 2025
- Predecessor: Lucas Sirkar SDB
- Successor: Elias Frank
- Other post: Member of the Commission for Education of the Catholic Bishops' Conference of India
- Previous post: Coadjutor Archbishop of Calcutta Roman Catholic Archdiocese of Calcutta

Personal details
- Born: 26 August 1950 (age 76) Adyarpadav, Karnataka, India
- Residence: Our Lady of Lourdes Church, Barasat, West Bengal, India
- Motto: Latin: Unitas et Amor, lit. 'Unity and Love'

Styles of Thomas D’Souza
- Reference style: The Most Reverend
- Spoken style: Your Excellency
- Religious style: Monsignor
- Posthumous style: not applicable

Ordination history of Thomas D'Souza
History
Priestly ordination
- Date: 16 April 1977
Episcopal consecration
- Consecrated by: Henry Sebastian D'Souza
- Date: 25 January 1998
Episcopal succession
Bishops consecrated by Thomas D'Souza as principal consecrator
- Shyamal Bose: 20 June 2019

Archbishop Thomas D'Souza is the Emeritus Archbishop of Calcutta and member of the Commission for Education of the Catholic Bishops' Conference of India.

== Early life ==
He was born in Adyarpadav, Mangalore, Karnataka on 26 Aug 1950. He was baptised at Holy Family Church, Omzoor.

He did his primary education from St. Ligorious Higher Primary school.

== Priesthood ==
He was ordained a Catholic priest on 16 Apr 1977.

== Episcopate ==
He was appointed by Pope John Paul II as Bishop of Bagdogra on 14 June 1997 and was consecrated on 25 January 1998. He was Appointed Coadjutor Archbishop of Calcutta on 12 March 2011 by Pope Benedict XVI. He succeeded as Archbishop of Calcutta on 23 February 2012. His term ended on 20 September 2025 following his retirement.
