= Henry Sebastian D'Souza =

Indian Roman Catholic bishop (1926–2016)

- Archbishop of Calcutta
- Church: Catholic Church
- Archdiocese: Archdiocese of Calcutta
- In office: 5 April 1986 – 2 April 2002
- Predecessor: Lawrence Picachy
- Successor: Lucas Sirkar
- Previous posts: Coadjutor Archbishop of Calcutta (1985-1986); Archbishop of Cuttack-Bhubaneswar (1974-1985)

Orders
- Ordination: 24 August 1948
- Consecration: 5 May 1974 by John Gordon

Personal details
- Born: 20 January 1926 Igatpuri, Presidency of Bombay, British Raj, British Empire
- Died: 27 June 2016 (aged 90) Kolkata, West Bengal, India

Henry Sebastian D'Souza (20 January 1926 – 27 June 2016) was an Indian Roman Catholic bishop.

Born in Igatpuri, D'Souza was ordained a priest in 1948. He became Bishop of Cuttack-Bhubaneswar in 1974 and was named coadjutor Archbishop of Calcutta in 1985. D'Souza retired in 2002 as Archbishop of Calcutta and started the Life Ascending- a monthly newsletter for the elderly. He died at the age of 90 in 2016 at Vianney Home, Kolkata. He was the Archbishop of Calcutta (Kolkata) when Saint Mother Teresa was in her later years and upon her death in the year 1997, helped initiate and support her sainthood.
