= Archdiocese of Calcutta =

Roman Catholic archdiocese in West Bengal, India

Coordinates: 22°34′N 88°21′E

Archdiocese of Calcutta Archidioecesis Calcuttensis কলকাতার বিশপের এলাকা
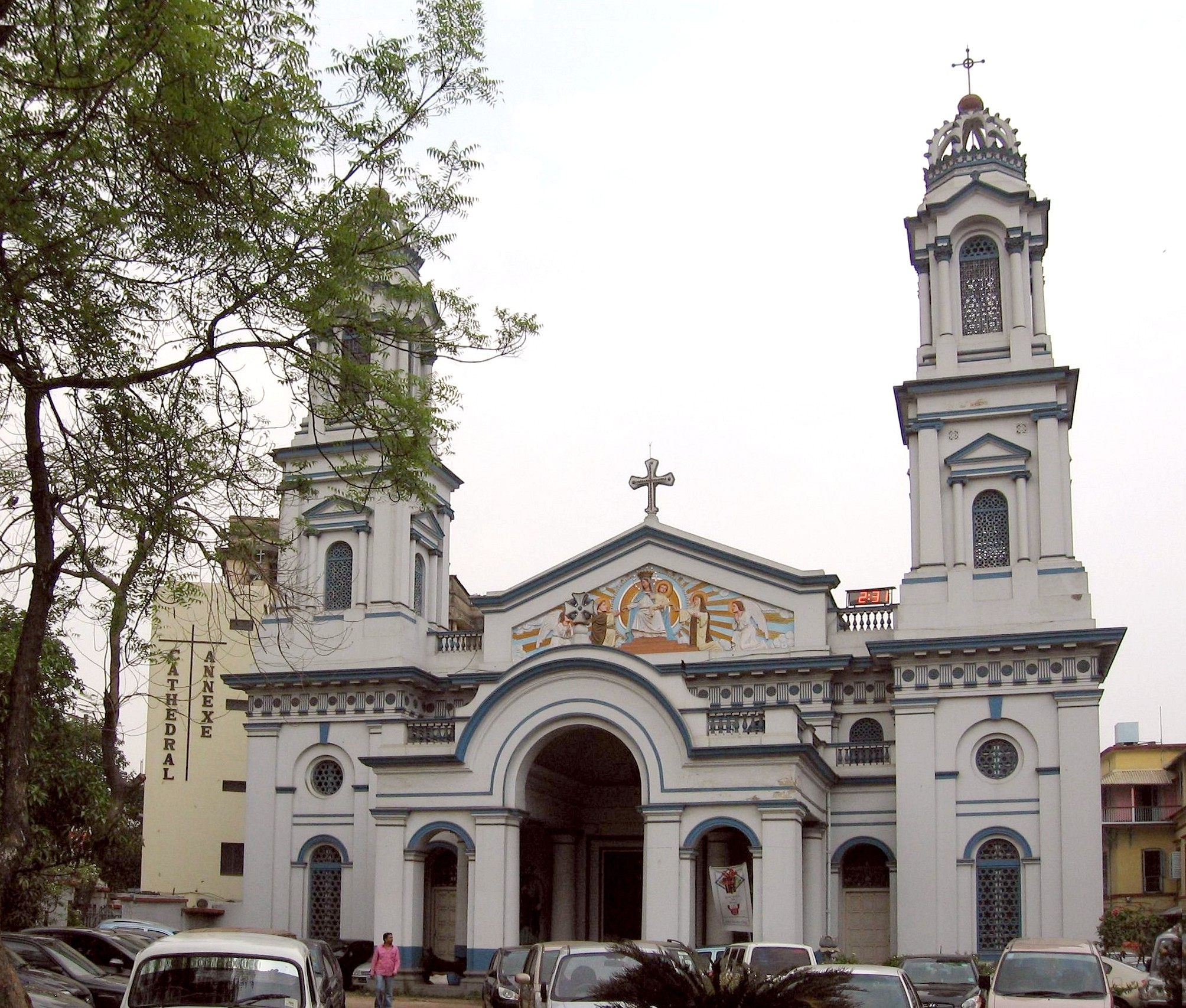
- Cathedral of the Most Holy Rosary

Location
- Country: India
- Ecclesiastical province: Calcutta

Statistics
- Area: 11,532 sq mi (29,870 km^{2})
- Population: Total; Catholics: (as of 2023); 49,010,000; 177,354 (0.4%)
- Parishes: 55

Information
- Denomination: Catholic
- Sui iuris church: Latin Church
- Rite: Roman Rite
- Established: 18 April 1834; 192 years ago
- Cathedral: Cathedral of the Most Holy Rosary
- Patron saint: St Francis Xavier, St Teresa of Calcutta

Current leadership
- Pope: Leo XIV
- Metropolitan Archbishop: Elias Frank
- Bishops emeritus: Thomas D'Souza

Website
- Website of the Archdiocese

The Roman Catholic Metropolitan Archdiocese of Calcutta (Latin: Archidioecesis Calcuttensis) is an ecclesiastical Latin Church territory of the Catholic Church in India.

== History ==
The archdiocese was originally erected as the Apostolic Vicariate of Bengal in 1834 by Pope Gregory XVI, and renamed as the Apostolic Vicariate of Western Bengal in 1850 by Gregory's successor, Pope Pius IX.

On 1 September 1886, when the Catholic hierarchy was created in British India by Pope Leo XIII, the vicariate was elevated to the rank of metropolitan archdiocese and renamed as the "Archdiocese of Calcutta".

Over the course of times the archdiocese was frequently divided and new metropolitan provinces were created: Ranchi, Guwahati and Patna. As of 2020, the metropolitan province of Calcutta covers the state of West Bengal. The suffragan sees are: Asansol, Bagdogra, Baruipur, Darjeeling, Jalpaiguri, Krishnagar and Raiganj.

The archdiocese's cathedral, the seat of its archbishop, is the Cathedral of the Most Holy Rosary, commonly called the "Portuguese Church". Calcutta also houses the oldest Catholic church in the area, the Basilica of the Holy Rosary, in Bandel - a former Portuguese settlement - some 40 kilometers (25 miles) north of the city of Kolkata.

The current archbishop of Calcutta is Elias Frank, having been appointed by Pope Leo XIV on 20 September 2025.

== Territory ==
The archdiocese of Calcutta currently covers the Districts of Bankura, Howrah, Hooghly, Kolkata, Paschim Medinipur, Purba Medinipur and North 24 Parganas in the state of West Bengal.

== List of Ordinaries of Calcutta ==
=== Apostolic vicars of Bengal ===
- 1834 - 1838 : Robert Saint–Leger
- 1838 - 1840 : Jean-Louis Taberd
- 1840 - 1850 : Patrick Joseph Carew

=== Apostolic vicars of West Bengal ===
- 1850 - 1855 : Patrick Joseph Carew
- 1855 - 1859 : Marc-Thomas Olliffe
- 1858 - 1864 : Sede vacante (Auguste Goiran, Administrator)
- 1864 - 1865 : Augustus van Heule
- 1865 - 1867 : Sede vacante (Honoré van der Stuyft, Administrator)
- 1867 - 1877 : Walter Herman Jacobus Steins
- 1877 - 1886 : Paul François Marie Goethals

=== Archbishops of Calcutta ===
- 1886 - 1901 : Paul François Marie Goethals
- 1902 - 1924 : Brice Meuleman
- 1924 - 1960 : Ferdinand Perier
- 1960 - 1962 : Vivian Anthony Dyer
- 1962 - 1969 : Albert Vincent D'Souza
- 1969 - 1986 : Lawrence Trevor Cardinal Picachy
- 1986 - 2002 : Henry Sebastian D'Souza
- 2002 - 2012 : Lucas Sirkar
- 2012 - 2025 : Thomas D'Souza
- 2025 - Pres : Elias Frank

== Saints and causes for canonisation ==
- St. Teresa of Calcutta lived and served in Calcutta.

== See also ==
- Catholic Ecclesiastical Provinces in India
- Diocese of Calcutta of the Church of North India
- Roman Catholicism in India
