= Bombay Scottish School, Mahim =

Bombay Scottish School

Location
- Veer Savarkar Marg(Mahim); Mahim; Mumbai 400016; India; 19°2′2.5″N 72°50′21″E

Information
- Type: Private school
- Motto: Perseverentia et fide in Deo (Perseverance and faith in God)
- Religious affiliation: Christianity
- Founded: 18 February 1847; 179 years ago
- Status: open
- School board: ICSE and ISC
- Authority: Bombay Scottish Orphanage Society
- Principal: Sunita George
- Teaching staff: 120
- Age range: 3 - 17
- Average class size: 38
- Student to teacher ratio: 27:1
- Education system: Coeducational
- Classes offered: Junior Kindergarten–12th
- Language: English
- Hours in school day: approximately 8 - 8.5 hours
- Classrooms: 78
- Campus size: approximately 2 acres (8,100 m^{2})
- Campus type: Urban
- Houses: Blue, Green, Red, Yellow
- Nickname: Scottish, BSS
- National ranking: 1723829
- Publication: Tartan, the Scottish Herald
- School fees: ₹90,000 to 1,05,000
- Affiliation: Council for the Indian School Certificate Examinations
- Founder's day: 18 February
- School magazine: Tartan, The Scottish Herald
- Website: www.bombayscottish.in/mahim

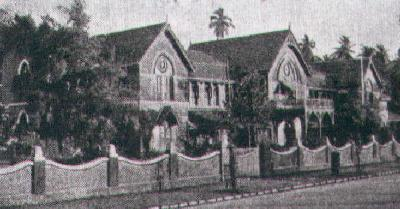
Bombay Scottish School in 1878

The Bombay Scottish School, Mahim, popularly known as Scottish, is a private, Christian co-educational day school located at Mahim West in Mumbai, India. The institution was established in 1847 by Scottish Christian missionaries under the name Scottish Female Orphanage. Bombay Scottish School, Powai is an affiliate of this institution.

The school caters to pupils from junior kindergarten up to class 12 and the medium of instruction is English. The school is affiliated with the Council for the Indian School Certificate Examinations, New Delhi, which conducts the ICSE examinations at the close of class 10 and the ISC examinations at the close of class 12. The school has been among the top 10 schools in India for the past few decades.

== History ==
The institution was founded in 1847 at Byculla in Bombay, British India by a small group of Scottish missionaries as the Scottish Female Orphanage. The orphanage was set up to educate the daughters of Scottish Presbyterian soldiers and Indian navy seamen. The success of the Scottish Female Orphanage led to the establishment of a similar institution for boys known as the Orphanage for the Sons of Presbyterians in 1857. In 1859, the Scottish Female Orphanage and the Orphanage for the Sons of Presbyterians were merged to form The Bombay Presbyterian Male and Female Orphanage. In 1863, the name of the institution was altered to the Bombay Scottish Orphanage. On 18 February 1867, the first general meeting of subscribers to the Bombay Scottish Orphanage Trust was held. The institution acquired a large plot of land adjacent to the Mahim Bay. Here a boarding school was built to impart education on the model of British schools. The school building was designed by D. E. Gostling and J. Morris and sanctioned by the Government of Bombay on 15 July 1875. The construction of the school building was commenced on 8 December 1875 by Sir Philip Edmond Wodehouse, then Governor and President in Council. The construction of the Bombay Scottish Orphanage was completed on 28 February 1878 at a cost of ₹ 84,015. The orphanage was opened by Sir Richard Temple Bart, then Governor and President in Council on 13 April 1878. The children were shifted from Byculla to their new accommodation in the boarding school at Mahim. The orphanage relied on the public to a considerable extent for monetary funds.

When the orphanage was shut down and its 11th and 12th classes discontinued, its name was changed to The Bombay Scottish School. In 1935, the number of students reached 100. The institution, which was intended to cater solely to the requirements of Scottish children, opened its doors to the children of English and European descent. Today, the school is open to children from all communities. The school has a sister concern in Powai, Mumbai which was established in 1997.

== Admissions and curriculum ==
=== Curriculum ===
The school follows the Indian Certificate of Secondary Education (ICSE) syllabus prescribed by the Council for the Indian School Certificate Examinations, New Delhi. English is the medium of instruction. Hindi and French are taught as second languages. English and Hindi are taught from class 1. Marathi, the regional language is taught as a third language and is compulsory from class 1 up to class 7.

Candidates for the ICSE examination need to finish satisfactorily courses in a third language (Marathi), Art and Craft, Physical Education, Moral Education, Socially Useful Productive Work (SUPW). These are evaluated internally by the school and the results contribute towards the award of the ICSE pass certificate. Field trips, camps and social service visits are organised regularly.

== School life ==
=== School flag and shield ===
The school flag features the white Cross of St. Andrew against a blue background. St. Andrew is the patron saint of Scotland. The flag is flown during ceremonial occasions. The school shield represents the Cross of St. Andrew. The white Crux decussata (cross) quarters the shield into four segments each representing a house colour denoted by the Fleur-de-lis, the Castle, the Lion and the Palm tree.

=== Motto, school song and school hymn ===
The school's motto is 'Perseverantia et fide in Deo', Latin for 'Perseverance and faith in God'.

=== Culture ===
Bombay Scottish imparts Christian values to its students. A Christmas concert is held every December and is a three-day event. Inter-house competitions are held in cultural activities such as drama and elocution and sports such as football, throw ball, and basketball. An annual survey conducted by the Outlook magazine in 2002 ranked the school at top position in the Mumbai region.

== Superintendents and principals ==
The institution has had fourteen heads. The Gamaliel Hall and the MacKay Hall are named after notable principals Lazarus Gamaliel and Adam MacKay. After the completion of his tenure at Mahim, Mark David went on to become the first principal of the sister school, Bombay Scottish School, Powai.
The school's principals include:

| Designation | Name | Tenure |
|---|---|---|
| Superintendent | John Anderson | 1884–1914 |
| Superintendent | D. G. Ross | 1914–1916 |
| Superintendent | H. M. Green | 1916–1921 |
| Superintendent | Thornton Ripley | 1921–1927 |
| Superintendent/Principal | Adam MacKay | 1927–1947 |
| Principal | S. A. Badvey | 1947–1957 |
| Principal | Lazarus Gamaliel | 1957–1984 |
| Principal | A. T. Balraj | 1984–1987 |
| Principal | Mark David | 1987–1997 |
| Principal | Rev. Arun Thomas | 1997–1999 |
| Principal | D. P. N. Prasad | 1999–2009 |
| Principal | Melanie Chandrashekhar | 2009–2014 |
| Principal | Molly Paul | 2014–2019 |
| Principal | Sunita George | 2019–present |

== Controversies ==
On 11 May 2008, unidentified Shiv Sena activists targeted the name plate of the school and blackened the word 'Bombay' written on one of the school gates with tar and replaced it with 'Mumbai'. The police was notified of the incident and a case was registered. Ironically, Shiv Sena chief, Uddhav Thackeray's sons Aditya and Tejas as well as Raj Thackeray's daughter Urvashi have all studied at Bombay Scottish School.

=== Sexual assault allegations against a teacher ===
A 40-year-old female teacher was arrested on charges of allegedly sexually assaulting a 16-year-old male student on multiple occasions. However, the accused “teacher” was not associated with the institution at the time of the incident, as she had been removed a year earlier. She was later acquitted on the grounds that the engagement was consensual in nature.

=== Suspected Paper Leak ===
The CISCE Geography exam held on March 11, 2015 was found to be starkly similar to the Bombay Scottish School Geography prelim paper, held on January 9th, 2015. The principal at the time, Molly Paul (who had set the ICSE paper, as confirmed by an ICSE official) came under scrutiny for the incident. CISCE launched an investigation, however it concluded that there would be no re-exam, much to the dismay of students.

== Notable alumni ==
=== Arts and entertainment ===
- Abhishek Bachchan – Hindi film actor
- Aamir Khan- Hindi film actor, producer and director.
- Aditya Bhattacharya – Hindi film director and screenwriter
- Aditya Chopra – Hindi film director, screenwriter, and producer
- Amrita Puri - Hindi film actress and daughter of Adiya Puri, the managing director of HDFC Bank
- Arjun Bijlani – Hindi television actor and Host
- Aziz Mirza – Hindi film director
- Dharmesh Darshan – Hindi film director and screenwriter
- Ekta Kapoor – Hindi film and television producer
- Hrithik Roshan – Hindi film actor
- Imran Khan – Hindi film actor
- John Abraham – Hindi film actor and former model
- Leslee Lewis – Indian film composer, best known for his work as part of Colonial Cousins
- Lucky Ali – Indian singer, songwriter, composer, and actor
- Rahul Sharma – Musician of Hindustani classical music
- Ranbir Kapoor – Hindi film actor
- Abhishek Kapoor-Indian Filmmaker.
- Ranjit Hoskote – Indian poet, art critic, cultural theorist and independent curator
- Rishi Vohra - Author
- Sushama Reddy – Indian model, VJ, and screenwriter
- Tusshar Kapoor – Hindi film actor
- Uday Chopra – Hindi film actor
- Vikas Bhalla – Indian television, film actor, and singer
- Zaheer Iqbal - Hindi film actor
- Alyy Khan - Bollywood, Hollywood and Lollywood actor.

=== Politics ===
- Aaditya Thackeray (2006) – son of Uddhav Thackeray and leader of Shiv Sena
- Praniti Shinde MLA, Maharashtra

=== Sports ===
- Rohan Gavaskar (1992) – Indian cricketer
- Jehan Daruvala- Indian Race Car Driver.

=== Other ===
- Neerja Bhanot – Senior Flight Purser with Pan Am Airways, awarded the Ashoka Chakra posthumously.
- Manvendra Singh Gohil – LGBT rights activist, belongs to the royal family of the former princely state of Rajpipla, India.
- Uma Narayan- Professor of Philosophy at Vassar College
- T. R. Andhyarujina - Former Solicitor General of India
- Pooja Dhingra- Pastry Chef; Businesswoman.
- Vicky Ratnani-Indian Chef.
- Cyrus Poncha- Indian Squash Team Coach.

== See also ==
- List of schools in Mumbai
- The Scindia School, Gwalior
- Mayo College, Ajmer
- The Doon School, Dehradun
- List of the oldest schools in the world
