= Kumar Pradhan =

Indian historian and writer

Devendra Kumar Pradhan
- Born: 7 May 1937; Kurseong, Darjeeling, British Raj
- Died: 20 December 2013 (aged 76)
- Education: Ramkrishna High School, Darjeeling; Darjeeling Government College; University of Calcutta
- Employer(s): Kurseong College, Darjeeling Government College
- Notable work: Gorkha Conquest
- Spouse: Purnima Pradhan

Kumar Pradhan (7 May 1937 – 20 December 2013) was an Indian historian and writer whose research interests include the History of the Eastern Himalayas, Genealogical studies and the Nepali literature. Pradhan has also edited and written a number of literary journals and anthologies and published learned articles in Nepali. He was the chief editor of Sunchari Samachar and other prominent Nepali newspapers.

== Early life and education ==
Pradhan was born on 7 May 1937 at Kurseong in the Darjeeling district of West Bengal. He started his schooling at Ramkrishna Vidyalaya, St Alphonsus Missionary School Darjeeling, Govt College Darjeeling and completed his master's degree in history from Calcutta University in Kolkata. He received his PhD in history from Calcutta University

== Career ==
Pradhan started his career as a teacher from St Robert's High School Darjeeling and became the lecturer in the history department of Darjeeling Government College and finally made the Principal of Kurseong College in 1984. He was the author of ‘The Gorkha Conquests: The Process and Consequences of the Unification of Nepal with Particular Reference to Eastern Nepal’. He was also the author of ‘A History of Nepali Literature’, published by the Sahitya Akademi, New Delhi, in the Sahitya Akademi Histories of Literature Series. His work, Pahilo Pahar, was awarded the Bhanubhakta Puraskar in 1983 by the Nepali Academy instituted by the Government of West Bengal. He received the Nepali Sahitya Sammelan Puraskar in 2002, and the Aam Smriti Puraskar, an award given every three years for contributions to the Nepali language and literature, instituted by Nepali Sahitya Parishad in 2003.

He was retired in 1996 and took the charge of the editor in his Nepali vernacular daily ‘Sunchari Samachar’. He also took the charge of the editor of Nepali daily Himalaya Darpan when Sunchari was closed on 26 January 2008 due to internal problem. He resigned from the daily in September 2013 to take rest due to health problems.

== Personal life ==
Pradhan was married Purnima Pradhan and they blessed with daughters Indira Pradhan and Manasha Pradhan and sons Somendra Pradhan and Gehendra Pradhan.

== Awards and recognition ==
- Bhanu Puraskar (1983) awarded by Nepali Academy, Govern-ment of West Bengal for his book Pahilo Pahar.
- Kunchanjangha Puraskar (2000) awarded by Siliguri Journal-ist Club for his contribution in the field of journalism.
- Nepali Sahitya Sammelan Puraskar (2002), awarded by Nepali Sahitya Sammelan, Darjeeling for his contribution in the field of Nepali language and literature.
- Agam Smriti Puraskar (2003), awarded by Nepali Sahitya Parishad, Sikkim for his contribution in the field of Nepali language and literature.
- Kunchanjangha Kalam Puraskar (2006), awarded by Press Club of Sikkim for his contribution in the field of journal-ism.

== Contributions of Kumar Pradhan ==
- Thesis (Ph.D.) Pradhan, Kumar. 1982. The Process and Consequences of the Unification of Nepal, with Particular Reference to Eastern Nepal AD 1750–1850. Department of History, Calcutta University.

Books and Edited Volumes

- ed. 1971. Baarta Haru. (An anthology of critical essays in Nepali). Darjeeling: Nepali Sahitya Parishad.
- 1982. Pahilo Pahar (in Nepali). Darjeeling: ShyamPrakashan (2010 Second Edition, SajhaPrakashan, Lalitpur, Nepal).
- 1984. A History of Nepali Literature. New Delhi: Sahitya Academy.
- 1991. Gorkha Conquest: The Process and Consequences of the Unification of Nepal, with Particular Reference to Eastern Nepal . Calcutta: Oxford University Press (Reprinted in 2009 with a foreword by John Whelpton, Himal Books, Lalitpur, Nepal) ISBN 978 9937 8144 7 8.
- ed. 2005. Adhiti Kahi. (Anthology of literary critique in Ne-pali), Siliguri: PurnimaPrakashan.

Articles

- 1967. The Myth of Chinese Suzerainty. The Voice of Tibet 1 (3): 3–5.
- 1970. Dewkota Ma Romantikata (in Nepali). Diyalo XI (36): 9–18.
- 1973. Anayase Soche Chu (in Nepali). Pines and Camellias, Darjeeling Government College Journal, Annual Issue: 30–32.
- 1982. Agam Singh Giri Ko Kabitama Jatiya Bhavna (in Nepali). Manav Traimasik, Inaugural Volume, October – December: 71–87.
- 1983. A Note on the Lepchas. Journal of Bengal Natural History Society, N.S. 2 (2): 66–67.
- 1983. Purano Maang – Chutte Pranta Ko Maang (in Nepali). Andolon 1 (1): 1–4.
- 1993. Nepali Bhasako Sankshipto Parichaya (in Nepali). In Prakriya, edited by BirbhadraKarikodi, 76–83. Prakriya Prakashan: Paschim Sikkim.
- 2004. Darjeeling Ma Nepali Jati Ra Janjatiya Chinarika Naya Udaan Haru (in Nepali). Mahesh Chandra Regmi Lecture Social Science. Baha, Lalitpur, Nepal.

School Level History Textbooks

- 1974. Bharatbarsha Ko Aitihasik Parichaya. (IXth standard history textbook in Nepali). Darjeeling: Singhal Prakashan.
- 1977. Itihas Parichay: Bharatbarsha Ko. (VIIth standard history textbook in Nepali). Darjeeling: Shyam Prakashan.
- 2008 [1980]. Prachin Savyata Haru. (VIth standard History textbook in Nepali). Darjeeling: ShyamPrakashan.
- 2007 [1982]. Manav Savyata: Madhya Yug (VIIth standard textbook in Nepali). Darjeeling: Shyam Prakashan.
- 1983. Bharatiya Itihas Ko Ruprekha. (Xth standard textbook in Nepali). Darjeeling: Shyam Prakashan.
- 1997 [1983]. Manav Savyata: Adhunik Yug. (VIIIth standard History textbook in Nepali). Darjeeling: Shyam Prakashan.
- 1986. Bharatiya Itihas Ko Ruprekha. (Xth standard textbook in Nepali). Darjeeling: Shyam Prakashan.
- 2000 [1989]. Bharatiya Itihas. (IXth &Xth standard history textbook in Nepali). Darjeeling: Shyam Prakashan.
- 1991. History of the Middle Ages. (VIIth standard history textbook in English). Darjeeling: Bista Publication House.
- 1992. History of Modern Times. (VIIIth standard history textbook in English). Darjeeling: Bista Publishing House.

Works in Translation

- n.d. Translated into Nepali the Statute of the International Court of Justice. Darjeeling: Vinayak Publications.
- 1991. Translated into Nepali M. K. Naik's A History of Indian English Literature. New Delhi: Sahitya Academy.
- 2000. Translated Birendra Subba's poems into English (“The Birth of My Son” and “The Fair”). Published in Signatures: One Hundred Indian Poets, edited by K. Sachidanandan. New Delhi: National Book Trust.
- 2009. Translated Remika Thapa's poems into English. Published in Voices from the Margin, Man Prasad Subba and Remika Thapa. Siliguri: Sunchari Prakashan.

Edited Journals and Newspapers

- Kamal (1953). Nepali Literary Journal published from Darjeeling.
- Hamro Sansaar (1961–1962). Nepali Monthly Journal published from Calcutta.
- Maalingo (1964–1966). Nepali Literary Journal published by
- Nepali Sahitya Sammelan, Darjeeling.
- Hamro Patrika (2009–2010). Nepali Monthly Journal published from Siliguri.
- Sunchari Samachar (1993–2007). Nepali News daily published from Siliguri.
- Himalaya Darpan (2008–2013). Nepali News daily published from Siliguri.
