= Scottish Indian =

Ethnic group; part Indian and part Scottish or of Scottish descent in India

Scottish-Indians
- (Scotland) (India)

Regions with significant populations
- Kolkata; Mumbai; New Delhi; Hyderabad

Languages
- English (Scottish · Indian) · Scots · Gaelic; Hindi · Other Indian languages

Religion
- Church of Scotland

Related ethnic groups
- Anglo-Indian; Irish Indians; Indian diaspora

Scottish-Indians refers to either Scots diaspora living in India, or the descendants with Scottish or people of Scottish and Indian ancestry. Scottish-Indian, like Irish Indians, are often categorized as an Anglo-Indian. Scottish Indians celebrate Scottish culture, with traditional Scottish celebrations like Burns Night widely observed among the community.

== History ==
=== 18th Century ===
Scottish immigration to India began with the union of Scotland with England in 1707 to create the United Kingdom. Under the deal, Scotland's landed families gained access to the East India Company, and gradually become its dominant force. Scots came into India as writers, traders, engineers, missionaries, tea and indigo planters, jute traders and teachers. By 1771 almost half of the East India Company's writers were Scots.

The Scottish presence was also strongly evident in India. The first three Governor-Generals of India were Scots. When Henry Dundas became President of the Board of Control in 1784 he 'Scoticised' India and through his agencies Scots came to dominate the activities of the East India Company (EIC). By 1792, Scots made up one in nine EIC civil servants, six in eleven common soldiers and one in three officers.

=== 19th Century ===
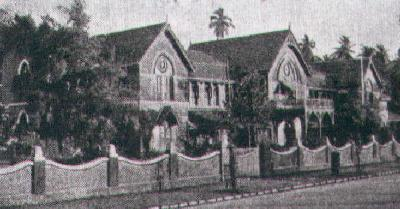
The Bombay Scottish School in the early 1900s

By 1813, 19 of Calcutta's private merchant houses were dominated by Scots. From 1830 onwards, Scots became involved as general merchants with Indian interests. They began to export jute, tea, timber, coal, sugar and indigo as well as cotton. By 1880, with the help of Scottish entrepreneurs, India overtook China as leaders of tea distribution.

The 18th and 19th centuries saw Scots found some of the first modern colleges in India, which acted as a 'cultural conduit' through which Enlightenment values came to permeate Indian society.

=== 20th Century ===
The Calcutta Scottish was a regiment of volunteers of Scottish descent raised in 1914 as an infantry regiment of the British Indian Army. The regiment formed part of the army reserves in Auxiliary Force, India (AFI). The regiment was disbanded following India's independence in 1947.

== Education ==
List of Scottish schools in India:

- Bombay Scottish School, Mahim (Established in 1847)
- Bombay Scottish School, Powai (Established in 1997)
- Scottish Church College (Established in 1830)
- Scottish Church Collegiate School (Established in 1830)

== Scottish Cemetery at Calcutta ==
The Scottish Cemetery at Calcutta was established in 1820 catering to the specific needs of the large Scottish population in the Kolkata area. The cemetery was utilised until the 1940s but was abandoned in the 1950s and neglected following India's independence. Well over 90% of those buried bear recognizably Scots names such as Reid, McGregor, Campbell and Ross. Around 10% are Bengali.

The cemetery was recently restored by the Kolkata Scottish Heritage Trust (KSHT) in 2008.

== Notable individuals ==
- James Skinner (East India Company officer)
- William Dalrymple – India-based historian
- Alexander Duff – Christian Protestant Presbyterian missionary
- Neil Benjamin Edmonstone – Indian civilian
- Daniel Eliott – Scottish Indian civilian
- Edward Hay Mackenzie Elliot – British soldier
- Walter Elliot – Scottish naturalist
- Colin Mackenzie – Indian Army officer
- Norman Marjoribanks – Indian magistrate and civil servant
- James Wood-Mason – Scottish zoologist
- Fearless Nadia – Indian film actress and stuntwoman
- Malcolm Struan Tonnochy – Former acting Governor of Hong Kong
- George Yule – Former President of the Indian National Congress
- Alexander Cunningham – Founder of Archaeological Survey of India
- Aeneas Francon Williams and his wife Clara Anne Rendall – Both were Church of Scotland Missionaries in Kalimpong, West Bengal and Dooars, and of Scottish descent
- Sam Selvon, Trinidadian British writer

== See also ==
- Britons in India
- Indian diaspora
- Paisley (design)
