= Dougla people =

Caribbean people of mixed African and Indian descent

Regions with significant populations
- Caribbean (notably in Trinidad and Tobago, Guyana, Suriname), Jamaica, Grenada, Guadeloupe, Martinique, Saint Lucia, Saint Vincent and the Grenadines, Belize, Barbados, and Sint Maarten; Diaspora in the United States, the United Kingdom, Canada, and the Netherlands

Languages
- Caribbean English (predominantly Trinidadian Creole, Guyanese Creole, Sranan Tongo, Jamaican Patois, Saint Lucian Creole), French, Dutch, Papiamento, Caribbean Hindustani

Religion
- Christianity; Hinduism; Islam; Afro-American religions; Irreligion

Related ethnic groups
- Afro-Caribbeans, Indo-Caribbeans

Dougla (English: /ˈdoʊɡlə/ – from Caribbean Hindustani dugalaa 'mixed') is a term used to describe people who are of mixed Afro-Caribbean (black) and Indo-Caribbean (brown) descent.

== Definition ==
The word Dougla originated from dogala (दोगला), which is a Caribbean Hindustani word that literally means "two-necks" and may mean "many", "much" or "a mix" (literally bastard, of two fathers). Its etymological roots are cognate with the Hindi "do" meaning "two" and "gala", which means "throat". Within the West Indies context, the word is used only for one type of mixed race people: Afro-Indians.

The 2012 Guyana census identified 29.25% of the population as Afro-Guyanese, 39.83% as Indo-Guyanese, and 19.88% as "mixed," recognized as mostly representing the offspring of the former two groups.

In the French West Indies (Guadeloupe, Martinique), Afro-Indian people used to be referred to as Batazendyen or Chapé-Kouli.

== History ==
There are sporadic records of Indo-Euro interracial relationships, both consensual and nonconsensual, before any ethnic mixing of the African and Indian variety.

Other Indo-based types of mixed heritage, including Indo-Chinese (Chindians), Indo-Latino/Hispanic (Tegli), Indo-English (Anglo-Indians), Indo-Portuguese (Luso-Indians), Indo-Irish (Irish Indians), Indo-Scottish (Scottish-Indians), Indo-Dutch, Indo-Arabs and Indo-Amerindian, tended to identify as one of the older, unmixed ethnic strains on the island: Afro, Indo, Amerindian or Euro or passing as one of them.

== See also ==
- Indo-African (disambiguation)
- Indo-Trinidadian and Tobagonian
- Afro-Trinidadian and Tobagonian
- Indo-Caribbean
- Afro-Caribbean
- Marabou (ethnicity)
