= Victoria Boys' School (Kurseong) =

Victoria Boys' School, Kurseong

Location
- Kurseong, West Bengal; India; 26.8835669°N 88.2871083°E

Information
- Type: Independent all-boys day and boarding secondary school
- Motto: Latin: QUO LUX DUCIT transl. 'Which Leads To Light'
- Established: 1879; 147 years ago
- Founder: Sir Ashley Eden
- Grades: Class IV-X
- Campus: PO Dowhill, Kurseong, Darjeeling, West Bengal, 734220, India
- Colour: Grey
- Sports: Cricket, Football, Volleyball, Badminton, Table tennis, Athletics
- Affiliations: ICSE

Victoria Boys' School is a Heritage Government run English medium boys boarding school offering I.C.S.E. (Delhi Council) in the hill town of Kurseong, Darjeeling, India founded in 1879.

It is among the oldest schools in India.

== History ==
Sir Ashley Eden, an official and diplomat in British India and the then Lieutenant Governor of Bengal started the school in 1879 for railway employees and later extended to the children of middle and lower income group government servants and was paid out of local funds. To serve the purpose a house named ‘Constantia’ was bought and was converted into a residential school. Children of non-officials were also accepted but they had to pay a higher fee.

=== First batch of students ===
In August 1879 the first batch of 16 children arrived, traveling in three tongas from Siliguri, they had to halt at six places before arriving at the school. Within a few years, the number of pupils increased and the space in the old building could not accommodate the numbers anymore. Subsequently, the Railway Offices and Quarters in Dow Hill were vacated and handed over to the Education Department and the school moved to its present location.

=== First Headmaster and teachers ===
Mr Edward Pegler was the first Headmaster of the school and was assisted by his wife Mrs Elizabeth Pegler who was later appointed the Headmistress of Dow Hill Girls' School. The Peglers worked on their own till 1885 by which time the School had 103 students. In 1886 two more teachers from England, Mr and Mrs Barnes, arrived to help Mr and Mrs Pegler. The demand for the admission of boys pupils grew the Government decided to reserve the School for boys only in 1888.

== Dow Hill and Victoria Schools ==
=== Dow Hill Girls' School inception ===
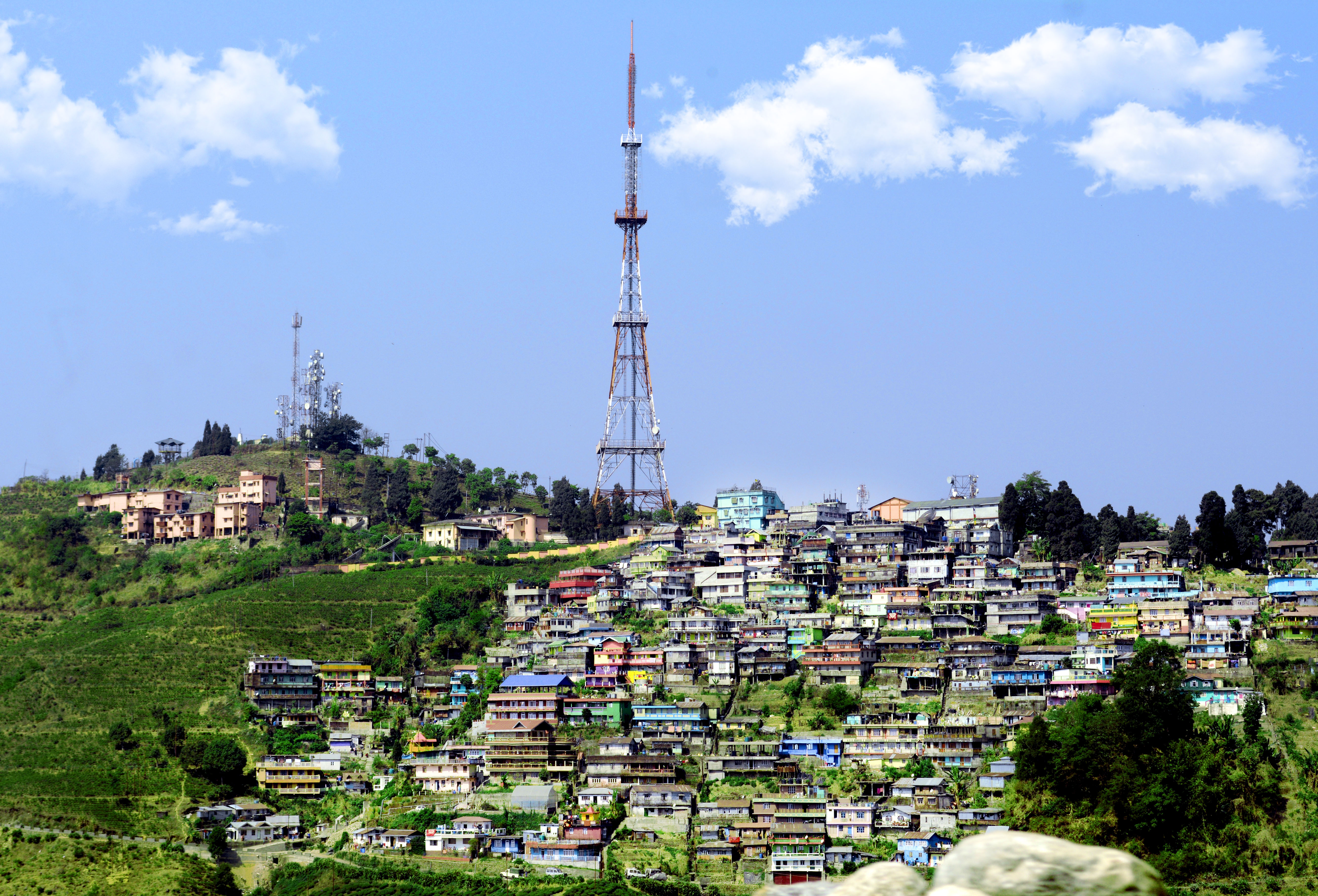
Town of Kurseong

After Dow Hill School ceased to be co-educational the girls' section remained closed for six years. After a decade the boys' school was shifted to its current building one kilometer away and was renamed 'Victoria Boys' School' to commemorate the Jubilee year of Queen Victoria, Empress of India. Sir Charles Elliot, who had provided funds for the new building authorised the reopening of the girls’ school in the former school building and in 1898 a girls’ only school, 'Dow Hill Girls' School' was established.

Now the two schools are situated one kilometre apart amongst beautiful pine forests.

=== Victoria Boys' School early 1900s ===
At the end of the year 1905–06 Victoria Boys' School had 190 pupils all of whom were boarders. It had a staff of 12 teachers and a Gymnastic Instructor. Six of the teachers had English or Irish qualifications and two were undergraduates from the Calcutta University. The staff included a steward, two matrons, a trained nurse and a house-keeper.

The school had a technical department affiliated to the Sibpur Civil Engineering College in which a course of two years was provided for boys who passed middle school examination.

== See also ==
- Education in India
- List of schools in India
- Education in West Bengal
