= Bombay Scottish School, Powai =

Location
- Raheja Vihar, Off Chandivali Farm Road, Powai; Mumbai, Maharashtra, 400072; India; 19°7′5.5″N 72°53′36″E

Information
- Type: Private School
- Motto: Perseverentia et fide in Deo (Perseverance and faith in God)
- Religious affiliation: Christianity
- Founded: 21 June 1997; 29 years ago
- School board: ICSE
- Principal: Jane Kotian
- Grades: Kindergarten – 10th
- Gender: Co-educational
- Classes: 36
- Average class size: 42 - 45
- Classes offered: Jr KG to 10th
- Hours in school day: 8 – 8.5
- Campus type: Urban
- Houses: Blue, Green, Red, Yellow
- Song: Sing Bombay Scottish School
- Yearbook: Tartan
- School fees: 118,000 per annum
- Affiliation: Indian Certificate of Secondary Education

The Bombay Scottish School, Powai (BSS or BSS Powai), also popularly known as Scottish, is a private, Christian co-educational day school located in Powai in Mumbai, India. It is an affiliate of Bombay Scottish School, Mahim. The institution was established on 21 June 1997 by Mark David.

The school caters to pupils from kindergarten up to class 10 and the medium of instruction is English. The school is affiliated with the Council for the Indian School Certificate Examinations, New Delhi, which conducts the ICSE examinations at the close of class 10.

== School shield and crest ==
The school shield represents the Cross of St. Andrew, the patron saint of Scotland. The white crux decussata (cross) quarters the shield into four segments, each representing a house colour denoted by the Fleur-de-lis (blue house), the Castle (red house), the Lion (green house) and the Palm Tree (yellow house).

== School flag and motto ==
The school flag features the white cross of St. Andrew against a blue band. St. Andrew is the patron saint of Scotland. It bears the 'Crux decussata'. The flag is flown during ceremonial occasions like the school's Sports Day. The school's motto is "Perseverantia et Fide in Deo (Latin)" which means perseverance and faith in God.

== Curriculum ==
The Bombay Scottish School follows the syllabus of the Indian Certificate of Secondary Education (ICSE) since 20 September 2000. English is the medium of instruction. Hindi is taught as a second language and Marathi is taught as a third language. Tests are conducted periodically and examinations are held at the end of every school term.

== Culture ==
Bombay Scottish is a cosmopolitan school. Although the majority of the pupils are Hindu by religion, the school attempts to impart Christian values. The Christmas Concert is celebrated every December and a sports meet and a farewell party for students who are passing out of the institution are held.

== Management ==
The school is managed by the Committee of Management, the Board of Trustees for the Bombay Scottish Orphanage Society. The principal of the school is Jane Kotian, who manages the general administration.

== House system ==
The main objective of the House System is to foster a sense of collective responsibility and solidarity amongst students. The House System also serves as the centre of school life, with houses often competing at sports and other co-curricular activities. There are four school houses – Blue, Green, Red, Yellow. The boys' house names are named after Scottish missionaries and the girls' are named after British queens.

Boys	Girls
MacGregor	Elizabeth
Kennedy	Victoria
MacPherson	Catherine
Haddow	Anne

== Notable alumni ==
=== Arts and entertainment ===
- Aditya Bhattacharya – Indian film director and screenwriter
- Aditya Chopra (1987) – Indian film director, screenwriter and producer
- Amrita Puri - Indian Bollywood Actor, the managing director of HDFC Bank
- Aziz Mirza – Bollywood director
- Dharmesh Darshan – Bollywood film director and screenwriter
- Rahul Sharma – Musician of Hindustani classical music
- Ranjit Hoskote (1984) – Indian poet, art critic, cultural theorist and independent curator
- Rishi Vohra (1990) - Author
- Tusshar Kapoor – Bollywood actor
- Uday Chopra (1989) – Bollywood actor
- Vikas Bhalla – Indian television and movie actor and singer

=== Sports ===
- Rohan Gavaskar (1992) – Indian cricketer

== See also ==
- List of schools in Mumbai
- List of the oldest schools in the world
