= Chanmari Ground =

Sports ground in Kurseong, India

Coordinates: 22.°14′20″N 87°52′18″E

- Location: Chanmari, Fatak Dara, Kurseong, West Bengal, India
- Capacity: 8,000

Chanmari Ground is a multi-purpose sports ground located in Kurseong, West Bengal, India. The ground was built in the early 1960s. The main tenant is the Indian Army. Kurseong Gorkha Hill Sports and local football association organise events at the ground.
