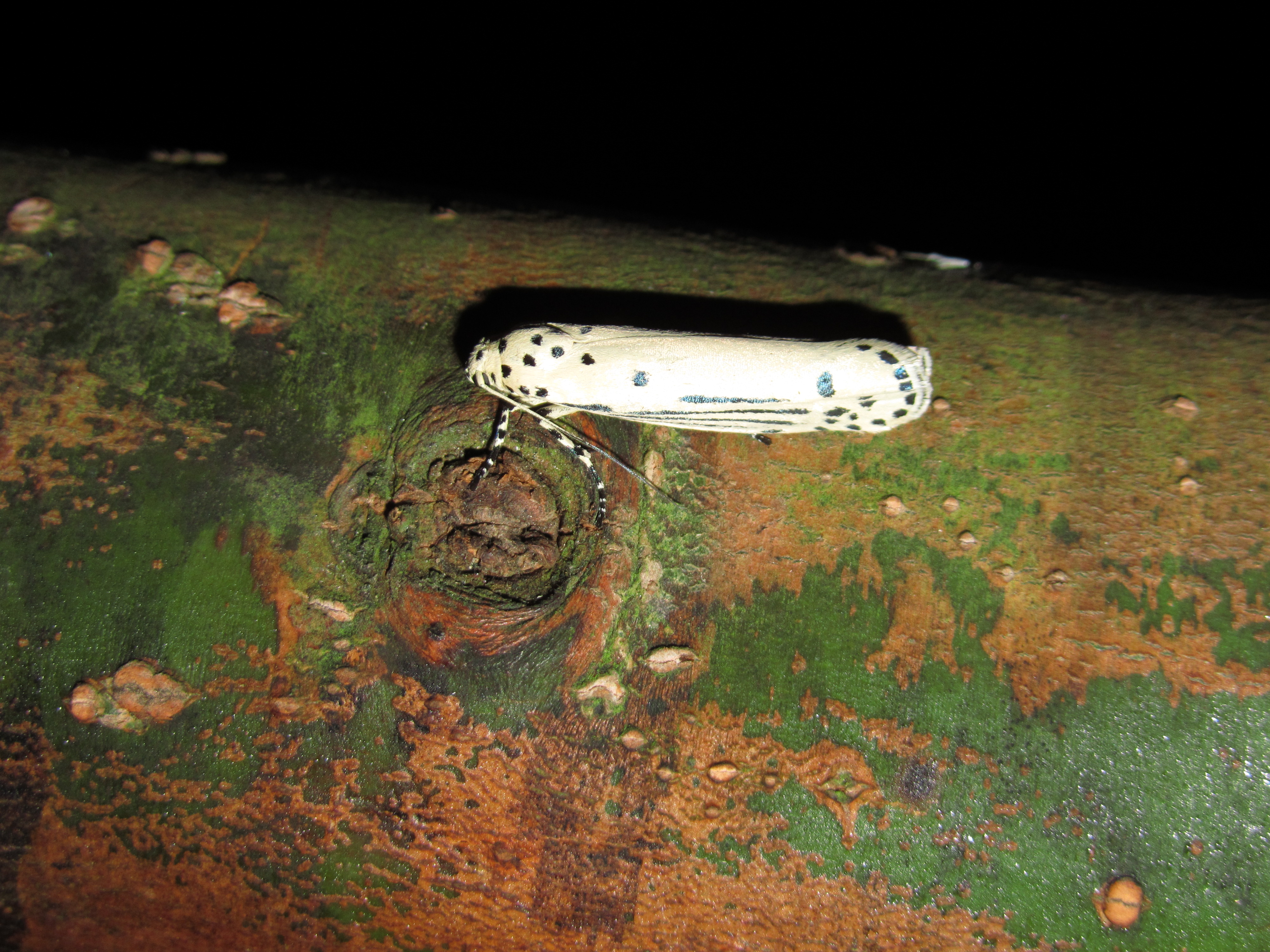

Scientific classification
- Domain: Eukaryota
- Kingdom: Animalia
- Phylum: Arthropoda
- Class: Insecta
- Order: Lepidoptera
- Family: Depressariidae
- Genus: Ethmia
- Species: E. lineatonotella

Binomial name
- Ethmia lineatonotella (Moore, 1867)

Synonyms
- Hyponomeuta lineatonotella Moore, 1867

= Ethmia lineatonotella =

Species of moth

Ethmia lineatonotella is a moth in the family Depressariidae. It is found in India (Darjeeling, Assam, Kurseong), Myanmar, Vietnam, China and Taiwan.

The wingspan is 40–50 mm (1.6–2.0 in). Adults are on wing nearly year-round.

The larvae feed on Ehretia longiflora.
