= India–Ireland relations =

- Ireland: India

Diplomatic mission
- Embassy of Ireland, New Delhi: Embassy of India, Dublin

Envoy
- Irish Ambassador to India Kevin Kelly: Indian Ambassador to Ireland Sandeep Kumar

The Republic of India and Republic of Ireland maintain bilateral relations. As former possessions of the British Empire, the two countries had a similar fight against a common adversary and there were many ties between the respective independence movements in the two countries. Many of the provisions of the Constitution of India were drawn from their Irish counterpart, the Constitution of Ireland. There are also regular governmental visits. Indo–Irish relations were also strengthened by people like of Jawaharlal Nehru, Éamon de Valera, Rabindranath Tagore, W B Yeats, James Joyce, Sister Nivedita, and Annie Besant.

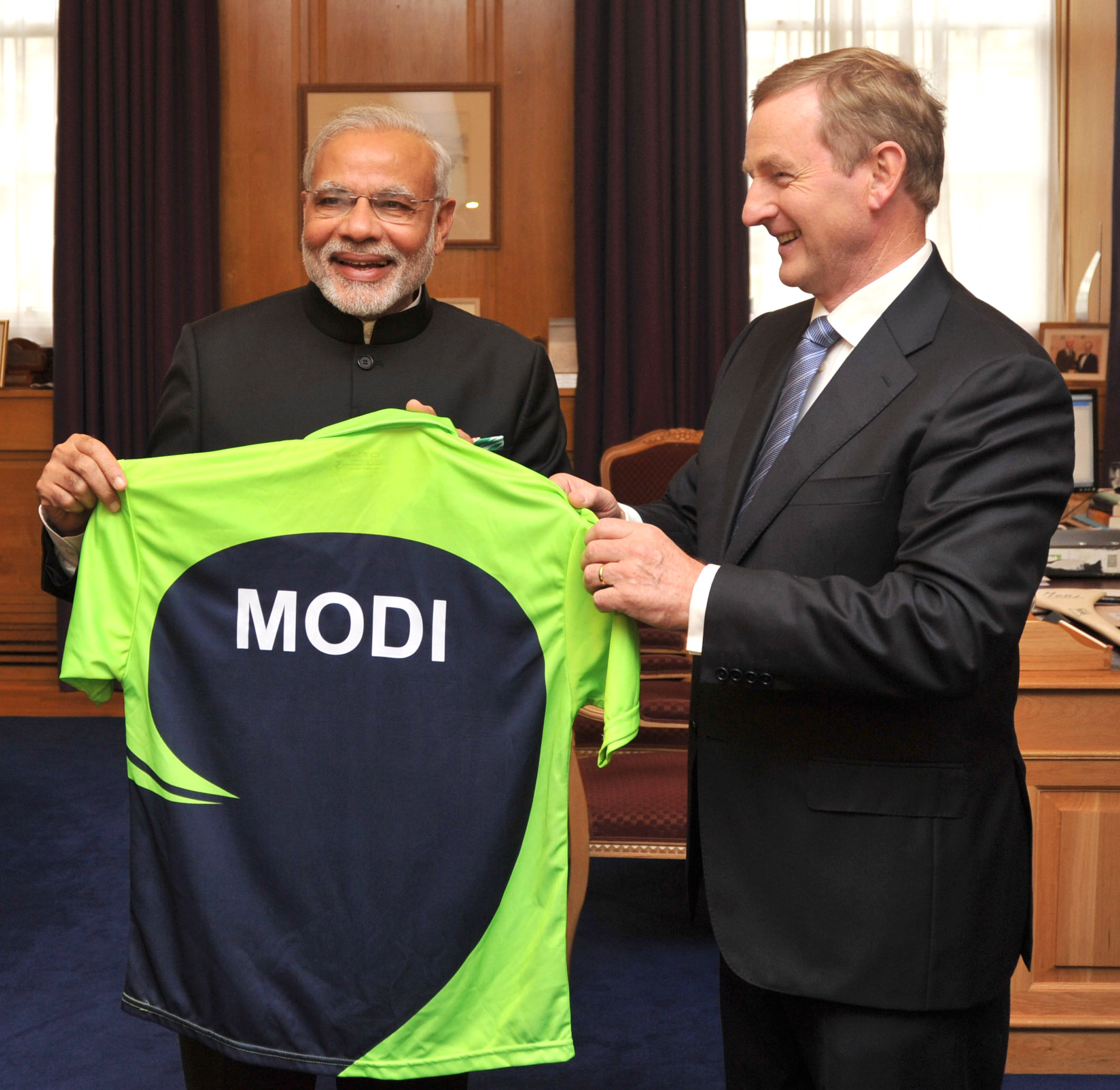
Prime Ministers Narendra Modi and Enda Kenny at Government Buildings, Dublin.

== Emerging relations ==
'India and Ireland', a speech given by Éamon de Valera in February 1920

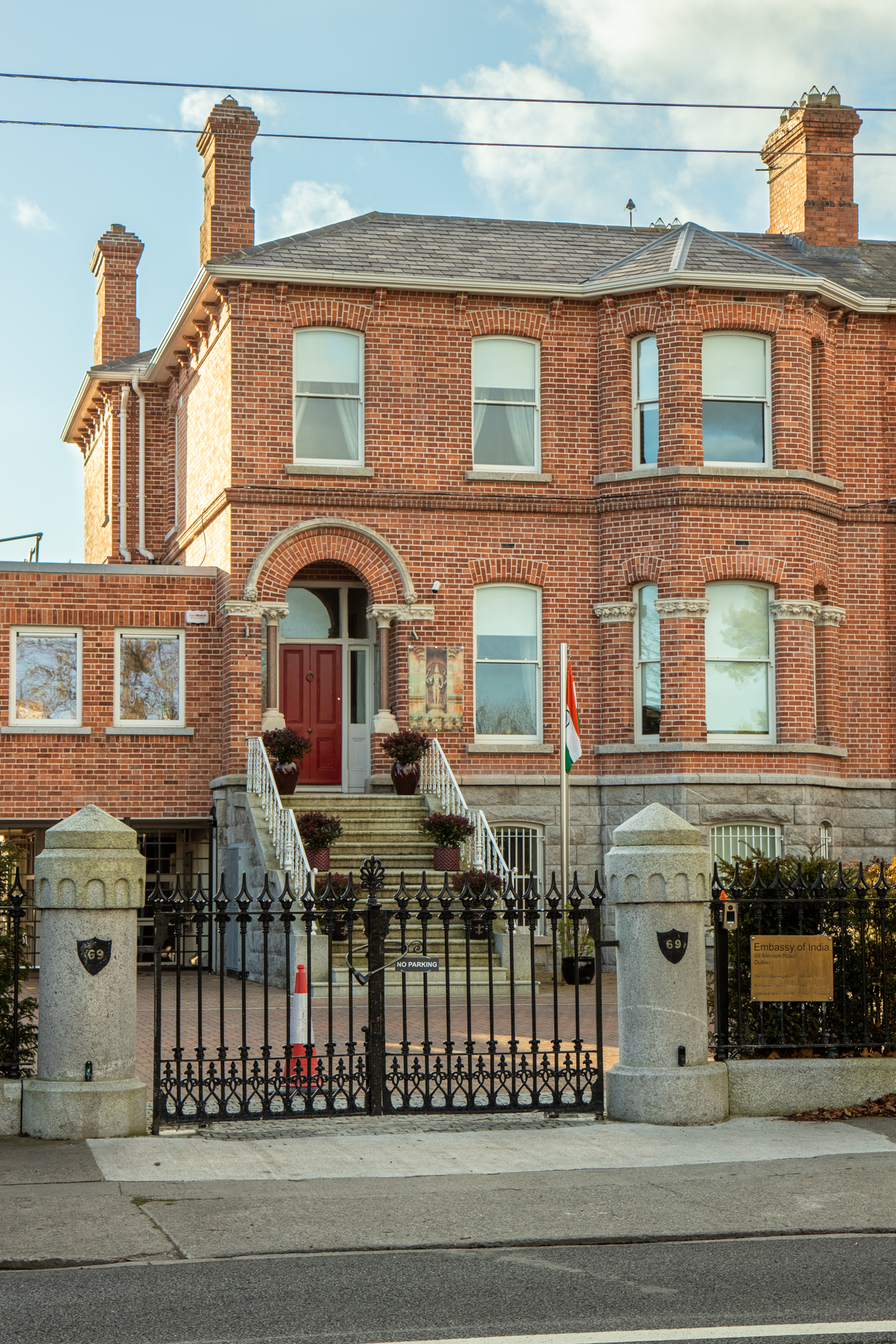
Embassy of India in Dublin

During the struggles for freedom from colonial rule, Indian and Irish "nationalist movements were linked by a history of rebellion against British rule." Studies have often compared to the two independence struggles. Independence leaders such as Jawaharlal Nehru and Éamon de Valera were said to be in touch with each other. Likewise Vithalbhai Patel and Subhas Chandra Bose were also said to be in touch with Irish nationalist leaders. The strongest tie between the two was the link of Annie Besant, from an Irish family but firm supporter of Indian self rule. In 1916 she launched the Home Rule League to model Indian independence on the Irish struggle. Both countries held economic, political, and strategically important ties to the British empire. In both cases, the independent struggles led to other movements within the British empire for independence. A sixteenth century proverb said "he who would win England, must with Ireland begin;" this was matched by Lord Curzon's "As long as we rule India we are the greatest power in the world. If we lose it we shall drop straight away to a third rate power." Lord Salisbury continued, perhaps prophetically, that "Ireland must be kept like India by persuasion if not by force." The aim to progress Irish Catholics and Indian Muslims and Hindus served to promote the cultural nationalisms and autonomous demands of both nations.

A significant number of Irish people joined the Indian Civil Service and the British Indian Army during the 19th and 20th centuries. Prominent Irish civil servants in India include Sir Michael O'Dwyer who was Lieutenant Governor of Punjab when the Jallianwala Bagh massacre in Amritsar occurred. Additionally, numerous Irish missionaries, teachers, doctors and engineers were active in India during this period.

== Formal relations ==
Mutual recognition occurred in 1947, upon Indian independence, while diplomatic exchange opened later. India, having already enjoyed an informally-credentialed envoy in Krishna Menon from 1947, formally appointed him ambassador in 1949; Menon, who had the Indian High Commission in London as a primary office, established an embassy in Ireland in 1951, while Ireland did the same in 1964. William Warnock became Ireland's first ambassador to India that year. To mark the occasion, that same year at Irish president Éamon de Valera's insistence, the Indian president Dr. Sarvepalli Radhakrishnan visited Ireland. Ireland maintains Honorary Consulates in Mumbai, Kolkata, Chennai and Bengaluru.

== Extravenous ties ==
The bombing of Air India's Kanishka on 23 June 1985 led to a further bond of ties beyond the political arena. In this the families of Indians and NRIs were tied with Ahakista and County Cork. An elegant memorial in the village stands as a testimony to these ties; while the opening of an Éamon de Valera Marg in the Indian capital also fostered these ties.

== Irish philanthropy ==
Some €5m was said to be being spent in India each year. A substantial proportion of the funding was said to be channelled through some of the large Irish NGOs, including Trócaire, Goal and Concern, and agencies that augment the Irish Aid funds from their own resources to implement large-scale programmes where they focus, such as Odisha and West Bengal. Further portions of the funds were granted to a second category of Irish and international NGOs to fund stand-alone projects and programmes through the Civil Society Fund. An increasing level of resources was also earmarked by the Irish Government for supporting the work of indigenous civil society within the country. The Irish embassy was also said to be pursuing a range of initiatives and strategies to ensure that resources produced maximum outcomes in terms of efforts to reduce poverty in some of the poorest parts of India. Amongst the highlighted social issued in India, one NGO, using Irish Aid funds, developed wells at girls’ schools; this supported the twin aims of providing clean water and promoting education for the girl-child.

== Economic relations ==
Total trade between the two countries went from €363.5 million in 2005 to €447.3 million in 2007. Indian exports (having been higher in at least the accounted period) counted for €279.8 million to Indian imports of €167.5 million in 2007.

Indian exports included garments and clothing, textile yarn, and medical and pharmaceutical products. Indian imports included telecommunications and sound equipment, automatic data processing machines, and other manufactured articles.

Indian companies Ranbaxy Laboratories, Wockhardt Group and Reliance Life Sciences in the pharmaceutical industry; with TCS and other IT companies in the relevant field. Irish companies in India were much broader with IT services, banking video gaming, oil exploration, media outlets, the Met Pro Group, property companies, cement companies, food processing, and software products industries represented.

Furthermore, a Science and Technology Cooperation Agreement was signed in 2006 with Ahern's visit to India. Furthermore, an estimated 1,000 Indian students were said to be studying in Ireland, while 20,000 – 25,000 Indian and PIO's were said to reside in Ireland (16,000 – 18,000 of whom were Indian citizens).

And Ireland India Council also seeks to foster business ties between the two states. The Council sought to increase "People to People Contact," "Cultural Exchange" engendered through cultural awareness as a necessary attribute to nurturing bilateral relations and / or economic interactions, as "Exchange of Ideas," and more importantly "Business-to-Business Interaction." The council said it existed to provide services for:

- Networking in desirable business sectors both in India and in Ireland
- Assist its members in setting and operating their business in India and vice versa
- Provide travel assistance to its members
- Organise workshop and conferences to its members
- Provide cultural familiarisation and training to the companies staff and executives

The Ireland India Business Association (IIBA) was founded in May 2008 to enhance and increase commercial links between Irish and Indian businesses.

== Cultural relations ==
During a visit to India in November 2012 with delegation from 16 universities, Minister for Education and Skills Ciarán Cannon said that the two countries have "old ties" and there were many Irish missionaries who run schools in India. He also announced: "We want very strong education ties with India. We not only want Indian students to come to Ireland but we also want Irish students to come to India. Ireland to grow, needs trade. If our students have international exposure, it will be easier for us to grow." In this vein, he unveiled several scholarships for Indian students to study in Ireland. IUA's International Education Manager Sinead Lucey said: "Choosing Ireland is a very smart choice for students in areas such as IT, pharmaceuticals and food where there are not enough graduates to fill the jobs. In fact, Ireland has been looking to India to fill some of these jobs. Also, the number of multinational companies in Ireland is something you won’t get in other countries and they continue to create job opportunities for skilled graduates." It followed the enticing prospect of extended visas to work in Ireland with chances to apply for residency and citizenship.

== Bilateral visits ==
From India

- Prime Minister Jawaharlal Nehru: 1949 & 1956
- President Sarvapalli Radhakrishnan: 1964
- President Neelam Sanjiva Reddy: 1982
- Prime Minister Narendra Modi: 2015
- External Affairs Minister Dr. S. Jaishankar: 2025

From Ireland

- Éamon de Valera: 1948
- President Patrick Hillery: 1978
- President Mary Robinson: 1993
- Taoiseach Garret FitzGerald: 1984
- Taoiseach Bertie Ahern: 2006

== See also ==
- South Asian people in Ireland
- Irish Indians
