= Dev Kumari Thapa =

Indian Nepali writer

- देवकुमारी थापा
- Born: 14 April 1928; Kurseong, Bengal, British India (present-day West Bengal, India)
- Died: 5 May 2011 (aged 83); Biratnagar, Nepal
- Occupation: Writer
- Notable work: Sunpakheti Chari
- Spouse: Babarsingha Thapa
- Awards: Gorakha Dakshin Bahu; Mahendra Pragya Prize; Ratnashree Gold Medal

Dev Kumari Thapa (14 April 1928 – 5 May 2011) was an Indian Nepali-language writer, who mainly wrote stories.

== Biography ==
=== Early life ===
She was born on 14 April 1928 (2 Baisakh 1985 BS) in Kurseong, Darjeeling, India to father Hasta Bahadur Katuwal and mother Ramadevi Katuwal. She was orphaned at a young age. Her father died before she was born. When she was about ten, her mother died and was raised by her grandmother.

=== Education ===
She completed high school in Darjeeling and then went on to earn a diploma from a 3-year nursing course.

== Notable works ==
Books
Year of Publication	Title	Genre
1970 (2027 BS)	Tapari	Short story collection
1979 (2036 BS)	Katha ko Batulo	Short story collection
1984 (2041 BS)	Bhok Tripti	Short story collection
1985 (2042 BS)	Sunpakheti Chari	Children story collection
1987 (2044 BS)	Pralaya Pratiksha	Short story collection
