= Jagdish Mandir Kurseong =

Hindu temple in West Bengal, India

Jagdish Mandir
- जगदिश मन्दिर

Religion
- Affiliation: Hinduism
- District: Darjeeling district
- Deity: Lord Krishna
- Festival: Janmashtami

Location
- Location: Kurseong
- State: West Bengal
- Country: India

Architecture
- Type: Temple
- Creator: Purohit (Pareek) brothers
- Established: 300 years ago

Jagdish Mandir Kurseong is a temple dedicated to Lord Jagganth (Lord Krishna) and is situated in Kurseong town in Darjeeling District of West Bengal, India.

The temple was built around 300 years ago by Purohit (Pareek) brothers who came to Kurseong from Mokalpur (Mokala) a small town of Rajasthan. As the Brahmin family of Pareeks were devotees of Lord Krishna the male members of the family made statues of Lord Jagannath from the holy neem tree of the village and set out in different directions to make temples of Lord Jagganath. As per available records many temples of Lord Jagannath were established in different parts of India. The address of Jagdish Mandir Kurseong is J M Goenka Road, also called Bank Road, walking distance from Main Bus and Railway Station.

The main towns presently known are:

1. Kurseong, Darjeeling, West Bengal.

2. Bhavnagar, Gujarat.

3. Gulej Garh.

4. Daman Diu.

5. Bundi, Rajasthan.

6. Kota, Rajasthan.

7. Khangaria Bangharia, Madhya Pradesh

8. Bajna, Dholpur, Rajasthan.

9. Ahmedabad, Gujrat.

It is also known that there was a temple in Karachi (now Pakistan) before independence. (Present status not known)
