= List of ambassadors of India to Ireland =

Head of mission of India to Ireland

Ambassador of India to Ireland
- Emblem of India

- Flag of India
- Incumbent; Manish Gupta since April 2026
- Style: His Excellency
- Type: Ambassador
- Member of: Indian Foreign Service
- Reports to: Ministry of External Affairs
- Seat: Embassy of India, Dublin
- Appointer: President of India
- Term length: No fixed tenure
- Website: Indian Ambassador to Ireland

The ambassador of India to Ireland is the chief diplomatic representative of India to Ireland, housed in the Indian Embassy located at 69 Merrion Road, Ballsbridge, Dublin 4, Ireland.

The embassy is headed by the Ambassador.

== List of Indian Ambassadors ==
The following people have served as Ambassadors to Ireland.

S. No.	Name	Entered office	Left office	Note
1	V. K. Krishna Menon	1949	1952	Residence in London
2	B. G. Kher	1952	1954	Residence in London
3	Vijaya Lakshmi Nehru Pandit	1955	1961	Residence in London
4	M. C. Chagla	1962	1963	Residence in London
5	Raj Krishna Tandon	1965	1968	
6	Anthony Grevi Meneses	1968	1971	
7	S. V. Patel	1971	1974	
8	Prithi Singh	1975	1977	
9	Nagendra Nath Jha	1977	1979	
10	Manabendra Shah	1980	1983	
11	Kiran Kumar Doshi	1983	1986	
12	Prem Shunker	1986	1990	
13	R. C. Arora	1990	1991	
14	C. P. Ravindranathan	1991	1992	
15	S. N. Puri	1992	1994	
16	H. C. S. Dhody	1995	1998	
17	Chokila Iyer	1999	2001	
18	Prabhakar Menon	2001	2003	
19	Saurabh Kumar	2003	2007	
20	P. S. Raghavan	2007	2011	
21	Debashish Chakravarty	2011	2013	
22	Radhika Lal Lokesh	2013	2016	
23	Vijay Thakur Singh	2016	2018	
24	Sandeep Kumar	2018	2021	
25	Akhilesh Mishra	2021	2026	
26	Manish Gupta	April 2026	Incumbent	

== See also ==
- India–Ireland relations
