= Rishi Vohra =

Indian novelist

- Rishi Vohra at Chandigarh Literati in 2015
- Writing career
- Language: English (Novels and Columns)
- Genre: Fiction
- Website: rishivohra.com

Rishi Vohra is an Indian novelist, known for his novels The Day My Soul Died, The Love Story We Wrote, Diary of an Angry Young Man, I am M-M-Mumbai, HiFi in Bollywood and Once Upon the Tracks of Mumbai.

== Early life ==
Rishi Vohra grew up in Mumbai, Maharashtra. He is of Punjabi Khatri descent, born to a Hindu father and a Sikh mother. He completed his schooling from Bombay Scottish School and junior college at Jai Hind College. After his HSC, he went to the U.S. for higher studies and completed a B.S. degree in Corporate Finance from Arizona State University in Tempe, Arizona and an Associate of Arts degree in film from Scottsdale Community College in Scottsdale, Arizona. After working in the entertainment industry for several years, he returned to the U.S. and completed an MBA in Sustainability from San Francisco State University in San Francisco, California and a Masters Diploma in Environmental Law from World Wildlife Fund. He is also a Certified Specialist of Wine from the Society of Wine Educators, United States and Alfiere Italico – Wine Cultore (Italy).

== Career ==
=== AdFilm Production ===
Rishi started his career in Ad Filmmaking under Prahlad Kakkar. During that time, he worked on several renowned campaigns such as Brooke Bond, Maggi, and Rexona.

=== Feature films ===
He worked as an assistant director under filmmakers Sohail Khan and Shimit Amin. He worked on films Pyaar Kiya To Darna Kya, Hello Brother, Maine Dil Tujhko Diya and Ab Tak Chhappan.

=== Television ===
While working for Sohail Khan, he directed a television show, Chehre Pe Chehra. He has also worked as a producer for Sony Entertainment Television (India).

=== Music videos ===
He directed the music video of the song "Kya Yehi Pyaar Hai" sung by Kamaal Khan and the promotional video of the song "Aaja Nindiya" composed by Sangeet-Siddharth and featured in Aatma.

=== Live events ===
He has directed star shows and live events.

== Filmography ==
- Pyaar Kiya To Darna Kya
- Hello Brother
- Maine Dil Tujhko Diya (2002)
- Ab Tak Chhappan (2004)

== Novels ==
- Once Upon the Tracks of Mumbai (2012) – Jaico Publishing House
- HiFi in Bollywood (2015) – Jaico Publishing House
- Short story "The Mysterious Couple," in the anthology Something Happened on the Way to Heaven (2014) by Sudha Murthy – Penguin Books
- I am M-M-Mumbai (2018) -
- Short story "Kaala Baba," in the anthology City of Screams (2019) by Neil D'Silva – Half Baked Beans
- Diary of an Angry Young Man (2021) -
- The Love Story We Wrote (2023) -
- The Day My Soul Died (2026) -

== Book awards ==
Once Upon the Tracks of Mumbai was long listed for the Crossword Book Award (2013) and awarded an Honorable Mention at the Hollywood Book Festival in Los Angeles, California.

== Affiliations ==
- Indo-Italian Chamber of Commerce and Industry (IICCI) – Alfiere Italico – Wine Cultore (Italy)
- Film Writers Association
- Society of Wine Educators, USA – Certified Specialist of Wine (CSW)
- Bombay Judo Club (Black Belt – National Judo Federation of India)
- Net Impact
- Sigma Pi

== See also ==
- List of Indian writers
