= Vicky Ratnani =

Indian chef (born 1968)

- Born: Mumbai, Maharashtra, India
- Education: IHM, Mumbai
- Occupation: Chef
- Spouse: Piya Ratnani
- Children: Tanisha Ratnani
- Relatives: Dabboo Ratnani (brother)

Vicky Ratnani is an Indian chef. He has a cooking show on NDTV called Vicky Goes Veg, as well as a cookbook by the same name. He also has a cooking show on LivingFoodz called "vickypedia". He won the best Indian Chef of the Year 2015.
