= Kurseong College =

College in West Bengal

Coordinates: 26.8801°N 88.2809°E

- Type: Undergraduate college
- Established: 1967; 59 years ago
- Affiliations: University of North Bengal
- Academic staff: 50
- Administrative staff: 18
- Location: Dow Hill Road, Kurseong, Darjeeling, West Bengal 734203, India
- Campus: Urban
- Website: kurseongcollege.net

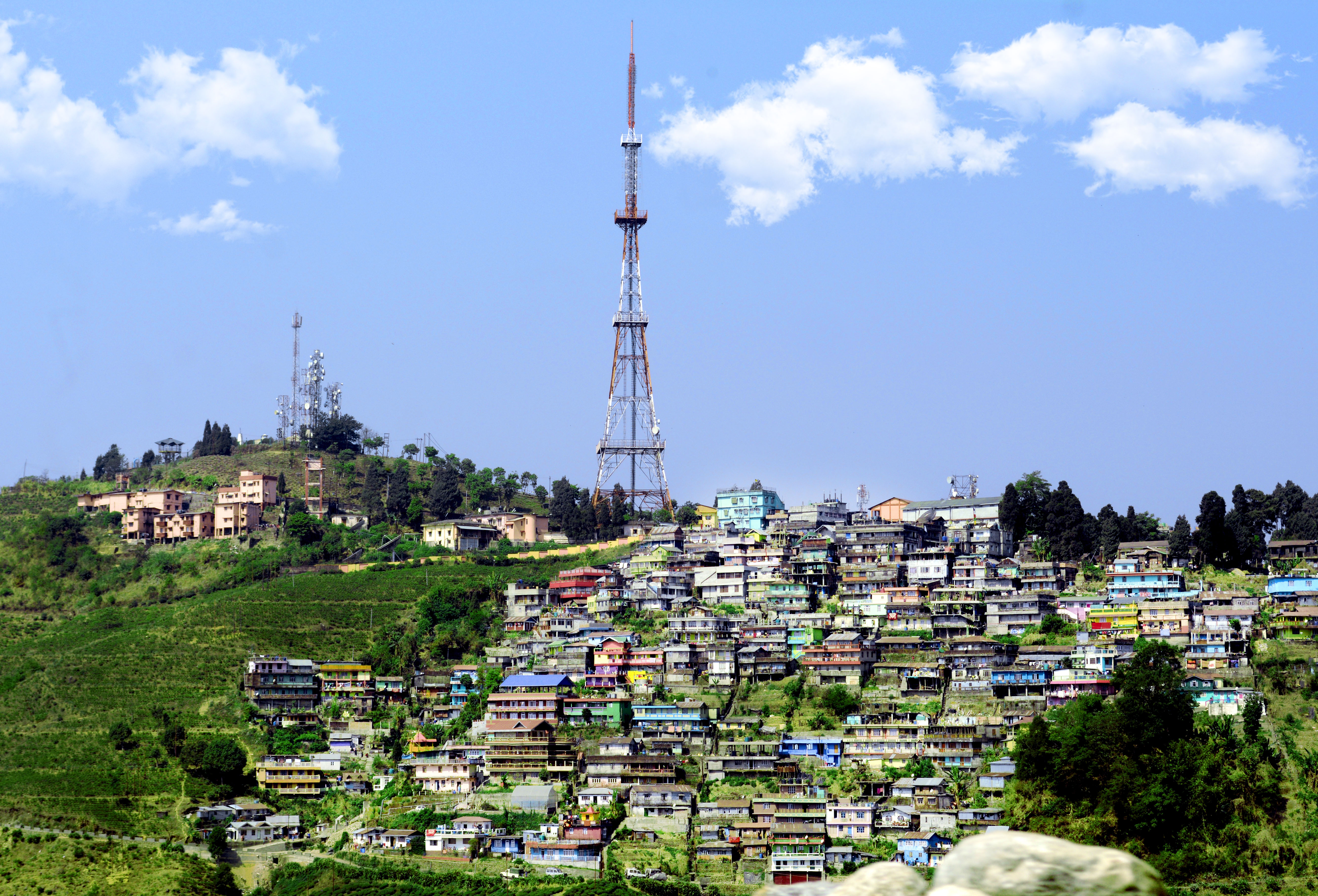
Kurseong town

Kurseong College is a co-educational institute of higher learning and the oldest college in Kurseong, Darjeeling. It offers undergraduate courses in arts, commerce and science and is affiliated to the University of North Bengal.

== Courses and specialisms ==
BA - Bachelor of Arts (3 Years)
B. A. Honours in English
B. A. Honours in Nepali
B. A. Honours in History
B. A. Honours in Geography
B. A. Honours in Political Science
B. A. Honours in Economics
B. A. General Course with English, History, Sociology, Geography, Nepali, Political Science, Economics as elective subjects

B.Sc - Bachelor of Science (3 Years)
B. Sc. Honours in Chemistry
B. Sc. Honours in Mathematics
B. Sc. General (Bio Science) – Botany, Zoology and Chemistry
B. Sc. General (Pure science) – Physics, Chemistry and Mathematics

B.Com - Bachelor of Commerce
B. Com Honours in Accounting
B. Com General

== Departments ==
=== Science ===
- Chemistry
- Physics
- Mathematics
- Botany
- Zoology

=== Arts and Commerce ===
- English
- Nepali
- Urdu
- History
- Geography
- Political Science
- Philosophy
- Economics
- Commerce

== Accreditation ==
The college is recognised by the University Grants Commission (UGC). It has been re-accredited and awarded B grade by the National Assessment and Accreditation Council (NAAC).

== Facilities ==
- Library

Year of Establishment	1967
Library Hours	10:00 a.m. – 3:00 p.m.(Monday to Friday) 10:00 a.m. – 1:00 p.m.(Saturday)
Total books collection as on 31/03/2017	22,244
Carpet Area	2530 square feet
Sitting Capacity in a Reading Room	60
Library Access	Mixed Access
Status of Automation	Under Process
Library Software	Koha
Number of Staff	5

- Student canteen
- Science laboratory
- Girls hostel - A Girls’ hostel is located within the college campus. It can provide accommodation to 24 boarders

== See also ==
- List of institutions of higher education in West Bengal
- Education in India
- Education in West Bengal
