= Socially Useful Productive Work =

Component of the Indian education system

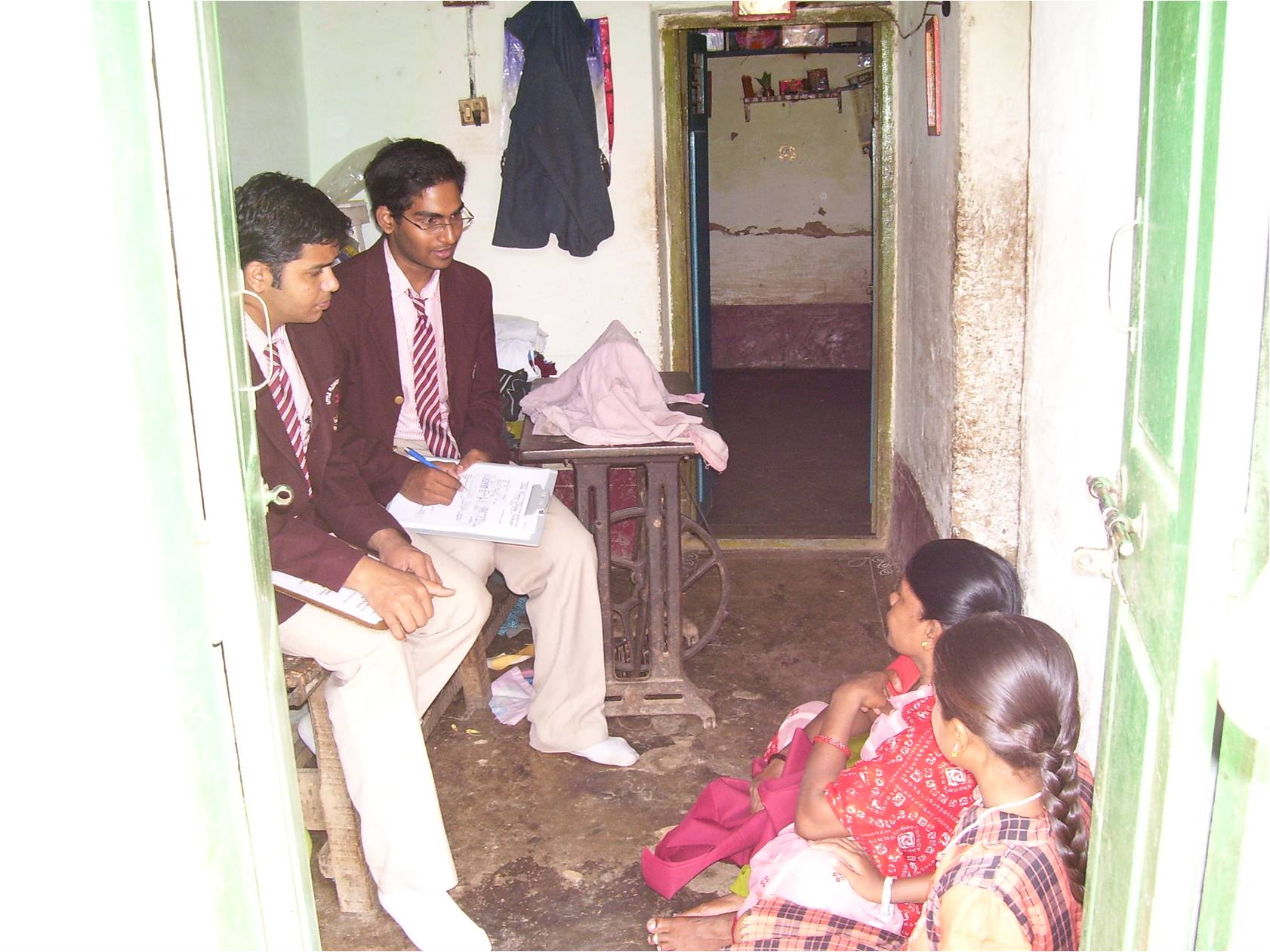
Students of Little Flower Public School, Bangalore working in Narayanapura area as a part of SUPW

Socially Useful Productive Work (SUPW) is a "purposive productive work and services related to the needs of the child and the community, which will be proved meaningful to the learner. Such work must not be performed mechanically but must include planning, analysis and detailed preparation, at every stage so that it is educational. Adoption of improved tools and materials, where available and the adoption of modern techniques will lead to an appreciation of the needs of a progressive society based on technology." Students learn to work as a team, with skill and deftness. It was introduced in 1978, by the Ministry of Education in India to promote Gandhian values and educational ideas of Mahatma Gandhi.

SUPW remains an ancillary, but a mandatory part of the course curriculum in schools affiliated with the Council for the Indian School Certificate Examinations (CISCE), which conducts two examinations in India: the Indian Certificate of Secondary Education (ICSE) and the Indian School Certificate (ISC). It is taught in some Central Board of Secondary Education (CBSE) schools, which include Kendriya Vidyalaya and Jawahar Navodaya Vidyalaya schools.

In addition to developing individual skills, SUPW helps in developing among the students the habit to work as a community, increase awareness of scientific advancements and develop a scientific outlook. The training acquired in the classroom helps students solve the day-to-day problems of the community.

== History ==
SUPW may be described as purposive and meaningful manual work, resulting in either goods or services which are meaningful to the society.

— Report of Review Committee, 1977

Recommending education through craft, Mahatma Gandhi said, "The core of my suggestion, is to give skills and knowledge in craft to students from 8th standard and goes on until the students have reached the 12th standard. It is for both production of work and for developing intellect of the pupils". This idea was taken forward by the Kothari Commission (1964–66), which suggested introduction of 'work experience' in education. Subsequently, after the recommendations of 'Ishwarbhai Patel Committee' (July, 1977), which first coined the term 'Socially Useful Productive Work' or SUPW, the subject was first introduced to the school curriculum in 1978, by Ministry of Education, Government of India.

== Crafts and Hobbies ==
As per the "Program of Action of the National Policy on Education of 1986", which emphasizes the promotion of culture and creativity in school children, SUPW curriculum may also include, Pottery, Clay Modeling, Papier-mâché, Mask Making, Tie & Dye, Rangoli, Wall decoration, Cane work, Bamboo work, Bookbinding, Paper toys, etc.

== Additional sources ==
- Socially Useful Productive Work Board of Secondary Education, Madhya Pradesh
- S. K. Kochhar (2007). "12: Socially Useful Productive Work (SUPW) in Education". Pivotal Issues In Indian Education. Pocket Books. ISBN 978-8128812118.
- Tarun Rashtriya (2008). "Work Experience and SUPW". Vocational Education. APH Publishing. p. 85. ISBN 978-8176488648.

== See also ==
- Mike Cooley Irish-born engineer, writer and trade union leader, best known for his work on the social effects of technology, "Socially Useful Production" and "Human Centred Systems".
