= Kurseong =

- Town
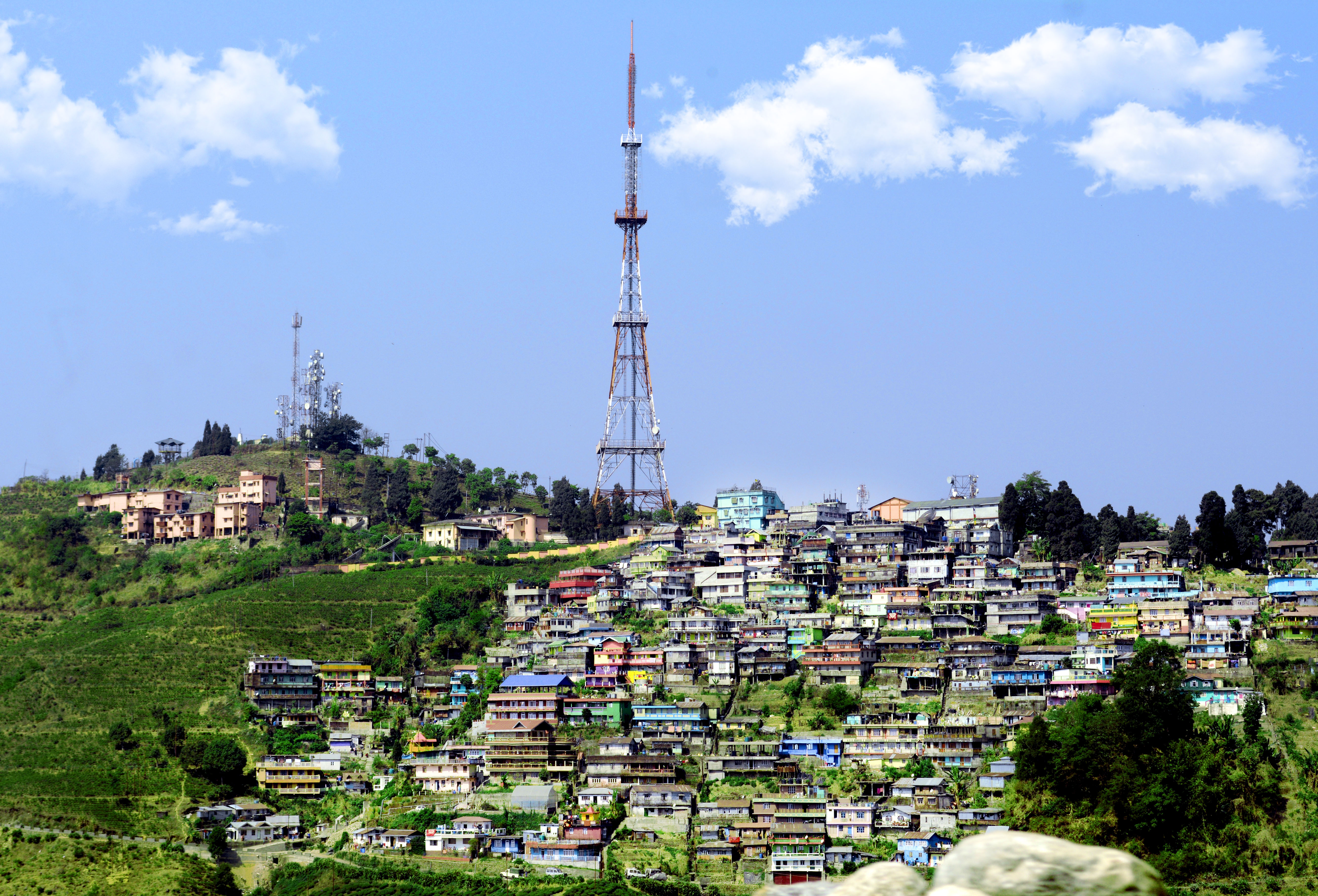
- Panorama of Kurseong
- Nickname: The School Town
- Location in West Bengal, India Kurseong (India)
- Coordinates: 26°52′40″N 88°16′38″E
- Country: India
- State: West Bengal
- District: Darjeeling

Government
  - Type: Municipality
  - Body: Kurseong Municipality

Area
  - Total: 7.50 km^{2} (2.90 sq mi)
- Elevation: 1,500 m (4,900 ft)

Population (2011)
  - Total: 42,446
  - Density: 5,660/km^{2} (14,700/sq mi)

Languages
  - Official: Bengali, Nepali & Hindi.
- Time zone: UTC+5:30 (IST)
- PIN: 734 203
- Telephone code: 0354
- Vehicle registration: WB-76, WB-77
- Lok Sabha constituency: Darjeeling
- Vidhan Sabha constituency: Kurseong
- Website: www.kurseongmunicipality.org

Kurseong (Nepali pronunciation: [ˈkʰʌrsaŋ], Bengali pronunciation: [ˈkaɾʃi̯aŋ]) is a town and a municipality in Darjeeling district in the Indian state of West Bengal. It is the headquarters of the Kurseong subdivision.

Located at an altitude of 1,482.55 metres (4,864.0 ft), Kurseong is 32 kilometres (20 mi) from Darjeeling and has a pleasant climate throughout the year.

Kurseong is 34 kilometres (21 mi) from Siliguri and is connected to the city by road and the Darjeeling Himalayan Railway. The nearest airport is at Bagdogra and the nearest major railway station is New Jalpaiguri, which is about 45 kilometres (28 mi) from the town. The economy is based primarily on education and tourism.

== Etymology ==
The origin of the name is unclear; stories suggest it comes from the Lepcha language word for "small orchid", kurson-rip because of the little white orchids (Coelogyne cristata) dotting the valleys, or perhaps the term for a stick made out of a local cane.(O'Malley 1999, p. 216)

== History ==
The original inhabitants were the Lepcha people, who named their home "Kurseong", because every spring it was alive and bright with Kurson-Rip orchids. In the remote past, Kurseong was a part of the Kingdom of Sikkim, even before the British came to India. However, in around 1780 the Kingdom of Nepal conquered and annexed Kurseong and its surrounding areas. Then came the Gurkha War, which the Nepalese lost. The 1817 Treaty of Titalia restored Kurseong to Sikkim.

With its mountains providing a cool and dry environment in the summer, Kurseong was a favourite of the British. Nevertheless, they found travelling there from the plains of Bengal difficult, even on warm sunny days because of the mountains. Although a road was built from Kurseong to Darjeeling from Titalia in the 1770s and 1780s, its irregular maintenance soon made the new route, the Military Road, almost useless. The next route, Hill Cart Road (now Tenzing Norgay Road), opened in 1861 and fared better.

Nevertheless, in 1835 the British decided that Darjeeling would make an excellent sanitorium and summer residence for their military and civilian officers along with their families. Negotiations with the Chogyal of Sikkim, Tshudpud Namgyal, provided them a strip of hill territory in Kurseong for an annual fee. As one of the hill stations on the road to Darjeeling, Kurseong began to develop.

Kurseong is home to one of the oldest municipalities in the state of West Bengal. Established as an independent Municipality in 1879, it did not become a Sub-Division until 1890, when the District of Darjeeling was formed. Kurseong and the District were added to the Rajshahi Division (now West Central Bangladesh) by the British Raj for the Bengal Presidency. In 1908, they were transferred to the Bhagalpur Division in the same Presidency.

Before Independence from the British, there were 12 ward commissioners. Four of them were appointed by the British Raj and it also appointed its own man, the Sub-Divisional Officer (S.D.O.), as their chairman. In 1939, when Bengal became a province of British India, Kurseong was allowed to elect its own member to be the chairman, but the Raj continued to send ward commissioners until India gained independence. Nevertheless, between 1939 and 1942, Kurseong grew rapidly. As of today Kurseong has 20 commissioners.

== Geography ==
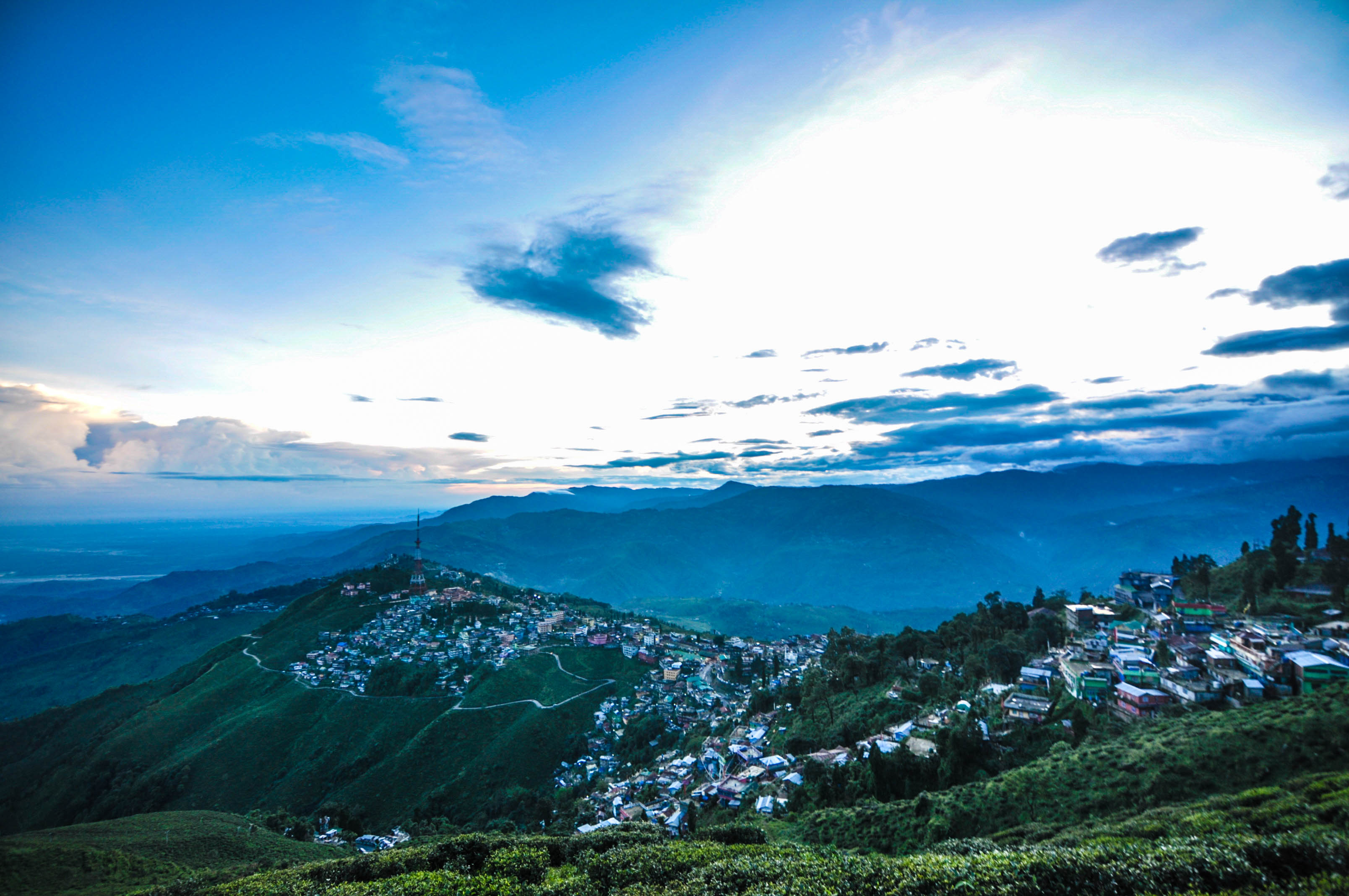
View of downtown Kurseong in the early evening.

Places and tea estates in the north-eastern portion of Darjeeling Sadar subdivision (including Rangli Rangliot CD block) and Kurseong subdivision in Darjeeling district
CT: census town, R: rural/ urban centre, N: neighbourhood, H: hill centre, NP: national park/ wildlife sanctuary, TE: tea estate, TA: tourist attraction
Abbreviations used in names – TG for Tea Garden (town/village), TE for Tea Estate
Owing to space constraints in the small map, the actual locations in a larger map may vary slightly

=== Location ===
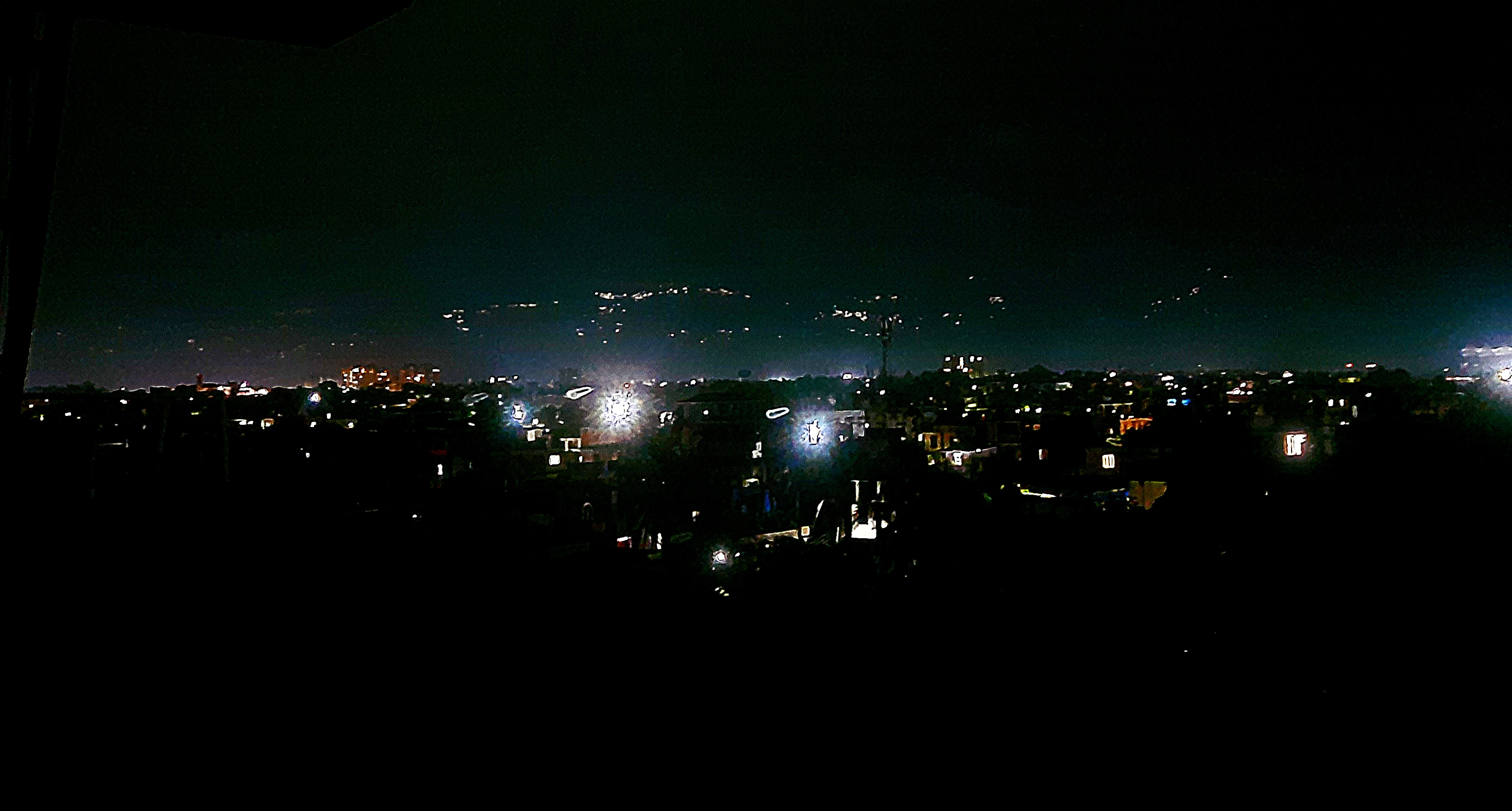
Night view of Kurseong town and Tindharia as viewed from Siliguri

Kurseong is located at 26°52′40″N 88°16′38″E.

=== Area overview ===
The map alongside shows the eastern portion of the Darjeeling Himalayan hill region and a small portion of the terai region in its eastern and southern fringes, all of it in the Darjeeling district. In the Darjeeling Sadar subdivision 61.00% of the total population lives in the rural areas and 39.00% of the population lives in the urban areas. In the Kurseong subdivision 58.41% of the total population lives in the rural areas and 41.59% lives in the urban areas. There are 78 tea gardens/ estates (the figure varies slightly according to different sources), in the district, producing and largely exporting Darjeeling tea. It engages a large proportion of the population directly/ indirectly. Some tea gardens were identified in the 2011 census as census towns or villages. Such places are marked in the map as CT (census town) or R (rural/ urban centre). Specific tea estate pages are marked TE.

Note: The map alongside presents some of the notable locations in the subdivision. All places marked in the map are linked in the larger full screen map.

=== Sights ===
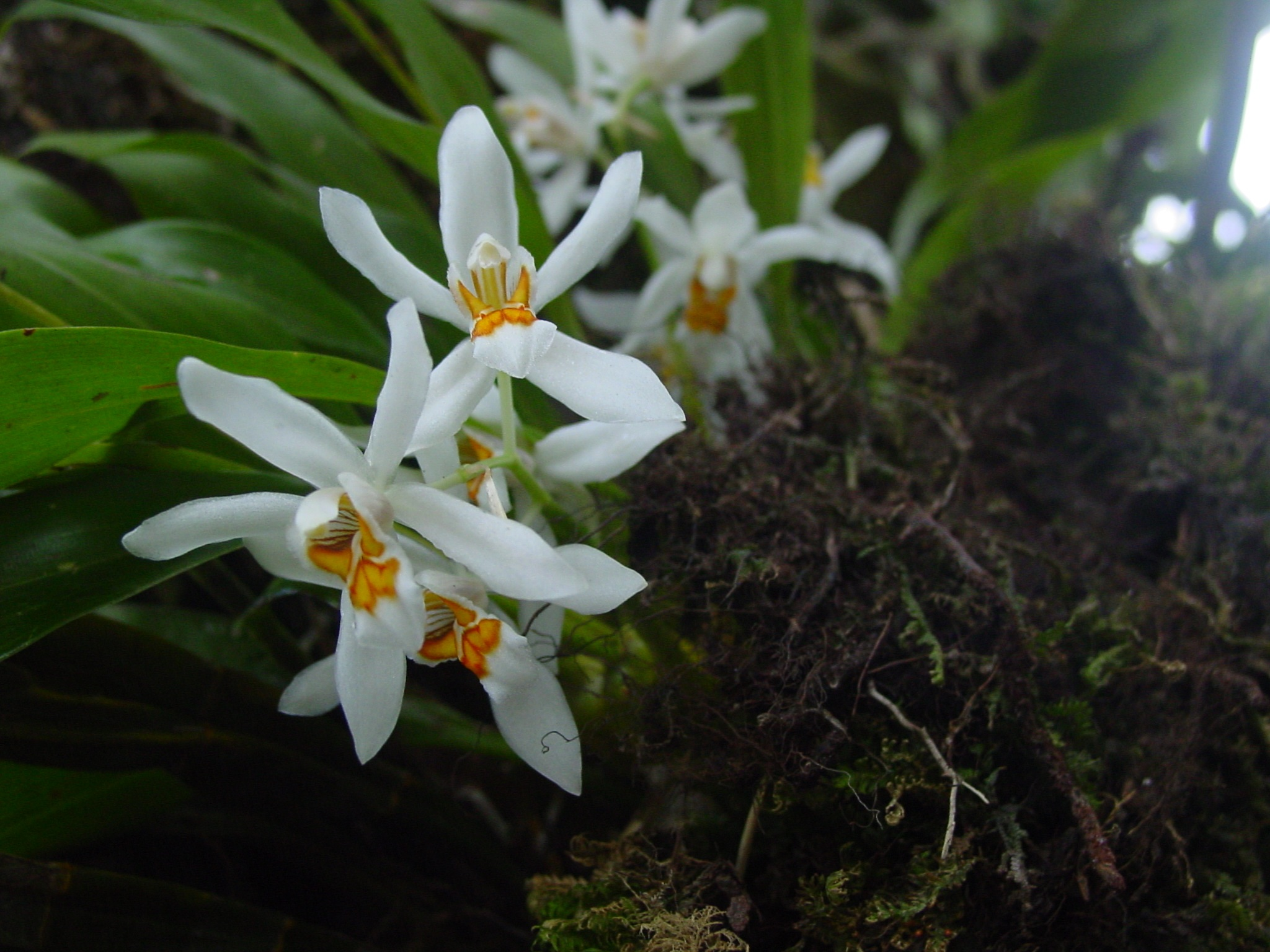
Coelogyne cristata, the white orchid from Kurseong

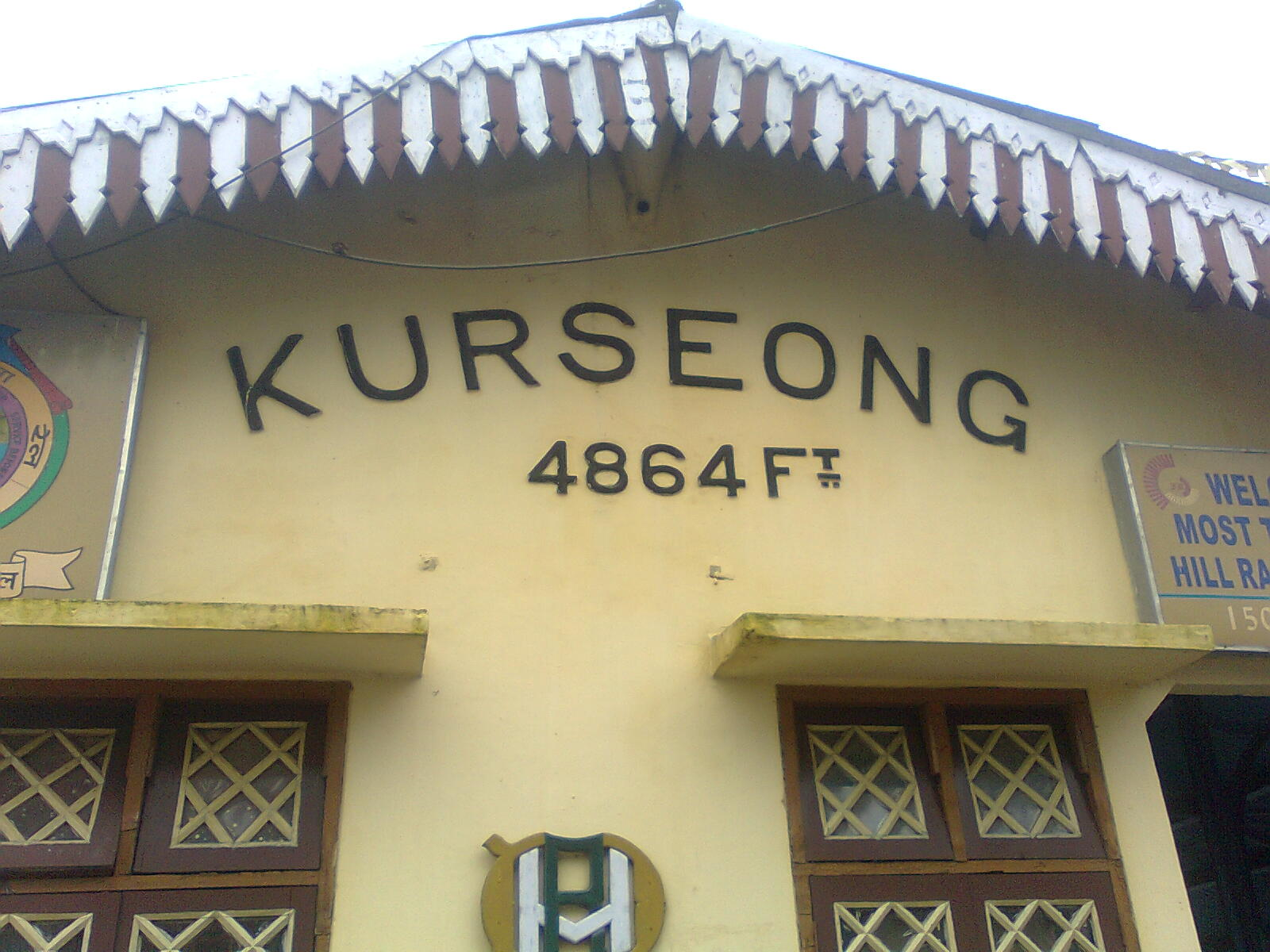
Kurseong Railway Station

Kurseong is surrounded by a myriad of tea gardens. These include Castleton, Makaibari, Ambootia, although Castleton and Ambootia do not give tours.

The tracks of the 'Darjeeling Toy Train' run the length of the town, and the station is the nucleus of the town.

=== Religious sites ===
- The Ambootia Shiva Temple.
- Giddha Pahar Sita Ram Mandir
- Giddah Pahar Durga Mata Mandir.
- Jagdish Mandir - The Jagdish temple has very old idols (almost 300 years old) of Lord Jagannath (Lord Krishna). The specialty of this temple is that there are two idols of Lord Jagannath (Krishna).
- Shree Shyam Mandir- Just behind the Jagdish Mandir temple there is a magnificent temple devoted to Shree Shyam Baba which is almost 200 years old.
- St. Paul's Church on Hill Cart Road, near St. Joseph's School.
- Buddhist Gompa (monastery) in Monteviot.
- Kunsang Choiling Monastery at Upper Naya Busty.
- Juma Mosque in Hat Bazaar.
- Grotto and Catholic church in St. Mary's Hill.
- Sath Kaniya Devi Mandir at Uzari Busty Ward No 19 P B Road

=== Natural sites ===
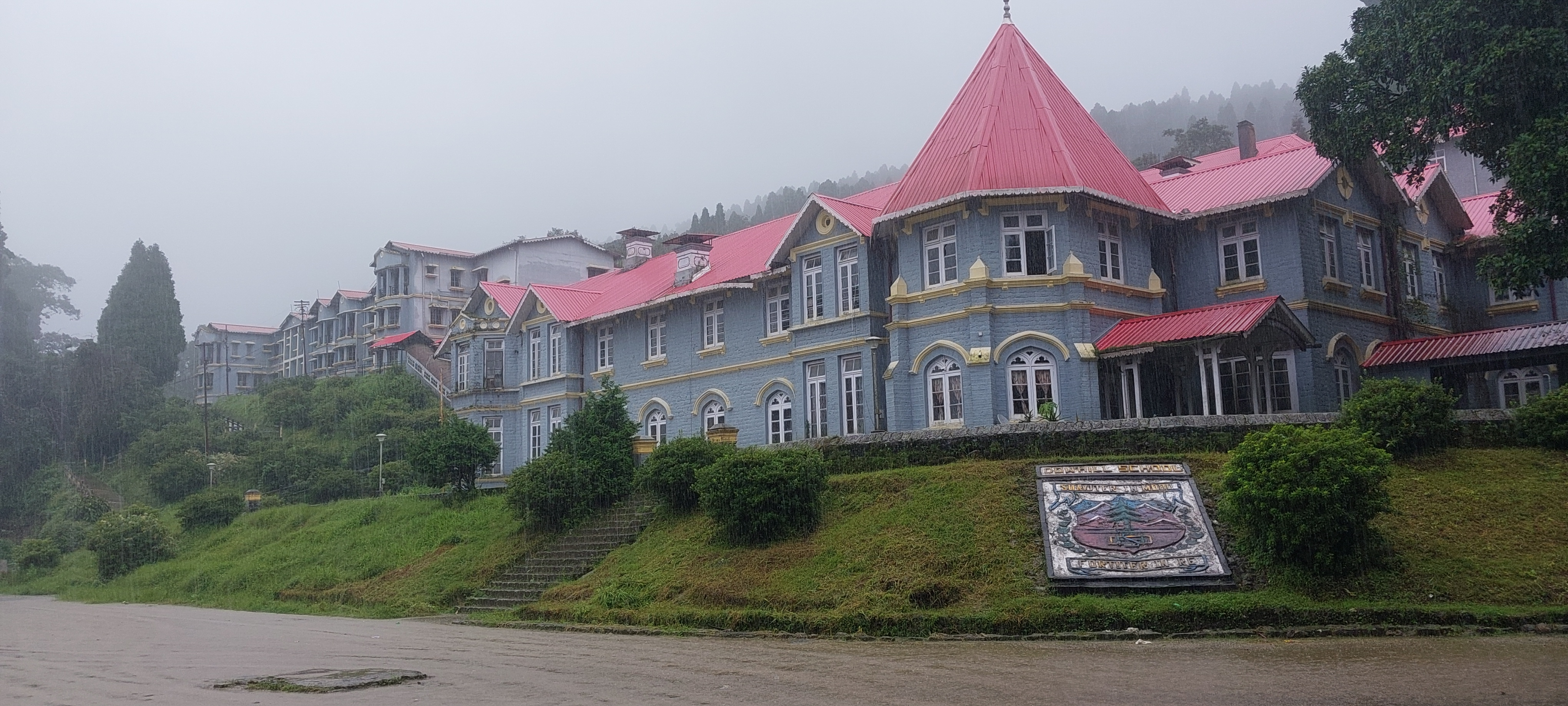
Dow Hill School in Kurseong

- Eagle's Craig. It is situated in the centre of the town and is a viewpoint from which there are views of the tea estates, surrounding mountains, hills, hamlets, and slopes. It also has a water reservoir that supplies water to the adjacent areas, an observatory or watchtower, a small flower garden with a variety of flowers, and a cafeteria serving local organic hand-picked tea.
- Rock garden. the tip of the valley.
- Deer Park - now known as Dowhill Park, on the Dowhill Road.
- The Kholas (Water Falls - Springs) like Whistle Khola (named by the British, as there is a bend and the toy train whistles when passing through it). It is also known as Hussel Khola (means river in the local language). Although relatively dry during the dry months of winter, it comes alive during the monsoon season.
- The Kettle Valley

=== Museums ===
- Netaji Subhas Chandra Bose Museum and NSC Bose Institute of Asiatic Studies, hosted in the house of his elder brother, Sarat Chandra Bose, are situated in the Giddhapahar area (5 to 10 minutes drive from the Railway station). Netaji was interned in this house by the British government in the late thirties. The house now displays priceless artifacts depicting the life of the freedom fighter. These include photocopies of the exchange of letters between Netaji and his would-be wife, Ms. Emilie, many rare photographs of his Indian National Army (INA), other memorabilia of the Indian Freedom Movement and a few personal belongings of Netaji and the Bose Family.

=== Other sites ===
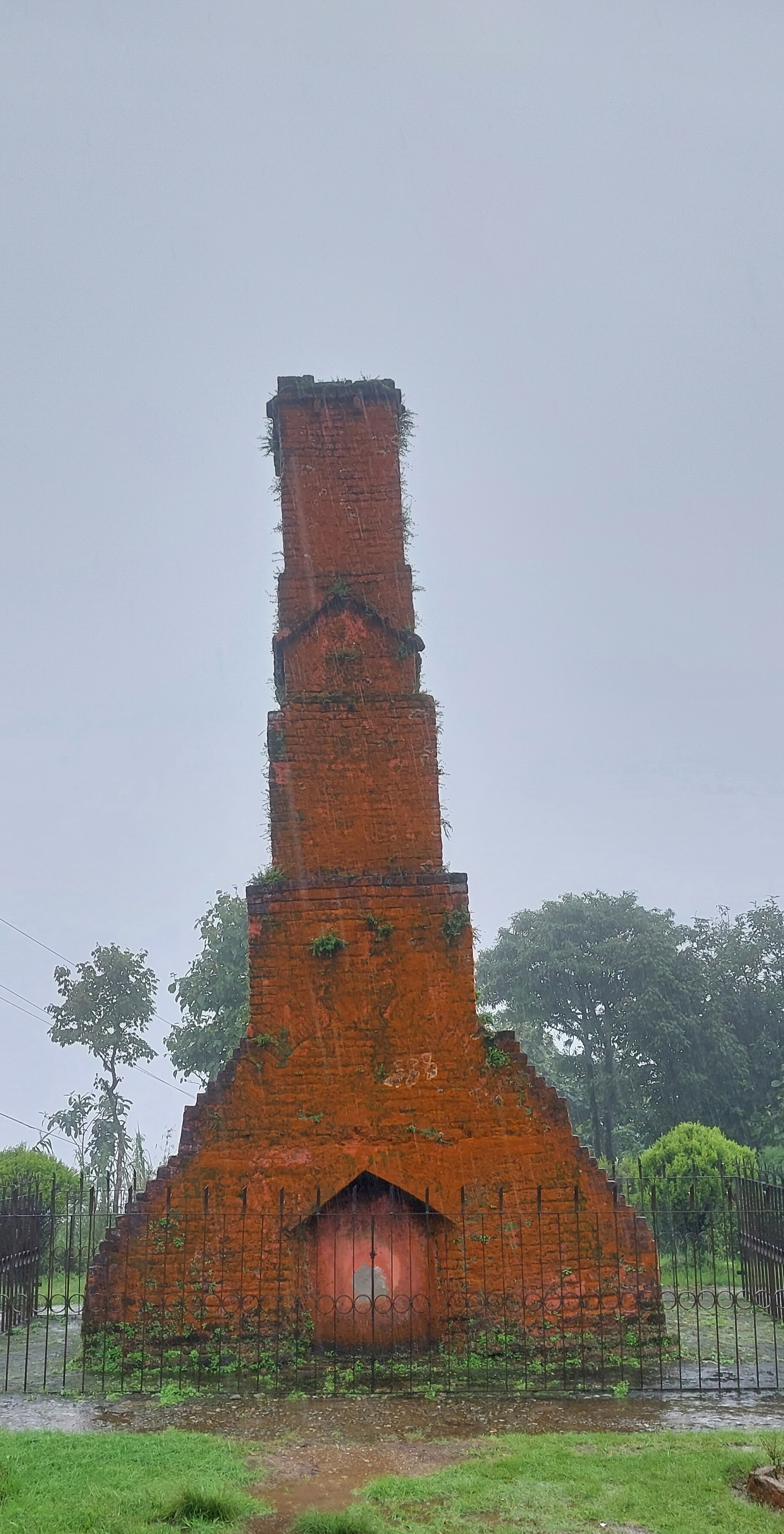
Chimney, the heritage British structure in Kurseong

- Chimney: A walk or ride through the forest of Cryptomaria Japonica on the road, now called Aranya Sarani, leads to open meadows at Chimney. The curious name of the place is reminiscent of the days when there was a bungalow here on the only road (Old Military Road) leading to Darjeeling. A long, dilapidated chimney, standing all alone, is the only remnant of the bungalow now.
- Naya Busty Park: Located just above the Netaji Subhas Chandra Bose Museum.
- All India Radio Kurseong: Broadcasting station operated by All India Radio for its Nepali language radio station - Akashvani Kurseong.
- Kurseong Cemetery

== Civic administration ==
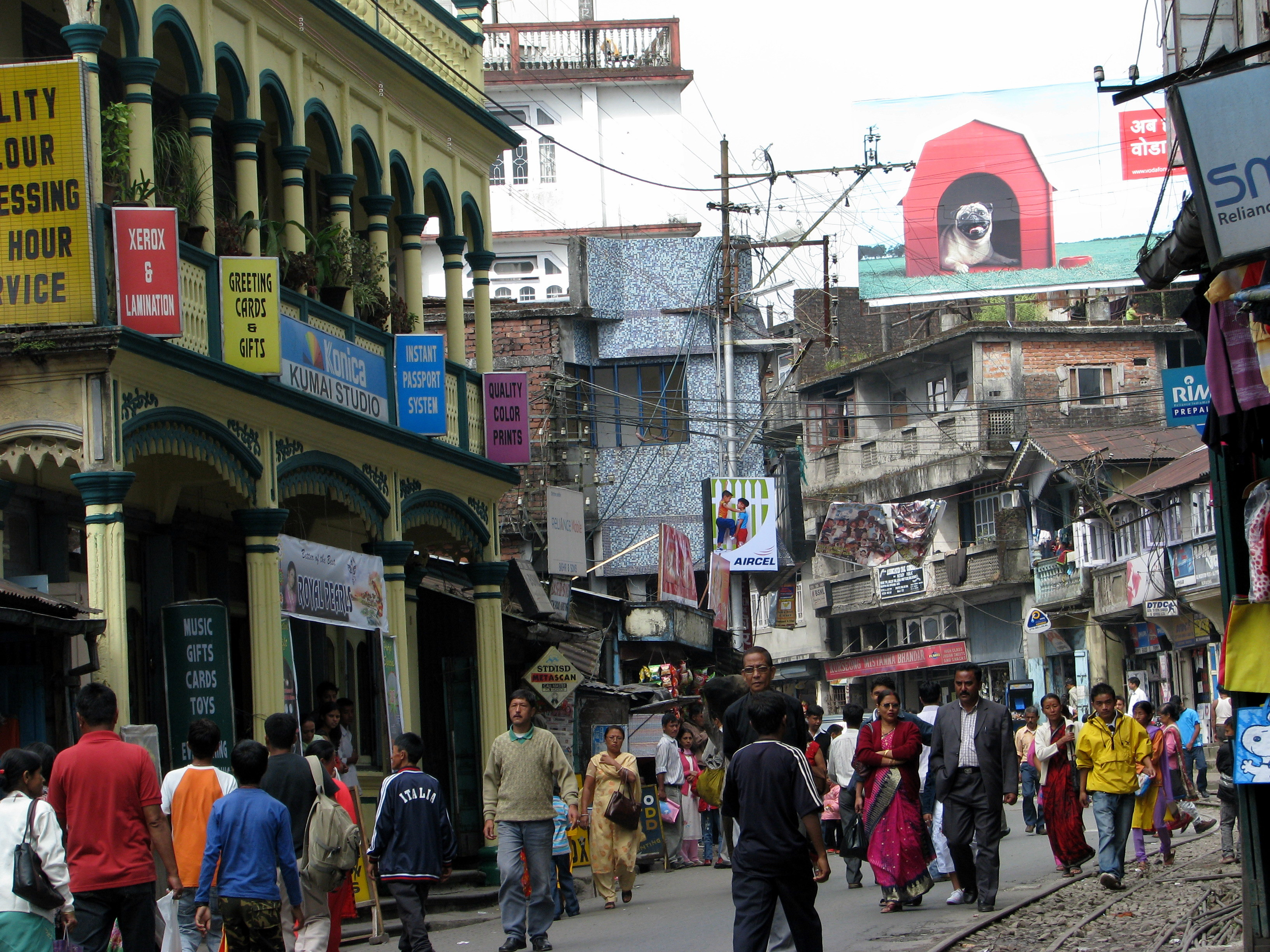
A busy road in Kurseong

Kurseong Municipality, which is over 125 years old (one of the oldest in the country), is the main civic administration body for the town of Kurseong. It is located at 13 Dowhill Road. The Municipality is divided into 20 wards [originally 12 wards] and each of the wards has its own ward commissioner. The current Chairman of the Municipal Committee is Mr. Birga Gurung, presiding office since 10 June 2021.

The previous chairman, until 2008, was Mr. P. C. Agarwal. But in early March 2008 his political party, the Gorkha National Liberation Front (GNLF), lost the control of the Committee in a no-confidence vote to the other Gorkha political party, the Gorkha Janmukti Morcha (GJMM). Since 2007, the GJMM has been campaigning for the creation of a separate state for the Indian Gorkhas, the original goal of the GNLF. Because of the no-confidence vote, Mr. Agarwal was forced to resign and the Municipal Committee was suspended.

Kurseong has its own Munsif Magistrate Court and has the Police Station and Town Out Post in P B Road. The S.D.O. (Sub Divisional Officer) is the head of the administration for the Town.

Hospital and Health Care in Kurseong: Kurseong has a Sub Divisional Hospital and no private nursing homes or clinics unlike Kalimpong and Darjeeling.

=== Library ===
Gorkha Public Library or Gorkha jana pustakalay was established in the year 1913, as an initiative of the Indian Gorkhas to develop their culture, language and literature in the small town of Kurseong. It was probably the first Nepali public library project. This small initiative played a vital role in the development of Indian Gorkha culture, language and literature. The library still exists today, and among other things is used as a polling station in local elections.

Bloomfield Library: A well stocked library opposite of the post office.

== Education ==
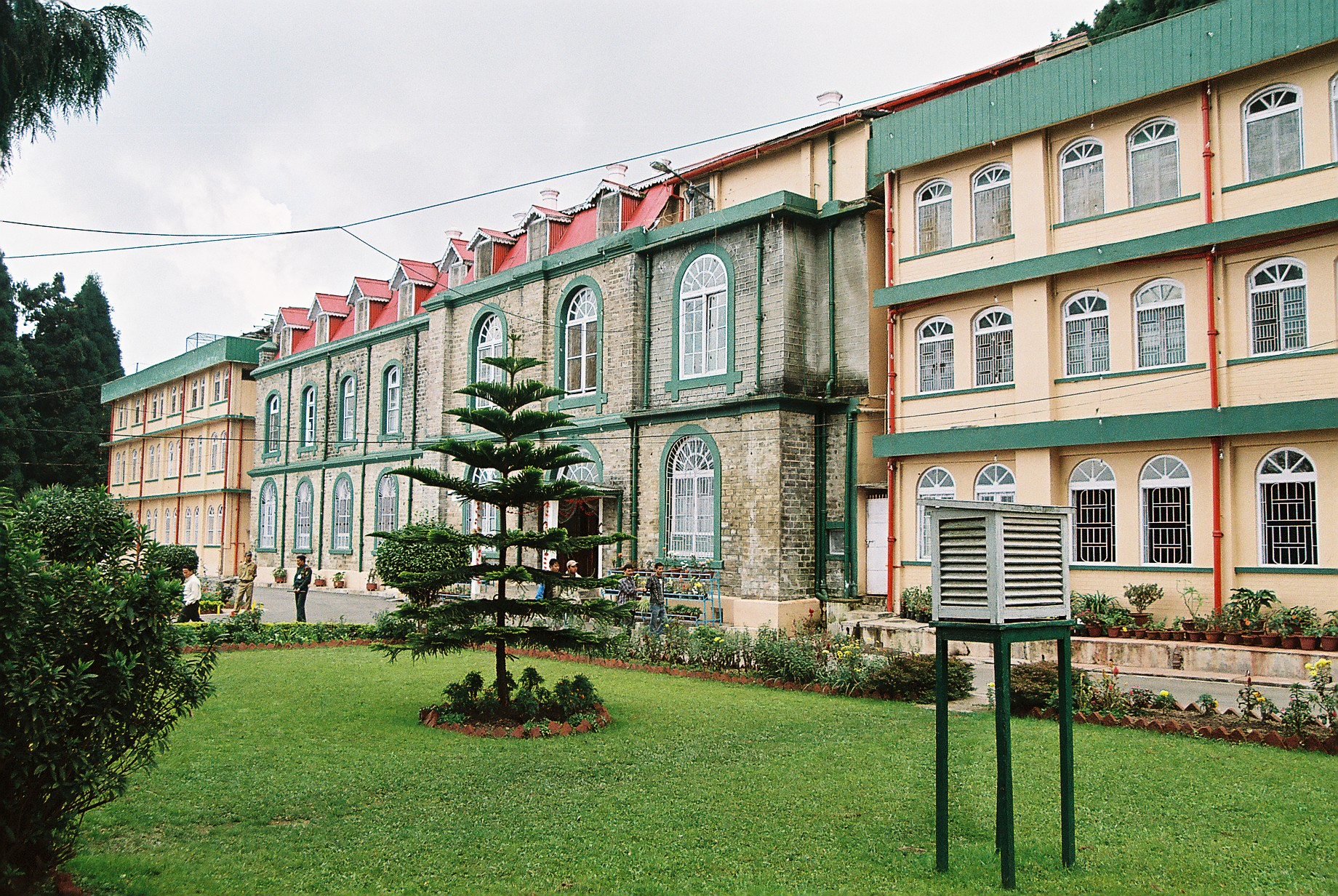
Goethals Memorial School

Housing a number of schools, Kurseong is popularly nicknamed as "the school town" due to the emergence of many new schools in the town. The schools can be classified into two distinct groups. The English Medium and the Nepali Medium. The English medium schools are mostly affiliated to the Indian Certificate of Secondary Education, Delhi while the Nepali Medium Schools are affiliated to the State Education Board i.e. West Bengal Board of Secondary Education, Calcutta. Only one school Godwin Modern School is affiliated to the Central Board of Secondary Education, Delhi in Kurseong Town.

=== University Colleges ===
Kurseong has one college Kurseong College which is affiliated to the University of North Bengal. It provides undergraduate studies - Bachelor of Arts (General and Honours), Bachelor of Science and Bachelor of Commerce (General).

Darjeeling Polytechnic College offers courses in Civil, Computer and Electrical.

From 1889 to 1971 there was even a theological college on St. Mary's hill (2 kilometres (1.2 mi) north on the way to Darjeeling) training the Jesuit seminarians to the Catholic priesthood until it was shifted to Delhi under the new name of Vidyajyoti College of Theology.

The old Theologate's building now hosts the Eastern Forest Rangers College, which provides training courses to the would-be Forest Rangers of India. There is a West Bengal Forest School near Deer Park and Victoria Boys School, Dowhill which also provides training for foresters as well.

About 6 kilometres (3.7 mi) north on the way to Darjeeling at Tung, there is an Industrial Training Institute (ITI) which offers various vocational course in plumbing, motor mechanics, and book binding.

=== Schools of Kurseong ===
ICSE & ISC STREAM

- St Anthony's School (Separate Schools for Boys and Girls)
- Dowhill school (co-ed till 3rd standard, All girls after that)
- Cambridge English School
- Little Flower School (Co-Ed)
- Himali Boarding School (Co-Ed)
- Goethals Memorial School (Boys)
- St. Helen's Secondary School (Girls)
- Jnaneshwar Memorial Academy
- Victoria Boys' School
- Daisies School
- Sunshine School
- Modern English School
- Glenhill Public School
- Bellvue School
- Carmel High School
- Bethany school

CBSE Stream

- Godwin Modern School

WBBSE Stream

- Ramakrishna Girls High School
- Pushparani Roy Memorial School
- St. Alphonsus School
- St. Joseph's Girls High School
- Scott's Mission School

=== Higher Secondary Vocational ===
- Holy Cross Institute (Class 11 & 12)

== Transport ==
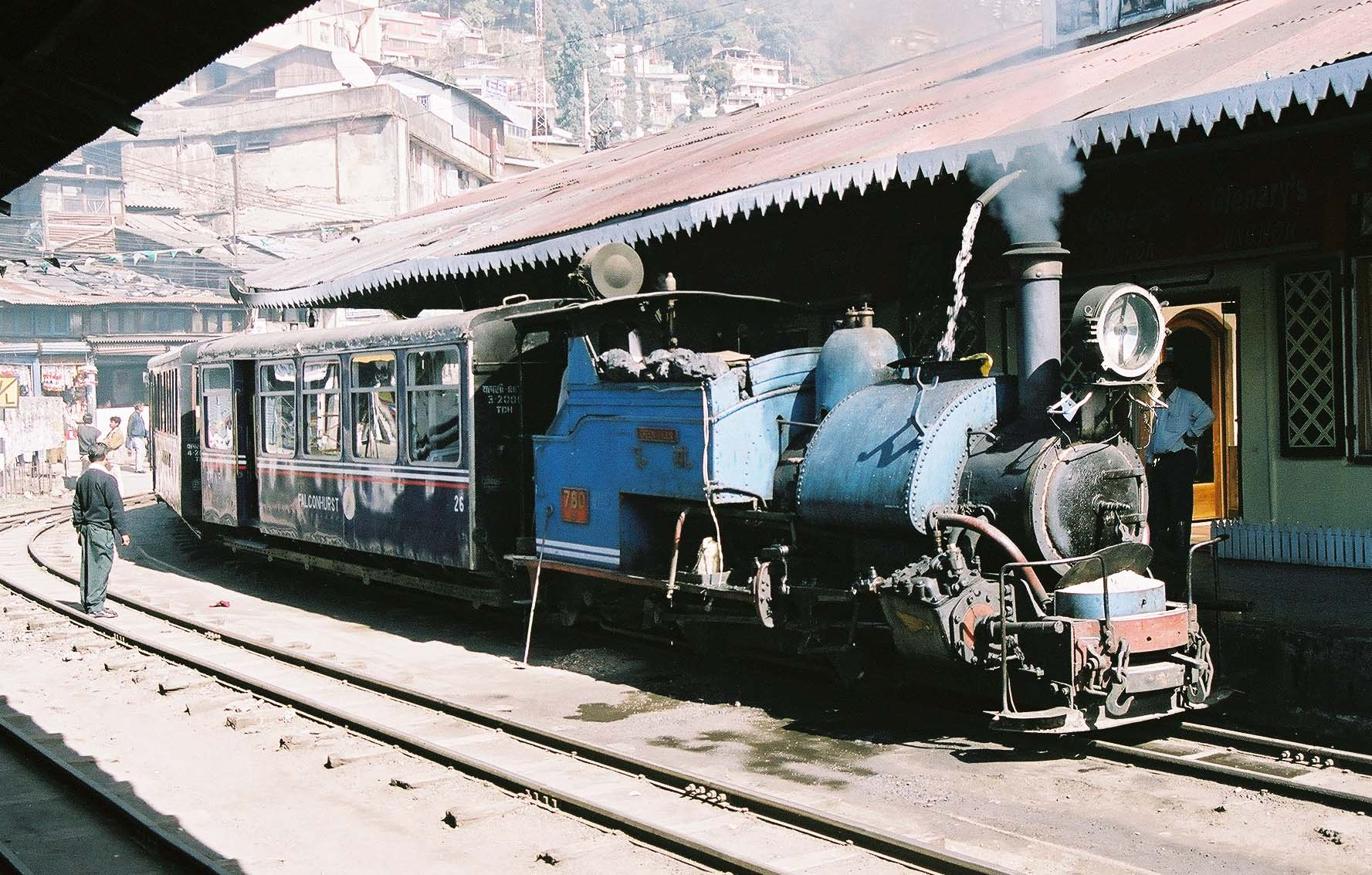
Kurseong Railway Station

Kurseong is considered as midpoint between Siliguri and Darjeeling. The nearest airport is the Bagdogra Airport and nearest major railway hub is New Jalpaiguri railway station. Kurseong is well connected to Siliguri, Darjeeling and Mirik. Several prepaid vehicles run from Kurseong to Darjeeling, Siliguri and Mirik. But Kurseong does not have a strong transport connection to Kalimpong and Gangtok. Only two vehicles to Gangtok and one vehicle to Kalimpong run from Kurseong every day. Taxis also run to Pankhabari, Ambootia, Mahanadi, Tindharia, Latpanchor. North Bengal state buses also run from Darjeeling to Siliguri and NJP Station via Kurseong.

Kurseong also has a railway station where Toy Train runs to New Jalpaiguri and Darjeeling. Kurseong Station is a part of Darjeeling Himalayan Railway and comes under Katihar Division of Northeast Frontier Railway.

There are three roads between Kurseong and Siliguri: National Highway, Pankhabari Road and Rohini Road.

== Demographics ==
In 2011, the population of Kurseong Municipality was 42,446. The rural area in Kurseong Block had a population of 94,347.

=== Languages ===
Languages spoken in Kurseong (2011)
1. Nepali (71.5%)
2. Hindi (13.8%)
3. Bengali (5.80%)
4. Urdu (2.71%)
5. Tibetan (1.32%)
6. Marwari (1.30%)
7. Others (3.50%)

=== Religion ===
Religion in Kurseong subdivision (2011)
Hinduism	74.00%
Buddhism	12.00%
Christianity	7.50%
Islam	5.50%
Others*	0.60%
Other or not stated	0.40%
Others includes faiths like Kirat Mundhum, Bon, Mun

Religion in Kurseong subdivision (2011)
Religion	2011	
Religion	Popul.	(%)
Hinduism	278,240	74.00%
Buddhism	45,120	12.00%
Christianity	28,200	7.50%
Islam	20,680	5.50%
Tribal religion	2,256	0.60%
Others (Note: Including Jainism, Buddhism, Zoroastrianism, Judaism, Kirat Mundhum, or not stated)	1,504	0.40%
Total Population	376,000	100%

Hinduism is the majority religion in Kurseong subdivision. Buddhism and Kirat Mundhum are primarily practiced in the hill communities. Christianity has a notable presence among hill populations and tea garden communities. Islam is present in smaller numbers, mainly in semi-urban and market areas.

== Media and communications ==
All India Radio operates a Nepali language radio station in Kurseong, broadcasting at a frequency of 103.5 MHz (webcast) It was established in the year 1962. In 2023, Prasar Bharati ordered Akashvani Kurseong to be upgraded as the hub for Nepali language content generation and broadcasting in India.

== Notable residents ==
- Ferdinand Perier (1875–1968), 3rd Archbishop of Calcutta (now Kolkata), (stayed during three years of his retirement (1962–1965))
- Jack Farj Rafael Jacob (1921–2016), Lieutenant General, Chief of Staff of the Indian Army's Eastern Command
- Jung Bahadur Rana (1816–1877), the Prime Minister of Nepal and the founder of the Rana dynasty of Nepal
- M. Fazlul Haque (b. 1938), High Court Justice of Bangladesh
- Helen Lepcha (1902–1980), freedom fighter who worked closely with Mahatma Gandhi, B.V. Patel, L.B. Shastri, C.R. Das and J.L. Nehru.
- Peter Sarstedt (1941–2017), musician and singer, attended Victoria Boys' School
- Sister Nivedita (1867–1911), Scots-Irish social worker, author, teacher and a disciple of Swami Vivekananda
- Dev Kumari Thapa (1928–2011), Nepali short story writer
- Banira Giri (1946–2021), Nepali poet and novelist (born and grew up in Kurseong, later moved to Kathmandu)
- Crispin Chettri (1975-present), Coach of Indian women's football team, a resident of Kurseong
