= Irish Indians =

Regions with significant populations
- Kolkata and Chennai.

Languages
- English (Irish · Indian) · Gaelic; Hindi · Other Indian languages

Religion
- Christianity (Catholicism · Pentecostalism) · Hinduism · Islam · Non-religious

Related ethnic groups
- Anglo-Indian; Irish diaspora; Indian diaspora

An Irish Indian is either an Indian-born person who is fully or partially of Irish descent, or an Irish-born person who is fully or partially of Indian descent. As per article 366(2) of the Indian Constitution, an Irish Indian can be categorized as an Anglo-Indian.

== History ==
Irish people were known to have traveled to India from at least the days of the East India Company. While most of the early Irish came as traders, some also came as soldiers. Prominent among them were the generals Arthur Wellesley, 1st Duke of Wellington who later became Prime Minister of the United Kingdom and his brother, Lord Charles Wellesley, both of whom were from the Protestant Anglo-Irish landowning class. During the 19th century, a number of missionaries and educationists were involved in setting-up educational, healthcare and other institutions in India. Later in the 19th century, a number of philosophers and Catholic Irish nationalists travelled to India, including the theosophist Annie Besant. It is widely believed that there existed a secret alliance between the Irish and Indian independence movements. Some Indian intellectuals like Jawaharlal Nehru and V. V. Giri were likely inspired by Irish nationalists when they studied in the United Kingdom. The city of Calcutta, India is credited with making the first larger donations in 1846 during great Irish famine, summing up to around £14,000. Indian Immigrants who have emigrated to Ireland in the recent years might have had their children born and raised here.

Several Irish regiments served in India during the British Raj. Here are some of the notable ones:

- Connaught Rangers: This regiment was one of the most well-known Irish regiments that served in India. They were involved in significant events, including the mutiny in Jalandhar in 1920, where members of the 1st Battalion Connaught Rangers protested against British rule in Ireland.
- Royal Irish Fusiliers: This regiment also had a presence in India and was involved in various military actions. Some members of the Connaught Rangers were temporarily seconded to the Royal Irish Fusiliers during the Easter Rising in 1916.
- Royal Dublin Fusiliers: Similar to the Royal Irish Fusiliers, the Royal Dublin Fusiliers also had Irish soldiers who were involved in various activities in India, including the defense against the Easter Rising.
- 88th Regiment of Foot (Connaught Rangers): This regiment was raised in Connaught and served in various capacities, including in India. It was amalgamated with the 94th Regiment of Foot to form the Connaught Rangers in 1881 as part of the Childers Reforms.
- 4th Royal Irish Dragoon Guards: This regiment was one of the main Irish regiments involved in the Napoleonic Wars and had a presence in India.
- 18th Royal Hussars: Another regiment involved in the Napoleonic Wars with a presence in India.
- 27th Regiment of Foot: This regiment was also involved in the Napoleonic Wars and had a presence in India.
- 87th Regiment of Foot: This regiment was involved in the Napoleonic Wars and had a presence in India.

These regiments played crucial roles in the British Indian Army, participating in various military actions and contributing to the administration and defense of British India.

== Culture ==
One of the cultural activities that Indians of Irish descent (who are aware of their Irish ancestry) participate in is Saint Patrick's Day.

== Notable people ==
- James Cousins – writer
- Margaret Cousins – educationist, suffragist and Theosophist
- S. M. Cyril – internationally recognized educational innovator
- Arthur E. Kennelly – electrical engineer
- Spike Milligan – comedian, writer, poet, playwright and actor
- Cyrus Pallonji Mistry – former chairman of Tata Group
- Sister Nivedita – disciple of Swami Vivekananda
- Derek O'Brien – Member of Parliament, Rajya Sabha, author and quiz show host
- Leo Varadkar – former Taoiseach of Ireland
- Gavin Packard – Bollywood and Mollywood villainous actor, 3rd Generation Irish American
- Amala Akkineni – actress

=== Company and British India Officers of Irish and Anglo-Irish ancestry ===
- Barry Close – General, East India Company
- Michael Francis O'Dwyer – Lieutenant Governor of Punjab, India
- David Barry – jailer of Kalapani Cellular Jail, India
- Eyre Coote (East India Company officer)
- Robert Rollo Gillespie – Major-General
- William Nassau Lees – Major-General
- Robert Montgomery (colonial administrator)
- John Nicholson (East India Company officer)
- Michael O'Dwyer – Lieutenant Governor of the Punjab
- Joseph O'Halloran – Major-General, East India Company
- William Olpherts – General, Indian army
- Eldred Pottinger – Major, East India Company
- Henry Pottinger – Lieutenant General, East India Company
- Abraham Roberts – General
- John Joseph Murphy – rubber planter, Yendayar, Kerala, India
- Richard Hieram Sankey – Lieutenant General
- Charles Stuart (East India Company officer)
- Ephraim Gerrish Stannus – Major-General, East India Company
- James Travers – General, East India Company
- Hugh Wheeler (East India Company officer)
- Frederick Young (East India Company officer)
- Arthur Wellesley, 1st Duke of Wellington – Major-General, East India Company
- Richard Wellesley, 1st Marquess Wellesley – Governor-General of Bengal
- James Joseph Daly – member (mutineer) of Connaught Rangers, India

== See also ==
- India–Ireland relations
- South Asian people in Ireland
- Anglo-Indian
- Indian diaspora
- Kim (novel)
