= Indian Certificate of Secondary Education =

Private worldwide accepted education board

- Abbreviation: ICSE
- Formation: 1958
- Type: Private Board of Education
- Headquarters: New Delhi, India
- Region served: India
- Official language: English
- Parent organization: Council for the Indian School Certificate Examinations (CISCE)
- Website: https://www.cisce.org/

The Indian Certificate of Secondary Education (ICSE) is an academic qualification awarded by the Council for the Indian School Certificate Examinations, a private, non-governmental board of education in India. The CISCE conducts these examinations to assess students' performance in a course of general education, offered through the medium of English, and aligned with the recommendations of the New Education Policy 2020. The board facilitates these examinations for affiliated schools across various states and union territories, ensuring standardized evaluation and representation.

== Overview ==
=== Introduction ===
The ICSE is known for its comprehensive syllabus and primary focus on the English language and variety of subjects that it offers, which involve language, arts, commerce and science. The ICSE is taught in English only.

The ICSE Examination is a school examination and the standard of the examination pre-supposes a school course of ten years duration (Classes I-X).

The Indian Certificate of Secondary Education Examination will ensure a general education and all candidates are required to enter for six or more subjects and Socially Useful Productive Work (SUPW).

Private candidates are not permitted to appear for the examination.

=== Academic Year ===
The beginning of the academic year in Schools affiliated to the Council for the Indian School Certificate Examinations (CISCE) shall be from the middle of March and the first week of June each year.

=== Entry Requirements ===
1. Entry to the Indian Certificate of Secondary Education Examination, in the case of candidates who are being entered for the first time, is restricted to candidates with a minimum of 75% attendance. Candidates can be entered only by the School they are attending.
2. Candidates who were entered as School candidates, in accordance with (1) above, and who were not awarded Pass Certificates may be admitted to Class X by 31 August, under intimation to CISCE, provided such a candidate fulfills all other conditions as per the Regulations.
3. Candidates who have been awarded Pass Certificates will be permitted to enter for a Supplementary Pass Certificate in any/all of the subjects offered.
4. Candidates who were not awarded Pass Certificates may appear for the Improvement Examination in subject/s (maximum two subjects) in which they have not secured the Pass Marks (33%)
5. There is no age limit for candidates taking the examination.

== Subjects ==
Fixed number of subjects are selected by schools. Candidates appearing for the ICSE must write examinations in at least six or at most eight subjects. Of these, five subjects will be included in their final grade—out of these five, one will compulsorily be English, even if it is the subject in which the student has scored the lowest marks. There are three groups of subjects.

=== Group I (compulsory) ===
- English
- Second Language (Any 1)
  - Hindi
    Indian regional languages
    - Assamese
    - Bengali
    - Dzongkha
    - Garo
    - Gujarati
    - Kannada
    - Khasi
    - Lepcha
    - Mizo
    - Malayalam
    - Marathi
    - Nepali
    - Odia
    - Punjabi
    - Sanskrit
    - Tamil
    - Tangkhul
    - Telugu
    - Urdu
    Modern foreign languages
    - Arabic
    - Chinese
    - French
    - German
    - Russian
    - Modern Armenian
    - Portuguese
    - Spanish
    - Thai
    - Tibetan
- Geography
- History & Civics
- History & Civics - Thailand (Note: Candidates offering History, Civics and Geography (Thailand) are not eligible to offer History, Civics and Geography.)
- Geography - Thailand

=== Group II (Any 2) ===
- Mathematics
- Science (Includes Physics, Chemistry and Biology)
- Economics
- Commercial Studies
- Environmental science
- Modern foreign languages (Group II): (Note: Candidates opting for a Modern Foreign Language as a Group II subject may not opt for the same language under Modern Foreign Languages as a Group I and Group III subject.)
  - French
  - German
  - Spanish
- Classical Language (Note: Candidates offering Sanskrit as a Group II subject may not opt for Sanskrit as a Group I subject.)

=== Group III (Any 1) ===
Section A (Note: Candidates may select one subject either from Section A or Section B or two subjects, one from Section A and one from Section B)

- Computer Applications
- Economic Applications (Note: Candidates offering Economic Applications in (Group III) are not eligible to offer Economics (Group II).)
- Commercial Applications (Note: Candidates offering Commercial Applications (Group III) are not eligible to offer Commercial Studies (Group II).)
- Art
- Performing Arts
- Home Science
- Cookery
- Fashion Designing
- Physical Education
- Yoga
- Technical Drawing Applications
- Environmental Applications (Note: Candidates offering Environmental Applications (Group III) are not eligible to offer Environmental Science (Group II).)
- Modern Foreign Languages (Group III): (Note: Candidates opting for a Modern Foreign Language as a Group III subject may not opt for the same language under Modern Foreign Languages as a Group I and Group II subject)
  - French
  - German
  - Spanish
- Mass Media & Communication
- Hospitality Management

Section B

- Robotics and Artificial Intelligence
- Assistant Beauty Therapist
- Assistant Hair Stylist
- Basic Data Entry Operator
- Dietetic Aide
- Cashier
- Early Years Physical Activity Facilitator
- Auto Service Technician

While ICSE offers each of these subjects to students, the school affiliated to CISCE may or may not be offering all the subjects listed. Depending on the school's resources, only a few subjects may be available to students.

In addition to the subjects listed above ICSE mandates an extra-curricular development to be displayed by students. This is achieved through a scheme called Socially Useful Productive Work & Community Service, commonly referred to as SUPW, introduced in 1978.

In accordance to SUPW, candidates will be required to select one main craft and one subsidiary service or one main service and one subsidiary craft per year of preparation for the examination. The craft may be aligned with their studies. For example a candidate who has selected Art may submit pottery as their craft.

ICSE added 8 vocational subjects under Section B of Group III in 2025.

=== Marking Scheme ===
Group I and Group II subjects have a separate marking scheme than that of Group III subjects, though all exams are scored out of 100.

In Group I and Group II subjects, candidates write an 80 mark paper on the day of the examination which constitutes the external examination portion of their marks. Another 20 marks constitute the internal assessment, which is awarded based on projects, practical files or oral/aural assessments.

To obtain marks out of 100, both external examination and internal assessment is added and reported as final marks.

Thus the split between external and internal assessments is 80% and 20% respectively.

For Group III subjects and Artificial intelligence and Robotics, candidates write a 100 mark paper on the day of the examination, which comprises the external examination portion of their marks. Another 100 marks comprise the internal assessment which is awarded based on projects or practical files.

To obtain marks out of 100, both external examination and internal assessment marks are added and the average is calculated and reported as final marks.

This the split between external and internal assessments is 50%.

The pass marks for each subject is 33%.

The maximum attainable marks is a 600 out of 600 or 100% which is an All India Rank of 1.

== Examinations ==
The Indian Certificate of Secondary Education Examination is conducted once a year, and usually spans 1 month. The registrations for supplementary examination and improvement examination are opened within a month after declaration of results of the main exam.

In 2025, the ICSE examination took place from February 18 to March 27.

In the one-month interval of the exams, only one examination is conducted per day, often leaving gaps in between each exam, giving candidates a large gap between their exams.

Each exam normally spans 2 hours, with the exception of the following exams which have a duration of 3 hours:

- Second language and other language exams
- Mathematics
- Art papers

Each exam usually has only one paper, with the exception of the following papers:

- English - 2 papers (English Literature and English Language)
- Science - 3 papers (Physics, Chemistry, Biology)
- Humanities - 2 papers (Geography, History & Civics)

=== Improvement Examination ===
All candidates who appear for the ICSE Main Examination, are eligible to take the Improvement Examination conducted on the same year of Examination.

Candidates are allowed to take the improvement examination for any two subjects they have enrolled themselves in.

== Certification ==
The Indian Certificate of Secondary Education will be awarded to every candidate that sits for a minimum of 6 subjects and SUPW, attaining an aggregate of their 5 best subjects (including English) of above 33% and a grade of D or above in their SUPW.

== Criticism ==
In 2013, a 20-year-old Indian student studying in the US, Debarghya Das, claimed in his personal blog to have downloaded the ICSE scores for over 100,000 students by scraping. His analysis of the data showed interesting patterns in the marking system, suggesting that the marks were rounded off with no student getting under 33 marks out of a possible 100. The reason for this was reportedly attributed to moderation; a practice also followed by Central Board of Secondary Education (CBSE), it involved tweaking candidates' marks to account for paper variances.

ICSE board claims of getting admission to foreign universities are misleading as additional tests like TOEFL or IELTS score are used for admission in foreign universities.

Some critics argue that ICSE/ISC is not suitable for Indian entrance exam as it is not oriented towards Science & problem solving, its syllabus is more aligned towards humanities and admission into Central universities such as Delhi University.

In West Bengal, Several toppers claimed to have benefitted by migrating from boards like the ICSE to CBSE for plus II.

In Kerala, close to 47% of Plus II students had migrated to the state board & CBSE from the ICSE. Similar pattern is commonly observed in other states.

== See also ==
- Council of Indian School Certificate Examinations (The examination board responsible for conducting the ICSE and ISC examinations)
- Indian School Certificate (The examination conducted at the senior secondary level (Grade 12 equivalent) under the same board)
- Central Board of Secondary Education (A central government-run board that administers nationwide examinations at the secondary and senior secondary levels)
