= Christianity in Chhattisgarh =

Christianity is a minority religion in Chhattisgarh, a state of India. Chhattisgarh is within the area of the Church of North India. The Roman Catholic Archdiocese of Raipur has its seat in the province. The suffragan dioceses with seat in Chhattisgarh are the Syro-Malabar Catholic Diocese of Jagdalpur, the Roman Catholic Diocese of Ambikapur, the Roman Catholic Diocese of Jashpur and the Roman Catholic Diocese of Raigarh. Jyotipur has several Protestant churches. Chhattisgarh is part of the newly formed Syro-Malankara Catholic Diocese of Gurgaon. Janjgir Mennonite Church was founded in the early 20th century. Dhamtari is the seat of the headquarters of the Mennonite Church in India and of Mennonite Higher Secondary Schools. Champa Christian Hospital was started by the Mennonite Mission USA in 1926. Believers Church of India is active in Chhattisgarh. Bilaspur has a Disciples of Christ Church. Jagdalpur has a Christ College. Many people in the state are Adivasi. Chhattisgarh has anti-conversion legislation. In recent years, Christians have increasingly become targets of violence from Hindutva groups.

Christians in Chhattisgarh
Year	Number	Percentage
2001	401,035	1.92
2011	490,542	1.92

== List of denominations ==
- Assemblies of God
- Bharatiya General Conference Mennonite Church
- Christian Community Church, Bhilai Nagar
- Mennonite Church in India
- Board of Christian Community Church
- Church Of Christ Schaefer Mission In India Bilaspur
- Indian Pentecostal Church of God
