= Diocese of Hazaribag =

Roman Catholic diocese in Jharkhand, India

Coordinates: 23.9946°N 85.3697°E

Diocese of Hazaribag Dioecesis Hazaribaganus

Location
- Country: India
- Ecclesiastical province: Ranchi
- Metropolitan: Ranchi

Statistics
- Area: 21,213 km^{2} (8,190 sq mi)
- Population: Total; Catholics: (as of 2006); 5,067,000; 35,252 (0.7%)

Information
- Rite: Roman Rite
- Cathedral: Cathedral of the Resurrection in Hazaribagh

Current leadership
- Pope: Leo XIV
- Bishop: Anand Jojo
- Metropolitan Archbishop: Telesphore Toppo

The Roman Catholic Diocese of Hazaribag (Latin: Hazaribagan(us)) is a diocese located in the city of Hazaribag in the ecclesiastical province of Ranchi in India.

== History ==
- April 1, 1995: Established as Diocese of Hazaribag from the Diocese of Daltonganj

== Leadership ==
- Bishops of Hazaribag (Latin Church)
  - Bishop Charles Soreng, S.J. (April 1, 1995 – September 8, 2012)
  - Bishop Jojo Anand (Appointed September 8, 2012 – present)
