= Diocese of Gumla =

Roman catholic diocese in Jharkhand, India

Coordinates: 23.0466°N 84.5564°E

Diocese of Gumla Dioecesis Gumlaensis गुमला के सूबा
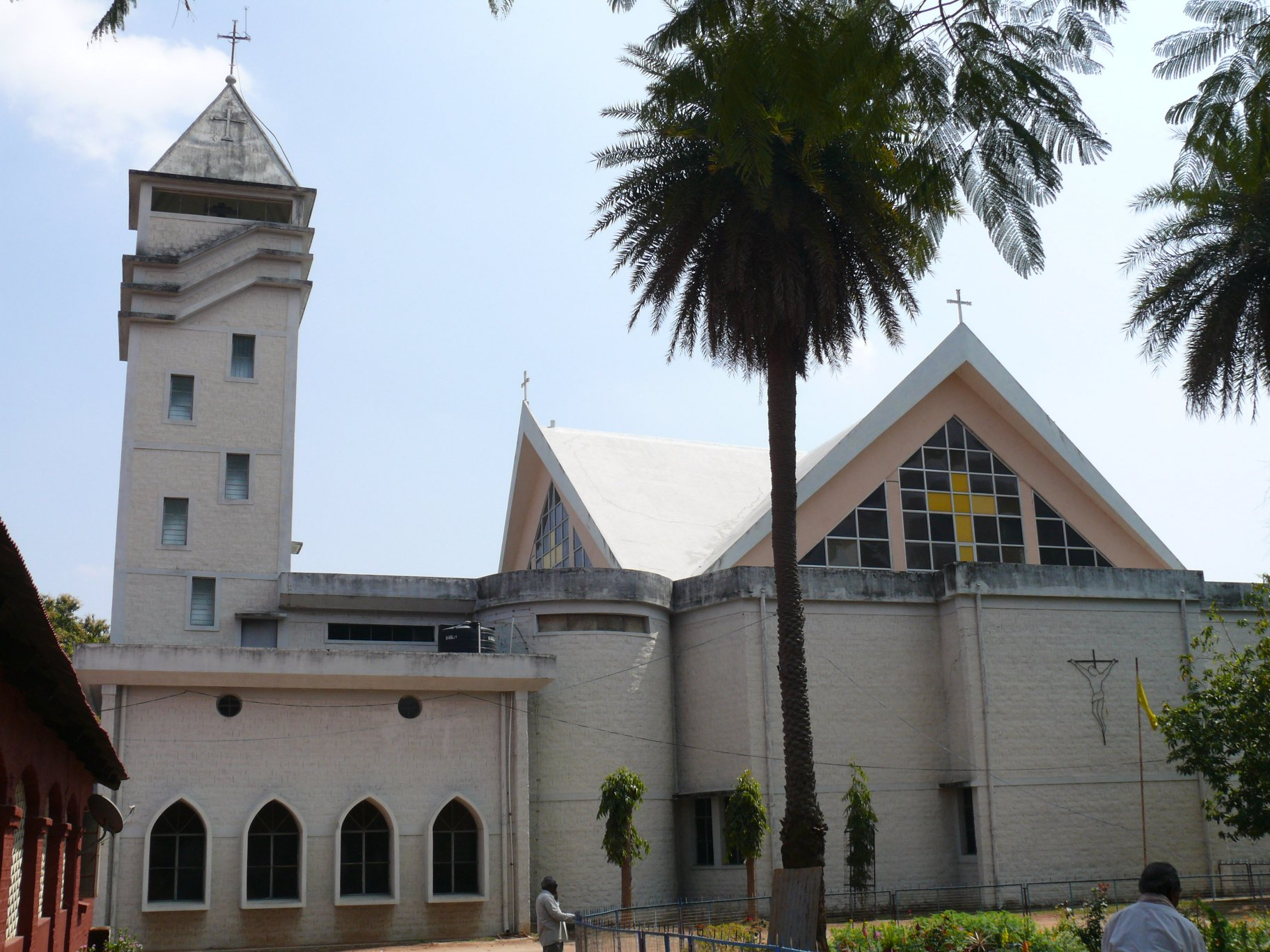

Location
- Country: India
- Ecclesiastical province: Ranchi
- Metropolitan: Ranchi

Statistics
- Area: 5,316 km^{2} (2,053 sq mi)
- Population: Total; Catholics: (as of 2023); 1,299,000; 195,000 (15.0%)
- Parishes: 38

Information
- Rite: Latin Rite
- Established: 28 May 1993
- Cathedral: Cathedral of St Patrick in Gumla

Current leadership
- Pope: Leo XIV
- Bishop: Linus Pingal Ekka
- Metropolitan Archbishop: Vincent Aind

The Roman Catholic Diocese of Gumla (Latin: Gumlaën(sis)) is a diocese located in the city of Gumla in the ecclesiastical province of Ranchi in India.

== History ==
- May 28, 1993: Established as Diocese of Gumla from the Metropolitan Archdiocese of Ranchi

== Leadership ==
- Bishops of Gumla (Latin Rite)
  - Bishop Michael Minj, S.J. (28 May 1993 – 15 November 2004)
  - Bishop Paul Alois Lakra (28 January 2006 – 15 June 2021)
