= Oscar Sevrin =

Belgian Jesuit priest, missionary and bishop

Oscar Sevrin S.J.
- Bishop of Raigarh–Ambikapur
- Church: Catholic Church
- Diocese: Diocese of Raigarh–Ambikapur
- In office: 13 December 1951 – 8 November 1957
- Predecessor: Diocese erected
- Successor: Stanislaus Tigga
- Other post: Titular Bishop of Mossyna (1957-1975)
- Previous post: Bishop of Ranchi (1934-1951)

Orders
- Ordination: 1 July 1919
- Consecration: 25 July 1934 by Ferdinand Perier

Personal details
- Born: 22 November 1884 Neuville-Wanne, Liège Province, Belgium
- Died: 30 April 1975 (aged 90) Kunkuri, Madhya Pradesh, India

Oscar Sevrin (22 November 1884 in Neuville-Wanne – 30 April 1975 in Kunkuri) was a Belgian Jesuit priest, missionary in India and successively bishop of Ranchi and Raigarh-Ambikapur.

== Religious formation and early years in India ==
Born in Neuville-Wanne, in the Ardennes on 22 November 1884, Sevrin joined the Society of Jesus in 1903 and did his novitiate in Arlon. After doing his philosophical studies at the Jesuit Philosophate of Louvain (1906–08) he left for India with a group of other young Jesuit missionaries. At that time, the Bengal state (covering the entire Eastern part of British India) was a mission area entrusted to the Belgian Jesuits. While teaching in the schools of Rengarih and Ranchi (1911–16), both important centres in the (now) Jharkhand state, Sevrin had his first contacts with the aboriginal population of the Chota Nagpur Plateau. He then completed his Jesuit formation by doing theological studies in Kurseong where he was ordained priest on 1 July 1919.

== Bishop of Ranchi ==
Sevrin embarked on an educational career, first as a teacher in the St. John's High School in Ranchi (1921–31) and later as inspector of the Catholic missions schools in the whole area (1923–24) when, to everybody's surprise, he was appointed bishop of Ranchi (9 April 1934). The diocese had been created in 1927 and Sevrin was its second bishop. Education remained a priority and he did much to develop an educational network for the Mundas, Oraons and Kharias in the vast area covered by the diocese. He promoted also the local press by creating the Hindi language magazine called Nishkalanka and composed a little catechism and other booklets (among them the Bible ka Itihas) in order to build up a faith culture among the many new Christians of his diocese.

== Bishop of Raigarh-Ambikapur ==
In 1951 Sevrin, at the age of 67, asked Pope Pius XII for permission to be relieved from his responsibility in Ranchi. He was giving two reasons: there was a local Oraon priest, Nicolas Kujur, who, Sevrin felt, was quite capable of taking his place as the pastor of the diocese, and, second, he wanted to go to a neighbouring state where conditions of missionary work – because of great hostility towards Christianity – were extremely difficult. His new diocese, Raigarh-Ambikapur, was formed of several little princely states where, as long as they were autonomous (till the independence of India in 1947), the presence of Christian missionaries was strictly prohibited. Illiteracy and the exploitation of the tribal people were rife. Sevrin, the new bishop, settled down in a small parish and started his work: education, medical help, economic and social development were going hand in hand with evangelization. Success got him many enemies and he had to face a number of malefide court cases. On the other hand, he acquired great prestige among the aboriginal population of the area, including non-Christians.

In 1957, for the second time, he decided to resign to allow a local man to be the religious leader of his own people. Sevrin ordained his own successor at Raigarh-Ambikapur: Stanislas Tigga. This did not mean retirement, however. Appointed spiritual guide and professor of religion in the high school of Kunkuri he remained active till his death at the age of 91 on 30 April 1975 in Kunkuri, Chhattisgarh, India.

== Bibliography ==
- THOMAS, A.P.: Bishop Sevrin, Great Benefactor of the Tribals, Allahabad (India), 1963.
- MATHIJS, F.: A Good Shepherd, in Jesuit profiles, Anand, 1991, pp. 361–364.
