= Diocese of Daltonganj =

Roman catholic diocese in Jharkhand, India

Coordinates: 24.0367°N 84.0742°E

Diocese of Daltonganj Dioecesis Daltonganiensis

Location
- Country: India
- Ecclesiastical province: Ranchi
- Metropolitan: Ranchi

Statistics
- Area: 2,750 km^{2} (1,060 sq mi)
- Population: Total; Catholics: (as of 2022); 3,358,000; 69,200 (2.1%)
- Parishes: 23

Information
- Rite: Latin Rite
- Established: 5 June 1971
- Cathedral: Shanti ki Maharani church, Medininagar
- Patron saint: Shanti Ki Maharani
- Secular priests: 43

Current leadership
- Pope: Leo XIV
- Bishop: Theodore Mascarenhas
- Metropolitan Archbishop: Vincent Aind
- Bishops emeritus: Gabriel Kujur

The Roman Catholic Diocese of Daltonganj (Latin: Daltonganien(sis)) is a diocese located in the city of Daltonganj in the ecclesiastical province of Ranchi in India.

== History ==
- 5 June 1971: Established as Diocese of Daltonganj from the Metropolitan Archdiocese of Ranchi

== Leadership ==
- Bishops of Daltonganj (Latin Rite)
  - Bishop Theodore Mascarenhas SFX (January 2024)
  - Bishop Gabriel Kujur, S.J. (3 March 1997 – 7 July 2016)
  - Bishop Charles Soreng, S.J. (23 October 1989 – 1 April 1995)
  - Bishop George Victor Saupin, S.J. (5 June 1971 – 30 November 1987)
