= St. Joseph the Worker Cathedral, Raiganj =

St. Joseph the Worker Cathedral
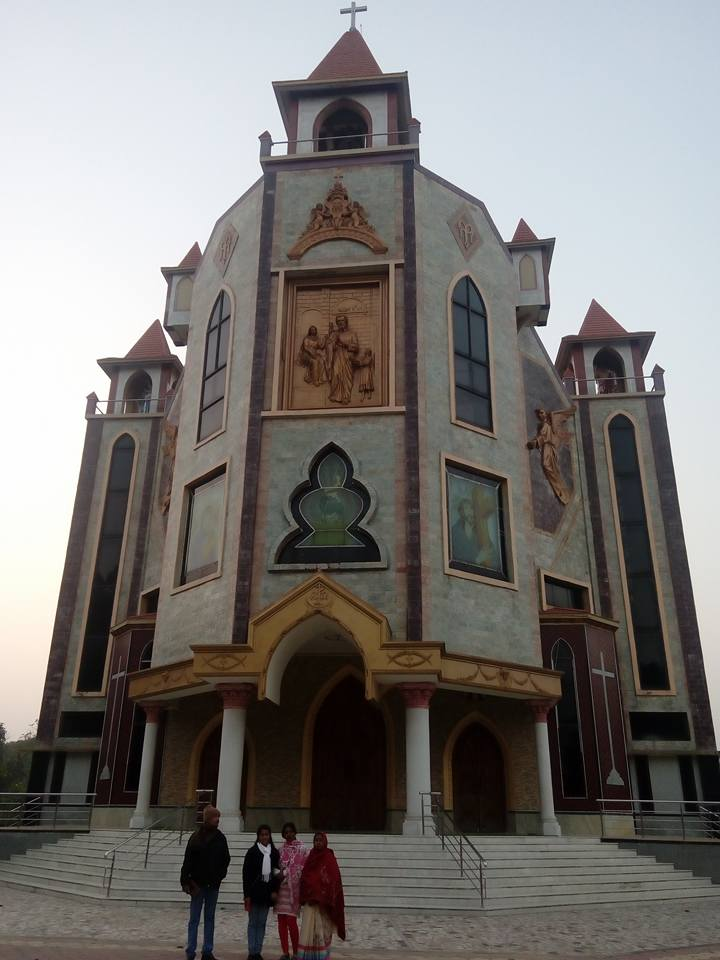
- Raiganj Church
- Location: Raiganj, Uttar Dinajpur
- Country: India
- Denomination: Catholic Church (Roman rite)

Architecture
- Heritage designation: Protected Monument ASI
- Architect: Arvinda Chatterjee
- Years built: 2010
- Completed: 17 November 2010

Specifications
- Capacity: 2000
- Height: 90 ft (27 m)

Administration
- Diocese: Roman Catholic Diocese of Raiganj

Clergy
- Bishop: Dr. Alphonsus D'Souza S.J.

St. Joseph the Worker Cathedral is a cathedral dedicated to the patron saint of Raiganj in West Bengal, India. The cathedral features glass and ceiling paintings, prominent pillars on both sides modeled on Greek pillars, carved doors and a high altar with a hexagonal dome on top of it. It is located at Misonmore in Chhota parua Village which is 5 kilometers from the city limits.

== History ==
This cathedral that took three years and ten months to complete was dedicated by Bishop Alphonsus D'Souza S.J. on 17 November 2010. In 1962, Fr. Albinus Kujur began a mission center at Chotaparua in a small tin house which had a chapel, living room and a refectory. When the Diocese of Raiganj was erected in 1978 the first Bishop Leo Tigga S.J. stayed in the same house till the present Bishop's House was constructed. Realizing the need to have a larger parish church, Fr. Verghese Kozhikadan began the construction of the parish church in 1972 which was completed in 1974. This tin roofed church subsequently became the cathedral of the Raiganj Diocese when the diocese was created in 1978. The same church continued to serve as the cathedral of the diocese when Dr. Alphonsus D'Souza S.J. was appointed as the Bishop of Raiganj.

The old tin roofed cathedral had been leaking during the rainy seasons and the space being inadequate to hold the increasing catholic population. There had been a proposal since 2002 to replace the cathedral. However, being concerned with the spiritual and material wellbeing of the people, Bishop Alphonsus resisted spending huge amounts of money that was required for the construction of a new cathedral. It was in 2004, while accompanying Bishop Alphonsus from the Malda railway station on his way back from a visit to his native village in Moodubelle, the treasurer of the diocese and secretary to the Bishop, Fr. Sunny M.V. once again put forward the suggestion for a new building for the cathedral. The Bishop thought for a while and said that the proposal can be considered.

== Construction ==
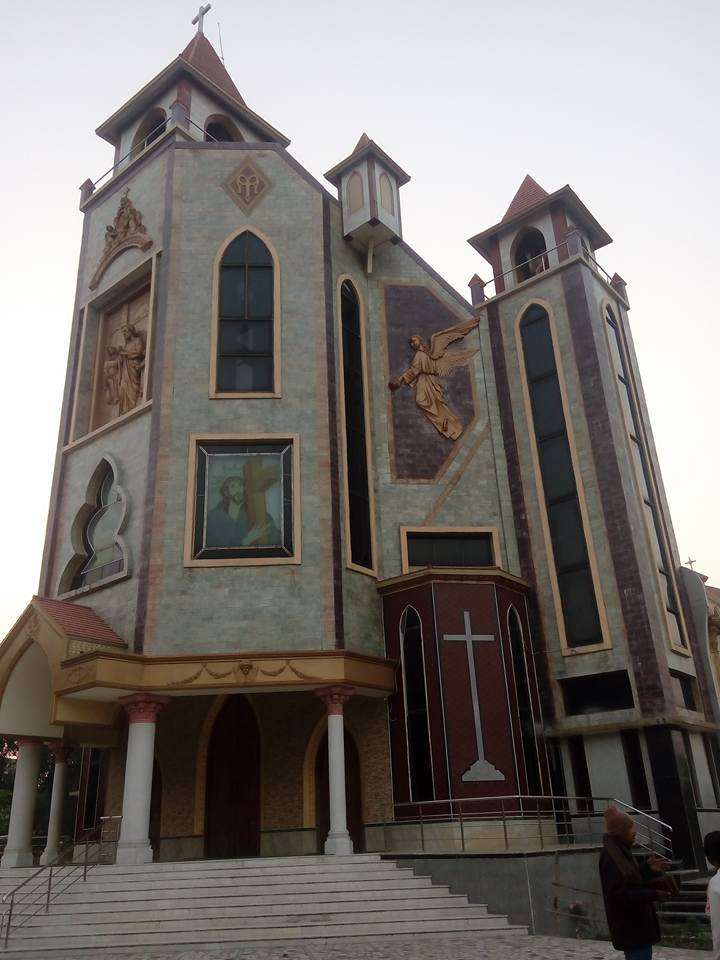
View of Raiganj Church

Having given his consent to have a new cathedral, Bishop Alphonsus constituted a committee with Fr. Sunny as the convener and Vicar Generals-Fr. S. Santhappan and Fr. Patras Bara, Fr. Michael Raj and the then Pro-Vicar, Fr. Kishore Baxla as members to plan and execute the construction of the cathedral in 2005. It took nearly one year to get the necessary permission from the government authorities and another year to finalize the plan of the cathedral. Having assigned the task of preparing a plan for the cathedral, Fr. Sunny wanted to see some of the famous churches and cathedrals in different parts of India and went to various places such as Kerala, Chennai, Bangalore and Hyderabad. However, while observing various churches and cathedrals, Fr. Sunny had no intention of copying their architecture, but to get inspiration to produce a unique type of architecture without a parallel in the entire country. He accessed internet for various types of European architecture right from Gothic to Renaissance and from Roman to Greek and Baroque. Piecing together the examples that he had collected from his visits to various churches and cathedrals in India and from the internet, Fr. Sunny with the help of a local artist Gurupada Sarkar prepared a drawing and approached an architect in Kolkata, Arvinda Chatterjee who prepared the final structural plan.

== Inauguration ==
With the plan of the proposed new cathedral in hand, the foundation stone for the construction was laid behind the existing dilapidated old cathedral on 9 January 2007. The construction work went on for three years and ten months under the guidance of Bishop Alphonsus and active supervision of Fr. Sunny. Following the completion of the construction of the cathedral it was inaugurated, blessed and dedicated on 17 November 2010 by Bishop Alphonsus D'Souza S.J. in the presence of eight other Bishops including the Archbishop of Patna and Bishops of Purnea, Baruipur, Asansol, Krishnagar, Bagdogra, Jalpaiguri and Darjeeling. The dedication ceremony was attended by many Major Superiors, 600 priests and religious and about 30,000 faithful from all over West Bengal and nearby dioceses of Dumka and Purnea.
