= Linus Pingal Ekka =

Bishop of Roman Catholic Diocese of Gumla

The Most Reverend Linus Pingal Ekka
- Bishop of Gumla
- Church: Catholic Church
- Archdiocese: Ranchi Archdiocese
- Province: Ranchi Province
- Diocese: Diocese of Gumla
- Appointed: November 30, 2023
- Installed: January 12, 2024
- Predecessor: Paul Alois Lakra

Orders
- Ordination: 26 January 1994
- Consecration: 12 January, 2024 by Felix Toppo

Personal details
- Born: 23 September 1961 (age 64) Chainpur, Gumla, Jharkhand
- Denomination: Roman Catholic
- Motto: Ad vitam aeternam

Linus Pingal Ekka (born 23 September 1961) is an Indian prelate of the Catholic Church who has serves as the Bishop of Diocese of Gumla since 2023.

== Early life ==
Linus Pingal Ekka first earned a master's degree at St. Aloysius College in Jabalpur and then licentiate in philosophy and theology at the Pontificial Urban University. In January 1994 he received the sacrament of ordination for the diocese of Gumla.

After his ordination, he initially worked in parish pastoral care from 1995 to 1997 and again from 1999 to 2000 he was rector of the preparatory course in Karondabera. From 1995 to 1999 he studied again in Rome at the Urbaniana, where he received his doctorate in canon law. During his study he stay in Italy, he also worked as the pastor in Archdiocese of Udine. From 2000 to 2002 he was a visiting professor and the a full professor at St. Albert's Regional College in Ranchi until 2011 in director of the philosophy department. From 2011 to 2017 he was in the Archdiocese of Udine in Italy and worked as a parochial vicar in Ampezzo, precisely in the parish of Forni di Sopra. From 2017 to 2020 he was Chancellor of Diocese of Gumla and responsible for the church marriage process. From 2019 to 2020 he was an official of the diocese and judge at church court. As of 2021, he was the Diocesan administrator of the Gumla Diocese during the Sede Vacancy.

On 30 November 2023 Pope Francis appointed him Bishop of Gumla.

== See also ==
• List of Catholic Bishops of India
