= Joseph Minj =

Indian Roman Catholic bishop (1932–2018)

- Bishop of Simdega
- Church: Catholic Church
- Diocese: Diocese of Simdega
- In office: 28 May 1993 – 11 February 2008
- Predecessor: Diocese erected
- Successor: Vincent Barwa

Orders
- Ordination: 10 July 1960
- Consecration: 24 August 1993 by Telesphore Toppo

Personal details
- Born: 17 October 1932 Paikpara, Calcutta, Presidency of Fort William in Bengal, British Raj, British Empire
- Died: 16 August 2018 (aged 85) Simdega, Jharkhand, India

Joseph Minj (17 October 1932 – 16 August 2018) was an Indian Roman Catholic bishop.

Minj was born in India and was ordained to the priesthood in 1960. He served as the first bishop of the Roman Catholic Diocese of Simdega, India, from 1993 to 2008.
