= St. Mary's Cathedral, Ranchi =

St. Mary's Cathedral
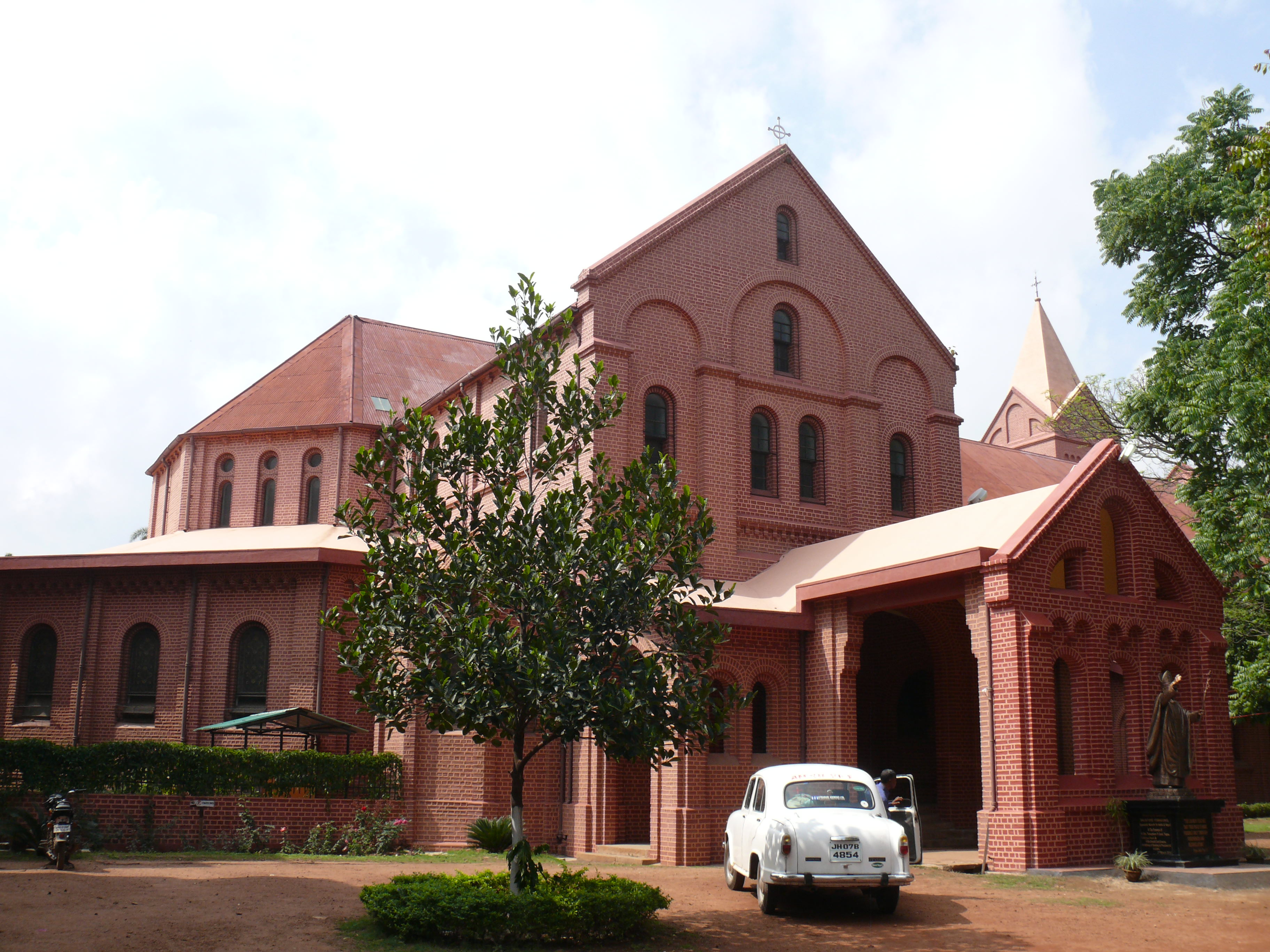
- St. Mary's Cathedral
- St. Mary's Cathedral
- 23.2879°N 75.6200°E
- Location: Ranchi
- Country: India
- Denomination: Roman Catholic

History
- Status: Cathedral
- Founded: 1847
- Founder: Fr. John Mc Donnel

Architecture
- Functional status: Active

Administration
- Province: Ranchi
- Diocese: Ranchi

Clergy
- Archbishop: Felix Toppo

St. Mary's Cathedral is one of the oldest church of the Ranchi, in the Chota Nagpur Plateau area. Catholics and Christian faithful working as tea gardens in Tea Estates area, Railway along with the farmers were the early community of the church.

== History ==
Christian Missionaries serving among the people made thatched sheds on the hillock near the market and Kallada River. One of the thatched sheds used as Church during 1866 was the first Church of Ranchi established by the Roman Catholic missionaries.

In May 1927 Diocese of Ranchi was established from Archdiocese of Calcutta with Ranchi its Episcopal seat and Msgr. Louis Van Hoeck, sj, as the first bishop and St. Mary's Cathedral became cathedral of newly found Diocese.Louis Van Hoeck, S.J., the first Bishop of Ranchi, formally took possession of the cathedral on 30 June 1928.The Church was named after(St. Mary) and liturgies of the Church were in Latin.

Archbishop Brice Meuleman laid the foundation stone of the cathedral on 20 May 1906. Construction took more than three years, and the cathedral was solemnly blessed and opened to the public on 3 October 1909 by Bishop Major Hurth of Dhaka. This cathedral was constructed by Jesuit Brother Alfred Lemoine on the model of Church at Arlon.

Catholics at St. Mary's Cathedral, Ranchi, celebrated the election in 2025 of Robert Cardinal Prevost as Pope Leo XIV.

== Location ==
St Mary's Cathedral complex is located on north of Ranchi railway on Dr caumil Bulke path (Purulia Road).

== Gallery ==
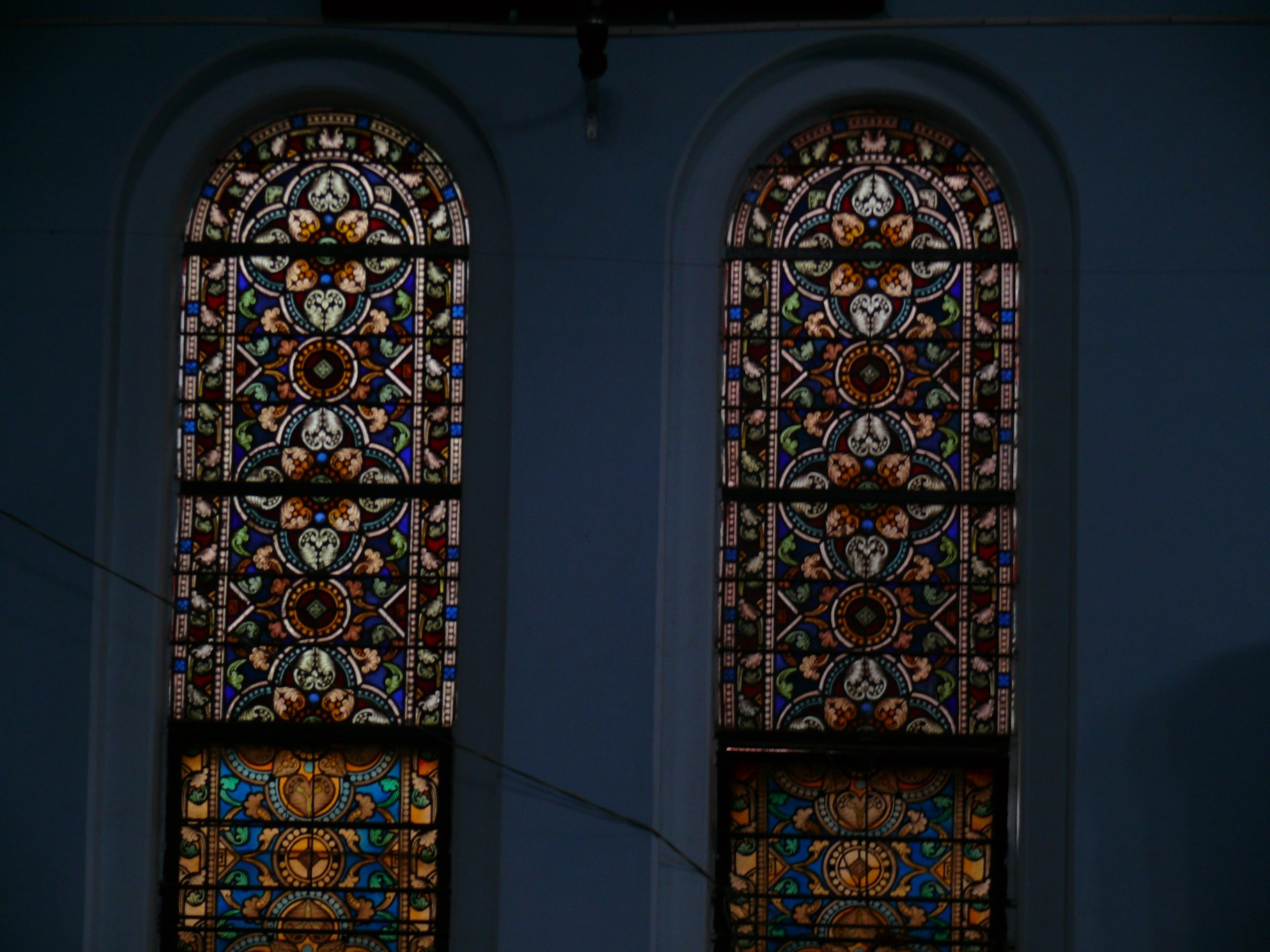
Stained Glass at St. Mary's Cathedral

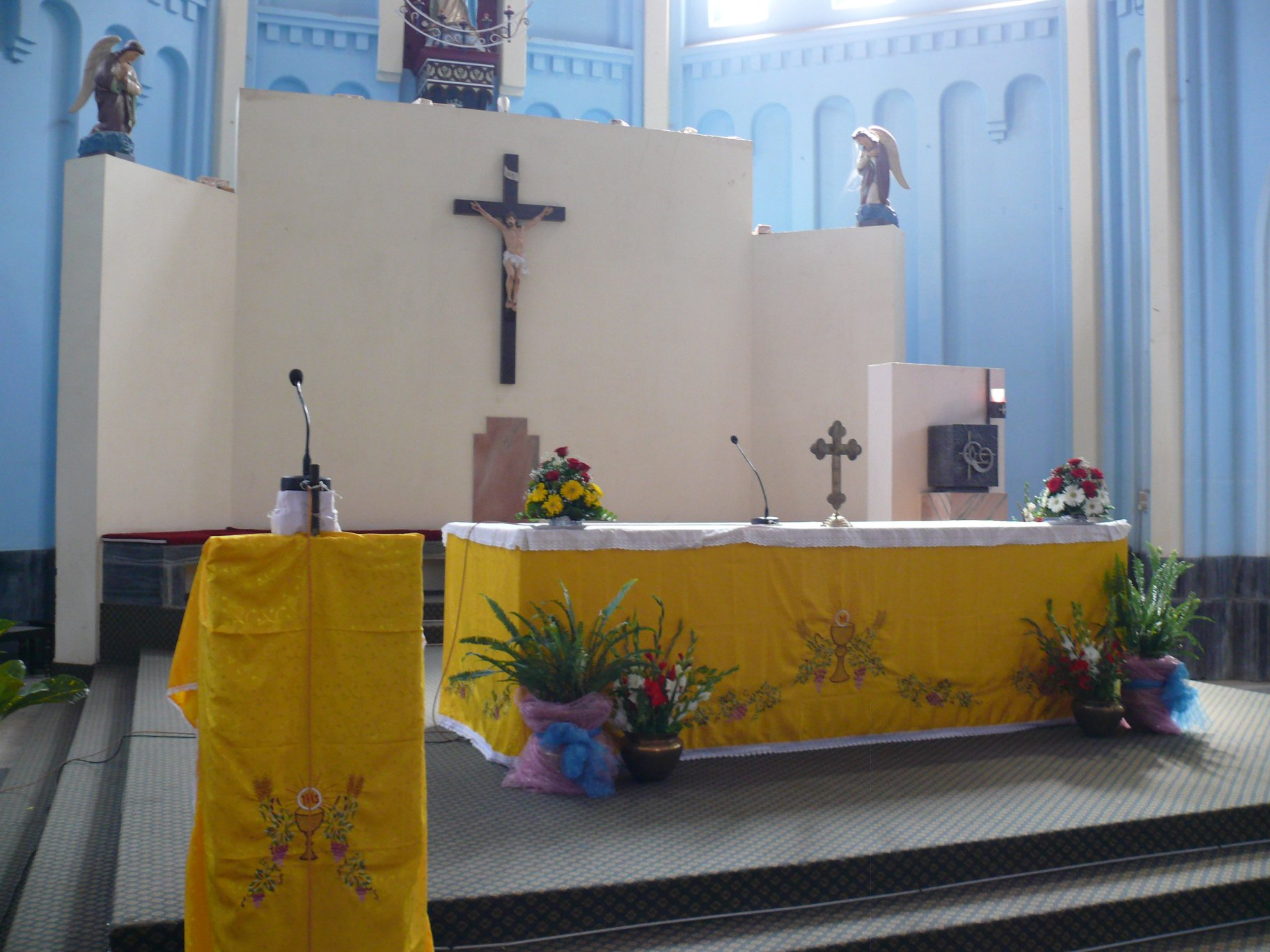
Interior of St. Mary's Cathedral

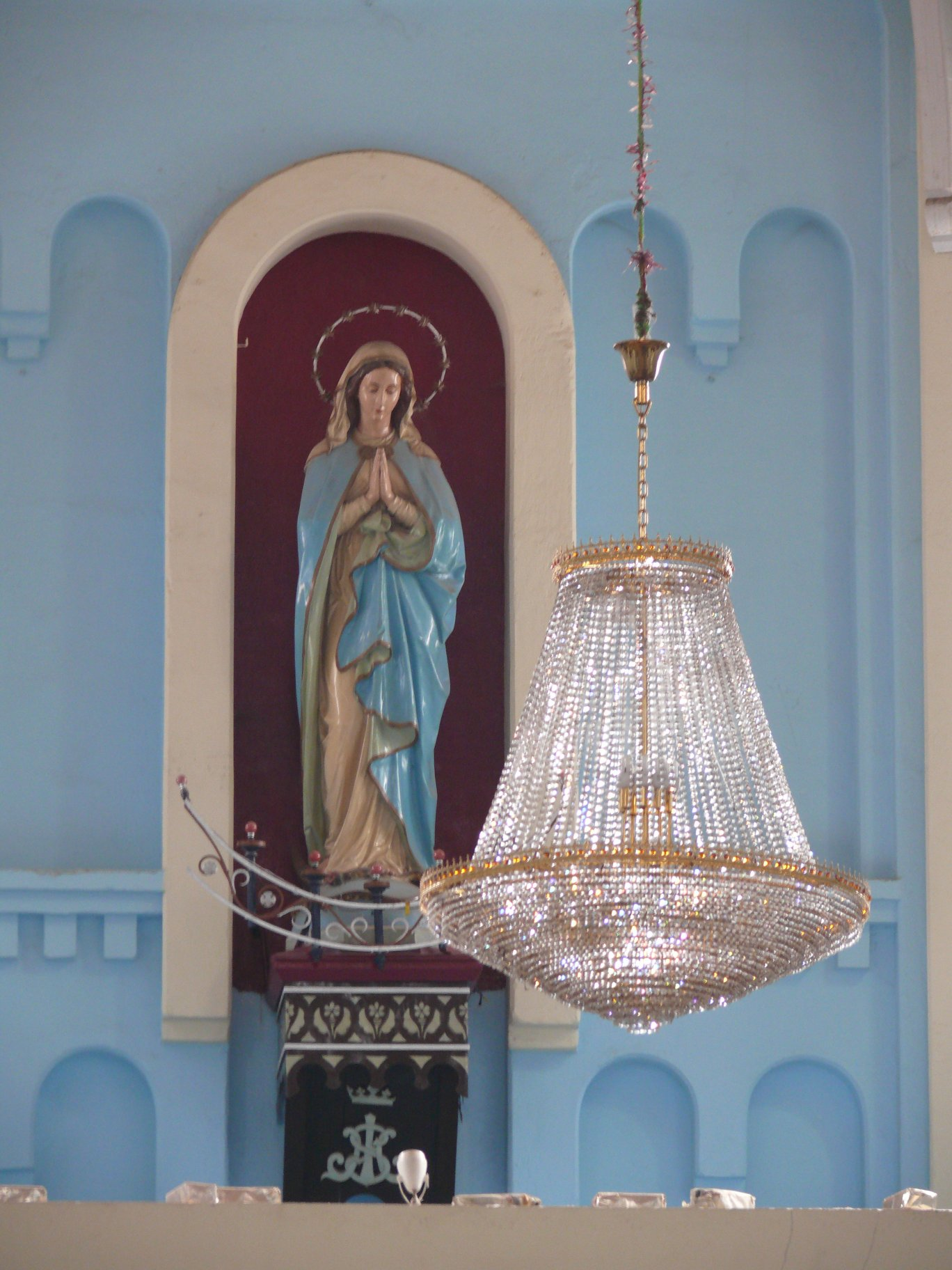
Statue of the Virgin Mary

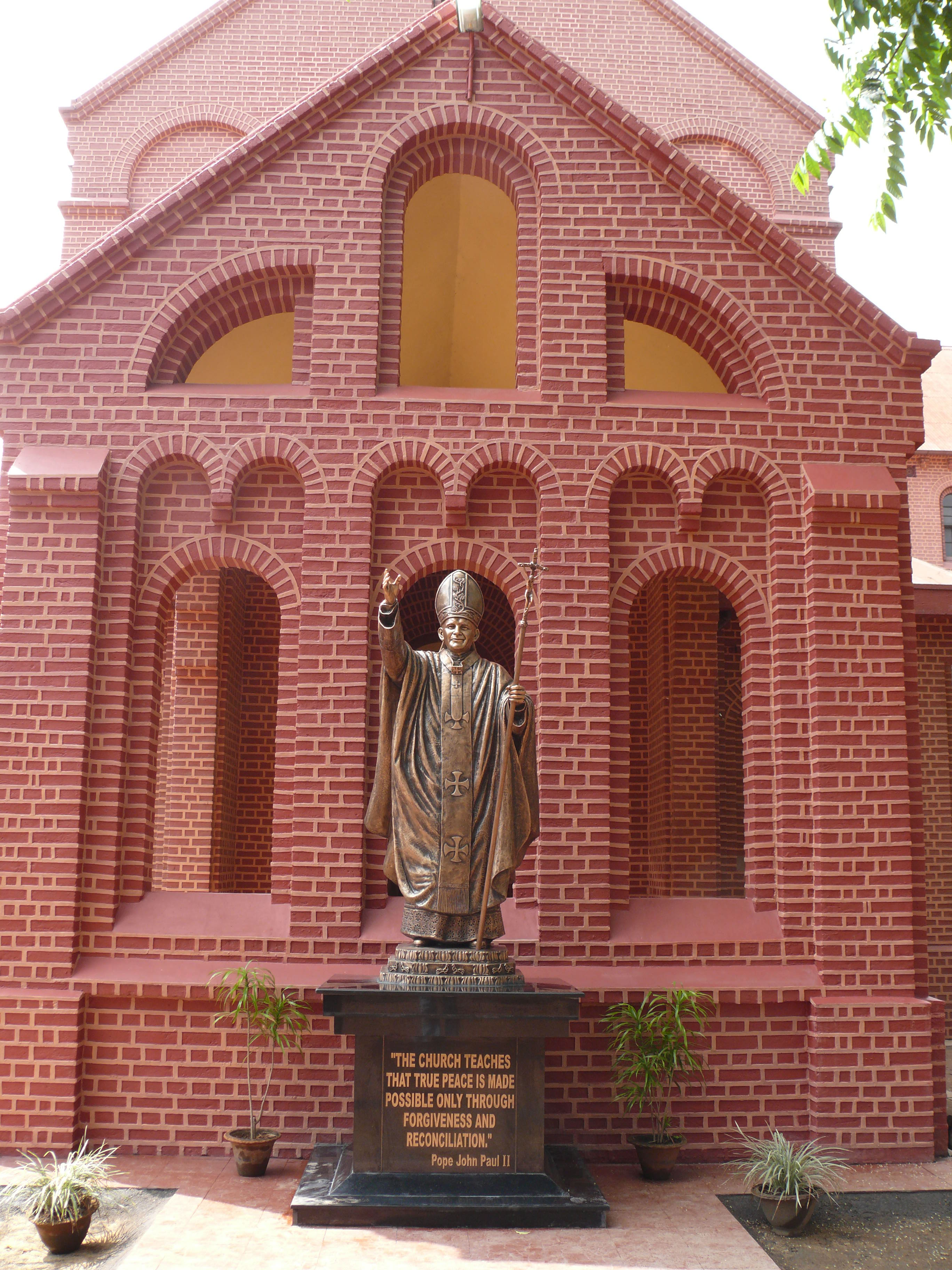
Outside view of Cathedral with Statue of Pope John Paul 2

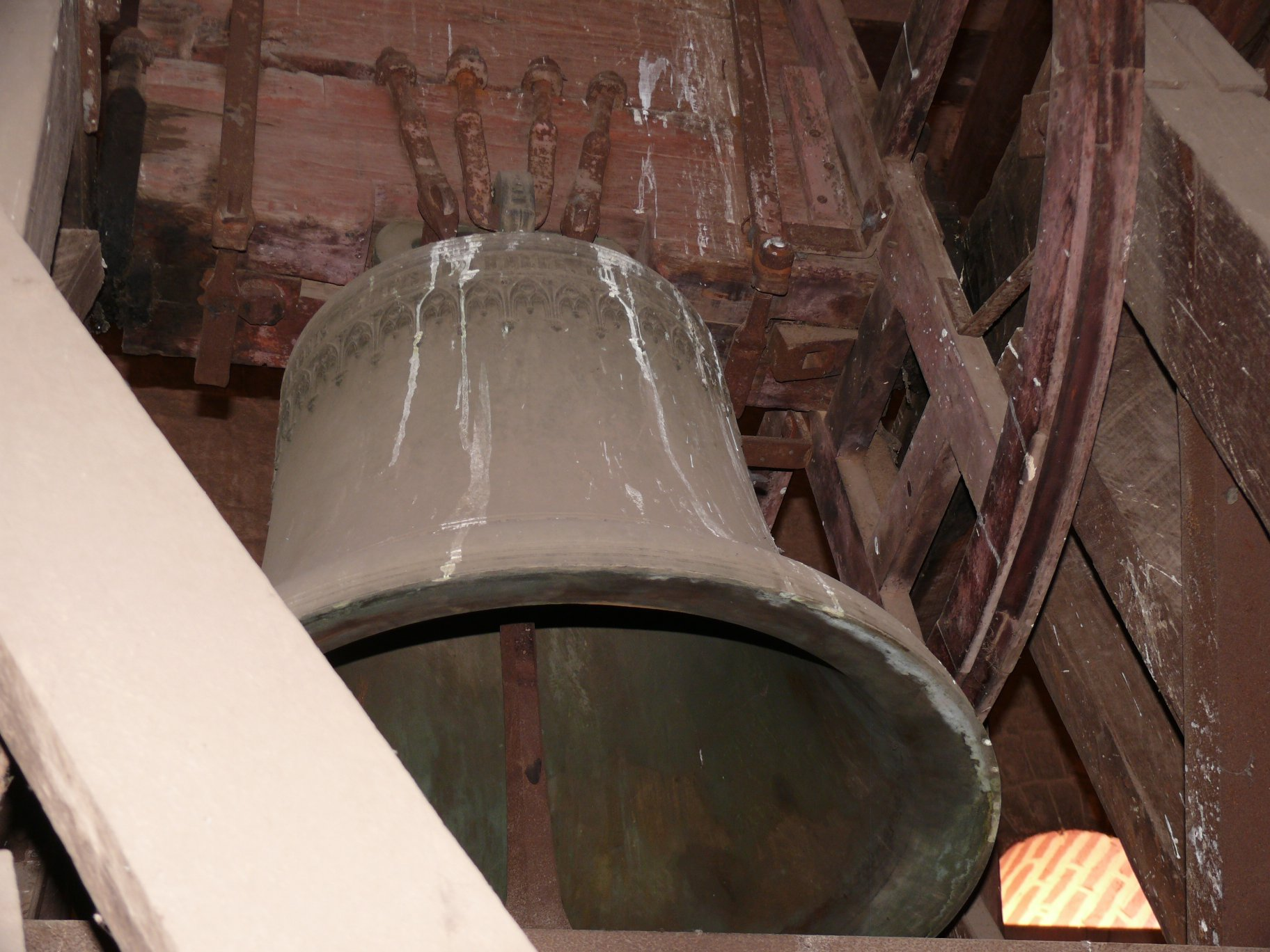
Bells in the cathedral belfry

== See also ==
- Roman Catholic Church
