= Diocese of Dumka =

Catholic diocese in Jharkhand & West Bengal, India

Coordinates: 24.2818°N 87.2378°E

Diocese of Dumka Dioecesis Dumkaënsis दुमका के सूबा ᱫᱩᱢᱠᱟᱹ ᱨᱮᱭᱟᱜ ᱰᱟᱭᱳᱥᱤᱥ

Location
- Country: India
- Ecclesiastical province: Ranchi

Statistics
- Area: 14,356 km^{2} (5,543 sq mi)
- Population: Total; Catholics: (as of 2022); 4,542,658; 207,336 (4.6%)
- Parishes: 73

Information
- Denomination: Catholic Church
- Sui iuris church: Latin Church
- Rite: Roman Rite
- Cathedral: Cathedral of St Paul in Dumka

Current leadership
- Pope: Leo XIV
- Bishop: Julius Marandi
- Metropolitan Archbishop: Vincent Aind

The Diocese of Dumka (Latin: Dumkaën(sis)) is a Latin Church ecclesiastical jurisdiction or diocese of the Catholic Church in India's Jharkhand state. It is a suffragan in the ecclesiastical province of the metropolitan Archdiocese of Ranchi.

Its episcopal see is the cathedral of St. Paul in the city of Dumka.

== History ==
- 17 January 1952: Established as the Apostolic Prefecture of Malda on territory split off from the Metropolitan Archdiocese of Calcutta
- 8 August 1962: Promoted as Diocese of Dumka
- Lost territory on 8 June 1978 to establish the Roman Catholic Diocese of Raiganj, to which the incumbent bishop moved
- Lost territory on 27 June to establish the Roman Catholic Diocese of Purnea

== Ordinaries ==
Apostolic Prefect of Malda

- Fr. Adam Grossi, Society of Foreign Missions (P.M.E.) (March 28, 1952 – 1962)

Bishops of Dumka

- Leo Tigga, Society of Jesus (S.J.) (August 8, 1962 – June 8, 1978), later Bishop of split-off Roman Catholic Diocese of Raiganj (India) (1978.06.08 – 1986.01.29)
- Telesphore Placidus Toppo (June 8, 1978 – November 8, 1984), later Coadjutor Archbishop of Ranchi (India) (1984.11.08 – 1985.08.07), succeeding as Metropolitan Archbishop of Ranchi (1985.08.07 – ...), Vice-President of Conference of Catholic Bishops of India (1998 – 2002), President of Conference of Catholic Bishops of India (2002 – 2005), Cardinal-priest of S. Cuore di Gesù agonizzante a Vitinia (2003.10.21 [2004.05.23] – ...), President of Catholic Bishops’ Conference of India (2004.01.12 – 2008.02.19), Member of Commission of Cardinals overseeing the Institute for Works of Religion (2008.02.24 – 2014.01.15), President of Conference of Catholic Bishops of India (2011.01.12 – 2013.02), Member of Council of Cardinals for the Study of Organisational and Economic Problems of the Apostolic See (2012.06.23 – 2014.02.24)
- Stephen M. Tiru (April 18, 1986 – April 1, 1995), later Bishop of Khunti (India) (1995.04.01 – 2012.03.03)
- Julius Marandi (June 14, 1997 – ...)

== Sources and external links ==
- GCatholic.org, with incumbent biography links ^{[self-published]}
- Catholic Hierarchy ^{[self-published]}
