= Charles Soreng =

Indian Jesuit bishop and director of Ranchi seminary

Charles Soreng S.J.
- Bishop of Hazaribag
- Church: Catholic Church
- Diocese: Diocese of Hazaribag
- In office: 1 April 1995 – 8 September 2012
- Predecessor: Diocese erected
- Successor: Jojo Anand
- Previous post: Bishop of Daltonganj (1989-1995)

Orders
- Ordination: 24 March 1969
- Consecration: 9 February 1990 by Telesphore Toppo

Personal details
- Born: 18 August 1934 Chirratoli (west of Simdega), Presidency of Fort William in Bengal, British Raj, British Empire
- Died: 11 January 2019 (aged 84) Ranchi, Jharkhand, India

Charles Soreng (18 August 1934 – 11 January 2019 in Ranchi, India) was a Jesuit Indian priest, educationist and director of the Ranchi seminary. Appointed bishop of Daltonganj in 1989 he was transferred to the new diocese of Hazaribag in 1995.

== Life ==
Soreng was born in India and was ordained to the Catholic priesthood in 1969. He served as bishop of the Roman Catholic Diocese of Daltonganj from 1989 to 1995 and as bishop of the Roman Catholic Diocese of Hazaribag from 1995 to 2012.
