= Diocese of Simdega =

Roman Catholic diocese in Jharkhand, India

Coordinates: 22.6173°N 84.4858°E

Diocese of Simdega Dioecesis Simdegaënsis सिमडेगा के सूबा
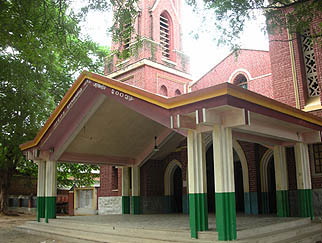

Location
- Country: India
- Ecclesiastical province: Ranchi
- Metropolitan: Ranchi

Statistics
- Area: 2,323 km^{2} (897 sq mi)
- Population: Total; Catholics: (as of 2022); 640,200; 215,301 (33.6%)
- Parishes: 37

Information
- Rite: Latin Rite
- Established: 28 May 1993
- Cathedral: Cathedral of St Anne in Simdega

Current leadership
- Pope: Leo XIV
- Bishop: Vincent Barwa
- Metropolitan Archbishop: Vincent Aind

The Roman Catholic Diocese of Simdega (Latin: Simdegaën(sis)) is a diocese located in Simdega district of Jharkhand in the ecclesiastical province of Ranchi in India.This is a rural diocese in the plateau of Chhota Nagpur.

== History ==
- May 28, 1993: Established as Diocese of Simdega from the Metropolitan Archdiocese of Ranchi

== Leadership ==
- Bishops of Simdega (Latin Rite)
  - Bishop Vincent Barwa (February 11, 2008 – present)
  - Bishop Joseph Minj (May 28, 1993 – February 11, 2008)
