= Trois-Ponts =

Municipality in Liège Province, Wallonia, Belgium

Trois-Ponts Troes-Ponts (Walloon)
- Municipality
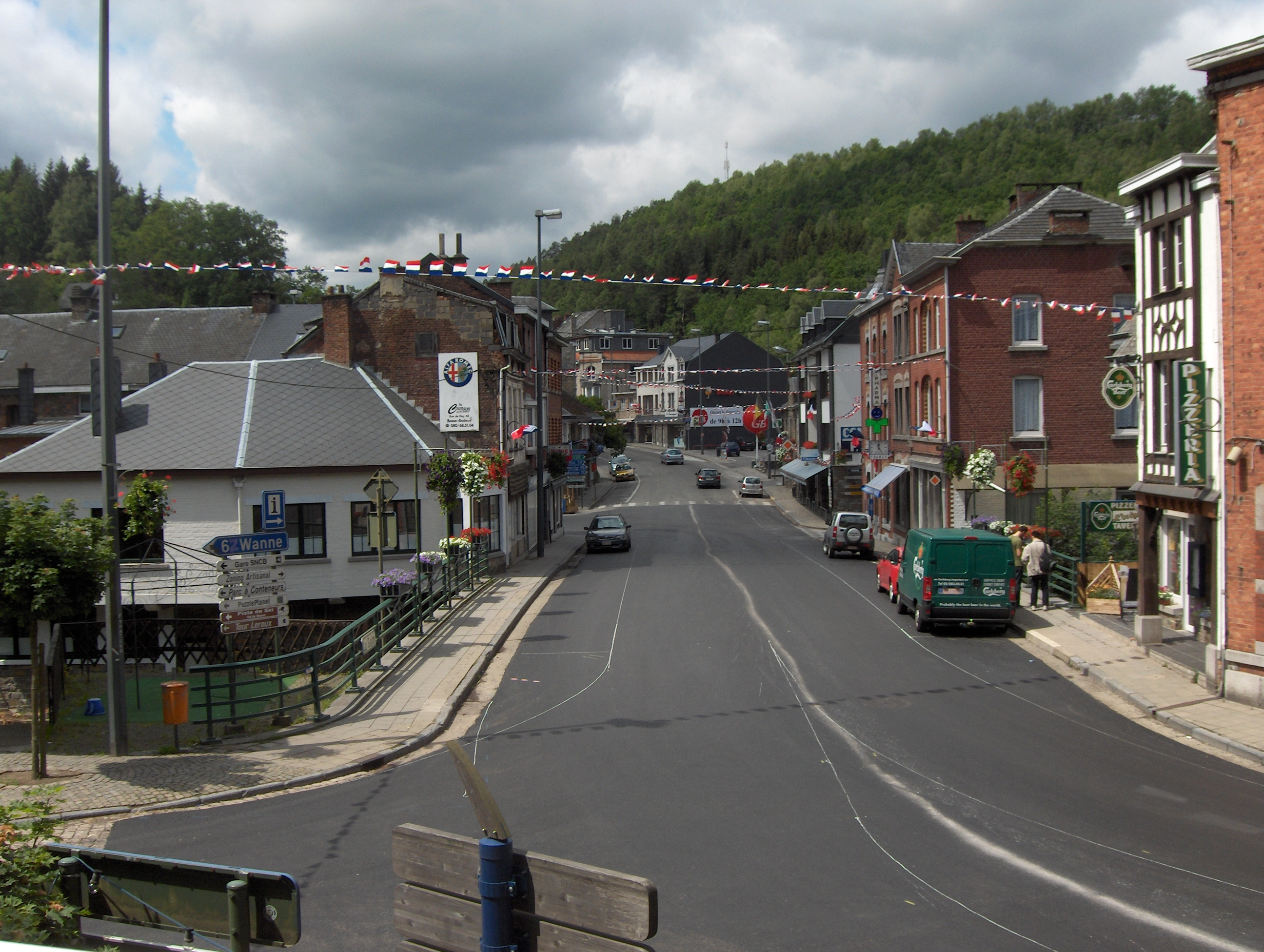

- Flag Coat of arms

- Location of Trois-Ponts in the province of Liège
- Interactive map of Trois-Ponts
- Location in Belgium
- Coordinates: 50°22′N 05°52′E
- Country: Belgium
- Community: French Community
- Region: Wallonia
- Province: Liège
- Arrondissement: Verviers

Government
  - Mayor: Francis Bairin
  - Governing party: ENSEMBLE

Area
  - Total: 68.83 km^{2} (26.58 sq mi)

Population (2018-01-01)
  - Total: 2,570
  - Density: 37.3/km^{2} (96.7/sq mi)
- Postal codes: 4980, 4983
- NIS code: 63086
- Area codes: 080
- Website: www.troisponts.be

Trois-Ponts (French: [tʁwɑ pɔ̃]; Walloon: Troes-Ponts; both literally "Three Bridges") is a municipality of Wallonia located in the province of Liège, Belgium.

On January 1, 2006, Trois-Ponts had a total population of 2,445. The total area is 68.90 km^{2} which gives a population density of 35 inhabitants per km^{2}. It is situated at the confluence of the rivers Amblève and Salm.

The municipality consists of the following districts: Basse-Bodeux, Fosse, and Wanne.

A railway junction at Trois-Ponts connected the Vennbahn with the Liège-Troisvierges, Luxembourg line.

== History ==
During the battle of the Bulge in December 1944, Trois-Ponts saw heavy fighting.

== See also ==
- List of protected heritage sites in Trois-Ponts
- Coo-Trois-Ponts Hydroelectric Power Station
