= Diocese of Jashpur =

Roman Catholic diocese in Chhattisgarh, India

Coordinates: 22.7434°N 83.9602°E

Diocese of Jashpur Dioecesis Jashpurensis जशपुर के सूबा

Location
- Country: India
- Ecclesiastical province: Raipur
- Metropolitan: Raipur

Statistics
- Area: 6,457 km^{2} (2,493 sq mi)
- Population: Total; Catholics: (as of 2006); 743,160; 185,666 (25%)

Information
- Denomination: Catholic
- Sui iuris church: Latin Church
- Rite: Roman Rite
- Established: 23 March 2006
- Cathedral: Cathedral of Our Lady of the Rosary

Current leadership
- Pope: Leo XIV
- Bishop: Emmanuel Kerketta
- Metropolitan Archbishop: Victor Henry Thakur

The Roman Catholic Diocese of Jashpur (Latin: Dioecesis Jashpurensis) in India was created on March 23, 2006. It is a suffragan diocese of the Archdiocese of Raipur. Its first bishop was Mar Victor Kindo, previously bishop of Raigarh, who died on 12 June 2008. On December 22, 2009 Pope Benedict XVI appointed Fr. Emmanuel Kerketta, the diocesan administrator and previous Vicar General, as the new bishop of Jashpur.

The diocese covers an area of 5,838 km^{2} of the territory previously belonging to the Diocese of Raigarh, in Chhattisgarh state. The see has its seat in Kunkuri, where the Cathedral of Our Lady of the Rosary is located.

The total population in the diocese is 739,780, of which 185,485 are Catholic. The diocese is subdivided into 46 parishes.

== Leadership ==
=== Bishops of Jashpur ===
- Bishop Victor Kindo, (23 March 2006 –‍ 12 June 2008)
- Bishop Emmanuel Kerketta, (22 December 2009 –‍ Present)
