= Our Lady of the Rosary Cathedral, Jashpur =

Our Lady of the Rosary
- Cathedral of Our Lady of the Rosary
- Location of the cathedral in Chhattisgarh Our Lady of the Rosary (India)
- 22°44′36″N 83°57′37″E
- Location: Kunkuri, Jashpur, Chhattisgarh
- Country: India
- Denomination: Catholic

History
- Status: Cathedral
- Founded: 1962
- Dedication: Our Lady of the Rosary

Architecture
- Functional status: Active
- Completed: 27 October 1979

Administration
- Diocese: Diocese of Jashpur

The Cathedral of Our Lady of the Rosary is located in Kunkuri town in Jashpur district of Chhattisgarh state in India. The cathedral was founded in 1962 in the period of Bishop Stanislas Tigga. J. M. Karsi drew its map and Joseph Toppo started its construction. After his death Manustain S. J. completed its construction in the period of Bishop Francis Ekka. It was inaugurated on 27 October 1979.

The Catholic cathedral at Kunkuri is the biggest church in the state. It is India's largest in terms of seating capacity.

The Cathedral of Our Lady of the Rosary is under the jurisdiction of the Diocese of Jashpur.
