= Paul Alois Lakra =

Indian Catholic priest

The Most Reverend Paul Alois Lakra
- Bishop of Gumla
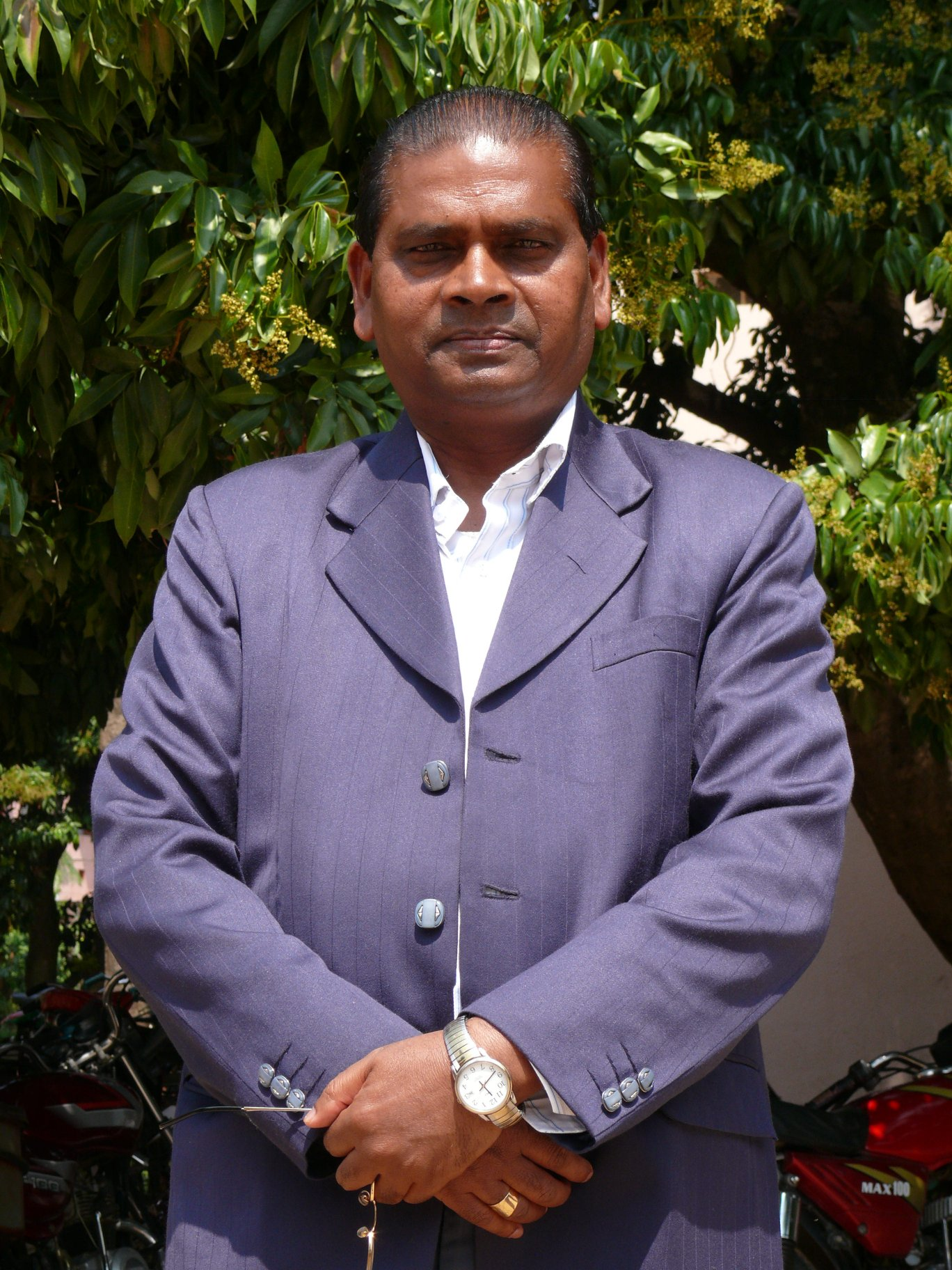
- Native name: पॉल अलोइस लकड़ा
- Church: Catholic Church
- Diocese: Gumla
- Predecessor: Michael Minj
- Successor: Linus Pingal Ekka

Orders
- Ordination: 6 May 1988
- Consecration: 5 April 2006 by Telesphore Toppo

Personal details
- Born: 11 July 1955 Naditoli, Gumla, India
- Died: 15 June 2021 (aged 65) Ranchi, India
- Denomination: Catholic

Paul Alois Lakra (11 July 1955 – 15 June 2021) was an Indian prelate of the Catholic Church who served as the Bishop of Gumla from 2006 until his death in 2021.

Lakra died in Ranchi on 15 June 2021, aged 65, from Covid-19 during the COVID-19 pandemic in India.

== See also ==
- List of Catholic bishops of India
