= Diocese of Raigarh =

Roman Catholic diocese in Chhattisgarh, India

Coordinates: 21.9033°N 83.3893°E

Diocese of Raigarh Dioecesis Raigarhensis रायगढ़ के सूबा

Location
- Country: India
- Ecclesiastical province: Raipur
- Metropolitan: Raipur

Statistics
- Area: 7,086 km^{2} (2,736 sq mi)
- Population: Total; Catholics: (as of 2010); 1,367,000; 61,770 (4.5%)

Information
- Rite: Latin Rite
- Cathedral: Cathedral of St. Michael in Raigarh
- Patron saint: Michael the Archangel

Current leadership
- Pope: Leo XIV
- Bishop: Paul Toppo
- Metropolitan Archbishop: Victor Henry Thakur

The Roman Catholic Diocese of Raigarh (Latin: Raigarhen(sis)) is a diocese located at the Bishop's House in Kunkuri, Raigarh. It is in the ecclesiastical province of Raipur in India.

== History ==
On 13 December 1951, it was established as Diocese of Raigarh–Ambikapur from the Diocese of Nagpur and Diocese of Ranchi. Later, on 10 November 1977, it was renamed as Diocese of Raigarh when the Diocese of Ambikapur was erected.

== Leadership ==
- Bishops of Raigarh (Latin Rite)
  - Bishop Paul Toppo (23 March 2006 – present)
  - Bishop Victor Kindo (25 November 1985 – 23 March 2006)
  - Bishop Francis Ekka (10 November 1977 – 15 March 1984)
- Bishops of Raigarh – Ambikapur (Latin Rite)
  - Bishop Francis Ekka (24 April 1971 – 10 November 1977)
  - Bishop Stanislaus Tigga (24 December 1957 – 9 July 1970)
  - Bishop Oscar Sevrin, S.J. (13 December 1951 – 8 November 1957)
