= Diocese of Khunti =

Roman Catholic diocese in Jharkhand, India

Coordinates: 23.0692°N 85.2793°E

Diocese of Khunti Dioecesis Khuntiensis खूंटी के सूबा
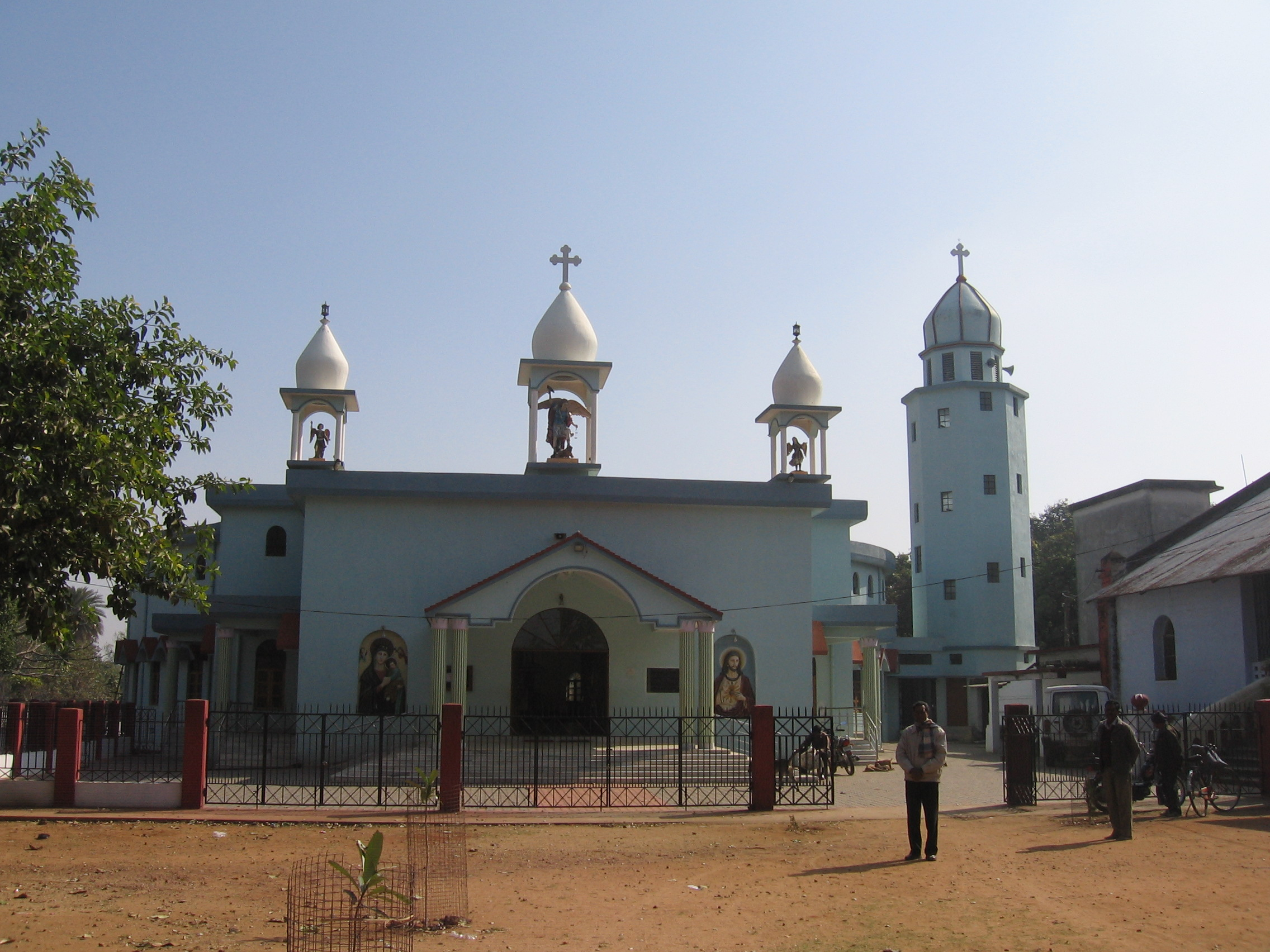

Location
- Country: India
- Ecclesiastical province: Ranchi
- Metropolitan: Ranchi

Statistics
- Area: 3,765 km^{2} (1,454 sq mi)
- Population: Total; Catholics: (as of 2006); 872,569; 81,989 (9.4%)

Information
- Rite: Latin Rite
- Established: 1 April 1995
- Cathedral: Cathedral of St Michael in Khunti

Current leadership
- Pope: Leo XIV
- Bishop: Binay Kandulna
- Metropolitan Archbishop: Telesphore Toppo

The Roman Catholic Diocese of Khunti (Latin: Khuntien(sis)) is a diocese located in the city of Khunti in the ecclesiastical province of Ranchi in India.

== History ==
- 1 April 1995: Established as Diocese of Khunti from the Metropolitan Archdiocese of Ranchi

== Leadership ==
- Bishops of Khunti (Latin Rite)
  - Bishop Binay Kandulna (30 November 2012 – present)
  - Bishop Stephen M. Tiru (1 April 1995 – 3 March 2012)
