= Diocese of Raiganj =

Roman Catholic diocese in West Bengal, India

Coordinates: 25.6667°N 88.1676°E

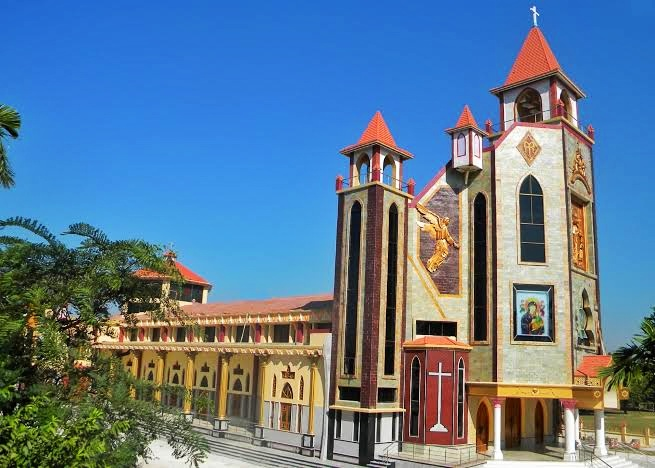

Location
- Country: India
- Ecclesiastical province: Calcutta
- Metropolitan: Calcutta

Statistics
- Area: 8,920 km^{2} (3,440 sq mi)
- Population: Total; Catholics: (as of 2010); 7,814,142; 95,663 (1.2%)
- Parishes: • Debijhora; • Chopra; • Islampur; • Majlispur; • Nichamari; • Nichitpur; • Altapur; • Bolaigaon; • Sinaipur; • Mustafanagar; • Garamtoli; • Jordighi; • Rajibpur; • Bastonkor; • Mahinagar; • Badamail; • Mehendipara; • Patiram; • Bishrail; • Kumarganj; • Pransnagar; • Jitarpur; • Banjhapara; • Dikul; • Bangar; • Kathnidanga; • Agunpur; • Alampur; • Rahutara; • Rathbari

Information
- Cathedral: St. Joseph the Worker Cathedral, Chotparua
- Patron saint: Saint Joseph

Current leadership
- Pope: Pope Leo XIV
- Bishop: Bishop Fuljence Aloysius Tigga (2016-Present); Bishop Alphonsus F. D'Souza, S.J. (1987–2016); Bishop Leo Tigga, S.J. (1978–1986)
- Metropolitan Archbishop: The Most Rev. Thomas D'Souza

The Roman Catholic Diocese of Raiganj is located in Raiganj, Uttar Dinajpur district, West Bengal, India. Established on June 8, 1978, by Pope Paul VI through the Apostolic Bull Ut Petrus et Pastor, it was formed by detaching territories from the Diocese of Dumka, specifically the districts of West Dinajpur and Malda. Subsequently, West Dinajpur was divided into North and South Dinajpur districts.

== History ==
- June 8, 1978: Established as the Diocese of Raiganj from the Diocese of Dumka
- The St. Joseph the Worker Cathedral, located in Chotparua village near Raiganj, serves as the diocesan cathedral. The current structure was inaugurated on November 17, 2010, replacing the previous tin-roofed church that had become inadequate for the growing Catholic community. The cathedral, designed by architect Arvinda Chatterjee, features Greek-style pillars, stained glass, and a hexagonal dome. It can accommodate up to 2,000 people.

== Leadership ==
- Bishops of Raiganj (Latin Rite)
  - Bishop Fuljence Aloysius Tigga, (2016-Present)
  - Bishop Alphonsus F. D'Souza, S.J. (January 26, 1987 – April 30, 2016)
  - Bishop Leo Tigga, S.J. (June 8, 1978 – January 29, 1986)
