= Stephen M. Tiru =

Indian Roman Catholic bishop

- Bishop of Khunti
- Church: Catholic Church
- Diocese: Diocese of Khunti
- In office: 1 April 1995 – 3 March 2012
- Predecessor: Diocese erected
- Successor: Binay Kandulna
- Previous post: Bishop of Dumka (1986-1995)

Orders
- Ordination: 4 May 1969
- Consecration: 7 October 1986 by Telesphore Toppo

Personal details
- Born: 1 December 1937
- Died: 3 March 2012 (aged 74)

Stephen M. Tiru (1 December 1937 – 3 March 2012) was the Roman Catholic bishop of the Roman Catholic Diocese of Khunti, India.

Ordained to the priesthood in 1969, Tiru became bishop in 1986.
