= Victor Henry Thakur =

Indian clergyman, archbishop of Raipur

The Most Reverend Victor Henry Thakur
- Archbishop of Raipur
- Archdiocese: Roman Catholic Archdiocese of Raipur
- See: Roman Catholic Archdiocese of Raipur
- Appointed: 3 July 2013
- Installed: 19 September 2013
- Predecessor: Joseph Augustine Charanakunnel
- Successor: Incumbent
- Other post: Chairman of the Education Commission of the Bihar Regional Council of Bishops
- Previous post: Bishop of Bettiah; Chancellor of the Diocese of Raipur

Orders
- Ordination: 3 May 1984
- Consecration: 11 November 1998 by Cardinal Telesphore Toppo

Personal details
- Born: 1 July 1954 (age 71) Chakhni, Bihar, India
- Residence: Archbishop's House, Khristbandhu Niwas, Byron Bazar, Raipur 492 001 Chhattisgarh

Styles of Victor Henry Thakur
- Reference style: The Most Reverend
- Spoken style: Your Excellency
- Religious style: Monsignor
- Posthumous style: not applicable

Archbishop Victor Henry Thakur, born 1 July 1954 at Chakhni, Bihar is the serving archbishop of the Roman Catholic Archdiocese of Raipur.

== Priesthood ==
He was ordained as a catholic priest on 3 May 1984.

== Episcopate ==
He was appointed as Bishop of Bettiah on 27 June 1998 and ordained on 11 November 1998. He was appointed Archbishop of Raipur on 3 July 2013 and installed on 19 September 2013. He has served as Chancellor of the Diocese of Raipur and, as of 2017, is chairman of the education commission of the Bihar Regional Council of Bishops.

== See also ==
List of Catholic bishops of India
