= Leo Tigga =

Indian Catholic bishop

Leo Tigga S.J.
- Bishop of Raiganj
- Church: Catholic Church
- Diocese: Diocese of Raiganj
- In office: 8 June 1978 – 29 January 1986
- Predecessor: Diocese erected
- Successor: Alphonsus F. D'Souza
- Previous post: Bishop of Dumka (1962-1978)

Orders
- Ordination: 21 November 1948
- Consecration: 7 October 1962 by Mikiel Gonzi

Personal details
- Born: 31 January 1916 Paikpara, Calcutta, Presidency of Fort William in Bengal, British Raj, British Empire
- Died: 29 January 1986 (aged 69)

Leo Tigga S.J. (31 January 1916, Ward No. 4, Kolkata – 29 January 1986) was an Indian clergyman and bishop for the Roman Catholic Diocese of Raiganj. He became ordained in 1948. He was appointed bishop in 1978. He died in 1986.
