= Constant Lievens =

Belgian Jesuit priest and missionary

The Most Reverend Constant Lievens SJ
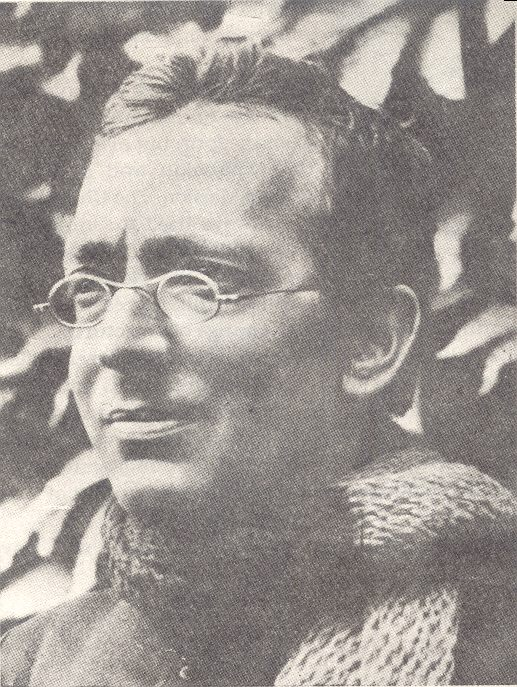
- Constant Lievens:The Apostle of Chotanagpur

Orders
- Ordination: 14 January 1883

Personal details
- Born: Constant Lievens; 10 April 1856; Belgium
- Died: 7 November 1893 (aged 37); Leuven, Belgium

Constant Lievens (11 April 1856 – 7 November 1893) was a Belgian (Flemish) Jesuit priest, missionary among the tribal peoples of Central India, particularly the Mundaris, Oraons. He is regarded as the apostle of the Chotanagpur (Jharkhand and Chhattisgarh states in central India).

== Biography ==
=== Early years and formation ===
Born in Moorslede, Belgium to a large rural Flemish family (six sisters and four brothers), Constant Lievens did his high school studies and philosophy in the Minor Seminary, Roeselare (1870-1877) before starting a first year of theological training at the seminary of Bruges. A strong desire to become an overseas missionary led him to ask for admission in the Society of Jesus (1878). As soon as the two-years novitiate spiritual training was completed, he was sent to India to complete his theological training in Asansol (West Bengal). Lievens was ordained priest in Calcutta on 14 January 1883.

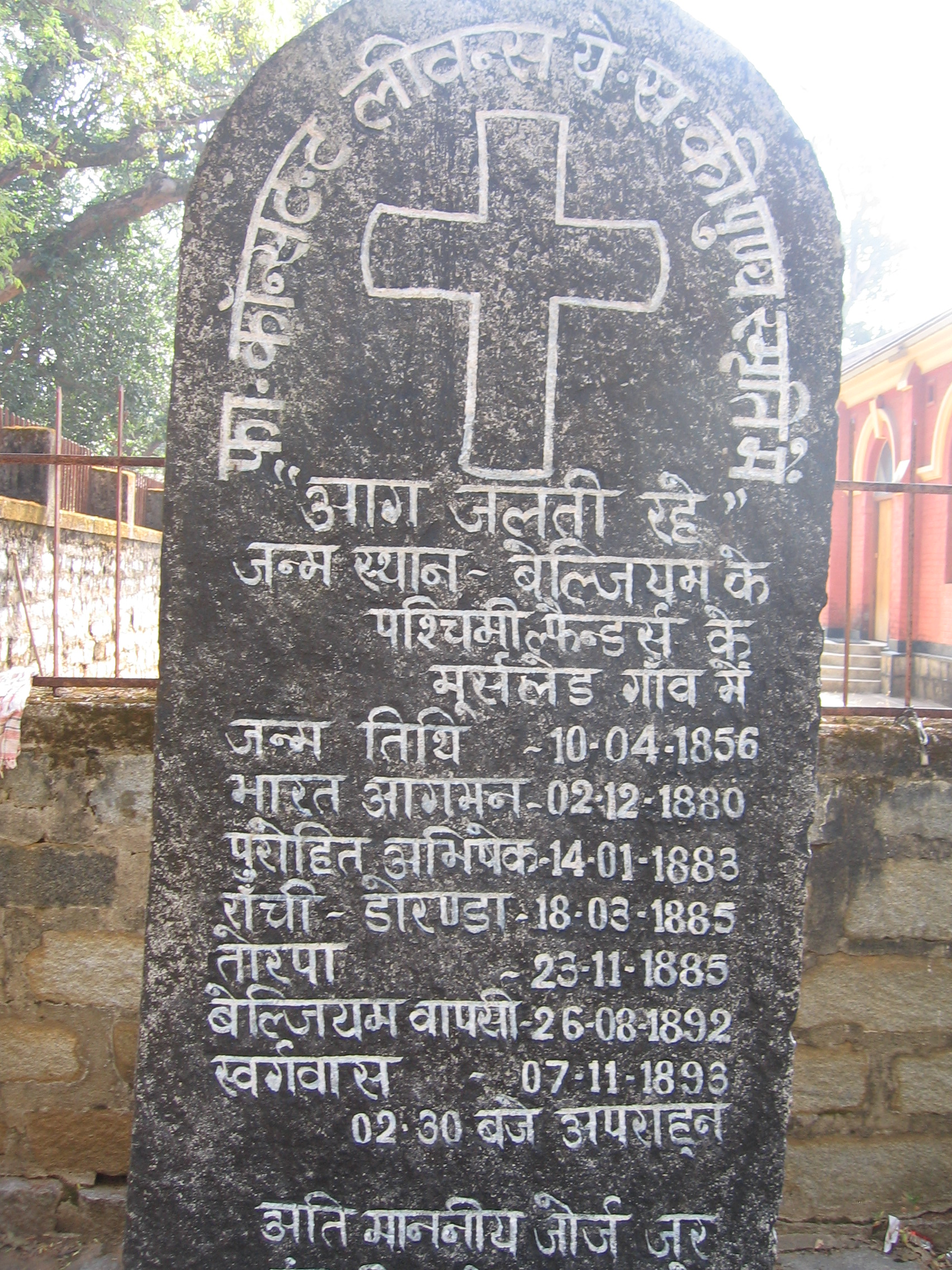
Memorial slab erected in Torpa, as per Mundari custom

=== Missionary work ===
Central India (the Chota Nagpur Plateau) was then opening up to missionary work and Lievens was sent to the area in 1885. After a few months of preliminary contacts and study of the language and customs of the Munda people Lievens settled in a hut at Torpa, a large village 60 km south of Ranchi (today's capital city of the Jharkhand state). That was in November 1885. Torpa became the centre of his activities. What he discovered was a disheartening situation of forced labour, acute indebtedness and systematic land spoliation. He understood that to speak of Christ and of the Gospel had little sense and purpose if the Mundas were not first reestablished in their basic rights and human dignity. He began gathering information on the tribal customary law and started defending in the English colonial courts the rights of those whose land had been taken away by deceit. In particular he succeeded in having the English magistrates accept that the non-written customary law be taken into consideration when dealing with tribal cases. Repeated successes at the "white man" court of justice won him the heart of the Mundas who saw in him a "saviour" and started accepting Christianity. Many asked and received baptism. A large conversion movement was set into motion. If in 1886 the number of Christians in the area was only 2,700, two years later they were already 15,000 baptized and some 40,000 catechumens. Lievens was overwhelmed by the requests for court help as well as by the evangelization work that had to follow. Other missionaries were sent to support him in his task. His own rural background made him understand without difficulty how much land was an important factor in the self-dignity and identity of the tribal populations of the Chotanagpur plateau, in particular the Mundas, Oraons and Kharias. Appointed Director of the Mission he shifted residence to Ranchi (1888-1892), the district headquarters, from where coordination of missionary activities (justice and social work, education and evangelization) was easier done. Christians were then numbering 73,000.

=== Illness and death ===
Suffering from tuberculosis, he was sent by doctors to the mountains of Darjeeling (end of 1891), but the urgency of the work - and disquieting news of apostasies - brought him hurriedly back to the Chota Nagpur where he again spent himself without counting. He baptized in a few months some 12,000 people in the Barway area (1892). A serious relapse forced him to stop definitively. His religious Superior sent him back to Belgium to recuperate. It was too late. In spite of medical care, the situation worsened and Lievens died in Leuven on 7 November 1893.

== Veneration and Souvenir ==
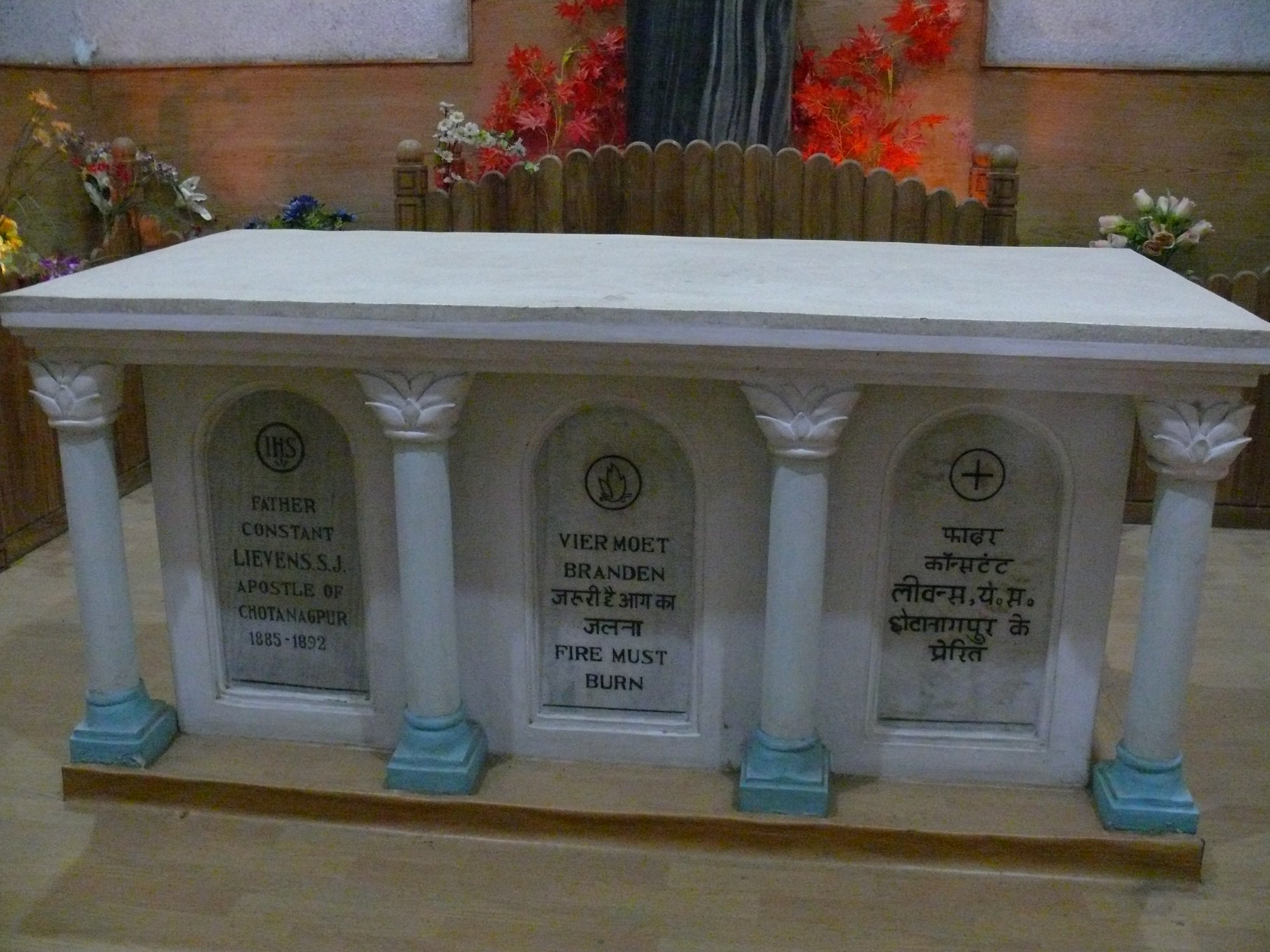
Tomb of Fr. Constant Lievens in Saint Mary's Cathedral of Ranchi

- Recently a preliminary investigation was begun in view of his possible beatification. His ashes were transferred to Ranchi (Jharkhand, India) where they are kept in the Catholic Cathedral of the Ranchi Archdiocese.
- A statue of Lievens on horseback was erected in Torpa, the heart of the Munda region and centre of Lievens activities. An identical statue of Lievens holding the crucifix was installed in Moorslede (Belgium), his native town.

== Writings ==
- Brieven van C. Lievens, Moorslede, 1994.

== Bibliography ==
- Houthaeve, R., Een leven als een wervelwind, Moorslede, 1992
- Bowen, F.J., Fr. C. Lievens, the apostle of Chotanagpur, Londres, 1936.
- Marlier, A., Een Jezuïet-missionaris, Bruxelles, 1956.
- Monbaliu, L., C.Lievens, de ridder van Chotanagpur, Roeselaere, 1983.
- Tete, P., C. Lievens and the Catholic Church of Chotanagpur, Ranchi, 1993.
