= List of protected heritage sites in Trois-Ponts =

This table shows an overview of the protected heritage sites in the Walloon town Trois-Ponts. This list is part of Belgium's national heritage.

Object	Year/architect	Town/section	Address	Coordinates	Number^{?}	Image
Farmhouse ^{(nl)} ^{(fr)}		Trois-Ponts	Haute-Bodeux n° 152	50.359688°N 5.804484°E	63086-CLT-0002-01 Info	
Ensemble formed by the stream of "Noir Rû" and the creation of a protection zone (ZP) ^{(nl)} ^{(fr)}		Trois-Ponts		50.350462°N 5.996383°E	63086-CLT-0004-01 Info	

== See also ==
- List of protected heritage sites in Liège (province)
- Trois-Ponts
