= Mennonite Church in India =

The Mennonite Church in India (Bharatiya Mennonite Church in India ki Pratinidhi Sabha) is a Mennonite denomination of India. It has about 3,500 members. It has 19 congregations. Its bishop has his seat at the town of Dhamtari in Chhattisgarh. It is part of the Mennonite World Conference.

The Mennonite Church in India was established in 1897 by the missionaries from then Mennonite Board of Missions of Elkhart, Indiana USA. Among the first Indian members of the church were seven men from Dhamtari. The church started its preaching ministry from Ama Bagicha. In 1910 the missionaries opened Dhamtari Christian hospital, Bathena followed by churches, schools, and mission hospitals in the nearby places. The church celebrated its centenary year in October 2011 which was attended by 22 churches at a conference Dhamtari. The centenary celebration was held from 25 to 27 October 2011, and the jubilee function was celebrated on 30 October.

P.J. Malagar was the first Indian bishop followed by Bishop Javiour and Bishop S.S. Kunjam.

Executive Committee Bishop N. Ashawan currently holds the MCI conference as moderator. Deacon Vikal Pravin Rao is the secretary. Dr. SAtyendra Netam is the voice moderator, Deacon S.C. Khristy is the treasurer, Rev. Madhukant Masih, Rev. Santosh Masih, Rev. Thomas Paul, Dr. Neerja Netam, Dr. Pradeep Kumar Martin, Mr. Rajneesh Ram, Mr. Nilesh Bux are the executive members of the conference 2017–2019.
