= Felix Toppo =

Indian prelate

The Most Reverend Felix Toppo S.J.
- Archbishop Emeritus of Ranchi
- Church: Roman Catholic Church
- Archdiocese: Ranchi
- See: Ranchi
- Appointed: 24 June 2018
- Installed: 6 August 2018
- Term ended: 30 December 2023
- Predecessor: Telesphore Toppo
- Successor: Vincent Aind
- Previous post: Bishop of Jamshedpur (1997-2018)

Orders
- Ordination: 14 April 1982
- Consecration: 27 September 1997 by Telesphore Toppo

Personal details
- Born: Felix Toppo; 21 November 1947 (age 78) Tongo, India
- Education: Pontifical Gregorian University
- Motto: Adveniat regnum tuum

Felix Toppo S.J. (born 21 November 1947) is an Indian prelate of the Catholic Church who was the Archbishop of Ranchi from 2018 to 2023. He was Bishop of Jamshedpur from 1997 to 2018.

He is a member of India's indigenous tribal people, like his predecessor as Archbishop of Ranchi, Cardinal Telesphore Toppo. The two are not related.

== Biography ==
He was born on 21 November 1947 in Tongo, in the Diocese of Gumla in Jharkhand.

He joined the Society of Jesus (Jesuits) in 1968. He was ordained a priest for the Society of Jesus on 14 April 1982. Within the Jesuits he has at times been director of pre-novices, novice master and superior.

He earned a master's degree in psychology from the Gregorian University, Rome, in 1990.

Pope John Paul II appointed him Bishop of Jamshedpur on 14 June 1997. He received his episcopal consecration from Cardinal Telesphore Placidus Toppo on 27 September 1997. Toppo was the first tribal to head the Diocese.

He chaired the CBCI Office for Clergy and Religious and headed the National Vocation Service Centre in Pune for four years.

In 2016, in an essay he contributed to a volume on gender and justice, he wrote that the Church's patriarchal structure had immediate consequences for women: "In the Church men traditionally are given the authoritative and leadership positions and women, religious or lay, are assigned generally to subservient roles rather than to decision making positions." (Note: The publisher is attached to Dharmaram College, "a pontifical athenaeum of theology, philosophy and canon law based in Bangalore".)

On 24 June 2018 Pope Francis named him Archbishop of Ranchi. He was installed there on 6 August. That same month, he confronted civil authorities, controlled by the Hindu nationalist Bharatiya Janata Party, when they initiated investigations of Catholic NGOs accused of "proselytization activities through inducement". He said no specifics were provided and complained that "nothing of the sort happens with pro-Hindu organizations". He said the probes were designed to divide the Catholic and Hindu within the tribal population in advance of elections. In December he praised the government for protecting tribal land rights by denying the right to purchase tribal lands to the non-tribal husband of a tribal woman.

As of 2018, he chaired the governing body of the Society for Medical Education, North India, of the Catholic Bishops' Conference of India (CBCI), which built a hospital to provide care for the tribal people and the poor. He was chairperson of the Regional Bishops' Council of Jharkhand and Andaman. He was also vice-chancellor of St. Albert's College, Ranchi, the region's major seminary. Within the Conference of Catholic Bishops of India, he was one of three members of the Commission for Vocations, Seminarians, Clergy and Religious.

Pope Francis accepted his resignation on 30 December 2023.
