= Wanne, Belgium =

Village in the Belgian municipality of Trois-Ponts

Coordinates: 50.3550°N 5.9217°E

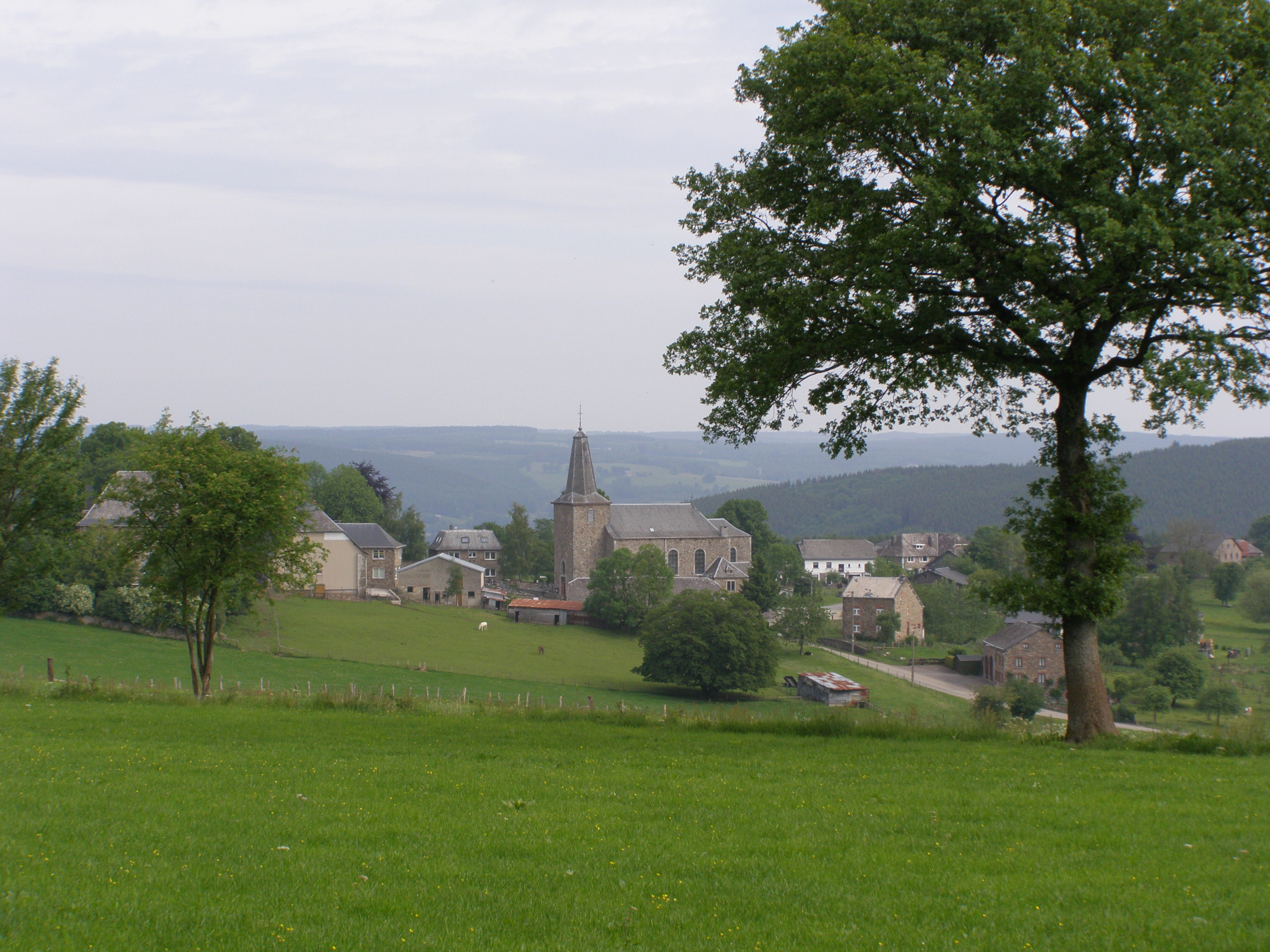
View of Wanne

Wanne (French pronunciation: [wan]; Walloon: Wene) is a village of Wallonia and a district of the municipality of Trois-Ponts, located in the province of liège, Belgium.

The villages of Aisômont, Wanneranval, Bouyin, Le Bairsoû, and Spineux are nearby.
