= Theodore Mascarenhas =

Catholic bishop of Daltonganj

The Most Reverend Theodore Mascarenhas
- Bishop of Daltonganj
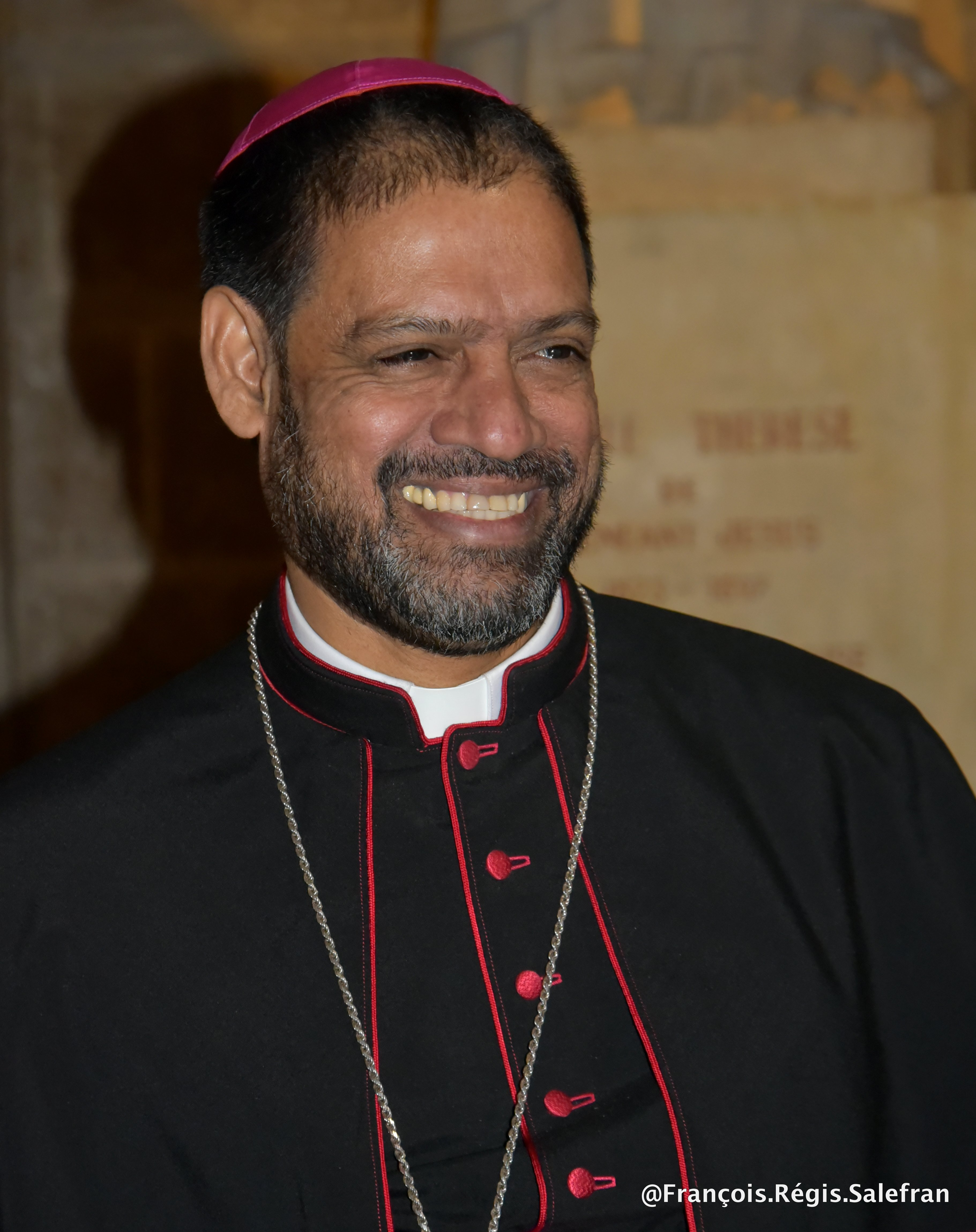
- Church: Roman Catholic
- Archdiocese: Ranchi Archdiocese
- Province: Ranchi Province
- Diocese: Diocese of Daltonganj
- Appointed: November 30, 2023
- Installed: January 11, 2024
- Predecessor: Gabriel Kujur
- Other post: Auxiliary Bishop of Ranchi

Orders
- Ordination: April 24, 1988

Personal details
- Born: 9 November 1960 (age 65) Camurlim, Goa, India

Theodore Mascarenhas (born 1960) is an Indian prelate of the Catholic Church who has serves as the bishop of the Diocese of Daltonganj since 2023.
