= Archdiocese of Raipur =

Roman Catholic archdiocese in Chhattisgarh, India

Coordinates: 21.2341°N 81.6427°E

Archdiocese of Raipur Archidioecesis Raipurensis रायपुर के सूबा

Location
- Country: India
- Ecclesiastical province: Raipur

Statistics
- Area: 60,819 km^{2} (23,482 sq mi)
- Population: Total; Catholics: (as of 2010); 15,553,000; 72,997 (0.4%)

Information
- Rite: Latin Rite
- Established: 16 January 1964; 62 years ago
- Cathedral: St. Joseph’s Cathedral in Raipur
- Patron saint: Mary Queen of the Apostles

Current leadership
- Pope: Leo XIV
- Metropolitan Archbishop: Victor Henry Thakur
- Bishops emeritus: Joseph Augustine Charanakunnel Archbishop Emeritus (2004-2013)

Website
- www.raipurarchdiocese.in

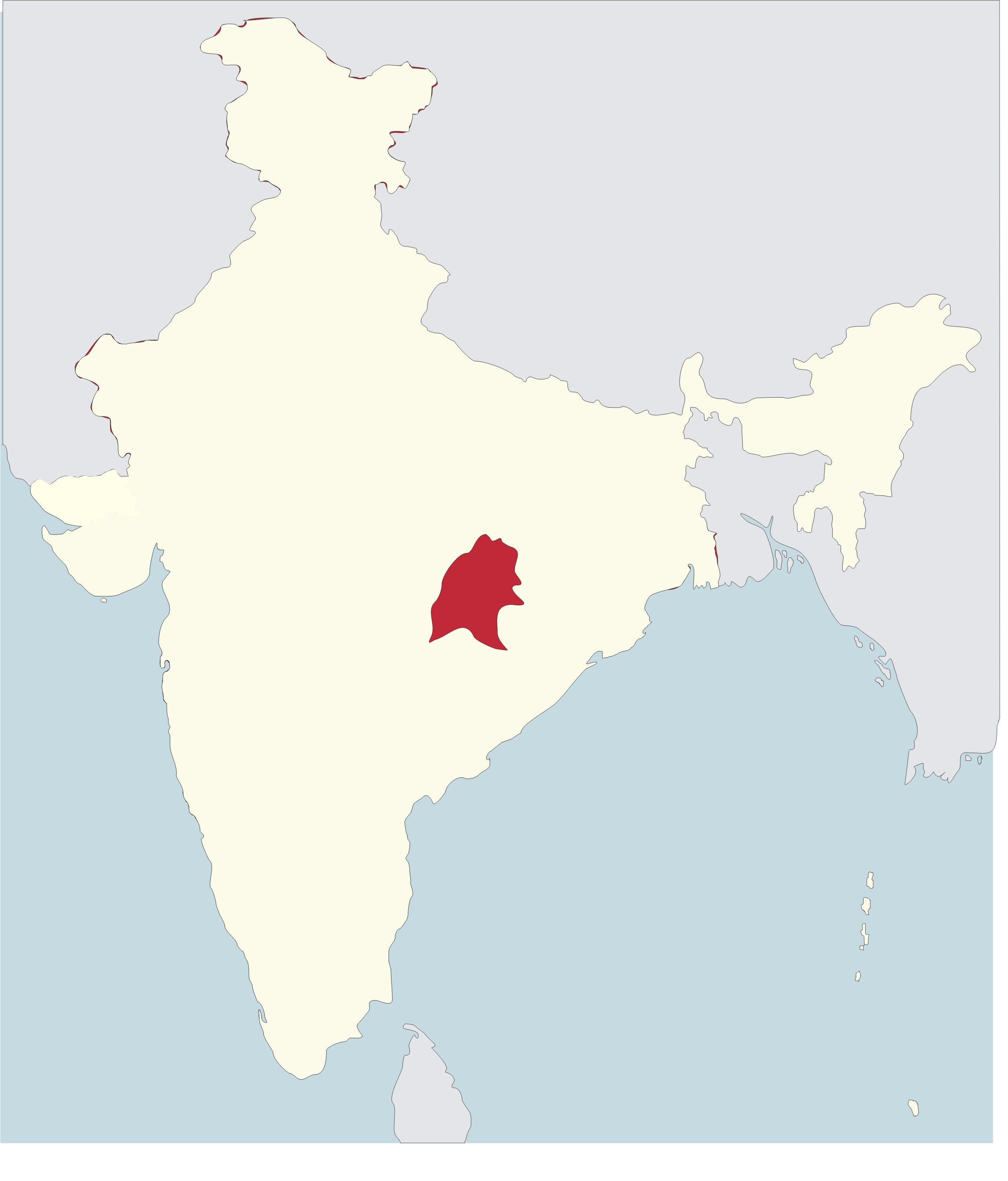
Map of the Roman Catholic Diocese of Raipur in India

The Roman Catholic Archdiocese of Raipur (Latin: Raipuren(sis)) is an archdiocese located in the city of Raipur in India.

== History ==
- 16 January 1964: Established as the Apostolic Prefecture of Raipur from the Metropolitan Archdiocese of Nagpur
- 5 July 1973: Promoted as Diocese of Raipur
- 27 February 2004: Promoted as Metropolitan Archdiocese of Raipur

== Leadership ==
- Archbishops of Raipur (Latin Rite)
  - Archbishop-elect Victor Henry Thakur (3 July 2013 – present); formerly, Bishop of the Roman Catholic Diocese of Bettiah, in Bettiah, India
  - Archbishop Joseph Augustine Charanakunnel (27 February 2004 – 3 July 2013); retired
- Bishops of Raipur (Latin Rite)
  - Bishop Joseph Augustine Charanakunnel (later Archbishop) (21 November 1992 – 27 February 2004)
  - Bishop Philip Ekka, S.J. (20 October 1984 – 15 February 1991)
- Prefects Apostolic of Raipur (Latin Rite)
  - Fr. John A. Weidner, S.A.C. (17 January 1964 – 1973)

== Suffragan dioceses ==
- Ambikapur
- Jagdalpur
- Jashpur
- Raigarh

== Education ==
=== Schools ===
- Weidner Memorial Senior Secondary School
