= Archdiocese of Ranchi =

Catholic archdiocese in Jharkhand, India

Coordinates: 23.3680°N 85.3300°E

Metropolitan Archdiocese of Ranchi Archidioecesis Metropolitae Ranchiensis रांची महानगर महाधर्मप्रांत
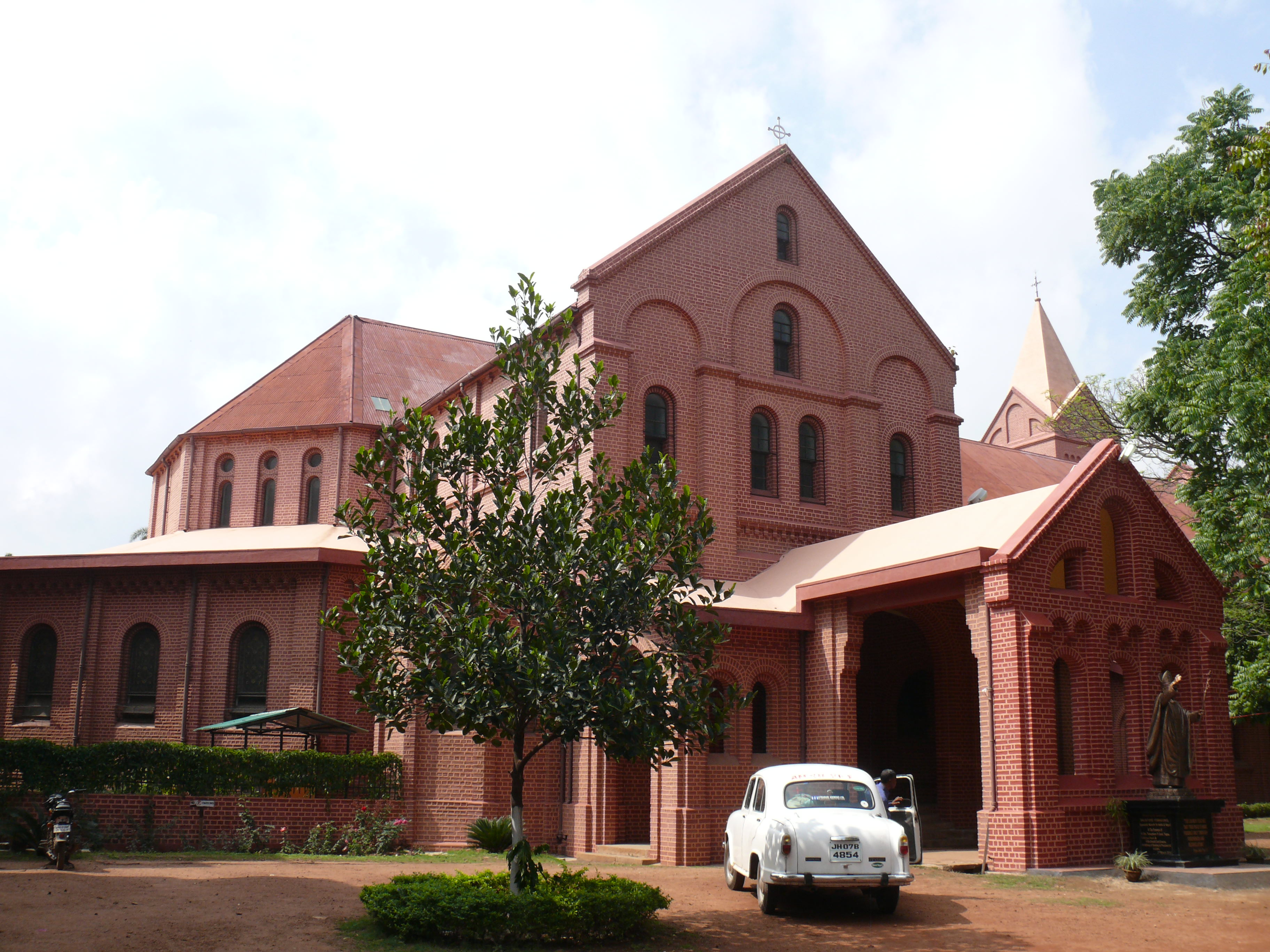
- Saint Mary's Cathedral, on Dr Kamil Bulcke Rd, Ranchi

Location
- Country: India
- Ecclesiastical province: Ranchi

Statistics
- Area: 5,299 km^{2} (2,046 sq mi)
- Population: Total; Catholics: (as of 2022); 3,703,427; 177,189 (4.8%)
- Parishes: 35

Information
- Denomination: Catholic
- Sui iuris church: Latin Church
- Rite: Roman Rite
- Established: 25 May 1927
- Cathedral: St. Mary's Cathedral, Ranchi
- Patron saint: St Francis Xavier

Current leadership
- Pope: Leo XIV
- Metropolitan Archbishop: Vincent Aind
- Bishops emeritus: Felix Toppo

Website
- https://www.ranchiarchdiocese.com/

The Ranchi Catholic Metropolitan Archdiocese (Latin: Archidioecesis Metropolitae Ranchiensis) comprises the districts of Ranchi and Lohardaga of Jharkhand state, India. It was established by a decree of the Holy See dated 25 May 1927, when it was separated from the Calcutta Archdiocese to form a new Diocese, with its episcopal seat at Ranchi. In 1953 it was elevated to the status of an archdiocese. The Roman Catholic Archdiocese of Ranchi declares that it "subscribes to ahimsa and satyagraha".

== Background ==
The first Belgian Jesuit to enter Chotanagpur was Fr Auguste Stockman. He traveled by bullock cart from Midnapur and after a difficult journey of a fortnight reached Chaibasa on 25 November 1868. His work among the Ho tribe did not yield results, so he moved towards Ranchi district in January 1875.

Other Belgian Jesuits came to Ranchi in 1877 to act as military chaplains to the troops at Doranda (Ranchi). As the prospects of evangelization among the tribals of Chotanagpur were bright, the first mission stations were opened among the Mundas. However, the real impetus came from Fr Constant Lievens, who arrived at Doranda on 18 March 1885. He is often called the Apostle of Chotanagpur. He left Ranchi on 26 August 1892, a broken man. He died at Leuven in Belgium on 7 November 1893. A century later on 7 November 1993 his mortal remains were re-interred in the Ranchi Cathedral.

To assist the missionaries, the Loreto Sisters from Ireland opened a convent in the red Lodge on Purulia Road, Ranchi, in March 1890. It was here that the Daughters of St. Anne, a Diocesan Congregation, had their beginning in 1897. The Ursuline Sisters of Tildonk, Belgium established themselves in the same compound on 13 January 1903.

== History ==
By 1927 the Ranchi Mission had developed to such an extent that by decree of the Holy See, dated 25 May 1927, it was separated from the Calcutta Archdiocese to form a new Diocese with Ranchi as its Episcopal seat and Msgr. Louis Van Hoeck, sj, as the first bishop. He was succeeded by Rt. Rev. Oscar Sevrin sj, in 1934, who was pastor for 18 years (1934 - 1952).

As the faith spread and took firm root in Chotanagpur, the Catholic Church was being built up and developed, especially through parishes and schools. Soon the rapid growth of the mission made it imperative to call in other labourers, the S.V.D. Fathers, the Australian and American Jesuits.

For better pastoral care of the faithful, the vast Archdiocese of Ranchi was divided and on 14 June 1951, the Diocese of Sambalpur gave birth to Rourkela Diocese on 4 July 1979 and Ambikapur became a separate diocese on 14 December 1977. On 19 September 1953, the Diocese of Ranchi was raised to the status of an Archdiocese with Sambalpur and Cuttack as its suffragans. On 2 July 1962, the Diocese of Jamshedpur was created. Then in 1968, the Diocese of Patna and Bhagalpur and the Prefecture of Balasore were made suffragans of Ranchi Archdiocese. Again on 5 June 1971 the Diocese of Daltonganj, comprising the civil districts of Hazaribagh (which itself became a diocese on 12 May 1995), and Palamau was carved out of the Archdiocese of Ranchi. In 1980, Muzaffarpur Diocese was formed from a part of Patna Diocese and made suffragan of Ranchi.

The Andamans and Nicobar Islands, became part of Ranchi in 1947, and were since 1966 under the care of the Pilar Fathers, and became a new Diocese on 26 June 1984.

On 1 July 1993, two new Dioceses, Gumla and Simdega, were established with territories taken from the Ranchi Archdiocese. On 12 May 1995 the new Diocese of Khunti was established with territories taken from the Archdiocese of Ranchi. It comprises the whole Khunti civil Sub-division. In 1998 two more new Dioceses were created, North of the Ganges, and made suffragans of Ranchi, Bettiah and Purnea.

Thus the original Ranchi Diocese divided into 14 Dioceses including the present Archdiocese of Ranchi. On 16 March 1999 the Ranchi Ecclesiastical Province was bifurcated in anticipation of the creation of Jharkhand. Patna, Capital of Bihar, became an Archdiocese with four suffragans: Bettiah, Bhagalpur, Muzaffarpur and Purnea.

The dioceses Daltonganj, Dumka, Gumla, Hazaribag, Jamshedpur, Khunti, Port Blair and Simdega are suffragans of the archdiocese.

== Archbishops of Ranchi ==
- Louis Van Hoeck, S.J. (15 February 1928 - 30 April 1933)
- Oscar Sevrin, S.J. (9 April 1934 - 13 December 1951)
- Nicolas Kujur, S.J. (13 December 1951 - 25 July 1960)
- Pius Kerketta, S.J. (7 March 1961 -7 August 1985)
- Telesphore Toppo (1985 – 2018)
- Felix Toppo (24 June 2018 – 30 December 2023)
- Vincent Aind (30 December 2023 – present)

== Auxiliary Bishops of Ranchi ==
- Vincent Barwa, D.D. (9 September 2004 - 11 February 2008)
- Binay Kandulna, D.D. (11 February 2009 - 30 November 2012)
- Telesphore Bilung, S.V.D. (30 August 2014 -1 November 2021)
- Theodore Mascarenhas, S.F.X. (30 August 2014 – 30 November 2023)

== Saints and causes for canonisation ==
- Servant of God Constant Lievens, SJ. His Cause for Beatification was officially inaugurated at Moorslede, in the Diocese of Bruges Ursuline Sisters (Belgium) on 15 March 2001.
- Servant of God Mary Bernadette Prasad Kispotta
