= Vincent Barwa =

Roman Catholic Bishop of Simdega Diocese

The Most Reverend Vincent Barwa
- Bishop of Simdega
- Church: Roman Catholic
- Diocese: Roman Catholic Diocese of Simdega
- Predecessor: Joseph Minj

Orders
- Ordination: 2 May 1984

Personal details
- Born: 18 October 1953 (age 72)
- Denomination: Roman Catholic

Vincent Barwa (born October 18, 1953) is an Indian prelate of the Catholic Church who serves as the Bishop of Simdega from 2008.

== Early life ==
Bishop Vincent Barwa was born on October 18, 1953 in a small village of Rengairh, Simdega district of Jharkhand state. He was ordained priest on may 2, 1984, and was ordained Bishop on November 8, 1998. On September 9, 2004, Pope John Paul ll appointed him auxiliary Bishop of Ranchi. Pope Benedict XVI nominated him Bishop of Simdega on February 11, 2008.

== See also ==
- List of Catholic Bishops of India
