= Alphonsus F. D'Souza =

The Most Reverend Alphonsus F. D'Souza SJ
- Bishop of Raiganj
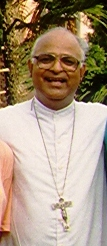
- Bishop Alphonsus D'Souza S.J.
- Church: Roman Catholic Church
- Archdiocese: Archdiocese of Calcutta
- Province: Calcutta
- Metropolis: Calcutta
- Diocese: Roman Catholic Diocese of Raiganj
- See: Raiganj
- Installed: 26 January 1987
- Term ended: 30 April 2016
- Predecessor: Bishop Leo Tigga, S.J.
- Successor: Fr. Fulgence Aloysius Tigga

Orders
- Ordination: 13 July 1971
- Consecration: 17 May 1987 by Bishop Linus Nirmal Gomes, S.J.
- Rank: Bishop

Personal details
- Born: Alphonsus Flavian D’Souza; 4 July 1939 Mangalore, Karnataka, India.
- Died: 30 April 2016 (aged 76) Raiganj, West Bengal, India
- Denomination: Roman Catholic
- Parents: Emmanuel D’Souza^{(Father)}, Magdalene D’Souza^{(Mother)}

Styles of Alphonsus D'Souza
- Reference style: The Most Reverend
- Spoken style: Your Grace

Ordination history of Alphonsus F. D'Souza
History
Priestly ordination
- Date: 13 July 1971
Episcopal consecration
- Principal consecrator: Bishop Linus Nirmal Gomes, S.J
- Co-consecrators: Bishop Eric Benjamin, Bishop Alan Basil de Lastic
- Date: 17 May 1987

Alphonsus Flavian D'Souza (4 July 1939, at Moudubelle (Mangalore) in India – 30 April 2016, at Raiganj, West Bengal, India), was an Indian Jesuit priest and Roman Catholic bishop of Raiganj from 1987 to his death.

== Biography ==
Seventh child in a family of 13 children, Alphonsus joined the Jesuit noviciate of Sitagarha (Bihar) in 1957. His Jesuit formation and training took him to Calcutta for a MA and doctorate in Indian philosophy (1963–1968) and to Austria (Innsbruck) and Germany (Tübingen) where he completed his Theological studies. On 13 July 1971 he was ordained priest in Tübingen.

Back in Calcutta (India) D'Souza was successively professor of Theology and dean of studies at the Calcutta Morning Star Regional Seminary (1972 to 1977). From 1977 to 1981 he was the Rector of the same. From 1981 to 1987: Provincial Superior of the Jesuits of West Bengal.

As he was about to complete his 6-year term as Provincial Alphonsus D'Souza received the news of his appointment as second bishop of the Raiganj diocese, a largely rural diocese of central West Bengal populated by Santal tribals. D'Souza served as bishop of the Roman Catholic Diocese of Raiganj, India from 1987 until his death in 2016.

The 11 parishes Bp Alphonsus inherited when he took charge in 1987 augmented to 33 at the time of his death. He brought various religious institutes in order to develop educational work, strengthened the Social Welfare Institute and opened a Minor seminary (1988). The cathedral of Raiganj is also to his credit. At the time of his death (2016) the diocese counts 97300 Catholics, mostly underprivileged Santals belonging to the largest tribal group of India.

Having reached the age of 75 in 2014, and with failing health, Bp Alphonsus submitted his resignation to Pope Francis who requested him to remain in his post until a successor could be found. Bp Alphonsus D'Souza died suddenly on 30 April 2016, in the sacristy of his cathedral, at Raiganj.
