= Diocese of Ambikapur =

Roman Catholic diocese in Chhattisgarh, India

Coordinates: 23.1369°N 83.1855°E

Diocese of Ambikapur Dioecesis Ambikapurensis अंबिकापुर के सूबा

Location
- Country: India
- Ecclesiastical province: Raipur
- Metropolitan: Raipur

Statistics
- Area: 22,337 km^{2} (8,624 sq mi)
- Population: Total; Catholics: (as of 2015); 2,870,000; 97,369 (3.4%)
- Parishes: 57

Information
- Rite: Latin Rite
- Established: 10 November 1977
- Cathedral: Cathedral of the Immaculate Mother of God in Ambikapur
- Patron saint: Immaculate Mother of God
- Secular priests: 112

Current leadership
- Pope: Leo XIV
- Bishop: Antonis Bara
- Metropolitan Archbishop: Victor Henry Thakur
- Bishops emeritus: Patras Minj

The Roman Catholic Diocese of Ambikapur (Latin: Ambikapuren(sis)) is a diocese located in the city of Ambikapur in the ecclesiastical province of Raipur in India.

== History ==
- 10 November 1977: Established as Diocese of Ambikapur from the Diocese of Raigarh–Ambikapur

== Leadership ==
- Bishops of Ambikapur (Latin Rite)
  - Bishop Antonis Bara (22 December 2021 – present)
  - Bishop Patras Minj, S.J. (5 July 1996 – 22 December 2021)
  - Bishop Paschal Topno, S.J. (later Archbishop) (28 October 1985 – 26 March 1994)
  - Bishop Philip Ekka, S.J. (10 November 1977 – 20 October 1984)
