= Vincent Aind =

Roman Catholic bishop

His Excellency, Most Reverend, Monsignor. Dr. Vincent Aind, Ph.D
- Metropolitan Archbishop of Ranchi
- Archdiocese: Ranchi
- Appointed: 30 December 2023
- Installed: 19 March 2024
- Predecessor: Felix Toppo
- Successor: Incumbent

Orders
- Ordination: 30 April 1984
- Consecration: 14 June 2015 by Telesphore Toppo

Personal details
- Born: 30 January 1955 (age 71) Kalchini, West Bengal, India
- Denomination: Roman Catholic
- Education: Pontifical Gregorian University and Jnana Deepa, Institute of Philosophy and Theology
- Motto: Ut diligatis invicem GIVE LOVE TO ONE ANOTHER

Vincent Aind is an Indian prelate of the Roman Catholic Church. He serves as the Metropolitan Archbishop of Ranchi since 2023. Previously he served as Bishop of Bagdogra from 2015 to 2023.

== Early life and education ==
He was born on 30 January 1955 at Kalchini, West Bengal. He completed his bachelor's degree in economics from St. Joseph's College, Darjeeling. He has a degree in philosophy from Morning Star Regional Seminary, Barrackpore. He holds a Licentiate in Philosophy from Jnana-Deepa and a Doctorate in Philosophy from the Pontifical Gregorian University. He completed his studies in theology at St. Joseph's Seminary, Mangalore.

He was ordained a priest on 30 April 1984.

== Episcopate ==
He was appointed Bishop of the Roman Catholic Diocese of Bagdogra on 7 April 2015 by Pope Francis and consecrated on 14 June by Telesphore Toppo. On 30 December 2023, he has been appointed Metropolitan Archbishop of Ranchi.

He is a Consultant and Member of the Diocesan Council for Economic Affairs of the Roman Catholic Diocese of Jalpaiguri and Regional Secretary of the Commission of the Clergy, Religious and Seminarians of the Regional Episcopal Conference of West Bengal. He is a member of the Editorial Team and executive committee of the Association of Christian Philosophers of India.

Pope Francis named him metropolitan archbishop of Ranchi on 30 December 2023.
