= Telesphore Toppo =

Catholic cardinal

His Eminence Telesphore Placidus Toppo
- Cardinal; Archbishop Emeritus of Ranchi
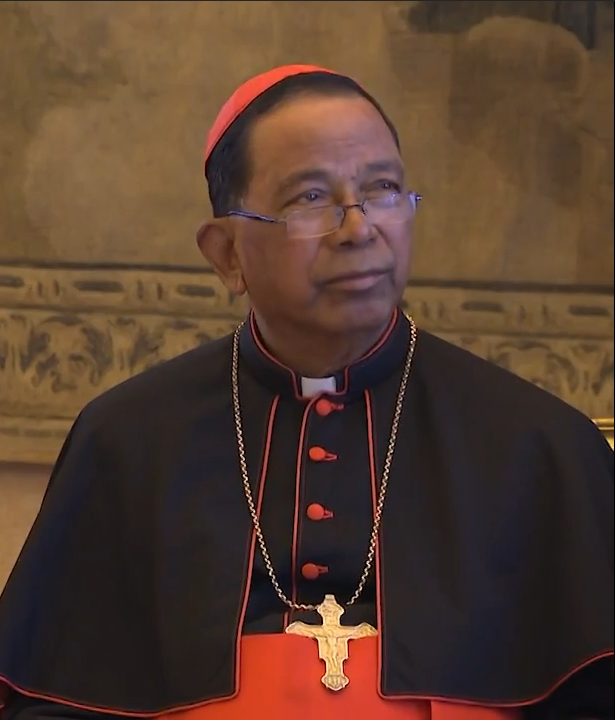
- Toppo in 2017
- Church: Roman Catholic Church
- Archdiocese: Ranchi
- Installed: 7 August 1985
- Term ended: 24 June 2018
- Predecessor: Pius Kerketta
- Successor: Felix Toppo
- Other post: Cardinal Priest of Sacro Cuore di Gesù agonizzante a Vitinia (2003–2023)
- Previous posts: Bishop of Dumka (1978–1984); Coadjutor Archbishop of Ranchi (1984–1985); Vice President of the Conference of Catholic Bishops of India (1998–2002); President of the Conference of Catholic Bishops of India (2002–2005); President of the Catholic Bishops' Conference of India (2004–2008); President of the Catholic Bishops' Conference of India (2011–2013)

Orders
- Ordination: 3 May 1969 by Franz von Streng
- Consecration: 7 October 1978 by Pius Kerketta
- Created cardinal: 21 October 2003 by Pope John Paul II
- Rank: Cardinal priest

Personal details
- Born: 15 October 1939 Chainpur, Bihar Province, British India
- Died: 4 October 2023 (aged 83) Ranchi, Jharkhand, India
- Education: St. Xavier's College, Ranchi; Pontifical Urban University
- Motto: Parare viam Domini ('Prepare the way of the Lord', Isaiah 40:3)

Styles of Telesphore Placidus Toppo
- Reference style: His Eminence
- Spoken style: Your Eminence
- Religious style: Cardinal
- Informal style: Cardinal
- See: Ranchi (emeritus)

Ordination history of Telesphore Toppo
History
Priestly ordination
- Ordained by: Franz von Streng
- Date: 3 May 1969
Episcopal consecration
- Principal consecrator: Pius Kerketta
- Co-consecrators: Leo Tigga; Joseph Robert Rodericks
- Date: 7 October 1978
Cardinalate
- Elevated by: Pope John Paul II
- Date: 21 October 2003
Episcopal succession
Bishops consecrated by Telesphore Toppo as principal consecrator
- Stephen M. Tiru: 7 October 1986
- Charles Soreng, S.J.: 9 February 1990
- Michael Minj, S.J.: 22 August 1993
- Joseph Minj: 24 August 1993
- Thomas Kozhimala: 7 October 1996
- Felix Toppo, S.J.: 27 September 1997
- Julius Marandi: 7 October 1997
- Gabriel Kujur, S.J.: 8 January 1998
- Vincent Barwa: 8 November 1998
- Victor Henry Thakur: 11 November 1998
- Paul Alois Lakra: 5 April 2006
- John Barwa, S.V.D.: 19 April 2006
- Clement Tirkey: 23 April 2006
- Paul Toppo: 24 May 2006
- Kurien Valiakandathil: 27 February 2007
- Angelus Kujur, S.J.: 18 April 2007
- Binay Kandulna: 30 November 2012
- Emmanuel Kerketta: 2 February 2010
- Jojo Anand: 8 December 2012
- Kishore Kumar Kujur: 29 September 2013
- Telesphore Bilung, S.V.D.: 30 August 2014
- Theodore Mascarenhas, S.F.X.: 30 August 2014
- Cajetan Francis Osta: 22 October 2014
- Vincent Aind: 14 June 2015

Telesphore Placidus Toppo (15 October 1939 – 4 October 2023) was an Indian prelate of the Catholic Church and a member of the aboriginal tribal community who was archbishop of the Archdiocese of Ranchi from 1985 to 2018, after serving as coadjutor there for a year. He was bishop of Dumka from 1978 to 1984. He was made a cardinal in 2003, the first from India's tribal population.

A polyglot, Toppo spoke Sadri, Oraon (mother tongues), Hindi (official language), English and Italian.

== Biography ==
Telesphore Placidus Toppo was born in Chainpur, in the state of Bihar and now in Jharkhand, India, on 15 October 1939, the eighth of ten children. He and his family belonged to Adivasi (indigenous tribal) community.

Toppo studied at St. Xavier's College, Ranchi, and theology at the Pontifical Urbaniana University in Rome. He was ordained priest on 3 May 1969 by Bishop Franz von Streng.

After a stint at Torpa (Jharkhand), as Headmaster of St Joseph's School and Director of the Lievens Vocational Center, Toppo was named Bishop of Dumka and received his episcopal consecration on 7 October 1978 from Archbishop Pius Kerketta SJ. He was appointed Coadjutor Archbishop of Ranchi, capital of the Jharkhand state, on 8 November 1984. He became Archbishop there on 7 August 1985.

Toppo was made cardinal-priest by Pope John Paul II on 21 October 2003, given the titular church of Sacro Cuore di Gesù agonizzante a Vitinia. He was the third cardinal from India, the first Adivasi and the first tribal Indian. He said the title of cardinal was a "mark of distinction for the tribal Church in India and recognition of its growth".

Toppo was elector at the 2005 papal conclave that elected Joseph Ratzinger as Pope Benedict XVI.

Toppo was elected to serve a two-year term president of Catholic Bishops' Conference of India on two occasions, in 2004 and 2006. He also served as president of the Conference of Catholic Bishops of India, made up of Latin Rite bishops only, from 2001 to 2004 and from 2011 to 2013.

At the Synod of Bishops in 2008, he endorsed ecumenical efforts but warned against "dilution of the Truth" and called for agreement on a common date for the celebration of Easter. At the Synod on the New Evangelization in 2012, he called on religious orders to commit themselves anew to missionary work.

Toppo was one of the cardinal electors who participated in the 2013 papal conclave that selected Pope Francis.

On 11 February 2008, he called for the proclamation of a new Marian dogma on Mary, Mediatrix of graces, Co-Redemptrix of humanity, with Jesus as sole and unique mediator.

Toppo sat on the Board of World Religious Leaders for the Elijah Interfaith Institute.

Pope Francis accepted Toppo's resignation as Archbishop of Ranchi on 24 June 2018, announcing as his successor Felix Toppo, Bishop of Jamshedpur.

Telesphore Toppo died at the Constant Lievens Hospital & Research Center in Mandar, on 4 October 2023, at the age of 83.

Catholic Church titles
Preceded by Leo Tigga	Bishop of Dumka; 8 June 1978 – 8 November 1984	Succeeded by Stephen Tiru
Preceded by Pius Kerketta	Archbishop of Ranchi; 7 August 1985 – 24 June 2018	Succeeded by Felix Toppo
Preceded by Patrick Paul D'Souza	Vice-President of the Conference of Catholic Bishops of India; 1998 – 2002	Succeeded by Valerian D'Souza
Preceded by Henry Sebastian D'Souza	President of the Conference of Catholic Bishops of India; 2002 – 2005	Succeeded by Oswald Gracias
Preceded by Mario Luigi Ciappi	Cardinal-Priest of Sacro Cuore di Gesù agonizzante a Vitinia; 21 October 2003 – 4 October 2023	Vacant
Preceded by Cyril Baselios	President of the Catholic Bishops' Conference of India; 12 January 2004 – 19 February 2008	Succeeded by Varkey Vithayathil
Preceded by Oswald Gracias	President of the Conference of Catholic Bishops of India; 12 January 2011 – February 2013	Succeeded by Oswald Gracias
