= List of cathedrals in India =

A cathedral (from the Greek kathedra (καθέδρα), seat, bench, chair) is a Christian church which contains the seat of a bishop, thus serving as the central church of a diocese.

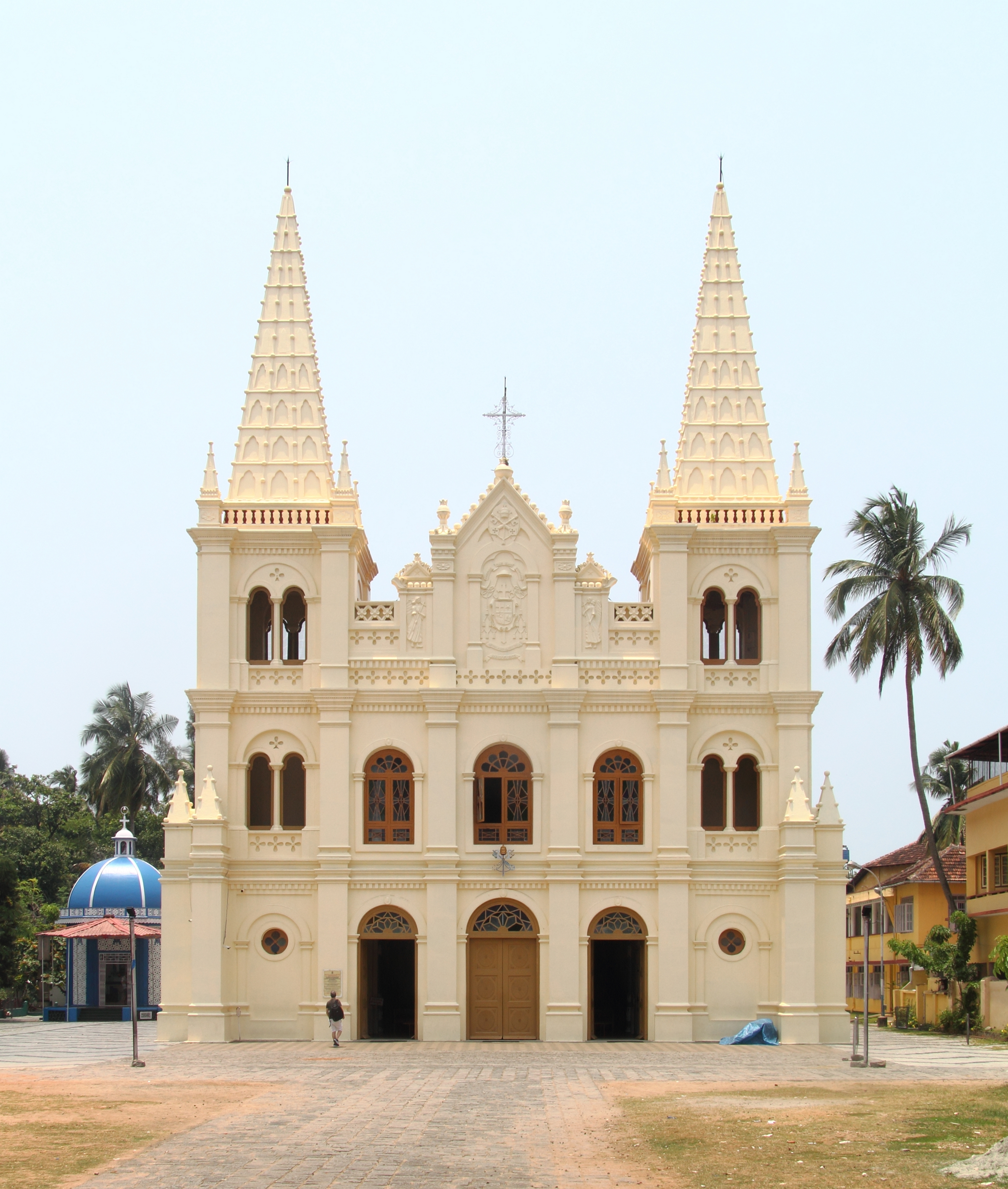
Santa Cruz Cathedral Basilica Fortcochin

This is the list of cathedrals in India sorted by denomination.

== Catholic Church ==
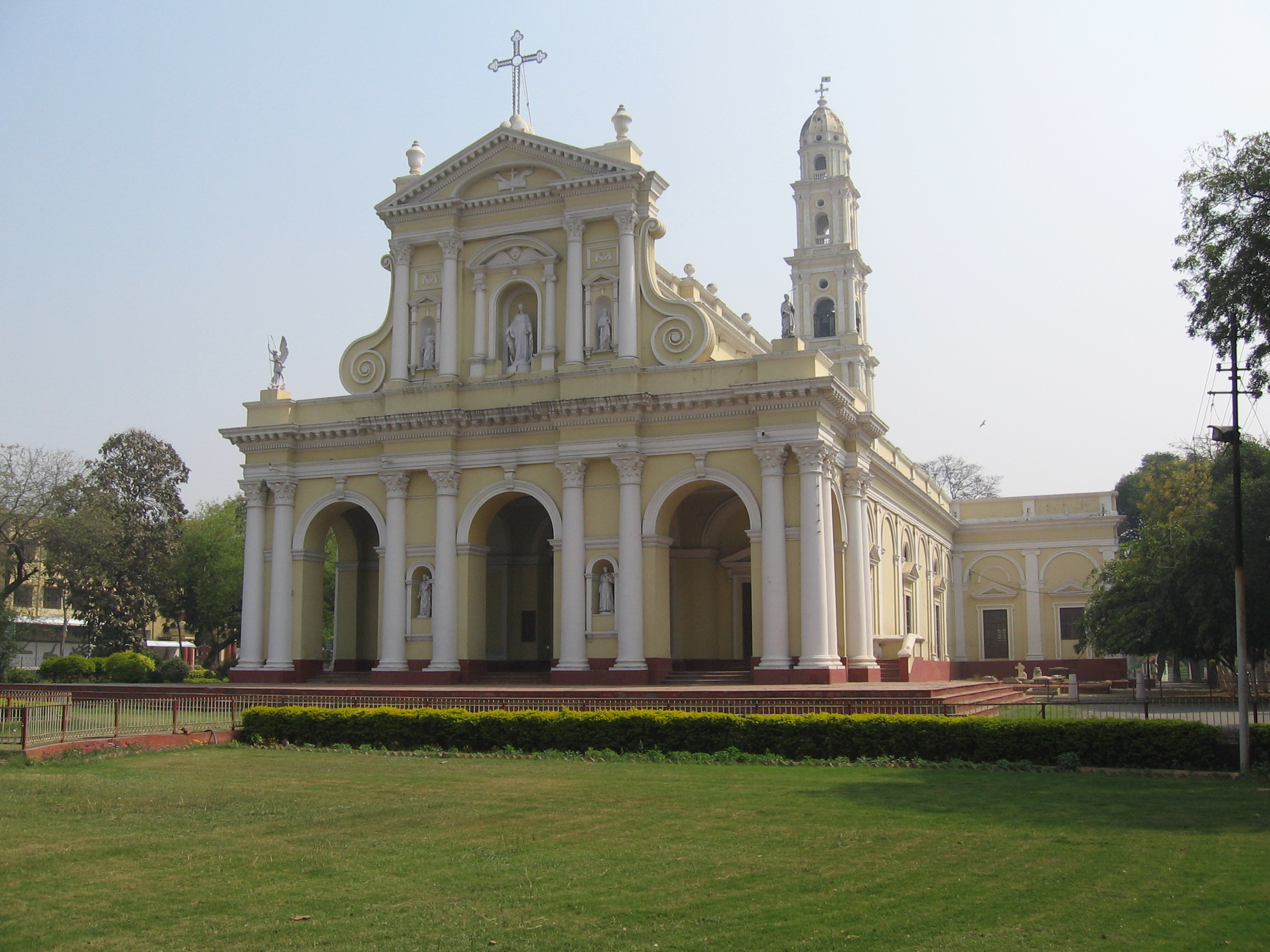
Cathedral of the Immaculate Conception in Agra

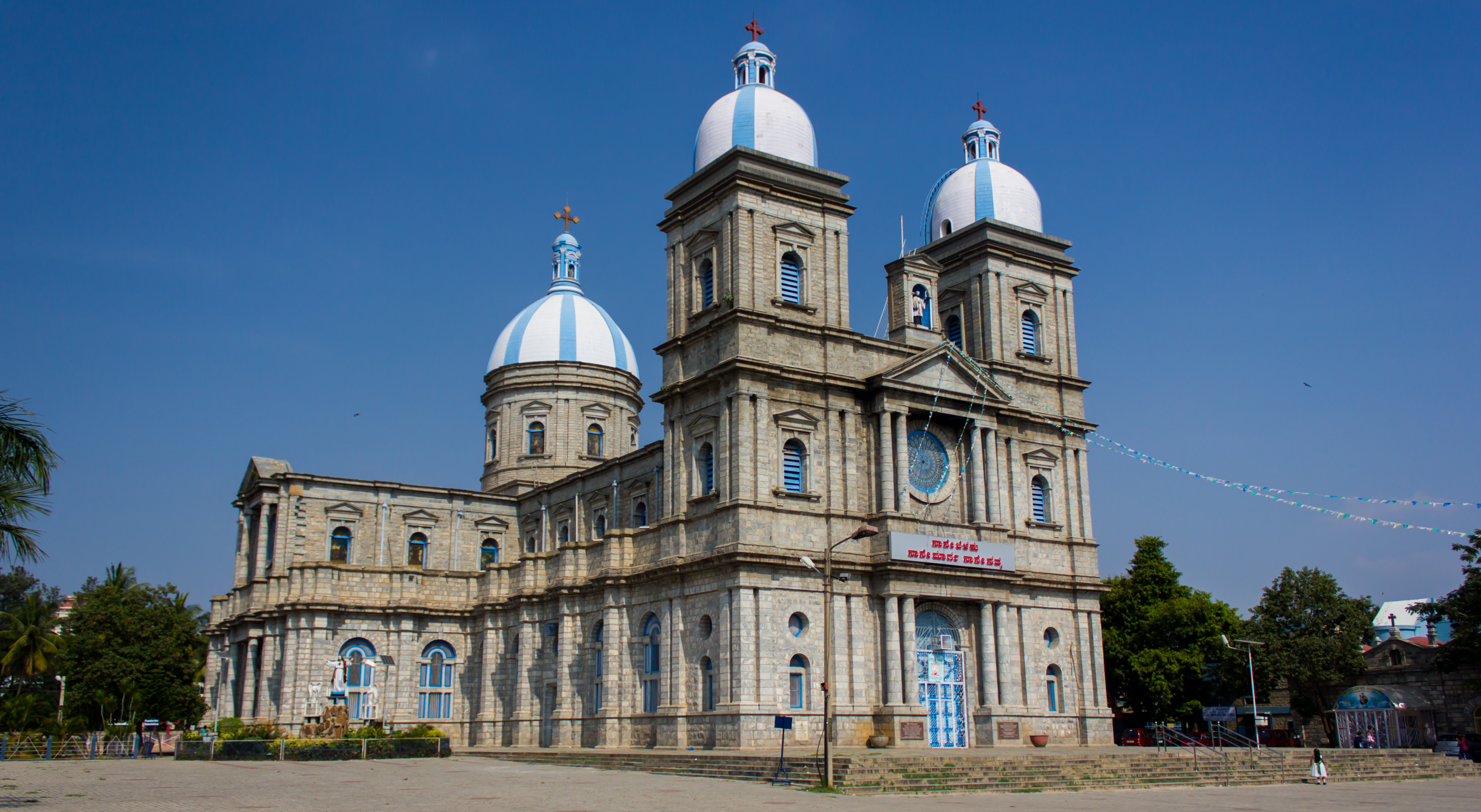
St. Francis Xavier's Cathedral in Bangalore

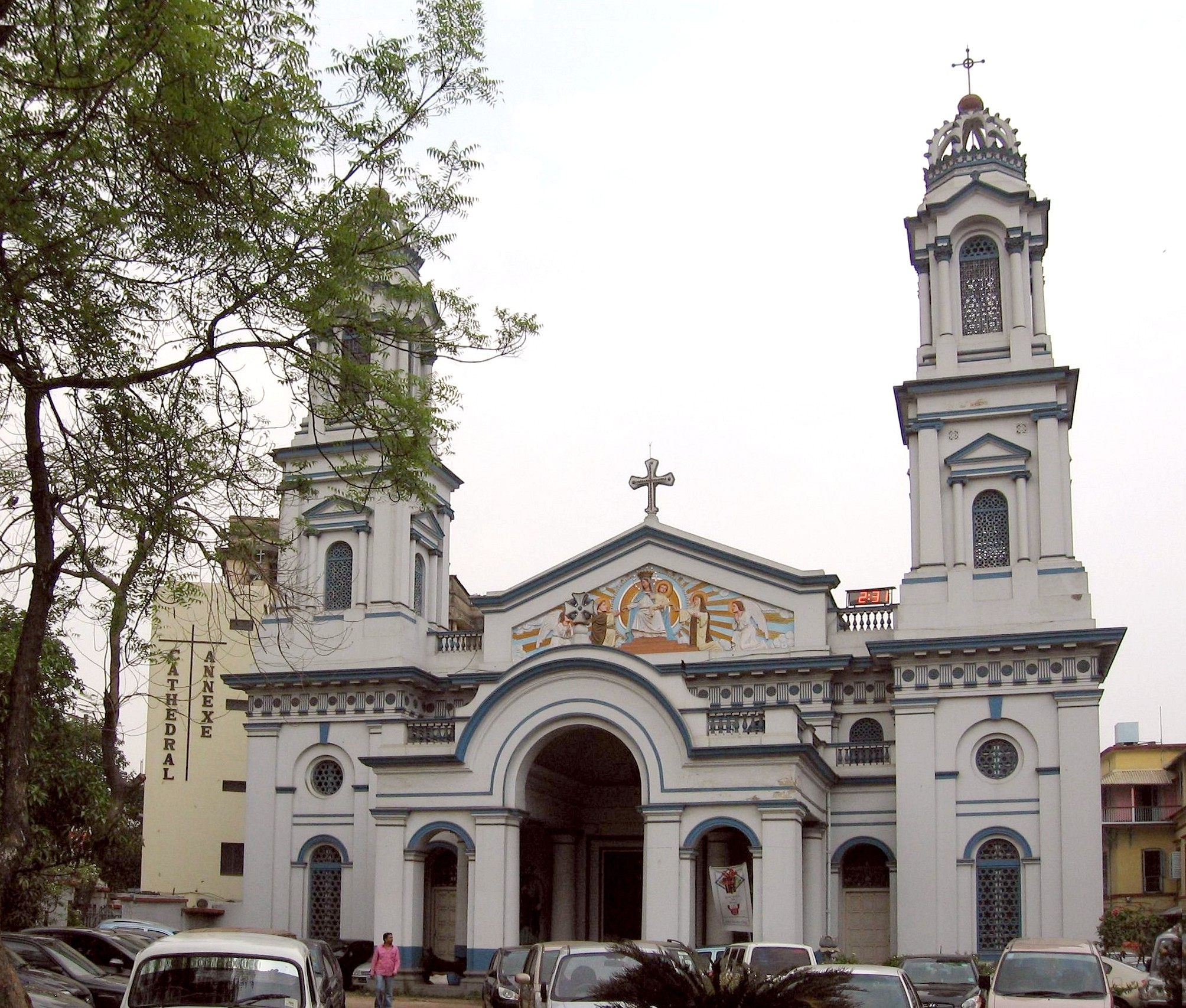
Holy Rosary Cathedral in Kolkata

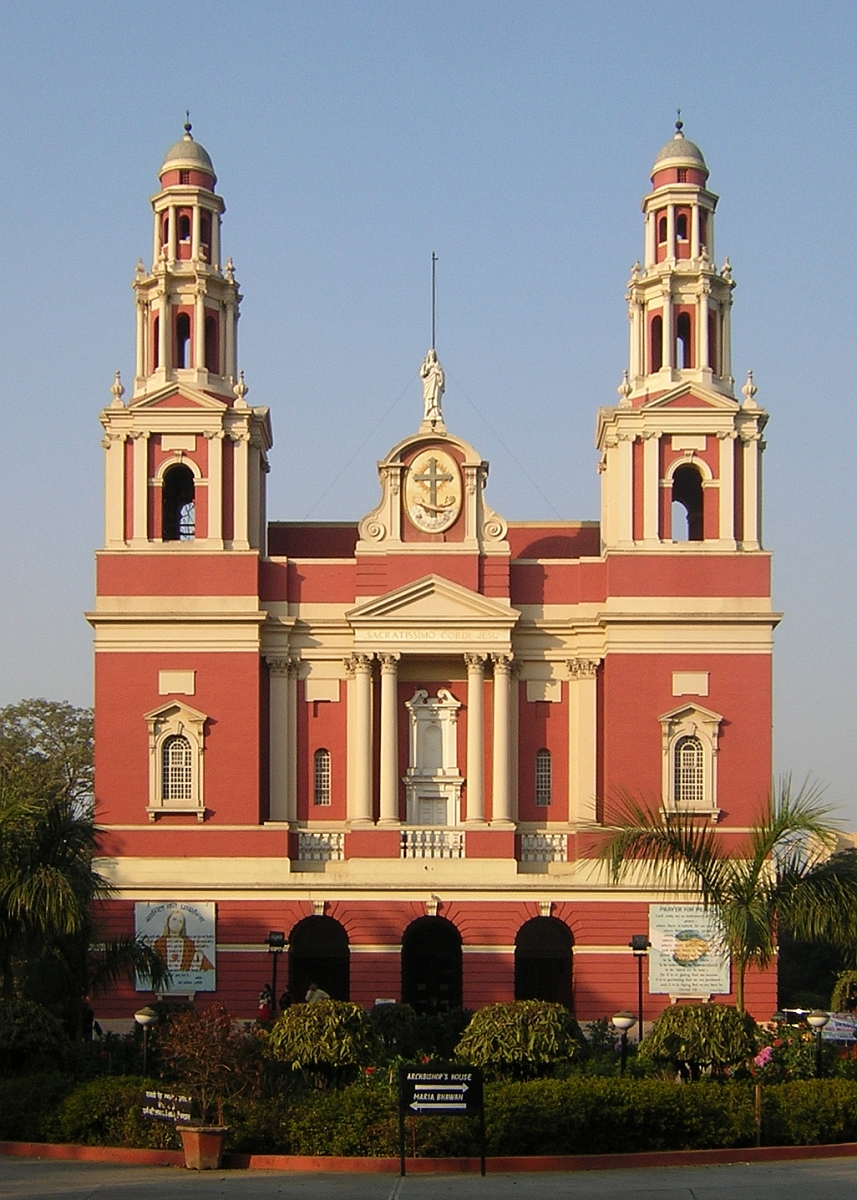
Sacred Heart Cathedral in New Delhi.

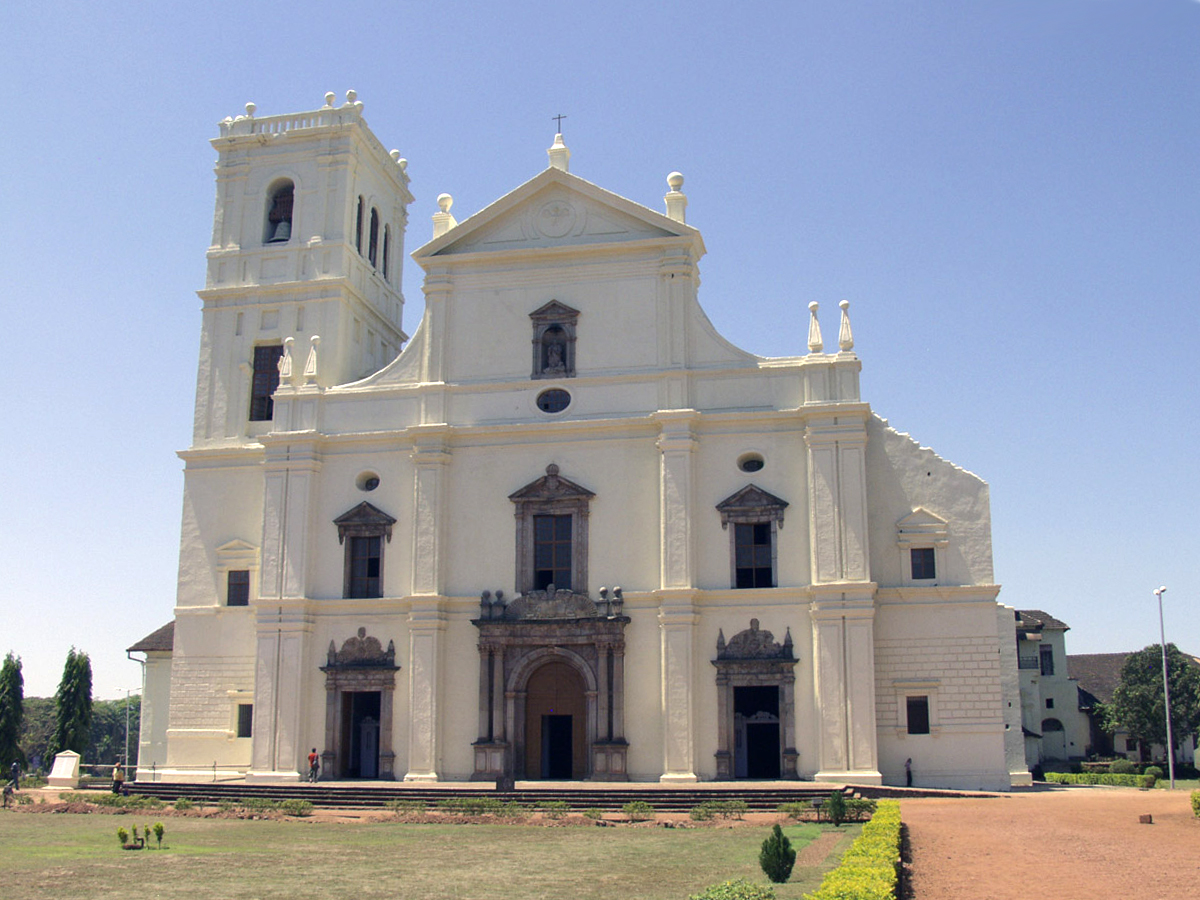
St. Catherine's Cathedral in Old Goa.

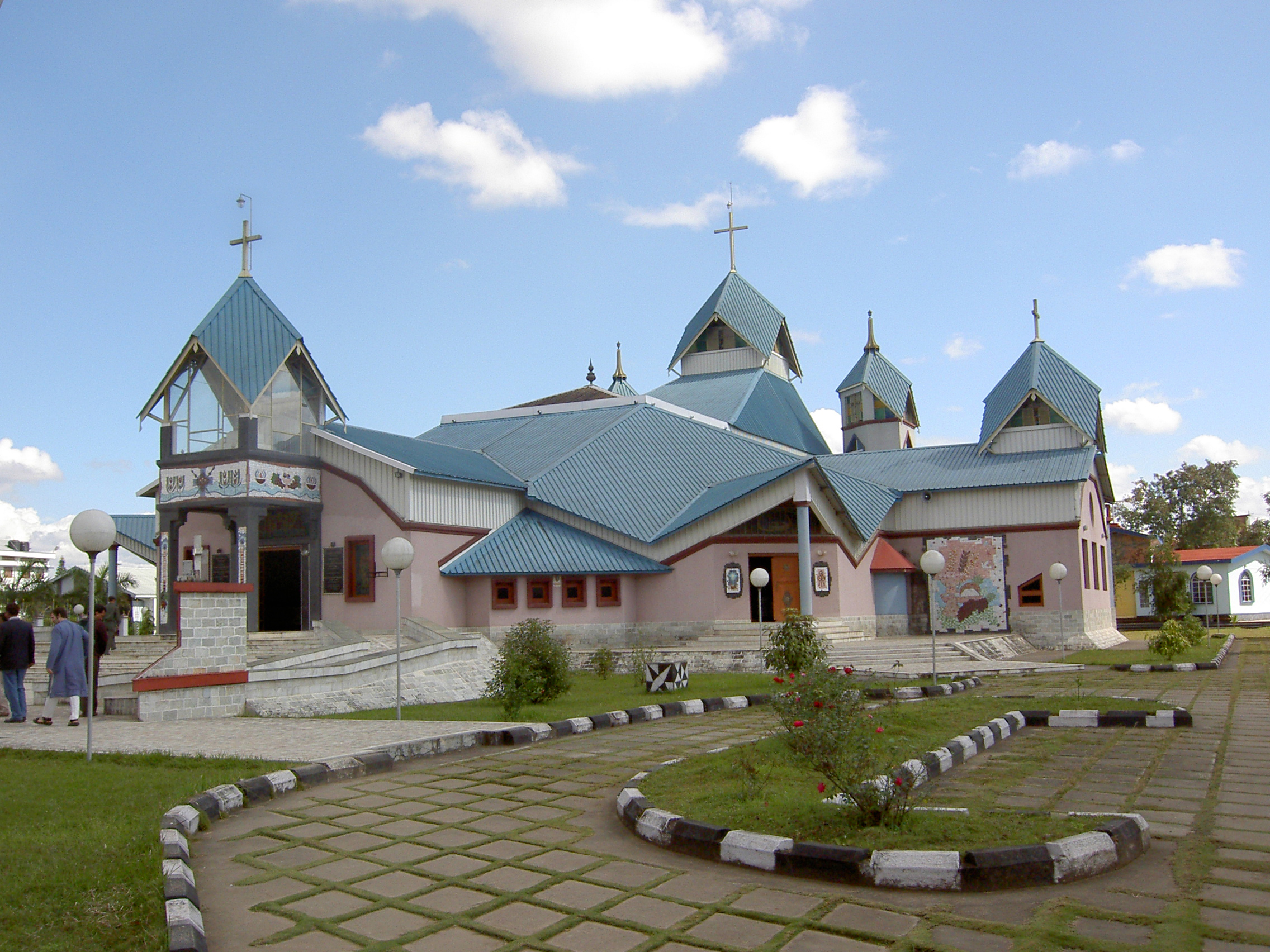
St. Joseph's Cathedral in Imphal

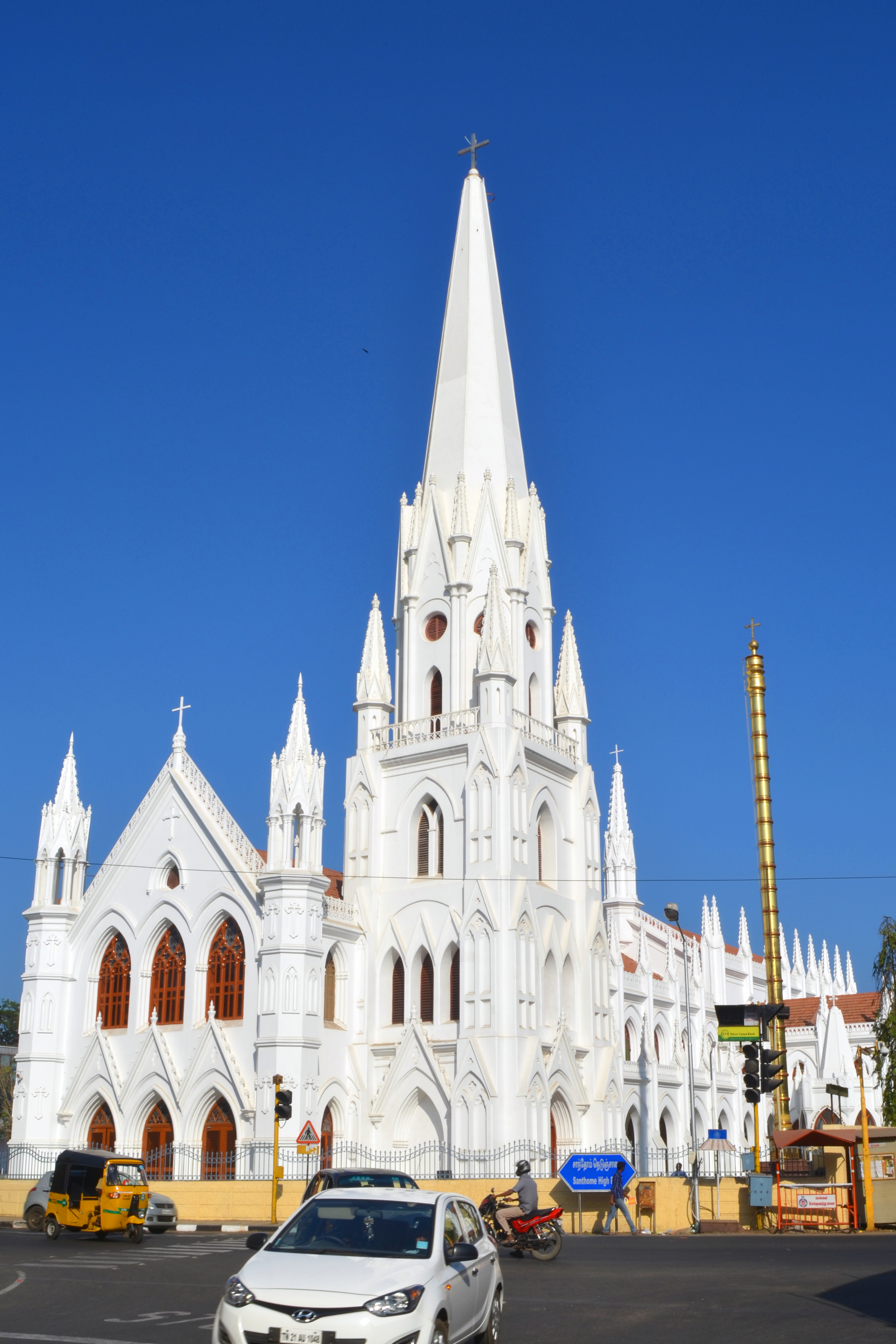
Santhome Cathedral Basilica in Chennai.

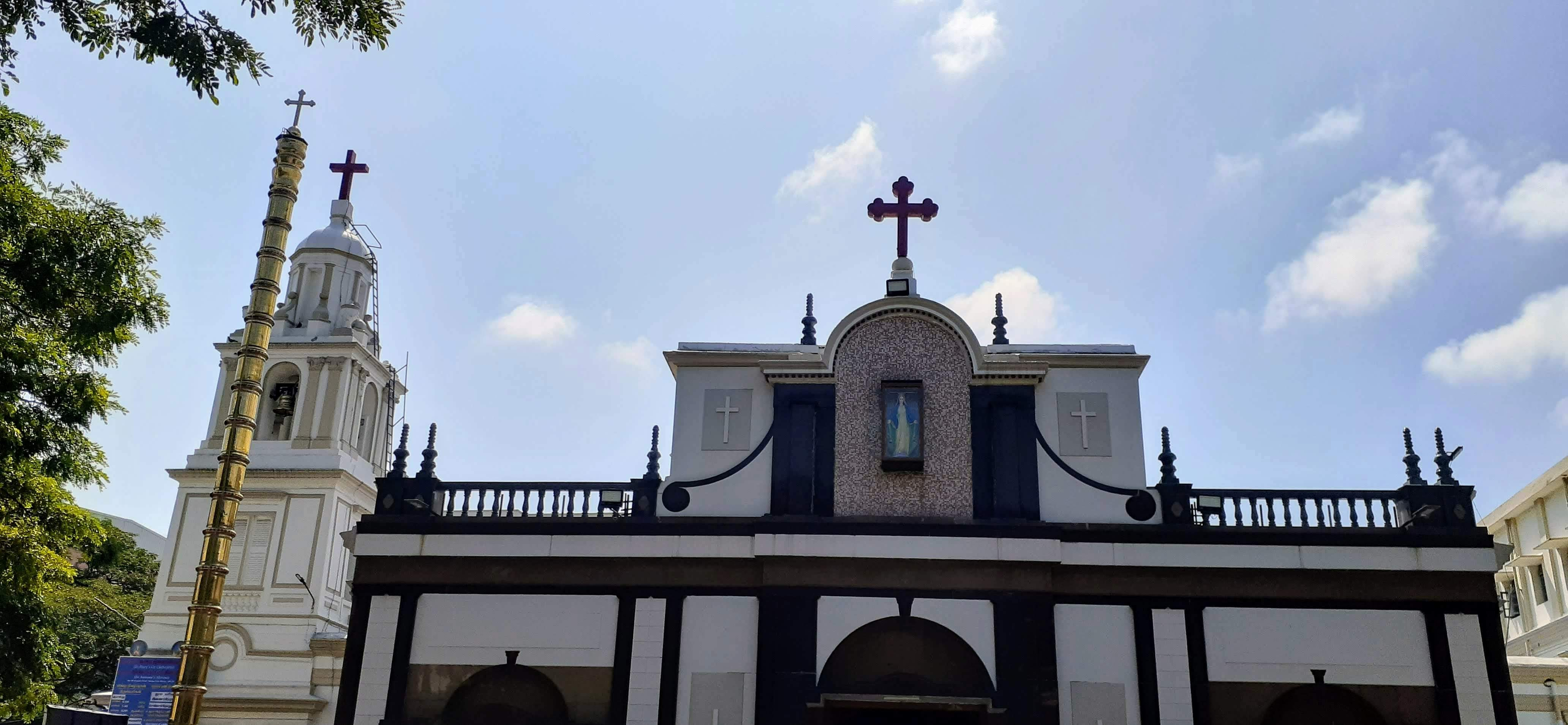
St. Mary's Co-cathedral in Chennai

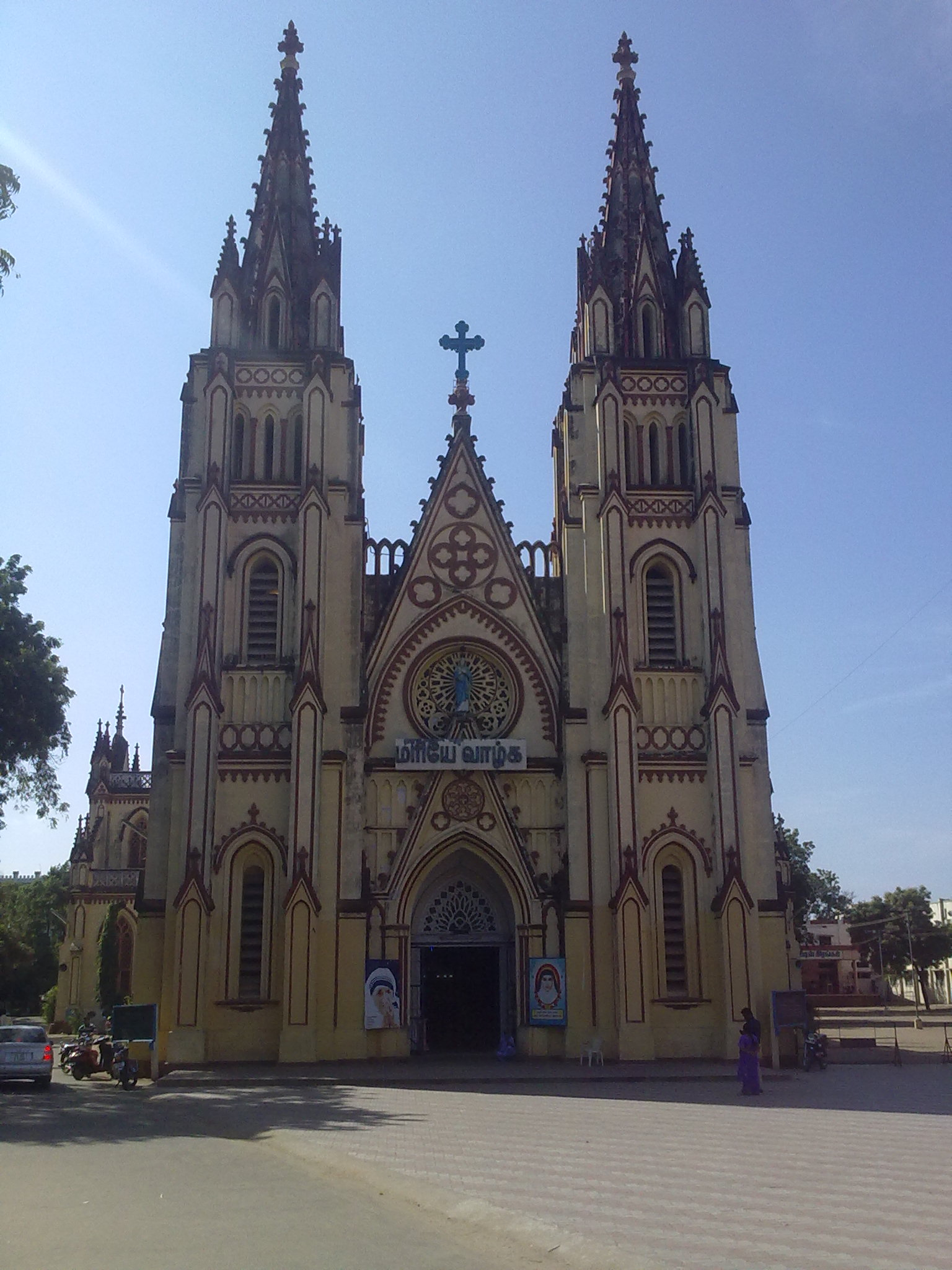
St. Mary's Cathedral in Madurai

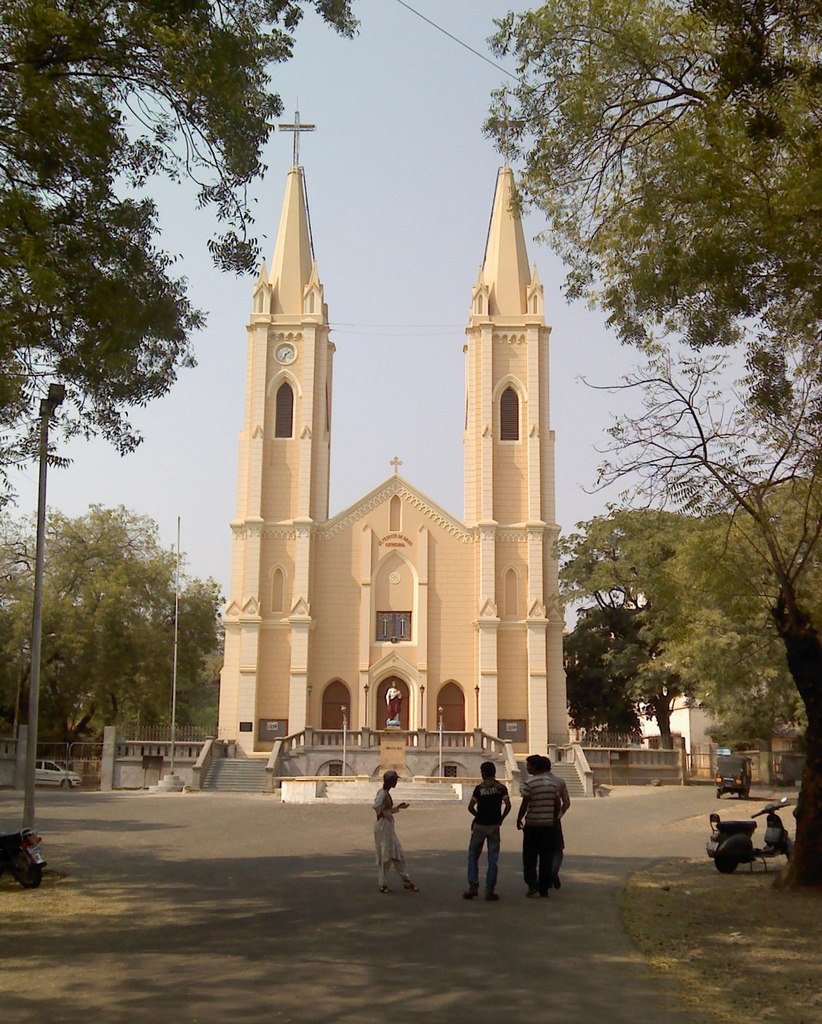
St. Francis de Sales Cathedral in Nagpur

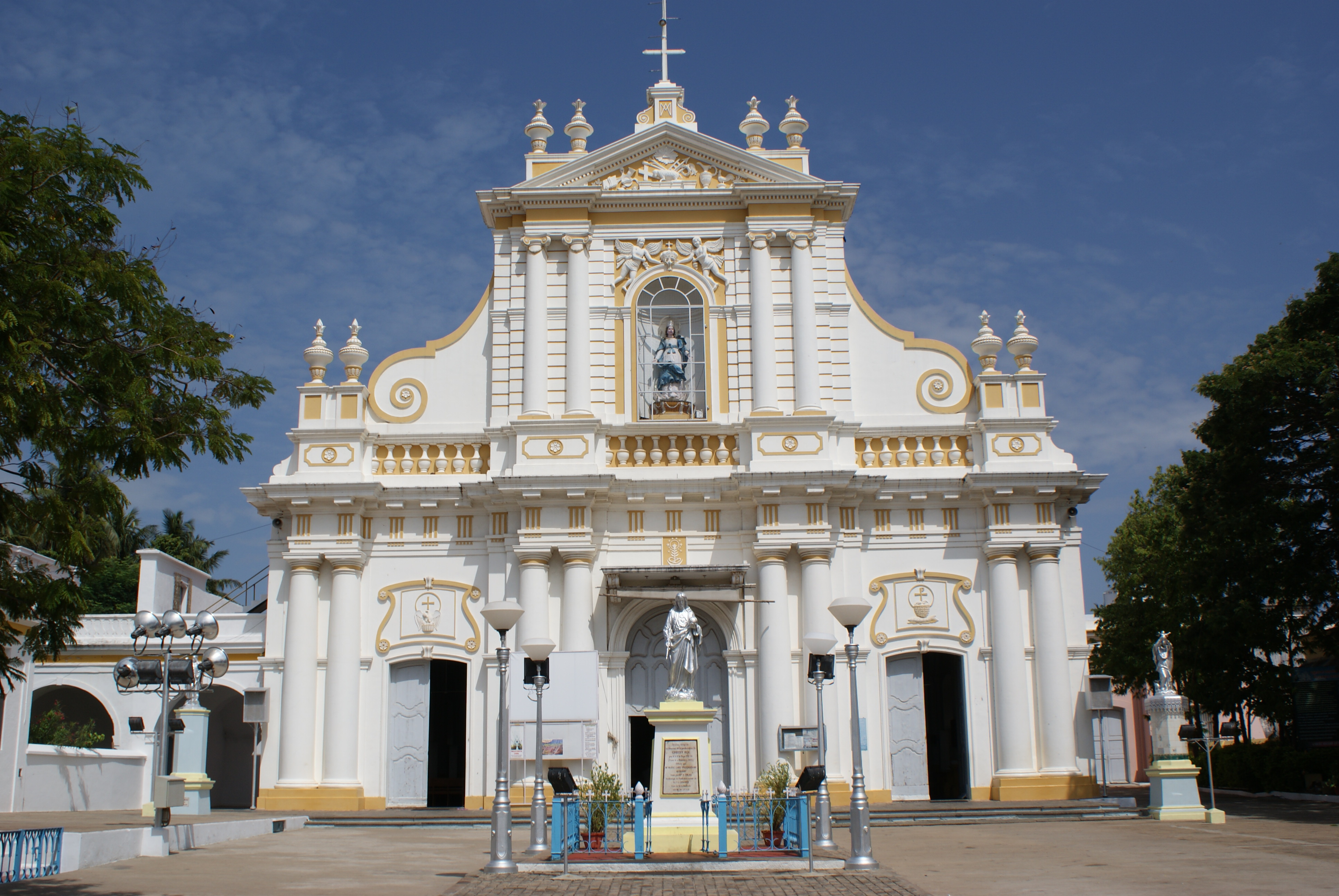
Immaculate Conception Cathedral in Pondicherry

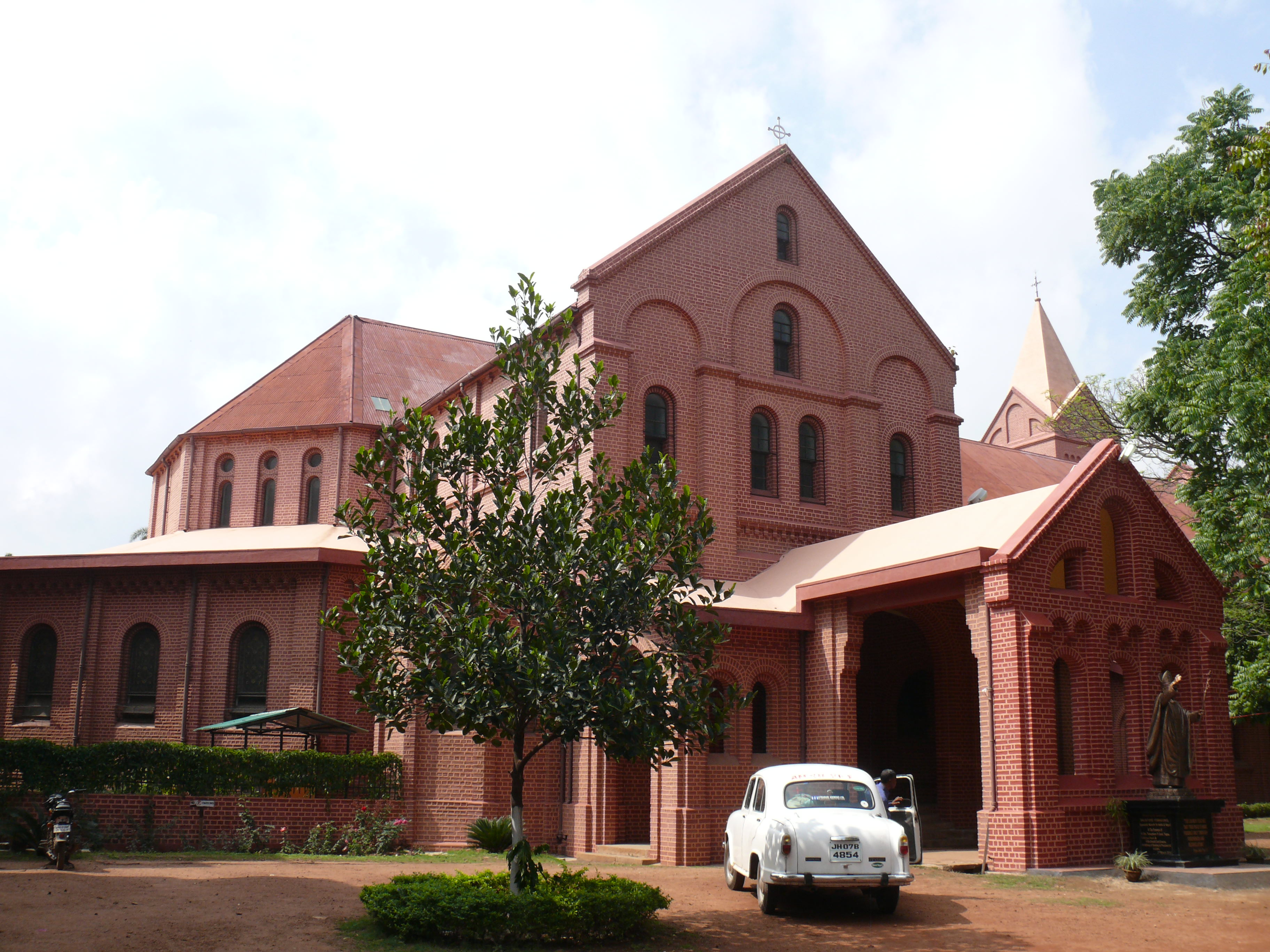
St. Mary's Cathedral in Ranchi

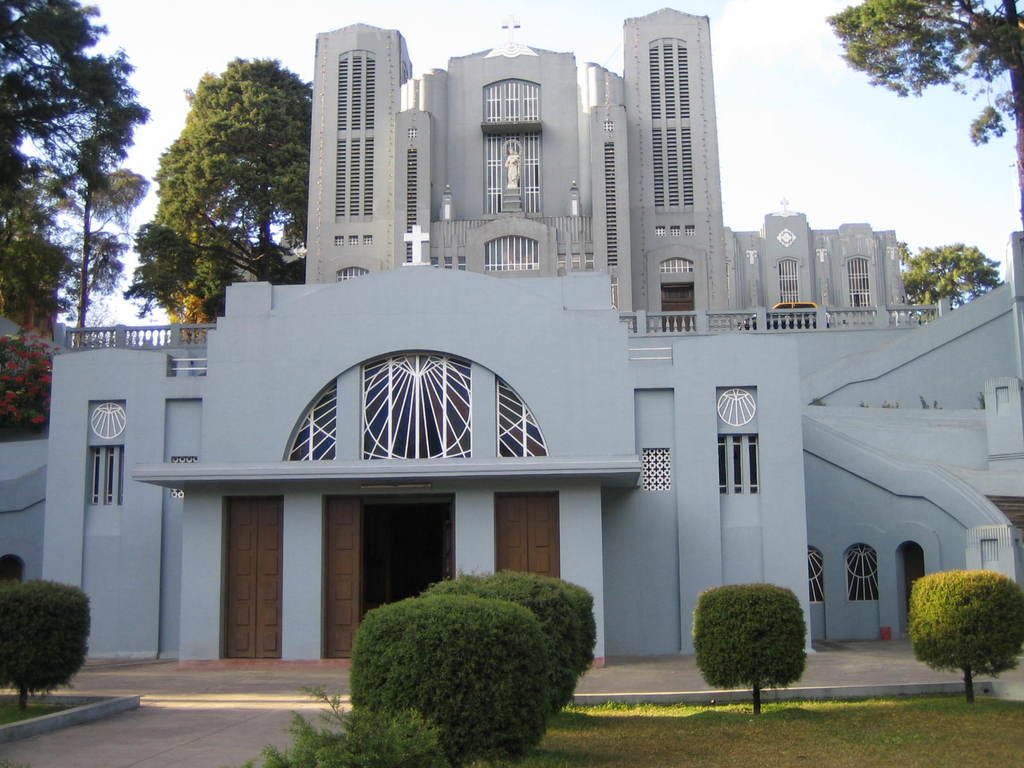
Cathedral of Mary Help of Christians in Shillong

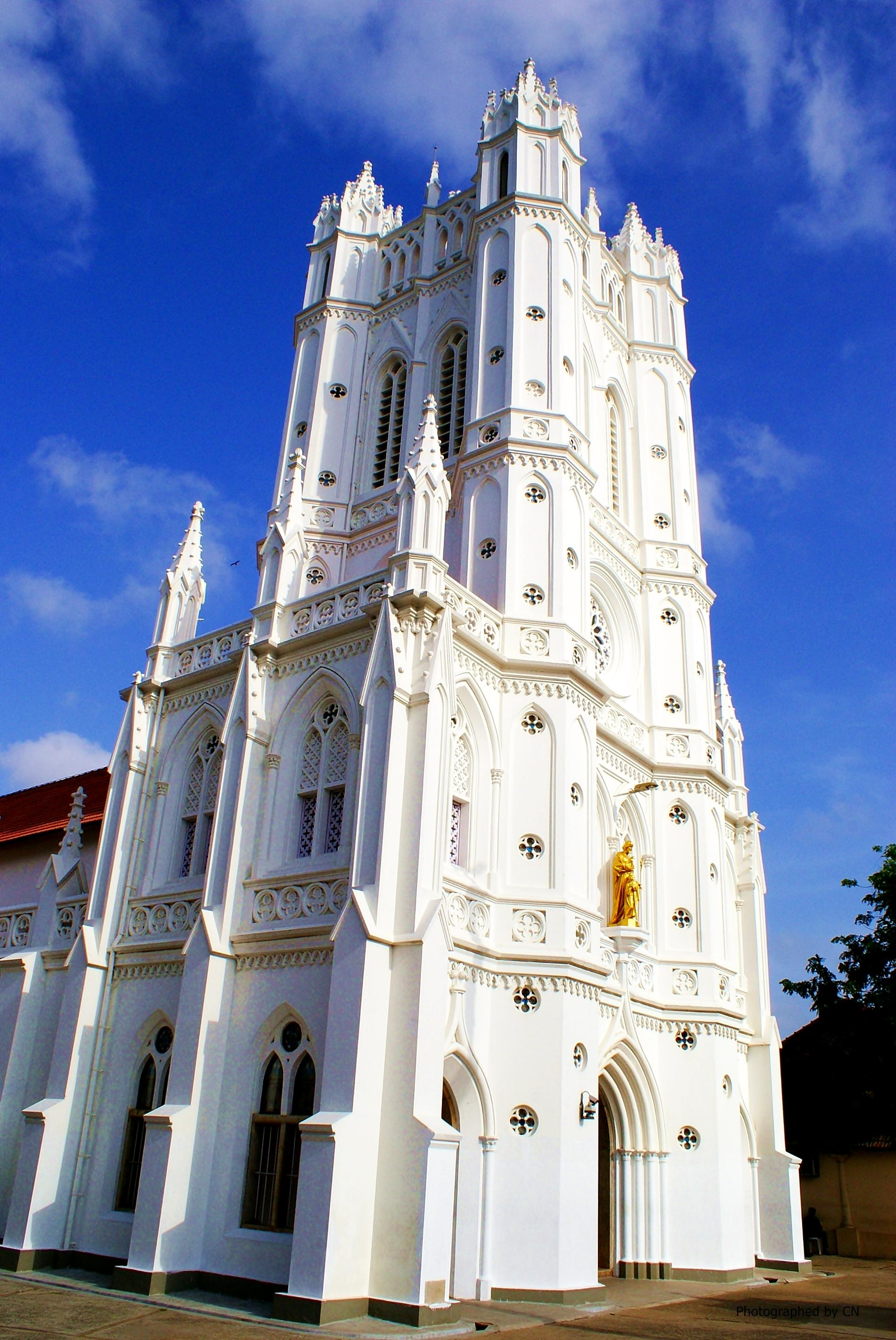
St. Joseph's Cathedral in Trivandrum

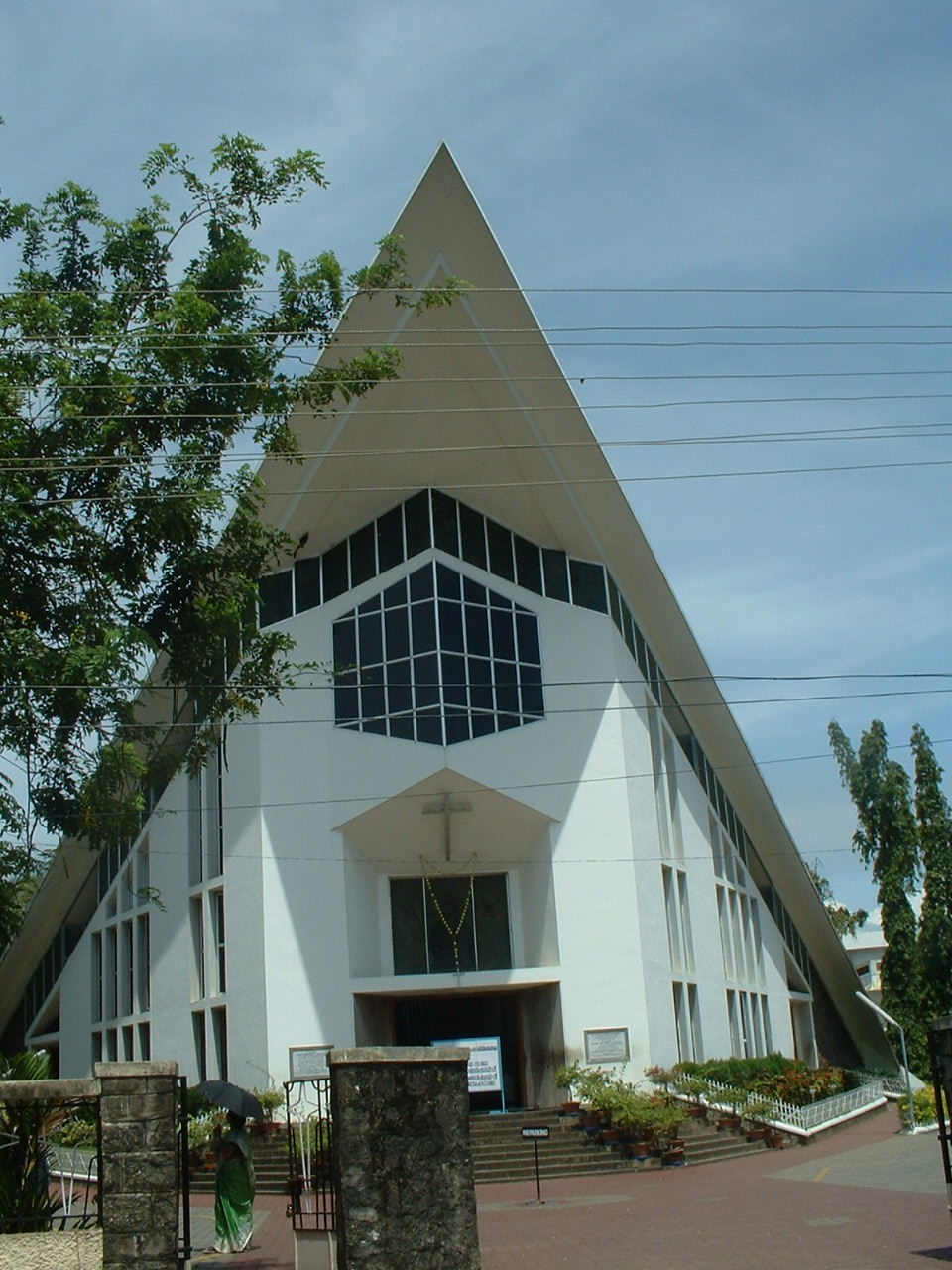
St. Francis Assisi Cathedral of Verapoly

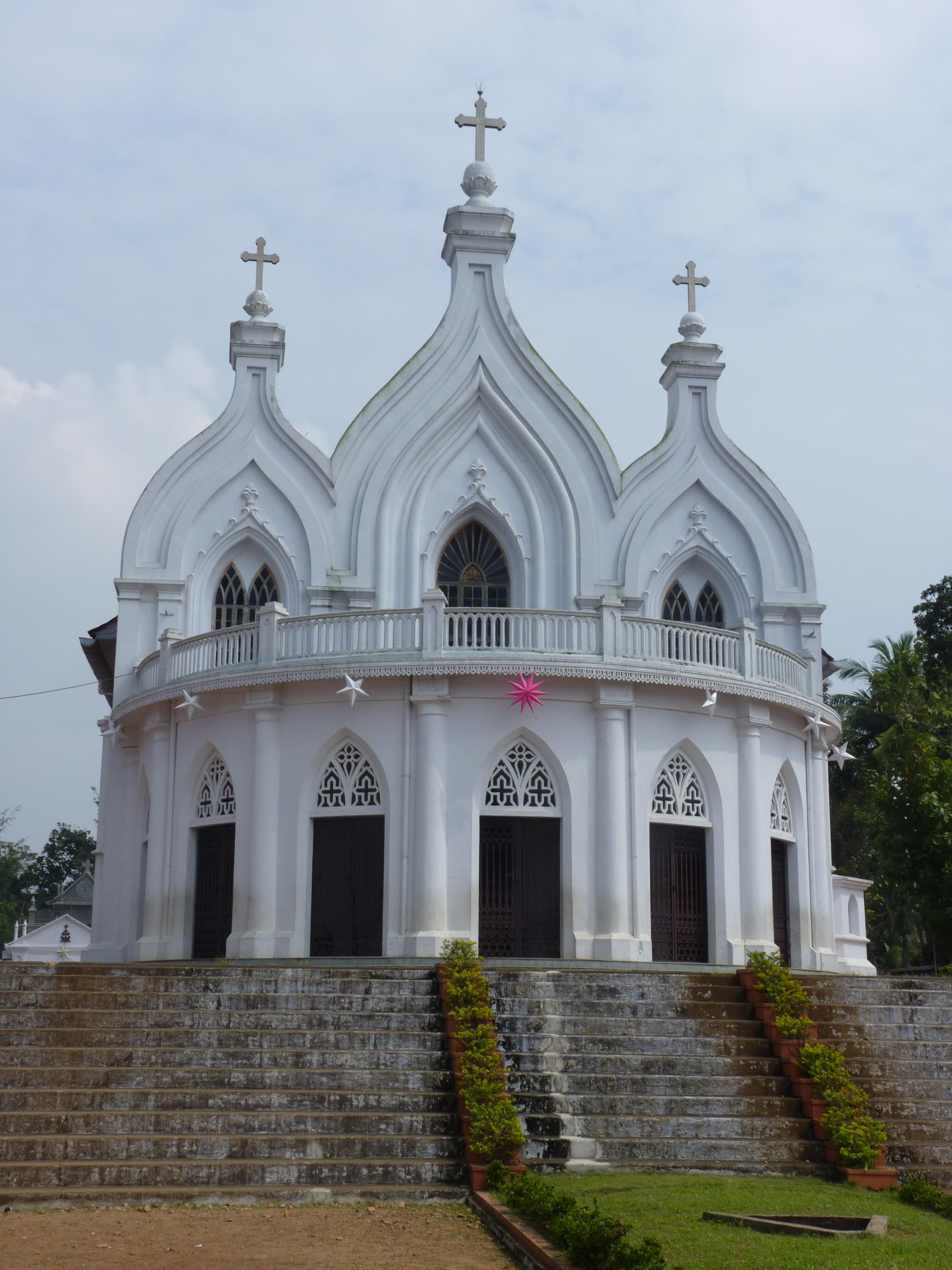
St Mary's Metropolitan Cathedral in Changanassery

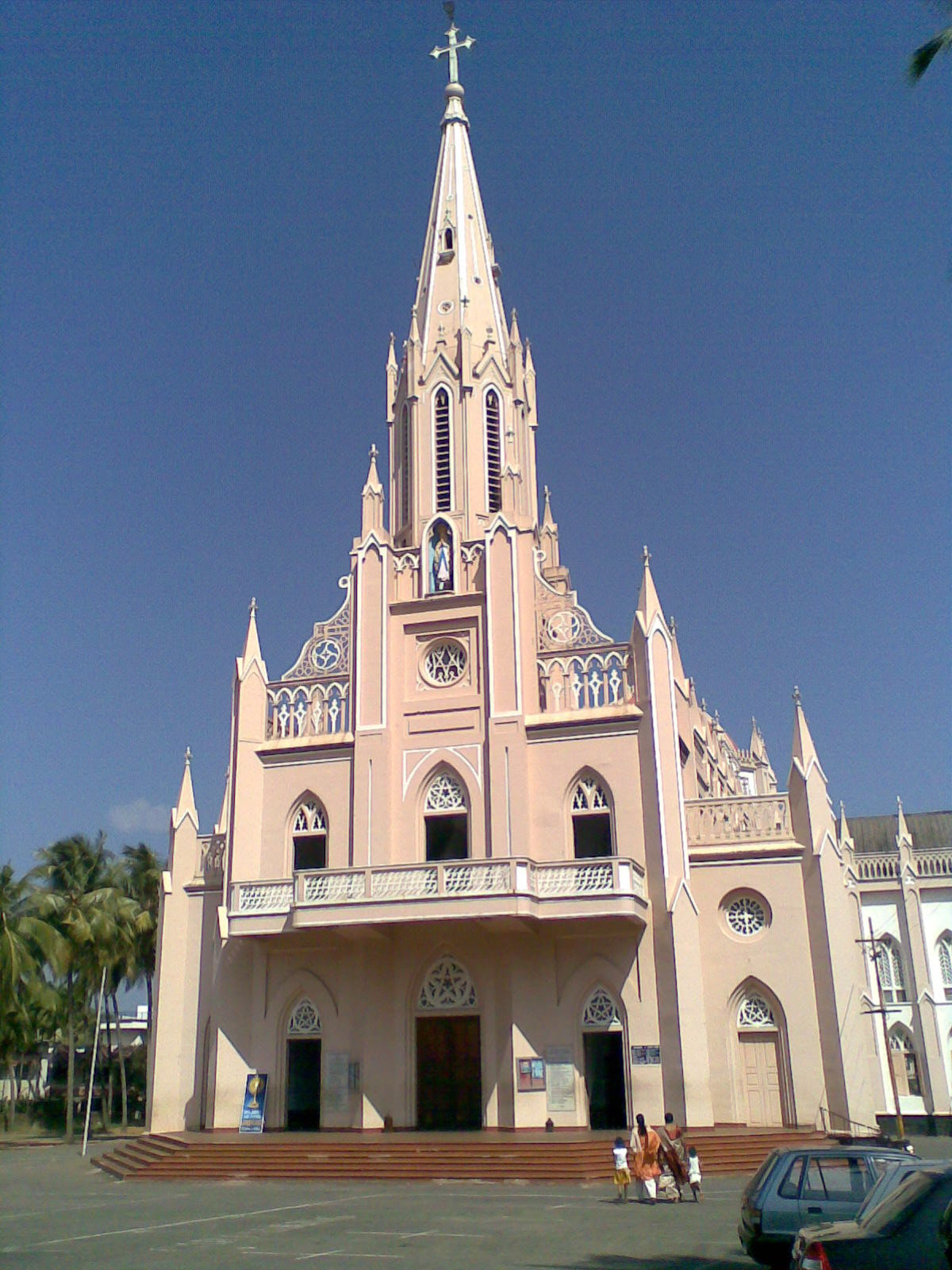
Our Lady of Lourdes Cathedral in Thrissur

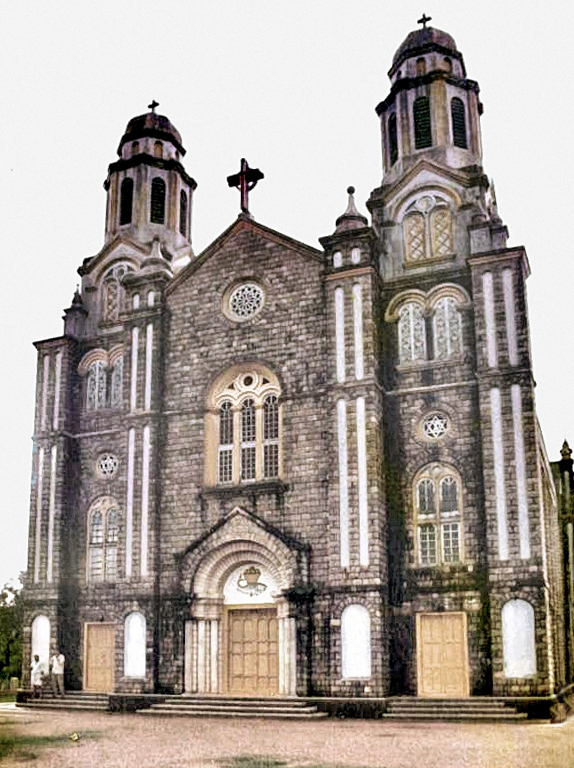
St. Mary's Cathedral in Trivandrum

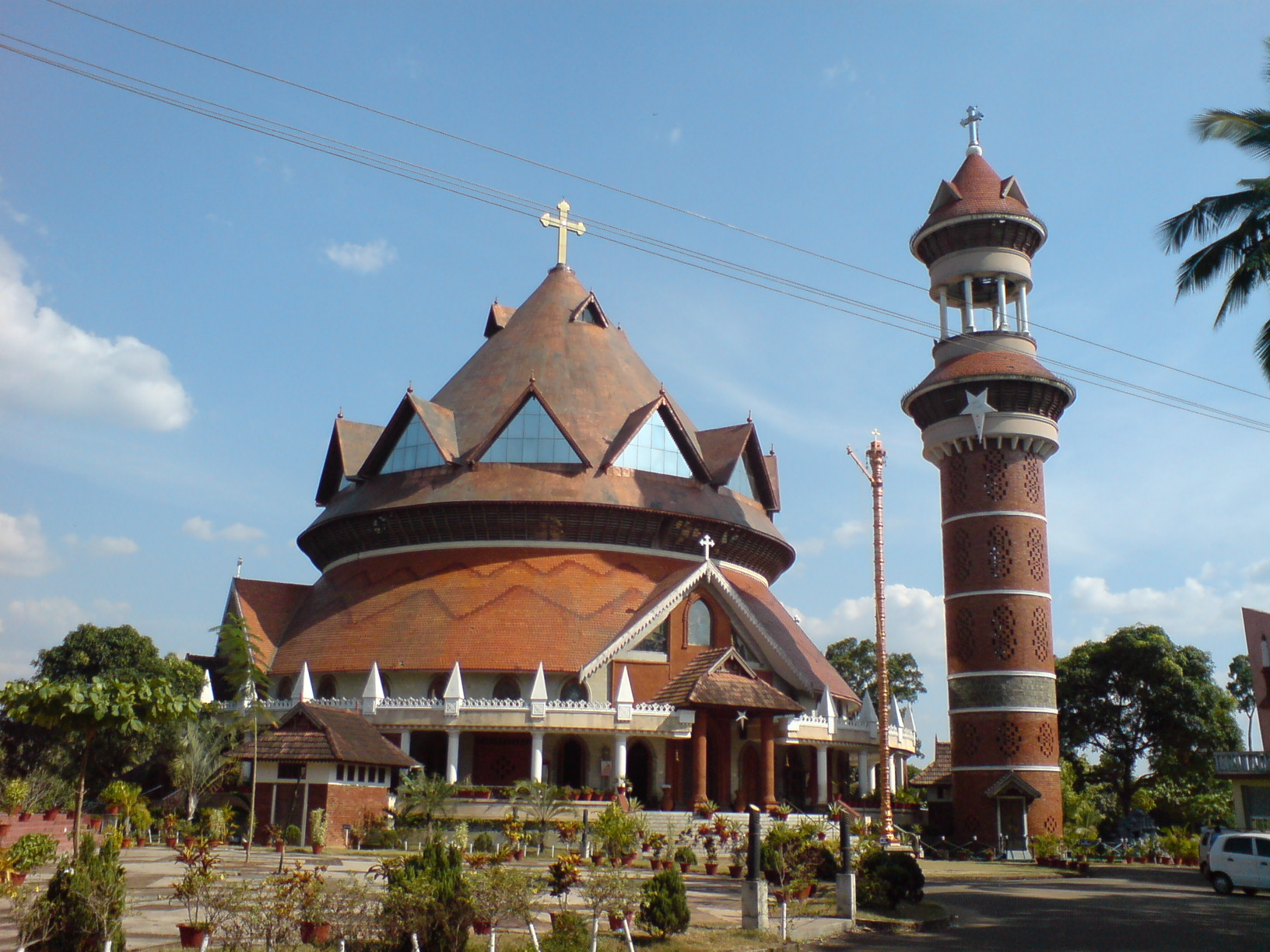
St. John's Cathedral in Tiruvalla

Cathedrals of the Catholic Church in India:

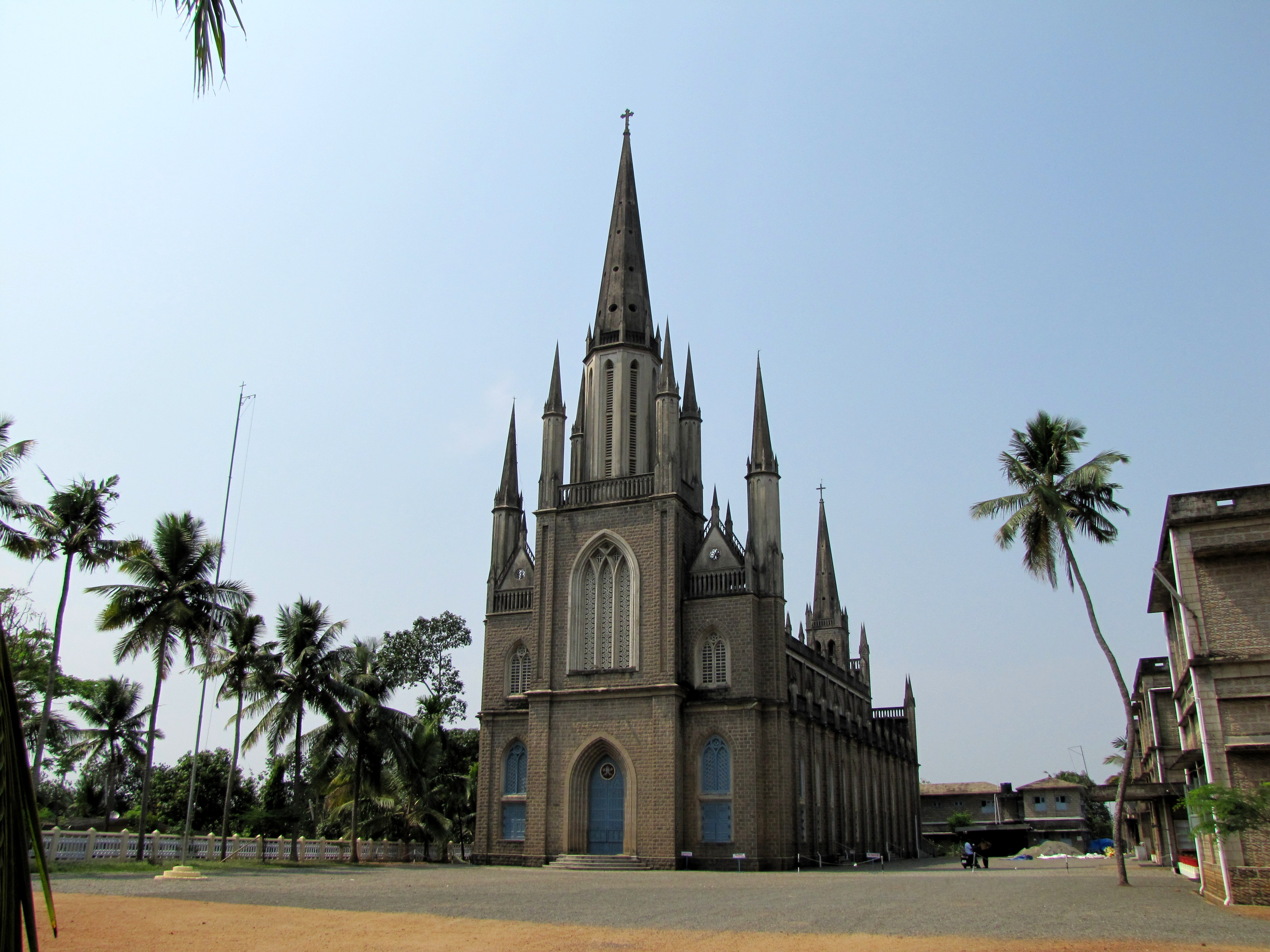
Immaculate Heart of Mary Cathedral in Kottayam

=== Latin Catholic Provinces ===
==== Ecclesiastical Province of Agra ====
- Cathedral of the Immaculate Conception of the Archdiocese of Agra
  - Akbar's Church, former cathedral of the Archdiocese of Agra
  - Cathedral of the Immaculate Conception of the Diocese of Ajmer
  - St. Joseph's Cathedral of the Diocese of Allahabad
  - Cathedral of St. Alphonsus de Ligouri of the Diocese of Bareilly
  - Cathedral of Our Lady of the Annunciation of the Diocese of Jaipur
  - Cathedral of St. Anthony of the Diocese of Jhansi
  - St. Joseph's Cathedral of the Diocese of Lucknow
  - St. Joseph's Cathedral of the Diocese of Meerut
  - Our Lady of Fátima Cathedral of the Diocese of Udaipur
  - St. Mary's Cathedral of the Diocese of Varanasi

==== Ecclesiastical Province of Bangalore ====
- St. Francis Xavier's Cathedral of the Archdiocese of Bangalore
  - St. Patricks's Church, former cathedral of the Archdiocese of Bangalore
  - Cathedral of Our Lady of the Family Rosary of Fátima of the Diocese of Belgaum
  - St. Antony's Cathedral of the Diocese of Bellary
  - St. Joseph's Cathedral of the Diocese of Chikmagalur
  - Cathedral of Mother Mary of Divine Grace of the Diocese of Gulbarga
  - Cathedral of the Assumption of Our Lady of the Diocese of Karwar
  - Our Lady of Rosary of Mangalore of the Diocese of Mangalore
  - Cathedral of St. Joseph and St. Philomena of the Diocese of Mysore
  - Sacred Heart Cathedral of the Diocese of Shimoga
  - Cathedral of Our Lady of the Miracles of the Diocese of Udupi

==== Ecclesiastical Province of Bhopal ====
- St. Francis of Assisi Cathedral of the Archdiocese of Bhopal
  - Cathedral of St. John the Baptist of the Diocese of Gwalior
  - St. Francis of Assisi Cathedral of the Diocese of Indore
  - Sts. Peter and Paul Cathedral of the Diocese of Jabalpur
  - Cathedral of the Annunciation of the Diocese of Jhabua
  - St. Mary's Cathedral of the Diocese of Khandwa

==== Ecclesiastical Province of Bombay ====
- Cathedral of the Holy Name of the Archdiocese of Bombay
  - Cathedral of St. Anne of the Diocese of Nashik
  - St Patrick's Cathedral of the Diocese of Poona
  - Cathedral of Our Lady of Grace of the Diocese of Vasai

==== Ecclesiastical Province of Calcutta ====
- Cathedral of the Most Holy Rosary of the Archdiocese of Calcutta
  - Cathedral of the Sacred Heart of the Diocese of Asansol
  - Cathedral of the Good Shepherd of the Diocese of Bagdogra
  - Cathedral of the Immaculate Heart of Mary and St. Teresa of Calcutta of the Diocese of Baruipur
  - Immaculate Conception Cathedral of the Diocese of Darjeeling
  - Christ Redeemer Cathedral of the Diocese of Jalpaiguri
  - Cathedral of the Holy Redeemer of the Diocese of Krishnagar
  - St. Joseph the Worker Cathedral of the Diocese of Raiganj

==== Ecclesiastical Province of Calicut ====
- Mother of God Cathedral of the Archdiocese of Calicut
  - Cathedral of the Holy Trinity of the Diocese of Kannur
  - San Sebastian Cathedral of the Diocese of Sultanpet

==== Ecclesiastical Province of Cuttack-Bhubaneswar ====
- Cathedral of the Most Holy Rosary in Cuttack of the Archdiocese of Cuttack-Bhubaneswar
  - St. Vincent De Paul Pro-Cathedral of the Archdiocese of Cuttack-Bhubaneswar
  - Christ the King Cathedral of the Diocese of Balasore
  - Queen of the Missions Cathedral of the Diocese of Berhampur
  - Queen of the Mission Cathedral of the Diocese of Rayagada
  - Sacred Heart Cathedral of the Diocese of Rourkela
  - St. Joseph the Worker Cathedral of the Diocese of Sambalpur

==== Ecclesiastical Province of Delhi ====
- Sacred Heart Cathedral, New Delhi of the Archdiocese of Delhi
  - St. Mary's Cathedral in Jammu Cantonment of the Diocese of Jammu-Srinagar
  - Holy Family Catholic Church (Srinagar), former cathedral of the Diocese of Jammu-Srinagar
  - St. Mary's Cathedral of the Diocese of Jalandhar
  - Cathedral of St. Michael and St. Joseph in Shimla of the Diocese of Simla and Chandigarh
  - Christ the King Co-Cathedral in Chandigarh of the Diocese of Simla and Chandigarh

==== Ecclesiastical Province of Gandhinagar ====
- Premavatar Isu Mandir, cathedral of the Archdiocese of Gandhinagar
  - Mount Carmel Cathedral of the Diocese of Ahmedabad
  - Our Lady of the Rosary Cathedral of the Diocese of Baroda

==== Ecclesiastical Province of Goa and Daman ====
- Se Cathedral of the Archdiocese of Goa and Daman
  - Cathedral of Bom Jesus, Daman in Daman former cathedral of the Diocese of Daman, now in the Archdiocese of Goa and Daman
  - Cathedral of Our Lady of Miracles in Sawantwadi of the Diocese of Sindhudurg

==== Ecclesiastical Province of Guwahati ====
- Christ the Bearer of Good News Cathedral of the Archdiocese of Guwahati
  - St. Joseph's Co-Cathedral of the Archdiocese of Guwahati
  - Christ, Light of the World Cathedral of the Diocese of Bongaigaon
  - Cathedral of the Sacred Heart of the Diocese of Dibrugarh
  - Cathedral of the Risen Christ of the Diocese of Diphu
  - Cathedral of St. Joseph of the Diocese of Itanagar
  - Cathedral of Christ the Light of the Diocese of Miao
  - Cathedral of St. John Bosco of the Diocese of Tezpur

==== Ecclesiastical Province of Hyderabad ====
- St Joseph's Cathedral, Hyderabad of the Archdiocese of Hyderabad
  - Basilica of Our Lady of the Assumption, Secunderabad, former cathedral of the Archdiocese of Hyderabad
  - St. Mary's Cathedral of the Diocese of Cuddapah
  - Divine Mercy Cathedral of the Diocese of Khammam
  - St. Joseph's Co-cathedral of the Diocese of Khammam
  - Our Lady of Lourdes Cathedral of the Diocese of Kurnool
  - St. Teresa's Co-Cathedral of the Diocese of Kurnool
  - Mariarani Cathedral (Mary Queen of the Apostles Cathedral) of the Diocese of Nalgonda
  - Our Lady of Fátima Cathedral in Hanamakonda of the Diocese of Warangal

==== Ecclesiastical Province of Imphal ====
- St. Joseph's Cathedral of the Archdiocese of Imphal
  - Mary Help of Christians Cathedral of the Diocese of Kohima

==== Ecclesiastical Province of Madras and Mylapore ====
- San Thome Basilica, cathedral of the Archdiocese of Madras and Mylapore
  - St. Mary of the Angels Co-Cathedral of the Archdiocese of Madras and Mylapore
  - Cathedral of St. Joseph of the Diocese of Chingleput
  - St. Michael's Cathedral of the Diocese of Coimbatore
  - Sacred Heart Cathedral of the Diocese of Ootacamund
  - Assumption Cathedral of the Diocese of Vellore

==== Ecclesiastical Province of Madurai ====
- Cathedral of Our Lady of Dolours (St.Mary's Cathedral) of the Archdiocese of Madurai
  - St. Joseph's Cathedral of the Diocese of Dindigul
  - St. Xavier's Church, Kottar( St. Xavier Cathedral) of the Diocese of Kottar
  - Holy Trinity Cathedral, Thirithuvapuram of the Diocese of Kuzhithurai
  - St. Francis Xavier's Cathedral of the Diocese of Palayamkottai
  - Our lady of Ransom Cathedral(Alangara Annai Cathedral) of the Diocese of Sivagangai
  - St.Mary's Cathedral of the Diocese of Tiruchirapalli
  - Sacred Heart Cathedral of the Diocese of Tuticorin

==== Ecclesiastical Province of Nagpur ====
- St. Francis de Sales Cathedral of the Archdiocese of Nagpur
  - St. Francis Xavier's Cathedral of the Diocese of Amravati
  - St. Francis de Sales Cathedral of the Diocese of Aurangabad

==== Ecclesiastical Province of Patna ====
- Queen of Apostles Cathedral of the Archdiocese of Patna
  - St. Joseph's Pro-Cathedral of the Archdiocese of Patna
  - Padri Ki Haveli former cathedral of the Archdiocese of Patna
  - Cathedral of the Nativity of the Blessed Virgin Mary of the Diocese of Bettiah
  - Immaculate Conception Cathedral of the Diocese of Bhagalpur
  - Cathedral of Mary Mother of Perpetual Help of the Diocese of Buxar
  - Cathedral of St. Francis Assisi of the Diocese of Muzaffarpur
  - St. Peter's Cathedral of the Diocese of Purnea

==== Ecclesiastical Province of Pondicherry and Cuddalore ====
- Immaculate Conception Cathedral, Pondicherry of the Archdiocese of Pondicherry and Cuddalore
  - Sacred Heart Cathedral of the Diocese of Dharmapuri
  - Our lady of Ransom Cathedral ( St.Mary's Cathedral ) of the Diocese of Kumbakonam
  - Infant Jesus Cathedral of the Diocese of Salem
  - St. Mary's Co-Cathedral in Shevapet of the Diocese of Salem
  - Sacred Heart Cathedral of the Diocese of Tanjore

==== Ecclesiastical Province of Raipur ====
- St. Joseph's Cathedral of the Archdiocese of Raipur
  - Cathedral of the Immaculate Mother of God of the Diocese of Ambikapur
  - Cathedral of Our Lady of the Rosary in Kunkuri of the Diocese of Jashpur
  - Cathedral of St. Michael of the Diocese of Raigarh

==== Ecclesiastical Province of Ranchi ====
- St Mary's Immaculate Conception Cathedral of the Archdiocese of Ranchi
  - Shanti ki Maharani Church, cathedral of the Diocese of Daltonganj
  - Cathedral of St. Paul of the Diocese of Dumka
  - St. Patrick's Cathedral of the Diocese of Gumla
  - Cathedral of the Resurrection of the Diocese of Hazaribag
  - St. Joseph's Cathedral of the Diocese of Jamshedpur
  - Cathedral of St. Michael of the Diocese of Khunti
  - Stella Maris Cathedral of the Diocese of Port Blair
  - St. Anne Cathedral of the Diocese of Simdega

==== Ecclesiastical Province of Shillong ====
- Cathedral of Mary Help of Christians of the Archdiocese of Shillong
  - Cathedral of St. Francis Xavier of the Diocese of Agartala
  - Church of Shantir Rani, former cathedral of the Diocese of Agartala
  - Christ the King Cathedral of the Diocese of Aizawl
  - Church of the Holy Cross, former cathedral of the Diocese of Silchar, now in the Diocese of Aizawl
  - Cathedral of St. Theresa of Lisieux of the Diocese of Jowai
  - Cathedral of St. Peter the Apostle of the Diocese of Nongstoin
  - Cathedral of Mary Help of Christians of the Diocese of Tura

==== Ecclesiastical Province of Thiruvananthapuram ====
- St. Joseph's Cathedral of the Archdiocese of Thiruvananthapuram
  - Mount Carmel Cathedral in Alappuzha of the Diocese of Alleppey
  - Immaculate Conception Cathedral of the Diocese of Neyyattinkara
  - St. Mary's Cathedral, Punalur of the Diocese of Punalur
  - Infant Jesus Cathedral in Tangasseri of the Diocese of Quilon
  - Immaculate Conception Cathedral in Pullichira, former cathedral of the Diocese of Quilon

==== Ecclesiastical Province of Verapoly ====
- St. Francis Assisi Cathedral, Ernakulam of the Archdiocese of Verapoly
  - Varapuzha Basilica, former cathedral of the Archdiocese of Verapoly
  - Santa Cruz Basilica of the Diocese of Cochin
  - St. Michael's Cathedral in Kodungallur (Cranganore) of the Diocese of Kottapuram
  - Immaculate Heart of Mary Cathedral in Kottayam of the Diocese of Vijayapuram

==== Ecclesiastical Province of Visakhapatnam ====
- St. Peter's Cathedral of the Archdiocese of Visakhapatnam
  - St. Anne's Co-Cathedral of the Archdiocese of Visakhapatnam
  - Amalodbhavi Cathedral of the Diocese of Eluru
  - Bala Yesu Cathedral in Phirangipuram of the Diocese of Guntur
  - St. Joseph's Cathedral of the Diocese of Nellore
  - Cathedral of Our Lady of Mercy of the Diocese of Srikakulam
  - St. Paul's Cathedral of the Diocese of Vijayawada
  - St. Peter's Co-Cathedral of the Diocese of Vijayawada

=== Syro-Malabar Ecclesiastical Provinces ===
==== Province of Eranakulam - Angamaly ====
- St. Mary's Metropolitan Cathedral Basilica of the Archeparchy of Ernakulam–Angamaly
  - Mar Hormizd Co-Cathedral of the Archeparchy of Ernakulam–Angamaly
  - St. George's Cathedral of the Eparchy of Idukki
  - St. George's Cathedral of the Eparchy of Kothamangalam

==== Province of Changanassery ====
- St Mary's Metropolitan Cathedral of the Archeparchy of Changanacherry
  - St. Dominic's Cathedral of the Eparchy of Kanjirappally
  - St. Thomas' Cathedral of the Eparchy of Palai
  - St. Joseph's Cathedral, Soosaipuram (under construction) of the Eparchy of Thuckalay

==== Province of Faridabad ====
- Kristuraja Metropolitan Cathedral of the Archeparchy of Faridabad
  - St Joseph's Cathedral of the Eparchy of Bijnor
  - St. Joseph's Cathedral of the Eparchy of Gorakhpur

==== Province of Kalyan ====
- St. Thomas' Metropolitan Cathedral of the Archeparchy of Kalyan
  - St. Thomas' Cathedral of the Eparchy of Chanda
  - Cathedral of the Sacred Heart (Prem Mandir) of the Eparchy of Rajkot

==== Province of Shamshabad ====
- St. Alphonsa's Metropolitan Cathedral of the Archeparchy of Shamshabad
  - Cathedral of the Holy Family of the Eparchy of Adilabad

==== Province of Tellicherry ====
- St. Joseph's Metropolitan Cathedral of the Archeparchy of Tellicherry
  - St. Lawrence's Cathedral of the Eparchy of Belthangady
  - Cathedral of the Little Flower of the Eparchy of Bhadravathi
  - St Joseph's Cathedral of the Eparchy of Mananthavady
  - Cathedral of the Infant Jesus of the Eparchy of Mandya
  - Mary Matha Cathedral of the Eparchy of Thamarassery

==== Province of Thrissur ====
- Metropolitan Cathedral of Our Lady of Lourdes of the Archeparchy of Thrissur
  - St. Antony's Cathedral of the Eparchy of Hosur
  - St Thomas Cathedral of the Eparchy of Irinjalakuda
    - St. Mary's Forane Church, Puthenchira, former cathedral of the Eparchy of Irinjalakuda
  - St Raphael's Cathedral of the Eparchy of Palghat
  - Cathedral of the Holy Trinity of the Eparchy of Ramanathapuram

==== Province of Ujjain ====
- St. Mary's Metropolitan Cathedral of the Archeparchy of Ujjain
  - St. Joseph's Cathedral of the Eparchy of Jagdalpur
  - St. Theresa's Cathedral of the Eparchy of Sagar
  - St. Vincent's Cathedral of the Eparchy of Satna

==== Archdiocese of Kottayam ====
- Cathedral of Christ the King of the Archeparchy of Kottayam
  - St. George's Forane Church, Edacatt, former cathedral of the Archeparchy of Kottayam

=== Syro-Malankara Ecclesiastical Provinces ===
==== Province of Trivandrum ====
- St. Mary's Cathedral, Pattom, Trivandrum of the Syro-Malankara Major Archeparchy of Trivandrum
  - St. Mary, Queen of Peace Basilica, former cathedral of the Syro-Malankara Major Archeparchy of Trivandrum
  - St. Mary's Cathedral of the Syro-Malankara Catholic Eparchy of St. Ephrem of Khadki
  - Christuraja Cathedral of the Syro-Malankara Eparchy of Marthandom
  - St. Mary's Cathedral of the Syro-Malankara Eparchy of Mavelikara
  - St. Mary's Cathedral of the Syro-Malankara Eparchy of Parassala
  - St. Peter's Cathedral of the Syro-Malankara Eparchy of Pathanamthitta

==== Province of Tiruvalla ====
- St. John's Cathedral of the Syro-Malankara Archdiocese of Tiruvalla
  - St. Joseph's Cathedral of the Syro-Malankara Eparchy of Muvattupuzha
  - St. Thomas Cathedral in Sulthan Bathery of the Syro-Malankara Diocese of Bathery
  - St. Mary's Pro-Cathedral, Noojibalthila of the Syro-Malankara Eparchy of Puthur

==== Directly under the Holy See ====
- St. Mary's Cathedral of the Syro-Malankara Catholic Eparchy of St. John Chrysostom of Gurgaon

=== Gallery ===
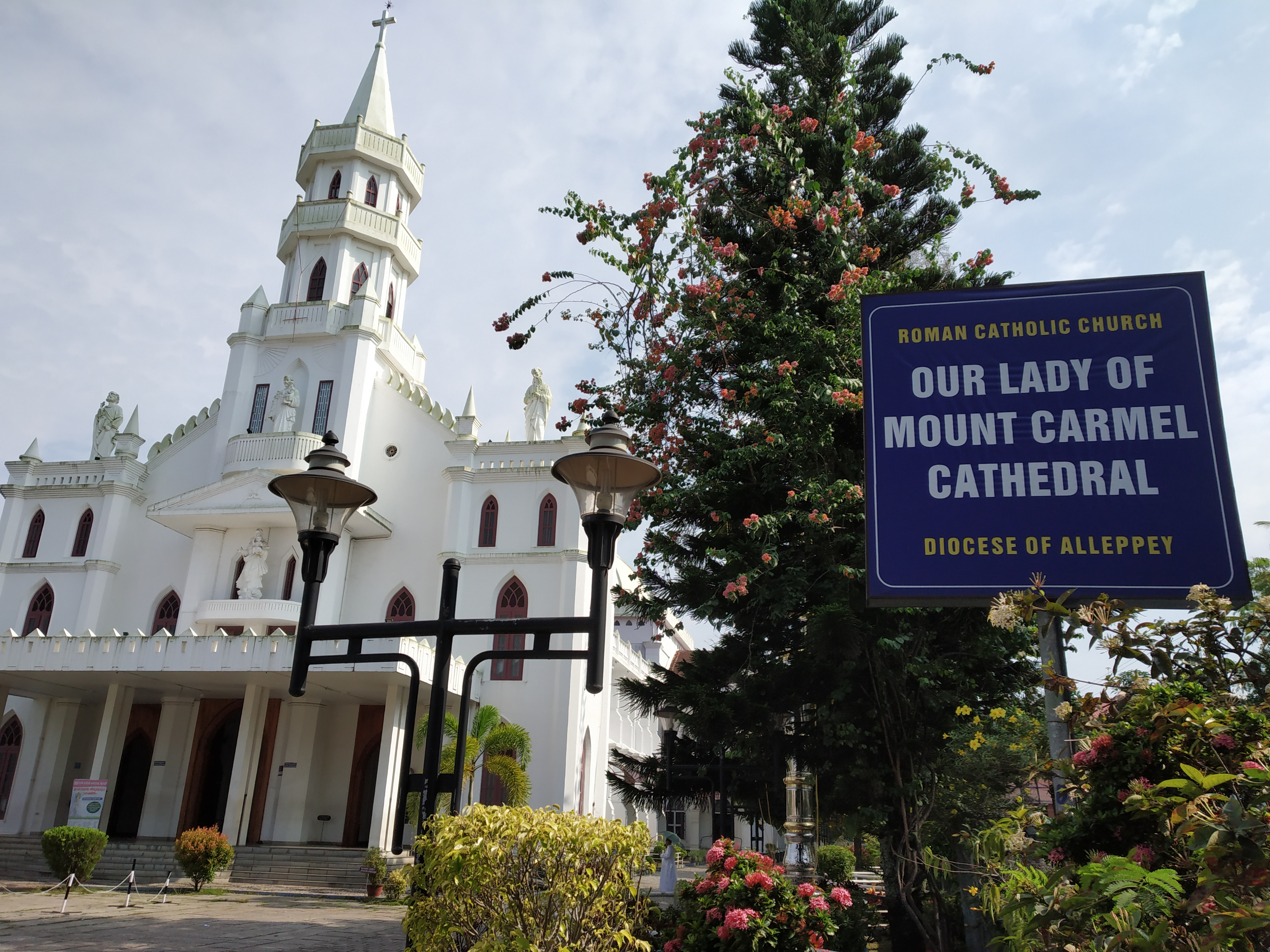
Our Lady of Mount Carmel Cathedral in Alapuzha

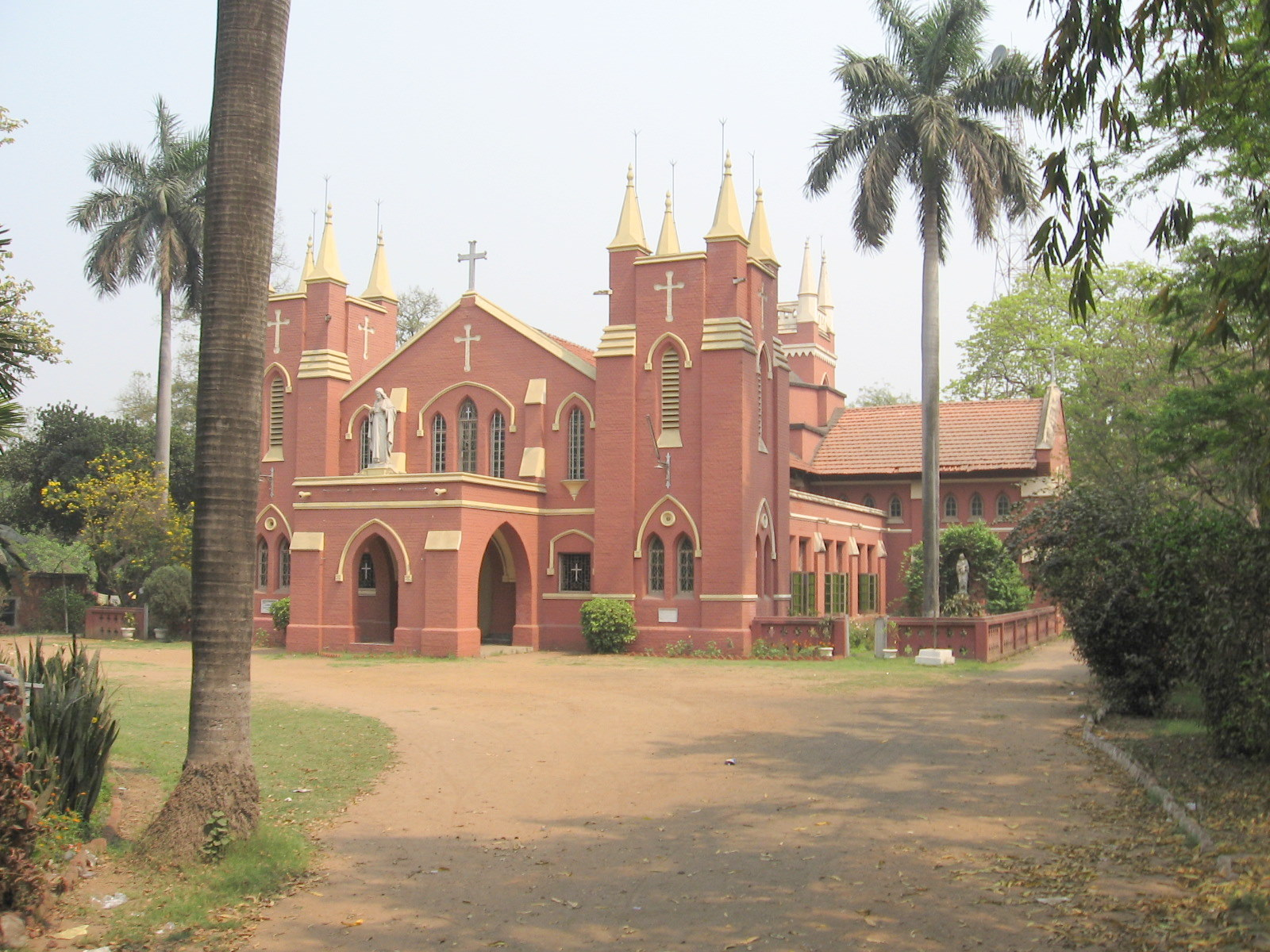
Cathedral of the Sacred Heart in Asansol

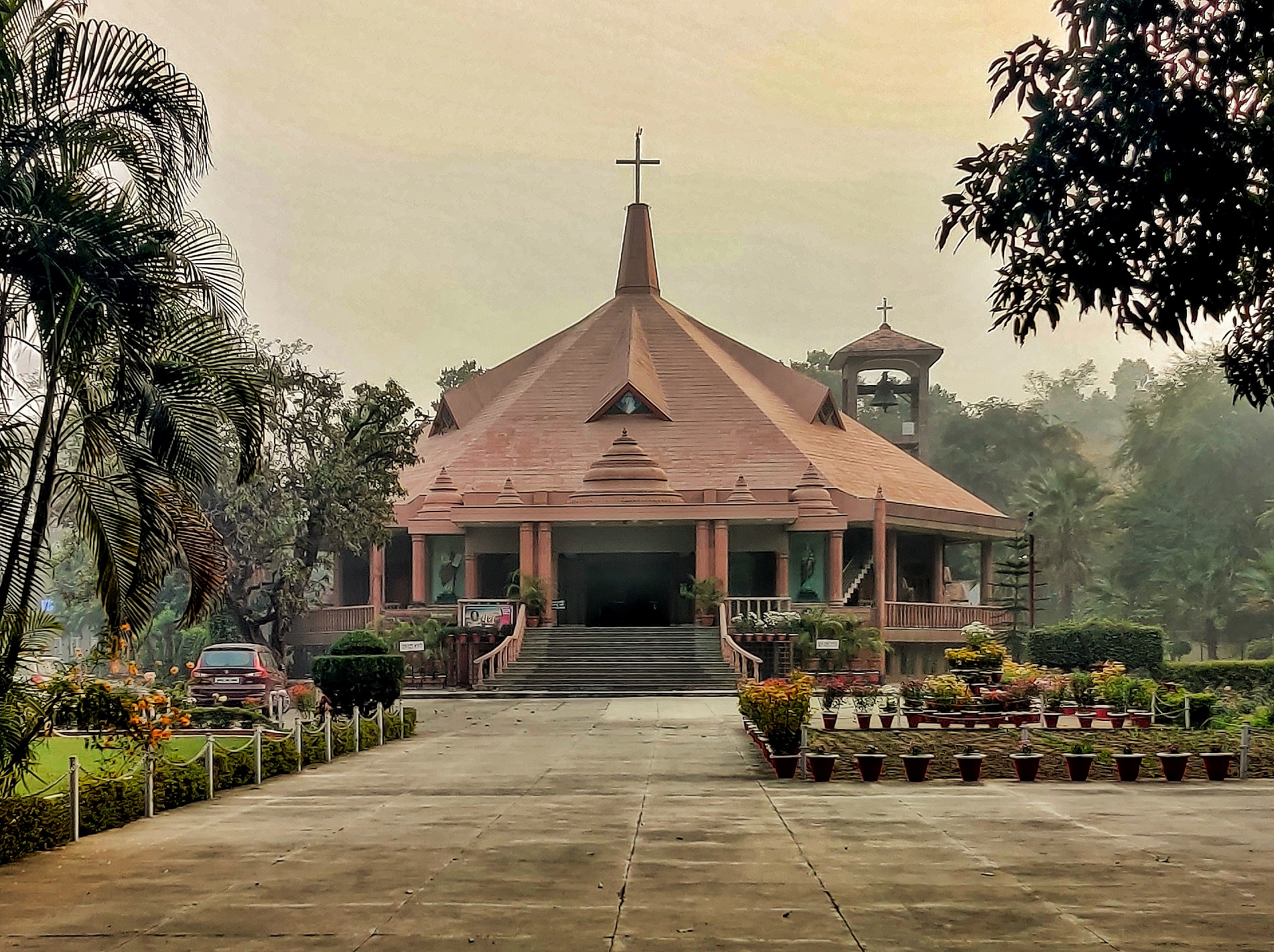
Cathedral of St. Alphonsus de Ligouri in Bareilly

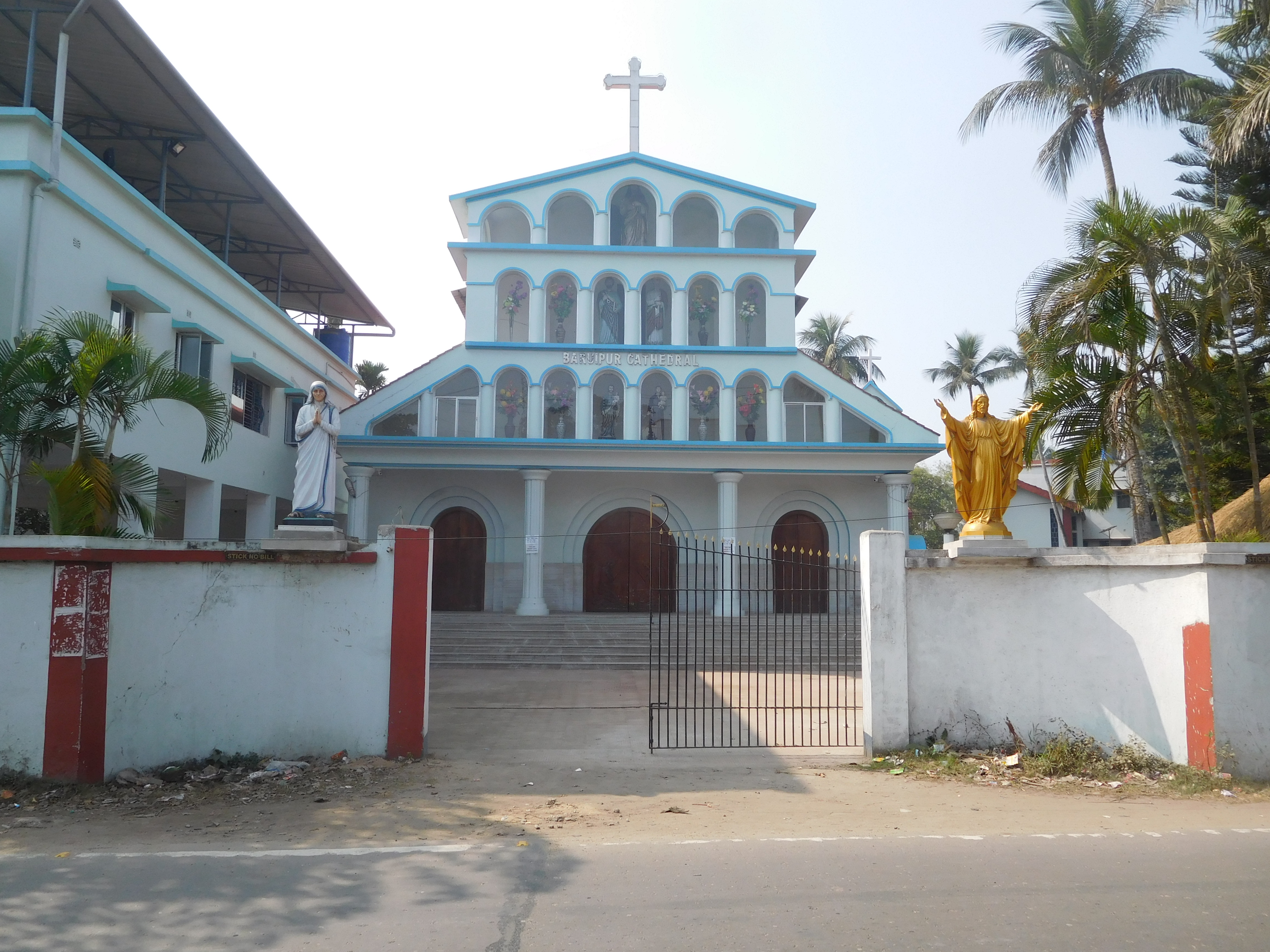
Cathedral of the Immaculate Heart of Mary and St. Teresa of Calcutta in Baruipur

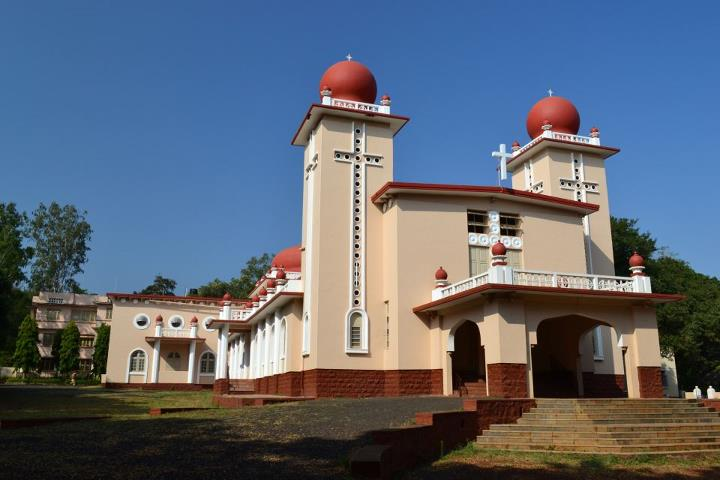
Cathedral of Our Lady of the Family Rosary of Fátima in Belgaum

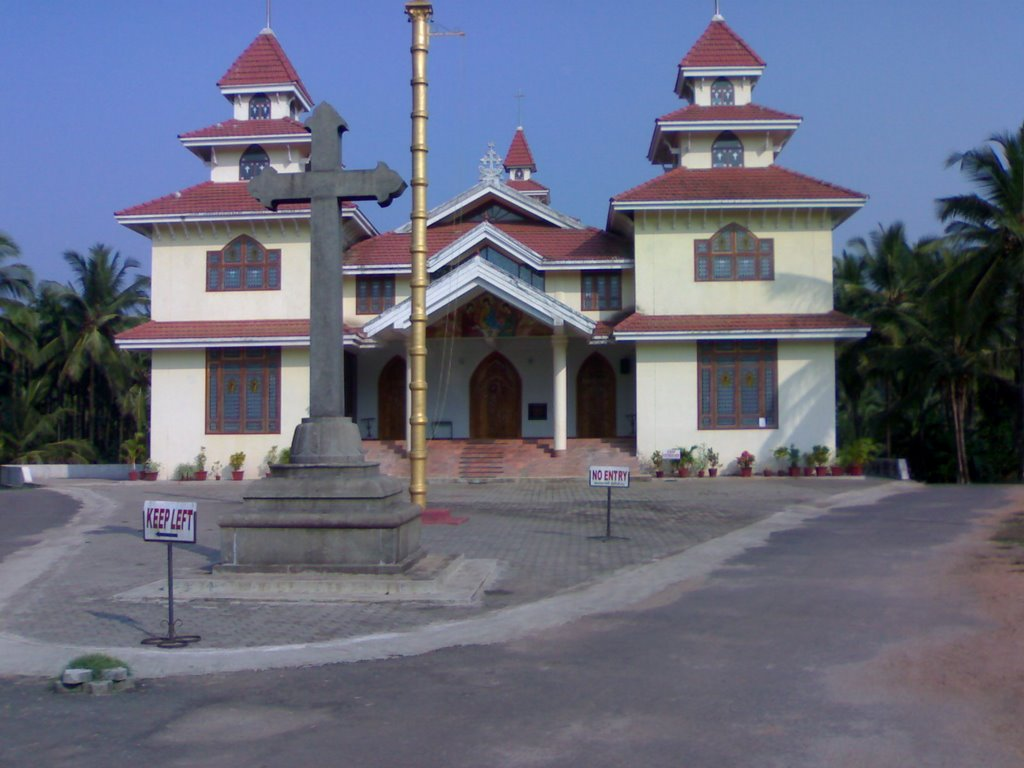
St. Lawrence Cathedral in Belthangady

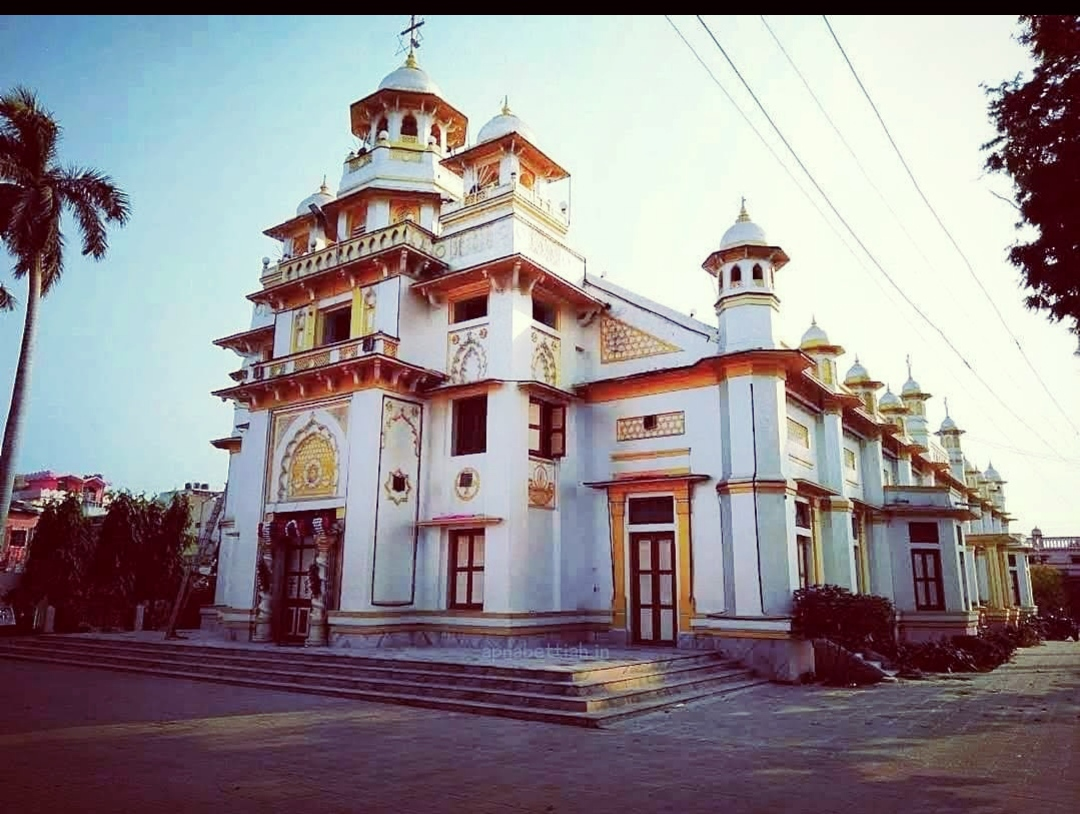
Cathedral of the Nativity of the Blessed Virgin Mary in Bettiah

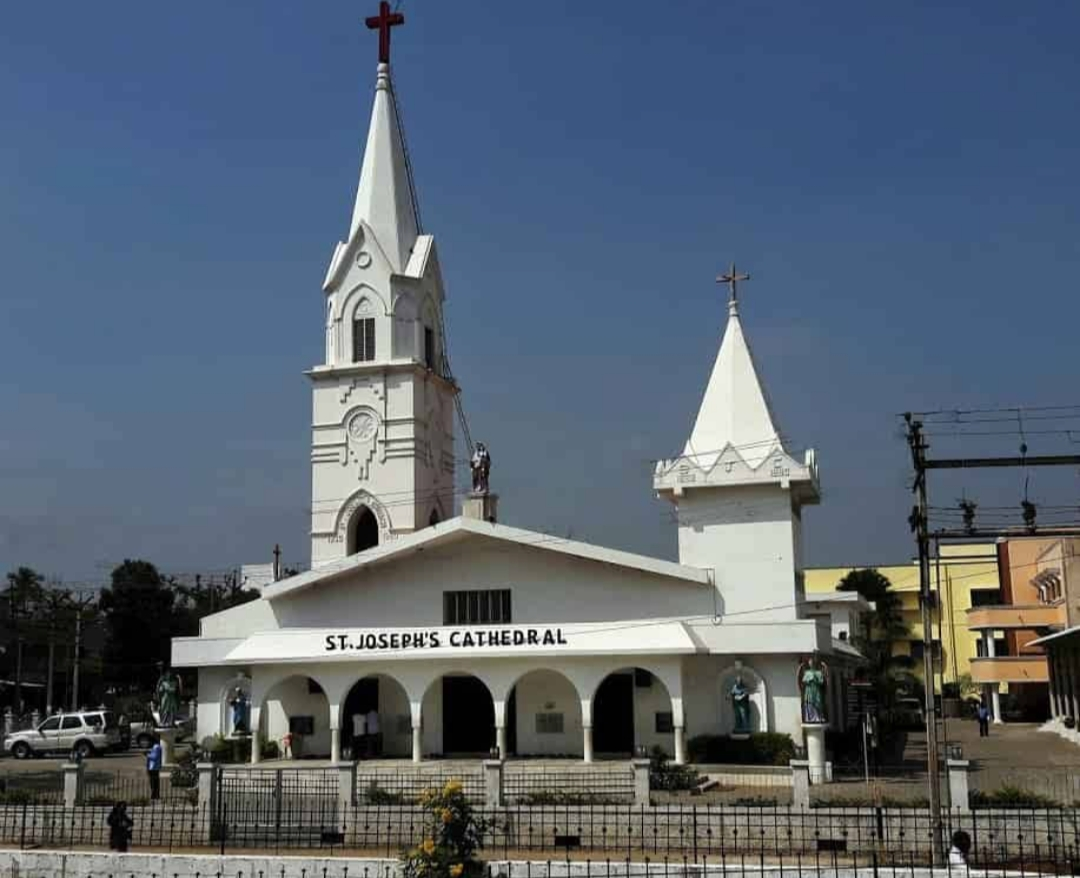
St. Joseph's Cathedral in Chingleput

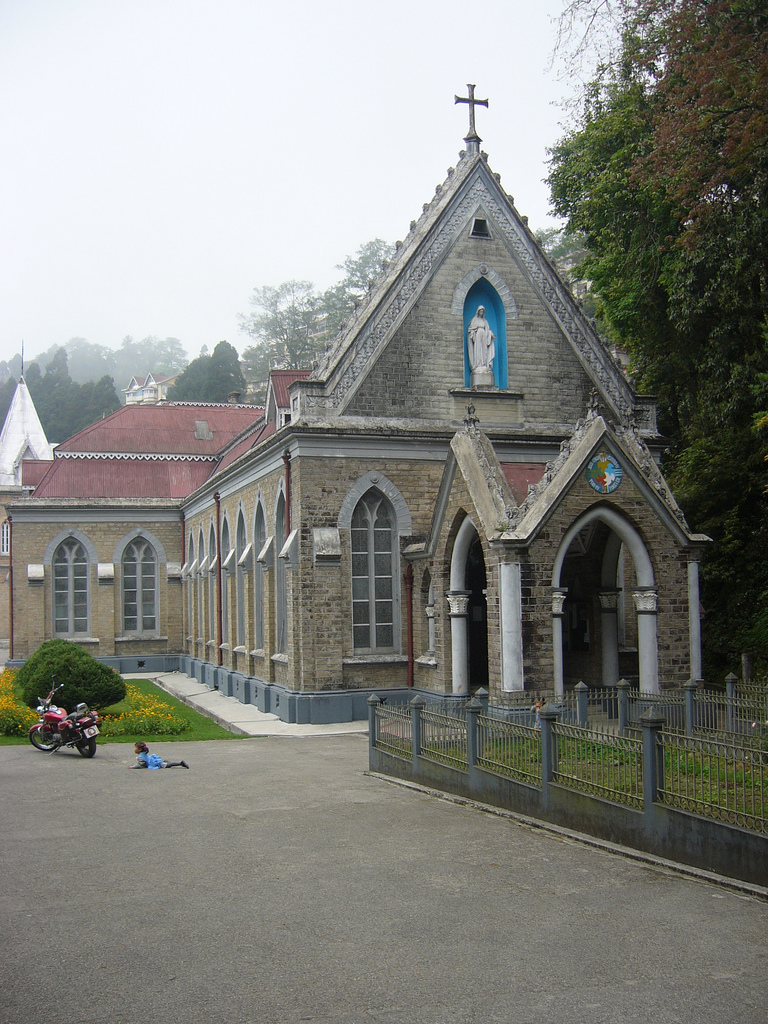
Immaculate Conception Cathedral in Darjeeling

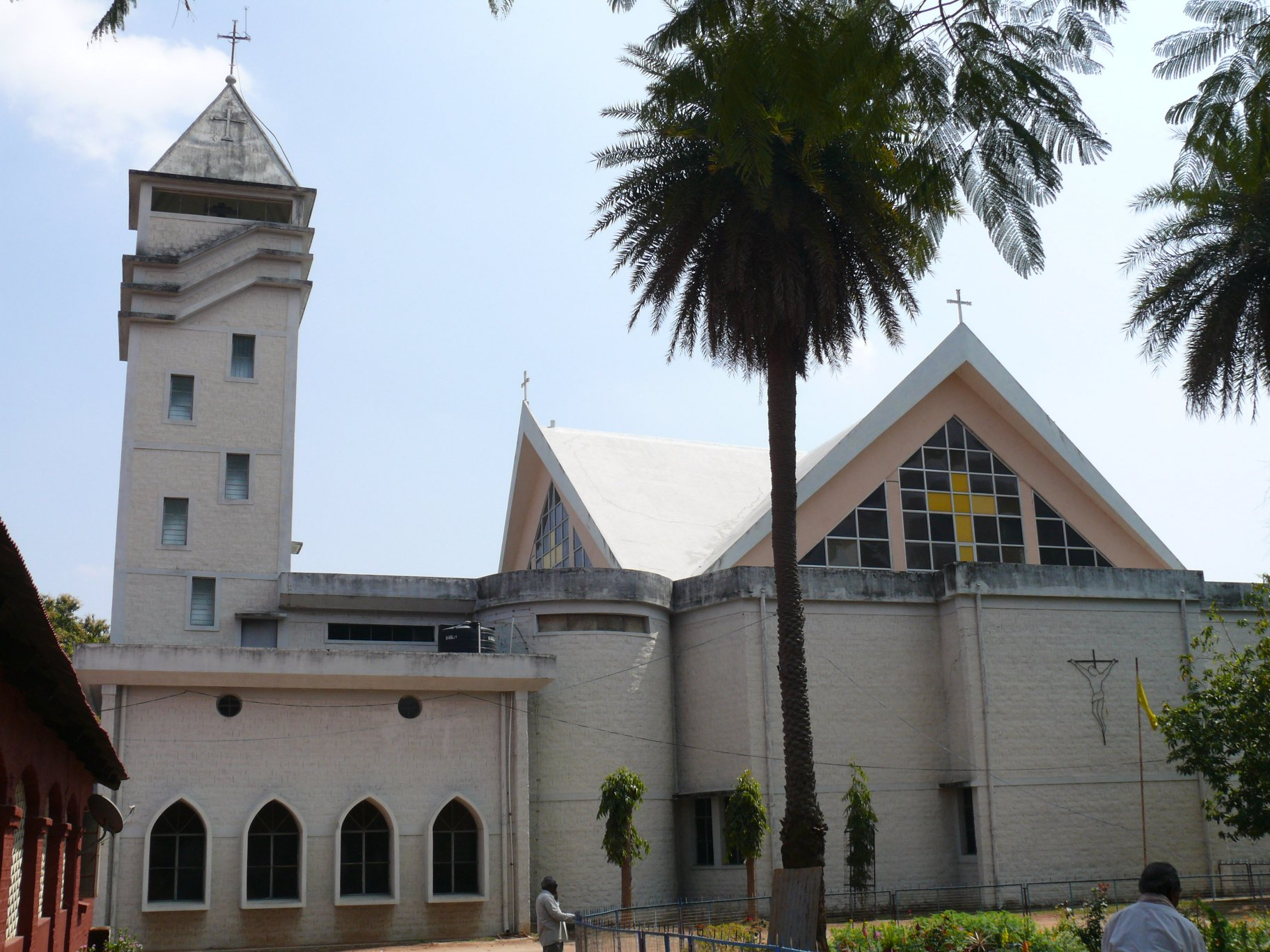
St. Patrick's cathedral in Gumla

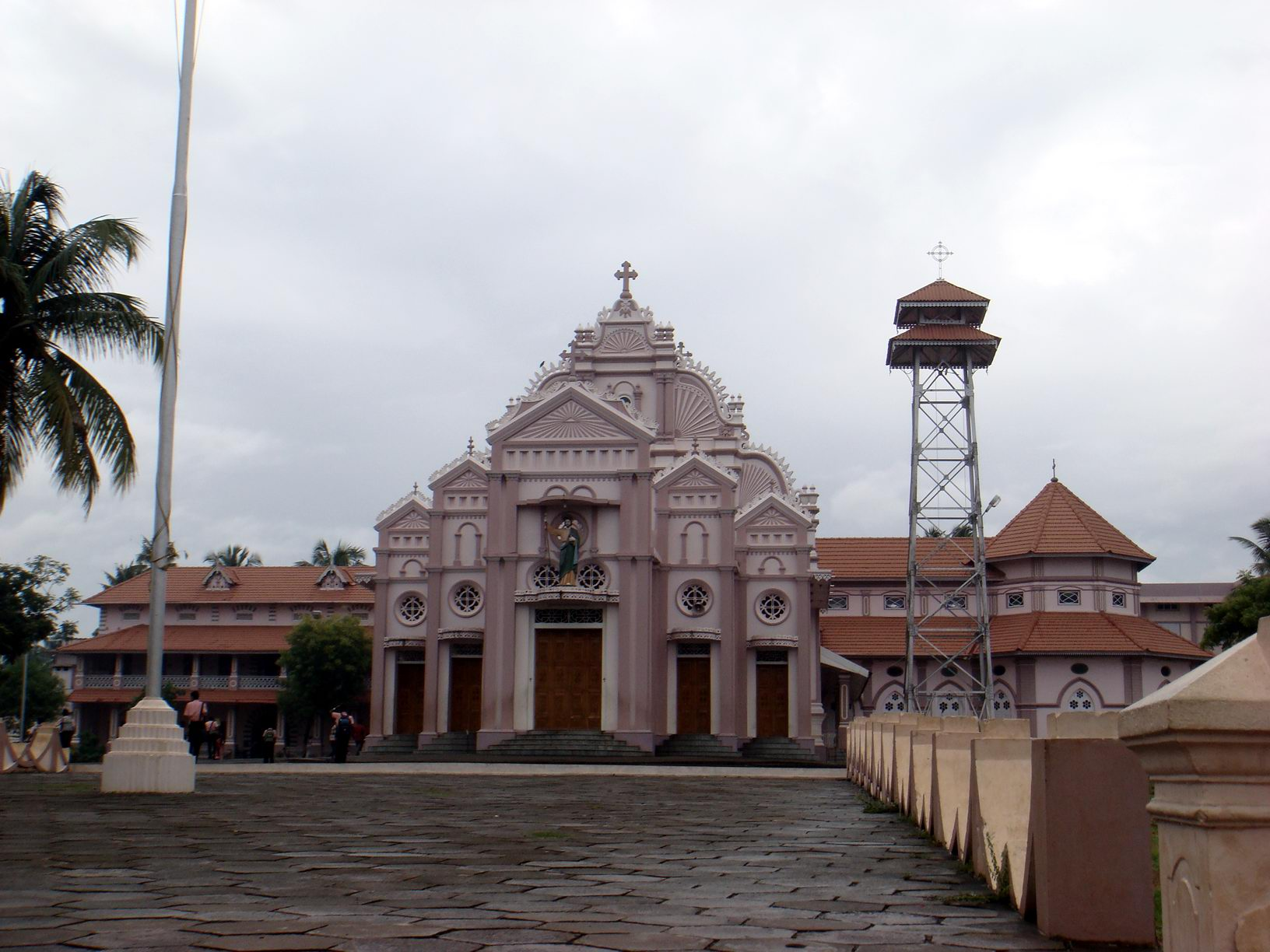
St. Thomas Cathedral in Irinjalakuda

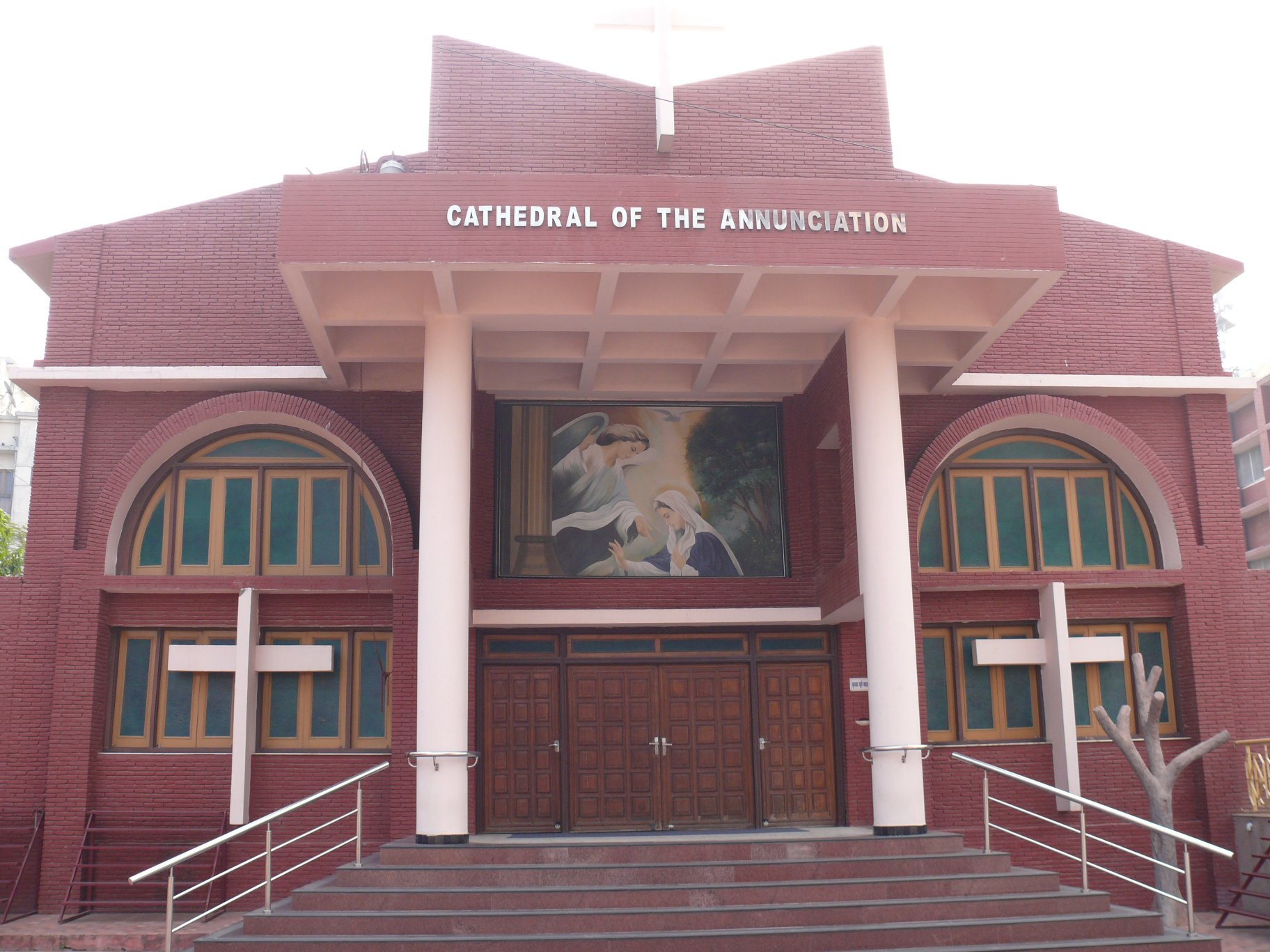
Cathedral of Our Lady of the Annunciation in Jaipur

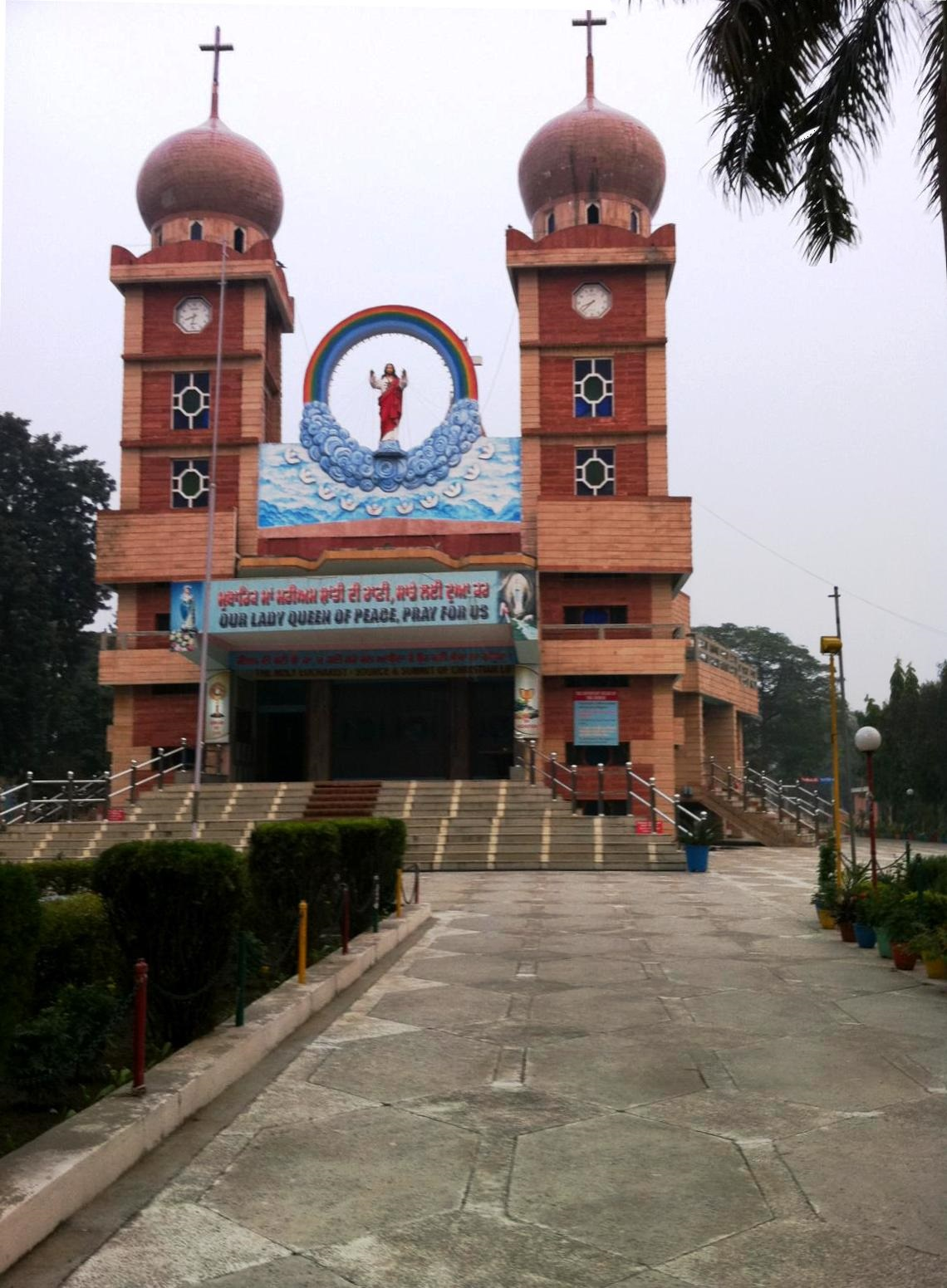
St. Mary's Cathedral in Jalandhar

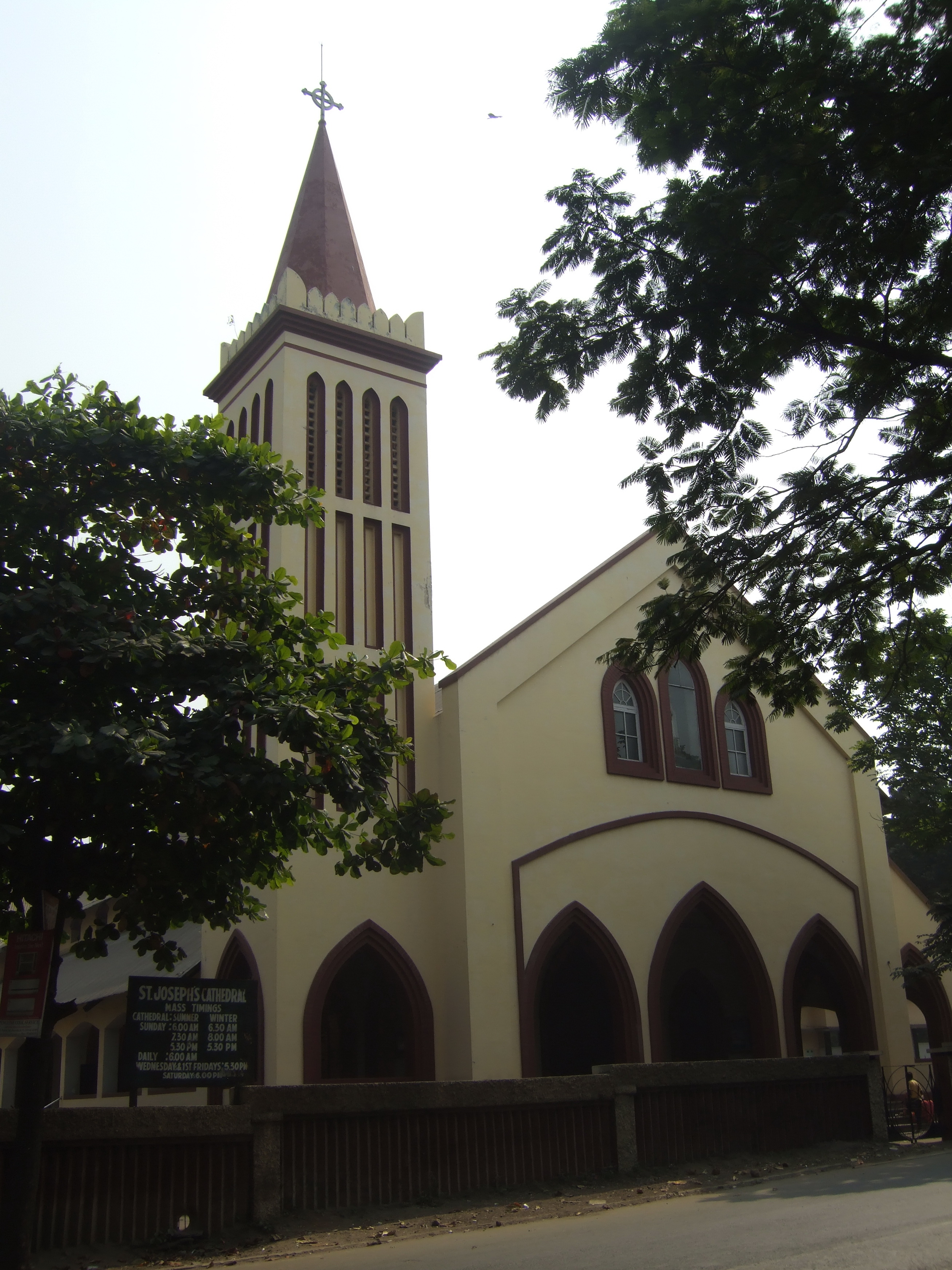
St. Joseph's Cathedral in Jamshedpur

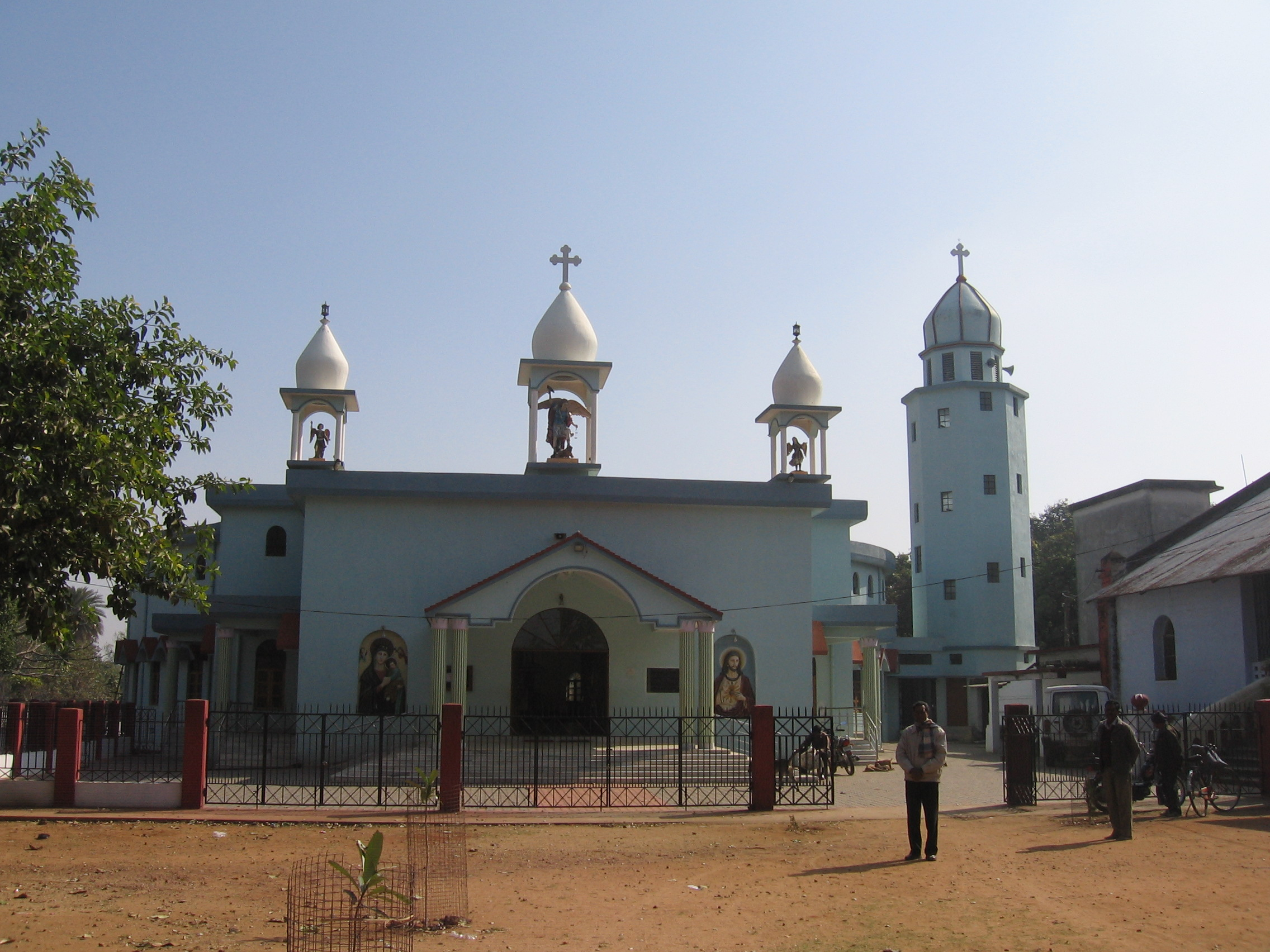
Cathedral of St. Michael in Khunti

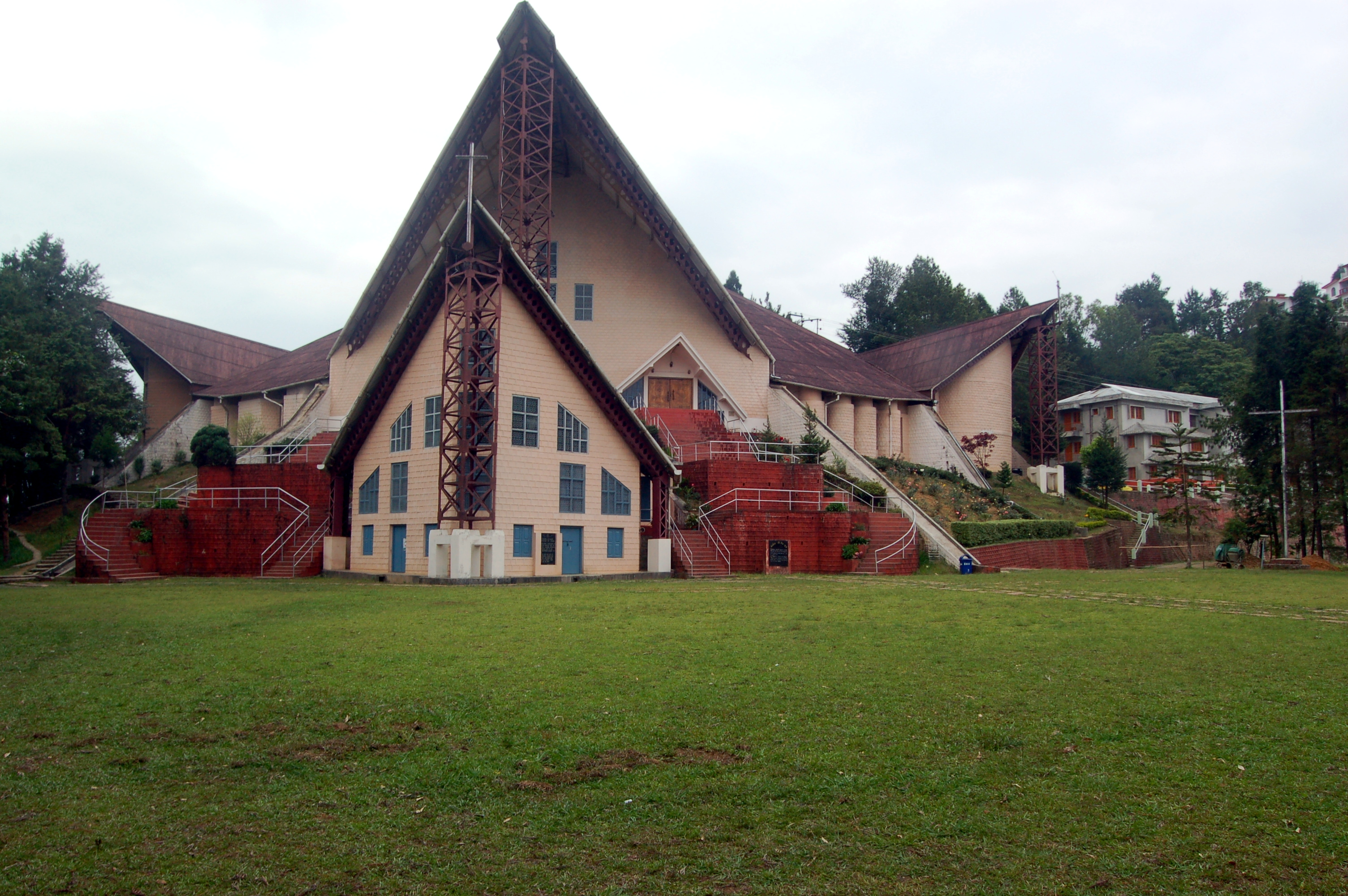
Mary Help of Christians Cathedral in Kohima

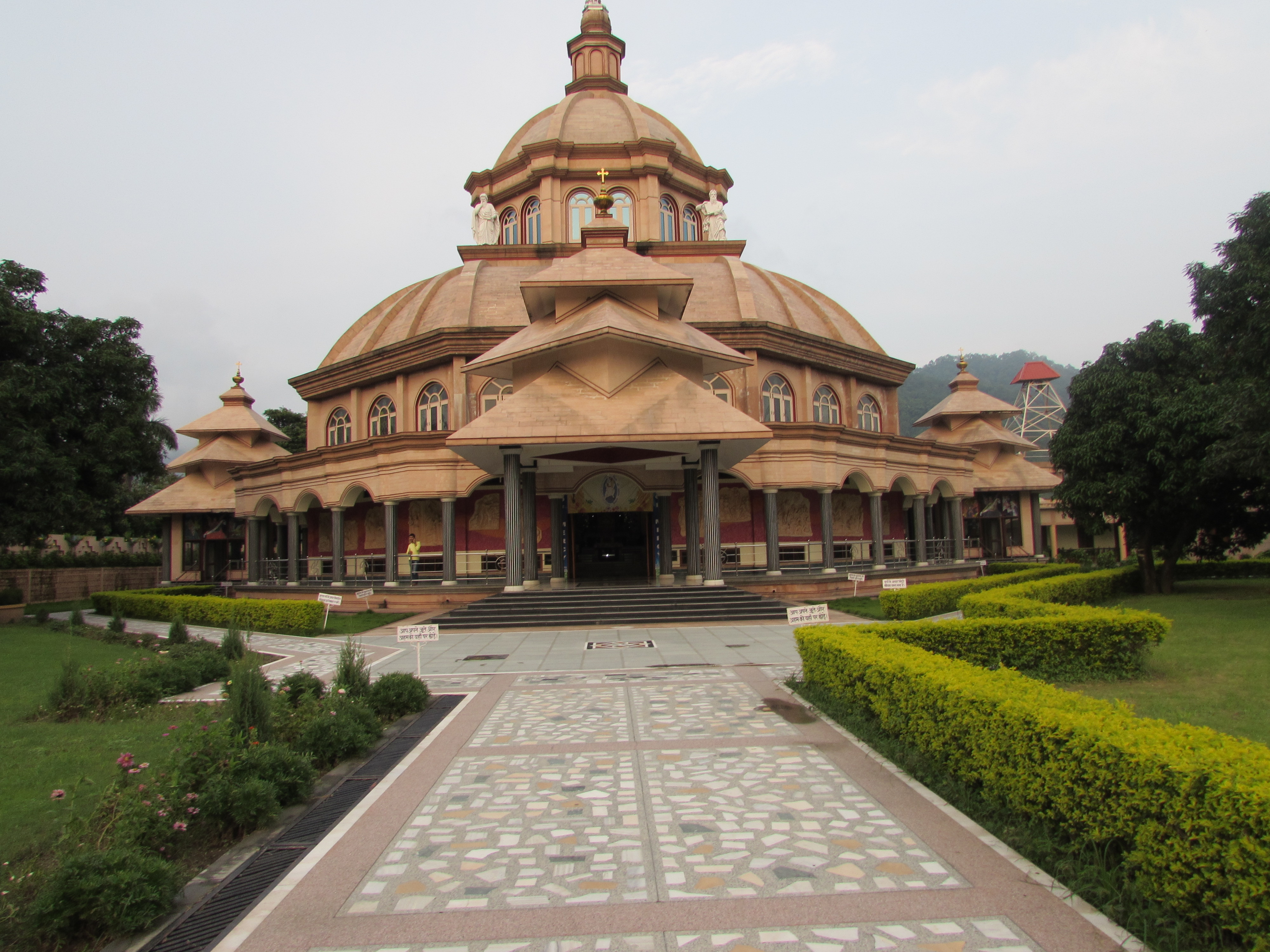
St. Joseph's Cathedral in Kotdwar

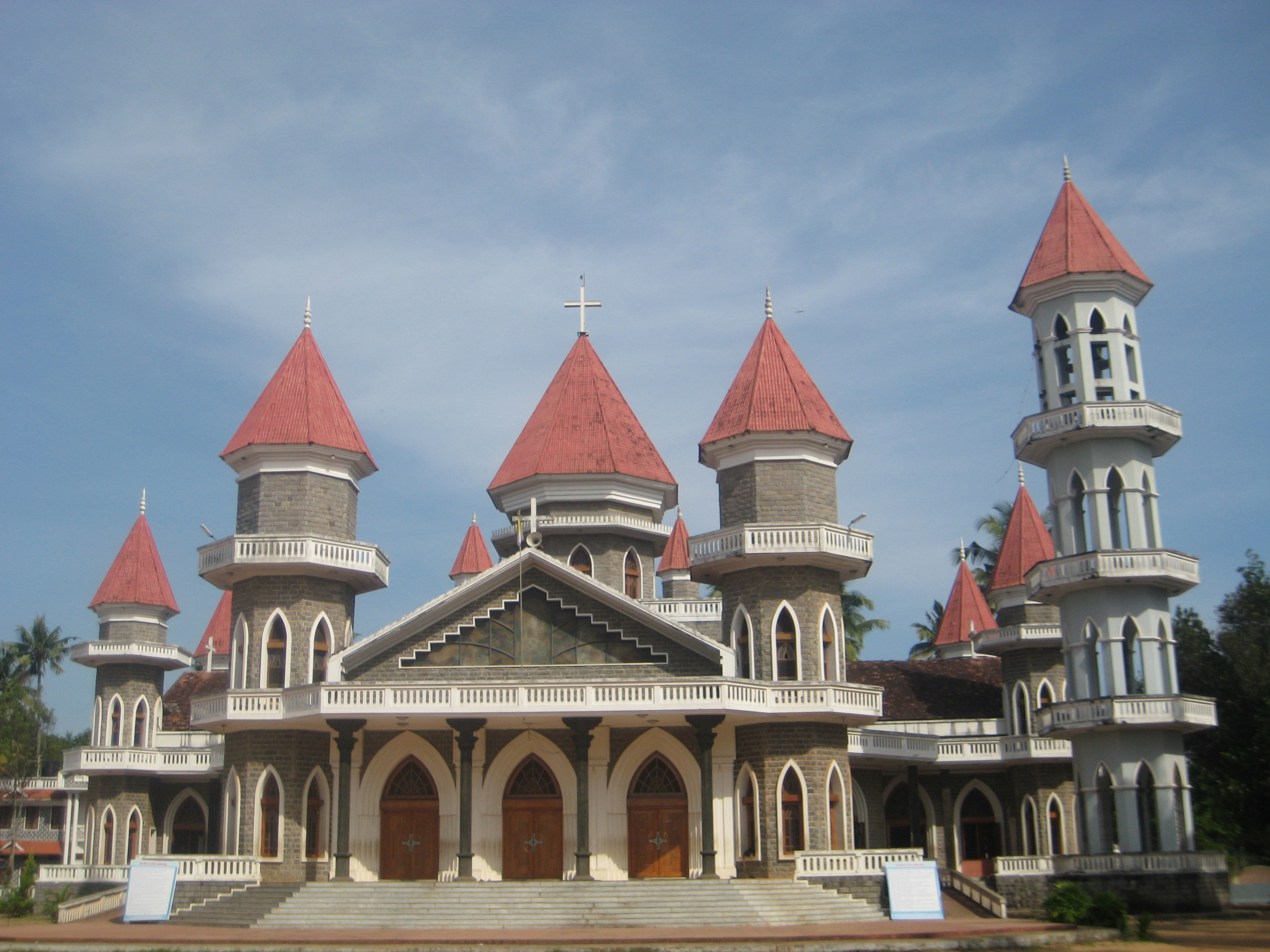
St. Michael's Cathedral in Kottappuram, Thrissur

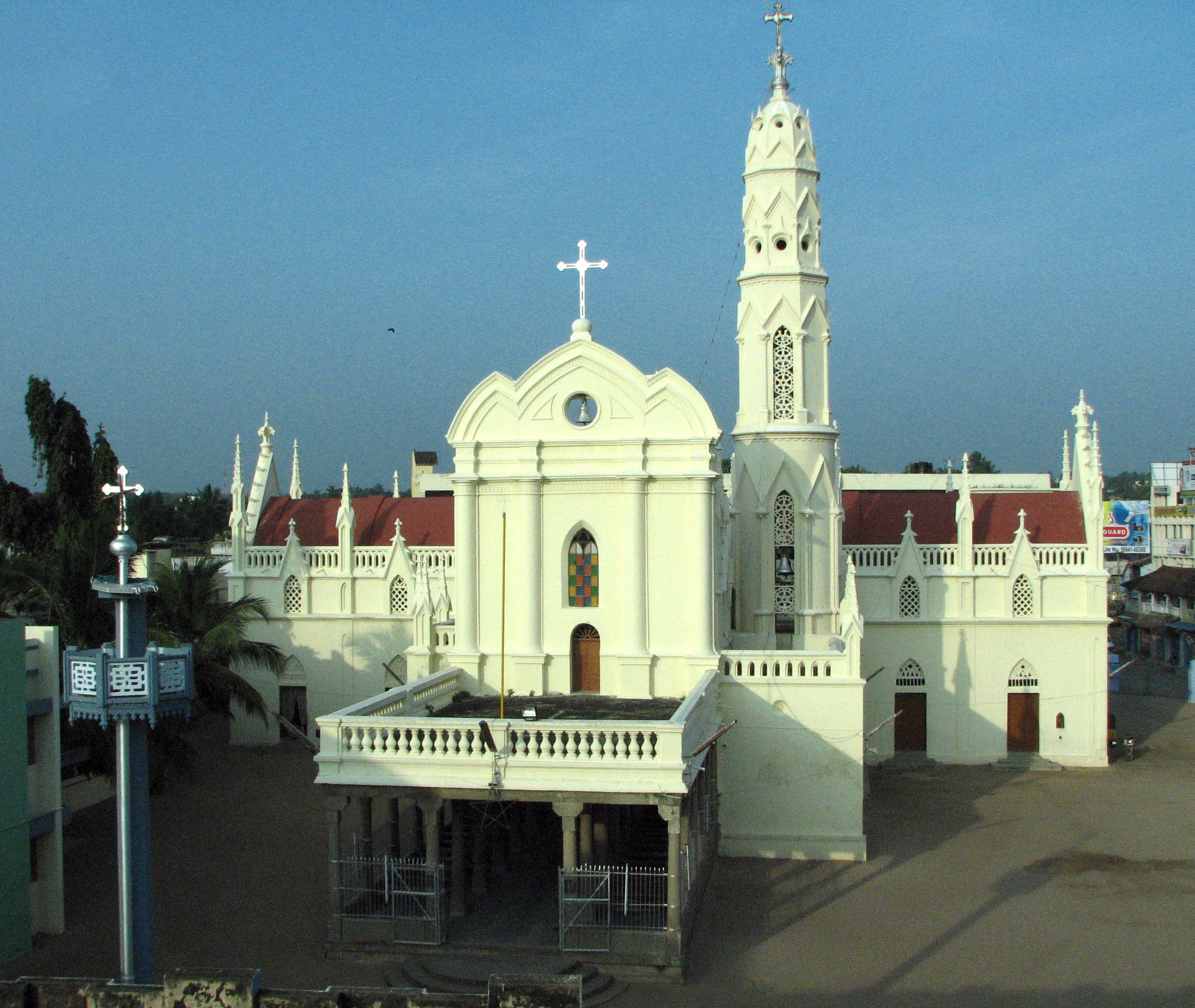
St. Xavier's Cathedral in Kottar

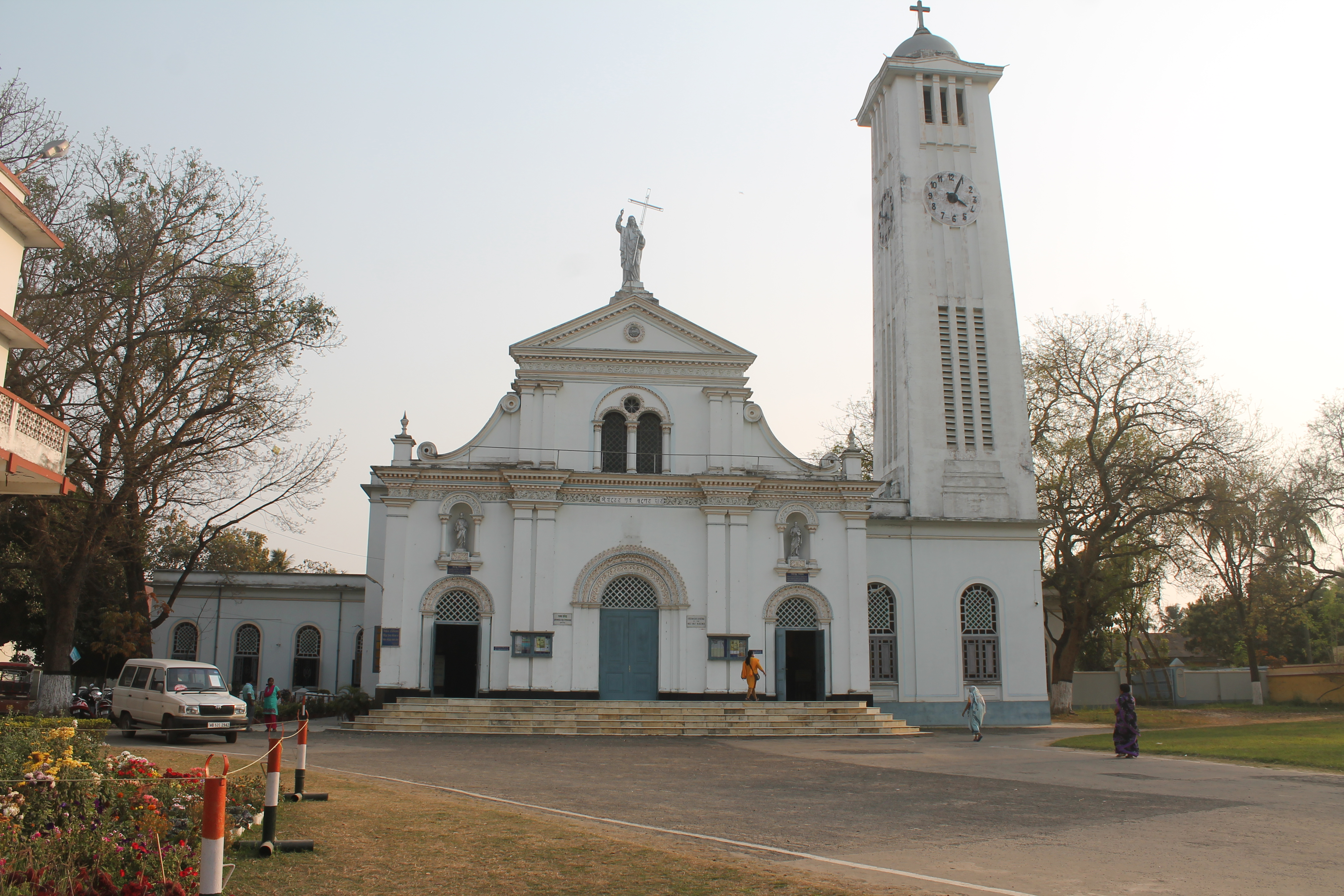
Cathedral of the Holy Redeemer in Krishnagar

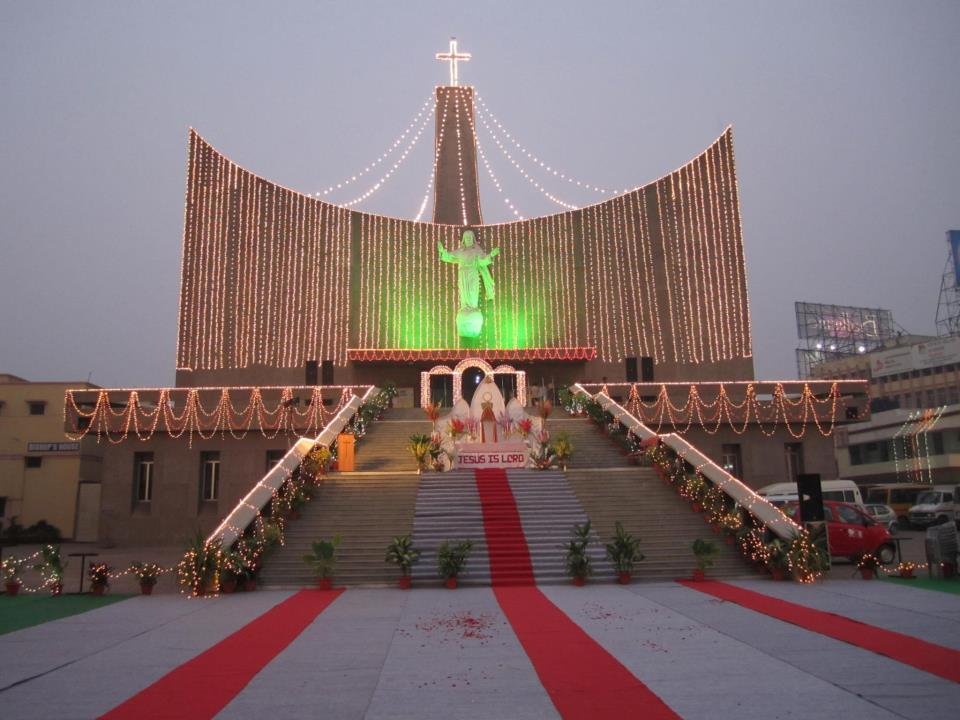
St. Joseph's Cathedral in Lucknow

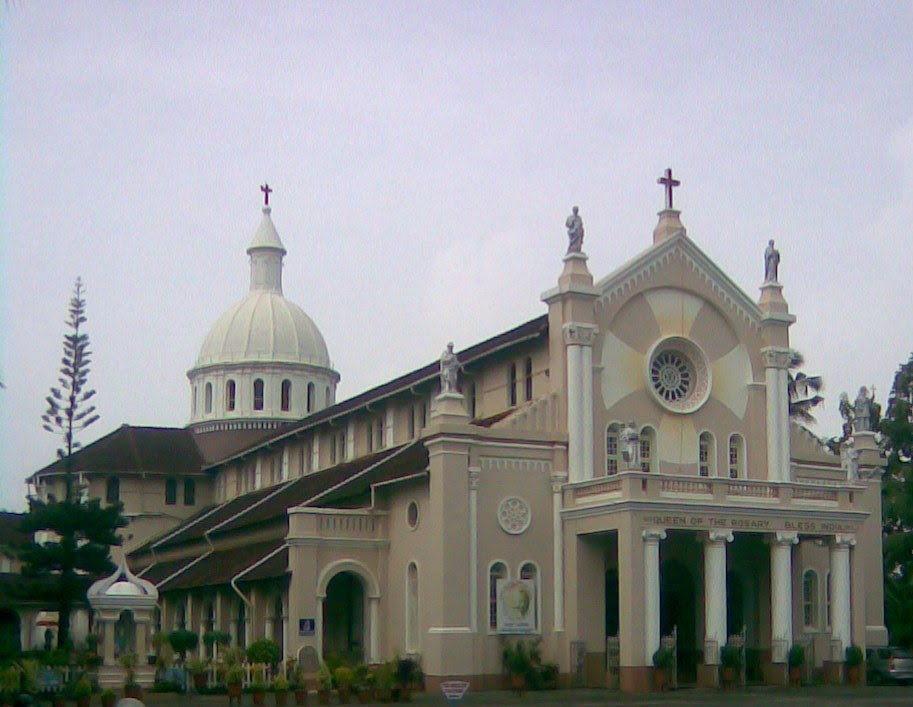
Our Lady of the Rosary Cathedral in Mangalore

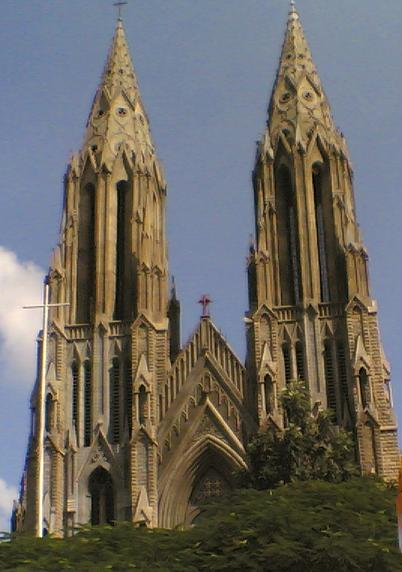
St. Philomena's Cathedral in Mysore

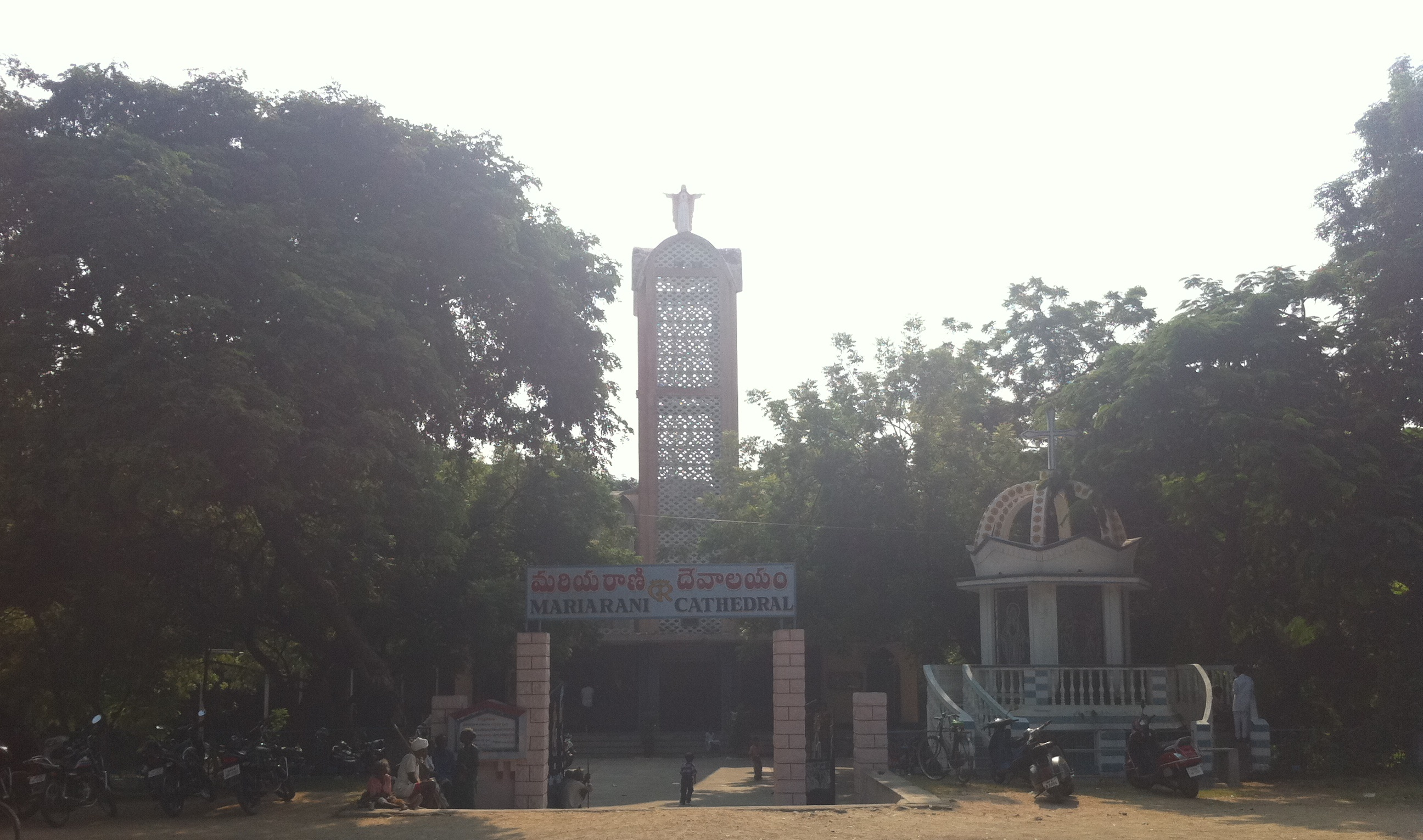
Mariarani Cathedral in Nalgonda

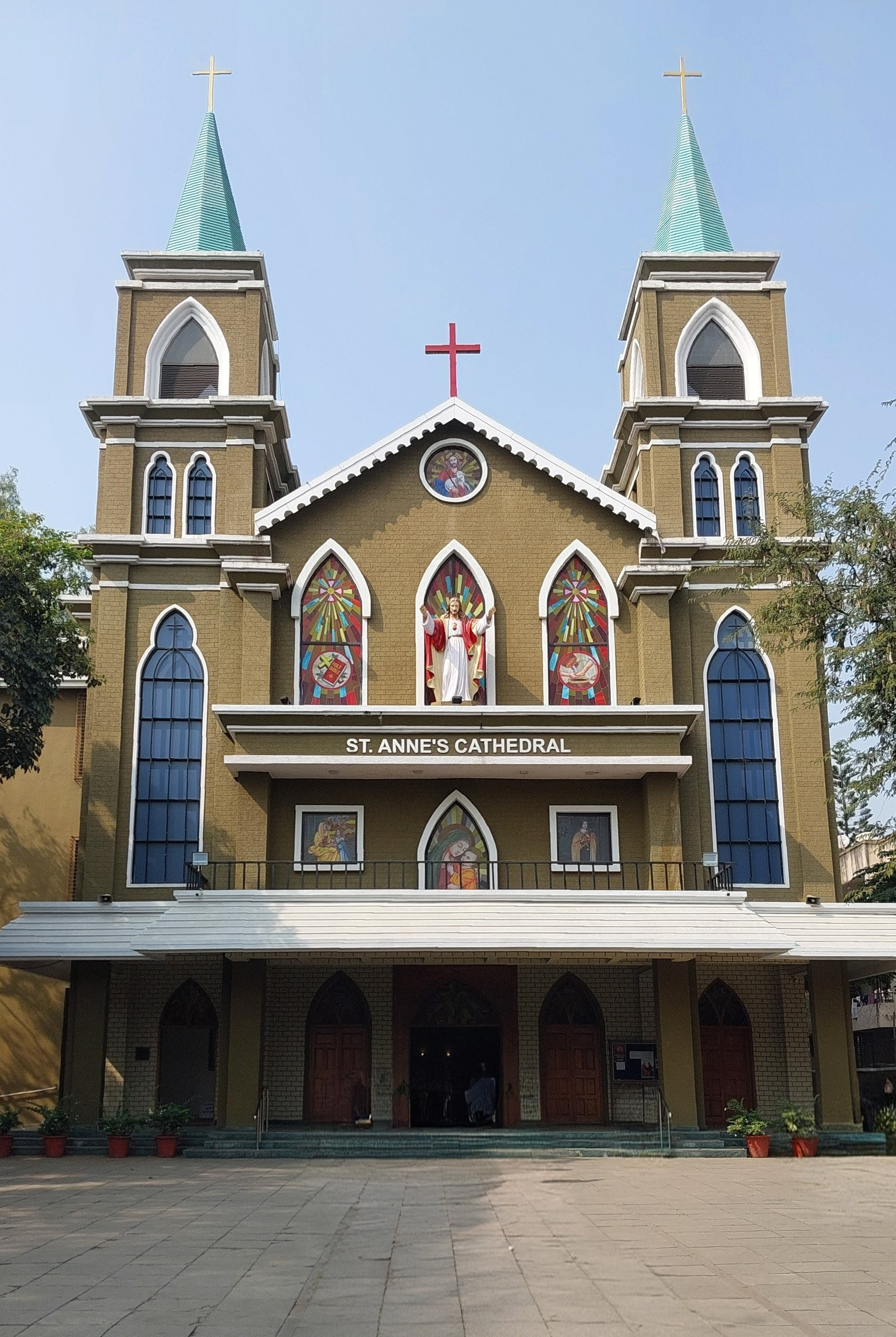
Cathedral of St. Anne in Nashik

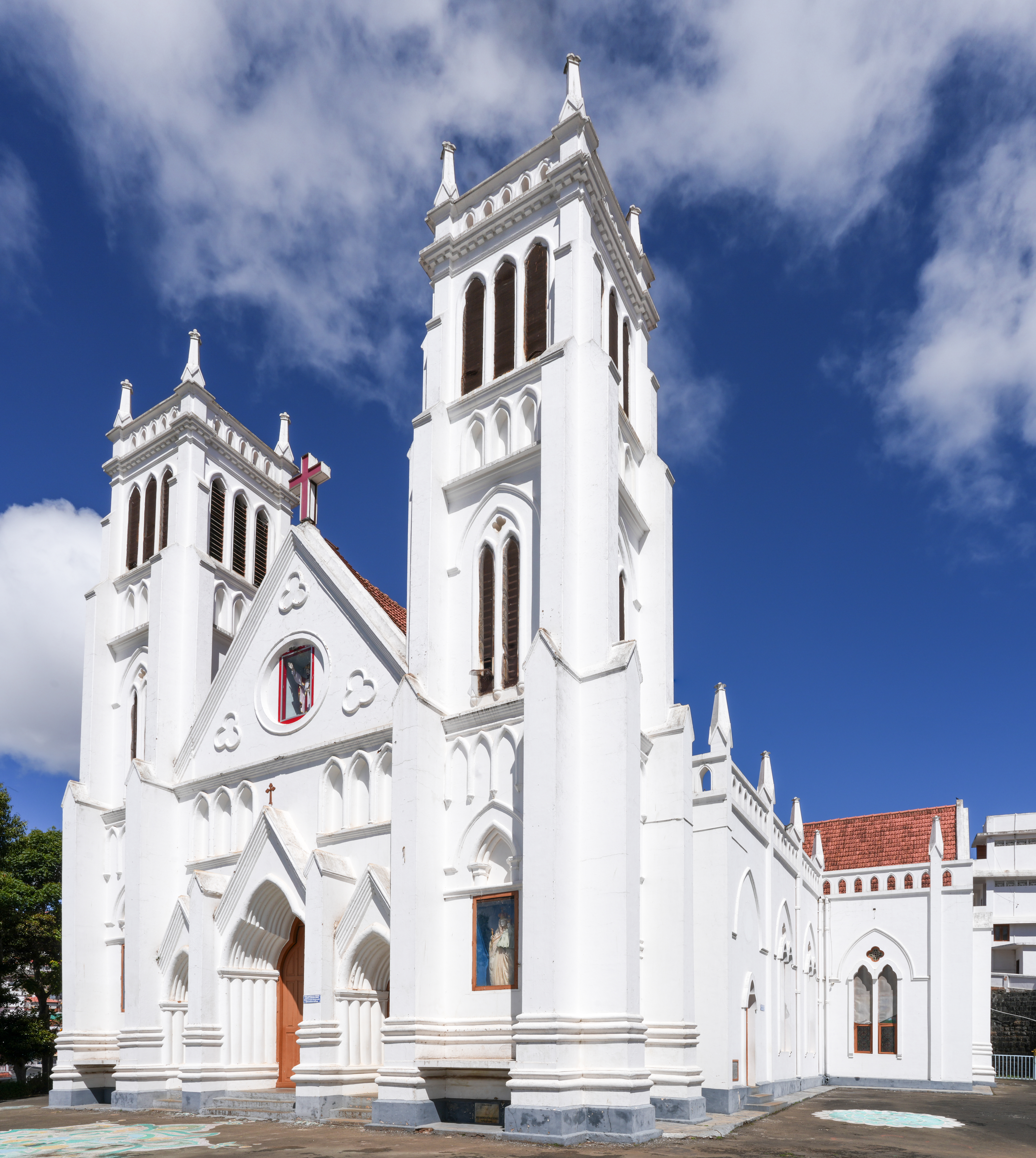
Sacred Hear Cathedral in Ooty

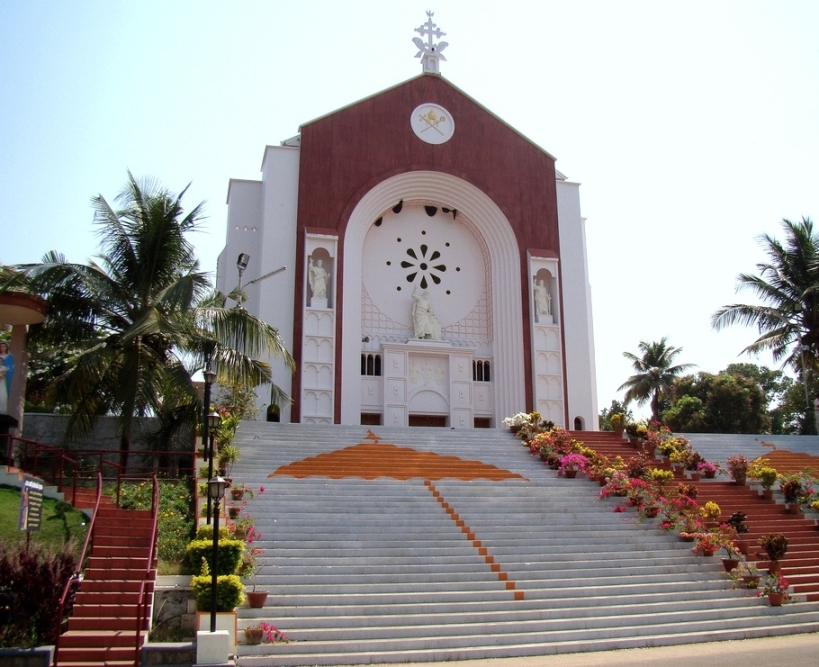
St. Thomas Cathedral in Pala

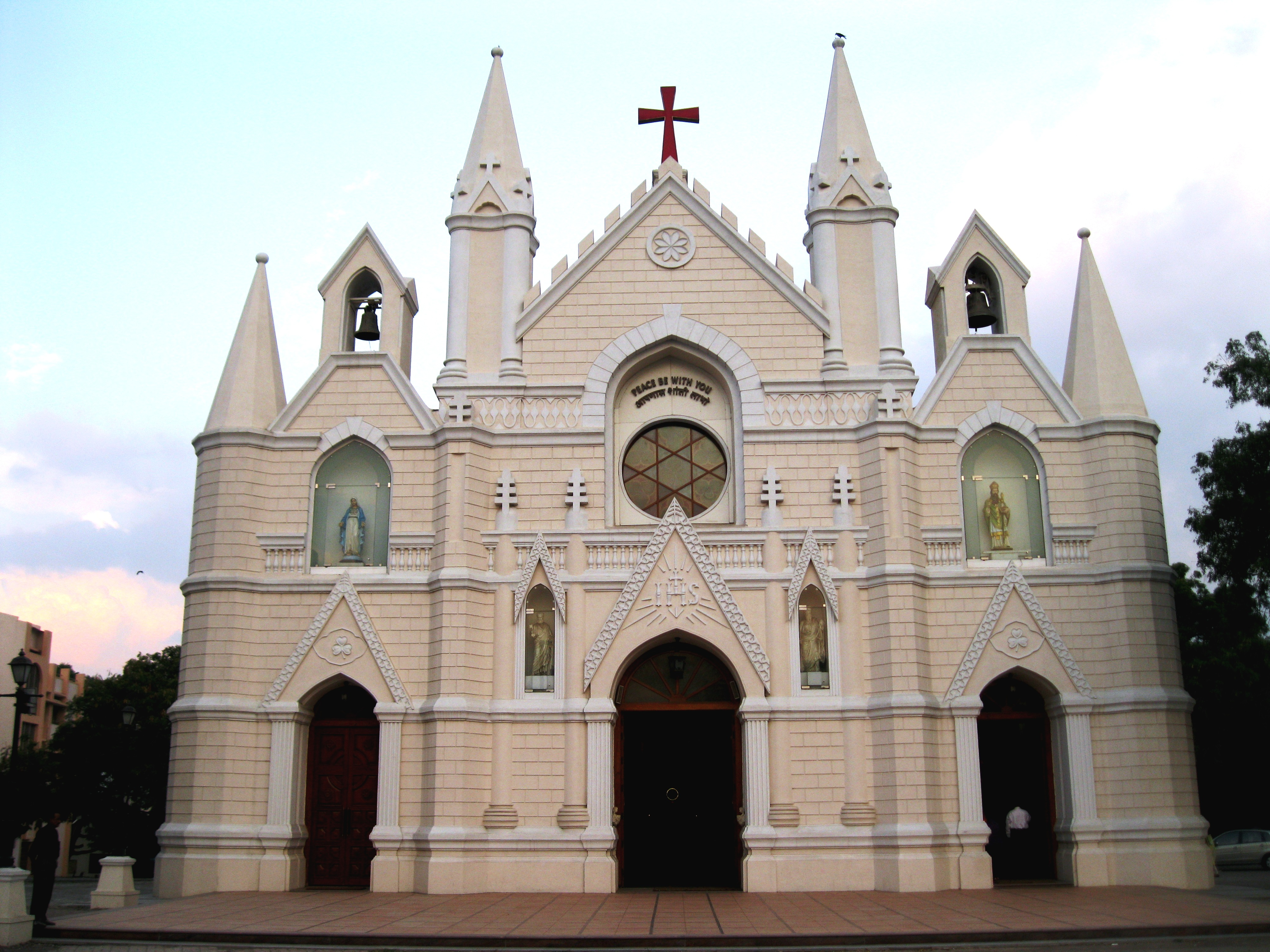
St. Patrick's Cathedral in Poona

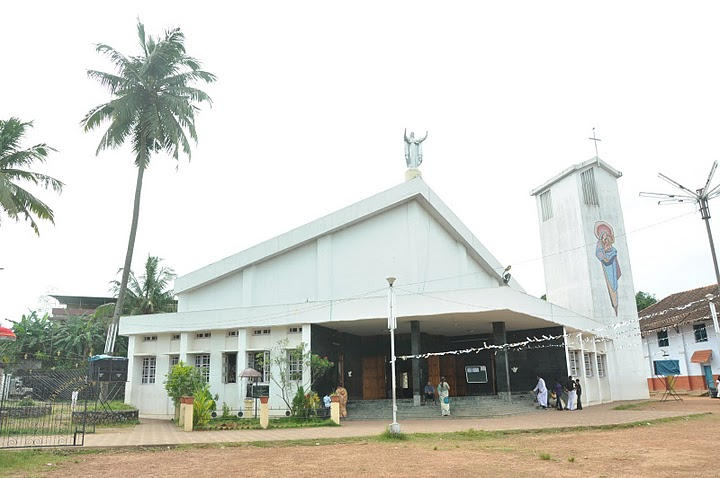
St. Mary's Cathedral in Punalur

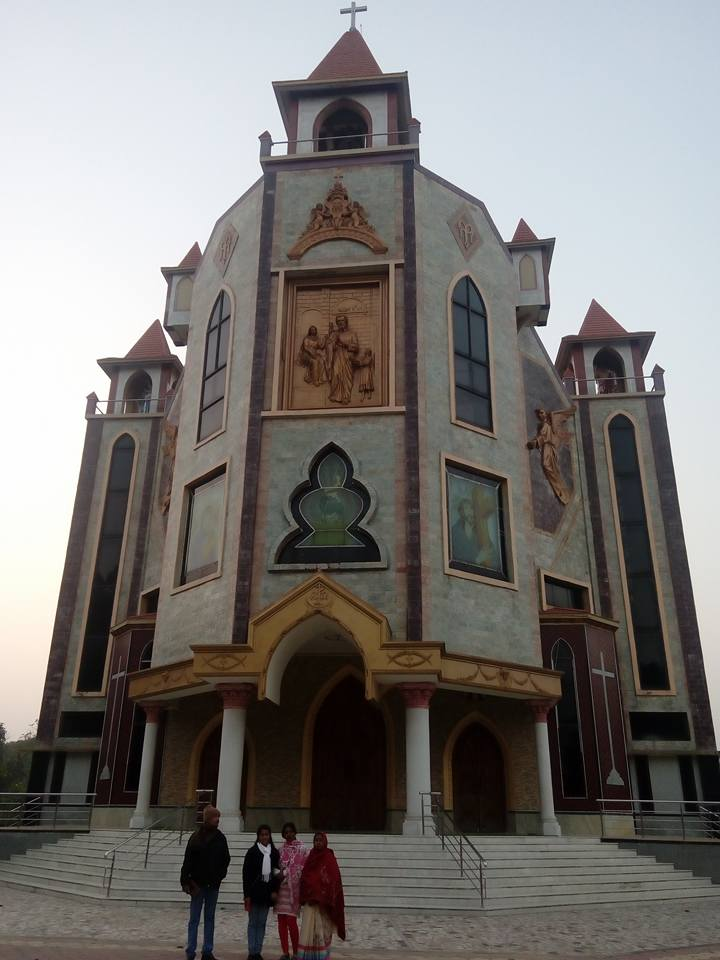
St. Joseph the Worker Cathedral in Raiganj

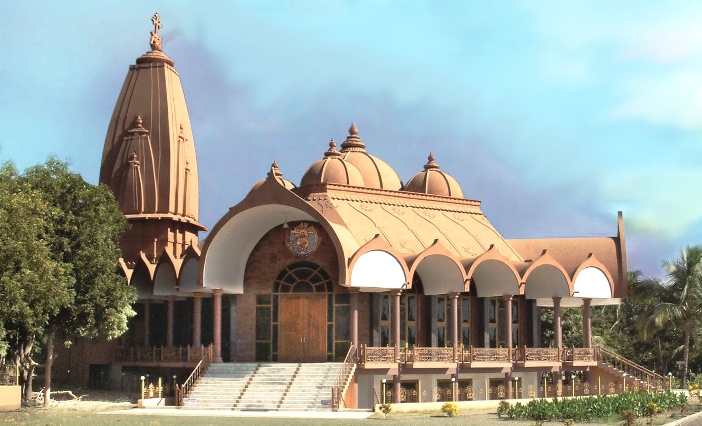
Prem Mandir, cathedral of Rajkot

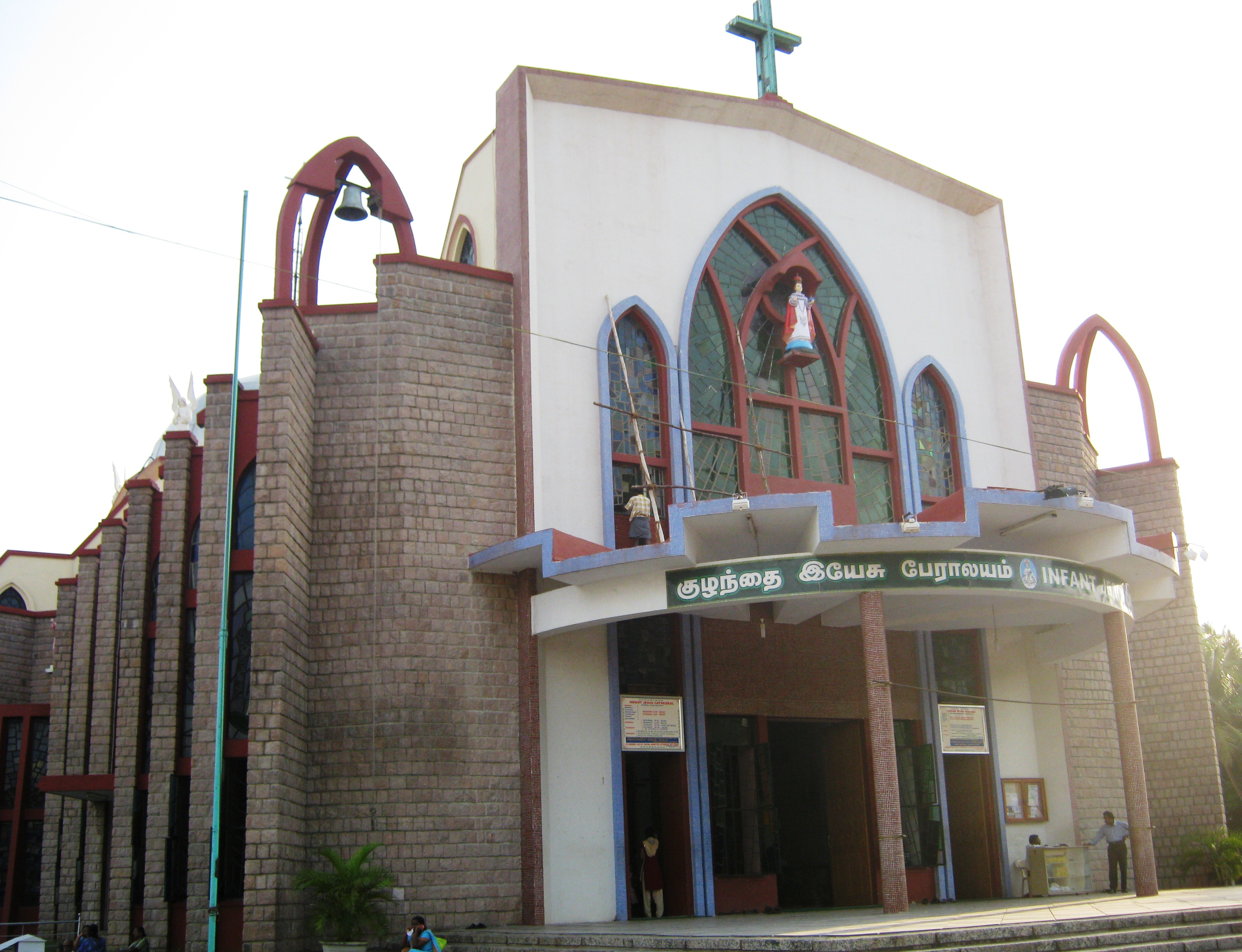
Infant Jesus Cathedral in Salem

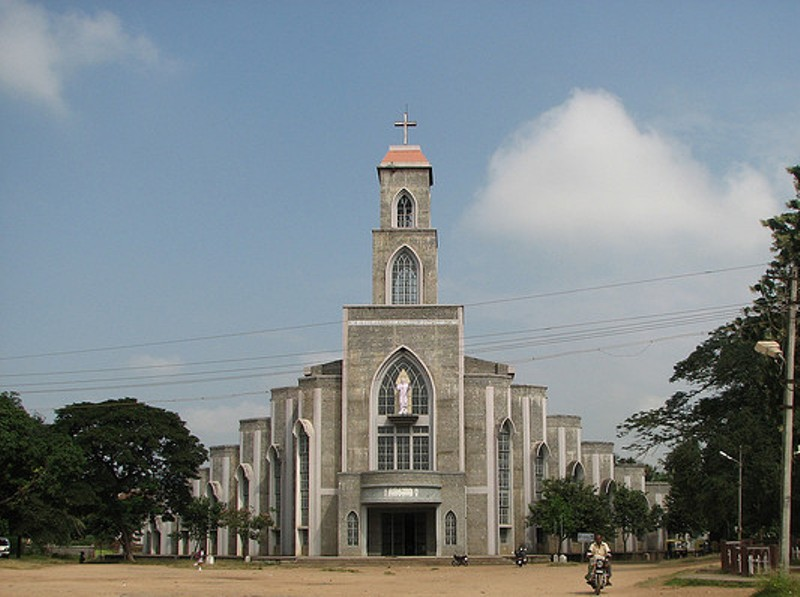
Sacred Heart Cathedral in Shimoga

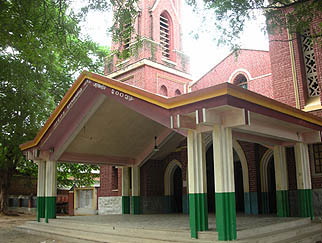
St. Anne Cathedral in Simdega

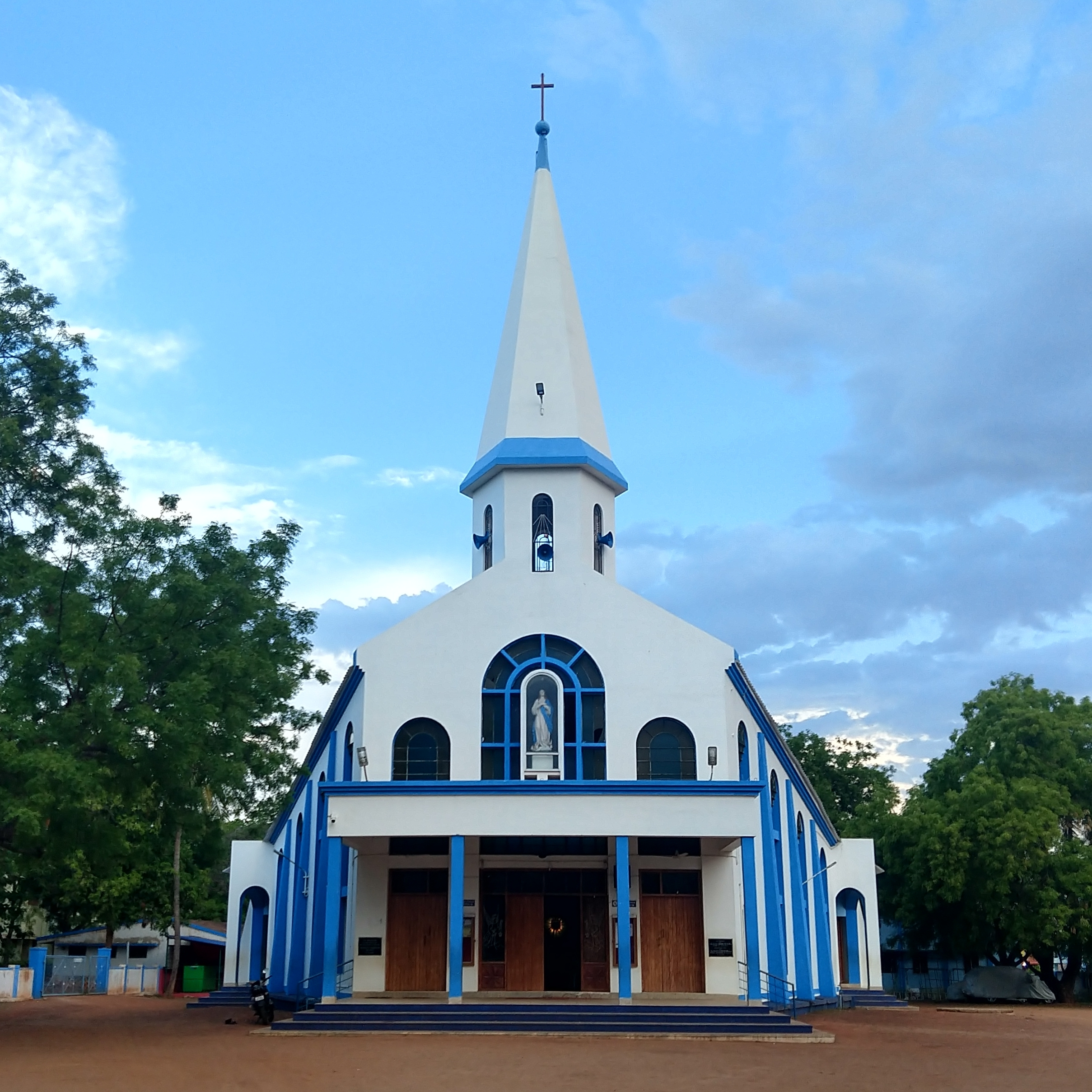
Alangara Annai Cathedral in Sivagangai

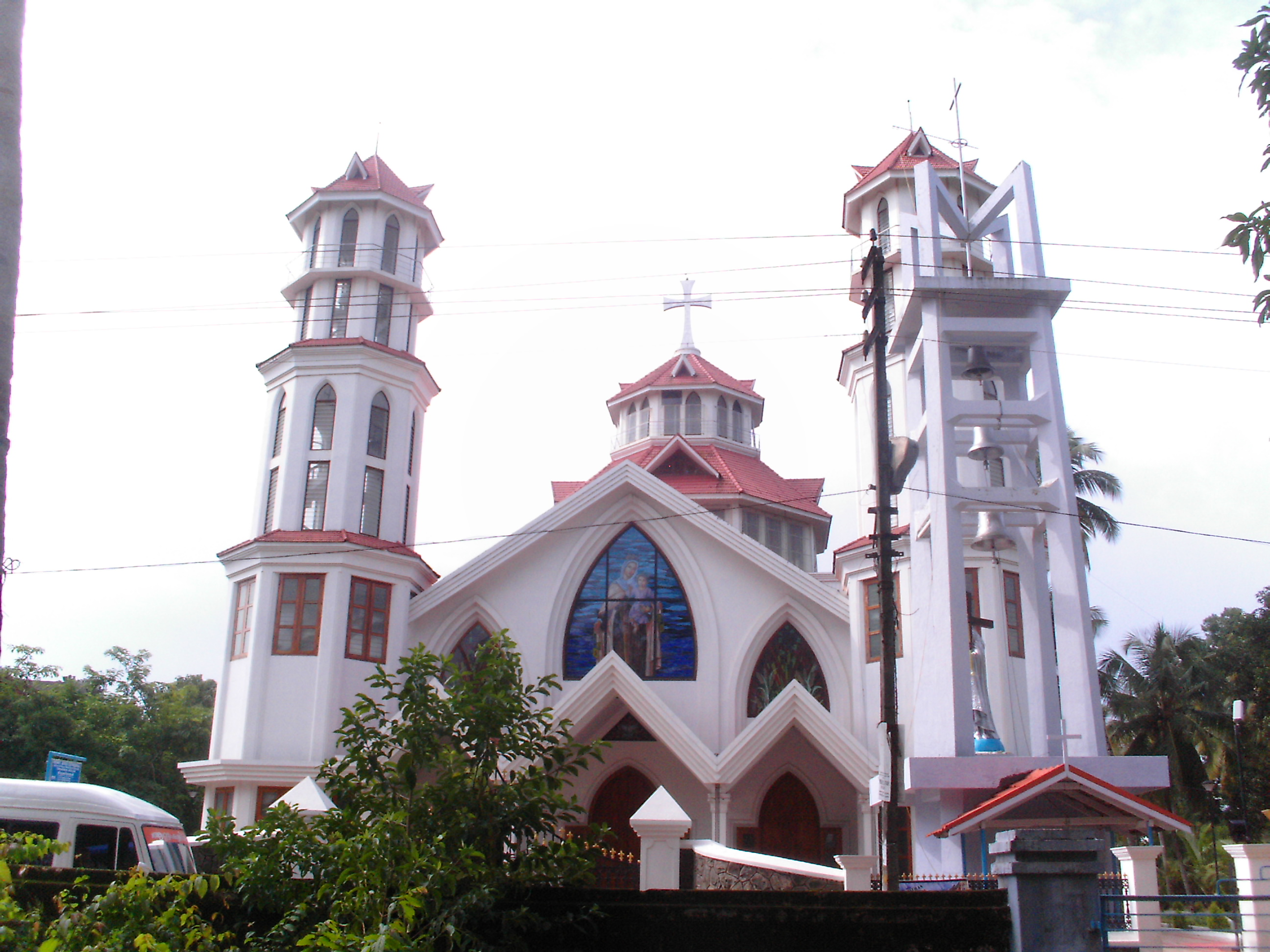
Infant Jesus Cathedral in Tangasseri

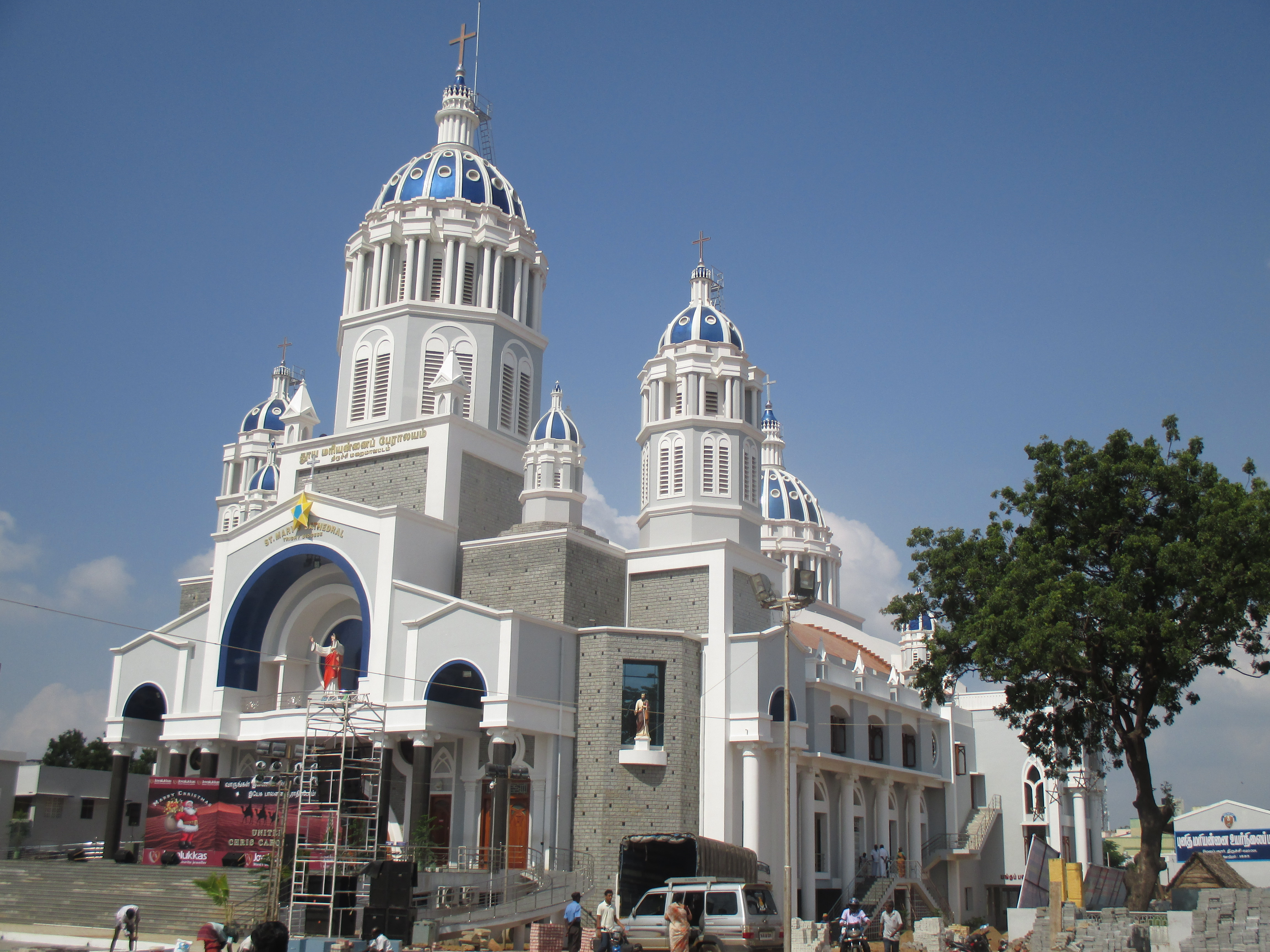
St. Mary's Cathedral in Tiruchirapalli

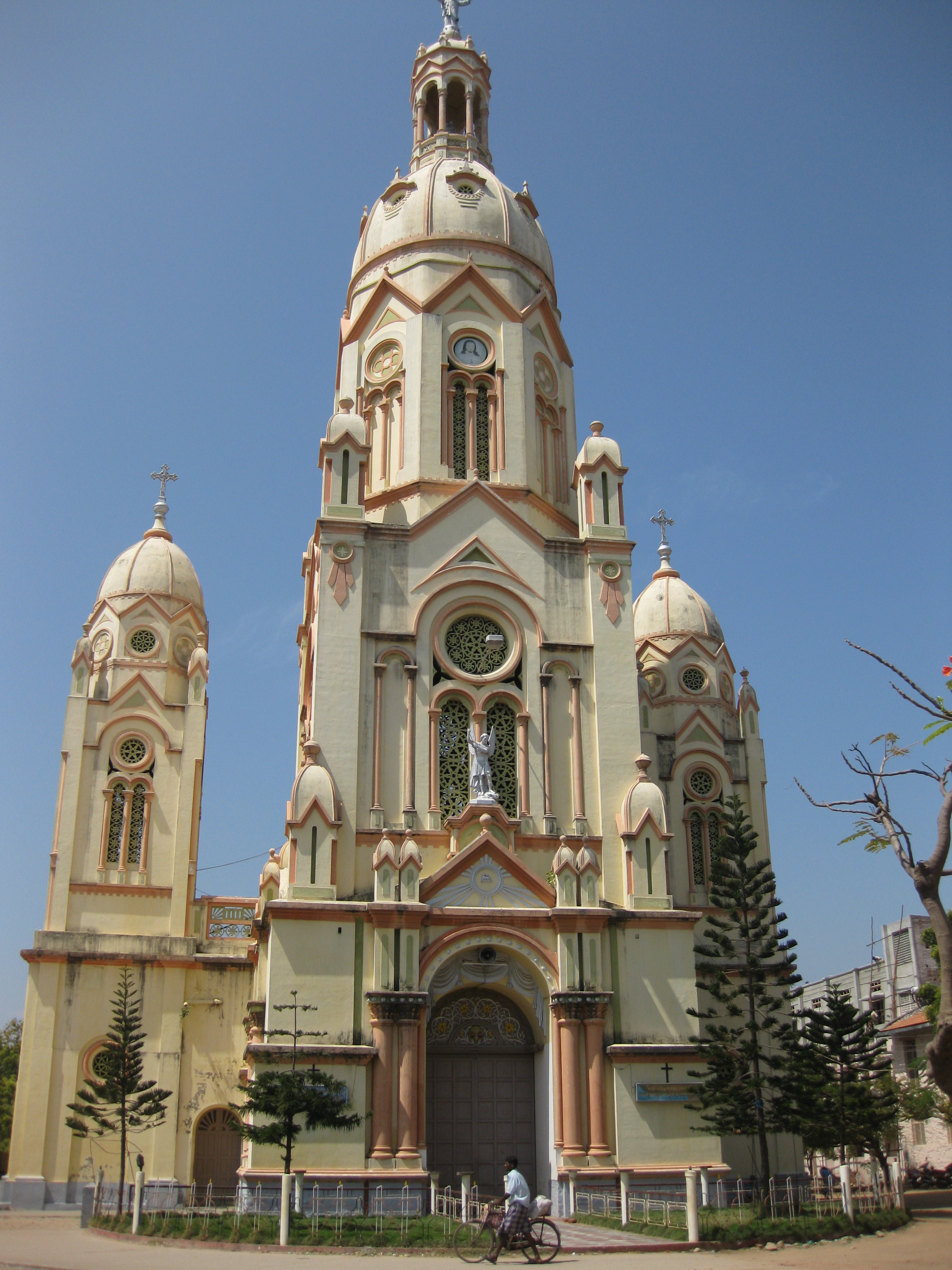
Sacred Heart Cathedral in Tuticorin

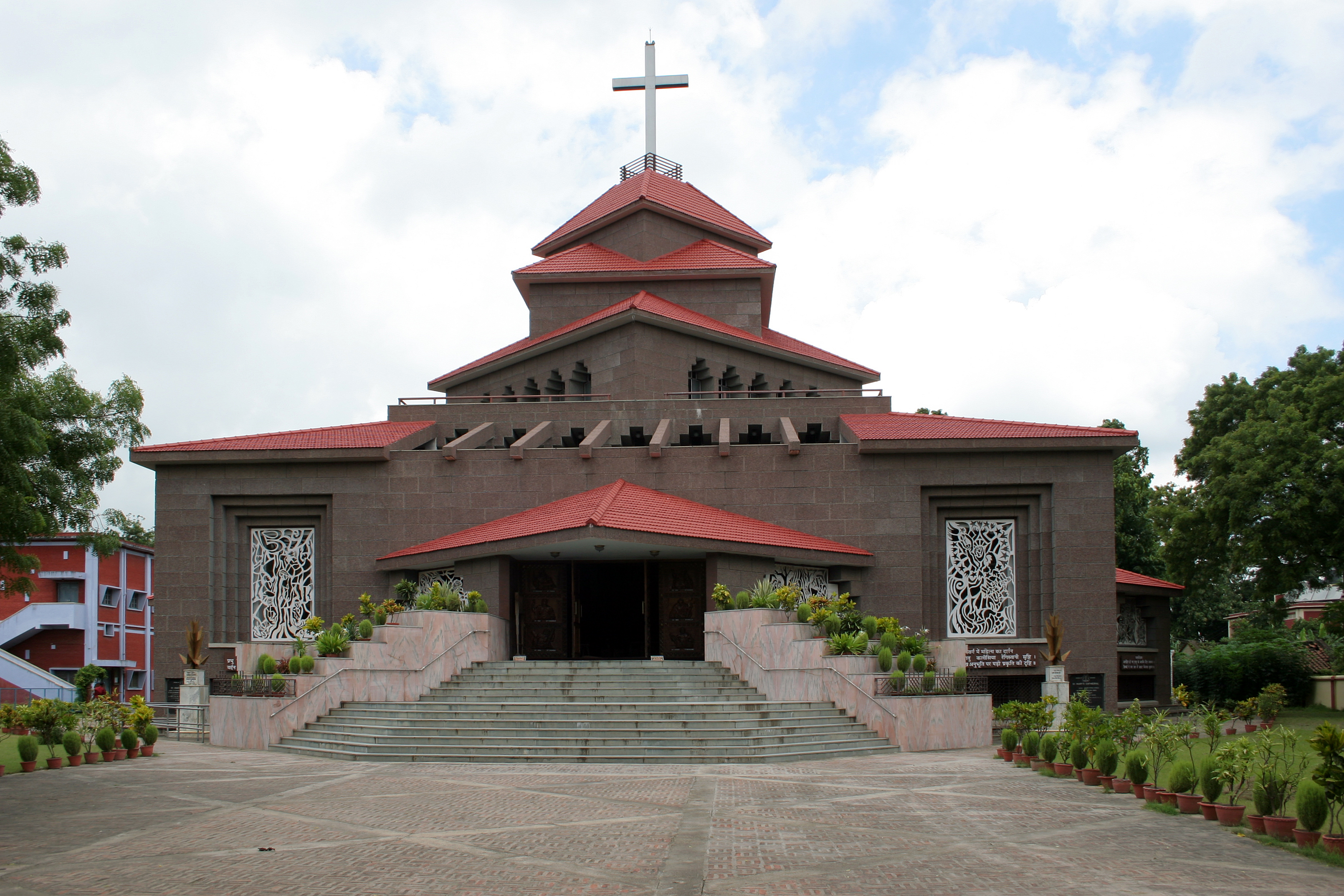
St. Mary's Cathedral in Varanasi

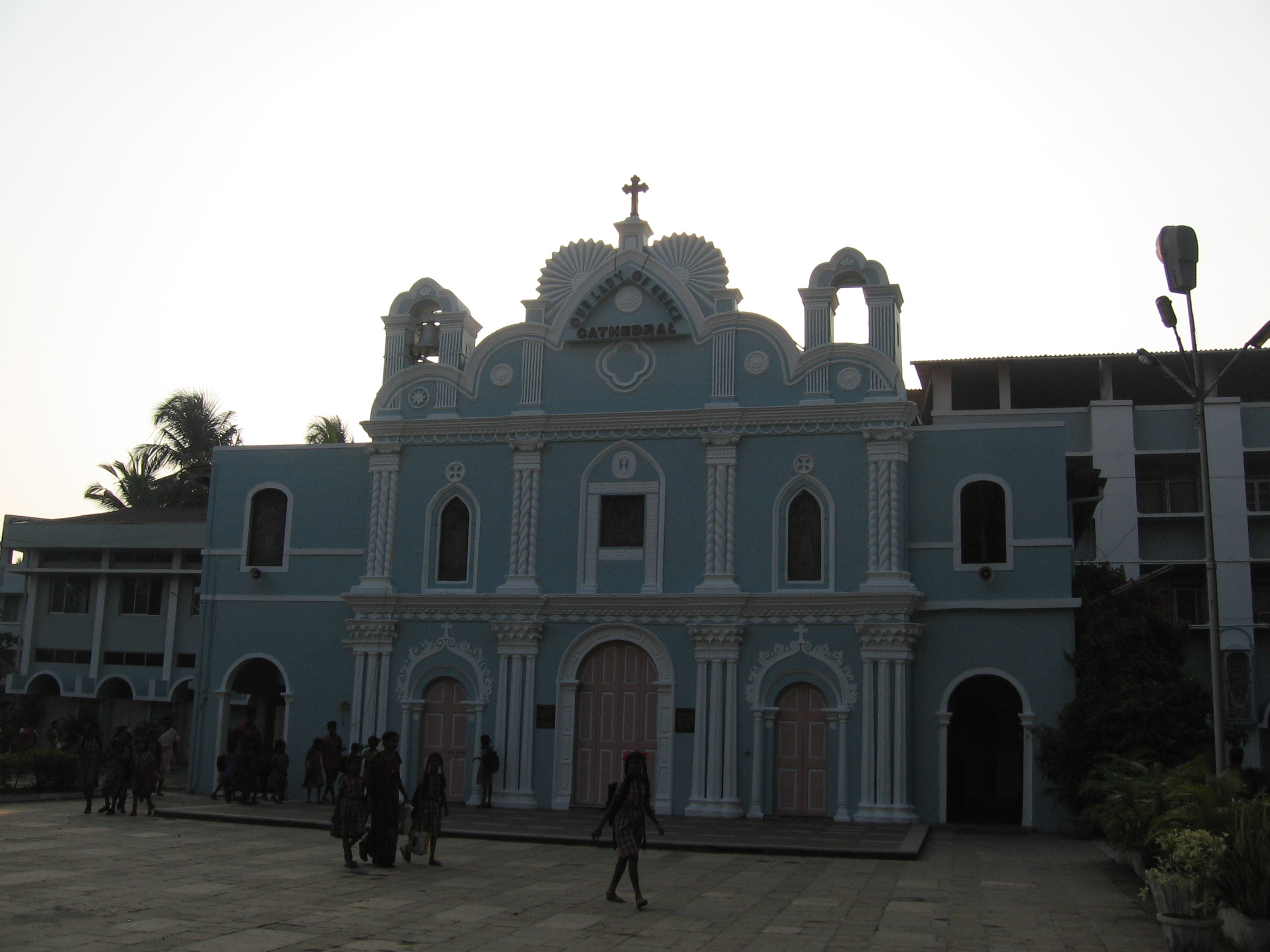
Cathedral Our Lady of Graces in Vasai

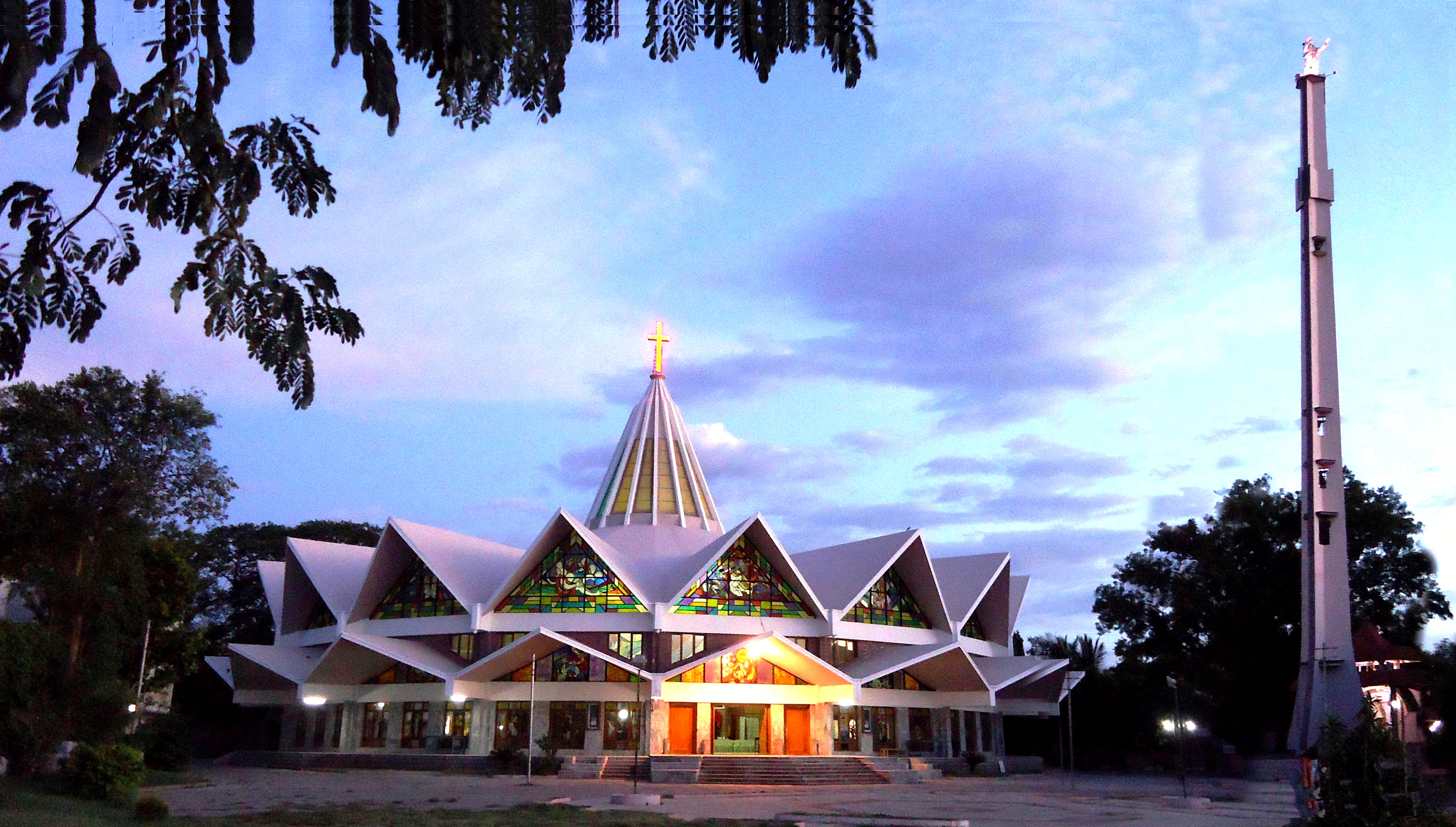
Assumption Cathedral in Vellore

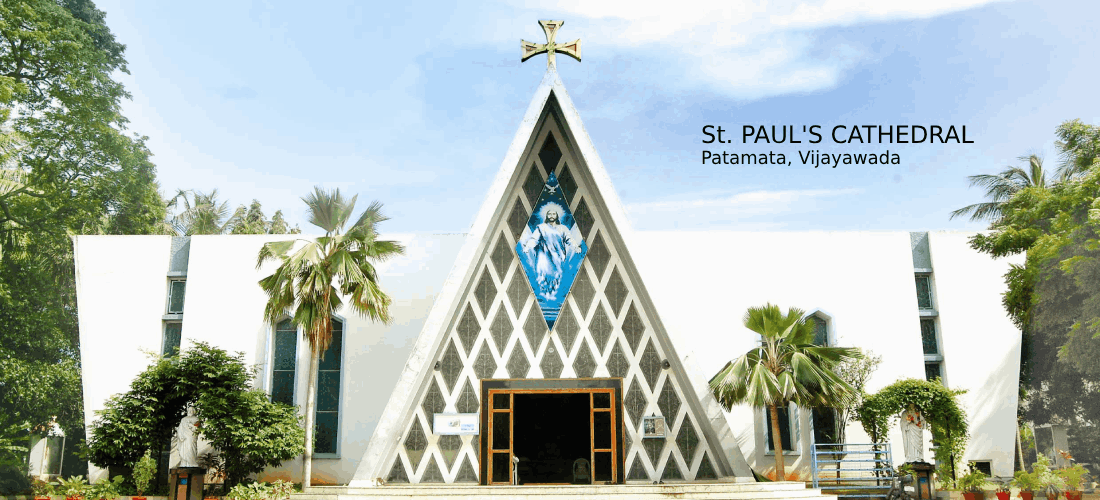
St. Paul's Cathedral in Vijayawada

== Anglican ==
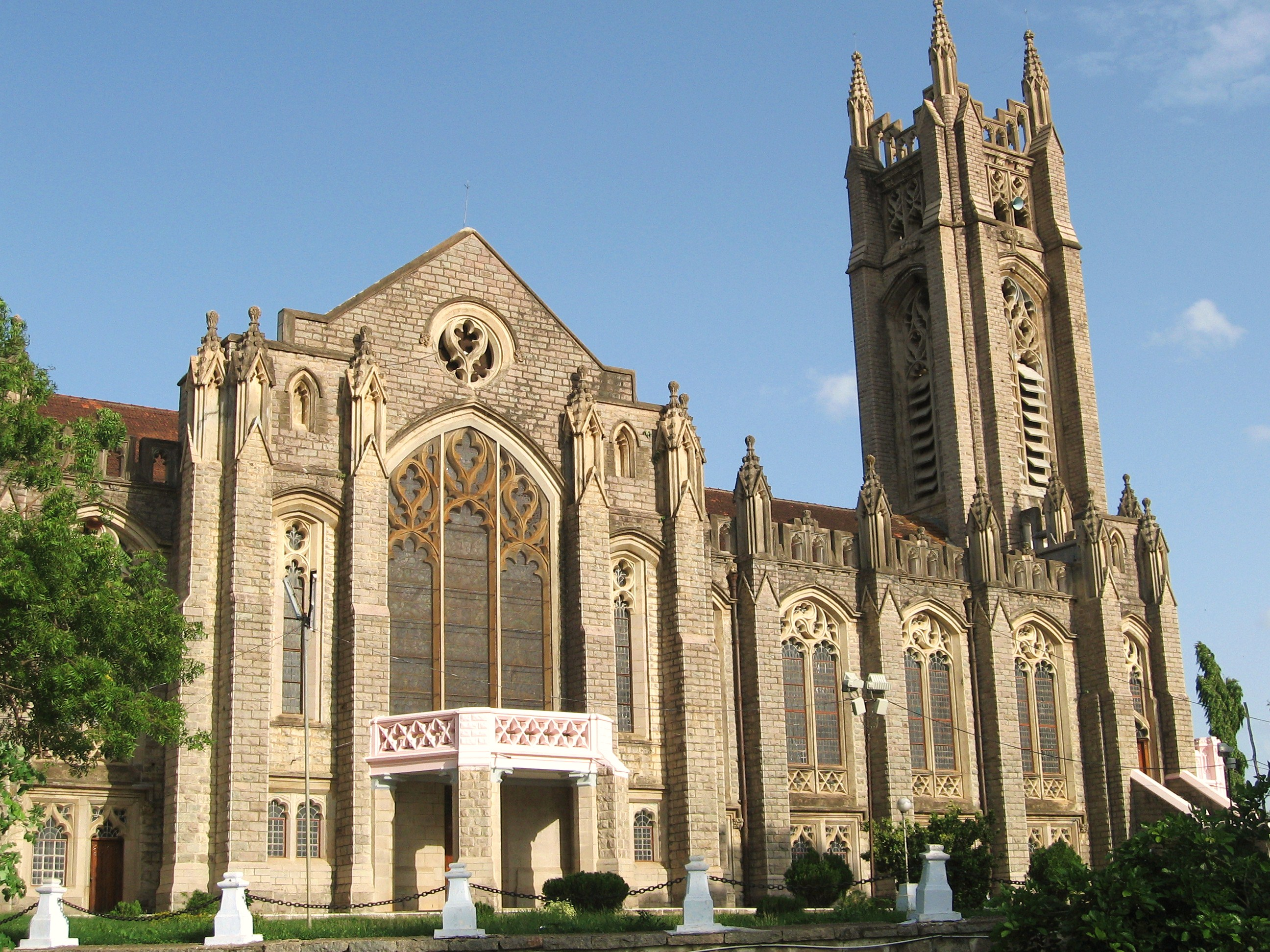
Medak Cathedral in Medak

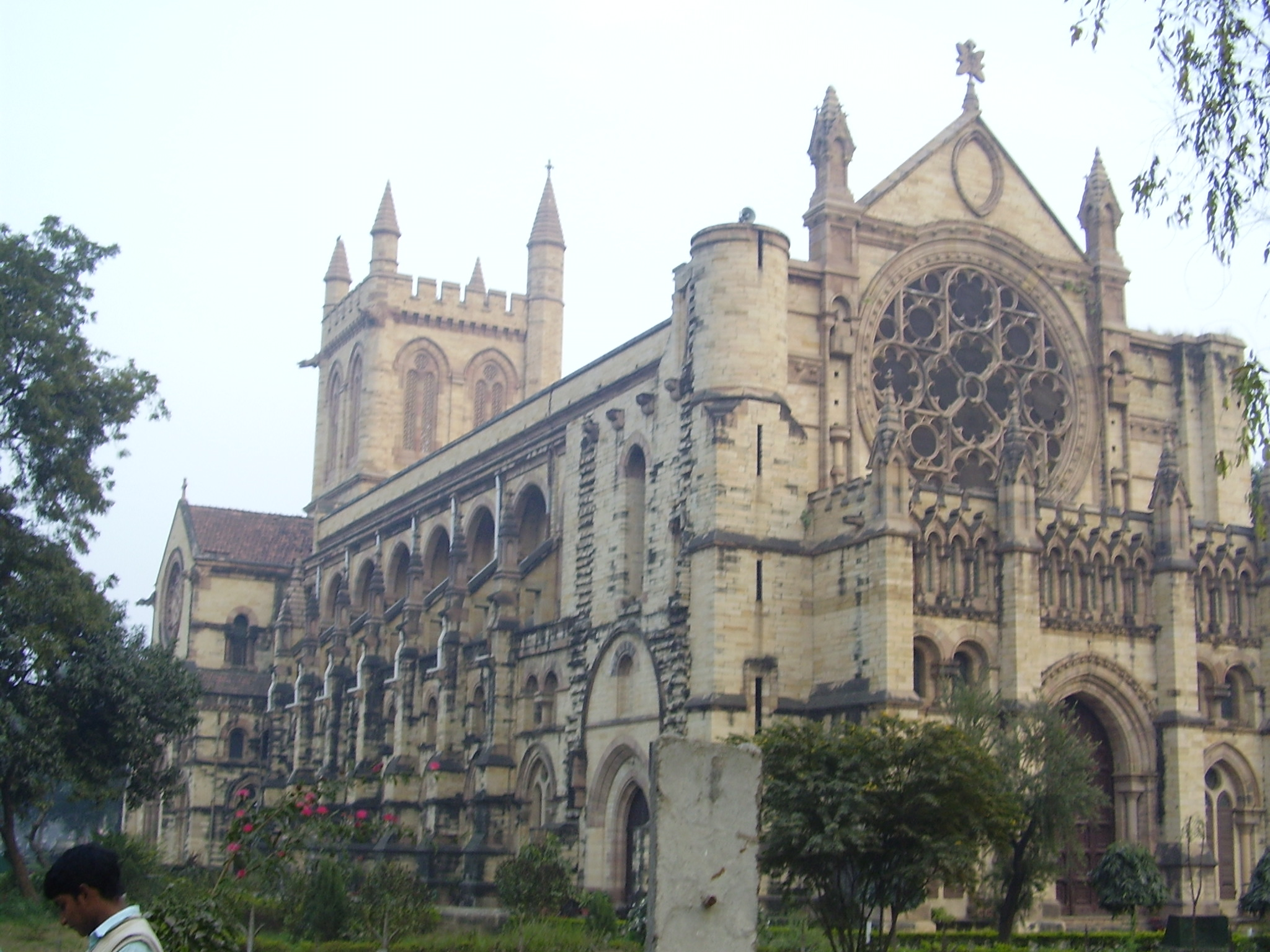
All Saints Cathedral, Allahabad

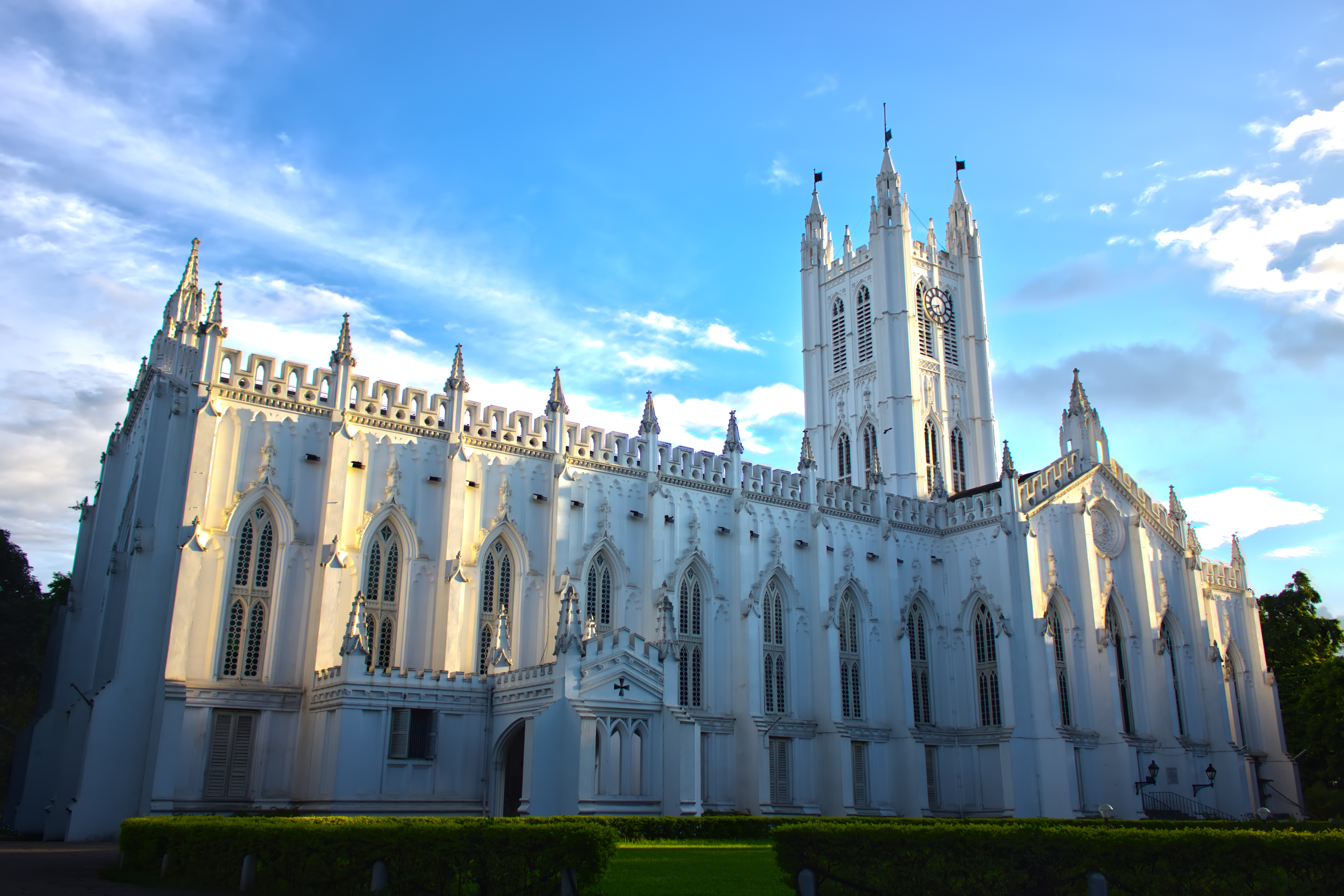
St. Paul's Cathedral in Calcutta

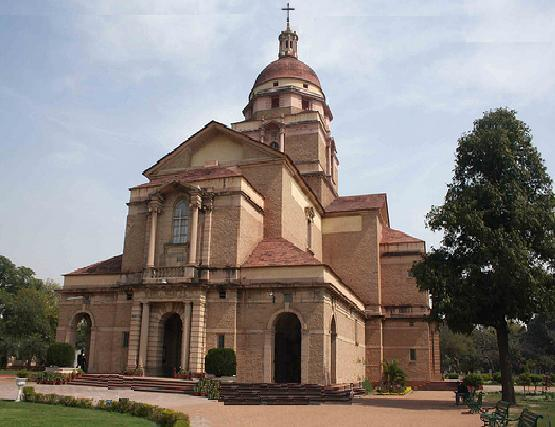
Cathedral Church of the Redemption in New Delhi

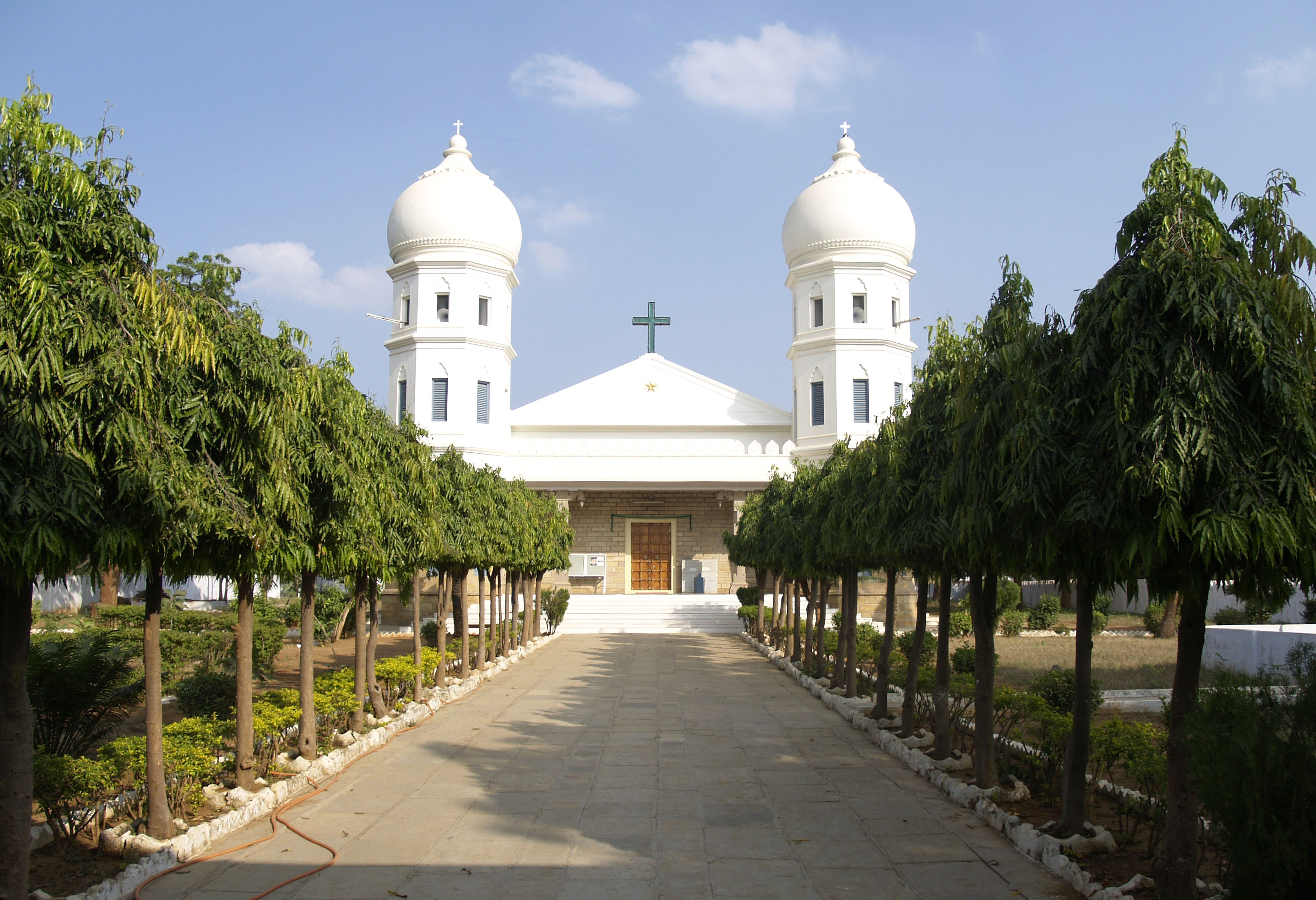
Epiphany Cathedral, Dornakal

=== Church of South India ===
Cathedrals of the Church of South India:

- St. George's Cathedral in Chennai
- Holy Trinity Cathedral in Tirunelveli
- St. Mark's Cathedral in Bangalore
- Shanthi Cathedral in Mangalore
- Holy Trinity Cathedral Church in Kottayam
- Christ Cathedral Church in Melukavu
- CSI Cathedral Church in Calicut
- CSI Cathedral Church, LMS compound in Thiruvananthapuram
- Epiphany Cathedral in Dornakal
- Holy Cross Cathedral in Nandyal
- Wesley Cathedral in Karimnagar
- Medak Cathedral in Medak
- St. Andrew's Cathedral in Machilipatnam
- St. John's Cathedral in Nazareth
- CSI Immanuel Cathedral in Kochi, Kerala

=== Church of North India ===
Cathedrals of the Church of North India:

- St. George's Cathedral in Sadar Bazaar, Agra
- St. Thomas Cathedral in Car Nicobar
- Christ Church Cathedral in Jabalpur
- St. Paul's Cathedral in Kolkata
- All Saints Cathedral in Allahabad
- All Saints Cathedral in Nagpur
- St. Saviour Cathedral in Ahmednagar
- St. Paul's Cathedral in Ranchi
- All Saints Cathedral in Shillong
- Christ Church Cathedral in Bhagalpur
- Christ Church Cathedral in Amritsar
- St. Thomas Cathedral in Bombay
- Cathedral Church of the Redemption in New Delhi
- St. Bartholomew Cathedral in Barrackpore
- St. Andrew's Cathedral in Darjeeling
- St. Paul's Cathedral in Poona

== Oriental Orthodox ==
=== Jacobite Syrian Christian Church ===
Cathedrals of the Jacobite Syrian Christian Church:

- St. Athanasiaus Cathedral, Puthencruz, Kerala

==== Angamaly Diocese ====
- Mount Sinai Mar Baselios Catholicate Cathedral, Kothamangalam, Cathedral of the Metropolitan of Angamaly Diocese (Diocese Headquarters)
- St. Mary's Jacobite Syrian Sonooro Cathedral, Angamaly, Kerala, Cathedral of the Bishop of Angamaly Region
- Mor Saboor and Mor Afroth Jacobite Syrian Cathedral, Akaparambu, Kerala,
- St. Mary's Jacobite Syrian Cathedral, Morakkala, Pallikkara, Kerala, Cathedral of Pallikkara Region
- Bethel Sulokho Jacobite Syrian Cathedral, Perumbavoor, Kerala
- St. Mary's Jacobite Syrian Cathedral, Kuruppampady, Cathedral of the bishop of Perumbavoor Region
- St. Thomas Jacobite Syrian Cathedral, Mazhuvannoor,
- Matha Mariyam Jacobite Syrian Cathedral Valiyapally, Kothamangalam, Kerala, Cathedral of the Bishop of Kothamangalam Region
- St. Mary's Jacobite Syrian Cathedral, Karakkunnam, Kerala, Cathedral of the Bishop of Muvattupuzha Region
- St. Mary's Jacobite Syrian Nercha Cathedral, Rakkad, Kerala
- St. George Jacobite Syrian Cathedral, Adimali, Cathedral of the bishop of Highrange Region

==== Kandanad Diocese ====
- St. George Cathedral, Kadakkanad (Diocesan Headquarters), Cathedral of the metropolitan of Kandanad.
- St. Mary's Jacobite Syrian Cathedral, Kandanad, Kerala, Mother Parish of the diocese Kandanad Region)
- St. Mary's Rajadhiraja Jacobite Syrian Cathedral, Piravom, Kerala one of the oldest Christian church in the world
- St. Peter's & St. Paul's Jacobite Syrian Cathedral, Neeramukal

==== Kochi Diocese ====
- Kyomtha Cathedral, Thiruvamkulam (Diocese Headquarters), Cathedral of the Metropolitan of Kochi
- Mar Thoma Jacobite Syrian Cathedral, Mulanthuruthy, Kerala
- St. George Jacobite Syrian Cathedral, Karingachira, Kerala.

==== Kottayam, Idukki Dioceses ====
- St. Joseph Jacobite Syrian Cathedral, Kottayam. Cathedral of the metropolitan of Kottayam
- Martha Mariyam Cathedral, Manarcad, Kerala of Manarcad Region
- St George Cathedral, Kattapana

==== Simhasa Churches ====
- St. Mary's Sonoro Cathedral, Elamkulam, Kerala of Ernakulam Region
- St. Peter's Jacobite Syrian Simhasana Cathedral, Thiruvananthapuram of Thiruvananthapuram Region
- Mor Ignatius Cathedral, Manjinikkara of Manjinikkara Region
- St. Ignatius Cathedral, Puthenangady of Kottayam Region

==== Knanaya Diocese ====
- Knanaya St. Johns Cathedral, Chingavanam, Kerala. Cathedral of the Archbishop of the Knanaya Archdiocese

==== North Kerala (Malabar, Kozhikode and Thrissur) ====
- St. Peter's & St. Paul's Jacobite Syrian Cathedral, Meenangadi, Cathedral of the Metropolitan of Malabar
- St. George Jacobite Syrian Patriarchal Cathedral Pulpally
- St. Mary's Jacobite Syrian Cathedral Calicut.Cathedral of the bishop of Calicut

==== South Kerala (Niranam, Thumbamon and Kollam) ====
- St. Mary's Cathedral, Kundara (traditional Parish)
- St. George Jacobite Syrian Cathedral, Kavumbhagam, Kerala (Niranam Diocese, Diocese Headquarters Cathedral of the Metropolitan of Niranam
- St. Mary's Jacobite Syrian Cathedral, Pathanamthitta (Thumbamon Diocesan Headquarters) Cathedral of the metropolitan of Thumbamon
- St. Thomas Jacobite Syrian Cathedral, Manthalir
- St. Mary's Jacobite Syrian Orthodox Cathedral, Vallikodu Kottayam, Pathanamthitta (Thumpamon Diocese)

==== Outside Kerala (Bangalore, Delhi, Mylapore, Mangalore, Mumbai) ====
- St. Mary's Jacobite Syrian Cathedral, Bangalore
- St. Peter's Jacobite Syrian Cathedral, New Delhi
- St. Gregorios Jacobite Cathedral, Mettuguda, Hyderabad
- St. Antony's Jacobite Syrian Cathedral, Jeppu, Mangalore, Karnataka

==== Evangelical Association ====
- St. George Jacobite Cathedral, Pulpally

=== Malankara Orthodox Syrian Church ===
Cathedrals of the Malankara Orthodox Syrian Church:

==== In Kerala ====
- Kadeesa Orthodox Cathedral, Kayamkulam, Kerala of Mavelikkara diocese
- Mar Elia Cathedral, Kottayam, Kerala of Kottayam Central Diocese
- St. George Orthodox Cathedral, Kunnakurady, Kerala of Angamaly Diocese
- St. George Orthodox Cathedral, Kozhikode, Kerala of Malabar Diocese
- St. George Orthodox Cathedral, Thiruvananthapuram, Kerala of Trivandrum diocese
- St. Ignatius Orthodox Cathedral, Chengannur, Kerala of Chengannur diocese
- St. Ignatius Orthodox Cathedral, Thrissur, Kerala of Thrissur diocese
- St. Ignatious Orthodox Cathedral, Kaipatoor, Kerala of Thumpamon diocese
- St. John's Orthodox Cathedral, Pampady, Kerala of Kottayan diocese
- St. Mary's Orthodox Cathedral, Mulakulam, Kerala of Kandanad West diocese
- St. Mary's Orthodox Cathedral, Kandanad, Kerala of Kandanad West diocese
- St. Mary's Orthodox Cathedral, Puthencavu, of Chengannur diocese, Kerala
- St. Mary's Orthodox Cathedral, Puthiyakavu, Kerala of Mavelikkara diocese
- St. Mary's Orthodox Cathedral, Niranam, Kerala of Niranam diocese
- St. Mary's Orthodox Cathedral, Sulthanbathery, Kerala of Sultan Bathery diocese
- St. Mary's Orthodox Cathedral, Thumpamon, Kerala of Thumpamon diocese
- St. Mary's Orthodox Cathedral, Ernakulam, Kerala of Kochi diocese
- St. Mary's Orthodox Cathedral, Pazhanji, Kerala of Kunnamkulam diocese
- St. Mary's Orthodox Cathedral, Arthat, Kerala of Kunnamkulam Diocese
- St. Stephens Orthodox Cathedral,[(Makkamkunnu, Pathanamthitta)], Kerala, Thumpamon Diocese
- St. Stephen's Orthodox Cathedral, Kudassanad, Kerala of Chengannur diocese
- St. Thomas Orthodox Cathedral, Kadampanad, Kerala of Adoor-Kadampanad diocese
- St. Thomas Orthodox Cathedral, Kannamkode, Adoor, Kerala of Adoor-Kadampanad diocese
- St. Thomas Orthodox Cathedral, Kungiripetty, Kerala of Idukki diocese
- St. Thomas Orthodox Cathedral, Kollam, Kerala of Kollam Diocese
- St. Thomas Orthodox Cathedral, Karthikappally, Kerala of Mavelikkara diocese
- St. Thomas Orthodox Cathedral, Muvattupuzha, Kerala of Kandanad East diocese
- St Thomas Orthodox Cathedral, Thottomon, Ranny, Kerala of Nilackal diocese

==== Outside Kerala ====
- St. Antony's Orthodox Syrian Cathedral Brahmavar, Karnataka
- St. Gregorios Orthodox Cathedral, Bangalore, Karnataka
- Mar Gregorios Cathedral, Bhilai, Chhattisgarh
- St. Thomas Orthodox Cathedral, Broadway, Chennai, Tamil Nadu
- St. George Orthodox Cathedral, Nagpur, Maharashtra
- St. Thomas Orthodox Cathedral, Bhopal, Madhya Pradesh
- St. Thomas Orthodox Cathedral, Kolkata, West Bengal
- St. Mary's Orthodox Cathedral, Ahmedabad, Gujarat
- St. Mary's Orthodox Cathedral, Dadar, Maharashtra
- St. Mary's Orthodox Cathedral, Brahmavar, Karnataka
- St. Mary's Orthodox Cathedral, Hauz Khas, Delhi
- St. Mary's Orthodox Cathedral, Port Blair, Andaman
- St. Mary's Orthodox Cathedral, Coimbatore, Tamil Nadu
- St. Gregorios Orthodox Cathedral, Hyderabad, Andhra Pradesh

== See also ==
- List of cathedrals
- Christianity in India
- List of Catholic dioceses in India
- List of Catholic bishops of India
- List of basilicas in India
- Territories of Catholic dioceses in India
