= Kannikadass William Antony =

Indian Roman Catholic prelate

His Excellency Kannikadass William Antony
- Bishop emeritus of Mysore
- Diocese: Diocese of Mysore
- Appointed: 25 January 2017
- Term ended: 13 January 2024
- Predecessor: Thomas Anthony Vazhapilly
- Successor: Francis Serrao

Orders
- Ordination: 18 May 1993 by Ignatius Pinto
- Consecration: 27 February 2017 by Thomas Anthony Vazhapilly

Personal details
- Born: 27 February 1965 (age 61) Pollibetta, Karnataka, India
- Denomination: Roman Catholic

Ordination history of Kannikadass William Antony
History
Diaconal ordination
- Ordained by: Francis Michelappa
Priestly ordination
- Ordained by: Ignatius Pinto
Episcopal consecration
- Principal consecrator: Thomas Anthony Vazhapilly
- Co-consecrators: Bernard Blasius Moras; Anthony Swamy Thomasappa

Kannikadass William Antony (born 27 February 1965) is an Indian Roman Catholic prelate, who is currently bishop emeritus of Mysore. Antony’s resignation was officially accepted by Pope Francis in January 2024, following a series of allegations against him, including accusations of sexual misconduct, financial impropriety, and other controversies during his tenure. He now holds the title of bishop emeritus of Mysore. Retired Archbishop Bernard Moras was appointed to serve as apostolic administrator of the diocese after his resignation.

== Early life ==
Msgr. Antony was born on 27 February 1965 in Pollibetta, Mysore. He was the only son of M. G. Antony and J. Philomena. He completed his primary and secondary education at Good Shepherd School, St. Mary’s School, and St. Philomena’s High School, all located in Mysore.

After completing his secondary education, he entered St. Mary’s Minor Seminary in Bannimantap, Mysore, and simultaneously enrolled at St. Philomena’s College in Mysore. Later, he completed his bachelor's degree in Philosophy and a year of Regency at St. Antony’s Shrine Dornahalli, K. R. Nagar before moving to St. Peter’s Pontifical Seminary in Bangalore to pursue his theological studies.

He completed his master’s degree in Canon Law from St. Peter’s Pontifical Institute in Bangalore and also acquired a bachelor's degree in Education and a master's degree in Christianity from the University of Mysore.

== Priesthood ==
In 1992, Antony was ordained as a deacon by Francis Michelappa, the then Bishop of Mysore, and a year later, on 18 May 1993, he was ordained as a priest for the Diocese of Mysore by Ignatius Pinto, the Archbishop Emeritus of Bangalore and the then Bishop of Shimoga.

== Episcopate ==
Fr. Antony was appointed as the Bishop of Mysore on 26 January 2017. He succeeded Bishop Thomas Vazhapilly, who retired after reaching the canonical age of retirement. He received his episcopal consecration and was installed on Monday, 27 February 2017 at the Cathedral of St. Joseph and St. Philomena, Mysuru. He has also been actively involved in the education sector, particularly in the development of schools and colleges.

On 7 January 2023, bishop Antony took a period of absence from the Diocese of Mysore. It was announced that the Archbishop Emeritus of Bangalore, Bernard Moras was appointed as Apostolic Administrator of the Diocese of Mysore by the Vatican Dicastery for Evangelization.

== Controversies ==
Bishop Antony has been at the center of several controversies during his tenure as the leader of the Diocese of Mysore. Accusations of sexual misconduct, corruption, kidnapping, and collusion in murder have all been leveled against him. In 2019, 37 priests in the Mysore diocese wrote to the Vatican demanding Antony’s resignation, citing his fathering of children from various affairs, connections to corrupt officials, and ties to organized crime.

The Holy See launched an investigation in February 2021, which was prompted by the 2019 letter and additional charges from a group of 113 people, including 22 priests. In April 2022, 11 priests and one layperson from the Mysore traveled to New Delhi to plead for Antony’s ouster. In July of the same year, another Mysore priest, Father Gnana Prakash, lodged additional charges against Antony, including complicity in the deaths of four priests who signed the 2019 letter.

Despite the mounting allegations against him, bishop Antony has denied all charges and claimed that some priests were trying to derail his reform efforts. The Vatican placed Antony on administrative leave effective 7 January 2023. Antony retains full priestly faculties, allowing him to celebrate Mass and perform other sacraments in accordance with Church norms.

== See also ==
- List of Catholic bishops of India
