= St Francis Assisi Church (Tallur) =

St. Francis Assisi Church
- St. Francis Assisi Church, Tallur
- Tallur Church
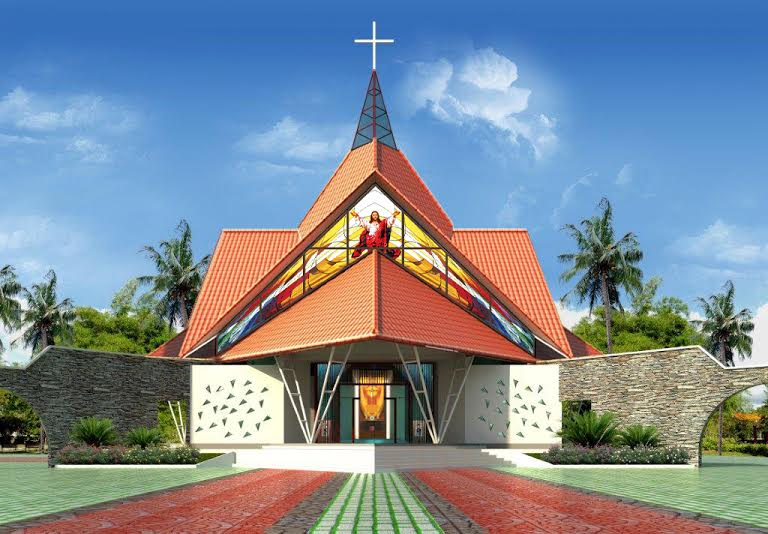
- Location: Tallur, Kundapur, Karnataka
- Country: India
- Denomination: Catholic Church
- Website: assisichurch.com

History
- Status: Church
- Founder: Late Rev Fr. Peter Remegias D’Souza

Architecture
- Functional status: Active
- Architect: Sandeep Almeida
- Architectural type: Modern, star-shaped
- Years built: 2013
- Groundbreaking: December 2013
- Completed: 2016
- Construction cost: Rs. 7,00,00,000

Specifications
- Capacity: 500
- Width: 143 ft (44 m)
- Height: 113 ft (34 m)

Administration
- District: Udupi
- Province: Karnataka
- Archdiocese: Roman Catholic Archdiocese of Bangalore
- Diocese: Roman Catholic Diocese of Udupi
- Parish: Tallur

Clergy
- Archbishop: Bernard Moras
- Bishop: Gerald Isaac Lobo

Saint Francis Assisi is a Catholic church in the village of Tallur. Originally built in 1934, it was renovated during Fr. Sunil Veigas's service tenure into a star-shaped structure and re-inaugurated in May 2016.

== History ==
Before 1929 there were no churches for local Catholics so the congregants from and around Tallur village thronged the Holy Rosary Catholic Church. Later Rev Fr. Peter Remegias D’Souza in 1928 purchased land in Tallur and simultaneously constructed a small hut. There was a plea from the congregants to set up a separate church at Tallur. After this demand was approved in the parish-level meeting, the church was built in 1934, and got its first-ever priest by the name of Fr. Edward Lobo.

== Architect ==
The foundation stone for the proposed new building was laid on 20 October 2012. ‘Shilpi’ architects based in Kerala designed the church building. Sandeep Almeida from the town began to serve as the engineer. From outside this building looks like a star. The church has entrances from three sides through similar doors. The windows have been placed in such a way that they allow abundant light and air to enter the building. The building is 143 feet wide and 113 feet high with a total area of 10,800 square feet. A spacious altar has been erected. The whole church has a single fan. Glass is used in 40 per cent of the building. Modern monitor tiles have also been used. Glass has also been used for the outer walls. The flooring is made of granite slabs.

== Re-inauguration ==
The church was re-inaugurated by Gerald Isaac Lobo Bishop of Udupi Diocese on 12 May 2016. He had also offered the first Eucharistic service in the new church. An honouring function was held after the holy mass. Vinay Kumar Sorake, the then Minister of Urban Development and District, Fr Anil D’Souza, Dean Kundapur Deanery and others attended as chief guests for the ceremony.

== Association ==
The church hosts the local Catholic Sabha, St Vincent De Paul Organization, Franciscan Organization, Young Christian Students Association and Altar Boys Association with 18 committees.
