= Diocese of Belgaum =

Roman Catholic diocese in Karnataka, India

Coordinates: 15.8540°N 74.5025°E

Diocese of Belgaum Dioecesis Belgaumensis ಬೆಳಗಾವಿ ಧರ್ಮಕ್ಷೇತ್ರ
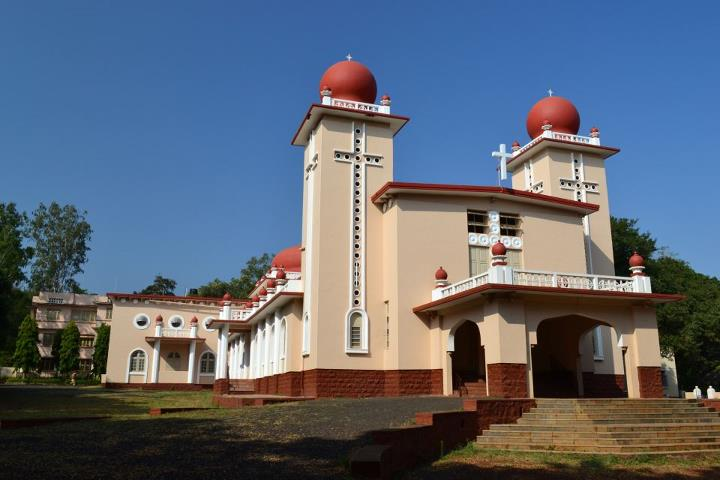
- Cathedral of Belgaum

Location
- Country: India
- Ecclesiastical province: Bangalore
- Metropolitan: Bangalore

Statistics
- Area: 33,747 km^{2} (13,030 sq mi)
- Population: Total; Catholics: (as of 2012); 10,736,000; 30,512 (0.3%)
- Parishes: 67

Information
- Rite: Latin Rite
- Cathedral: Cathedral of Our Lady of the Family Rosary of Fatima in Belgaum

Current leadership
- Pope: Leo XIV
- Bishop: Derek Fernandes
- Metropolitan Archbishop: Peter Machado

Website
- Website of the Diocese

The Roman Catholic Diocese of Belgaum (Latin: Belgaumen(sis)) is a diocese located in the city of Belgaum in the ecclesiastical province of Bangalore in India.

== History ==
The Belgaum Diocese was erected on 19 September 1953 by the papal bull Summa illa Sollicitudo of Pope Pius XII. Two civil districts of Belgaum and North Kanara were separated from the Archdiocese of Goa and two other civil districts of Dharwad and Bijapur were taken from the Diocese of Pune in forming the Diocese of Belgaum.

The most Rev. Dr. Michael Rodrigues was appointed the first bishop. By the papal bull Christi Missium of Paul VI, the North Kanara District was separated from the Belgaum Diocese to form the Karwar Diocese on 24 January 1976.

It now consists of the civil districts of Belgaum, Bijapur, Bagalkot, Dharwad, Gadag and Haveri in Karnataka State and the Chandgad taluka in Kolhapur District of Maharashtra State.

The mother parish of the diocese is known as the Cathedral of Our Lady of the Family Rosary of Fatima, or Fatima Cathedral for short. It is located in the cantonment area of Belgaum and is a prominent landmark. The rector of the parish is currently Rev. Fr. Victor.

== Leadership ==
Bishops of Belgaum (Latin Rite)

- Bishop Michael Rodrigues (19 September 1953 – 15 March 1964)
- Bishop Fortunato da Veiga Coutinho (15 March 1964 – 8 February 1967)
- Bishop Ignatius P. Lobo (26 September 1967 – 1 December 1994)
- Bishop Bernard Blasius Moras (later Archbishop) (30 November 1996 – 22 July 2004)
- Bishop Peter Machado (later Archbishop) (2 February 2006 – 30 May 2018)
- Bishop Derek Fernandes(1 May 2019 – Present)
