= Diocese of Bellary =

Latin Catholic diocese in India

Coordinates: 15.1403°N 76.8992°E

Diocese of Bellary Dioecesis Bellaryensis

Location
- Country: India
- Ecclesiastical province: Bangalore

Statistics
- Area: 24,973 km^{2} (9,642 sq mi)
- Population: Total; Catholics: (as of 2014); 6,172,289; 30,718 (0.6%)
- Parishes: 47

Information
- Denomination: Catholic Church
- Sui iuris church: Latin Church
- Rite: Roman Rite
- Cathedral: St Anthony's Cathedral in Bellary
- Patron saint: St Anthony of Padua

Current leadership
- Pope: Leo XIV
- Bishop: Henry D'Souza
- Metropolitan Archbishop: Peter Machado

Map
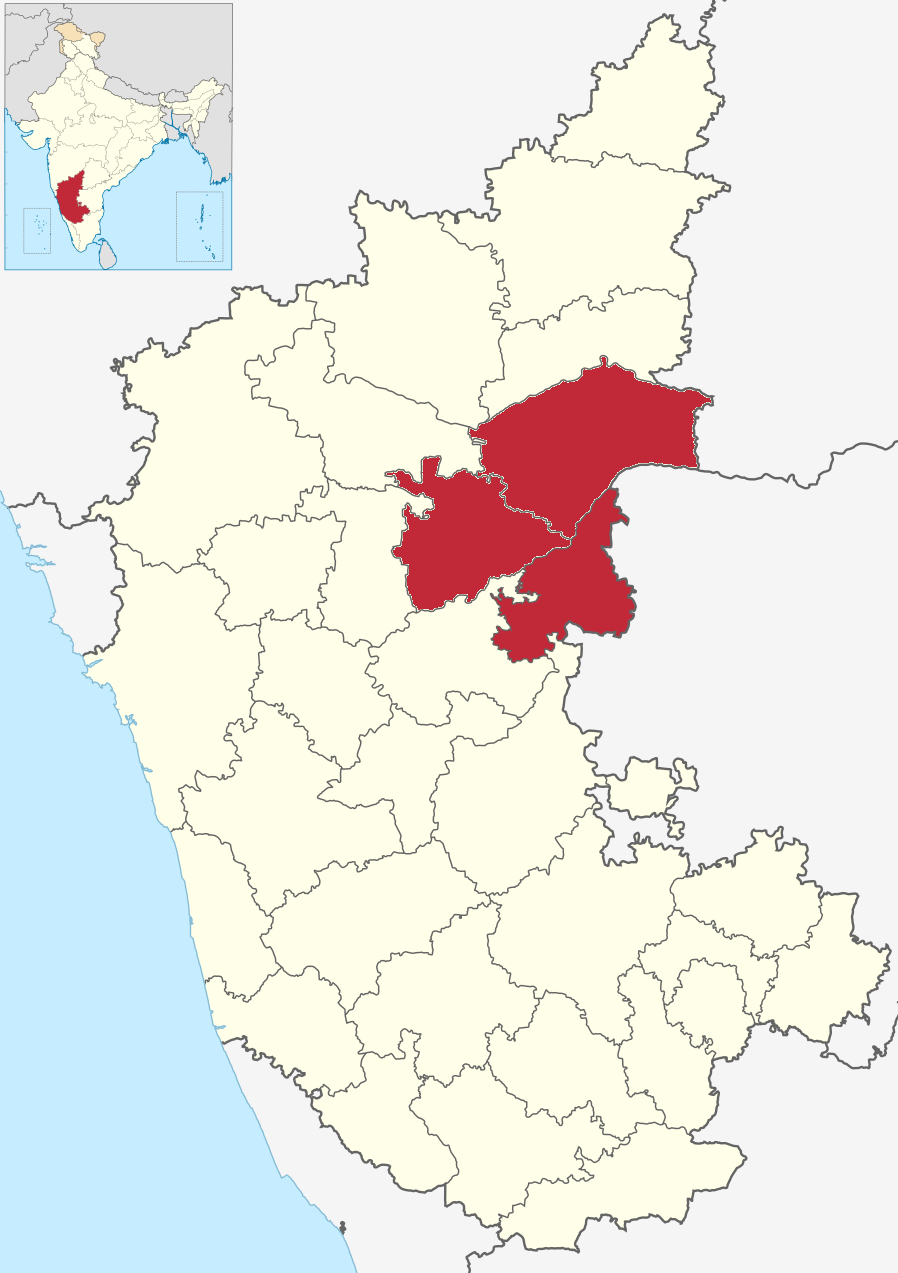

Website
- Website of the Diocese

The Diocese of Bellary (Latin: Bellaryen(sis)) is a Latin Church ecclesiastical territory or diocese of the Catholic Church in India. Its episcopal see is Bellary. The diocese is a suffragan in the ecclesiastical province of the metropolitan Archdiocese of Bangalore.

== History ==
- 15 June 1928: Established as Mission "sui iuris" of Bellary from the Diocese of Hyderabad and Archdiocese of Madras
- 10 March 1949: Promoted as Diocese of Bellary

== Ordinaries ==
- Ecclesiastical superiors
  - Fr. John Forest Hogan, O.F.M. (later Bishop) (1934 – 10 March 1949)
  - Fr. Ernesto Reilly, O.F.M. (1928 – 1934)
- Bishops
  - Bishop Henry D'Souza (15 March 2008 – present)
  - Archbishop Bernard Blasius Moras (Apostolic Administrator 18 November 2006 – 15 March 2008)
  - Bishop Joseph D'Silva (6 October 1992 – 17 November 2006)
  - Bishop Ambrose Papaiah Yeddanapalli, O.F.M. (10 December 1963 – 1992)
  - Bishop John Forest Hogan, O.F.M. (10 March 1949 – 23 September 1962)

== Saints and causes for canonisation ==
- Servant of God Msgr. Francis Xavier Kroot, MHM
