= St. Francis Xavier's Cathedral, Bengaluru =

St. Francis Xavier's Cathedral
- ಸೇಂಟ್ ಫ್ರಾನ್ಸಿಸ್ ಕ್ಸೇವಿಯರ್ ಕ್ಯಾಥೆಡ್ರಲ್
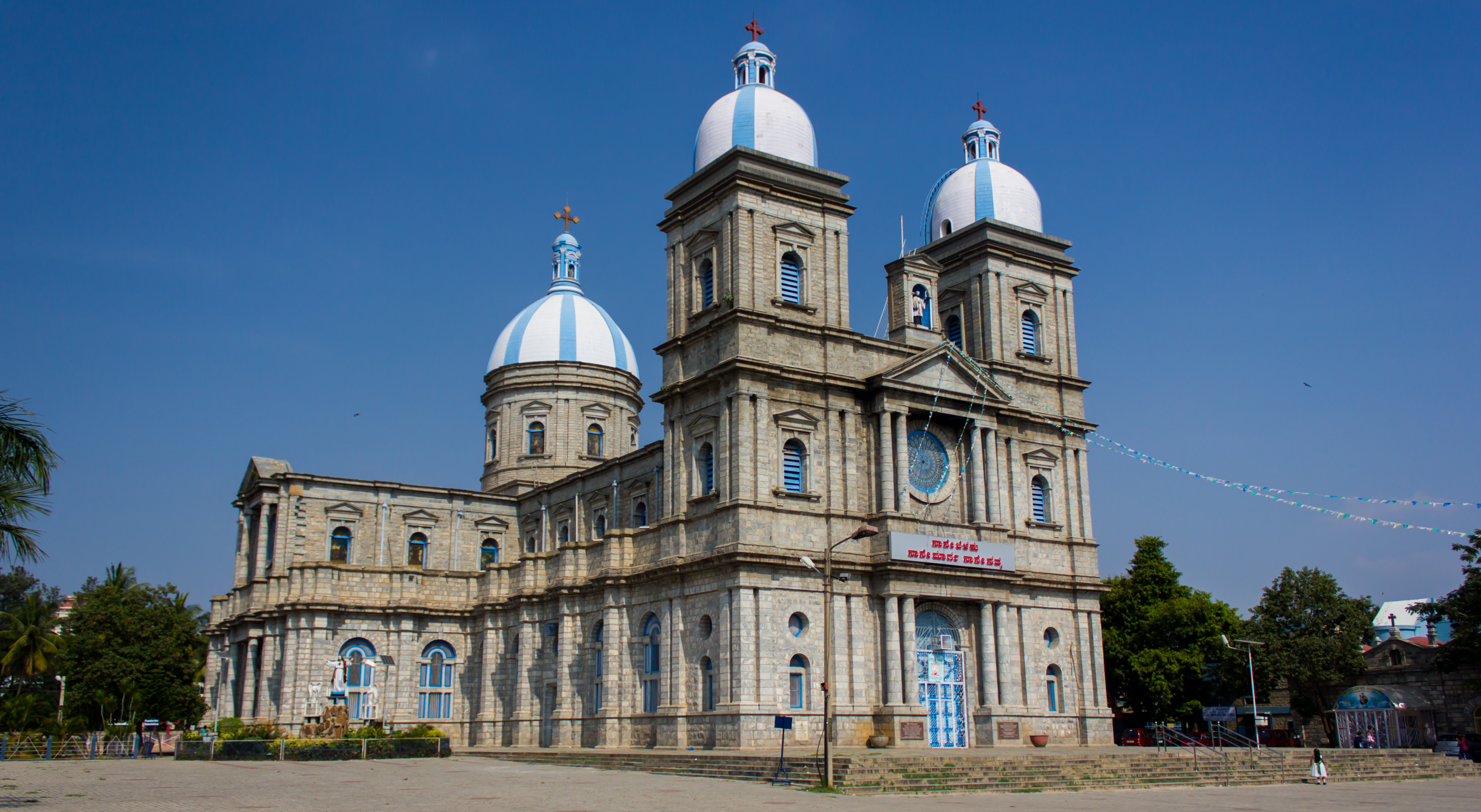
- St. Francis Xavier's Cathedral

- Cleveland Town Bangalore St. Francis Xavier's Cathedral (India)
- 12.992679°N 77.611314°E
- Location: Cleveland Town, Bangalore Urban
- Country: India
- Denomination: Roman Catholic
- Website: www.bangalorearchdiocese.org

History
- Status: Cathedral
- Founded: 1851
- Dedication: St. Francis Xavier

Architecture
- Functional status: active

Administration
- Province: Archdiocese of Bangalore
- Archdiocese: Archdiocese of Bangalore

Clergy
- Archbishop: Very Rev. Dr. Peter Machado

St. Francis Xavier's Cathedral is the cathedral of the Roman Catholic Archdiocese of Bangalore in India. Initially, Bangalore was the seat of the diocese of Mysore from 1886 to 1940 and during this time, St. Patrick's church in Bangalore was the cathedral of the diocese. When the diocese of Mysore was bifurcated on 13 February 1940 to form the diocese of Bangalore, St. Francis Xavier's church was chosen as its cathedral.

The first church of St. Francis Xavier was constructed in 1851 by French missionaries of the Paris Foreign Missions Society. Due to the huge increase in the catholic population, this church eventually became inadequate. Hence in 1911, the foundation stone was laid for a new church. This church was inaugurated on 26 May 1932, which would become a cathedral in 1940. Two new domes of the facade were inaugurated on its platinum jubilee in the year 2009. Bangalore archbishop Bernard Moras re-dedicated the cathedral to St. Francis Xavier. The domes had been constructed along with several other renovations. Though they were part of the original plan of the cathedral, they could not be completed due to lack of funds.

The cathedral's large compound has three schools: St. Aloysius', St. Anthony's and St. Rock's. There is also a Shrine dedicated to St. Anthony.

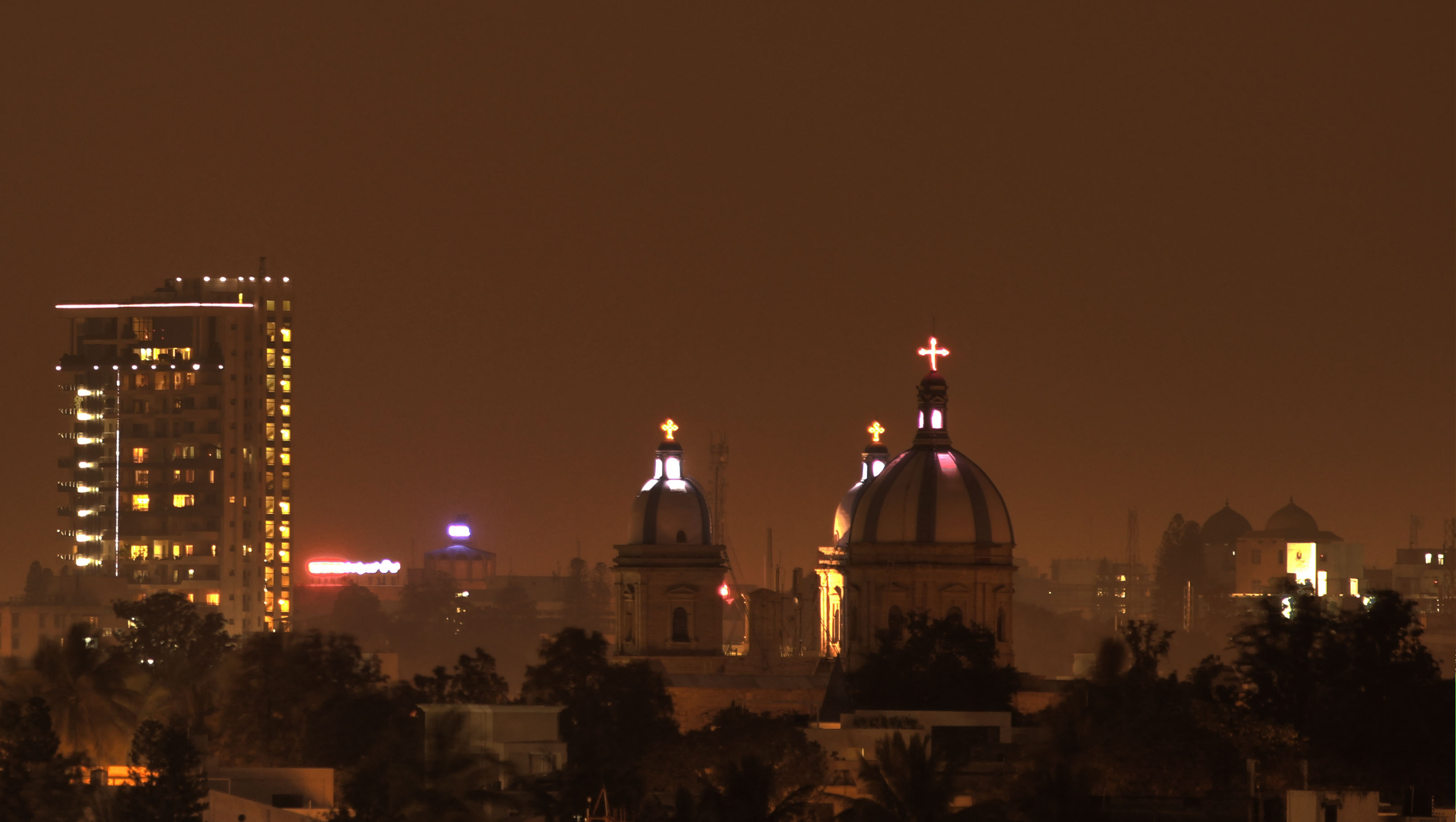
Domes and crosses of the St. Francis Xavier's Cathedral seen against the Bangalore skyline

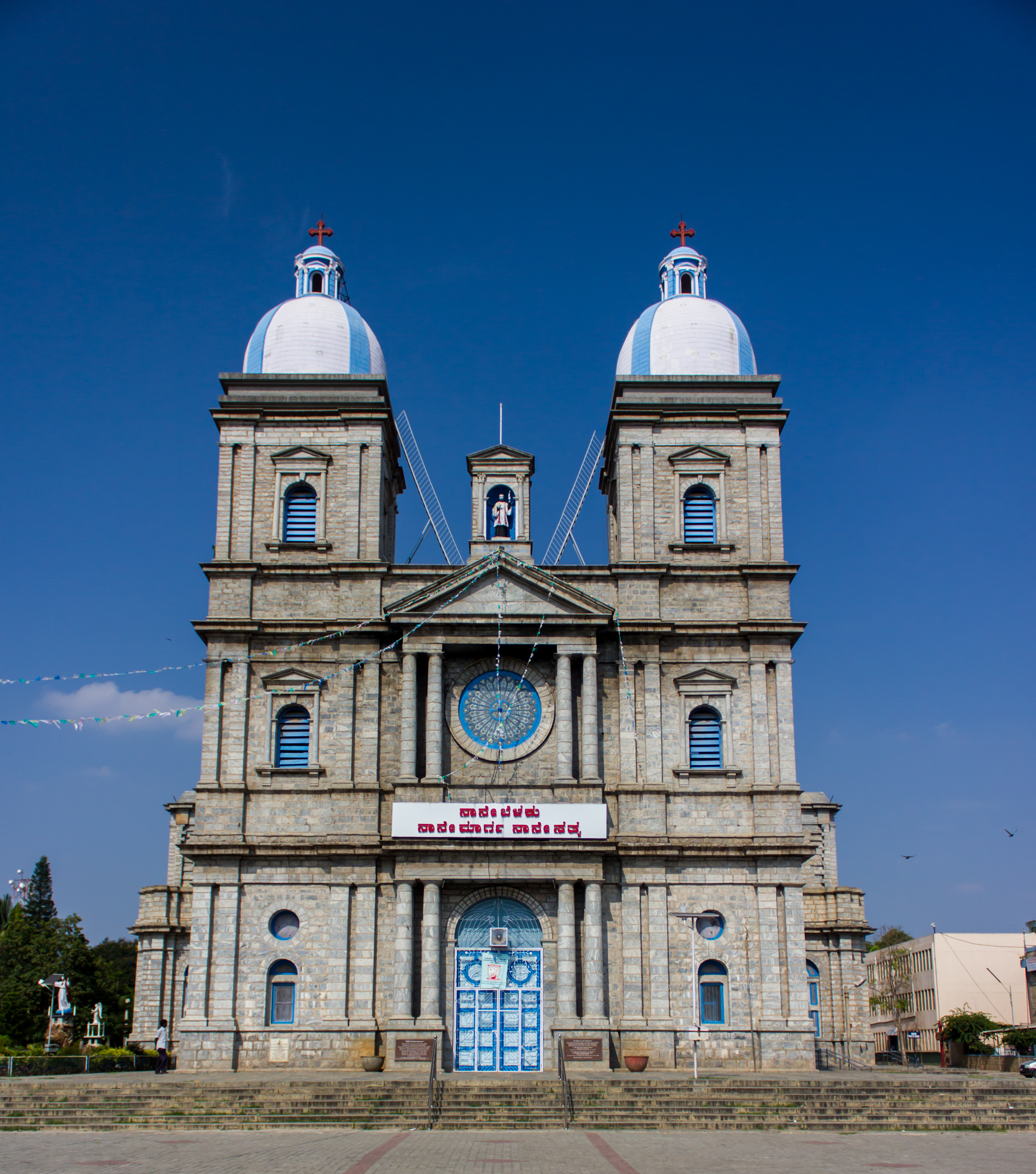
St. Francis Xavier's Cathedral
