= Infant Jesus Church, Bengaluru =

Infant Jesus Church, Bangalore
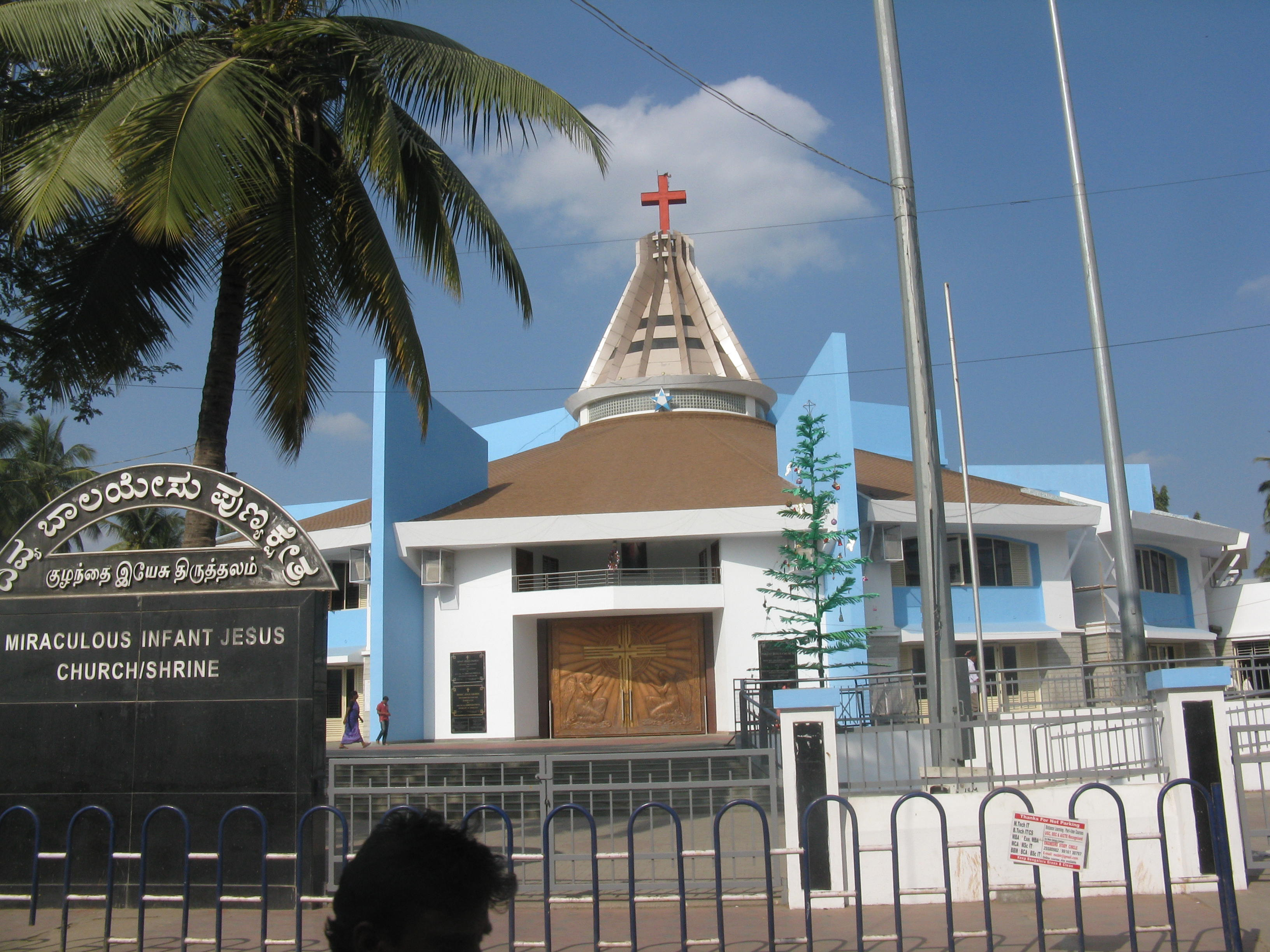
- Infant Jesus Church, Bangalore
- Infant Jesus Church, Bangalore
- 12.9537°N 77.6187°E
- Location: Vivek Nagar Bangalore Urban
- Country: India
- Denomination: Roman Catholic
- Website: www.infantjesusshrine.com

History
- Status: Church
- Founded: 18 April 1969; 57 years ago
- Events: Feast Day: 14 January

Architecture
- Functional status: Active
- Architect(s): K. Thomas and Associates
- Completed: 9 June 2005

Administration
- Archdiocese: Archdiocese of Bangalore

Clergy
- Archbishop: Peter Machado
- Rector: Fr Michael Antony (also Parish Priest)

Infant Jesus Church is a Roman Catholic church in Bangalore. Established in 1971, in Neelasandra near Vivek Nagar area of Bangalore, the church is dedicated to Infant Jesus. It is known as the Infant Jesus Shrine and was built to commemorate the historic Infant Jesus of Prague; since then numerous miracles have been attributed to the shrine leading to its increasing popularity. A new church building adjacent to the old building was added in 2005.

== History ==
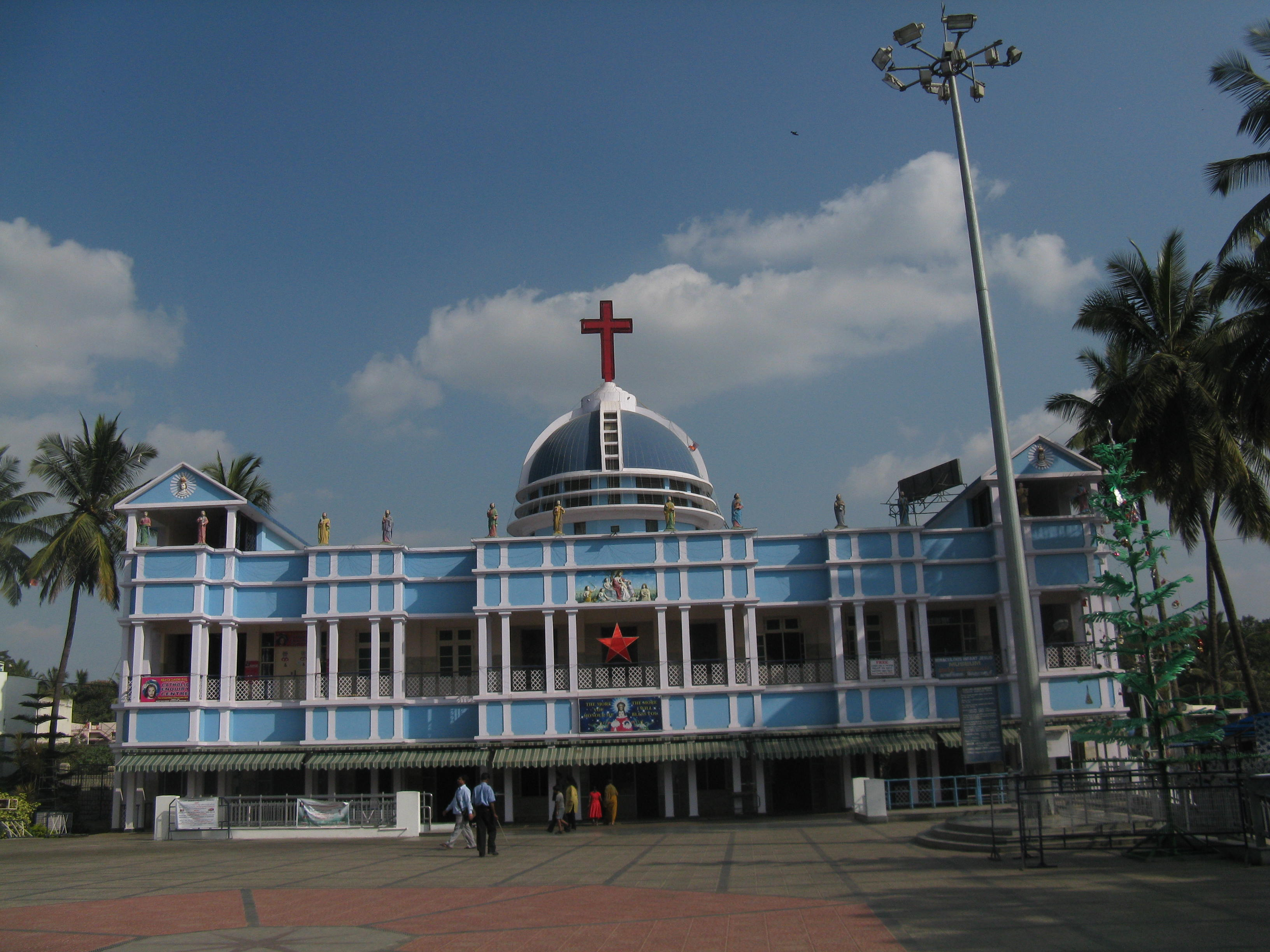
Adjacent Infant Jesus Shrine building

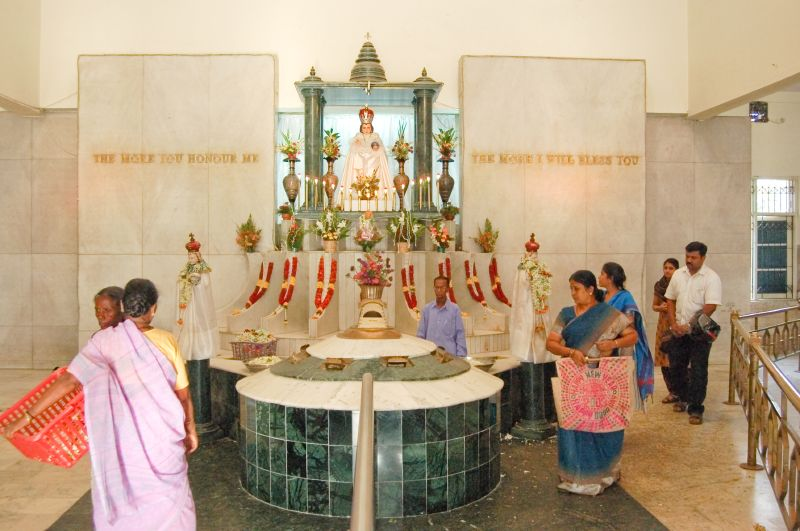
The Infant Jesus Shrine inside

The foundation of the Infant Jesus Church was laid on 18 April 1969, by Rev. Duraisamy Simon Lourdusamy, the then Archbishop of Bangalore.

Thereafter, in May 1971, Rev. Fr. L. Peter after being appointed the first parish priest, brought the statue of Infant Jesus from Sacred Heart Church, Bangalore and started a tent church at the site. The congregation continued thus for the next eight years, and finally the church building was inaugurated on 29 June 1979, by Rev. Dr. D. S. Lourduswamy, who had then become Secretary of the Congregation for the Evangelization of Peoples in Rome.

The present church building was inaugurated on 9 June 2005, by Rev. Dr. Bernard Moras, Archbishop of Bangalore, and dedicated by Rev. Dr. Pedro López Quintana, Apostolic Nuncio to India. It has a fan shaped hall, which seats 2500 people, and was designed by K. Thomas and Associates, Bangalore. The central mural of the church replicates the nativity scene at the Church of the Nativity in Bethlehem.

The popularity of the church grew sharply after the miracles of the shrine. The prayer to Infant Jesus is recited during hardships. They took the Tamil film, Kuzhanthai Yesu (1984), starring Saritha, Rajesh, Vijayakanth and comedian Senthil. Over the years, the Thursday Mass at the church has grown in audience and today it is frequented by 10,000 people from various religions, and on the day, the church holds seven Masses in different languages.

Each year on 14 January, the annual feast day at the Church, being celebrated since 1971 sees thousands of people visit the church, while hundreds more gather around it, to watch the ceremonies.
