= Diocese of Shimoga =

Latin Catholic diocese in India

Coordinates: 13.9329°N 75.5798°E

Diocese of Shimoga Dioecesis Shimogaensis ಶಿವಮೊಗ್ಗ ಧರ್ಮಕ್ಷೇತ್ರ
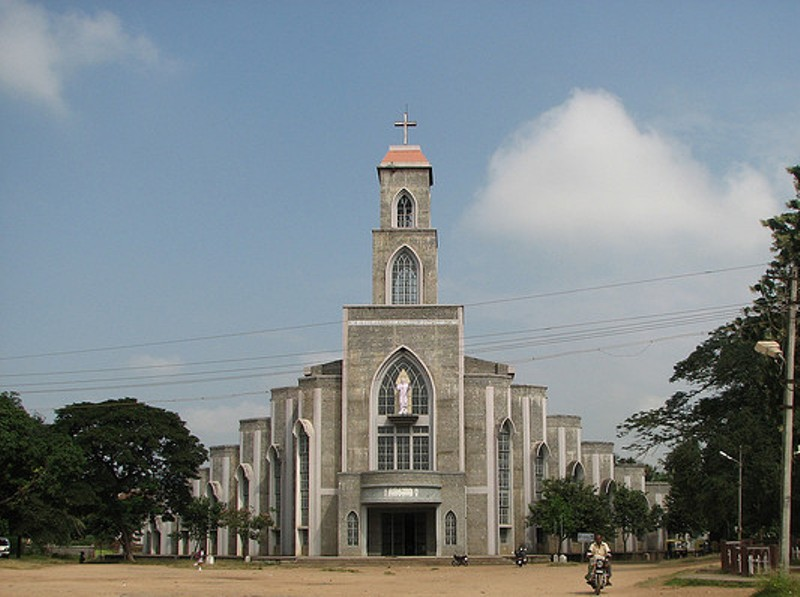
- Sacred Heart Cathedral

Location
- Country: India
- Ecclesiastical province: Bangalore

Statistics
- Area: 22,893 km^{2} (8,839 sq mi)
- Population: Total; Catholics: (as of 2023); 5,362,795; 17,944 (0.3%)
- Parishes: 21

Information
- Denomination: Catholic Church
- Sui iuris church: Latin Church
- Rite: Roman Rite
- Established: 14 November 1988; 37 years ago
- Cathedral: Sacred Heart Cathedral in Shimoga
- Patron saint: Sacred Heart of Jesus
- Secular priests: 88 (46 Diocesan, 42 Religious Orders)

Current leadership
- Pope: Leo XIV
- Bishop: sede vacante
- Metropolitan Archbishop: Peter Machado
- Apostolic Administrator: Duming Dias

Map
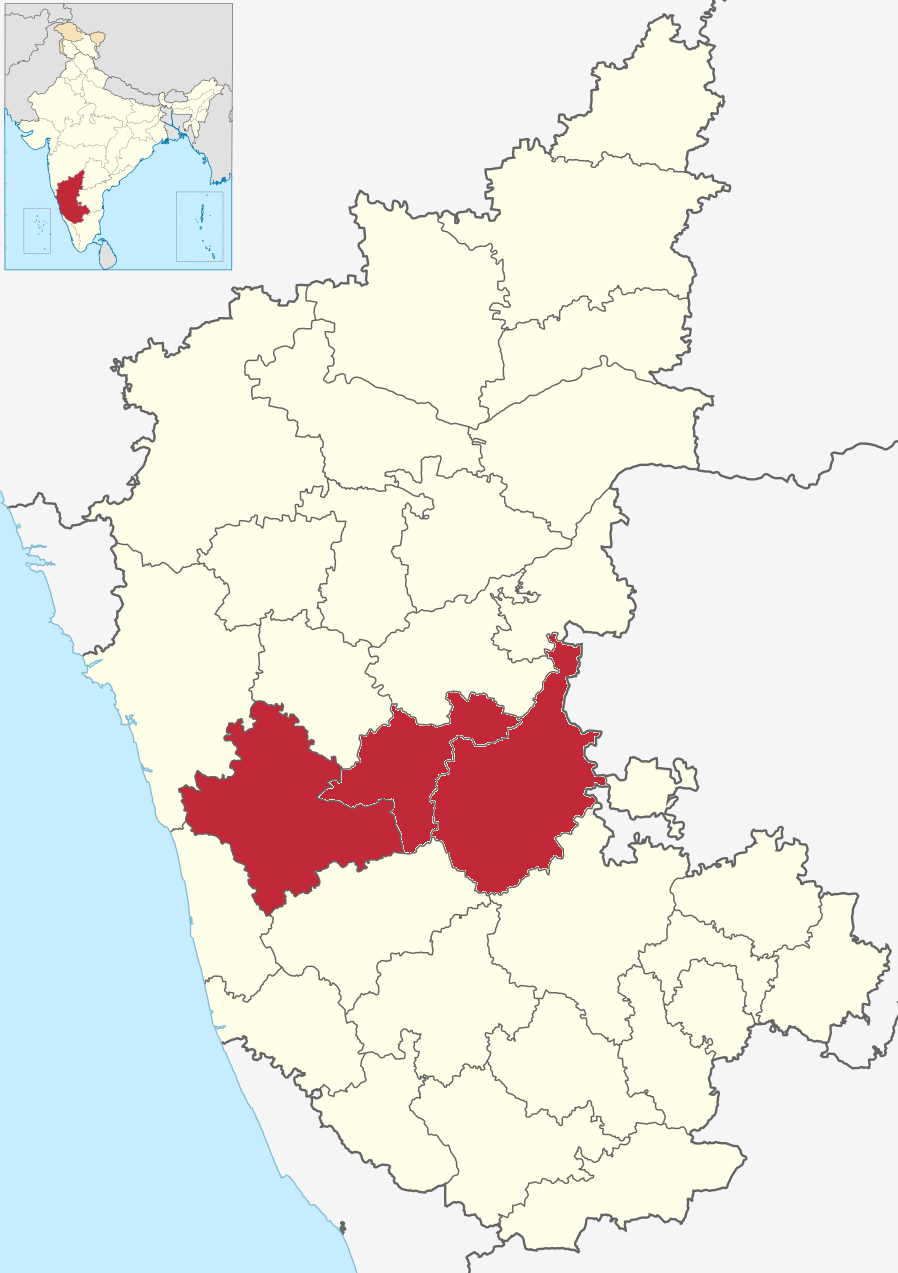

Website
- Website of the Diocese

The Diocese of Shimoga (Latin: Shimogaen(sis)) is a Latin Church ecclesiastical jurisdiction or diocese of the Catholic Church in India. Its episcopal see is Shimoga. The Diocese of Shimoga is a suffragan in the ecclesiastical province of the metropolitan Archdiocese of Bangalore.

== History ==
- 14 November 1988: Established as Diocese of Shimoga from the Metropolitan Archdiocese of Bangalore and Diocese of Chikmagalur

== Bishops of Shimoga ==
- Ignatius Paul Pinto (14 November 1988 – 10 September 1998), appointed Archbishop of Bangalore
- Gerald Isaac Lobo (3 December 1999 – 16 July 2012), appointed Bishop of Udupi
  - Apostolic Administrator Henry D’Souza (16 October 2012 – 7 May 2014), Bishop of Bellary
- Francis Serrao, S.J. (19 March 2014 – 15 August 2025), appointed Bishop of Mysore
  - Apostolic Administrator Duming Dias (7 October 2025 – Present), Bishop of Karwar

== Other Priests of this Diocese who became Bishops ==
- Duming Dias (1997-2024), appointed Bishop of Karwar

== Saints and causes for canonisation ==
- Ven. Mary Jane Wilson was born in Harihar
