= Anthony Swamy Thomasappa =

Roman Catholic Bishop

Most Reverend Thomasappa Anthony Swamy
- Bishop of Chikmagalur
- Archdiocese: Bangalore
- Diocese: Chikmagalur
- Appointed: 2 December 2006
- Installed: 6 February 2007
- Predecessor: John Baptist Sequeira
- Successor: Incumbent

Orders
- Ordination: 20 May 1984
- Consecration: 6 February 2007 by Bernard Moras

Personal details
- Born: 9 February 1951 (age 75) Mariyannapalya Karnataka India
- Denomination: Roman Catholic
- Education: Pontifical Gregorian University
- Motto: TO LOVE AND SERVE

Thomasappa Anthony Swamy is the Bishop of the Roman Catholic Diocese of Chikmagalur, India.

== Early life ==
He was born in Mariyanna Palya, a small village in Bangalore on 9 February 1951.

== Priesthood ==
He was ordained a priest for the Archdiocese of Bangalore on 20 May 1984.

He was a professor in St. Peter's Pontifical Seminary, Bangalore. Thomasappa was in charge of Seminary Publications and Director of Kannada Sanga in St. Peter's Pontifical Seminary, Bangalore.

== Education ==
Bishop Anthony Swamy Thomasappa did his doctorate in Missiology in Pontifical Gregorian University in Rome.

== Episcopate ==
He was appointed Bishop of Chikmagalur on Dec. 2, 2006, and was ordained bishop on Feb. 6, 2007. The Karnataka state diocese belongs to the ecclesiastical province headed by the Archdiocese of Bangalore.

He worked in various parishes of the Archdiocese before being elected as the Bishop of Chikkamagaluru.

He was appointed the Bishop of Chikkamagaluru by Pope Benedict XVI. He was installed as bishop by Bernard Blasius Moras.
