= William Leonard D'Mello =

His Excellency, The Most Reverend William Leonard D'Mello
- Bishop of Karwar
- Archdiocese: Bangalore
- Diocese: Karwar
- Appointed: 24 January 1976
- Term ended: 24 February 2007
- Predecessor: Inaugural
- Successor: Derek Fernandes

Orders
- Ordination: 16 April 1957
- Consecration: 29 April 1977 by Duraisamy Simon Lourdusamy

Personal details
- Born: William Leonard D'Mello; 24 March 1931 Mangalore
- Died: 19 July 2011 (aged 80) Mangalore
- Buried: Cathedral of the Assumption of Our Lady, Kajubag
- Denomination: Roman Catholic
- Residence: Karwar, Karnataka
- Motto: Duc in Altum

William Leonard D'Mello (24 March 1931 – 19 July 2011) was the first Roman Catholic bishop of the Roman Catholic Diocese of Karwar, India.

Born in Mangalore and ordained to the priesthood in 1957, D'Mello was named bishop of the Karwar Diocese in 1976 and retired in 2007.

== Early life ==
D'Mello was born on 24 March 1931, at Cascia, the third of six children born to Joseph and Santana D'Mello.

== Bishop of Karwar ==
On 24 January 1976, at 44 years of age, D'Mello was appointed Bishop of the newly erected Diocese of Karwar by Pope Paul VI. His episcopal consecration took place only on 29 April 1977. Archbishop Duraisamy Simon Lourdusamy served as Consecrator, assisted by Archbishop Packiam Arokiaswamy and Bishop Ignatius P. Lobo.

One of D'Mello's key initiatives was promoting vocations to the priesthood and the religious life in his diocese. He encouraged young men to enter the seminary, and sought to bring more congregations of religious sisters into his new diocese.

== Retirement ==
D'Mello submitted his resignation upon reaching the age of 75 as required by the 1983 Code of Canon Law and in February 2007, Pope Benedict XVI accepted his resignation and appointed Derek Fernandes as his successor.

In retirement, he lived at the 'Sandhya Vandan'. D'Mello died 19 July 2011, aged 80 and was buried in the Diocese of Karwar's Cathedral of the Assumption.
