= Our Lady of the Miracles Cathedral, Kallianpur (Milagres Cathedral) =

Our Lady of the Miracles Cathedral(Milagres Cathedral)
- Igreja Nossa Senhora do Milagres; Church of Our Lady of Miracles
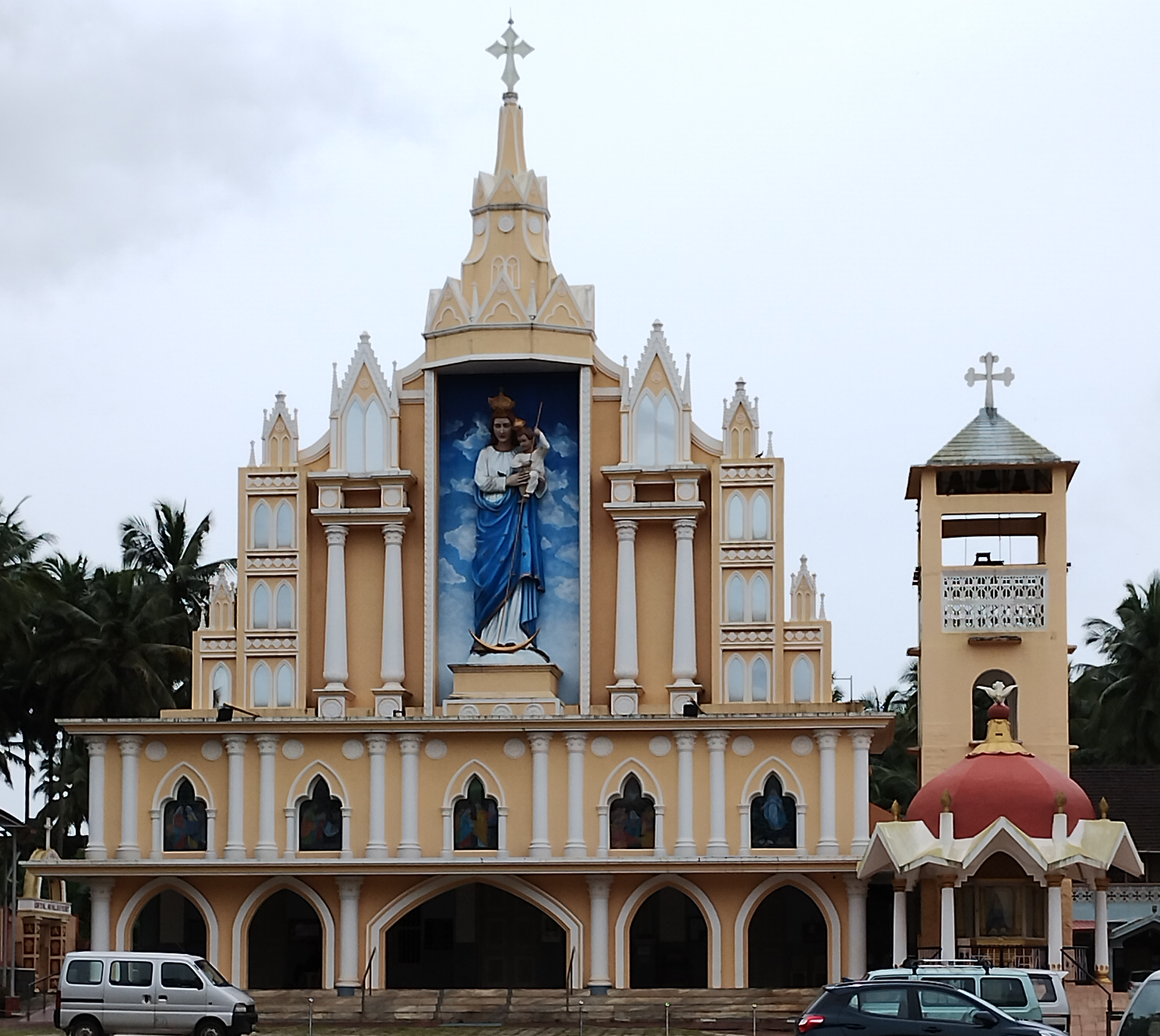
- Milagres Cathedral in 2022

- Location within Karnataka
- 13.395729°N 74.736224°E
- Location: Kallianpur, Udupi district, Karnataka
- Country: India
- Denomination: Roman Catholic (Latin rite)
- Website: www.milagrescathedralkallianpur.com

History
- Status: Cathedral
- Founded: 1678; 348 years ago

Architecture
- Functional status: active
- Designated: 2012

Administration
- Province: Roman Catholic Archdiocese of Bangalore
- Diocese: Roman Catholic Diocese of Udupi
- Deanery: Kallianpur
- Parish: Kallianpur

Clergy
- Bishop: Most Rev Dr Gerald Isaac Lobo
- Rector: Msgr. Ferdinand Gonsalves
- Vicar: Msgr. Ferdinand Gonsalves

The Cathedral of Our Lady of Miracles, Indo-Portuguese; Catedral de Nossa Senhora dos Milagres (formerly a parish church as the Church of Our Lady of Miracles, Portuguese: Igreja de Nossa Senhora dos Milagres), is a Roman Catholic Cathedral situated at Kallianpur in the Udupi district of Karnataka, India.

The Milagres Church was established in 1678 as a result of a treaty between Raja Shivappa Nayaka (the Ikkeris) of Bednore and the Portuguese in Goa and Bombay-Bassein. The structure was rebuilt in its present form in 1881 AD, after the persecution of Mangalorean Christians at Seringapatam ended. The Milagres parish was elevated to the status of a cathedral church in 2012, giving a desirable fillip to the Konkani and South Canarese Christian people of the locality.

== History ==
During the period of the Keladi Nayakas, Kallianpur developed as a Christian settlement in South Canara. In 1678, the church was constructed by the Portuguese in Goa and Bombay and dedicated to Our Lady of Miracles. The land on which the church was built was gifted to the local Christians by Somashekara Nayaka I of the Ikkeris.

The statue of Milagres Kallianpur was extracted from the writings of Charles E.G. Lewis Kallianpur, dated 1982. The statue of Our Lady of Milagres, Kallianpur is said to be miraculous. When the East India company lost the Anglo-Mysore war in 1784, Tipu Sultan gave secret orders to his commanders to seize all Christians in Canara and take them captive to Seringapatam. They carried out the secret orders and entered every church simultaneously, where Christians were expected to gather on the occasion of Good Friday. Families were herded into a forced march across the Western Ghats. Nearly all the churches in Canara were destroyed as were the churches at Barkur and Patre. The priests had either gone into hiding or had been captured and deported to Goa and Damaon. The soldiers attempted to remove the Statue of our Lady on the High Altar. However, they found that it was not possible to remove it or lift it with their hands. They used force and tools without success. But then, at that very moment, a large swarm of bees suddenly came upon them from an unknown place and attacked them. They ran for shelter, and the bees followed them. They rode down as far as the Severna river; the bees still pursued them until the soldiers dived and tried to hide in the water. This occurrence was known in the area among local people including non-Christians, who refer to Our Lady of Miracles as their Milagri Amma, Kanarese for "mother of miracles".

At that time, one of the parishioners who was in hiding, Menino Francies Luis of Nadu Kudru, Tonse, secretly carried away the Miraculous Statue from the devastated church after praying and promising that he would place her with due honor when the ordeal was over. He carried her to his home in Tons and venerated her secretly with his family and other Christians in night vigils with rosaries and reading of the Christian Purana (Kristapurana) of Fr Thomas Stevens SJ. The statue had sometimes to be hidden in other houses and especially in one Hindu house whose descendants were honored every year with a candle on the occasion of the Annual parish feast.

the Miraculous Statue was eventually brought back to the church. In memory of this event, a yearly boat procession of our Lady on a throne (cherell) at first from Nadu Kudru to the church on the eve of the parish feast from the ancient house of Mr Menino Francis Luis; but in the latter years the procession was from its neighboring Honappa Kudru from a house of his direct descendants for over a century. In the final years the procession commenced from Our Lady's Island Property of Barikudru due to the uncertainty of tides to bring it from Tonse.

The statue used for those processions is the one now used for Cherell in the church for processions on feast days. This statue was found on the Malpe shore and was delivered by fishermen to the church. It is believed to be the statue placed by Vasco da Gama on the Thonse Par Islands when he landed there and which he named the St. Mary's Islands.

In 2012, it was appointed as the Cathedral Church of the newly formed diocese, the Roman Catholic Diocese of Udupi, which was inaugurated on 15 October 2012, at the church.

In 2016, the church was renovated and the facade was rebuilt for its Platinum jubilee.

== See also ==
- Statue of Our Lady of Miracles, Jaffna patao

== Gallery ==
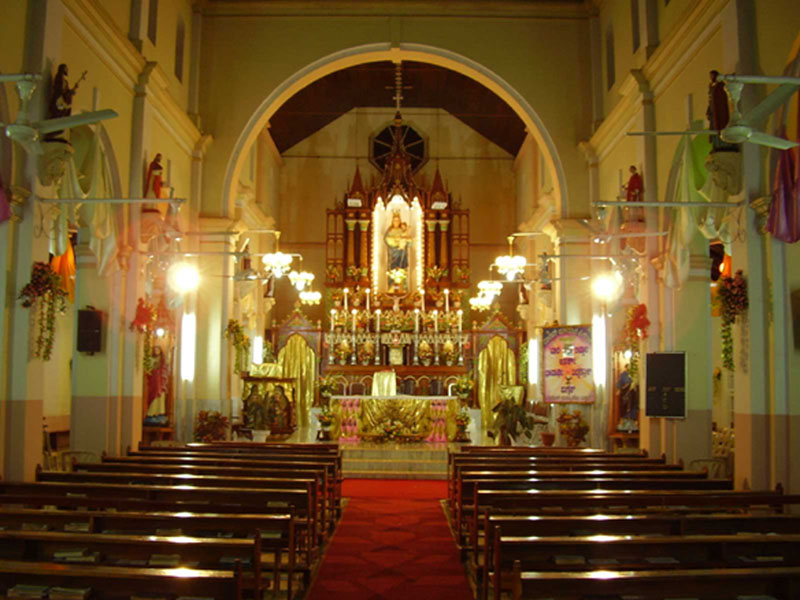
Milagres Cathedral interior

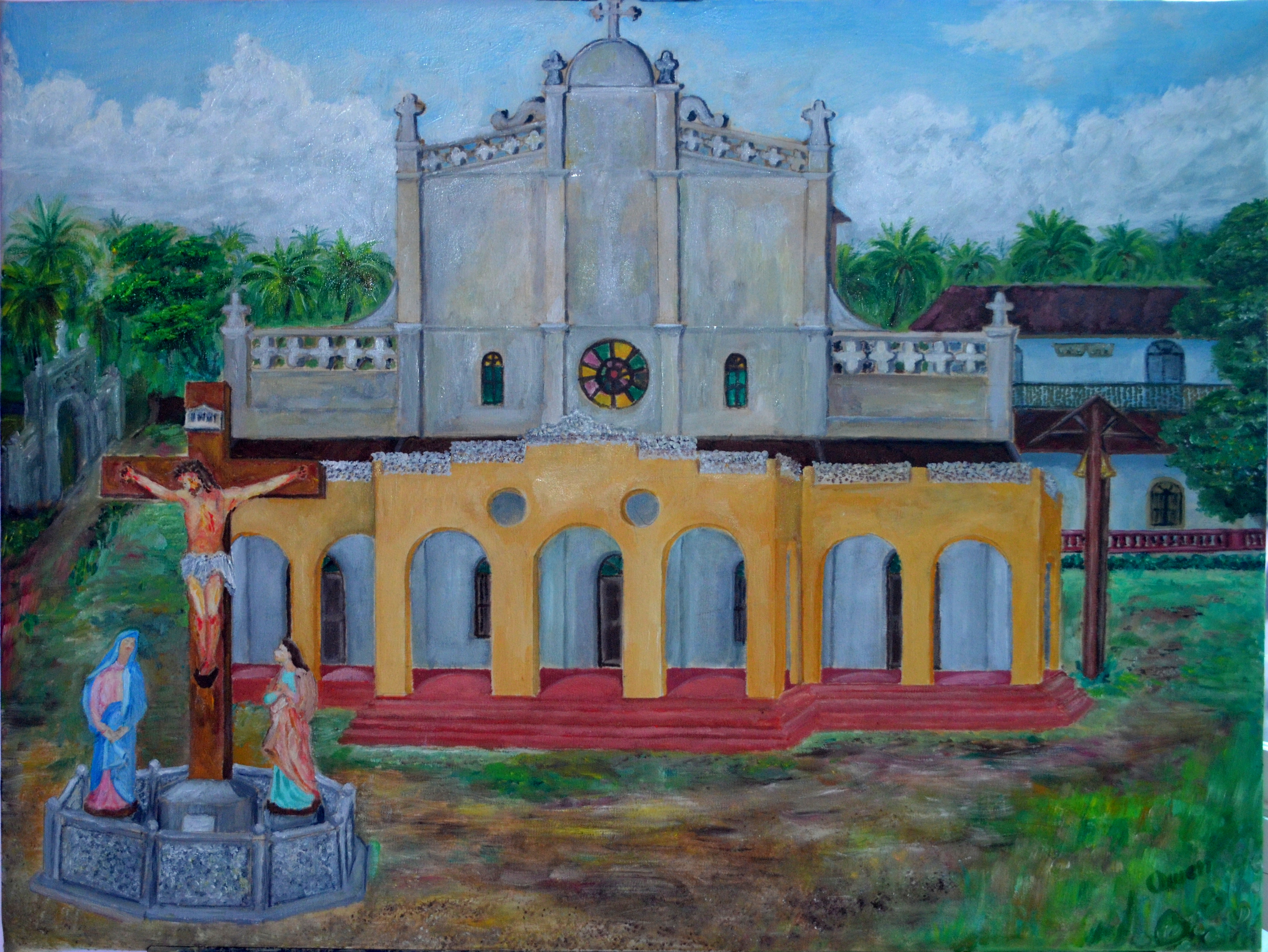
Milagres Church, (now Cathedral) Kallianpur Udupi during 1960s (Note: Painting of Milagres Church during 60s is by Owen Rodrigues a native to Kallianpur)

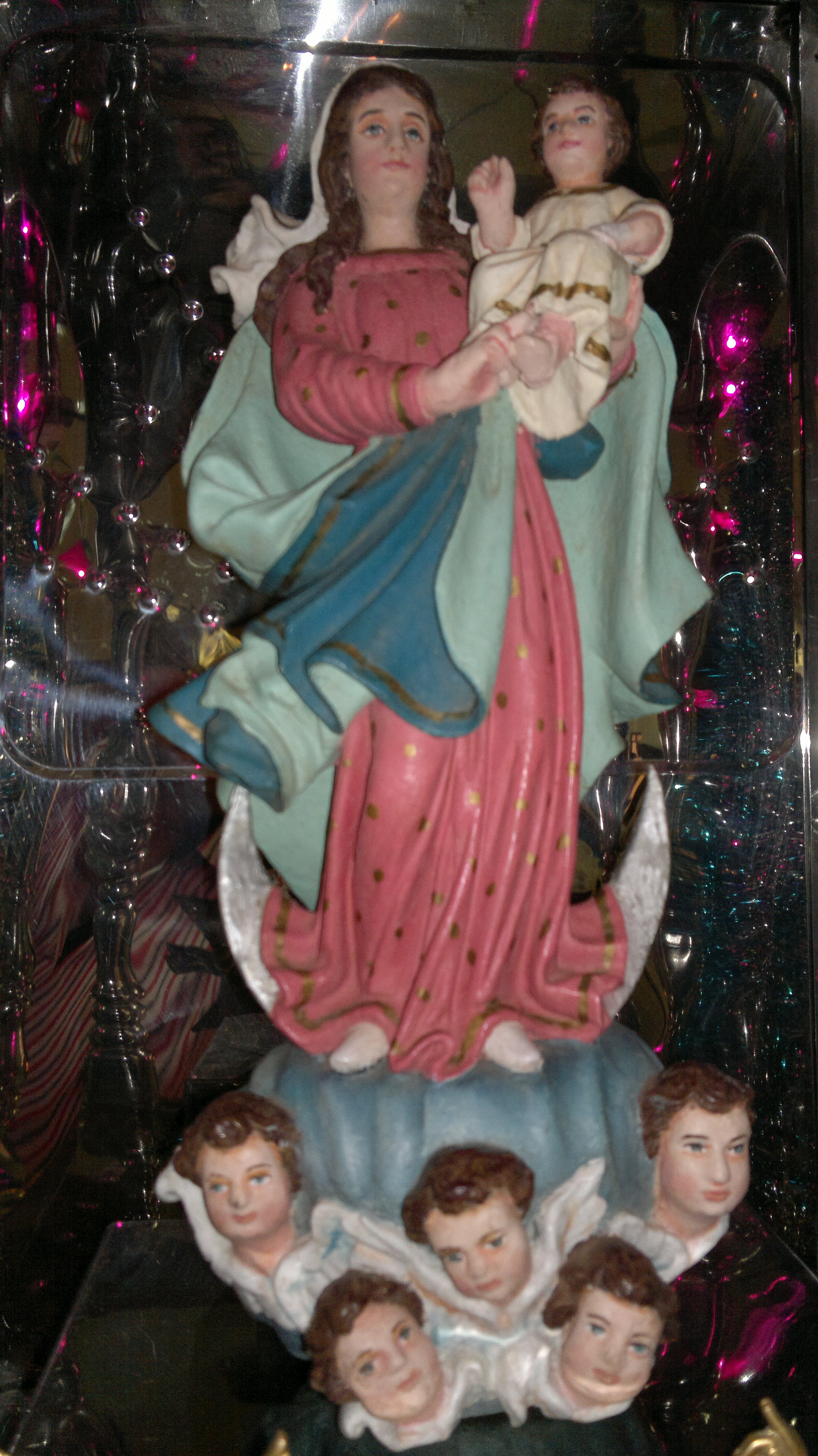
Our Lady of miracles Kallianpur

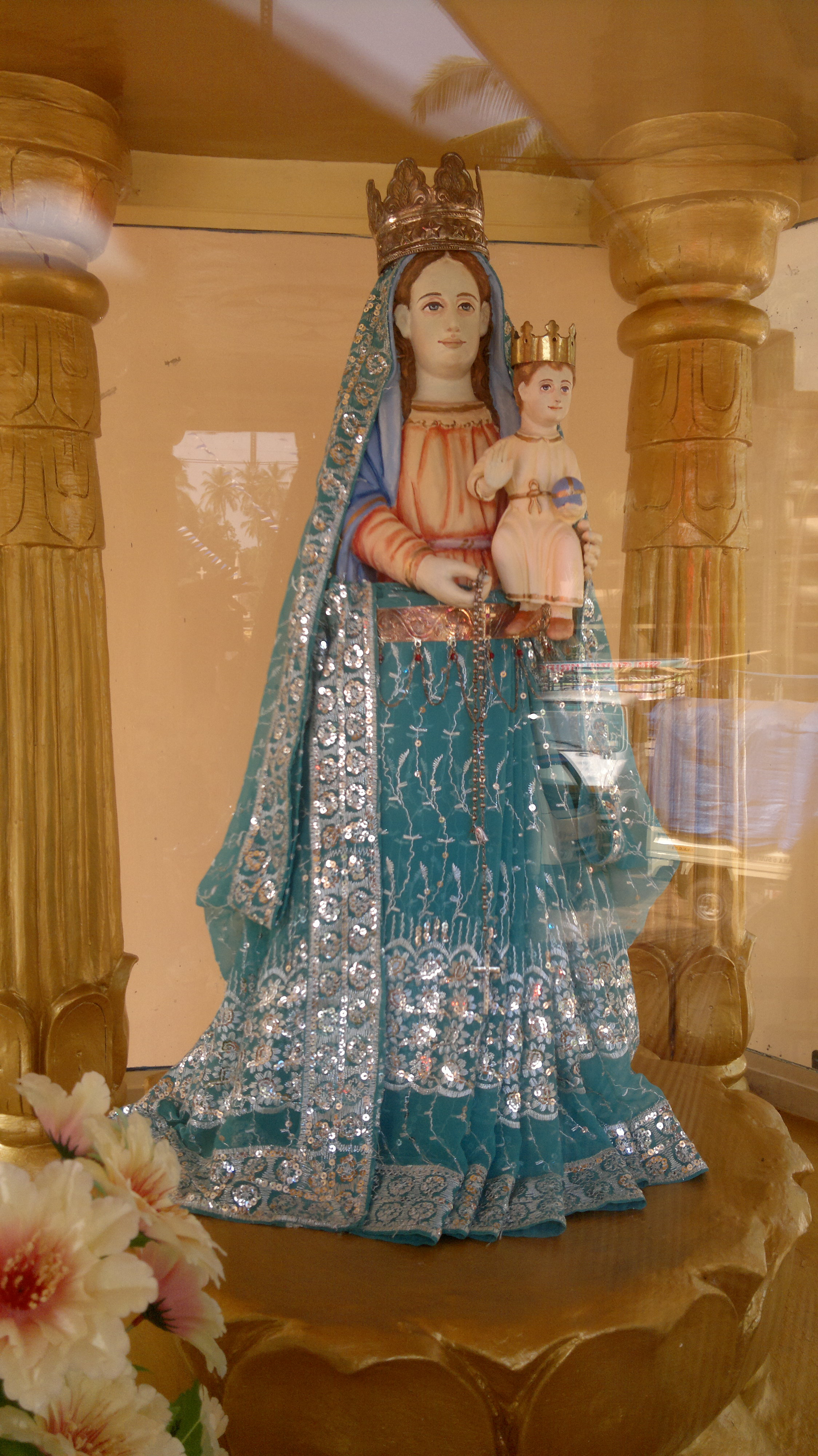
Our Lady of Milagres in the shrine

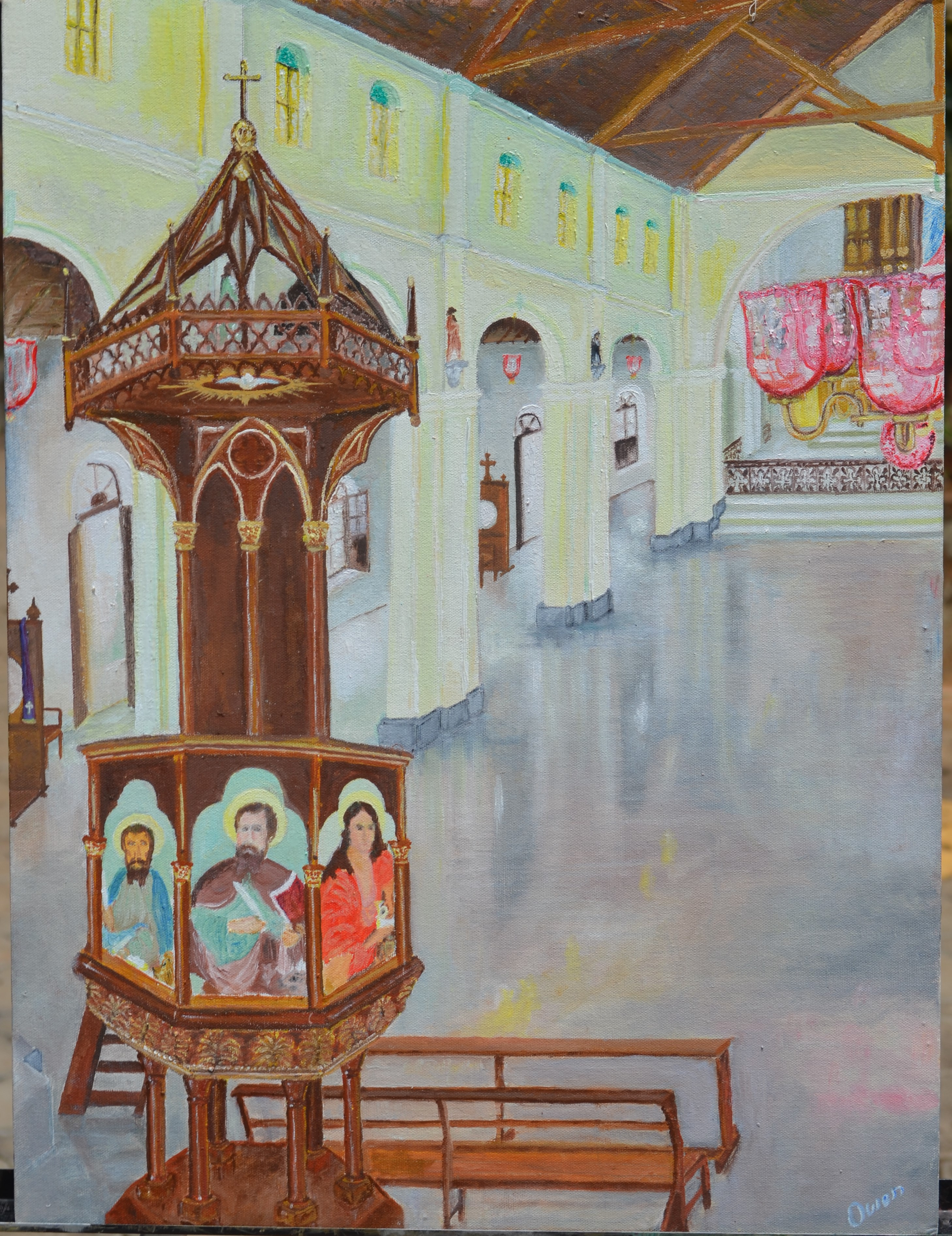
Milagres Church Pulpit during 1960s

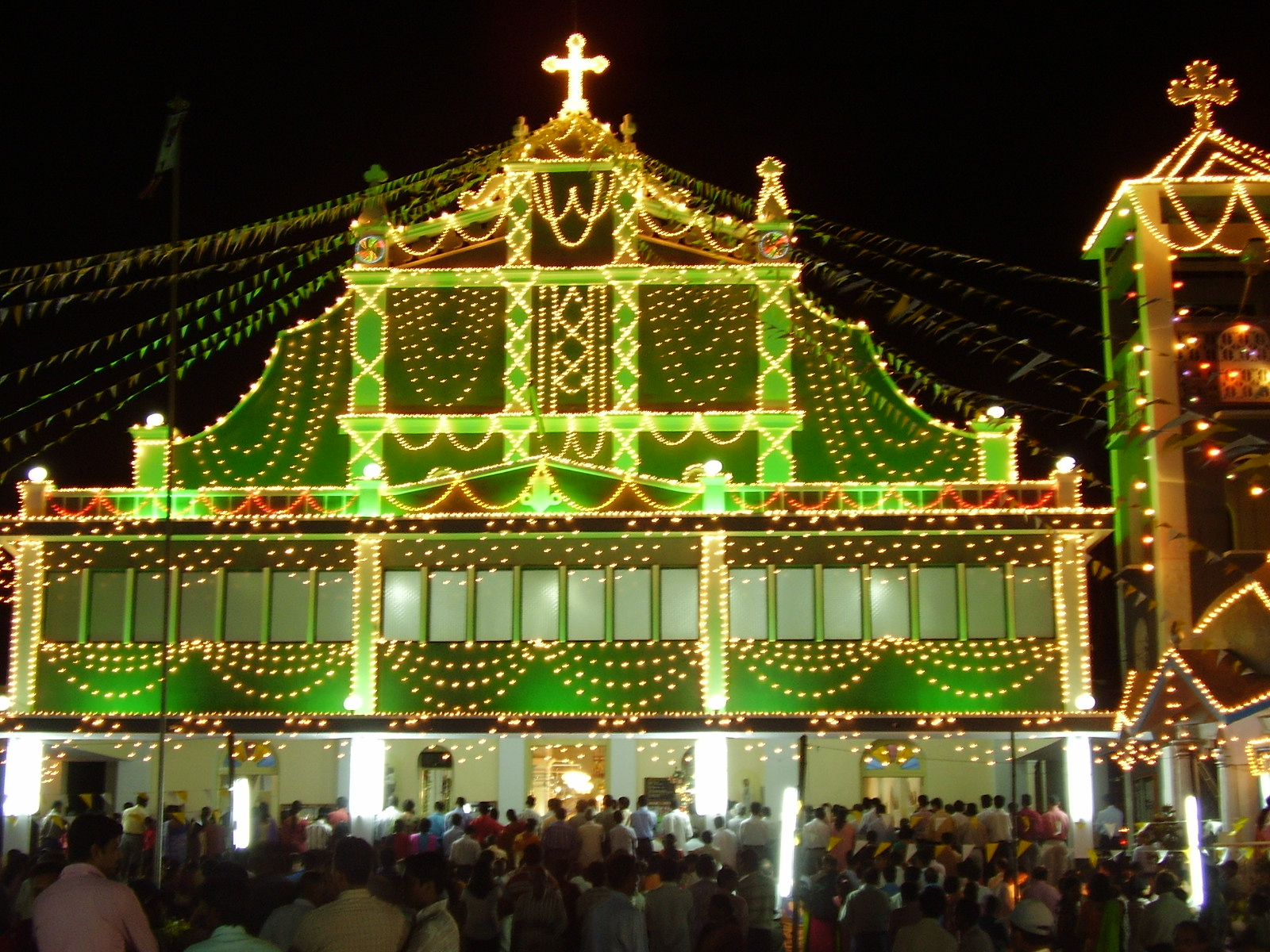
Milagres Cathedral in 2006
