= Francis Serrao =

Roman Catholic bishop

Most Reverend Francis Serrao S.J.
- Bishop of Mysore
- Archdiocese: Bangalore
- Diocese: Mysore
- Appointed: 15 August 2025
- Installed: 07 October 2025
- Predecessor: Kannikadass William Antony
- Previous post: Bishop of Shimoga (2014–2025)

Orders
- Ordination: 30 April 1992 by Basil Salvadore D'Souza
- Consecration: 7 May 2014 by Salvatore Pennacchio

Personal details
- Born: 15 August 1959 (age 67) Moodabidri, Mysore State, India
- Denomination: Roman Catholic
- Education: Jnana Deepa Vidya Peetha, Pune; Vidya Jyoti College, Delhi
- Motto: Service of Faith, Fullness of Life
- Coat of arms

Francis Serrao, S.J. is an Indian prelate of the Catholic Church who has served as the bishop of the Roman Catholic Diocese of Shimoga since 2014. In August 2025, he was named bishop of Mysore. He was installed in a ceremony in October 2025.

== Biography ==
Francis Serrao was born on 15 August 1959 in Moodabidri, Karnataka, India, one of eleven children born to Piedade Serrao and Gracy Mary Serrao. He has five brothers who are priests and a sister who is a religious.

Serrao joined the Society of Jesus on 3 January 1979. He completed his philosophy and theology studies at the Jnana-Deepa Vidyapeeth in Pune and then earned a master's degree in theology from Vidyajyoti College of Theology in New Delhi. He took his final vows as a Jesuit on 1 May 1999. He was ordained a priest for the Society of Jesus on 30 April 1992 by Bishop Basil D'Souza of Mangalore.

He worked in the Jesuits' social apostolate for the dalit and tribal people at Mundgod mission in the Diocese of Karwar in 1991/1992 and from 1994 to 1997. He was pastor of St. Joseph Church in Anekal from 2000 to 2004, and then superior of the Jesuit Mission in Bajapur for 2003/2004. He served as rector of St. Aloysius College in Mangalore, an institution with more than 11,000 students, from 2004 to 2009. He was provincial of the Karnataka Jesuit Province from 2009 to 2014.

Pope Francis appointed Serrao bishop of Shimoga on 19 March 2014. He received his episcopal consecration on 7 May 2014 from Archbishop Salvatore Pennacchio, Apostolic Nuncio to India.

On 15 August 2025, Pope Leo XIV named him bishop of Mysore. He was installed on 7 October 2025.
