= Ambrose Papaiah Yeddanapalli =

Indian clergyman and bishop

Ambrose Papaiah Yeddanapalli OFM
- Bishop of Bellary
- Church: Catholic Church
- Diocese: Diocese of Bellary
- In office: 10 December 1963 – 6 August 1992
- Predecessor: John Forest Hogan
- Successor: Joseph D’Silva

Orders
- Ordination: 3 October 1943
- Consecration: 14 April 1964 by James Knox

Personal details
- Born: 20 March 1914 Pannur, Presidency of Fort St. George, British Raj, British Empire
- Died: 20 November 1997 (aged 83)

Ambrose Papaiah Yeddanapalli (20 August 1914, in Pannur – 20 November 1997) was an Indian clergyman and bishop for the Roman Catholic Diocese of Bellary. He was ordained in 1943. He was appointed bishop in 1963. He died on 20 November 1997, at the age of 83.
