= Alphonsus Mathias =

Indian Roman Catholic archbishop (1928–2024)

- Archbishop Emeritus of Bangalore
- Archdiocese: Bangalore
- Appointed: 12 September 1986
- Term ended: 24 March 1998
- Predecessor: Packiam Arokiaswamy
- Successor: Ignatius Paul Pinto
- Previous post: Bishop of Chikmagalur (1963–1986)

Orders
- Ordination: 24 August 1954
- Consecration: 5 Feb 1964 by James Knox

Personal details
- Born: 22 June 1928 Pangala, Madras Presidency, British India
- Died: 10 July 2024 (aged 96) Bengaluru, Karnataka, India
- Denomination: Roman Catholic
- Residence: Bangalore, Karnataka, India
- Parents: Diego Mathias and Philomena D’Souza
- Motto: Sub tuum praesidium

Alphonsus Mathias (22 June 1928 – 10 July 2024) was an Indian Roman Catholic archbishop of the archdiocese of Bangalore.

== Biography ==
Mathias was ordained a priest on 24 August 1954 and was appointed the bishop of the Diocese of Chikmagalur on 16 November 1963. The Apostolic Internuncio in India James Knox consecrated him on 5 February of the next year as bishop; co-consecrators were Albert Vincent D'Souza, Archbishop of Calcutta, and Raymond D'Mello, Bishop of Allahabad.

Mathias attended the Second Vatican Council. On 12 September 1986, he was appointed Archbishop of Bangalore, a role in which he served until he resigned on 24 March 1998. He was the president of the Catholic Bishops' Conference of India from 1989 to 1994.

Mathias died on 10 July 2024, at the age of 96.

Catholic Church titles
Preceded by Packiam Arokiaswamy	Archbishop of Bangalore; 1986–1998	Succeeded by Ignatius Paul Pinto
Preceded by First	Bishop of Chikmagalur; 1963–1986	Succeeded by John Baptist Sequeira
