= Ejipura =

- Neighbourhood
- Interactive map of Ejipura
- Coordinates: 12°56′48″N 77°37′43″E
- Country: India
- State: Karnataka
- Metro: Bangalore

Area
  - Total: 1.61 km^{2} (0.62 sq mi)

Population (2015)
  - Total: 29,105
  - Density: 18,100/km^{2} (46,800/sq mi)

Languages
  - Official: Kannada
- Time zone: UTC+5:30 (IST)
- PIN: 560047

Ejipura known as E G Puram named after Equestrian Grounds Puram is a locality located in the southern part of the city of Bangalore. Ejipura is in close proximity to Viveknagar, Koramangala, Embassy GolfLinks Business Park and National Games Village.

In 2013, over 5000 people were evicted from housing in the area to clear space for a shopping mall. In October 2017, a two-story building collapsed in the area causing seven deaths and injuries to seven others.
