= Diocese of Chikmagalur =

Roman Catholic diocese in Karnataka, India

Coordinates: 13.3150°N 75.7722°E

Diocese of Chikmagalur Dioecesis Chikmagalurensis ಚಿಕ್ಕಮಗಳೂರು ಧರ್ಮಕ್ಷೇತ್ರ

Location
- Country: India
- Ecclesiastical province: Bangalore
- Metropolitan: Bangalore

Statistics
- Area: 14,015 km^{2} (5,411 sq mi)
- Population: Total; Catholics: (as of 2006); 3,014,000; 36,819 (1.2%)

Information
- Rite: Latin Rite
- Cathedral: St. Joseph’s Cathedral in Chikmagalur

Current leadership
- Pope: Leo XIV
- Bishop: Anthony Swamy Thomasappa
- Metropolitan Archbishop: Peter Machado

Map
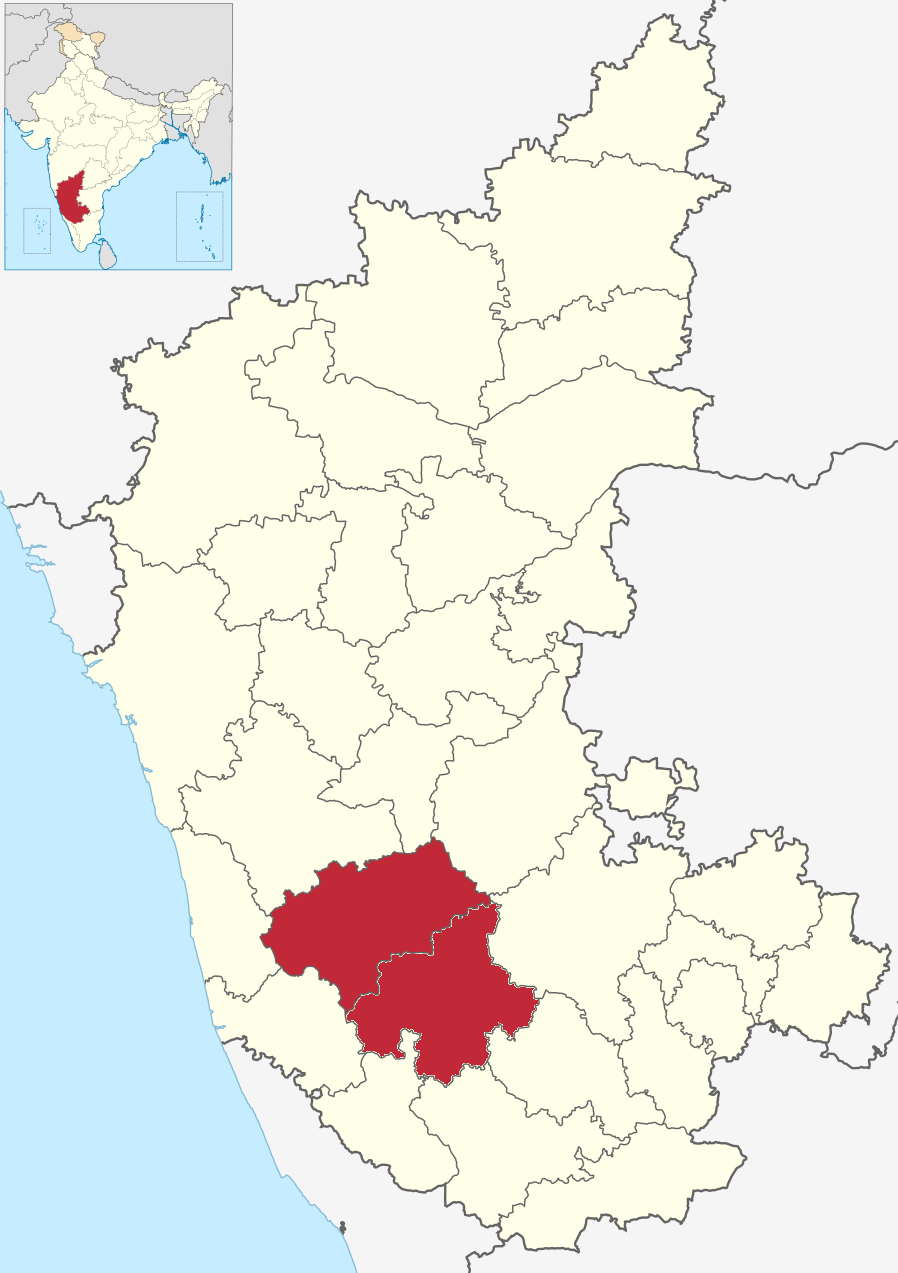

Website
- Website of the Diocese

The Roman Catholic Diocese of Chikmagalur (Latin: Chikmagaluren(sis)) is a diocese located in the city of Chikmagalur in the ecclesiastical province of Bangalore in India.

== History ==
- 16 November 1963: Established as Diocese of Chikmagalur from the Diocese of Mysore

== Leadership ==
- Bishops of Chikmagalur (Latin Rite)
  - Bishop Anthony Swamy Thomasappa (2 February 2007 – present)
  - Bishop John Baptist Sequeira (26 January 1987 – 2 December 2006)
  - Bishop Alphonsus Mathias (later Archbishop) (16 November 1963 – 12 September 1986)
