= Gerald Isaac Lobo =

Former Bishop of Udupi

Gerald Issac Lobo
- Bishop of Udupi
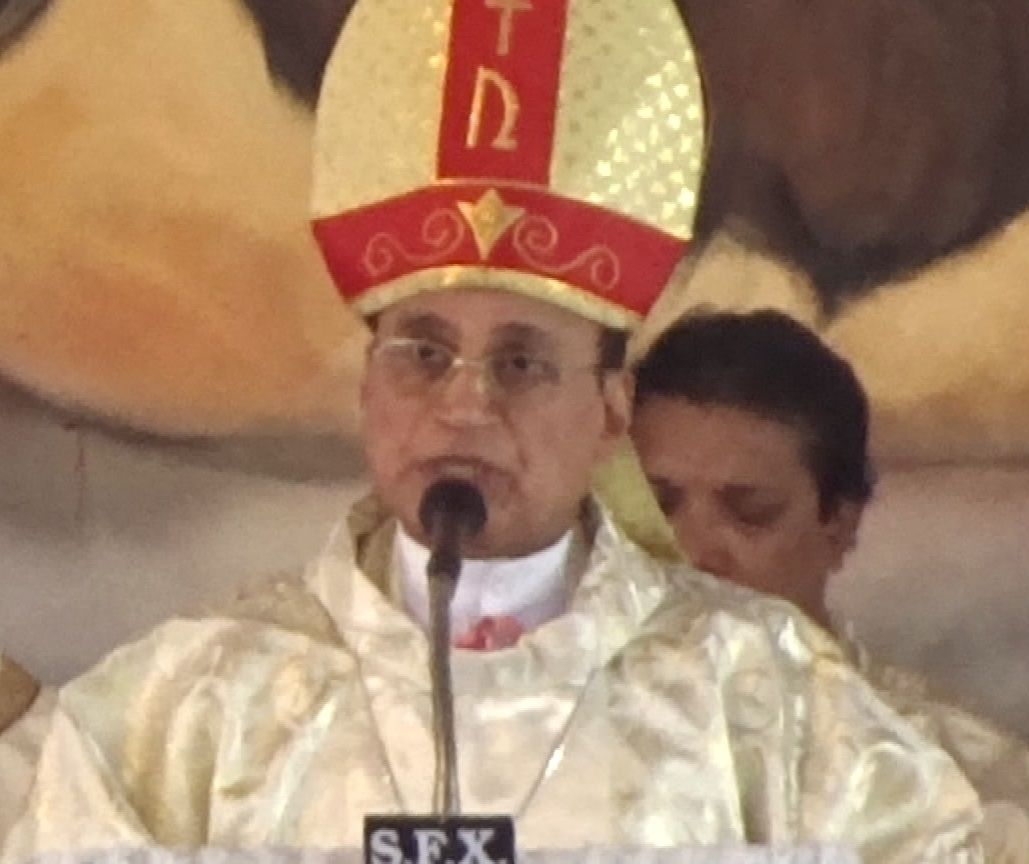
- Church: Roman Catholic church
- See: Diocese of Udupi
- In office: 2012-2026
- Retired: 31 January 2026
- Predecessor: Position established
- Successor: Leslie Clifford D'Souza
- Previous post: Bishop of Shivmogga (2000 - 2012)

Orders
- Ordination: 5 May 1977
- Consecration: 20 March 2000 (Bishop) by Archbishop Ignatius Paul Pinto (then- Archbishop of Bangalore)
- Rank: Bishop Emeritus of Udupi

Personal details
- Born: 12 November 1949; 76 years ago Agrar, Bantwal, Dakshina Kannada, Karnataka, India
- Parents: Aloyosis Lobo (Father) Mary D'Souza (Mother)
- Occupation: Parish Priest
- Motto: Service in Love (latin)

Gerald Isaac Lobo is the former Bishop of Roman Catholic Diocese of Udupi who served as the Bishop of Udupi from 2012 to 2026.

== Priestly life ==
Bishop Gerald was ordained as a priest on the 5th of May, 1977. After Ordaining as a priest he served as Assistant parish priest and as Parish priest in the various Parishes of Mangalore. Then he was appointed as the director of "CODP". After this he was assigned with responsibility as the episcopal vicar of Kasaragod in Kerala. On March 20, 2000, he was ordained as a Bishop of Shivamoga by then Arch Bishop of Bangalore Ignatius Paul Pinto. After leading the Diocese of Shivamoga for 13 years he was appointed as the first Bishop of Udupi.
