= Diocese of Karwar =

Roman Catholic diocese in Karnataka, India

Diocese of Karwar Dioecesis Karwarians ಕಾರವಾರ ಧರ್ಮಪ್ರಾಂತ

catholic

Location
- Country: India
- Ecclesiastical province: Bangalore
- Metropolitan: Bangalore
- Headquarters: Karwar
- Coordinates: 14°49′04″N 74°10′44″E

Statistics
- Area: 10,277 km^{2} (3,968 sq mi)
- Population: Total; Catholics: (as of 2019); 1,536,130; 45,515 (3.0%)
- Parishes: 68
- Churches: 38 missions

Information
- Rite: Latin Rite
- Established: January 24, 1976
- Cathedral: Cathedral of the Assumption of Our Lady, Karwar
- Patron saint: Saint Joseph
- Secular priests: 137

Current leadership
- Pope: Leo XIV
- Bishop: Duming Dias
- Metropolitan Archbishop: Peter Machado

The Roman Catholic Diocese of Karwar (Latin: Karvaren(sis)) is a diocese located in the city of Karwar in the ecclesiastical province of Bangalore in India.

== Bishops ==
- Bishop-elect Duming Dias (Since 16 January 2024)
- Bishop [see vacant] (Since May 2019 - 13 January 2024)
- Bishop Rt. Rev. DR. Derek Fernandes (2007-2019)
- Bishop William Leonard D'Mello (24 January 1976 – 24 February 2007)
