= Viveknagar =

- Neighborhood
- Location in Karnataka, India
- Coordinates: 12.9545°N 77.6191°E
- Country: India
- District: Bangalore Urban
- Metro: Purple at Trinity Metro Station, Pink at National Military School

Languages
  - Official: Kannada
- Time zone: UTC+5:30 (IST)
- PIN: 560047
- Vehicle registration: KA-01
- Municipality: Bengaluru Central City Corporation
- Lok Sabha Constituency: Bangalore Central
- Vidhan Sabha Constituency: Shantinagar

Vivek Nagar, Viveknagar or Viveka Nagar is a neighborhood under Bengaluru Central City Corporation in Bangalore, Karnataka. It is situated in between M G Road and Koramangala. Viveknagar is part of Bangalore Central Lok Sabha constituency and Shanti Nagar Assembly constituency. The closest metro station is the Trinity metro station.

== Neighborhood ==
Viveknagar layout is surrounded by Army Service Corps Headquarters and Pioneer Corps Training Centre. The golf course of ASC Center borders Viveknagar Further Extension. The famous Infant Jesus Church is located near this neighborhood. The 1997 National Games Village at Ejipura also borders the southern part of Viveknagar. The Lower Agaram Road at Viveknagar stretches from Hosmat Hospital to National Games Village.

Cubbon Park is 5.7 km from Viveknagar Bus Stop and Lal Bagh is 6.2 km away, and Vidhana Soudha is 6.5 km away.

=== Surrounding Neighborhoods ===
Neighborhoods surrounding Viveka Nagar are:

- M.G. Road
- Ashok Nagar
- Austin Town
- Victoria Layout
- Vannarpet
- Koramangala
- Ejipura
- Neelasandra

== Connectivity ==
Viveknagar Bus stand is located at 4th Main Road. The Kempegowda Bus Station at Majestic is also 7 km from Viveknagar Bus stand. The nearest metro station is the Trinity metro station. The Bangalore Cantonment railway station is approx. 7.1 km from Viveknagar Bus stand, the Bangalore City railway station is approx. 7.5 km from Viveknagar Bus stand and the Bangalore East railway station is approx. 7.2 km away from the Bus stand.

Viveknagar Connectivity
Mode	Operator	Station Name	Distance in km
Bus	BMTC	Viveknagar Bus Stand	0.0
Bus	KSRTC	Shanti Nagar Bus Terminus	5.5
Bus	KSRTC	Kempegowda Bus Station	7.0
Metro	BMRCL	Trinity Purple	2.5
Metro	BMRCL	National Military School Pink	2.0
Railways	SWR	Cantonment	7.1
Railways	SWR	City	7.5
Railways	SWR	East	7.2
Railways	SWR	SMVT	7.5
Airways	BIAL	Kempegowda International Airport	37.5
Airways (Charter)	HAL	Bangalore Airport	8.6
Airways (Charter)	GoK	Jakkur Aerodrome	18.0
