= John Baptist Sequeira =

Indian Roman Catholic bishop (1930–2019)

- Bishop of Chikmagalur
- Church: Catholic Church
- Diocese: Diocese of Chikmagalur
- In office: 26 January 1987 – 2 December 2006
- Predecessor: Alphonsus Mathias
- Successor: Anthony Swamy Thomasappa

Orders
- Ordination: 15 April 1958
- Consecration: 11 June 1987 by Alphonsus Mathias

Personal details
- Born: 23 June 1930 Mangalore, Presidency of Fort St. George, British Raj, British Empire
- Died: 9 October 2019 (aged 89) Bengaluru, Karnataka, India

John Baptist Sequeira (23 June 1930 – 9 October 2019) was an Indian Roman Catholic bishop.

Sequeira was born in India and was ordained to the priesthood in 1958. He served as bishop of the Roman Catholic Diocese of Chikmagalur, India, from 1987 to 2006. In 1998 he won the Sahitya Akademi Award for his Konkani-language poetry "Ashim Asim Lharan".
