= Diocese of Udupi =

Catholic diocese in Karnataka, India

Diocese of Udupi Dioecesis Udupiensis
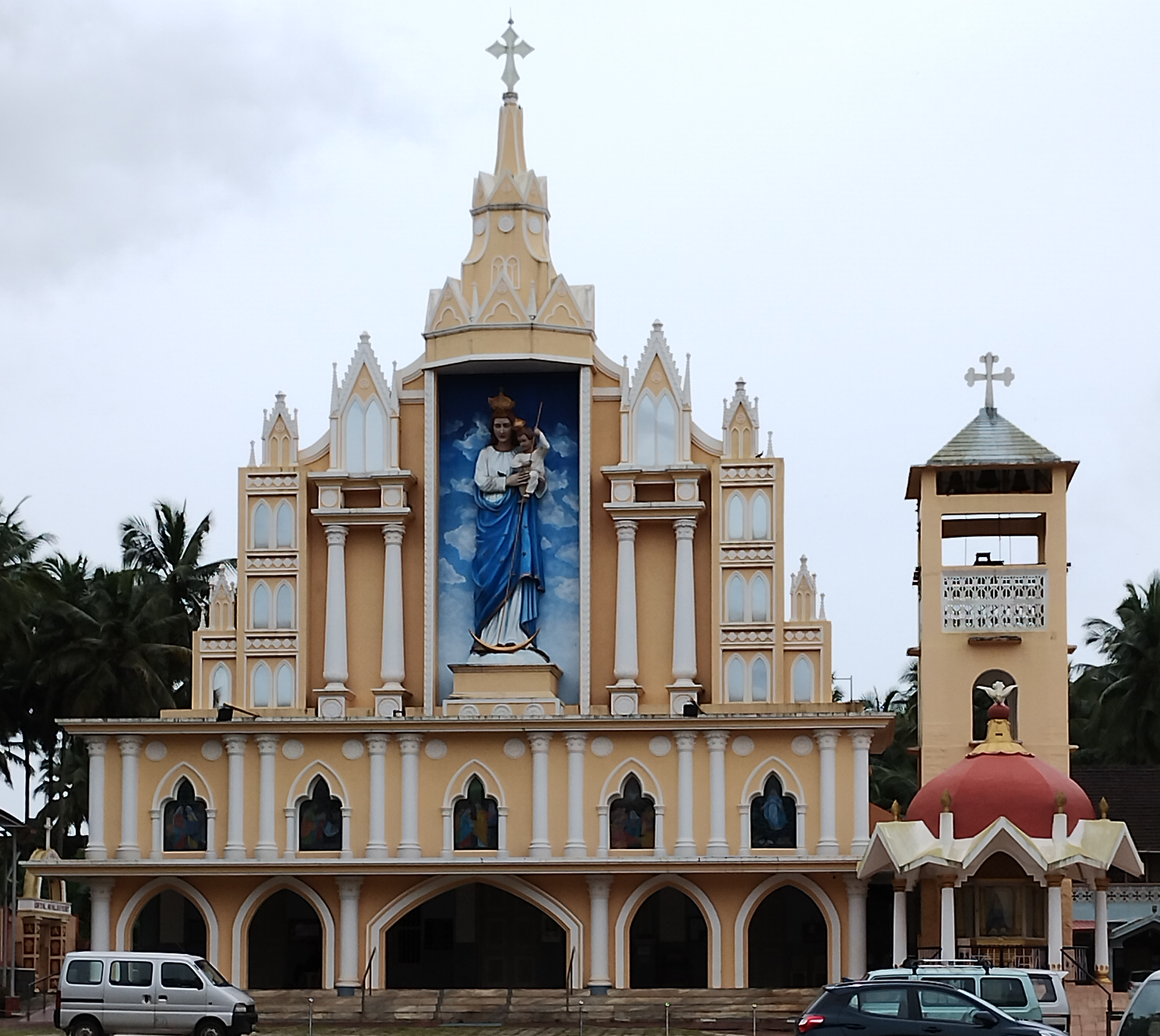
- Our Lady of the Miracles Cathedral (Milagres Cathedral)

Location
- Country: India
- Territory: Karnataka
- Ecclesiastical province: Archdiocese of Bangalore
- Metropolitan: Archdiocese of Bangalore
- Deaneries: 5
- Coordinates: 13.3957286°N 74.7362242°E

Statistics
- Area: 3,501 km^{2} (1,352 sq mi)
- Population: Total; Catholics: (as of 2012); 1,445,240; 106,149 (7.3%)
- Parishes: 52

Information
- Denomination: Catholic Church
- Sui iuris church: Latin Church
- Rite: Roman Rite
- Established: October 2012
- Cathedral: Cathedral of Our Lady of the Miracles in Udupi
- Patron saint: Our Lady of Miracles

Current leadership
- Pope: Leo XIV
- Bishop: Leslie Clifford Dsouza
- Metropolitan Archbishop: Peter Machado
- Vicar General: Francis Xavier Lewis

Website
- Website of the Diocese

Udupi District in Karnataka

The Diocese of Udupi (Latin: Dioecesis Udupiensis) is a diocese located in the Kallianpur town of Udupi District of Karnataka, India. It was announced by Pope Benedict XVI on 16 July 2012. It comprises the six civil talukas Udupi, Bramavara, Karkala, Kapu, Kundapura and Byndoor and is a suffragan of the Archdiocese of Bangalore. The diocese now contains 47 parishes, the newly elevated Cathedral which was previously a parish church as "Church of Our Lady of Miracles" or the Milagres Church, the parish was partitioned from the Mangalore Diocese, while the parish church was elevated to the Cathedral of Our Lady of Miracles.

== Overview ==
The Udupi district had been a part of the Diocese of Mangalore since 1887. The diocese was inaugurated on 15 October 2012 by Apostolic Nuncio of India, Salvatore Pennacchio at Milagres Cathedral, Kallianpur. Bishop Gerald Isaac Lobo was appointed the first bishop of the diocese.

The Catholics of this district are Mangalorean Catholics. The Udupi diocese is the 9th in the province, 14th diocese in the state and 166th diocese in the country and is a suffragan of the Archdiocese of Bangalore. The Diocese of Mangalore (Latin: Diocesis Mangalorensis) is a diocese located in the city of Mangalore in the Ecclesiastical province of Bangalore in India. The diocese falls on the southwestern coast of India. At present, it comprises the whole civil districts of Dakshina Kannada and Udupi in Karnataka state. This region was collectively referred to as South Canara during the British Raj and the early post-independence era, prior to the States Reorganisation Act in 1956. It was established as a separate Apostolic Vicariate from the Apostolic Vicariate of Verapoly in 1853 and was promoted to a diocese on 1 September 1886.

On Monday, July 16, 2012, it lost territory when Pope Benedict XVI erected the new Diocese of Udupi (made up of the three civil townships of Udupi, Karkala and Kundapura), which will also become part of the province of Bangalore.

On 28 June 2021, Charles Menezes assumed charge as the Secretary of the Youth Commission and the Director of the Indian Catholic Youth Movement for the Diocese of Udupi.

== Bishops of the Diocese of Udupi ==
- Bishop Gerald Isaac Lobo (15 October 2012 – 20 April 2026)
- Bishop Leslie Clifford D'Souza (20 April 2026– Present)

== Saints and causes for canonisation ==
- Servant of God Peter John Roche (Alfred of Moodahadu)

== See also ==
- Christianity in Karnataka
- Diocese of Belthangady
- Diocese of Mangalore
- Deanery of Belthangady
- Syro-Malankara Catholic Eparchy of Puttur
- Most Holy Redeemer Church, Belthangady
