= Derek Fernandes =

His Excellency, The Most Reverend Derek Fernandes
- Bishop of Belgaum
- Archdiocese: Bangalore
- Diocese: Belgaum
- Appointed: 01 May 2019
- Predecessor: Peter Machado
- Successor: Incumbent

Orders
- Ordination: 5 May 1979
- Consecration: 20 April 2007

Personal details
- Born: Derek Fernandes; May 14, 1954 (age 72)
- Denomination: Roman Catholic
- Residence: Belgaum, Karnataka
- Motto: MITTITE IN DEXTERAM NAVIGII RETE

Derek Fernandes is the 6th current serving Roman Catholic Diocese of Belgaum. and was the Apostolic Administrator of Karwar.

His additional responsibility as Apostolic Administrator of Karwar was completed after Duming Dias was appointed as Bishop of Karwar by Pope Francis.

== Life ==
He was born in Sirsi on 14 May 1954

== Priesthood ==
He was ordained a priest on 5 May 1979.

== Episcopate ==
On 24 February 2007, Pope Benedict XVI named Fernandes Bishop of Karwar, and he was consecrated as a bishop on 20 April 2007.

On 01 May 2019, Pope Francis appointed him as the 6th Bishop of Belgaum.
