= Henry D'Souza =

Indian singer (1943–2026)

- Born: 1943; Basrikatte, Koppa taluk, Chikkamagaluru district
- Died: 14 August 2026 (aged 82–83) Mumbai, India

Henry D'Souza (1943 – 14 August 2026) was an Indian singer, musician and composer of Konkani songs. His most notable work was the song "Ye Ye Katrina".

== Early life ==
D'Souza was born in 1943 in Basrikatte in Koppa taluk, Chikkamagaluru district. D'Souza initially studied in Mangaluru and Puttur. He then moved to Bombay to pursue an LL.B. degree from the University of Bombay.

== Career ==
D'Souza was inspired by Western music. He performed across in India and other countries, including the United States, Canada, Sri Lanka and the Gulf countries. This exposed people across the world to Mangalorean Konkani music.

In 1973, he recorded "Ye Ye Katrina" with Helen D'Cruz on HMV India. The song's lyrics tour Bandra, Mahim and Byculla. The song had versions in Hindi and Sinhalese. As of 2026, the song is still played at weddings. His other famous song was "Ami Doge Sezari".

He recorded over 700 songs for All India Radio and composed more than 2000 songs.

== Awards and accolades ==
He was awarded the titles of "Sangeet Samrat" in 1988 and "Kala Ratna" in 1995. He was also awarded the Daiji Dubai Lifetime Achievement Award.

== Death ==
D'Souza died on 14 August 2026 at his residence in Mumbai at the age of 83. His funeral was on 16 August at St. Thomas Church in Goregaon East, Mumbai.
