= Kuppepadavu =

- Town
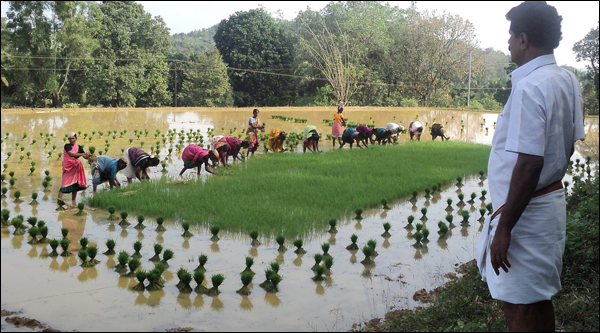
- Paddy Cultivation in Kuppepadavu

- Location in Karnataka, India
- Coordinates: 12.97°N 74.99°E
- Country: India
- State: Karnataka
- Region: Tulu Nadu
- District: Dakshina Kannada

Languages
  - Official: Kannada
- Time zone: UTC+5:30 (IST)
- PIN: 574144
- Telephone code: 0824
- Vehicle registration: KA-19
- Website: www.kuppepadavu.com

Kuppepdavu, is a small town in Karnataka, India, 27 km away from Mangalore city and 340 km away from its State Capital City Bangalore. Bantwal is 15 km away, Moodbidri is 16 km away and Bajpe is 12 km away.
