= Ignatius Paul Pinto =

Indian priest (1925–2023)

His Excellency Ignatius Paul Pinto
- Archbishop Emeritus of Bangalore
- Appointed: 10 September 1998
- Term ended: 22 July 2004
- Predecessor: Alphonsus Mathias
- Successor: Bernard Blasius Moras
- Previous post: Bishop of Shimoga (1988–1998)

Orders
- Ordination: 24 August 1952
- Consecration: 31 January 1989 by Alphonsus Mathias

Personal details
- Born: 18 May 1925 Bantval, British India
- Died: 8 February 2023 (aged 97) Bangalore, Karnataka, India
- Motto: Ora et labora

Ignatius Paul Pinto (18 May 1925 – 8 February 2023) was an Indian Roman Catholic prelate. He was bishop of Shimoga from 1988 to 1998 and archbishop of Bangalore from 1998 to 2004.

Catholic Church titles
Preceded by Alphonsus Mathias	Archbishop of Bangalore; 1998–2004	Succeeded by Bernard Blasius Moras
Preceded by Post created	Bishop of Shimoga; 1988–1998	Succeeded by Gerald Isaac Lobo
