= Roman Catholic Diocese of Mysore =

Roman Catholic diocese in Karnataka, India

Coordinates: 12.3208°N 76.6582°E

Diocese of Mysore Diœcesis Mysuriensis ಮೈಸೂರು ಧರ್ಮಕ್ಷೇತ್ರ

Location
- Country: India
- Ecclesiastical province: Bangalore
- Metropolitan: Roman Catholic Archdiocese of Bangalore
- Headquarters: Mysore

Statistics
- Area: 21,051 km^{2} (8,128 sq mi)
- Population: Total; Catholics: (as of 2022); 16,285,570; 117,790 (0.7%)
- Parishes: 80

Information
- Denomination: Roman Catholic
- Rite: Latin Rite
- Cathedral: Cathedral of St Philomena in Mysore
- Patron saint: Saint Joseph
- Language: Kannada, English, Tamil, Telugu, Konkani

Current leadership
- Pope: Leo XIV
- Bishop: Francis Serrao
- Metropolitan Archbishop: Peter Machado
- Bishops emeritus: Thomas Antony Vazhapilly; Kannikadass William Antony

Map
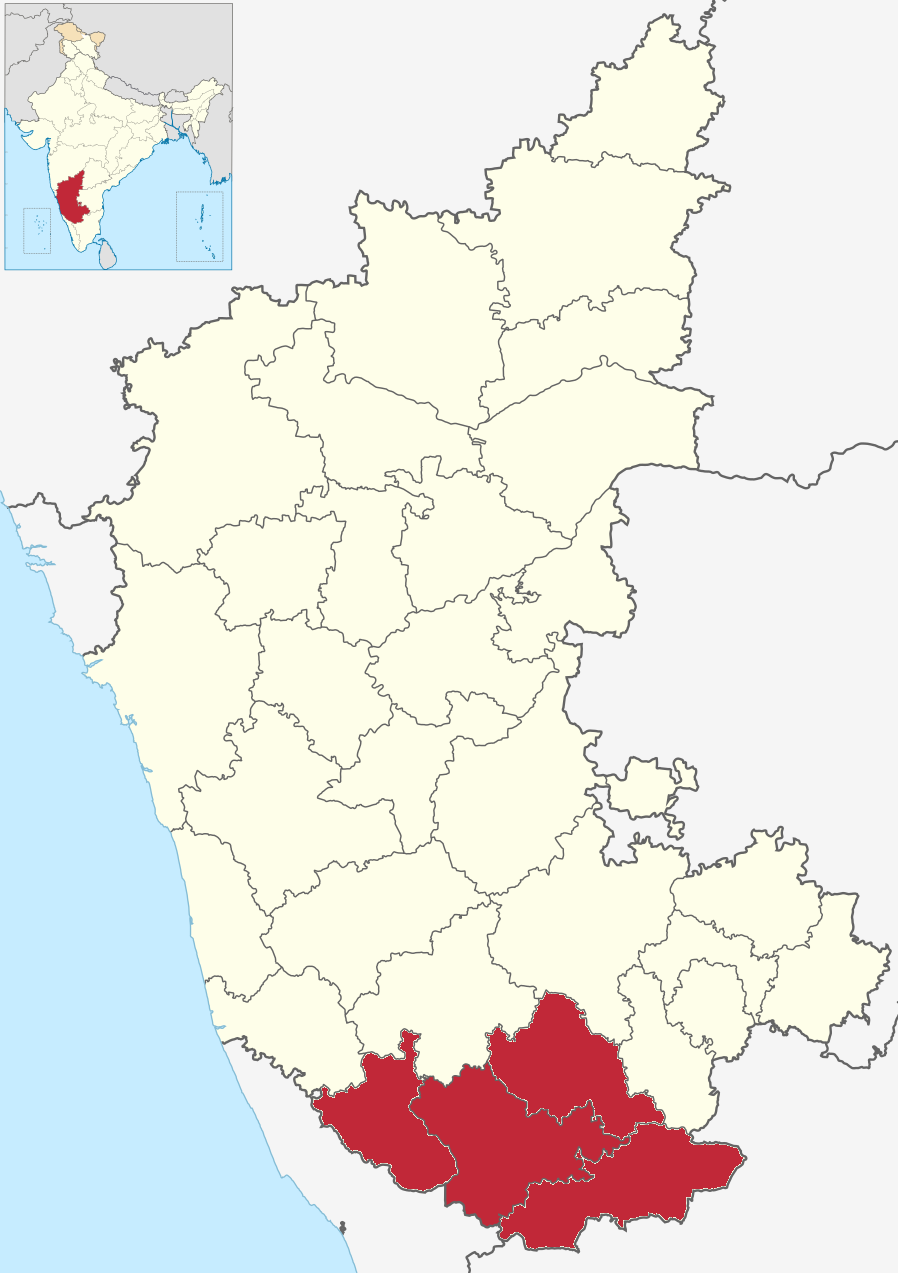

The Roman Catholic Diocese of Mysore (Latin: Mysurien(sis)) is a suffragan Latin diocese, in the ecclesiastical province of Bangalore in southern India. Its cathedral episcopal see is St. Philomena's Cathedral in the city of Mysore in Karnataka.

== Statistics ==
As per 2022, it pastorally served 117,790 Catholics (0.7% of 16,285,570 total) on 21,051 km^{2} in 80 parishes with 216 priests (118 diocesan, 98 religious), 1,224 lay religious (263 brothers, 872 sisters) and 22 seminarians.

== History ==
- Established on 16 March 1845 as a Pro-Vicariate of Mysore - Bangalore, on territory split off (depending on the source) either from the Apostolic Vicariate of Pondicherry or from the then Apostolic Vicariate of Madura and Coromandel Coast (now Diocese of Tiruchirapalli)
- Promoted on 3 April 1850 as the Apostolic Vicariate of Mysore - Bangalore
- Promoted on 1 September 1886 as Diocese of Mysore - Bangalore in the Ecclesiastical Metropolitan Province of Pondicherry
- Lost territories repeatedly : on 12 June 1923 to establish Diocese of Calicut, on 26 May 1930 to establish Diocese of Salem, on 13 February 1940 to establish Diocese of Bangalore, on 3 July 1955 to establish Diocese of Ootacamund and on 16 November 1963 to establish Diocese of Chikmagalur.

== Leadership ==
Until 1963, all European members of Latin rite missionary congregations

Apostolic Vicars of Mysore

- Étienne-Louis Charbonnaux, Paris Foreign Missions Society (M.E.P.) (born France) (3 April 1850 – death 23 June 1873), Titular Bishop of Iassus (8 July 1844 – 23 June 1873), previously as Coadjutor Apostolic Vicar of Verapoly (India) (8 July 1844 – 3 April 1850)
- Joseph-Auguste Chevalier, M.E.P. (born France) (11 November 1873 – death 25 March 1880), Titular Bishop of Germanicopolis (11 November 1873 – 25 March 1880)
- Jean-Yves-Marie Coadou, M.E.P. (born France) (20 August 1880 – 25 November 1886 see below), Titular Bishop of Chrysopolis in Arabia (20 August 1880 – 1 September 1886)

Suffragan Bishops of Mysore

- Jean-Yves-Marie Coadou, M.E.P. (see above 25 November 1886 – death 14 September 1890)
- Eugène-Louis Kleiner, M.E.P. (born France) (14 September 1890 – retired 2 June 1910), succeeding as former Titular Bishop of Lyrba (20 June 1890 – 14 September 1890) as Coadjutor Bishop of Mysore (20 June 1890 – 14 September 1890); on emeritate Titular Bishop of Tlous (17 June 1910 – death 19 August 1915)
- Augustin-François Baslé, M.E.P. (born France) (2 June 1910 – death 13 September 1915), succeeding as former Titular Bishop of Calynda (15 December 1905 – 2 June 1910) as Coadjutor Bishop of Mysore (15 December 1905 – 2 June 1910)
- Hippolyte Teissier, M.E.P. (born France) (4 September 1916 – death 26 February 1922)
- Maurice-Bernard-Benoit-Joseph Despatures, M.E.P. (born France) (21 June 1922 – 13 February 1940); next Bishop of Bangalore (India) (13 February 1940 – 6 September 1942), emeritate as Titular Bishop of Benda (6 September 1942 – death 26 August 1963)
- René-Jean-Baptiste-Germain Feuga, M.E.P. (born France) (3 April 1941 – retired 20 November 1962), stayed on as Apostolic Administrator 20 November 1962 – 16 November 1963) while on emeritates as Titular Bishop of Fornos major (20 November 1962 – death 27 January 1964)
- Sebastião Francisco Mathias Fernandes (first native incumbent) (16 November 1963 – death 9 May 1985)
- Francis Michaelappa (from 22 December 1986 until his death on 17 March 1993)
- Joseph Roy (19 December 1994 – retired 12 February 2003); died 2014
- Thomas Antony Vazhapilly (12 February 2003 – retired 25 January 2017)
- Kannikadass William Antony (25 January 2017; suspended on 7 January 2023, resigned 13 January 2024)
- Francis Serrao (15 August 2025 –)
