= Pannur =

Village in Tamil Nadu, India

Coordinates: 13°26′N 80°01′E

Pannur is a village in Thiruvallur district, Tamil Nadu. It is a part of Thiruppandiyur Panchayat.

== Demographics ==
A majority of the population is Kamma Naidus/Chowdhury with Telugu-speakers.

Pannur is a 300-year-old village with Telugu-speaking community from Guntur district (Andhra Pradesh).

== History ==
The migrant arrived around 1700 AD and settled initially in Kilacheri (around 8 km from the village). Later a group moved to Pannur.

== Culture ==
The Church of Our Lady Of Good Health is 150 years old. It is located at the centre of the village. Pannur celebrates the festival of Our Lady Of Health on 31 May every year.

Many landlords such as Tharigopala Jaianna Naidu donated their lands to the church.

== Education ==
Elementary schools for boys and girls are named after St. Annes, and managed by the Sisters of St. Annes.

The Salesians of Don Bosco manage a school which was established as an apostolic school and for the welfare of the poor children from nearby localities like Anthoniyaar Puram, Susaipuram, Pannur and other local villages. It imparts Tamil- and English-medium education for children up to class 12.

Don Bosco higher secondary education school was established in Pannur in 1958, with the help of then village President Shri. Bashyam Jacob Naidu, a great Salesian priest Rev. Fr. Ittyatchan S.D., and the village parish priest Rev. Fr. D. Joseph D.D. The first SSLC batch graduated in 1962.

== Economy ==
In 1953 Pannur began trading groundnut, paddy, and ragi. The first rice mill in Pannur was the Bashyam rice mill. The first modern rice mill was established by Shr. Malapati Sebastian Naidu called MSN rice mill. These rice mills helped the villagers who had agriculture as their prime source of income.

Pannur is located on the state highway connecting Thiruvallur and Kanchipuram.

Agriculture was the main source of income until the 1960s. Thereafter, many youngsters with better educational facilities began working as teachers or joined government services. From the 1990s, many youngsters acquired professional degrees, engineering degrees, medicine and joined leading software and corporate companies and hospitals. They migrated to cities such as Chennai, Hyderabad, Bangalore, Mumbai, Baroda, Delhi, etc., and many migrated to the US, UK, Australia, Ireland, Dubai, Middle East, Switzerland, France, Netherlands, Canada, Germany, and Singapore.
