= Bernard Moras =

20th and 21st-century Indian Catholic bishop

Bernard Moras Archbishop
- Church: Roman Catholic
- Archdiocese: Bangalore
- See: Bangalore
- Appointed: 22 July 2004
- Installed: 17 September 2004
- Term ended: 19 March 2018
- Predecessor: Ignatius Paul Pinto
- Successor: Peter Machado
- Previous posts: Bishop of Belgaum (1996–2004); Apostolic Administrator of Bellary (2006–2008); Archbishop of Bangalore (2004-2018); Apostolic Administrator of Mysore (2023-2025)

Orders
- Ordination: 6 December 1967
- Consecration: 25 February 1997 by cardinal Simon Ignatius Pimenta

Personal details
- Born: 10 August 1941 (age 84) Kuppepadavu, Mangaluru, India
- Motto: In thee we hope–Mary our Mother

Styles of Bernard Moras
- Reference style: The Most Reverend
- Spoken style: Your Grace
- Religious style: Monsignor
- Posthumous style: not applicable

Bernard Blasius Moras (born 10 August 1941) is an Indian prelate of the Roman Catholic Church and is the Archbishop Emeritus of the Archdiocese of Bangalore.

== Early life ==
Born in Kuppepadavu, Mangalore, Karnataka,

== Priesthood ==
Moras was ordained to the priesthood on 6 December 1967. During his priestly ministry, he was very involved with health care.

== Episcopate ==
On 30 November 1996, Moras was appointed Bishop of Belgaum by Pope John Paul II. He was consecrated on 25 February 1997 by Cardinal Simon Pimenta, with Bishops Aloysius D'Souza and Ignatius Pinto serving as co-consecrators. Moras chose as his episcopal motto: "In Thee We Hope–Mary Our Mother."

Moras was later named Archbishop of Bangalore on 22 July 2004, being installed on 17 September. The installation was attended by three cardinals and by all the priests of Bangalore diocese.

Pope Benedict XVI bestowed the pallium, a woolen garment reserved to metropolitan archbishops, upon Moras on 29 June 2005.

Moras condemned Dan Brown's novel The Da Vinci Code as "vicious" and "diabolic". He called all Christians to boycott the film version, which he requested of the Indian film board to be banned from the country.

Moras also chairs the Pastoral Commission for Health of the Catholic Bishops' Conference of India and is the Ecclesiastical Advisor to the Catholic Health Association of India.

Moras takes part in the documentary The Indian Priest about Indian missionary priest Raphael Curian from 2015.

Following the suspension of Bishop Kannikadass William Antony, Moras was appointed Apostolic Administrator of the Diocese of Mysore on 7 January 2023 by Pope Francis.

Catholic Church titles
Preceded by Ignatius Paul Pinto	Archbishop of Bangalore; 2004–present	Incumbent
