= Peter Machado =

Indian Catholic Archbishop of Bangalore

The Most Reverend Peter Machado Archbishop of Bangalore
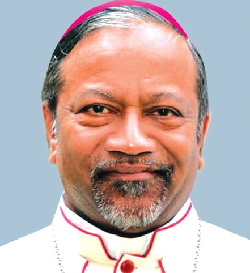
- Archdiocese: Bangalore
- Appointed: 19 March 2018
- Installed: 31 May 2018
- Predecessor: Bernard Moras
- Previous post: Bishop of Belgaum (2006-2018)

Orders
- Ordination: 8 December 1978 by William Leonard D'Mello
- Consecration: 30 March 2006 by Bernard Moras

Personal details
- Born: 26 May 1954 (age 72) Honnavar, Uttara Kannada, India

Styles of Peter Machado
- Reference style: The Most Reverend
- Spoken style: Your Grace
- Religious style: Monsignor
- Posthumous style: not applicable

Peter Machado is an Indian prelate of the Roman Catholic Church.

He was appointed Metropolitan Archbishop of Bangalore by Pope Francis and was installed in May 2018 as Archbishop of Bangalore.

Archbishop Peter Machado was born on 26 May 1954, in Honnavar. He was ordained a priest on 8 December 1978, for the Roman Catholic Diocese of Karwar, which had been created in 1976. He holds a doctorate in Canon Law from Pontifical Urban University, Rome, Italy. He was appointed Bishop of Belgaum Diocese on 2 February 2006, and was ordained as a bishop on 30 March that year.

Prior to his episcopal appointment, he completed his doctoral studies in Rome in Canon Law and then served as procurator, judicial vicar, consultor and secretary of the Karnataka Regional Bishops' Laity Commission, based in Bangalore. As the Metropolitan Archbishop of Bangalore, he's also the President of Karnataka Regional Catholic Bishops Council (KRCBC) and All Karnataka United Forum for Christian Human Rights.

== Reception ==
Archbishop Machado slammed the erstwhile BJP led Bommai Government for pushing for anti conversion bill and spreading rumors. He further criticized the move of the government to survey Christian Missionaries and called it unconstitutional.

He also raised concerns on the attack on Christians in Manipur violence.
