= Archdiocese of Bengaluru =

Roman Catholic archdiocese in Karnataka, India

Coordinates: 12.9926881°N 77.6112872°E

Archdiocese of Bangalore Archidioecesis Bangalorensis: ಬೆಂಗಳೂರು ಮಹಾಧರ್ಮಕ್ಷೇತ್ರ
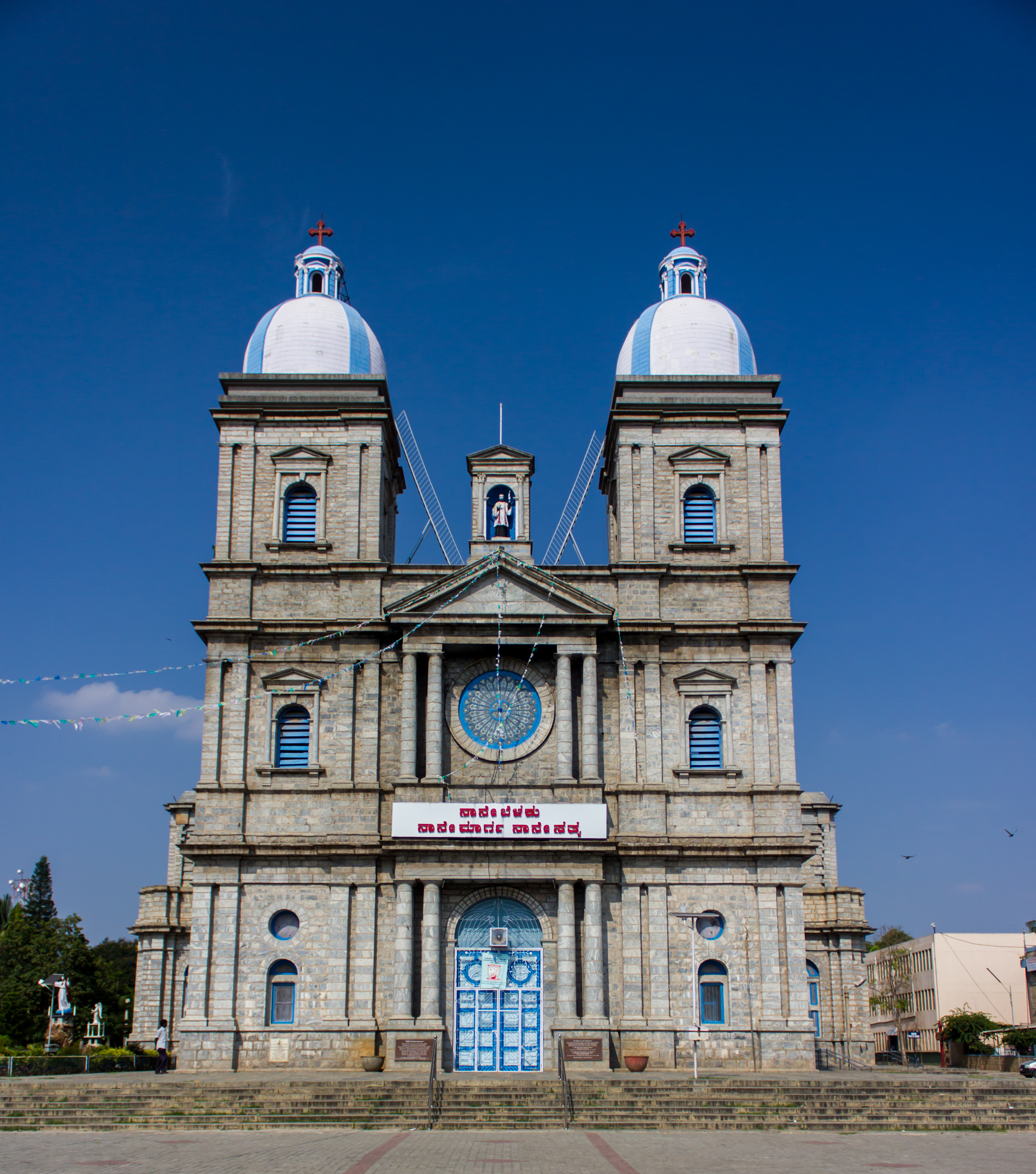
- St. Francis Xavier's Metropolitan Cathedral

Location
- Country: India
- Ecclesiastical province: Bangalore
- Headquarters: Bangalore

Statistics
- Area: 29,950 km^{2} (11,560 sq mi)
- Population: Total; Catholics: (as of 2022); 17,165,595; 360,561 (2.1%)
- Parishes: 126

Information
- Denomination: Roman Catholic
- Sui iuris church: Roman Church
- Rite: Latin Rite or Roman rite
- Established: 13 February 1940
- Cathedral: St. Francis Xavier's Cathedral, Bangalore
- Co-cathedral: St. Patrick's Church
- Patron saint: St. Francis Xavier
- Secular priests: 1632
- Language: Kannada Tamil English

Current leadership
- Pope: Leo XIV
- Metropolitan Archbishop: Peter Machado
- Auxiliary Bishops: Most Rev. Arokiaraj Satis Kumar, Most Rev. Joseph Susainathan
- Episcopal Vicars: Rt. Rev. Msgr. Xavier Manavath, CMF
- Bishops emeritus: Bernard Moras (2004-2018)

Map
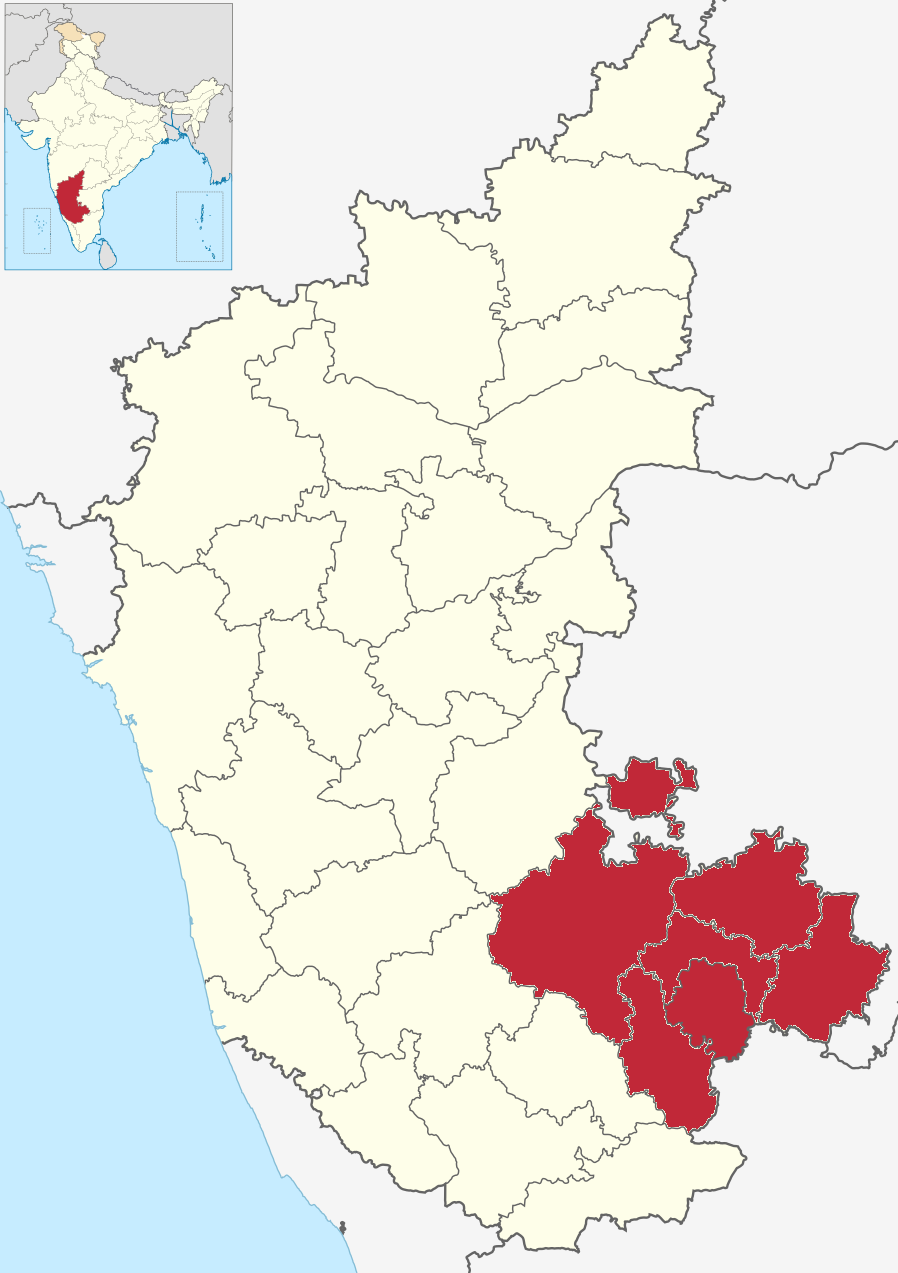

Website
- Website of the Archdiocese

The Roman Catholic Metropolitan Archdiocese of Bangalore (Latin: Archidioecesis Bangalorensis) is an ecclesiastical territory or diocese of the Catholic Church in India. It was erected as pro-vicariate from (16 March 1845 to 2 April 1850), as Vicariate from (3 April 1850 – 31 August 1886), as Diocese of Mysore – Bangalore in the Ecclesiastical Metropolitan Province of Pondicherry in Southern India from (1 September 1886 – 12 February 1940), as Diocese of Bangalore on 13 February 1940 by Pope Pius XII, and elevated to the rank of a Metropolitan Archdiocese on 19 September 1953, with the Suffragan Dioceses of Belgaum, Bellary, Chikmagalur, Gulbarga, Karwar, Mangalore, Udupi, Mysore, and Shimoga.

The archdiocese's mother church and thus seat of its archbishop is the St. Francis Xavier's Cathedral, Bangalore; Bangalore also houses St. Mary's Basilica. Bishop Peter Machado was appointed Archbishop of Bangalore by Pope Francis on 19 March 2018.

== History ==
The mission in the Kingdom of Mysore was entrusted to the Paris Foreign Missions Society in 1845, which became an apostolic vicariate in 1850 under the leadership of Bishop Charbonnaux. Mysore became a diocese in 1886, but it was around the city of Bangalore that missionary work developed with the creation of parishes, convents, and schools. During the 20th century, the city of Bangalore itself became much more important than Mysore. For example, in 1904 it hosted the 3rd National Eucharistic Congress of India, presided over by the Bishop of Dhaka, Bishop Peter Joseph Hurth.

== List of Vicar Apostolic, Bishop and Archbishops of Bangalore ==
- Bishop Etienne-Louis Charbonnaux, M.E.P. (1845–1873)
- Bishop Joseph-Auguste Chevalier, M.E.P. (1873–1880)
- Bishop Jean-Yves-Marie Coadou, M.E.P. (1880–1890)
- Bishop Eugène-Louis Kleiner, M.E.P. (1890–1910)
- Bishop Augustin-François Baslé, M.E.P. (1910–1915)
- Bishop Hippolyte Teissier, M.E.P. (1916–1922)
- Bishop Maurice-Bernard-Benoit-Joseph Despatures, M.E.P. (1922–1942)
- Archbishop Thomas Pothacamury (1942–1967)
- His Eminence Duraisamy Simon Lourdusamy (Auxiliary Bishop (1962–1964), Coadjutor Archbishop (1964-1967), Archbishop of Bangalore (1967–1971)
- Archbishop Packiam Arokiaswamy (1971–1986)
- Archbishop Alphonsus Mathias (1986–1998)
- Archbishop Ignatius Paul Pinto (1998–2004)
- Monsignor Thomas Jabamalai (Apostolic Administrator, Archdiocese of Bangalore (2004))
- Archbishop Bernard Blasius Moras (2004–2018)
- Archbishop Peter Machado (2018 – Present)

== List of Auxiliary Bishops of Bangalore ==
- His Eminence Duraisamy Simon Lourdusamy, Auxiliary Bishop (1962–1964) (Later Archbishop and Cardinal)
- Most Rev. Dr. Arokiaraj Satis Kumar, Auxiliary Bishop (2024-)
- Most Rev. Dr. Joseph Susainathan, Auxiliary Bishop (2024-)

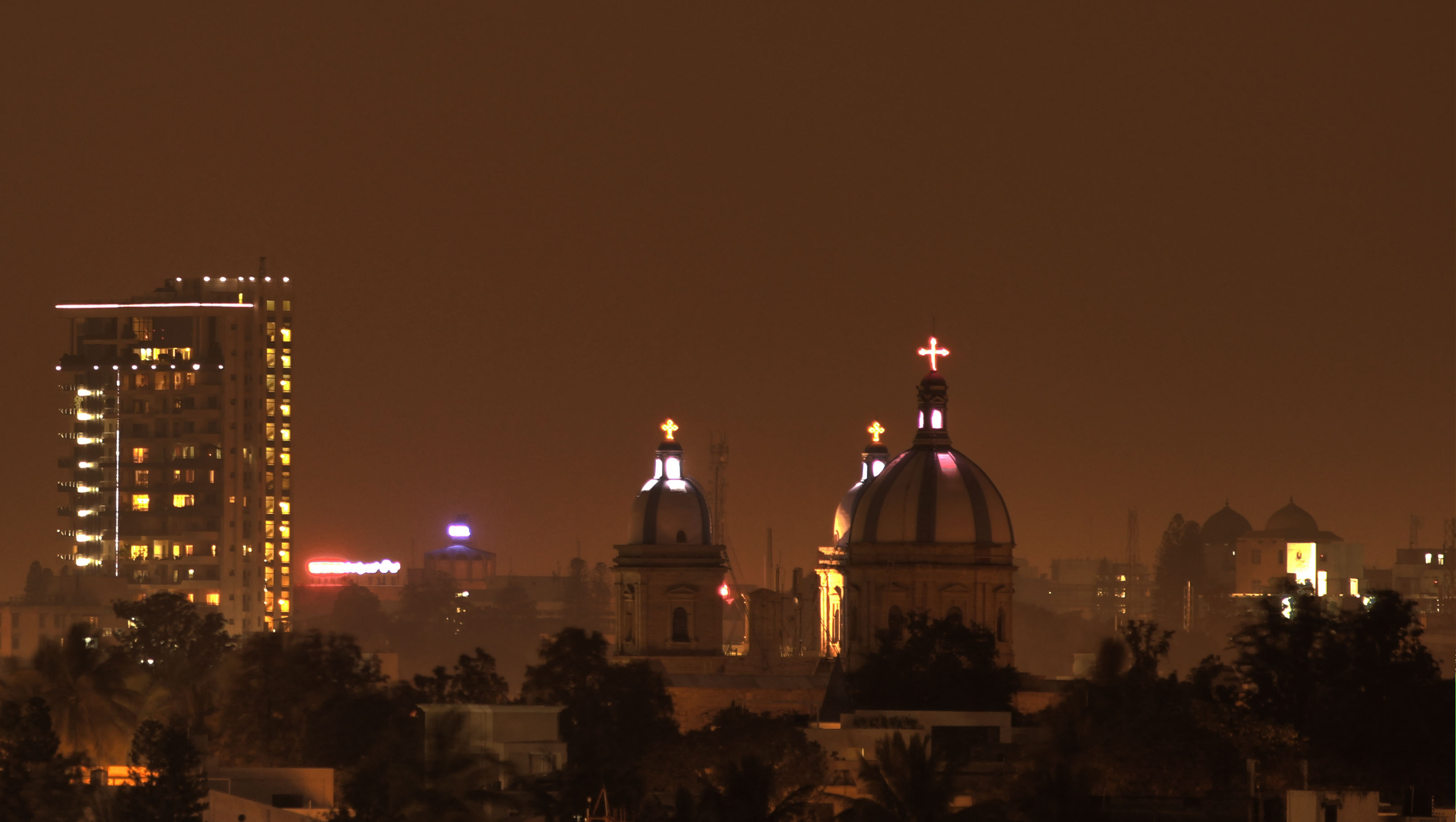
Domes and crosses of the St. Francis Xavier's Cathedral seen against the Bangalore skyline

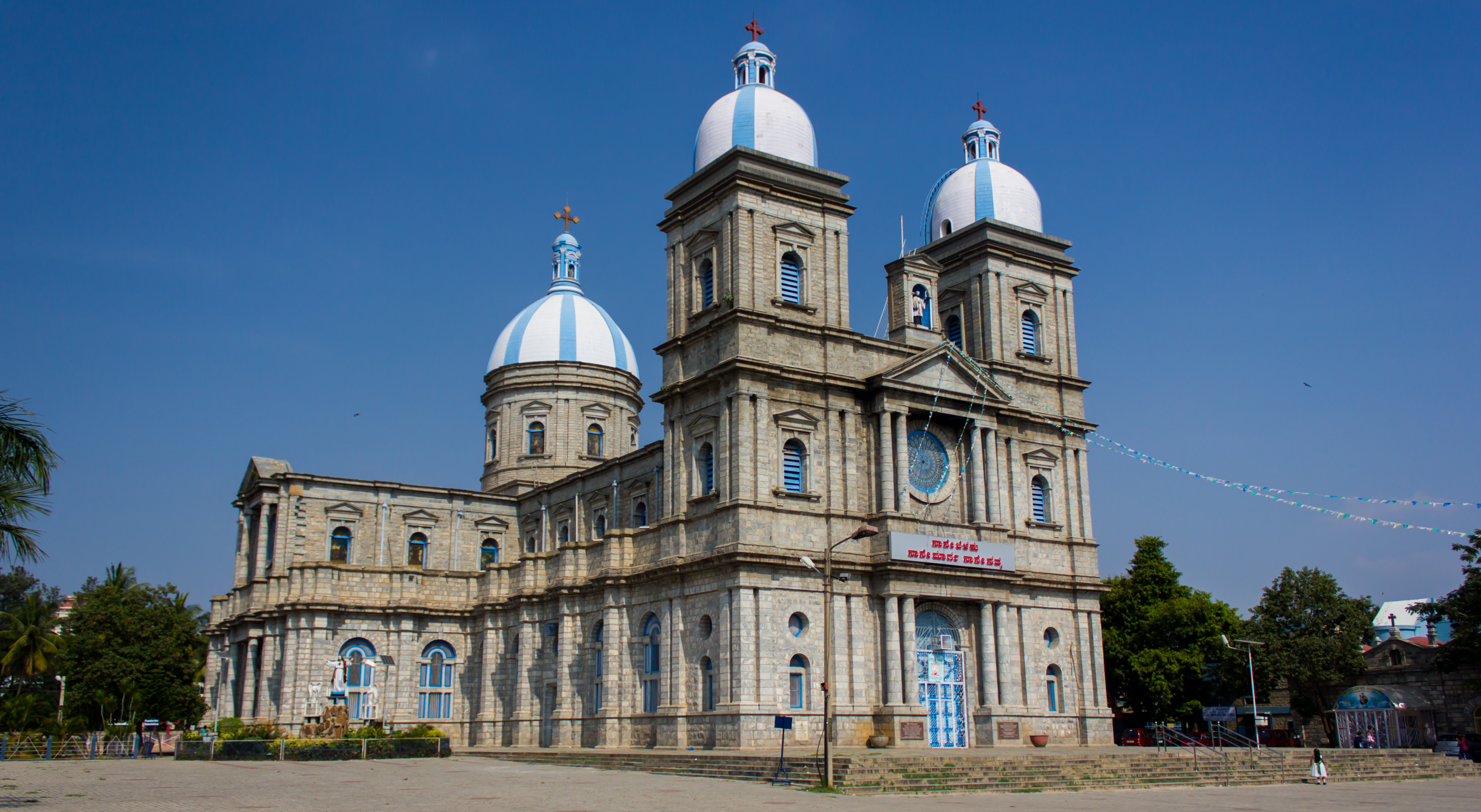
St. Francis Xavier's Cathedral

== Saints and causes for canonisation ==
- Ven. Veronica of the Passion (Sophia Leeves)
- Servant of God Teresa of St. Rose of Lima
- Servant of God Fr. Bastiampillai Anthonipillai Thomas

== See also ==
- Catholic Church in India
- Infant Jesus Church, Bangalore
