= St. Joseph's Cathedral, Imphal =

Coordinates: 24°51′03″N 93°55′57″E

St. Joseph's Cathedral
- St. Joseph's Cathedral, Imphal
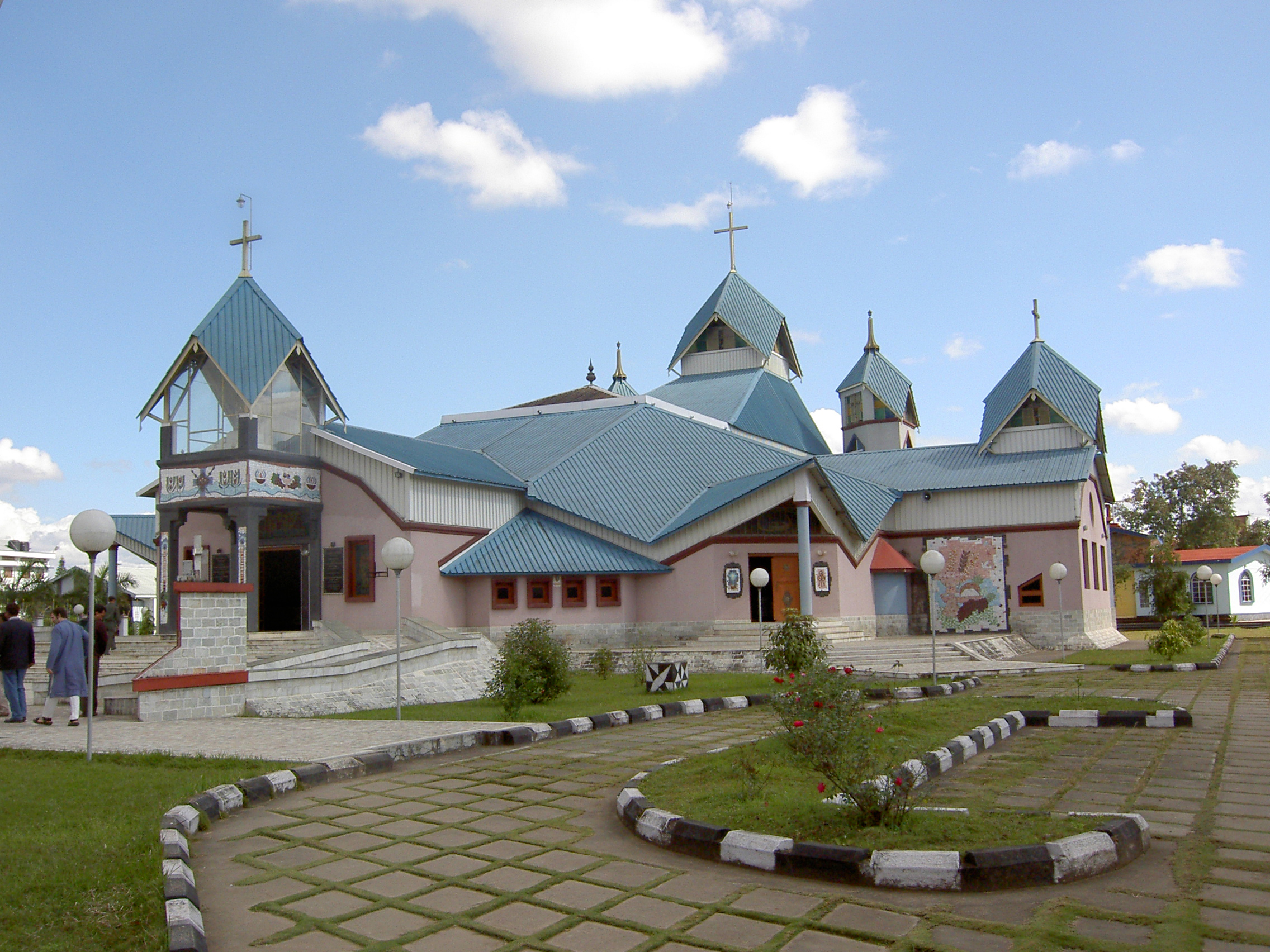
- St. Joseph's Cathedral
- Location: Imphal
- Country: India
- Denomination: Roman Catholic

History
- Status: Cathedral
- Founded: 1999; 27 years ago

Clergy
- Archbishop: Linus Neli

The Cathedral of St. Joseph, located in Imphal, Manipur, India, is the Latin cathedral of the Roman Catholic Archdiocese of Imphal and seat of the metropolitan bishop, currently Dominic Lumon.

The cathedral church, of an Anglo-Manipuri fusion design, is located at Mantripukhri, on the outskirts of the city, and was completed in 1999.

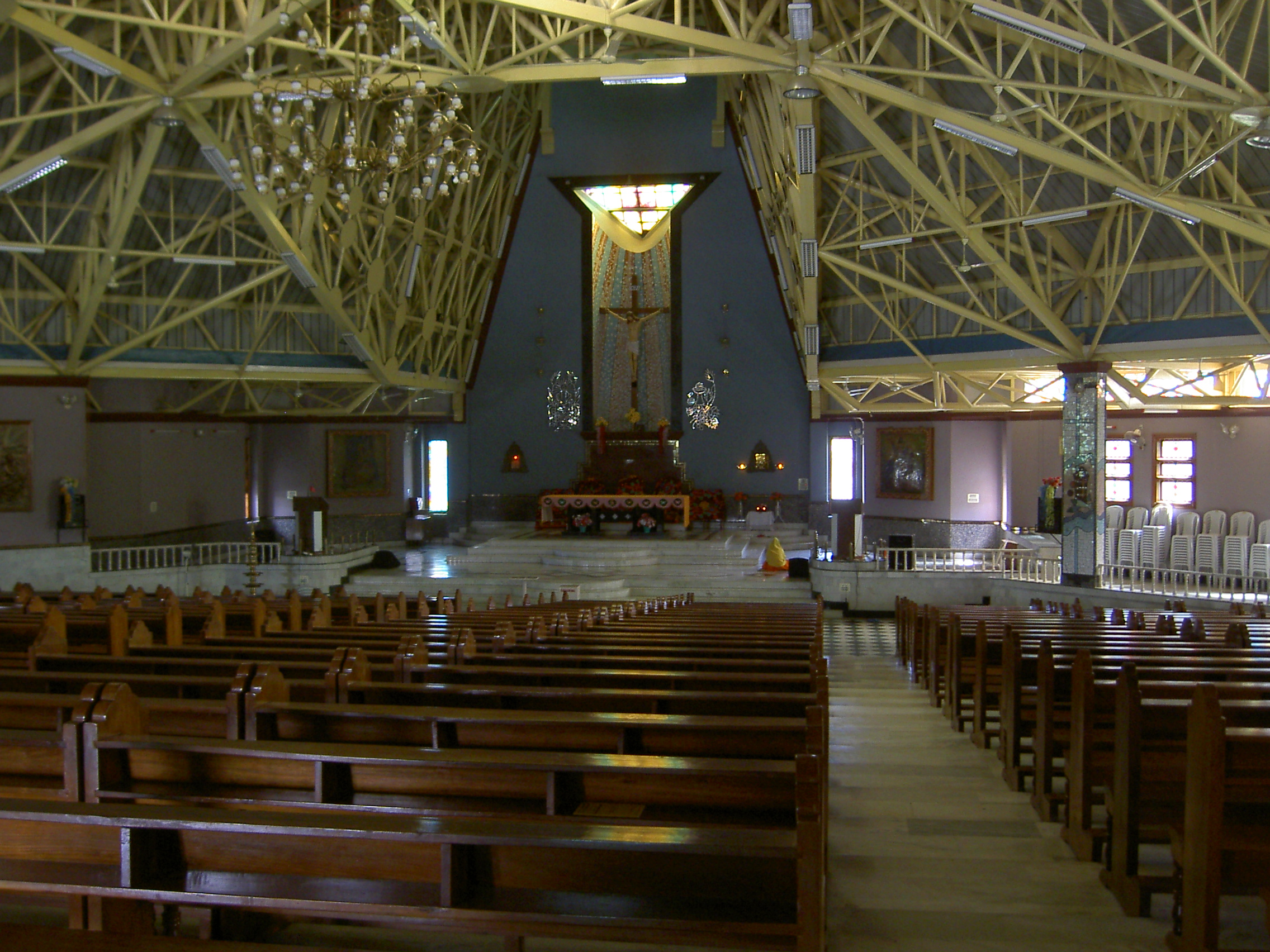
The interior of the cathedral
