= Mary Help of Christians Cathedral, Kohima =

Mary Help of Christians Cathedral
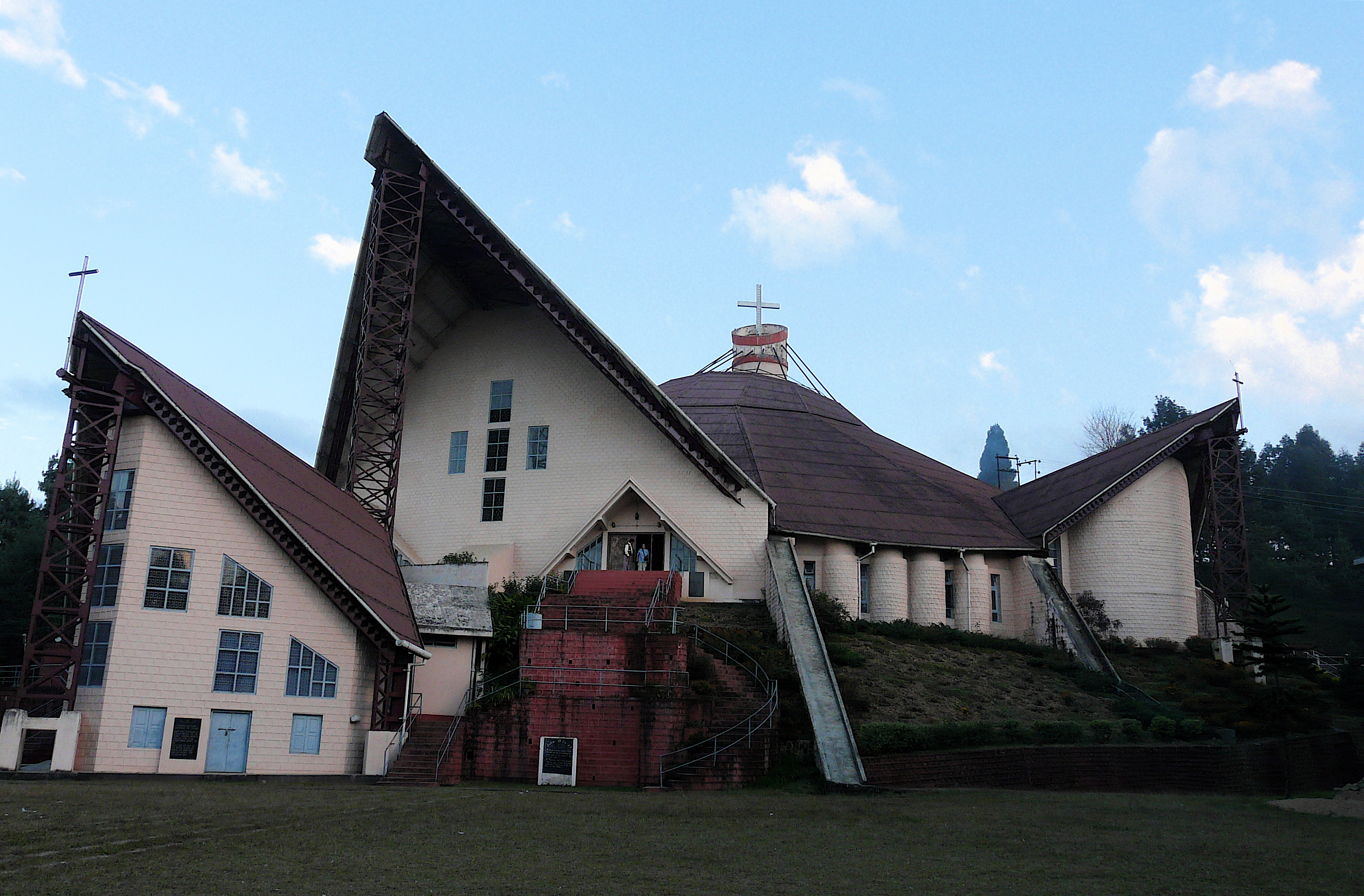
- Mary Help of Christians Cathedral in Kohima
- Mary Help of Christians Cathedral
- 25.6525°N 94.1048°E
- Location: Kohima, Nagaland
- Country: India
- Denomination: Catholic (Latin rite)
- Website: www.kohimadiocese.org/cathedral.html

History
- Status: Cathedral
- Founded: 1989; 37 years ago
- Consecrated: January 1991

Architecture
- Functional status: Active

Specifications
- Capacity: 4500

Administration
- Province: Roman Catholic Archdiocese of Imphal
- Diocese: Roman Catholic Diocese of Kohima

Clergy
- Bishop: James Thoppil

The Cathedral of Kohima (Mary Help of Christians Church) is the church of the bishop of the diocese of Kohima, and hence, the main church of this diocese of Nagaland, India. The church is noted for its architecture which incorporates many elements of traditional Naga houses, including its facade which resembles that of a Naga house. The architecture of the cathedral blends into the hill on which it is situated. The 16 feet high carved wood crucifix is one of Asia's largest crosses.

The cathedral was conceptualised by the first bishop of Kohima, Abraham Alangimattathil. The cathedral complex also contains Bishop Alangimattathil's tomb.

The construction commenced in 1986 and the church was consecrated in January 1991. The three-crore expense for constructing the cathedral was mostly funded by Japanese people who wished to construct a monument to the Japanese soldiers who died in the Battle of Kohima during the Second World War. For this reason, the following quote is engraved in the environs of the cathedral:

"...It is with thankfulness that we heard that a Catholic Cathedral was built at Kohima, where Mass would be offered every morning in the memory of the fallen..."

There is also another inscription near the entrance to the building:

"When you enter in here, bring before the Lord all those who gave their life and who will give their all, for your safer and better Nagaland."

The cathedral was used as the venue for reconciliation meetings between the Japanese and British veterans who fought each other during the war.

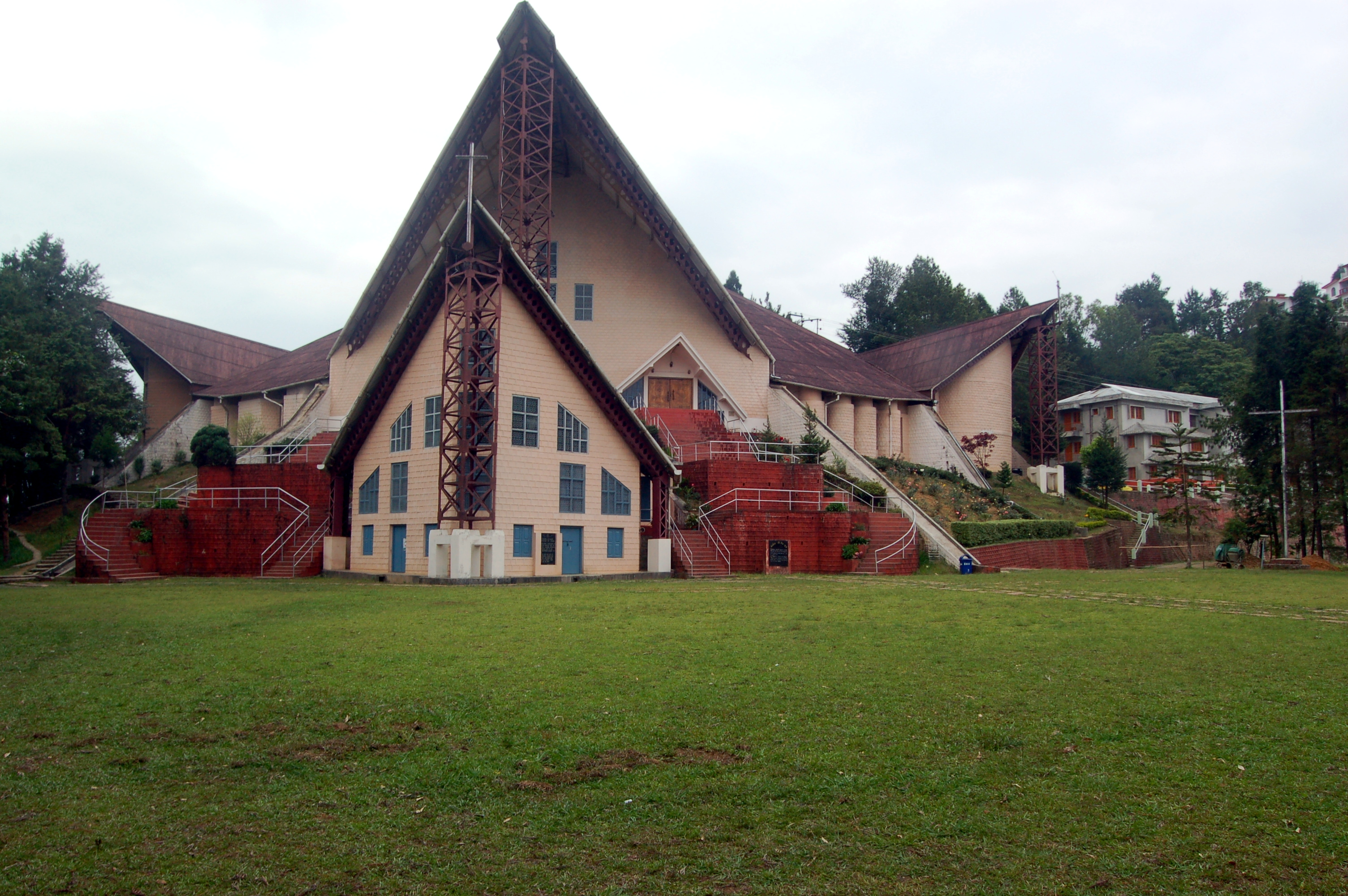
The cathedral
