= Augustin Bourry =

French Catholic priest

Servant of God Augustin-Étienne Bourry MEP
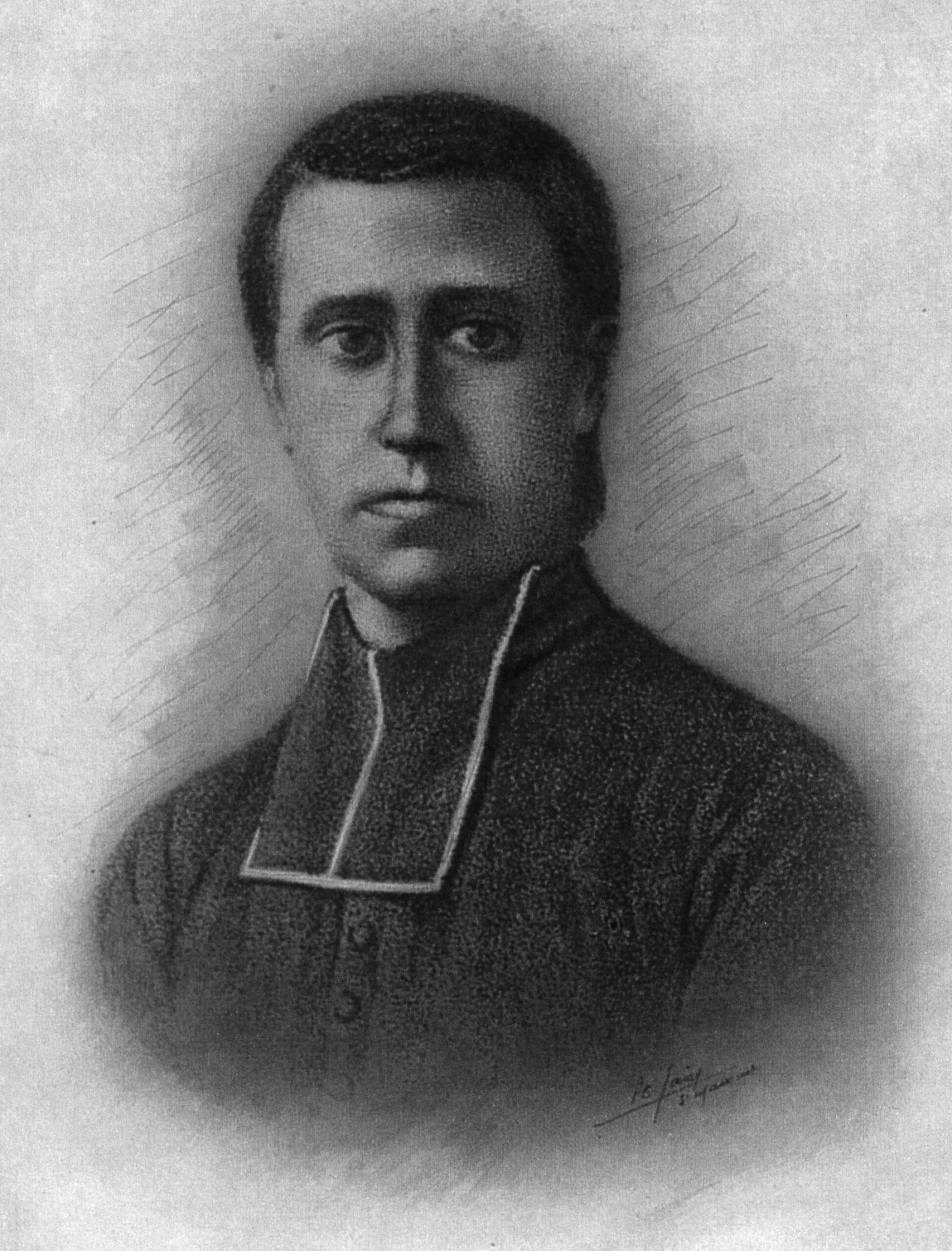
- Church: Catholic Church
- Diocese: Apostolic Vicariate of Lhasa
- Installed: 1853
- Term ended: 1854

Orders
- Ordination: 5 June 1852

Personal details
- Born: 27 December 1826 La Chapelle-Largeau, Deux-Sèvres, France
- Died: 1 September 1854 (aged 27) Sommeu, Tibet
- Denomination: Catholic
- Occupation: Missionary

Augustin-Étienne Bourry (27 December 1826 in La Chapelle-Largeau, Deux-Sèvres – 1 September 1854 in Tibet), known as Augustin Bourry, was a priest of the Society of Foreign Missions of Paris.

He entered the minor seminary at an early age to become a missionary and was ordained a priest despite many difficulties, particularly at school. He joined the Society of Foreign Missions of Paris at the same time as Théophane Vénard and was sent to Tibet to help with the new mission.

After a long journey, he was reunited with Nicolas Krick (also of the Society of Foreign Missions of Paris); the two missionaries attempted to penetrate Tibet via North India, and, although this latter had been there for only a short time, he was the only Westerner to have succeeded in this feat not long before.

The two friends entered Tibet, but were forced to turn back and leave the country. The chief of a neighboring tribe then murdered them and the motives for this double murder are unclear.

In the 1980s, a new Catholic community was born when some of the Tibetan frontiersmen converted to Christianity and considered the martyrdom of Nicolas Krick and Augustin Bourry as the founding act of their Church. A resumption of research was initiated as a result of this beatification process. They have been conferred the title of Servant of God in 2019.

== Biography ==
=== Youth ===
At the age of twelve, Augustin Bourry and his classmates attended a religious ceremony. The priest of the presbyteral school La Chapelle-Largeau presented them the relics of Jean-Charles Cornay, a missionary member of the Society of Foreign Missions of Paris, who had died a martyr. He added that he "would be happy if one of these children could later become a missionary like Mr. Cornay was". Augustin Bourry would later confide that from that day on, he was eager to respond to the priest's call.

In 1842, he entered the Collège de Saint-Maixent, and, although he had serious difficulties at school, the principal, who believed in him, kept him there and supported him. In 1847, he entered the minor seminary of Montmorillon where Théophane Vénard was his illustrious classmate and where he also had four difficult years. He remained in the bottom quarter of the class, so much so that he was denied entry to the major seminary.

Discouraged, Augustin Bourry returned to his family for a while and faced with his parents' concerns about his future, Augustin showed great self-confidence, assuring them that he would become a priest despite the difficulties. His somewhat excessive piety and almost obsessive desire to become a missionary eventually took their toll on his health. The young man imposed such severe penances on himself that his superior ordered him to limit and moderate them. Like Thérèse of Lisieux, he also suffered from scruples. He later described his condition to a colleague: "In my room, while I was working, I would think about it, and often, when I was writing, my pen would suddenly stop and I would think about being a missionary. During the breaks in the seminary, during the days I spent in Mauron, where I used the breaks so well to distract myself, I thought about being a missionary; at night I couldn't sleep, so strongly was this thought engraved in my mind".

Seminary professors described Augustin Bourry as stubborn, passionate, devout, respectful, and considerate of his superiors, but reserved with his fellow students. With the help of his spiritual director, he was able to free himself from his scruples and obsessions. As a result, he was able to continue his studies at the major seminary in Poitiers.

He was ordained subdeacon on 21 December 1850, at the same time as Théophane Vénard, and deacon on 4 July 1851. He could then enter the Society of Foreign Missions of Paris, where Vénard had preceded him in March 1851.

=== Society of Foreign Missions of Paris ===
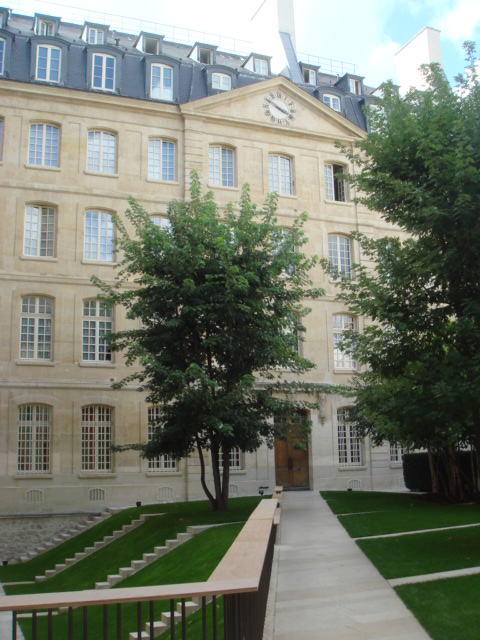
Building of the Society of Foreign Missions of Paris, 128 Rue du Bac, Paris.

Arriving in the capital in July 1851, he was immediately welcomed by the missionaries present.

His beginnings in Paris coincided with the resumption of the persecution of Christians in Asia: the martyrdom of Augustin Schoeffler in Tonkin and Jean-Baptiste Vachal in China. These victims only strengthened his desire to become a martyr. His ordination was postponed. On the domestic front, the coup d'état of 2 December 1851, by the President of the Republic, Louis Napoleon Bonaparte, the future Napoléon III, was the prelude to major political upheavals. Anecdotally, it is said that during a visit to Paris, he was shocked by the nudity of the statues and paintings. He went so far as to consider those in the Église de la Madeleine impious.

Although his training in the Society of Foreign Missions of Paris was carried out within a very strict framework, Augustin Bourry soon seemed to adapt to it. He discovered the importance of joy in the spiritual life: "Sadness is banished forever from this place. If one day you let a little sadness show on your face, and a director saw it, he would immediately go and find you, and you would return from him as cheerful as if you had never experienced happiness". He learned to play billiards and pétanque in the garden of the seminary. These new disciplines, as insignificant as they may seem at first glance, changed his behavior: he became firmer and more self-confident, and his activities revealed talents and intellectual abilities previously unknown.

Augustin was assigned to the infirmary where his duties included caring for two sick missionaries. In May 1852, an epidemic of paratyphoid fever broke out in the Society of Foreign Missions of Paris and took up all of his time.

On 5 June 1852 Augustin was ordained a priest at Notre Dame with five other seminarians, a deaco], and three subdeacons. The next day, the superior asked him to prepare for Korea, one of the most dangerous missions, however, Augustin, who was very happy with this destination, was forced to postpone his departure. Finally, on 28 July 1852 he was sent to Tibet, where Christianity was still completely unknown. His choice was motivated above all by his experience as a nurse. This part of the world suffers from diseases that require urgent and appropriate care. The Abor, Mishmi, and Tibetan tribes with whom Nicolas Krick came into contact were in dire need of health care.

A portrait of him taken by a photographer dates from this period and the Society of Foreign Missions of Paris sent it to his mother.

=== Missionary in Tibet ===
==== Crossing to India ====
On 12 August 1852 a large number of his parishioners made the journey on the occasion of his departure for the mission, and Augustin Bourry was moved by this gesture of attention. He took the train to Bordeaux with the Society of Foreign Missions of Paris confreres sent to India: Clovis Bolard, François Thirion, Jean-Denis David, François-Xavier Digard, and Charles Dallet, then, they embarked on the Vallée-le-Luz. Augustin took with him books in English, Hindustani, and Tibetan; a rifle and an accordion, all items that Nicolas Krick, who already was in Northern India, had requested and from where he planned to reach Tibet.

The Vallée-du-Luz docked at the Cape of Good Hope on 4 November 1852. The voyage was long and Augustin Bourry often suffered from seasickness, but it was also an opportunity for him to share the life of people who were strangers to the Church, especially the sailors, whose religious practice was almost non-existent. On 26 December 1852, after one hundred and twenty-four days at sea, the Vallée-du-Luz finally docked in Pondicherry, the first stop in India and it was Mr. Bonnard who welcomed the travelers.

Augustin discovered the country and its tropical heat. Also, the nudity of the Indians, far from shocking him like the statues and paintings of La Madeleine, touched him.

On 9 January 1853 he set sail again to Madras, where he stayed from 14 to 30 January. On 4 February 1853 he reached Calcutta, where he was well received by the monks. He continued to Guwahati, where Louis Bernard (also of the Society of Foreign Missions of Paris) was waiting for him. He fell ill and was confined to bed for several days.

==== Settling in North India ====
It was during a long stay in Guwahati that Louis Bernard told him of the difficulties he had encountered in the mission in Tibet. Augustin Bourry suffered from the precarious conditions in which the missionaries settled in this Assam town. In his correspondence, he mentions the serious difficulties of adaptation, especially to the climate. He wrote to his parents: "Difficulties of all kinds are before us: physical difficulties, moral difficulties, they exist, I can tell you, in the highest degree".

On 4 May 1853 he and Bernard thought they would find Nicolas Krick, who had become superior of the Tibet mission, in Nowgong, a town in the Madhya Pradesh district of Chhatarpur. However, in a letter, he invited them to join him in Saikhoa. So, Augustin set off alone on 20 June 1853, and after arriving at his destination on 22 July 1853 he learned that Krick, whose state of health was increasingly worrisome, had gone to Nowgong for treatment. Augustin decided to stay put and see what would happen and took advantage of his solitude to deepen his knowledge of English and the various local dialects.

In November 1853, Krick, who had recovered his health, returned to Saikhoa with Bernard. Bourry received word of their imminent arrival early the following month, and the three men were finally reunited on 10 December 1853. Krick informed his two companions that the Society of Foreign Missions of Paris had asked them to join another mission seeking to reach Tibet via China. A few days later, Krick and Bourry prepared the new expedition that would open the gates to Tibet and Bernard left the two missionaries for the South.

Krick, the first Westerner to enter Tibet on 5 January 1852, sought to pass through Abor territory to avoid the Mishmis. However, negotiations with the Abor failed and this solution proved unthinkable. On 19 February 1854 the two missionaries decided to travel up the Brahmaputra, which meant crossing Mishmi territory. After successfully hiring guides, they began the climb. But the difficulties were so great that on 24 February 1854 they were forced to change their route to continue the expedition. This change required porters, who had to be paid.

On 10 May 1854 Bourry managed to send a letter from a Mishmi village. Difficulties mounted for the two missionaries. On the one hand, their progress was very slow and, on the other hand, threats to their material and lives made it almost impossible to approach Tibet. On 25 July 1854 another letter from the two missionaries indicated their progress: They had reached Oualong; they were hungry and sick. The two priests lacked the necessary equipment. Augustin asked for waterproof shoes and a material to protect his books from the humidity. The conditions of the journey defied all hygienic principles: for example, they slept in the houses of the local people with their chickens and pigs.

==== Arrival in Tibet and assassination ====
The two missionaries reached the Tibetan village of Sommeu on 29 July 1854. Despite their extreme fatigue, they wrote a short letter - the last received from them - announcing their arrival in Tibetan territory.

Augustin Bourry was murdered on 1 September 1854 by members of the Mishmi tribe, along with Nicolas Krick. The motive for this murder is unclear. There are several versions: the guides accompanying Krick and Bourry claim that the tribal chief, Kaïsha, killed them when they were in their hut. Others refer to a dispute over a sheet that Krick failed to hand over as they passed through his lands.

As soon as news of the murder spread, the English launched a punitive expedition. During this expedition, they recovered the personal effects of Krick and Bourry. The tribal chief was sentenced to death, but thanks to Louis Bernard's intervention, his sentence was commuted to life imprisonment.

Interrogations revealed that only Bourry, who was ill, was inside the hut when he was murdered. Krick, on the other hand, was at the river's edge when he was thrown into it. The exact motives of Chief Kaïsha elude the investigators: theft, revenge, hostility to the Catholic religion, all these three options are probable.

When the Society of Foreign Missions of Paris learned of the death of the two missionaries in January 1855, the directors begged the Bishop of Calcutta to do everything in his power to ensure that the British government did not retaliate or intervene politically.

The fact that objects belonging to the two priests were found in Tibet in 1854, led Adrien Launay, priest and historian of the Society of Foreign Missions of Paris, to believe that the deaths of the two religious may have been ordered by the Tibetan authorities. Between 1852 and 1854, relations between the English and Tibetans were tense and the latter were said to have mistaken Krick and Bourry for Englishmen. This thesis is partially challenged by Laurent Deshayes in his book Tibet (1846-1952) because the Kaïsha tribal chief never mentioned Tibetans during interrogations.

== Religious Posterity ==
=== The beginnings of hagiography ===
Augustin Bourry's murder was quickly interpreted as martyrdom. The directors of the Society of Foreign Missions of Paris wrote to the Archbishop of Calcutta, comparing Bourry's death to that of the Vietnamese Martyrs: "Respect for their memory, which should remind the savage tribes among whom they passed only of the martyrs of charity and apostolic zeal, as well as the entirely spiritual character of their undertaking, from which they endeavored on every occasion to remove even the slightest hint of political views, seem to us sufficient reasons not to desire the intervention of the British government".

A few years later, in 1862, Auguste Desgodins tried to persuade the British government to initiate proceedings for the beatification of Krick and Bourry as martyrs. However, the directors of the Society of Foreign Missions of Paris did not respond favorably, believing that "martyrdom for the faith is not well established".

=== Posterity among the tribes of Assam ===
The Indian government's policy of protecting the tribes of Arunachal Pradesh led to missionaries being denied access to the region. It wasn't until 1978 that an Indian Salesian priest and school principal, Father Thomas Menamparampil, managed to renew contact with the Mishmis at the invitation of one of the tribal chiefs. During his visit, the tribal chief and his tribesmen converted to Catholicism. On 2 August 1979, nine hundred and twenty-four members of the Noctes tribe requested baptism.

Father Thomas Menamparampil wrote the biography of Nicolas Krick and Augustin Bourry from the bishop's archives. This hagiography increased devotion to the two missionaries considered the founders of the Church of Arunachal Pradesh. In 1981 Menamparampil was appointed Bishop of Dibrugarh and set about organizing the evangelization of the region. In 1983, a school was opened, which increased conversions.

In 1991 Menamparampil renewed contact with the Society of Foreign Missions of Paris, who discovered the influence of Krick and Bourry in the region. In 1993, the first church was consecrated in the presence of Mother Teresa. The new Christians officially request the beatification of Krick and Bourry, whose trial is underway. The Society of Foreign Missions of Paris is once again interested in the two missionaries and supported the publication of the writings of Krick and Bourry, as well as the history of the first mission to Northern Tibet. In 1999, historian Françoise Fauconnet-Buzelin publishes Les Porteurs d'espérance, La mission du Tibet-Sud published by Les éditions du Cerf.

== Bibliography ==
- Fauconnet-Buzelin, Françoise (1999). Les porteurs d'espérance : La mission du Tibet-Sud (1848-1854) (in French). Les éditions du Cerf. ISBN 978-2204062398.
- Deshayes, Laurent (2008). Tibet (1846-1952) : Les missionnaires de l'impossible (in French). Les Indes Savantes. ISBN 978-2-84654-098-8.
- Buzelin, Juliette; et al. (Études et documents) (2001). Tibet Terre Promise Le journal de Nicolas Krick : missionnaire et explorateur (1851-1852) (in French). Paris Foreign Missions Archive, Churchs of Asia - History series. ISBN 9782914402354.
- Fauconnet-Buzelin, Françoise (2001). Mission Unto Martyrdom: The Amazing Story of Nicolas Krick and Agustine Bourry, the First Martyrs of Arunachal Pradesh. Don Bosco Centre for Indigenous Cultures.

== See also ==
- Catholic Church in Tibet
- Diocese of Kangding
