= Diocese of Itanagar =

Roman Catholic diocese in Arunachal Pradesh, India

Coordinates: 27.1033°N 93.6321°E

Diocese of Itanagar Dioecesis Itanagarensis

Location
- Country: India
- Ecclesiastical province: Guwahati
- Metropolitan: Guwahati
- Deaneries: 4

Statistics
- Area: 52,283 km^{2} (20,187 sq mi)
- Population: Total; Catholics: (as of 2023); 782,900; 86,800 (11.1%)
- Parishes: 50

Information
- Denomination: Catholic
- Sui iuris church: Latin Church
- Rite: Roman Rite
- Established: 7 December 2005; 20 years ago
- Cathedral: Cathedral of St Joseph in Itanagar
- Patron saint: Saint Joseph
- Secular priests: 127 (29 Diocesan, 98 Religious Orders)

Current leadership
- Pope: Leo XIV
- Bishop: Benny Varghese Edathattel
- Metropolitan Archbishop: John Moolachira
- Bishops emeritus: John Thomas Kattrukudiyil

Website
- dioceseofitanagar.org

The Roman Catholic Diocese of Itanagar (Dioecesis Itanagarensis) in India was created on 7 December 2005 by splitting it from the Diocese of Tezpur. It is a suffragan diocese of the Archdiocese of Guwahati. Its first bishop was John Thomas Kattrukudiyil. The St. Joseph's church in Itanagar is the cathedral of the diocese.

The diocese covers 10 districts of the state of Arunachal Pradesh - Tawang, West Kameng, East Kameng, Papum Pare, Upper Subansiri, Lower Subansiri, Kurung Kamay, West Siang, East Siang and Upper Siang. Neighboring dioceses are the Diocese of Tezpur to the south, the Diocese of Miao to the east, Diocese of Darjeeling in Bhutan to the west, and Diocese of Kangding in Tibet to the north.

The diocese covers an area of 52,283 km². As of 2023, 86,800 (11.1% of 782,900 total) persons in the area are members of the Catholic Church. The diocese is subdivided into 50 parishes.

== Ordinaries ==
Bishops of Itanagar (Roman Rite)

- John Thomas Kattrukudiyil (7 December 2005 – 29 June 2023), retired
  - Apostolic Administrator John Thomas Kattrukudiyil (29 June 2023 – 15 October 2023), Bishop Emeritus of Itanagar
- Benny Varghese Edathattel (29 June 2023 – Present)

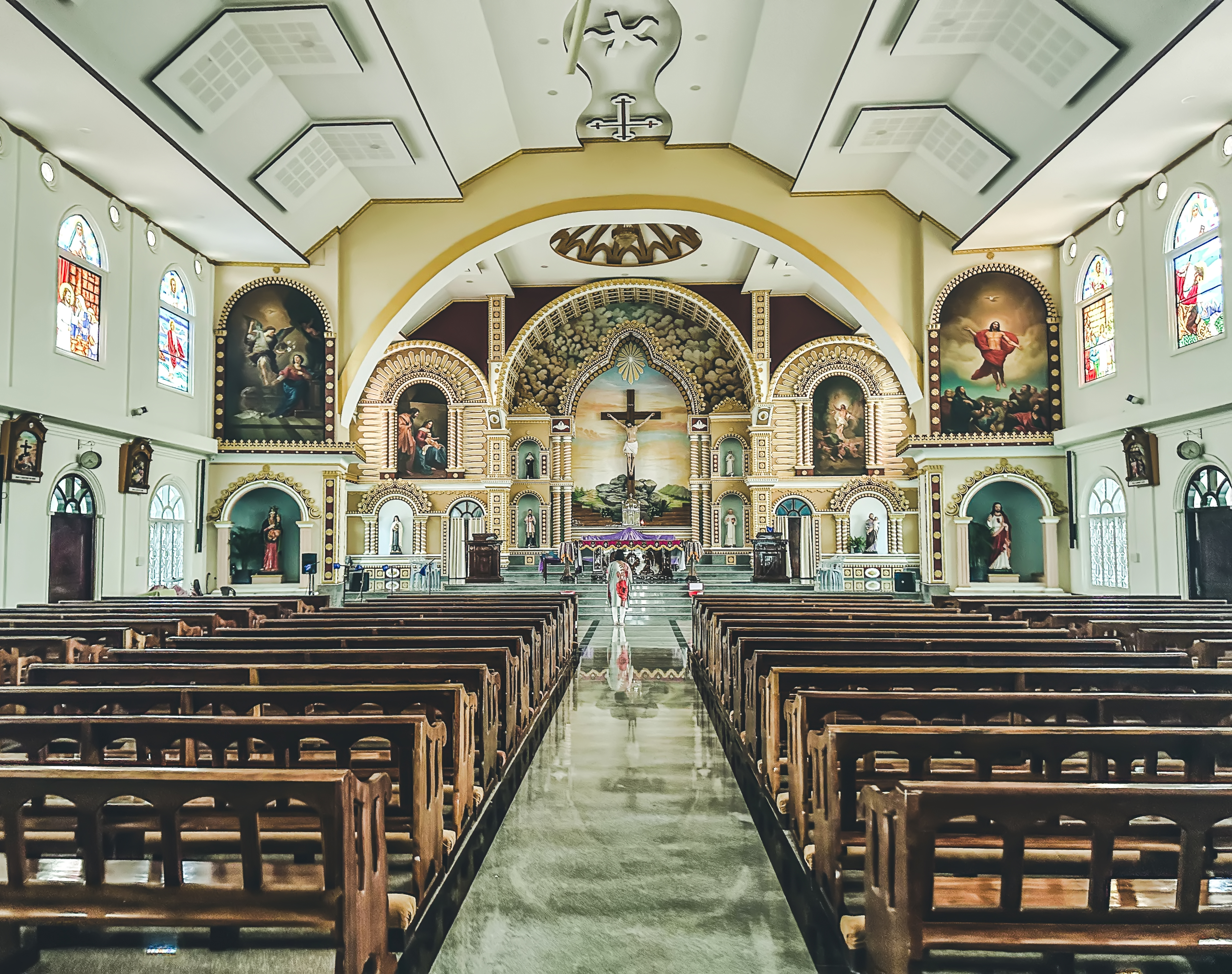
The Roman Catholic Diocese of Itanagar (Dioecesis Itanagarensis) in India was created on 7 December 2005 by splitting it from the Diocese of Tezpur.
