= Diocese of Miao =

Roman Catholic diocese in Arunachal Pradesh, India

Coordinates: 27.4846°N 96.2077°E

Diocese of Miao Dioecesis Miaoensis मियाओ के सूबा

Location
- Country: India
- Ecclesiastical province: Guwahati
- Metropolitan: Guwahati

Statistics
- Area: 43,955 km^{2} (16,971 sq mi)
- Population: Total; Catholics: (as of 2020); 508,000; 98,600 (19.40%)
- Parishes: 30

Information
- Denomination: Catholic
- Sui iuris church: Latin Church
- Rite: Roman Rite
- Established: 7 December 2005
- Cathedral: Cathedral of Christ the Light in Miao
- Patron saint: Christ the Light

Current leadership
- Pope: Leo XIV
- Bishop: George Palliparampil
- Metropolitan Archbishop: John Moolachira

Website
- miaodiocese.in

The Roman Catholic Diocese of Miao (Latin: Dioecesis Miaoensis) is a diocese in the ecclesiastical province of Guwahati. It is located in Miao in India.

It was created on 7 December 2005, by splitting it from the Diocese of Dibrugarh. Its first bishop is George Palliparampil. The Christ the Light Shrine in Miao is the cathedral of the diocese. The cathedral was built and blessed in 2011.

The diocese covers 8 districts of the state of Arunachal Pradesh - Tirap, Changlang, Lohit, Longding, Anjaw, Namsai, Dibang Valley and Lower Dibang Valley Districts. Neighboring dioceses are Itanagar and Dibrugarh to the west. To the north and northeast is China, to the south and southeast Myanmar.

The diocese covers an area of 31,445 km^{2}. As of 2005, 59,030 of the 420,000 people in the area are members of the Catholic Church. The diocese is subdivided into 31 parishes.

== Saints and causes for canonisation ==
- Servants of God Fr. Nicolas-Michel Krick, MEP and Fr. Augustin-Etienne Bourry, MEP
