= Diocese of Kohima =

Roman Catholic diocese in Nagaland, India

Coordinates: 22.3180°N 73.1839°E

Diocese of Kohima Dioecesis Kohimaensis
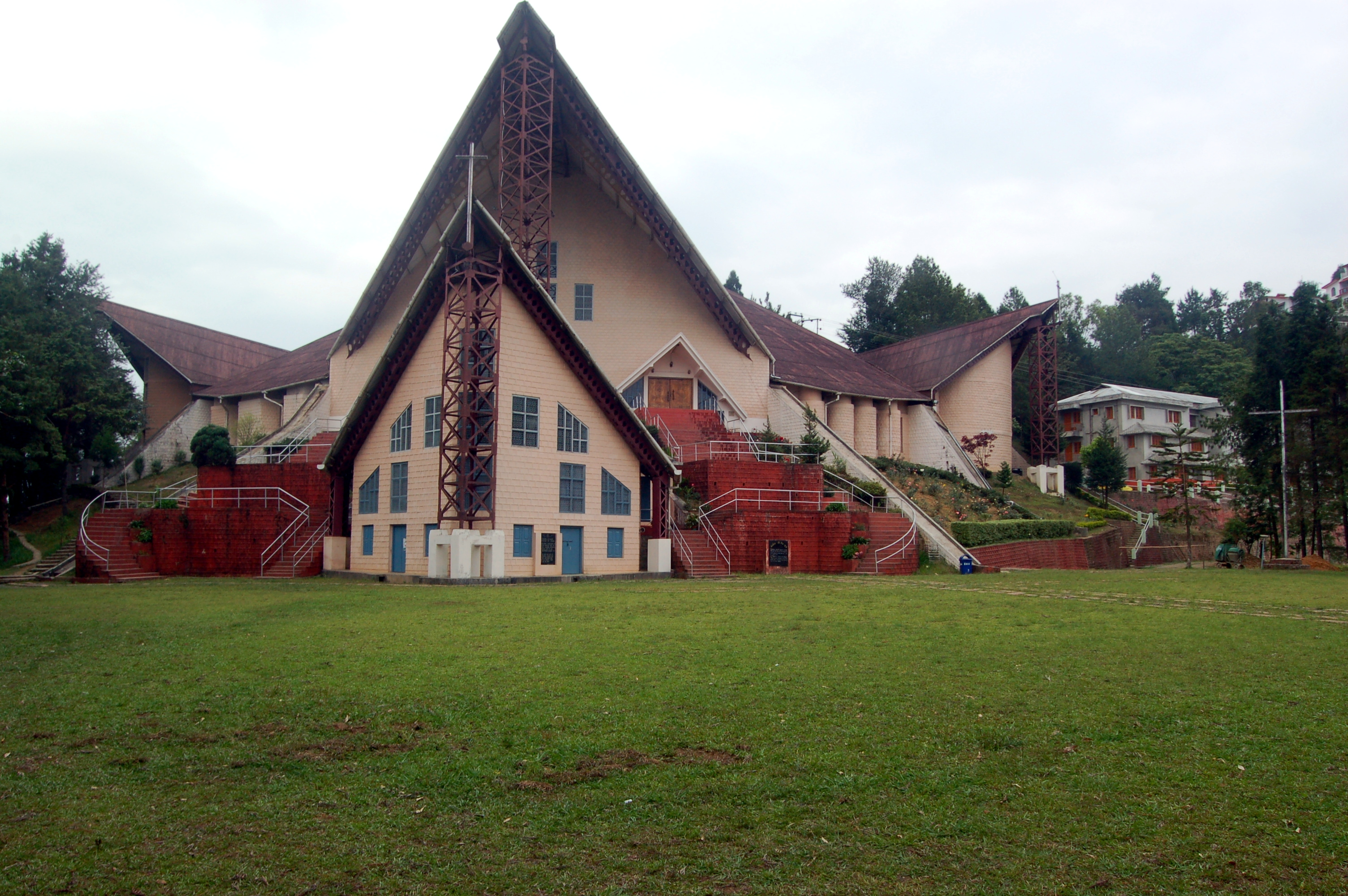

Location
- Country: India
- Ecclesiastical province: Imphal
- Metropolitan: Imphal

Statistics
- Area: 16,579 km^{2} (6,401 sq mi)
- Population: Total; Catholics: (as of 2019); 2,427,000; 61,731 (2.5%)
- Parishes: 52

Information
- Rite: Latin Rite
- Established: 29 January 1973; 53 years ago
- Cathedral: Mary Help of Christians Cathedral
- Patron saint: Mary Help of Christians
- Secular priests: 86

Current leadership
- Pope: Leo XIV
- Bishop: James Thoppil
- Metropolitan Archbishop: Dominic Lumon
- Bishops emeritus: Jose Mukala Bishop Emeritus (1998-2009)

Website
- Website of the Diocese

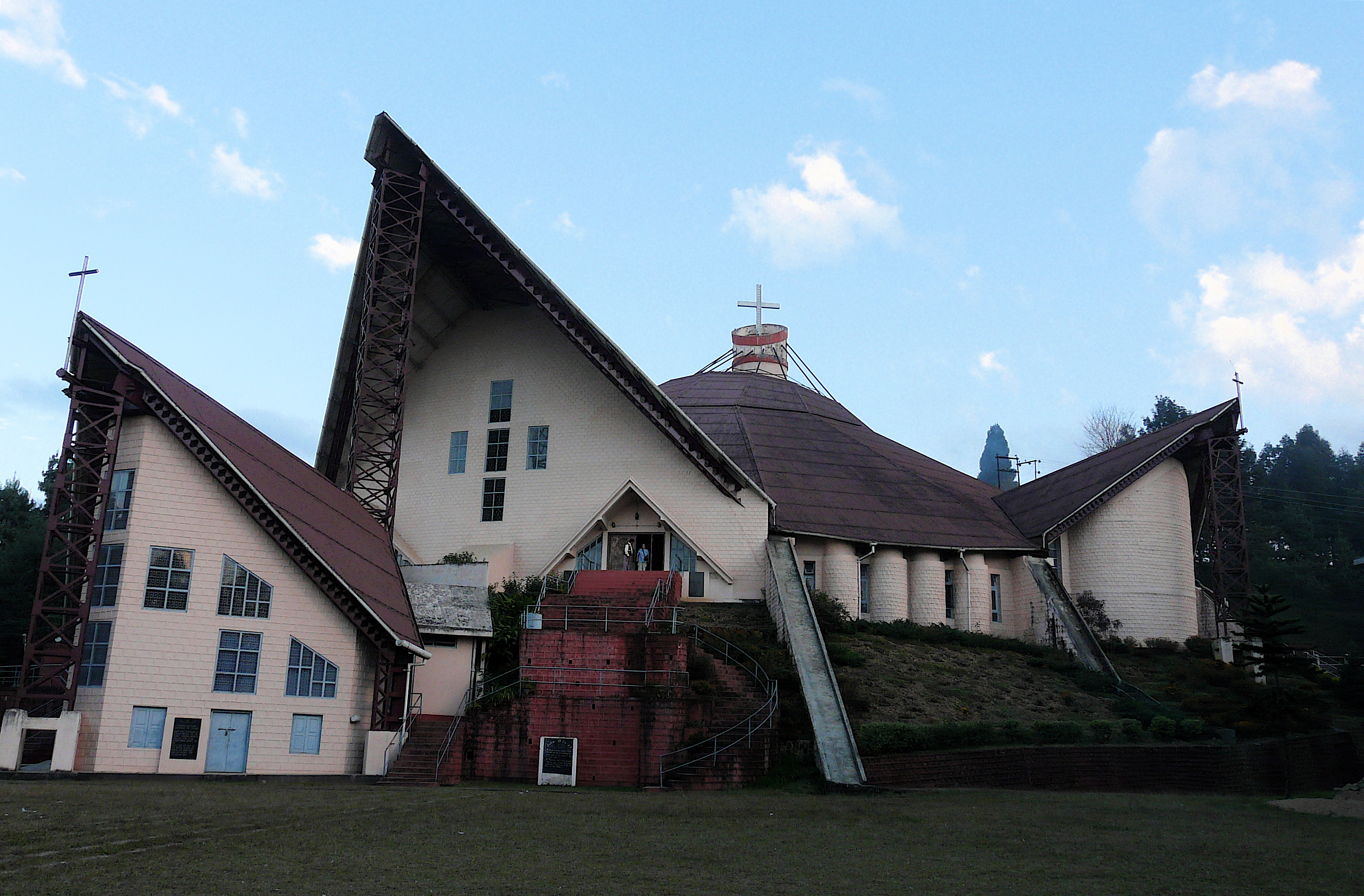
Mary Help of Christians Cathedral, Kohima

The Roman Catholic Diocese of Kohima (Latin: Kohimaen(sis)) is a diocese headquartered in the city of Kohima, Nagaland, in the ecclesiastical province of Imphal in India. Its territory includes the entire state of Nagaland.

== History ==
- 29 January 1973: Established as Diocese of Kohima–Imphal from the Diocese of Dibrugarh
- 28 March 1980: Erected as Diocese of Kohima through the division of the Diocese of Kohima–Imphal

== Leadership ==
- Bishops of Kohima (Latin Rite)
  - Bishop James Thoppil (16 June 2011 – present)
  - Bishop Jose Mukala (24 October 1997 – 30 October 2009)
  - Bishop Abraham Alangimattathil, S.D.B. (28 March 1980 – 11 July 1996)
- Bishops of Kohima–Imphal (Latin Rite)
  - Bishop Abraham Alangimattathil, S.D.B. (29 January 1973 – 28 March 1980)
