= Thomas Pulloppillil =

Most Reverend Thomas Pulloppillil
- Bishop of Bongaigaon
- Archdiocese: Guwahati
- Diocese: Bongaigaon
- Appointed: 10 May 2000
- Successor: Incumbent
- Other post: Chairman of Seminary Formation Commission of the North East Bishops' Council
- Previous posts: Administrator of Oriens Theological College, Shillong

Orders
- Ordination: 6 Apr 1981
- Consecration: 20 Aug 2000 by Thomas Menamparampil

Personal details
- Born: 14 June 1954 (age 71) Kottayam, Kerala
- Denomination: Roman Catholic
- Motto: TO BUILD AND TO PLANT

Thomas Pulloppillil is the serving bishop of the Roman Catholic Diocese of Bongaigaon and a writer.

== Early life ==
He was born in Nadukani, Kothamangalam, Kerala, India, on 14 July 1954.

== Religious life ==
He was ordained a priest on 6 April 1981. He was appointed Bishop of Bongaigaon on 10 May 2000 and ordained on 20 August 2000 by Thomas Menamparampil. He has served as administrator of Oriens Theological College, Shillong. He is the chairman of Seminary Formation Commission of the North East Bishops' Council.
