= Joseph Aind =

Indian prelate (born 1945)

Most Reverend Joseph Aind, SDB
- Bishop Emeritus of Dibrugarh
- Archdiocese: Guwahati
- Diocese: Dibrugarh
- Appointed: 11 November 1994
- Term ended: 15 February 2021
- Predecessor: Thomas Menamparampil
- Successor: Albert Hemrom
- Other post: Chairman of Social Communication Commission North Eastern Regions Bishop council

Orders
- Ordination: 27 November 1976
- Consecration: 19 March 1995 by Thomas Menamparampil

Personal details
- Born: 5 November 1945 (age 80) Nahorani Assam India
- Denomination: Roman Catholic
- Motto: SERVE AND HOPE

Bishop Joseph Aind, S.D.B. is an Indian prelate who served as bishop of the Roman Catholic Diocese of Dibrugarh.

== Early life ==
Joseph was born in Nahorani, Assam, India on 5 November 1945.

== Priesthood ==
Joseph was ordained a priest for the congregation of the Salesians of Don Bosco on 27 November 1976.

== Episcopate ==
Joseph Aind was appointed Bishop of Dibrugarh on 11 November 1994 and ordained on 19 March 1995 by Thomas Menamparampil. He is the Chairman of Social Communication Commission in the North Eastern Regions Bishop council. On 15 February 2021 Aind stepped down as bishop of Dibrugarh after reaching the mandatory retirement age of 75, and was replaced by Albert Hemrom.
