= Albert Hemrom =

Indian prelate (born 1970)

Most Reverend Albert Hemrom
- Bishop of Dibrugarh
- Archdiocese: Guwahati
- Diocese: Dibrugarh
- Appointed: 2 December 2018
- Installed: 15 February 2021
- Predecessor: Joseph Aind

Orders
- Ordination: 25 April 1999
- Consecration: 3 March 2019

Personal details
- Born: 27 February 1970 (age 56) Konapathar, Tinsukia, Assam, India
- Denomination: Roman Catholic
- Parents: Cyril Hemrom and Josephine Purty
- Education: Pontifical Lateran University

Albert Hemrom is an Indian prelate of the Roman Catholic Church who serves as Bishop of the Diocese of Dibrugarh in Assam, India. He succeeded Bishop Joseph Aind, S.D.B., on 15 February 2021, becoming the first diocesan priest of Dibrugarh to be appointed bishop since the establishment of the diocese on 12 July 1951.

== Early life and family ==
Hemron was born on 27 February 1970 in Konapathar, Tinsukia, Assam, India to Cyril Hemrom and Josephine Purty. He is the eldest of six siblings, with two brothers and three sisters.

He completed his early schooling at an Assamese-medium primary school in his village and later attended Don Bosco School, Doom Dooma, where he first encountered diocesan priests and Salesian missionaries, influences that contributed to his vocational discernment. At the age of 14, he expressed his desire to enter the seminary.

== Seminary formation and academic studies ==
He began his ecclesiastical formation at St. Joseph’s Minor Seminary, Dibrugarh, after which he pursued undergraduate studies at:

- Christ the King College, Shillong — Philosophy & B.A., 1993
- Oriens Theological College, Shillong — Bachelor of Theology (B.Th.), 1999

Following ordination, he was sent for advanced canonical studies, obtaining:

- Licentiate in Canon Law (J.C.L.), St. Peter’s Pontifical Institute, Bangalore (2003)
- Doctorate in Canon Law (J.C.D.), Pontifical Lateran University, Rome (2014)

His canonical training later shaped his service as Judicial Vicar and professor of Canon Law.

== Priestly ministry ==
Hemrom was ordained a priest for the Roman Catholic Diocese of Dibrugarh on 25 April 1999 at Philobari, Assam. During his priestly ministry, he served the diocese in pastoral, academic, and administrative capacities. His assignments included:

- Assistant Parish Priest, St. Francis of Assisi Church, Rajabari (1999–2001)
- Prefect of Studies, St. Joseph’s Minor Seminary, Dibrugarh (2003–2006)
- Parish Priest, St. Francis of Assisi Church, Rajabari (2006–2011)
- Visiting Professor, Oriens Theological College, Shillong (from 2006)
- Judicial Vicar, Diocesan Tribunal (from 2014)
- Rector, St. Joseph’s Minor Seminary (from 2014)

He also held multiple diocesan responsibilities, serving as:

- Member of the College of Consultors
- Member of the Presbyteral Council
- Vocation Promoter
- Secretary for Laity and Family Commission

His academic expertise made him a reference figure in the field of Canon Law within the Church of Northeast India.

== Episcopal ministry ==
=== Appointment as coadjutor bishop ===
On 2 December 2018, Pope Francis appointed Hemrom as Coadjutor Bishop of Dibrugarh, granting him the right of succession. News of his appointment was announced concurrently in Rome and in Dibrugarh and was received with enthusiasm by the clergy and the laity, as he was one of the youngest prelates in the Northeast at the time.

His episcopal consecration took place on 3 March 2019 at the grounds of the Bishop’s House, Dibrugarh, in the presence of bishops from across Northeast India, clergy, religious, and a large number of faithful.

=== Bishop of Dibrugarh ===
Hemrom automatically succeeded to the office of the bishop of the diocese on 15 February 2021 upon the retirement of Bishop Joseph Aind. As bishop, Hemrom oversees the Catholic presence across several civil districts of Upper Assam, including Tinsukia, Dibrugarh, Sivasagar, Charaideo, Majuli, Jorhat, and Golaghat, a region with significant tribal, tea-garden, and rural Catholic Communities.

He is the Chairman Bishop of two NEIRBC Commissions namely:

- Commission for Canon Law and Legislative Texts
- Commission for Social Communication—NESCOM
