= Nicolas Krick =

French Catholic priest

Servant of God Nicolas-Michel Krick MEP
- Priest
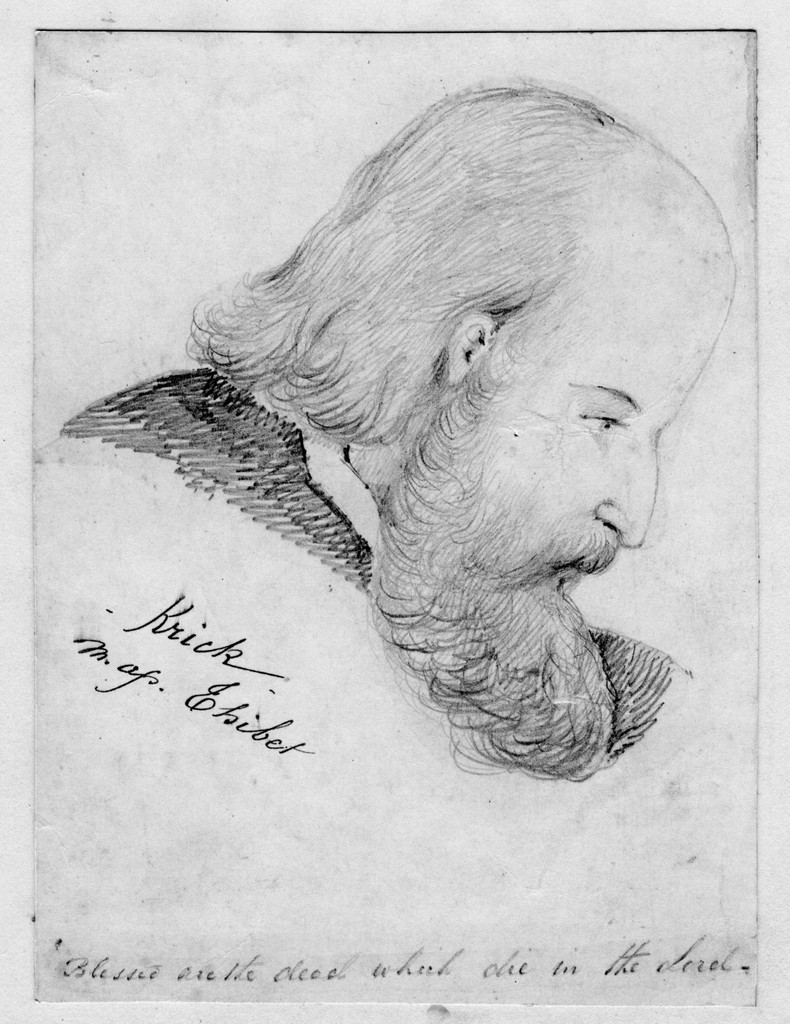
- Fr. Krick, drawing, 2nd half 19th century.
- Church: Catholic Church
- Diocese: Apostolic Vicariate of Lhasa
- Installed: 1852
- Term ended: 1854

Orders
- Ordination: 1 June 1844

Personal details
- Born: 1 March 1819 Lixheim, Meurthe, France
- Died: 1 September 1854 (aged 35) Sommeu, Tibet
- Denomination: Catholic
- Occupation: Missionary

Nicolas-Michel Krick (born March 1, 1819, in Lixheim, Meurthe, died September 1, 1854) was a priest from Lorraine who became a missionary with the Paris Foreign Missions Society in 1848. He was murdered with Augustin Bourry while attempting to reach Tibet.

Born into a Lorraine family with democratic political leanings, he entered the seminary in 1839 and was ordained priest in 1843. After a few years as a priest, he joined the Paris Foreign Missions. He was sent on a mission to Tibet with three other confreres. As it was impossible to reach Tibet via China, which forbade foreigners to enter its territory, they left for North India in order to discover a passage to Tibet via the South. After several months of unsuccessful attempts, Nicolas Krick became the first European to reach Tibet by this route. He wrote about his crossing of North India and his experiences in Relation d'un voyage au Thibet par M. l'abbé Krick, then sent it to Paris. His Relation considerably advanced our then very limited knowledge of the Mishmi tribes and Tibet. After gaining access, he was forced to leave Tibet due to the threats he faced.

He returned to the Assam valley (North India) and fell ill. After several months of recovery, he returned to Tibet, accompanied by Augustin Bourry, a new missionary. They struggled to reach the Tibetan border, only to be murdered in circumstances that remain a mystery. His death was soon considered a martyrdom by Catholics.

While Nicolas Krick was best known for his Relation d'un voyage au Thibet par M. l'abbé Krick, the rapid conversion of Mishmi tribes to Christianity at the end of the 20th century gave Nicolas Krick and Augustin Bourry a new notoriety. With the two missionaries now considered by the new converts to be the founders of their Church, the local bishop decided to initiate the procedure for their beatification. They have been conferred the title of Servant of God in 2019.

Nicolas Krick's writings, and in particular his diary, are a reference for ethnologists studying the tribes of North India, particularly the Mishmis. His descriptions of places and local customs are the main written sources of the 19th century for these tribes, who have only oral traditions.

== Biography ==
=== Youth ===
Michel Krick married Élisabeth Dubourg, a gardener's daughter, and opened a tailor's store. Their first child was Catherine, born in 1816. On March 1, 1819, in Lixheim (Meurthe), Michel was born, actually named after his godfather: Nicolas. Three other children followed: Joseph in 1823, Nicolas Alexis in 1824 and Marie-Élisabeth in 1826. Marie-Élisabeth's birth in 1826 went badly, and Élisabeth died in childbirth. Nicolas Krick was orphaned at the age of seven. His father Michel married Anne Prévost, also a widow. Nicolas spent many hours in his father's store. The contact he had with his customers shaped his sensitivity to women, a trait that is easily reflected in his writings and sermons.

Very little information is available about Nicolas Krick's childhood and adolescence. However, his later writings make it clear that he grew up in a relatively liberal atmosphere, very much in favor of democracy and freedom. His father's wife, Anne Prévost, a former military wife, must have shared the ideas of her former Republican husband. Nicolas Krick's eclectic reading list ranges from Romantic writers like Chateaubriand to Voltaire and Rousseau.

He entered the major seminary in Nancy on November 4, 1839. Even if we don't know what Nicolas Krick was doing at the time, we do know that entrance to the seminary required knowledge of Latin. The son of a craftsman, Nicolas had a somewhat atypical profile, given that the seminary was mainly composed of the sons of notables and peasants.

The Nancy seminary is based on the Sulpician model, with training focused on devotional exercises, meditation and prayer. Studies focus on theology and Sacred Scripture. The Nancy seminary has adopted very rigorous and demanding rules. It also possesses a large library (the most extensive of any French seminary at the time), an asset for the intellectual dynamism of the establishment, which goes hand in hand with its great respect for individual freedom of thought. In one of his sermons, Nicolas Krick defended freedom of conscience, a favorite theme in the age of anticlericalism: "Those who believed that they were suffocating the Church itself by this means were far from foreseeing that this freedom of conscience, which in their hands was nothing but an instrument of destruction and death, was to serve the supreme triumph: religious truth."

In his fourth year at the seminary, his confrere was Augustin Schoeffler. They were born in neighboring towns and entered the Paris Foreign Missions. It was perhaps at this point that Nicolas Krick's missionary vocation was born. In 1842, he became a sub-deacon. On December 13, 1843, he was ordained deacon, and on June 1, 1844, priest, at the age of twenty-four, like most priests of his time.

=== Lorraine priest ===
After his ordination, he was appointed vicar at Gerbéviller in Meurthe-et-Moselle, then in 1847 second vicar of Phalsbourg (Moselle), the parish where Augustin Schoeffler was originally from. Nicolas Krick wrote down all his sermons; seventy-two from the Gerbéviller and Phalsbourg periods are preserved in the archives of Foreign Missions. Their style shows that he was very demanding spiritually towards his parishioners.

In 1848, as the Revolutions shook Europe, Nicolas Krick kept a close eye on events in his parish: his homilies defended a liberal Catholicism, as evidenced by their titles "Seule la religion donne la vraie liberté" ("Only religion gives true freedom") or "Nécessité de la religion dans la démocratie" ("Necessity of religion in democracy").

In his homilies, Nicolas Krick also showed himself to be an ardent patriot, a patriotism that did not prevent him from taking the necessary steps to become a missionary in Asia. On August 21, he announced his possible departure for the Paris Foreign Missions, and on October 28, 1848, he was accepted as an aspirant, along with Théophane Vénard and Augustin Bourry. During his years in Paris, he developed a close relationship with his followers. The correspondence he kept up after his departure shows that he maintained the friendships he had forged during this period of his life.

=== The Paris Foreign Missions ===
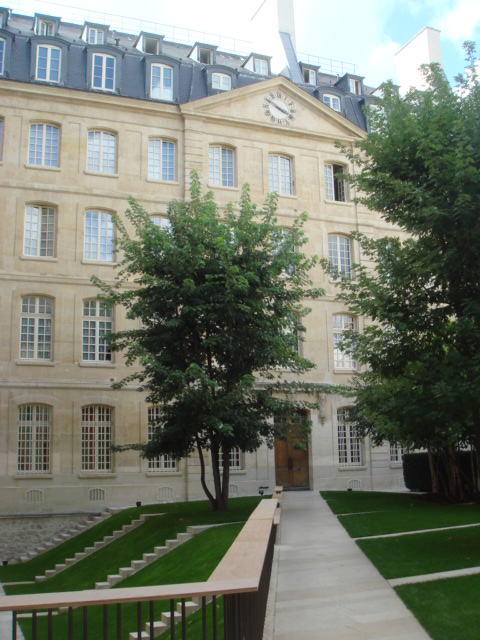
Seminary of the Paris Foreign Missions, 128 rue du Bac, Paris.

One possible explanation for his entry into the Paris Foreign Missions is his meeting with Augustin Schoeffler, who also joined. Another possible reason is his reading of the Annales de la Propagation de la foi (Annals of the Propagation of the Faith), which recount the lives of missionaries, and were widely read at the time. His faith undoubtedly also played an important role, as did his abandonment to Providence and his meditations on the missions, which we discover in one of his homilies: "When man, by his submission to God's guidance, has elevated himself far beyond the sphere of his fears and hopes, thus enhancing the noble privilege of his reason by the kind of abandonment he makes of it into the hands of the One on whom he depends (...) I believe because God has spoken to me, because his apostles have spoken. I believe because thousands of martyrs have sealed with their blood the truths proposed to my faith." Nicolas Krick sees the missionary vocation as the pinnacle of the Christian life: "The servant is no more than the master, (...) to give one's life to announce the good news was the right path to heaven, (...) if those who throw themselves into fire, into water, into the mouth of the cannon to save mortal lives are rewarded, there is also a reward for the missionary."

The background to his entry into the Paris Foreign Missions was turbulent: the revolution of 1848 led to the establishment of the Second Republic in France. The previous year, Pope Gregory XVI had erected the Apostolic Vicariate of Lhasa (March 27, 1847), in Tibet, and entrusted it to the Paris Foreign Missions. Sending missionaries to Tibet was made difficult by opposition from the Buddhist Lamas.

Facing difficulties and opposition from the Chinese, the Missions' superiors sought to penetrate Tibet via the South, India and the Himalayas. This solution was favored by the fact that the vicar of Bengal was seeking to rid himself of responsibility for the Assam region, north of Kolkata: he saw in the arrival of the Paris Foreign Missions the possibility of relieving himself of this immense region where Catholics were few in number. The Assam region was attached to the Apostolic Vicariate of Lhasa.

Two problems remain. Firstly, no Westerner had ever crossed the Himalayas from the south to reach Tibet, and the missionaries had no information on how to get there. On the other hand, as this mission was quite difficult and dangerous, the superiors of the Paris Foreign Missions had to find relatively experienced people. After several months of gathering information on the most suitable candidates, they chose Julien Rabin, Nicolas Krick and Louis Bernard, all already ordained priests with pastoral experience. They received specific training in preparation for the mission: learning English and Tibetan with Philippe-Édouard Foucaux, the first French Tibetologist, as well as studying medicine at Necker Hospital on the advice of missionaries who had managed to cross into Tibet via China. After several months' preparation, longer than the usual period, the three confreres were sent by the superior of the Foreign Missions, Father Charles-François Langlois, and left for Portsmouth on December 23, 1849.

=== Missionary in Tibet ===
==== Preparing the Tibetan mission in India ====
Assam region in northern India, through which he chooses to access Tibet.

Their ship set sail from Portsmouth on January 1, 1850, and they arrived in Chennai on April 26, 1850. They were welcomed by the English archbishop, Monsignor Farrell, who put them up and announced their arrival in the Catholic Bengal newspaper. The welcome was warm, but the three missionaries soon fell ill, suffering from miliaria rubra. After a few days, they left for Kolkata for Ascension Day. The English were very interested in their mission, but the English press was less interested in the missionary aspect than in the route to Tibet, which had never been explored before.

The superiors of the Paris Foreign Missions decided to appoint Julien Rabin superior of the mission. He sent them regular reports on the expedition's progress. In order to get closer to Tibet, the missionaries left Kolkata on June 14, 1850, to settle in Guwahati in the Assam region. They then realized the difficulty of the task: the multiplicity of dialects and languages would make their progress very difficult. So they decided to study them for six hours a day.

The mission's superior, Julien Rabin, wanted to make Guwahati the center of the mission, even though it was far from Tibet. He wrote to his superiors to tell them of his desire to build a college there in order to spread Catholicism in the region and make the town the center of their activities. His plans seem increasingly unrealistic. Living conditions are very basic: the missionaries are housed in an unsanitary bungalow, and Julien Rabin is frequently ill. Following his letters, the superiors of the Paris Foreign Missions call Julien Rabin to order, pointing out that the Paris Foreign Missions have neither the financial nor the human resources to found this college, and that the objective assigned is Tibet, not the Assam region.

Tensions began to arise between the missionaries: Julien Rabin decided to delegate some of his authority to Louis Bernard, and Nicolas Krick was sent on a mission to Upper Bengal at the request of the Bishop of Dhaka. Although his trip was initially scheduled to last only six weeks, Nicolas Krick spent four months among the region's small Christian communities. The only account of this period is a very favorable comment by Monsignor Carrew to the Governor General of India on learning of Nicolas Krick's death: "I knew Nicolas Krick personally. He was an extremely kind and talented man."

Meanwhile, the two missionaries Julien Rabin and Louis Bernard attempted expeditions to Tibet, but fell ill. Louis Bernard went to Goalpara for treatment, then returned to Guwahati on February 1, 1851, the same day that Julien Rabin fell ill. Rabin nevertheless embarked on an expedition, but the hostility of the regions he crossed, the lack of a guide and his illness forced him to turn back.

==== First attempts to explore North India ====
On March 30, 1851, Nicolas Krick returned from his mission and decided to explore again on his own. He sailed up the Brahmaputra to try and find a passage to Tibet, heading for the Abors, Mishmis and Khamtis tribes. He set off with the English, arriving at Saikhoa on September 26, and realized that crossing the Abor territories was impossible due to the hostility of the Mishmis. He asked the English to help him cross the Abor-inhabited areas. They refused, saying they could not guarantee his safety. The Abors have tattoos in the shape of a cross, which intrigues him greatly: he sees in them the sign of a very ancient evangelization. He returns to the Lohit region to prepare a new expedition, despite the fact that all the English explorers who preceded him had failed, in 1826, 1837 (with William Griffith) and 1846.

Unable to pass through the Abor territories, Nicolas Krick continued on his way, passing through Mangaldoi on May 28, 1851. He discovered a road to Lhasa that was passable from November to February. On learning that a priest was needed, he left for Nowgong, where he was welcomed by a French doctor, Monsieur Pingault, and began his first mission among the few converts present. He gives First Communion to the baptized adults, and converts the doctor's wife to Catholicism, who is very impressed by his preaching and asks to be baptized.

Meanwhile, the situation in Guwahati deteriorated: cholera and the town fire complicated the lives of the two missionaries who remained there. They attempted a mission of exploration in Mangaldai, near Bhutan. They fall ill. Suffering from dysentery, they returned to Guawahati. This setback, and the succession of illnesses, proved too much for Julien Rabin's determination. After going to Goalpara for treatment, he secretly decided to abandon the mission and return to France: he did not inform Louis Bernard of this decision, nor did he wait for Nicolas Krick to return. It wasn't until early 1852 that Louis Bernard informed the Paris Foreign Missions of the departure of the mission's former superior. He himself decided to rent a small room to save money. A few months later, he learned of Nicolas Krick's return to Guawahati.

==== First exploration of Tibet ====
===== Exploring the Himalayas =====
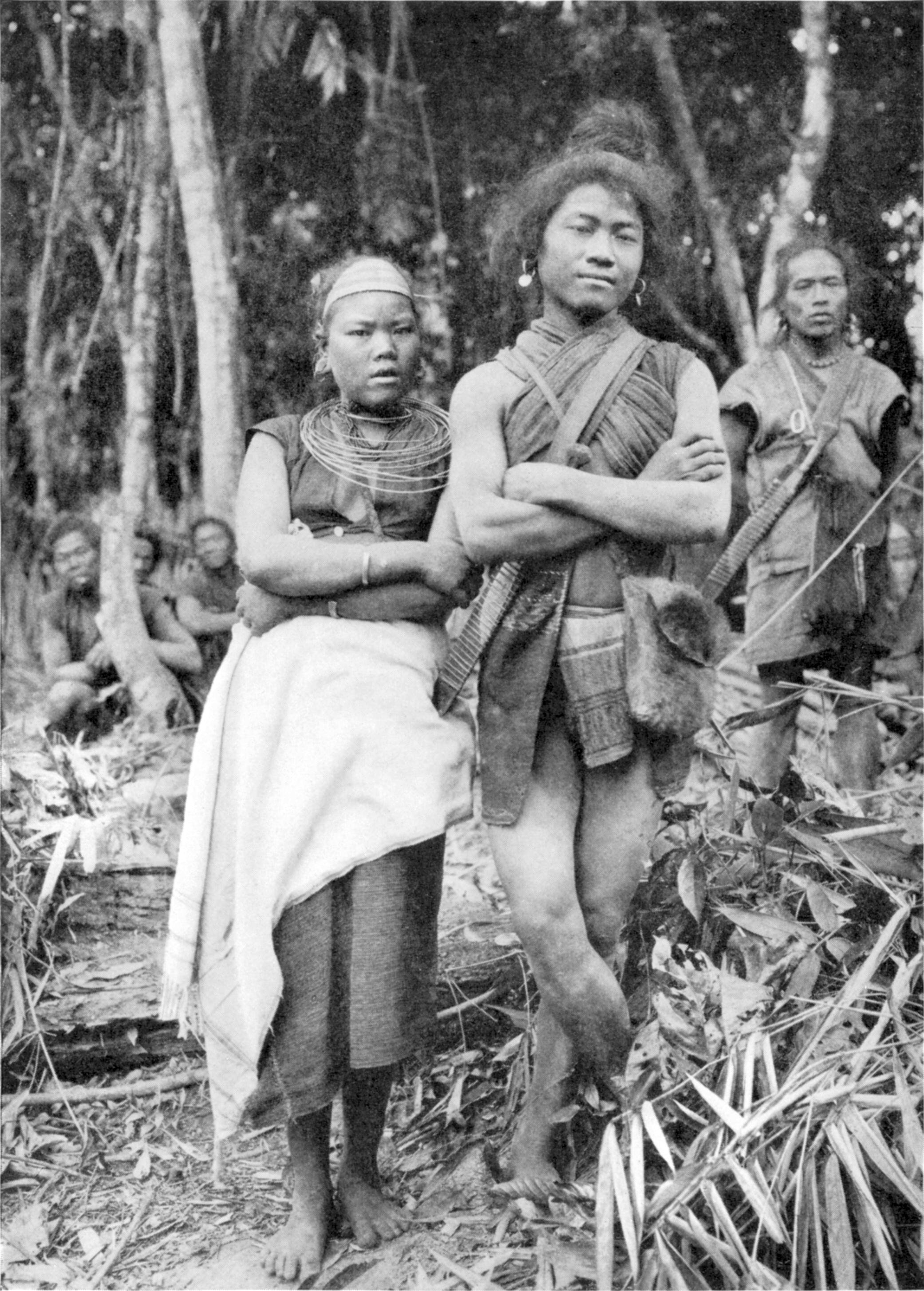
Photograph of Mishmi tribesmen taken by Joseph Rock in 1922.

After extensive preparation, Nicolas Krick set out to explore northern India in search of a route to Tibet. He started looking for carriers with a guide (Tchôking). Despite the fear of the Mishmi tribes, who had a reputation for slavery, Nicolas and Tchöking managed to recruit 17 carriers, and the expedition began on December 18, 1851. Nicolas Krick took numerous notes, taking topographical, geological, zoological and botanical measurements at every stop. On December 19, he eats monkey. On the 20th, he met the first members of the Mishmi tribe. The expedition continues to be a dangerous and difficult one, particularly as the paths taken a little further run alongside precipices in the foothills of the Himalayas.

The encounter with the first Mishmi village is very peaceful. Nicolas Krick, unable to communicate in any other way, uses his flute. He is touched by the Mishmi hospitality. The group continues on their way, despite the fact that the Mishmis and Tibetans are at war. On December 24, 1851, they arrive at the home of Khroussa, a village chief, and learn that the Mishmis are sending an ambassador to the Tibetans to end the war. Khroussa asserts that it is not possible to go any further until peace has been concluded. The carriers demand Nicolas Krick to pay what he owes them, what he is doing, and they abandon him and his luggage. He confides to his diary the discouragement that assails him, far from the euphoria of the first days: "If I hadn't been a missionary, I would have said: 'Let's go back'. In fact, that's what all my people promised themselves they'd do."

Krick, determined to continue his journey at all costs, negotiates with some Mishmis to help him transport his equipment in exchange for two cows. He arrives in a new village, where he is considered a circus animal. All the inhabitants want to see this man with white skin and blond hair: "They kept me waiting, but I held out with my pipe until eleven o'clock, when the ladies withdrew; I laughed under my cape at having caught them. I said my prayers, then undressed. But all the women came running back and threw themselves around me as if it had been an eclipse of the Sun. I had nothing better to do than wrap myself in my blanket."

On December 28, his guide Tchôking left him and Nicolas Krick stayed behind with two Mishmis. The following night, his luggage was stolen, but despite this setback, he set off again, deciding to trust in Providence. On December 30, 1851, he met three chiefs returning from Tibet. During the night of the 30th to the 31st, part of his rice was stolen, and he learned from the carriers that he was threatened with death. The further he advanced into Tibet, the more dangerous the situation became. At the beginning of 1852, he treated one of his porters for a leg injury. On January 4, he managed to scare off two individuals who were trying to attack him by firing his rifle into the air.

===== Exploring the Tibet =====
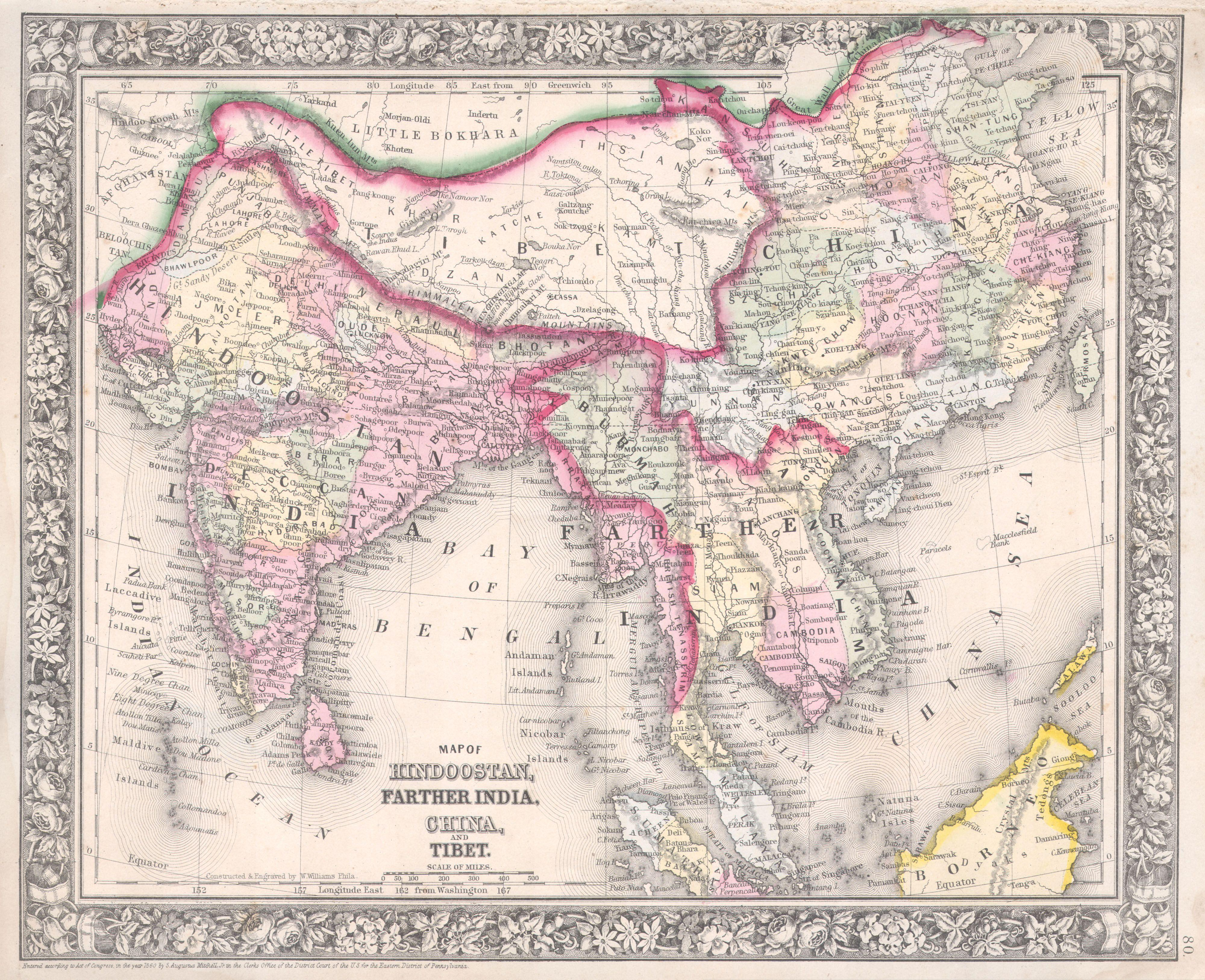
Map of India and Tibet in 1864 by geographer Samuel Augustus Mitchell.

His journey became longer and longer. On January 5, 1852, he was finally able to record his arrival in Tibet in his diary: "Here the valley widens. The mountain is covered with tall, vigorous pines. The grass has been set on fire. I feel like I'm in the Vosges mountains. In the distance I see a collection of black dots. I wonder what it is. I'm told it's a Tibetan village. I take two more steps and discover another at my feet. Tibet! Tibet!!! Tibet!!!" He undoubtedly reaches the town of Along, where the villagers come to watch him, then leave. The Mishmi carriers, having demanded their money, also leave, leaving him alone. Believing in the greater hospitality of the Lamas, he spends every last penny to reach the nearest convent, that of Sommeu. At least, that's what he calls the place he reaches, but the location of "Sommeu" is currently disputed and not identified with certainty. He is observed there like a freak: "They opened my mouth, counted my teeth, looked up my nose, counted the fingers on my hands. They thought I was an unknown being, half-man, half-animal, but a mixture of both."

The Tibetans are very welcoming: they invite Nicolas Krick to eat with them. He takes out some cutlery, which causes a sensation. A Tibetan inspector, Noboudji, comes to see him with a translator and asks if he is a soldier. After asking for more explanations, he is friendly and leaves. For a few days, Nicolas Krick observes the Tibetan rites, but avoids participating in them directly. The Tibetans ask Nicolas Krick for blessings, finally giving credence to his religious status. In his diary, he records all the observations he manages to make on his exploration of Tibet. On January 31, Inspector Noboudji returns to see Nicolas Krick and two days later asks him to leave, using the pretext of a new war, while giving him a letter to facilitate his travel.

===== Returning from Tibet =====
Map of Arunachal Pradesh bordering Tibet

Nicolas Krick leaves Tibet. He is able to eat his fill again, thanks to the rice the Tibetans have provided. Accompanied by two carriers, he arrived at the border on February 5, but during the night his carriers abandoned him. Among the Mishmis, he exchanged his blanket for the services of guides, who also abandoned him. The journey becomes even more difficult as the rainy season begins. He arrives at a Mishmi tribe whose chief wants him dead. A woman in the tribe has requested his intervention to heal her husband's foot wound, and he is allowed to stay with the tribe for a few days without the threats being carried out. But he knew he was in danger, and prepared himself for death. Nicolas Krick's treatment relieves the sick man, and he is able to negotiate his departure.

On February 19, he arrived at a new tribe, where he finally received a warm welcome from Chief. He stayed for a few days, noted his observations of religious ceremonies in his diary and rested. Tême, a Mishmi, accompanies him to the next village, giving him protection from the violence and theft of neighboring tribes. He arrives in the Khoussa tribe and is stranded there for a week due to violent storms. He took advantage of the situation to negotiate guides to accompany him to Saikhoa. Conditions on the journey were extremely difficult: travel during the rainy season and reduced rice rations forced Nicolas Krick and his porters to continue walking to avoid starvation. After several days, Nicolas Krick arrived, with the help of fishermen, at Saikhoa, where he met Captain Smith on March 18, 1852. The account of his exploration of Tibet ends with the mention of this last encounter. The journal he sent was published under the title: Relation d'un voyage au Thibet par M. l'abbé Krick.

==== Solitary mission in Tibet ====
===== Return from expedition and appointment as superior =====
On his return from Tibet, Nicolas Krick went down to Nowgong, where he arrived at Easter. He reunites with Doctor Pingault, who has built a chapel at his own expense in his absence, and with Louis Bernard. Nicolas Krick advises Bernard to settle in Nowgong and takes him on a tour of the local brotherhoods. At the same time, Krick wrote a new diary in which he recorded his observations. When he finished it on October 27, he sent it to Professor Philippe-Édouard Foucaux.

In Nowlong, he received news from the Paris Foreign Missions, who congratulated him on his exploration of Tibet and announced the arrival of Augustin Bourry, asking him to join his next expedition. Louis Bernard remained in Assam, now considered the Mission's rear base.

Nicolas Krick sets off again. He took advantage of the dry season to explore the region. He passed through Saikhoa to avoid the Mishmi tribe, and made contact with other tribes: the Soulikattas (with their hair cut off), the Abors and the Padams (the tribe with the cross-shaped tattoos). Just as he was about to leave, he received a second letter from the Paris Foreign Missions, informing him that he had been appointed superior of the Tibet mission.

This was his last solo mission, and he wrote two reports, one for the Paris Foreign Missions, the other for the doctors at Necker Hospital.

===== Mission with the Abors =====
In February 1853, he left on an expedition to join the Abor tribe. The latter were distrustful and forbade all foreigners to enter their territory. In fact, for 29 years, the English have also been forbidden to enter Tibet.

Despite his poor knowledge of the local language, he tries to demonstrate that he is not an Englishman, but a religious man (Dondaï). The Mebo village accepts him: for the locals, a cleric is first and foremost a demon-hunter, who must cure all illnesses, as these are considered to be caused by evil spirits. The Dondaïs perform exorcisms and offer sacrifices to cure illnesses. Nicolas Krick attempts to cure illnesses using the knowledge he acquired at the Necker Hospital, with the intention of proving that he is not an English spy. Not without difficulty: "Of course, I wasn't the man to cure all illnesses. When I told them I couldn't cure such and such an illness, or that I didn't have a remedy, they would get angry and accuse me of ill will. But I was obliged to give them something, even if it was just a little water, and they were happy. Basically, it wasn't difficult to work wonders. A little care and cleanliness, some cream, some purgatives, did more than all the sacrifices of dogs, chickens and pigs. I saw the moment when they would take me on their shoulders and carry me in triumph."

He was obliged to continue his work as a doctor. The prestige he gained from the cures he obtained aroused the jealousy of the Dondaïs, who accused him of witchcraft. He was expelled from the village, but the patients he had cured once again demanded his presence, allowing him to stay. Nicolas Krick wrote to the Paris Foreign Missions asking for first-aid kits, but the village fire and a tiger attack on a cow put an end to his stay: the inhabitants asked him to leave. He complied, on Good Friday, in the middle of a thunderstorm. He then wrote two reports, one for the superiors of the Paris Foreign Missions, the other for Dr. Bousquet, in which he described the habits and customs of the Abors, demonstrating a great openness of mind for the time. He concludes his report as follows: "Certainly Paris is more corrupt than Membo."

===== Illness and convalescence =====
Back at the Abors, Krick falls seriously ill. His fever is accompanied by a severe weakness or depression, and his strength diminishes. He returns to Saikhoa, hoping to see the new missionary Augustin Bourry. His health worsened and he decided to return to Nowgong in May for medical treatment. In Nowgong, a doctor in his care considers his condition hopeless. Bedridden and depressed for months, he only wrote to the superiors of the Paris Foreign Missions on September 20, 1853. He tells them of his illness: "Six months of this dreadful illness with all the violent remedies have totally exhausted me. I am but a shadow of my former self. All I have left is dry, wrinkled skin on my bones. This fever is unknown in Europe. It kills in less than 24 hours, and those who escape are demoralized and useless for several months." In his letter, he complains about the lack of directives given by the Paris Foreign Missions: the mission to Tibet is a mission in a remote country that is difficult to access, and between the missionaries and Paris, correspondence is rare and communications difficult.

In September 1853, just as he seemed to be getting better, his face began to swell. This new ordeal, and a letter he received from the Paris Foreign Missions, transformed his state of mind and his deep-seated motivations as a missionary, marked by a greater detachment, more spiritual than before. On October 15, he wrote to the directors of the Paris Foreign Missions: "God be blessed to have sent me this trial. It is more effective than all the dangers and hardships of my travels in purifying my soul... Our mission is being put to many trials at its beginning, but we must hope that one day it will blossom and give back a hundredfold. Assure the Council that we will do everything to succeed, and that we are ready to sacrifice everything, even our lives, for the glory of God." In November 1853, after several months of convalescence in Nowgong, he was finally able to leave for Saikhoa to join his two confreres who were waiting for him.

==== Mission to Lhasa ====
===== Reaching Lhasa =====
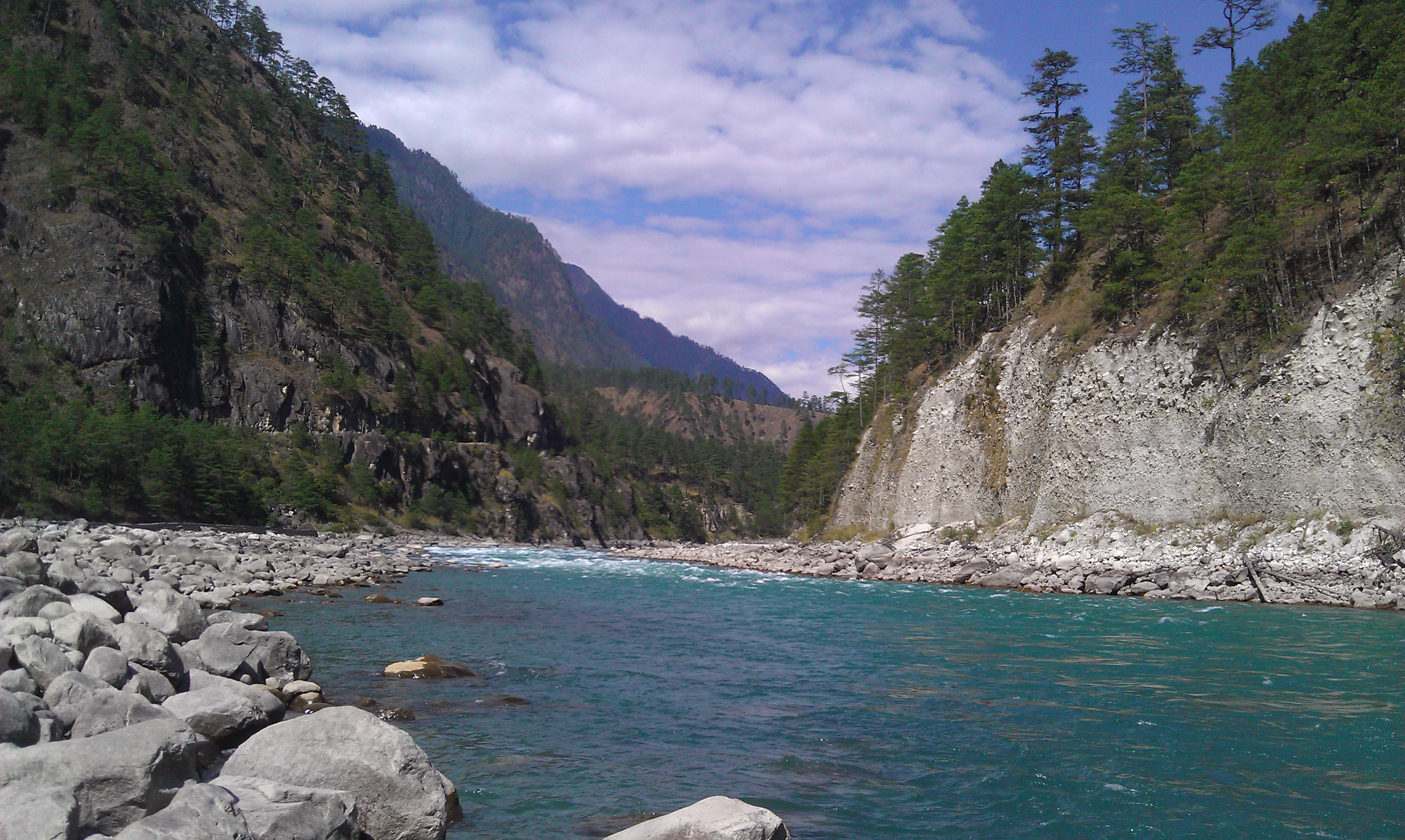
Photo of the Lohit River, Arunachal Pradesh, North India

Nicolas Krick reunited with Louis Bernard at the end of November 1853, after having been alone for almost a year. On December 10, Louis Bernard and Nicolas Krick renewed contact with Augustin Bourry on the Brahmaputra, where the latter had been waiting for them for several months. Once there, Nicolas Krick and Augustin Bourry set out to reach Tibet. The last months of the two missionaries are difficult to trace. Only five letters from Augustin Bourry provide any insight into their expedition. In one of them, dated December 25, 1853, Bourry wrote that they were looking for a guide to accompany them. Nicolas Krick, who has been intrigued by the cross-shaped tattoos of the Abors for some time, would like to pass through this tribe's territory rather than that of the Mishmis.

Both missionaries were well aware of the dangers of going to Tibet. Nicolas Krick, still ill, wrote to the superiors of the Paris Foreign Missions: "Everyone, and even the doctor this morning, tells me that I will only recover if I leave Assam for a while. But I tell them that if I leave, it will be for Tibet, not Bengal. If I die, someone else will take my place."

On February 19, after negotiations, the two missionaries set off up the Lohit, crossing the territory of the Mishmis tribes. On February 24, they realized that the route they had taken was too difficult, as the river current was too strong. They made the rest of the way on foot. Another letter dated May 10, 1854, sent from a village in the Mishmi tribe, states that the two missionaries were making little progress, threatened by the tribes they met who tried to loot their baggage. On July 25, 1854, Krick and Bourry arrived at the first Tibetan village in Oualong, severely tested by their journey. Augustin Bourry asks for medicine and complains about the harshness of their living conditions. On July 29, they arrive in Sommeu, Nicolas Krick planning to leave for Lhasa to request permission to return to Tibet. They occupy a house in the village.

===== Death of the missionaries =====
Nicolas Krick was murdered on September 1, 1854, by members of the Mishmi tribe, along with Augustin Bourry. The motive for the crime is unclear. There are several versions: the guides accompanying Nicolas Krick and Augustin Bourry claim that a tribal chief, Kaïsha, killed them when they were in their hut. Others refer to a dispute over a sheet that Nicolas Krick failed to hand over as they passed through his lands.

Once the assassination was known, the English decided to investigate and launched a punitive expedition against Chief Kaïsha. During the expedition, they recover the personal effects of Nicolas Krick and Augustin Bourry (including his flute). Kaïsha is sentenced to death, but thanks to Louis Bernard's intervention, his sentence is reduced to life imprisonment.

From the interrogations carried out, we can conclude that Nicolas Krick, who was ill, was in his hut when he was killed, and that his body was thrown into the river, not far from the scene of the crime. However, the arrest of Chief Kaïsha does not reveal the reasons for his act: theft, revenge and hostility to Catholicism are three of the motives mentioned as probable.

When they learned of the death of the two missionaries in January 1855, the directors of the Paris Foreign Missions asked the Bishop of Kolkata to do everything in his power to ensure that the British government did not retaliate against the natives or intervene politically.

The fact that the personal belongings of the two priests were found in Tibet in 1854, led Adrien Launay, priest and historian of the Paris Foreign Missions, to believe that the assassination of the two religious may have been ordered by the Tibetan authorities. Between 1852 and 1854, tensions between the English and Tibetans were high, and the latter considered Nicolas Krick and Augustin Bourry to be Englishmen. This thesis is partly challenged by Laurent Deshayes, in his book Tibet (1846 - 1952), because the Kaïsha tribal chief never mentioned Tibetans during interrogations.

== Religious posterity ==
=== Beginning of hagiography ===
Nicolas Krick's death was quickly described as that of a martyr. The posthumous chronicles modify Nicolas Krick's writings, notably this sentence: "If we are killed, it will not be a martyrdom, it will be an assassination". The clear statement that it is not a matter of martyrdom becomes a question: "If we are killed, will it be a martyrdom or an assassination?"

The directors of the Paris Foreign Missions wrote to the Archbishop of Calcutta, comparing Nicolas Krick's death to that of the Vietnamese Martyrs: "Respect for their memory, which should remind the savage tribes among whom they passed that martyrs of charity and apostolic zeal, as well as the entirely spiritual character of their undertaking, from which they endeavored on every occasion to remove even the slightest hint of political views, seem to us sufficient reasons not to desire the intervention of the British government."

A few years later, in 1862, Auguste Desgodins lobbied for the beatification of Nicolas Krick and Augustin Bourry as martyrs, but the directors of the Paris Foreign Missions were not in favor, believing that "martyrdom for the faith was not well noted."

=== Posterity among the tribes of Assam ===
The government's policy of protecting the tribes of Arunachal Pradesh meant that missionaries were forbidden to visit this part of India. It wasn't until 1978 that an Indian Salesian priest, principal Father Thomas Menamparampil, managed to visit the Mishmis at the invitation of one of the tribal chiefs. During this visit, the tribal chief and his people converted to Catholicism, thus contributing to an extraordinary expansion of Christianity in the region. On August 2, 1979, nine hundred and twenty-four members of the Noctes tribe requested baptism.

Father Thomas Menamparampil then wrote a biography of Nicolas Krick and Augustin Bourry from the bishop's archives, which helped strengthen devotion to the two missionaries, considered the founders of the Church of Arunachal Pradesh. In 1981, Thomas Menamparampil was appointed Bishop of Dibrugarh and set about organizing the evangelization of the region. In 1983, a school was opened, resulting in an increase in conversions.

Thomas Menamparampil renewed contact in 1991 with the Paris Foreign Missions, who discovered the influence of Nicolas Krick and Augustin Bourry in the region. In 1993, the first church in the region was built and inaugurated in the presence of Mother Teresa, who supported the project. The new Christians in the region requested the beatification of Nicolas Krick and Augustin Bourry, whose trial is underway. The Paris Foreign Missions rediscovered the two missionaries and encouraged the publication and distribution of Nicolas Krick's writings on the life of the first mission to Northern Tibet. The historian Françoise Fauconnet-Buzelin published a book on the South Tibet mission in 1999, and a study of Nicolas Krick's diary was published in 2001 from the archives of the Paris Foreign Missions.

=== Church recognition process ===
At the time of Nicolas Krick's death, very little had been published about his life. There is no hagiography, and research has found only his birth certificates and correspondence with ecclesiastics of the time, the region having suffered severe destruction during the Second World War.

A meticulous man, Nicolas Krick kept all his homilies, which he left to the Paris Foreign Missions before his departure for Tibet. All his homilies are preserved and published in volume 1311 of the Paris Foreign Missions archives, comprising 747 pages.

It wasn't until 1981, after some of the Mishmis had begun to convert to Christianity, that Father Thomas Menamparampil was appointed Bishop of Dibrugarh. The desire to present Nicolas Krick and Augustin Bourry as "founders" of the local Church led to them being mentioned and proposed as models. A process of beatification is underway, initiated by local bishop Thomas Menamparampil.

== Non-spiritual posterity ==
=== Nicolas Krick's Travel Diary ===
During his mission in Tibet, Nicolas Krick wrote two scientific (not religious) reports which he sent to France. These two reports proved important for our knowledge of Tibet, which was relatively incomplete at the time.

The first, in which he recounts his trip to Tibet, was written in the summer of 1852 and sent to his Tibetologist professor Philippe-Édouard Foucaux. It contains valuable historical, geographical and ethnographic information on Tibetan communities.

The second report, written in March 1853 after his trip to the Abors, was addressed to his professor of medicine at Hôpital Necker. These two reports were partially published in the Annales pour la propagation de la foi (Annals of the Propagation of the Faith), which warned from the beginning against the original or unconventional nature of the religious's writings. Nicolas Krick describes things with a sense of humor, which is relatively rare for a missionary, as missionaries are more interested in producing enlightening writings than scientific ones.

The interest shown in this work prompted the Paris Foreign Missions to publish a more complete version in 1854 under the title Relation d'un voyage au Thibet par M. l'abbé Krick. What was published was certainly more complete, but some passages were rewritten to ensure that Nicolas Krick's style and freedom of tone did not offend readers. In 1900, Adrien Launay reproduced large extracts from Nicolas Krick's reports in his history of the Tibet mission. Launay's work served as the basis for subsequent research. Extracts from Relation d'un voyage au Thibet par M. l'abbé Krick were also published in the Journal of the Asiatic Society of Bengal in 1913, enabling English ethnologists and explorers to become acquainted with Nicolas Krick's writings. Krick is one of the oldest sources of Western origin for specialists in North-East India. In 2001, the Paris Foreign Missions archives published Tibet Terre Promise. Le journal de Nicolas Krick : missionnaire et explorateur (1851-1852), by Juliette Buzelin. In 2014, an Indian novelist, Mamang Dai, published a fictionalized biography entitled The Black Hill based on Krick's letters.

=== Nicolas Krick's scientific contribution ===
Nicolas Krick had many motivations. Firstly, he wanted to evangelize the people and provide future missions with information about the country. Furthermore, there was also the pride of being the first European on the scene. Nicolas Krick's writings also reveal a fascination with the idea of exploring unknown countries and discovering landscapes that no European had ever seen. A man also eager to share his scientific knowledge "even though he was a priest." He was also patriotic. He had good relations with the British in India, but he wanted to go beyond them. His notes and diary show that much of his time as a missionary was devoted to science, through comments, map surveys and descriptions of the tribes he met.

His work as a missionary in Tibet gave him the opportunity to gather and disseminate information on a region then completely unknown to Europeans. The information contained in his reports provides a general, although incomplete, picture of the country. He was interested in geology and climate, even though he had no altimeter with which to take precise measurements.

The description of the Mishmis shows the influence of French culture on Nicolas Krick: the 19th century was marked by the desire to classify people according to "races". Nicolas Krick uses the language of the time, seeking to classify the different races present during his expeditions. However, he seems more influenced by the philosophy of Jean-Jacques Rousseau: European superiority is not linked to race, but to the ability of men to organize themselves in society. Nicolas Krick notes that the Mishmis are related to the Chinese, and is astonished by the way the Mishmi tribes behave towards each other, considering themselves to be " non-friendly."

His description of the Mishmi tribes is again imbued with the ideas of his time: he considers them savage, as they reject civilization, but at the same time admires their lack of perversion and their near-virginity. On the subject of relationships between men and women, he is astonished by the differences between these relationships and those in the West. He also describes religious practices and ceremonies in great detail.

He also describes the workings of the Tibetan government, tax collection and religious organization; he questions authors who, prior to his observations, saw Tibetan religion as a copy of Catholicism. He describes religious ceremonies and Tibetan habits and customs, little known to Westerners at the time, and analyzes Tibetans' social relationships and games...

Nicolas Krick's highly descriptive account of his exploration has made him a reference for ethnologists specializing in present-day Arunachal Pradesh: English books on the peoples of northern India quote his name and his writings translated into English. The interest of his diary is all the greater as the Mishmis have no written tradition, and Nicolas Krick's diary is therefore one of the traces of their history. In 1954, the English ethnologist Verrier Elwin paid tribute to Nicolas Krick in an article published in The Illustrated Weekly of India on November 7, 1954. It wasn't until 1979, when the Christians of Arunachal Pradesh asked for information about Nicolas Krick and his colleague Augustin Bourry, that Nicolas Krick's scientific work began to be revisited by the Paris Foreign Missions.
