= Michael Akasius Toppo =

Roman Catholic bishop

Most Reverend Michael Akasius Toppo
- Bishop of Tezpur
- Archdiocese: Guwahati
- Diocese: Tezpur
- Appointed: 3 December 2007
- Predecessor: Robert Kerketta
- Successor: Incumbent

Orders
- Ordination: 26 January 1986
- Consecration: 2 March 2008 by Pedro López Quintana

Personal details
- Born: 8 May 1955 (age 71) Gormara, Assam, India
- Denomination: Roman Catholic
- Motto: OMNIA OMNIBUS AMORIS

Bishop Michael Akasius Toppo is the current serving bishop of the Roman Catholic Diocese of Tezpur, Assam, India.

== Early life and education ==
Toppo was born on 8 May 1955 in Gormara, Assam, India. He studied at St. Paul's minor seminary, Shillong, Christ King College Shillong and St. Albert's College Ranchi.

== Priesthood ==
On 26 January 1986 Toppo was ordained a priest.

== Episcopate ==
Toppo was appointed Bishop of Tezpur, India by Pope Benedict XVI on 3 December 2007 and consecrated by Pedro López Quintana on 2 March 2008.

== See also ==
List of Catholic bishops of India
