= Diocese of Diphu =

Roman Catholic diocese in Assam, India

Coordinates: 25.8604°N 93.4407°E

Diocese of Diphu Dioecesis Diphuensis दिफू के सूबा

Location
- Country: India
- Ecclesiastical province: Guwahati
- Metropolitan: Guwahati

Statistics
- Area: 15,222 km^{2} (5,877 sq mi)
- Population: Total; Catholics: (as of 2019); 1,259,000; 66,700 (5.3%)
- Parishes: 28

Information
- Rite: Roman Rite
- Cathedral: Cathedral of the Risen Christ in Diphu

Current leadership
- Pope: Leo XIV
- Bishop: Paul Mattekatt
- Metropolitan Archbishop: John Moolachira

Website
- Website of the Diocese

The Roman Catholic Diocese of Diphu (Latin: Diphuen(sis)) is a diocese located in the city of Diphu in the ecclesiastical province of Guwahati in India.

== History ==
- 5 December 1983: Established as Diocese of Diphu from the Metropolitan Archdiocese of Shillong–Gauhati. The foundation stone was blessed by Pope John Paul 2 during his pastoral visit to Shillong.

== Leadership ==
Bishops of Diphu (Latin Rite)
Year		Bishop
From	to	Bishop
14 February 2007	9 April 2011	Bishop John Moolachira
12 March 2006	14 February 2007	Bishop John Thomas Kattrukudiyil (Apostolic Administrator )
(10 June 1994	7 December 2005	Bishop John Thomas Kattrukudiyil
5 December 1983	4 March 1992	Bishop Mathai Kochuparampil, S.D.B.
