= Diocese of Bongaigaon =

Roman Catholic diocese in Assam, India

Coordinates: 26.5017°N 90.5586°E

Diocese of Bongaigaon Dioecesis Bongaigaonensis बोंगईगांव के सूबा

Location
- Country: India
- Territory: Bongaigaon, Barpeta, Baksa, Chirang, Dhubri, Kokrajhar and Nalbari
- Ecclesiastical province: Guwahati
- Metropolitan: Guwahati

Statistics
- Area: 13,630 km^{2} (5,260 sq mi)
- Population: Total; Catholics: (as of 2012); 5,497,000; 62,908 (1.1%)
- Parishes: 29

Information
- Rite: Latin Rite
- Cathedral: Christ, Light of the World Cathedral in Bongaigaon
- Patron saint: Christ Light of the World

Current leadership
- Pope: Leo XIV
- Bishop: Thomas Pulloppillil
- Metropolitan Archbishop: John Moolachira

Website
- Website of the Diocese

The Roman Catholic Diocese of Bongaigaon (Latin: Bongaigaonen(sis)) is a diocese located in the city of Bongaigaon in the ecclesiastical province of Guwahati in India.

== History ==
- 10 May 2000: Established as Diocese of Bongaigaon from the Metropolitan Archdiocese of Guwahati

== Leadership ==
- Bishops of Bongaigaon (Latin Rite)
  - Bishop Thomas Pulloppillil (10 May 2000 – present)
