= Robert Kerketta =

Indian Roman Catholic bishop (1932–2018)

Robert Kerketta S.D.B.
- Bishop of Tezpur
- Church: Catholic Church
- Diocese: Diocese of Tezpur
- In office: 24 October 1980 – 3 December 2007
- Predecessor: Joseph Mittathany
- Successor: Michael Akasius Toppo
- Previous post: Bishop of Dibrugarh (1970-1980)

Orders
- Ordination: 11 February 1963
- Consecration: 18 October 1970 by Hubert D’Rosario

Personal details
- Born: 22 October 1932 Kacharigaon (near Tezpur), Assam Province, British Raj, British Empire
- Died: 22 December 2018 (aged 86) Tezpur, Assam, India

Robert Kerketta S.D.B. (22 October 1932 – 22 December 2018) was an Indian Roman Catholic bishop.

== Biography ==
Kerketta was born in India and was ordained to the priesthood in 1963. He served as bishop of the Roman Catholic Diocese of Dibrugarh, India, from 1970 to 1980 and as bishop of the Roman Catholic Diocese of Tezpur, India, from 1980 to 2007. Kerketta had also served as the rector of Krishnanagar Seminary in West Bengal.

Kerketta died on 22 December 2018 at the Baptist Mission Hospital. Kerketta is buried at the Priest's Cemetery in Bishop's House, Tezpur.
