= Joseph Mittathany =

Roman Catholic prelate (1931–2022)

His Excellency Joseph Mittathany
- Archbishop Emeritus of Imphal
- Installed: 10 July 1995
- Term ended: 12 July 2006
- Successor: Dominic Lumon
- Other post: Bishop of Imphal (1980–1995)
- Previous post: Bishop of Tezpur (1969–1980)

Orders
- Ordination: 23 April 1959
- Consecration: 27 September 1969 by Stephen Ferrando

Personal details
- Born: 12 July 1931 Kalikavu, Madras Presidency, British India
- Died: 11 July 2022 (aged 90) Koirengei, Manipur, India

Joseph Mittathany (12 July 1931 – 11 July 2022) was an Indian Roman Catholic prelate.

Mittathany was born in Kalikave and was ordained to the priesthood in 1959. He served as the bishop of the Roman Catholic Diocese of Tezpur, India, from 1969 to 1980 and then served as bishop and then archbishop of the Roman Catholic Archdiocese of Imphal, India, from 1980 until his retirement in 2006.

Catholic Church titles
Preceded by Post created	Archbishop of Imphal; 1995–2006	Succeeded by Dominic Lumon
Preceded by Post created	Bishop of Imphal; 1980–1995	Succeeded by Post abolished
Preceded by Orestes Marengo	Bishop of Tezpur; 1969–1980	Succeeded by Robert Kerketta
