= Roman Catholic Archdiocese of Imphal =

Roman Catholic archdiocese in Manipur, India

Coordinates: 24°49′N 93°57′E

Archdiocese of Imphal Archidioecesis Imphalensis
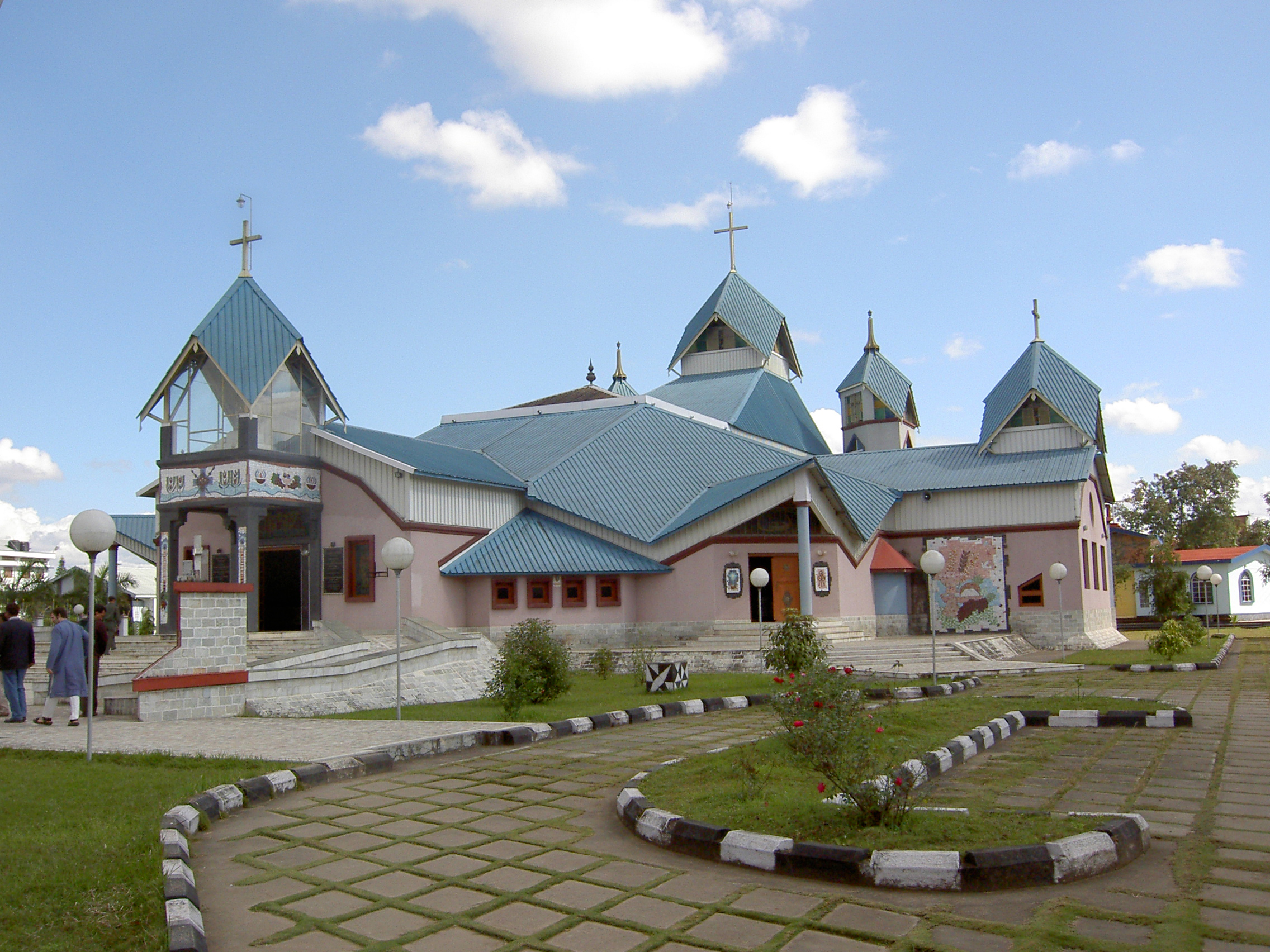
- St Joseph's Cathedral in Imphal

Location
- Country: India

Information
- Rite: Latin Rite

Current leadership
- Pope: Leo XIV
- Metropolitan Archbishop: Linus Neli

Website
- www.dioceseimphal.org/en

The Roman Catholic Archdiocese of Imphal (Latin: Imphalen(sis)) is an archdiocese located in the city of Imphal in India.

== History ==
- 29 January 1973: Established as Diocese of Kohima–Imphal from the Diocese of Dibrugarh
- 28 March 1980: Established as Diocese of Imphal from the Diocese of Kohima–Imphal
- 10 July 1995: Promoted as Metropolitan Archdiocese of Imphal

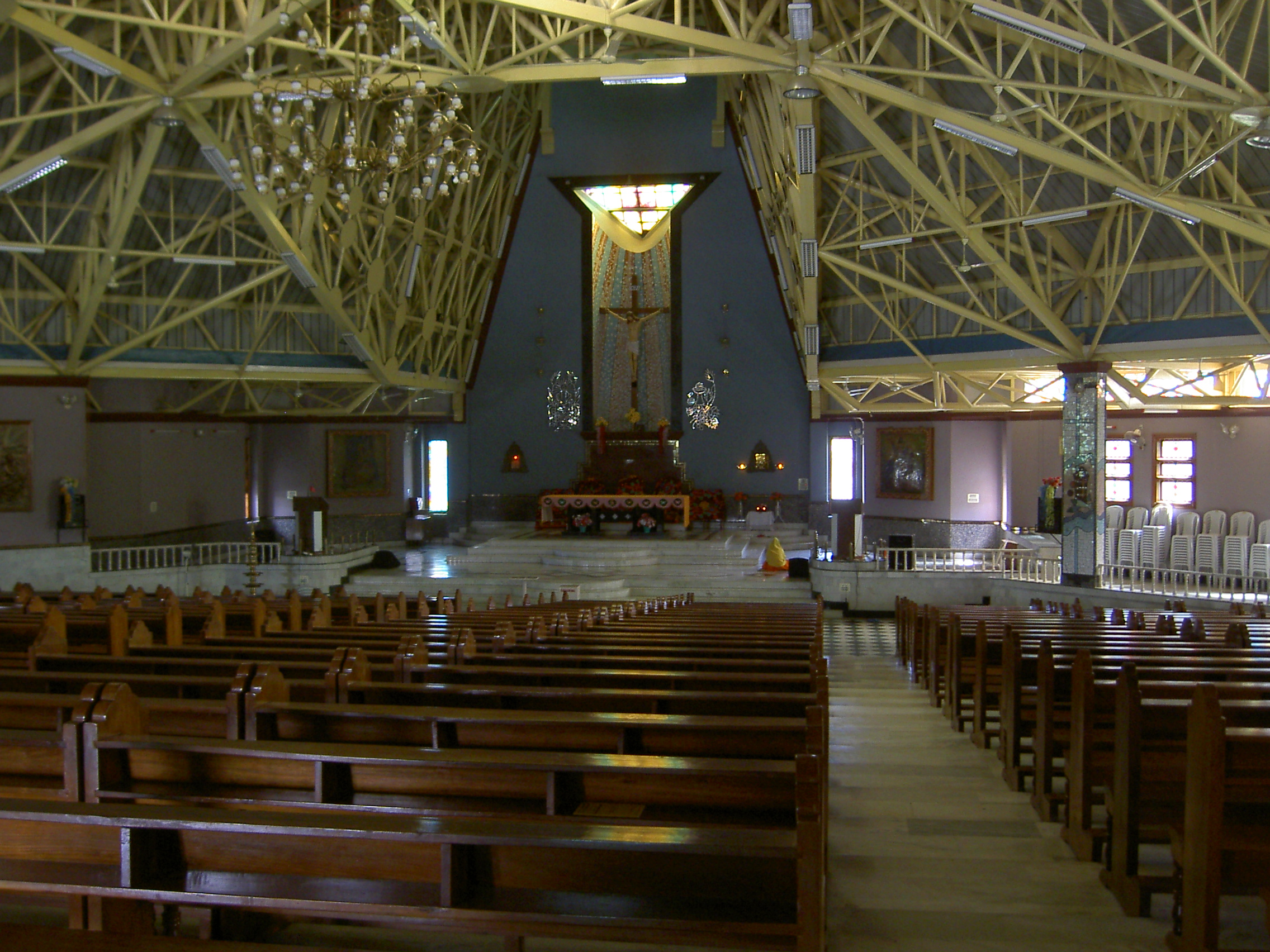
Interior of St. Joseph's Cathedral in Imphal

== Leadership ==
- Archbishops of Imphal (Latin Rite)
  - Archbishop Linus Neli ( 7 October 2023 - Present )
  - Archbishop Dominic Lumon (12 July 2006 – 7 October 2023)
  - Archbishop Joseph Mittathany (10 July 1995 – 12 July 2006)
- Bishops of Imphal (Latin Rite)
  - Bishop Joseph Mittathany (later Archbishop) (28 March 1980 – 10 July 1995)

== Suffragan dioceses ==
- Kohima
