= Linus Neli =

Indian catholic archbishops

The Most Reverend Linus Neli
- Archbishop of Imphal
- Archdiocese: Roman Catholic Archdiocese of Imphal
- See: Roman Catholic Archdiocese of Imphal
- Appointed: 7 October 2023
- Predecessor: Dominic Lumon
- Successor: Incumbent

Orders
- Ordination: 20 December 1984
- Consecration: 8 December 2023 by Dominic Lumon

Personal details
- Born: 26 April 1957 (age 69) Senapati, Manipur, India
- Education: Papal Seminary; Pontifical Urban University
- Motto: "Ipsum Audite" (Listen to him)

Archbishop Linus Neli is the third Archbishop of the Roman Catholic Archdiocese of Imphal. He was appointed by Pope Francis on 7 October 2023.

== Early life and education ==
Linus was born on 26 April 1957 in Senapati, Manipur. He studied philosophy at Christ the King College, Shillong, and theology from Papal Seminary, Pune. He holds a doctorate in canon law from the Pontifical Urbaniana University of Rome.

== Priesthood and pastoral assignments ==
Bishop Neli was ordained a priest on 20 December 1984, for the Archdiocese of Imphal. He has held several academic, pastoral, administrative, and judicial responsibilities within the Church over the course of his priestly ministry.

His appointments include:

- Dean of Studies at the Minor Seminary of Imphal (1985–1986)
- Secretary to the Archbishop of Imphal (1986–1988)
- Assistant Parish Priest of Sacred Heart Parish, Hundung (1988–1989)
- Chancellor and Judicial Vicar of the Diocese of Imphal (1994–1998)
- Principal of the Sacred Heart Institute, Hundung (1998–2004)
- Associate Director at St. John’s Medical College Hospital, Bangalore (2004–2007)
- Vicar General of the Diocese of Imphal (2007–2010)
- Parish Priest of Mary Help of Christians Parish, Ukhrul (2010–2013)
- National Director of Caritas India (2013–2014)
- Rector of Oriens Theological College, Shillong (2014–2017)
- Parish Priest and Principal of the San Pietro Institute, Monsang Pantha (2016–2019)
- Director of the Archdiocesan Retreat Centre and Judicial Vicar of the Metropolitan Tribunal of Imphal (2019– October 2023)

== Episcopate ==
On 7 October 2023, Pope Francis accepted the resignation of Dominic Lumon and appointed Linus Neli as the new archbishop of the Roman Catholic Archdiocese of Imphal. He was Ordained Archbishop on 8 December 2023 by Dominic Lumon.

== Coat of Arms ==
Coat of Arms was modified and redesigned by Bro. Kendrick Ivan of Philippines.
