= Diocese of Tezpur =

Roman Catholic diocese in Assam, India

Coordinates: 26.6167°N 92.7958°E

Diocese of Tezpur Dioecesis Tezpurensis

Location
- Country: India
- Ecclesiastical province: Guwahati
- Metropolitan: Guwahati

Statistics
- Area: 38,700 km^{2} (14,900 sq mi)
- Population: Total; Catholics: (as of 2018); 8,915,700; 199,600 (4%)
- Parishes: 33

Information
- Denomination: Catholic
- Sui iuris church: Latin Church
- Rite: Roman Rite
- Established: 16 January 1964
- Cathedral: Cathedral of St John Bosco in Tezpur

Current leadership
- Pope: Leo XIV
- Bishop: Michael Akasius Toppo
- Metropolitan Archbishop: John Moolachira

Diocese of Tezpur is a Roman Catholic diocese that has its seat in Tezpur, which is in Assam, India. It was founded in 1964.

== Bishops of Tezpur ==
- Oreste Marengo, S.D.B. (6 Jul 1964 Appointed – 26 Jun 1969 Resigned)
- Joseph Mittathany (26 Jun 1969 Appointed – 28 Mar 1980 Appointed, Bishop of Imphal)
- Robert Kerketta, S.D.B. (24 Oct 1980 Appointed – 3 Dec 2007 Retired)
- Michael Akasius Toppo (3 Dec 2007 Appointed – )
