= James Thoppil =

Serving Bishop of the Roman Catholic Diocese of Kohima

Most Reverend James Thoppil
- Bishop of Kohima
- See: Kohima
- Appointed: 16 June 2011
- Predecessor: Jose Mukala
- Successor: Incumbent
- Previous posts: Dean of Studies, Good Shepherd Seminary, Dimapur; Pastor and Headmaster, Holy Cross Church, Dimapur; Secretary of the Nagaland Association of Catholic Schools; Professor, Chancellor and Dean of Studies, Oriens Theological College, Shillong; Diocesan Secretary Priests' Forum for Theological Reflection; Rector at Oriens Theological College, Shillong

Orders
- Ordination: 12 January 1982
- Consecration: 8 September 2011 by Salvatore Pennacchio

Personal details
- Born: 8 May 1959 (age 67) Kottayam, Kerala, India
- Denomination: Roman Catholic
- Residence: Bishop's House, Kohima, Nagaland, 797 001 India
- Education: Pontifical Urban University; Salesian Pontifical University
- Motto: "to do everything for the sake of the Gospel"

Bishop James Thoppil is the serving Bishop of the Roman Catholic Diocese of Kohima.

== Early life and education ==
James Thoppil was born on 8 May 1959 in Kottayam, Kerala, India to Mr. Uthuppan Charalel and Mrs. Anna. He completed his minor seminary from Minor Seminary of St. Joseph, Dibrugarh in 1977. He completed his studies in Philosophy from Christ King College in 1980. He then completed his Theological studies in 1985 from Oriens Theological College and the Sacred Heart Theological College. He completed his training from Parish of St. Joseph in Tseminyu, Nagaland in 1982. He did his minor seminary studies from St. Joseph's Seminary, Dibrugarh. He did his Philosophical Studies at Christ King College, Shillong while at the same time doing B.A at St. Anthony's College, Shillong. He did Regency at St. Joseph's Church, Tseminyu from 1980 to 1982. He completed the Theological studies (B. Th) at Sacred Heart Theological College, Shillong, under the Salesian Pontifical University, Rome, from 1982 to 1986. He did his licentiate in the Field of Dogmatic Theology under Pontifical Urban University, Rome, from 1994 to 1996 and completed his Doctorate in the same field and under the same university from 1996 to 1998. His doctoral dissertation is titled Towards an Asian Ecclesiology.

== Priesthood ==
Thoppil was ordained a priest on 12 January 1982 in Kohima.

== Episcopate ==
He was appointed bishop of the Diocese of Kohima on 16 June 2011 by Pope Benedict XVI. He was ordained a bishop on 8 September 2011 by Salvatore Pennacchio.

== Writings ==
- Towards an Asian ecclesiology: understanding of the church in the documents of the Federation of Asian Bishops' Conferences (FABC) 1970-1995 and the Asian Ecclesiological Trends
