= Dominic Lumon =

The Most Reverend Dominic Lumon
- Archbishop Emeritus of Imphal
- Archdiocese: Roman Catholic Archdiocese of Imphal
- See: Roman Catholic Archdiocese of Imphal
- Appointed: 18 January 2002
- Installed: 12 July 2006
- Term ended: 7 October 2023
- Predecessor: Joseph Mittathany
- Successor: Linus Neli
- Other post: Chairman of Family Commission in North Eastern Regional Bishop Council
- Previous post: Vicar General of Roman Catholic Archdiocese of Imphal

Orders
- Ordination: 8 February 1977
- Consecration: 7 April 2002 by Archbishop Joseph Mittathany

Personal details
- Born: 1 June 1948 (age 78) Imphal, Manipur, India
- Motto: UT UNUM SINT

Styles of Dominic Lumon
- Reference style: The Most Reverend
- Spoken style: Your Excellency
- Religious style: Archbishop

Archbishop Dominic Lumon was the Roman Catholic Archbishop of Imphal. He retired on 7 October 2023.

== Early life ==
Lumon was born on 1 June 1948 in Imphal, Manipur, India.

== Priesthood ==
Lumon was Ordained a Catholic Priest on 8 February 1977.

== Episcopate ==
Bishop Lumon was created Coadjutor archbishop of Imphal on 18 January 2002 and consecrated a bishop by Archbishop Joseph Mittathany on 7 April 2002. He succeeded as the metropolitan archbishop on 12 July 2006. He retired at the age of 75 on 7 October 2023.
