= Augustin Schoeffler =

French Roman Catholic saint

Saint Augustin Schoeffler MEP
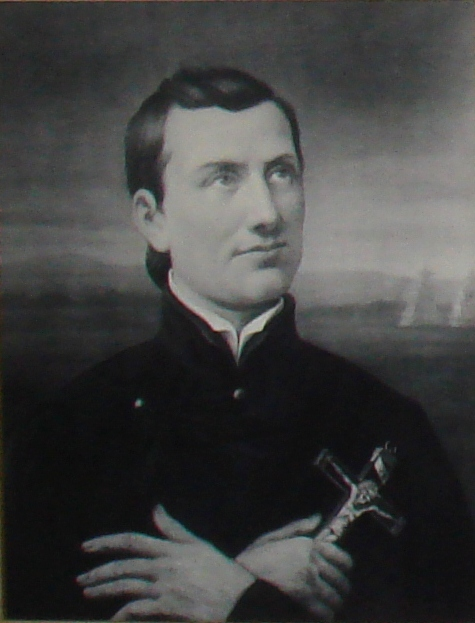

Martyr
- Born: 22 November 1822; Mittelbronn, Kingdom of France
- Died: 1 May 1851 (aged 28); Sơn Tây, Đại Nam
- Venerated in: Catholic Church
- Beatified: 7 May 1900 by Pope Leo XIII
- Canonized: 19 June 1988, Vatican City by Pope John Paul II
- Major shrine: Mittelbronn, France
- Feast: 24 November (General Roman Calendar); 1 May (Roman Martyrology); 2 May (France)
- Patronage: Metz Seminary

Augustin Schoeffler (22 November 1822–1 May 1851) was a French saint and martyr in the Catholic Church and a member of the Paris Foreign Missions Society. He was a priest in Lorraine who joined the Foreign Missions of Paris. He worked as a missionary to Indochina and was one of two French missionaries killed in northern Vietnam between 1847 and 1851.

Pope John Paul II canonized him on 19 June 1988, and he is venerated as one of the 117 Vietnamese Martyrs on 24 November. His feast day is 1 May (2 May locally in France).

== Early life and education ==
Augustin Schoeffler was born on the 22 November 1822, in Mittelbronn, France. He was baptized the next day. From 1834 to 1842 he studied at the minor seminary of Pont-à-Mousson and the college of Phalsbourg. From 1842 to 1846 Schoeffler studied Philosophy at the major seminary of Nancy. On the 5 October 1846, he began training in the Seminary of Foreign Missions of Paris. On 29 May 1847, Augustin Schoeffler was ordained a priest in Paris.

== Missionary life ==
On 18 November 1847, Father Schoeffler left Antwerp arriving in Tonkin on 6 July 1848. From 1848 to 1851 he worked as missionary while learning the Vietnamese language. In the spring of 1850 his bishop gave him the task of evangelizing Son Tay in the north. Schoeffler was arrested on 1 March 1851, and on 5 March found guilty of proselytising. He was beheaded on 1 May 1851, at Son Tay.

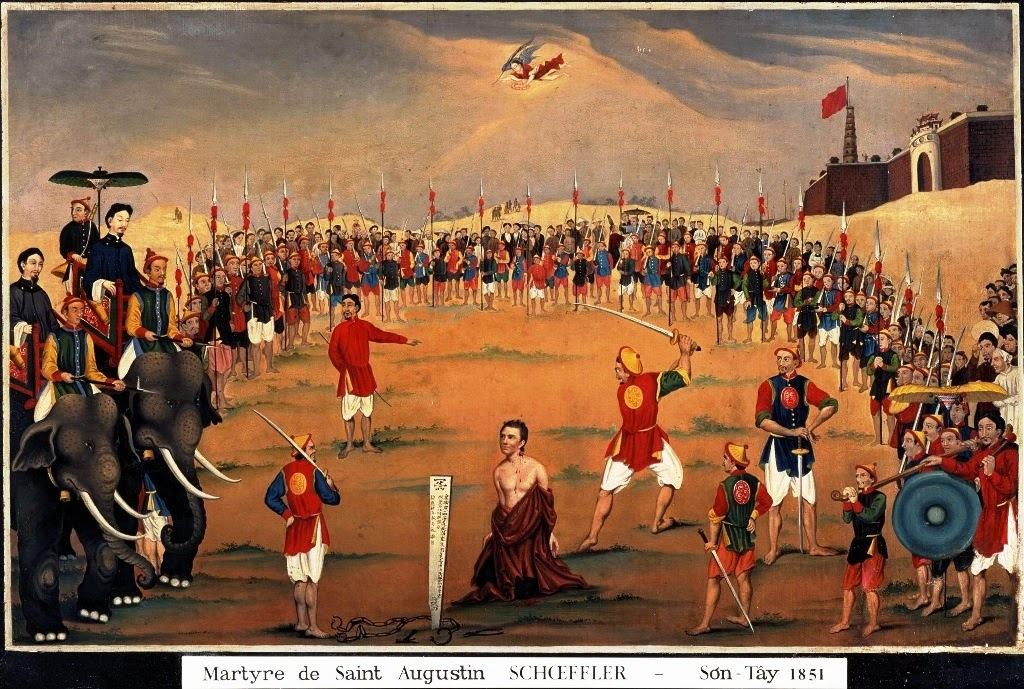
Martyrdom of St Augustin Schoeffler.

As Father Schoeffler walked to his place of execution, a placard, which read, "He preached truly the whole charge of preaching the religion of Jesus. His crime is patent. Let Mr. Augustin be beheaded, and cast into a stream." was carried before him. Augustin Schoeffler's head was thrown into the Red River, and was never recovered. The crowd rushed to collect relics. Some even uprooted the grass that was stained with his blood. His body was buried on the site of his execution. Two days later, local Christians exhumed the body and reburied it in a Christian village nearby.

== Veneration ==
On 24 September 1857, Augustin Schoeffler was declared Venerable by Pope Pius IX. He was beatified by Pope Leo XIII on 7 May 1900. He was made a saint by Pope John Paul II on 19 June 1988.

The Rue St Augustin Schoeffler is located in Mittelbronn.

== Relics ==
As of 10 May 2009, a relic of Augustin Schoeffler can be found at the Assumption Grotto Church in Detroit, Michigan. Descendants of Schoeffler's family live in the area and attend the church.
