= Thomas Menamparampil =

Roman Catholic archbishop

The Most Reverend Thomas Menamparampil
- Archbishop Emeritus of Guwahati
- Church: Roman Catholic Church
- Archdiocese: Guwahati
- Appointed: 10 July 1995 (As Archbishop of Guwahati)
- In office: 1995-2012 (As Archbishop of Guwahati)
- Successor: John Moolachira
- Previous posts: Bishop of Dibrugarh (1981-1992); Apostolic Administrator of Jowai(2014-2016)

Orders
- Ordination: 2 May 1965
- Consecration: 29 November 1981 by Hubert D’Rosario

Personal details
- Born: 22 October 1936 (age 89)
- Denomination: Roman Catholic
- Motto: AT YOUR WORD I WILL LET DOWN THE NET

Thomas Menamparampil SDB (born 22 October 1936 in Pala, Kerala India) is the retired archbishop of Guwahati. He served as the bishop of Dibrugarh for 11 years and the Archbishop of Guwahati for 20 years before his retirement on 18 January 2012. He served as the apostolic administrator of Diocese of Jowai appointed by Pope Francis from 3 February 2014 to 15 October 2016.

== Personal life ==
Menamparampil entered the Congregation of the Salesians of Don Bosco and made his first religious profession on 24 May 1955.

== Prelate ==
He received the sacrament of the priesthood by Bishop Stephen Ferrando SDB on 2 May 1965 after studying philosophy and Catholic theology. From 1969 to 1970, he completed a master's degree in history and English. From 1972 to 1974 he was the vice-provincial in Guwahati.

From 1975 to 1981 he was the Rector of Don Bosco Technical School, Shillong. On 19 June 1981 he was appointed by Pope John Paul II as Bishop of the Diocese of Dibrugarh. He was consecrated by Archbishop Hubert D'Rosario on 29 November of that year. On 30 March 1992, he became Bishop of the newly established Diocese of Guwahati in India and was elevated to Archbishop on 10 July 1995 and he was appointed as the Archbishop and Metropolitan of the same ecclesiastical province.

From 1986 to 1992 Menamparampil was the chairman of the Federation of Asian Bishops' Conferences office of Evangelization. During this time, he worked primarily on deepening the relationship with different Asian cultures through evangelism and organizing a meeting between the representatives of the Church and representatives of the Communist governments. Menamparampil was later Special Secretary for the Asian Synod (1998), the author of over 180 articles on various subjects such as evangelism, culture, ministry, education, religious life and prayer.

In 2006, he was elected Chair of the Regional Bishops' Conference of Northeast India. In 2008, he was elected Chair of the CBCI commission for Education and Culture. Menamparampil acted as mediator in the conflict between the various ethnic groups in the Union State of Assam and coordinates the "Joint Ecumenical Peace Team", which is committed to dialogue in Northeast India and has been proven an effective organisation at resolving local conflicts.

Archbishop Manamparampil was nominated for the Nobel Peace Prize in 2011. His nomination recognized his continued commitment to have peace, reconciliation and stability in Northeast India, an area full of territorial and ethnic conflicts.

== Retirement ==
On 18 January 2012, Pope Benedict XVI accepted his retirement. He was succeeded by Coadjutor Archbishop John Moolachira on the same day as Archbishop.

On 3 February 2014, Pope Francis appointed the Archbishop as Apostolic Administrator of Diocese of Jowai since the diocese was sede vacante. His term as apostolic administrator ended with the appointment of Bishop Victor Lyngdoh as the bishop of Jowai on 15 October 2016.

== Writings ==
Cultures in the Context of Sharing the Gospel

Thoughts on Evangelization

CAMINO DE FE Y DE ESPERANZA: Via Crucis con el Papa Benedicto XVI
