= Diocese of Dibrugarh =

Roman Catholic diocese in Assam, India

Coordinates: 27.4793°N 94.9206°E

Diocese of Dibrugarh Dioecesis Dibrugarhensis
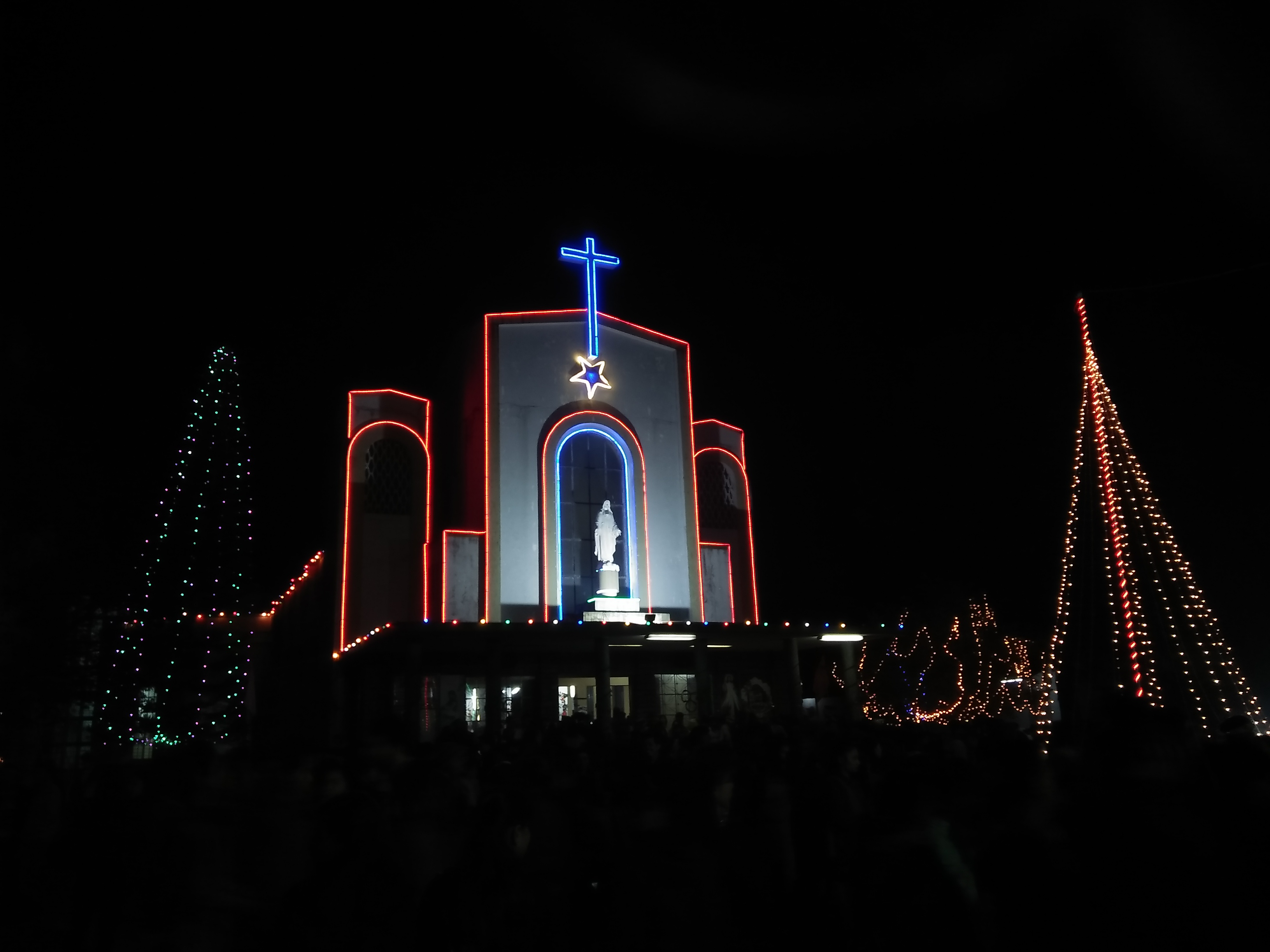
- Cathedral of the Sacred Heart, Dibrugarh during Christmas, 2019

Location
- Country: India
- Ecclesiastical province: Guwahati
- Metropolitan: Guwahati
- Headquarters: Dibrugarh, Assam, India

Statistics
- Area: 26,194 km^{2} (10,114 sq mi)
- Population: Total; Catholics: (as of 2023); 7,376,000; 135,903 (1.8%)
- Parishes: 38

Information
- Denomination: Catholic Church
- Sui iuris church: Latin Church
- Rite: Roman Rite
- Established: 12 July 1951; 75 years ago
- Cathedral: Cathedral of the Sacred Heart in Dibrugarh
- Patron saint: Sacred Heart of Jesus
- Secular priests: 152 (82 Diocesan, 70 Religious Orders)

Current leadership
- Pope: Leo XIV
- Bishop: Sede vacante
- Metropolitan Archbishop: John Moolachira
- Bishops emeritus: Joseph Aind, S.D.B.

Website
- Website of the Diocese

The Roman Catholic Diocese of Dibrugarh (Latin: Dibrugarhen(sis)) is a diocese located in the city of Dibrugarh in the ecclesiastical province of Guwahati in India.

== History ==
- 12 July 1951: Established as Diocese of Dibrugarh from the Diocese of Shillong

== Leadership ==
=== Bishops of Dibrugarh ===
- Oreste Marengo, S.D.B. (12 July 1951 – 6 July 1964), appointed Bishop of Tezpur
- Hubert D’Rosario, S.D.B. (6 July 1964 – 26 June 1969), appointed Archbishop of Gauhati–Shillong
  - Apostolic Administrator Hubert D’Rosario, S.D.B. (13 August 1969 – 18 October 1970), Archbishop of Gauhati–Shillong
- Robert Kerketta, S.D.B. (21 May 1970 – 24 October 1980), appointed Bishop of Tezpur
- Thomas Menamparampil, S.D.B. (19 June 1981 – 30 March 1992), appointed Bishop of Guwahati
- Joseph Aind, S.D.B. (11 November 1994 – 15 February 2021), retired
- Albert Hemrom (15 February 2021 – 16 July 2026), appointed Coadjutor Archbishop of Guwahati

=== Coadjutor bishop ===
- Albert Hemrom (2018-2021), succeeded
