= John Moolachira =

Indian spiritual archbishop of Guwahati

The Most Reverend John Moolachira
- Archbishop of Guwahati
- Archdiocese: Roman Catholic Archdiocese of Guwahati
- See: Roman Catholic Archdiocese of Guwahati
- Appointed: 9 April 2011 by Pope Benedict XVI
- Installed: 18 January 2012
- Predecessor: Thomas Menamparampil SDB
- Successor: Incumbent
- Previous post: Coadjutor Archbishop Roman Catholic Archdiocese of Guwahati

Orders
- Ordination: 23 October 1978
- Consecration: 15 April 2007 by Thomas Menamparampil SDB

Personal details
- Born: 14 December 1951 (age 74) Puthussery Kadavu, Kerala, India
- Residence: Archbishop's House, G.N.B Road, Ambari Guwahati 781 001, Assam, India
- Motto: THY KINGDOM COME

Styles of John Moolachira
- Reference style: The Most Reverend
- Spoken style: Your Excellency
- Religious style: Monsignor
- Posthumous style: not applicable

John Moolachira is the current serving Archbishop of Guwahati.

== Early life ==
He was born in Puthussery Kadavu, Kerala on 14 December 1951.

== Priesthood ==
He was ordained a Catholic Priest for the Roman Catholic Diocese of Tezpur on 23 October 1978.

== Episcopate ==
He was appointed Bishop of Diphu on 14 February 2007 by Pope John Paul II and ordained a bishop on 15 April 2007. He was appointed Coadjutor Archbishop of Guwahati on 9 April 2011. He succeeded as Archbishop of Guwahati on 18 January 2012.
