= Archdiocese of Guwahati =

Latin Catholic territory in India

Coordinates: 26.1853°N 91.7464°E

Archdiocese of Guwahati Archidioecesis Guvahatina

Location
- Country: India
- Ecclesiastical province: Guwahati

Statistics
- Area: 17,551 km^{2} (6,776 sq mi)
- Population: Total; Catholics: (as of 2006); 6,669,000; 53,946 (1%)
- Parishes: 44

Information
- Denomination: Catholic Church
- Sui iuris church: Latin Church
- Rite: Roman Rite
- Cathedral: Christ the Bearer of Good News Cathedral, Dispur
- Co-cathedral: St. Joseph's Co-Cathedral, Guwahati

Current leadership
- Pope: Leo XIV
- Metropolitan Archbishop: John Moolachira
- Bishops emeritus: Thomas Menamparampil Archbishop Emeritus (1995-2012)

Website
- archdioceseguwahati.org

The Archdiocese of Guwahati (Latin: Guvahatin(a)) is a Latin Church ecclesiastical territory or archdiocese of the Catholic Church located in the city of Guwahati in India. The archdiocese is a metropolitan see with six suffragan dioceses in its ecclesiastical province.

== History ==
- 30 March 1992: Established as Diocese of Guwahati from the Metropolitan Archdiocese of Shillong–Gauhati, Diocese of Tezpur and Diocese of Tura
- 10 July 1995: Promoted as Metropolitan Archdiocese of Guwahati

== Leadership ==
- Archbishops of Guwahati
  - Archbishop John Moolachira (18 January 2012–present)
  - Archbishop Thomas Menamparampil, S.D.B. (10 July 1995 – 18 January 2012)
- Bishops of Guwahati
  - Bishop Thomas Menamparampil, S.D.B. (later Archbishop) (30 March 1992 – 10 July 1995)

== Suffragan dioceses ==
- Bongaigaon
- Dibrugarh
- Diphu
- Itanagar
- Miao
- Tezpur

== Sources ==
- GCatholic.org
- Catholic Hierarchy
