= List of Catholic churches in India =

This is a list of Catholic churches in India.

== Cathedrals ==
See: List of cathedrals in India (Roman Catholic)

== Basilicas ==
See: List of basilicas in India

== Churches ==
The list of churches in this article contains churches from Catholic denominations. The information below is verifiable.

- Gloria Church, Mumbai
- St. Thomas Church, Palayoor
- Holy Family Catholic Church
- St. Joseph's Catholic Church - Baramulla
- St. Luke's Church - New Delhi
- St Andrew's Church - Kovilthottam
- St. Thomas Church - Kolkata
- St. George Syro-Malabar Catholic Forane Church, Edappally
- Holy Cross Church, Kurla
- Church of Our Lady of Mount Carmel, Bandra
- St. Michael's Church, Mumbai
- St. Andrew's Church, Mumbai
- St. Mary's Church, Noida
- Akbar's Church, Agra
- Marth Mariam Syro-Malabar Catholic Forane Church, Arakuzha
- St. Theresa of Lisieux Catholic Church, Vellayambalam
- St. Lazarus' Church, Chennai
- St. Patrick's Church, Chennai
- St Mary's Co-Cathedral, Chennai
- St. Peter's Church, Royapuram
- St. Anne's Church, Chennai
- St.Therese of Infant Jesus Church, Kandanvilai
- St. Antony's Church, Chemmanvilai
- Our Lady of Lourdes Church, Tiruchirappalli
- St. Paul's Church, Diu
- Our Lady of Lourdes Cathedral, Thrissur
- St. Antony's Forane Church
- Mary Matha Syro-Malabar Church, Ollur
- St. Thomas Church, Malayattoor
- Our Lady of Egypt Church
- Church of Our Lady of Dolours, Wadala
- Our Lady of Immaculate Conception Church, Mt. Poinsur
- Church of Our Lady of Health, Cavel
- Our Lady of Good Health Church, Pattumala
- St. Arockiya Nathar Church, Vavathurai
- Church of Immaculate Conception
- Church of St. Augustine, Goa
- Church of Our Lady of the Rosary (Goa)
- Church and Convent of St. Francis of Assisi, Goa
- St. Cajetan Church, Goa
- Our Lady of the Immaculate Conception Church, Panjim
- Our Lady of Grace Church (Chorão Island)
- St Bartholomew's Church (Chorão Island)
- Church of St. Anne, Talaulim
- Church of Our Lady of Springs, Anjediva Island
- Igreja de Nossa Senhora das Neves, Rachol
- St. Cajetan Church, Assagao
- St Clara's Church (Assonora)
- St. Jerome Church (Mapusa)
- St. Michael's Church, Anjuna
- Our Lady of Rosary Church, Kallakurichi
- Fatima Church, Kolkata

== Shrines ==
This section does not include the minor basilicas.

- Infant Jesus Church, Bangalore
- Our Lady of Ransom Church, Kanyakumari
- St. Jude's Shrine, Jhansi
- St.Philomena's Forane Church & St. Chavara Pilgrim Centre, Koonammavu, Cochin, Kerala.
- Church of Our Lady of Snow, Kallikulam, Tamil Nadu
- Our Lady of Lourdes Shrine, Villianur, Puducherry
- Shrine of St. Antony of Padua, Kaloor Ernakulam
- St. Antony major Shrine, Uvari, Tamil Nadu
- Church of Our Lady of Light - Chennai
- Korattymuthy
- Shrine of Our Lady of Health, Hyderabad
- Dhori Mata Tirthalaya
- Sacred Heart Shrine, Idaikattur
- Little Mount Shrine

== Chapels ==
- St. Aloysius Chapel - Kodialbail
- Chapel of St. Catherine
- Chapel of Our Lady of the Mount
- Capela de Nossa Senhora da Saúde (Chorão Island)
- Chapel of Sacra Familia (Chorão Island)
- Chapel of St. Jerome (Chorão Island)

== See also ==
- List of Roman Catholic dioceses in India
- Roman Catholicism in India
