= Our Lady of Presentation Church, Mathapuram =

Our Lady of Presentation Church
- Punidha Kaanikai Madha Alayam
- புனித காணிக்கை மாதா ஆலயம்
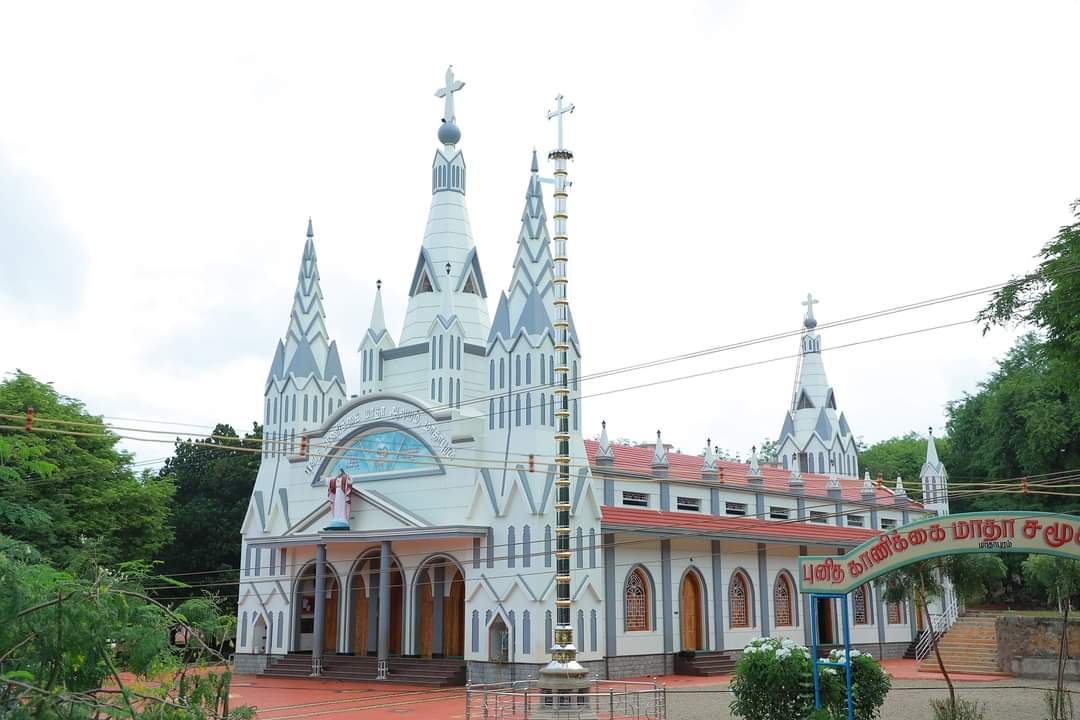
- Side view of this church
- Our Lady of Presentation Church
- 8.2524129°N 77.2052344°E
- Location: Tholayavattam, Vilavancode, Kanyakumari district, Tamil Nadu
- Country: India
- Denomination: Catholic
- Religious institute: Jesuit
- Website: https://olpresentationchurch.org

History
- Status: Active
- Founded: 1949
- Dedication: St. Mary

Architecture
- Functional status: Sub-Station Church
- Architectural type: Church
- Style: Medieval
- Groundbreaking: 2015
- Completed: 2017

Administration
- Archdiocese: Madurai
- Diocese: Kuzhithurai
- Deanery: Vencode
- Parish: Vizhunthayambalam

Clergy
- Archbishop: Antony Pappusamy
- Bishop: Antony Pappusamy
- Priest: Charles Viju

Punitha Kanikkai Matha church is situated in the south end of Tamil Nadu in a village called Mathapuram, which is near the town of Karungal in Kanyakumari district, India, and belongs to the Roman Catholic Diocese of Kuzhithurai.

== History ==
The place Mathapuram is formally known as "Villapatty". During the reign of Travancore-Cochin kings. There used to be a small walkable way from kottar to Trivandrum which passed through Villapatty. The merchants and travellers used to walk via this way to reach Trivandrum. There was a Stonehenge 'Sumaithangai' where the tenders used to off-load their merchandise/loads to take rest for a while.

== Cross ==
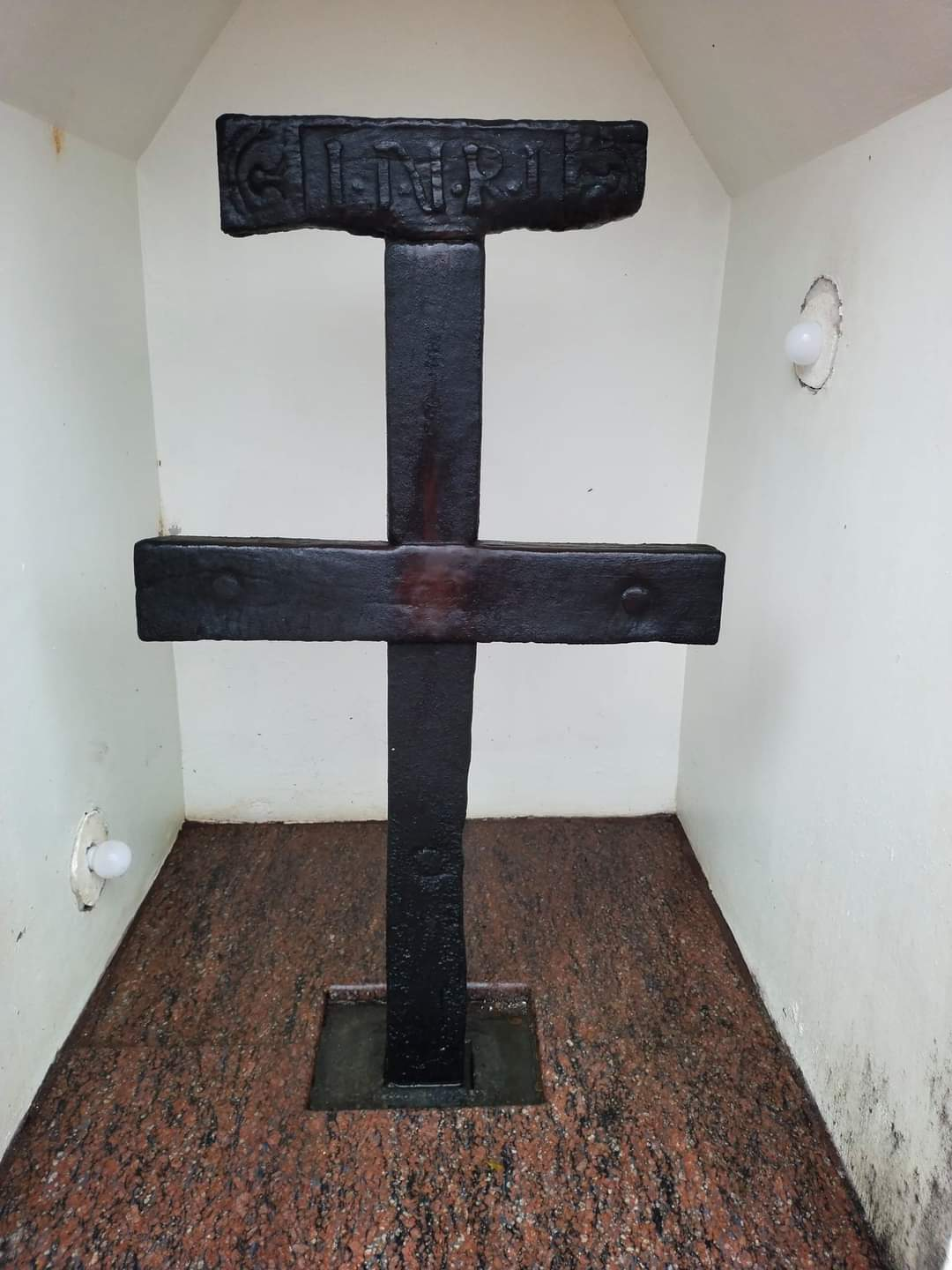
Cross in the church

In 1978, the bishop of Changanacherry diocese Mar. Antony Padiyara, who came to inaugurate St.Thomas church at Mathapuram paid a visit to this Cross and saw the cross and observed the Roman letters INRI inscribed on it and told that it might have been a cross built during the time of St.Thomas, the apostle.

== Chapel ==
In those days whenever the local people were subjected to diseases, disasters and natural calamities, they went to this grotto and offered their prayers to get relief from their difficulties. This bought name and fame for the grotto and made more people get attracted to it. However, in order to accommodate more people they wanted to increase the size of the grotto. So they built a building thatched in coconut leaves. This was later converted to a Chapel. The people who were sick stayed there during night time. Later people who participated in Christmas carols also used this place. In the course of time, the structure was improved by paving tiles in the roof. In the year 1949, a pious man installed a wooden statue of our Lady made in Germany in the chapel. The local people were astonished to see our Lady's statue and they chanted excitedly and began to call "KANIKKAI MADHA". Since then the name of the place was changed to Mathapuram from the previous name Villapatty.

== Church ==
On seeing the enthusiasm of the devotees and piety of local people Rev. Fr. Maria Arockiyam took the initiative to build a concrete building. In 1989, the work started. It was picked up by Rev. Fr. Lucas completed the construction and was blessed by the Kottar Bishop Leon A Dharmaraj on 23 December 1994 and the normal services continued.

== Present Church ==
The existing church was old and in a dilapidated condition. It was very insufficient to accommodate the people on Sunday mass. The construction of the new church gained momentum by Rev. Fr. Sekhar Micheal and on 19 July 2015 Bishop Jerome Dhas, laid the foundation stone for the present church. The construction of new church was completed by the guidance of Fr. Charles Viju and this was blessed and inaugurated by the Bishop of Kuzhithurai Diocese on 11 August 2017.

== See also ==
- St. Therese of Infant Jesus Church, Kandanvilai
- St. Francis Xavier's Cathedral, Kottar
- Our Lady of Ransom Church, Kanyakumari
