= Diocese of Kuzhithurai =

Roman Catholic diocese in Tamil Nadu, India

Coordinates: 8.3219°N 77.1948°E

Diocese of Kuzhithurai Kuzhithuraien(sis)

Location
- Country: India
- Ecclesiastical province: Madurai

Statistics
- Area: 915 km^{2} (353 sq mi)
- Population: Total; Catholics: 855,485; 364,222 (42.57%)
- Parishes: 100

Information
- Rite: Roman Rite
- Established: 22 December 2014
- Cathedral: Holy Trinity Cathedral, Thirithuvapuram
- Secular priests: 131
- Language: Tamil

Current leadership
- Pope: Leo XIV
- Bishop: Albert George Alexander Anastas
- Metropolitan Archbishop: Antonysamy Savarimuthu

Website
- http://kuzhithuraidiocese.in

The Roman Catholic Diocese of Kuzhithura is a diocese located in Tamil Nadu. It was erected on 22 December 2014 by Pope Francis with territory taken from the Diocese of Kottar. He appointed Fr. Jerome Dhas Varuvel as the first bishop of the diocese.

For health reasons Bishop Jerome submitted his resignation to Pope Francis which was accepted on 6 June 2020. Simultaneously, Pope Francis appointed the Metropolitan Archbishop of Madurai, Antony Pappusamy, as Apostolic Administrator of the diocese of Kuzhithura.

Bifurcation of the diocese of Kottar had been a long-standing demand of the people of the region. 100 Parishes from Thiruthuvapuram and Mulagumoodu vicariates of Kottar diocese were put under the administrative control of Kuzhithurai diocese. Prior to this bifurcation, Kottar diocese had been one of the largest in India with over 500,000 Catholics.

== Ordinaries ==
The following is a list of the bishops of Kuzhithurai and their terms of service:

- Jerome Dhas Varuvel, S.D.B. (22 December 2014 – 6 June 2020)
  - Antony Pappusamy (Apostolic Administrator; 6 June 2020 – 13 January 2024)
- Albert Anastas (13 January 2024 – present)

== Churches ==
- Elavuvilai (1927) : St. Aloysius Church, Elavuvilai.
- Karenkadu (1778) : Church of St. Aloysius Gonzaga
- Mulagumoodu (1860) : Church of Our Lady of Nativity
- Mankuzhy (1906) : Church of St. Francis Xavier
- Mathiravilai (1906) : Church of Our Lady of Assumption
- Puthenkadai (1908) : Church of St. James
- Mullanganavilai (1912) : Church of St. Antony
- Manalikarai (1913) : Church of St. Joseph
- Madathattuvliai (1918) : Church of St. Sebastian
- Puthukadai (1920) : Church of Our Lady of Assumption
- Thirithuvapuram (1920) : Church of the Most Holy Trinity
- Vavarai (1924) : Church of Our Lady of Mt. Carmel
- Cheruvalloor (1930) : Church of St. Michael Archangel
- Kulasekharam (1931) : St. Augustine's Church, Kulasekharam
- Palliyady (1931) : Church of the Sacred Heart of Jesus
- Packiapuram (1936) : Church of St. Eusthachius
- Siluvaipuram (1936) : Church of St. John of the Cross
- Chemparuthivilai (1939) : Church of St. Antony of Padua
- Kandanvilai (1944) : Church of St. Therese of Child Jesus
- Vencode (1949) : Church of St. Francis Xavier
- Kadayal (1952) : Church of the Sacred Heart of Jesus
- Kalkurichy (1954) : Church of St. Joseph
- Kappukad (1955) : Church of St. Antony
- Poottetty (1956) : Church of St. Antony of Padua
- Amsi (1958) : Church of the Imm. Heart of Mary.
- Pacode (1959) : Church of the Sacred Heart.
- Madhapuram (1997) : Our Lady of Presentation Church, Mathapuram.
- Valanoor (1957) : Church of St. Joseph

== Mulagumoodu Vicariate Parishes ==
- Karenkadu (1778) : Church of St. Aloysius Gonzaga
- Mulagumoodu (1860) : Church of Our Lady of Nativity
- Mankuzhy (1906) : Church of St. Francis Xavier
- Mathiravilai (1906) : Church of Our Lady of Assumption
- Mullanganavilai (1912) : Church of St. Antony
- Manalikarai (1913) : Church of St. Joseph
- Madathattuvliai (1918) : Church of St. Sebastian
- Palliyady (1931) : Church of the Sacred Heart of Jesus
- Chemparuthivilai (1939) : Church of St. Antony of Padua
- Kandanvilai (1944) : St. Therese of Infant Jesus Church, Kandanvilai
- Kalkurichy (1954) : Church of St. Joseph
- Murasancode (1963) : Church of O.L. of Mt. Carmel
- Konamkadu (1966) : Church of St. Francis Xavier
- Kappiarai (1966) : Church of St. Catherine
- Thundathhuvilai (1966) : Church of St. Antony
- Alanvilai (1968) : Church of Our Lady of Lourdes
- Vellicode (1968) : Church of Our Lady of Sorrows
- Mylacode (1971) : Church of Our Lady of Mt. Carmel
- Thuckalay (1972) : Church of St. Elias
- Kanjiracode (1975) : Church of Our Lady of Rosary
- Pattarivilai (1979) : Church of Our Lady of Snows
- Kuttaikadu (1984) : Church of St. Jude Thadeus
- Mulavilai (1984) : Church of Christ the King
- Sahaya Nagar (1986) : Church of O.L. of Perpetual Succour
- Velliavilai (1996) : Church of Good Shepherd
- Kozhiporvilai (1997) : Church of St. Michael
- Appattuvilai (1999) : Church of St. Joseph
- Solapuram (1999) : Church of St. Pius X
- Manali (2000) : Church of St. Antony
- Panavilai (2000) : Church of the Holy Redeemer
- Koottamavu (2001) : Church of O. L. of Perpetual Succour
- Thiruvithancode (2004) : Church of the Ascension of O. Lord
- Arockiapuram (2006) : Church of St. Roch
- Kallukoottam (2008) : Church of Our Lady of Fatima
- Manalikuzhivilai (2008) : Church of St. Michael the Archangel
- Konnakuzhivilai (2008) : Church of Our Lady of Sorrows
- Muttaicadu (29.11.2009) : Church of St. Francis Xavier
- Pilaviali (04.05.2010) : Church of St. George
- Chetticharvilai (09.05.2010) : Church of Little Flower
- Cherukol Karumputhottam (16.05.2010) : Church of St. Antony
- Valvachagostam (24.05.2010) : Church of St. Antony
- Kuzhivilai (2011) : Church of St. Francis Xavier
- Mukkalampadu (2011) : Church of Our Lady of Sorrows
- Appattuvilai (22.06.2011) : St. Antony's Church, Chemmanvilai
- Kallaravilai (26.06.2011) : Church of Our Lady of Fatima
- Vattam (2012) : Church of St. Antony
- Nullivilai (26.05.2013) : Church of Our Lady of Lourdes
- Varthanvilai (01.11.2014) : Church of St. Antony
- Irudayapuram (03.11.2014) : Church of the Sacred Heart of Jesus
- Chirankuzhi : Church of St. Michael
- Manchadi : Church of St. Joseph

== Thiruthuvapuram Vicariate Parishes ==
- Puthenkadai (1908) : Church of St. James
- Thirithuvapuram (1920) : Church of the Most Holy Trinity
- Puthukadai (1920) : Church of Our Lady of Assumption
- Vavarai (1924) : Church of Our Lady of Mt. Carmel
- Cheruvalloor (1930) : Church of St. Michael Archangel
- Kulasekharam (1931) : Church of St. Augustine
- Packiapuram (1936) : Church of St. Eustachius
- Siluvaipuram (1936) : Church of St. John of the Cross
- Vencode (1949) : Church of St. Francis Xavier
- Kadayal (1952) : Church of the Sacred Heart of Jesus
- Kappukad (1955) : Church of St. Antony
- Poottetty (1956) : Church of St. Antony of Padua
- Amsi (1958) : Church of the Imm. Heart of Mary
- Pacode (1959) : Church of the Sacred Heart
- Melpuram (1967) : Church of the Holy Guardian Angel
- Parakunnu (1968) : Church of the S.H. of Jesus
- Melpalai (1971) : Church of Our Lady of Assumption
- Elavuvilai (1972) : Church of St. Aloysius
- Kanjampuram (1972) : Church of St. Therese of Child Jesus
- Kaliakkavilai (1973) : Church of St. Antony
- Kolvel (1973) : Church of O.L. of Mt. Carmel
- Lourdugiri (1975) : Church of Our Lady of Lourdes
- Marthandam (1979) : Church of St. Francis Xavier
- Nallayanpuram (1979) : Church of Good Shepherd
- Vizhunthayambalam (1984) : Church of St. Antony
- Themanoor (1989) : Church of O.L. of Assumption
- Attoor (1991) : Church of St. Andrew
- Choozhal (1991) : Church of St. Michael Archangel
- Nagacode (1995) : Church of St. Antony
- Maruthancode(1997) : Church of St. Antony
- Pechipparai (1998) : Church of St. Joseph
- Munchirai (2000) : Church of Our Lady of Good Health
- Kottoorkonam (2001) : Church of Infant Jesus
- Thumbali (2001) : Church of the Imm. Heart of Mary
- Iruthayapuram (2002) : Church of Christ the King
- Ithayapuram (2005) : Church of the Sacred Heart
- Manchakonam (2006) : Church of St. Therese of Child Jesus
- Kamplar (2008) : Church of St. Joseph
- Pullani (2008) : Church of St. Antony
- Alancholai (14.05.2009) : Church of Our Lady of Lourdes
- Mathoor (06.11.2009) : Church of St. Joseph
- Ambalakadai (09.11.2009) : Church of Saints Peter & Paul
- Eanchacode (12.11.2009) : Church of Our Lady of Per. Help
- Palavilai (14.05.2010) : Church of St. Antony
- Yettacode (17.05.2010) : Church of St. Francis Xavier
- Fatimapuram (11.02.2012) : Church of Our Lady of Fatima
- Vanniyoor (07.03.2012) : Church of St. Joseph
- Chentharai (20.08.2013) : Church of St. Francis Xavier
- Thickurichy (04.11.2013) : Church of St. Gabriel
- Vellayambalam ( 31.10.2014) : Church of St. Antony
- Kuzhithurai (05.11.2014) : Church of St. Michael the Archangel
- Valanoor (1957) : Church of St. Joseph

== Schools ==
- St. Francis Hr. Sec. School, Vavarai, S.T. Mangad 629 172
- St. Francis Hr. Sec. School, Vencode 629 171
- St. Joseph’s Hr. Sec. School, Mulagumoodu 629 167
- St. Joseph’s Hr. Sec. School, Thirithuvapuram, Kuzhithurai 629 163
- St. Mary’s Hr. Sec. School, Melpalai 629 152
- St. Joseph's Hr. Sec. School, Vizhunthayambalam, Thengapattanam 629 173
- Amala Convent Hr. Sec. School, Thuckalay 629 175
- St. Aloysius Hr. Sec. School, Velliavilai, Palapallam 629 159
- St. Antony's Hr. Sec. School, Enayam Puthenthurai, Keezhkulam 629 193
- St. Maria Goretti Hr. Sec. School, Manalikarai 629 164
- St. Aloysius High School, Elavuvilai 629 171
- St. Antony's High School, Kappukad 629 162
- St. Joseph's High School, Siluvaipuram, Kollencode 629 160
- Carmel Girls High School, Manalikarai 629 174
- Infant Jesus Girls High School, Mulagumoodu 629 167
- St. Antony's High School, Mullanganavilai 629 157
- St. John Vianney's Girls High School, Palliady 629 169
- St. Lawrence Higher Secondary School. Madathattuvilai
- Sacret Heart High School, Pacode 629 168
- St.Antony High School, Chemparuthivilai 629 166
- St. Anthony's high school thundaththuvilai, karungal
- Nanjil Catholic School, Vazhuthalampallam (CBSE)
- St. Joseph's Middle School, Valanoor, Chathencode 629 153

== See also ==
- Catholic Church in India
