= Thomas Paulsamy =

Roman Catholic Bishop Emeritus of Dindigul, India (b. 1951)

Most Reverend Thomas Paulsamy
- Bishop Emeritus of Dindigul
- Archdiocese: Madurai
- Diocese: Dindigul
- Appointed: 11 April 2016

Orders
- Ordination: 25 May 1977
- Consecration: 22 May 2016 by Salvatore Pennacchio

Personal details
- Born: 2 August 1951 (age 75) Poolampatti
- Denomination: Roman Catholic
- Education: Maryknoll School of Theology
- Motto: PEACE THROUGH OUR HEARTS

Thomas Paulsamy is the served Bishop of the Roman Catholic Diocese of Dindigul, India. He is the second bishop of the diocese.

== Early life and education ==
He was born on 2 August 1951 in N. Poolampatty, Diocese of Tiruchy. He has acquired Masters in Arts. He studied Philosophy & Theology at St. Paul's Seminary, Tiruchirapalli and M.Th at Maryknoll School of theology, New York, USA.

== Priesthood ==
He was ordained a priest on 25 May 1977 in St. Joseph’s Church, Dindigul by then Bishop Most Rev.Dr.Thomas Fernando D.D,.D.C.L. for the Diocese of Tiruchy

== Episcopate ==
He was appointed Bishop of Dindigul on 11 April 2016 by Pope Francis and ordained on 22 May 2016 by Salvatore Pennacchio
