= Marambadi =

Coordinates: 10°29′N 78°00′E

- Village
- Interactive map of Marambadi
- Country: India
- State: Tamil Nadu
- District: Dindigul
- Taluk: Vedasandur

Population (2001)
  - Total: 5,571

Marambadi is a village in Vedasandur taluk, Dindigul district, Tamil Nadu, India. It has a population of 5,571 according to the 2001 national census. The village is situated in the Dindigul region and is connected by road with Dindigul and Vedasandur. Marambadi has several educational institutions, places of worship and other facilities serving the local population.

== History ==
Marambadi is an old rural settlement in the Dindigul region of Tamil Nadu. The history of the village is closely connected with the development of agriculture, local communities and Christian religious institutions in the surrounding area.

The wider Dindigul region has experienced the rule and influence of several South Indian political powers over the centuries, including the Pandyas, Cholas, Vijayanagara Empire and Madurai Nayaks. Dindigul subsequently came under the influence of the Kingdom of Mysore and later the British Raj. The settlements around Dindigul developed within these changing political and administrative systems.

Marambadi became particularly notable for its Catholic Christian heritage. Historical records from the early twentieth century demonstrate that Marambadi was already an established Catholic mission centre. A 1921 Jesuit catalogue records Marambady as a mission station and lists Fr. Daniel Aloysius as the missionary serving there. This provides documentary evidence that the Catholic mission in Marambadi was established by at least the early twentieth century.

== St. Antony's Shrine ==
One of the most important landmarks in Marambadi is the St. Antony's Shrine, dedicated to St. Antony the Great (also known as St. Anthony the Hermit). The shrine is associated with the Roman Catholic tradition and is listed as a Roman-Latin parish under the Diocese of Dindigul.

According to historical and local accounts about the shrine, devotion to St. Antony at Marambadi dates back approximately three centuries. One account states that a statue of St. Antony the Hermit was brought to Marambadi by merchants about 300 years ago, after which devotion to the saint became established in the village.

The shrine subsequently became an important centre of pilgrimage. The annual feast of St. Antony the Hermit is traditionally celebrated in January, with the principal celebrations taking place from 16 to 18 January. Historical descriptions of the shrine report that large numbers of pilgrims visit Marambadi during these celebrations.

The shrine is notable not only among Catholics but also for attracting devotees from other Christian denominations and religious communities. The tradition of seeking the intercession of St. Antony has contributed to the shrine's reputation as an important pilgrimage centre in the Dindigul region.

The present-day parish listing identifies St. Antony Shrine–Marambady as a Roman-Latin parish of the Diocese of Dindigul, located at Marambady via Thadicombu, Dindigul district, Tamil Nadu.

== St. Antony the Great ==
The shrine is dedicated to Anthony the Great, an Egyptian Christian monk and hermit who lived during the third and fourth centuries. He is traditionally regarded as one of the important early figures in Christian monasticism and is widely venerated in Christianity.

Anthony's life of prayer, solitude and asceticism became an inspiration for generations of Christians. His association with the life of a hermit is reflected in the dedication of the Marambadi shrine to St. Antony the Hermit.

The dedication is significant because St. Antony the Great is distinct from St. Anthony of Padua, another widely venerated Catholic saint. The Marambadi shrine specifically identifies with St. Antony the Great and his tradition of Christian hermit spirituality.

== Marambadi and Catholic heritage ==
The history of St. Antony's Shrine has played an important role in the religious and cultural development of Marambadi. Over generations, the shrine became closely associated with the identity of the village and attracted pilgrims from neighbouring villages and distant parts of Tamil Nadu.

The development of the Catholic community also resulted in the establishment of educational and social institutions in the village. Historical accounts of the parish mention schools and various Catholic associations that served the local community. The religious institutions therefore became connected not only with worship but also with education, community life and social activities.

Marambadi has also produced members of the Catholic clergy. Among the notable people associated with the village is Antony Pappusamy, who was born in Marambady in 1949. He was ordained a priest in 1976, became a bishop in 1999 and was appointed the first Bishop of Dindigul in 2003. He was later appointed Archbishop of Madurai in 2014.

== Religious festivals ==
The annual feast of St. Antony the Great is one of the major religious events associated with Marambadi. The January celebration brings together local residents, pilgrims and devotees from surrounding areas.

The feast has traditionally included special prayers, religious services and devotional activities. The large participation during the feast has helped establish Marambadi as an important Catholic pilgrimage destination in the region.

== Modern Marambadi ==
Over time, Marambadi developed from a predominantly rural settlement into an established village with schools, transportation facilities, religious institutions and other community infrastructure.

The continuing presence of St. Antony's Shrine gives the village a distinctive religious and cultural identity. The shrine, together with the long-established Catholic community, remains an important part of the history and heritage of Marambadi.

Today, Marambadi is both a residential and agricultural village in Vedasandur taluk and a recognised religious destination because of its historic association with St. Antony the Great.

== Education ==
Per the 2001 census, Marambadi has six primary schools, three middle schools, one secondary school and one senior secondary school.

== Transport ==
As of 2013, the Tamil Nadu State Transport Corporation operates a bus service routed Dindigul–Marambadi–Vedasandur.
