= Savarinathen Iruthayaraj =

Indian bishop

- Bishop of Palayamkottai
- Church: Catholic Church
- Diocese: Diocese of Palayamkottai
- In office: 17 May 1973 – 15 July 1999
- Predecessor: Diocese erected
- Successor: Jude Gerald Paulraj

Orders
- Ordination: 20 December 1959
- Consecration: 12 September 1973 by Justin Diraviam

Personal details
- Born: 14 July 1927 Ooty, Presidency of Fort St. George, British Raj, British Empire
- Died: 18 October 2001 (aged 74)

Savarinathen Iruthayaraj (14 July 1927 in Ooty – 18 October 2001) was an Indian cleric and Bishop of the Roman Catholic Diocese of Palayamkottai.

== Biography ==
Iruthayaraj was born on 14 July 1927 in Ooty.

He received the Sacrament of Holy Orders on 20 December 1959.

On 17 May 1973, Pope Paul VI appointed him as Bishop of the newly created Diocese of Palayamkottai. The Archbishop of Madurai, Justin Diraviam, bestowed episcopal ordination on 12 September of the same year; co-consecrators were the Archbishop of Bangalore, Packiam Arokiaswamy, and the Archbishop of Changanacherry, Antony Padiyara.

On 15 July 1999, Iruthayaraj resigned as Bishop of Palayamkottai.

He died on 18 October 2001.
