= Jerome Dhas Varuvel =

Indian Roman Catholic bishop (1951–2026)

Most Reverend Jerome Dhas Varuvel S.D.B.
- Bishop Emeritus of Kuzhithurai
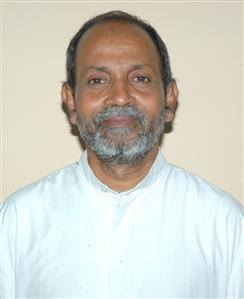
- Native name: ஜெரோம் தாஸ் வறுவேல்
- Church: Roman Catholic
- Metropolis: Madurai
- Diocese: Kuzhithurai
- Elected: 22 December 2014
- Installed: 24 February 2015
- Term ended: 6 June 2020
- Predecessor: Position established
- Successor: Albert Anastas

Orders
- Ordination: 2 June 1985 by Pope John Paul II
- Consecration: 24 February 2015 by Peter Remigius, Antony Pappusamy and George Antonysamy

Personal details
- Born: Jerome Dhas; 21 October 1951 Paduvoor, Madras State, India
- Died: 24 March 2026 (aged 74) Chetpet, Chennai, Tamil Nadu, India
- Denomination: Roman Catholic
- Residence: Unnamalaikadai, Tamil Nadu, India
- Education: Salesian Pontifical University
- Motto: Dominus Pastor Meus

Jerome Dhas Varuvel, SDB (21 October 1951 – 24 March 2026) was an Indian Roman Catholic prelate, who served as the Bishop of the Diocese of Kuzhithurai from 2014 until 2020.

== Early life and education ==
Varuvel was born on 21 October 1951 in Paduvoor in the diocese of Kottar. He attended Carmel Secondary School in Nagercoil. From 1967 to 1968, he followed the pre-university course at the Scott Christian College, Nagercoil. From 1968 to 1970, he attended the minor seminary at St. Aloysius Seminary in Nagercoil. He studied philosophy at Sacred Heart Seminary in Poonamallee (1970–1973). He also obtained a bachelor's degree in Economics from Arulanandar College, Karumathur, Madurai (1973–1976).

== Career ==
In 1976, Varuvel decided to join the Salesians of Don Bosco. After completing the pre-novitiate (1976–1977) and novitiate (1977–1978), he made his religious profession temporary on 24 May 1978. On 24 May 1981, he made his perpetual vows. From 1981 to 1986, he studied theology at the Salesians in Rome. He had a bachelor's degree in Economics and in Theology and a Licentiate in Pedagogy at the Pontifical Salesian University in Rome.

Varuvel was ordained priest by John Paul II on 2 June 1985. It belongs to the Salesian Province of Chennai, Tamil Nadu.

On 22 December 2014, Pope Francis appointed him the first bishop of the newly-erected diocese of Kuzhithurai, which was bifurcated from the diocese of Kottar. He was consecrated as bishop of the diocese of Kuzhithurai on 24 February 2015 at a ceremony presided by Peter Remigius, bishop of the diocese of Kottar. Co-consecrators were the Archbishop of Madurai, Antony Pappusamy, and the Archbishop of Madras-Mylapore, George Antonysamy.

Due to ill health, Varuvel submitted his resignation to Pope Francis, who accepted it on 6 June 2020 and appointed Archbishop Antony Pappusamy of Madurai as Apostolic Administrator of Kuzhithurai with immediate effect.

After priestly ordination he held the following positions:

- 1985–1986: Completion of studies at the Pontifical Salesian University (Rome);
- 1986–1990: Vice-Rector of the Novitiate in Vellakinar;
- 1990–1992: Rector of the Pre-Novitiate in Tirupattur;
- 1992–1994: Rector of the Pre-Novitiate in Maiyam;
- 1994–1996: Dean of Student Salesian Trichy;
- 1996–2001: Pastor-Rector of the Con-Cathedral of Madras-Mylapore;
- 1999–2003: Provincial Councillor;
- 2001–2002: Director of Kalvi Solai (Center for education and culture), Tirupattur;
- 2002–2003: Director of Kalvi Solai (Center for education and culture), Ennore;
- 2003–2010: Director of Mount Don Bosco in Thalavadi, Erode;
- 2010–2014: Director of Novices at Yeallagiri Hills, Diocese of Vellore;
- 22 December 2014: Appointed the first bishop of the diocese of Kuzhithurai;
- 24 February 2015: Consecration to the order of bishop.

== Death ==
Varuvel died at the Care Home of the Little Sisters of the Poor on Harrington Road, Chetpet, Chennai, on 24 March 2026, following complications arising from dementia and Parkinson's disease. He was 74.

Catholic Church titles
Preceded by Position established	Bishop of Kuzhithurai; 2015–2020	Succeeded by Albert Anastas
