= Chemmanvilai =

Chemmanvilai செம்மன்விளை
- Village
- Chemmanvilai

- Location in Tamil Nadu, India Chemmanvilai (India)
- Coordinates: 8°13′26″N 77°20′13″E
- Country: India
- State: Tamil Nadu
- District: Kanyakumari

Population (2012)
  - Total: 1,500

Languages
  - Official: Tamil
- Time zone: UTC+5:30 (IST)
- PIN: 629175
- Telephone code: 91-4651
- Vehicle registration: TN-75
- Nearest city: Nagercoil, Marthandam
- Literacy: 85%
- Lok Sabha constituency: Kanyakumari
- Vidhan Sabha constituency: Padmanabhapuram
- Website: Official Site

Chemmanvilai ( செம்மன்விளை) is a village in Chadayamangalam Panchayat, Kalkulam Taluk in Kanyakumari District, Tamil Nadu, India. St. Antony's church stands in the middle of the village.

== Location and transport ==
It is near to the Nagercoil–Thiruvananthapuram Highway. The nearest railway station is located in Eraniel at a distance of approximately 6 kilometres (3.7 mi). The nearest airport to Chemmanvilai is the Trivandrum International Airport, which is approximately 54 kilometres (34 mi) away. Chemmanvilai is also called Appattuvilai.

== Demographics ==
As of 2012 Church census, Chemmanvilai had a population of 1500. Males constitute 51% of the population and females 49%. Chemmanvilai has an average literacy rate of 85%, higher than the national average of 59.5%; 83% of the males and 89% of females are literate.

== St. Antony Church ==
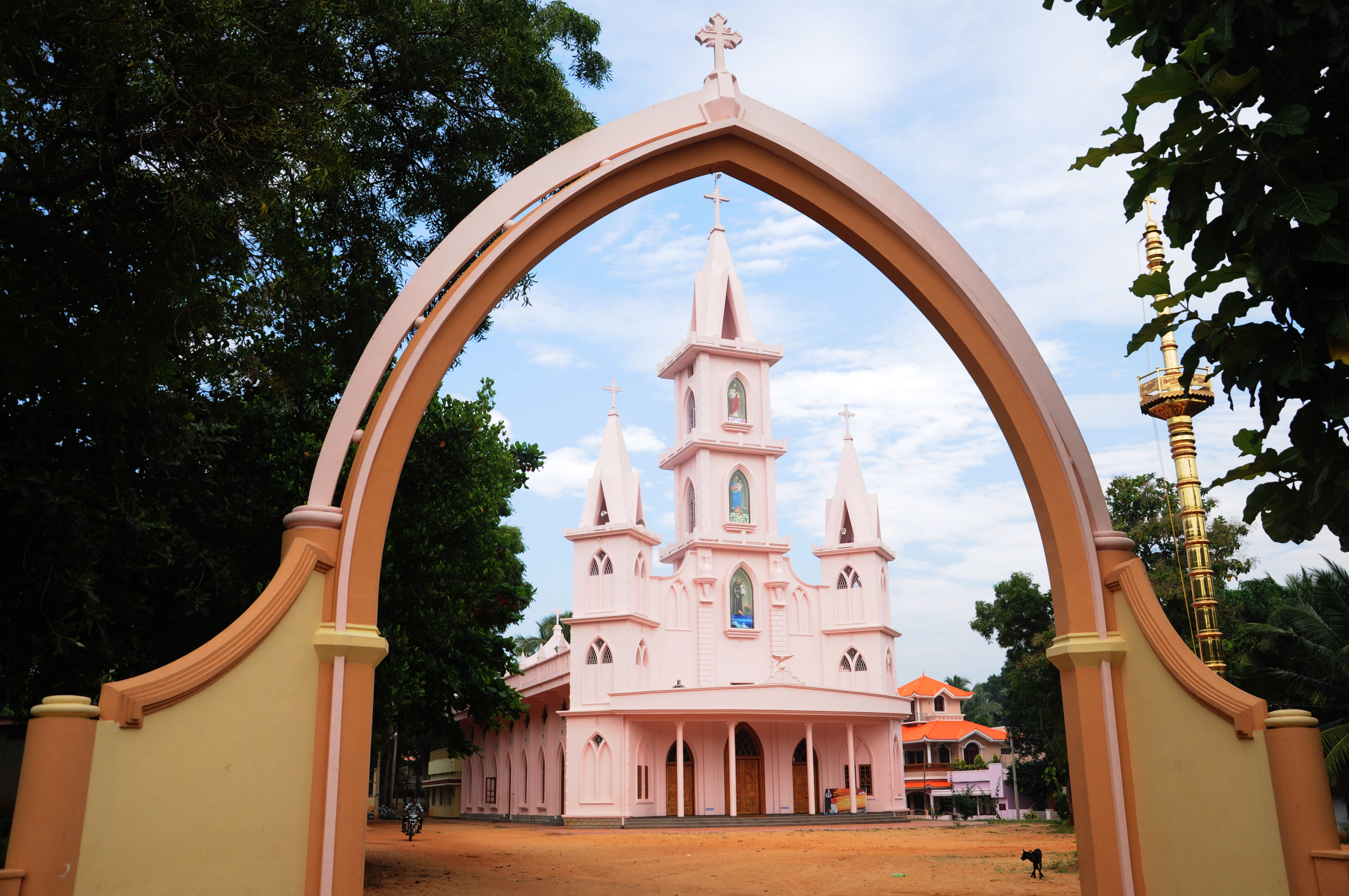
St. Antony Church, Chemmanvilai, a new church opened on 25 May 2012

St.Antony's Church , located right in the middle of the village, is also an important worship center that plays an important role in the lives of the people in the village. St. Antony's Church is an ancient church which is mentioned in ancient Indian history of Travancore Kingdom. In the little church in Chemmanvilai martyr Devasahayam Pillai came to pray in his last days of life. The Church is under the control of Roman Catholic Diocese of Kuzhithurai.

=== St. Antony's festival ===
St. Antony Church Festival is celebrated for ten days with grand events with prayer, music, drama and fireworks that add color to this religious event. The festival dates are based on the St. Antony Feast, in last weeks of May every year. And also the feast of St. Antony will be celebrated on 13 June. People from various places come here and pray with St. Antony.
