= Diocese of Palayamkottai =

Roman Catholic diocese in Tamil Nadu, India

Coordinates: 8.7226°N 77.7394°E

Diocese of Palayamkottai Dioecesis Palayamkottaiensis பாளையங்கோட்டை மறைமாவட்டம்

catholic

Location
- Country: India
- Ecclesiastical province: Madurai
- Metropolitan: Madurai

Statistics
- Area: 6,102 km^{2} (2,356 sq mi)
- Population: Total; Catholics: (as of 2004); 2,652,273; 123,789 (4.7%)

Information
- Rite: Latin Rite
- Cathedral: St. Xavier's Cathedral in Palayamkottai

Current leadership
- Pope: Leo XIV
- Bishop: Vacant
- Metropolitan Archbishop: Antonysamy Savarimuthu
- Bishops emeritus: Jude Gerald Paulraj

Website
- www.palayamkottaidiocese.org

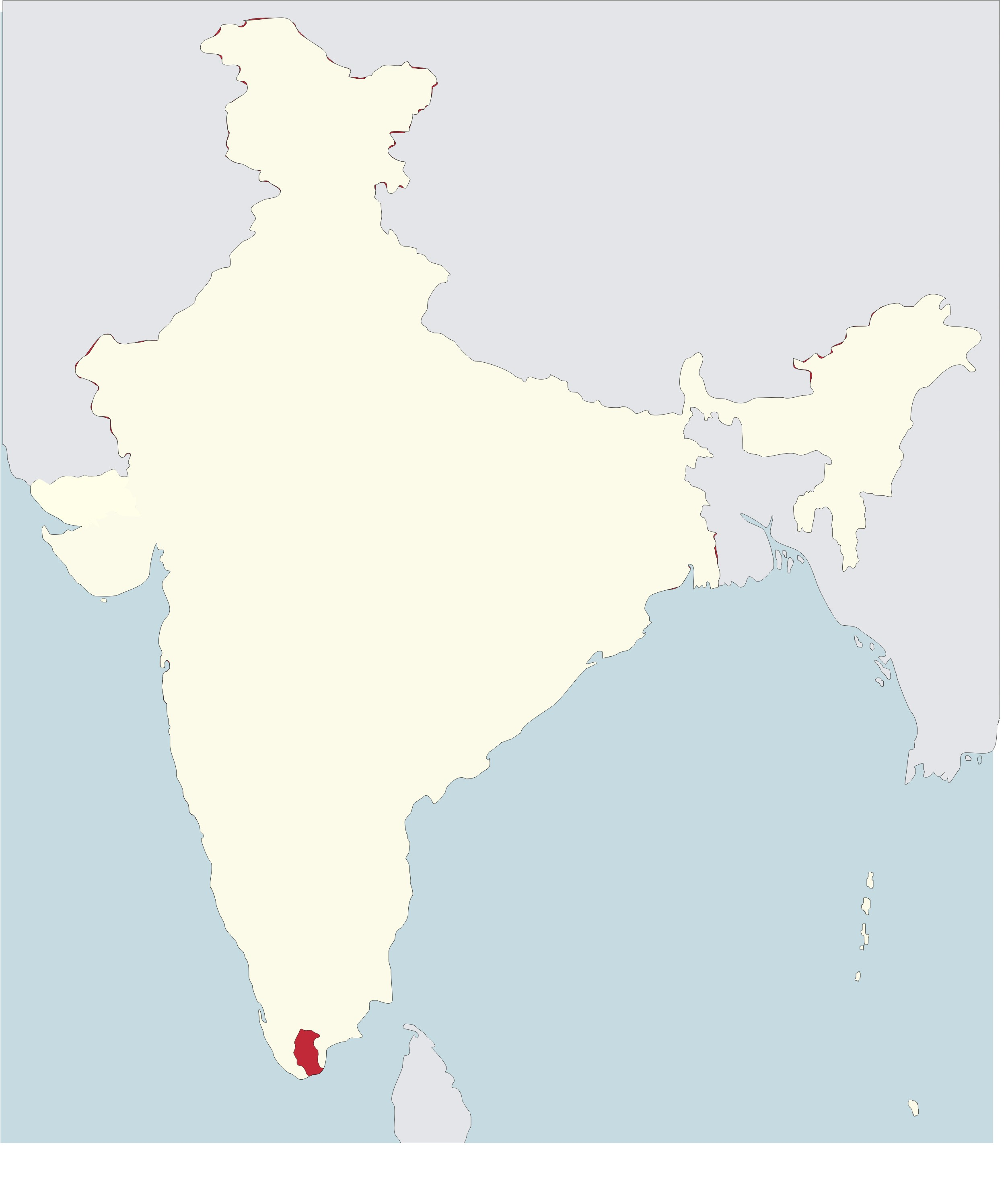
Map of Catholic Diocese of Palayamkottai in India

The Roman Catholic Diocese of Palayamkottai (Latin: Palayamkottaien(sis)) is a diocese located in the city of Palayamkottai in the ecclesiastical province of Madurai in India.

== History ==
- 17 May 1973: Established as Diocese of Palayamkottai from Metropolitan Archdiocese of Madurai.

== Bishops of Palayamkottai ==
- Savarinathen Iruthayaraj (17 May 1973 – 15 July 1999), resigned
- Jude Gerald Paulraj (23 October 2000 – 29 June 2018), retired
  - Apostolic Administrator Antony Pappusamy (29 June 2018 – 15 December 2019), Archbishop of Madurai
- Antonysamy Savarimuthu (20 November 2019 – 5 July 2025), appointed Archbishop of Madurai

== Saints and causes for canonisation ==
- Servant of God Peter Reddy OFS, (Paul Chenappan Reddy or Peter Paradesi)
