= Antony Pappusamy =

Indian priest (born 1949)

His Grace Most Reverend Monsignor Antony Pappusamy
- Metropolitan Archbishop Emeritus of Madurai
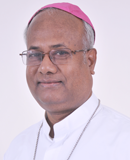
- Archdiocese: Roman Catholic Archdiocese of Madurai
- See: Roman Catholic Archdiocese of Madurai
- Appointed: 26 July 2014
- Installed: 24 August 2014
- Predecessor: Peter Fernando
- Successor: Antonysamy Savarimuthu
- Other posts: Chairman Tamil Nadu Bishops' Council Commission for Clergy and Religious. Apostolic Administrator Diocese of Kuzhithurai(additional charge)
- Previous posts: Bishop of Roman Catholic Diocese of Dindigul; Auxiliary Bishop of Madurai and Titular Bishop of Zaba

Orders
- Ordination: 7 July 1976 by Bishop Thomas Fernando Of Tiruchirappalli
- Consecration: 4 February 1999 by Archbishop Marianus Arokiasamy of Madurai

Personal details
- Born: 1 October 1949 (age 77) Marambadi Tamil Nadu
- Residence: Archbishop's House, K. Pudur, Madurai 625 007, Tamil Nadu, India
- Education: Pontifical University of Saint Thomas Aquinas
- Motto: ARISE

Mons. Antony Pappusamy (born 1 October 1949) is Metropolitan Archbishop of Roman Catholic Archdiocese of Madurai in India from 2014 to 2025.

== Early life and education ==
Pappusamy was born on 1 October 1949 in Marambadi, Tamil Nadu. He completed his high school education at the R.C. Higher Secondary School, Trichy, and also did courses on Latin and Initiation from St. Peter's Seminary, Madurai. He graduated from St Joseph's College, Tiruchirappalli. He completed his studies in Theology and Philosophy at St. Paul's Seminary, Trichy. He is an alumnus of Pontifical Lateran University and has acquired a Diploma in Spirituality from Pontifical University of Saint Thomas Aquinas.

== Priesthood ==
He was ordained a Catholic priest on 7 July 1976 in St. Mary's Cathedral, Tiruchirappallii then Bishop Most Rev.Dr.Thomas Fernando D.D,.D.C.L. for the Diocese of Tiruchy

== Episcopate ==
He was appointed Auxiliary Bishop of Madurai and Titular Bishop of Zaba on 5 November 1998 and ordained a Bishop on 4 February 1999 by Archbishop Marianus Arockiasamy. He was appointed as First Bishop of the Roman Catholic Diocese of Dindigul on 10 November 2003 and installed on 28 December 2003. He was appointed Archbishop of the Roman Catholic Archdiocese of Madurai on 26 July 2014 by Pope Francis and installed on 24 August 2014. He also chairs Tamil Nadu Bishops' Council's commission for Clergy and Religious.

He was appointed Apostolic Administrator of the Diocese of Palayamkottai on 29 June 2018 by Pope Francis, replacing Bishop Jude Gerald Paulraj. He continued to remain the Apostolic Administrator until the consecration of Bishop Antonysamy (Bishop of Palaymkottai).

On 6 June 2020, he was appointed Apostolic Administrator of Kuzhithurai upon the resignation of Bishop Jerome Dhas Varuvel, S.D.B. He retired From Office on 4 November 2024 after completed 75 years of age

== Book ==
Christian Commitment to Service : Faith in Practice in honour of Antony Pappusamy is published by Christian World Imprints.
