= St. Therese of Infant Jesus Church, Kandanvilai =

St. Therese of Child Jesus Church
- Location: Kandanvilai
- Country: India
- Denomination: Catholic
- Website: http://www.thereseofkandanvilai.info

History
- Status: Active
- Founded: 1923
- Dedication: St. Therese of Child Jesus

Administration
- Archdiocese: Madurai
- Diocese: Kuzhithurai

Clergy
- Archbishop: Antonysamy Savarimuthu
- Bishop: Albert George Alexander Anastas

The St. Therese of Child Jesus Church, Kandanvilai is the first church which is dedicated to St. Therese after her beatification and blessed on 7 April 1924. Kandanvilai is a village in Kanyakumari District, Tamil Nadu, India. It is on the Nagercoil–Monday Nager Highway, 13 kilometres (8.1 mi) from Nagercoil. The nearest railway station is Erainel, and the nearest airport is Trivandrum. Kandanvilai Church has three substations; Eraniel, Chithanthopue and Pandaravilai.

== The ancient history ==
In 1904, the coadjutor bishop of Quilon, Aloysius Maria Benzigar, sent a proposal to Rome for dividing the Kollam metropolis into three new dioceses as Trivandrum, Quilon and Kottar. Gregory XVI the Pope of Rome agreed to the separation of the vicariate of Verapoly into three divisions for administrative convenience.

Bishop of Quilon the Most Rev. Aloysius Maria Benzigar was invited to Rome for participating St. Therese`s Beatification ceremony on 29 April 1923; during the ceremony, there were a bishop`s council meeting was conducted. In the meeting, Quilon Bishop was declared that, I dedicate the Kandanvilai Church which is under Quilon Diocese (previously it was under Quilon Diocese) to St. Therese and which will be the first church to St. Therese after her beatification. Based on that, a chapel was blessed by him on 7 April 1924.

St. Therese of Child Jesus Church, Kandanvilai, was merged under Kuzhithurai Diocese, India on 22 December 2014.

== Roman Catholic Diocese of Kuzhithurai ==
Bifurcation of the diocese of Kottar had been a long-standing demand of the people of the region. 100 Parishes from Thiruthuvapuram and Mulagumoodu vicariates of Kottar diocese were put under the administrative control of Kuzhithurai diocese. Prior to this bifurcation, Kottar diocese had been one of the largest in India with over 500000 Catholics.

St. Therese of Child Jesus Church, Kandanvilai, is merged under Kuzhithurai Diocese, India, on 22 December 2014.
