= Kandanvilai =

Neighbourhood in Kanyakumari district, Tamil Nadu, India

Kandanvilai (கண்டன்விளை) Mukattu Kathirvilai
- Location in Tamil Nadu, India
- Coordinates: 8°12′25″N 77°19′45″E
- Country: India
- State: Tamil Nadu
- District: Kanyakumari

Languages
  - Official: Tamil
- Time zone: UTC+5:30 (IST)
- PIN: 629810
- Telephone code: 04652
- Vehicle registration: TN-75
- Lok Sabha: Kanyakumari
- constituency: Colachel
- Panchayat: Nullivilai
- Block: Thuckalay
- Taluk: Kalkulam

Kandanvilai (கண்டன்விளை) is a village in Kanyakumari District in the Indian state of Tamil Nadu.

== History ==
In 1935, Kandanvilai was attached to the Karankadu parish under the Diocese of Quilon. During this time Mr Packianathan donated his land to a Diocese and requested that a church be built in Kandanvilai [கண்டன்விளை]. The Bishop of the Diocese of Quilon, Most Rev Fr. Aloysius Maria Benziger OCD consented and together with the parish priest of Karankadu came down to Kandanvilai to select a site. The bishop, the priest and the people were overjoyed and confirmed the site for the Church. In Tamil, the vision was interpreted as "Kanavil Kanda Vilai."

== Geography ==
It is on the Nagercoil–Monday Nager Highway, 13 kilometres (8.1 mi) from Nagercoil.

== Transport ==
The nearest railway station is Erainel. The nearest airport is Trivandrum.

== Religion ==
Kandanvilai is home to the St. Therese of Infant Jesus Church, the first church built for St. Therese of Lisieux after her Beatification on April 7, 1924.

== Administration ==
1. Village Administrative office 2. Nullivilai panchayat office

== Education ==
1. Govt Higher Secondary School 2. St. Therese Primary School 3. Aldrin Matriculation School

== Facilities ==
1. State Bank of India, Kandanvilai (கண்டன்விளை) 2. Indian Bank, Kandanvilai (கண்டன்விளை) 3. Agricultural Cooperative Society, Kandanvilai (கண்டன்விளை) 4. Post office, Kandanvilai (கண்டன்விளை)
