= Diocese of Dindigul =

Roman Catholic diocese in Tamil Nadu, India

Coordinates: 10.3617°N 77.9729°E

Diocese of Dindigul Dioecesis Dindigulensis திண்டுக்கல் மறைமாவட்டம்

Location
- Country: India
- Ecclesiastical province: Madurai
- Metropolitan: Madurai

Statistics
- Area: 6,266 km^{2} (2,419 sq mi)
- Population: Total; Catholics: (as of 2023); 2,183,155; 153,156 (7.0%)
- Parishes: 51

Information
- Denomination: Catholic Church
- Sui iuris church: Latin Church
- Rite: Roman Rite
- Established: 10 November 2003; 22 years ago
- Cathedral: Cathedral of St Joseph in Dindigul
- Patron saint: Saint Joseph
- Secular priests: 195 (65 Diocesan, 130 Religious Orders)

Current leadership
- Pope: Leo XIV
- Bishop: sede vacante
- Metropolitan Archbishop: Antonysamy Savarimuthu
- Apostolic Administrator: Antonysamy Savarimuthu
- Bishops emeritus: Thomas Paulsamy

Website
- Website of the Diocese

The Roman Catholic Diocese of Dindigul (Latin: Dindigulen(sis)) is a diocese located in the city of Dindigul in the ecclesiastical province of Madurai in India.

== History ==
- 10 November 2003: Established as Diocese of Dindigul from the Metropolitan Archdiocese of Madurai and Diocese of Tiruchirapalli

== Leadership ==
Bishops of Dindigul (Roman Rite)

- Antony Pappusamy (10 November 2003 – 26 July 2014), appointed Archbishop of Madurai
- Thomas Paulsamy (11 April 2016 – 3 August 2026), retired
  - Apostolic Administrator Antonysamy Savarimuthu (13 August 2026 – Present), Archbishop of Madurai

== Saints and causes for canonisation ==
- Servant of God Augustine Pereira
