= St. Patrick's Church, Chennai =

Church in Chennai, India

Coordinates: 13.008099°N 80.195327°E

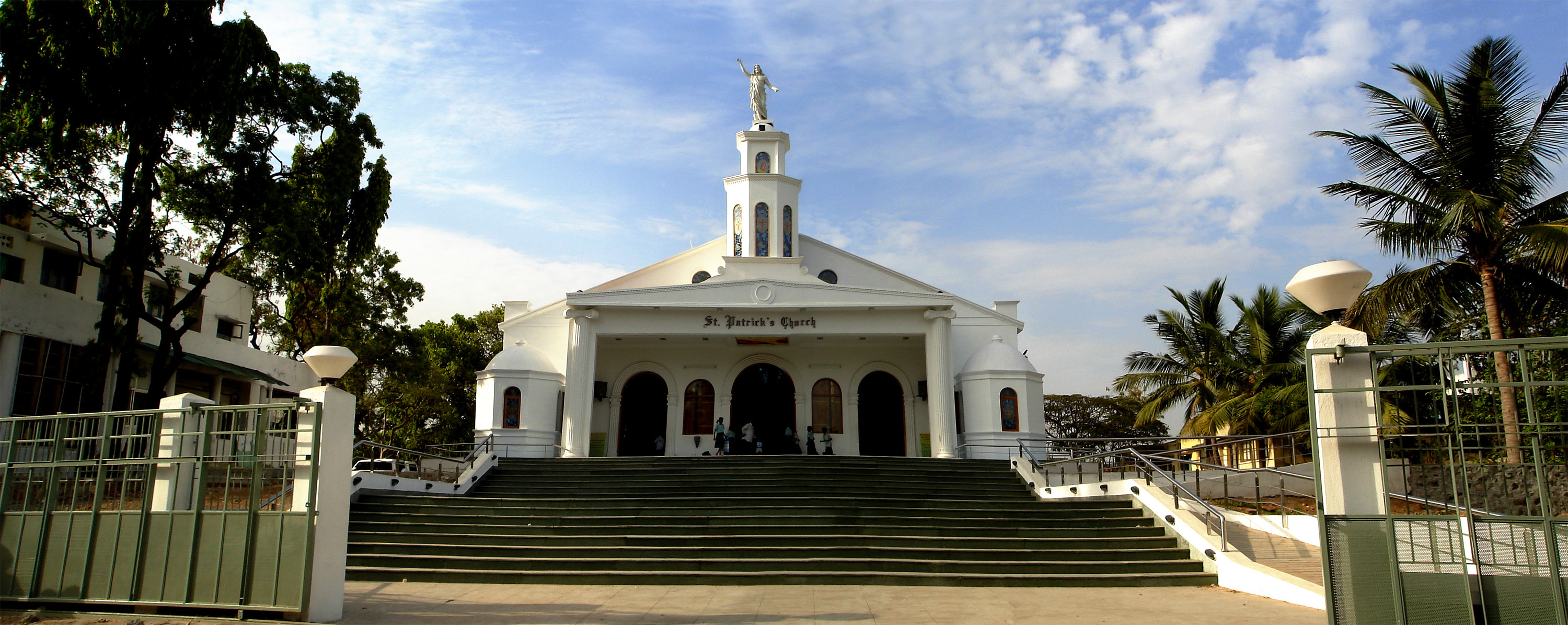
Facade of the church

Saint Patrick's Church is a Roman Catholic church located near St. Thomas Mount, in Chennai, India. From 1887, the church at the foot of St.Thomas Mount had been used as the Parish Church as it was convenient for the growing population.

This Church was actually built for the garrison in 1830 by Daniel O. L. Auig, the Vicar Apostolic of Madras. According to the records available the Parish of St. Thomas Mount was under San Thome till 1561 and it was made an independent Parish around 1575.

With the available records in 1791 Manoel de Virgem Maria had worked here in this Parish along with others succeeding him. In January 2008, John Bosco built a totally new and spacious Parish Church on the Roman model as the traditional Church was in a dilapidated condition. The Grotto of Our Lady is also modeled on that of Lourdes itself.

Shylock Stephen currently serves as the parish priest. This parish has more than 2000 Roman Catholic families.

== History of Parish Priests ==
Parish Priest
Succession of Parish Priests

1	Jose Vaz Caetano Sebastiao Manoel Crastro	1714-1788
2	Antonio de Rozario Cardoza Vicar	1817
3	Ignacio Colho, 'cura'	1819
4	Antonio Vicente de Almeida	1819
5	Antonio da Costa	1819-1824
6	Antonio do Razario Bardozo	1824
7	Antonio Da Costa	1824
8	Victoino Nazr. De Farias	1824
9	Ceatana Salvador Pereira	1846-1867
10	F. R. A. D'Souza (vigario)	1867-1868
11	A. D'Souza	1868-1880
12	R. F. Barreto (Roque Francisco)	1880-1889
13	Miguel Jose Roquacim Carvelho	1889-1890
14	J. Beatty & A. C. D'Silva	1896-1900
15	D. Da Costa & I. Arputham	1900-1903
16	D. Da Costa	1903-1904
17	D. Da Costa & H. Costa	1904-1905
18	D. Da Costa & A. B. C. Druem	1905-1911
19	M. L. Cabral & A. B. C. Druem	1911-1917
20	M. L. Cabral & Peter	1917-1918
21	M. L. Cabral & Dias	1918-1920
22	M. L. Cabral	1920-1922
23	M. L. Cabral & J. B. X De Souza	1922-1923
24	M. Motha Vas & J. B. X De Souza	1923-1924
25	M. Motha Vas & R. De Souza	1924-1927
26	P. Justin Beon & R. De Souza	1927-1928
27	P. Justin Beon & Paul	1928-1929
28	P. Justin Beon & F. D. Silva	1929-1931
29	J. Fruytier & J. N. Mesquita	1931-1933
30	J. Fruytier & G. Rodrigues	1933-1934
31	J. Frutier & A. Louis Xavier	1934-1938
32	J. Fruytier & A. S. De Rosario & C. Nazareth	1938-1939
33	J. Fruytier & A. S. De Rosario & P. P. Lobo	1939-1940
34	Frutier	1940-1948
35	Louis Xavier A	1949-1964
36	Mathew Vettical	1964-1984
37	Arulappa P. T	1984-1985
38	Kanikairaj S.	1985-1992
39	Thomas J Mundakal	1992-2000
40	Vincent Chinnadurai	2000-2004
41	John Bosco P.	2004-2009
42	Backiya Regis G	2009-

== See also ==
- Religion in Chennai
