= St. Antony's Church, Chemmanvilai =

Cathedral of St.Antony
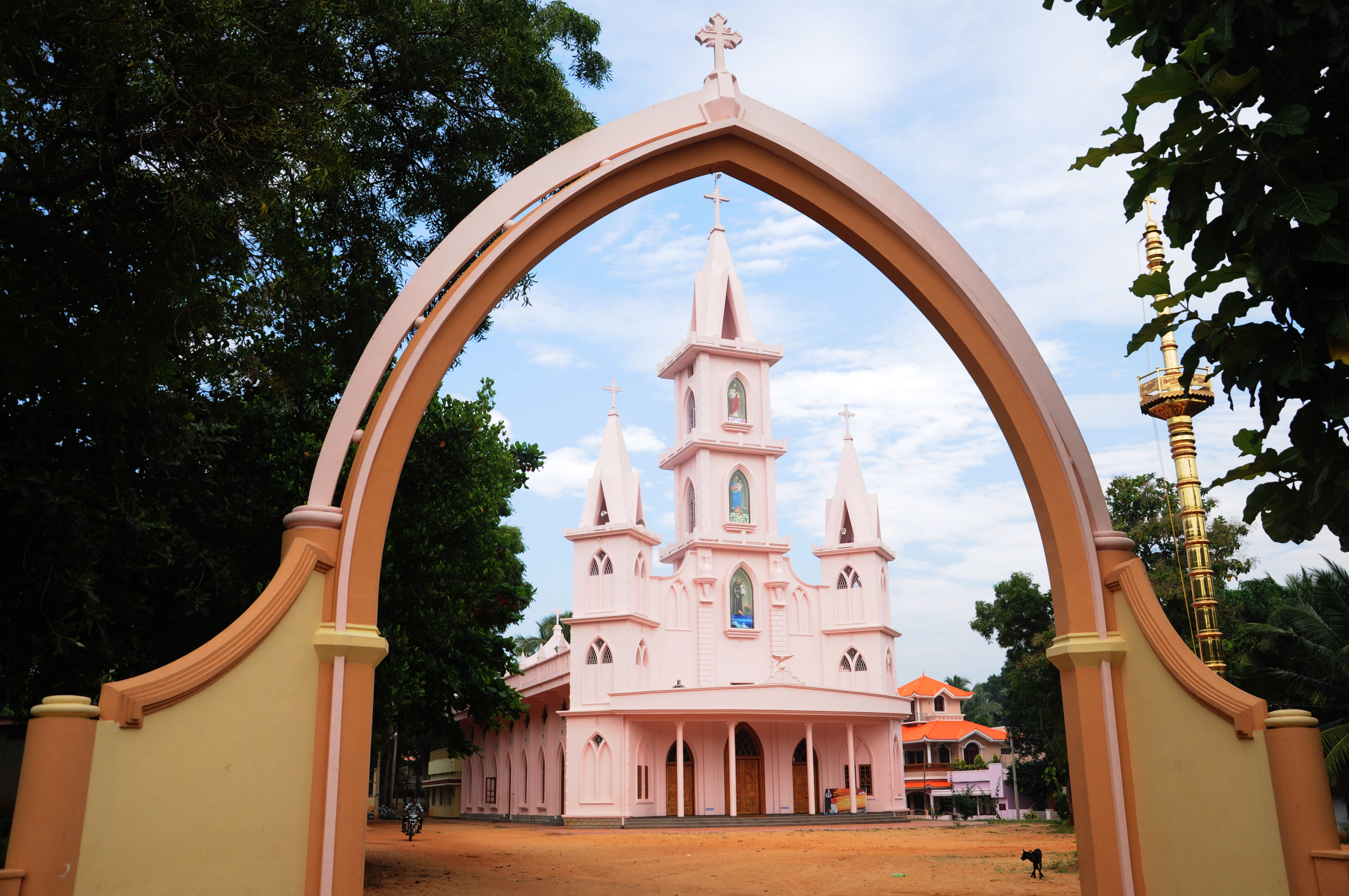
- Cathedral of St.Antony
- 8°13′24″N 77°20′12″E
- Location: Chemmanvilai, Appattuviali, Thuckalay-629175
- Country: India
- Denomination: Roman Catholic
- Website: Official site

History
- Founded: 1942; 84 years ago
- Founder: Fr. Mathias

Administration
- District: Kanyakumari
- Diocese: Diocese of Kuzhithurai

St. Antony's Church, Chemmanvilai is a Roman Catholic Church located in Kanyakumari district, Tamil Nadu, India.

St. Antony's Church, located right in the middle of the Chemmanvilai village, is an important worship center that plays an important role in the lives of the local people. The church is under the control of the Roman Catholic Diocese of Kuzhithurai.

On 25 December 1942, Rev Fr. Mathias of Madathattuvilai Parish helped to establish the small church and hold the first mass there. The first annual festival was held on 11 April 1943.

A second church was established by Bishop Agniswami T.R. on 20 December 1970. Bishop Peter Remigius of Kottar Diocese announced the church as a new parish on 22 June 2011 and the first priest was Rev Fr. Joakins. A.

== Gallery ==
Church gallery

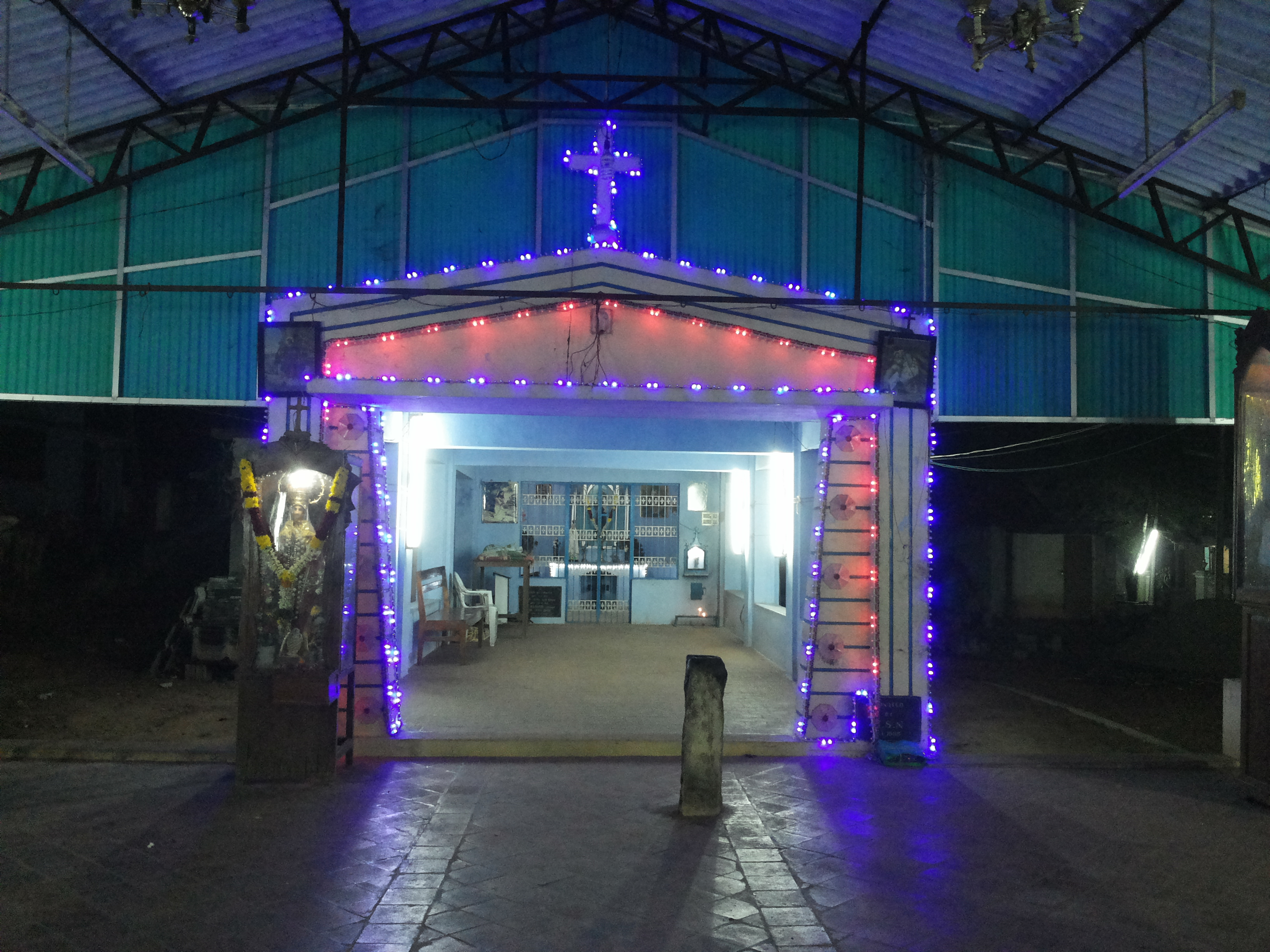
On 25 December 1942, this church was blessed by Fr. Mathias. It is the first church in Chemmanvilai for Saint Antony.

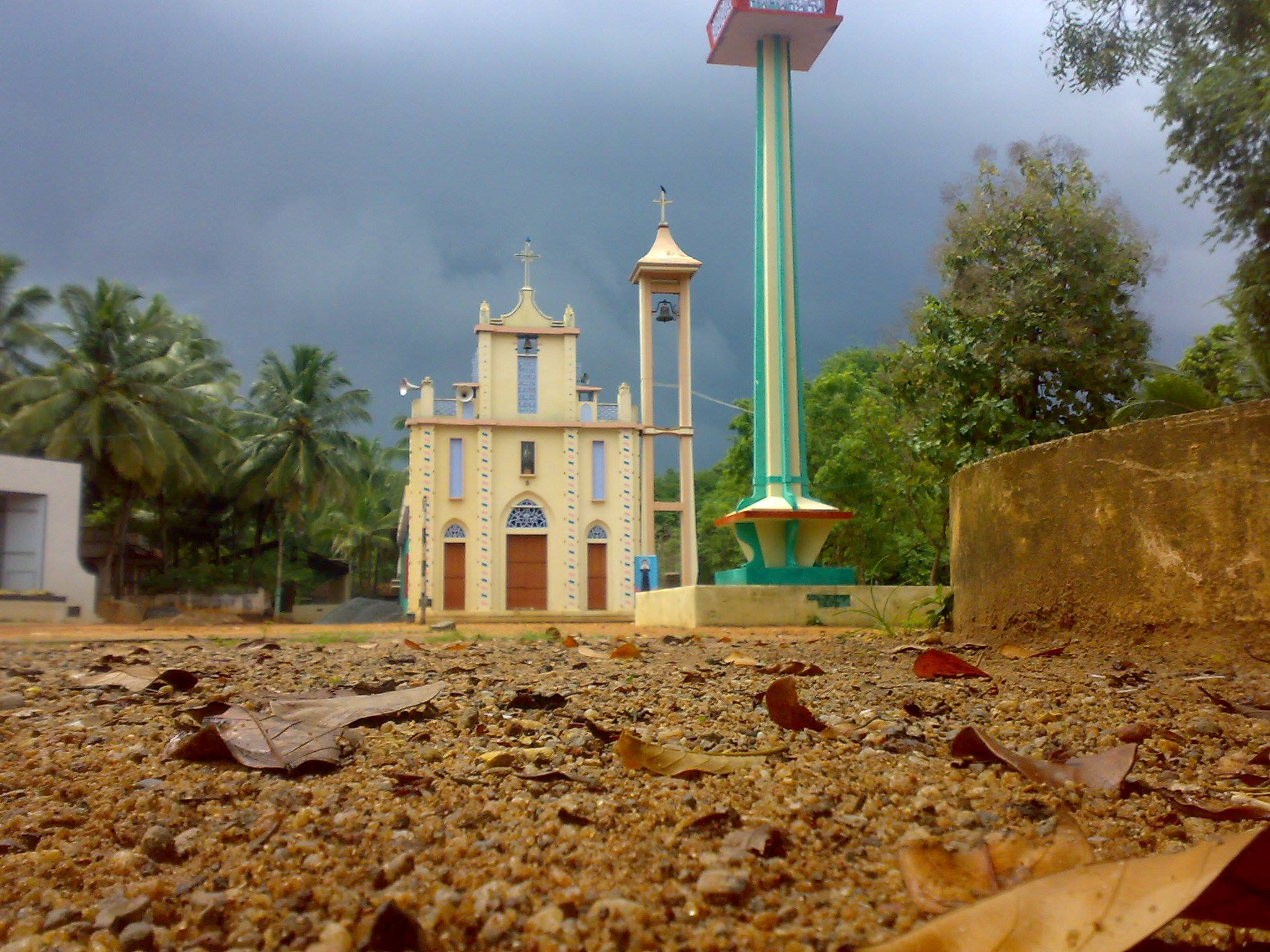
On 20 December 1970, this church was blessed by Bishop Thomas Roch Agniswami, S.J in the presence of Fr. Mathias. It is the second church in Chemmanvilai for Saint Antony.

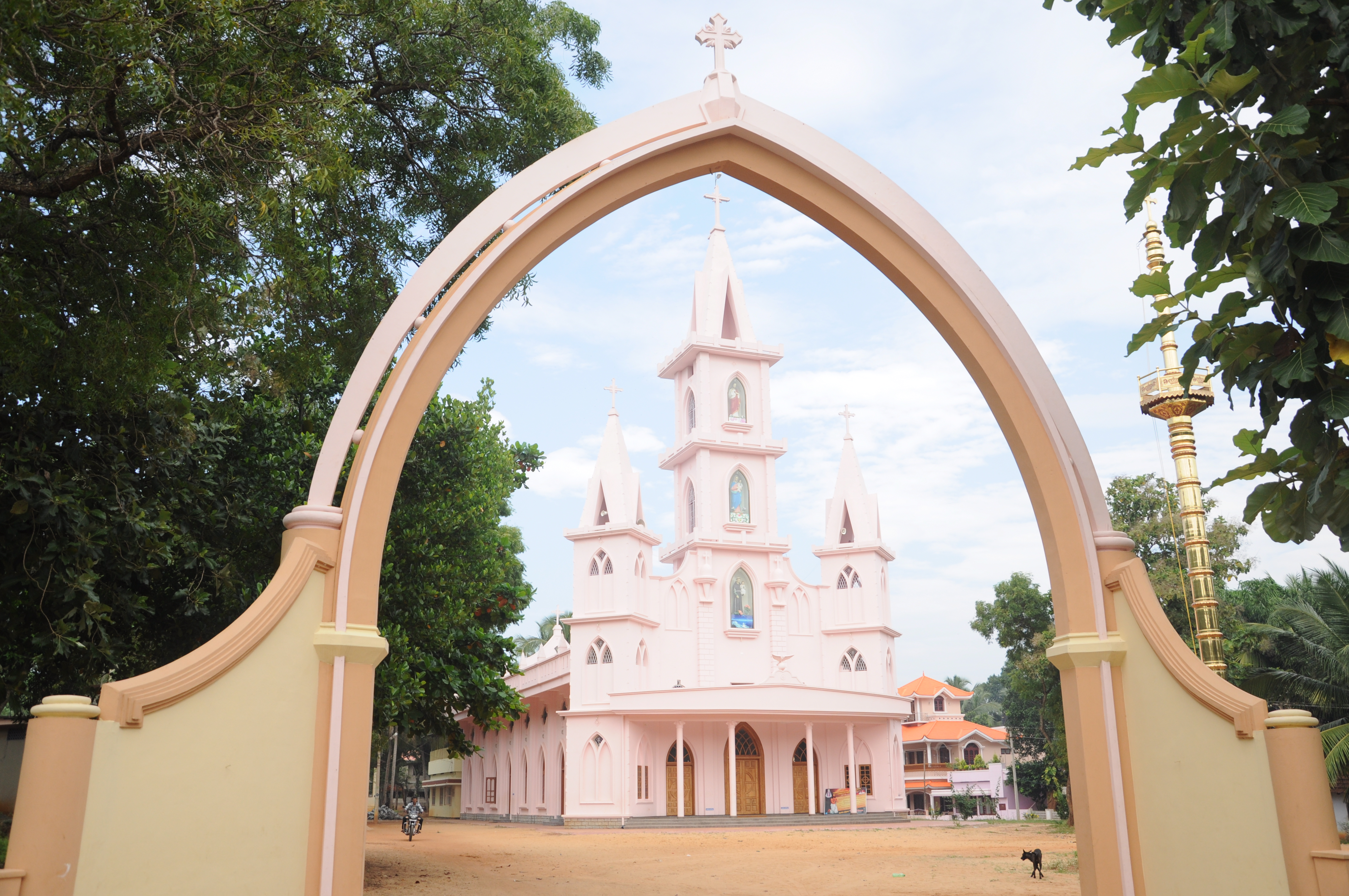
On 25 May 2012 the new church was blessed by Bishop Peter Remigius (Bishop of Kottar Diocese)

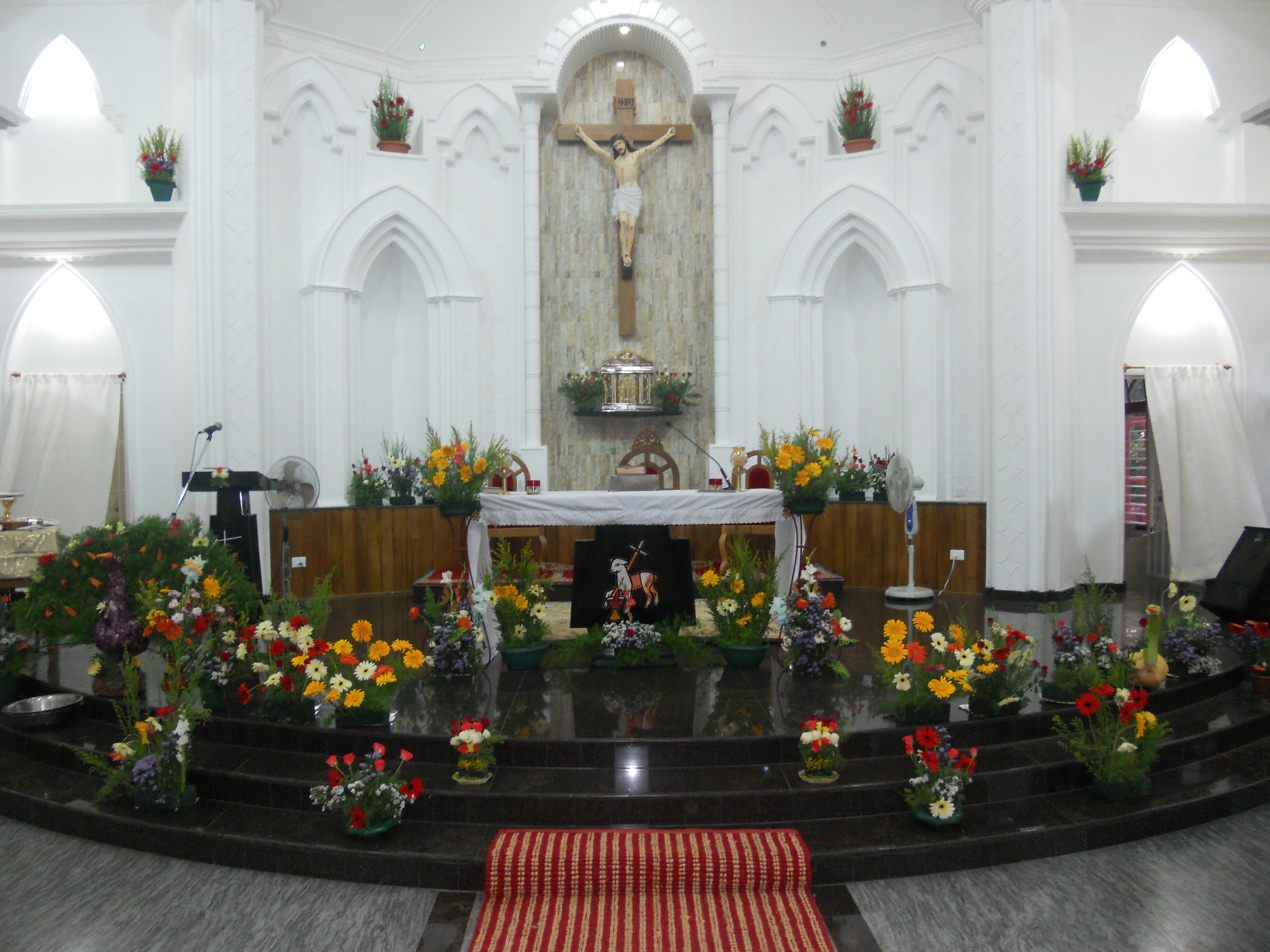
Altar in new church

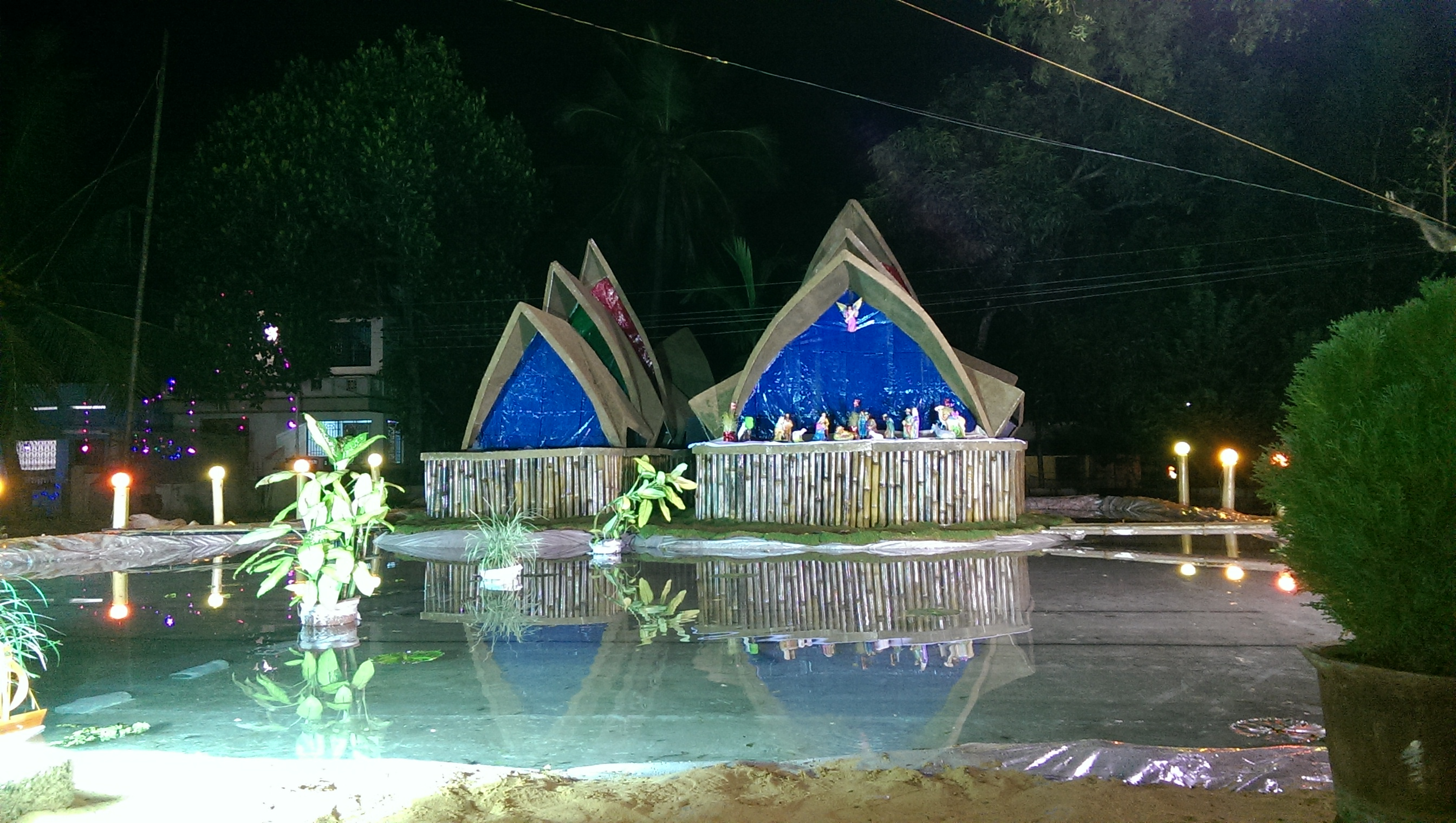
Sydney Opera House, Australia as the model of Christmas Crib 2014
