= St. Peter's Church, Royapuram =

St. Peter's Church
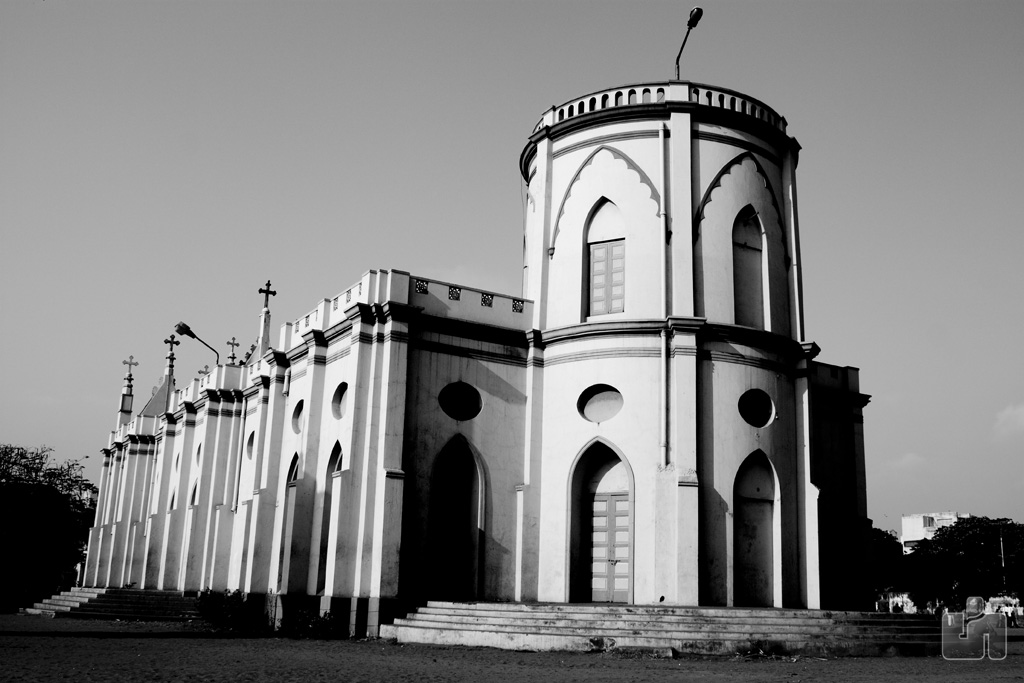
- Front view of the church

- Location within Tamil Nadu
- 13°06′30″N 80°17′44″E
- Location: Royapuram, Chennai
- Country: India
- Denomination: Catholic
- Website: imetechs.com/stpeters/about.htm

History
- Status: Parish church
- Founded: 1825; 201 years ago
- Founder: Gurukula Vamsha Varnakula Mudaliars
- Dedication: 1829

Architecture
- Functional status: Active
- Architectural type: Chapel
- Style: Gothic architecture

Administration
- Archdiocese: Archdiocese of Madras-Mylapore

St. Peter's Church is one of the oldest churches in Royapuram area of Chennai, the capital of the South Indian state of Tamil Nadu. The original structure was built in Gothic architecture in 1829 by Gurukula Vamsha Varnakula Mudaliars, a group of boatmen who were serving the East India Company. They started building the church in 1825 and consecrated it in 1829 with contributions from the Secretary of Marine Board.

St. Peter's Church is a working church with hourly prayer and daily services and follows Roman Catholic sect of Christianity. The chapel was controlled by Vicar Apostolic initially and then split into two churches namely St. Peters and St. Antony's based on the two divisions of Gurukula Vamsha Varnakula Mudaliars, with the former supporting Irish Mission and the latter supporting Goanees. In modern times, it is under the dominion of Archdiocese of Madras. It is one of the most prominent landmarks of Royapuram.

== Architecture ==
The church is built in Gothic architecture. The altar houses conventional Catholic images and prayer halls for the devotees. The plaques of St. Peter, St. Anthony, Jesus Christ, Chindadri Matha are housed in glass chambers in standing posture on the walls facing the devotees, while the image of Child Jesus is located in an open chamber around the sanctum. There is a school and set of shops located in the compound around the Church.

== History ==
Royapuram is believed to have attained its name from St. Peter's Church. In Tamill, Peter indicates Royappar and puram is used to denote place of residence. Gurukula Vamsha Varnakula Mudaliars were a group of boatmen, who helped the naval ships reach the dock. They settled in Fort St. George in Madras Presidency around 1710. Around 1730, they were moved to Chepauk, by which time the community grew as a prosperous one as boat owners, boatmen and fishermen in the region. During the war in 1746, when the French captured Fort St. George, the community fled with the British to Fort St. David at Cuddalore. The community moved back along with the British and were aiding the British in all the vessels that landed. They were thus favoured by the British East India Company. During 1829, Lord Edward Clive asked them to move out of Fort St. George and allocated 720 grounds of land at a place, which would go on to be called Royapuram. They started building a church in 1825 and consecrated it in 1829 with contributions from the Gurukula Vamsha Varnakula Mudaliars and Secretary of Marine Board. The administration of fund lead to litigation with the High Court.

The chapel was controlled by Archdiocese of Mylapore initially. Two factions of Gurukula Vamsha Varnakula Mudaliars developed over a period, with one supporting Irish Mission and the latter supporting Goanees. During 1848, the fighting intensified and the Goanees supporters built the St. Antony's church opposite to the St. Peter's Church. Residents in the area believe that the Church compound saved a lot of lives during the 1962 cyclone. The litigation continued during the 20th century when the legal battle between the Mudaliars and the Archbishop resulted in the Church getting closed for 14 years from 1935-49. It was subsequently ruled by the High Court that the income from the shops and schools around the Church were given to the Archbishop. There was a higher appeal in Supreme Court, which affirmed the rule of the High Court.

== Worship practises ==
St. Peter's Church was originally under the dominions of the Cathedral and later changed hands to Petiti Seminaire School Fathers up to 1860. The priests in the church were originally only French, but during modern times, Tamil people were also allowed. In modern times, the Church is administered by the Roman Catholic Archdiocese of Madras and Mylapore. Mass is performed in the church at 6 AM during weekdays (Monday to Friday ).On Tuesdays, special service is offered for st.Anthony at 6 PM. On Fridays, Special services are offered for the Sacred Heart of Jesus at 6 PM. On Saturdays, service is offered at 5 AM and 6 PM, while on Sundays the service is at 8 AM in Tamil and 6 PM in English. The festival of the church is celebrated during the Christmas times for eight days, starting with flag hoisting on 24 December and ending with a feast and religious lectures on 2 January each year. There are two feasts offered in the church: the feast of St. Peter on 29 June and the second for Our Lady of Voyage called Chitirai Matha from 29 August to 8 September. During the event, there is a car procession with the Church deities taken around the streets of Royapuram.
