= Vedasandur =

Settlement in Dindigul District, Tamil Nadu, India

Vedasandur is a panchayat town in Dindigul district Located at Indian state of Tamil Nadu. Vedasanthoor town is 21 km (13 mi) from Dindigul city, 25 km (16 mi) from Oddanchatram town, and 82 km (51 mi) from Madurai.

== Etymology ==
The name derived from the Vedan Sandhaiur. Vedan means hunter, Sandhai means the place of selling.

Vedasandur is suburban of Dindigul. Vedasandur is located at 10.53°N 77.95°E. It has an average elevation of 219 metres (719 ft). It is located on the banks of Kodaganar river, which is a major drinking water source for Dindigul corporation. NH 7 (Varanasi -Kanyakumari) Highway pass on the Vedasandur. State Highway 152 connecting Vadamadurai to oddanchatram and Palani.

== Demographics ==
As of 2001 India census, Vedasandur had a population of 14998. Males constitute 51% of the population and females 49%. Vedasandur has an average literacy rate of 75%, higher than the national average of 59.5%: male literacy is 81%, and female literacy is 70%. In Vedasandur, 17% of the population is under 6 years of age.

Many spinning mills around Vedasandur.

Vedasandur is well connected by public transportation from Salem, Erode, Dindigul, Oddanchatram, Madurai, Namakkal, Karur, Hosur, Bangalore.

== Politics ==
Vedasandur assembly constituency is part of Karur (Lok Sabha constituency). The current MLA is Ganthirajan S
