= Kallikulam =

- village
- Location in Tamil Nadu, India Kallikulam (India)
- Coordinates: 8.3546°N 77.6643°E
- Country: India
- State: Tamil Nadu
- District: Tirunelveli

Government
  - Body: Panchayat

Population
  - Total: 7,500

Languages
  - Official: Tamil
- Time zone: UTC+5:30 (IST)
- PIN: 627113
- Telephone code: 91 4637
- Nearest city: Tirunelveli
- Lok Sabha constituency: Tirunelveli
- Vidhan Sabha constituency: Radhapuram
- Civic agency: Panchayat
- Website: www.panimatha.com

South Kallikulam is a panchayat village located in Tirunelveli district in the Indian state of Tamil Nadu. The village is famous for the Our Lady of Snow church located at the heart of the Terku (South) Kallikulam. It is also the base for the Tirunelveli Dakshina Mara Nadar Sangam College

== History ==
The history of South Kallikulam extends up to the early 18th century. It is believed that the first inhabitants of Kallikulam had migrated from some southern part to the current village location. It was an unoccupied arid land till the first occupants moved here to start a living by farming. They built a temple for Sudalai Madan, a Hindu deity worshiped in the Tamil Nadu. There were a lot of disputes over the ownership of the land of the village. Over the time of period new families started to move here from surrounding places.

In 1770, a thatched church was built in the name of Holy Mary by the village people with the help from the priest from Vadakkankulam, a town located about 15 km south to Kallikulam. During 1885, snowfall occurred in the centre of the village and people believed that it was because of Holy Mary. Subsequently, the church was built up as a permanent structure with very good design during 1885 after the great miracle.

== Geography ==
South Kallikulam is located at 8.354°N 77.664°E which is very southern part of the South India peninsula. It is located about 6 km east to Valliyur on the route to Tiruchendur in Indian state highway (SH) - 93. The nearest pivotal towns are: Valliyur to the west, Thisayanvilai to the east, Tiruchendur to the northeast, Nagercoil to the southwest.

== Religion ==
South Kallikulam has a rich heritage of a diverse group of religions. Despite not having a large crowd of people in the village, there are people who practice the major religions of India: Hinduism, Christianity and Islam. Even though it has different religion practitioners, those of Roman Catholic are predominant in Kallikulam. It has four Roman Catholic churches, a mosque and Hindu temples. Each church has different patron saints in which the Our Lady of Snows church located in the center of the village is very famous around the place for its significant history behind.

== Our Lady of Snows Church ==
The Church of Our Lady of Snow is a Roman Catholic Marian church in Kallikulam, Tirunelveli district, Tamil Nadu, India. It is one of the Catholic pilgrimage centers in India dedicated to the Blessed Virgin Mary. This Church has tallest tower among Churches in India with very good engineering structure. this church is maintained by Nadar community of Kalli Kulam. In recent times it became popular because of vision and apparition of Mother Mary. Locally, Our Lady of Snow is known as Panimatha (Tamil: பனிமாதா). Panimatha is a Tamil word. In Tamil 'Pani (பனி)' means 'Snow' and 'Matha (மாதா)' means 'Mother'.

Every year, the annual feast of Our Lady of Snow is celebrated from 27 July to 5 August. The feast starts with a flag hoisting ceremony on 27 July in the evening. But surprisingly, along with Christians also other people worship in this church. A flag with Our Lady of Snow's image is raised up the flagpole (Tamil: கொடிமரம்) situated just opposite to the church. On the 7th day of the feast, in the morning, a special mass is conducted on the Apparition Hill. On the 9th day, at night, a car procession is conducted. Three very large cars participate in the procession. Our Lady of Snow's statue is placed in a Car and taken through the village streets. On the 10th day of the feast, at 6.00 am, the car procession comes to an end and the cars are parked near the church for worship. Then a celebratory mass honoring Our Lady of Snow is conducted. The feast comes to end with the evening novena on the 10th day.

A number of miracles occurred in this Church. If we pray Our Lady of Snow with faith, we could get good health, wealth and peace.

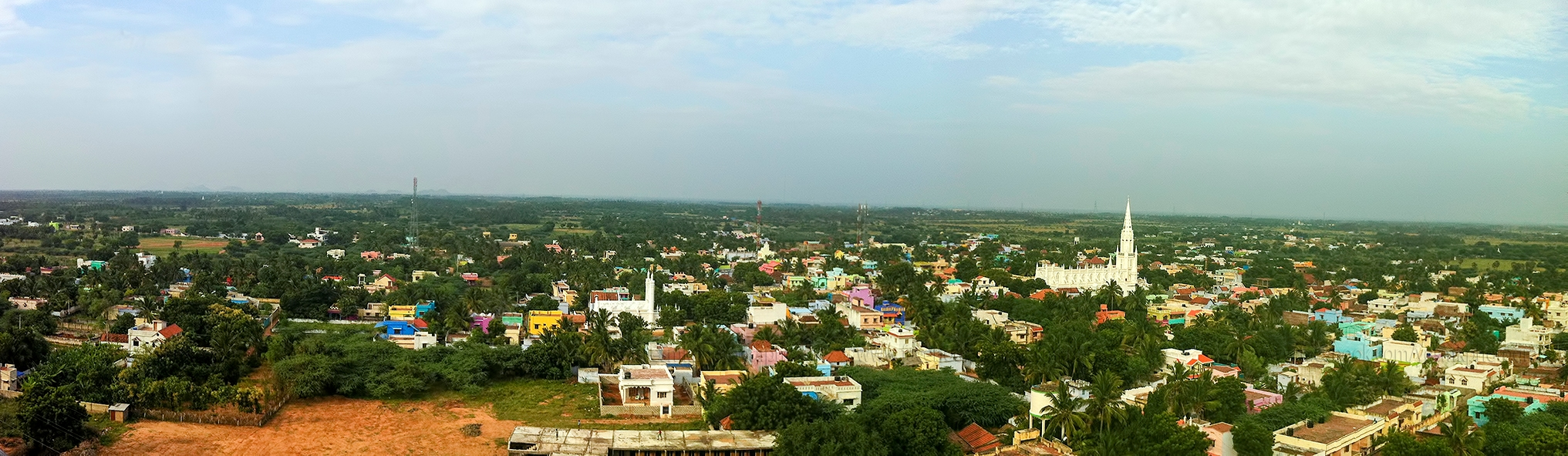
View of T. Kallikulam at South Kallikulam
