= St. Arockiya Nathar Church, Vavathurai =

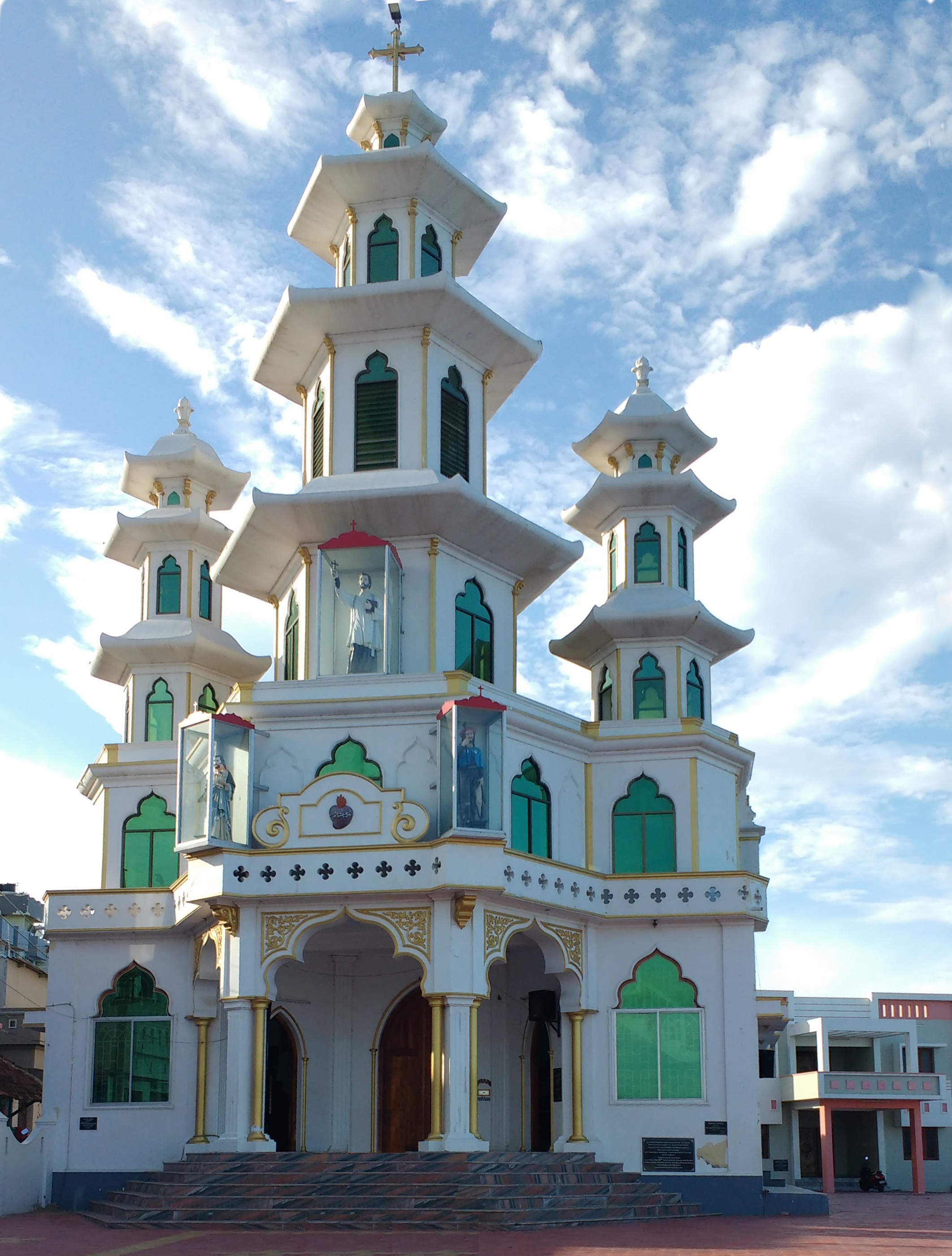
St.Arockiya Nathar Church. A great church (retouched).

St. Arockiya Nathar Church, Vavathurai is a Catholic church located in Vavathurai, Kanyakumari, India.

== Photo Gallery : Kanyakumari and Around ==
Kanyakumari and Places Around

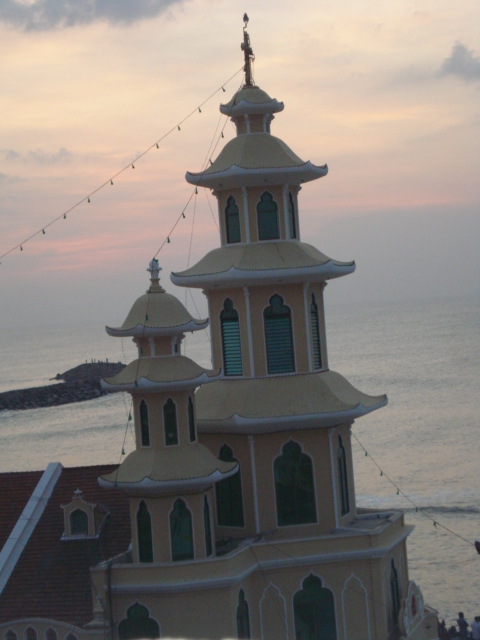
St.Arockiya Nathar Church Tower

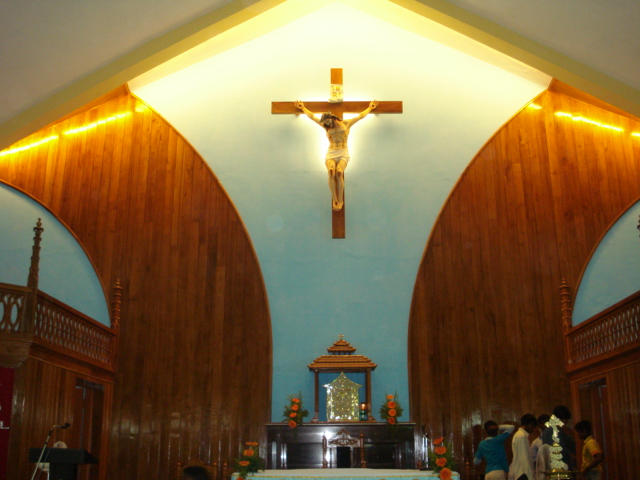
St.Arockiya Nathar Church Altar

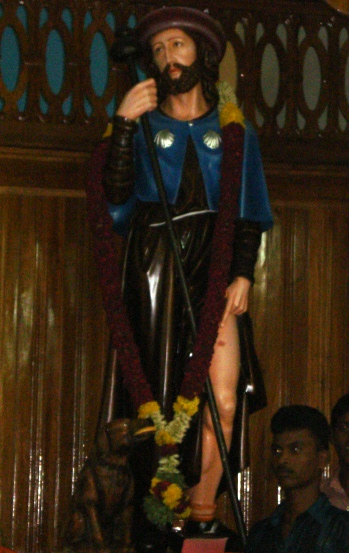
St.Arockiya Nathar

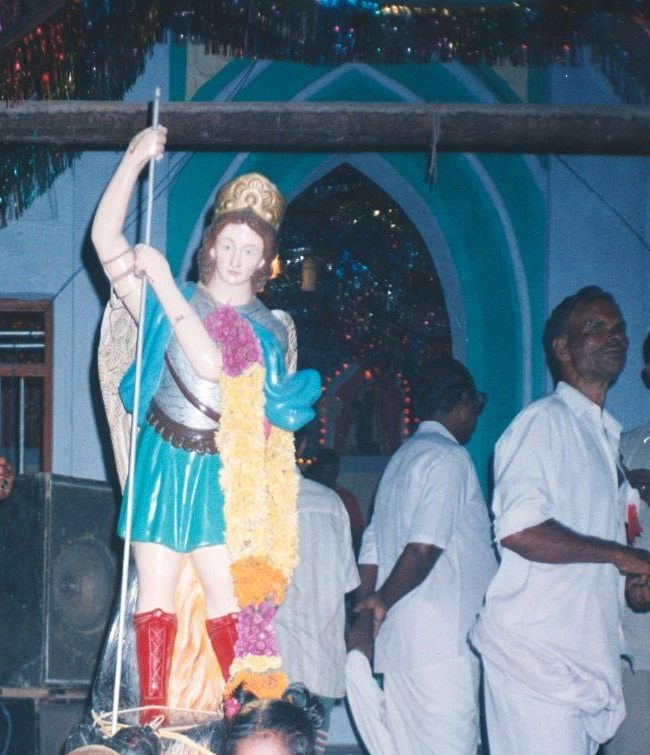
St.Michael's Statue of the Church

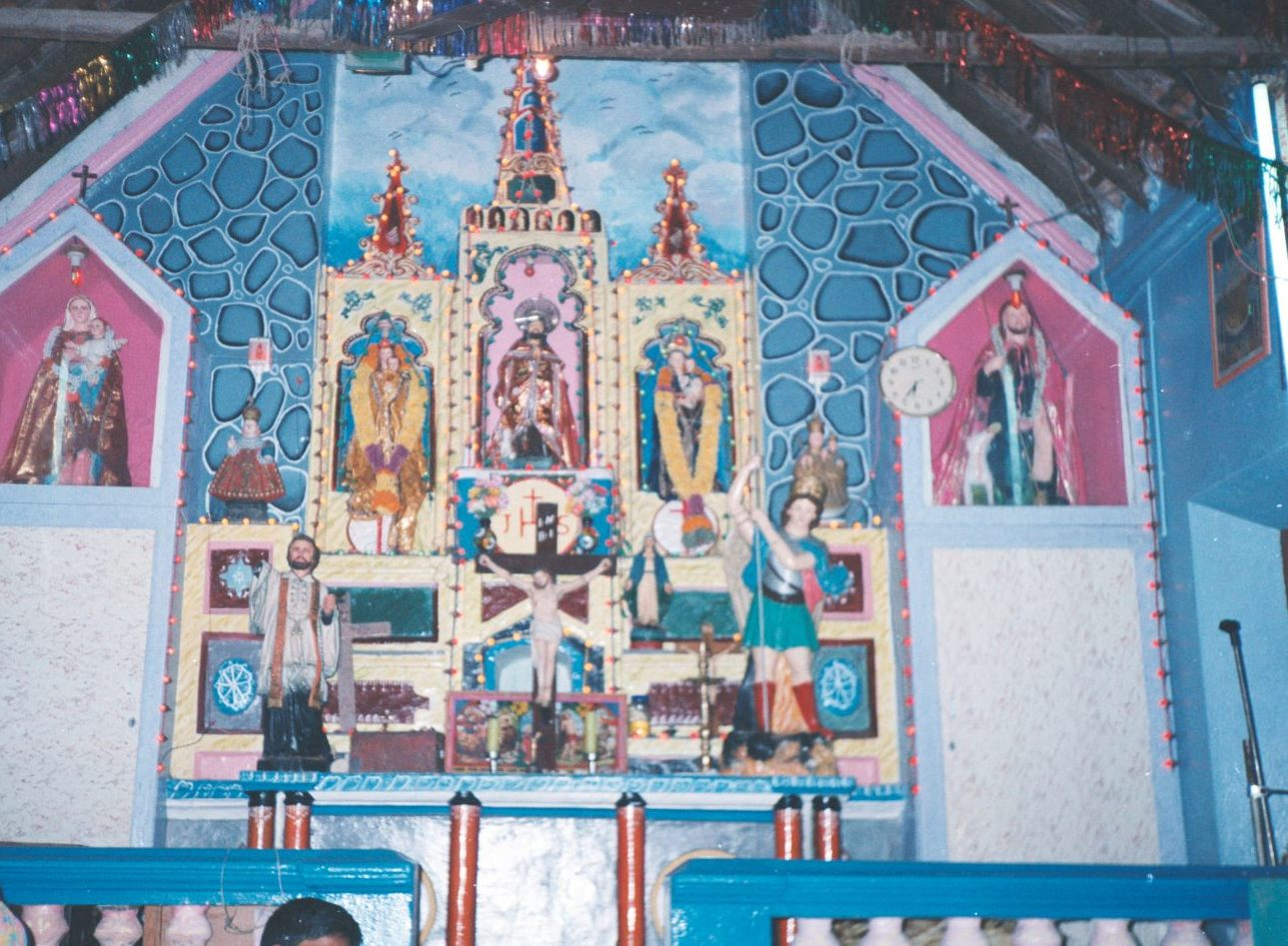
Old St.Arockiya Nathar Church Altar

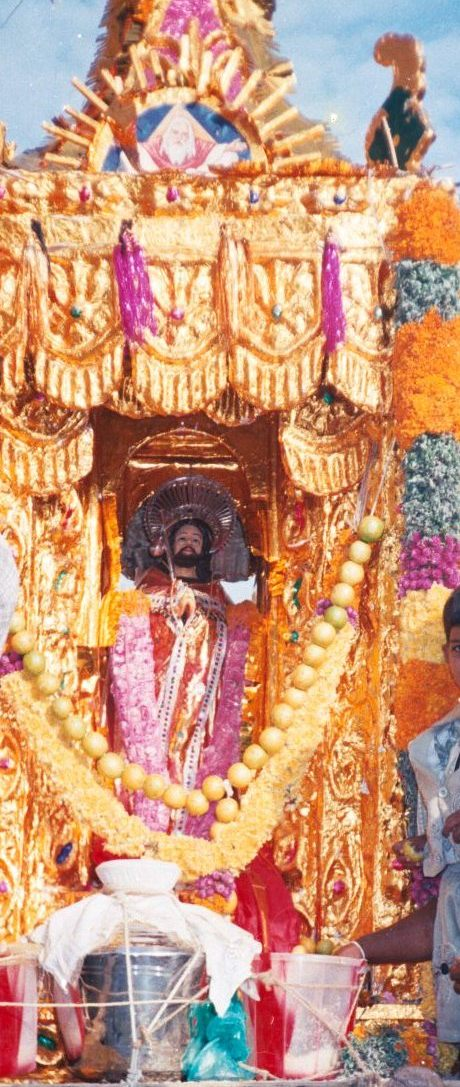
St.Arockiya Nathar's Car

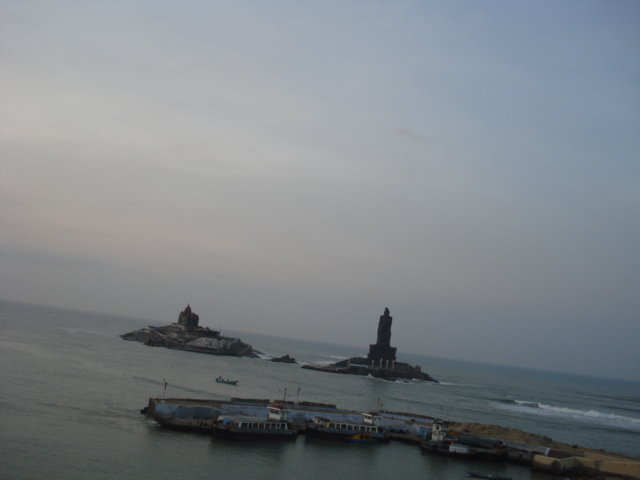
View of Vivekananda Rock Memorial from the Church

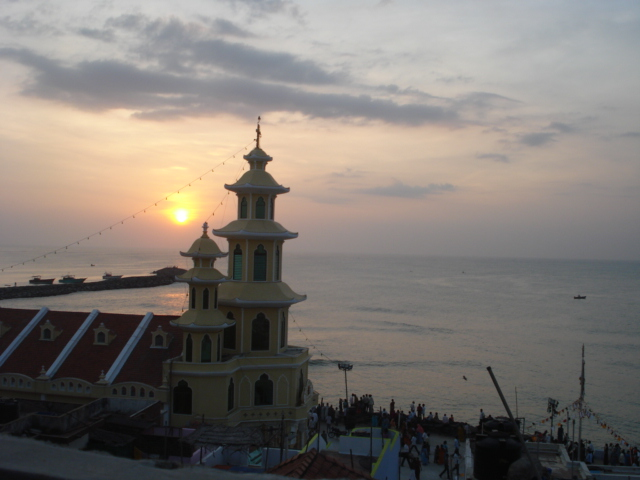
Sun Rise

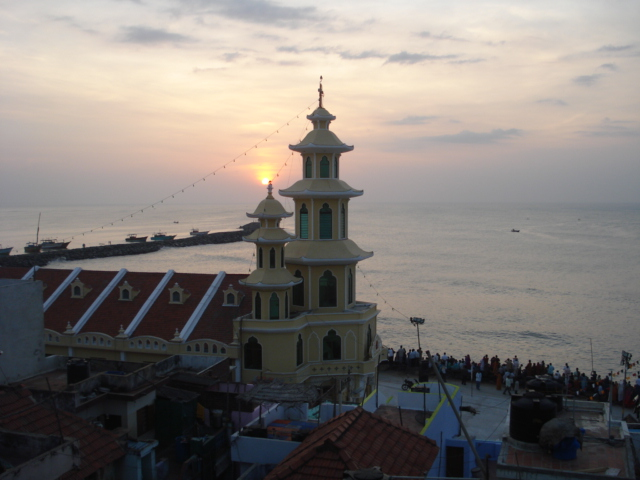
Sun Rise
