= Our Lady of Rosary Church, Kallakurichi =

Our Lady of Rosary Church
- Our Lady of Rosary Church, Kallakurichi
- Our Lady of Rosary Church
- Location: Kallakurichi, Tamil Nadu
- Country: India
- Denomination: Roman Catholic

History
- Former name: Kallakurichi Madha kovil
- Founded: 1914

Architecture
- Functional status: Active

Administration
- District: Villupuram
- Province: Tamil Nadu
- Diocese: Salem & Pondichery
- Parish: Kallakurichi

Our Lady of Rosary Church is a Roman Catholic, Kallakurichi, situated in Villupuram district, Tamil Nadu, India. Our Lady of Rosary Church, Kallakurichi has been recognized as a Parish under Diocese of Pondicherry.

== History ==
It was developed and built in the 19th century by Society of Foreign Missions of Paris Priests.

Rev. Fr. Louee Hedan laid base for the Kallakurichi Parish in 1914.

Then the old Church came to its existence in 1936 as a result of the efforts of Rev. Fr. Pere Di Elbreil, MEP Priest. Rev. Fr. PERE DI Elbreil, better known as Elbariel, was a MEP Priest, Philosopher and Philanthropist from France widely acknowledged as a social Reformer during the 1940s. He is still remembered for the schools, Convents, Churches constructed by him in and around Kallakurichi taluk along with S.V.S.Rathinam a Philontherapist. He arrived Pondicherry diocese, 22 May 1935. He had chosen Kallakurichi taluk to start his religious and social service. He constructed more than seven convents, three orphanages and schools. (Ulagankathan, Chinna salem, Siruvathur, Nariyappanur, Valli mathuram, Akara kottalam ...) Chinasalem was separated from Kallakurichi Parish in 1937. He released more than two hundred families from bonded slavery. Rev. Fr.PERE DElbreil baptised more than Ten thousand people to catholic Christian community around kallakurichi and virudhachalam taluk along with his disciples. He converted more than Ten thousand people into christianity from various areas. He compiled Dramas in English and Tamil. Yesuvin Paadugal, Christ and Me compiled by Rev. Fr.PERE DI Elbreil left India on 17 January 1947. He demised in Montabon, on 10 November 1988. It was a Golden Period of Kallakurichi Parish.

Rev. Fr. Gnamanikam built the new school building.

Rev. Fr. Gnadikkam demolished the old cemetery and constructed the St. Consega Convent.

Rev. Fr. Masilamani constructed the New Chappel.

Rev. Fr. Antony samy co-ordinated the public for the construction of the new cemetery.

Rev. Fr. Dhumma finalized the New cemetery place nearby the Manimutharu river.

Rev. Fr. Arokia samy constructed the Gebi, New School building and shopping complex.

Rev. Fr. Maria Joseph and Rev. Fr. Joshuva modified the complex and laid few statues.

Rev. Fr, L. Joseph Raj renovated the Church dooms at the time of the Centenary celebration.

== See also ==
- Roman Catholicism in India
- Christianity in India
- Christianity in Tamil Nadu
