= Zaba, Democratic Republic of the Congo =

Zaba
- Location in Democratic Republic of the Congo
- Coordinates: 4°19′52″S 18°14′45″E
- Country: Democratic Republic of the Congo
- Province: Kwilu

Zaba is a community in Kwilu province, Democratic Republic of the Congo (DRC).
