= Fatima Church, Kolkata =

Fatima Parish, Kolkata
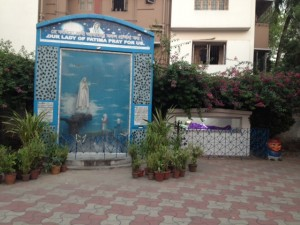
- Fatima Church, Kolkata
- Fatima Parish, Kolkata
- 22°33′15.39″N 88°22′18.68″E
- Location: Entally, Kolkata, West Bengal
- Country: India
- Denomination: Catholic
- Website: Official Website

History
- Status: Parish Church
- Founded: 5 January 1966

Specifications
- Capacity: 500

Administration
- District: Kolkata
- Archdiocese: Kolkata

Clergy
- Archbishop: Thomas D'Souza
- Priest: Fr. Francis Mukul Mondal

Fatima Church is a Catholic religious building located on CIT Road, Kolkata, India. Looked after by the Redemptorist fathers since 1966 the Fatima church serves the Catholic community living in and around CIT Road, Entally, Park Circus and nearby surrounding areas. It was erected into a parish in 1969.

== History ==
On 4 August 1951, the Archbishop of Calcutta Ferdinand Perier gave permission to Jesuit Father Julian Henry (of St Teresa's parish) to acquire a piece of land for the construction of a place of worship in the area. Devotion to our Lady of Fatima was started by Fr Henry S.J. and the chapel was known as 'Fatima shrine'. Regular processions to Fatima Shrine were organized from St. Teresa's church.

On 7 November 1965, two Redemptorist Fathers, G. Morgan and Daniel O’Callaghan came to Calcutta and formed the first Redemptorist Community. They took over the shrine and centre on 1 January 1966. It was canonically erected a parish on 5 January 1969. On 5 January 1966, Fatima Church was erected as a parish and officially handed over to the redemptorist community.

== Personality ==
40 year old Judith D'Souza who was recently kidnapped in Afghanistan belongs to this parish.

== Priests to Serve ==
Parish Priest to Serve Fatima Parish:

- Fr Daniel O’ Callaghan
- Fr Eric Rodrigues
- Fr G Morgan
- Fr Patrick Romeo D’Souza
- Fr Devasia Mangalam
- Fr George Enaickal
- Fr Ivo Fernandes
- Fr John Babu Haldar
- Fr Francis Satish Makhal
- Fr Devasia Mangalam
- Fr John Babu Haldar
- Fr Francis Mukul Mondal
- Fr Amar Bagh
- Fr Francis Satish Makhal (Current)

== Areas served ==
- Entally
- Philips
- CIT Road
- Park Circus
- Darga Road
