= St. Lazarus' Church, Chennai =

Church in Chennai, India

Coordinates: 13.026112°N 80.274278°E

St. Lazarus' Church, presently known as the Church of Our Lady of Guidance, is a Christian church in the city of Chennai in Tamil Nadu, India. It was constructed by the Portuguese in the 16th century AD.

== History ==
The Lazarus Church was constructed by the Portuguese in the colony of Sao Tome de Meliapore in the 16th century AD. The oldest records of the church date from 1582. The church was rebuilt in 1637 by the Madeiros family and again, in 1928. In 1952, the Church was renamed as the "Church of Our Lady of Guidance".
