= Antonysamy Savarimuthu =

Roman Catholic priest in Tamil Nadu, India

His Grace Most Reverend Monsignor Antonysamy Savarimuthu
- Metropolitan Archbishop of Madurai
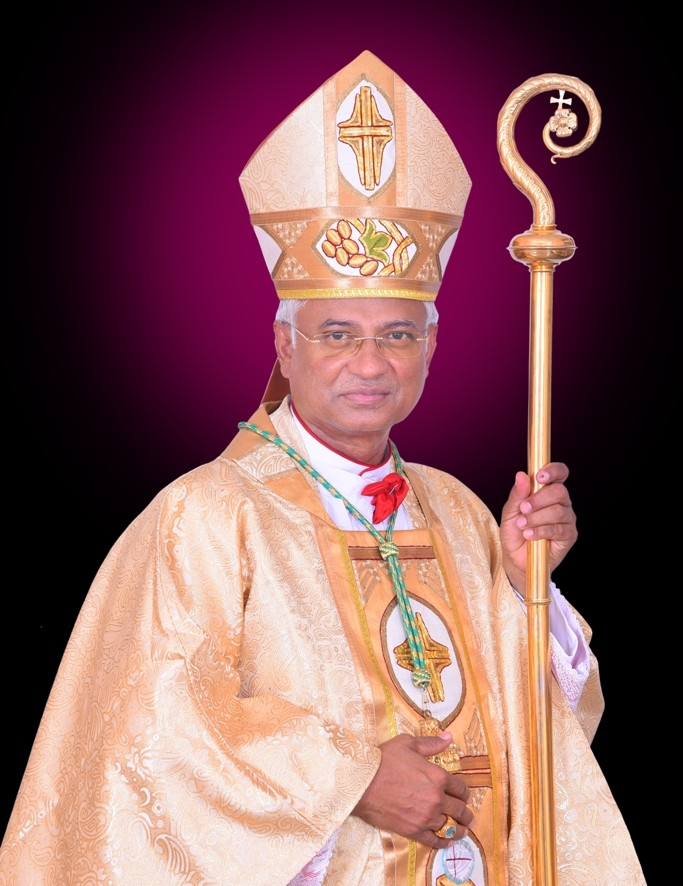
- Archbishop Mons. Antonysamy
- Church: Latin Rite
- Archdiocese: Madurai
- Appointed: 05 July 2025
- Installed: 02 August 2025
- Predecessor: Antony Pappusamy

Orders
- Ordination: 26 April 1987
- Consecration: 15 December 2019 by Antony Pappusamy

Personal details
- Born: 8 December 1960 (age 65) Tamil Nadu, India
- Occupation: Bishop
- Education: Institut Catholique de Paris

Mons. Antonysamy Savarimuthu is a Metropolitan Archbishop of The Metropolitan Archdiocese of Madurai since July 2025 and previously Bishop of the Catholic Diocese of Palayamkottai, Tamil Nadu, India from 2019 to 2025. He was born on 8 December 1960 in Vadaku Vandalam of the Diocese of Palayamkottai.

== Formation and Education ==
He studied his initiation course in St Peter's Minor Seminary, Madurai. He pursued his philosophical and theological formation in St Peter's Pontifical Seminary, Bangalore from 1979 to 1987. He was ordained a priest on 26 April 1987. He also holds a Licentiate and Doctorate in Canon Law from Institut Catholique de Paris from 1992 to 2000.

== Ministry ==
After his sacerdotal ordination, he served Bishop Iruthayaraj as his secretary from 1987 to 1989. He served as a formator and lecturer in St Peter's Seminary from 1989-1992. He was appointed Rector in Christ Hall Seminary, Madurai (2000–2004). He served the diocese in various capacities: Vicar General (2004–2011) Parish Priest of Infant Jesus Shrine, Shantinagar (2005–2009), Rector of St Mary's Minor Seminary and the Vocation Promoter of the Diocese, and Rector of the shrine of San Guida. From 2011, he was a professor of Canon Law in St Peter's Pontifical Institute, Bangalore and was the Dean of the Faculty of Canon Law till the announcement as Bishop-Elect of the Diocese of Palayamkottai.

== Bishop Elect ==
Pope Francis appointed him the third Bishop of the Diocese of Palayamkottai on 20 November 2019 and his episcopal consecration took place on 15 December 2019. on 4 November 2024 Pope Francis appointed him as The Apostolic Administrator of The Metropolitan Archdiocese of Madurai After The Retirement Of archbishop Antony Pappusamy On 5 July 2025 Pope Leo XIV Appointment Him as The Seventh Archbishop Of Madurai he installed on 2 August 2025.On 3 August 2026 He was appointed as apostolic administrator of the doicese of dindigul
