= Archdiocese of Madurai =

Roman Catholic Archdiocese in Tamil Nadu, India

Coordinates: 9.9136°N 78.1257°E

Metropolitan Archdiocese of Madurai Archidioecesis Metropolitae Madhuraiensis மதுரை உயர்மறைமாவட்டம்
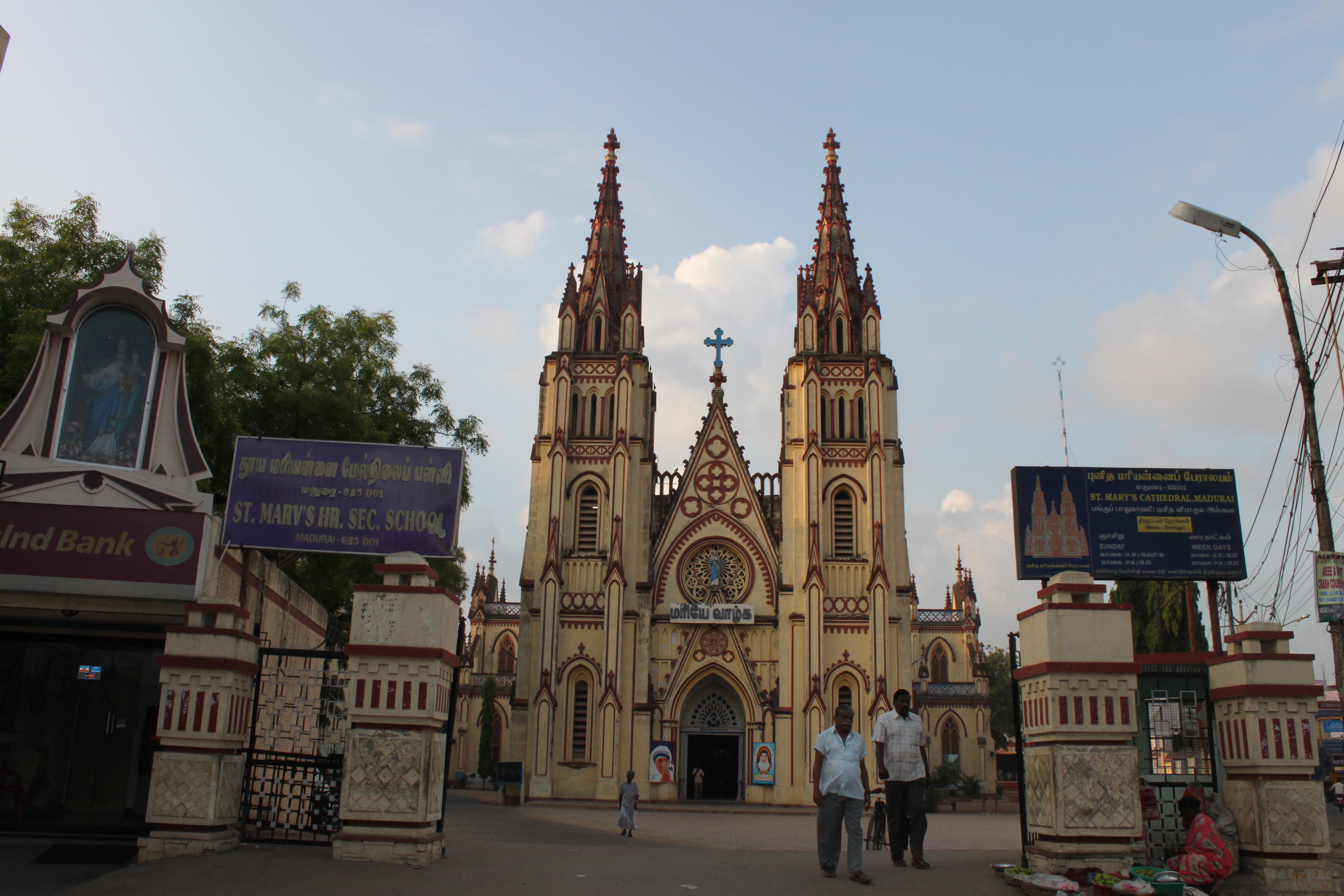
- Cathedral of St Mary in Madurai

Location
- Country: India
- Ecclesiastical province: Madurai

Statistics
- Area: 8,910 km^{2} (3,440 sq mi)
- Population: Total; Catholics: (as of 2014); 2,068,000; 145,000 (7%)
- Parishes: 77

Information
- Denomination: Catholic Church
- Sui iuris church: Latin Church
- Rite: Roman Rite
- Cathedral: Cathedral of Our Lady of Dolours (St. Mary's Cathedral) in Madurai
- Patron saint: St John de Brito

Current leadership
- Pope: Leo XIV
- Metropolitan Archbishop: Antonysamy Savarimuthu
- Vicar General: Jeyaraj J.
- Episcopal Vicars: John Diraviam M.
- Bishops emeritus: Anthony Pappusamy

Website
- Official website

The Metropolitan Archdiocese of Madurai (Latin: Madhuraien(sis)) is a Latin Church ecclesiastical jurisdiction or archdiocese of the Catholic Church. Its episcopal see is located in the city of Madurai, India.

== History ==
- 8 January 1938: Established as the Diocese of Madura from the Diocese of Trichinopoly
- 21 October 1950: Renamed as Diocese of Madurai
- 9 September 1953: Promoted as Metropolitan Archdiocese of Madurai

== Leadership ==
- Metropolitan Archbishops of Madurai
  - Antonysamy Savarimuthu

Apostolic Administrator:

(04 November 2024 - 05 July 2025)

Archbishop:

( 02 August 2025 – present)

  - Archbishop Antony Pappusamy

(24 August 2014 – 04 November 2024)

  - Archbishop Peter Fernando

(24 April 2003 – 24 August 2014)

  - Archbishop Marianus Arockiasamy

(28 August 1987 - 24 April 2003)

  - Archbishop Casimir Gnanadhikkam, S.J.

( 16 June 1985 - 25 March 1987)

  - Archbishop P.Justin Diraviam

(06 July 1967 - 16 June 1985)

  - Archbishop John Peter Leonard ,S.J.

(08 January 1938 - 06 July 1967)

== Suffragan dioceses ==
- Dindigul
- Kottar
- Kuzhithurai
- Palayamkottai
- Sivagangai
- Tiruchirapalli
- Tuticorin

== Gallery ==
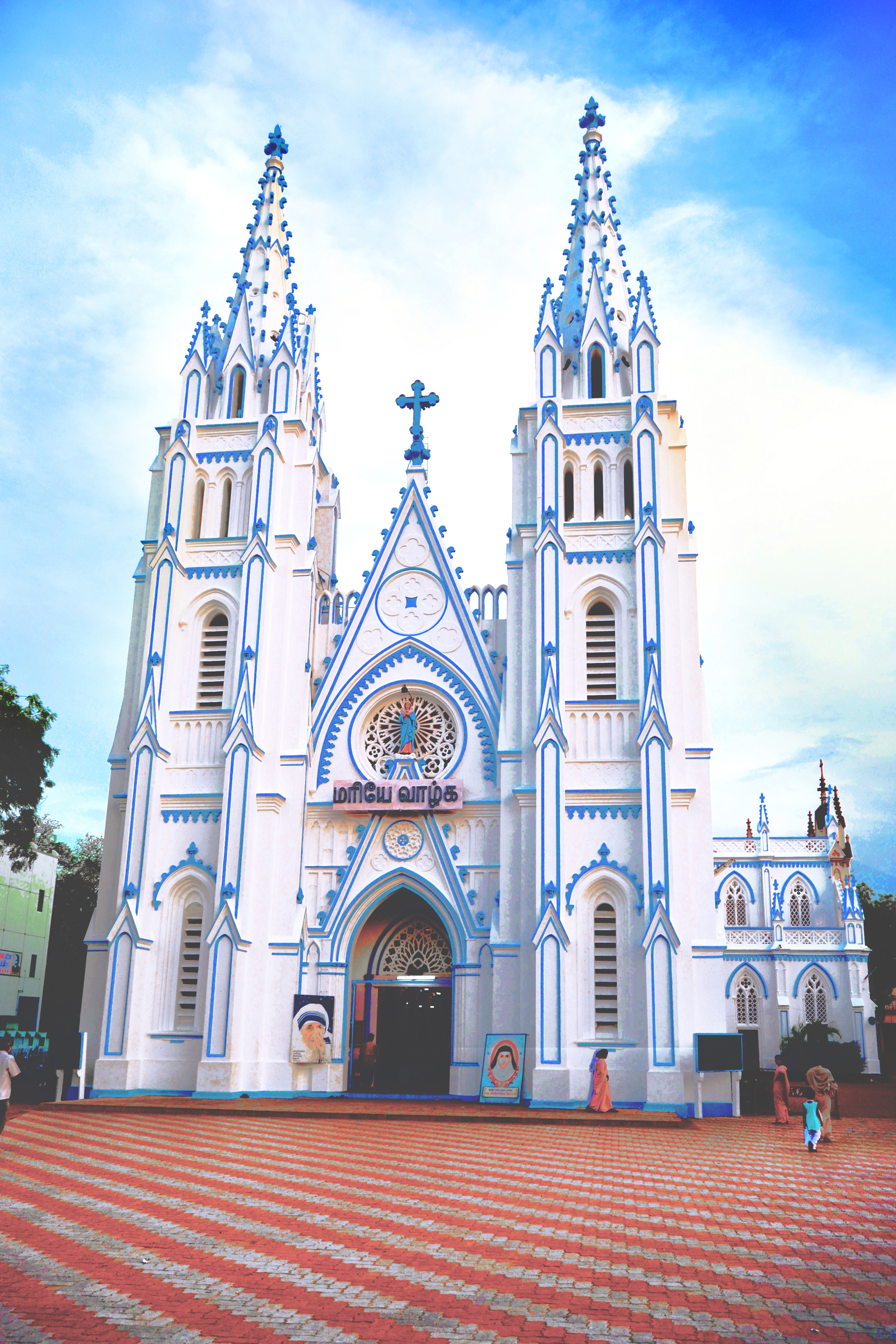
Front view of St Mary's Cathedral

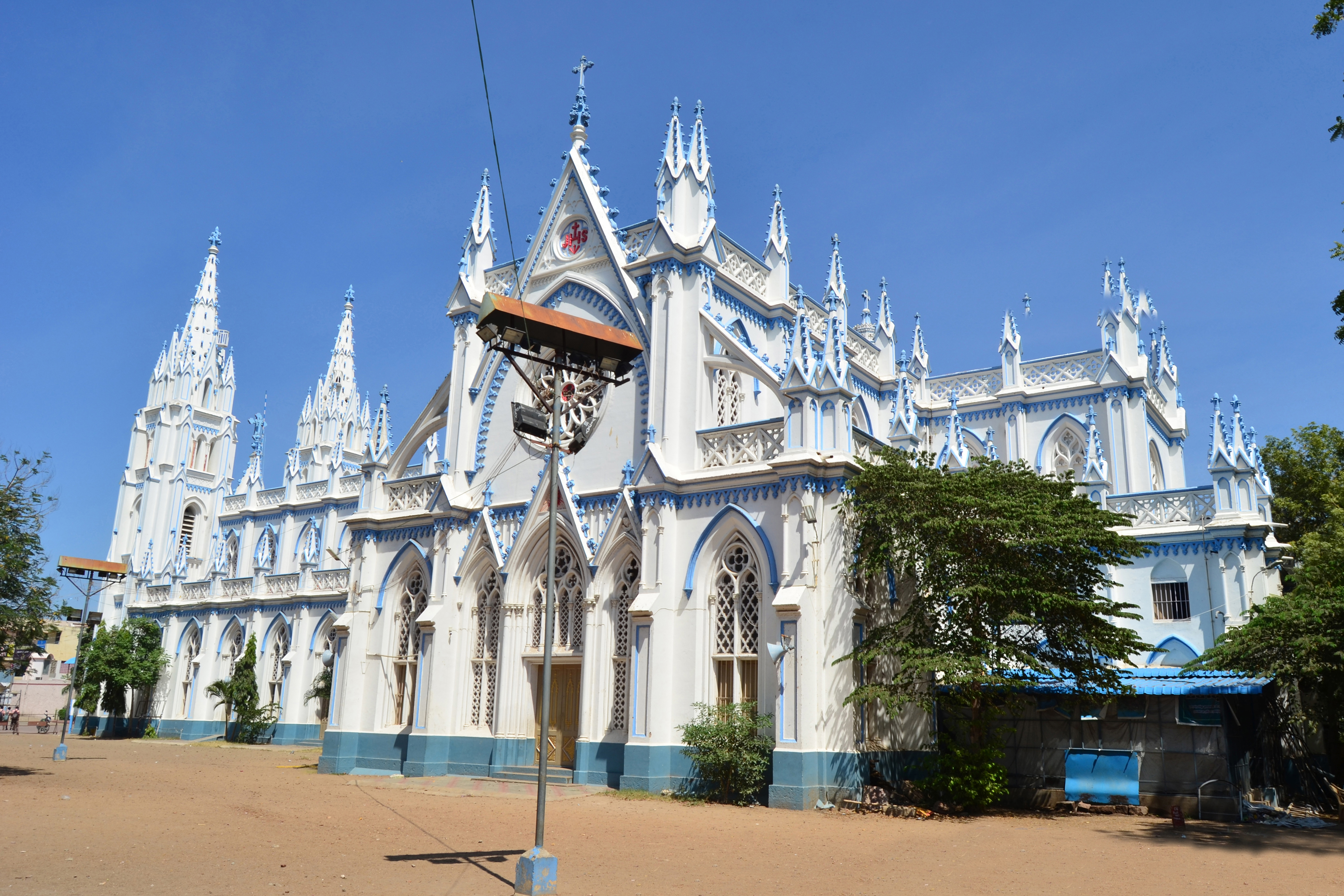
Side view

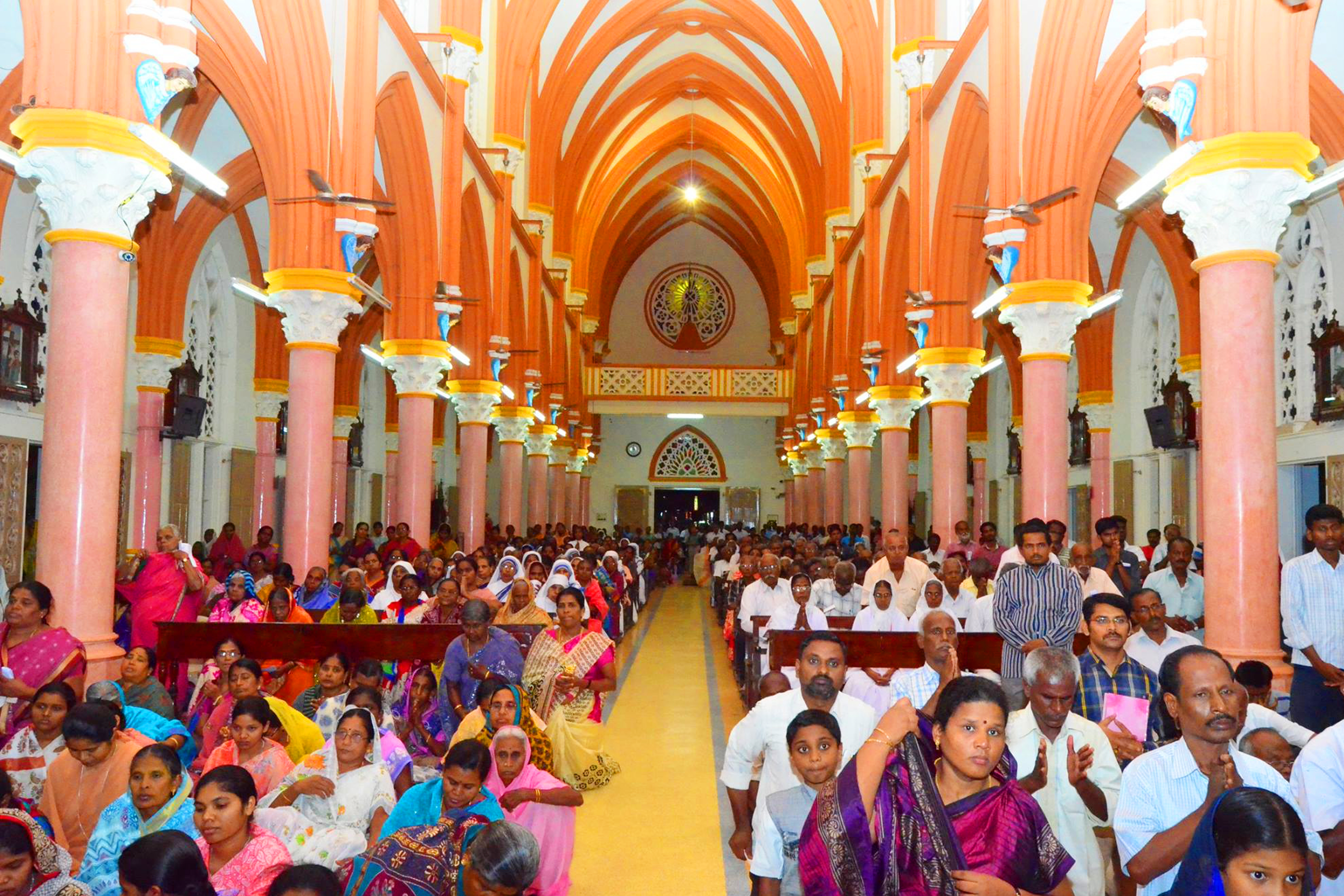
Inside view

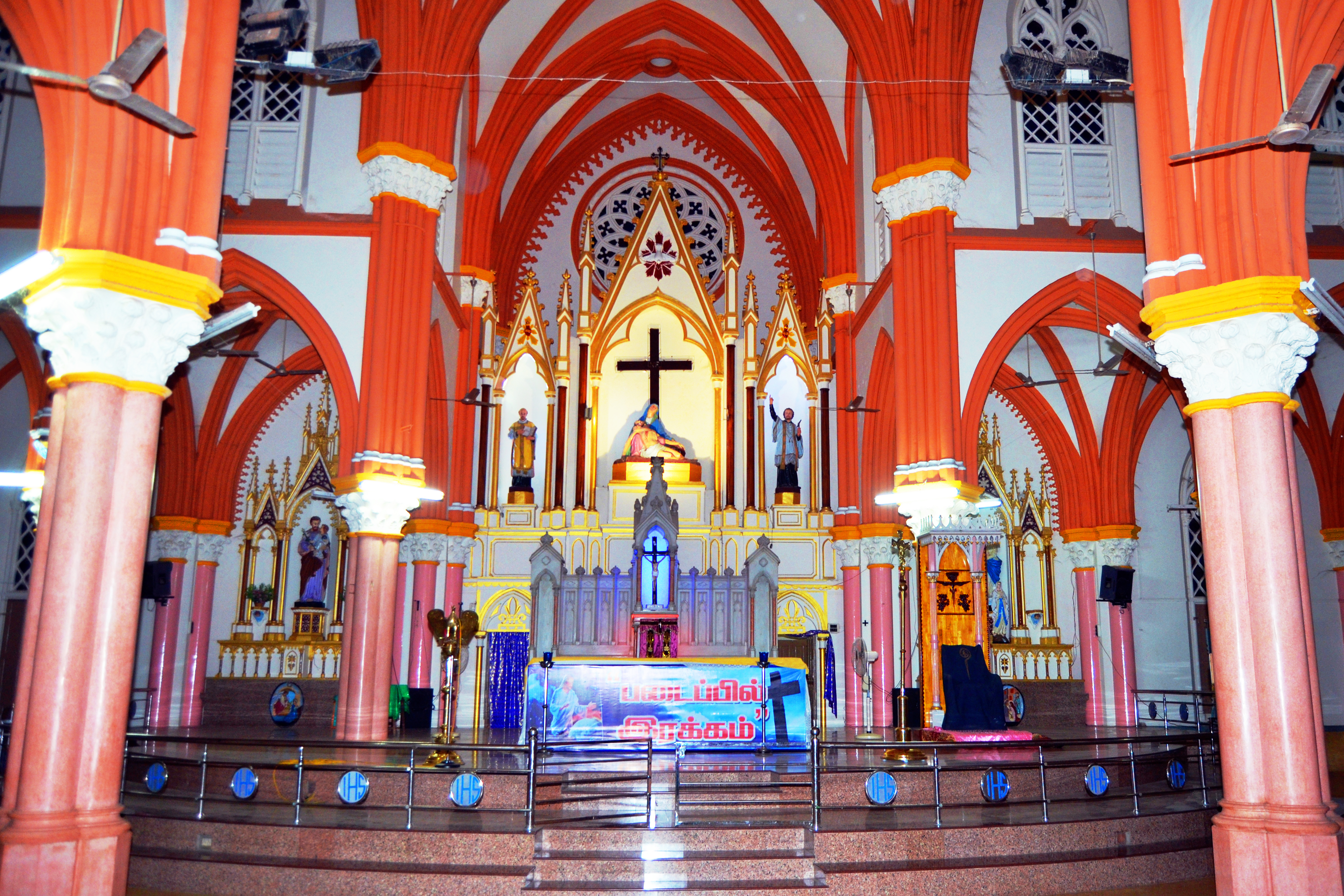
Main altar view
