= List of Catholic bishops in India =

The following is a list of living Catholic bishops of India sorted by ecclesiastical province and diocese. The bishops of India include two major archbishops, one each of the Syro-Malabar and the Syro-Malankara churches, and one of the four titular patriarchs of the Latin Church. There are 6 Indian cardinals, 4 of whom are electors. All the Catholic bishops of India are members of the Catholic Bishops Conference of India.

Latin rite provinces and dioceses of the Catholic church in India. The dioceses making up a province have different shades of the same colour

== Overview ==
A summary of the number of bishops in India: (Note: This summary does not include the Indian bishops serving abroad and the Nuncio. It was last updated on 12 November 2026.)

- Major archbishops: 2
- Titular patriarch: 1
- Metropolitan archbishops: 33
- Bishops: 133
- Bishops of curia: 1
- Coadjutor bishops: 3
- Auxiliary bishops: 26
- Archbishops/bishops emeriti: 89

Total: 288

- Cardinals: 6
  - Electors: 4
  - Non-electors: 2
- Vacant sees: 6
  - Apostolic administrators: 3
  - Diocesan administrators: 3

== Latin Catholic Provinces ==
=== Ecclesiastical Province of Agra ===
- Metropolitan Archbishop Raphy Manjaly of the Archdiocese of Agra
  - Metropolitan Archbishop emeritus Albert D'Souza of the Archdiocese of Agra
- Bishop John Carvalho of the Diocese of Ajmer
  - Bishop emeritus Pius Thomas D'Souza of the Diocese of Ajmer
  - Bishop emeritus Ignatius Menezes of the Diocese of Ajmer
- Bishop Louis Mascarenhas of the Diocese of Allahabad
- Bishop Ignatius D’Souza of the Diocese of Bareilly
- Bishop Joseph Kallarackal of the Diocese of Jaipur
  - Bishop emeritus Oswald Lewis of the Diocese of Jaipur
- Bishop Wilfred Gregory Moras of the Diocese of Jhansi
  - Bishop emeritus Peter Parapullil of the Diocese of Jhansi
- Bishop Gerald John Mathias of the Diocese of Lucknow
- Bishop Bhaskar Jesuraj of the Diocese of Meerut
- Fr. Marcus Garacia, diocesan administrator of the (vacant) Diocese of Udaipur
- Bishop Eugene Joseph of the Diocese of Varanasi

=== Ecclesiastical Province of Bangalore ===
- Metropolitan archbishop Peter Machado of the Archdiocese of Bangalore
  - Auxiliary bishop Arokia Raj Satis Kumar of the Archdiocese of Bangalore
  - Auxiliary bishop Joseph Sosainathan of the Archdiocese of Bangalore
  - Metropolitan archbishop emeritus Bernard Moras of the Archdiocese of Bangalore
- Bishop Derek Fernandes of the Diocese of Belgaum
- Bishop Henry D'Souza of the Diocese of Bellary
- Bishop Anthony Swamy Thomasappa of the Diocese of Chikmagalur
- Bishop Robert Michael Miranda of the Diocese of Gulbarga
- Bishop Duming Dias of the Diocese of Karwar
- Bishop Peter Paul Saldanha of the Diocese of Mangalore
  - Bishop emeritus Aloysius Paul D'Souza of the Diocese of Mangalore
- Bishop Francis Serrao, SJ of the Diocese of Mysore
  - Bishop emeritus Kannikadass William Antony of the Diocese of Mysore
  - Bishop emeritus Thomas Vazhapilly of the Diocese of Mysore
- Bishop Duming Dias, apostolic administrator of the (vacant) Diocese of Shimoga
- Bishop Leslie Clifford D’Souza of the Diocese of Udupi
  - Bishop emeritus Gerald Isaac Lobo of the Diocese of Udupi

=== Ecclesiastical Province of Bhopal ===
- Metropolitan Archbishop Alangaram Arockia Sebastian Durairaj, SVD of the Archdiocese of Bhopal
  - Metropolitan Archbishop emeritus Leo Cornelio, SVD of the Archdiocese of Bhopal
- Bishop Joseph Thykkattil of the Diocese of Gwalior
  - Bishop emeritus Joseph Kaithathara of the Diocese of Gwalior
- Bishop Thomas Mathew Kuttimackal of the Diocese of Indore
  - Bishop emeritus Chacko Thottumarickal, SVD of the Diocese of Indore
- Bishop Jesu Gaspar Valan Arasu of the Diocese of Jabalpur
  - Bishop emeritus Gerald Almeida of the Diocese of Jabalpur
- Bishop Peter Rumal Kharadi of the Diocese of Jhabua
- Bishop Augustine Madathikunnel of the Diocese of Khandwa

=== Ecclesiastical Province of Bombay ===
- Metropolitan archbishop John Rodrigues of the Archdiocese of Bombay
  - Auxiliary bishop Dominic Savio Fernandes of the Archdiocese of Bombay
  - Auxiliary bishop Stephen Eustace Victor Fernandes of the Archdiocese of Bombay
  - Cardinal Oswald Gracias, Metropolitan Archbishop emeritus of the Archdiocese of Bombay
  - Auxiliary Bishop emeritus Bosco Penha of the Archdiocese of Bombay
  - Auxiliary Bishop emeritus Percival Joseph Fernandez of the Archdiocese of Bombay
  - Auxiliary Bishop emeritus Allwyn D'Silva of the Archdiocese of Bombay
  - Auxiliary bishop emeritus Agnelo Rufino Gracias of the Archdiocese of Bombay [Was also the former Apostolic Adimistrator of Jalandhar]
- Bishop Barthol Barretto of the Diocese of Nashik
  - Bishop emeritus Lourdes Daniel of the Diocese of Nashik
- Bishop Simon Almeida of the Diocese of Poona
  - Bishop emeritus Thomas Dabre of the Diocese of Poona
- Bishop Thomas D'Souza of the Diocese of Vasai
  - Archbishop ad personam emeritus Felix Anthony Machado of the Diocese of Vasai

=== Ecclesiastical Province of Calcutta ===
- Metropolitan archbishop Elias Frank of the Archdiocese of Calcutta
  - Metropolitan archbishop emeritus Thomas D'Souza of the Archdiocese of Calcutta
- Metropolitan archbishop Elias Frank, apostolic administrator of the (vacant) Diocese of Asansol
  - Bishop emeritus Cyprian Monis of the Diocese of Asansol
- Bishop Paul Simick of the Diocese of Bagdogra
- Bishop Shyamal Bose of the Diocese of Baruipur
  - Bishop emeritus Salvadore Lobo of the Diocese of Baruipur
- Bishop Stephen Lepcha of the Diocese of Darjeeling
  - Coadjutor bishop Edward Baretto of the Diocese of Darjeeling
- Bishop Fabian Toppo of the Diocese of Jalpaiguri
  - Bishop emeritus Clement Tirkey of the Diocese of Jalpaiguri
- Bishop Nirmol Vincent Gomes, SDB of the Diocese of Krishnagar
- Bishop Fulgence Aloysius Tigga of the Diocese of Raiganj

=== Ecclesiastical Province of Calicut ===
- Metropolitan Archbishop Varghese Chakkalakal of the Archdiocese of Calicut
- Bishop Alex Vadakumthala of the Diocese of Kannur
  - Auxiliary bishop Dennis Kuruppassery of the Diocese of Kannur
- Bishop Peter Abir Antonisamy of the Diocese of Sultanpet

=== Ecclesiastical Province of Cuttack-Bhubaneswar ===
- Metropolitan Archbishop John Barwa, SVD of the Archdiocese of Cuttack-Bhubaneswar
  - Auxiliary bishop Rabindra Kumar Ranasingh of the Archdiocese of Cuttack-Bhubaneswar
- Bishop Varghese Thottamkara, CM of the Diocese of Balasore
  - Bishop emeritus Thomas Thiruthalil, CM of the Diocese of Balasore
- Bishop Sarat Chandra Nayak of the Diocese of Berhampur
- Bishop Aplinar Senapati, CM of the Diocese of Rayagada
- Bishop Kishore Kumar Kujur of the Diocese of Rourkela
- Bishop Niranjan Sual Singh of the Diocese of Sambalpur
  - Bishop emeritus Lucas Kerketta, SVD of the Diocese of Sambalpur

=== Ecclesiastical Province of Delhi ===
- Metropolitan archbishop Anil Joseph Thomas Couto of the Archdiocese of Delhi
  - Auxiliary bishop Deepak Valerian Tauro of the Archdiocese of Delhi
  - Metropolitan archbishop emeritus Vincent Michael Concessao of the Archdiocese of Delhi
- Bishop Ivan Pereira of the Diocese of Jammu-Srinagar
- Bishop Jose Sebastian Thekkumcherikunnel of the Diocese of Jalandhar
  - Bishop emeritus Franco Mulakkal of the Diocese of Jalandhar
- Bishop Sahaya Thatheus Thomas of the Diocese of Simla and Chandigarh
  - Bishop emeritus Ignatius Loyola Mascarenhas of the Diocese of Simla and Chandigarh

=== Ecclesiastical Province of Gandhinagar ===
- Metropolitan archbishop Thomas Ignatius MacWan of the Archdiocese of Gandhinagar
  - Metropolitan archbishop emeritus Stanislaus Fernandes, SJ of the Archdiocese of Gandhinagar
- Bishop Athanasius Rethna Swamy Swamiadian of the Diocese of Ahmedabad
- Bishop Sebastiäo Mascarenhas, SFX of the Diocese of Baroda
  - Bishop emeritus Godfrey de Rozario, SJ of the Diocese of Baroda

=== Ecclesiastical Province of Goa and Daman ===
- Cardinal Filipe Neri Ferrao, Metropolitan Archbishop Patriarch of the Archdiocese of Goa and Daman (Note: The Archbishop of Goa and Daman also carries the title of the Patriarch of the East Indies.)
  - Auxiliary bishop Simião Purificação Fernandes of the Archdiocese of Goa and Daman
- Bishop Francisco Antonio Agnelo Jacinto Pinheiro of the Diocese of Sindhudurg
  - Bishop emeritus Anthony Alwyn Fernandes Barreto of the Diocese of Sindhudurg

=== Ecclesiastical Province of Guwahati ===
- Metropolitan Archbishop John Moolachira of the Archdiocese of Guwahati
  - Coadjutor archbishop Albert Hemrom of the Archdiocese of Guwahati
  - Metropolitan Archbishop emeritus Thomas Menamparampil, SDB of the Archdiocese of Guwahati
- Bishop Thomas Pulloppillil of the Diocese of Bongaigaon
- Fr. Philip Purty, diocesan administrator of the (vacant) Diocese of Dibrugarh
  - Bishop emeritus Joseph Aind, SDB of the Diocese of Dibrugarh
- Bishop Paul Mattekatt of the Diocese of Diphu
- Bishop Benny Varghese Edathattel of the Diocese of Itanagar
  - Bishop emeritus John Thomas Kattrukudiyil of the Diocese of Itanagar
- Bishop George Palliparambil, SDB of the Diocese of Miao
  - Auxiliary Bishop Dennis Panipitchai, SDB of the Diocese of Miao
- Bishop Michael Akasius Toppo of the Diocese of Tezpur

=== Ecclesiastical Province of Hyderabad ===
- Cardinal Anthony Poola, Metropolitan Archbishop of the Archdiocese of Hyderabad
- Bishop Paul Prakash Saginala of the Diocese of Cuddapah
  - Bishop emeritus Prasad Gallela of the Diocese of Cuddapah
- Bishop Prakash Sagili of the Diocese of Khammam
  - Bishop emeritus Paul Maipan of the Diocese of Khammam
- Bishop Johannes Gorantla, OCD of the Diocese of Kurnool
- Bishop Karnam Dhaman Kumar, MSFS of the Diocese of Nalgonda
  - Bishop emeritus Joji Govindu of the Diocese of Nalgonda
- Bishop Vijaya Paul Reddy Duggimpudi of the Diocese of Warangal

=== Ecclesiastical Province of Imphal ===
- Metropolitan archbishop Linus Neli of the Archdiocese of Imphal
  - Metropolitan archbishop emeritus Dominic Lumon of the Archdiocese of Imphal
- Bishop James Thoppil of the Diocese of Kohima
  - Bishop emeritus Jose Mukala of the Diocese of Kohima

=== Ecclesiastical Province of Madras and Mylapore ===
- Metropolitan archbishop George Antonysamy of the Archdiocese of Madras and Mylapore
  - Metropolitan Archbishop emeritus Malayappan Chinnappa, SDB of the Archdiocese of Madras and Mylapore
- Bishop Anthonisamy Neethinathan of the Diocese of Chingleput
- Bishop Lephonse Thomas Aquinas of the Diocese of Coimbatore
- Bishop Arulappan Amalraj of the Diocese of Ootacamund
- Bishop Ambrose Pitchaimuthu of the Diocese of Vellore

=== Ecclesiastical Province of Madurai ===
- Metropolitan archbishop Antonysamy Savarimuthu of the Archdiocese of Madurai
  - Metropolitan Archbishop-emeritus Antony Pappusamy of the Archdiocese of Madurai
- Metropolitan archbishop Antonysamy Savarimuthu, apostolic administrator of the (vacant) Diocese of Dindigul
  - Bishop emeritus Thomas Paulsamy of the Diocese of Dindigul
- Bishop Nazarene Soosai of the Diocese of Kottar
  - Bishop Emeritus Peter Remigius of the Diocese of Kottar
- Bishop Albert George Alexander Anastas of the Diocese of Kuzhithurai
- Fr. Motcharajan Michael, diocesan administrator of the (vacant) Diocese of Palayamkottai
  - Bishop Emeritus Jude Gerald Paulraj of the Diocese of Palayamkottai
- Bishop Lourdu Anandam of the Diocese of Sivagangai
  - Bishop Emeritus Jebalamai Susaimanickam of the Diocese of Sivagangai
- Bishop Savarimuthu Arokiaraj of the Diocese of Tiruchirapalli
- Bishop Stephen Antony Pillai of the Diocese of Tuticorin
  - Bishop Emeritus Yvon Ambroise of the Diocese of Tuticorin

=== Ecclesiastical Province of Nagpur ===
- Metropolitan Archbishop Elias Joseph Gonsalves of the Archdiocese of Nagpur
- Bishop Malcolm Sequeira of the Diocese of Amravati
- Bishop Bernard Lancy Pinto of the Diocese of Aurangabad
  - Bishop emeritus Bishop Ambrose Rebello of the Diocese of Aurangabad

=== Ecclesiastical Province of Patna ===
- Metropolitan Archbishop Sebastian Kallupura of the Archdiocese of Patna
  - Metropolitan Archbishop emeritus William D'Souza, SJ of the Archdiocese of Patna
- Bishop Peter Sebastian Goveas of the Diocese of Bettiah
- Bishop Kurien (Ciriaco) Valiakandathil of the Diocese of Bhagalpur
- Bishop James Shekhar of the Diocese of Buxar
- Bishop Cajetan Francis Osta of the Diocese of Muzaffarpur
  - Bishop emeritus John Baptist Thakur, SJ of the Diocese of Muzaffarpur
- Bishop Francis Tirkey of the Diocese of Purnea
  - Bishop emeritus Angelus Kujur, SJ of the Diocese of Purnea

=== Ecclesiastical Province of Pondicherry and Cuddalore ===
- Metropolitan Archbishop Francis Kalist of the Archdiocese of Pondicherry and Cuddalore
- Bishop Lawrence Pius Dorairaj of the Diocese of Dharmapuri
- Bishop Jeevanandam Amalanathan of the Diocese of Kumbakonam
  - Bishop emeritus Francis Antonysamy of the Diocese of Kumbakonam
- Bishop Arulselvam Rayappan of the Diocese of Salem
  - Bishop emeritus Sebastianappan Singaroyan of the Diocese of Salem
- Bishop Sagayaraj Thamburaj of the Diocese of Tanjore

=== Ecclesiastical Province of Raipur ===
- Metropolitan Archbishop Victor Henry Thakur of the Archdiocese of Raipur
  - Metropolitan Archbishop emeritus Joseph Augustine Charanakunnel of the Archdiocese of Raipur
- Bishop Antonis Bara of the Diocese of Ambikapur
  - Bishop emeritus Patras Minj, SJ of the Diocese of Ambikapur
- Bishop Emmanuel Kerketta of the Diocese of Jashpur
- Bishop Paul Toppo of the Diocese of Raigarh

=== Ecclesiastical Province of Ranchi ===
- Metropolitan archbishop Vincent Aind of the Archdiocese of Ranchi
  - Auxiliary bishop Anand David Xalxo of the Archdiocese of Ranchi
  - Metropolitan archbishop emeritus Felix Toppo, SJ of the Archdiocese of Ranchi
- Bishop Theodore Mascarenhas, SFX of the Diocese of Daltonganj
  - Bishop emeritus Gabriel Kujur, SJ of the Diocese of Daltonganj
- Bishop Julius Marandi of the Diocese of Dumka
  - Auxiliary bishop Sonatan Kisku of the Diocese of Dumka
- Bishop Linus Pingal Ekka of the Diocese of Gumla
- Bishop Jojo Anand of the Diocese of Hazaribag
- Bishop Telesphore Bilung, SVD of the Diocese of Jamshedpur
- Bishop Binay Kandulna of the Diocese of Khunti
- Bishop Visuvasam Selvaraj of the Diocese of Port Blair
  - Bishop emeritus Aleixo das Neves Dias, SFX of the Diocese of Port Blair [Residing in the Archdiocese of Goa and Daman]
- Bishop Vincent Barwa of the Diocese of Simdega

=== Ecclesiastical Province of Shillong ===
- Metropolitan Archbishop Victor Lyngdoh of the Archdiocese of Shillong
  - Auxiliary bishop Bernard Laloo of the Archdiocese of Shillong
- Bishop Lumen Monteiro, CSC of the Diocese of Agartala
- Bishop Stephen Rotluanga, CSC of the Diocese of Aizawl
  - Auxiliary bishop Joachim Walder of the Diocese of Aizawl
- Bishop Ferdinand Dkhar of the Diocese of Jowai
- Bishop Wilbert Marwein of the Diocese of Nongstoin
- Bishop Andrew Marak of the Diocese of Tura
  - Auxiliary bishop Jose Chirackal of the Diocese of Tura

=== Ecclesiastical Province of Thiruvananthapuram ===
- Metropolitan Archbishop Most Rev. Dr. Thomas J. Netto of the Archdiocese of Thiruvananthapuram
  - Metropolitan Archbishop emeritus Maria Callist Soosa Pakiam of the Archdiocese of Thiruvananthapuram
  - Auxiliary Bishop Christudas Rajappan of the Archdiocese of Thiruvananthapuram
- Bishop James Raphael Anaparambil of the Diocese of Alleppey
- Bishop Selvarajan Dasan of the Diocese of Neyyattinkara
  - Bishop-emeritus Vincent Samuel of the Diocese of Neyyattinkara
- Bishop Selvister Ponnumuthan of the Diocese of Punalur
- Bishop Paul Antony Mullassery of the Diocese of Quilon
  - Bishop emeritus Stanley Roman of the Diocese of Quilon

=== Ecclesiastical Province of Verapoly ===
- Metropolitan Archbishop Joseph Kalathiparambil of the Archdiocese of Verapoly
  - Auxiliary bishop Antony Valumkal of the Archdiocese of Verapoly
  - Metropolitan Archbishop emeritus Francis Kallarackal of the Archdiocese of Verapoly
- Bishop Antony Kattiparambil of the Diocese of Cochin
  - Bishop emeritus Joseph Kariyil of the Diocese of Cochin
  - Bishop emeritus John Thattumkal, SSC of the Diocese of Cochin
- Bishop Ambrose Puthenveettil of the Diocese of Kottapuram
  - Bishop emeritus Joseph Karikassery of the Diocese of Kottapuram
- Bishop Sebastian Thekethecheril of the Diocese of Vijayapuram
  - Auxiliary bishop Justin Alexander Madathiparambil of the Diocese of Vijayapuram

=== Ecclesiastical Province of Visakhapatnam ===
- Metropolitan archbishop Udumala Bala Showreddy of the Archdiocese of Visakhapatnam
- Bishop Jaya Rao Polimera of the Diocese of Eluru
- Bishop Bhagyaiah Chinnabathini of the Diocese of Guntur
  - Bishop emeritus Bali Gali of the Diocese of Guntur
- Bishop Doraboina Moses Prakasam of the Diocese of Nellore
  - Coadjutor bishop Anthony Das Pilli of the Diocese of Nellore
- Bishop Vijaya Kumar Rayarala, PIME of the Diocese of Srikakulam
- Bishop Joseph Raja Rao Thelegathoti, SMM of the Diocese of Vijayawada

== Syro-Malabar Ecclesiastical Provinces ==
=== Province of Eranakulam - Angamaly ===
- Major Archbishop Mar Raphael Thattil of the Syro-Malabar Catholic Archeparchy of Eranakulam-Angamaly
  - Archbishop Mar Joseph Pamplany, major archiepiscopal administrator of the Syro-Malabar Catholic Archeparchy of Eranakulam-Angamaly
  - Major Archbishop emeritus Cardinal Mar George Alencherry of the Syro-Malabar Catholic Archeparchy of Eranakulam-Angamaly
  - Archbishop ad personam Mar Antony Kariyil, CMI, major archiepiscopal vicar emeritus of the Syro-Malabar Catholic Archeparchy of Eranakulam-Angamaly
  - Auxiliary Bishop emeritus Mar Thomas Chakiath of the Syro-Malabar Catholic Archeparchy of Eranakulam-Angamaly
- Bishop Mar John Nellikunnel of the Syro-Malabar Catholic Eparchy of Idukki
- Bishop Mar George Madathikandathil of the Syro-Malabar Catholic Eparchy of Kothamangalam
  - Bishop emeritus Mar George Punnakottil of the Syro-Malabar Catholic Eparchy of Kothamangalam

=== Province of Changanassery ===
- Metropolitan Archbishop Mar Thomas Joseph Tharayil of the Syro-Malabar Catholic Archeparchy of Changanassery
  - Metropolitan archbishop emeritus Mar Joseph Perumthottam of the Syro-Malabar Catholic Archeparchy of Changanassery
- Bishop Mar Jose Pulickal of the Syro-Malabar Catholic Eparchy of Kanjirapally
  - Bishop emeritus Mar Mathew Arackal of the Syro-Malabar Catholic Eparchy of Kanjirapally
- Bishop Mar Joseph Kallarangatt of the Syro-Malabar Catholic Eparchy of Palai
  - Bishop emeritus Mar Joseph Pallikaparampil of the Syro-Malabar Catholic Eparchy of Palai
  - Auxiliary Bishop emeritus Mar Jacob Muricken of the Syro-Malabar Catholic Eparchy of Palai
- Bishop Mar George Rajendran Kuttinadar, SDB of the Syro-Malabar Catholic Eparchy of Thuckalay

=== Province of Faridabad ===
- Metropolitan Archbishop Mar Kuriakose Bharanikulangara of the Syro-Malabar Archeparchy of Faridabad
  - Auxiliary bishop Mar Jose Puthenveettil of the Syro-Malabar Archeparchy of Faridabad
- Bishop Mar Vincent Nellaiparambil of the Syro-Malabar Catholic Eparchy of Bijnor
  - Bishop emeritus Mar John Vadakel, CMI of the Syro-Malabar Catholic Eparchy of Bijnor
  - Bishop emeritus Mar Gratian Mundadan, CMI, Apostolic Visitor emeritus, Bishop emeritus of the Syro-Malabar Catholic Eparchy of Bijnor
- Bishop Mar Mathew Nellikunnel, CST of the Syro-Malabar Catholic Eparchy of Gorakhpur
  - Bishop emeritus Mar Thomas Thuruthimattam, CST of the Syro-Malabar Catholic Eparchy of Gorakhpur

=== Province of Kalyan ===
- Metropolitan Archbishop Mar Sebastian Vaniyapurackal of the Syro-Malabar Catholic Archeparchy of Kalyan
  - Bishop emeritus Mar Thomas Elavanal, MCBS of the Syro-Malabar Catholic Archeparchy of Kalyan
- Bishop Mar Ephrem Nariculam of the Syro-Malabar Catholic Eparchy of Chanda
  - Bishop emeritus Mar Vijay Anand Nedumpuram, CMI of the Syro-Malabar Catholic Eparchy of Chanda
- Bishop Mar Jose Chittooparambil, CMI of the Syro-Malabar Catholic Eparchy of Rajkot

=== Province of Shamshabad ===
- Metropolitan Archbishop Mar Antony Prince Panengaden of the Syro-Malabar Catholic Archeparchy of Shamshabad
  - Auxiliary bishop Mar Joseph Kollamparambil of the Syro-Malabar Catholic Archeparchy of Shamshabad
  - Auxiliary Bishop Mar Thomas Padiyath of the Syro-Malabar Catholic Archeparchy of Shamshabad
- Bishop Mar Joseph Thachaparambath, CMI of the Syro-Malabar Catholic Eparchy of Adilabad
  - Bishop emeritus Mar Joseph Kunnath, CMI of the Syro-Malabar Catholic Eparchy of Adilabad

=== Province of Tellicherry ===
- Metropolitan Archbishop Mar Joseph Pamplany of the Syro-Malabar Catholic Archeparchy of Tellicherry
  - Metropolitan Archbishop emeritus Mar George Njaralakatt of the Syro-Malabar Catholic Archeparchy of Tellicherry
  - Metropolitan Archbishop emeritus Mar George Valiamattam of the Syro-Malabar Catholic Archeparchy of Tellicherry
- Bishop Mar James Patteril, CMF of the Syro-Malabar Catholic Eparchy of Belthangady
  - Bishop emeritus Mar Lawrence Mukkuzhy of the Syro-Malabar Catholic Eparchy of Belthangady
- Bishop Mar Joseph Erumachadath, MCBS of the Syro-Malabar Catholic Eparchy of Bhadravathi
- Bishop Mar Jose Porunnedom of the Syro-Malabar Catholic Eparchy of Mananthavay
  - Auxiliary Bishop Mar Alex Tharamangalam of the Syro-Malabar Catholic Eparchy of Mananthavady
- Bishop Mar Remigiose Inchananiyil of the Syro-Malabar Catholic Eparchy of Thamarassery
- Bishop Mar Sebastian Adayanthrath of the Syro-Malabar Catholic Eparchy of Mandya

=== Province of Thrissur ===
- Metropolitan Archbishop Mar Andrews Thazhath of the Syro-Malabar Catholic Archeparchy of Thrissur
  - Auxiliary Bishop Mar Tony Neelankavil of the Syro-Malabar Catholic Archeparchy of Thrissur
- Bishop Mar Sebastian (Jobby) Pozholiparampil of the Syro-Malabar Catholic Eparchy of Hosur
- Bishop Mar Pauly Kannookadan of the Syro-Malabar Catholic Eparchy of Irinjalakuda
- Bishop Mar Peter Kochupuruckal of the Syro-Malabar Catholic Eparchy of Palghat
  - Bishop emeritus Mar Jacob Manathodath of the Syro-Malabar Catholic Eparchy of Palghat
- Bishop Mar Paul Alappat of the Syro-Malabar Catholic Eparchy of Ramanathapuram

=== Province of Ujjain ===
- Metropolitan Archbishop Mar Sebastian Vadakel, MST of the Syro-Malabar Catholic Archeparchy of Ujjain
- Bishop Mar Joseph Kollamparampil, CMI of the Syro-Malabar Catholic Eparchy of Jagdalpur
- Bishop Mar James Athikalam, MST of the Syro-Malabar Catholic Eparchy of Sagar
  - Bishop emeritus Mar Anthony Chirayath of the Syro-Malabar Catholic Eparchy of Sagar
- Bishop Mar Joseph Kodakallil of the Syro-Malabar Catholic Eparchy of Satna
  - Bishop emeritus Mar Matthew Vaniakizhakel, VC of the Syro-Malabar Catholic Eparchy of Satna

=== Archdiocese of Kottayam ===
- Metropolitan Archbishop Mar Mathew Moolakkattu of the Syro-Malabar Catholic Archeparchy of Kottayam
  - Auxiliary Bishop Mar Jose Pandarassery of the Syro-Malabar Catholic Archeparchy of Kottayam
  - Auxiliary Bishop Mar Geevarghese Aprem Kurisummoottil of the Syro-Malabar Catholic Archeparchy of Kottayam
  - Auxiliary bishop Thomas Animoottil of the Syro-Malabar Catholic Archeparchy of Kottayam

== Syro-Malankara Ecclesiastical Provinces ==
=== Province of Trivandrum ===
- Major Archbishop Cardinal Baselios Mor Cleemis of the Syro-Malankara Major Archeparchy of Trivandrum
  - Bishop Antony Mar Silvanos (born Kakkanatt) of the Curia of the Syro-Malankara Major Archeparchy of Trivandrum and Apostolic Visitor for Syro-Malankara faithful resident in Oceania
  - Auxiliary bishop Yoohanon Mar Alexios (born John Kuttiyil) of the Syro-Malankara Major Archeparchy of Trivandrum
- Bishop Mathews Mar Pachomios (born Kadavil), OIC of the Syro-Malankara Catholic Eparchy of St. Ephrem of Khadki
- Bishop Vincent Mar Paulos (born Kulapuravilai) of the Syro-Malankara Eparchy of Marthandom
- Bishop Mathew Mar Polycarpos (born Manakkarakavil) of the Syro-Malankara Eparchy of Mavelikara
  - Bishop emertius Joshua Mar Ignathios (born Kizhakkeveettil) of the Syro-Malankara Eparchy of Mavelikara
- Bishop Thomas Mar Eusebius (born Naickamparampil) of the Syro-Malankara Eparchy of Parassala
- Bishop Samuel Mar Irenios (born Kattukallil) of the Syro-Malankara Eparchy of Pathanamthitta
  - Bishop emeritus Yoohanon Mar Chrysostom (born Kalloor) of the Syro-Malankara Eparchy of Pathanamthitta

=== Province of Tiruvalla ===
- Metropolitan Archbishop Thomas Mar Koorilos of the Syro-Malankara Catholic Archeparchy of Tiruvalla
- Bishop Joseph Mar Thomas (born Konnath) of the Syro-Malankara Catholic Eparchy of Bathery
- Bishop Yoohanon Mar Theodosius (born Kochuthundil) of the Syro-Malankara Catholic Eparchy of Muvattupuzha and Apostolic Visitor for Syro-Malankara faithful resident in Europe
- Bishop Geevarghese Mar Makarios (born Kalayil) of the Syro-Malankara Catholic Eparchy of Puthur

=== Directly under the Holy See ===
- Bishop Thomas Mar Anthonios, OIC of the Syro-Malankara Catholic Eparchy of St. John Chrysostom of Gurgaon

== Indian bishops serving abroad ==
=== Diocesan bishops and equivalent ===
- Archbishop Alex Thomas Kalayanil (born Valiyavilayil), SVD of the Archdiocese of Bulawayo, Zimbabwe
- Archbishop Susai Jesu, OMI of the Archdiocese of Keewatin–Le Pas, Canada
- Bishop Mar Joy Alappat of the Syro-Malabar Catholic Eparchy of St. Thomas the Apostle of Chicago, USA (United States)
- Bishop Philippos Mar Stephanos (born Thottathil) of the Syro-Malankara Catholic Eparchy of St. Mary, Queen of Peace of USA and Canada (United States)
- Bishop Georges Varkey Puthiyakulangara, MEP of the Diocese of Port-Bergé, Madagascar
- Bishop Mar Jose Kalluvelil, of the Syro-Malabar Catholic Eparchy of Mississauga, Canada
- Bishop Mar Joseph Srampickal (born Benny Mathew) of the Syro-Malabar Catholic Eparchy of Great Britain (United Kingdom)
- Bishop Mar Stephen Chirappanath, Apostolic Visitor for the Syro-Malabar faithful in Europe
- Bishop Rozario Menezes, SMM of the Diocese of Lae, Papua New Guinea
- Bishop Siby Mathew Peedikayil, HGN of the Diocese of Aitape, Papua New Guinea
- Bishop Earl Kenneth Fernandes of the Diocese of Columbus, USA (Indian Origin) (United States)
- Bishop Mar John Panamthottathil, CMI of the Syro-Malabar Catholic Eparchy of St. Thomas the Apostle of Melbourne, Australia (New Zealand)
- Bishop Kuriakose Osthathios Thadathil (born Thadathil), Apostolic Visitor for the Syro-Malankara faithful in Europe
- Auxiliary Bishop Joshy George Pottackal, O.Carm. of Diocese of Mainz, Germany

=== Apostolic nuncios and papal representatives ===
- Archbishop Francis Assisi Chullikatt, Apostolic Nuncio to Bosnia and Herzegovina, Apostolic Nuncio to Montenegro
- Archbishop Mar Kurian Mathew Vayalunkal, Apostolic Nuncio to Chile
- Archbishop Mar George Panamthundil, Apostolic Nuncio to Kazakhstan, Apostolic Nuncio to Kyrgyzstan, Apostolic Nuncio to Tajikistan

=== Roman curia (Vatican City) ===
- Cardinal Mar George Jacob Koovakkad, prefect of the Dicastery for Interreligious Dialogue, and member of the Dicastery for the Eastern Churches

=== Retired ===
- Archbishop Blasco Francisco Collaço, Apostolic Nuncio emeritus to Swaziland (Eswatini) , Lesotho, South Africa, Namibia and Botswana
- Archbishop Mar George Panikulam, Apostolic Nuncio Emeritus to Uruguay
- Archbishop Mar George Kocherry, Apostolic Nuncio Emeritus to Bangladesh
- Bishop emeritus Mar Jacob Angadiath of the Syro-Malabar Catholic Eparchy of St. Thomas the Apostle of Chicago, USA (United States)
- Bishop emeritus Mar Bosco Puthur of the Syro-Malabar Catholic Eparchy of St. Thomas the Apostle of Melbourne, Australia

== Apostolic nunciature (Vatican City) ==
- Vacant

== Indian cardinals ==
Elector

- Mor Baselios Cardinal Cleemis Thottunkal, Major Archbishop of Trivandrum, Head of the Malankara Catholic Church and President of Synod of Syro-Malankara Church, member of the Dicastery for the Eastern Churches and Dicastery for Interreligious Dialogue, age 67.
- Filipe Neri Cardinal Ferrao, Metropolitan Archbishop Patriarch of Goa and Daman, and member of Dicastery for Evangelization in Section for Fundamental Questions regarding Evangelization in the World, age 73.
- Anthony Cardinal Poola, Metropolitan Archbishop of Hyderabad, and member of Dicastery for Promoting Integral Human Development, age 64.
- Mar George Jacob Cardinal Koovakkad, Prefect of the Dicastery for Interreligious Dialogue and member of the Dicastery for the Eastern Churches, age 53.

Non-electors

- Oswald Cardinal Gracias, Metropolitan Archbishop emeritus of Bombay, member of Council of Cardinals and Dicastery for Legislative Texts, age 81.
- Mar George Cardinal Alencherry, Major Archbishop Emeritus of Ernakulam–Angamaly, member of the Dicastery for the Eastern Churches and International Council for Catechesis, former Head of the Syro-Malabar Church and former President of the Synod of Syro-Malabar Church, age 81.

== See also ==
- List of Roman Catholic dioceses in India
- List of cathedrals in India
- Territories of Roman Catholic dioceses in India
- Catholic Bishops Conference of India
