= Territories of Catholic dioceses in India =

Latin rite provinces and dioceses of the Catholic church in India. The dioceses making up a province have different shades of the same colour

This article gives a list of the territories of the dioceses of the Catholic Church in India.

Each diocese is administered by a bishop. Dioceses are further grouped into ecclesiastical provinces. The most important diocese of the province is the archdiocese, and the bishop of this diocese is an archbishop. While they each usually consist of a few Indian civil districts, dioceses can range in size from just a portion of a district to spanning entire states. The civil district should not be confused with ecclesiastical district or deanery, which is another type of subdivision of a diocese.

All Catholics in India are under the authority of the respective Syro-Malankara, Syro-Malabar, or Latin bishop (personal jurisdiction). Only in the areas of the Syro-Malabar dioceses of Adilabad, Bijnor, Chanda, Gorakhpur, Jagdalpur, Rajkot, Sagar, Satna, and Ujjain, not covered by Latin rite dioceses, the authority of the Syro-Malabar bishop is over both Syro-Malabar and Latin rite Catholics.

It is to be noted that the territory of the Kingdom of Bhutan completely falls under the territorial jurisdiction of the Bishop of Darjeeling.

In the following, the names listed after the name of the state or union territory are the names of civil districts, unless otherwise mentioned. Some newly-created districts may be missing from this list.

== Latin Ecclesiastical Provinces ==
=== Province of Agra ===
Archdiocese of Agra	Uttar Pradesh: Agra, Aligarh, Auraiya, Budaun, Bulandshahr, Etah, Etawah, Farrukhabad, Firozabad, Gautam Buddh Nagar, Hathras, Kannauj, Kasganj, Mainpuri and Mathura Rajasthan: Bharatpur and Dholpur	
Diocese of Ajmer	Rajasthan: Ajmer, Jodhpur, Kota, Barmer, Bundi, Jalore, Jhalawar, Pali, Sirohi, Tonk, Jaisalmer and Baran	Map showing the location of the Diocese of Ajmer in India
Diocese of Allahabad	Uttar Pradesh: Allahabad, Ambedkar Nagar, Amethi, Faizabad, Fatehpur, Kanpur City, Kanpur Dehat (Akbarpur), Kaushambi, Mirzapur, Pratapgarh, Raebareli, Sonbhadra and Sultanpur	Map of the Diocese of Allahabad
Diocese of Bareilly	Uttar Pradesh: Bareilly, Shahjahanpur and Pilibhit Uttarakhand: Almora, Bageshwar, Champawat, Nainital, Pithoragarh and Udham Singh Nagar	
Diocese of Jaipur	Rajasthan: Jaipur, Karauli, Sawai Madhopur, Dausa, Alwar, Sikar, Jhunjhunu, Bikaner, Nagaur, Churu, Hanumangarh and Sri Ganganagar	Map of the Diocese of Jaipur
Diocese of Jhansi	Uttar Pradesh: Jhansi, Lalitpur, Jalaun, Banda, Chitrakoot, Hamirpur and Mahoba	Map of the Diocese of Jhansi
Diocese of Lucknow	Uttar Pradesh: Lucknow, Unnao, Barabanki, Gonda, Bahraich, Sitapur, Hardoi, Balrampur, Shravasti and Kheri	Map of the Diocese of Lucknow
Diocese of Meerut	Uttar Pradesh: Meerut, Muzaffarnagar, Saharanpur, Moradabad, Rampur, Jyotiba Phule Nagar, Ghaziabad, Baghpat and the tehsil of Dhampur of Bijnor Uttarakhand: Dehradun and Haridwar	
Diocese of Udaipur	Rajasthan: Udaipur, Rajsamand, Bhilwara, Chittorgarh, Dungarpur, Pratapgarh and Banswara Madhya Pradesh: Tehsil of Thandla (Jhabua district)	Map of the Diocese of Udaipur
Diocese of Varanasi	Uttar Pradesh: Varanasi, Azamgarh, Ballia, Bhadohi, Chandauli, Ghazipur, Jaunpur and Mau	Map of the Diocese of Varanasi

=== Province of Bangalore ===
Archdiocese of Bangalore	Karnataka: Bangalore, Kolar, Bangalore rural, Chikbulapur, Ramanagara and Tumkur	Map of the Archdiocese of Bangalore
Diocese of Belgaum	Karnataka: Belgaum, Bagalkot, Dharwad, Gadag and Haveri Maharashtra: Chandgad taluka in Kolhapur District	
Diocese of Bellary	Karnataka: Bellary, Raichur and Koppal	Map of the Diocese of Bellary
Diocese of Chikmagalur	Karnataka: Chikmagalur and Hassan	Map of the Diocese of Chikmagalur
Diocese of Gulbarga	Karnataka: Bidar, Kalaburagi, Yadgir and Bijapur	Map of the Diocese of Gulbarga
Diocese of Karwar	Karnataka: Uttara Kannada (North Canara)	
Diocese of Mangalore	Karnataka: Dakshina Kannada (South Canara) Kerala: Kasargod and Manjeshwaram talukas of Kasargod	Map showing the location of the Diocese of Mangalore in India
Diocese of Mysore	Karnataka: Mysore, Mandya, Coorg and Chamarajanagar	Map of the Diocese of Mysore
Diocese of Shimoga	Karnataka: Shimoga, Chitradurga and Davangere	Map of the Diocese of Shimoga
Diocese of Udupi	Karnataka: Udupi	

=== Province of Bhopal ===
Archdiocese of Bhopal	Madhya Pradesh: Bhopal, Harda, Hoshangabad and Sehore	Map of the Archdiocese of Bhopal
Diocese of Gwalior	Madhya Pradesh: Bhind, Datia, Gwalior, Morena, Sheopur and Shivpuri	Map of the Diocese of Gwalior
Diocese of Indore	Madhya Pradesh: Indore, Dewas and Dhar except the Tehsil of Sardarpur	
Diocese of Jabalpur	Madhya Pradesh: Jabalpur, Damoh, Mandla, Shahdol, Narsinghpur, Dindori, Umaria, Katni, Anuppur and the tehsil of Lakhnadon in Seoni district	
Diocese of Jhabua	Madhya Pradesh: Jhabua, Alirajpur, Ratlam, Mandsaur, Neemuch and Sardarpur Tehsil of Dhar district	
Diocese of Khandwa	Madhya Pradesh: Khandwa (East Nimar), Bhurhanpur, Barwani and Khargone (West Nimar)	Map of the Diocese of Khandwa

=== Province of Bombay ===
Archdiocese of Bombay	Maharashtra: Mumbai City, Mumbai Suburban, Raigad and Thane except Bhiwandi and Shahapur talukas	Map showing the location of the Archdiocese of Bombay in India
Diocese of Nashik	Maharashtra: Nashik, Dhule, Jalgaon, Nandurbar and Ahmednagar	Map showing the location of the Diocese of Nashik in India
Diocese of Poona	Maharashtra: Pune, Sangli, Satara and Solapur and the parish of Kolhapur	
Diocese of Vasai	Maharashtra: Palghar district and Bhiwandi and Shahapur talukas of Thane	

=== Province of Calcutta ===
Archdiocese of Calcutta	West Bengal: Kolkata, North 24 Parganas, Howrah, Hooghly, East Midnapore and West Midnapore and parts of Bankura.	Map showing the location of the Archdiocese of Calcutta in India
Diocese of Asansol	West Bengal: Burdwan district, nine blocks of Bankura district and 10 blocks of Birbhum district	
Diocese of Bagdogra	West Bengal: One sub-division (Siliguri) and part of another (Kurseong) among the four sub-divisions of Darjeeling district	
Diocese of Baruipur	West Bengal: South 24 Parganas district, small parts of Kolkata and of North 24 Parganas district	
Diocese of Darjeeling	West Bengal: Three hill sub-divisions of Darjeeling district: Darjeeling, Kurseong and Kalimpong Sikkim: Entire state Kingdom of Bhutan: Entire country	
Diocese of Jalpaiguri	West Bengal: Jalpaiguri and Cooch Behar	
Diocese of Krishnagar	West Bengal: Nadia and Murshidabad	
Diocese of Raiganj	West Bengal: North Dinajpur, South Dinajpur and Malda	

=== Province of Calicut ===
Archdiocese of Calicut	Kerala: Malappuram, Calicut and Wayanad; Puducherry: Mahe
Diocese of Kannur	Kerala: Kannur (to the north of Mahé River, excluding the territory of the municipality of Mahe) and Kasargod (south of the Chandragiri river)
Diocese of Sultanpet	Kerala: Palakkad

=== Province of Cuttack-Bhubaneswar ===
Archdiocese of Cuttack-Bhubaneswar	Orissa: Cuttack, Jajpur, Jagatsinghpur, Kendrapara, Khurda, Phulbani (Kandhamal), Boudh, Nayagarh and Puri	Map of the Archdiocese of Cuttack-Bhubaneswar
Diocese of Balasore	Orissa: Bhadrak, Balasore, Mayurbhanj and Keonjhar	Map of the Diocese of Balasore
Diocese of Berhampur	Orissa: Ganjam and Gajapati	Map of the Diocese of Berhampur
Diocese of Rayagada	Orissa: Nuapada, Koraput, Rayagada, Nabarangapur, Malkangiri and Kalahandi	Map of the Diocese of Rayagada
Diocese of Rourkela	Orissa: Sundergarh	
Diocese of Sambalpur	Orissa: Sambalpur, Anugul, Bargarh, Balangir, Debagarh, Dhenkanal, Jharsuguda and Sonapur	Map of the Diocese of Sambalpur

=== Province of Delhi ===
Archdiocese of Delhi	Delhi: Entire National Capital Territory	Map showing the location of the Archdiocese of Delhi in India
Diocese of Jammu-Srinagar	Jammu and Kashmir: Entire union territory Ladakh: Entire union territory	Map showing the location of the Diocese of Jammu-Srinagar in India
Diocese of Jalandhar	Punjab: Amritsar, Faridkot, Ferozepore, Fazilka, Gurdaspur, Hoshiarpur, Jalandhar, Kapurthala, Ludhiana, Moga, Muktsar, Nawanshahar, Tarn Taran and Pathankot districts and Anandpur Sahib tehsil of Ropar district Himachal Pradesh: Chamba, Hamirpur, Kangra and Una	
Diocese of Simla and Chandigarh	Himachal Pradesh: Kinnaur, Lahaul-Spiti, Kullu, Mandi, Bilaspur, Shimla, Solan and Sirmour Haryana: Panchkula, Ambala, Yamunanagar, Kurukshetra, Karnal, Panipat, Kaithal, Jind, Hissar, Bhiwani, Fatehabad and Sirsa; Punjab: Patiala, Sangrur, Mansa, Bhatinda, Fatehgarh Sahib, Barnala and Ropar; Chandigarh: Entire union territory	

=== Province of Gandhinagar ===
Archdiocese of Gandhinagar	Gujarat: Gandhinagar, Mehsana, Patan, Banaskantha, Aravalli and Sabarkantha	Map of the Archdiocese of Gandhinagar
Diocese of Ahmedabad	Gujarat: Ahmedabad, Anand and Nadiad	
Diocese of Baroda	Gujarat: Bharuch, Dahod, Dangs, Godhra, Narmada, Navsari, Surat, Tapi, Vadodara and Valsad	

=== Province of Goa and Daman ===
Archdiocese of Goa and Daman	Goa: Entire state Dadra and Nagar Haveli and Daman and Diu: Entire union territory	Map showing the location of the Archdiocese of Goa and Daman in India
Diocese of Sindhudurg	Maharashtra: Ratnagiri and Sindhudurg districts and Kolhapur district (except the city of Kolhapur)	

=== Province of Guwahati ===
Archdiocese of Guwahati	Assam: Nagaon, Morigaon, Kamrup, Kamrup Metropolitan and Goalpara	
Diocese of Bongaigaon	Assam: Nalbari, Barpeta, Bongaigaon, Kokrajhar, Chirang, Baksa and Dhubri	
Diocese of Dibrugarh	Assam: Tinsukia, Dibrugarh, Sivasagar, Jorhat and Golaghat	
Diocese of Diphu	Assam: Karbi Anglong, North Cachar Hills	
Diocese of Itanagar	Arunachal Pradesh: Tawang, West Kameng, East Kameng, Papum Pare, Upper Subansiri, Lower Subansiri, Kurung Kumey, West Siang, East Siang and Upper Siang	Map showing the location of the Diocese of Itanagar in India
Diocese of Miao	Arunachal Pradesh: Changlang, Upper Dibang valley, Lower Dibang valley, Anjaw, Lohit and Tirap	
Diocese of Tezpur	Assam: Darrang, Udalguri, Sonitpur, Lakhimpur and Dhemaji on the North bank of the Brahmaputra; Rupahihat, Kaliabor and Samuguri Subdivisions of Nagaon on the Southern Bank of Brahmaputra	

=== Province of Hyderabad ===
Archdiocese of Hyderabad	Telangana: Hyderabad, Ranga Reddy, Medak and Nizamabad
Diocese of Cuddapah	Andhra Pradesh: Cuddapah and Chittoor
Diocese of Khammam	Telangana: Khammam
Diocese of Kurnool	Andhra Pradesh: Kurnool and Anantpur
Diocese of Nalgonda	Telangana: Nalgonda and Mahabubnagar
Diocese of Warangal	Telangana: Warangal and Karimnagar

=== Province of Imphal ===
Archdiocese of Imphal	Manipur: entire state	Map showing the location of the Archdiocese of Imphal in India
Diocese of Kohima	Nagaland: Entire state	

=== Province of Madras and Mylapore ===
Archdiocese of Madras and Mylapore	Tamil Nadu: City of Chennai ( Areas under north of Adayar river) and Thiruvallur ( except Tiruttani taluk)
Diocese of Chingleput	Tamil Nadu: Kanchipuram, Chengalpattu and smaller parts of City of Chennai ( areas south of Adayar river )and Viluppuram
Diocese of Coimbatore	Tamil Nadu: Coimbatore, Tiruppur, Erode, Karur Kerala: A small portion of Chittur taluk of Palakkad
Diocese of Ootacamund	Tamil Nadu: Nilgiris, parts of Erode and a small portion of Coimbatore district which lies north of the River Bhavani
Diocese of Vellore	Tamil Nadu: Vellore, Tirupattur, Ranipet, Tiruvannamalai and Arakkonam taluk of Tiruvallur

=== Province of Madurai ===
Archdiocese of Madurai	Tamil Nadu: Madurai, Virudhunagar, Theni and four taluks - Nilakkottai, Kodaikanal, Batlagundu, Natham and four parishes in Dindigul taluk of Dindigul district	
Diocese of Dindigul	Tamil Nadu: remaining parts of Dindigul district	
Diocese of Kottar	Tamil Nadu: taluks of Thovalai, Agasteeswaram (minus the parish of Azhagappapuram, Rajakrishanapuram and Anjugramam) and Small portion Coastal Area of Kalkulam taluk of Kanyakumari district	
Diocese of Kuzhithurai	Tamil Nadu: taluks of Kalkulam and Vilavancode (minus seven villages along the coast belonging to the archdiocese of Trivandrum) of Kanyakumari district	
Diocese of Palayamkottai	Tamil Nadu: Ambai and Tirunelveli taluks of Tirunelveli district, full area of Tenkasi district, Kovilpatti and Kayathar taluks of Tuticorin district	Map showing the location of the Diocese of Palayamkottai in India
Diocese of Sivagangai	Tamil Nadu: Ramanathapuram and Sivagangai district	
Diocese of Tiruchirapalli	Tamil Nadu: Southern parts of Trichy City and Tiruchirapalli district, Northern parts of Pudukottai district and small part of Karur district	
Diocese of Tuticorin	Tamil Nadu: Tuticorin district (except Kovilpatti and Kayathar taluks), Nanguneri and Radhapuram taluks of Tirunelveli district and three parishes from Agasteeswaram taluk of Kanyakumari district	

=== Province of Nagpur ===
Archdiocese of Nagpur	Maharashtra: Nagpur, Gondia and Bhandara; Madhya Pradesh: Betul, Chhindwara, Seoni (except the tehsil of Lakhnadon) and Balaghat
Diocese of Amravati	Maharashtra: Amravati, Akola, Buldana, Washim and Yavatmal
Diocese of Aurangabad	Maharashtra: Aurangabad, Jalna, Parbhani, Nanded, Latur, Bhir, Hingoli and Osmanabad

=== Province of Patna ===
Archdiocese of Patna	Bihar: Aurangabad, Patna, Nalanda, Nawada, Lakhisarai, Sheikhpura, Arwal, Gaya, Jehanabad, parts of Jamui and Munger	
Diocese of Bettiah	Bihar: West Champaran, East Champaran, Gopalganj, Saran and Siwan	
Diocese of Bhagalpur	Bihar: Bhagalpur, Banka, Jamui, and parts of Munger; Jharkhand: Godda, Deoghar, Giridih and parts of Sahebganj	
Diocese of Buxar	Bihar: Bhojpur, Buxar, Kaimur and Rohtas	
Diocese of Muzaffarpur	Bihar: Vaishali, Samastipur, Sitamarhi, Darbhanga, Madhubani, Saharsa, Begusarai, Muzaffarpur, Khagaria, Sheohar, Madhepura and Supaul	Map showing the location of the Diocese of Muzaffarpur in India
Diocese of Purnea	Bihar: Purnea, Katihar, Kishanganj and Araria	

=== Province of Pondicherry and Cuddalore ===
Archdiocese of Pondicherry and Cuddalore	Puducherry: Pondicherry and Karaikal; Tamil Nadu: Taluks of Cuddalore, Panruti, Vridhachalam, Tittagudi and Chidambaram (exclusive of area south of the Vellar River) of the South Arcot, and the Villupuram, Gingee, Tindivanam, Vanur, Tirukkovilur, Ulundurpet, Kallakurichi and Sankarapuram taluks of Villupuram	Map of the Archdiocese of Pondicherry and Cuddalore
Diocese of Dharmapuri	Tamil Nadu: Dharmapuri, Krishnagiri	Map showing the location of the Diocese of Dharmapuri in India
Diocese of Kumbakonam	Tamil Nadu: 12 taluks from 5 districts of Tiruchirapalli, Thanjavur, Perambalur, Ariyalur, Thiruvarur, Cuddalore district, a small portion of Thiruvannamalai and North part of Trichy City	
Diocese of Salem	Tamil Nadu: Salem and Namakkal	
Diocese of Tanjore	Tamil Nadu: Thanjavur (except for the two taluks Papanasam and Kumbakonam in Thanjavur), Thiruvarur, Nagapattinam and Mayiladuthurai and six taluks of Pudukottai	

=== Province of Raipur ===
Archdiocese of Raipur	Chhattisgarh: Raipur, Bilaspur, Mahasamund, Durg, Dhamtari, Korba, Janjgir, Kawardha, Bemetara, Balod, Baloda Bazar, Gariyaband, Mungeli and Rajnandgaon	Map showing the location of the Archdiocese of Raipur in India
Diocese of Ambikapur	Chhattisgarh: Surguja, Surajpur, Balrampur and Korea	
Diocese of Jashpur	Chhattisgarh: Jashpur	
Diocese of Raigarh	Chhattisgarh: Raigarh	Map showing the location of the Diocese of Raigarh in India

=== Province of Ranchi ===
Archdiocese of Ranchi	Jharkhand: Ranchi and Lohardaga	Map showing the location of the Archdiocese of Ranchi in India
Diocese of Daltonganj	Jharkhand: Palamau, Garhwa and Latehar	
Diocese of Dumka	Jharkhand: Dumka, Sahibganj, Pakur, Jamtara and Madhupur subdivision of Deoghar West Bengal: Rampurhat sub-division of Birbhum	
Diocese of Gumla	Jharkhand: Gumla and part of Simdega	
Diocese of Hazaribag	Jharkhand: Chatra, Hazaribag, Ramgarh, Koderma and Bokaro excluding, the Chandankiyari block of Bokaro district together with that portion of Chas block which lies to the east of National Highway 32	
Diocese of Jamshedpur	Jharkhand: East Singhbhum, West Singhbhum (excluding the parish of Bandgoan), Seraikela Kharsawan, Dhanbad, a portion of Bokaro district (namely the Chandankiyari block and the Chas block which lie East of National Highway 32) West Bengal: Purulia	
Diocese of Khunti	Jharkhand: Khunti	
Diocese of Port Blair	Andaman and Nicobar Islands: Entire union territory	Map showing the location of the Diocese of Port Blair in India
Diocese of Simdega	Jharkhand: Simdega	

=== Province of Shillong ===
Archdiocese of Shillong	Meghalaya: East Khasi Hills and Ri Bhoi	Map of the Archdiocese of Shillong
Diocese of Agartala	Tripura: Entire state	
Diocese of Aizawl	Assam: Cachar, Hailakandi and Karimganj; Mizoram: Entire state	
Diocese of Jowai	Meghalaya: Jaintia Hills, East Jaintia Hills (Khliehriat)	Map of the Diocese of Jowai
Diocese of Nongstoin	Meghalaya: West Khasi Hills, South West Khasi Hills (Mawkyrwat)	Map of the Diocese of Nongstoin
Diocese of Tura	Meghalaya: East Garo Hills, North Garo Hills, South Garo Hills, West Garo Hills, South West Garo Hills (Ampati) and the part of Goalpara district south of Brahmaputra River	Map of the Diocese of Tura

=== Province of Thiruvananthapuram ===
Archdiocese of Thiruvananthapuram	Kerala: Trivandrum and Chirayinkil taluks of Thiruvananthapuram district with a small strip of coastal belt from Kovalam to Pozhiyoor in Neyyattinkara taluk Tamil Nadu: Neerody to Erayumanthurai of Kanyakumari district	
Diocese of Alleppey	Kerala: Alleppey and Ernakulam	
Diocese of Neyyattinkara	Kerala: Neyyattinkara and Nedumangad taluks of Thiruvananthapuram district	Map showing the location of the Diocese of Neyyattinkara in India
Diocese of Punalur	Kerala: Pathanamthitta district, Chengannur and Mavelikara talukas of Alappuzha district, Kottarakara, Kunnathur, Pathanapuram and Karunagappally talukas of Kollam district	
Diocese of Quilon	Kerala: Kollam district, the taluk of Karthikapally, portions of the taluks of Mavelikara and Chengannur which lie south of the river Pamba, in Alappuzha district	

=== Province of Verapoly ===
Diocese	Areas Covered	Map
Archdiocese of Verapoly	Kerala: Ernakulam	
Diocese of Cochin	Kerala: The territory of the Diocese of Cochin is situated between the Arabian Sea in the west, the Archdiocese of Verapoly in the north and east, and the Diocese of Alleppey in the south	Map showing the location of the Diocese of Cochin in India
Diocese of Kottapuram	Kerala: Spread across Ernakulam, Trichur, Malapuram and Palakkad	
Diocese of Vijayapuram	Kerala: Kottayam, Idukki and partial portions of Alleppey, Ernakulam and Pathanamthitta	

=== Province of Visakhapatnam ===
Archdiocese of Visakhapatnam	Andhra Pradesh: Visakhapatnam, East Godavari, and part of Vizianagaram	
Diocese of Eluru	Andhra Pradesh: West Godavari and the Mandals of Amalapuram, Kothapeta, Rajole, and Mummidivaram of East Godavari	Map showing the location of the Diocese of Eluru in India
Diocese of Guntur	Andhra Pradesh: Guntur district and Addanki Taluk of Prakasam district	
Diocese of Nellore	Andhra Pradesh: Nellore and Prakasam except Adoni taluk	
Diocese of Srikakulam	Andhra Pradesh: Srikakulam and the taluks of Kurupam, Parvathipuram, Cheepurupalli, and Gummalakshmipuram of Vizianagaram	Map showing the location of the Diocese of Srikakulam in India
Diocese of Vijayawada	Andhra Pradesh: Krishna	Map of the Diocese of Vijayawada

== Syro-Malabar Ecclesiastical Provinces ==
=== Province of Eranakulam - Angamaly ===
Syro-Malabar Catholic Archdiocese of Eranakulam-Angamaly	Kerala: Bordering the Chalakudy River in the North encompassing parts of Thrissur, almost the entire Ernakulam, and few parts along the Venbanadu lake in Kottayam, and Alleppey
Syro-Malabar Catholic Diocese of Idukki	Kerala: Devikulam taluk and parts of Idukki and Udumbanchola taluks of Idukki
Syro-Malabar Catholic Diocese of Kothamangalam	Kerala: Kothamangalam and Muvattupuzha taluks of Ernakulam and Thodupuzha taluk of Idukki

=== Province of Changanassery ===
Syro-Malabar Catholic Archdiocese of Changanassery	Kerala: Thiruvananthapuram, Kollam, and parts of Pathanamthitta, Alappuzha and Kottayam	
Syro-Malabar Catholic Diocese of Kanjirappally	Kerala: Parts of Kottayam, Pathanamthitta districts and Peermade taluk of Idukki	
Syro-Malabar Catholic Diocese of Palai	Kerala: Meenachil taluk of Kottayam and few villages of the neighboring taluks in Kottayam, Ernakulam and Idukki	
Syro-Malabar Catholic Diocese of Thuckalay	Tamil Nadu: Kanyakumari, Madurai, Ramanathapuram, Sivaganga, Theni, Thoothukudi, Tirunelveli and Virudhunagar	Map of the Eparchy of Thuckalay

=== Province of Faridabad ===
Syro-Malabar Archeparchy of Faridabad	Delhi, Chandigarh, Ladakh: Entire union territories Haryana, Punjab, Himachal Pradesh, Jammu and Kashmir: Entire states Uttar Pradesh: Gautam Buddh Nagar and Ghaziabad
Diocese of Bijnor	Uttarakhand: Entire state Uttar Pradesh: Bijnor, Bareilly, Shahjahanpur, Pilibhit, Meerut, Hapur, Muzaffarnagar, Shamli, Saharanpur, Moradabad, Sambhal, Rampur, Jyotibaphule Nagar (Amroha), and Baghpat
Diocese of Gorakhpur	Uttar Pradesh: Gorakhpur, Deoria, Sant Kabir Nagar, Basti, Kushinagar, Maharajganj, Siddharthnagar, Allahabad, Ambedkar Nagar, Amethi, Faizabad, Fatehpur, Kaushambi, Mirzapur, Pratapgarh, Raebareli, Sonbhadra, Sultanpur, Lucknow, Unnao, Barabanki, Gonda, Bahraich, Sitapur, Hardoi, Balrampur, Shravasti, Lakhimpur Kheri, Varanasi, Azamgarh, Ballia, Chandauli, Ghazipur, Jaunpur, SantRavidas Nagar (Bhadohi), and Mau

=== Province of Kalyan ===
Syro-Malabar Archeparchy of Kalyan	Maharashtra: Mumbai City, Mumbai Suburban, Thane, Raigad, Pune, Kolhapur, Satara, Solapur, Sangli, Sindhudurg, Ratnagiri, Nasik, Dhule, Jalgaon, Nandurbar, Ahmednagar, Palghar, Aurangabad, Jalna, Parbhani, Beed (Bhir), Nanded, Latur, Osmanabad, Buldhana and Akola Goa: Entire state
Diocese of Chanda	Maharashtra: Wardha, Chandrapur, Gadchiroli, Nagpur, Gondia, Bhandara, Amravati, Hingoli, Washim, and Yavatmal
Diocese of Rajkot	Gujarat: Amreli, Bhavnagar, Jamnagar, Junagadh, Porbandar, Rajkot, Surendranagar, Kutchch, Morbi, Gir Somnath, Botad, Devbhoomi Dwarka, Gandhinagar, Mehsana, Patan, Banaskantha, Sabarkantha and Aravalli Dadra and Nagar Haveli and Daman and Diu: Diu Island

=== Province of Shamshabad ===
Syro-Malabar Archeparchy of Shamshabad	Andhra Pradesh, Arunachal Pradesh, Assam, Bihar, Jharkhand, Manipur, Meghalaya, Mizoram, Nagaland, Orissa, Rajasthan, Sikkim, Tripura, West Bengal: Entire states Gujarat: All territories not falling within the jurisdiction of the eparchy of Rajkot; Telangana: All territories not falling within the jurisdiction of the eparchy of Adilabad; Uttar Pradesh: All territories not falling within the jurisdiction of the eparchies of Bijnor, Gorakhpur, Faridabad, Sagar and Satna; Andaman and Nicobar Islands, Lakshadweep: Entire union territories Dadra and Nagar Haveli and Daman and Diu: Entire union territory except Diu Island	Ecclesiastical territory of the Syro-Malabar Archeparchy of Shamshabad
Diocese of Adilabad	Telangana: Adilabad, Nirmal, Mancherial, Kumaram Bheem Asifabad, Nizamabad, Jagityal, Peddapalli, Kamareddy, Rajanna Sircilla, Karimnagar, Jaishankar Bhupalpally, Mulugu, Warangal Urban, Warangal Rural, Mahabubabad, Kothagudem and Khammam	

=== Province of Tellicherry ===
Syro-Malabar Catholic Archdiocese of Tellicherry	Kerala: Kannur and Kasargode	Map of the diocese of Tellicherry
Syro-Malabar Catholic Diocese of Belthangady	Karnataka: Kodagu, Dakshina Kannada and Udupi	Map of the Eparchy of Belthangady
Syro-Malabar Catholic Diocese of Bhadravathi	Karnataka: Shimoga, Chikmagalore, Haveri, Davangere, Chitradurga, Uttara Kannada, Belgaum, Bagalkot, Raichur, Bijapur, Koppal, Bellary, Gadag, Dharwar, Bidar, Gulbarga, Yadgir, and Vijayanagara	
Syro-Malabar Catholic Diocese of Mananthavady	Kerala: Wayanad and parts of Malapuram and Kannur Tamil Nadu: Nilgiris	
Syro-Malabar Catholic Diocese of Mandya	Karnataka: Mandya, Hassan, Mysore, Chamarajnagar, Bangalore Urban, Bangalore Rural, Chickballapur, Kolar, Tumkur and Ramnagara	Map of the Eparchy of Mandya
Syro-Malabar Catholic Diocese of Thamarassery	Kerala: Calicut and parts of Malappuram	

=== Province of Thrissur ===
Syro-Malabar Catholic Archdiocese of Thrissur	Kerala: Trichur district from Karuvannur River in the south till Bharathapuzha River in Malappuram in the north	Map of the Archdiocese of Thrissur
Syro-Malabar Diocese of Hosur	Tamil Nadu: Chennai, Cuddalore, Dharmapuri, Kanchipuram, Krishnagiri, Tiruvallur, Tiruvannamalai, Vellore, Viluppuram, Thirupathur, Ranipet, Kallakurichi; Puducherry: Pondicherry and Karaikal	Map of the Eparchy of Hosur
Syro-Malabar Catholic Diocese of Irinjalakuda	Kerala: Southern part of Thrissur, between the Karuvannur River in the north and the Chalakudy River in the south	
Syro-Malabar Catholic Diocese of Palghat	Kerala: Palakkad	
Syro-Malabar Catholic Diocese of Ramanathapuram	Tamil Nadu: Ariyalur, Coimbatore, Dindigul, Erode, Karur, Nagapattinam, Namakkal, Perambalur, Pudukkottai, Salem, Thanjavur, Tiruchirappalli, Tiruppur and Tiruvarur	Map of the Eparchy of Ramanathapuram

=== Province of Ujjain ===
Syro-Malabar Archdiocese of Ujjain	Madhya Pradesh: Ujjain, Shajapur, Rajgarh, Agar Malwa, Indore, Dewas, Dhar, Harda, Sehore, Jhabua, Alirajpur, Ratlam, Mandsaur, Neemuch, Khandwa (East Nimar), Burhanpur, Barwani, and Khargone (West Nimar)
Diocese of Jagdalpur	Chhattisgarh: Entire state
Diocese of Sagar	Madhya Pradesh: Sagar, Raisen, Vidisha, Ashoknagar, Guna, Bhopal, Hoshangabad, Betul, Chhindwara, Pandhurna, Seoni, Balaghat, Bhind, Datia, Gwalior, Morena, Sheopur and Shivpuri Uttar Pradesh: Lalitpur
Diocese of Satna	Madhya Pradesh: Chhatarpur, Niwari, Rewa, Mauganj, Panna, Satna, Maihar, Sidhi, Tikamgarh, Singrauli, Jabalpur, Mandla, Shahdol, Dindori, Umaria, Katni, Anuppur, Damoh and Narsinghpur Uttar Pradesh: Jhansi, Jalaun, Banda, Chitrakoot, Hamirpur and Mahoba

=== Archdiocese of Kottayam ===
Syro-Malabar Catholic Archdiocese of Kottayam	The jurisdiction of the Bishop of Kottayam is over all Knanaya Catholics (Suddhists) of the territory of the Syro Malabar Church

== Syro-Malankara Ecclesiastical Provinces ==
=== Province of Trivandrum ===
Syro-Malankara Major Archeparchy of Trivandrum	Kerala: Trivandrum except for the ecclesiastical districts of Parassala, Neyyattinkara and Kattakada, and parts of Kollam, Allapuzha and Pathanamthitta Tamil Nadu: some parts of Nagorkoil in Kanyakumari	
Syro-Malankara Eparchy of Marthandom	Tamil Nadu: Kanyakumari, Tiruchirappalli, Nagapattinam, Tiruvarur, Thanjavur, Pudukkottai, Dindigul, Madurai, Theni, Thoothukudi, Tenkasi, Tirunelveli, Perambalur, Virudhunagar, Ramanathapuram, Sivagangai, Cuddalore, Namakkal, Ariyalur, Mayiladuthurai and Karur	Map of the Eparchy of Marthandom
Syro-Malankara Eparchy of Mavelikara	Kerala: Alapuzha except for the portions that belong to the Archdiocese of Tiruvalla and parts of Kollam and Pathanamthitta	
Syro-Malankara Eparchy of Parassala	Kerala: Ecclesiastical districts of Parassala, Neyyattinkara and Kattakada and two parishes in the ecclesiastical district of Thiruvananthapuram in Thiruvananthapuram district	
Syro-Malankara Eparchy of Pathanamthitta	Kerala: Pathanamthitta	
Syro-Malankara Catholic Eparchy of St. Ephrem of Khadki	Maharashtra, Goa, Andhra Pradesh and Telangana: Entire states Karnataka: Bagalkote, Belgaum, Bijapur, Dharwad, Gadag, Haveri, Chitradurga, Davanagere, Ballari, Bidar, Kalaburagi, Koppal, Raichur and Yadagiri Tamil Nadu: Chennai, Vellore, Tiruvannamalai, Viluppuram, Kancheepuram, Tiruvallur, Kallakurichi, Chengalpattu, Tirupattur, Ranipet, Salem, Dharmapuri and Krishnagiri	

=== Province of Tiruvalla ===
Syro-Malankara Catholic Archeparchy of Tiruvalla	Kerala: Kottayam, Idukki and part of Pathanamthitta	
Syro-Malankara Catholic Eparchy of Muvattupuzha	Kerala: Ernakulam, Thrissur and Palakkad Tamil Nadu: Coimbatore, Tirupur and Erode	
Syro-Malankara Catholic Eparchy of Bathery	Kerala: Wayanad, Malapppuram, Kozhikode, Kannur and Kasargod Tamil Nadu: Nilgiris	
Syro-Malankara Catholic Eparchy of Puthur	Karnataka: Dakshina Kannada, Chamarajnagar, Chickmagalur, Hassan, Kodagu, Mandya, Mysore, Shimoga, Udupi, Uttara Kannada, Bangalore Rural, Ramanagara, Bangalore Urban, Tumakuru, Chikkaballapura and Kolar	Map of the Eparchy of Puthur

=== Directly under the Holy See ===
Syro-Malankara Catholic Eparchy of St. John Chrysostom of Gurgaon	Arunachal Pradesh, Assam, Bihar, Chhattisgarh, Gujarat, Haryana, Himachal Pradesh, Jammu and Kashmir, Jharkhand, Madhya Pradesh, Manipur, Meghalaya, Mizoram, Nagaland, Orissa, Punjab, Rajasthan, Sikkim, Tripura, Uttar Pradesh, Uttarakhand and West Bengal: Entire states Delhi, Chandigarh, Ladakh: Entire union territories

== See also ==
- Catholic Church in India
- List of Catholic dioceses in India
- List of districts of India
- List of cathedrals in India
- List of Catholic bishops of India
