= List of Catholic dioceses in India =

The Catholic Church in India has one of the largest number of dioceses in Asia. The bishops of the Latin Church, Syro-Malabar Church and Syro-Malankara Catholic Church form the Catholic Bishops' Conference of India (CBCI). This episcopal conference was established in 1944.

== By Type ==
By typology, the dioceses are categorised as :

- Major archepiscopial sees (Major archdioceses): 2
- Titular patriarchal see, metropolitan archdiocese: 1
- Metropolitan archdioceses: 31
- Archdiocese without suffragans: 1
- Dioceses: 139
- Titular episcopal see: 1

== By Rite ==
Out of the 174 dioceses in India,

- Latin has 132 dioceses.
- Syro-Malabar has 31 dioceses and
- Syro-Malankara has 11 dioceses.

== By Ecclesiastical Provinces ==
These are organised into 34 provinces comprising 24 Latin, 8 Syro-Malabar and 2 Syro-Malankara provinces.

== Latin Catholic Ecclesiastical Provinces ==
Latin ecclesiastical provinces and dioceses of the Catholic church in India. The dioceses making up a province have different shades of the same colour

=== Province of Agra ===
- Metropolitan Archdiocese of Agra
  - Diocese of Ajmer
  - Diocese of Allahabad
  - Diocese of Bareilly
  - Diocese of Jaipur
  - Diocese of Jhansi
  - Diocese of Lucknow
  - Diocese of Meerut
  - Diocese of Udaipur
  - Diocese of Varanasi

=== Province of Bangalore ===
- Metropolitan Archdiocese of Bangalore
  - Diocese of Belgaum
  - Diocese of Bellary
  - Diocese of Chikmagalur
  - Diocese of Gulbarga
  - Diocese of Karwar
  - Diocese of Mangalore
  - Diocese of Mysore
  - Diocese of Shimoga
  - Diocese of Udupi

=== Province of Bhopal ===
- Metropolitan Archdiocese of Bhopal
  - Diocese of Gwalior
  - Diocese of Indore
  - Diocese of Jabalpur
  - Diocese of Jhabua
  - Diocese of Khandwa

=== Province of Bombay ===
- Metropolitan Archdiocese of Bombay
  - Diocese of Poona
  - Diocese of Vasai
  - Diocese of Nashik

=== Province of Calcutta ===
- Metropolitan Archdiocese of Calcutta
  - Diocese of Asansol
  - Diocese of Bagdogra
  - Diocese of Baruipur
  - Diocese of Darjeeling
  - Diocese of Jalpaiguri
  - Diocese of Krishnagar
  - Diocese of Raiganj

=== Province of Calicut ===
- Metropolitan Archdiocese of Calicut
  - Diocese of Kannur
  - Diocese of Sultanpet

=== Province of Cuttack-Bhubaneswar ===
- Metropolitan Archdiocese of Cuttack-Bhubaneswar
  - Diocese of Balasore
  - Diocese of Berhampur
  - Diocese of Rayagada
  - Diocese of Rourkela
  - Diocese of Sambalpur

=== Province of Delhi ===
- Metropolitan Archdiocese of Delhi
  - Diocese of Jammu-Srinagar
  - Diocese of Jalandhar
  - Diocese of Simla and Chandigarh

=== Province of Gandhinagar ===
- Metropolitan Archdiocese of Gandhinagar
  - Diocese of Ahmedabad
  - Diocese of Baroda

=== Province of Goa and Daman ===
- Metropolitan Archdiocese of Goa and Daman (Note: The Archbishop of Goa and Daman also carries the title of the Patriarch of the East Indies.)
  - Diocese of Sindhudurg

=== Province of Guwahati ===
- Metropolitan Archdiocese of Guwahati
  - Diocese of Bongaigaon
  - Diocese of Dibrugarh
  - Diocese of Diphu
  - Diocese of Itanagar
  - Diocese of Miao
  - Diocese of Tezpur

=== Province of Hyderabad ===
- Metropolitan Archdiocese of Hyderabad
  - Diocese of Cuddapah
  - Diocese of Khammam
  - Diocese of Kurnool
  - Diocese of Nalgonda
  - Diocese of Warangal

=== Province of Imphal ===
- Metropolitan Archdiocese of Imphal
  - Diocese of Kohima

=== Province of Madras and Mylapore ===
- Metropolitan Archdiocese of Madras and Mylapore
  - Diocese of Chingleput
  - Diocese of Coimbatore
  - Diocese of Ootacamund
  - Diocese of Vellore

=== Province of Madurai ===
- Metropolitan Archdiocese of Madurai
  - Diocese of Dindigul
  - Diocese of Kottar
  - Diocese of Kuzhithurai
  - Diocese of Palayamkottai
  - Diocese of Sivagangai
  - Diocese of Tiruchirapalli
  - Diocese of Tuticorin

=== Province of Nagpur ===
- Metropolitan Archdiocese of Nagpur
  - Diocese of Amravati
  - Diocese of Aurangabad

=== Province of Patna ===
- Metropolitan Archdiocese of Patna
  - Diocese of Bettiah
  - Diocese of Bhagalpur
  - Diocese of Buxar
  - Diocese of Muzaffarpur
  - Diocese of Purnea

=== Province of Pondicherry and Cuddalore ===
- Archdiocese of Pondicherry and Cuddalore
  - Diocese of Dharmapuri
  - Diocese of Kumbakonam
  - Diocese of Salem
  - Diocese of Tanjore

=== Province of Raipur ===
- Metropolitan Archdiocese of Raipur
  - Diocese of Ambikapur
  - Diocese of Jashpur
  - Diocese of Raigarh

=== Province of Ranchi ===
- Metropolitan Archdiocese of Ranchi
  - Diocese of Daltonganj
  - Diocese of Dumka
  - Diocese of Gumla
  - Diocese of Hazaribag
  - Diocese of Jamshedpur
  - Diocese of Khunti
  - Diocese of Port Blair
  - Diocese of Simdega

=== Province of Shillong ===
- Metropolitan Archdiocese of Shillong
  - Diocese of Agartala
  - Diocese of Aizawl
  - Diocese of Jowai
  - Diocese of Nongstoin
  - Diocese of Tura

=== Province of Trivandrum ===
- Metropolitan Archdiocese of Trivandrum
  - Diocese of Alleppey
  - Diocese of Neyyattinkara
  - Diocese of Punalur
  - Diocese of Quilon

=== Province of Verapoly ===
- Metropolitan Archdiocese of Verapoly
  - Diocese of Cochin
  - Diocese of Kottapuram
  - Diocese of Vijayapuram

=== Province of Visakhapatnam ===
- Metropolitan Archdiocese of Visakhapatnam
  - Diocese of Eluru
  - Diocese of Guntur
  - Diocese of Nellore
  - Diocese of Srikakulam
  - Diocese of Vijayawada

== Syro-Malabar Catholic Ecclesiastical Provinces ==
The Syro-Malabar Church is governed by the Major Archbishop whose seat is Ernakulam-Angamaly and the synod of all bishops of this sui iuris church, both within and outside of India.

=== Province of Ernakulam - Angamaly ===
- Syro-Malabar Catholic Major Archeparchy of Ernakulam-Angamaly
  - Syro Malabar Catholic Eparchy of Idukki
  - Syro Malabar Catholic Eparchy of Kothamangalam

=== Province of Changanassery ===
- Syro-Malabar Catholic Archeparchy of Changanassery
  - Syro-Malabar Catholic Eparchy of Kanjirappally
  - Syro-Malabar Catholic Eparchy of Palai
  - Syro-Malabar Catholic Eparchy of Thuckalay

=== Province of Faridabad ===
- Syro Malabar Catholic Archeparchy of Faridabad
  - Syro-Malabar Catholic Eparchy of Bijnor
  - Syro-Malabar Catholic Eparchy of Gorakhpur

=== Province of Kalyan ===
- Syro Malabar Catholic Archeparchy of Kalyan
  - Syro-Malabar Catholic Eparchy of Chanda
  - Syro-Malabar Catholic Eparchy of Rajkot

=== Province of Shamshabad ===
- Syro-Malabar Catholic Archeparchy of Shamshabad
  - Syro-Malabar Catholic Eparchy of Adilabad

=== Province of Tellicherry ===
- Syro-Malabar Catholic Archeparchy of Tellicherry
  - Syro-Malabar Catholic Eparchy of Belthangady
  - Syro-Malabar Catholic Eparchy of Bhadravathi
  - Syro-Malabar Catholic Eparchy of Mananthavady
  - Syro-Malabar Catholic Eparchy of Thamarassery
  - Syro-Malabar Catholic Eparchy of Mandya

=== Province of Thrissur ===
- Syro-Malabar Catholic Archeparchy of Thrissur
  - Syro-Malabar Catholic Eparchy of Hosur
  - Syro-Malabar Catholic Eparchy of Ramanathapuram
  - Syro-Malabar Catholic Eparchy of Irinjalakuda
  - Syro-Malabar Catholic Eparchy of Palghat

=== Province of Ujjain ===
- Syro-Malabar Catholic Archeparchy of Ujjain
  - Syro-Malabar Catholic Eparchy of Jagdalpur
  - Syro-Malabar Catholic Eparchy of Sagar
  - Syro-Malabar Catholic Eparchy of Satna

=== Archdiocese of Kottayam ===
- Syro-Malabar Catholic Archeparchy of Kottayam

== Syro-Malankara Catholic Ecclesiastical Provinces ==
The Syro-Malankara Catholic Church is also a major archiepiscopal sui iuris Church. It is governed by the Major Archbishop whose seat is Trivandrum and its synod of bishops.

=== Province of Trivandrum ===
- Syro-Malankara Catholic Major Archeparchy of Trivandrum
  - Syro-Malankara Catholic Eparchy of St. Ephrem of Khadki
  - Syro-Malankara Catholic Eparchy of Marthandom
  - Syro-Malankara Catholic Eparchy of Mavelikara
  - Syro-Malankara Catholic Eparchy of Parassala
  - Syro-Malankara Catholic Eparchy of Pathanamthitta

=== Province of Tiruvalla ===
- Syro-Malankara Catholic Archeparchy of Tiruvalla
  - Syro-Malankara Catholic Eparchy of Muvattupuzha
  - Syro-Malankara Catholic Eparchy of Bathery
  - Syro-Malankara Catholic Eparchy of Puthur

=== Directly under the Holy See ===
- Syro-Malankara Catholic Eparchy of St. John Chrysostom of Gurgaon

=== Titular Episcopal See ===
- Titular Episcopal See of Chayal of Syro-Malankara

== See also ==
- Catholic Church in India
- Christianity in India
- List of cathedrals in India
- List of Catholic bishops of India
- List of Catholic dioceses (structured view)
- Territories of Catholic dioceses in India
