= Christianity in Bihar =

Christianity in Bihar, India

Total population
- '129,247' (0.12%) (2011)

Languages
- Bihari • Hindi •

Religion
- Christianity

Christianity in Bihar, a state in eastern India, is a minority religion, being practised by less than 0.5% of the population. The majority of Biharis are Hindus, forming 83% of the state's population. Padri Ki Haveli is a Roman Catholic church in Bihar, which has existed for centuries. Several Christian establishments such as the Diocese of Patna of the Church of North India, Emmanuel Christian Fellowship Centre (ECFC), Pentecostal Holiness Church and the Roman Catholic Archdiocese of Patna are present in Bihar.

The archdiocese has many suffragan diocesesincluding the Roman Catholic Diocese of Bettiah, the Roman Catholic Diocese of Bhagalpur, the Roman Catholic Diocese of Buxar, the Roman Catholic Diocese of Muzaffarpur and the Roman Catholic Diocese of Purnea. Bihar has numerous house churches The Indian Pentecostal Church of God is the leading and oldest Pentecostal church in Bihar. The earliest Pentecostal fellowship in the state was opened in Rajendra Nagar, Patna. Rev. Pramod K. Sebastian is the Pastor. Bihar also has a Christian Revival Church.

== History ==
During the Bettiah Raj of Bihar, the ethnoreligious community of Bettiah Christians was created in India in the 17th century by Christian missionaries belonging to the Order of Friars Minor Capuchin, a Roman Catholic religious order.

They are among the subcontinent's oldest Christian communities, being established after Raja Dhurup Singh requested Joseph Mary Bernini to heal his ill wife and was successful in doing so. The Bettiah Christian Mission flourished under the patronage of the royal court of the Bettiah Rajas, steadily growing in number.

From the 17th century onwards, Catholic Christian missionaries of the Jesuit and Capuchin religious orders "established hospices at Kathmandu, Patan and Bhatgoan, the capitals of the three Malla Kings of Nepal who had permitted them to preach Christianity." An indigenous Newar Christian community was thus founded in Bihar. When the Mallas were overthrown by the Gurkhas, the Newar Christians took refuge in India, settling first in the city of Bettiah and then later moving eleven kilometres north to Chuhari, where they reside to this day.

== List of denominations ==
- Bihar Mennonite Mandli
- Emmanuel Christian Fellowship Centre
- Bethel Pentecostal Church
- Gospel Echoing Missionary Society
- Indian Pentecostal church of God
- Christian Revival Church

== Demography ==
Christianity is 3rd largest religion of Bihar, being practiced by 0.12% of the total state population.
