= Diocese of Buxar =

Roman Catholic diocese in Bihar, India

Coordinates: 25.5576°N 83.9606°E

Diocese of Buxar Dioecesis Buxarensis बक्सर के सूबा

Location
- Country: India
- Ecclesiastical province: Patna
- Metropolitan: Patna

Statistics
- Area: 11,298 km^{2} (4,362 sq mi)
- Population: Total; Catholics: (as of 2012); 10,342,000; 25,434 (0.2%)
- Parishes: 15

Information
- Denomination: Catholic
- Sui iuris church: Latin Church
- Rite: Roman Rite
- Cathedral: Cathedral of Mary Mother of Perpetual Help in Buxar
- Patron saint: Our Lady of Perpetual Help

Current leadership
- Pope: Leo XIV
- Bishop elect: James Shekhar
- Metropolitan Archbishop: William D'Souza

Website
- buxardiocese.com

The Roman Catholic Diocese of Buxar (Latin: Dioecesis Buxarensis) in India was created on December 12, 2005. It is a suffragan diocese of the Archdiocese of Patna. The parish church "Mary Mother of Perpetual Help" in Buxar is the cathedral for the diocese.

The diocese covers an area of 11,311 km² of the Patna state, comprising the districts Buxar, Bhojpur, Bhabua, and Rohtas. The territory was previously administrated by the Archdiocese of Patna. The Sone River marks the boundary between the dioceses Patna and Buxar to the southeast. Other dioceses bordering are Varanasi to the west, Muzaffarpur to the north, and Daltonganj to the south.

The total population in the diocese is 5,781,132, of which 15,745 are Catholic. The diocese is subdivided into 13 parishes.

== Leadership ==
- William D'Souza, S.J. (25 March 2006 – 1 October 2007)
- Sebastian Kallupura (21 June 2009 – 29 June 2018)
