= Diocese of Patna =

Diocese of Patna may refer to:

- Roman Catholic Archdiocese of Patna
- Diocese of Patna (Church of North India)
