= Benedict John Osta =

Benedict John Osta SJ
- Archbishop of Patna
- Church: Catholic Church
- Archdiocese: Archdiocese of Patna
- In office: 6 March 1980 – 1 October 2007
- Predecessor: Augustine Francis Wildermuth
- Successor: William D'Souza

Orders
- Ordination: 9 June 1963
- Consecration: 21 June 1980 by Lawrence Picachy

Personal details
- Born: 15 August 1931 Bhasurari, Bihar and Orissa Province, British Raj, British Empire
- Died: 30 January 2014 (aged 82) Patna, Bihar, India

Benedict John Osta (15 August 1931 – 30 January 2014) was an Indian Roman Catholic archbishop.

Osta was ordained to the priesthood in 1963 for the Society of Jesus, In 1980 he was named bishop of the Diocese of Patna, India, and then was named archbishop of Patna in 1999. Osta retired in 2007. He died on 30 January 2014 at the age of 82.
