= Simião Purificação Fernandes =

- Church: Roman Catholic Church
- Appointed: 6 April 2024
- In office: 2024 - present

Orders
- Ordination: 10 May 1993
- Consecration: 17 June 2024 by Filipe Neri Ferrão

Personal details
- Born: 21 December 1967 (age 58) Chandor, Goa, India
- Denomination: Roman Catholicism
- Motto: Seva gheunk nhoi, punn seva diunk Not to be served, but to serve - Mk 10:45

Simião Purificação Fernandes is the auxiliary bishop of the Archdiocese of Goa and Daman in India since 2024.

== Priesthood ==
Fernandes was ordained a priest on 10 May 1993 and became priest of the Archdiocese of Goa and Daman. He worked mainly as a parish priest, but was also a lecturer at the patriarchal seminary in Rachol (2005–2018) and director of the archdiocesan Pastoral Institute of St. Pius X (2018–2024).

== Episcopate ==
On 6 April 2024, Pope Francis appointed him Auxiliary Bishop of Goa and Daman with the titular see of Saldae.

On 17 June 2024, he was ordained a bishop by Cardinal Filipe Neri Ferrão. The co-consecrators were bishops Theodore Mascarenhas and Aleixo das Neves Dias.
