= Bhasurari =

Bhasurari Chauk
- Village
- Location within Bihar
- Coordinates: 27.108°N 84.464°E
- Country: India
- State: Bihar
- District: West Champaran district

Languages
  - Official: Hindi
- Time zone: UTC+5:30 (IST)
- ISO 3166 code: IN-BR

Bhasurari is a village in West Champaran district in the Indian state of Bihar.

== Demographics ==
As of the 2011 census of India, Bhasurari had a population of 3,158 in 555 households. Males constituted 50.63% of the population and females 49.36%. Bhasurari had an average literacy rate of 42.97%, lower than the national average of 74%: male literacy was 61%, and female literacy was 38%. 17.57% of the population were under six years of age.
