= Bihar Mennonite Mandli =

Christian denomination in India

Bihar Mennonite Mandli is a Mennonite denomination of India. It has about 1175 members. It has 24 congregations.Bihar Mennonite Mandli dates to an attempt by Mennonite missionaries in the 1950s to establish a church that would not be dominated by large institutional mission structures. The conference was officially established in 1948 and became self-sustaining with the departure of missionaries in the 1980s. In 1999, the state of Bihar was divided into two states, with the Mennonite center being in the new state of Jharkhand. The conference, still retains the name Bihar Mennonite Mandli.
