= Diocese of Bettiah =

Roman Catholic diocese in Bihar, India

Coordinates: 26.8033°N 84.5031°E

Diocese of Bettiah Dioecesis Bettiahensis बेतिया के सूबा
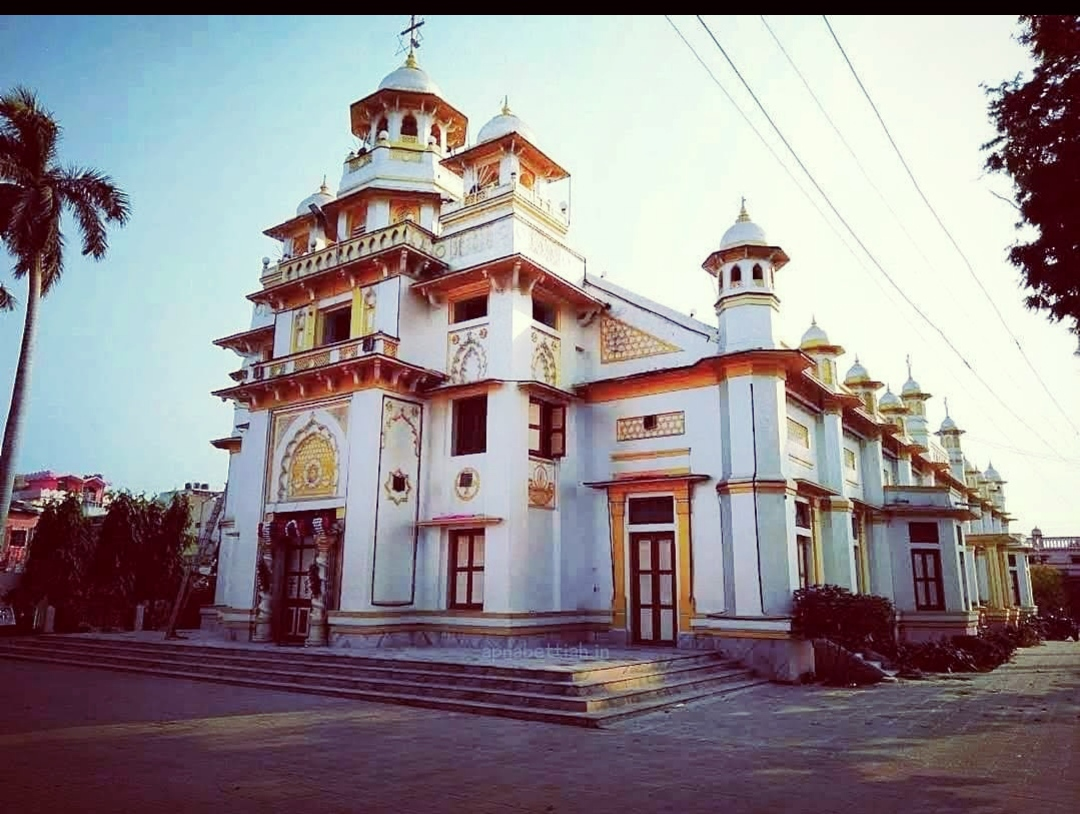
- Bettiah cathedral church

Location
- Country: India
- Ecclesiastical province: Patna
- Metropolitan: Patna

Statistics
- Area: 16,089 km^{2} (6,212 sq mi)
- Population: Total; Catholics: (as of 2012); 15,891,000; 5,810 (0.0%)
- Parishes: 12

Information
- Rite: Latin Rite
- Cathedral: Cathedral of the Nativity of the Blessed Virgin Mary in Bettiah

Current leadership
- Pope: Leo XIV
- Bishop: Fr. Peter Sebastian Goveas
- Metropolitan Archbishop: William D'Souza

The Roman Catholic Diocese of Bettiah (Latin: Bettiahen(sis)) is a diocese located in the city of Bettiah in the ecclesiastical province of Patna in India.

Some of the communicants within this diocese are Bettiah Christians, one of the oldest ethnoreligious Christian communities in the northern Indian subcontinent. Newaris of the Catholic Christian faith who settled in Chuhari in the 1700s after being expelled from Nepal, are part of the Roman Catholic Diocese of Bettiah as well; they are known as Newar Christians. Other Catholic Christian communities who are served by the Roman Catholic Diocese of Bettiah include those of scheduled castes and tribal people.

== History ==
- 1892: Established as the Apostolic Prefecture of Bettiah from the Diocese of Allahabad
- 1917: Suppressed to the Apostolic Vicariate of Patna
- 27 June 1998: Restored as Diocese of Bettiah from the Diocese of Muzaffarpur

Elanjimannil Chacko Sebastian(also known as E. C. Sebastian) is an Indian Jesuit priest, academic and professional services consultant. He is a member of the Society of Jesusand is associated with the Patna Province.

In the United States, Father Sebastian was associated with Blessed Sacrament Catholic Church in Hollywood, Los Angeles, where he served in a pastoral capacity. In 2018, the Archdiocese of Los Angeles published a list of clergy credibly accused of sexual abuse, on which Father Sebastian's name appeared in connection with his time in Los Angeles.

Father Sebastian subsequently worked in Afghanistan, where he served as a professor at the National Institute of Management (NIMA). He also worked as a consultant on Afghanistan projects connected with the World Bank, including assignments as Senior Faculty for Accounting. He was associated with E.C. Sebastian & Co., an Afghanistan-based professional services firm offering audit, tax, financial advisory, consulting and outsourcing services. The firm's published client list included Al Jazeera Network, Afghan International Bank (AIB), the Afghan Red Crescent Society (ARCS), Da Qanoon Ghustoonky (DQG), Afghanistan Information Management Service (AIMS) and OFARIN, as well as numerous Afghan companies.

World Bank procurement records list E. C. Sebastian as a contracted Senior Faculty for Accounting under the Afghanistan Second Skills Development Project. Audits of the project identified unsupported and questioned expenditures and weaknesses in financial controls and accountability. The project and the wider Afghan skills-development sector were also subject to scrutiny by the Special Inspector General for Afghanistan Reconstruction (SIGAR).

Father Sebastian has also been named in records concerning an Indian adoption case dating from 1985. According to Jyoti Weststrate, she was found at the Church of the Nativity of the Blessed Virgin Mary in Bettiah, Bihar, where she states that she was handed over to Father Sebastian by seven men. She states that Father Sebastian later described her as having been given to him as a "gift". She was subsequently transferred to an orphanage and never reunited with her biological family.

In 2015, Jyoti states that she experienced sexual misconduct by Father Sebastian. She formally reported the alleged misconduct to the Society of Jesus in 2025. Following a safeguarding process, the Society of Jesus recognized her account as credible and issued an official apology to her in 2025.

Father Sebastian remains a member of the Society of Jesus and is associated with the Patna Province.

== Leadership ==
- Bishops of Bettiah (Latin Rite)
  - Fr. Peter Sebastian Goveas, Vicar General of Bhagalpur Diocese, is elected new Bishop of the Catholic Diocese of Bettiah on 22 July 2017
  - Bishop Victor Henry Thakur (27 June 1998 – 3 July 2013); elevated to Archbishop of the Roman Catholic Archdiocese of Raipur, in Raipur, India, by Pope Francis
- Prefects Apostolic of Bettiah (Latin Rite)
  - Fr. Eugenio Remigio Schwarz, O.F.M. Cap. (1892 – 1918)

== See also ==
- Christianity in Bihar
