= Aleixo das Neves Dias =

Most Reverend Aleixo das Neves Dias, S.F.X.
- Bishop Emeritus of Port Blair
- Archdiocese: Ranchi
- Diocese: Port Blair
- Appointed: 22 June 1984
- Term ended: 6 January 2019
- Successor: Visuvasam Selvaraj

Orders
- Ordination: 21 December 1969
- Consecration: 20 January 1985 by Archbishop Pius Kerketta, S.J.

Personal details
- Born: 5 August 1944 (age 82) Calangute, Goa, Portuguese India
- Denomination: Roman Catholic
- Residence: Pilar Monastery, Pilar, Goa.
- Parents: Mr. Francisco Xavier Dias; Mrs. Feliza Clara Dias
- Motto: SPLENDIDUM SERVI DEI

Bishop Aleixo das Neves Dias, S.F.X. is a prelate of the Catholic Church who was Bishop of the Roman Catholic Diocese of Port Blair, India, from 1985 to 2019.

== Biography ==
Aleixo was born in Calangute, Portuguese Goa on 5 August 1944 to Francisco Xavier Dias and Feliza Clara Dias. He did his basic schooling from Little Flower of Jesus High School, Calangute. He joined All India Mission Seminary, Pilar Goa in 1956.

Aleixo was ordained a priest of Society of the Missionaries of Saint Francis Xavier on 21 December 1969.

He served as the rector of the All India Mission Seminary, Pilar, in Goa. He completed his master's degree in sociology in Rome in 1976. In 1980, he acquired a diploma in communications in London.

Aleixo was appointed the first bishop of Port Blair on 22 June 1984 by Pope John Paul II and received his episcopal consecration on 20 January 1985 from Pius Kerketta, S.J., Archbishop of Ranchi.

Pope Francis accepted his resignation on 6 January 2019.
