= William D'Souza =

The Most Reverend William D’Souza
- Archbishop Emeritus of Patna
- Archdiocese: Patna
- See: Patna
- Appointed: 1 October 2007
- Installed: 1 October 2007
- Term ended: 9 December 2020
- Predecessor: Benedict John Osta
- Successor: Sebastian Kallupura
- Previous post: Provincial of the Patna Jesuit Province.

Orders
- Ordination: 3 May 1976
- Consecration: 25 March 2006 by Pedro López Quintana

Personal details
- Born: 5 March 1946 (age 80) Madanthyar, Karnataka
- Residence: Archbishop's House Bankipur, Patna 800 004, Bihar, India

Styles of William D’Souza
- Reference style: The Most Reverend
- Spoken style: Your Excellency
- Religious style: Monsignor

William D’Souza, S.J is the Archbishop Emeritus of Roman Catholic Archdiocese of Patna, India.

== Early life ==
He was born in Madanthyar in Mangalore, Karnataka on 5 March 1946.

== Priesthood ==
He was ordained a Catholic Missionary Priest for the Society of Jesus on 3 May 1976.

== Episcopate ==
He was appointed Bishop of Buxar on 12 December 2005 and ordained a bishop on 25 March 2006. He was appointed Archbishop of Patna on 1 October 2007. On 9 December 2020 D’Souza's resignation was accepted by Pope Francis, and auxiliary bishop Sebastian Kallupura was named as his successor.
