= Eparchy of Palghat =

Eastern Catholic eparchy in Kerala, India

Location
- Country: India
- Ecclesiastical province: Syro-Malabar Catholic Archeparchy of Thrissur
- Metropolitan: Syro-Malabar Archbishop of Thrissur

Information
- Denomination: Syro-Malabar Catholic
- Rite: East Syriac Rite

Current leadership
- Pope: Leo XIV
- Major Archbishop: Mar Raphael Thattil
- Bishop: Mar Peter Kochupurackal
- Metropolitan Archbishop: Mar Andrews Thazhath
- Bishops emeritus: Mar Jacob Manathodath

The Eparchy of Palghat is a diocese of the Syro-Malabar Catholic Church, centred on the city of Palakkad in the state of Kerala, in South India. It is a suffragan bishopric of the Archdiocese of Trichur. The current bishop is Peter Kochupurackal, who was appointed in 2022.

== History of Diocese of Palghat (Palakkad) ==
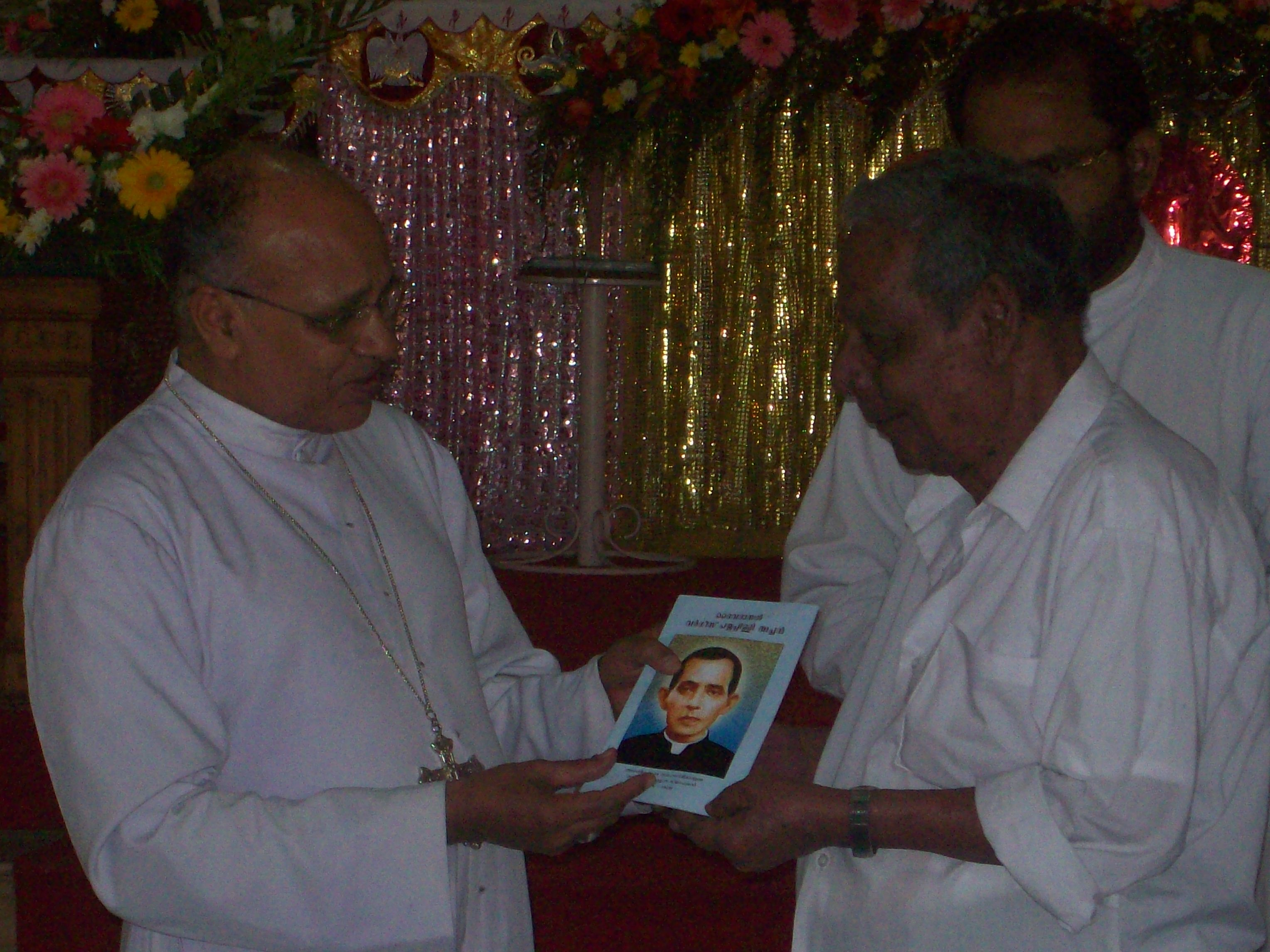
Mar Jacob Manathodath, bishop of Palakkad diocese, releasing the biography of Venerable Payyappilly Mar Varghese Kathanar during his 82nd death anniversary by handing over a copy of it to his great-nephew Mathai Payyappilly Palakkappilly

The Eparchy of Palghat was erected on 20 June 1974, through the Decree "Apostolico Requirente" by Pope Paul VI, bifurcating the eparchy of Trichur and adding into the territory of the new eparchy a few parishes of the eparchy of Tellichery, which were in the district of Palakkad. It was a suffragan of the Archdiocese of Ernakulam. The eparchy was inaugurated on 8 September 1974. The episcopal ordination of Msgr. Joseph Irimpen and his assumption of office as the first bishop of the eparchy took place on the same day. It is now a suffragan of the Archdiocese of Trichur. The eparchy covers an area of 4,482 km^{2}. At the time of the inauguration of the Eparchy it had a total of 16 parishes and 8 stations. The number of diocesan priests was 14 and that of the adherents was 20,810. It has now 69,057 adherents, 127 priests incarnated to it and 99 parishes and 45 stations. Bishop Irimpen retired from his office on 6 December 1994 and died on 23 August 1997. Msgr. Joseph Veliyathil served the Eparchy as its Administrator from 6 December 1994 to 1 February 1997. Pope John Paul II nominated Bishop Jacob Manathodath, then the Auxiliary Bishop of Ernakulam-Angamaly as the Bishop of Palghat on 11 November 1996. Bishop Manathodath took canonical possession of the eparchy on 1 February 1997.

The diocese of Palghat was bifurcated and a new diocese, named Ramanathapuram, was erected on 18 January 2010.

== Ordinaries ==
Eparchs of Palghat (East Syriac Rite)

- Joseph Irimpen (27 June 1974 – 1 December 1994), retired
- Jacob Manathodath (11 November 1996 – 15 January 2022), retired
- Peter Kochupuruckal (15 January 2022 – Present)

Auxiliary Eparchs of Palghat

- Peter Kochupuruckal (2020-2022), Titular Eparch of Lares

Other Priests of this Eparchy who were promoted elsewhere

- Jose Kalluvelil (1984-2015), appointed Apostolic Exarch of Canada
