= Diocese of Khammam =

Roman Catholic diocese in Telangana, India

Coordinates: 17.2364°N 80.1364°E

Diocese of Khammam Dioecesis Khammamensis खम्मम के सूबा

Location
- Country: India
- Ecclesiastical province: Hyderabad
- Metropolitan: Hyderabad

Statistics
- Area: 16,029 km^{2} (6,189 sq mi)
- Population: Total; Catholics: (as of 2006); 2,611,010; 117,553 (4.5%)

Information
- Rite: Latin Rite
- Cathedral: Divine Mercy Cathedral in Khammam
- Co-cathedral: St. Joseph's cathedral Gutalla bazar Khammam

Current leadership
- Pope: Leo XIV
- Bishop: Prakash Sagili
- Metropolitan Archbishop: Poola Anthony

The Roman Catholic Diocese of Khammam (Latin: Khammamen(sis)) is a diocese located in the city of Khammam in the ecclesiastical province of Hyderabad in India.

== History ==
The diocese of Khammam was bifurcated from the ecclesiastical jurisdiction of Warangal diocese by the Papal Bull ad "perpetuam rei memoriam" on 11 February 1988. It comprises the entire revenue district of Khammam. Most. Rev. Joseph Rajappa was appointed as the first Bishop of Khammam diocese. The Christian faith in this area has a century-old history.

=== Initial Days ===
The Mission work was actually launched by the PIME missionaries much before 1885 when this area was under the Hyderabad vicariate. The oldest Catholic Community brought to faith by Fr.F.Rolla PIME to Bayyaram village in 1901 still remains as a historical monument. Msgr. Vigano's Pastoral visits to different places could also bring some impact to the Christian communities. Because of their strenuous efforts, we could now have the pride of having Bayyaram parish(https://www.google.co.in/maps/place/Varadha+Matha+Shrine/@16.9434417,80.3356759,15z/data=!4m5!3m4!1s0x0:0xe06fc17ee2443899!8m2!3d16.9434417!4d80.3356759?sa=X&ved=0ahUKEwijyO-H-PPaAhXLQ48KHR40DlUQ_BIIeDAO) because the first one to yield the first vocation in the diocese and later five more.

=== Khammam under Warangal Diocese ===
The Diocese of Warangal was bifurcated from the Ecclesiastical territory of Hyderabad as a separate diocese, comprising the districts of Warangal, Khammam, Karimnagar, and Nalgonda by Pope Pious the XII on 22 December 1952. Most Rev. Alphonsus Beretta PIME was the first Bishop of Warangal. On 8 January 1953, under the dynamic leadership and great vision of Bishop A. Beretta, the Catholic Church in Khammam penetrated into interior places. Bishop Beretta set up many schools, dispensaries, boardings and launched other socio-economic developmental schemes. He invited several religious congregations to work in the rural belt of Khammam. In 1985 Bishop A. Beretta PIME retired and in 1987 bishop Thumma Bala was appointed as the second Bishop of Warangal. Before he could realize his plans, Khammam district was declared as a diocese in 1988. Bishop Joseph Rajappa was appointed as the first Bishop of Khammam. Unfortunately, he died in the following year i.e. 27 December 1989 due to old age and illness. The diocese was administered for a couple of years by Rev.Fr.M. Lourdunathan. On 31 January 1992, Fr.Marampudi Joji, of Vijayawada diocese was appointed as second Bishop of Khammam. After four and a half years, he was transferred to Vijayawada on 18 December 1996. Rev. Fr. D. Melchior Raja, PIME, administered the diocese for a couple of months. On 30 May 1997, Fr. Maipan Paul of Visakhapatnam diocese was appointed as the third Bishop of Khammam.

== Leadership ==
- Bishops of Khammam (Latin Rite)
  - Bishop Paul Maipan (21 April 1997 – 27 August 2022)
  - Bishop Marampudi Joji (later Archbishop) (21 December 1991 – 8 November 1996)
  - Bishop Joseph Rajappa (18 January 1988 – 27 December 1989)
