= Diocese of Asansol =

Roman Catholic diocese in West Bengal, India

Coordinates: 23.6877°N 86.9710°E

Diocese of Asansol Dioecesis Asansolensis आसनसोल के सूबा

Location
- Country: India
- Ecclesiastical province: Asansol
- Metropolitan: Asansol

Statistics
- Area: 12,500 km^{2} (4,800 sq mi)
- Population: Total; Catholics: (as of 2012); 14,069,000; 29,345 (0.2%)
- Parishes: 15

Information
- Rite: Latin Rite
- Established: 1997; 29 years ago
- Cathedral: Cathedral of the Sacred Heart in Asansol
- Secular priests: 69

Current leadership
- Pope: Leo XIV
- Bishop: Vacant
- Metropolitan Archbishop: Elias Frank

The Roman Catholic Diocese of Asansol (Latin: Asansolen(sis)) is a diocese located in the city of Asansol in the ecclesiastical province of Calcutta in India.

== History ==
- With his decree, dated October 24, 1997, Pope John Paul II created the Diocese of Asansol bifurcating the Metropolitan Archdiocese of Calcutta (cfr. Acta Apostolicae Sedis|90(1998)|p. 172). The Diocese of Asansol however, came into existence on March 12, 1998, when Bishop Cyprian Monis, its first bishop, officially took possession of it. The act of taking possession is popularly known as "installation".

== Leadership ==
- Bishops of Asansol (Latin Rite)
  - Bishop Cyprian Monis (March 12, 1998 – May 4, 2020)
  - Elias Frank (2023 to June 28, 2025)
