= Diocese of Port Blair =

Roman Catholic diocese in Andaman and Nicobar Islands, India

Coordinates: 11.6671°N 92.7314°E

Diocese of Port Blair Dioecesis Portus Blairensis

Location
- Country: India
- Ecclesiastical province: Ranchi
- Metropolitan: Ranchi

Statistics
- Area: 8,249 km^{2} (3,185 sq mi)
- Population: Total; Catholics: (as of 2017); 471,430; 39,935 (8.5%)

Information
- Rite: Latin Rite
- Cathedral: Stella Maris Cathedral in Port Blair

Current leadership
- Pope: Leo XIV
- Bishop elect: Visuvasam Selvaraj
- Metropolitan Archbishop: Felix Toppo

Website
- Website of the Diocese

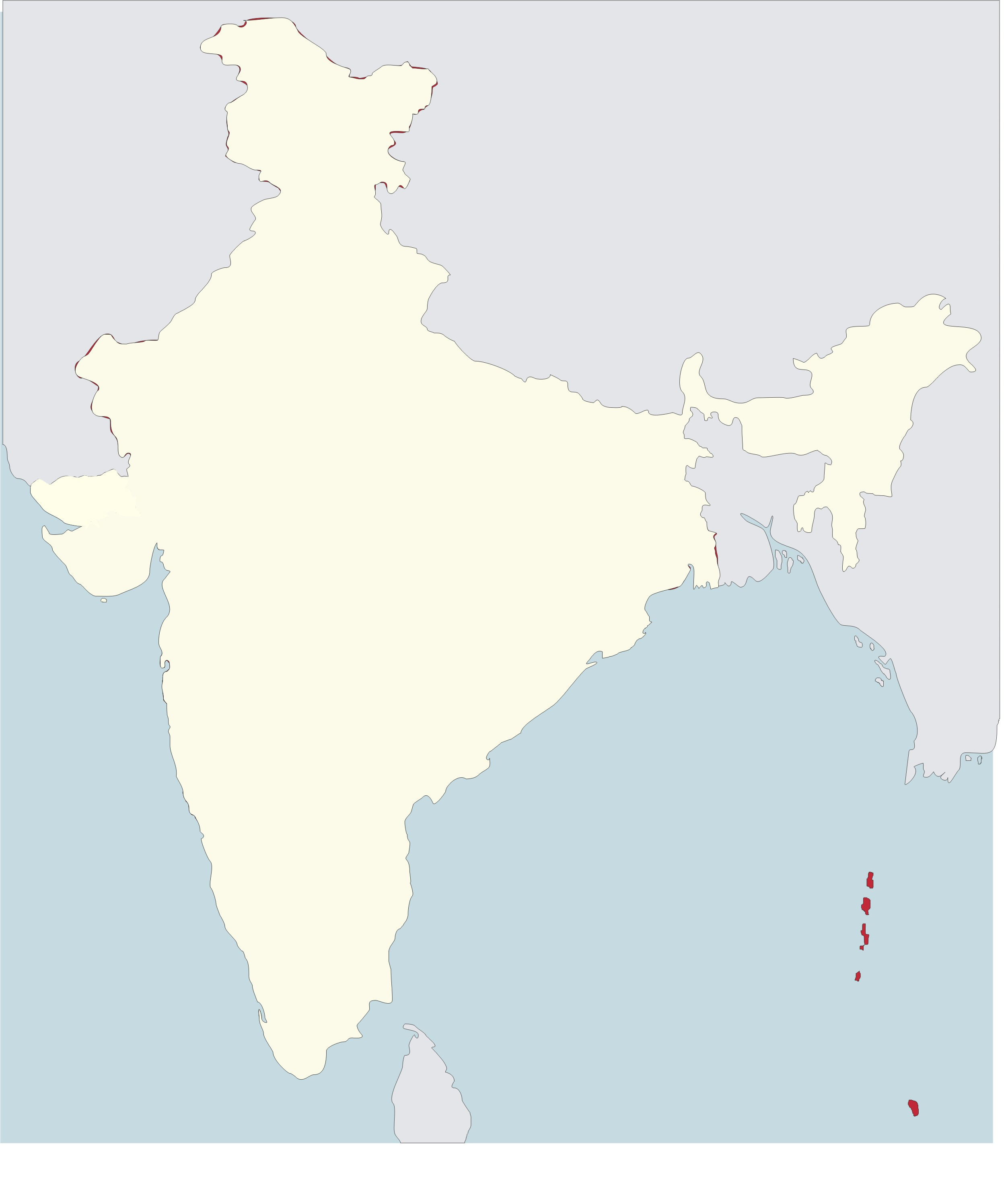
Map of the Roman Catholic Diocese of Port Blair in India

The Roman Catholic Diocese of Port Blair (Latin: Portus Blairen(sis)) is a diocese located in the city of Port Blair in the ecclesiastical province of Ranchi in India.

== History ==
- June 22, 1984: Established as Diocese of Port Blair from the Metropolitan Archdiocese of Ranchi

== Leadership ==
- Bishops of Port Blair (Latin Rite)
  - Bishop Aleixo das Neves Dias, S.F.X. (June 22, 1984 – January 6, 2019)
  - Bishop Visuvasam Selvaraj (June 29, 2021 – present)
