= Diocese of Chingleput =

Latin Catholic diocese in India

Coordinates: 12.6979°N 79.9757°E

Diocese of Chingleput Dioecesis Chingleputensis செங்கல்பட்டு மறைமாவட்ட
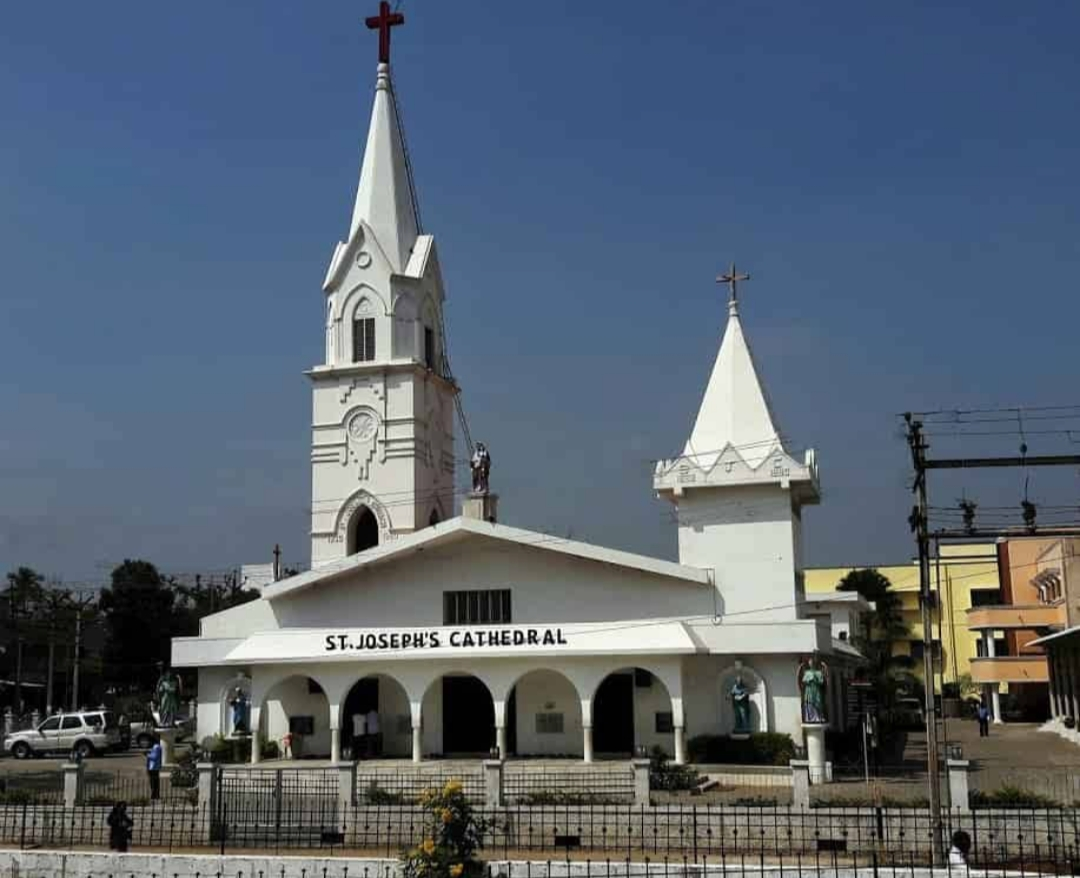

Location
- Country: India
- Ecclesiastical province: Madras and Mylapore

Statistics
- Area: 1,711 km^{2} (661 sq mi)
- Population: Total; Catholics: (as of 2006); 2,875,000; 126,951 (4.4%)
- Parishes: 110

Information
- Denomination: Catholic Church
- Sui iuris church: Latin Church
- Rite: Roman Rite
- Cathedral: Saint Joseph's Cathedral

Current leadership
- Pope: Leo XIV
- Bishop: Anthonisamy Neethinathan
- Metropolitan Archbishop: George Antonysamy

Website
- Website of the Diocese

The Diocese of Chingleput (Latin: Chingleputen(sis)) is a Latin Church ecclesiastical jurisdiction or diocese of the Catholic Church in India. Its episcopal see is Chingleput. The Diocese of Chingleput is a suffragan in the ecclesiastical province of the metropolitan Archdiocese of Madras and Mylapore.

== History ==
The diocese Diocese of Chingleput was established on July 19, 2002, from territory taken from the Archdiocese of Madras and Mylapore.

== Leadership ==
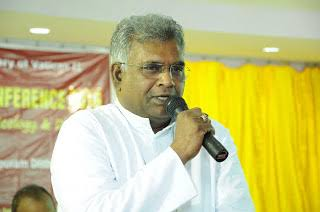
Bishop Anthonisamy Neethinathan

Bishop Anthonisamy Neethinathan is the first the current bishop of Chingleput in charge from July 19, 2002. Saint Joseph's Cathedral is the seat of power located in Chingleput. The bishop house is located in Thimmavaram Chingleput.

=== Bishop ===
- Bishops of Chingleput
  - Anthonisamy Neethinathan (July 19, 2002 – present)

== Shrines ==
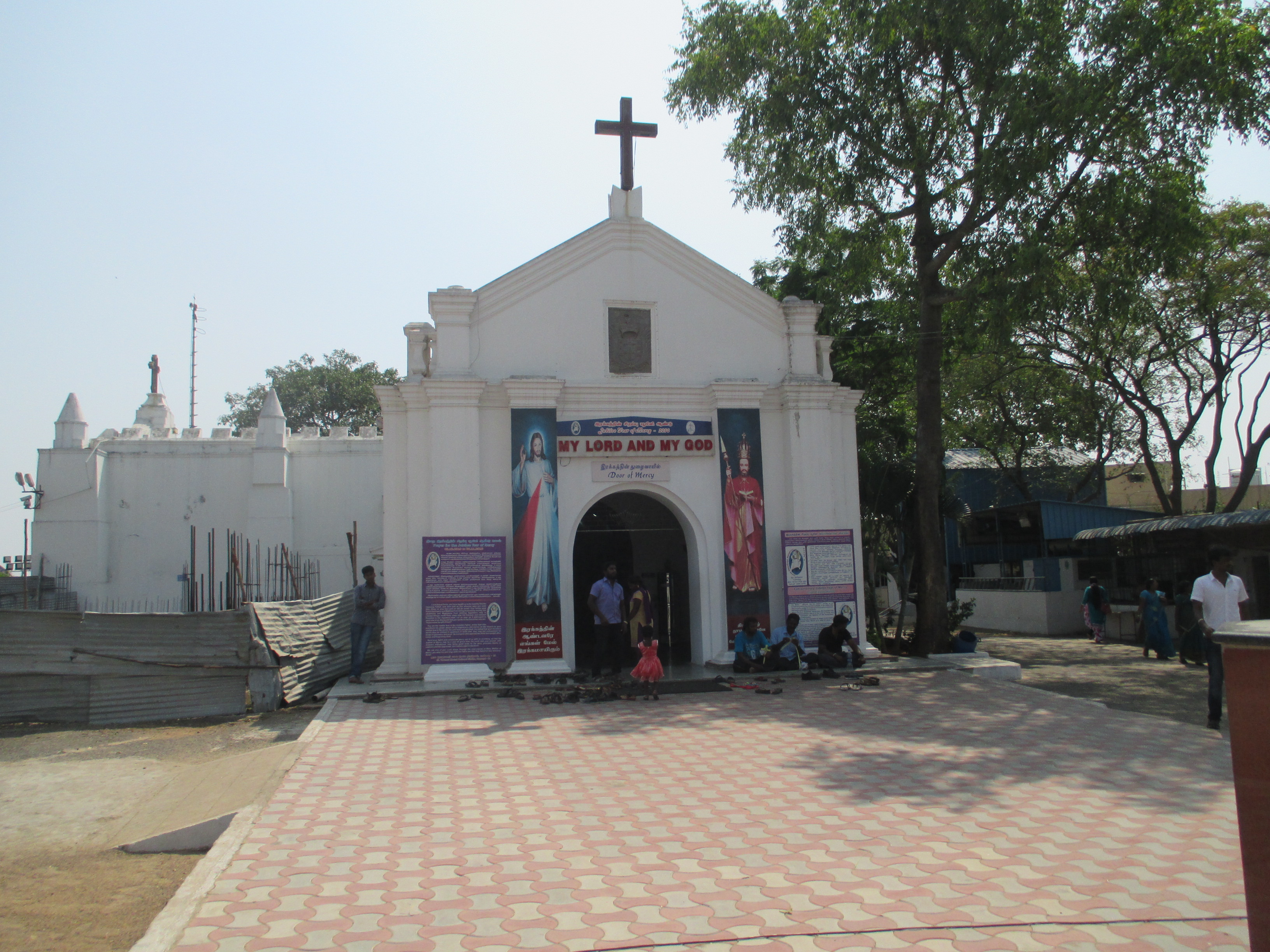
St.Thomas Mount Shrine

- St. Thomas National Shrine.
- Divine Mercy Hill Shrine – Chingleput.
- Mazhai Malai Madha Shrine – Acharapakkam.
- St. Antony’s Shrine – Palavakkam
- Our Lady of Fatima’s Shrine – Tambaram.
- Our Lady of Mount Carmel Shrine – Covelong (Kovalam).
- St. Jude’s Shrine – Vanuvampet

== Vicariates ==
There are 11 vicariates in the Chingleput diocese.

- Chingleput
- Cheyyur
- Covelong
- Kancheepuram
- Madurantagam
- Palavakkam
- Pallavaram
- Palliagaram
- St. Thomas Mount
- Tambaram
- Guduvancherry

== See also ==
- Chingleput District (Madras Presidency)
