= Diocese of Bagdogra =

Roman Catholic diocese in West Bengal, India

Coordinates: 26.7026°N 88.3179°E

Diocese of Bagdogra Dioecesis Bagdogranus बागडोगरा के सूबा

Location
- Country: India
- Ecclesiastical province: Calcutta
- Metropolitan: Calcutta

Statistics
- Area: 1,110 km^{2} (430 sq mi)
- Population: Total; Catholics: (as of 2023); 1,202,000; 60,200 (5.0%)
- Parishes: 20

Information
- Denomination: Catholic Church
- Sui iuris church: Latin Church
- Rite: Roman Rite
- Established: 14 June 1997; 29 years ago
- Cathedral: Cathedral of the Good Shepherd in Bagdogra
- Secular priests: 81 (41 Diocesan, 40 Religious Orders)

Current leadership
- Pope: Leo XIV
- Bishop: Paul Simick
- Metropolitan Archbishop: Elias Frank

The Roman Catholic Diocese of Bagdogra (Latin: Bagdogran(us)) is a suffragan Latin diocese in the ecclesiastical province of Calcutta in northeastern India, yet it depends on the missionary Roman Congregation for the Evangelization of Peoples.

Its episcopal see is the Cathedral of the Good Shepherd in the city of Bagdogra, West Bengal.

== History ==
- Established on 14 June 1997 as Diocese of Bagdogra, on territory split off from the Diocese of Darjeeling.

== Statistics ==
As of 2023, it pastorally served 60,200 Catholics (5.0% of 1,202,000 total) on 1,110 km² in 20 parishes with 81 priests (41 diocesan, 40 religious), and 197 lay religious (44 brothers, 153 sisters).

== Episcopal ordinaries ==
(all Latin Rite)

Suffragan Bishops of Bagdogra

- Thomas D'Souza (14 June 1997 – 12 March 2011), appointed Coadjutor Archbishop of Calcutta
- Vincent Aind (7 April 2015 – 30 December 2023), appointed Archbishop of Ranchi
- Paul Simick (9 November 2024 – Present)

Other Priests of this Diocese who became Bishop

- Clement Tirkey (1997-2006), appointed Bishop of Jalpaiguri

== See also ==
- List of Catholic dioceses

== Sources and external links ==
- GCatholic.org, with Google satellite photo - data for all sections ^{[self-published]}
- Catholic Hierarchy ^{[self-published]}
