= Roman Catholic Diocese of Bhagalpur =

Roman Catholic diocese in Bihar & Jharkhand, India

Coordinates: 25.2496°N 86.9484°E

Diocese of Bhagalpur Dioecesis Bhagalpurensis

catholic
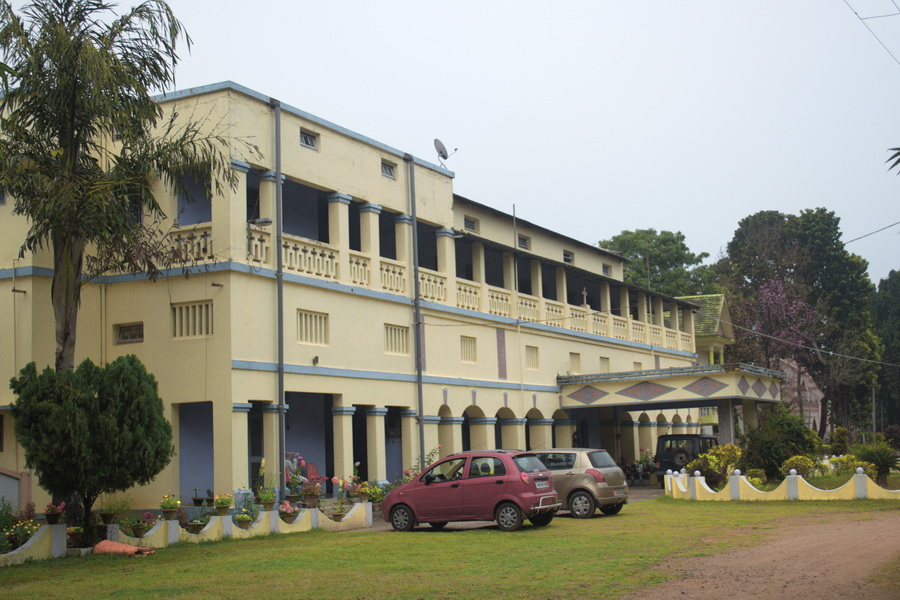
- This was the first building where the Christian Settlement at Bhagalpur Diocese began

Location
- Country: India
- Ecclesiastical province: Patna
- Metropolitan: Patna

Statistics
- Area: 17,766 km^{2} (6,859 sq mi)
- Population: Total; Catholics: (as of 2012); 9,446,000; 78,359 (0.8%)
- Parishes: 140
- Schools: 70

Information
- Rite: Latin Rite
- Cathedral: Cathedral of the Immaculate Conception in Bhagalpur

Current leadership
- Pope: Leo XIV
- Bishop: Kurian (Ciriaco) Valiakandathil
- Metropolitan Archbishop: William D'Souza

Website
- http://www.dioceseofbhagalpur.org/

The Roman Catholic Diocese of Bhagalpur (Latin: Bhagalpuren(sis)) is a diocese located in the city of Bhagalpur in the ecclesiastical province of Patna in India.

== History ==
Christian presence from 1779 has been documented. The early Christians were mainly indigo planters, railwaymen and their dependents. They did have a few handful of natives.

During the Capuchin period (1779–1919), Bhagalpur was at first the part of Prefecture of Tibet-Hindustan erected by the Sacred Congregation of the Evangelisation of the Peoples in 1703. It became a resident station in 1783.

The Jesuit period (1919–1983): The Patna Jesuits started working here in 1921. Their missionary efforts were directed mainly among the Santhals.

On 3 August 1956, Bhagalpur was detached from the Patna Diocese and the prefecture apostolic was established. Urban McGarry tor was appointed the prefect apostolic.

It was promoted as Diocese of Bhagalpur on 11 January 1965. Urban Eugene McGarry tor was appointed as its first bishop. The diocese comprised the districts of Bhagalpur, Banka, Jamui and the civil blocks of lakshmipur, Kharagpur and Tarapur of Mnger district of Bihar, Godda, Giridih, Deoghar and Sarawan of Deoghar district and Mandro block of Sahebgunj district of Jharkhand.

=== Jharkhand controversies ===
In July 2018, Sister Konsalia Balsa and charity worker Anima Indwar, who both served in the local Missionaries of Charity chapter, were arrested for selling a baby in Jharkhand they put up for adoption through Missionaries of Charity for $1750. Catholic property in Jharkhand falls under the jurisdiction of the Diocese of Bhagalpur.

On September 10, 2019, Crux reported that Father Benoy John and catechist Munna Hansda were part of an effort to forcibly convert locals in Jharkhand and were arrested on charges of forced conversion on September 6, 2019. Father Arun Vincent was also suspected of working with John and Hansda, but was not formally arrested and later released. Both John and Hansda were also revealed to have illegally occupied land to

== Leadership ==
- Bishops of Bhagalpur (Latin Rite)
  - Bishop Kurian (Ciriaco) Valiakandathil (11 January 2007 – present)
  - Bishop Thomas Kozhimala (14 June 1996 – 1 June 2005)
  - Bishop George Victor Saupin, S.J. (30 November 1987 – 2 August 1993)
  - Bishop Urban Eugen McGarry, T.O.R. (11 January 1965 – 30 November 1987)
- Prefects Apostolic of Bhagalpur (Latin Rite)
  - Fr. Urban Eugen McGarry, T.O.R. (later bishop) (1956 – 11 January 1965)

== Seminary ==
This seminary at Bhagalpur, Sahibgunj is the training center for the first two years of priesthood. A hostel is attached to the seminary where students live. To the right is the hostel and to the left is the seminary.

== Hospitals ==
There are 42 hospitals run by the Diocese of Bhagalpur. Punaruthanam Ashram at Sahebgunj is working for the Psychiatric patients of Bhagalpur

== Schools ==
There are more than 70 schools run by the Diocese of Bhagalpur. The most well known are St Joseph's School, Bhagalpur - Bhagalpur, Mount Assisi School - Bhagalpur, Mount Carmel School - Bhagalpur, St. Joseph's School - Kahalgaon, St. Teresa School - Bhagalpur, C.M.S. School - Bhagalpur, St. Paul's School Bhagalpur.

The list of schools is given here:

School	Location	Principal
Carmel School	Giridih	M. Basil
Mount Carmel School (Bhagalpur)	Bhagalpur	Carmine Marie
Mount Assisi School	Bhagalpur	Fr. Sivi Joseph
Mount Assisi School, Ranitalab	Bhagalpur	Fr. Kurien Thrikkodanmalil
Saint Francis School Deoghar	Deoghar	John Kochuchira
St. Thomas School, Godda	Godda	Valson
St. Joseph's School, Jhajha	Jamui	Mathew A.C.
St. Joseph's School, Kabirpur	Bhagalpur	Varghese Panangatt
St. Joseph's School, NTPC	Bhagalpur	Vincent Saldanha
St. Joseph's School, Pakartalla, Kahalgaon	Bhagalpur	Augustine Pereira
St. Francis Junior School, Jasidih	Deoghar	Sr. Caroline
St. Theresa's School	Bhagalpur	Sr. Scholastica
St. Theresa's School, Aliganj	Bhagalpur	Sr. Rosemeir
St. Joseph's School, Jagathpur	Banka	Joseph Thanniparampil

== Hostels ==
List of Boys hostels run by the Diocese of Bhagalpur

Hostel	Location
Sacred Heart Hostel, Babumahal	Banka
Savio Hostel, Baccha	Sahebganj
St. Joseph's Hostel, Baromasia	Godda.
St. Paul's Hostel, Bhalua	Jamui
St. Patrick's Hostel, Basmata	Banka.
St. Joseph's Hostel, Belatanr	Giridih
Sacred Heart Hostel, Chakai	Jamui
Prabhat Tara Hostel, Chandanahat	Godda
St. Theresa's Hostel, Charkapathar	Banka.
St. Joseph's Hostel, Chirkee	Giridih.
St. Joseph's Hostel, Dakaita	Godda.
St. Joseph's Hostel, Chirkee	Giridih.
Boys Hostel, Dambruhat	Godda
St. Mary's Hostel, Khorimahua	Giridih
St. Thomas's Hostel, Dulabitha	Giridih
St. Jude's Hostel, Dumaria	Banka.
Vianney Hostel, Giridih.	Giridih
Cannel English Medium School Hostel	Giridih.
Carmel Hindi Medium School Hostel	Giridih
St. Mary's Hostel, Agiamur	Godda
Krist Raja Hostel	Godda
St. Stanislaus Hostel, Gokhla	Bhagalpur
Prabhat Tara Hostel, Harimohra	Banka
Jhajha-Arunoday Hostel, Jhajha	Jamui.
St. Xavier's Hostel, Kharagpur	Munger.
St. Joseph's Hostel, Leela	Sahebganj
St. John Britto H.S.Hostel, Maheshmunda	Giridih
St. John Britto M.S.Hostel, Maheshmunda	Giridih
Infant Jesus Hostel, Mangra	Godda.
Mission Hostel, Manikbathan	Godda
St. Daniel's Hostel, Mariampahari	Jamui
St. Francis H. S. Hostel, Poreyahat	Godda
St. Francis M. S. Hostel, Poreyahat	Godda
St. Anthony's Hostel, Phulbaria	Godda
Pushpa Hostel, Sokho	Jamui
St. Thomas Hostel, Sundermur	Godda
St. Paul's Hostel, Thillaiya	Giridih
St. Anthony's Hostel, Tilkimaron	Giridih
Little Flower Hostel, Kusumba	Godda.
St. Mary's Hostel, Tisri	Giridih.

List of Girls hostels run by the Diocese of Bhagalpur

Hostel	Location
St. Mary's Hostel, Agiamur	Godda
Savio Hostel, Baccha	Sahebganj.
St. Joseph's Hostel, Baromasia	Godda.
St. Paul's Hostel, Bhalua	Jamui
St. Patrick's Hostel, Bhalua	Jamui.
St. Patricks's Hostel, Basmata	Banka.
Holy Cross Hostel, Belatanr	Giridih.
Sacred Heart Hostel, Chakai	Jamui
Holy Cross Hostel, Chandnahat	Godda.
Holy Family Hostel, Charkapathar	Banka
St. Joseph's Hostel, Chirky	Dt.Giridih
St. Joseph's Hostel, Dakaita	Godda
St. Joseph's Hostel, Dambruhat	Godda.
Maria Hostel, Khorimahua	Giridih
Holy Cross Hostel, Dulabitha	Giridih.
St. Jude's Hostel, Dumaria	Banka
St. Michael's H. S. Hostel, Gokhla	Bhagalpur
Nirmala H. S. Hostel, Harimohra	Banka
St. Francis Hostel, Kathibari	Godda
Xavier Hostel, Kharagpur	Munger.
St. Joseph's Hostel, Leela	Sahebganj.
Krist Raja Hostel, Godda.	Godda
St. Michael's M. S. Hostel, Gokhla	Bhagalpur.
Holy Family Hostel, Mangra	Godda
Holy Family Hostel, Mariampahari	Jamui
Holy Family Hostel, Poreyahat	Godda.
St. Anthony's Hostel, Phulbaria	Godda
Pushpa Hostel, Sokho	Jamui.
St. Thomas's Hostel, Sundermur	Godda.
St. Paul's Hostel, Thillaiya	Giridih.
St. Mary's Hostel, Tisri	Giridih
Little Flower Hostel, Kusumba	Godda
