= Diocese of Purnea =

Roman Catholic diocese in Bihar, India

Coordinates: 25.7733°N 87.4673°E

Diocese of Purnea Dioecesis Purneaensis

Location
- Country: India
- Ecclesiastical province: Patna
- Metropolitan: Patna

Statistics
- Area: 15,733 km^{2} (6,075 sq mi)
- Population: Total; Catholics: (as of 2004); 8,349,215; 24,391 (0.3%)

Information
- Rite: Latin Rite
- Cathedral: St. Peter’s Cathedral in Purnia

Current leadership
- Pope: Leo XIV
- Metropolitan Archbishop: Sebastian Kallupura
- Bishops emeritus: Angelus Kujur

The Roman Catholic Diocese of Purnea (Latin: Purneaen(sis)) is a diocese located in the city of Purnea in the ecclesiastical province of Patna in India.

== History ==
- 27 June 1998: Established as Diocese of Purnea from the Diocese of Dumka

== Bishops ==
- Vincent Barwa (27 June 1998 – 29 September 2004)
- Angelus Kujur (20 January 2007 – 8 December 2021)
