= Archdiocese of Patna =

Latin Catholic archdiocese in India

Coordinates: 25.6422°N 85.1010°E

Archdiocese of Patna Archidioecesis Patnensis

Location
- Country: India
- Ecclesiastical province: Patna

Statistics
- Area: 28,808 km^{2} (11,123 sq mi)
- Population: Total; Catholics: (as of 2005); 24,709,333; 54,120 (0.2%)

Information
- Denomination: Catholic Church
- Sui iuris church: Latin Church
- Rite: Roman Rite
- Established: 10 September 1919
- Cathedral: Queen of Apostles Cathedral in Patna
- Co-cathedral: Pro-Cathedral of St Joseph in Patna
- Patron saint: Saint Joseph

Current leadership
- Pope: Leo XIV
- Metropolitan Archbishop: Archbishop Sebastian Kallupura

The Archdiocese of Patna (Latin: Patnen(sis)) is a Latin Church ecclesiastical jurisdiction or archdiocese of the Catholic Church in India. Its episcopal see is Patna, in the state of Bihar. A metropolitan see, the archdiocese has five suffragan dioceses in its ecclesiastical province.

== History ==
The first Catholic missionary to the state of Bihar was the Jesuit priest Simon Figueredo SJ, who arrived in Patna in 1620 at the invitation of the Mughal Governor, Yohan Maquarrum Khan.

The Congregation for the Propagation of Faith erected the Prefecture of Tibet - Hindustan in 1703 and entrusted it to the Capuchin Fathers of the Italian Province of Picenum in the Marches of Ancona. The first group of fathers reached Lhasa (Tibet) in 1707 and began Church work there. For nearly 41 years, the Capuchin Fathers worked in Lhasa until a religious persecution forced them to give up their mission and move to Kathmandu (Nepal) in 1745. They were then invited to Bettiah and founded a mission there.

Nepal had seen the Capuchin Fathers working with varying success in Kathmandu since 1715. A new conqueror of Kathmandu valley, Raja Pritvi Narayan, who was not sympathetic to the Fathers stopped all support to them. The Mission of Nepal was also abandoned in 1769, and the Fathers with 62 Nepalese Christians and five catechumens moved to India. The Nepalese Christians and catechumens settled down at Chuhari near Bettiah. The scene of the capuchin Mission shifted now to the Indian soil. Fr Joseph Mary OFM cap, a saintly priest, founded the Bettiah Mission in 1745 after the King of Bettiah, Raja Druva Singh had obtained permission from Pope Benedict XIV.

Rome erected the Prefecture of Tibet-Hindustan into a Vicariate in 1812. In 1827 an Independent Patna Vicariate was created, comprising Bettiah, Chuhari, Patna City, Dinapore, Bhagalpur, Darjeeling, Sikkim, Nepal, and adjacent territories. Anastasius Hartmann, was appointed its first Vicar Apostolic Bishop in 1845; a decree from Pope Leo XIII led to Patna becoming a part of Allahabad diocese in 1886. The North Bihar Mission with its four stations of Bettiah, Chuhari, Chakhani and Latonah was entrusted to the Tyrolese Capuchins in 1886. In May 1892 the North Bihar Mission became the Bettiah-Nepal Prefecture with Fr Hilarion of Abtei, OFM cap, as its first Prefect. In 1919 this Prefecture was dissolved and joined to South Bihar to form the present Diocese of Patna.

Pope Benedict XV by a Decree on 10 September 1919 divided the Diocese of Allahabad into two. The Diocese of Patna was thus created. The Prefecture of Bettiah-Nepal was annexed to the new diocese. The Holy See entrusted Patna diocese to American Missouri Province of the Society of Jesus. Later, on 13 November 1930, after the division of Missouri Province, Patna diocese was entrusted to the Chicago Province of the Society of Jesus. Louis Van Hoeck, a Belgian Jesuit, was ordained the first Bishop of Patna on 6 March 1921. Bernard Sullivan SJ became the second Bishop of Patna (1929-1947), Augustine Wildermuth SJ was the third Bishop of Patna (1947-1980) and Benedict Osta SJ was the last bishop before Patna was elevated to an Archdiocese in 1999.

The Third Order Regular (T.O.R.) Franciscan Fathers from Pennsylvania, USA came to Patna diocese to assist the Jesuits in 1938. The mission stations of Bhagalpur, Gokhla, Poreyahat and Godda were assigned to them. In 1956 Bhagalpur was made a Prefecture and in 1965 it was created a Diocese with Msgr Urban McGarry, T.O.R., as its First Bishop.

The forbidden Kingdom of Nepal was once again open for Fathers in 1951, thanks to the efforts of Fr. Marshall D. Moran, S.J. Nepal was made an independent ecclesiastical unit in 1984 and Fr. Antony Sharma, S.J. was appointed as its First Mission Superior.

On 28 March 1980, Pope John Paul II, accepted the resignation of Bishop Augustine Wildermuth S.J., and divided the Patna diocese into two units: Patna and Muzaffarpur. Fr Benedict J Osta S.J., was appointed Bishop of Patna.

In 1999, Patna was elevated to an Archdiocese and Bishop Benedict J Osta S.J., became the first Archbishop of Patna; on Osta’s retirement in 2007, Bishop William D'Souza SJ became the new Archbishop. On 9 December 2020 D’Souza's resignation was accepted by Pope Francis, and auxiliary bishop Sebastian Kallupura was named as his successor. Bishop Sebastian Kallupura took on the post of Archbishop of Patna in December 2020.

The Diocese of Patna comprises in the State of Bihar, the Districts of Patna, Nalanda, Nawadah, Gaya, Aurangabad, Rohtas, Jehanabad, Bhojpur, Bhabhua, Buxar and part of Munger.

== Special churches ==
- Pro-Cathedral:
  - St Joseph's Pro-Cathedral, Patna

== Leadership ==
- Archbishops of Patna
  - Coadjutor Archbishop Sebastian Kallupura (9 December 2020 - present)
  - Archbishop William D’Souza, S.J. (1 October 2007 – 9 December 2020)
  - Archbishop Benedict John Osta, S.J. (76) (16 March 1999 – 1 October 2007)
- Bishops of Patna (Latn Rite)
  - Bishop Benedict John Osta, S.J. (76) (later Archbishop) (6 March 1980 – 16 March 1999)
  - Bishop Augustine Francis Wildermuth, S.J. (12 June 1947 – 6 March 1980)
  - Bishop Bernard James Sullivan, S.J. (15 January 1929 – 6 June 1946)
  - Bishop Louis van Hoeck, S.J. (20 July 1920 – 15 February 1928)
- Vicars Apostolic of Patna
  - Bishop Francis Pesci, O.F.M. Cap. (24 May 1881 – 1 September 1886)

== Suffragan dioceses ==
- Diocese of Bettiah
- Diocese of Bhagalpur
- Diocese of Buxar
- Diocese of Muzaffarpur
- Diocese of Purnea

== Saints and causes for canonisation ==
- Ven. Anastasius Hartmann, Apostolic Vicar of Patna
