= Diocese of Muzaffarpur =

Latin Catholic diocese in Bihar, India

Coordinates: 26.1200°N 85.3769°E

Diocese of Muzaffarpur Dioecesis Muzaffarpurensis

Location
- Country: India
- Ecclesiastical province: Patna

Statistics
- Area: 27,120 km^{2} (10,470 sq mi)
- Population: Total; Catholics: (as of 2004); 29,436,742; 4,638 (0.0%)

Information
- Denomination: Catholic Church
- Sui iuris church: Latin Church
- Rite: Roman Rite
- Established: 6 March 1980
- Cathedral: Cathedral of St Francis Assisi in Muzaffarpur

Current leadership
- Pope: Leo XIV
- Bishop: Cajetan Francis Osta
- Metropolitan Archbishop: William D'Souza

Map
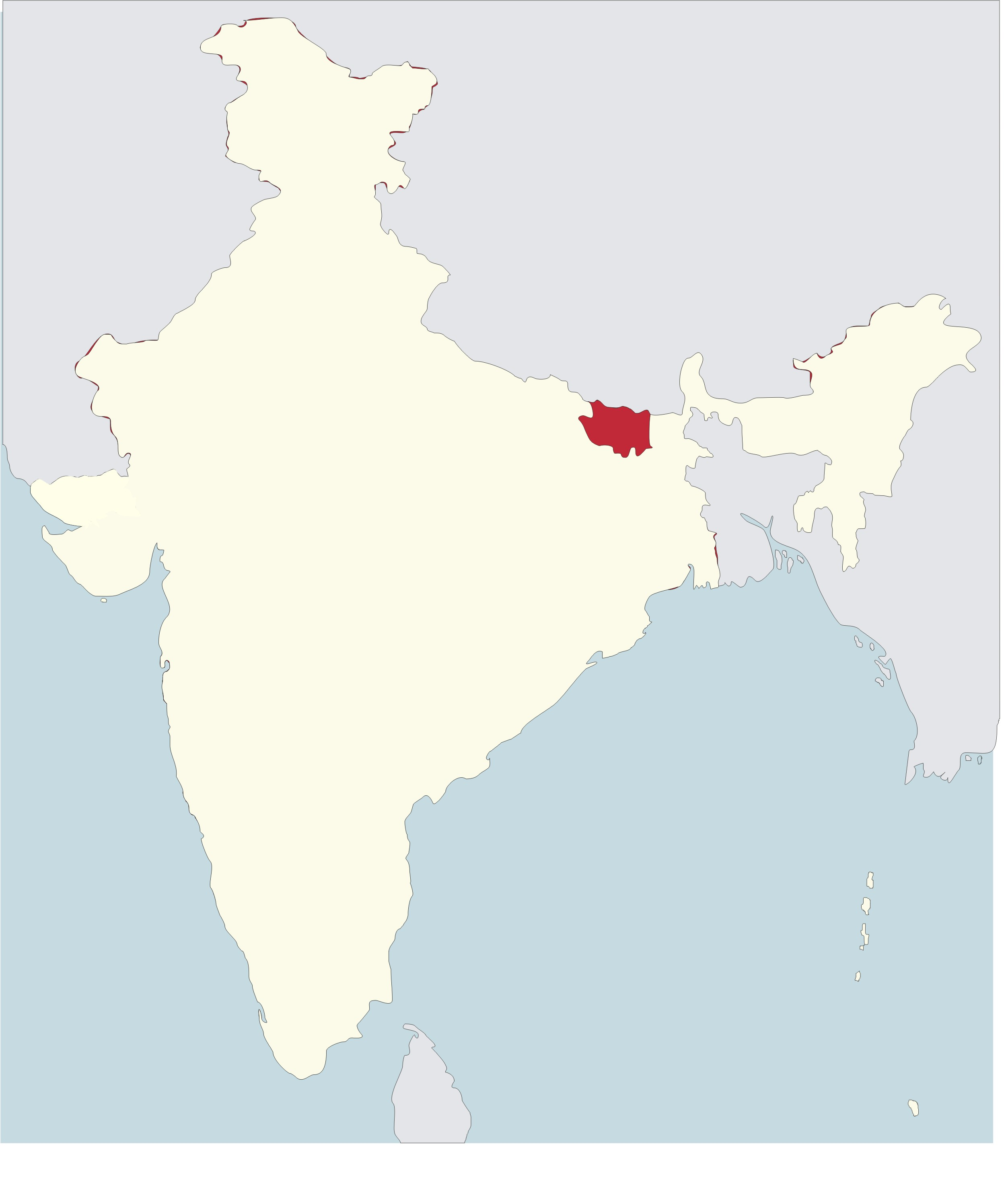

The Diocese of Muzaffarpur (Latin: Muzaffarpuren(sis)) is a diocese located in the city of Muzaffarpur in the ecclesiastical province of Patna in India.

== History ==
- March 6, 1980: Established as Diocese of Muzaffarpur from the Diocese of Patna.

== Leadership ==
- Bishops of Muzaffarpur
  - Bishop John Baptist Thakur, S.J. (March 6, 1980 – July 11, 2014)
  - Bishop Cajetan Francis Osta (July 11, 2014 – present)
