= Christianity in Odisha =

Christianity in Indian state

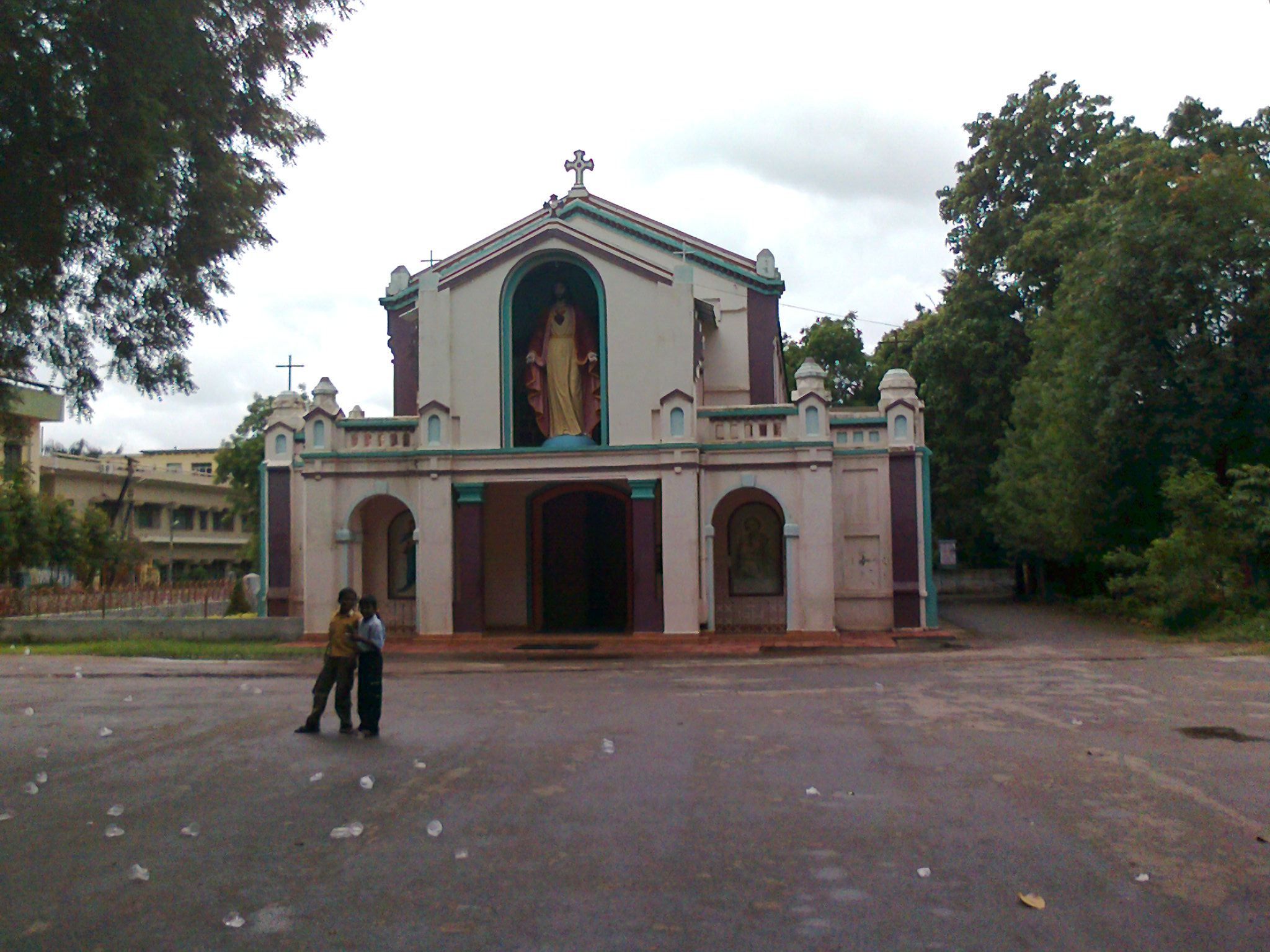
The Cathedral Of The Sacred Heart is a Roman Catholic cathedral belonging to the Roman Catholic Diocese of Rourkela and one of the oldest church buildings in Rourkela.

Followers of Christianity are a significant minority in Odisha state of India. According to the 2011 Census, Christians make up about 2.77% of the population (about 1,160,000 people). Kurukh, Sora, Kharia and Panos are notable ethnic groups with a significant Christian population.

== History ==
=== Bible translations into Odia ===
The first version in the Odia language of India was translated by William Carey in 1808 and was distributed among pilgrims at Puri to introduce them to Christianity. Then came the standard version by Amos Sutton in the 1840s.

== Demographics ==
Christianity in Odisha
Year	Pop.	±%
1951	141,934	—
1961	201,017	+41.6%
1971	378,888	+88.5%
1981	480,426	+26.8%
1991	666,220	+38.7%
2001	897,861	+34.8%
2011	1,161,708	+29.4%

According to the 2011 Census of India, Odisha had 1,161,708 Christians, constituting 2.77% of the state's population. Odisha had the eighth-largest Christian population among India's states and union territories, accounting for approximately 4.18% of India's total Christian population of 27,819,588. Of Odisha's Christian population, 83.93% lived in rural areas and 16.07% lived in urban areas. The Christian population had a sex ratio of 1,035 females per 1,000 males, compared with 978 females per 1,000 males for Odisha's total population.

Christian population by district in Odisha, 2011
District	Population	Christian population	Christians (% of district population)	Share of Odisha's Christian population
Bargarh	1,481,255	11,744	0.79%	1.01%
Jharsuguda	579,505	10,462	1.81%	0.90%
Sambalpur	1,041,099	50,637	4.86%	4.36%
Debagarh	312,520	14,518	4.65%	1.25%
Sundargarh	2,093,437	385,011	18.39%	33.14%
Kendujhar	1,801,733	9,141	0.51%	0.79%
Mayurbhanj	2,519,738	15,008	0.60%	1.29%
Baleshwar	2,320,529	6,434	0.28%	0.55%
Bhadrak	1,506,337	745	0.05%	0.06%
Kendrapara	1,440,361	1,423	0.10%	0.12%
Jagatsinghapur	1,136,971	1,604	0.14%	0.14%
Cuttack	2,624,470	11,985	0.46%	1.03%
Jajapur	1,827,192	1,623	0.09%	0.14%
Dhenkanal	1,192,811	727	0.06%	0.06%
Angul	1,273,821	3,383	0.27%	0.29%
Nayagarh	962,789	383	0.04%	0.03%
Khordha	2,251,673	12,527	0.56%	1.08%
Puri	1,698,730	4,239	0.25%	0.36%
Ganjam	3,529,031	23,975	0.68%	2.06%
Gajapati	577,817	219,482	37.98%	18.89%
Kandhamal	733,110	148,895	20.31%	12.82%
Boudh	441,162	522	0.12%	0.04%
Subarnapur	610,183	2,374	0.39%	0.20%
Balangir	1,648,997	16,271	0.99%	1.40%
Nuapada	610,382	1,778	0.29%	0.15%
Kalahandi	1,576,869	11,160	0.71%	0.96%
Rayagada	967,911	84,916	8.77%	7.31%
Koraput	1,379,647	68,550	4.97%	5.90%
Malkangiri	613,192	10,039	1.64%	0.86%
Nabarangpur	1,220,946	32,152	2.63%	2.77%
Odisha	41,974,218	1,161,708	2.77%	100.00%

Christianity among social group of Odisha, 2011 census
1. Scheduled Tribes (70.3%)
2. General (incl. converted Scheduled Castes) population (29.7%)

The Christians are mostly from the adivasi or tribal communities of the state with 816,981 (70.33%) Christians among STs. The major tribes are as below with number of Christians and percentage of Christians in each tribe.

Tribe	Christians	Percent
Munda	1,74,119	31.1%
Khond	1,59,783	9.8%
Oraon	1,49,866	41.8%
Soura	1,36,369	25.5%
Kharia	87,069	39.1%
Sabar	37,933	7.3%
Kisan	25,675	7.7%

=== Places with the largest proportions ===
The figures indicate percentage of Christians within the districts:

- Gajapati
  - Serango– 84%
  - Adava– 75%
  - R.Udayagiri– 50%
  - Damadua- 70%
  - Aligonda- 90%
- Kandhamal
  - Brahmanigaon– 72%
  - Daringbadi– 64%
  - Kotagarh– 58%
- Sundargarh
  - Raiboga– 62%
- Rayagada
  - Puttasing– 80%
  - Chandrapur– 51%

== Denominations ==
Church of God (Anderson), Evangelical Missionary Society in Mayurbhanj and Jeypore Evangelical Lutheran Church are among the Protestant denominations of Odisha. Christ Church the full Gospel Church, Gospel Outreach Ministries, India Evangelistic Association, Orissa Baptist Evangelistic Crusade and The Pentecostal Mission are among the non-Catholic denominations of Odisha as well. The Church of North India is present in Odisha as well with the dioceses of Cuttack, Phulbani, and Sambalpur. The diocese of Chota Nagpur also serves a small part of Odisha.

== Roman Catholic Church ==
The archbishop of Roman Catholic Archdiocese of Cuttack-Bhubaneswar is Archbishop John Barwa. Its suffragan dioceses are:

- Balasore
- Berhampur
- Rourkela
- Sambalpur
- Rayagada

== See also ==
- Christianity in India
- Christian Revival Church
