= Niranjan Sual Singh =

Indian priest (born 1961)

Most Reverend Niranjan Sual Singh
- Bishop of Sambalpur
- Archdiocese: Cuttack-Bhubaneswar
- See: Sambalpur
- Appointed: 26 July 2013
- Installed: 28 September 2013
- Predecessor: Lukas Kerketta S.V.D.
- Previous posts: Professor at the Khristo Jyoti Mohavidyaloyo Regional Theologate of Sason, Moderator of seminarians in the Roman Catholic Archdiocese of Cuttack-Bhubaneswar

Orders
- Ordination: 29 April 1991
- Consecration: 28 September 2013 by Salvatore Pennacchio

Personal details
- Born: 20 July 1961 (age 65) Kottamam, Kerala, India
- Denomination: Roman Catholic
- Education: Pontifical Urban University
- Motto: UNITED IN LOVE AND SERVICE

Niranjan Sual Singh (born 20 July 1961) is the serving bishop of the Roman Catholic Diocese of Sambalpur, India.

== Early life and education ==
He was born in Kottama, India on 20 July 1961 to Mr. Ambrose Sual Singh & Mrs. Bastina Sual Singh. He holds a doctorate in theology from the Pontifical Urban University, Rome.

== Priesthood ==
He was ordained a priest on 29 April 1991.

== Episcopate ==
He succeeded Bishop Lukas Kerketta, S.V.D., and was appointed by the pope on 26 July 2013 and ordained on 28 September 2013.

== See also ==
List of Catholic bishops of India
