= Kishore Kumar Kujur =

Indian Roman Catholic bishop (born 1964)

Most Reverend Kishore Kumar Kujur
- Bishop of Rourkela
- Archdiocese: Cuttack-Bhubaneswar
- Diocese: Rourkela
- Appointed: 26 July 2013
- Predecessor: Bishop Alphonse Bilung, S.V.D.
- Successor: Incumbent

Orders
- Ordination: 7 February 1993
- Consecration: 29 September 2013 by Telesphore Toppo

Personal details
- Born: 6 January 1964 (age 62) Gaibira Odisha India
- Denomination: Roman Catholic
- Education: Pontifical Biblical Institute; Pontifical University of Saint Thomas Aquinas
- Motto: THE MYSTERY OF FAITH

Bishop Kishore Kumar Kujur is the current serving bishop of the Roman Catholic Diocese of Rourkela, India.

== Early life and education ==
Kujur was born on 6 January 1964 in Gaibira, Odisha, India. He studied at Saint Francis de Sales College. He joined the Minor Seminary in Sambalpur and then St. John's Regional Seminary. He completed his studies in philosophy at St. Charles Seminary, Nagpur. He completed his studies in theology from the Khristo Jyoti Mohavidyaloyo, Sason. He has also acquired a Bachelor of Arts degree and a Licentiate from Pontifical Biblical Institute and a Doctorate in Sacred Scripture from Pontifical University of Saint Thomas Aquinas.

== Priesthood ==
On 7 February 1993, Kujur was ordained a catholic priest for the Roman Catholic Diocese of Sambalpur.

== Episcopate ==
Kujur was appointed bishop of the Roman Catholic Diocese of Rourkela on 26 July 2013 by Pope Francis and consecrated a bishop by Telesphore Placidus Cardinal Toppo on 29 September 2013.

His episcopal motto is : THE MYSTERY OF FAITH

== See also ==
- List of Catholic bishops of India
- Roman Catholic Diocese of Rourkela
