= Diocese of Sambalpur =

Diocese of Sambalpur may refer to:

- Roman Catholic Diocese of Sambalpur
- Diocese of Sambalpur (Church of North India)
