= Sacred Heart Cathedral, Rourkela =

Coordinates: 22.268889°N 84.862778°E

Sacred Heart Cathedral
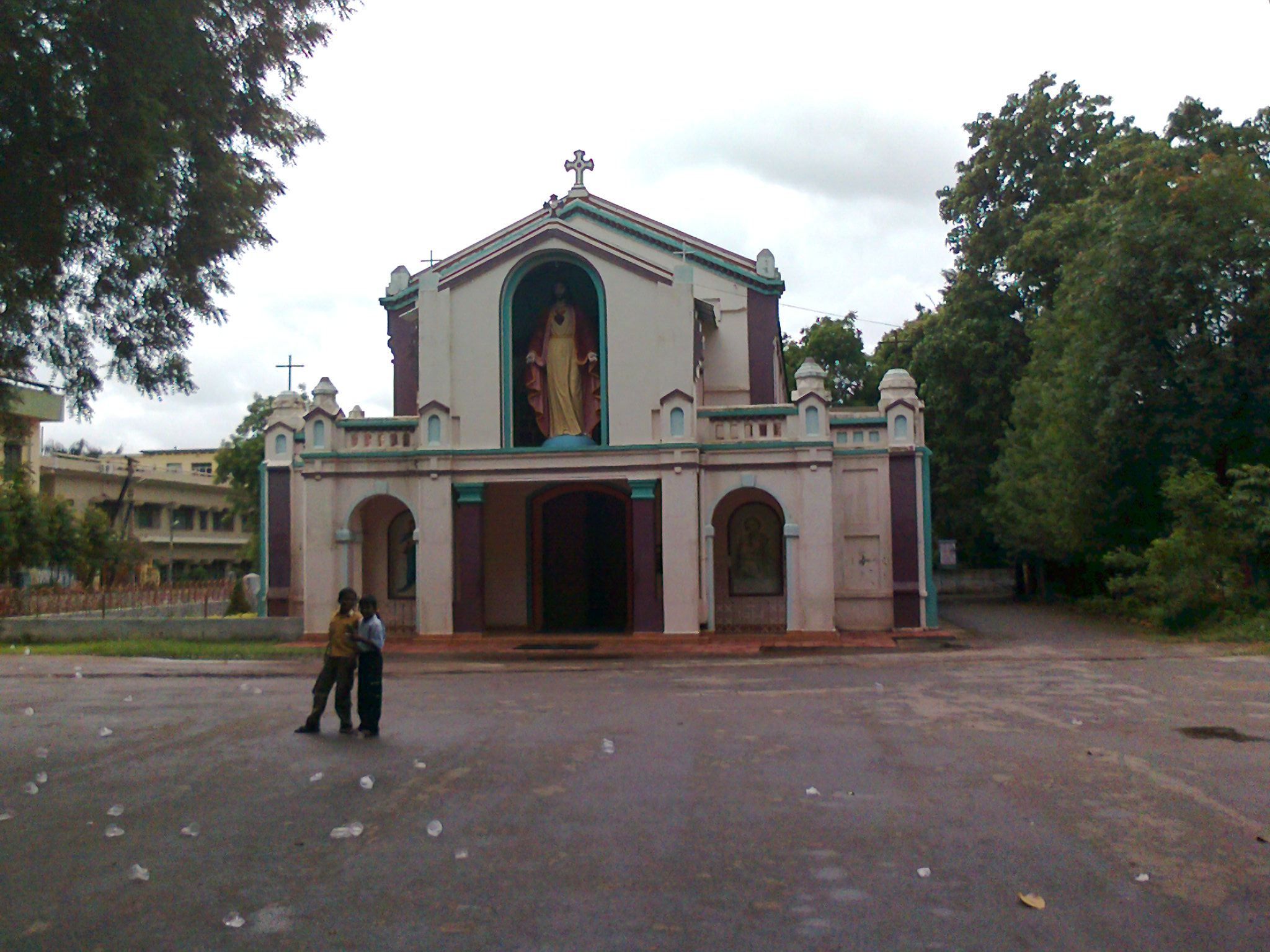
- Sacred Heart Cathedral
- Location: Hamirpur, Rourkela
- Country: India
- Denomination: Roman Catholic

History
- Status: Cathedral

Architecture
- Functional status: Active

Administration
- Diocese: Roman Catholic Diocese of Rourkela

Clergy
- Bishop: Kishore Kumar Kujur
- Priest: Fr.Petrus Barwa

The Cathedral Of The Sacred Heart is a Roman Catholic cathedral belonging to the Roman Catholic Diocese of Rourkela and one of the oldest church buildings in Rourkela, India. Together with St. Pauls's School, St. Joseph's School, Carmel School and Hamirpur High School. Christian religious services are held throughout the year.

== History ==
In Hamirpur, Rourkela church was first established in 1918 after establishment of church in Keshramal in 1908 by Society of Jesus priests. This mission was called as Gangpur Mission. Initially this church was part of Sambalpur Diocese it became cathedral of Sambalpur Diocese succeeding kalunga in 1964 and eventually became the cathedral of Rourkela Diocese in 1979 when Sambalpur diocese was bifurcated and Rourkela Diocese was formed.

== Service Timings ==
Winter Timings (October - March): Worship at 6:30 a.m.

Summer Timings (April - September): Worship at 6:00 a.m.

== Services & Celebration ==
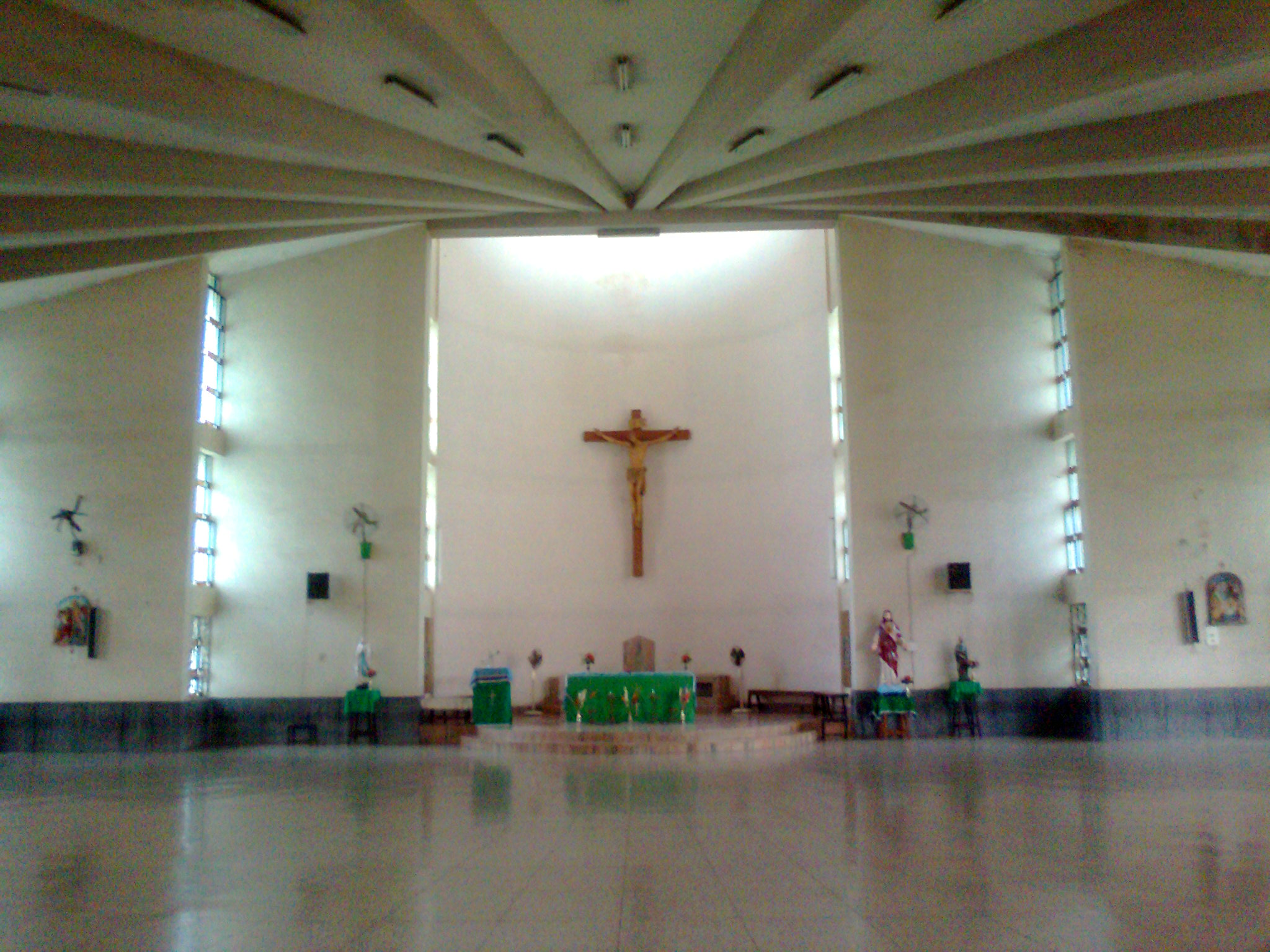
Interior of Sacred Heart Church Hamirpur (New Church), Rourkela

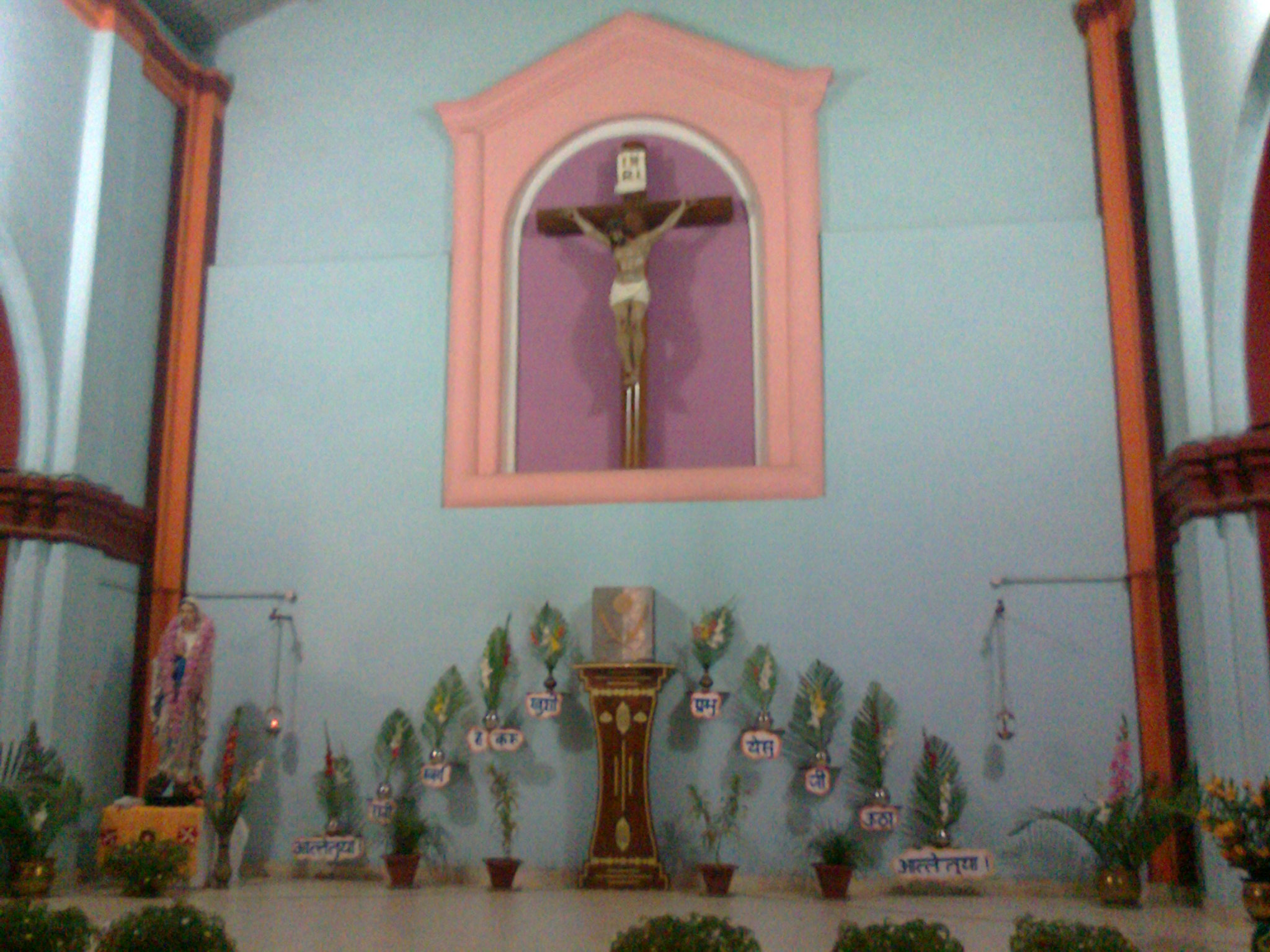
Interior of Sacred Heart Church Hamirpur (Old Church), Rourkela

The Cathedral organizes functions on certain days of the year. Prayers are held in the morning and evening every day. The major ceremonies held at the Cathedral are Easter and Christmas. The most important of the festivities during Christmas is the Feast of the Holy Family of Nazareth and the Christmas Vigil Service an hour before midnight Christmas Eve.
