= Diocese of Cuttack =

Diocese of Cuttack may refer to:

- Roman Catholic Archdiocese of Cuttack-Bhubaneswar (former Diocese of Cuttack)
- Diocese of Cuttack (Church of North India)
