= Lucas Kerketta =

Indian clergyman and auxiliary bishop (born 1936)

Lucas Kerketta SVD
- Bishop Emeritus of Sambalpur
- Church: Catholic Church
- Diocese: Diocese of Sambalpur
- In office: 17 November 1986 – 26 July 2013
- Predecessor: Raphael Cheenath
- Successor: Niranjan Sual Singh

Orders
- Ordination: 25 October 1969
- Consecration: 1 March 1987 by Raphael Cheenath

Personal details
- Born: 20 September 1936 (age 89) Kahupani (east of Thethaitangar), Orissa Province, British Raj, British Empire

Lucas Kerketta (born 20 September 1936 in Kahupani, Thethaitangar block) is an Indian clergyman and auxiliary bishop for the Roman Catholic Diocese of Sambalpur. He became ordained in 1969. He was appointed bishop in 1986. He retired in 2013.
