= Kerketta =

Kerketta is a surname. Notable people with the surname include:

- Lucas Kerketta (born 1936), Indian clergyman and auxiliary bishop
- Robert Kerketta (1932–2018), Indian Roman Catholic bishop
- Rose Kerketta (1940–2025), Indian writer, poet, thinker, and tribal rights activist
- Sushila Kerketta (1939–2009), Indian politician
- Jacinta Kerketta (born 1983), Indian journalist, poet and activist
