= Diocese of Rayagada =

Roman Catholic diocese in Orissa, India

Coordinates: 19.1675°N 83.4081°E

Diocese of Rayagada Rayagaden/sis

Location
- Country: India
- Ecclesiastical province: Cuttack-Bhubaneswar

Statistics
- Area: 39,368.4 km^{2} (15,200.2 sq mi)
- Population: Total; Catholics: 5407894; 50542
- Parishes: 23

Information
- Sui iuris church: Latin Church
- Rite: Roman Rite
- Established: 11 April 2016
- Cathedral: Queen of the Mission Cathedral
- Secular priests: 35

Current leadership
- Pope: Leo XIV
- Bishop: Aplinar Senapati, CM
- Metropolitan Archbishop: John Barwa, S.V.D.

Map
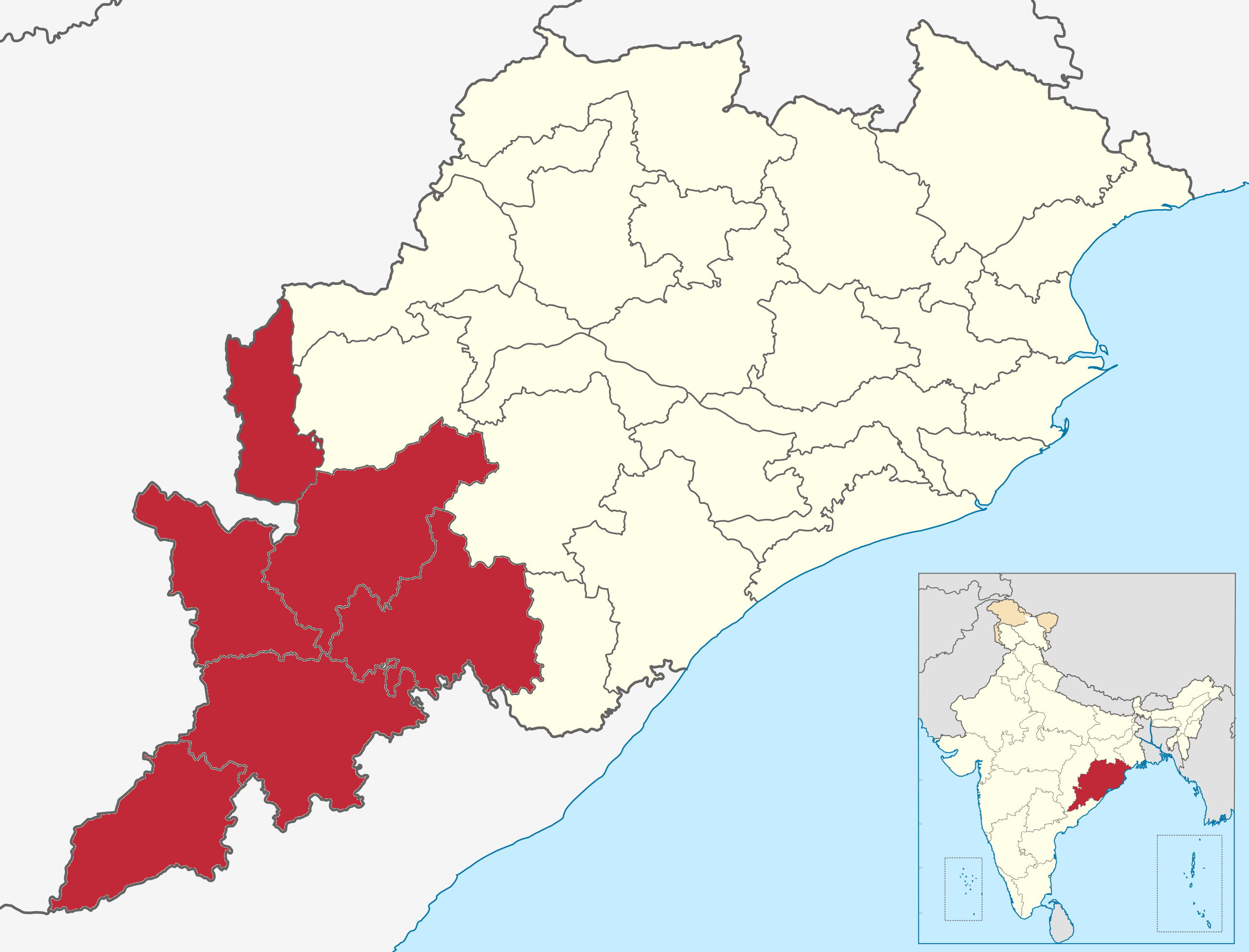

The Roman Catholic Diocese of Rayagada is a diocese located in the Indian state of Orissa (Odisha). It was created, with territory taken from the Roman Catholic Diocese of Berhampur (in Berhampur, India), on 11 April 2016 by Pope Francis. It is headquartered in the see city of Rayagada, and will be a suffragan see in the Province of the Roman Catholic Archdiocese of Cuttack-Bhubaneswar (based in the cities of Cuttack and the provincial capital of Bhubaneswar).

== Governance ==
The Reverend Father Aplinar Senapati, CM was appointed its first Bishop, and will receive episcopal ordination and then be installed as bishop at a date or dates in the near future to be determined. According to the Vatican's news release about the erection of the new Diocese, Bishop-elect Senapati was born in Surada, India, in 1960. Bishop-elect Senapati professed his religious vows with the Congregation of the Mission in 1989, and then was ordained a priest in 1990. He holds master's degrees in economics and in philosophy, and has served in a number of roles including parochial vicar, teacher, parish priest, and as Master of Novices. He is currently the Pastor of St. Vincent De Paul Parish, and President of the English Medium School in Derapathar, Guwahati.

== See also ==
- Catholic Church in India
