= Diocese of Balasore =

Roman Catholic diocese in Orissa, India

Coordinates: 21.4962°N 86.9334°E

Diocese of Balasore Dioecesis Balasorensis

Location
- Country: India
- Ecclesiastical province: Cuttack–Bhubaneswar
- Metropolitan: Cuttack–Bhubaneswar

Statistics
- Area: 25,118 km^{2} (9,698 sq mi)
- Population: Total; Catholics: (as of 2012); 8,974,200; 23,643 (0.3%)
- Parishes: 39

Information
- Rite: Latin Rite
- Cathedral: Christ the King Cathedral, Balasore
- Patron saint: Christ the King

Current leadership
- Pope: Leo XIV
- Bishop: Varghese Thottamkara
- Metropolitan Archbishop: John Barwa
- Bishops emeritus: Thomas Thiruthalil Bishop Emeritus (1989-2013)

Map
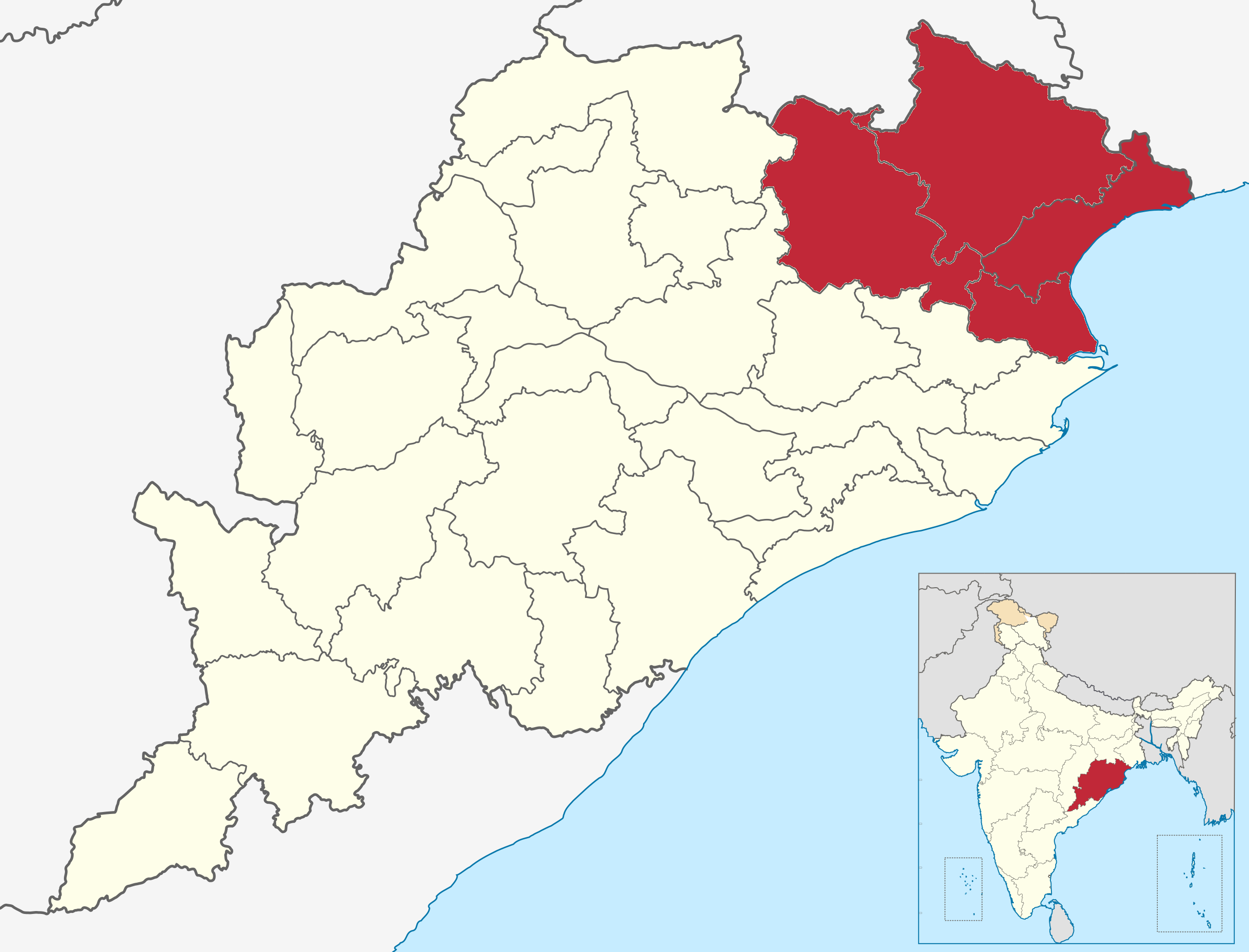

Website
- Website of the Diocese

The Roman Catholic Diocese of Balasore (Latin: Balasoren(sis)) is a diocese located in the city of Balasore in the ecclesiastical province of Cuttack–Bhubaneswar in India.

On Monday, 9 December 2013, Pope Francis accepted the resignation from the pastoral governance of the Roman Catholic Diocese of Balasore, presented by Bishop Thomas Thiruthalil, CM, in accordance with Canon 401.1 of the Latin Rite 1983 Code of Canon Law. Pope Francis appointed as Bishop-elect of the Roman Catholic Diocese of Balasore, the Reverend Father Simon Kaipuram, C.M., who until then had been serving as dean and professor of Aquinas College of Gopalpur, India, in the Roman Catholic Diocese of Berhampur (based in Berhampur, India).

== History ==
- 8 June 1968: Established as the Apostolic Prefecture of Balasore from the Roman Catholic Archdiocese of Calcutta
- 18 December 1989: Promoted as Diocese of Balasore

== Leadership ==
- Bishops of Balasore (Latin Rite)
  - Bishop Varghese Thottamkara, C.M. (10 May 2023 – Present)
  - Bishop Simon Kaipuram, C.M. (9 December 2013 – 22 April 2019)
  - Bishop Thomas Thiruthalil, C.M. (18 December 1989 – 9 December 2013), retired
  - Father Jacob Vadakevetil, C.M. (Apostolic Administrator, 14 June 1968 – 1989)
