= Sarat Chandra Nayak =

Indian Catholic Bishop

Most Reverend Dr. Sarat Chandra Nayak
- Bishop of Berhampur
- Native name: ଶରତ ଚନ୍ଦ୍ର ନାୟକ |
- See: Berhampur
- Appointed: 27 November 2006
- Installed: 30 January 2007
- Predecessor: Joseph Das
- Other posts: Chairman of the Communication, Laity, and Scheduled Caste & Scheduled Tribes commissions for the Orissa Bishops' Council
- Previous post: Chancellor of Cuttack-Bhubaneswar

Orders
- Ordination: 25 April 1990
- Consecration: 30 January 2007 by Pedro López Quintana

Personal details
- Born: 1 July 1957 (age 69) Kerubadi, Odisha, India
- Denomination: Roman Catholic
- Residence: Bishop's House, Berhampur Dt. Ganjam, Orissa - 760 001 India
- Motto: "To be a happy servant."

Bishop Sarat Chandra Nayak (born 1 July 1957) is a current bishop of Roman Catholic Diocese of Berhampur in Odisha, India.

== Early life ==
Sarat was born on 1 July 1957 in Kerubadi, Odisha, India.

== Priesthood ==
He was Ordained a Catholic Priest on 25 April 1990.

== Episcopate ==
He was appointed Bishop on 27 November 2006 and Ordained on 30 January 2007 by Pedro López Quintana. He was recently appointed Chairman of the Communication, Laity, and Scheduled Caste & Scheduled Tribes commissions for the Orissa Bishops' Council by CBCI.

Catholic Church titles
Preceded by Joseph Das	Bishop of Berhampur; 2006 -	Succeeded by incumbent

== See also ==
List of Catholic bishops of India
