= Simon Kaipuram =

Indian Roman Catholic bishop (1954–2019)

Simon Kaipuram CM
- Bishop of Balasore
- Church: Catholic Church
- Diocese: Diocese of Balasore
- In office: 9 December 2013 – 22 April 2019
- Predecessor: Thomas Thiruthalil
- Successor: Varghese Thottamkara

Orders
- Ordination: 2 May 1979
- Consecration: 30 January 2014 by Salvatore Pennacchio

Personal details
- Born: 9 February 1954 Thanneermukkom, State of Travancore–Cochin, India
- Died: 22 April 2019 (aged 65) Balasore, Odisha, India

Simon Kaipuram (9 February 1954 – 22 April 2019) was an Indian Roman Catholic bishop.

Kaipuram was born in India and was ordained to the priesthood in 1980. He served as bishop of the Roman Catholic Diocese of Balasore from 2013 until his death in 2019.
