= Raphael Cheenath =

Raphael Cheenath SVD
- Archbishop of Cuttack-Bhubaneswar
- Church: Catholic Church
- Archdiocese: Archdiocese of Cuttack-Bhubaneswar
- In office: 1 July 1985 – 11 February 2011
- Predecessor: Henry Sebastian D'Souza
- Successor: John Barwa
- Previous post: Diocese of Sambalpur (1974-1985)

Orders
- Ordination: 21 September 1963
- Consecration: 18 May 1974 by Hermann Westermann

Personal details
- Born: 29 December 1934
- Died: 14 August 2016 (aged 81) Andheri, Mumbai, Maharashtra, India

Raphael Cheenath (29 December 1934 – 14 August 2016) was the archbishop of Cuttack-Bhubaneswar, India. He was ordained a priest of the Society of the Divine Word on 21 September 1963 and appointed bishop of Sambalpur, India on 28 February 1974. He was appointed archbishop of Cuttack-Bhubaneswar on 1 July 1985 and retired on 11 February 2011. Cheenath died on 14 August 2016 at Holy Spirit Hospital in Mumbai.
