= Kottamam =

- City
- Location in Kerala, India Kottamam (India)
- Coordinates: 10°10′41″N 76°27′34″E
- Country: India
- State: Kerala
- District: Ernakulam

Languages
  - Official: Malayalam, English
- Time zone: UTC+5:30 (IST)
- PIN: 683574
- Nearest city: Kalady
- Lok Sabha constituency: chalakudy

Kottamam is a city situated in the banks of the holy river Periyar in Ernakulam district, Kerala state, south India. It is situated about 9.5 km from Angamaly and 3 km from Kalady, the birthplace of Adi Sankaracharya. The International pilgrim center Malayattoor Kurisumudi is situated only 7.5 km from Kottamam. Cochin International Airport is situated only 9 km from Kottamam.

Kottamam is famous for the fest of St Rocky (Saint Roch) which is celebrated on first Sunday of January month every year.

== Others ==
These are the religious places in Kottamam: St.Joseph's Church and St. Rocky's Chapel.

In Kottamam there is one LP school, St. Joseph's LPS Kottamam, and one High School, SNDP HSS Neeleeswaram.

A convention center is also available at Kottamam, St. Joseph's Parish Hall.

There are many clubs in Kottamam such as Y's Men Club of Kottamam, Mahatma Arts Club, National Club which are actively involved in social service and welfare activities of the society.

Angamaly Urban Bank and State Bank of India have a branch in Kottamam Junction.

- Post Office - Neeleeswaram (Kalady Sub). The PIN Code is changed from 683584 to 683574
- Nearest railway station - Angamaly - Station Code AFK
- Airport - Cochin International Airport (COK) at Nedumbassery is 9 km from Kottamam.
