= Diocese of Rourkela =

Roman Catholic diocese in Orissa, India

Coordinates: 22.2687°N 84.8629°E

Diocese of Rourkela Dioecesis Rurkelaënsis
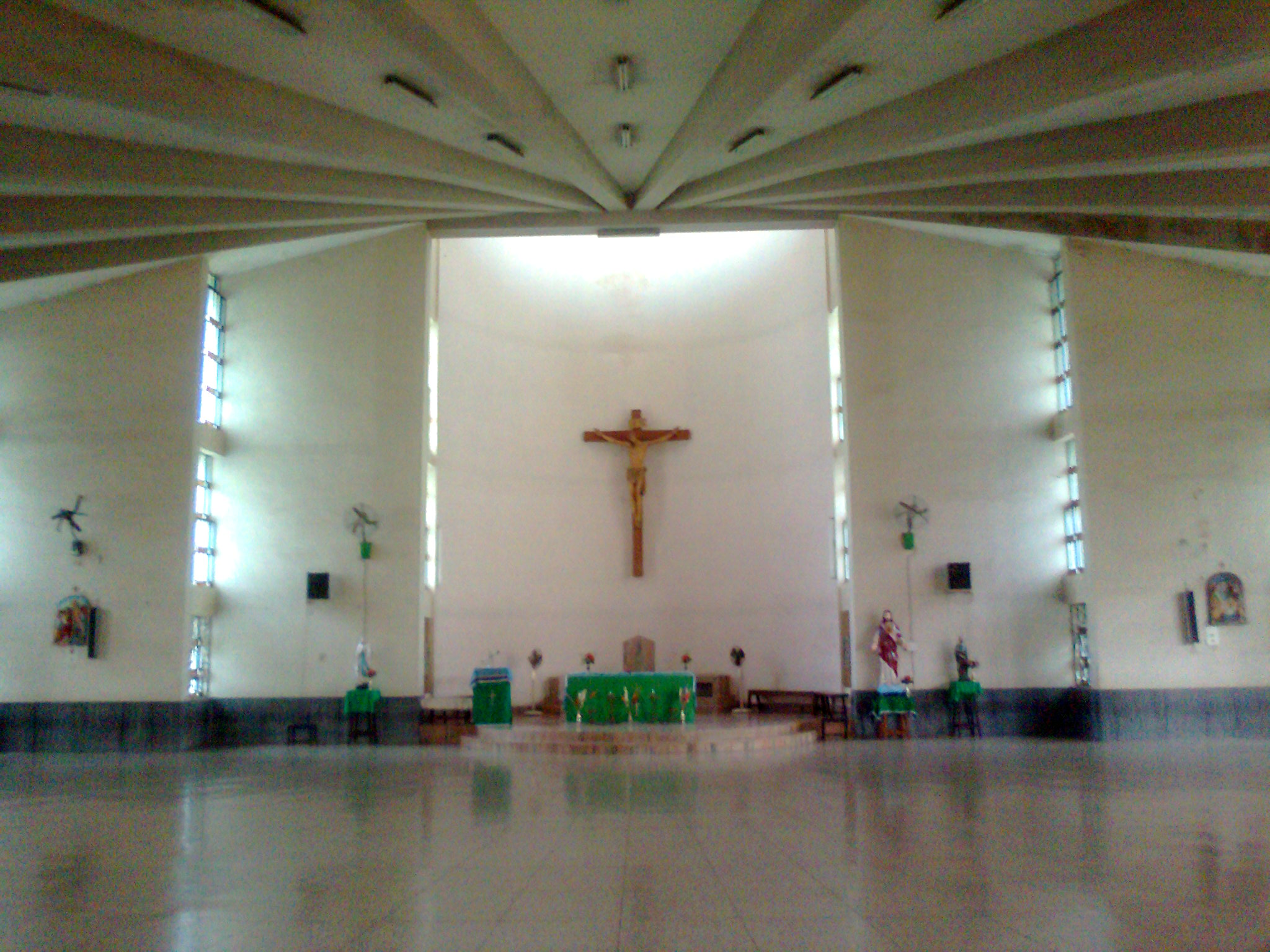
- Interior of Sacred Heart Church Hamirpur (New Church), Rourkela

Location
- Country: India
- Ecclesiastical province: Cuttack–Bhubaneswar
- Metropolitan: Cuttack–Bhubaneswar

Statistics
- Area: 9,675 km^{2} (3,736 sq mi)
- Population: Total; Catholics: (as of 2020); 2,182,000; 270,817 (12.4%)

Information
- Rite: Latin Rite
- Established: 4 July 1979
- Cathedral: Sacred Heart Cathedral, Rourkela

Current leadership
- Pope: Leo XIV
- Bishop: Kishore Kumar Kujur
- Metropolitan Archbishop: John Barwa SVD

The Roman Catholic Diocese of Rourkela (Latin: Rurkelaën(sis)) is a diocese located in the city of Rourkela in the ecclesiastical province of Cuttack-Bhubaneswar in India.

== History ==
- 4 July 1979: Established as Diocese of Rourkela from the Diocese of Sambalpur
- The Diocese of Rourkela was created by the Papal Bull "cum Cordi" dated 4 July 1979 by taking the entire civil district of Sundargarh from the diocese of Sambalpur in Orissa. At the time of erection of Rourkela, the diocese of Sambalpur, erected in 1951, comprised the four Orissa districts of Sundargarh, Sambalpur, Bolangir and Dhenkanal.

The new diocese of Rourkela is bounded on the north by Archdiocese of Ranchi and on the South by the diocese of Sambalpur to the west and the north-west lies the diocese of Raigarh, while the diocese of Jamshedpur and Balasore lie to the east and South-East.

Jesuit Missionaries began evangelization of this part of the Chotanagpur Mission, Fr Constant Livens (1856–1893) being the most prominent among them. After the Second World War, the Jesuits faced two major problems - personnel and finance. They, therefore, requested the Divine Word Missionaries (SVD) who had been working in the neighbouring states of Central India since 1932, to take up the Gangpur Mission in Northern Orissa. The SVDs set their feet in this mission land in 1948. The Late Bishop Herman Westermann, SVD, who had several years of experience in Central India, was ordained the first Bishop of Sambalpur in 1951. During his tenure as well as that of Bishop Raphael Cheenath, SVD (1974–1979), mission work in this ecclesiastical territory progressed in leaps and bounds.

Rt. Rev. Alphonse Billung, S.V.D. was appointed the first Bishop of Rourkela on 3 November 1979. Today the Diocese of Rourkela owes a lot to the relentless zeal and indefatigable labour of these eminent personalities, and their co - Missionaries - Priests, Brothers, Sisters, Lay people, generous benefactors and all well-wishers.

== Leadership ==
- Bishops of Rourkela (Latin Rite)
  - Bishop Kishore Kumar Kujur (26 July 2013 – present)

== Statistics ==
Statistical Overview

Area: 9675 km^{2}.

Total Population: 19,25,000

Catholics: 2,72,453

Personal

Bishop: 1

Retired Bishop: 1

Diocesan Priests :85

Religious Priests: 96

Religious Brother: 250

Religious Sisters: 421

Seminarians: 25

Parishes

Total Number of Parishes: 42

Institutes

Ecclesiastical/Formation Centers: 12

Junior Colleges:5

High Schools:5

Middle Schools:1

Primary Schools:151

Vocational Training Centers: 4

== Parishes ==
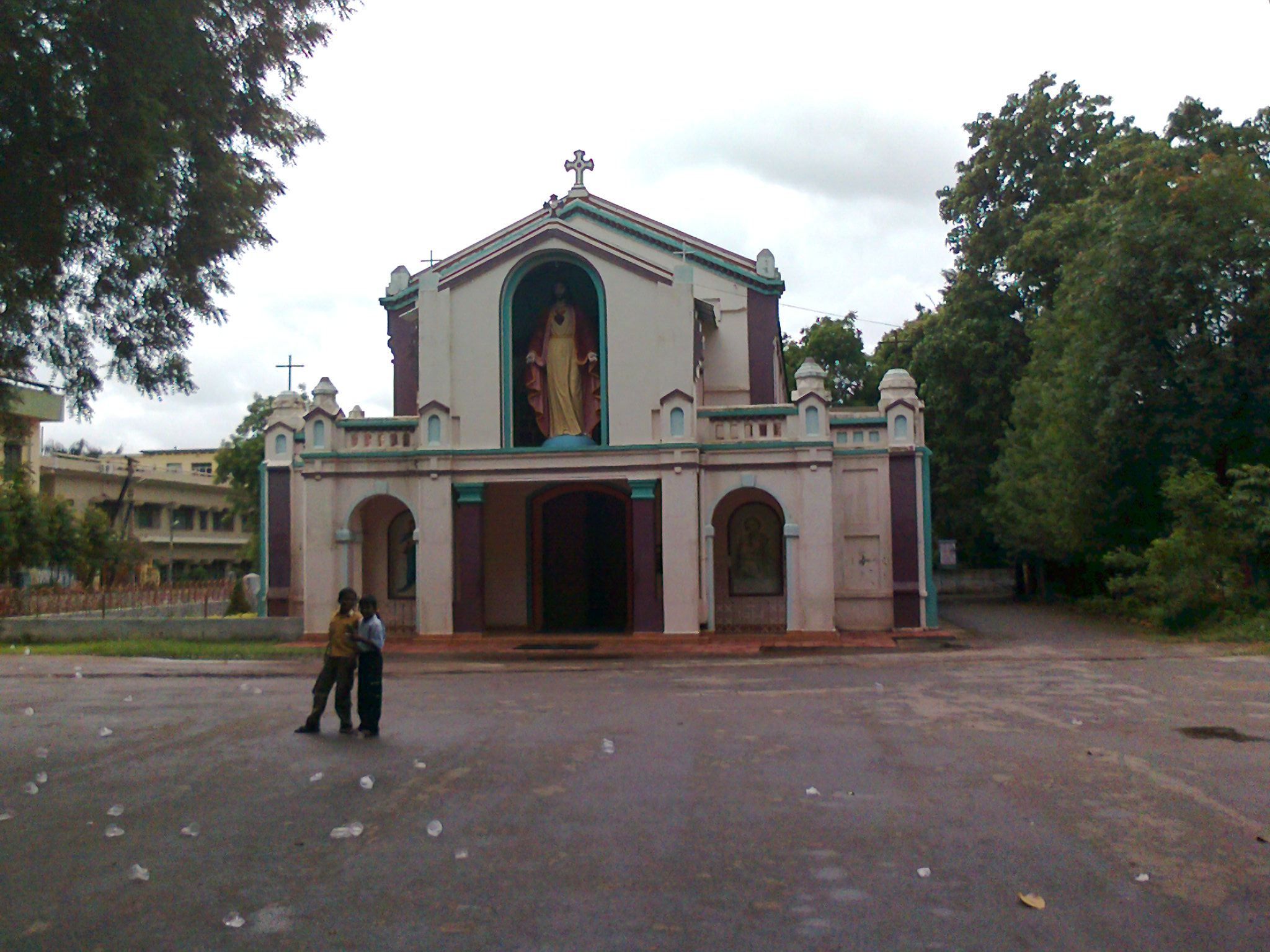
Sacred Heart Church Hamirpur (Old Church), Rourkela

There are 44 parishes in the Diocese of Rourkela.

1. Ambapani Parish, St Joseph Church (Estd:1997)
2. Bamahanmara Parish
3. Barilapta Parish, St Mary's Church (1959)
4. Barsuan Parish, St Thomas Church (1972)
5. Bihabandh Parish
6. Birmitrapur Parish, St Paul's Church (1950)
7. Bonaigarh Parish, Prabhu Prakash Church (1985)
8. Bondamunda Parish, Good Shepherd Church (1968)
9. Deonapara Parish, St Francis Xavier Church (2003)
10. Gaibira Parish, St Ignatius Church (1922)
11. Ghoghea Parish, St John the Baptist Church (1974)
12. Gomardih Parish, St Mary's Church (1968)
13. Hamirpur Parish, Sacred Heart Cathedral (1918)
14. Harasmara Parish, St Francis of Assisi Church (1992)
15. Hemgir Parish, St Francis Xavier Church (1995)
16. Jhirpani parish, Immaculate Conception Church (2014)
17. Jhorabahal Parish, Holy Trinity Church (1961)
18. Jhunmur Parish, St Mary's Church (1925)
19. Jolda Parish, Christ The King Church (1968)
20. Kahuchuan Parish, St Mary's Church (2001)
21. Kahupani Parish, St Mary's Church (1972)
22. Kalunga Parish, Risen Christ Church (1951)
23. Kansbahal Parish, St Joseph The Worker Church (1981)
24. Kantapali Parish, Holy Family Church (1953)
25. Kesramal Parish, St Francis Xavier Church (1908)
26. Kirelega Parish, St Mary's Church (1977)
27. Koira Parish, St Francis Assisi Church (2001)
28. Kuarmunda Parish, St John Bosco Church (1988)
29. Kusumdegi Parish, Our Lady Assumed into Heaven (1929)
30. Nuagaon Parish, All Saints Church (2000)
31. Pankadih Parish, Catholic Church (1996)
32. Pandrepali Parish, St. Francis De Sales Church (1993)
33. Phalsa Parish, St Thomas Church (1961)
34. Raidih Parish, St Peters Church (1995)
35. Rajgangpur Parish, St Mary's Church (1961)
36. Salangabahal Parish, St Thomas The Apostle Church (1972)
37. Saunamara Parish, Jagat Mata Church (1998)
38. Siabahal Parish, St Vincent Palloti Church (1995)
39. Sikajor Parish, St Joseph Church (1966)
40. Singarmunda Parish, St Mary's Church (1968)
41. Sundargarh Parish, St Mary's Church (1952)
42. Tangrain parish, St Francis Xavier Church (2010)
43. Telendih Parish, St Josephs Church (1957)
44. Thakurpali Parish, Our Lady of Holy Rosary Church (1979)

== Religious Congregation working in the diocese ==
=== Religious Men ===
1. Congregation of Rosarian (CR)
2. Congregation of the Most Holy Redeemer (CSSR)
3. Missionaries of Saint Francis De Sales (MSFS)
4. Order of Friars Minor Capuchins (OFM Cap)
5. Society of Mary (Marianists)|Society of Mary (SM)
6. Society of St Francis De Sales (Salesians of Don Bosco) (SDB)
7. Society of the Catholic Apostolate (Pallottines)(SAC)
8. Divine Word Missionaries|Society of the Divine Word (SVD)
9. Third Order Regular of St. Francis (TOR)
10. Society of Jesus - (Jesuits)(SJ)

=== Religious Brothers ===
1. Missionaries of Charity Brothers (MC)
2. Missionaries of the Poor (MOP)

=== Religious Sisters ===
1. Apostolic Carmel (AC)
2. Carmelite Missionaries (CM)
3. Congregation of Sisters of St Joseph of Chambéry (CSJ)
4. Daughters of the Cross (FC)
5. Franciscan Sisters of St Mary of the Angels (FSMA)
6. Handmaids of Mary (HM)
7. Handmaids of the Sacred Heart of Jesus (ACI)
8. Missionaries of Charity (MC)
9. Missionary Sisters of the Catholic Apostolate (SAC)
10. Missionary Sisters of the Queen of the Apostles (SAR)
11. Missionary Sisters Servants of the Holy Spirit (SSPS)
12. Saint Joseph Sevika Sanstha (SJS)
13. Sisters of Mercy of the Holy Cross (SCSC)
14. Sisters of St Joseph of Lyon (SJL)
15. Sisters of St Joseph of Saint-Marc (SJSM)
16. Ursuline Sisters of Tildonk (OSU)
