= John Barwa =

Roman Catholic archbishop

The Most Reverend John Barwa S.V.D
- Archbishop of Cuttack-Bhubaneswar
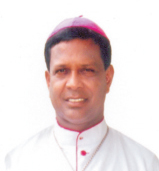
- Archbishop John Barwa
- Native name: ଜନ ବାରୱା |
- Archdiocese: Roman Catholic Archdiocese of Cuttack-Bhubaneswar
- See: Roman Catholic Archdiocese of Cuttack-Bhubaneswar
- Appointed: 11 February 2011
- Installed: 11 February 2011
- Predecessor: Raphael Cheenath
- Successor: "Incumbent"
- Previous post: Coadjutor Bishop of Roman Catholic Diocese of Rourkela

Orders
- Ordination: 14 April 1985
- Consecration: 19 April 2006 by Telesphore Toppo

Personal details
- Born: 1 June 1955 (age 71) Gaibira, Sundargarh Odisha, India
- Residence: Archbishop's House, Bhubaneswar 751007 Orissa
- Education: Pontifical Atheneum of St. Anselm
- Motto: GIVE ME A HEART TO LOVE

Styles of John Barwa
- Reference style: The Most Reverend
- Spoken style: Your Grace
- Religious style: Monsignor
- Posthumous style: not applicable

Archbishop John Barwa, S.V.D. is the serving Archbishop of the Roman Catholic Archdiocese of Cuttack-Bhubaneswar.

== Early life and education ==
Barwa was born in Gaibira, Sundargarh district Odisha, India, on 1 June 1955. He holds a licentiate in Liturgy from the Pontifical Atheneum of St. Anselm.

== Priesthood ==
Barwa was ordained a Catholic priest of Society of the Divine Word on 14 April 1985.

== Episcopate ==
Rev. John Barwa was appointed Coadjutor Bishop of Rourkela on 4 Feb 2006 and ordained a Bishop on 19 April 2006 by Telesphore Toppo. He succeeded as a bishop of Roman Catholic Diocese of Rourkela started on 2 April 2009. He was appointed Archbishop of Roman Catholic Archdiocese of Cuttack-Bhubaneswar on 11 February 2011 by Pope Benedict XVI.

Catholic Church titles
Preceded by Raphael Cheenath	Archbishop of Cuttack-Bhubaneswar; 2011	Succeeded by Incumbent

== See also ==
- List of Catholic bishops of India
