= Diocese of Berhampur =

Roman Catholic diocese in Orissa, India

Coordinates: 19.3129°N 84.7950°E

Diocese of Berhampur Dioecesis Berhampurensis

Location
- Country: India
- Ecclesiastical province: Cuttack–Bhubaneswar
- Metropolitan: Cuttack–Bhubaneswar

Statistics
- Area: 51,289 km^{2} (19,803 sq mi)
- Population: Total; Catholics: (as of 2012); 9,161,000; 125,241 (1.4%)
- Parishes: 43

Information
- Rite: Latin Rite
- Established: 24 January 1974
- Cathedral: Cathedral of the Queen of the Missions in Brahmapur, Odisha

Current leadership
- Pope: Leo XIV
- Bishop: Sarat Chandra Nayak
- Metropolitan Archbishop: John Barwa

Map
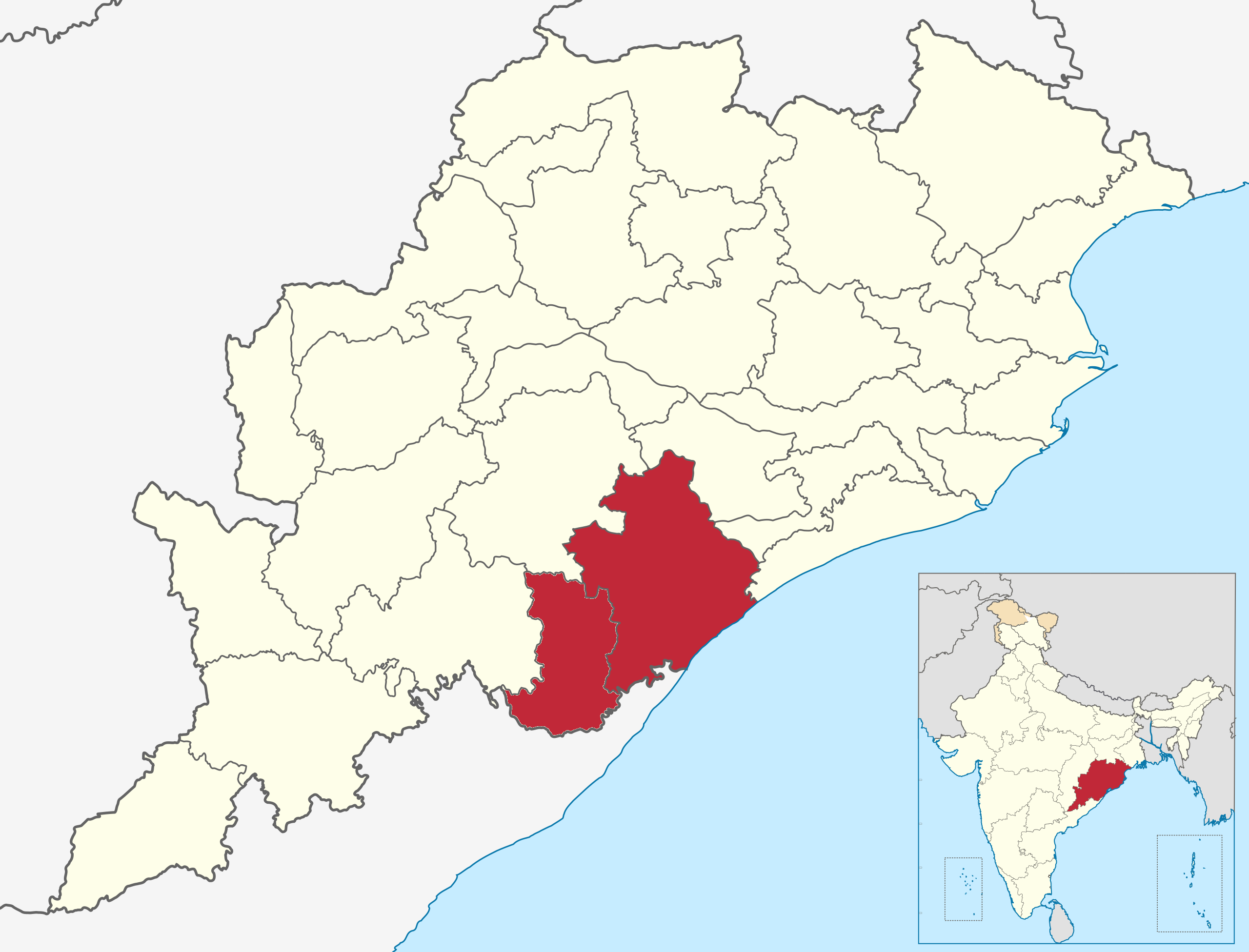

The Roman Catholic Diocese of Berhampur (Latin: Berhampuren(sis)) is a diocese located in the city of Berhampur in the ecclesiastical province of Cuttack-Bhubaneswar in India.

== History ==
- 24 January 1974: Established as Diocese of Berhampur from the Diocese of Cuttack

== Leadership ==
- Bishops of Berhampur (Latin Rite)
  - Bishop Sarat Chandra Nayak (27 November 2006 – present)
  - Bishop Joseph Das (3 May 1993 – 27 November 2006)
  - Bishop Thomas Thiruthalil, C.M. (24 January 1974 – 18 December 1989)

== Causes for canonisation ==
- Servant of God Fr. Valerian Guemes, C.M
