= Archdiocese of Cuttack-Bhubaneswar =

Roman Catholic archdiocese in Orissa, India

Coordinates: 20.4802°N 85.8643°E

Archdiocese of Cuttack-Bhubaneswar Archidioecesis Cuttackensis-Bhubanesvarensis

Location
- Country: India
- Territory: Kandhamal (entire district); Bhubuneswar; Cuttack; Jajpur
- Ecclesiastical province: Cuttack-Bhubaneswar

Statistics
- Area: 32,440 km^{2} (12,530 sq mi)
- Population: Total; Catholics: (as of 2021); 13,540,000; 75,275 (0.6%)
- Parishes: 38

Information
- Rite: Latin Rite
- Cathedral: Cathedral of the Most Holy Rosary, Cuttack
- Co-cathedral: St. Vincents De Paul pro Cathedral, Bhubuneswar
- Patron saint: Saint Joseph

Current leadership
- Pope: Leo XIV
- Metropolitan Archbishop: John Barwa, S.V.D.
- Auxiliary Bishops: Fr. Rabindra Kumar Ranasingh(Bishop elect)
- Bishops emeritus: Raphael Cheenath Archbishop Emeritus (1985-2011)

Map
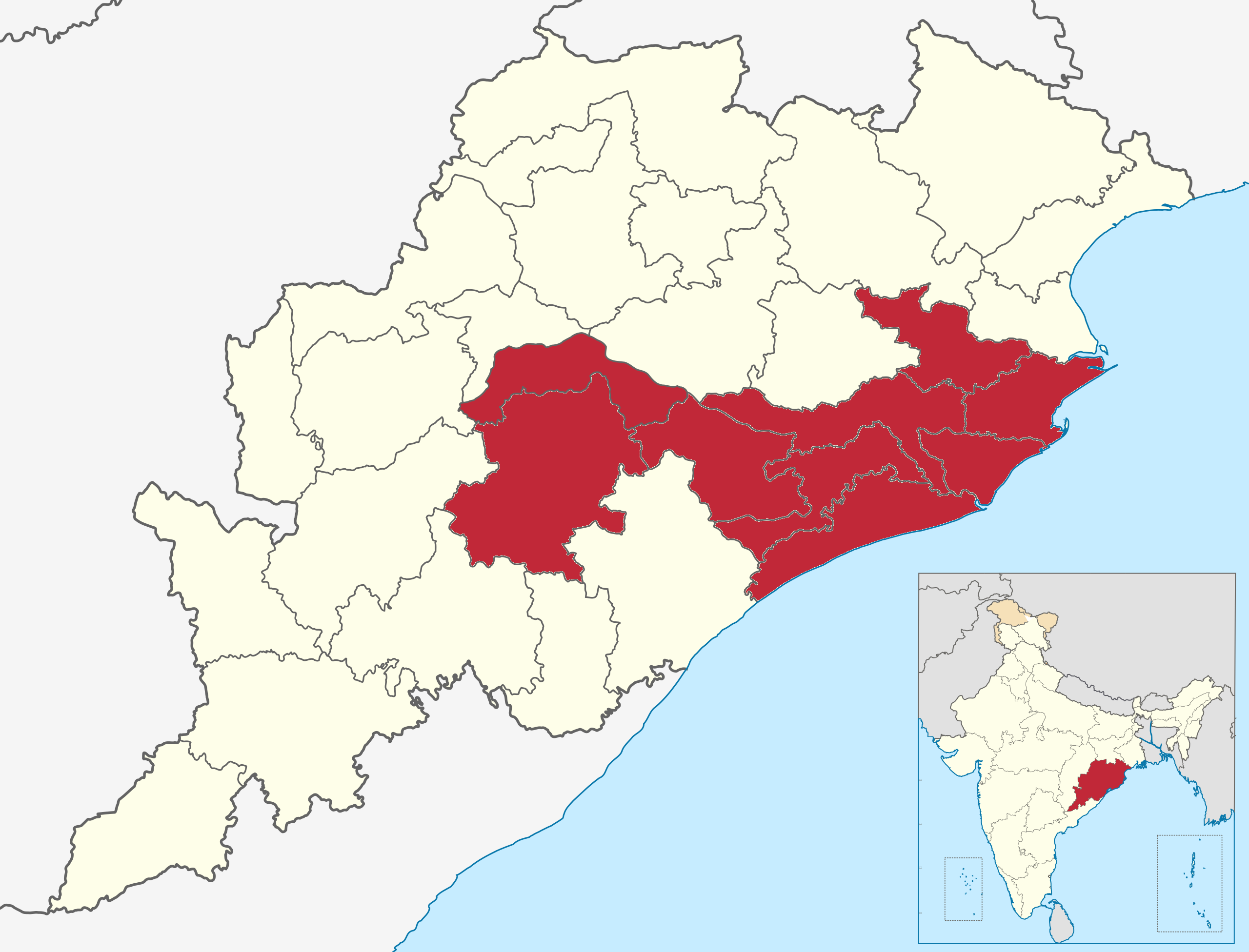

Website
- Website of the Archdiocese

The Roman Catholic Archdiocese of Cuttack-Bhubaneswar (Latin: Cuttacken(sis)-Bhubanesvaren(sis)) is an archdiocese located in the cities of Cuttack, Bhubaneswar and covering the entire Kandhamal district in India.

== History ==
- 18 July 1928: Established as Mission “sui iuris” of Cuttack from the Diocese of Vizagapatam
- 1 June 1937: Promoted as Diocese of Cuttack
- 24 January 1974: Promoted as Metropolitan Archdiocese of Cuttack–Bhubaneswar

== Leadership ==
- Archbishops of Metropolitan See of Cuttack-Bhubaneswar (Latin Rite)
  - Archbishop John Barwa SVD
  - Archbishop Raphael Cheenath, S.V.D. (1 July 1985 – 14 August 2016)
  - Archbishop Henry Sebastian D'Souza (24 January 1974 – 29 March 1985)
- Bishops of Cuttack (Latin Rite)
  - Bishop Pablo Tobar Gonzáles, C.M. (10 March 1949 – 18 April 1971)
  - Bishop Florencio Sanz Esparza, C.M. (11 November 1932 – 4 March 1948)
- Ecclesiastical Superiors of Cuttack (Latin Rite)
  - Fr. Valeriano Guemes Rodriguez, C.M. (2 July 1929 – 1932)

== Suffragan dioceses ==
- Balasore
- Berhampur
- Rayagada
- Rourkela
- Sambalpur

== Saints and causes for canonisation ==
- Blessed Odoric of Pordenone, a Franciscan friar who visited Puri and wrote about the Rath Yatra.
- Servant of God Marian Zelazek, SVD
- Bernard Digal and 6 Lay Companions

== Sources ==
- GCatholic.org
- Catholic Hierarchy
