= Roman Catholic Diocese of Sambalpur =

Roman Catholic diocese in Orissa, India

Coordinates: 21.4738°N 83.9869°E

Diocese of Sambalpur Dioecesis Sambalpurensis

Location
- Country: India
- Ecclesiastical province: Cuttack–Bhubaneswar

Statistics
- Area: 37,299 km^{2} (14,401 sq mi)
- Population: Total; Catholics: (as of 2010); 7,548,100; 40,256 (0.5%)

Information
- Sui iuris church: Latin Church
- Rite: Roman Rite
- Cathedral: Cathedral of St Joseph the Worker in Sambalpur

Current leadership
- Pope: Francis
- Bishop: Niranjan Sual Singh
- Bishops emeritus: Lucas Kerketta Bishop Emeritus (1987-2013)

Map
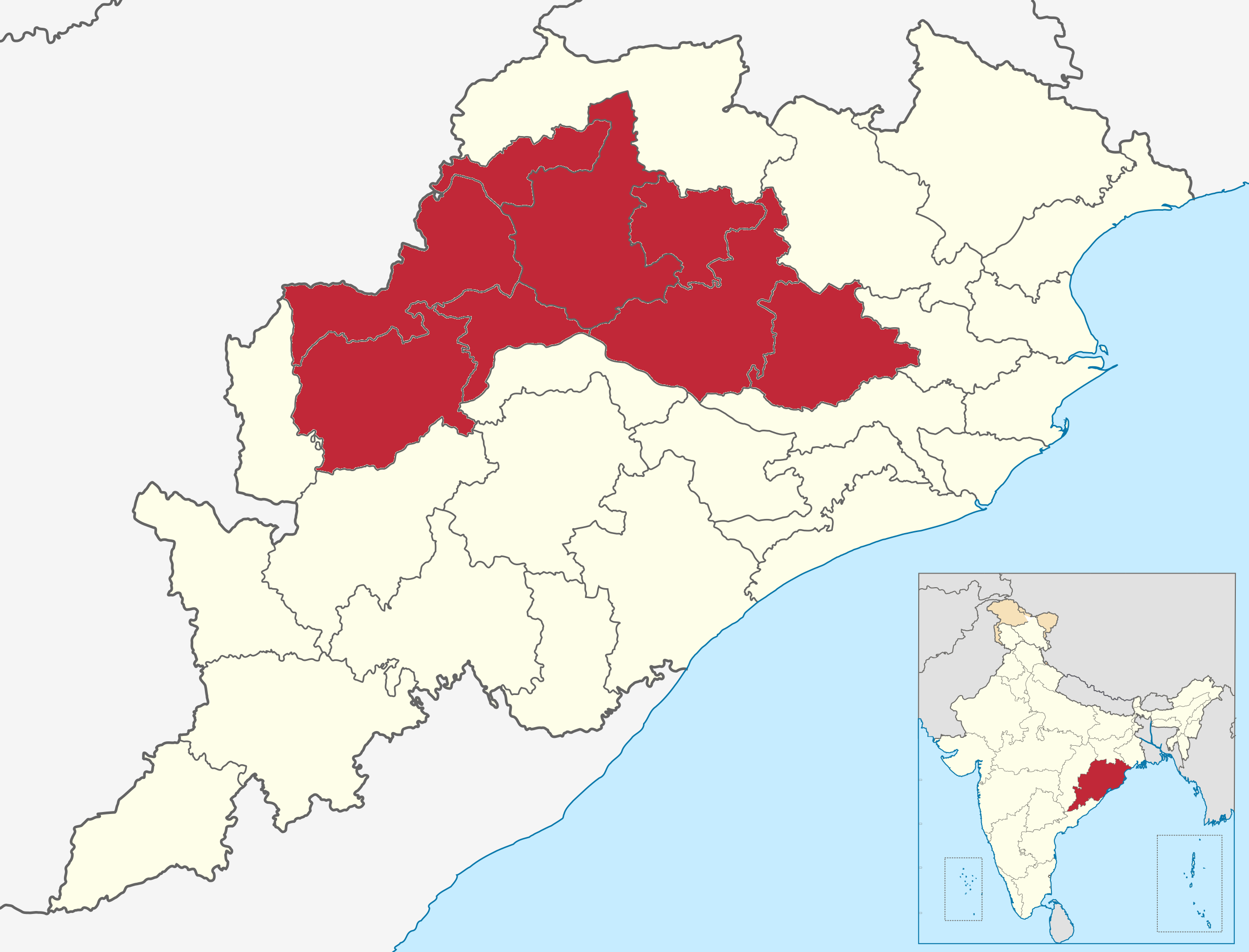

The Roman Catholic Diocese of Sambalpur (Latin: Sambalpuren(sis)) is a diocese located in the city of Sambalpur in the ecclesiastical province of Cuttack-Bhubaneswar in India.

== History ==
- 14 June 1951: Established as Diocese of Sambalpur from the Roman Catholic Archdiocese of Calcutta, Diocese of Nagpur and Diocese of Ranchi

== Leadership ==
- Bishops of Sambalpur (Latin Church)
  - Hermann Westermann (14 June 1951 – 28 February 1974)
  - Raphael Cheenath (later Archbishop) (28 February 1974 – 1 July 1985)
  - Lucas Kerketta (17 November 1986 – 26 July 2013)
  - Niranjan Sual Singh (28 September 2013 – present)
