= Sebastian Vaniyapurackal =

Syro-Malabar Archbishop

Mar Sebastian Vaniyapurackal ܣܒܣܛܝܢ ܘܢܝܐܦܘܪܟܠ
- Metropolitan Archbishop of Kalyan
- Church: Syro-Malabar Church
- Archdiocese: Archeparchy of Kalyan
- Appointed: 28 August 2025
- Installed: 19 October 2025
- Predecessor: Thomas Elavanal
- Previous post: Curia bishop of the Syro-Malabar Church

Orders
- Ordination: December 30, 1992 by Mathew Vattackuzhy
- Consecration: November 12, 2017 by George Alencherry, Andrews Thazhath and Mathew Arackal
- Rank: Metropolitan Archbishop

Personal details
- Born: March 29, 1967 (age 59) Kokkayar, Kerala, India
- Denomination: Syro Malabar Catholic
- Motto: To serve and not to be served
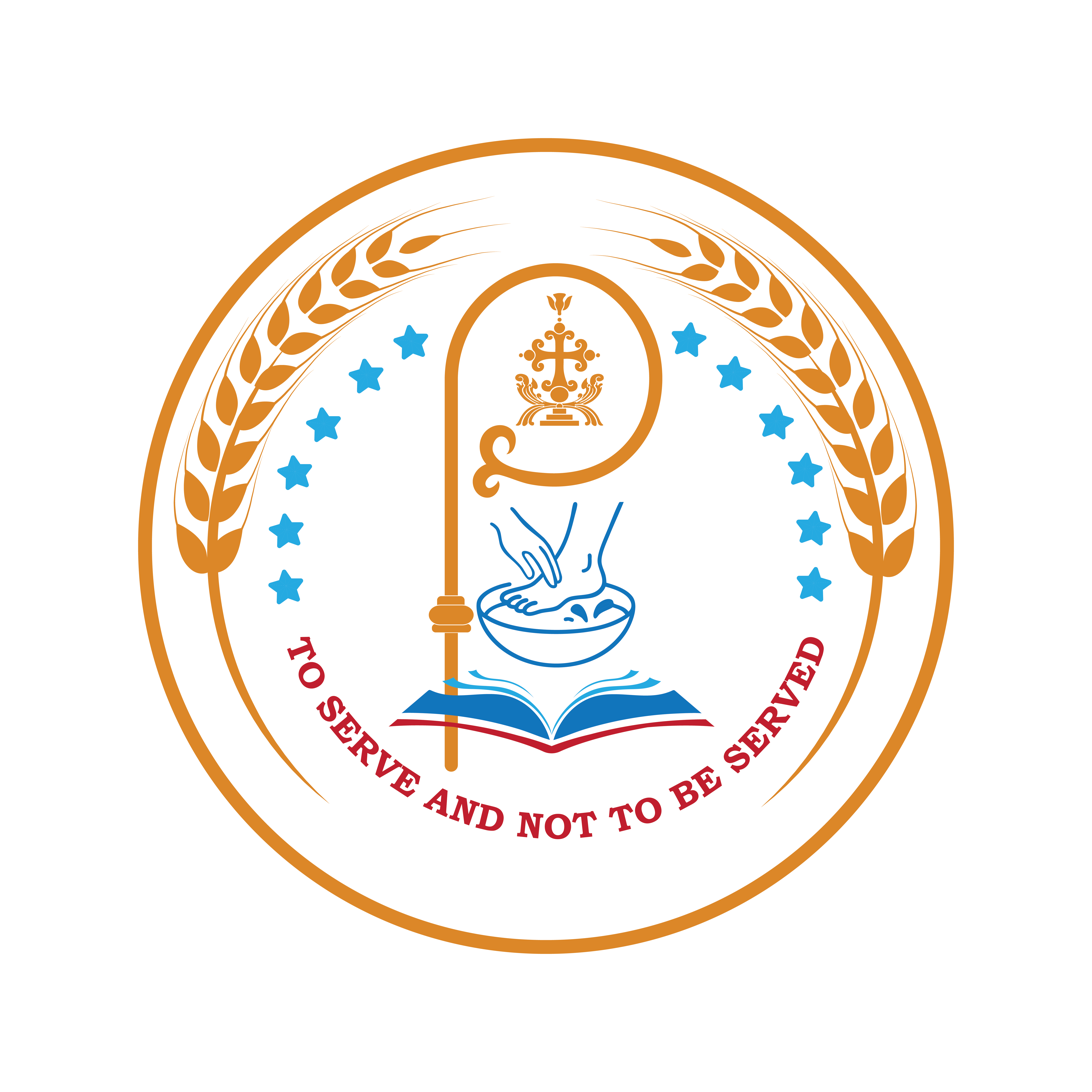
- Coat of arms

Mar Sebastian Vaniyapurackal (born March 29, 1967) is an Indian-born Archbishop of the Archeparchy of Kalyan.

After the resignation of Cardinal Mar George Alencherry in 2023, as per the rules of canon law, Mar Sebastian served as the Archiepiscopal Administrator (temporarily) for the Syro Malabar Church until the election of the Raphael Thattil as the new major archbishop by the Syro-Malabar Holy Synod.

He was elected the Metropolitan Archbishop of newly erected Ecclesiastical province of Archeparchy of Kalyan in the year 2025.

== Biography ==
=== Early life and priesthood ===
Vaniyapurackal was born on March 29, 1967, in Kokkayar, Kerala, as the eighth child of V.M. Thomas and Aleyamma. He attended St. Louis L.P. School in Mundakayam and St. Joseph High School in Peruvanthanam before when in 1982 he began his priestly formation at Mary Matha Minor Seminary in Podimattom. He then attended St. Thomas Apostolic Seminary, Vadavathoor, for his philosophical and theological studies. He was ordained by Eparchy of Kanjirappally Eparch Mar Mathew Vattachuzhy on December 30, 1992. He then served as an assistant priest at St. George's Forane Church (Kattappana) before being appointed by Mar Vattachuzhy as the director of Yuvadeepti for the eparchy. After his service as its director, He went to the Pontifical University of the Holy Cross for a doctorate in canon law. After returning, He was appointed Kanjirappally's judicial vicar and then continued in various parish ministry assignments in Koratty, Poomattam, Chennakkunnu and Mulamkunnu. Along with his service in Kanjirappally, Cardinal Mar Varkey Vithayathil appointed him as the Defender of the Bond at the Syro-Malabar Major Archiepiscopal Tribunal. After his pastoral ministry, He was a professor at Benedictine Ashram, Kappad, Good Shepherd Major Seminary, Kunnoth and Nirmala Theological College, Podimattam. In 2014, He was appointed by Cardinal Mar George Alencherry as the vice chancellor of the Major Archiepiscopal Curia of the Syro Malabar Church.

=== Curia bishop ===
On September 1, 2017, Pope Francis announced his assent to the election of Fr. Sebastian Vaniyapurackal as the curia bishop of the Syro Malabar Church, after his election by the Syro Malabar Synod. He was installed on November 12, 2017, by Cardinal Mar George Alencherry, Major Archbishop in the Presence of Trichur Archbishop Andrews Thazhath and Kankirappally Eparch Mathew Arackal. The position had been vacant since the appointment of the first curia bishop Bosco Puthur as the eparch of Melbourne.

=== Archiepiscopal administrator ===
On December 7, 2023, The Syro Malabar Church announced that Mar Sebastian Vaniyapurackal would serve as the archiepiscopal administrator of the entire Syro Malabar Church upon Pope Francis accepting the resignation of the major archbishop of the Syro Malabar Church Cardinal Mar George Alencherry due to Eastern Canon Law stating that the curia bishop takes over if the seat of the major archbishop falls vacant. He will serve in this position until the Synod of Bishops elect a new major archbishop in January 2024. He served along his predecessor Bosco Puthur as Mar Puthur serves as the apostolic administrator of Syro-Malabar Catholic Major Archeparchy of Ernakulam–Angamaly. Mar Vaniyapurackal announced the January Synod of Bishops to elect the next major archbishop, which resulted in the election of Raphael Thattil on January 9, 2024. Mar Vaniyapurackal installed Mar Thattil as the major archbishop in a simple ceremony on January 11, 2024, at Mount Saint Thomas and with that reliquinshed his role as Administrator of the Church.

=== Metropolitan Archbishop of Kalyan ===
After the resignation of Mar Thomas Elavanal MCBS from the office of the Eparch of the Syro-Malabar Eparchy of Kalyan, the second session of the xxxiii synod of bishops of the Syro-Malabar Church elected Mar Sebastian Vaniyapurackal as the Eparch of Kalyan on 28th of August 2025. At the same time, the Major Archbishop with the consent of Holy Father Pope Leo XIV and the decision of the synod of bishops declared the Ecclesiastical Province of Kalyan and raised the Eparchy to the status of Archeparchy. Thus, Mar Sebastian Vaniyapurackal become the first Metropolitan Archbishop of the newly created Archeparchy of Kalyan. On 19th October 2025, the Enthronement service was held at the Cathedral of the Archeparchy of Kalyan. His Beatitude Mar Raphael Thattil installed His Grace Mar Sebastian Vaniyapurackal as its first Metropolitan Archbishop.
