= Missionary Congregation of the Blessed Sacrament =

The Missionary Congregation of the Blessed Sacrament (MCBS) is an indigenous clerical congregation of the Syro-Malabar Catholic Church in southern India.

== The birth of MCBS ==
In the beginning of the twentieth century, there was a Eucharistic-centered re-awakening in the life of the Catholic Church, initiated by Pope Pius X (1903–1914). This movement, with a new missionary awareness and enthusiasm, had an impact on the Syro-Malabar Church in India. It was in this historical setting that the Missionary Congregation of the Blessed Sacrament (MCBS) was born.

Father Joseph Paredom, was born on 15 December 1887 at Mutholapuram, Kerala, India. He became a priest on 28thDecember 1914. Father Mathew Alakulam was born on 30 March 1888 at Poovathode, India; he was ordained on 21 December 1913. The two priests founded the Missionary Congregation of the Blessed Sacrament (MCBS) on 7 May 1933. Mar James Kalacherry, bishop of Syro-Malabar Catholic Archeparchy of Changanacherry, officially established the Missionary Congregation of the Blessed Sacrament on that date.

The congregation was originally based at Mallappally but was soon moved to Kaduvakulam, and the Little Flower Ashram there is considered to be the Mother House of the congregation.

Today MCBS, a religious congregation of the pontifical right, is known as the Benedictines of the Syro-Malabar Church due to her unique liturgical, Eucharistic, and missionary charism and contributions.

== Founders of MCBS ==
=== Very Rev Fr Mathew Alakalam MCBS ===
==== Priestly ministry ====
After becoming a priest in 1913, Fr Mathew served as assistant parish priest at Kurusumkal, Koonammavu, Mundankal, Cheruvandoor, Elamthottam, and Pravithanam and as parish priest at Poovathode, Edamaraku, and Elamthottam. Since 1919 he was professor of Syriac at Puthenpally Seminary. When Mar James Kalassery became Bishop of Changanassery, Fr Mathew was his first secretary. He was superior of the Franciscan Third Order, and established the Orphanage Press and Priests' Provident Fund in the diocese of Changanassery.

==== Literary contributions ====
Fr Mathew was sub-editor of the magazine Eucharist and Priest published from Puthenpally Seminary and was the founding editor of Vedaprachara Madhyasthan, the official tongue of Changanassery Archdiocese. He wrote many articles and authored 24 theological books.

==== Death ====
Fr Mathew died on 21 December 1977 and his mortal remains were buried in the church at the MCBS mother house, Kaduvakkulam.

=== Rev Fr Joseph Paredom MCBS ===
==== Shepherd ====
After his ordination in 1914, Father Joseph served at several parishes including Mutholapuram, Bharananganam, Muttuchira, Thathampally, Kainady, Vadakara, Chemmalamattam, and Marangattupally.

==== Superior general ====
Father Joseph was the first Superior General of the Missionary Congregation of the Blessed Sacrament and led the congregation during its initial 22 years.

==== Death ====
Father Joseph died on 21 August 1972. His mortal remains were kept at the MCBS Mother House, Kaduvakulam, Kottayam.

=== Exhumation and reburial ===
The mortal remains of our venerable founders, Fr. Mathew Alakulam and Fr. Joseph Paredam were exhumed from the tombs at Kaduvakulam and reburied temporarily in the tombs prepared in the Lisieux Minor Seminary chapel at Athirampuzha, on 12 May 2009 in the presence of Mar Joseph Perumthottam, the Arch Bishop of Changanacherry.

== Growth and development of MCBS ==
In 1978, the district of Shimoga in Karnataka, under the jurisdiction of Mananthavady diocese, was entrusted to MCBS for pastoral care and evangelization.

In 1989 the missionary activities of the congregation were extended to Rajasthan. The district of Sirohi is entrusted to the congregation for evangelization.

On 25 May 1989, the 'Rule of Life' of the congregation, revised and renewed after a careful study of the charism, nature, spirit, tradition and founders, and according to the directives given by the Congregation for the Oriental Churches, was promulgated. The Holy See approved the Rule of Life for an experimental period of seven years and raised the congregation to pontifical Status on 2 December 1989.

In 1992 the districts of Satara and Solapur in Maharashtra, under the jurisdiction of the diocese of Kalyan, were entrusted to the congregation for pastoral care and evangelization.

On 4 May 1995 the congregation was divided into two regions, the MCBS Emmaus Region and the MCBS Zion Region.

On 3 July 1996, Jeevalaya (MCBS' Major Seminary) was inaugurated.

Shencottai Mission in South Tamil Nadu under the jurisdiction of the diocese of Tukala was started in the year 1996 for the pastoral care of the poor and afflicted.

On 2 December 1996 the two regions were raised to the status of provinces, namely, MCBS Emmaus Province and MCBS Zion Province.

On 18 December 1996 Thomas Elavanal, then Superior General, was nominated the first bishop from the Congregation. Mar Thomas Elavanal was consecrated Bishop of Kalyan on 8 February 1997.

On 21 May 1997 the first Provincial synaxis of both provinces was held to elect the Provincial Superiors and their teams.

On 28 October 1998 the Holy See gave definite approbation to the Constitution and Directory of the MCBS.

On 7 June 2004, 'SANATHANA' MCBS Theologate, Thamarassery was inaugurated.

On 7 May 2007, the Platinum Jubilee of the Congregation was inaugurated at Mother House, Kolladu, Kottayam.

On 28 July 2007, Adilabad Mission, the first missionary field in Andhra Pradesh was started in the feast of Blessed Alphonsa.

On 29 August, Fr. Joseph Arumachadath, the then Vice-Rector of Sanathana MCBS Theologate, Thamarassery was nominated as the first bishop of the Bhadravati Diocese, Karnataka.

On 8 September 2007 – Missionaries were sent out to Switzerland.

On 25 October 2007 – Consecration of Mar Joseph Arumachadath and the inauguration of the Bhadravati Diocese, Karnataka

On 7 May 2008 – Platinum Jubilee celebrations of the Congregation came to its end at MCBS Generalate, Aluva. On 18 Dec 2009 MCBS missionaries started mission in Tanzania, Africa. At present there are around 20 priests working in Tanzania from the two provinces called Emmaus and Zion.

== Nature of MCBS ==
=== Ideals ===
The MCBS's ideal is to consecrate the entire life to the realisation of God's Kingdom (Matt 6, 10), placing the Eucharist at the core of its being.

The MCBS draws inspiration from the age-old spiritual wisdom of eastern Christian monasticism and from the quest of the sages (rishis) of India for the absolute. As such, it works to reach out, in and through the Eucharist, to the God-experience of our father St. Thomas, the Apostle, in his faith-surrender "My Lord and My God" (John20,28). They focus on living a religious life marked by love and single minded devotion (bhakti) to the Eucharistic Lord and missionary vitality. In 2023, the congregation has two provinces, MCBS Zion and MCBS Emmaus.

=== Works ===
The core areas of MCBS activity include; Liturgical Apostolate, Eucharistic Retreat, Parish Apostolate, Proclamation of Good News, Mission towards unity, Social Apostolate, Inculturation, and Dialogue with other religions.

The MCBS mission works are mainly among the poor, illiterate, and the marginalized. The congregation works in several Indian states: (including Andrapradesh, Arunachalpradesh, Assam, Delhi, Gujarat, Karnataka, Kerala, Maharashtra, Meghalaya, Rajasthan and Tamil Nadu) and throughout the world (including Africa, America, Australia, Germany, Italy, Spain and Switzerland).

=== Theological Seminaries ===
In 1996, MCBS opened the Jeevalaya Seminary. The foundation stone for the seminary was laid on 27 April 1992 and Jeevalaya was inaugurated on 3 July 1996.

In 2001, MCBS opened the Theological Seminary, Sanathana – Divya Karunya Vidyapeetham (DKV) at Thamarassery. On 24 May 2001 Mar Thomas Elavanal, Bishop of Kalyan, laid the foundation stone for the seminary. On 7 June 2004, Mar Paul Chittilapilly, Bishop of Thamarassery, inaugurated the DKV's first academic year 2004–2005. The institute is affiliated with the faculty of Theology of the Pontifical Urbaniana University, Rome.

== Bishops from MCBS ==
=== Superior General ===
In 2023, the Superior General is Father Augustine Paikattu.

=== Mar Thomas Elavanal MCBS, Bishop of Kalyan ===
On 18 December 1996 Thomas Elavanal, then Superior General, was nominated as bishop. He was consecrated Bishop of Kalyan on 8 February 1997.

=== Mar Joseph Arumachadath MCBS, Bishop of Bhadravathi ===
On 29 August 2007, Fr. Joseph Arumachadath, the then Vice-Rector of Sanathana MCBS Theologate, Thamarassery, was nominated as bishop of the Bhadravati Diocese, Karnataka. He was consecrated on 25 October 2007.
