= Thomas Elavanal =

Indian Catholic bishop (born 1950)

Mar Thomas Elavanal MCBS
- Bishop Emeritus of Kalyan
- Native name: ܡܵܪܝ ܬܐܘܿܡܐܵ ܐܲܦܸܣܩܘܿܦܵܐ
- Archdiocese: Archeparchy of Kalyan
- Term ended: 28 August 2025
- Predecessor: Mar Paul Chittilapilly
- Successor: Mar Sebastian Vaniyapurackal

Orders
- Ordination: 22 December 1975
- Consecration: 8 February 1997
- Rank: Bishop

Personal details
- Born: 28 March 1950 (age 76) Palai, Kerala, India
- Denomination: Syro-Malabar Catholic Church
- Motto: To love in Jesus, to lead to Jesus

Mar Thomas Elavanal (born 28 March 1950) was a Syro Malabar Catholic Bishop. He was the Bishop of the former Diocese of Kalyan.

== Biography ==
Bishop Mar Thomas Elavanal was born to Zacharias and Thresia on 28 March 1950 at Mutholy, near Palai, in Kerala. He was born into a branch of the ancient Palackal family of Pallipuram.

The family soon migrated to Chathankottunada, near Kuttiady in Calicut district, where he completed his high school education. He then joined the MCBS Minor Seminary in June 1966. He had his first religious profession on 17 May 1968 and priestly ordination by Mar Sebastian Mankuzhikary on 22 December 1975.

After a brief period of 3 years appointment at the MCBS Minor Seminary, Kottayam, he travelled to Rome and the US for his Higher Studies. He holds a licentiate in liturgy from Pontifical Oriental Institute and a doctorate in theology from the Pontifical University of St. Thomas Aquinas, Angelicum in Rome. His dissertation was entitled A study of the anaphora of the Apostles Mar Addai and Mari. His post-doctoral studies were at the Catholic University of America, Washington.

On his return to India, he was appointed rector of the MCBS Seminary, Alwaye and in 1989, the assistant superior general of the congregation. He was the visiting professor of liturgy at the Pontifical Institute of Theology and Philosophy, Alwaye and Paurastya Vidyapitham, Kottayam. In 1995 he was elected the superior general.

He was nominated as bishop of Kalyan on 18 December 1996. On 8 February 1997, he was consecrated bishop, the shepherd of over one hundred thousand migrants of the Syro-Malabar Catholics spread across the cities of Bombay, Pune and Nashik. In 2022, he celebrated 25 years in this post.

As of 2023 he was the Chairman of the Western Regional Commission for Health and the Syro-Malabar Synodal Commission for Liturgy.

== See also ==
Missionary Congregation of the Blessed Sacrament
