= Ayyappancoil =

Village in Kerala, India

- Village
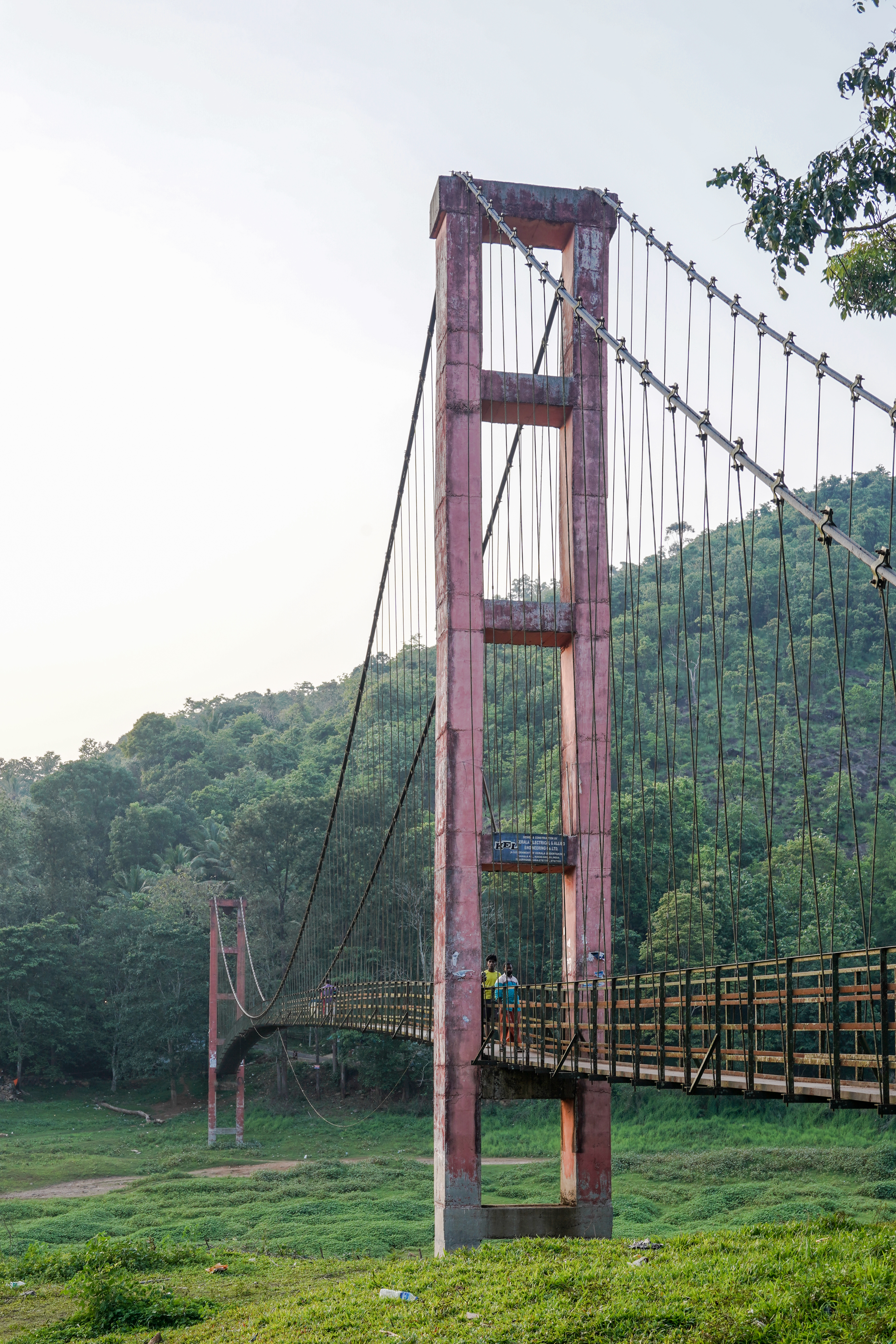
- Suspension bridge at Ayyappancoil
- Interactive map of Ayyappancoil
- Location in Kerala, India Ayyappancoil (India)
- Coordinates: 9°42′57″N 77°02′00″E
- Country: India
- State: Kerala
- District: Idukki
- Named for: Ayyappancoil suspension bridge and old Sastha temple

Government
  - Type: Panchayath
  - Body: Ayyappancoil Grama Panchayat

Area
  - Total: 85.73 km^{2} (33.10 sq mi)

Population (2011)
  - Total: 34,267
  - Density: 399.7/km^{2} (1,035/sq mi)

Languages
  - Official: Malayalam, English
- Time zone: UTC+5:30 (IST)
- Vehicle registration: KL-37
- Literacy: 92%

Ayyappancoil, also spelt Ayyappankovil is a village in newly formed Idukki taluk in Idukki district in the Indian state of Kerala. The place is popular for having a suspension bridge with a length of 200 meters and an old historic Sastha temple on the banks of Periyar River.

Ayyappancoil is 15 km (9.3 mi) away from the nearby town of Kattappana. Ayyappancoil is located 45 km (28 mi) from District headquarters Painavu and 230 km (140 mi) from its State capital city Thiruvananthapuram . Ayyappancoil was a big township in early 1960s. During the construction of Idukki hydro-electric project, the township was evacuated by the Kerala government.

== Demographics ==
As of 2011 Census, Ayyappancoil village had a population of 34,267, with 16,943 males and 17,324 females. Ayyappancoil village spreads over an area of 85.73 km^{2} (33.10 sq mi) with 8,736 families residing in it. 9.3% of the population was under 6 years of age. It had an average literacy of 93.5% higher than the national average of 74% and lower than state average of 94%: male literacy was 95.4% and female literacy was 91.7%.

== Economy ==
Ayyappancoil is predominantly an agrarian based economy. Cash crops like cardamom, pepper and tea are widely cultivated here.

== Administration ==
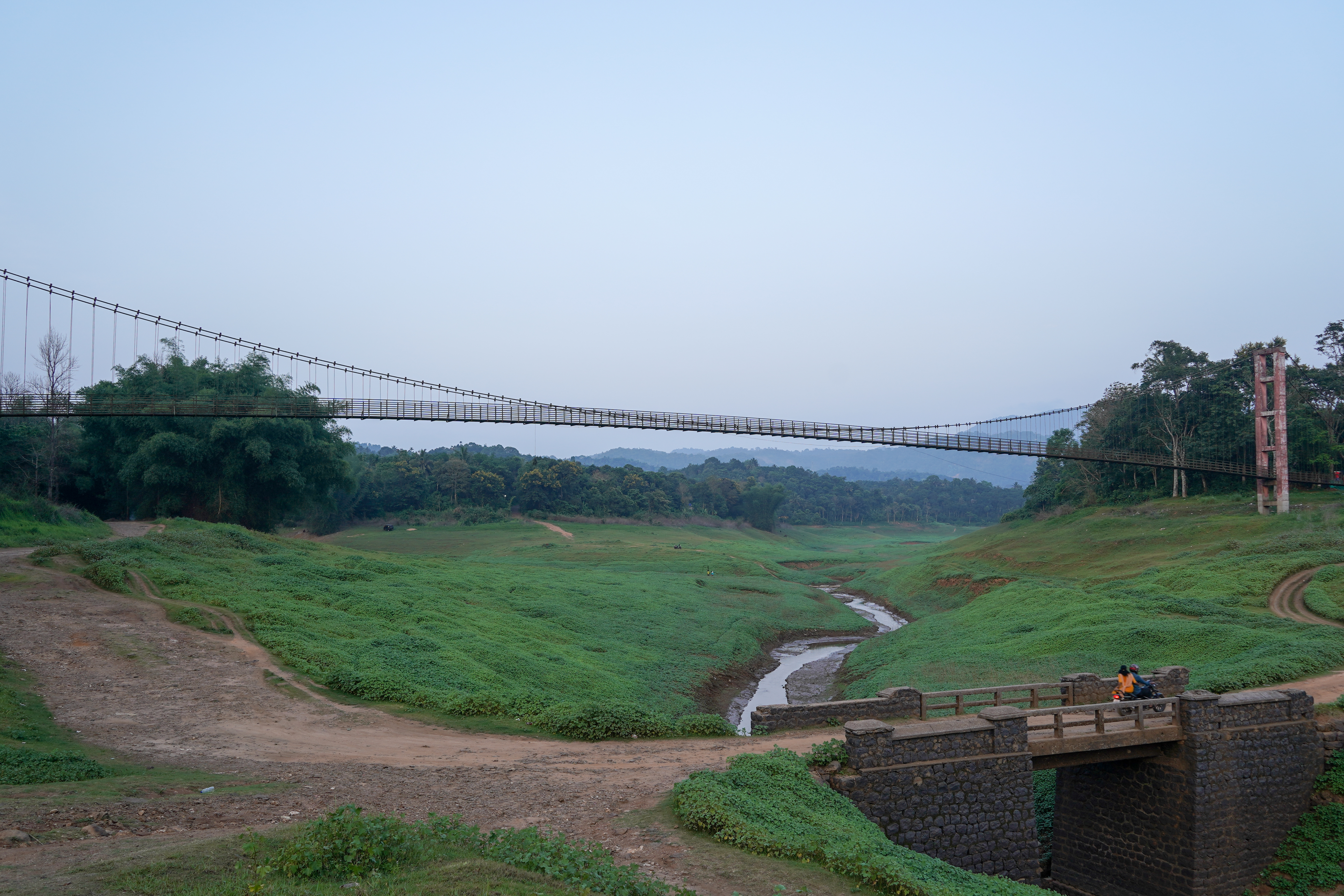
Road bridge usable only for 6 months in the year (ca. May '22)

Ayyappancoil panchayath was formed in 1977 and it spreads over an area of about 42.68 km^{2}. It is divided into 13 wards for administrative convenience. It is surrounded by Kanchiyar panchayath in north, Kumily in east, Upputhara in west and Elappara in south.

=== Wards in Ayyappancoil panchayath ===
- Ayyappancoil
- Aanakuzhi
- Mattukatta
- Chembalam
- Dorland
- Palanikkavu
- Sulthaniya
- Pachakadu
- Heavenvalley
- K. Chappathu
- Aalady
- Poovanthikudi
- Marykulam

== Places of interest ==
=== Ayyappancoil suspension (hanging) bridge ===
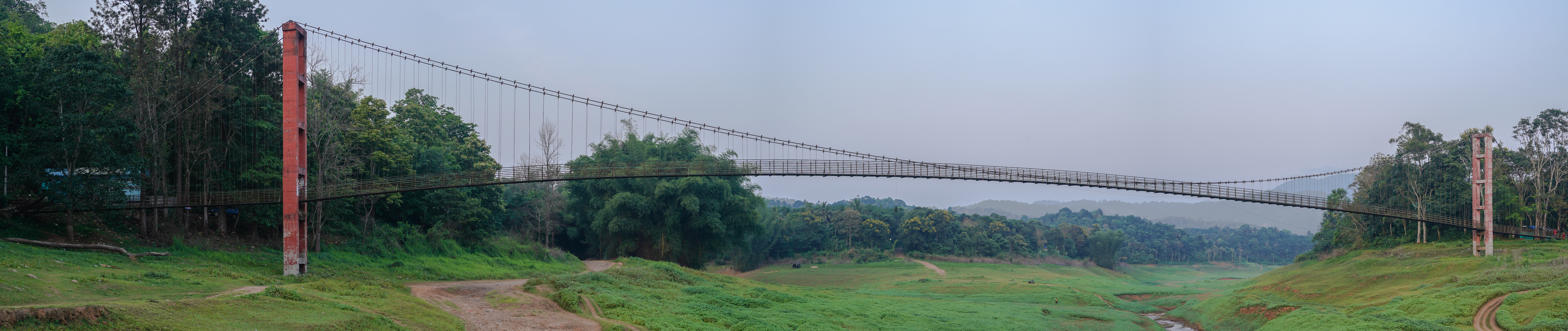
Ayyappancoil suspension bridge (ca. May '22)

Ayyappancoil hanging (Suspension) bridge is built across the Periyar River, connecting the Ayyappancoil Grama panchayath and Kanchiyar Grama Panchayath in Idukki district, Kerala. The older road bridge over the Periyar River is submerged by the waters of the Idukki Reservoir for about 6 months in the year. The suspension bridge gives year round pedestrian access. This bridge is the longest hanging suspension bridge in the district. The suspension bridge draws a lot of tourists owing to its picturesque scenery.

=== Ayyappancoil Sastha Temple ===
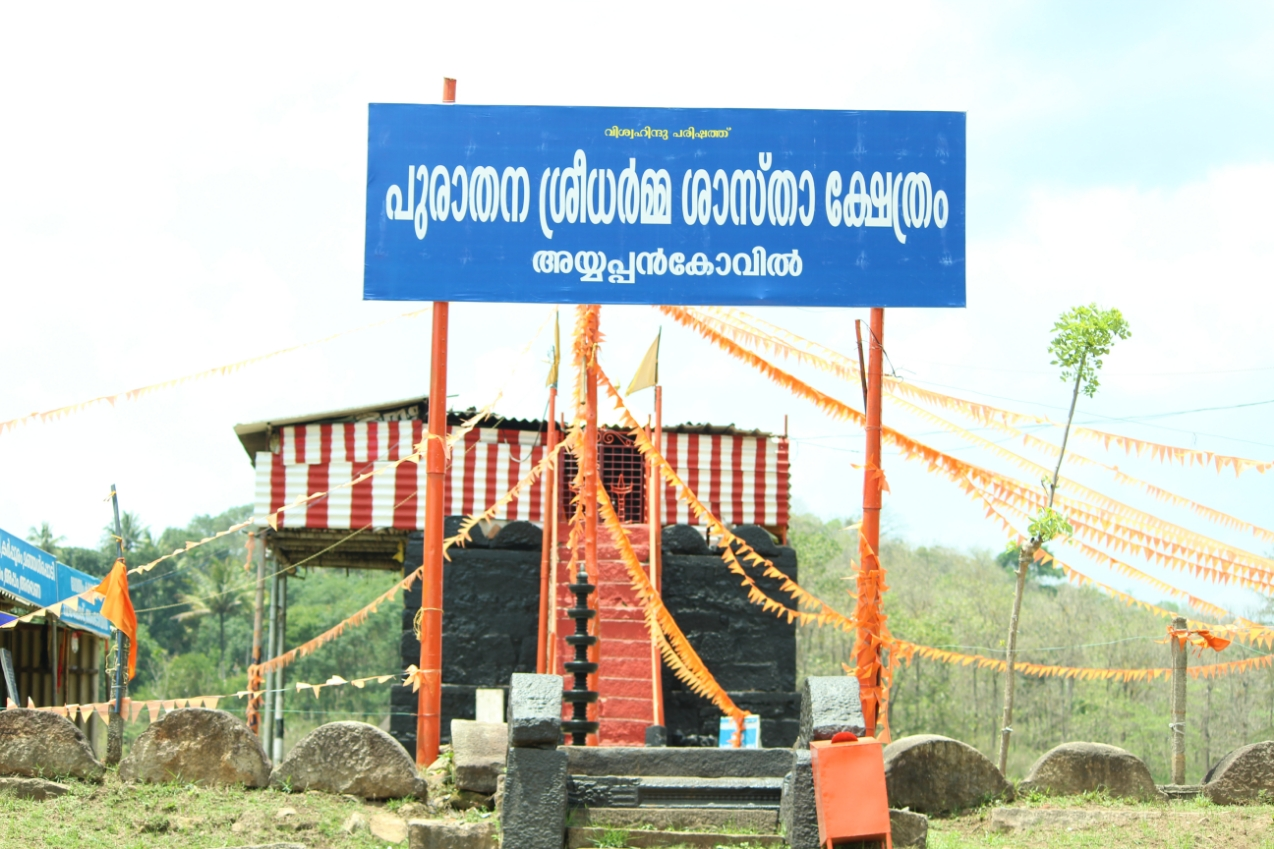
Front view of Ayyappancoil Sastha temple

The old temple dedicated to Sastha which is on the banks of Periyar river is a main landmark of Ayyappancoil. The idol here is believed to consecrated by sage Parashurama himself. The temple is submerged when the water level in Idukki reservoir rises during the Southwest monsoon from June onwards. The temple was later shifted to Thoppipala, which is on the Kattappana - Kuttikkanam state highway. However, local people prefer to worship at the original temple. The sreekovil has been raised so that it is above the water when the temple is submerged. Pilgrims reach the temple across the Idukki reservoir via small canoes. A bamboo bridge is made by tribals from the shore to the temple for access during major festivals.
