= Eparchy of Kanjirappally =

Eastern Catholic eparchy in Kerala, India

Eparchy of Kanjirapally
- Coat of arms

Location
- Country: India
- Ecclesiastical province: Metropolitan Province of Changanassery

Statistics
- Area: 1,980 km^{2} (760 sq mi)
- Population: Total; Catholics: (as of 2011); 1,383,000; 228,700 (16.5%)

Information
- Denomination: Syro-Malabar Catholic Church
- Rite: East Syriac Rite
- Established: 26 February 1977
- Cathedral: Cathedral of St Dominic in Kanjirappally
- Patron saint: Mary, mother of Jesus

Current leadership
- Pope: Leo XIV
- Major Archbishop: Raphael Thattil
- Bishop: Jose Pulickal ܡܵܪܝ ܝܵܘܣܹܦ ܐܲܦܸܣܩܘܿܦܵܐ
- Metropolitan Archbishop: Mar Thomas Tharayil
- Bishops emeritus: Mathew Vattackuzhy (1987–2000); Mathew Arackal (2001-2020)

Website
- Website of the Diocese

The Eparchy of Kanjirappally is a Syro-Malabar Catholic eparchy with an area of 1980 km^{2} comprising the Kanjirappally taluk in Kottayam district and a few villages of the neighbouring taluks in Kottayam district, northern Pathanamthitta district, and parts of Idukki district of central Kerala in South India.

The Eparchy of Kanjirappally-Nilackal was erected by Pope Paul VI with the bull "Nos Beati Petri Successores" in February 1977, which separated the eastern part of the Archeparchy of Changanassery and erected the new eparchy of Kanjirapally-Nilackal, as a suffragan of the same Archeparchy. Jose Pulickal is the current bishop, serving since January 2020. Mathew Arackal is the bishop emeritus of the eparchy, who served from 2001 to 2020. Mary Matha Minor seminary is the heart of kanjirapally diocese.

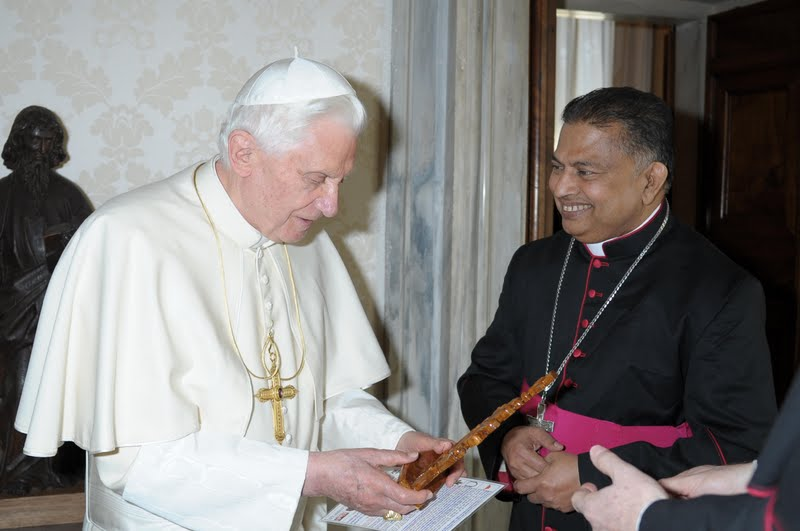
Mathew Arackal, Bishop of Kanjirapally, with Pope Benedict XVI.

== Prelates ==
Eparchs of Kanjirappally

Sl.no	Name	Designation	Year of appointment	Last year of service
1	Joseph Powathil	Bishop	1977	1985
2	Mathew Vattackuzhy	Bishop	1986	2000
3	Mathew Arackal	Bishop	2000	2020
4	Jose Pulickal	Bishop	2020	present

Prelates Hailing From Diocese

Sl.no	Name	Designation	Year of appointment	Last year of service
1	Thomas Kozhimala	Former Bishop - Bhagalpur	1996	2005
2	Mathai Kochuparampil SDB	Former Bishop - Dimphu	1983	1992
3	Sebastian Vaniyapurackal	Archbishop - Kalyan	2025	Present
4	Sibi Mathew Peedikayil HGN	Bishop - Aitape	2021	Present
5	Joseph Kallarackal	Bishop - Jaipur	2023	Present

== List of Parishes ==
ID	Place	Name	Estd	Tele	Families	Population	H Families	H Populations
1	Alampally	St. Dominic	1965	4869246252	95	475	0	0
2	Amalagiri	St. Thomas	1962	4869280177	145	640	0	0
3	Amaravathy	St. Joseph	1961	04869-222421	220	941	7	43
4	Anakkal	St. Antony	1940	4828202567	580	2350	60	382
5	Anakkara	St. Thomas	1952	4868282244	684	2980	82	334
6	Anavilasam	St. George	1967	4869263326	215	1020	4	17
7	Anchilippa	St. Pius	1955	4828202666	292	1376	17	50
8	Angelvalley	St. Mary	1996	4828214460	285	1333	0	0
9	Anickad	St. Mary	1860	4812551303	689	3476	129	635
10	Aniyartholu	St. Thomas	1996	4868270020	40	183	0	0
11	Azhangad	St. Antony	1960	4869280097	98	500	0	0
12	Bethani Hills	St. Mary	1960	4735270470	31	143	0	0
13	Chakkupallam	Carmala Matha	1998	4868282218	210	1063	1	4
14	Chamampathal	Fathima Matha	1988	4812457106	180	742	13	48
15	Chellarcoil	Mar Sleeva	1995	4868282890	245	1146	10	42
16	Chembalam	St. Mary	1953	4868232522	196	990	2	9
17	Chemmannu	St. Thomas	1952	4869242326	222	1000	8	40
18	Chempanoly	St. Sebastain	1953	4735265933	108	602	6	24
19	Chengalam	St. Antony	1913	4812704332	650	3245	110	654
20	Chenkal	Sacred Heart	1930	4828221413	358	1802	5	32
21	Chennakunnu	St. George	2002	4828228268	122	531	0	0
22	Cheruvallikulam	St. George	1973	4869288022	162	672	1	0
23	Cheruvally	St. Mary	1913	4828247451	342	1684	0	0
24	Chinnar	St. George	1957	4869242354	146	670	4	21
25	Christunagar	St. George	1962	4869288040	103	487	0	0
26	Cumbummettu	St. Joseph	1964	4868279226	290	1289	30	122
27	Edakkunnam	Mary Matha	2003	4828270191	117	540	5	24
28	Edamon	St. Mary	1963	4735260407	110	471	1	3
29	Elamgulam	St. Mary	1895	4828226369	560	2824	35	154
30	Elangoi	Holy Cross	1922	4812456343	227	1017	0	0
31	Elappara-Pallikunnu	St. Alphonsa	1993	4869232497	75	400	4	20
32	Elikkulam	Infant Jesus	1908	4822225319	398	1600	0	0
33	Elivalikkara	St. Antony	1985	4828255145	132	579	2	9
34	Erumely	Assumption Forane	1952	4828210343	354	1784	1	5
35	Grace Mount	Grace Matha	2000	4869325627	78	298	2	9
36	Greenvalley	Infant Jesus	2006	4868228500	67	280	6	26
37	Inchiyani	Holy Family	1938	4828272951	268	1430	1	3
38	Kalthotty	Holy Family	1953	4868271318	410	2050	3	24
39	Kanamala	St. Thomas	1956	4828214235	300	1363	3	13
40	Kanayankavayal	St. Mary	1953	4869288169	330	1551	1	12
41	Kanchiyar	St. Mary	1953	4868271308	330	1024	8	24
42	Kanjirapally	St. Dominic Cathedral	1450	04828-202343,204643	1252	10354	84	425
43	Kannampally	St. Mary	1950	4735270275	134	619	0	0
44	Kannimala	St. Joseph	1953	4828210301	225	1200	11	65
45	Kappadu	Holy Cross	1923	4828235339	765	3825	66	330
46	Karikkattoor	St. Antony	1987	4828247551	190	447	2	8
47	Karikulam	Fathima Matha	1950	4828251213	173	665	66	116
48	Karunapuram	St. Mary	1960	4868279334	188	834	0	0
49	Kattappana	St. George	1953	4868272231	963	4228	18	45
50	Keerikkara	St. Antony	1979	4869258499	118	611	0	0
51	Kochera	St. Joseph	1960	4868285017	281	1054	15	64
52	Kochuthovala	St. Joseph	1985	4868272342	172	800	5	37
53	Kollamula	Maria Goretti	1954	4735264135	530	2597	7	33
54	Konni	St. Jude	2000	4682340554	20	65	0	0
55	Koothattukulam	Assumption	1963	4735255408	34	200	5	30
56	Koovapally	St. Joseph	1956	4828251126	550	2825	50	252
57	Koratty Puthenpally	St. Joseph	1951	4828210417	273	1410	7	64
58	Koruthodu	St. George	1954	4828280235	675	3069	32	138
59	Kozhanchery	Holy Family	2005	4735200568	30	100	0	0
60	Kumily - Attappallam	St. Thomas	1953	4869222091	680	3102	5	28
61	Kunnumbhagam	St. Joseph	1961	4828202681	300	2000	10	45
62	Kurumpanmoozhy	St. Thomas	1996	4735263666	191	840	1	2
63	Kuzhitholu	St. Sebastian	1960	4868279208	288	1421	33	227
64	Madukka	St. Mathew	1997	4828280449	270	1132	10	28
65	Mailapra	St. Joseph	1958	4682300488	22	101	0	0
66	Mangapetta	St. Thomas	1995	4828278687	55	290	10	45
67	Manipuzha	Christ The King	1940	4828254146	205	800	0	0
68	Mariagiri	St. Sebastian	1993	4869244414	142	673	5	27
69	Marykulam	St. George	1956	4869244240	925	4276	45	310
70	Meenkuzhy	Little Flower	1963	4735255408	49	300	5	30
71	Meloram	St. Sebastian	1950	4869280785	135	667	5	20
72	Meppara	Lourde Matha	2005	4868259035	118	440	8	43
73	Mlamala	Fathima Matha	1950	4869258160	400	1780	0	0
74	Mukkoottuthara	St. Thomas	1997	4828254805	185	948	0	0
75	Mukkulam	St. George	1941	4828286167	210	1025	0	0
76	Mulankunnu	Infant Jesus	1993	4869280849	52	270	0	0
77	Mundakayam	Our Lady of Dolours	1937	4828277600	669	3188	29	166
78	Mundiyeruma	Assumption	1957	4868236342	253	1248	6	30
79	Nallathanny	Holy Family	2000	4869288086	28	111	0	0
80	Nariyanpara	Holy Cross	2000	4868250561	108	445	0	0
81	Nasranipuram	St. Mathew	1953	4869222272	154	745	1	4
82	Nettithozhu	St. Isidore	1953	4868285236	420	1921	0	0
83	Neyyattussery	St. George	1955	4828221658	220	960	12	52
84	Niarvu	St. Mary	2005	4735265337	69	318	0	0
85	Nilackal - Thulappally	Marthoma Sleeha	1956	4735244327	314	1668	5	32
86	Nirmalagiri	St. Antony	1963	4869280269	107	557	10	58
87	Nirmalapuram	Holy Family	1963	4868270101	44	241	0	0
88	Padanilam	St. Sebastian	2005	4828228138	62	271	1	4
89	Palampra	Gethsemene	1986	4828202205	198	1192	12	42
90	Palapra	Vimala Matha	1998	4828270001	215	1320	8	36
91	Paloorkavu	St. George	1956	4869286722	196	869	14	48
92	Pampadumpara	St. George	2004	4868270290	56	275	7	25
93	Panapilavu	St. Joseph	1955	4828254168	185	710	4	22
94	Pathanamthitta	Mary Matha Forane	1992	4682221488	90	363	0	0
95	Pazhaya Koratty	St. Mary	1920	4828216330	112	545	0	0
96	Pazhayidom	St. Michael	1924	4828262180	260	1570	0	0
97	Peermade	St. Mary	1961	4869232315	64	291	4	18
98	Periyar Vallakadavu	St. Joseph	1979	4869252425	101	500	7	36
99	Perunadu	St. Jude	2006	4735270450	49	215	0	0
100	Perunthenaruvi	St. Joseph	1963	4735270450	40	215	0	0
101	Peruvanthanam	St. Joseph	1935	4869280095	194	907	1	9
102	Pezhumpara	Sacred Heart	1963	4735252493	110	470	0	0
103	Plachery	Fathima Matha	1952	4735260407	52	215	0	0
104	Podimattam	St. Mary	1937	4828234026	475	2900	18	75
105	Ponkunnam	Holy Family	1891	4828221368	925	4032	85	246
106	Poomattam	St. Thomas	2003	4828252037	64	285	9	25
107	Pulianmala	St. Antony	1994	4868270263	203	820	5	12
108	Pulinkatta	St. George	1960	4869246252	175	700	7	30
109	Pullikkanam	St. Thomas	1965	4869248283	68	322	0	0
110	Punchavayal	St. Sebastian	1978	4828278839	380	1800	16	20
111	Purakkayam	St. Joseph	1991	4869288075	48	246	1	4
112	Puttady	Velankanny Matha	2000	4868277581	198	838	5	18
113	Rajagiri	Christu Raj	1963	4869240030	264	1101	15	116
114	Ramakkalmettu	Sacred Heart	1978	4868236539	170	814	3	13
115	Ranni	Infant Jesus Forane	2000	4735225962	115	395	2	12
116	Santhigiri	St. George	1996	4868282763	110	454	4	17
117	Sanyasioda	Infant Jesus	2005	4868223361	61	237	0	0
118	Seethathodu	St. George	1963	4735258211	76	312	3	15
119	Swaraj	St. Paul	2000	4868271647	183	739	21	127
120	Thamarakunnu	St. Ephrem	1891	4828230645	591	3450	9	45
121	Thampalackadu	St. Thomas	1912	4828226150	269	1290	15	125
122	Tharakanattukunnu	St. Antony	1927	4828262139	286	1420	2	8
123	Thekkemala	St. Mary	1952	4869286727	340	1581	1	5
124	Third Camp	St. Joseph	1983	4868236422	130	601	0	0
125	Uluppooni	St. Alphonsa	2000	4869248537	29	128	0	0
126	Umikuppa	Lourde Matha	1954	4828214275	300	1400	2	8
127	Upputhara	St. Mary Forane	1919	4869244222	640	2654	42	169
128	Vadakkemala	St. Sebastian	1975	9387662196	68	328	2	7
129	Vakayar	Infant Jesus	2005	0	0	0	0	
130	Valiyathovala	Christ Raj	1952	4868276210	512	2290	17	80
131	Vallakadavu	St. Antony	1959	4868272302	520	2302	27	115
132	Vanchimala	St. Antony	1991	4828235102	137	693	8	61
133	Vandanmedu	St. Antony	1953	4868277047	250	1100	7	33
134	Vandanpathal	St. Paul	1966	4828272249	220	850	5	20
135	Vechoochira	St. Joseph	1983	4735265337	246	1405	7	7
136	Velichiyani	St. Thomas	1925	4828270414	645	3225	65	277
137	Vellaramkunnu	St. Mary	1955	4869263356	567	2653	17	78
138	Wallardy	Holy Cross	1969	4869252352	164	788	0	0

== Saints and causes for canonisation ==
- Servant of God Bernhard Thanhauser (Fortunatus)

== See also ==
- Saint Thomas Christian
