= Mathew Vattackuzhy =

- Eparch of Kanjirappally
- Church: Syro-Malabar Church
- Diocese: Eparchy of Kanjirappally
- In office: 20 December 1986 – 23 December 2000
- Predecessor: Joseph Powathil
- Successor: Mathew Arackal

Orders
- Ordination: 1 June 1956
- Consecration: 26 February 1987 by Joseph Powathil

Personal details
- Born: 20 February 1920 Chenkal, Kingdom of Travancore, British Empire
- Died: 22 November 2016 (aged 96)

Mathew Vattackuzhy (20 February 1930 – 22 November 2016) was a Syro-Malabar bishop.

Ordained to the priesthood in 1956, Vattackuzhy served as bishop of the Syro-Malabar Catholic Eparchy of Kanjirappally. India, from 1986 to 2000.
