= Jose Pulickal =

Mar Jose Pulickal
- Bishop of Kanjirappally
- Church: Syro-Malabar Catholic Church
- Archdiocese: Syro-Malabar Catholic Archeparchy of Changanassery
- Diocese: Syro-Malabar Catholic Eparchy of Kanjirappally
- Appointed: 15 January 2020
- Installed: 3 February 2020
- Predecessor: Mathew Arackal
- Other post: Titular Bishop of Lares (2016–2020)

Orders
- Ordination: 1 January 1991
- Consecration: 4 February 2016

Personal details
- Born: Jose Pulickal; 3 March 1964 (age 62) Inchiyani, Kerala, India
- Denomination: Syro-Malabar Catholic
- Residence: Bishop’s House, Kanjirapally

Mar Jose Pulickal (born 3 March 1964) is an Indian prelate of the Syro-Malabar Catholic Church who has served as the Bishop of Kanjirappally since 2020. He previously served as Auxiliary Bishop of Kanjirappally and Titular Bishop of Lares from 2016 to 2020.

== Early life and education ==
Jose Pulickal was born on 3 March 1964 at Inchiyani in Kerala, India. After completing his pre-degree studies, he joined the Mary Matha Minor Seminary at Podimattam. He pursued priestly formation at St Thomas Apostolic Seminary, Vadavathoor.

He later undertook higher studies in Bengaluru, obtaining a Licentiate degree in biblical theology from St. Peter's Pontifical Institute and a doctorate from Pontifical Athenaeum Dharmaram Vidya Kshetram.

== Priestly ministry ==
Pulickal was ordained a priest for the Eparchy of Kanjirapally on 1 January 1991. He began his ministry as assistant vicar of Kanjirapally Cathedral and as director of Vettukadu Snehashram, also known as Jesus Fraternity.

He held several responsibilities within the diocese, including director of catechesis, forane vicar, diocesan consultor and protosyncellus for Ranni and Pathanamthitta.

== Episcopacy ==
During a meeting of the Synod of Bishops of the Syro-Malabar Major Archiepiscopal Church, Pulickal was elected Auxiliary Bishop of Kanjirapally. The appointment was confirmed by Pope Francis on 12 January 2016, and he was simultaneously appointed Titular Bishop of Lares.

He was consecrated bishop on 4 February 2016 at St Dominic's Cathedral, Kanjirapally, and assumed office the same day.

Following the resignation of Bishop Mathew Arackal upon reaching the canonical age of retirement, Pulickal was elected Bishop of Kanjirapally by the Synod. The appointment was officially announced on 15 January 2020 at the Vatican and at Mount St Thomas, Kakkanad.

His episcopal enthronement took place on 3 February 2020, when he formally assumed charge of the eparchy.

== See also ==
- Syro-Malabar Catholic Church
- Eparchy of Kanjirappally
