= James Kalacherry =

Indian archbishop

Mar James Kalassery
- Bishop of Changanassery
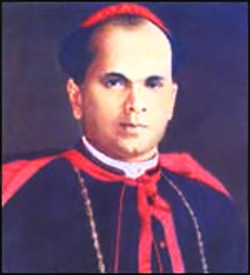
- Appointed: 29 Oct 1927
- Installed: 29 Oct 1927
- Term ended: 27 Oct 1949
- Predecessor: Thomas Kurialacherry
- Successor: Mathew Kavukattu

Orders
- Ordination: 19 Apr 1919
- Consecration: by Bishop Francis Vazhapilly

James Kalacherry (20 April 1892 – 27 October 1949) was an Indian educationalist and bishop of the Syro-Malabar Catholic Church, taking charge of the Diocese of Changanassery.

Kalacherry was born on 20 April 1892 in Kainakary. He was ordained priest at the age of 27 on 19 April 1919, and as Rev Dr James Kalacherry, served as lecturer in logic at St. Berchmans College, Changanassery, Kottayam, Kerala.

In 1927, he was appointed Bishop of Changanacherry (Syro-Malabarese church), India.

On 19 May 1930 Bishop Kalacherry presided over the ceremony when Sister Alphonsa joined the Franciscan Clarist Congregation at St. Mary's Forane Church, Bharananganam. Sister Alphonsa was canonised as India's first female Catholic saint on 9 November 2008.

In 1933, he founded the Missionary Congregation of the Blessed Sacrament (MCBS) in the mission church at Mallappally.

Bishop Kalacherry also founded the Catholic Action group of the diocese.

In 1945, he campaigned against the move by C. P. Ramaswami Iyer, the then Diwan of Travancore, to nationalise all schools. Bishop Kalacherry founded Assumption College, in central Travancore on 12 August 1949, providing tertiary education for women.

He died in office at the age of 57 on 27 October 1949 and was buried at St. Mary's Cathedral in Changanassery, which was his own parish.
