= Archeparchy of Kalyan =

Eastern Catholic Archeparchy in Maharashtra, India

Archeparchy of Kalyan ܐܪܟܝܕܝܘܩܝܐ ܕܟܲܠܝܵܢ

Location
- Country: India
- Territory: Civil districts Mumbai City, Mumbai Suburban, Thane, Raigad, Pune, Palghar, Nasik, Kolhapur, Sangli, Sindhudurg, Ratnagiri, Satara, Solapur, Dhule, Jalgaon, Nandurbar, Ahmednagar, Aurangabad, Jalna, Parbhani, Beed (Bhir), Nanded, Latur, Osmanabad, Buldhana, and Akola, together with the entire State of Goa, comprising the two civil districts of South Goa and North Goa.

Statistics
- Population: (as of 2013); 1,00,000
- Parishes: 101

Information
- Denomination: Catholic Church
- Sui iuris church: Syro-Malabar Catholic Church
- Rite: East Syriac Rite
- Cathedral: Cathedral of St Thomas in Kalyan, India
- Patron saint: St. Thomas Apostle
- Secular priests: 176

Current leadership
- Pope: Mar Leo XIV
- Major Archbishop: Mar Raphael Thattil
- Metropolitan Archbishop: Mar Sebastian Vaniyapurackal ܣܒܣܛܝܢ ܘܢܝܐܦܘܪܟܠ
- Suffragans: Eparchy of Chanda; Eparchy of Rajkot
- Bishops emeritus: Mar Thomas Elavanal ܡܵܪܝ ܬܐܘܿܡܐܵ ܐܲܦܸܣܩܘܿܦܵܐ

Website
- Website of the Diocese Android App

The Archeparchy of Kalyan is an Eastern Catholic Archeparchy in India within the Syro-Malabar Church, based in Kalyan, India. The eparchy was established to cater the spiritual needs of the Syro Malabar Christians based in the Indian State of Maharashtra including the metropolitan cities of Mumbai, Pune and Nasik. Its first bishop was Mar Paul Chittilapilly. The Eparchy celebrated its silver jubilee in the year 2013. Mar Thomas Elavanal MCBS then shepherded the Eparchy until 2025. The second session of the xxxiii synod of bishops of the Syro-Malabar Church elected Mar Sebastian Vaniyapurackal the then curia bishop of the Syro-Malabar Church to the office of the bishop of Kalyan.

== Establishment ==
Migration of the Syro-Malabar Catholics to Mumbai and other major cities of Maharashtra like Pune, Nasik, etc. and other parts of our country, started in nineteen fifties and sixties after Indian Independence, seeking employment and better prospects of life. Hundreds of thousands of Christians of the Syro-Malabar Church who thus migrated were in a totally alien atmosphere with regard to their religious and spiritual life. They depended on the local Latin Church for their spiritual needs in the absence of Syro-Malabar jurisdiction. The priests of the Latin Dioceses were taking care of their spiritual needs. Yet they preferred to preserve their ecclesial traditions and heritage intact and to transmit them to their children. A formation in keeping with the spiritual, liturgical and ecclesial traditions of the Mother Church was obviously lacking. In order to preserve their faith and cultural heritage intact, the Syro-Malabar Catholics organized several spiritual exercises like the Lenten retreats and confessions, prayer meetings, Holy Mass Celebrations, etc.

In the light of the teachings of the II Vatican council, the problems related to the migration as well as the theology and ecclesiology of individual Churches were taken for discussions in CBCI meetings especially by Mar Joseph Powathil. Articles and memorandum prepared and published by Fr. Placid Podippara, Msgr. Mathew Vellanickal, Fr. Xavier Koodapuzha have caused warmth for discussions. In fact an all India seminar "The Church in India Today" paved the way to seriously discuss on this matter. The conclusions, suggestions, recommendations of the seminar were adopted by the CBCI and Committee for Rites was formed to deepen the matter. It was Pope John Paul I, who appointed an Apostolic Visitor, Mar Antony Padiyara, on 8 September 1978 to study the situation of the migrant Syro-Malabar Catholics. Fr. Xavier Koodapuzha was the secretary of the Apostolic Visitor. On 3 February 1979 to study the life situation and problems of Syro-Malabar Catholics Mar Antony Padiyara reached Mumbai and Kerala Catholic Association gave him all the necessary helps to study the situations especially the problems of Nurses. Eighteen meetings were held in different parts of Mumbai from 4 February 1979 to 18 February 1979.

A report was submitted in 1980. The matter was discussed in the CBCI from 1982 to 1985. At last, in the Synod held at Rome in 1985, the Bishops from the Oriental Churches spoke strongly on the rights of the Oriental Churches in India. On 1 February 1986 when Pope John Paul II addressed the Bishops of India in Delhi, he assured them of an earlier settlement of the problem and elicited the co-operation of all concerned. This was followed by the appointment of a high level Pontifical Commission. On the basis of this Commission's report, came the all-important letter of Pope John Paul II to the Bishops of India on 28 May 1987. On 30 April 1988, Pope John Paul II established the Eparchy of Kalyan comprising the areas of Bombay, Pune and Nasik. On 4 May 1988, the Apostolic Pre-Nuncio served the letter concerning the erection of the New Eparchy of Kalyan. This also involved the appointment of its very first bishop Mar Paul Chittilapilly. On 24 August 1988, the Eparchy of Kalyan was inaugurated. Along with this, there also took place the consecration of its first Bishop Mar Paul Chittilapilly. On 29 June 1991, the first curia of the Eparchy was set up which involved the Vicar General, the Chancellor and the Finance Officer. In August 1991, the Bishop’s House was inaugurated at Powai. On 8 February 1997, Mar Thomas Elavanal was consecrated and enthroned as the new Bishop of the Eparchy of Kalyan. For facilitating the formation of seminarians aspiring to become priests in the eparchy of Kalyan, the Eparchial Minor Seminary was blessed and inaugurated by Mar Thomas Elavanal at Panvel on 1 July 2006. On 20 November 2011, the Cathedral church of the Eparchy (St Thomas Cathedral Church) was consecrated and blessed in Kalyan West. On 2 October 2012, the Animation and Renewal Centre (ARC) was blessed in Panvel. In November 2013, the Eparchy of Kalyan celebrated its silver jubilee year.

== Parishes under the Archeparchy of Kalyan ==
There are, at present, 101 parishes under the Eparchy of Kalyan. The Cathedral Church of the Eparchy is in Kalyan West (St Thomas Cathedral Church). There are 14 foranes in the Eparchy of Kalyan: Andheri, Antop Hill, Borivli, Kalina, Kalyan, Malad, Nasik, Navi Mumbai, Panvel, Powai, Pune, South-Mumbai, Thane and Vasai.

== Ordinaries ==
Bishops and Archbishops

Sl.no	Ordinary	Designation	Date and Year of appointment	Date and Last year of service
1	Paul Chittilapilly	Bishop	24 August 1988	18 December 1996
2	Thomas Elavanal	Bishop	8 February 1997	28 August 2025
3	Sebastian Vaniyapurackal	Metropolitan Archbishop	28 August 2025	Present

== Saints connected with the Eparchy ==
- St. Bartholomew the Apostle is considered to have done missionary activity in the Kalyan region.

== Ecclesiastical Province of Kalyan ==
With the prior consent of the Holy Father, and the unanimous decision of the synod of bishops of the Syro-Malabar Church the Major Archbishop Mar Raphael Thattil has erected the eparchy of Kalyan to an Archeparchy with Kalyan as its Metropolitan See on 28 August 2025.
