= Marykulam =

Village in Kerala, India

- Village
- Interactive map of Marykulam
- Location in Kerala, India Marykulam (India)
- Coordinates: 9°41′48″N 77°2′22″E
- Country: India
- State: Kerala
- District: Idukki
- Taluk: Udumbanchola

Government
  - Type: Panchayat
  - Body: Ayyappancoil Grama Panchayat

Languages
  - Official: Malayalam, English
- Time zone: UTC+5:30 (IST)
- PIN: 685507
- Area code: 04868
- Vehicle registration: KL-69, KL-37

Marykulam is a village in Udumbanchola taluk of Idukki district in the Indian state of Kerala. It comes under the administration of Ayyappancoil panchayat. It is situated 15 km (9.3 mi) from Kattappana, 25 km (16 mi) from Kumily and 3 km (1.9 mi) from Upputhara.

== Educational institutions ==
- Govt. L.P. School, Mattukatta
- Grace Garden Public School, Mattukatta
- Marian Public School, Marykulam
- St. Joseph's Nursery School, Marykulam
- St. Mary's H.S.S, Marykulam
- St. Mary's High School, Marykulam
- St. Mary's L.P. School, Marykulam
- St. Mary's U.P. School, Marykulam
