= Podimattom =

Village in Kottayam District, Kerala, India

Podimattom is a small village located at Kanjirappally Taluk, Kottayam district, Kerala, India.

== Location ==
Podimattom lies very near to Kanjirappally.

== Village of Seminaries ==
Podimattom has various Christian religious institutions in and around this area. It can also be called a village of seminaries and nuns houses.

== Education ==
St. Dominic's College is a famous college located in the same area. Podimattom can be called as the gateway of highranges. Hills and mountains are visible in the area.

== Vegetation ==
The village is covered with rubber plantations and other crops. The place becomes hot in summer and receives a good rainfall throughout the year.

== Climate ==
Winter is really chilled in the locality.
