= K. Chappathu =

- village
- Location in Kerala, India K. Chappathu (India)
- Coordinates: 9.666°N 77.020°E
- Country: India
- State: Kerala
- District: Idukki

Government
  - Type: Panchayath

Languages
  - Official: Malayalam, English
- Time zone: UTC+5:30 (IST)
- PIN: 685505
- Vehicle registration: KL-37

K. Chappathu (also known as K. Chappath or Karimkulam Chappathu) is a village located in the Idukki district of Kerala, India. K. Chappathu is between Kuttikkanam and Kattappana, and contains both tea and coffee plantations. It is the place where agitation for Mullaperiyar new dam continues from 2006.
