= Paul Chittilapilly =

Catholic prelate (1934–2020)

- Bishop of Kalyan; Bishop of Thamarassery
- Church: Syro-Malabar Church
- Diocese: Thamarassery

Orders
- Ordination: 18 October 1961 by Archbishop Mathew Kavukattu
- Consecration: 24 August 1988 by Archbishop Antony Padiyara

Personal details
- Born: February 7, 1934 Mattom, Kerala
- Died: September 6, 2020 (aged 86) Kozhikode, Kerala
- Education: Pontifical Lateran University (Ph.D.)

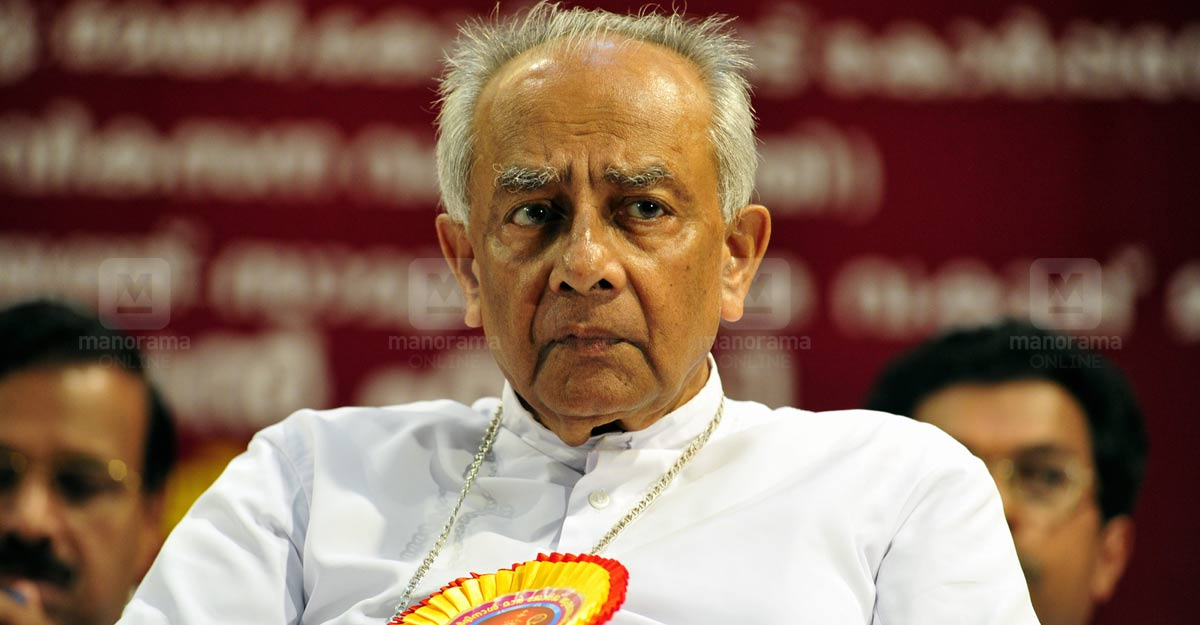
Mar Paul Chittilappilly

Paul Chittilapilly (7 February 1934 – 6 September 2020) was a bishop of the Syro-Malabar Catholic Church.

Chittilapilly was born in Mattom in the Thrissur district of Kerala and was ordained to the priesthood in 1961. Following his return from the Pontifical Lateran University in Rome, he was appointed professor at St. Thomas’ Apostolic Seminary in Kottayam. In 1978, he was appointed vicar general of the Archeparchy of Trichur.

He was the first bishop of the Archeparchy of Kalyan and served from 1988 to 1996 and as bishop of the Eparchy of Thamarassery from 1996 to 2010.
