= Mathew Arackal =

Catholic bishop in Kerala, India

Mar Mathew Arackal
- Bishop Emeritus of Eparchy of Kanjirappally
- Archdiocese: Syro-Malabar Catholic Archeparchy of Changanassery
- Diocese: Syro-Malabar Catholic Eparchy of Kanjirappally
- Term ended: 15 January 2020
- Predecessor: Mar Mathew Vattakuzhy
- Successor: Mar Jose Pulickal

Orders
- Ordination: 13 March 1971 by Mar Antony Padiyara
- Consecration: 9 February 2001
- Rank: Bishop

Personal details
- Born: 10 December 1944 (age 81) Erumely
- Denomination: Catholic Church
- Residence: Bishop's House, Kanjirappally
- Education: St. Thomas Apostolic Seminary, Vadavathoor

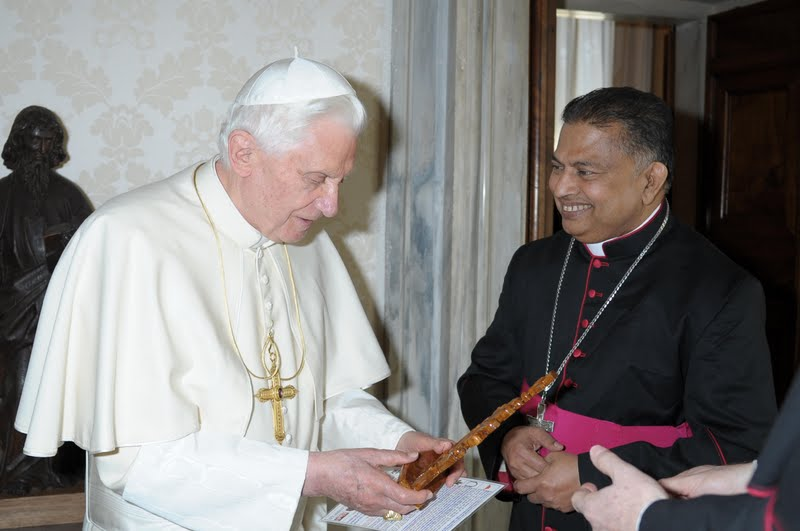
Mar Mathew Arackal, Bishop of Kanjirapally, with Pope Benedict XVI.

Mar Mathew Arackal is a bishop of the Syro Malabar Catholic Church and an active champion in issues of the environment and society. He served as Head of the Eparchy of Kanjirappally from 9 February 2001 to 2 February 2020. He was also the Chairman of the Syro-Malabar Church Commission for the Laity.

== Early life and education ==
Bishop Arackal was born on 10 December 1944, at Erumely, in the Kottayam district of Kerala State, India. He studied at St. Thomas High School, Erumely, and St Berchman's College, Changanacherry, and then pursued his priestly studies at St. Thomas Minor Seminary, Changanacherry, and at St. Thomas Apostolic Seminary, Vadavathoor, Kottayam for studying philosophy and theology.

== Career ==
Mathew Arackal completed philosophical and theological studies at the age of 25 and was ordained to the priesthood on 13 March 1971 by Archbishop Cardinal Mar Antony Padiyara. From 1971 to 1974, he served as the Assistant Vicar of Amboori Church, Director of Samaritan Hospital, Amboori and the Estates Manager for the Syro-Malabar Catholic Archeparchy of Changanassery. In 1974 he was appointed Assistant Procurator of the Archdiocese of Changanacherry. During that time, he helped to establish the first Labour Co-operative Society in Kerala.

When the Eparchy of Kanjirappally was erected in 1977, he was appointed the Vicar of Peermedu and Murinjapuzha by Bishop Mar Joseph Powathil. In 1980, he started the Peermedu Development Society (PDS) and served as its executive director till 2001. PDS's purpose was to protect the interests of the aboriginal tribes in the mountain ranges as well as their environment. Bishop Arackal is an advocate of organic farming methods and organic food crops. He helped found a charitable trust to arrange gainful employment for women and the marginalised sections of the community. He also established the High Range Medical Centre (HRMC) at Pothupara, Idukki, Sahyadri Ayurvedic Pharmaceuticals at Kuttikanam, two major residential training centres for rural development with research wings and lab facilities in Biotechnology and Eco-farming. He initiated the establishment of Marian College, Kuttikkanam in 1995.

Mathew Arackal was involved in the International Red Cross. He was appointed to serve in various secular offices of the government. He was the Governing Board Member of the Kerala State Continued Education; the Member of the Kerala State Academic Council; the Technical Advisor for the Rajeev Gandhi Water Mission of the Government of India and the Department of Science and Technology of the Government of India. He was selected as the Resource Person of CAPART (Council for Advancement of People's Action and Rural Technology) of the Government of India, Kerala State Farming Corporation; The Task Force for Participatory Planning; State Council for Education, Research and Training; Watershed Development and Management Evaluation Team. Until 2007, he was the only representative from Asia and Africa to the International Delegate Assembly of Naturland, Germany.

Mar Mathew Arackal was appointed Bishop of Kanjirappally by Pope John Paul II on 19 January 2001. He took the call of Jesus Christ in John 10:10 'Life in its fullness' as his episcopal motto. He embarked on various spiritual, cultural, social and development projects for the diocese and the State. He established the Amal Jyothi College of Engineering Kanjirappally and the Sahyadri Co-operative Bank. He piloted various development works at Marian College, Kuttikanam; MMT Hospital Mundakayam and various other schools, infirmaries and institutions. He also continued his work with the Malanadu Development Society and the Peermeade Development Society.

In 2003 Arackal was appointed Advisor to the Planning Commission of India and later in 2010, the Judging Committee Member of the Indira Gandhi Paryavan Puraskar (Environmental Award) constituted by the Government of India

He was the Chairman of Kerala Social Service Forum (KSSF), an umbrella organisation of the Catholic Social Service organisations in the State of Kerala, from 2001 to 2010; Chairman of KCBC Commission for Justice, Peace and Development; Member of the CBCI Commission for Scheduled Caste, Tribes and Backward Classes and the Bishop representative of Functional Vocational Training Forum (FVTF) of the CBCI. In the Media, he previously served as Chairman of the Jeevan Telecasting Corporation Ltd and Chairman of Rashtra Deepika Ltd. Apart from his diocesan duties, he is also heavily involved in the worldwide Church as the Chairman of the Laity Commission.

In 2013, Bishop Arackal was in the news as a spokesman for the poor farmers in Idukki District who were protesting because their livelihood was being threatened by changes in Kerala environmental regulations. In 2015, he led a group of farmers in a fast to protest low crop prices. He rejuvenated many lives in the region.
