= List of Syro-Malabar Catholic eparchies and bishops =

The Syro-Malabar Church, an Eastern Catholic church of the Catholic Church, traces its origin to apostolic times. Historically, the church developed as the Malabar Church, a suffragan of the Metropolis of Persia and India under the Church of the East and later elevated as the Metropolis of All India of the Church of the East in the seventh century by Patriarch Ishoʿyahb III. It had the jurisdiction all over India. After the Schism of 1552, the church was integrated with the Chaldean Catholic Church as the Archdiocese of Angamaly.The efforts of the Portuguese Padroado to liturgical latinisation under the Latin Church archidiocese that culminated in the Synod of Diamper in 1599, led to a suppression of the Syro-Malabar customs and rites, and liturgical Latinisation. In the 20th century, Syro-Malabar Catholics attained greater autonomy and were ultimately made a major archeparchal sui iuris church and regained its all India jurisdiction by 2017.

== Cardinals from the Syro Malabar Church ==
Non-elector
Elector

Rank	Coat of arms/seal	Cardinal	Eparchy/Archeparchy	Titular Church	Other Posts
Cardinal-Priest		Mar George Cardinal Alenchery	Major Metropolitanate of Ernakulam–Angamaly	Title of San Bernardo alle Terme	Major Archbishop Emeritus of Ernakulam–Angamaly, member of the Dicastery for the Eastern Churches and International Council for Catechesis, age 81.
Cardinal-Deacon		Mar George Jacob Cardinal Koovakad	Metropolitanate of Changanassery	Deconary of Sant'Antonio di Padova a Circonvallazione Appia	Prefect of the Dicastery for Interreligious Dialogue and member of the Dicastery for the Eastern Churches, age 52.

== Major Archbishop of the Syro Malabar Church ==
Major Archbishop/ Major-Metropolitan

His Beatitude
Maran Mar
Raphael Thattil
ܡܳܪܝ ܪܰܦܳܐܝܶܠ ܛܰܛܺܝܠ

Title

Head of Syro Malabar Church
President of the Holy Synod of Syro Malabar Church
Metropolitan and Gate of All India
Successor to the See of Mar Thoma Sleeha
Archeparch of Ernakulam-Angamaly
Metropolitan of the province of Ernakulam-Angamaly

Seat
Major Metropolitanate of Ernakulam–Angamaly &

Major-Archiepiscopal Curia, Mount St. Thomas

== Bishop of the Major Archepiscopial Curia ==
Post / Seat	Bishop's coat of arms/seal	Eparch	Title
Curia Bishop
Major Archiepiscopal Curia, Mount St. Thomas		vacant	Curia Bishop

== Eparchies under Syro-Malabar provinces and their Hierarchs ==
Emeritus or Retired hierarchs
Cardinal Major Archbishop Emeritus

Eparchy	Eparchy coat of arms/seal	Eparch	Title
=== Ecclesiastical Province of Ernakulam-Angamaly ===
Major Metropolitanate of Ernakulam–Angamaly		Mar Raphael Thattil	Metropolitan Major Archeparch of Erankulam-Angamaly
Major Metropolitanate of Ernakulam–Angamaly		Mar Joseph Pamplany	Major Archiepiscopial Vicar of the Major Archeparch
Major Metropolitanate of Ernakulam–Angamaly		Mar George Cardinal Alenchery	Metropolitan Major Archeparch emeritus of Eranakulam-Angamaly
Major Metropolitanate of Ernakulam–Angamaly		Mar Antony Kariyil CMI	Major Archiepiscopal Vicar emeritus of Eranakulam-Angamaly
Major Metropolitanate of Ernakulam–Angamaly		Mar Thomas Chakiath	Auxiliary Eparch emeritus of Eranakulam-Angamaly
Eparchy of Idukki		Mar John Nellikkunnel	Eparch of Idukki
Eparchy of Kothamangalam		Mar George Madathikandathil	Eparch of Kothamangalam
Eparchy of Kothamangalam		Mar George Punnakottil	Eparch emeritus of Kothamangalam
=== Ecclesiastical Province of Chanaganassery ===
Metropolitanate of Changanassery		Mar Thomas Tharayil	Metropolitan Archeparch of Changanassery
Metropolitanate of Changanassery		Mar Joseph Perumthottam	Metropolitan Archeparch emeritus of Changanassery
Eparchy of Kanjirappally		Mar Jose Pulickal	Eparch of Kanjirappally
Eparchy of Kanjirappally		Mar Mathew Arackal	Eparch emeritus of Kanjirappally
Eparchy of Palai		Mar Joseph Kallarangatt	Eparch of Palai
Eparchy of Palai		Mar Joseph Pallikaparampil	Eparch emeritus of Palai
Eparchy of Palai		Mar Jacob Muricken	Auxiliary Eparch emeritus of Palai
Eparchy of Thuckalay		Mar George Rajendran SDB	Eparch of Thuckalay
=== Ecclesiastical Province of Faridabad ===
Metropolitanate of Faridabad		Mar Kuriakose Bharanikulangara	Metropolitan Archeparch of Faridabad
Metropolitanate of Faridabad		Mar Jose Puthenveettil	Auxiliary Eparch of Faridabad
Eparchy of Bijnor		Mar Vincent Nellaiparambil	Eparch of Bijnor
Eparchy of Bijnor		Mar John Vadakel CMI	Eparch emeritus of Bijnor
Eparchy of Bijnor		Mar Gratian Mundadan CMI	Eparch emeritus of Bijnor
Eparchy of Gorakhpur		Mar Mathew Nellikunnel	Eparch of Gorakhpur
Eparchy of Gorakhpur		Mar Thomas Thuruthimattam CST	Eparch emeritus of Gorakhpur
=== Ecclesiastical Province of Kalyan ===
Metropolitanate of Kalyan		Mar Sebastian Vaniyapurackal	Metropolitan Archeparch of Kalyan
Metropolitanate of Kalyan		Mar Thomas Elavanal MCBS	Eparch emeritus of Kalyan
Eparchy of Chanda		Mar Ephrem Nariculam	Eparch of Chanda
Eparchy of Chanda		Mar Vijay Anand Nedumpuram CMI	Eparch emeritus of Chanda
Eparchy of Rajkot		Mar Jose Chittooparambil CMI	Eparch of Rajkot
=== Ecclesiastical Province of Shamshbad ===
Metropolitanate of Shamshabad		Mar Antony Panengaden	Metropolitan Archeparch of Shamshabad
Metropolitanate of Shamshabad		Mar Joseph Kollamparambil	First Auxiliary Eparch of Shamshabad
Metropolitanate of Shamshabad		Mar Thomas Padiyath	Second Auxiliary Eparch of Shamshabad
Eparchy of Adilabad		Mar Joseph Thachaparambath CMI	Eparch of Adilabad
Eparchy of Adilabad		Mar Joseph Kunnath CMI	Eparch emeritus of Adilabad
=== Ecclesiastical Province of Thrissur ===
Metropolitanate of Thrissur		Mar Andrews Thazhath	Metropolitan Archeparch of Thrissur
Metropolitanate of Thrissur		Mar Tony Neelankavil	Auxiliary Eparch of Thrissur
Eparchy of Hosur		Mar Sebastian Pozholiparampil	Eparch of Hosur
Eparchy of Irinjalakuda		Mar Pauly Kannookadan	Eparch of Irinjalakuda
Eparchy of Palghat (Palakkad)		Mar Peter Kochupurackal	Eparch of Palghat
Eparchy of Palghat (Palakkad)		Mar Jacob Manathodath	Eparch emeritus of Palghat
Eparchy of Ramanathapuram		Mar Paul Alappatt	Eparch of Ramanathapuram
=== Ecclesiastical Province of Thalassery ===
Metropolitanate of Tellicherry (Thalassery)		Mar Joseph Pamplany	Metropolitan Archeparch of Tellicherry
Metropolitanate of Tellicherry (Thalassery)		Mar George Njaralakatt	Metropolitan Archeparch emeritus of Tellicherry
Metropolitanate of Tellicherry (Thalassery)		Mar George Valiamattam	Metropolitan Archeparch emeritus of Tellicherry
Eparchy of Belthangady		Mar James Patteril CMF	Eparch of Belthangady
Eparchy of Belthangady		Mar Lawrence Mukkuzhy	Eparch emeritus of Belthangady
Eparchy of Bhadravathi		Mar Joseph Arumachadath MCBS	Eparch of Bhadravathi
Eparchy of Mananthavady		Mar Jose Porunnedom	Eparch of Manathavady
Eparchy of Mananthavady		Mar Alex Tharamangalam	Auxiliary Eparch of Mananthavady
Eparchy of Mandya		Mar Sebastian Adayantharath	Eparch of Mandya
Eparchy of Thamarassery		Mar Remigiose Inchananiyil	Eparch of Thamarassery
=== Ecclesiastical Province of Ujjain ===
Metropolitanate of Ujjain		Mar Sebastian Vadakkel MST	Metropolitan Archeparch of Ujjain
Eparchy of Jagdalpur		Mar Joseph Kollamparampil CMI	Eparch of Jagdalpur
Eparchy of Sagar		Mar James Athikalam MST	Eparch of Sagar
Eparchy of Sagar		Mar Anthony Chirayath	Eparch emeritus of Sagar
Eparchy of Satna		Mar Joseph Kodakallil	Eparch of Satna
Eparchy of Satna		Mar Matthew Vaniakizhakel VC	Eparch emeritus of Satna
=== Archeparchy of Kottayam for Knanaya ===
Metropolitanate of Kottayam		Mar Mathew Moolakkatt	Archeparch of Kottayam
Metropolitanate of Kottayam		Mar Joseph Pandarasseril	Auxiliary Eparch of Kottayam
Metropolitanate of Kottayam		Gheevarghese Mar Aprem	Auxiliary Eparch of Kottayam for the Malankara Rite faithful

== Eparchies immediately subject to the Holy See ==
Emeritus or Retired hierarchs

Eparchy	Eparchy coat of arms/seal	Territory	Eparch	Title
=== North America ===
Eparchy of St Thomas the Apostle of Chicago		United States of America	Mar Joy Alappatt	Eparch of St. Thomas the Apostle of Chicago
Eparchy of St Thomas the Apostle of Chicago		United States of America	Mar Jacob Angadiath	Eparch emeritus of St. Thomas the Apostle of Chicago
Eparchy of Mississauga		Canada	Mar Jose Kalluvelil	Eparch of Mississauga
=== Oceania ===
Eparchy of St Thomas the Apostle of Melbourne		Australia, New Zealand and Oceania	Mar John Panamthottathil CMI	Eparch of St. Thomas of Melbourne
Eparchy of St Thomas the Apostle of Melbourne		Australia, New Zealand and Oceania	Mar Bosco Puthur	Eparch emeritus of St. Thomas the Apostle of Melbourne
=== Europe ===
Eparchy of Great Britain		Great Britain (United Kingdom)	Mar Joseph Srampickal	Eparch of Great Britain

== Apostolic Visitations ==
=== Apostolic Visitations under direct jurisdiction of the Major Archbishop ===
Visitation	Visitation coat of arms/seal	Territory	Apostolic Visitator	Title
Europe		(Austria) (Belgium) (Denmark) (Finland) (France) (Germany) (Netherlands) (Republic of Ireland) (Italy) (Malta) (Norway) (Portugal) (Spain) (Sweden) (Switzerland)	Mar Stephen Chirappanath	Apostolic Visitator for the Syro Malabar faithful in Europe
Arabian Peninsula		(Bahrain) (Kuwait) (Oman) (Qatar) (Saudi Arabia) (United Arab Emirates) (Yemen)	Fr. Jolly Vadakken	Apostolic Visitator for the Syro-Malabar faithful in the Arabian Peninsula

== Hierarchs working for the Holy See ==
Emeritus or Retired Hierarchs
Cardinals

Post / Seat	Bishop's coat of arms/seal	Eparch	Title
Roman Curia
Dicastery for Interreligious Dialogue, Holy See		Mar George Jacob Cardinal Koovakad	Prefect of the Dicastery for Interreligious Dialogue
Propaganda Fide - Diplomatic Posts
Apostolic Nunciature of Chile		Mar Kurian Vayalunkal	Titular Archbishop of Ratiaria and Apostolic Nuncio to Chile
Apostolic Nunciature of Uruguay		Mar George Panikulam	Titular Archbishop of Caudium and Apostolic Nuncio Emeritus to Uruguay
Apostolic Nunciature of Bangladesh		Mar George Kocherry	Titular Archbishop of Othona and Apostolic Nuncio emeritus to Bangladesh

== Timeline ==
- May 20, 1887 Two independent Vicariates of Kottayam (present Changanassery^{1}) and Thrissur^{2} for Syrians; Charles Lavigne and Adolf Medlycott were made Vicar Apostolic respectively (Quod Jampridem, Pope Leo XIII).
- September 16, 1890 Seat of Kottayam Vicariate moved to Changanassery
- July 28, 1896 Vicariate of Ernakulam^{3} created, with territories from both Vicariates of Changanassery and Thrissur, and Bishop Louis Pazheparambil, Bishop Mathew Makkil, and Bishop John Menachery were made the bishops respectively (Quae Rei Sacrae, Pope Leo XIII).
- July 28, 1896 Vicariate of Kottayam renamed as the Vicariate of Changanassery
- August 29, 1911 Establishment of the Vicariate of Kottayam^{4} for the Knanaya (Southists) Community of the Syrians.
- December 21, 1923 Vicariates of Thrissur, Changanassery and Kottayam raised as Eparchies.
- December 21, 1923 Vicariate of Ernakulam raised as a Metropolitan Archieparchy with suffragan sees of Thrissur, Kottayam and Changanassery.
- December 21, 1923 Establishment of the Syro-Malabar Hierarchy and elevating the Syro-Malabar Church as a Metropolitan Sui iuris Church
- July 25, 1950 Eparchy of Pala^{5}
- December 31, 1953 Eparchy of Thalassery^{6}
- July 26, 1956 Eparchy of Changanassery raised as a Metropolitan Archieparchy with suffragan see of Pala
- January 10, 1957 Eparchy of Kothamangalam^{7}
- March 31, 1962 Ordinariate of Chanda, Maharashtra (CMI)
- July 29, 1968 Ordinariate of Chanda raised as the Exarchate of Chanda
- July 29, 1968 Exarchate of Sagar, Madhya Pradesh (CMI)
- July 29, 1968 Exarchate of Satna, Madhya Pradesh (VC)
- July 29, 1968 Exarchate of Ujjain, Madhya Pradesh (MST)
- March 23, 1972 Exarchate of Bijnor, Uttarakhand (CMI)
- March 23, 1972 Exarchate of Jagdalpur, Chattisgargh (CMI)
- March 1, 1973 Eparchy of Mananthavady^{08}
- June 20, 1974 Eparchy of Palakkad^{09}
- February 26, 1977 Exarchates of Bijnor^{10}, Chanda^{11}, Jagdalpur^{12}, Sagar^{13}, Satna^{14}, and Ujjain^{15} raised as Eparchies.
- February 25, 1977 Eparchy of Rajkot^{16}, Gujarat (CMI)
- February 26, 1977 Eparchy of Kanjirappally^{17}
- June 22, 1978 Eparchy of Irinjalakkuda^{18}
- September 8, 1978 First Apostolic Visitation for the faithful outside proper territory of the Syro-Malabar Church in India until April 23, 1985.
- June 19, 1984 Eparchy of Gorakhpur,^{19} Uttar Pradesh (CST)
- April 28, 1986 Eparchy of Thamarassery^{20}
- April 30, 1988 Eparchy of Kalyan,^{21} Maharashtra
- December 16, 1992 Syro-Malabar Church raised to a Major Archepiscopial Sui iuris Church with the establishment of Major Archiepiscopal see of Ernakulam-Angamaly and appointment of Mar Antony Cardinal Padiyara as the first Major Archbishop.
- May 18, 1995 Eparchies of Thrissur (Suffragan sees of Irinjalakuda and Palakkad) and Thalassery (Suffragan sees of Thamarassery and Mananthavady) made Metropolitan Archieparchies.
- November 11, 1996 Eparchy of Thuckalay,^{22} Tamil Nadu
- February 3, 1998 Major Archiepiscopal Headquarters at Mount St. Thomas, Kakkanad.
- April 24, 1999 Eparchy of Belthangady,^{23} Karnataka
- July 23, 1999 Eparchy of Adilabad,^{24} Andhra Pradesh (CMI)
- July 6, 2001 Eparchy of St. Thomas the Apostle of Chicago,^{25} USA, also acting as Apostolic Visitation in Canada
- December 19, 2002 Eparchy of Idukki^{26}
- May 9, 2005 Eparchy of Kottayam was made a Metropolitan Archieparchy with co-extensive jurisdiction across the Syro-Malabar territory.
- July 15, 2006 Second Apostolic Visitation for the faithful outside proper territory of the Syro-Malabar Church in India
- August 21, 2007 Eparchy of Bhadravathi,^{27} Karnataka (MCBS)
- January 18, 2010 Eparchy of Mandya^{28} Karnataka
- January 18, 2010 Eparchy of Ramanathapuram^{29}, Tamil Nadu
- March 6, 2012 Eparchy of Faridabad^{30}, encompassing the Union Territories of Delhi NCT, Jammu and Kashmir, Ladakh and states of Haryana, Punjab, Himachal Pradesh and parts of Uttar Pradesh.
- December 23, 2013 Eparchy of Saint Thomas the Apostle of Melbourne^{31} established in and for Australia, also acting as Apostolic Visitation for New Zealand
- August 26, 2015 Extension of the territory of the Eparchy of Mandya.
- September 19, 2015 Apostolic Exarchate of Mississauga, Canada
- July 16, 2016 Eparchy of Great Britain^{32}, for England, Scotland and Wales
- July 28, 2016 Apostolic Visitation for the Syro-Malabar Faithful in Europe, headquartered in Rome.
- October 9, 2017 Eparchy of Hosur^{33}, Tamil Nadu
- October 9, 2017 Expansion of territories of Eparchies of Ramanathapuram and Thuckalay.
- October 9, 2017 Eparchy of Shamshabad^{34}, for the rest of the territories in India (23 States and 4 UTs).
- October 9, 2017 Re-establishing of the All India jurisdiction of the Syro-Malabar Church with Pope Francis granting the title of Metropolitan and Gate of All India to Mar George Cardinal Alencherry, the Major Archbishop of the church.
- December 22, 2018 Apostolic Exarchate of Mississauga raised to the Eparchy of Mississauga^{35}, Canada
- July 19, 2020 Headquarters for the Apostolic Visitation for Europe moved to the Basilica of Sant'Anastasia al Palatino, in Rome, after Pope Francis granted the Basilica to the Syro-Malabar Church.
- March 29, 2021 Expansion of territory of the Eparchy of St. Thomas the Apostle of Melbourne to include New Zealand and Oceania
- May 13, 2024 Verbal assent by Pope Francis to the Major Archbishop Mar Raphael Thattil to practice jurisdiction over faithful in the Middle East (Vicariates of Northern Arabia and Southern Arabia).
- August 28, 2025 Territorial expansion of the eparchies of Adilabad, Bhadravati, Bijnor, Chanda, Gorakhpur, Jagdalpur, Kalyan, Rajkot, Sagar, Satna, and Ujjain from the Eparchy of Shamshabad.
- August 28, 2025 Eparchies of Faridabad (Suffragan sees of Bijnor and Gorakhpur), Kalyan (Suffragan sees of Chanda and Rajkot), Shamshabad (Suffragan see of Adilabad), and Ujjain (Suffragan sees of Jagdalpur, Sagar, and Satna) made Metropolitan Archieparchies.
- August 28, 2025 Eparchy of Hosur was made suffragan to the Archeparchy of Thrissur.
- November 18, 2025 Apostolic Visitation for the Syro-Malabar Faithful in the Arabian Peninsula.
