= Sant'Anastasia al Palatino =

Roman Catholic basilica, a landmark of Rome, Italy

Sant'Anastasia
- Basilica of Saint Anastasia on the Palatine Hill (in English); Sanctæ Anastasiæ (in Latin)
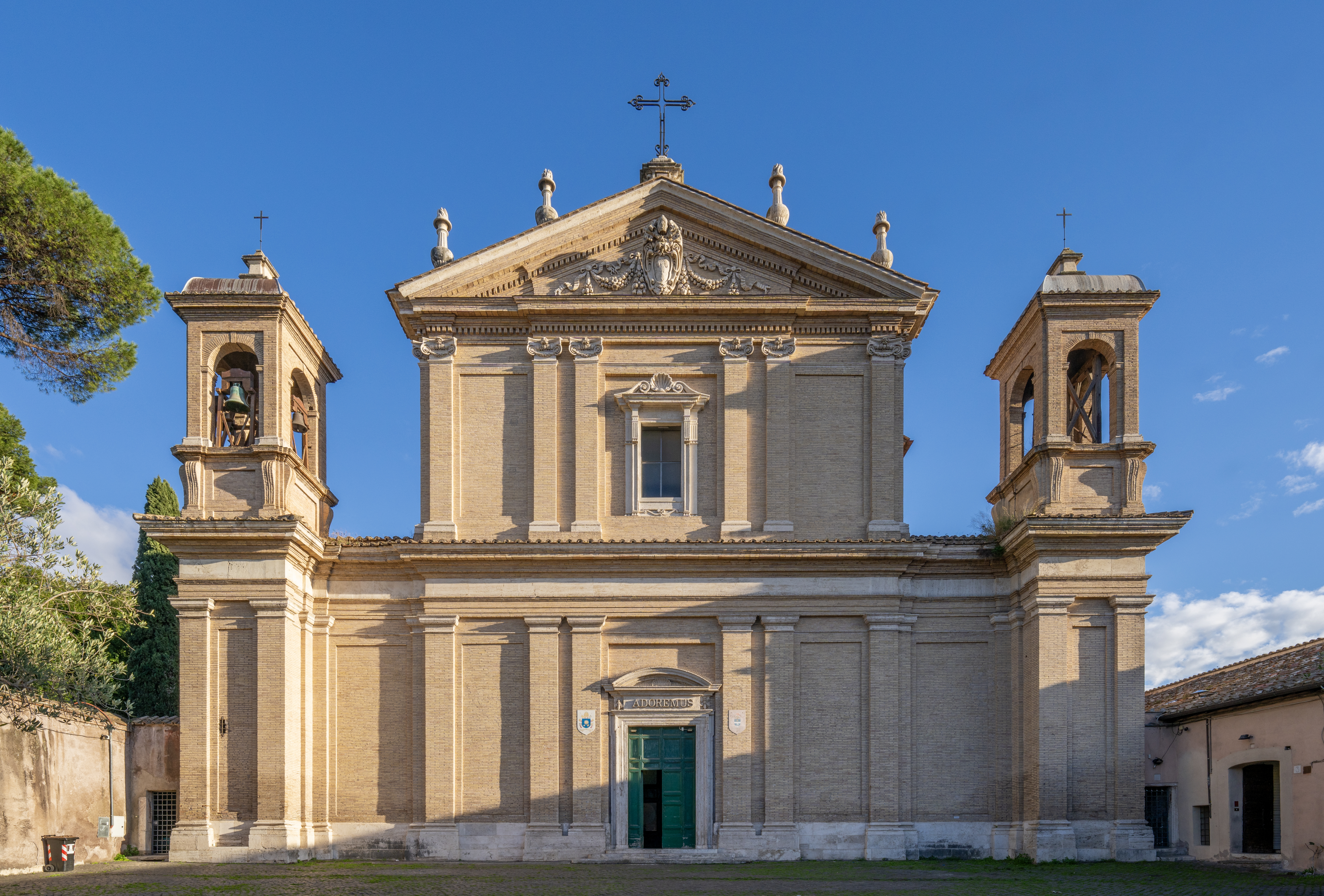
- The front of the basilica di Sant'Anastasia al Palatino
- Click on the map for a fullscreen view
- 41°53′17.05″N 12°29′03.08″E
- Location: Rome
- Country: Italy
- Denomination: Catholic
- Tradition: East Syrian

History
- Status: Titular church, minor basilica, national church
- Dedication: Anastasia of Sirmium
- Consecrated: 330

Architecture
- Architect: Luigi Arrigucci
- Architectural type: Church
- Style: Baroque
- Groundbreaking: 4th century
- Completed: 1656

Administration
- District: Lazio
- Province: Rome

Clergy
- Bishops: Mār Raphael Thattil (Major Archbishop); Mār Stephen Chirappanath (Apostolic Visitator to Europe)

Sant'Anastasia is a minor basilica and titular church for cardinal-priests in Rome, Italy managed by the Syro-Malabar Catholic Church.

== Basilica ==
Sant'Anastasia was built in the late 3rd century - early 4th century, possibly by a Roman woman named Anastasia. The church is listed under the titulus Anastasiae in the acts of the 499 synod. Later the church was entitled to the martyr with the same name, Anastasia of Sirmium. Melchiorri in his 19th century guide of Rome, mentions a Roman matron by the name of Apollonia founded the church.

The church was restored several times: Pope Damasus I (366-383), Pope Hilarius (461-468), Pope John VII (705-707), Pope Leo III (795-816), Pope Gregory IV (827-844), Pope Innocent III (1201), and Pope Sixtus IV (1471). The current church dates to a restoration in 1636 commissioned by Pope Urban VIII from Luigi Arrigucci. This restoration repaired the collapsed portico and facade. Architect Carlo Gimach restored the church between 1721 and 1722. In 1817, under Pope Pius VII, another refurbishment took place.

Traditionally, the basilica was the home parish of St Jerome, who celebrated Mass here. The saint is depicted over the altar, by Domenichino.

Pope Francis granted the church to the Syro Malabar Church in July 2020.

=== Art and architecture ===
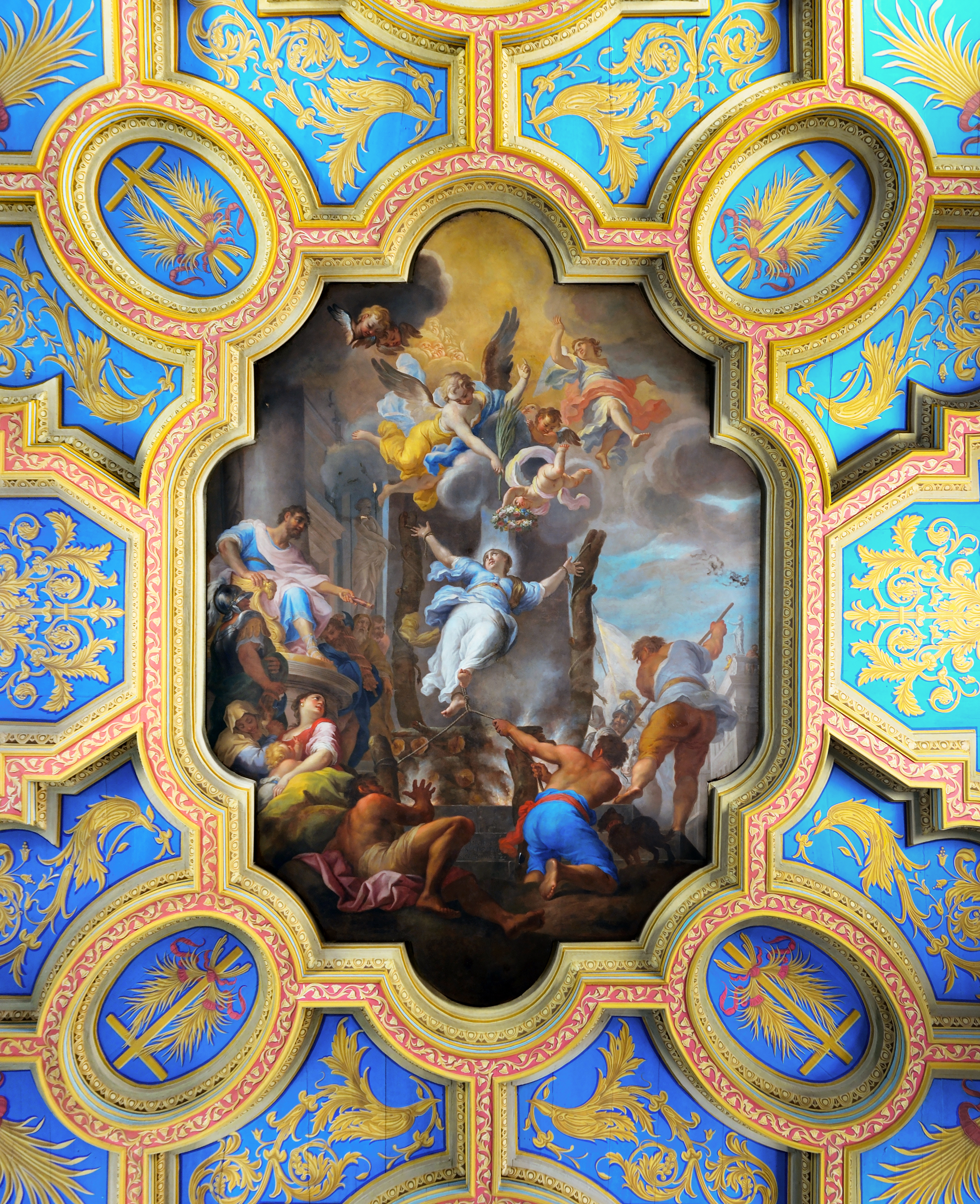
Ceiling with the 1722 fresco (Martyrdom of Anastasia) by Cerruti

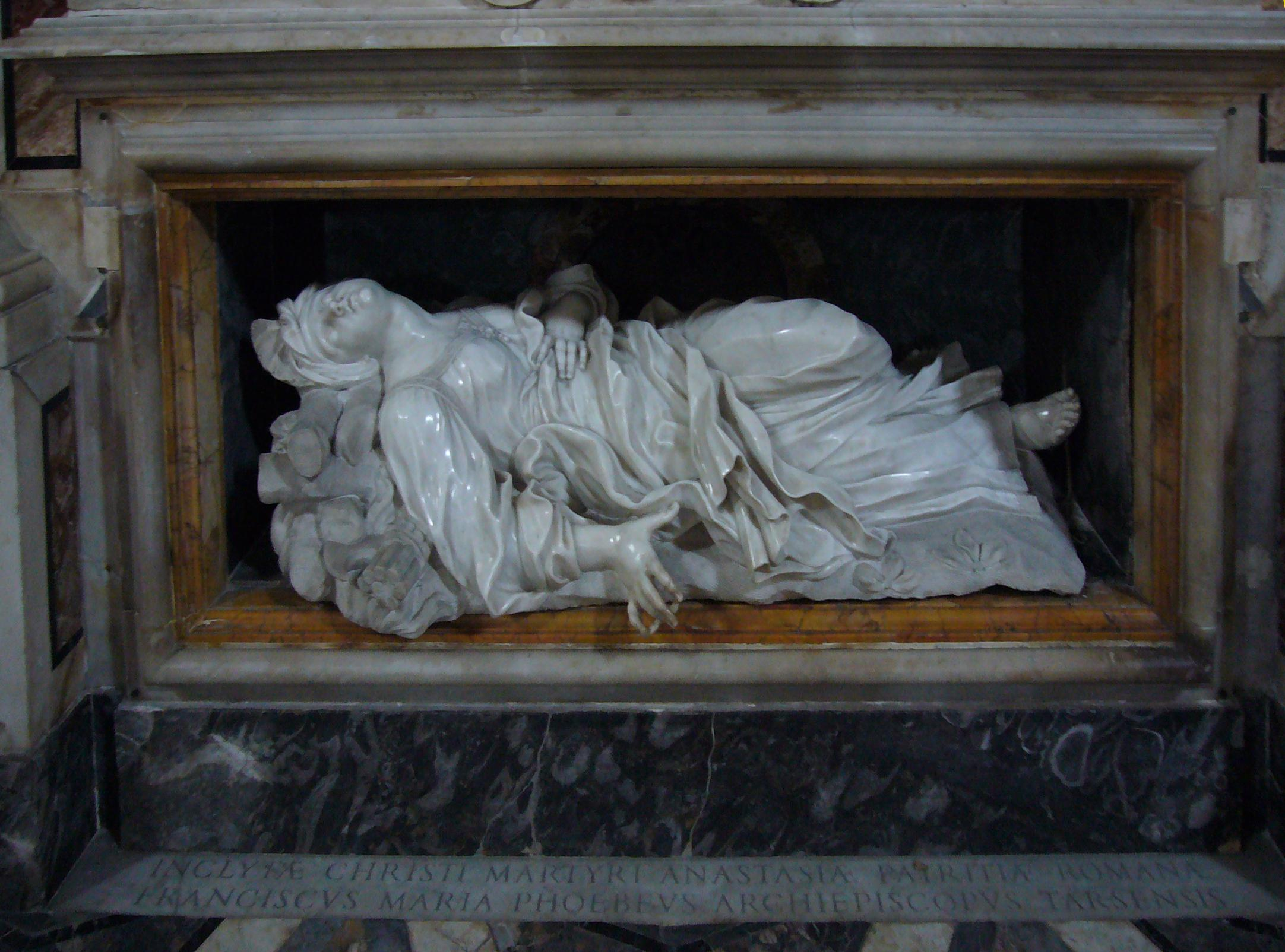
Main altar statue of St Anastasia by Ferrata

The last restoration, after the restoration during the papacy of Sixtus IV, occurred in 1636, when the facade, with lower doric and upper ionic order, was reconstructed in 1636, after the cyclone of 1634. The nave is flanked by pilasters that incorporate Ancient Roman marble and granite columns, putatively from the former Temple of Neptune on the Palatine.

The ceiling is colorfully decorated with elaborate framed designs (cassetone) and has a central frescoed panel depicting the Martyrdom of Anastasia (1722) by Michelangelo Cerruti; the work was pursued under the patronage of the Cardinal Nuno da Cunha e Ataíde. The presbytery was richly decorated in 1705 with marble by the Febei family rebuilt with an endowment of the cardinal Giambattista Costaguti. Under the main altar is said to be sheltered the relics of the titular saint. The main altarpiece behind the altar depicts a Nativity by Lazzaro Baldi. The altar at the base houses a statue of Saint Anastasia by Ercole Ferrata. The recumbent sculpture of the dying saint, laid atop a flaming pyre, was influenced by Bernini's Beata Ludovica Albertoni.

The first chapel to the right, near the entrance, has a painting of St John the Baptist by Pier Francesco Mola. While the last chapel on the right has a fresco depicting Scenes from the lives of Saints Carlo Borromeo and Filippo Neri by Lazzaro Baldi. The right transept has a painting of St Toribio (1726) by Francesco Trevisani. The left transept has a Madonna of the Rosary also by Baldi, and the tomb of Cardinal and philologist Angelo Mai by the late neoclassical sculptor Giovanni Maria Benzoni. The last chapel to the left, is dedicated to St Jerome, and has an altarpiece depicting this saint by Domenichino. The chalice used by the saint was said to be housed in this chapel. The other chapel has a Saints Giorgio and Bishop Publio by Étienne Parrocel.

== Cardinal Priests ==
The current Cardinal Priest of the Titulus S. Anastasiae is Eugenio Dal Corso. Past holders have included Boso, a Bishop of Turin, and John Morton, an Archbishop of Canterbury.

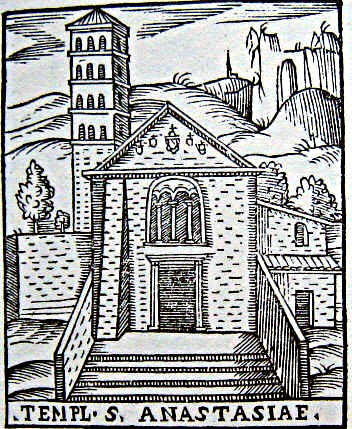
1588 engraving, showing the church before its 17th-century alterations.

- Teobaldo Boccapecci (1122-1126)
- Pierre, (1126-1134)
- Azzone degli Atti, (1134-1139)
- Ribaldo, (1139-1142)
- Ariberto, (1143-1156)
- Giovanni Pizzuti, (1158-1182)
- Bobo, (1188-1189)
- Boson, (1189-1190)
- Romano, (1191-1194)
- Roger, (1206-1213)
- Gregorio Theodoli, (1216-1227)
- Pilfort de Rabastens, Bishop Emeritus of Rieux (1320-1330)
- Adhémar Robert, (20 September 1342-1 December 1352)
- Pierre de Monteruc, Bishop Emeritus of Pamplona (23 December 1356-20 May 1385)
- Pietro Tomacelli, (Pope Boniface IX), Archpriest of St. John Lateran, (1385-1389)
- Enrico Minutoli, Archbishop Emeritus of Naples, (1389-1405)
- Vicente de Ribas, (10 September 1408-10 November 1408)
- Guillaume Ragenel de Montfort, Bishop Emeritus of Saint-Malo (13 June 1432-27 September 1432)
- Giorgio Fieschi, Archbishop Emeritus of Genova (8 January 1440-5 March 1449)
- Jordi d'Ornós (1437–????), schismatic
- Louis de La Palud, Bishop of Saint-Jean-de-Maurienne (20 December 1449-21 September 1451)
- Giacomo Tebaldi, Bishop Emeritus of Montefeltro (24 January 1457-4 September 1466)
- Giovanni Battista Zeno, Bishop of Vicenza (1470-1479)
- Paolo Fregoso, Archbishop of Genova (23 May 1480–1490)
- John Morton, Archbishop of Canterbury (23 September 1493-15 September 1500)
- Antonio Trivulzio, seniore, Bishop of Como (5 October 1500-1 December 1505)
- Robert Guibé, Bishop of Rennes (17 December 1505-9 November 1513)
- Antoine Bohier Du Prat, Archbishop of Bourges (25 May 1517-27 November 1519)
- Lorenzo Campeggi, Bishop of Feltre (1519-1528)
- Antoine Duprat, Archbishop of Sens (27 April 1528-9 July 1535)
- Cristoforo Giacobazzi, Bishop of Cassano all'Jonio (15 January 1537-6 September 1537; 6 September 1537-7 October 1540 in commendam)
- Robert de Lenoncourt, Bishop of Chalons-sur-Marne (7 October 1540-10 October 1547)
- Francesco Sfondrati, Bishop of Capaccio (10 October 1547-31 July 1550)
- Giovanni Angelo Medici (Pope Pius IV), Archbishop of Ragusa (1 September 1550-23 March 1552)
- Giovanni Poggio, Bishop of Tropea (23 March 1552-12 February 1556)
- Giovanni Michele Saraceni, Vice-Chamberlain of the Holy Roman Church (24 March 1557-7 February 1565)
- Scipione Rebiba, Bishop Emeritus of Troia (7 February 1565-7 October 1566)
- Pier Francesco Ferrero, Bishop Emeritus of Vercelli (7 October 1565-14 November 1566)
- Ludovico Simonetta, Datary of His Holiness (15 November 1566-30 April 1568)
- Philibert Babou de La Bourdaisière, Bishop Emeritus of Angoulême (14 May 1568-25 January 1570)
- Antoine Perrenot de Granvella, Archbishop of Mechelen (10 February 1570-9 June 1570)
- Stanislaw Hozjusz, Apostolic Nuncio Emeritus of Hungary (9 June 1570-3 July 1570)
- Girolamo di Corregio, Archbishop of Taranto (3 July 1570-9 October 1572)
- Gianfrancesco Gambara, Bishop of Viterbo (17 October 1572-9 October 1572)
- Alfonso Gesualdo, Archbishop Emeritus of Conza (9 July 1578-17 August 1579)
- Zaccaria Delfino, Bishop Emeritus of Gyôr (7 August 1578-19 December 1583)
- Giovanni Francesco Commendone, Apostolic Nuncio Emeritus to Poland (9 January 1584-14 May 1584)
- Pier Donato Cesi, Bishop Emeritus of Narni (28 May 1584-29 September 1586)
- Ludovico Madruzzo, Bishop of Trento (1 October 1586-20 March 1591)
- Giulio Canani, Bishop of Modena (20 March 1591-27 November 1592)
- Simeone Tagliavia d'Aragonia, Priest (9 December 1592-18 August 1597)
- Bonifazio Bevilacqua Aldobrandini, Bishop of Cervia (17 March 1599-31 August 1611)
- Bernardo de Rojas y Sandoval, Archbishop of Toledo (26 February 1601-7 December 1618)
- Felice Centini, Bishop of Tolentino (3 March 1621-28 November 1633)
- Ulderico Carpegna, Bishop of Gubbio (9 January 1634-21 April 1659)
- Federico Sforza, Camerlengo of the Sacred College of Cardinals (21 April 1659-21 November 1661)
- Carlo Bonelli, Vice-Chamberlain of the Holy Roman Church (15 April 1665-27 August 1676)
- Camillo Massimo, Apostolic Nuncio to Spain (19 October 1676-12 September 1677)
- Girolamo Gastaldi, Archbishop of Benevento (13 September 1677-8 April 1685)
- Federico Baldeschi Colonna, Prefect of Sacred Congregation of Council (9 April 1685-4 October 1691)
- Giambattista Costaguti, Priest (12 November 1691-8 March 1704)
- Giandomenico Paracciani, Prefect of Sacred Congregation for Bishops (25 June 1706-9 May 1721)
- Nuno da Cunha e Ataíde, Bishop of Elvas (16 June 1721-3 December 1750)
- Carlo Maria Sacripante, Priest (1 February 1751-12 January 1756)
- Giacomo Oddi, Bishop of Viterbo (12 January 1756-22 November 1758)
- Carlo Vittorio Amedeo delle Lanze, Priest (22 November 1758-21 March 1763)
- Ludovico Calini, Bishop of Crema (1 December 1766-4 March 1771)
- Muzio Gallo, Bishop of Viterbo (11 April 1785-13 December 1801)
- Ludovico Flangini Giovanelli, Patriarch of Venice (24 May 1802-29 February 1804)
- Ferdinando Maria Saluzzo, Prefect of Sacred Congregation for Good Government (28 May 1804-3 November 1816)
- Francisco Antonio Javier de Gardoqui Arriquíbar, Priest (15 November 1817-27 January 1820)
- Johann Casimir von Häffelin, Priest (19 April 1822-27 August 1827)
- Cesare Nembrini Pironi Gonzaga, Bishop of Ancona e Umana (28 September 1829-5 December 1837)
- Angelo Mai, Prefect of Sacred Congregation of Index (15 February 1838-9 September 1854)
- Karl August Graf von Reisach, Prefect of Sacred Congregation for Studies (20 December 1855-27 September 1861; 27 September 1861-22 June 1868 in commendam)
- Luigi Oreglia di Santo Stefano (16 January 1874 – 24 March 1884)
- Carlo Laurenzi, Auxiliary Bishop of Perugia and Titular Bishop of Amathus in Palaestina (1884–1893)
- Andrea Carlo Ferrari, Archbishop of Milan (1894–1921)
- Michael von Faulhaber, Archbishop of Munich und Freising (1921–1952)
- James Francis McIntyre, Archbishop Emeritus of Los Angeles (1953–1979)
- Godfried Danneels, Archbishop Emeritus of Mechelen-Brussels (1983–2019)
- Eugenio Dal Corso (2019–2024)

Preceded by Sant'Agostino	Landmarks of Rome; Sant'Anastasia al Palatino	Succeeded by Sant'Andrea delle Fratte
