= George Alencherry =

Major Archbishop of the Syro-Malabar Church from 2011 to 2023

Mar George Alencherry
- Major Archbishop Emeritus of the Syro-Malabar Catholic Church; Cardinal-Priest of San Bernardo alle Terme
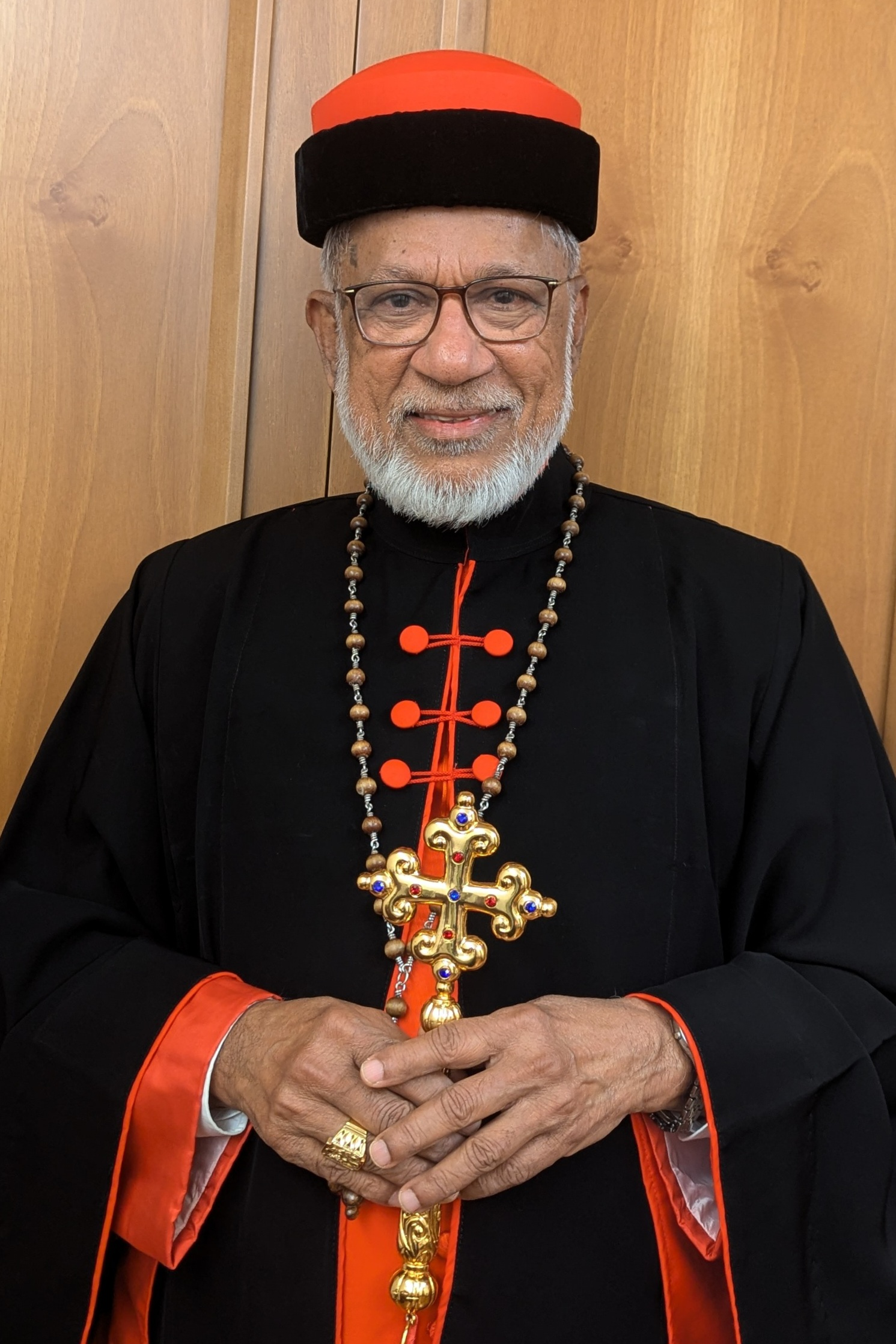
- Alencherry in 2024
- Church: Catholic Church; Syro-Malabar Church
- See: Major Archeparchy of Ernakulam-Angamaly
- Elected: 24 May 2011
- Installed: 29 May 2011
- Term ended: 7 December 2023
- Predecessor: Varkey Vithayathil
- Successor: Raphael Thattil
- Previous post: Bishop of Thuckalay (1997‍–‍2011)

Orders
- Ordination: 18 December 1972 by Antony Padiyara
- Consecration: 2 February 1997 by Joseph Powathil
- Created cardinal: 18 February 2012 by Pope Benedict XVI
- Rank: Major archbishop; Cardinal priest

Personal details
- Born: 19 April 1945 (age 81) Thuruthy, Travancore, British India

Ordination history
History
Priestly ordination
- Ordained by: Antony Padiyara
Episcopal consecration
- Principal consecrator: Joseph Powathil
- Co-consecrators: Lawrence Ephraem Thottam, Mathew Vattackuzhy
Episcopal succession
Bishops consecrated by George Alencherry as principal consecrator
- Kuriakose Bharanikulangara: 2012
- George Rajendran Kuttinadar: 2012
- George Madathikandathil: 2013
- Joseph Kollamparampil: 2013
- Jose Puthenveettil: 2013
- John Alappat: 2014
- Ephrem Nariculam: 2014
- Joseph Kodakallil: 2015
- Jose Kalluvelil: 2015
- Antony Prince Panengaden: 2015
- Joseph Srampickal: 2016
- Stephen Chirappanath: 2016
- Sebastian Vaniyapurackal: 2017
- Sebastian Pozholiparampil: 2017
- John Nellikunnel: 2018
- James Athikalam: 2018
- Vincent Nellaiparambil: 2019
- Joseph Kollamparambil: 2022
- Thomas Padiyath: 2022
- John Panamthottathil: 2023
- Mathew Nellikunnel: 2023

George Alencherry (Syriac: ܓܹܝܘܲܪܓܝܼܣ ܐܵܠܲܢܫܹ̰ܝܪܝ, romanized: Gīwargīs Ālancēri; born 19 April 1945) is a cardinal and a former major archbishop of the Syro-Malabar Catholic Church after serving in the position from 2011 to 2023.

He was elected by the Holy Synod of the Syro-Malabar Church in 2011 to succeed Varkey Vithayathil (1999–2011). He was created a cardinal on 18 February 2012 by Pope Benedict XVI. He was the first bishop of Thuckalay from 1997 to 2011 before his enthronement as the major archbishop.

== Early life and career ==
George Alencherry was born on 19 April 1945, the sixth of ten children born to Mary and Philipose Alencherry, in Thuruthy. (Note: Two of his brothers are priests and one sister is a nun.) Geevarghese is his baptismal name. (Note: Geevarghese is a Syriac–Malayalam variant of George.) Alencherry attended primary school at St Mary's School in Thuruthy and then St. Berchman's High School in Changanacherry. In 1961 he entered the archdiocesan minor seminary at Parel, Changanacherry. While he studied there, he obtained his bachelor's degree in economics from St. Berchmans College in Changanacherry. He completed his philosophy and theology studies at St. Joseph's Pontifical Seminary in Aluva.

On 18 December 1972, Antony Padiyara, archbishop of Chanagancherry, ordained him a priest at St. Mary's Church in Thuruthy for the archdiocese of Changanacherry. He continued his studies at the Pontifical Institute of Theology and Philosophy, earning a master's degree in the first rank. While Alencherry was studying in Aluva, he served as vicar of the filial church at Periyarmugham in the Archeparchy of Ernakulam-Angamaly. After completing his studies at Aluva, Alencherry was appointed assistant vicar at the cathedral church of Changanacherry and Director of the Archdiocesan Faith Formation department. Thereafter, he served three years as secretary of the Commission for Catechism of the Kerala Catholic Bishops' Council (KCBC). He then studied in Paris at Sorbonne University and the Catholic Institute, where he obtained a doctorate in biblical theology. Returning to India in 1986, Alencherry was appointed director of the Pastoral Oriental Centre (POC) at Palarivattom and deputy secretary of KCBC, serving until 1993. During these years he was also a professor at St. Thomas Apostolic Seminary in Vadavathoor, where he continued until 1997. From 1994 to 1996 he was the protosyncellus, roughly the equivalent of vicar general in the Latin church, of the archeparchy of Changanacherry.

== Ecclesial service ==
=== Bishop of Thuckalay ===
Pope John Paul II erected the Diocese of Thuckalay by the papal bull Apud Indorum on 11 November 1996. It was formed by separating the territory of the Archdiocese of Changanassery that included parts of the state of Tamil Nadu. Alencherry was appointed bishop of the new eparchy. The establishment of the diocese and Alencherry's appointment were promulgated on 18 December 1996. Alencherry was consecrated a bishop on 2 February 1997 by Joseph Powathil, Metropolitan Archbishop of Changanassery, with Mathew Vattackuzhy, Bishop of Kanjirappally, and Lawrence Aprem, Bishop of Marthandam, as co-consecrators. He was installed as bishop on the same day by Varkey Vithayathil, Major Archbishop of the Syro-Malabar Church.

=== Major Archbishop ===
Archbishop Salvatore Pennacchio, the Apostolic Nuncio to India, presents a gift to Alencherry during his installation as major archbishop.

In May 2011, the bishops' synod of the Syro-Malabar Catholic Church elected Alencherry to succeed Varkey Vithayathil as Major Archbishop of Ernakulam-Angamaly and head of the Syro-Malabar Church. (Note: The synod opened on 23 May, elected Alencherry, and received his assent. The request for papal approval was sent through the Apostolic Nunciature to India in New Delhi. Approval was granted on the evening of 25 May and announced to the synod on the morning of 26 May.) His election received papal approval and was announced simultaneously in Rome and at the synod on 26 May. He was the first head of the Syro-Malabar Church to be elected by its synod. (Note: When Pope John Paul II raised the Syro-Malabar Church to the status of a Major Archiepiscopal Church in 1992, he reserved to himself the authority to appoint its bishops. Only in 2004 did the Holy See grant full administrative powers to the church, including the authority to elect its bishops.) Alencherry declared his service would be for all the people of India, stressing ecumenical relations among Christians and harmony with other religions.

On 18 February 2012, Pope Benedict XVI elevated Alencherry to the rank of cardinal during a ceremony in Saint Peter's Basilica, creating him Cardinal-Priest of San Bernardo alle Terme. (Note: Earlier cardinals belonging to the Syro-Malabar Catholic Church were Joseph Parecattil (28 April 1969), Antony Padiyara (28 June 1988) and Varkey Vithayathil (21 February 2001).)

Alencherry's visit to Rome for that consistory coincided with the arrest of Italian merchant marine officers on board the Enrica Lexie who shot and killed two Kerala fishermen on a fishing vessel. Alencherry provided a statement to the Italian news service Agenzia Fides that "This episode must be investigated: if there is a guilty action, it must be treated legally and the guilty must be punished. We must fully respect truth and justice." He denied any interest in serving as a mediator. He had previously been quoted accusing some Kerala politicians of exploiting the incident for their own purposes and seemed to suggest he was actively seeking to resolve the dispute. Upon his return to India, he expressed unreserved sympathy for the families of the dead fishermen and ascribed any other misunderstandings to misquotes by Fides.

On 24 April 2012, Alencherry was made a member of the Congregation for the Doctrine of the Faith and of the Congregation for the Oriental Catholic Churches.

Alencherry participated as a cardinal-elector in the 2013 conclave that elected Pope Francis. During the conclave, Alencherry was one of the four cardinal-electors from outside the Latin Church who wore different vestments, proper to their respective churches. (Note: The others were Coptic Catholic Patriarch-Emeritus Antonios Naguib, Maronite Patriarch Bechara Boutros al-Rahi, and Syro-Malankara Major Archbishop Baselios Cleemis.)

Following a series of attacks on Catholic properties, on 17 February 2015 Indian Prime Minister Narendra Modi, speaking at a ceremony celebrating two new Indian saints, expressed strong support for "equal respect for all religions" and denounced sectarian violence, but Alencherry warned that proposed anti-conversion legislation contradicted that rhetoric.

He underwent angioplasty on 8 December 2017.

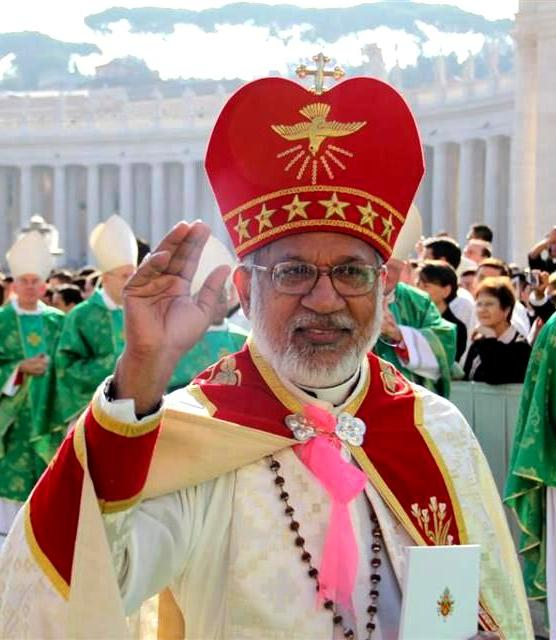

An internal investigation by the Archdiocese of Ernakulam-Angamaly determined it had suffered large losses on speculative real estate deals made by Alencherry without adhering to procedural safeguards. The archeparchy's priests' council called on the pope to take action against Alencherry and in February 2018, the Synod of the Syro-Malabar Church, apparently with Alencherry in agreement, withdrew Alencherry's authority over the archeparchy's administrative and economic affairs. It allowed him to continue to exercise his pastoral and liturgical roles. From that time until his resignation, responsibility for the archeparchy's financial affairs passed to a series of prelates named by the Synod or Pope Francis. (Note: The Synod first assigned responsibility to auxiliary bishop Sebastian Adayanthrath. On 22 June 2018, Pope Francis appointed the Bishop of Palgath, Jacob Manathodath, as apostolic administrator, terminating that appointment on 27 June 2019. In August 2019, the Synod in turn named Antony Kariyil, Bishop of Mandya, as vicar to assist Alencherry. Upon Kariyil's retirement on 30 July 2022, Pope Francis again appointed an apostolic administrator, the Archbishop of Trichur, Andrews Thazhath. Thazhath's role ended with Alencherry's resignation as major archbishop.)

In December 2019 Alencherry was elected head of the Kerala Catholic Bishops Council, a state-wide organization of Catholic bishops. This move subsequently met with criticism from a section of believers in the Church owing to accusations of corruption against him in a land deal case from 2016. As president of the Kerala Catholic Bishop's Conference, he made all Catholic hospitals open and available for the treatment of COVID-19 patients.

In December 2019 Alencherry called upon the Union government to reconsider the Citizenship (Amendment) Act, 2019, saying the act lacked clarity in many areas. He said "The problems should not become communal. There should be no conflict between religions or between states." and said that he hoped the government would introduce a mitigated version of the same act. Alencherry received a pamphlet distributed by the Bharatiya Janata Party (BJP) supporting the CAA in January 2020.

In January 2021 Cardinal Alencherry along with Cardinals Baselios Cleemis and Oswald Gracias, were received by Prime Minister Narendra Modi and conveyed the grievances of the Christian community.

He announced his resignation as the major archbishop of the Syro-Malabar Catholic Church on 7 December 2023. Pope Francis' letter accepting his resignation, dated 29 November, was made public the same day.

== Views ==
=== Extending the jurisdiction of the Syro-Malabar Church ===
In 2011, Alencherry called for the erection of "a territorial jurisdiction covering the whole territory of India" so the Syro-Malabar Church could serve its growing communities in India's largest cities. He called it "one of our appeals to the Holy Father" and presented an argument based on colonialist usurpation of ancient rights. He said:

We believe it is our right. Before the arrival of Western missionaries – the Portuguese arrived in the sixteenth century – the jurisdiction of us 'Catholic Christians among St Thomas' was extended to all of India. Then the Western missionaries, because of the influence of European monarchs, took jurisdiction of India, restricting ours to the areas where we were more concentrated.

Pope Francis responded in October 2017 with the creation of the Eparchy of Shamshabad to encompass all the areas of India not otherwise included within the jurisdiction of an existing eparchy. The new eparchy's inauguration in 2018 was greeted as "a historic victory" and in December 2020 it was made a suffragan of Alencherry's archeparchy.

=== Christian unity and Petrine ministry ===
The Catholic Church through the Council for Christian Unity, has already begun a dialogue on the primacy. I think we should continue the dialogue and seek a common agreement with the Eastern Churches, as there was in the first four centuries of Christianity. At that time there was a common understanding of the primacy. Now the Orthodox Church argues that it is impossible to go back to theology before the Council of Chalcedon because we do not possess any documents from that era. But I think that from the documents and statements subsequent to the time of Chalcedon there would be the possibility of dialogue and agreement on the Petrine ministry. Because there is the phrase primus inter pares. We all need a Petrine ministry of unity, which is a reference for all the Churches. I hope that a halfway point is found where the Catholic Church and the Orthodox Churches could come together in full communion with the Church of Christ.

— George Alencherry, 2011

== Controversies ==
=== Liturgy unification and Latinisation dispute ===
==== Historical overview ====
The Syro-Malabar liturgy was in a heavily Latinised state following the Synod of Diamper in 1599. Archdiocese of Angamaly, the ancient metropolitan see of the Syro-Malabar Church, was degraded as a suffragan diocese of the Padroado Latin Catholic Archdiocese of Goa, and its all India jurisdiction was abolished. Although Syriac was retained as the sacred language, the liturgical books were modified to closely resemble the Roman Rite. For over three centuries, the Malabar Catholics were administered by Latin hierarchy. The cultural hegemony was generally supported by the papacy and the propaganda congregation.

From 1934 onwards, popes encouraged a process of returning to the original liturgical traditions, which resulted in divergence of opinion among Syro-Malabar Catholics. Following the Second Vatican Council, the Archdiocese of Ernakulam–under the leadership of Joseph Parecattil–and its ecclesiastical province changed, as in the universal Church, to a rubric in the celebration of the Mass versus populum. The Archdiocese advocated for a unified, Indianised (including the adoption of selected Indian customs for the Syro-Malabar Church. This move was opposed by the Congregation for the Oriental Churches and the Archdiocese of Changanacherry. This created liturgical and ideological disunity within the Syro-Malabar Church.

In 1992, the Syro-Malabar Catholic Church was elevated to the status of a major archiepiscopal church with Ernakulam as the primatal see. In 1999, the Synod of the Syro-Malabar Church led by its then-Major Archbishop Varkey Vithayathil, drew up a formula of rubric (50:50) by incorporating the views of both factions. The new pattern of Mass celebration came to be known as the Synodal Form with pre-Anaphoral and post-Anaphoral part in versus populum and the Anaphora celebrated ad orientem. However the formula was rejected by the priests and laities of some dioceses, starting from that of Jacob Thoomkuzhy. Major Archbishop Varkey Vithayathil himself was forced to sign dispensation in his archdiocese, Ernakulam-Angamaly.

==== Attempts by Alencherry ====
Alencherry, from the date of his installation, emphasised the need for the rubrical uniformity in the celebration of the Mass and expressed that it was his most important task. However, his attempts were met with protests from the diocesan priests and laity of the Archdiocese of Ernakulam-Angamaly. Meanwhile, George Alencherry was successful in persuading the Synod of the Syro-Malabar Church to legislate on rubrical uniformity (as known as the 50:50 formula) and in bringing more dioceses into the implementation of the decision made in 1999. The Synod in 2020 approved the revised form of the liturgy, and it was confirmed in 2021, both by the pope and the Synod. Meanwhile, protests erupted in the Archdiocese of Ernakulam-Angamaly led by a number of priests and laities. This was followed by the land scam allegation, which led to the installation of Antony Kariyil as the metropolitan vicar of the major archbishop. The metropolitan vicar, being responsible for the ordinary administration of the archdiocese, met the pope in November 2021 and issued an order of dispensation from the decision made by the synod on the question of the rubric versus the people, in the guise of having papal assent. Initially, some other dioceses also followed the same path but later revoked the dispensation, following explicit rebuke from the Holy See. Antony Kariyil was later forced to resign, but the major section of the priests of Ernakulam-Angamaly continues their dissent, thus in effect maintaining the rubric versus populum in the celebration of the Mass, albeit illicitly.

=== Land deal Controversy and Ernakulam priests' revolt ===
In March the city police initiated an investigation into the real estate transactions after a private citizen, a lay Catholic, lodged a complaint against Alencherry, two priests, and a real estate agent. The Kerala High Court observed that there was prima facie evidence to indicate criminal conspiracy, breach of trust and misappropriation of money. (Note: The others accused were two senior archdiocesan officials, Father Joshy Puthuva and Father Sebastian Vadakkumpadan, and Kochi-based real estate agent Saju Varghese.) A single bench judge of Kerala High Court found the complainant had standing to bring the lawsuit because the property at issue was not private property, but assets held in trust with Alencherry as caretaker. On 16 March 2018, the division bench of Kerala High Court stayed a court order requiring the police investigation because the complainant had sought the order without first allowing the police (Note: The police are referred to locally as the SHO or station house officer.) to follow their procedures and removed some verbal comments of the single judge abusing ecclesiastical powers of the head of the church. Later that month, a group of 90 priests out of 400 staged a street demonstration calling on Alencherry to stand aside, pending resolution of the legal procedure, while more than 200 lay Catholics responded with a demonstration in support of Alencherry. The Vatican's proper role and its failure to intervene were decried and defended as well.

On 22 June 2018, Pope Francis named Jacob Manathodath, Bishop of Palghat the Apostolic Administrator seda plena of the Archieparchy of Ernakulam-Angamaly under the recommendation of Alencherry.

In April 2019, the Kakkanad Judicial First Class Magistrate Court filed a criminal complaint against Alencherry for breaches of the law and massive disparities in the church's land agreements. The Ernakulam Principal Sessions Court ruled on 24 August 2019 that Alencherry, along with the former financial officer of the archdiocese and a real estate agent will face charges. The Joseph Injodey commission, which was created by apostolic administrator Bishop Jacob Manathodath to investigate the property dealings, submitted its findings in March 2019 to Bishop Manathodath, who would forward it to Cardinal Sandri, prefect of the Congregation for Oriental Churches in Rome. The Income Tax Department fined the Syro-Malabar Church's archbishop of Ernakulam-Angamaly Rs 3 crore for the contentious land purchases that occurred between April 2013 and March 2018. During the investigation, the department discovered that there were attempts to avoid tax in the land sale, and the plots were registered for lower amounts while the sale was done for greater amounts. Bishop Antony Kariyil of Mandya was then appointed as the episcopal vicar of the major archbishop and given the personal title "archbishop". Alencherry returned to the helm of the Ernakulam-Angamaly Archdiocese on 27 June 2019, after the Vatican terminated the appointment of apostolic administrator.

The land deal row was investigated by KPMG, a private audit firm appointed by the Vatican. The 2019 KPMG report revealed that an inquiry has found a lack of transparency in the appointment of agents in the land deals. Laity activists sought civil and legal action on the matter and action against George Alencherry who was the diocese head. The police team investigating the case submitted a report to the Chief Judicial Magistrate Court in Ernakulam in December 2020, stating that there is no evidence of conspiracy or excessive gain by George Alencherry in the incident.

The High Court of Kerala denied Alencherry's plea in August 2021, which sought to dismiss the cases filed against him for alleged criminal breach of trust, criminal conspiracy, and fraudulent execution of settlement documents in the lawsuit challenging the lower court's verdict. The Kerala High Court ruled in August 2021 that George Alencherry must stand trial in the case. The court found that a significant information had been suppressed, and directed the government to investigate whether any state land had been included in the sale. It had also criticized the police for not registering a case despite being in possession of enough information. In September 2021, the Kerala government has formed a seven-member enquiry team to probe the cases related to the land deals.

==== Forged documents by priests ====
A 24-year-old man was arrested on 19 May 2019 for allegedly forging documents against Alencherry, following which a row has erupted in the Syro-Malabar Church with a section of priests protesting against the arrest. Three bishops of the Ernakulam-Angamaly Archdiocese have come out openly against the arrest of the man, claiming that he is not a criminal and he had no role in forging documents. The priests have claimed that the man, a faithful, while working as an intern with a reputed business group in Kochi, had taken a screenshot of documents allegedly having Alencherry's name from the computer server of the firm and brought it to the notice of a church priest Tony Kalookaran. The priest reportedly shared it with another priest, who allegedly submitted it to a Synod of the Syro-Malabar Catholic Church. The priests, including auxiliary bishops of the Ernakulam-Angamaly Archdiocese, have demanded a high-level probe into the forgery case. Police have said the documents, purportedly linking the Syro-Malabar Church head with the accounts of a private bank, were found to be forged during their investigation. According to them, the cardinal was found not operating any account in the bank named in the documents. The priests, including Bishop Jacob Manathodath, who was appointed as the administrator of the Ernakulam-Angamaly Archdiocese by Pope Francis on 22 June 2018, have urged the government to order either a CBI or a judicial probe into the case. Meanwhile, the police made Kallookaran also an accused in the case on 21 May 2019. Former Auxiliary Bishops Sebastian Adayanthrath and Jose Puthenveettil had also joined Bishop Manathodath at a press conference held on 20 May 2019 to raise the demand. Refuting the allegations of torture in custody, the police said they were carrying out a "scientific probe" into the case.

=== Love jihad controversy ===
In January 2020, a post-synodal circular issued by Alencherry about love jihad was read out at Catholic churches on Sunday liturgies, the circular alleged that Christian women are targeted, recruited to Islamic state and even killed. However, the circular was not read in many of the churches in Ernakulam district due to ongoing disputes with hierarchy. The church's statement sparked criticism from its leaders and followers. Reformists criticized the church for labeling interfaith weddings as "love jihad." Many clergy directly challenged the legitimacy of the statements. Reformist groups such as the Archdiocesan Movement for Transparency, the Council Against Religious Exploitation and the Joint Christian Council criticized the church, claiming that such remarks were meant to divert attention away from the corruption charges of the church's leaders.

== Notes ==
Catholic Church titles
First Diocese erected	Bishop of Thuckalay; 11 November 1996 – 24 May 2011	Succeeded by George Rajendran Kuttinadar
Preceded by Varkey Vithayathil	Major Archbishop of Ernakulam-Angamaly; 24 May 2011 – 7 December 2023	Succeeded by Raphael Thattil
Preceded by Varkey Vithayathil	President of the Synod of the Syro-Malabar Church; 25 May 2011 – 7 December 2023	Succeeded by Raphael Thattil
Preceded by Varkey Vithayathil	Cardinal-Priest of San Bernardo alle Terme; 18 February 2012 –	Incumbent
