= Mibiarca =

Africa Proconsularis (125 AD)

The diocese of Mibiarca (in Latin: Dioecesis Mibiarcensis) is a suppressed and titular see of the Catholic Church, in today's Tunisia. It is an ancient episcopal seat of the Late Roman province of Byzacena.

The only known bishop of this African diocese was John, who participated in the anti-monotheistic council of Carthage (641).

Today Mibiarca survives as a titular diocese established in 1933. Its initial bishop was Marcelo Gérin y Boulay, the Prelate of Choluteca in Honduras, who was appointed in 1966. The current titular bishop is Thomas Padiyath, who was appointed in 2022 and who is an auxiliary bishop of the Syro-Malabar Eparchy of Shamshabad in India.

List of Catholic titular bishops of Mibiarca
Name	Sui iuris church	Appointed	Concomitant appointment	Term end	Notes
Marcelo Gérin y Boulay	Latin Church	30 Dec 1966	Prelate of Choluteca, Honduras	29 Aug 1979	Appointed, Bishop of Choluteca
Emilio Ogñénovich	Latin Church	1 Oct 1979	Auxiliary Bishop of Bahía Blanca, Argentina	8 Jun 1982	Appointed, Bishop of Mercedes, Argentina
José Oscar Barahona Castillo	Latin Church	16 Jul 1982	Auxiliary Bishop of San Vicente, El Salvador	6 Jun 1983	Appointed, Bishop of San Vicente
Luis Morgan (Aloysius) Casey	Latin Church	3 Nov 1983	Auxiliary Bishop of La Paz, Bolivia	27 Jul 2022	Died in office as Vicar Apostolic Emeritus of Pando, Bolivia
Thomas Padiyath	Syro-Malabar Church	25 Aug 2022	Auxiliary Bishop of Shamshabad, India	present	incumbent
