= James Patteril =

Syro-Malabar Catholic Bishop

Mar James Patteril CMF
- Bishop of Belthangady
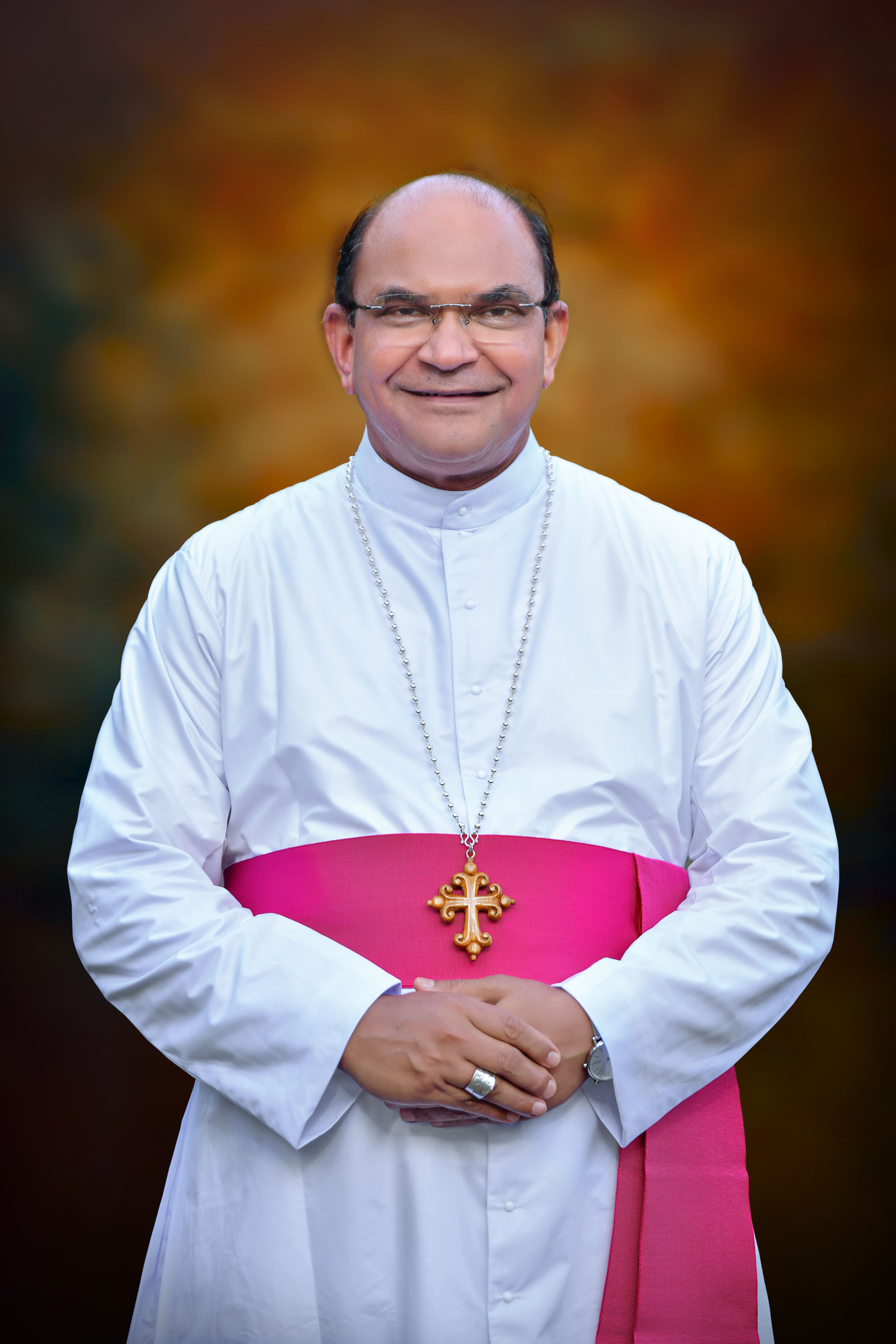
- Church: Syro-Malabar Church
- Diocese: Eparchy of Belthangady
- Appointed: August 28, 2025
- Installed: 5 November 2025
- Predecessor: Mar Lawrence Mukkuzhy
- Previous posts: Provincial bursar (Würzburg); Mission Procurator; Provincial Econome and Consultor (Claretians)

Orders
- Ordination: April 26, 1990
- Consecration: 5 November 2025 by Mar Raphael Thattil

Personal details
- Born: July 27, 1962 (age 64) Mangalore, Karnataka, India
- Education: St. Peter’s Pontifical Institute, Bangalore; Christ University, Bangalore; Pastoraltheologisches Institut, Friedberg

Mar James Patteril is an Indian bishop of the Syro-Malabar Church and a member of the Congregation of the Missionary Sons of the Immaculate Heart of Mary. On 28 August 2025, the Synod of Bishops of the Syro-Malabar Major Archiepiscopal Church, with prior assent from Pope Leo XIV, elected him Bishop of the Eparchy of Belthangady in Karnataka, India, succeeding Mar Lawrence Mukkuzhy.

== Early life and formation ==
Patteril was born in Mangalore, Karnataka, to Abraham and Rosamma Patteril. He entered the Claretian congregation in 1982 and professed perpetual vows on 12 June 1988. He completed studies in philosophy and theology at St. Peter’s Pontifical Institute in Bangalore and was ordained a priest on 26 April 1990 at St. Sebastian’s Church, Kalenja. He also earned a B.A. from Christ University, Bangalore, and pursued pastoral-theology studies at the Pastoraltheologisches Institut of the Pallottine Fathers in Friedberg, Germany.

== Priesthood ==
Following ordination, Patteril transitioned to various pastoral and administrative assignments, both in India and Germany, including:

- Hospital chaplain in Flörsheim (1997–2004) and economist of the Claretiner-Seminar, Frankfurt (1998–2004).Hospital chaplain in Flörsheim (1997–2004) and economist of the Claretiner-Seminar, Frankfurt (1998–2004).
- Hospital chaplain in Flörsheim (1997–2004) and economist of the Claretiner-Seminar, Frankfurt (1998–2004).
- Provincial Econome and Consultor (from 2004); Superior of Würzburg House (2005–2008; 2010–2011); Mission Procurator (from 2008).
- Before his election as bishop-elect, Patteril served as provincial bursar in Würzburg, where he was responsible for Syro-Malabar pastoral care.

== Episcopacy ==
On 28 August 2025, after the Synod of Bishops of the Syro-Malabar Major Archiepiscopal Church accepted the resignation of founding Bishop Mar Lawrence Mukkuzhy, Patteril transitioned from his previous roles to become Bishop of Belthangady, with the prior assent of the Holy Father. His episcopal consecration and enthronement will be scheduled following the announcement of the election.

== The Eparchy of Belthangady ==
The Syro-Malabar Catholic Eparchy of Belthangady was erected on 24 April 1999 by Pope John Paul II and inaugurated on 4 August 1999. As of 2025, it serves roughly 30,000 faithful (4,750 families) across 55 parishes and 8 forane churches within an area of 12,543 km²; principal languages include Kannada, Tulu, Konkani, Malayalam, English, and Coorgi.

== See also ==
- Syro-Malabar Catholic Eparchy of Belthangady
- Syro-Malabar Catholic Church
- Claretians
