= Joseph Kollamparambil =

Mar Joseph Kollamparambil
- Auxiliary bishop and Protosyncellus of the Archeparchy of Shamshabad
- Church: Syro-Malabar Catholic Church
- Archdiocese: Archeparchy of Shamshabad
- Appointed: 25 August 2022

Orders
- Ordination: 18 December 1981 by Joseph Powathil
- Consecration: 9 October 2022 by George Alencherry, Joseph Perumthottam, and Raphael Thattil

Personal details
- Born: 22 September 1955 (age 71) Pala, Kerala

Mar Joseph Kollamparambil (born 22 September 1955) is an Indian bishop of the Syro-Malabar Catholic Church in the India. He is currently the senior auxiliary bishop and protosyncellus of Syro-Malabar Catholic Archeparchy of Shamshabad.

== Biography ==
=== Early life and studies ===
Kollamparambil was born on 22 September 1955 in Pala, Kerala. He began his priestly formation at Paurastya Vidyapitham in Vadavathoor and then Good Shepherd Major Seminary in Kunnoth. He was then ordained to the ministry to 18 December 1981. After his ordination, he continued his studies gaining a Master of Arts degree from St. Thomas College and then a Doctorate in political science from Mahatma Gandhi University

=== Ministry ===
Mar Joseph served in the Palai Pastoral Institute as its director. He then went back to his former alma mater St. Thomas College to serve as a professor before serving as Christ Raj Hostel and St. Thomas College of Teacher Education's Director. In 2003, He was appointed by Joseph Kallarangatt as the Dean of St. George College, Aruvithura and served in that role till 2011. He served as an Eparchial Consultor alongside that role.

=== Serving in the Curia ===
After his term as the Aruvithura College Dean ended, He served as Eparchial Consultor and member of the Council for Economic Affairs, before being appointed by Bishop Kallarangatt as the Syncellus of the Eparchy. In 2019, He was invited by Raphael Thattil to serve as the Vicar general of the newly erected Eparchy of Shamshabad.

=== Auxiliary Of Shamshabad ===
On 25 August 2022, Pope Francis announced and approved of the election of Kollamparambil as one of the two auxiliary bishops for Shamshabad along with Thomas Padiyath by the Syro-Malabar Catholic Church Synod. He was consecrated on 9 October 2022, by Cardinal George Alencherry.
