= Jose Kalluvelil =

Syro-Malabar Catholic bishop

Mar Jose Kalluvelil
- Bishop of Syro-Malabar Catholic Eparchy of Mississauga
- Church: Syro-Malabar Catholic Church
- Diocese: Syro-Malabar Catholic Eparchy of Mississauga
- Appointed: August 6, 2015
- Installed: September 19, 2015
- Predecessor: First Eparch
- Previous posts: Leader of Toronto and Mississauga Syro Malabar Mission

Orders
- Ordination: December 18, 1984
- Consecration: September 19, 2015 by George Cardinal Alencherry, Joseph Pallikaparampil, and Jacob Angadiath

Personal details
- Born: November 15, 1955 (age 70) Ernakulam, Kerala
- Motto: For the Glory of God

Mar Jose Kalluvelil (born November 15, 1955) is an Indian prelate of the Catholic Church; he was serving as the first bishop of the Syro-Malabar Catholic Eparchy of Mississauga.

Jose Kalluvelil was born on November 15, 1955, at Thottuva, Kuravilangad, in the Eparchy of Pala, India as the youngest son of Joseph and Annamma. He has four brothers. At the age of four, the family moved to Jellipara, in the Eparchy of Palghat, India. After completing High School studies, he joined St. Mary's Minor Seminary, Thrissur. Major Seminary formation was at St. Thomas Apostolic Seminary, Kottayam, India where he received his Bachelor's Degree in Philosophy and Theology. He was ordained priest on December 18, 1984, by Mar Joseph Irimpen, the first Bishop of Palghat. Kalluvelil began his priestly ministry on January 15, 1985, at Fathima Matha Church as Asst. Parish Priest and Director of St. Joseph's Boys Home at Agali. In 1989 he was appointed Director of Catechetical Department in the Eparchy of Palghat, where he served for 12 consecutive years. During this period he was also the Parish Priest at the parishes of Panthalampadam, Olavakod and Ottapalam. In addition, he served the Eparchy as Diocesan Consultor, Founder Director of Kerala Catholic Students League, Director of Holy Childhood and Bible Apostolate. In 2001, Fr. Jose was sent to Rome for higher studies. He completed his licentiate in "Theology of Human Mobility" from Pontifical Urban University and Doctorate in "Family Catechesis" from Pontifical Salesian University, Rome. Back from Rome he served as parish priest of St. Antony’s Church Kottayi, and Fathima Matha Church Kallekad for one year. In 2007 Fr. Jose Kalluvelil was appointed Vicar of St. Raphael's Cathedral Palghat, Manager of St. Raphael's Higher Secondary School and Diocesan Consultor. After five years, in 2012, he was transferred to St. Thomas Forane Church Kanjirapuzha, where he worked for one year. In 2013 he was sent to Canada for the pastoral care of St. Thomas Syro-Malabar Community, Toronto.

On August 6, 2015, Fr. Jose Kalluvelil was appointed Exarch of the newly erected Apostolic Exarchate for the Syro-Malabar Catholics in Canada and Titular Bishop of Tabalta by Pope Francis. He was ordained Bishop on September 19, 2015. After three years, on December 22, 2018, the exarchate was elevated to the status of an Eparchy. The inauguration of the Eparchy and the installation of Bishop Jose Kalluvellil were solemnized on May 25, 2019, by Mar George Cardinal Alencherry, the Major Archbishop of the Syro-Malabar Church.
