= Eparchy of Mississauga =

Eastern Catholic eparchy in Canada

Location
- Country: Canada
- Headquarters: Mississauga
- Coordinates: 43°35′51″N 79°44′32″W

Statistics
- Population: (as of 2020); 50,000
- Parishes: Churches, missions and Holy Qurbana Centres: 66

Information
- Sui iuris church: Syro-Malabar Catholic Church
- Rite: Syro-Malabar rite
- Established: August 6, 2015
- Cathedral: St. Alphonsa Cathedral
- Patron saint: St. Thomas the Apostle
- Secular priests: 24

Current leadership
- Major Archbishop: Mar Raphael Thattil
- Bishop: Jose Kalluvelil

Website
- syromalabarcanada.com

The Eparchy of Mississauga is an ecclesiastical territory or eparchy of the Catholic Church for all Syro-Malabar Catholics in Canada. Its episcopal seat is the St. Alphonsa Cathedral in the episcopal see of Mississauga. The Eparchy is not part of any ecclesiastical province, but is immediately subject to the Holy See and depends on the Dicastery for the Oriental Churches. The Eparchy of Mississauga was first erected as an Apostolic Exarchate by Pope Francis in 2015, and was elevated to the rank of Eparchy in 2018.The first eparch of the Eparchy of Mississauga is Mar Jose Kalluvelil, appointed as its bishop at its creation in 2015.

The eparchy comprises 72 parishes, which include both churches and missions, with churches or missions in all the provinces of Canada, and one territory.

== History ==
The immigration of Syro-Malabars to Canada began in the 1960s. As the immigrant population grew, there began a need for pastoral care. The faithful then began to bring Syro-Malabar priests into Canada. The faithful attended Qurbana in various places such as churches, cafeterias, or gymnasiums.

From 2001-2014, the Canadian Syro-Malabar faithful had been pastorally served by the neighbouring, US-based Syro-Malabar Diocese of Saint Thomas the Apostle of Chicago, in whose bishop, since its creation in 2001, was vested the office of Apostolic Visitor in Canada of the Syro-Malabars.

Today, under the pastoral care of Mar Jose Kalluvelil, the Eparchy serves around 50,000 faithful through 66 centers (20 Parishes, 32 Missions, and 14 Holy Qurbana Centers) across Canada, supported by 33 priests and 7 religious sisters.

With the growing immigrant population, the Eparchy grew significantly since its elevation in 2018.

== Cathedral ==
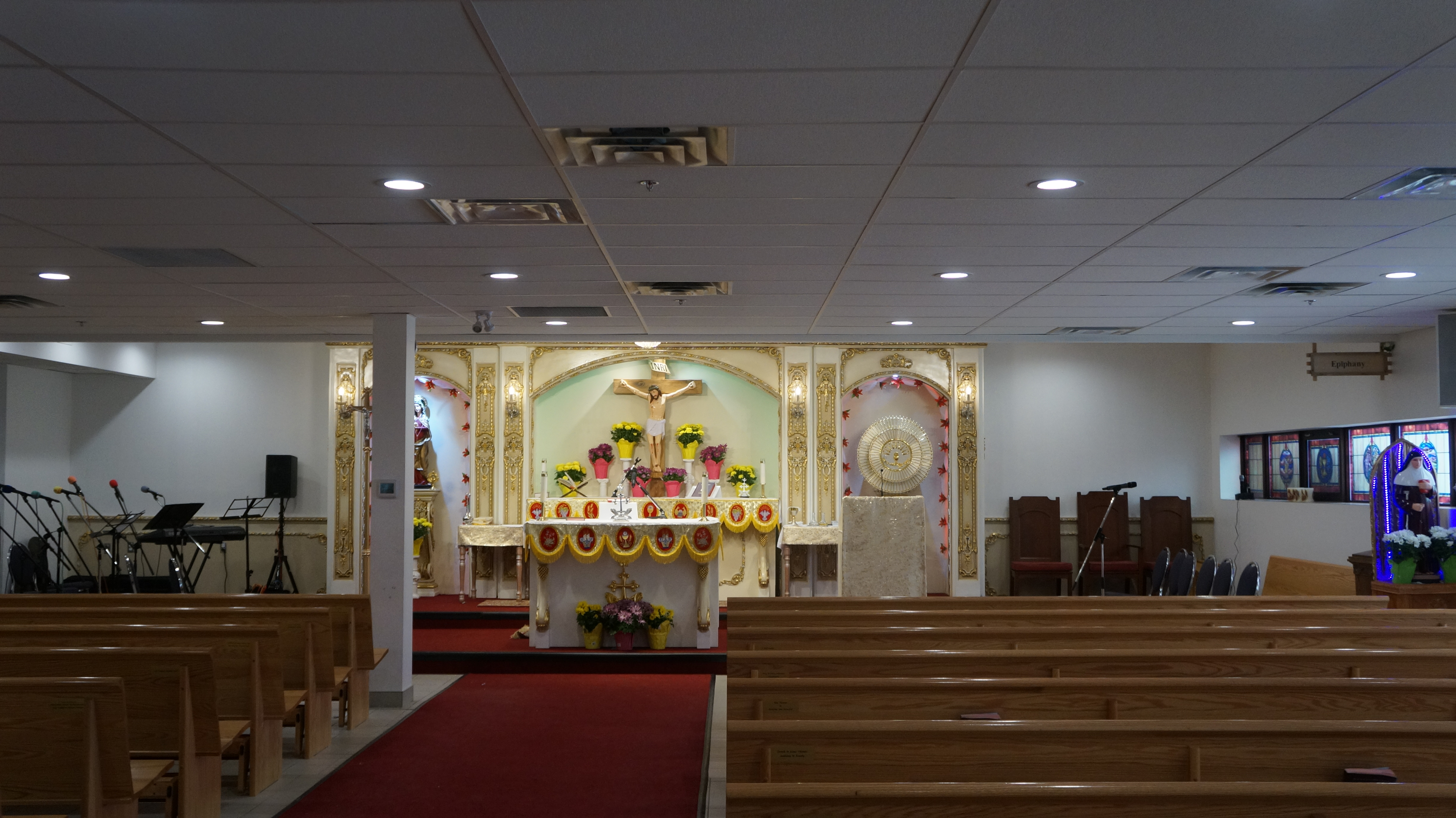
St. Alphonsa Syro Malabar Catholic Cathedral

The Cathedral for the Syro Malabars in Canada is the St Alphonsa Cathedral of Mississauga. The Cathedral was purchased in the 2010s; the Syro Malabars had previously been using a cafeteria as their gathering place. The first Church purchased was St Thomas Syro Malabar Catholic Church Scarborough, the second-largest Syro Malabar Church in Canada. All of the parishes and Missions have significant and growing populations.
