= Joseph Thachaparambath =

Indian Syro-Malabar Catholic bishop (born 1969)

Mar Joseph Thachaparambath C.M.I.
- Bishop of Adilabad
- Church: Syro-Malabar Catholic Church
- Diocese: Adilabad
- Appointed: 28 August 2025
- Predecessor: Antony Prince Panengaden
- Previous posts: Superior, Mar Thoma Province (2023–2025)

Orders
- Ordination: 4 January 1997 by Bishop Vijay Anand Nedumpuram, C.M.I.
- Consecration: 25 October 2025 by Archbishop Raphael Thattil

Personal details
- Born: 24 February 1969 (age 57) Nalumukku, India

Styles of Joseph Thachaparambath
- Reference style: His Excellency; The Most Reverend
- Spoken style: Your Excellency
- Religious style: Bishop

Joseph Thachaparambath C.M.I. (born 24 February 1969) is an Indian Syro-Malabar Catholic bishop and a member of the Carmelites of Mary Immaculate. He was elected bishop of the Eparchy of Adilabad by the Synod of Bishops of the Syro-Malabar Church on 28 August 2025, with the prior assent of Pope Leo XIV.

== Early life and education ==
Thachaparambath was born in 1969 in Nalumukku, India, to Lukose Thachaparambath and Eliamma. He holds a Bachelor of Education and Master of Education, and is currently pursuing doctoral research at Sunrise University, Rajasthan. In 1985, he entered the Carmelites of Mary Immaculate (C.M.I.) congregation and pursued studies in philosophy at the Darsana Institute of Philosophy and theology at Dharmaram College, Bangalore.

== Priesthood ==
Thachaparambath was ordained a priest on 4 January 1997. He held several pastoral and administrative roles:

- Parish ministry in two parishes of the Eparchy of Chanda.
- Administrative responsibility within the Mar Thoma Province of the C.M.I., serving as provincial economus (2002–2005; 2008–2011; 2014–2017).
- Economus of the Eparchy of Adilabad (2005–2008; 2017–2023).
- Superior of the Mar Thoma Province since 2023.

== Episcopacy ==
On 28 August 2025, the Synod of Bishops of the Syro-Malabar Major Archiepiscopal Church elected Thachaparambath as bishop of the Eparchy of Adilabad. Pope Leo XIV granted his prior assent to the election.

The appointment was part of a broader reorganization of the Syro-Malabar Church, which created four new ecclesiastical provinces—Faridabad, Ujjain, Kalyan, and Shamshabad. The Eparchy of Adilabad was made a suffragan of the newly elevated Metropolitan Archeparchy of Shamshabad.

Coverage in the Malayalam-language daily Mathrubhumi included detailed reporting and direct remarks from Thachaparambath, who expressed gratitude to church leaders and the CMI congregation while asking for prayerful support for the diocese’s mission.

His appointment was also reported in Catholic media in India and internationally, including Catholic Connect, the Catholic Bishops’ Conference of India (CBCI News), Omnes Mag in Europe, and UCA News.

== See also ==
- Syro-Malabar Catholic Church
- Carmelites of Mary Immaculate

Preceded by Prince Antony Panengaden	Bishop of Adilabad; 2025–present	Incumbent
