= Antony Prince Panengaden =

Indian Syro-Malabar Archbishop

Mar Antony Panengaden
- Metropolitan Archbishop of Shamshabad
- Church: Syro-Malabar Church
- Appointed: 28 August 2025
- Installed: 26 October 2025
- Predecessor: Raphael Thattil
- Other posts: Chairman of the commission for Evangelization and pastoral care for migrants.

Orders
- Ordination: 25 April 2007
- Consecration: 29 October 2015 by George Alencherry

Personal details
- Born: Antony Prince Panengaden; 13 March 1976 (age 50) Arimpur, Kerala, India
- Education: Dharmaram Vidya Kshetram; Pontifical Urban University

Antony Panengaden (born 13 March 1976) is an Indian Archbishop of the Syro-Malabar Church who currently serves as the Metropolitan Archbishop of Archeparchy of Shamshabad.

On 30 August 2024, Raphael Thattil appointed Panengaden to succeed him as the Bishop of Shamshabad. In 28 August 2025, with the unanimous decision of the Episcopal synod of the Syro-Malabar Church and the prior consent from Pope Leo XIV, the Major Archbishop Raphael Thattil erected the Ecclesiastical province of Shamshabad, with Shamshabad as its Metropolitan See and appointed Mar Antony Panengaden as its first Metropolitan Archbishop.

== Early life and priestly ministry ==
Panengaden was born in Thrissur district of the Archeparchy of Thrissur and after graduation of the school education, joined the religious congregation of the Carmelites of Mary Immaculate, but in a short time left the religious life and was ordained as a priest on 25 April 2007 for the Eparchy of Adilabad, after the subsequent studies and graduation in the Dharmaram Vidya Kshetram (1998–2001), University of Calcutta (2001–2003) and the Ruhalaya Major Seminary in Ujjain, India (2003–2007).

After his ordination he went abroad to pursue his studies in the Pontifical Urbaniana University in Rome, Italy, with a Doctor of Biblical Studies degree. When he returned to India, Panengaden was engaged in the pastoral work as an assistant priest in the Holy Family Cathedral in Adilabad and as a priest in charge for the mission station in Saligao.

== Bishop of Adilabad ==
On 6 August 2015, he was appointed by the Pope Francis as the second eparchial bishop of the Syro-Malabar Catholic Eparchy of Adilabad. On 29 October 2015, he was consecrated as bishop by Major Archbishop Cardinal George Alencherry and other hierarchs of the Syro-Malabar Catholic Church.

== Bishop of Shamshabad ==
On 30 August 2024, during the Third Session of the 32nd Synod of Bishops, Antony Prince Panengaden was elected as the bishop of Shamshabad, which was made vacant after the election of Raphael Thattil as the major archbishop of Ernakulam-Angamaly.

On November 10, 2024, he was consecrated as Bishop of Shamshabad by Major Archbishop Raphael Thattil and other hierarchs of the Syro-Malabar Catholic Church on the grounds of the Eparchial Curia St. Mary's Syro-Malabar Catholic Church, Konda Nagar.

Catholic Church titles
Preceded by Joseph Kunnath	Eparchial Bishop of Adilabad; 2015–present	Succeeded by Incumbent
