= George Rajendran Kuttinadar =

Indian bishop

Mar George Rajendran Kuttinadar ܓܝܘܪܓܝܣ ܪܐܓܝܢܕܪܢ ܟܘܬܝܢܐܕܪ S D B
- Bishop of Syro-Malabar Catholic Eparchy of Thuckalay
- Church: Syro-Malabar Catholic Church
- Province: Syro-Malabar Catholic Archeparchy of Changanacherry
- Diocese: Syro-Malabar Catholic Eparchy of Thuckalay
- See: Thuckalay
- Appointed: 24 August 2012
- Predecessor: George Alencherry

Orders
- Ordination: 29 December 2003
- Consecration: 16 September 2012 by George Alencherry

Personal details
- Born: 14 April 1968 (age 58) Padanthalumoodu
- Denomination: Syro-Malabar Catholic Church

George Rajendran Kuttinadar (Syriac: ܓܝܘܪܓܝܣ ܪܐܓܝܢܕܪܢ ܟܘܬܝܢܐܕܪ, romanized: Gīwargīs Rāgindran Kūthinādar, born 14 April 1968) is the bishop of the Eparchy of Thuckalay of the Syro-Malabar Catholic Church, appointed to that position by Pope Benedict XVI on 24 August 2012. He was educated in Nashik where he studied philosophy and in Shillong where he studied theology. He was formerly principal of St. Anthony’s Higher Secondary School in Shillong. He was ordained as a priest on 29 December 2003 and as a bishop on 16 September 2012.
