= Eparchy of Thuckalay =

Eastern Catholic eparchy in Tamil Nadu, India

Eparchy of Thuckalay ܡܛܪܢܘܬܐ ܕܬܟܠ
- Coat of arms

Location
- Country: India
- Ecclesiastical province: Syro-Malabar Catholic Archeparchy of Changanassery
- Headquarters: Thuckalay

Statistics
- Area: 1,794 km^{2} (693 sq mi)
- Population: Total; Catholics: (as of 2010); 2,071,258; 29,673 (1.4%)

Information
- Denomination: Catholic Church
- Sui iuris church: Syro-Malabar Catholic Church
- Rite: East Syriac Rite
- Cathedral: St. Joseph's Cathedral, Soosaipuram (under construction)
- Patron saint: Mother of Christ and Image of the Church; Saint George

Current leadership
- Pope: Leo XIV
- Major Archbishop: Mar Raphael Thattil
- Bishop: Mar George Rajendran
- Metropolitan Archbishop: Mar Thomas Tharayil

Map
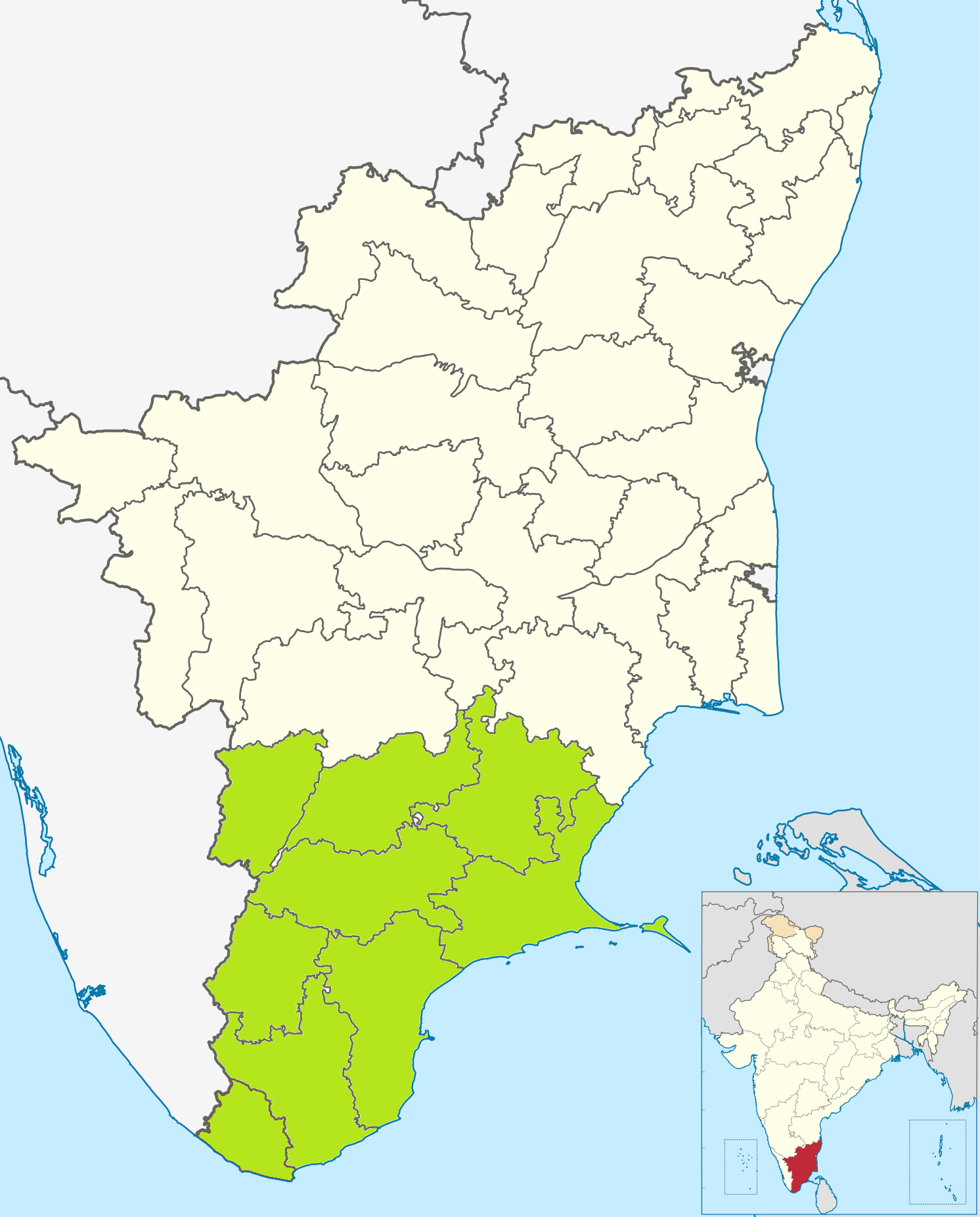

Website
- Website of the Diocese

The Eparchy of Thuckalay (Syriac: ܕܡܛܪܢܘܬܐ ܬܟܠܝ, romanized: Maṭranūthā d-Thakkala; Tamil: தக்கலை மறைமாவட்டம், romanized: Takkalai Maṟaimāvattam) is an Eastern Catholic eparchy in India, under the Syro-Malabar Catholic Church in Thuckaly, Kanyakumari District. It was founded on 11 November 1996.

== Ordinaries ==
Sl.No	Ordinary	Designation	Year of appointment	Last year of service
1	George Alencherry	Bishop	1996	2011
2	George Rajendran Kuttinadar	Bishop	2011	present
