= Eparchy of Chanda =

Eastern Catholic eparchy in Maharashtra, India

Location
- Country: India
- Ecclesiastical province: Archeparchy of Kalyan

Statistics
- Area: 32,233 km^{2} (12,445 sq mi)
- Population: Total; Catholics: (as of 2009); 3,764,000; 14,757 (0.4%)
- Parishes: 6

Information
- Denomination: Syro-Malabar Catholic Church
- Rite: East Syriac Rite
- Established: 26 February 1977
- Cathedral: Cathedral of St Thomas the Apostle in Ballarpur
- Patron saint: St Thomas the Apostle

Current leadership
- Pope: Leo XIV
- Major Archbishop: Mar Raphael Thattil
- Bishop: Mar Ephrem Nariculam
- Metropolitan Archbishop: Mar Sebastian Vaniyapurackal

Map
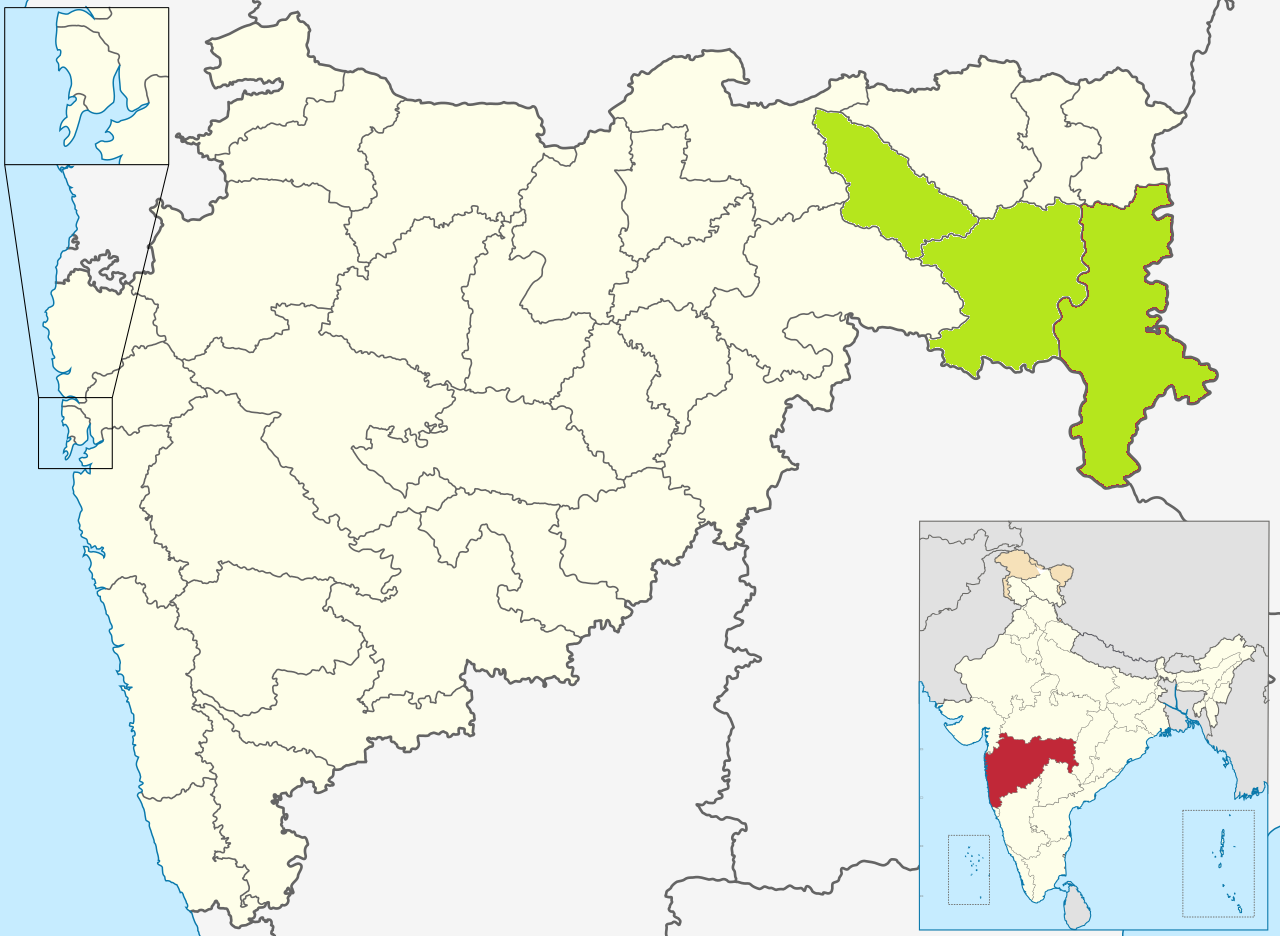

Website
- Website of the Eparchy

The Eparchy of Chanda is an eparchy (Eastern Catholic diocese) of the East Syriac Rite Syro-Malabar Catholic Church, and a suffragan of the Syro-Malabar Archeparchy of Kalyan.

Its cathedral episcopal see is St. Thomas Cathedral, in Ballarpur, in India's Maharashtra state.

== History ==
- It was created on 29 July 1968 as Apostolic Exarchate of Chanda, a pre-diocesan Eastern Catholic missionary jurisdiction, on then Latin territories, split off from its present Metropolitan, the Roman Catholic Archdiocese of Nagpur, and from the Roman Catholic Diocese of Amravati.
- Promoted as Eparchy of Chanda on 26 February 1977 by the Bull Nostra Ipsorum of Pope Paul VI, promoting its Exarch to become the first Eparch (bishop).
- Lost territory on 23 June 1999 to establish the Syro-Malabar Catholic Eparchy of Adilabad (a suffragan of the Latin Roman Catholic Archdiocese of Hyderabad)

=== Prelates ===
Apostolic Exarch of Chanda

Sl.no	Name	Designation	Year of appointment	Last year of service
1	Januarius Palathuruthy, C.M.I.	Apostolic Exarch	1968	1977

Eparchs of Chanda

Sl.no	Name	Designation	Year of appointment	Last year of service
1	Mar Januarius Palathuruthy, C.M.I.	Bishop	1977	1990
2	Mar Vijay Anand Nedumpuram, C.M.I.	Bishop	1990	2014
3	Mar Ephrem Nariculam	Bishop	2014	Present
