= Stephen Chirappanath =

Syro-Malabar bishop

Mar Stephen Chirappanath
- Apostolic Visitator for the Syro Malabar Church in Europe; Procurator for the Major Archbishop of the Syro-Malabar Church in Rome
- Church: Syro-Malabar Catholic Church
- Appointed: July 28, 2016
- Installed: November 1, 2016
- Predecessor: Office Established
- Other post: Titular Bishop of Slebte

Orders
- Ordination: December 26, 1987 by James Pazhayattil
- Consecration: November 1, 2016 by George Alencherry, Leonardo Sandri and Pauly Kannookadan

Personal details
- Born: Stephen Chirappanath; December 26, 1961 (age 64) Puthenchira, Kerala, India
- Denomination: Syro-Malabar Catholic

Mar Stephen Chirappanath (born December 27, 1961) is an Indian-born bishop of the Syro-Malabar Catholic Church in Europe. He serves as the Apostolic visitator for the Syro Malabar Church in Europe, along with that role he is the Procurator for the Major Archbishop of the Syro-Malabar Church in Rome.

== Biography ==
=== Early life and Priesthood ===
Stephen Chirappanath was born on December 26, 1961, in the village of Puthenchira in the Indian State of Kerala. He attended studies at the St. Thomas Apostolic Seminary in Vadavathoor under the Syro-Malabar Catholic Archeparchy of Changanacherry after which he obtained a Doctorate in theology at the Alphonsian Academy in Rome. He was ordained by James Pazhayattil on December 26, 1987, to the Syro-Malabar Catholic Eparchy of Irinjalakuda. After his ordination he served as a Parish Priest before going to administrative work. He served as the Director of Centres for Drug Rehabilitation, Rector of St. Paul's Minor Seminary, Irinjalakuda before going to serve as Vice Rector of his alma mater in Vadavathoor. In 2011, He moved to Rome to serve as the procurator to the Major Archbishop in Rome and the coordinator for the Syro Malabar faithful, a role which he still serves today.

=== Apostolic Visitator ===
On July 28, 2016, Pope Francis appointed Msgr. Chirappanath as the Apostolic visitator for the Syro Malabar Church in Europe. He was ordained a bishop by Cardinal and Major Archbishop of the Syro Malabar Church George Alencherry, with Cardinal Leonardo Sandri and Irinjalakuda Bishop Pauly Kannookadan at the Basilica of Saint Paul Outside the Walls on November 1, 2016.

=== Potential Elevation to Eparch ===
In the August 2022 Session of the Syro Malabar Synod of Bishops, The Synod voted to request the Apostolic See to raise the Apostolic Visitation of Europe for the Syro Malabars to a status of an Eparchy with its centre in Rome. As the Apostolic Visitator, Mar Stephen would become the Eparch of this new Europe Eparchy. Currently, there is no word if the Apostolic See will grant their request.
