= Lawrence Mukkuzhy =

Indian Catholic bishop Emeritus of Diocese of Belthangady

Mar Lawrence Mukkuzhy
- Bishop
- Church: Syro-Malabar Catholic Church
- Installed: 24 April 1999

Orders
- Ordination: 27 Dec 1978

Personal details
- Born: Lawrence Mukkuzhy; 31 August 1951 Hosmota, Kadaba, Karnataka, India
- Denomination: Catholicism
- Residence: Belthangady
- Parents: Late Smt. Rosa Mukkuzhy and Late Shri Thomas Mukkuzhy
- Education: Philosophy and Theology at the Pontifical Seminary, Aluva

Mar Lawrence Mukkuzhy (born 31 August 1951) is the Syro-Malabar Catholic bishop of Diocese of Belthangady.

== Early life ==
Mar Lawrence Mukkuzhy was born on 31 August 1951 at Hosmota, [Kadaba] in Dakshina Kannada. He was born as the 7th child to Thomas Mukkuzhy and Rosa Mukkuzhy. After his school at Aranthodu and Sullia, he joined St. Joseph's Minor Seminary, Thalassery. Mar Lawrence Mukkuzhy graduated from Nirmalagiri College, Kuthuparamba. Mar Lawrence Mukkuzhy completed his Philosophy and Theology studies from Pontifical Seminary in Aluva. On 27 December 1978 by Bishop Mar Sebastian Valloppilly, Lawrence Mukkuzhy was ordained as priest. He secured his master's degree in English literature from the University of Mysore.

== See also ==
- Most Holy Redeemer Church, Belthangady
- Belthangady
- Church Higher Primary School, Belthangady
- St. Theresa High School, Belthangady
- Roman Catholic Diocese of Mangalore
- Deanery of Belthangady
- Diocese of Belthangady
