= Major archbishop of the Syro-Malabar Church =

Major Archbishop of the Syro-Malabar Church

Maran Mar
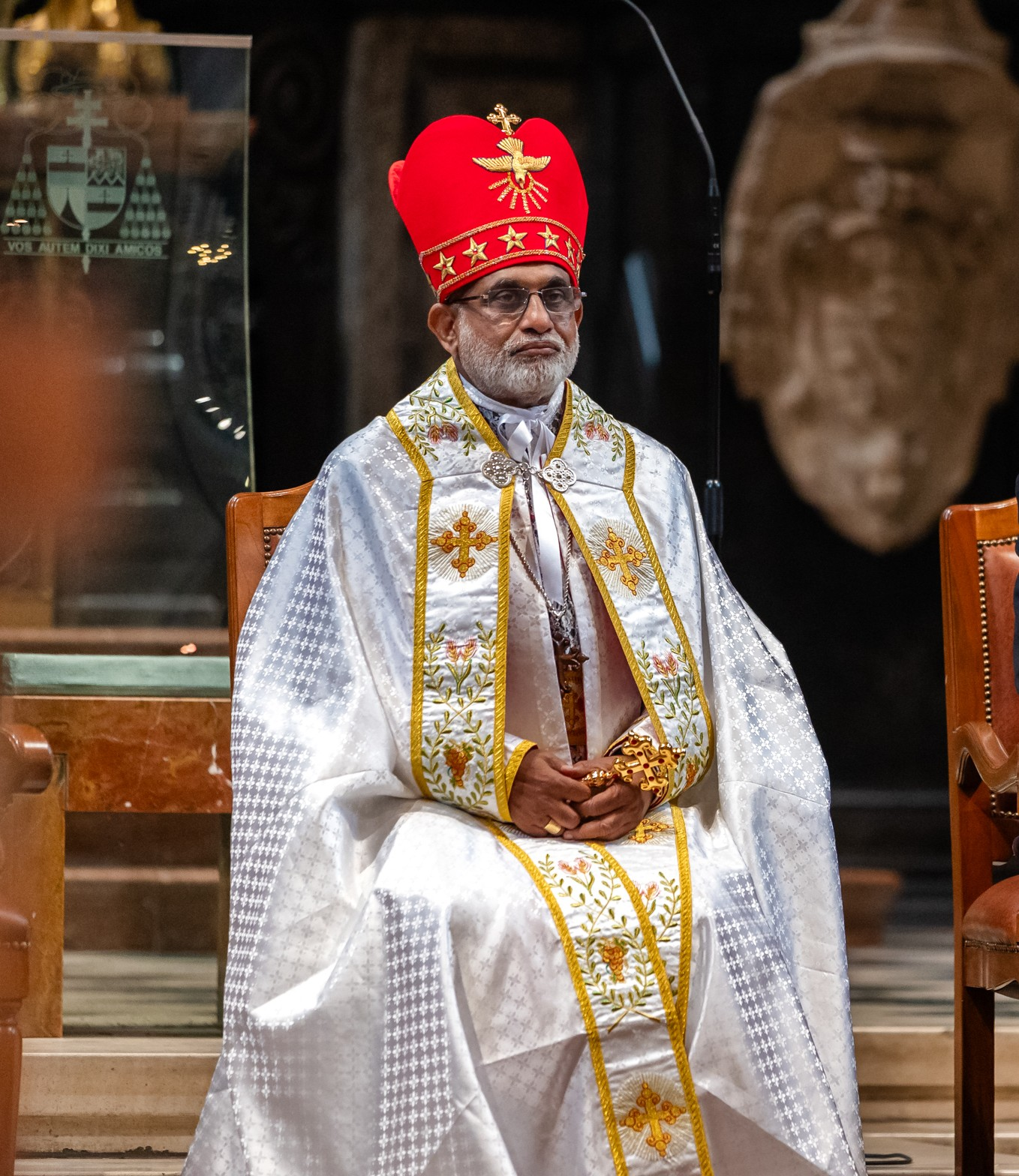
- Incumbent; Raphael Thattil ܡܳܪܝ ܪܰܦܳܐܝܶܠ ܛܰܛܺܝܠ; 11 January 2024
- Style: His Beatitude

Location
- Country: India
- Headquarters: Mount Saint Thomas, Kakkanad

Information
- Denomination: Catholic Church
- Sui iuris church: Syro-Malabar Church
- Rite: East Syriac
- Established: 16 December 1992
- Archdiocese: Ernakulam-Angamaly
- Cathedral: St. Mary's Syro-Malabar Cathedral Basilica, Ernakulam

Website
- syromalabarchurch.in

The Syro-Malabar Church, the largest Eastern Catholic Church within the Catholic Church, is led by the Major Archbishop of Ernakulam-Angamaly in Kerala, India. The Major Archbishop holds the following titles:

- Father and Head of the Syro-Malabar Church
- Major-Archbishop of the Ernakulam-Angamaly
- President of the Holy Synod of the Syro-Malabar Church
- Metropolitan of the Ecclesiastical Province of Ernakulam-Angamaly
- Metropolitan and Gate of All-India
- Successor to the throne of Mar Thoma Sliha

By virtue of his office, he is a member of the Dicastery for Eastern Churches and ranks second in the order of precedence among Major-Archbishops of the Catholic Church.

== Major Archbishops of Ernakulam-Angamaly ==
No.	Image	Name	Term	Date and Place of Birth	Age at start/end of Term	Notes
1		Mar Antony Cardinal Padiyara	16 December 1992 – 11 November 1996	11 February 1921 Manimala, Travancore	64 / 75 (†79)	First Major Archbishop of the Syro Malabar Church, with the elevation of the Metropolitan See of Ernakulam to Major-Archiepiscopal See of Ernakulam-Angamaly. Established the Syro-Malabar Synod of Bishops. Retired at the age of 75.
2		Mar Varkey Cardinal Vithayathil	23 December 1999 – 1 April 2011	29 May 1927 North Parur, Travancore	70 / 83 (†83)	Appointed by Pope John Paul II as the Apostolic Administrator (for around three years) and later elevated as the Major Archbishop on 23 December 1999. Helped establish the Eparchy of St. Thomas of Chicago along with other dioceses.
3		Mar George Cardinal Alencherry	24 May 2011 - 7 December 2023	19 April 1945 Thuruthy, Travancore	67 / 81	First Major Archbishop to be elected by the Synod of Bishops. Given the title of Metropolitan and Gate of All India (All India Jurisdiction) by the establishment of Eparchy of Shamshabad and Eparchy of Hosur. Also established the Eparchies of Mississauga, Melbourne, Great Britain, and the Apostolic Visitation to Europe, among others. Retired at the age of 78.
4		Mar Raphael Thattil	9 January 2024 - Present	21 April 1956 (age 70) Trichur, Travancore-Cochin	67	Previously served as the apostolic visitor for the Syro-Malabar faithful "outside proper territory" in India and then as the first Eparch of Shamshabad (since 2017). Elevated the Eparchies of Shamshabad, Faridabad, Kalyan, and Ujain as metropolitan archeparchies, creating new ecclesiastical provinces in India and redistributing the territories of 12 eparchies for better administration.

== Brief History ==
The Vicariate was established in 1896, when the first vicar apostolic was appointed. The Syro-Malabar's current hierarchical structure was established in 1923, and Ernakulam elevated as an archdiocese. In 1956, another archdiocese was erected. In 1993, when Syro-Malabar Catholic Church was raised to major archiepiscopal church, Ernakulam became the seat of the major archbishop.

=== Bishop of Angamaly ===
Through the Synod of Diamper, the Latin Catholic Padroado missionaries abolished the All India jurisdiction and erected the Diocese of Angamaly, suffragan to the Padroado Primatal See of Goa, in place of the Metropolitanate of All India.

- Francisco Ros (1599-1610)

=== Archbishops of Cranganore ===
- Francisco Ros (1610-1624)
- Stephen Brito, S.J. (18 Feb 1624 - 2 Dec 1641 Died)
- Francisco Garcia Mendes, S.J. (2 Dec 1641 - 3 Jan 1653) Garcia was overthrown through the Coonan Cross Oath. However he remained archbishop of Cranganore for a small minority of the remaining St. Thomas Christians until his death in 1659.
- Joseph Maria Sebastiani (1656–1663) - intrusus as the Vicar apostolic of Malabar
- Palliveettil Chandy (Alexandre de Campo) (1663-1687)

=== Vicar Apostolics of Kottayam, Thrissur, Ernakulam and Southists ===
The pope separated St. Thomas Christians in 1887 from the Vicariate of Verapoly, the local Latin Catholic hierarchy. Initially they were organised under two vicariates, Thrissur and Kottayam. Later in 1896, Ernakulam vicariate was formed by bifurcating southern parts of Thrissur and northern parts of Changanacherry. During the same time native prelates were also appointed for all three vicariates. In 1911 a fourth vicariate was established in Kottayam for southists exclusively.

Kottayam (Changanacherry)

- Charles Lavigne (1887–1896)
- Matthew Makil (11 August 1896– 30 August 1911)
- Thomas Kurialacherry (30 Aug 1911– 2 Jun 1925)

Thrissur

- Adolph Medlycott (1887–1896)
- John Menachery (11 Aug 1896 – 19 Dec 1919)
- Francis Vazhapilly (1921-1942)

Ernakulam

- Aloysius Pazheparambil (11 Aug 1896 – 9 Dec 1919)
- Augustine Kandathil (29 August 1911 - 10 January 1956)

Kottayam (Southists)

- Matthew Makil (30 August 1911– 26 January 1914)
- Alexander Chulaparambil (1914-1952)

=== Archbishop of Ernakulam ===
- Augustine Kandathil (1923 - 1956)

=== Archbishops of Ernakulam and Changanacherry ===
Changanacherry

- Mathew Kavukattu (Archbishop: 1956 –9 October 1969)
- Antony Padiyara (14 Jun 1970 –23 Apr 1985)
- Joseph Powathil (5 Nov 1985 – 22 Jan 2007)

Ernakulam

- Joseph Parecattil (20 July 1956 - 30 January 1984)
- Antony Padiyara (23 April 1985 – 16 Dec 1992)
