= Eparchy of Adilabad =

Eastern Catholic eparchy in Telangana, India

Coordinates: 19.66525°N 78.530075°E

Location
- Country: India
- Ecclesiastical province: Archeparchy of Shamshabad

Statistics
- Area: 16,210 km^{2} (6,260 sq mi)
- Population: Total; Catholics: (as of 2015); 2,741,239; 16,403 (0.6%)
- Parishes: 36

Information
- Denomination: Syro-Malabar Church
- Rite: East Syriac Rite
- Established: 23 June 1999
- Cathedral: Holy Family Cathedral in Adilabad
- Patron saint: St.Kuriakose Elias Chavara
- Secular priests: 35

Current leadership
- Pope: Mar Leo XIV
- Major Archbishop: Mar Raphael Thattil
- Bishop: Mar Joseph Thachaparambath CMI
- Metropolitan Archbishop: Mar Antony Prince Panengaden
- Bishops emeritus: Joseph Kunnath

Map
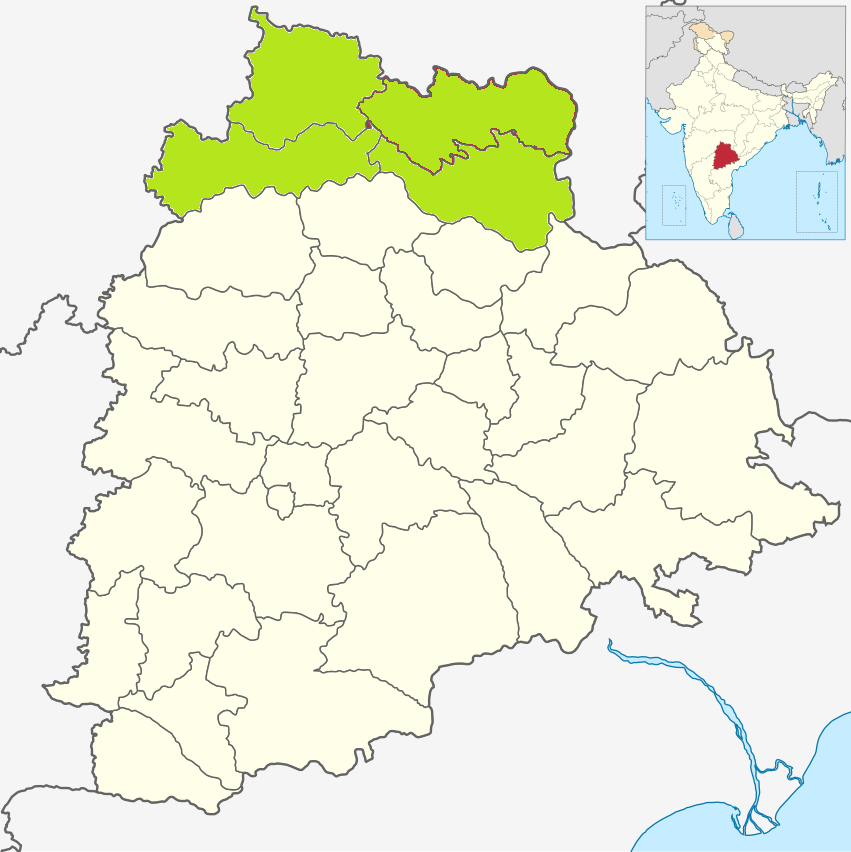

Syro-Malabar Catholic Eparchy of Adilabad was created by Pope John Paul II on 23 July 1999. The first bishop, Mar Joseph Kunnath CMI, was ordained bishop on 6 October 1999 at which time the diocese also was inaugurated.

== Ordinaries ==
Bishop's

Sl.No	Ordinary	Designation	Year of appointment	Last year of service
1	Joseph Kunnath CMI	Bishop	6th October 1999	6th August 2015
2	Antony Prince Panengaden	Bishop	6th August 2015	30th August 2024
3	Joseph Lukose Thachaparambath, C.M.I	Bishop	28th August 2025	present
