= Thomas Padiyath =

Syro-Malabar bishop

Mar Thomas Padiyath
- Auxiliary Bishop of the Shamshabad
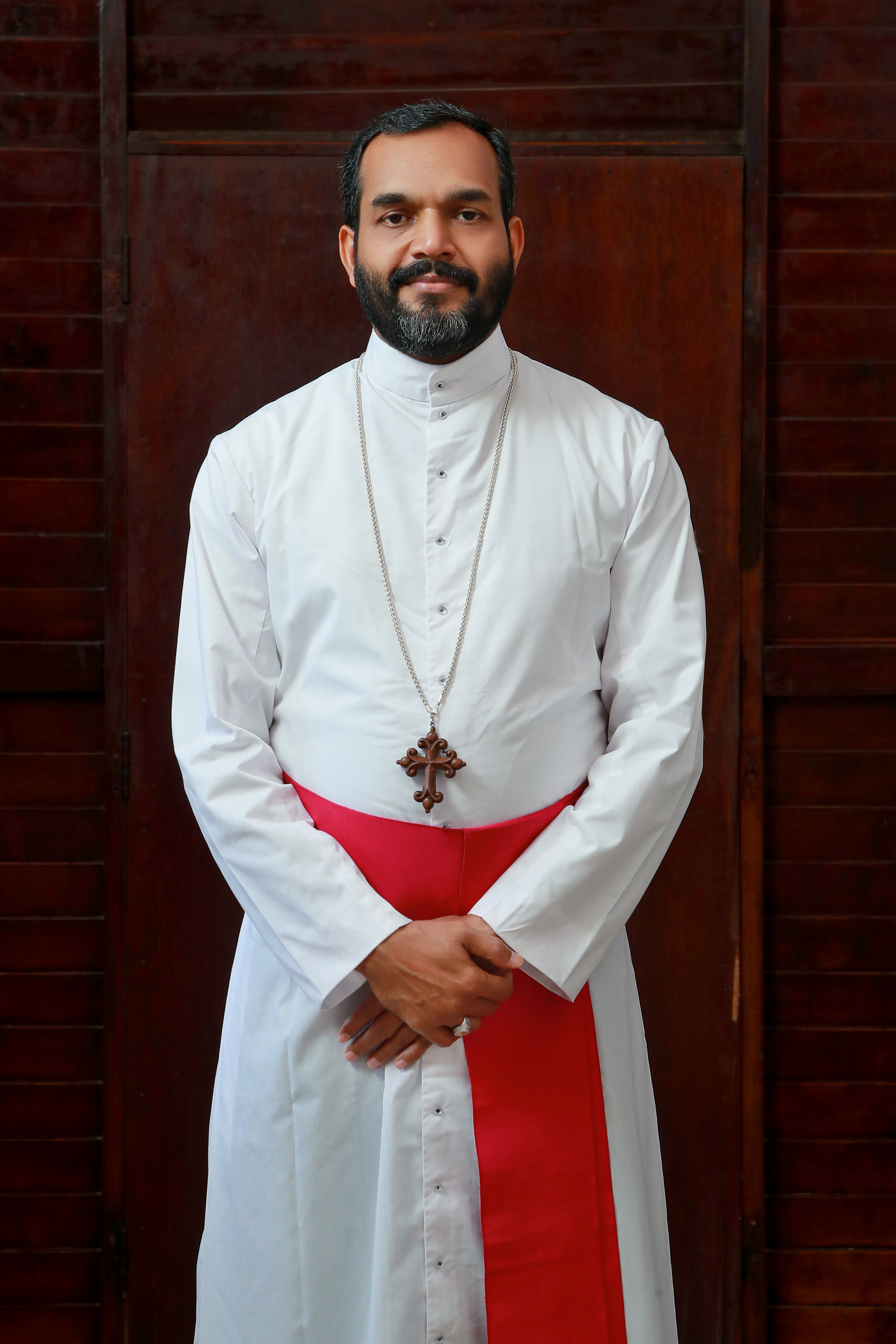
- Church: Catholic Church; Syro-Malabar Church
- Archdiocese: Archeparchy of Shamshabad
- Appointed: 25 August 2022
- Other post: Titular Bishop of Mibiarca (2022–present)

Orders
- Ordination: 29 December 1994 by Joseph Powathil
- Consecration: 9 October 2022 by George Alencherry, Joseph Perumthottam, and Raphael Thattil

Personal details
- Born: 14 January 1969 (age 57) Ettumanoor, Kerala, India

Thomas Padiyath (born 14 January 1969) is an Indian Catholic prelate of the Syro-Malabar Church in India, currently serving as an auxiliary bishop in the Archeparchy of Shamshabad.

== Biography ==
=== Early life and studies ===
Padiyath was born in Ettumanoor, Kerala, on 14 January 1969, in the Syro-Malabar Catholic Archeparchy of Changanacherry. He completed his pre degree and degree from St Berchmans College Changanasserry. When Padiyath decided to join the priesthood, He began his formation at the Minor Seminary of St. Thomas in Kurichy. He then went to St. Joseph Pontifical Seminary in Aluva for his Philosophy and Theology studies. After the completion of his studies, He was ordinated by Archbishop Joseph Powathil on 19 December 1994. After his ordination, Archbishop Powathil sent him to the Catholic University of Louvain where he received a doctorate in philosophy and licentiate in theology.

=== Ministry ===
After he returned to India from Louvain, he began his ministry as an Assistant Priest before being appointed by Powathil to be the Secretary of Archbishop of Changanacherry. After his service, He became a professor at Good Shepherd Major Seminary in Kunnoth, Jyothi Seminary and Dharmaram Vidya Kshetram in Bangalore, Mater Dei Institute in Goa, Paurastya Vidyapitham in Vadavathoor, the St. Charles Seminary in Namibia and the CANA Institute in Thuruthy. After his service in Education, Joseph Perumthottam appointed him Vicar General of Changanacherry.

=== Auxiliary Of Shamshabad ===
On 25 August 2022, Pope Francis announced and approved of the election of Padiyath as one of the two auxiliary bishops for Shamshabad by the Syro-Malabar Catholic Church Synod. He was consecrated on 9 October 2022, by Cardinal George Alencherry. He was appointed by Raphael Thattil, the Eparch of Shamshabad, special charge over the Etawah-Rajasthan region for the Eparchy.
