= Archeparchy of Shamshabad =

Syro-Malabar Catholic Archeparchy in India

Catholic

Location
- Country: India
- Territory: States (14): Andhra Pradesh, Rajasthan, Bihar, Jharkhand, Odisha, West Bengal, Sikkim, Meghalaya, Assam, Tripura, Mizoram, Manipur, Nagaland, Arunachal Pradesh; Union Territories (2): Lakshadweep, Andaman and Nicobar Islands; State territories outside the Jurisdiction of other Eparchies (3): the Eparchy of Adilabad in the State of Telangana, the Eparchy of Rajkot in the State of Gujarat, and the Eparchies of Bijnor, Gorakhpur, Satna and Faridabad in the State of Uttar Pradesh.; Districts of UTs(4): Yanam, Daman, Dadra and Nagar Haveli

Statistics
- Population: (as of 2022); 123,735 (Note: Annuario Pontificio (2023) via Catholic-Hierarchy.org)
- Parishes: 37 parishes, 69 missions
- Churches: 11 functional, 7 under construction, as of 2017

Information
- Denomination: Catholic Church
- Sui iuris church: Syro-Malabar Church
- Rite: East Syriac Rite
- Established: 10 October 2017; 9 years ago
- Cathedral: St. Alphonsa Syro-Malabar Catholic Church, Kukatpally
- Patron saint: Mar Thoma Sliha; St. John Paul II, co-patron
- Secular priests: 72 (52 diocesan, 20 religious)

Current leadership
- Pope: Leo XIV
- Major Archbishop: Mar Raphael Thattil
- Metropolitan Archbishop: Mar Antony Panengaden
- Suffragans: Eparchy of Adilabad
- Auxiliary Bishops: Mar Joseph Kollamparambil; Mar Thomas Padiyath

Website
- shamshabaddiocese.org

The Archeparchy of Shamshabad is an archeparchy of the Syro-Malabar Catholic Church based in Telangana, India. It was established by Pope Francis on 10 October 2017 as an eparchy, and Mar Raphael Thattil was appointed its first eparch. In a letter to the bishops of India, Francis cited India's decades of experience with "overlapping jurisdictions" of different sui iuris churches. He wrote: "With the growth of spiritual friendship and mutual assistance, any tension or apprehension should be swiftly overcome. May this extension of the pastoral area of the Syro-Malabar Church in no way be perceived as a growth in power and domination, but as a call to deeper communion, which should never be perceived as uniformity." On 28 August 2025, the eparchy was elevated to an archeparchy.

The new jurisdiction was inaugurated with Mar Thattil's installation on 7 January 2018. The cathedral is the St. Alphonsa Syro-Malabar Catholic Church at Kukatpally, in Greater Hyderabad.

There are 130,000 Catholics in the Shamshabad diocese with eleven functional churches and seven under construction.

== Regional administration ==
The eparchy is divided into several regions that are headed by regional superiors, often from missions of religious congregations, for better administration. The two Auxiliary Eparchs are given charge of two of the prominent mission regions of the eparchy. Mar Joseph Kollamparambil heads the Gujarat mission region and Mar Thomas Padiyath heads the Etawah-Jaipur mission region.

=== Etawah-Jaipur region ===
The Etawah-Jaipur Mission region comprises the former missions of Etawah (Agra Mission) and Jaipur of the Archeparchy of Changanassery.

The Etawah mission, was established in 1975 using the guildlines of the 1974 CBCI Calcutta chapter, and of dialogues between the Latin Catholic Archdiocese of Agra and the Syro-Malabar Catholic Archeparchy of Changanacherry. The mission spreads across several Latin dioceses of the Agra province. It was a result of the collaboration between the then Archbishops Dominic Athaide of Agra and Mar Antony Padiyara of Changanassery. The mission worked across all fields fulfilling the needs of the community and beyond.

When the Eparchy of Shamshabad was erected in 2017, the mission region came under its territorial jurisdiction, and as part of the agreement signed in 2018 February between the Eparchy of Shamshabad and Archeparchy of Changanassery, the Etawah-Jaipur mission would be granted administrative, pastoral and missionary autonomy hitherto enjoyed under the Archdiocese of Agra. With a clause added that the regions under the mission, may in time raised to the dignity of an Eparchy or Exarchate in due course of time.

The Jaipur mission (St. Mary's mission) was set up in 2015 as an initiative of Mar Joseph Perumthottam, and in wake of the all India jurisdiction of the church and rising needs of pastoral care in the state of Rajastan. With collaboration between the Eparch of Shamshabad, even before its formation, this mission that spread across 12 districts of Rajasthan worked extensively. And later entered into a similar agreement like that of Etawah mission, with the newly formed eparchy.

In the 30th Synod of the Syro-Malabar, 2022. Mar Thomas Padiyath was made Auxiliary eparch of Shamshabad with a special charge of the Etawah-Jaipur region.

=== Sabarmati (Gujarat) region ===
Since 2009, the Missionary Congregation of the Blessed Sacrament (MCSB), through its Emmaus Province, worked in the Gujarat mission, to tend to the pastoral needs of the Syro-Malabar faithful in the dioceses of Ahmedabad and Baroda.

Following the 30th Synod, Mar Joseph Kollamparambil was made Auxiliary eparch of Shamshabad with special charge of the Sabarmati mission, which encompasses the remaining districts of the State of Gujarat (removing those under eparchy of Rajkot), and the Union territory of Daman Diu Dadar and Nagar Haveli.

== Suffragans ==
- Eparchy of Adilabad

== Prelates ==
Bishop's

Sl.No	Ordinary	Designation	Year of appointment	Last year of service
1	Raphael Thattil	Bishop	2017	2024
2	Antony Prince Panengaden	Bishop	2024	2025

Archbishop's

Sl.No	Ordinary	Designation	Year of appointment	Last year of service
1	Antony Prince Panengaden	Archbishop	2025	Present

Auxiliary Bishop's

Sl.No	Ordinary	Designation	Year of appointment	Last year of service
1	Joseph Kollamparambil	Auxiliary bishop	2022	Present
2	Thomas Padiyath	Auxiliary bishop	2022	Present
