= Raphael Thattil =

Head of the Syro-Malabar Church (b. 1956)

Mar Raphael Thattil ܡܵܪܝ ܪܲܦܵܐܝܸܠ ܛܲܛܝܼܠ
- Major Archbishop of the Syro-Malabar Church Metropolitan Archbishop of Ernakulam-Angamaly
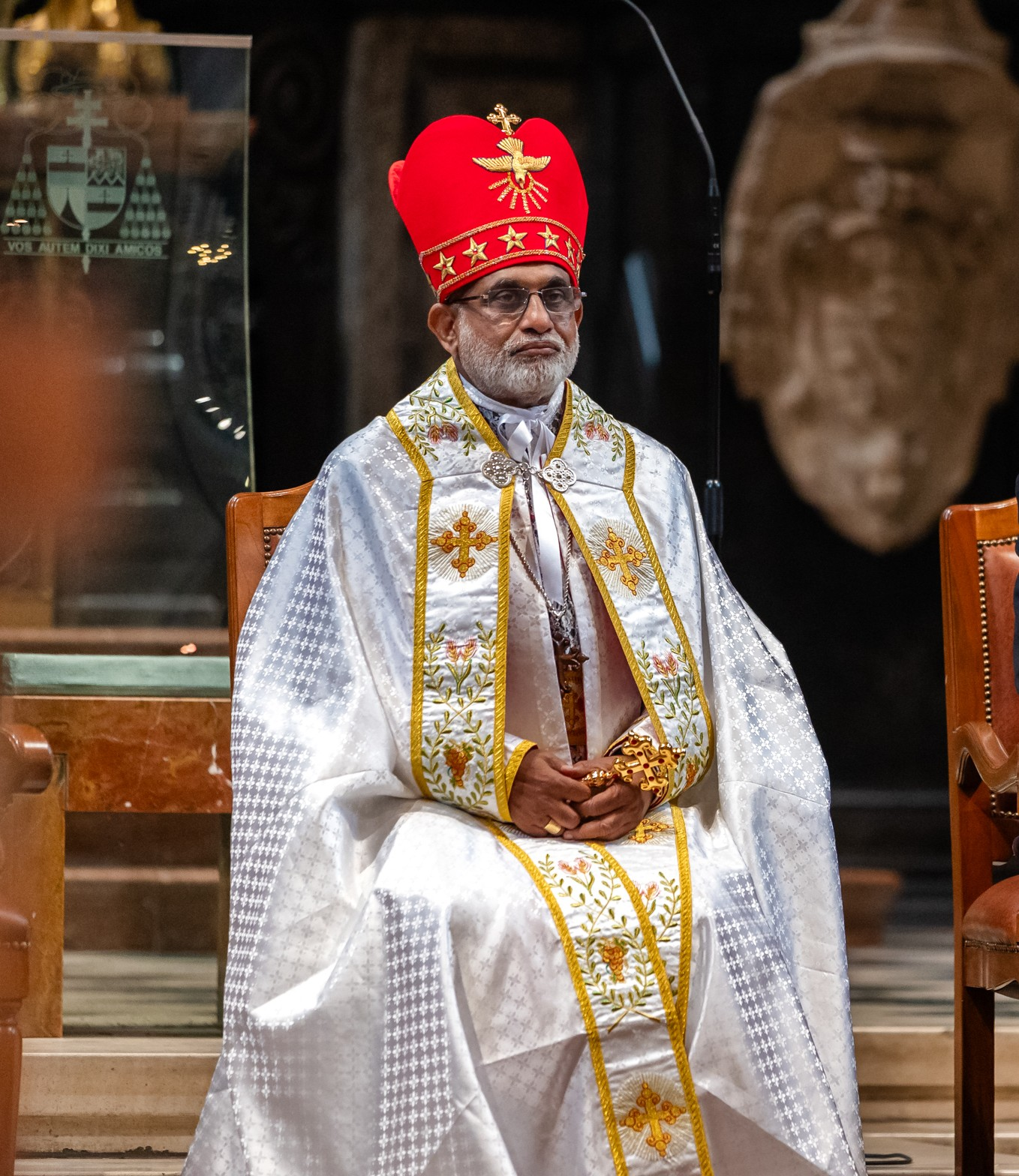
- Thattil in 2025
- Church: Syro-Malabar Church
- See: Ernakulam-Angamaly
- Elected: 9 January 2024
- Installed: 11 January 2024
- Predecessor: George Alencherry
- Other post: Metropolitan Archbishop of Ernakulam-Angamaly
- Previous posts: Bishop of Shamshabad (2017‍–‍2024); Apostolic Visitator for Outside The Territory in India (2013‍–‍2017); Auxiliary Bishop of Thrissur (2010‍–‍2017)

Orders
- Ordination: 21 December 1980 by Joseph Kundukulam
- Consecration: 10 April 2010 by Andrews Thazhath
- Rank: Major Archbishop

Personal details
- Born: 21 April 1956 (age 70) Trichur, Travancore-Cochin (now Kerala), India
- Residence: Mount Saint Thomas, Kakkanad
- Education: Pontifical Oriental Institute, Rome; Paurastya Vidyapitam, Vadavathoor
- Motto: To Be Broken and Given

Ordination history
History
Priestly ordination
- Ordained by: Joseph Kundukulam
Episcopal consecration
- Principal consecrator: Andrews Thazhath
- Co-consecrators: Jacob Thoomkuzhy and Jacob Manathodath
Episcopal succession
Bishops consecrated by Raphael Thattil as principal consecrator
- Mar George Koovakad: 2024
- Mar Joseph Thachaparambath CMI: 2025
- Mar James Patteril CMF: 2025

Styles of Raphael Thattil
- Reference style: His Beatitude
- Spoken style: Your Beatitude
- Religious style: Mar

Raphael Thattil (Syriac: ܡܵܪܝ ܪܲܦܵܐܝܸܠ ܛܲܛܝܼܠ) (born 21 April 1956) is an Indian prelate who serves as the Major Archbishop of the Syro-Malabar Church, the largest Eastern Catholic Church, and as the Metropolitan Archbishop of Ernakulam-Angamaly since January 2024.

Thattil was appointed and installed as the auxiliary bishop of Thrissur in 2010 to serve along with metropolitan archbishop Andrews Thazhath. In 2013, Pope Francis appointed him as the apostolic visitator for all members of the Syro-Malabar Church in India outside their own territory. He served in these roles until he was appointed the first bishop of the newly erected Eparchy of Shamshabad in 2017. In January 2024, he was elected major archbishop by the Holy Synod of the Syro-Malabar Church to succeed George Alencherry (2011-2023).

== Early life and priesthood ==
Raphael Thattil was born in Trichur, Kerala on 21 April 1956 as the youngest of 10 children of Ouseph and Thresia Thattil and was a member of the Basilica of Our Lady of Dolours. In 1971, He began his priestly formation at the St. Mary's Minor Seminary in Trichur and completed his studies at the St. Thomas Apostolic Seminary (Paurastya Vidyapitam), Vadavathoor, Kottayam for Philosophy and Theology. On 21 December 1980, Mar Joseph Kundukulam ordained him as a priest for the Archdiocese of Thrissur at his home parish of the Basilica of Our Lady of Dolours. He was sent for further studies at the Pontifical Oriental Institute in Rome by Bishop Kundukulam for a doctorate in Oriental Canon Law.

=== Priesthood ===
Thattil began his Priestly Ministry as the Assistant Vicar in Aranattukara and as the Assistant Procurator at St. Mary's Minor Seminary in Trichur (his alma mater). In 1988 After his studies he was appointed by Mar Kundukulam as the Vice Chancellor of the Archdiocese, Vice Rector of St. Mary's Minor Seminary, and Diocesan Biblical Catechetical Liturgical Center Director. In 1998, When Jacob Thoomkuzhy was appointed Archbishop, He served under the Archbishop as the Chancellor and Eparchial Judge of the Archdiocese which he held until 2000. In 1998, Thoomkuzhy also appointed him as the First Rector of the Mary Matha Major Seminary. When Andrews Thazhath became archbishop in 2007, He asked Thattil to serve as the Protosyncellus of the Archdiocese. A role which he held until his appointment as bishop.

== Auxiliary Bishop of Trichur ==
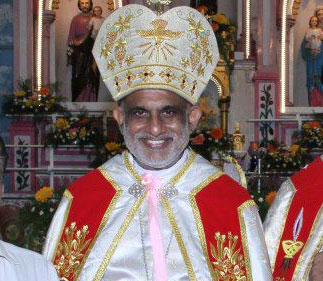
Thattill in 2012

On 18 January 2010, Raphael Thattil was elected by the Synod of Bishops to serve as the Auxiliary Bishop of the Syro-Malabar Catholic Archeparchy of Thrissur and was appointed by Pope Benedict XVI as the Titular Bishop of Buruni. He was ordained a bishop on 10 April 2010 at the Basilica of Our Lady of Dolours by Trichur Archbishop Andrews Thazhath in the presence of Trichur Archbishop Emeritus Jacob Thoomkuzhy and Palaghat Bishop Jacob Manathodath. During his role, he served as the Chairman of Kerala Charismatic Movement for the Kerala Catholic Bishops' Council and the Manager of St. Thomas College, Thrissur. He was also chosen as the ecclesiastical adviser of Jesus Youth.

=== Apostolic Visitator for outside the territory in India (2013-2017) ===
On 23 December 2013, At the Request of Leonardo Sandri and George Alencherry, Pope Francis appointed Thattil as the Apostolic Visitator for all the lay faithful of the Syro Malabar Church living in India outside their own Territory (without an Eparchy of their own). During his time as Apostolic Visitator, he brought 88 Priests to work in the Mission and served 23 states, 2 Union Territories, and 2 Islands.

== Bishop of Shamshabad ==
On 10 October 2017, Francis announced the erection of the Eparchy of Shamshabad based in Shamshabad, Telangana but would serve 23 states, two union territories and two islands that were not included in any other Syro Malabar Eparchies. In a letter to all the bishops of India, Francis announced the "All India Jurisdiction" of the Syro-Malabar Church. The Eparchy was created with 130,000 Syro-Malabar Catholics with a Catherdal in the name of St. Alphonsa in Kukatpally. The Eparchy is the largest in all of India and during his tenure as bishop, he established 50 Parishes and 85 Missions throughout the territories. On 25 August 2022, he received two Auxiliary Bishops to assist him in Thomas Padiyath and Joseph Kollamparambil.

== Major Archbishop ==
On 9 January 2024, the Synod of Bishops convened and elected Raphael Thattil as the fourth Major Archbishop of the Syro-Malabar Church replacing George Alencherry. Pope Francis addressed a letter to the newly elected Major Archbishop with his consent. On 10 January 2024, it was announced simultaneously at the Vatican and at a Press Conference at Mount St. Thomas, Kakkanad. He was installed in a simple ceremony at Mount St. Thomas, Kakkanad on 11 January 2024.

Catholic Church titles
Preceded by Anthony Fisher	Titular Bishop of Buruni; 2010–2017	Succeeded by Daniele Libanori
New title	Eparch of Shamshabad; 2017–2024	Succeeded by Antony Prince Panengaden
Preceded by George Alencherry	Major Archbishop of Ernakulam-Angamaly; 2024–present	Incumbent
