= Mar (title) =

Ecclesiastical title

Mar (Classical Syriac: ܡܪܝ Mār(y), written with a silent final yodh), also Mor in Western Syriac, is an Aramaic word meaning "my lord". The corresponding feminine forms in Syriac are Mart and Mort for "my lady" (Syriac: ܡܪܬܝ, Mārt(y)).

A similar word Mar, meaning “lord,” is used in Jewish Babylonian Aramaic: מָר.

These titles are used in Judaism and Syriac Christianity.

== In Christianity ==
It is a title of reverence in Syriac Christianity, where the title is placed before the Christian name of saints, as in Mar Aprem / Mor Afrem for Ephrem the Syrian, and Mart / Mort Maryam for St Mary. It is given to all saints and is also used in instead of "Most Reverend", just before the name in religion taken by bishops. An example of the title mar being applied to a saint outside of the Assyrian tradition is found in Ethiopia where the Emperor Gelawdewos was bestowed with it after falling in battle during his decades long conflict with Muslim invaders, as well as to Ephrem the Syrian and Isaac. The title of Moran Mor / Maran Mar is given to the Patriarch and other primates; and the title Mar / Mor is given to prelates such as metropolitan bishops or archbishops.

The variant Maran or Moran (Syriac: ܡܪܢ, Māran), meaning "Our Lord", is a particular title given to Jesus, either alone or in combination with other names and titles. Likewise, Mart or Mort (Syriac: ܡܪܬܢ, Mārtan, "Our Lady") is a title of Mary, mother of Jesus, and of other female saints.

Occasionally, the term Maran or Moran has been used by various Eastern Christian patriarchs and catholicoi, who started using it in the recent centuries. The Syriac Orthodox Patriarch of Antioch, the Jacobite Syrian Catholicos titles are called Moran Mor, while the Malankara Orthodox Catholicos use the title Moran Mor. Sometimes the Indian bearers of this title are called Moran Mar, using a hybrid style from both Syriac dialects that reflects somewhat the history of Syro-Malabar Christians. The Pope is referred to as Marpāpa (Holy Father) by the St Thomas Christians of India.

The variant Marya or Moryo (Syriac: ܡܪܝܐ, Māryā) is the original form of Mara/Moro, but only used in reference to God in the circle of Syriac Christianity. This word is used in the Peshitta Old Testament to render the Tetragrammaton. Although Mara/Moro is clearly a derived form of the above Marya/Moryo, and ultimately has roots in common Semitic, there is a fanciful derivation found in early Syriac lexica, that the word is an initialism as follows:

- ܡ — ܡܪܘܬܐ, māruṯā, 'lordship'
- ܪ — ܪܒܘܬܐ, rabbuṯā, 'majesty'
- ܝ ܐ — ܐܝܬܝܐ, iṯyā, 'self-existence'

== In Judaism ==
In Mishnaic Hebrew through to date, this Aramaic word is pronounced [mar] (Hebrew: מָר), and it is used as a formal way of addressing or referring to a male person. In the Talmud, Tabyomi is sometimes referred to as Mar, and Samuel of Nehardea, as Mar Samuel. "Mar" was also the honorific of the Talmudic Exilarchs and according to Sherira ben Hanina, formed part of names like "Amemar". In the Geonic period, "Mar" could be used for any notable and the Geonim were generally known by the double title "Mar-Rav". The derived terms marana (our master) and maranan (our masters), especially when combined with Rabbi for marana verabbana and maranan verabbanan, became popular in the Rishonic period and remain so today.

In the Modern Hebrew of contemporary Israel, "Mar" is used without distinction for any male person, by analogy with "Mr." in English. Similarly feminine "Marat", which acquired this use centuries earlier, originally parallel to masculine "Reb". In Orthodox circles, especially among Jews from the Middle East, the variant form Maran (מָרָן, cf. Rabban) is used for highly appreciated Rabbis, such as Ovadia Yosef, the spiritual leader of the Shas party.

== See also ==
- Syriac Christianity
- Syriac language
- Ancient Christianity in the Indian subcontinent
