= Sebastian Adayantharath =

Syro-Malabar Catholic bishop (born 1957)

Mar Sebastian Adayanthrath
- Bishop of Syro Malabar Eparchy of Mandya
- Province: Tellicherry
- Diocese: Mandya
- Predecessor: Antony Kariyil
- Previous posts: Titular Bishop of Macriana Maior, Auxiliary Bishop of Ernakulam-Angamaly

Orders
- Ordination: 18 December 1983
- Consecration: 20 April 2002

Personal details
- Born: 5 April 1957 (age 69) Vaikom, Kerala, India

Sebastian Adayantharath (born 5 April 1957) is a Syro-Malabar Catholic bishop. He is the current bishop of Mandya and also a former auxiliary bishop of the Archdiocese of Ernakulam-Angamaly.

== Biography ==
=== Early life ===
Mar Sebastian Adayantharath was born on 5 April 1957 of Ouseph Chacko and Thresiamma at Vaikom, Kerala. He had his school education at St Joseph's LP School and St Theresa's High School, Vaikom from 1963 to 1973. He joined the Sacred Heart Minor Seminary of the Archdiocese of Ernakulam-Angamaly on 1 July 1973. Three years later he was sent to the Papal Seminary, Pune where he did his seminary studies from 1976 to 1983 and was ordained priest on 18 December 1983 by Bishop Mar Sebastian Mankuzhikary at St Joseph's Pontifical Seminary, Alwaye.

=== Career ===
After his ordination, Fr. Adayantharath took a master's degree in Theology from Jnana-Deepa Vidyapeeth, Pune. During his priestly ministry in the archdiocese he served as parish priest and secretary to the late Cardinal Mar Antony Padiyara. He serves on the Board of Trustees of 'Save A Family Plan' organization in Canada.

His appointment as Bishop Auxiliary of Ernakulam-Angamaly and Titular Bishop of Macriana Maior (in ancient Byzantium, Turkey) was announced on 4 February 2002 and he was consecrated Bishop on 20 April 2002 by Major Archbishop Cardinal Mar Varkey Vithayathil at St Mary's Cathedral Basilica, Ernakulam. In the wake of an investigation surrounding a controversial land deal which allegedly resulted in the Archdiocese losing $10 million, Bishop Manathodath was appointed the apostolic administrator of Ernakulam-Angamaly in June 2018. After his term ended, Cdl. Alencherry resumed office on 27 June 2019 and Bishop Adayanthrath and co-Auxiliary Bishop Jose Puthenveetil were moved out of the archdiocese. Unlike Cdl. Alencherry, Bishop Adayantharath did not face criminal charges and was later appointed as the Bishop of Syro-Malabar Eparchy of Mandya by the Holy Synod of Syro-Malabar Catholic Church and Pope Francis on 30 August 2019.

== See also ==
- Catholic Church in India
