= Archeparchy of Ernakulam-Angamaly =

Eastern Catholic archeparchy in Keralam, India

Coordinates: 9.9806°N 76.3011°E

Archeparchy of Ernakulam–Angamaly
- Coat of arms

Location
- Country: India
- Ecclesiastical province: Ernakulam-Angamaly

Statistics
- Area: 1,500 km^{2} (580 sq mi)
- Population: Total; Catholics: (as of 2022); 4,680,900; 653,670 (14%)

Information
- Denomination: Catholic Church
- Sui iuris church: Syro-Malabar Catholic Church
- Rite: East Syriac
- Established: 28 July 1896
- Cathedral: St. Mary's Cathedral Basilica, Ernakulam
- Co-cathedral: Mar Hormizd Syro-Malabar Cathedral, Angamaly
- Patron saint: Sacred Heart of Jesus
- Secular priests: 462

Current leadership
- Pope: Leo XIV
- Major Archbishop: Raphael Thattil
- Assistant bishop: Joseph Pamplany as 'Vicar of the Major Archbishop'
- Bishops emeritus: George Alencherry; Antony Kariyil; Thomas Chakiath

Website
- Website of the Archdiocese

The Archeparchy of Ernakulam–Angamaly is the major archeparchy and the see of the Major Archbishop of the Syro-Malabar Catholic Church. It has been the major archeparchy since 1992 when the Syro-Malabar Catholic Church was elevated to the status of a major archiepiscopal church with Ernakulam-Angamaly as the primatal see. The major archbishop of Ernakulam-Angamaly is the main bishop of the jurisdiction, at the same time the head of the Syro-Malabar Catholic Church. The eparchies of Kothamangalam and Idukki are the two suffragan eparchies of the major archeparchy.

The see of Ernakulam-Angamaly occupies a prominent position in the history of the Syro-Malabar. It is the diocese which contains the historic places Kottakkavu, Kokkamangalam and Malayattoor associated with St. Thomas. The diocese also witnessed many significant events like the Synod of Diamper, Coonan Cross Oath and the Angamaly Padiyola. The present Syro-Malabar faithful were under the jurisdiction of the Archdiocese of Verapoly and European bishops since the 1600s. Pope Leo XIII separated the Syro-Malabars from Latin Church jurisdiction and he established the vicariates of Ernakulam, Thrissur and Changanassery for Syro-Malabar Catholics by the late 19th century. Ernakulam–Angamaly was established as a Vicariate by the Bull Quae Rei Sacrae of Pope Leo XIII on 28 July 1896 and Mar Louis Pazheparambil was appointed as the first figure apostolic, who assumed charge on 5 November 1896. Under the able guidance of Mar Pazheparambil, the vicariate began to flourish. The city of Ernakulam was chosen to be the location for the bishop's house which was completed and blessed on 24 April 1900. When the Syro-Malabar Hierarchy was established in 1923, Ernakulam was chosen as the see. In 1992, the name of the diocese was changed to Ernakulam - Angamaly and it became the Major Archdiocese.

Mar Cardinal George Alencherry was the Major Archbishop till his resignation on 7 December 2023. Until July 2022, Archbishop Mar Antony Kariyil CMI was the Vicar of Major Archbishop, responsible for the administration of the major archeparchy. Mar Andrews Thazhath, Archbishop of Thrissur Archeparchy, was appointed by the Pope Francis as the apostolic administrator of the same, replacing Mar Antony Kariyil. On 7 December 2023, he too resigned. Mar Bosco Puthur became the Apostolic Administrator of the Major Archeparchy. On 11 January 2025, The Holy See granted the Archdiocese back to the Major Archbishop, who named Mar Joseph Pamplany as the Vicar of the Major Archbishop.

The Ernakulam-Angamaly Archdiocese caused a major controversy for the Syro-Malabar Church around the implementation of celebrating uniform mode of Holy Mass. Archbishop Mar Antony Kariyil's leadership and resignation in 2022, against the backdrop of resistance to Archbishop Mar George Alencherry, marked a significant phase. The dispute escalated with protests and the closure of St. Mary's Cathedral Basilica in Ernakulam. Despite Pope Francis's directives for unity and a deadline for resolution, conflicts persisted, leading to significant opposition and actions against Vatican-appointed Archbishop Cyril Vasiľ & his Secretary Rev. Dr. George Thekkekara by the laity of the Archdiocese. The Pope's direct intervention on 7 December 2023 emphasized reconciliation and adherence to Catholic principles or face excommunication.

== History ==
=== Vicariate to Major Archeparchy ===
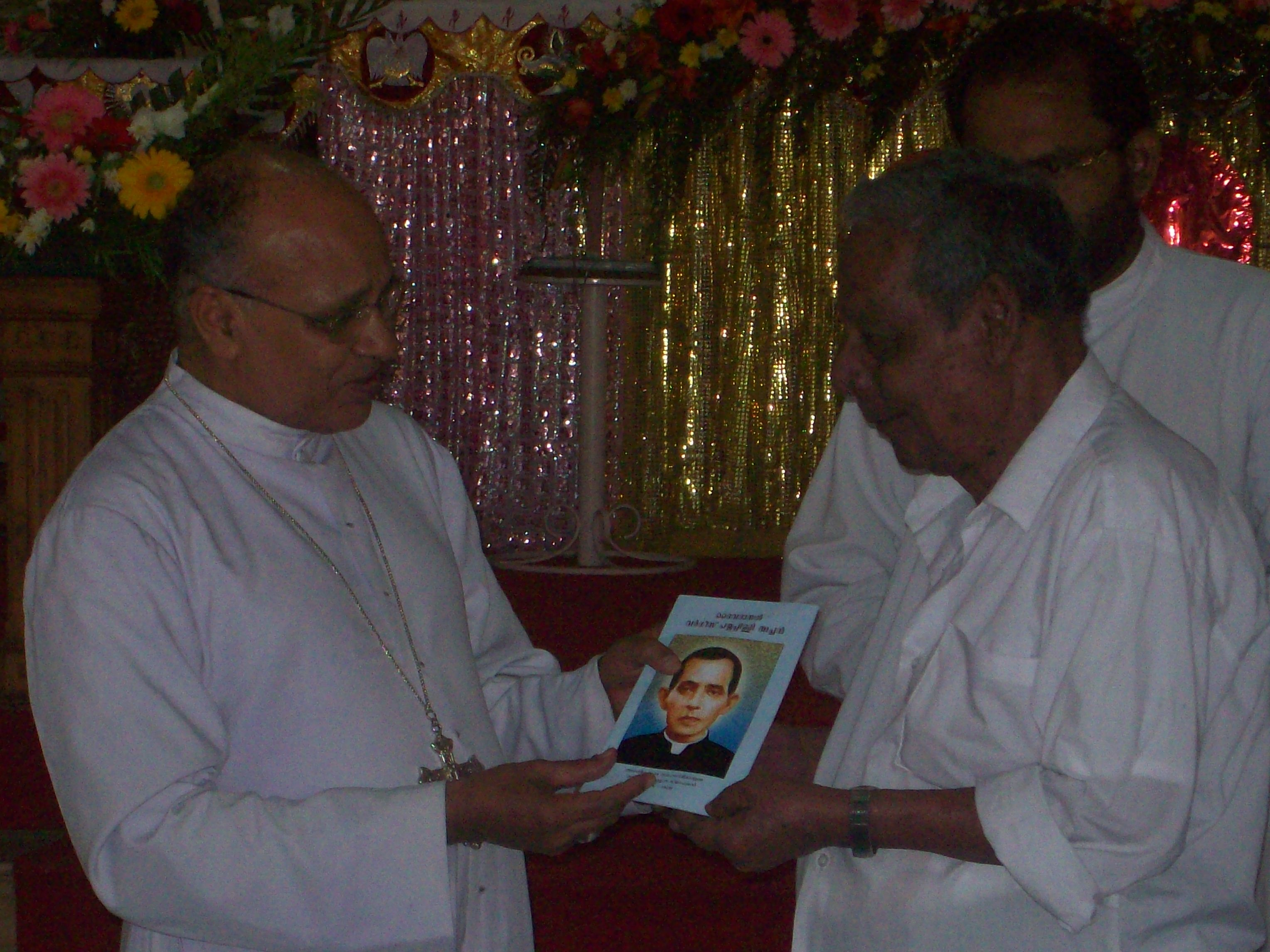
Mar Jacob Manathodath, Former Apostolic Administrator of Ernakulam-Angamaly, releasing the biography of Venerable Payyappilly Mar Varghese Kathanar during his 82nd death anniversary by handing over a copy of it to his great-nephew Mathai Payyappilly Palakkappilly

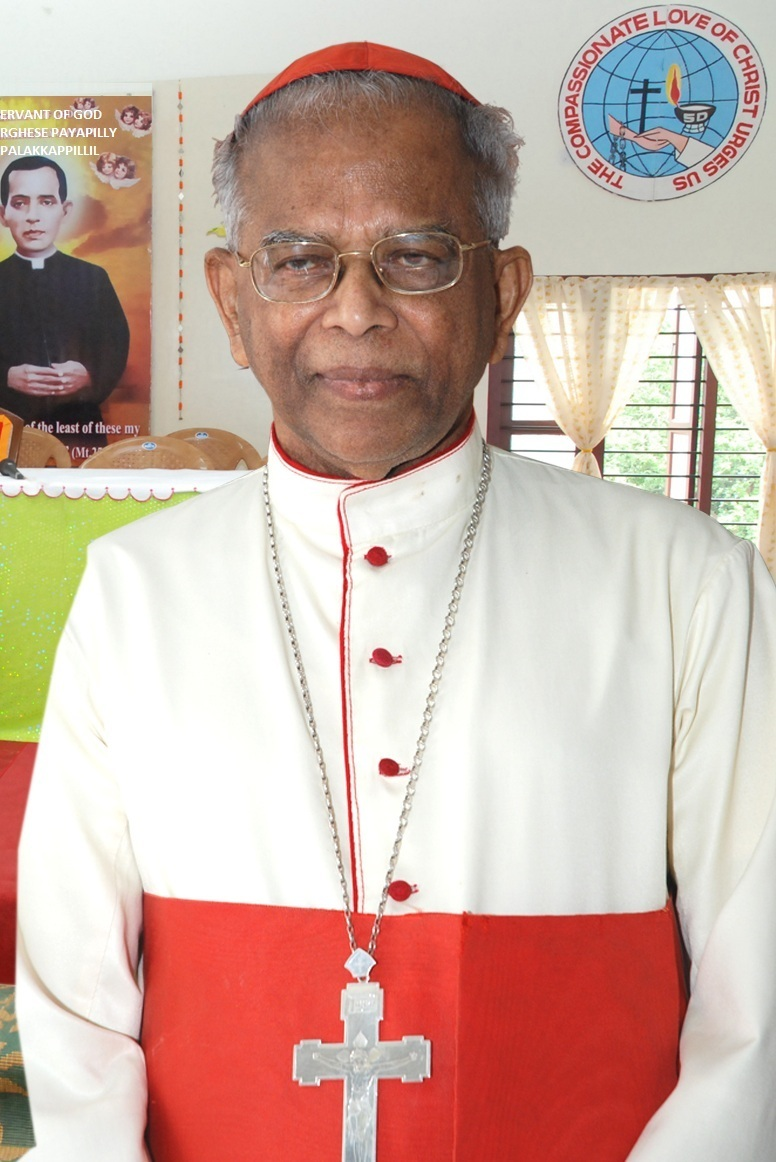
Former Major Archbishop Mar Varkey Cardinal Vithayathil

In 1896, Pope Leo XIII established the Vicariate of Ernakulam by the papal bull Quae Rei Sacrae, by bifurcating from existing two other Apostolic Vicariates, Kottayam (in Changanasserry) and Trichur. Mar Aloysius Pazheparambil was appointed as the first Apostolic Vicar, who assumed charge on 5 November 1896. Mar Pazheparampil governed the Vicariate until he died in 1919, and Augustine Kandathil was appointed the bishop the same year.

Archbishop Kandathil guided the life and work of the archdiocese and of the Syro-Malabar Hierarchy for well over three decades. The Syro-Malabar Hierarchy was established in 1923, and Ernakulam was raised to the Metropolitan status or Archdiocesan status, and Augustine Kandathil was made the first archbishop and Head of Syro-Malabar Church. Ernakulam was raised as the See of Syro-Malabar Church in 1923. Mar Augustine Kandathil served the archdiocese until his death in January 1956.

On 20 July 1956, Joseph Parecattil became the Archbishop of Ernakulam. On 29 July 1956, Ernakulam was bifurcated and the Diocese of Kothamangalam was erected. The dioceses of Thrissur, Thalassery and Kothamangalam became suffragan dioceses of Ernakulam archdiocese. Parecattil became a Cardinal on 28 March 1969, and Sebastian Mankuzhikary was appointed as his auxiliary on 15 November 1969. A large number of churches, monasteries, convents, seminaries, schools, colleges, technical institutions, printing presses, hospitals, homes for retired priests, social centres and various associations and institutes dedicated to intellectual and vocational apostolates came into being in this archdiocese during Cardinal Parecattil's tenure.

On 1 April 1984, Joseph Parecattil retired from the office, and Sebastian Mankuzhikary was designated as the apostolic administrator of the archdiocese. In the year 1985, Antony Padiyara was appointed as Archbishop of Ernakulam archdiocese and thereby the third Head of Syro-Malabar Church. Antony Padiyara was made Cardinal in 1988 and Mar Jacob Mananthodath became the auxiliary bishop of the archdiocese in 1992. On 16 December 1992 the Syro-Malabar Church was declared a major archiepiscopal church with the title of Ernakulam-Angamaly, by Pope John Paul II. Thereby the Archbishop of Ernakulam-Angamaly is also the Major Archbishop of the Syro-Malabar Church, and the name of the archdiocese changed from Ernakulam to Ernakulam-Angamaly. Angamaly, an ancient residential see of the Bishop of St Thomas Christians and now a municipal town in the Archdiocese of Ernakulam, was also associated with the title of the Major Archbishop. During this period, the powers of Major Archbishop were vested in the Pontifical Delegate Mar Abraham Kattumana (1992-1995). Major Archbishop Antony Padiyara retired from his office on 18 December 1996.

On 6 January 1997, Varkey Vithayathil C.Ss.R. was nominated titular Bishop of Antinoe and the Apostolic Administrator of the archdiocese. Thomas Chakiath was made auxiliary bishop of Ernakulam-Angamaly in February 1998. On 23 December 1999, the Vatican appointed archbishop Varkey Vithayathil as Major Archbishop of the Syro-Malabar Church. Sebastian Adayantharath was appointed Auxiliary Bishop of Ernakulam-Angamaly by Pope John Paul II on 3 January 2002. Bosco Puthur was appointed as Curia Bishop of Ernakulam-Angamaly on 15 January 2010.

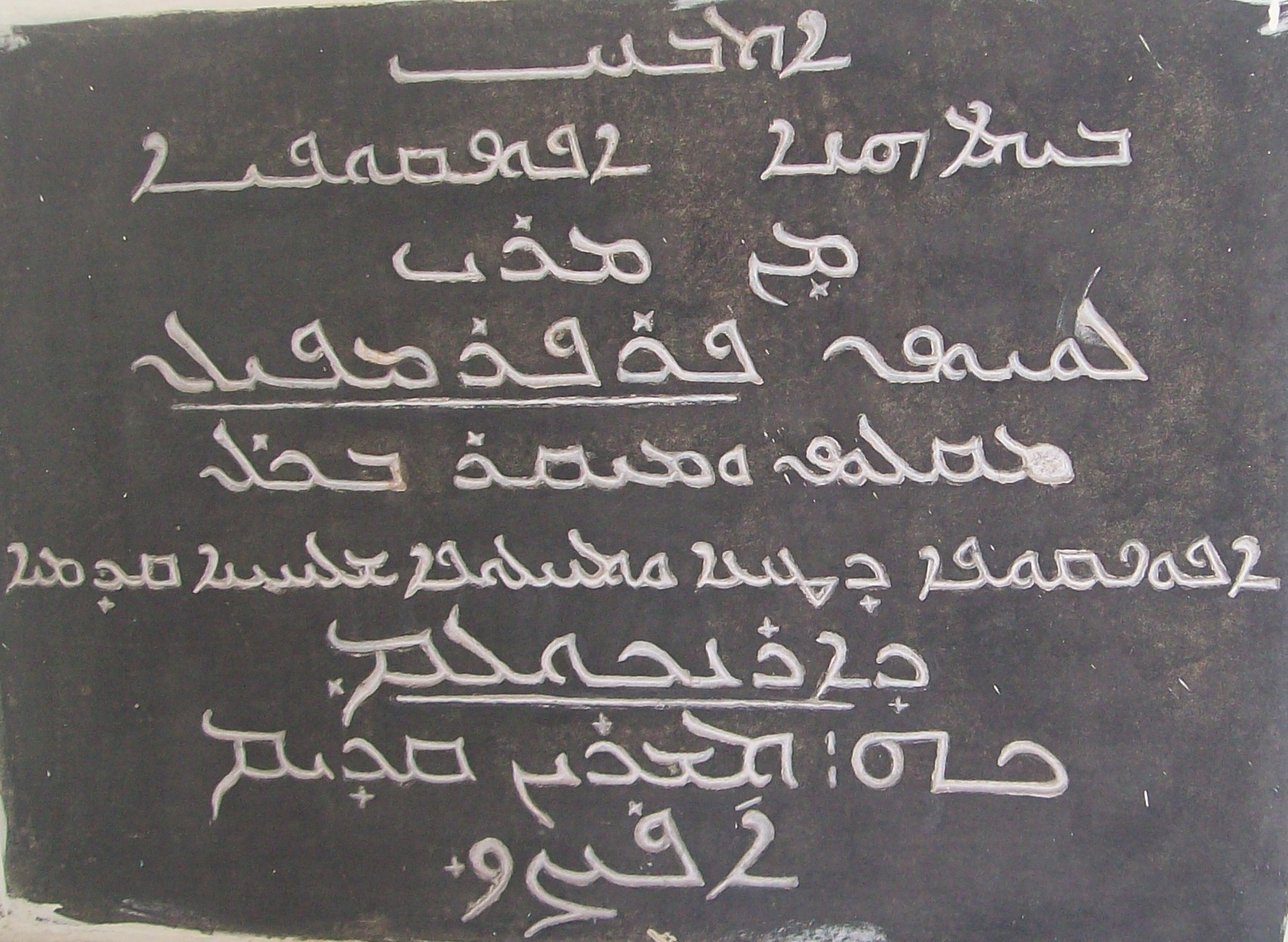
Syriac inscription at Syro-Malabar Catholic Major Archbishop's House, Ernakulam

On 1 April 2011, Varkey Vithayathil died. Bosco Puthur was apostolic administrator until installation of new Major Archbishop. On 24 May 2011, George Alencherry was elected as the major archbishop and installed on 29 May. Former Mandya Bishop Antony Karayil was appointed on 30 August 2019 as the Vicar of the Major Archbishop.

On 18 February 2012, Alencherry was made a cardinal of the Catholic Church.

In 2017, Alencherry was involved in a controversy involving improper transfers of archdiocesan property. Following protests from priests of the archdiocese, an acting administrator was named, who was eventually replaced by a permanent Archiepiscopal Vicar, Mar Antony Kariyil. In 2022, Kariyil was asked to step down by the Vatican following a dispute with the Syro-Malabar Synod when Kariyil refused to bring liturgical practices in the archdiocese into conformance with the norms set down by the Synod, instead of practices which had been in use for 60 years.

== Carmelite missionaries and the Syriac Vicariates ==
The concordat between the Holy See and Portugal was signed on 23 June 1886, to settle the Padroado problem. According to the concordat, Varapuzha had to leave some of her churches under the re-established Padroado diocese of Kochi. In 1887, 180,000 Syriac Rite Catholics were also separated from Varapuzha. Before the concordat and the separation of the Suriani Catholics, Varapuzha had 90,000 Latins and 180,000 Catholics of Syriac Rite. Now Varapuzha would remain with 29,081 faithful. In Leonardo Mellano's own words, "… this archdiocese of Varapuzha would be in such a miserable state, not to say ridiculous, that it would be better for it to be changed into only an apostolic prefecture." Mellano tried to get some more faithful under him. The first attempt was to get Alappuzha and Poongavu Latin parishes, telling that the Christians of those two parishes belonged to a different caste from those of the other surrounding churches. The Ezhunooticar who had been assigned to the diocese of Kochi wrote petitions to Rome requesting that they again be placed under Varapuzha. As the decree for the division of the Suriani Catholics from the Latins reached the apostolic delegate Aiuti, he invited Fr. Mani Nidiry to Ootty. Remaining there for some days Nidiry prepared the translation of the decree. Aiuti's act of publishing the new disposition of the Holy see regarding the Syriac Rite Catholics through the priors of the Syriac Carmelites of Elthuruth and Mannanam instead of through their local superior to whom they belonged until then was unbearable for Mellano. The reaction of the Carmelites had started manifesting itself in different ways. Wherever they found it possible to make use of the division among the Syriac Rite Catholics, they turned it around to suit their purpose and the different factions of Suriani Christians, knowingly or unknowingly, started pleading for Carmelites and for a separate vicariate under them. When the separation of the Syriac Rite Catholics from the Latins became a reality, the Suddists began to send petitions to Rome in favour of the Carmelites. Congregation informed Mellano through Aiuti, the impossibility to erect a third vicariate exclusively for the Suddists. Mellano did not favour a separate administration for the 200,000 faithful with 172 parishes and 360 priests, insisted for separate administration for 15–20,000 people with 12 parishes and 21 priests, on condition that it would be entrusted to a Carmelite bishop. When this attempt failed, a new endeavour began. Medlycott seems to have had some information regarding the scheming pro-Carmelite priests, as stated in a petition for the third vicariate. He asked Lavigne to take action with their leader Fr. Varghese Valiaveettil, who was then professor of Puthenpally seminary and whose local ordinary was Lavigne. Lavigne decided to remove him from the seminary, gave him the order to leave and to reside in the Arakuzha church as assistant. He sent the petitions in the name of more than thirty priests from the central part of the Malabar coast who formed Nadumissam kakshi. They requested that a third vicariate be formed in the centre of the Kottayam and Thrissur vicariates, with the possibility of entrusting it to bishop Marcelline OCD who remained without assignment. They envisaged the restoration of the ancient see of Ankamaly to form the third vicariate in the centre. Propaganda requested them to be obedient to the dispositions taken by the Pope. Later Zaleski, the delegate apostolic reproached Valiaveetil declaring that an attempt for a third vicariate would be considered as an act of insubordination to the Holy See and that the first time he would cause an upheaval, he would certainly be suspended. By this admonition the attempt for the third vicariate came to an end. Fr. Candid OCD, the vicar general of Varapuzha presented a special project to reunite the schismatics and the rebellious of the apostolic vicariate of Kottayam, but this project did not meet with the approval of Zaleski. Fr. Boniface OCD, rector of the inter-ritual seminary of Puthenpally, suggested to form a Syriac Rite Catholic hierarchy creating an archbishop and two bishops, of course all Europeans but would have adopted the Suriani rite. Zaleski presented this project before the congregation and suggested to make Boniface himself the metropolitan archbishop. The congregation believed that this proposal would be insufficient to suppress the movement to have autochthonous bishops.

== Kottayam vicariate ==
The Suriani Catholics south of the river Aluva were placed under the vicariate of Kottayam, one of the important cities in the kingdom of Thiruvithamcoor. There were 12,000 inhabitants according to the 1881 census; Catholics numbered around 300. Kottayam was the centre of the Syriac Orthodox Christians and this was one of the main reasons to select Kottayam as the residence of the apostolic vicar. Charles Louis Lavigne, was born on 6 January 1840 in France. He was ordained priest in 1864 and later he became a Jesuit. He received episcopal consecration on 13 November 1887 at Marvejols, his native place. When he reached Mannanam, there were 25 to 30 thousand people with two elephants to receive him. The schism was almost extinct in the Kottayam vicariate except for Elamthottam, where Mar Oudeesho (formerly Fr. Antony Thondanatt) stayed. Although the schism was ended a large number of present Syro Malabarians in Shertallai taluk entered their community as Chaldeans in the census of Travancore held at 1901. Lavigne planned a systematic development of the vicariate, building a college, a seminary, bishop's residence and schools and orphanages all of which required an enormous amount of money. Though the Suriani Carmelites of Mannanam treated him well, he naturally wanted to have a residence for the apostolic vicar. A college to prepare the students for the public examination was an urgent need. Lavigne was interested in the reunion movements. In April 1888, Lavigne went to Ootty at the apostolic delegation with Mar Dionysius, the Jacobite metropolitan and Fr. Nidiry. The Suriani Christians both Catholic and non-Catholics, were divided from time immemorial into two sections: Nordists and Suddists [Vadakkumbhagar & Thekkumbhagar] As the separation of the Suriani Catholics from Latins was effected, the question of this division came into serious discussion for the first time. Most of the Suddist priests wanted to remain under Varapuzha. Mathew Makil, along with Nordist Varghese Valiaveettil (Vazhakulam, Muvattupuzha) went to Ootty to meet Aiuti as representatives of the apostolic vicar of Varapuzha. In Ootty, Makil submitted a petition of the Suddists as their representative to Aiuti. There were 15 to 20,000 Suddists with 12 parishes and 21 priests and 100–109,000 Nordists with 133 parishes and 256 priests. The general picture of the vicariate in 1888 was as follows: Suriani Catholics 107,000; Priests 271; Seminarians 190; churches 96; chapels 49; seminary: besides the common seminary at Puthenpally there was one exclusively for the Syriac Rite Christians at Mannanam; religious men: 69; religious houses 5; Religious women: 25; religious houses 1, secondary schools 5 & primary schools 200. A petition of ten parish priests of the Suddist community dated 21 November 1887, requested the Pope to place them under Mellano or his coadjutor Marcellinos. Even before the arrival of Lavigne, the division was clear in Malabar, and from Lavigne's very reception he had to face the division. During the reception the Suddists requested him for an occasion to read a special address after the official one. Lavigne agreed to do this on the following day. Aiuti and Lavigne found the only solution to resolve the problem forever was to give a separate administration for the Suddists. Aiuti had already informed Propaganda that the project for a separate vicariate for the Suddists was designed by archbishop Mellano and Carmelites of Varapuzha. Following Aiuti's proposals, the general assembly of Propaganda Fide decided to give a separate administration granting them a vicar general and two councilors. Thus though Mellano could not attain his objective, i.e., a special vicariate for the Suddists, his strategy proved to have a bad effect, the growth of a division among the Suriani Catholics. Mellano was vehemently opposed to the separate administration of the 200,000 Suriani Catholics, including 360 priests, 213 seminarians and 59 religious priests, in 172 parishes. He wanted to erect a third vicariate for the Suddists who numbered 15–20,000, with 21 priests and 12 parishes.

== Thrissur vicariate ==
Malayattoor, Kaanjoor, Koratty, Moozhikkulam, Muringoor, Angamaly, Alengad, Paravoor (Kottakkavu), Njarackal and Mangalapuzha (Aluva) were part of Thrissur Vicariate before the formation of Ernakulam Archdiocese.

== Suffragans ==
- Eparchy of Idukki
- Eparchy of Kothamangalam

== Prelates ==
Archbishop Salvatore Pennacchio, Apostolic Nuncio to India, displays a gift from Pope Benedict XVI at the installation of Major Archbishop Alencherry.

Apostolic Vicar

Sl.no	Name	Designation	Year of appointment	Last year of service
1	Aloysius Pazheparambil	Apostolic Vicar	11 August 1896	8 December 1919

Archbishops

Sl.no	Name	Designation	Year of appointment	Last year of service
1	Augustine Kandathil	Archbishop	8 December 1919	10 January 1956
2	Joseph Parecattil	Archbishop	20 July 1956	30 January 1984
3	Antony Padiyara	Archbishop	23 April 1985	16 December 1992

Major Archbishops

Sl.no	Name	Designation	Year of appointment	Last year of service
1	Antony Padiyara	Major Archbishop	16 December 1992	11 November 1996
2	Varkey Vithayathil	Major Archbishop	23 December 1999	1 April 2011
3	George Alencherry	Major Archbishop	25 May 2011	7 December 2023
4	Raphael Thattil	Major Archbishop	9 January 2024	present

Pontifical delegates

Sl.no	Name	Designation	Year of appointment	Last year of service
1	Abraham Kattumana	Pontifical Delegate	1992	1995
2	Cyril Vasiľ	Pontifical Delegate	2023	2025

Apostolic administrators

Sl.no	Name	Designation	Year of appointment	Last year of service
1	Sebastian Mankuzhikary	Apostolic administrator (sede vacante)	1984	1985
2	Varkey Vithayathil	Apostolic administrator (sede vacante)	1996	1998
3	Jacob Manathodath	Apostolic administrator (sede plena)	2018	2019
4	Andrews Thazhath	Apostolic administrator (sede plena)	2022	2023
5	Bosco Puthur	Apostolic administrator (sede plena)	2023	2025

Vicar's For Major Archbishop

Sl.no	Name	Designation	Year of appointment	Last year of service
1	Antony Kariyil	Vicar of the Major Archbishop	2019	2022
2	Joseph Pamplany	Vicar of the Major Archbishop	2025	present

Auxiliary Bishops

Ordinary	Designation	Year of appointment	Last year of service
Augustine Kandathil	Auxiliary Bishop	1911	1919
Joseph Parecattil	Auxiliary Bishop	1953	1956
Sebastian Mankuzhikary	Auxiliary Bishop	1969	1986
Jacob Manathodath	Auxiliary Bishop	1992	1996
Thomas Chakiath	Auxiliary Bishop	1998	2012
Sebastian Adayanthrath	Auxiliary Bishop	2002	2019
Jose Puthenveetil	Auxiliary Bishop	2013	2019

Prelates Hailing from the Archdiocese

Ordinary	Designation	Year of appointment	Last year of service
Joseph Kariattil	Archbishop of Cranganore	1783	1786
Jhon menachery	Bishop of Thrissur	1896	1919
Jonas Thaliath C.M.I	Former Bishop of Rajkot	1977	1981
Sebastian Mankuzhikary	Former Bishop of Thamarassery	1986	1994
Januarius Palathuruthy C.M.I	Former Bishop of Chanda	1977	1995
Gratian Mundadan C.M.I	Former Bishop of Bijnor	1972	2009
Dominic Kokkat C.S.T	Former Bishop of Gorakhpur	1984	2006
Jacob Manathodath	Former Bishop of Palakkad	1997	2022
Paul Maipan	Former Bishop of Khammam	1997	2022
Joseph Chennoth	Apostolic Nuncio	1999	2020
Kuriakose Bharanikulangara	Bishop of Faridabad	2012	2025
Jose Chittooparambil CMI	Bishop of Rajkot	2010	present
Paul Mattekkatt	Bishop of Diphu	2013	present
Varghese Thottamkara	Bishop of Nekemte	2013	present
Ephrem Nariculam	Bishop of Chanda	2014	present
Sebastian Adayanthrath	Bishop of Mandya	2019	present
Jose Puthenveetil	Auxiliary Bishop of Faridabad	2019	present
Jose Chirackal	Auxiliary Bishop of Tura	2020	present
Kuriakose Bharanikulangara	ArchBishop of Faridabad	2025	Present

== Congregations and institutions ==
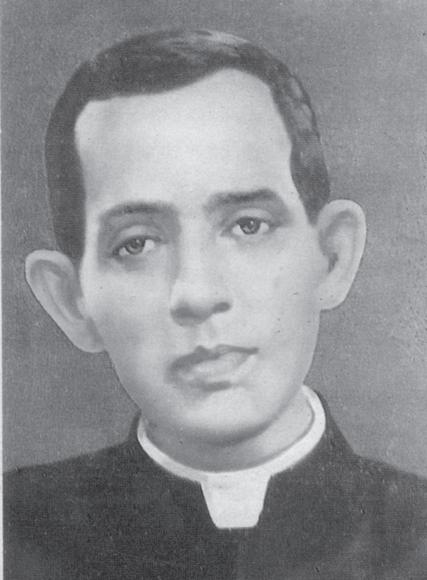
Mar Varghese Payyappilly Palakkappilly, A Venerable from the major archeparchy

Generalates of the four major religious congregations for men of the Syro-Malabar Church, namely the Carmelites of Mary Immaculate (C.M.I.), the Vincentian Congregation (V.C.), the Congregation of Saint Thérèse of Lisieux (C. S. T.), and the Missionary Congregation of the Blessed Sacrament (M.C.B.S.) and the only Syro-Malabar Provincialate of the Order of Friars Minor Capuchins, and the two Syro-Malabar Vice Provincialates of Franciscan Conventuals and of the Redemptorist Fathers and of the Claretians are situated in the Archdiocese of Ernakulam.

There are 11 college centers, 12 parallel colleges, 7 nursing schools and near to two hundred schools under the archdiocese. The archdiocese also manages near to 31 hospitals and 170 orphanages. The biggest Pontifical Seminary in the world, the Pontifical Institute of Theology and Philosophy, is in Alwaye, and run by the Kerala Catholic Bishops' Council.

== Historical places ==
The archdiocese has several places of historical significance to the Syro Malabar Church and the St. Thomas Christian community.

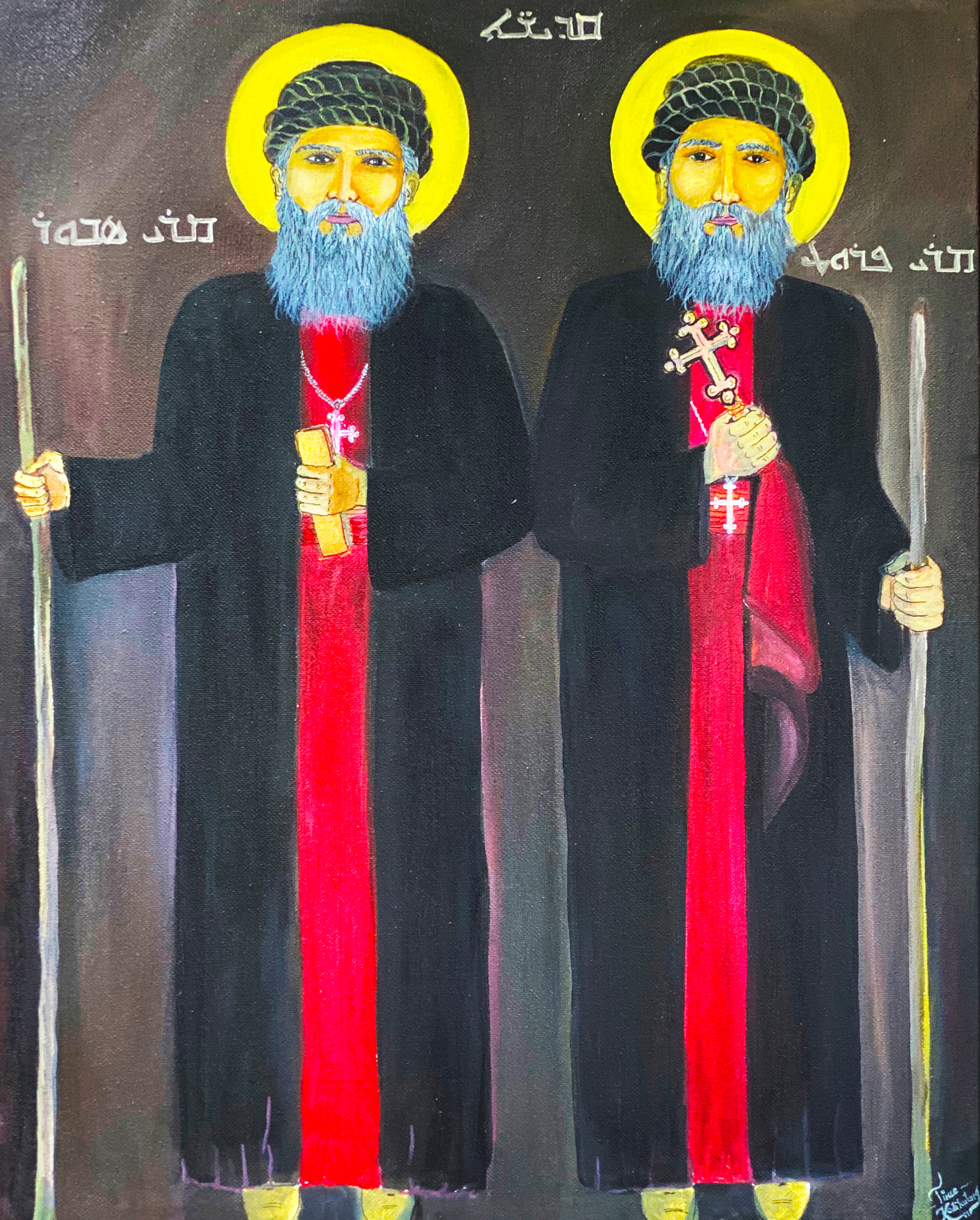
Mar Sabor and Mar Proth

The ancient port of Muziris, the earlier gateway to India for traders from Middle East is in the borders of Ernakulam and Thrissur districts. Diamper (Udayamperoor), where the famous Synod convoked by Dom Menezes, Archbishop of Goa (1599) took place is in Ernakulam Archdiocese. According to tradition, a session of the Synod of Diamper was conducted in Edapally. Chendamangalam known for the ancient Vaippincotta Seminary of the Jesuits, Puthenpally where the Spanish Carmelites conducted a seminary for the Syro-Malabar clergy are within the boundaries of Ernakulam Archdiocese.

Many places which are believed to be associated with the coming of St. Thomas are in this diocese. Kottekkavu (N. Parur) and Kokkamangalam / Pallippuram (Cherthala) are two places where St Thomas established churches in the first century. It's believed that St. Thomas used to frequently come for meditation and prayers in the hills of Malayattoor.

== Notable churches ==
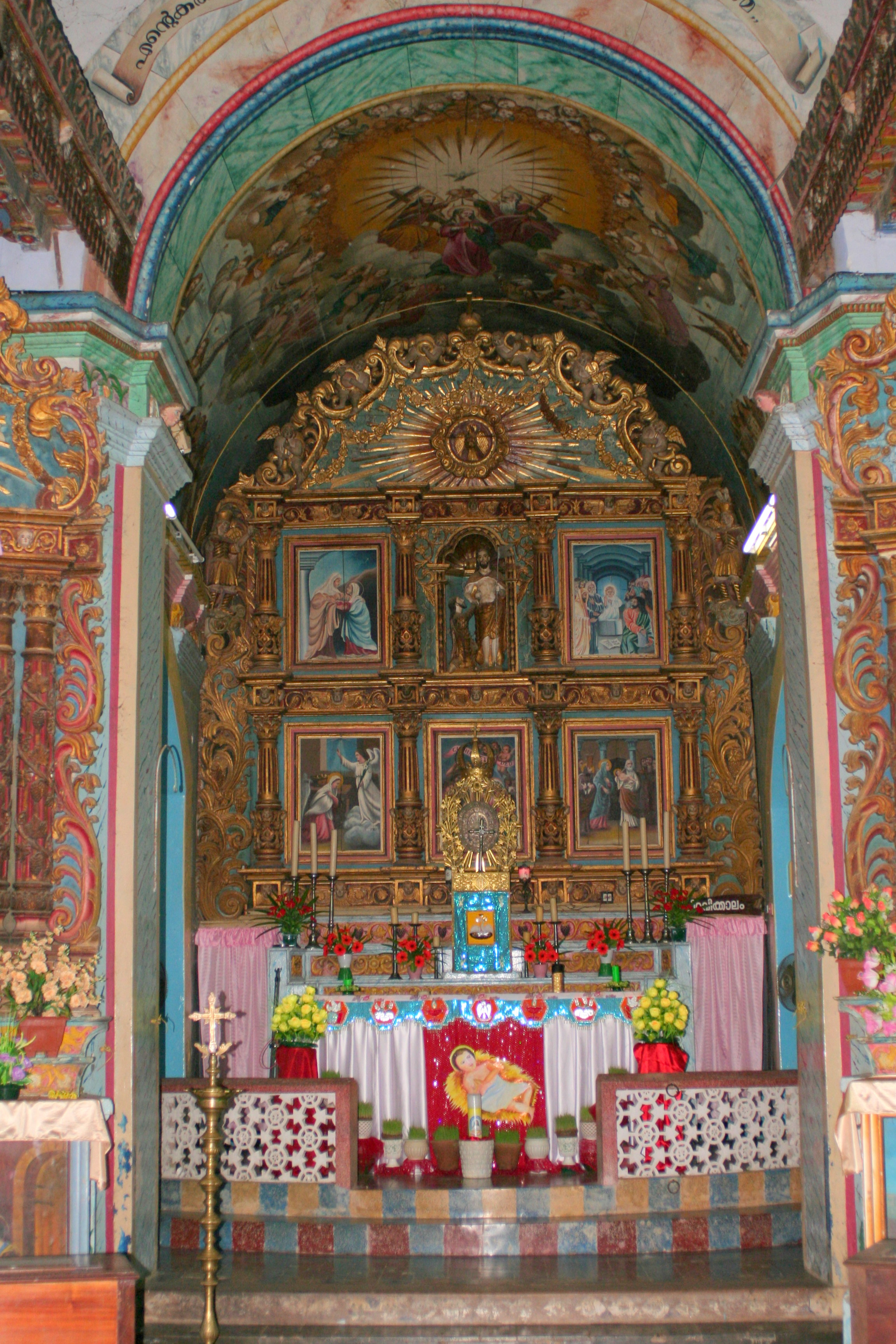
Interior of Malayattoor church

=== St. Thomas Syro-Malabar Catholic Church, Malayattoor ===
International Shrine of Kurisumudy is a mountain at Maiayattoor, 1269 'Ft. above sea level. Kurisumudy has its fame as a place visited by St. Thomas, one of the Apostles of Jesus Christ. Jesus gave a mandate to his Apostles to go out to the whole world and to proclaim the Good News. Taking upon himself this commandment, Thomas set out to India and landed at Kodungalloor in AD 52. He spent 20 years in India travelled through different parts of this great country of spirituality. He founded seven communities of believers which were Kodungailoor, Palayoor, Kottakavu, Kokkamangalam, Chayal, Kollam, and Niranam. Upon his visit to India St. Thomas visited Kurisumudy too. His missionary expeditions took him far and wide and while travelling through the famous caravan route from Kodugalioor to Madras St. Thomas came to Malayattoor. A hostile reception was in store and his life was in danger. He was forced to flee to the top of the mountain and he spent days together in prayer. According to the ‘Ramban Paattu’, St. Thomas went up the mountain to converse with the Lord. In deep anguish and agony, St. Thomas prayed to the Lord and he made a sign of the cross on the rock. The Mother Of Our Lord, Blessed Mary, appeared to console and strengthen him. He descended from the top hill. His zeal for the Lord took him to Mylappoor in Chennai and later died a martyr's death in AD 72. The locals began a practice of lighting an oil lamp and whenever the lamp gave in for the wind, a herd of goats came down wailing and people used to climb the mountain and light the lamp again. Pilgrims, who climb the mountain, even today carry with them seasamum seeds to feed the goats, even though goats are a rare sight.

=== St. Mary's Syro-Malabar Catholic Cathedral Basilica, Ernakulam ===
St. Mary's Syro-Malabar Catholic Cathedral Basilica, Ernakulam, is a cathedral in Kerala, India. Founded in 1112, the cathedral is also known by the names Nasrani Palli, Suriyani Palli Anchukaimal Palli or Thekke Palli. The church is the headquarters of the Major Archeparchy of Ernakulam–Angamaly, which is the episcopal see of the Syro-Malabar Church.

=== Kottakkavu Mar Thoma Syro-Malabar Pilgrim Church, North Paravur ===
St. Thomas, who reached Kerala in AD 52, brought Christianity to India. The Kottakavu Church is said to be one of the seven churches founded by him. In the 19th century, due to the lack of space in the old church for conducting Holy Mass and community functions, the new church was built.

=== St. George Syro-Malabar Catholic Basilica, Angamaly ===
It is recorded that the first church of Angamally built in 450, was the St. George Forane Church (Basilica), which was originally dedicated to St. Mary (until the Synod of Diamper). The dedication to St. George was due to presence of a chapel, which was dedicated to St. George. For a long period following the Synod of Diamper, both the Syro-Malabar Catholics and the Jacobites conducted their services in this Church in a cordial manner.

=== St. Mary's Forane Church, Pallippuram, Cherthala ===
St. Mary's Forane Church Pallippuram is a Marian Pilgrim Center located in Cherthala, Alleppey district, Kerala. It was the first church in Asia in the name of Our Lady of Assumption. It is believed that the church is established in 52 AD. It was one of the divisions of Kottayam vicariate before the formation of Ernakulam vicariate. Today, it is a Forane church of Ernakulam - Angamaly Archdiocese of Syro - Malabar Rite. This church is the mother of many churches in Cherthala and Vaikom Taluks.

=== St. George Syro-Malabar Catholic Forane Church, Edappally ===
St George Forane Church, popularly known as Edappally church, is situated in Edappally, which is about 10 km from Cochin. This Syro-Malabar Catholic Church is one of the oldest churches in Kerala built in 594 AD. The patron of this church, St. George is said to have the power of getting rid of snakes. Every year, a grand nine-day festival is celebrated here in the month of April - May. The church is also quite popular amongst the non-Christians, who also come here for veneration.

=== Mar Hormiz Syro-Malabar Catholic Church, Angamaly ===
It is the former cathedral of Angamaly- Kodungalloor Archeparchy of Saint Thomas Christians.

== Controversies ==
=== Dispute over uniform mode of celebrating Mass ===
The St. Mary's Syro Malabar Cathedral Basilica in Ernakulam controversy reflects a deep-rooted conflict over liturgical practices, highlighting the Syro-Malabar Church's struggle between tradition and uniformity. It centers around a dispute over the implementation of a uniform mode of celebrating Holy Mass in the Arch-Diocese of Ernakulam Angamaly (The only Arch Diocese among a total of 5 Arch Diocese's that refused to implement this directive), as decreed by the Synod of the Syro-Malabar Church and approved by the Holy See for implementation by Easter 2022. Adding to the origins of the dispute at St. Mary's Cathedral Basilica in Ernakulam, Archbishop Mar Antony Kariyil's tenure and resignation further exemplify the complexity of the issue. Appointed against the backdrop of a revolt and favored locally over the Vatican's choice of Archbishop Mar George Alencherry (Major Archbishop Mar George Alencherry faced criticism for his role in controversial land transactions, which reportedly led to significant financial losses for the Ernakulam-Angamaly Archdiocese. He resigned on 7th December 2023), his leadership and subsequent resignation on 26 July 2022 under Vatican pressure reflect the ongoing struggle between traditional autonomy and centralized ecclesiastical directives within the church.

The Basilica witnessed the dispute take a violent turn on 28 November 2022 when Archbishop Mar Andrews Thazhath, who was supposed to conduct the uniform mass as per prior assurance by then Archdiocese Metropolitan Vicar Mar Antony Kariyil (Kariyil had earlier agreed along with the priests to move to uniform mode before December 25th, 2022 as per Pope Francis Directives communicated back in April 2022), was blocked at the gates by the Vicars supporters (Athirupatha Samrakshana Samithi and Almaya Munnetta Samithi). The situation escalated with the group locking the gate, preventing the archbishop's entry. To avoid further conflict, the archbishop returned without conducting the mass, and the vicar of the Basilica later held the mass in the old format. This incident initially led to the temporary closure of the Basilica by police.

Plans for reopening in June 2023 faced setbacks due to ongoing disagreements. The reopening of the Basilica was initially approved conditionally by the Special Synod. However, the Basilicas vicar and trustees retracted their agreement to only celebrate the Unified Holy Mass, leading to further continuation of the Basilicas closure. It was reopened by Archbishop Cyril Vasil, appointed by the Vatican to address the Ernakulam-Angamaly archdiocese dispute, on 16 August 2023 under heavy police protection and protests.

On 17 August 2023, Archbishop Cyril Vasil, ordered all parishes to follow the uniform mass format, with non-compliance risking excommunication. This directive came despite resistance in Ernakulam-Angamaly, where many, led by priests and groups such as Athirupatha Samrakshana Samithi (Arch Diocese Protection Group) and Almaya Munnetta Samithi, formed by former Vicar Mar Antony Kariyil (now retired), protested against the order by burning the Vatican special emissaries order. By the time the directive was issued 2,902 out of the 3,224 Syro Malabar parishes across Kerala's 35 dioceses & 5 Archdioceses had already complied with the uniform mass format.

On 18 August 2023, Almaya Munnetta Samithi claiming to represent all parishioners from the Ernakulam-Angamaly Archdiocese and its 328 dioceses petitioned Indian President Droupadi Murmu, seeking the deportation of Papal delegate Archbishop Cyril Vasil, citing interference in local church affairs. Vasil's visit to Kochi aimed to resolve disputes over the uniform Holy Mass implementation. The petition, by Almaya Munnetta Samiti, alleges Vasil's actions violate India's sovereignty and demands legal action. The controversy has led to significant dissent and protests, including Vasil's forced entry into St Mary's Cathedral and the appointment of a new administrator, exacerbating tensions. The organization criticizes the Kerala government's support for Vasil, deeming it unconstitutional. They have made similar representations to Prime Minister Narendra Modi, Home Minister Amit Shah and External Affairs Minister S Jaishankar.

On 7 December 2023, In a slightly unusual move Pope Francis reached out directly to the faithful of the Syro-Malabar community in Ernakulam in an open video message, to be clear of his direct involvement and understanding of the issue. Pope Francis set a Christmas deadline for the Ernakulam-Angamaly Archdiocese to resolve its liturgical dispute, emphasizing unity and warning against sectarianism. He urged the Arch-Diocese to embrace diversity without becoming a sect, reflecting on the potential of diversity to enrich rather than divide. "In the name of the Lord, for the spiritual good of your church, of our church, I ask you to heal this rupture. It is your church; it is our church. Restore communion; remain in the Catholic Church," the pope said in the video.

On Monday, 10 December 2023, Syro Malabar Church issued an ultimatum to the dissenting priests of the Ernakulam-Angamaly Archdiocese to follow the Uniform Mass, as decreed by the Synod of the Syro-Malabar Church and approved by the Holy See, by 3 July, the St Thomas Day or face expulsion from the Catholic church. According to the circular, priests who do not comply be considered laicized. These priests will not be allowed to perform sacraments, including the sacrament of marriage and believers are advised not to attend their services as it will not be considered valid by the Church. The circular was jointly issued by the Major Archbishop Mar Raphael Thattil and Apostolic Administrator of the archdiocese Mar Bosco Puthur. The circular further extended the directive to Syro-Malabar priests from the Ernakulam-Angamaly Archdiocese serving in other dioceses or pursuing higher studies. These priests must submit a written commitment, by 3 July, to the Apostolic Administrator, assuring they will comply with the Synod's rulings. Failure to submit this undertaking within the timeframe will result in a ban on performing priestly duties. Additionally, the higher authorities of their respective institutions will be informed for potential disciplinary actions. This circular is to be read in all churches of the Archdiocese on Sunday, 16 June.

== Saints and causes for canonisation ==
- Blessed Rani Maria
- Ven. Varghese Payyappilly
- Servant of God Joseph C. Panjikaran
- Servant of God Mary Celine Payyappilly
- Servant of God Fr. Varkey Kattarath, VC
- Servant of God Fr. Joseph Kandathil

== See also ==
- List of Major Archbishops of Ernakulam-Angamaly
- Ernakulam Priests' Revolt
- St. Jude Church, Karanakodam
