= Thomas Chakiath =

Mar Thomas Chakiath ܡܵܪܝ ܬܐܘܿܡܐܵ ܐܲܦܸܣܩܘܿܦܵܐ
- Auxiliary Bishop Emeritus of Ernakulam-Angamaly; Titular Bishop of Uzippari
- See: Ernakulam-Angamaly

Orders
- Ordination: 1 December 1964
- Consecration: 14 April 1998

Personal details
- Born: 10 September 1937 Moonnamparambu, Karukutty, Ernakulam District, Kerala, India
- Denomination: Syro-Malabar Catholic Church

Thomas Chakiath ܡܵܪܝ ܬܐܘܿܡܐܵ ܐܲܦܸܣܩܘܿܦܵܐ (born 10 September 1937) is a retired Syro Malabar Catholic Bishop. He was the Auxiliary Bishop of the Archdiocese of Ernakulam-Angamaly.

== Biography ==
He is the son of Chackappan and Mariam Chakiath. He attended the Sacred Heart Petit Seminary, Ernakulam and then the Pontifical Seminary, Alwaye. Chakiath was ordained priest on 30 November 1964 at the Eucharistic Congress in Bombay by Joseph Cardinal Parecattil.

Chakiath is an alumnus of the Pontifical University of St. Thomas Aquinas Angelicum in Rome where he studied from 1968 to 1972 earning a doctorate in sociology. He was a member of the K.C.B.C. Commission for Justice and Peace, and the secretary of the priests’ Senate of the Archdiocese of Ernakulam. Chakiath has been a consulter of the Archdiocese for three terms. He was the founder-director of Niveditha, Institute for Religious Formation and Fellowship.

In January 1997, Chakiath was appointed the Vicar General of the Archdiocese of Ernakulam. On 17 February 1998 Chakiath was nominated the Titular Bishop of Uzipari and the Bishop Auxiliary of Ernakulam Angamaly. He was consecrated Bishop on 14 April 1998 by Archbishop Mar Varkey Vithayathil at St Mary's Cathedral Basilica, Ernakulam.
