= St. Jude Church, Karanakodam =

- St. Jude Church, Karanakodam
- 9.59°N 76.18°E
- Location: Thammanam, Ernakulam, Kerala
- Country: India
- Denomination: Syro-Malabar Catholic

History
- Status: Parish
- Consecrated: 1971

Architecture
- Functional status: Active
- Completed: 2010

Administration
- Archdiocese: Ernakulum – Angamali

St. Jude Church Karanakodam is a Syro-Malabar Catholic parish in Ernakulam, Kerala, India. It is a part of Archeparchy of Ernakulam–Angamaly. The parish church is situated Midway between Kathrikkadavu Junction and Thammanam Junction along the Thammanam Pullepady Road. The road opposite to the Church leads to the rear entry of the Jawaharlal Nehru International Stadium, Kaloor.

This is a small parish with 450 families, Rev. Fr. Thomas Mangalassery leads the parish. A seventeen-member parish council, trustees and vice chairman assists the vicar for smooth functioning of the parish.

== History ==
The parish is spread over two former princely kingdoms, namely Travancore and Kochi. The Ernakulam-Angamaly dioceses had lot of agricultural property in Travancore. But during the 1930–1940 period, the enmity between these two kingdoms was at its extremes and it was not possible to transport products from Travancore to Kochi. At this juncture, the great visionary and the architect of Ernakulum – Angamaly diocese, Bishop Mar Augustine Kandathil, purchased about 30 acres of waste land and developed it into fertile agricultural farms. Time passed by and the rules changed. Finally the diocese was left with only 5.46 acres of land. The present St Jude's Church and its adjacent St Catherine Convent and St Jude Nagar are part of this property.

The Syrian Catholic people in Karanakkodam, Thammanam, Kathrikadavu were part of basilica, Edapally, Chambakkara and Elamkulam Parishes, but they had no relations with those churches except for baptism, marriage and funeral ceremonies. For all other purposes they depended on the Latin churches of St Francis Church Kaloor and St John the Baptist Church Palarivattom. In 1970 Cardinal Joseph Parecattil decided to establish a new Syrian Catholic church at Karanakkodam and earmarked 2 acres of land, and entrusted the responsibility to the then-Procurator Rev Fr Jose Thachil to build the church. The auxiliary bishop Mar Sebastian Mankuzhikary laid the foundation stone for the church. Under the leadership of Fr. Thachil a small but beautiful church was constructed, and on 28 February 1971, Cardinal Parecattil blessed and dedicated it in the name of Saint Jude the Apostle, a name that was then uncommon.

== Present day ==
A majority of the parishioners hail from Changanassery, Palai, and Thrissur dioceses, and have deep-rooted faith. Almost 95% of the parishioners have migrated to Cochin and settled around this church.

One of the former parish priests, Fr Thachil, visited Europe and the Holy Land, and brought back A-class relics (Thirusheship) of St Jude from Rome. These were installed at the altar on 28 September 1978. The development of the church from then on went at a very fast pace.

On 28 February 1981, Cardinal Parecattil elevated St Jude's Church to St Jude's Parish. Also on this day he blessed the parish hall.

The initial church was small and could not accommodate all parishioners. A new church was constructed by extending the existing one. On 25 April 2010, Bishop Mar Sebastian Adiyanthriath blessed the new church.

== Milestones ==
1. Mariyan Sodality (now known as Catholic Living Concept – CLC) – 8 September 1973

2. Altar Boys – 16 August 1976

3. Vincent D Paul Society – 7 November 1976

4. "Marananathara Sahaya Fund" – 1 January 1979

5. "Mathru Sangam" – 10 May 1981

6. "Vivaha Sahaya Fund" – 15 August 1983

7. Parish Council – 1989.

8. KCYM – 1989

9. "Thiru Bala Sakhiyam" – January 1991

10. Parish Bullettin – 3 March 1991

11. Catechism Counsel – 26 July 1992

12. First St. Joseph's Feast – March 1993

13. Silver jubilee Calibrations of the church was inaugurated by Cardinal Antony Padiyara – 18 February 1995.

14. Kerala Catholic Congress – May 2015

== Vicars ==
- Rev Fr. Thomas Mangalassery (Present)
- Rev Fr Sebastian Urakkadan
- Rev.Fr. Job Koottungal
- Rev.Fr. Issac Damian Painumakal
- Rev.Fr. Paul Kavalakattu
- Rev.Fr. Sebastin Manickathan
- Rev.Fr. Kuriakose Mampilly
- Rev.Fr. Dr.jose Thachil
- Rev.Fr. Jose Mulavanal
- Rev.Fr. Jose Thachil
- Rev.Fr. Mathew Edasserry
- Rev.Fr. James Palliparambil
- Rev.Fr. Jose Nalpatt
- Rev.Fr. Jose Thachil

== Timings of Holy Mass ==
- Sunday: 6.30 AM,8.45AM,6.30 PM
- Week Days: 6.30 AM
- Thursday: 6.30 AM Holy Mass and Novena | 6.00 PM Holy Mass and Novena
- First Friday of every month 6.00 PM Mass and Adoration
- Everyday Mass is followed by Rosary and Sapra
