= Antony Padiyara =

Head of the Syro-Malabar Catholic Church from 1985 to 1996

Mar Mar Antony Padiyara ܡܸܛܪܵܦܘܿܠܝܼܛܵܐ ܘܬܲܪܐ ܕܟܠ ܗܸܢܕܘܿ
- Cardinal, Major Archbishop of Syro-Malabar Church
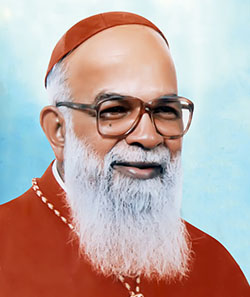
- Province: Metropolitan province of Ernakulam Angamaly
- Diocese: Ernakulam Angamaly
- See: Ernakulam-Angamaly
- Installed: 23 April 1985
- Term ended: 11 November 1996
- Predecessor: Mar Augustine Kandathil as the head of the Syro Malabar Church; Joseph Parecattil as the Archbishop of Ernakulam
- Successor: Mar Varkey Vithayathil
- Previous posts: Bishop of Ootacamund (1955–1970); Archbishop of Changanassery (1970–1985)

Orders
- Ordination: 19 December 1945
- Consecration: 3 July 1955
- Created cardinal: 28 June 1988
- Rank: Major Archbishop

Personal details
- Born: 11 February 1921 Manimala, Travancore
- Died: 23 March 2000 (aged 79) Kakkanad, Kerala, India
- Denomination: Syro-Malabar Catholic Church
Antony Padiyara Metropolitan Archbishop
- Metropolitan Archbishop of Changanassery
- Province: Metropolitan province of Changanassery
- Diocese: Changanassery
- Appointed: 14 Jun 1970
- Term ended: 23 Apr 1985
- Predecessor: Mathew Kavukattu
- Successor: Joseph Powathil
Antony Padiyara
- Bishop of Ootacamund
- Province: Latin Metropolitan province of Madras-Mylapore
- Diocese: Ootacamund
- Installed: 3 Jul 1955
- Term ended: 14 Jun 1970
- Predecessor: Post established
- Successor: Packiam Arokiaswamy

Ordination history of Antony Padiyara
History
Priestly ordination
- Date: 19 December 1945
Episcopal consecration
- Principal consecrator: Bishop René-Jean-Baptiste-Germain Feuga
- Co-consecrators: Francis Xavier Muthappa, Matthew Kavukattu
Episcopal succession
Bishops consecrated by Antony Padiyara as principal consecrator
- Archbishop James Masilamony Arul Das: 1974
- Januarius Paul Palathuruthy: 1977
- Gregory Karotemprel: 1983
- Paul Chittilapilly: 1988
- Archbishop George Valiamattam: 1989
- Vijay Anand Nedumpuram: 1990
- Archbishop Abraham Kattumana: 1991
- Jacob Manathodath: 1992
- Simon Stock Palathara: 1993

Antony Padiyara (11 February 1921 – 23 March 2000) was a Syro-Malabar Catholic cardinal and the first Major Archbishop of Ernakulam-Angamaly. Before serving as Major Archbishop from 1985 to 1996, he previously served as Bishop of Ootacamund (1955–1970) and Archbishop of Changanassery (1970–1985). He was elevated as cardinal in 1988.

== Biography ==
Born in Manimala, Travancore, Antony Padiyara got his primary education from SB English High School Changanasserry and later studied in St. Peter's Regional Seminary in Bangalore and was ordained to the priesthood on 19 December 1945. He was incardinated into the Latin Church Diocese of Coimbatore, where he served as curate at Peria Kodiveri and pastor at Kollegal and Ootacamund between 1946 and 1952. He became rector of the minor seminary in 1952 and a professor at St. Peter's Regional Seminary in 1954.

On 3 July 1955, Padiyara was appointed Bishop of Ootacamund by Pope Pius XII. He received his episcopal consecration on the following 16 October from Bishop René-Jean-Baptiste-Germain Feuga, with Bishop Francis Xavier Muthappa and Archbishop Matthew Kavukattu serving as co-consecrators. After attending the Second Vatican Council from 1962 to 1965, Padiyara returned to the Syro-Malabar Catholic Church. On 13 June 1970 he was promoted to Archbishop of Changanassery. He was elected Vice President of the Indian Episcopal Conference (1976), President of the Kerala Catholic Bishops' Council (1983), and President of the Syro-Malabar Bishops Conference (1984). In one of the acts of his short-lived papacy, Pope John Paul I named him Apostolic visitor to the Syro-Malabar Catholics in Kerala on 8 September 1978.

Padiyara was appointed Archbishop of Ernakulam-Angamaly by Pope John Paul II on 23 April 1985. He was created cardinal priest of S. Maria "Regina Pacis" a Monte Verde in the consistory of 28 June 1988. When the Archdiocese of Ernakulam-Angamaly was elevated to the rank of a major archdiocese on 16 December 1992, Padiyara became a Major Archbishop and thus head of the Syro-Malabar Catholic Church. During this period, the powers of Major Archbishop were also vested in the Pontifical Delegate Mar Abraham Kattumana (1992–1995). Within the Roman Curia, he was a member of the Congregation for the Oriental Churches and the Pontifical Commission for the Revision of the Code of Oriental Canon Law. After reaching the mandatory retirement age of 75, he resigned as Major Archbishop on 11 November 1996, after eleven years of service. He was awarded the Padma Shri in 1998.

He later died at the Cardinal Padiyara Nature Cure Centre in Kakkanad, which he himself had founded, aged 79. He is buried in St. Mary's Cathedral Basilica in Ernakulam.

Catholic Church titles
Preceded by Diocese Established	Bishop of Ootacamund; 1955–-1970	Succeeded by Packiam Arokiaswamy
Preceded by Mathew Kavukattu	Archbishop of Changanassery; 1970–-1985	Succeeded by Joseph Powathil
Preceded by Mar Sebastian Mankuzhikary	Major Archbishop of Ernakulam; 1985–-1996	Succeeded by Mar Varkey Vithayathil
