= Varkey Vithayathil =

Head of the Syro-Malabar Catholic Church from 1999 to 2011

Mar Varkey Vithayathil ܡܪ ܘܪܟܝ ܘܝܬܝܐܬܝܠ
- Major Archbishop; Cardinal
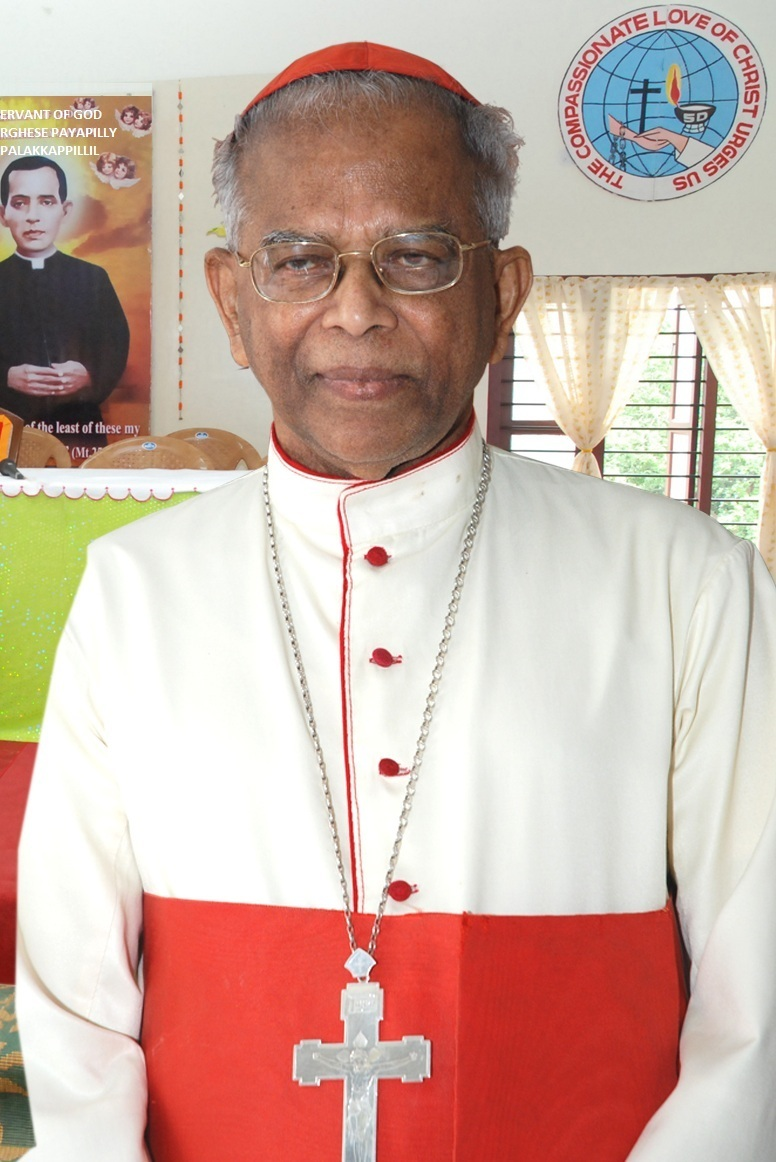
- Diocese: Ernakulam-Angamaly
- See: Ernakulam-Angamaly
- Predecessor: Antony Padiyara
- Successor: George Alencherry
- Other posts: Apostolic Administrator of the Benedictine Monastery in Bangalore (1990–1996); Cardinal-Priest of S. Bernardo alle Terme

Orders
- Ordination: 12 June 1954
- Consecration: 17 January 1997
- Created cardinal: 21 February 2001 by Pope John Paul II
- Rank: Cardinal-Priest of St. Bernardo alle Terme

Personal details
- Born: 29 May 1927 North Parur, Travancore
- Died: 1 April 2011 (aged 83) Ernakulam, Kerala, India
- Denomination: Syro-Malabar Catholic Church
- Parents: Mr. Joseph Vithayathil; Mrs. Thresiamma Manadan

Ordination history of Varkey Vithayathil
History
Priestly ordination
- Ordained by: Archbishop Thomas Pothacamury
- Date: 12 June 1954
Episcopal consecration
- Principal consecrator: Pope John Paul II
- Co-consecrators: Archbishop Giovanni Battista Re, Archbishop Miroslav Stefan Marusyn
- Date: 6 January 1997
Cardinalate
- Elevated by: Pope John Paul II
- Date: 21 January 2001
Episcopal succession
Bishops consecrated by Varkey Vithayathil as principal consecrator
- Emmanuel Mani Giles Pothanamuzhy: January 26, 1997
- Thomas Elavanal: November 11, 1997
- Thomas Chakiath: January 19, 1998
- Lawrence Mukkuzhy: August 4, 1999
- Joseph Kunnath, C.M.I.: October 6, 1999
- Matthew Vaniakizhakel, C.V.: April 12, 2000
- Jacob Angadiath: July 1, 2001
- Sebastian Adayanthrath: April 20, 2002
- Mathew Anikuzhikattil: March 2, 2003
- José Porunnedom: March 18, 2004
- Anthony Chirayath: March 25, 2006
- Thomas Thuruthimattam, C.S.T.: October 1, 2006
- Joseph Arumachadath, M.C.B.S.: August 29, 2007
- Bosco Puthur: January 18, 2010

Varkey Vithayathil CSsR (29 May 1927 – 1 April 2011) was an Indian cardinal who served as the Major Archbishop of the Syro-Malabar Catholic Church and Archeparchy of Ernakulam-Angamaly from 1999 to 2011. He was also a religious priest of the Congregation of the Most Holy Redeemer.

== Early life and ordination ==
Born to Joseph Vithayathil and Thresiamma Manadan in North Parur, Travancore, he became a member of the Congregation of the Most Holy Redeemer (Redemptorists), a religious congregation founded by Alphonsus Ligouri in 1732. He was ordained as a priest on 12 June 1954. He was granted a doctorate in canon law from the Pontifical University of St. Thomas Aquinas (Angelicum) in Rome on The Origin and Progress of the Syro-Malabar Hierarchy. He taught for 25 years at the Redemptorist seminary in Bangalore. In 1972 he took his master's degree in philosophy from Karnataka University. He also taught different subjects in several other seminaries in Bangalore.

== Provincial Superior ==
From 1978 to 1984 he was the Provincial Superior of the Redemptorist Provinces of India and Sri Lanka. Then, from 1984 to 1985 he was President of the India Conference of Religious. In 1990, he was appointed as the Apostolic Administrator of the Asirvanam Benedictine Monastery in Bangalore by Pope John Paul II.

== Metropolitan and Gate of all India ==
He was appointed Apostolic Administrator of Ernakulam-Angamaly on 11 November 1996 and was consecrated a bishop on 6 January 1997. Pope John Paul II appointed him as the Major Archbishop of Ernakulam-Angamaly and Head of the Syro-Malabar Catholic Church, on 23 December 1999. In February 2008 he was elected President of the Catholic Bishops Conference of India and held the presidency from 19 February 2008 to 3 March 2010.

== Cardinal ==
Pope John Paul II appointed Varkey Vithayathil a member of the Sacred College of Cardinals on 21 January 2001, and raised him to that dignity at the Consistory of 21 February 2001 becoming Cardinal-Priest of S. Bernardo alle Terme. He was one of the cardinal electors who participated in the 2005 papal conclave that elected Pope Benedict XVI.

== Sacerdotal golden jubilee ==
The sacerdotal golden jubilee of Cardinal Varkey Vithayathil was celebrated under the auspices of the Syro-Malabar church on 8 November 2003. The jubilee was inaugurated on 12 June 2003 and was concluded on 12 June 2004.

Varkey Vithayathil former Major Archbishop

== Opinions ==
=== Fifth Marian dogma ===
Varkey Vithayathil supported proposals to solemnly proclaim a fifth Marian dogma on the co-redemption and mediation of graces, saying it would be beneficial to the Church and that it would have positive ecumenical effects.

== Death ==
He died suddenly from a massive heart attack on 1 April 2011. He had suffered from prolonged heart problems for some time and died about 2:00 pm of sudden and irreversible cardiac arrest from the heart attack at Lisie Hospital in Ernakulam, where he had been hurriedly taken after fainting while celebrating Mass at noon in his chapel in the Major Archbishop's house, in Ernakulam. The funeral was held on 10 April 2011 at St. Mary's Cathedral Basilica, Ernakulam. Varkey himself did not have any children, obviously, but his brother's line still lives today, with the eldest grandchild of Varkey's brother, living in Mumbai, India, and the second grandchild, living in UK. as of 2017

== Works ==
- The Origin and Progress of the Syro-Malabar Hierarchy, Thesis, Angelicum, 1959. Published: Oriental Institute of Religious Studies, India, 1980.
- Straight From the Heart, autobiography and opinions in the form of an extended interview, 2009.

== Notes ==
Catholic Church titles
| Preceded by Cardinal Antony Padiyara / Pontifical Delegate Abraham Kattumana | Major Archbishop of Ernakulam; 1996–2011 | Succeeded by George Alencherry |
