= Ernakulam Priests' Rebellion =

The Ernakulam priests' revolt is a series of actions by the priests of the Syro-Malabar Catholic Major Archeparchy of Ernakulam–Angamaly, starting roughly from December 2017 and still continuing. The issue first came out as a land scam in December 2017 through social media. Priests from the Major Archdiocese gathered together in the archbishop's house and asked for the details of the land deals of the archeparchy. The synod of bishops of the Syro-Malabar Church assembled in January 2018 could not effectively deal with the situation. The priests of the diocese insisted on the deposition of Alencherry from his office of major archbishop. The church announced a commission under Fr. Benny Maramparambil to enquire about the allegations. The commission report was having very serious findings against Cardinal Alancherry. The report revealed that cardinal had violated canon rules to cause a very heavy damage to the church. Certain documents were forged to get the registration successful.

On 22 June 2018, the Roman Curia intervened and appointed Jacob Manathodath as apostolic administrator sede plena of the archeparchy, to study the case with an independent agency and submit the report. KPMG was appointed for a forensic audit. They came out with serious findings including fraudulent activities against Cardinal Alencherry. Prof. Injody was also appointed as a commission for enquiry into these deals. All these agencies found that the deals were not transparent and a lot of illegal acts were done in that deal. They revealed that a land document was forged to execute the deals. Canon laws and Civil laws were violated. The report was submitted to Rome.

As the duty of Bishop Manathodath was over Rome withdrew the administrator on 27 June 2019. The synod of bishops elected Antony Kariyil and appointed him as the vicar of the major archbishop for the archeparchy, with the approval of the Holy See, which granted him the personal title of archbishop. The suspended auxiliary bishops were given other appointments.

The Special Investigation Team of Kerala police has filed a charge sheet against four, including three priests, in the case of alleged forgery of documents to defame Cardinal George Alencherry, head of the Syro-Malabar Church.

The first accused is Father Antony Kallookaran of St Joseph Church, Karukutty. The second accused is Father Paul Thelakkat of Renewal Centre, Kaloor, and the third accused is Father Benny John Maramparambil of St Joseph Church, Kadavanthra. The fourth accused is Adithya Z Valavi of Konthuruthy.

During the probe, the police arrested only Adithya, a post graduate from Indian Institute of Technology. Fathers Kallookaran and Thelakkat avoided arrest by availing anticipatory bail from the Kerala High Court.
