= Kuriakose Bharanikulangara =

Syro-Malabar Archbishop

Mar Kuriakose Bharanikulangara ܡܵܪܝ ܩܘܼܪܝܵܩܘܿܤ ܒܲܪܲܢܝܼܟܘܼܠܲܢܓܲܪܲܐ ܡܝܼܛܪܵܦܘܿܠܹܝܛܵܐ
- Metropolitan Archbishop of Faridabad
- Archdiocese: Archeparchy of Faridabad
- Appointed: 6 March 2012
- Installed: 27 May 2012

Orders
- Ordination: 18 December 1983 by Mar Sebastian Mankuzhikary
- Consecration: 26 May 2012 by George Alencherry

Personal details
- Born: 1 February 1959 (age 67) Ernakulam, Kerala
- Coat of arms

Kuriakose Bharanikulangara is an Indian Catholic bishop serving as the Metropolitan Archbishop of the Syro-Malabar Catholic Archeparchy of Faridabad.

== Early life ==
Bharanikulangara was born on 1 February 1959 at Karippassery, Vattapparambu, Ernakulam, Kerala, India as the fourth son of Alia and Antony Bharanikulangara.

== Education ==
Bharanikulangara completed his primary and high school studies at the Government Lower Primary School, Vattaparambu, Kerala, St. Mary’s Upper Primary School, Moozhikkulam, Kerala and at the Government High School, Puliyanam, Kerala. He joined Minor Seminary in 1973 and completed his studies at the Sacred Heart Minor Seminary, Trikkakara, in 1976. He completed philosophy at the St. Joseph’s, Carmelgiri from 1976 to 1979 and theology at the St. Joseph’s Seminary, Mangalapuzha, Aluva from 1979 to 1983. He did his university studies in Malayalam language and literature from Kerala University from 1984 to 1988 and P. G. Diploma in journalism and communication from Bharathiya Vidhya Bhavan. He holds Licentiate in Latin Catholic canon law from Pontifical Lateran University, Rome from 1989 to 1990; Licentiate in Eastern Catholic canon law from Pontifical Oriental Institute, Rome from 1990 to 1991 and a Doctorate in Eastern Catholic canon law from the Pontifical Oriental Institute, Rome, with research work on "Particular Law of a sui iuris Church: a Blueprint for the Syro-Malabar Church" from 1992 to 1994. He had his post-doctoral Studies in jurisprudence from the Pontifical Gregorian University, Rome in 1994. He also has specialization and diplomas in religious studies from the Congregation for Religious Life which he obtained in 1990; in Sacraments – Ratum et non consummatum, from the Congregation for Divine Worship and Sacraments, obtained in 1992 and in canonization: from the Congregation for the Causes of the Saints obtained in 1993. He had his diplomatic training from the Pontifical Ecclesiastical Academy.

== Religious life ==
Bharanikulangara was ordained priest on 18 December 1983 by Mar Sebastian Mankuzhikkary. He was appointed Archbishop (Personal Title) of Faridabad (Syro-Malabar), India on 6 March 2012 and installed on 27 May 2012. He was ordained a bishop on 26 May 2012.

== Vatican Diplomat ==
Bharanikulangara was selected for the secretarial staff of the Synod for the Synod of Bishops on Religious life in 1994 and on Africa in 1995. In the Synod of the Syro-Malabar Church held in Rome in 1992 he served as a local contact person and facilitator. He has served as a Vatican Diplomat in Thailand on probation, Cameroon and Guinea Equatorial as Second Secretary, in Iraq and Jordan as First Secretary, in Venezuela and Republic of Congo and Gabon as Second Counsellor, Permanent Observer Mission of the Holy See to the United Nations in New York as First Counsellor, desk officer for the so-called Second Committee of the United Nations, dealing with development, climate change, sustainability, poverty eradication, etc. And since July 2012 as Deputy Head of the Mission at the Apostolic Nunciature in Germany. He has also served as associate editor of Sathyadeepam from 1985 to 1988). He was also associated with the St. Thomas Academy Research News during this period.

== Writings ==
- The Code of Canons of the Oriental Churches: An Introduction to Its History and Contents
- Particular law of the Eastern Catholic Churches
