= Jacob Manathodath =

Indian bishop (born 1947)

Mar Jacob Manathodath Bishop
- Bishop Emeritus of Palghat
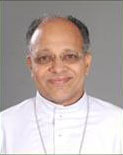
- Church: Syro-Malabar Church
- Province: Metropolitan province of Thrissur
- Diocese: Syro-Malabar Catholic Eparchy of Palghat
- Installed: 1 February 1997
- Term ended: 15 January 2022
- Predecessor: Joseph Irimpen
- Successor: Peter Kochupurackal
- Previous posts: Apostolic Administrator of Ernakulam-Angamaly (2018 - 2019); Auxiliary Bishop of Ernakulam (1992 - 1997)

Orders
- Ordination: 4 November 1972
- Consecration: 28 November 1992 by Antony Padiyara
- Rank: Bishop

Personal details
- Born: 22 February 1947 (age 79)

Jacob Manathodath (Classical Syriac: ܡܵܪܝ ܝܵܩܘܿܒ ܐܲܦܸܣܩܘܿܦܵܐ; born 22 February 1947) is a former Bishop of Palghat. Briefly he also served as the Apostolic Administrator of the Archdiocese of Ernakulam, India.

== Biography ==
Jacob Manathodath was born on 22 February 1947 in Kodamthuruthu, one of seven children born to Kurian and Kathreena. He attended the L.P. School, Kodamthuruthu, the E.C.E.K. Union High School, Kuthiathode. He entered the Sacred Heart Minor Seminary, Ernakulam, and then the Papal Seminary, Pune, where he earned his Licentiate in Philosophy and Master's in Theology. He was ordained priest on 4 November 1972.

His first assignments after ordination included Assistant Vicar of St. Mary's Cathedral Basilica, Ernakulam, and then private secretary to Cardinal Joseph Parecattil. He earned his Doctorate in Theology from the Gregorian University in Rome from 1979 to 1984.

Returning from Rome, he held various positions in the Archdiocese of Ernakulam, including Archdiocesan Secretary, secretary to Cardinal Antony Padiyara, Promoter of Justice and Defender of Bond at the Archdiocesan Tribunal, Chancellor, parish priest in Elamakara and Chempu, Eparchial Consultor, Executive Secretary of Save A Family Plan (India) and editor of Ernakulam Missam. He began teaching at St. Joseph's Pontifical Seminary, Aluva, in 1990.

On 6 September 1992, Pope John Paul II nominated him titular bishop of Abydus and Auxiliary Bishop of the Archdiocese of Ernakulam. He received his episcopal consecration on 28 November 1992 and was appointed Vicar General of the Archdiocese of Ernakulam. He chose as his episcopal motto "To do what pleases Him". Pope John Paul appointed him Bishop of Palghat on 11 November 1996 and he was installed there on 1 February 1997.

He is recognized as an authority on inculturation, an opponent of globalization and violations of human rights, and an advocate for the need for the Church to be poor.

== Real Estate & Fake Document controversy ==
On 22 June 2018, Pope Francis named Manathodath the Apostolic Administrator of the Archieparchy of Ernakulam-Angamaly. His appointment, according to Cardinal Leonardo Sandri, Prefect of the Congregation for the Oriental Churches, reflected Vatican concern about the real estate transactions as well as "ecclesiastical division" among the clergy and the archieparchy's bishops. An installation service was scheduled for 23 June with Giambattista Diquattro, Papal Nuncio to India, and several other prelates in attendance, including Cardinal George Alencherry, whose authority as Major Archbishop of the Syro-Malabar Catholic Major Archeparchy of Ernakulam-Angamaly was suspended by Manathodath's appointment as administrator, completed his duty as apostolic administrator on 26/06/2019 . His ridiculous statement regarding "fake documents" was controversial as he said "fake document is not fake rather a genuine one" while police is conducting inquiry on the matter.

== Writings ==
- Culture Dialogue And The Church: A Study on the Inculturation of the Local Churches according to the Teaching of Pope Paul VI. New Delhi: Intercultural Publications. 1990.
