= St. Thomas Church, Kokkamangalam =

St. Thomas Syro-Malabar Catholic Church, Kokkamangalam
- കോക്കമംഗലം പളളി
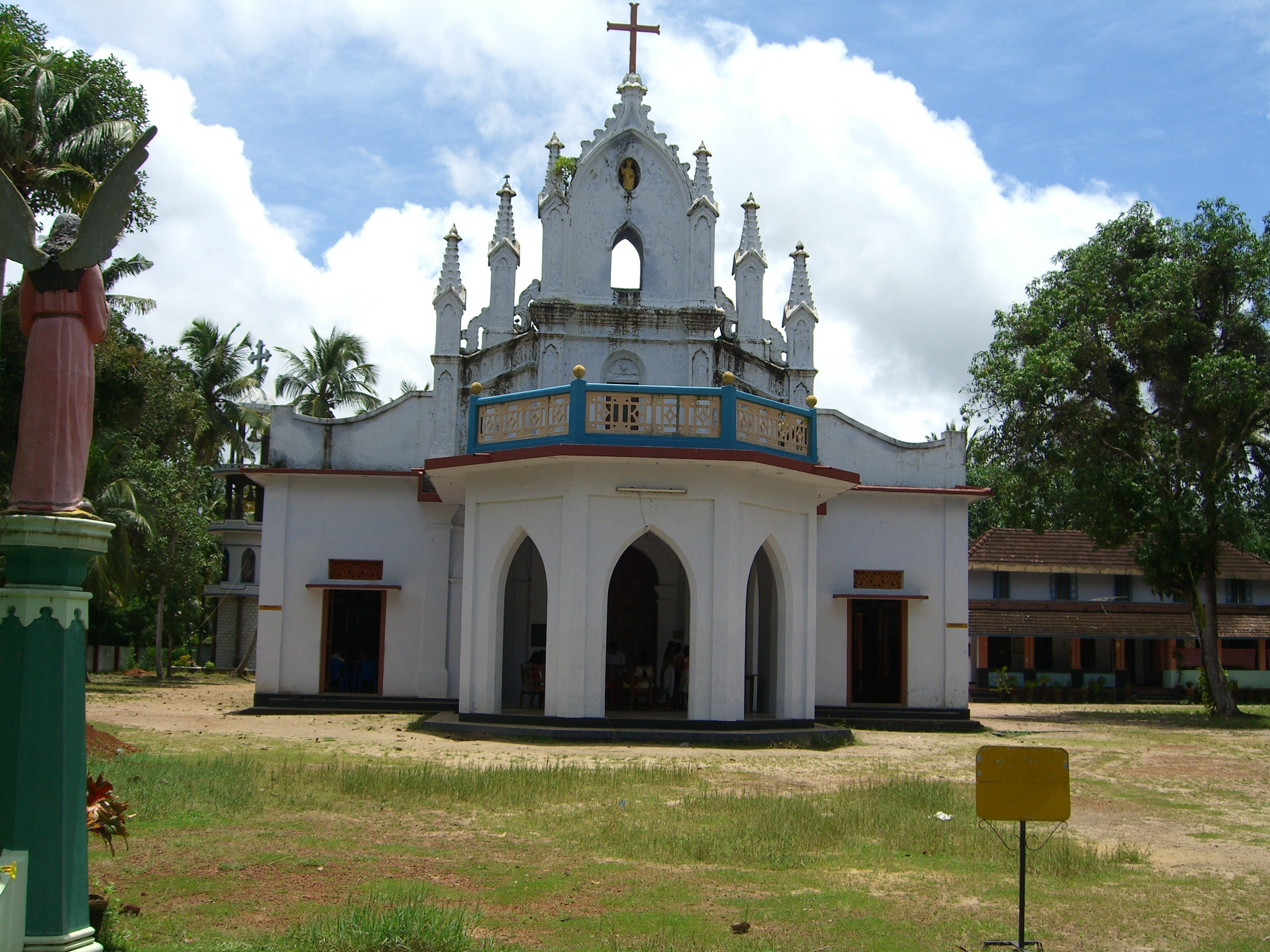
- Kokkamangalam Church in 2006

- Location in Kerala
- 9.682732°N 76.3752°E
- Location: Kerala
- Country: India

History
- Founder: St.Thomas

Architecture
- Architectural type: Mix of Persian and Kerala
- Years built: 52 A.D (?)

Administration
- District: Alappuzha
- Archdiocese: Eranakulam - Angamaly

St. Thomas Syro-Malabar Catholic Church, Kokkamangalam, popularly known as Kokkamangalam Church, which holds a midway position among the seven churches founded by St. Thomas, is in the Syro-Malabar Catholic Archdiocese of Ernakulam-Angamaly, in the South Indian state of Kerala.

St. Thomas sailed to Kokkamangalam where he preached the gospel for about a year. 1600 people converted to Christianity through him according to the narration in "Rampan Pattu", an ancient form of Christian folk-song prevalent in Kerala. He formed a Christian community at Kokkamangalam and enshrined a Cross for the faithful. This cross was later cut off by saboteurs, and thrown into the Lake Vembanad, through which it floated up to Pallippuram, where it is enshrined.

The Relic of Apostle St. Thomas enshrined here was brought from Ortona in Italy by Pope John Paul II in November 1999. Special Novena prayers are held on Friday evenings to venerate the Relic. Devotees who aspire for jobs in foreign countries seek the intercession of the Apostle here.

== Picture gallery ==
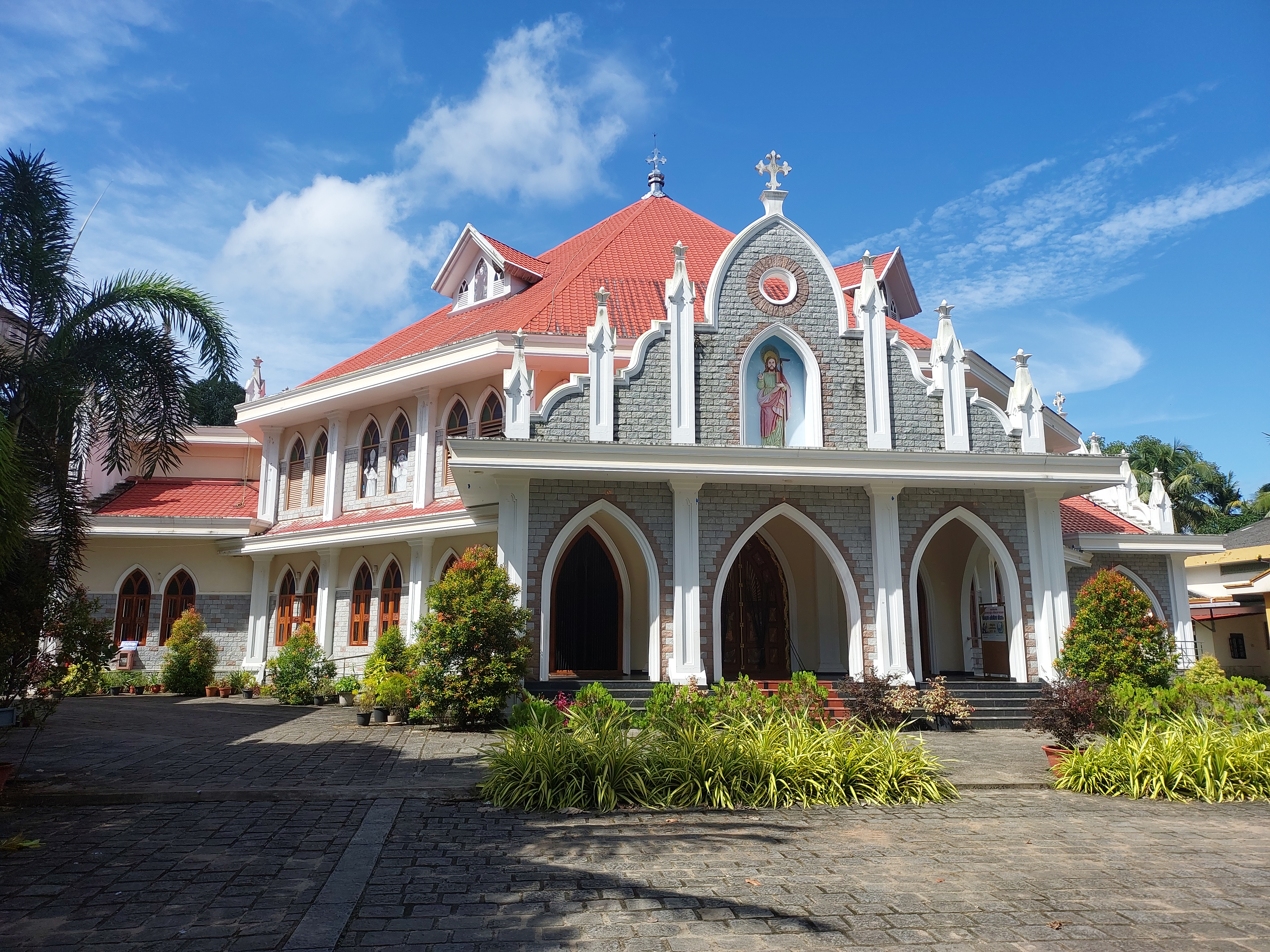
Renovated Kokkamangalam Church in 2023

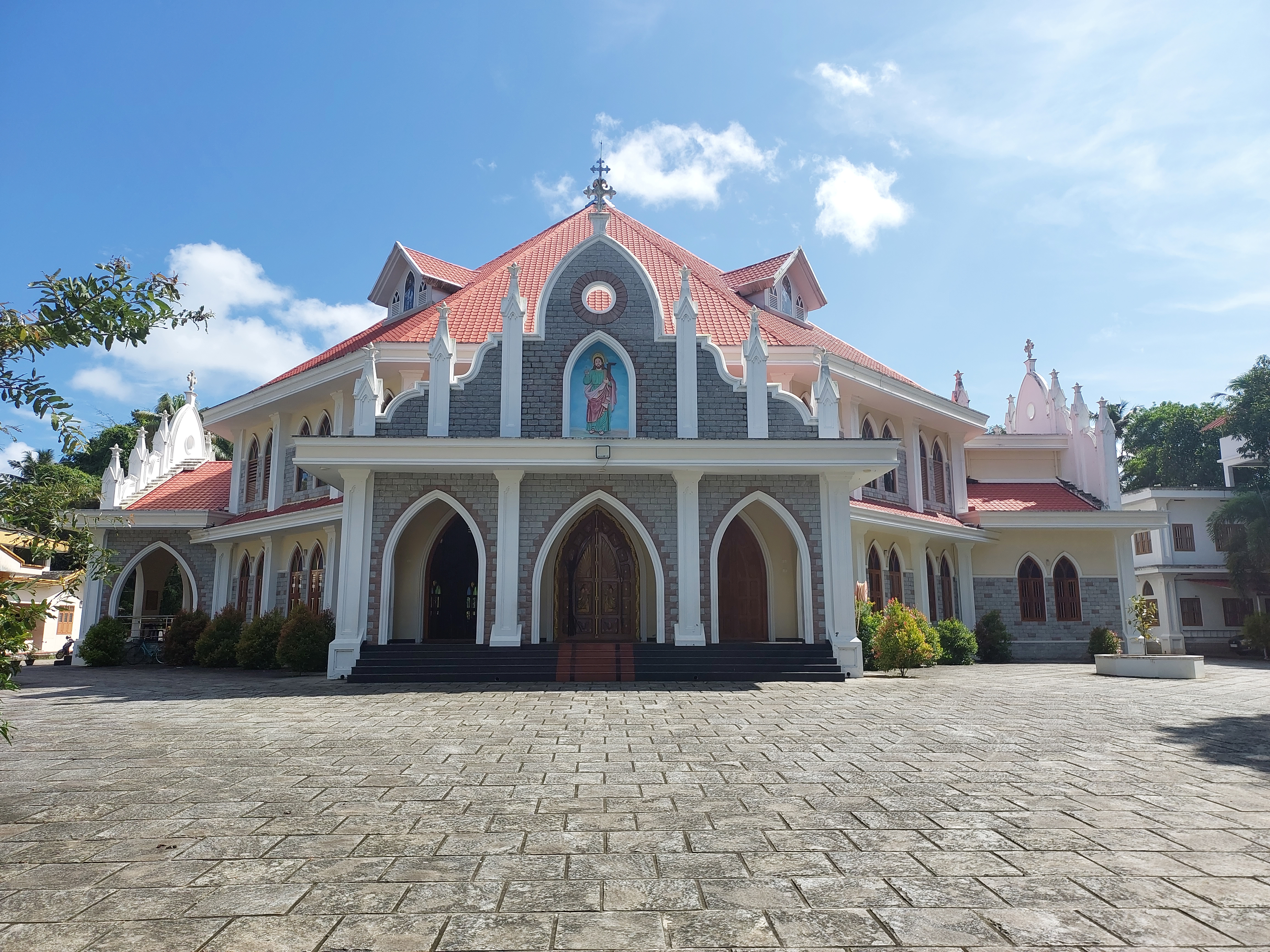
View of church from north side

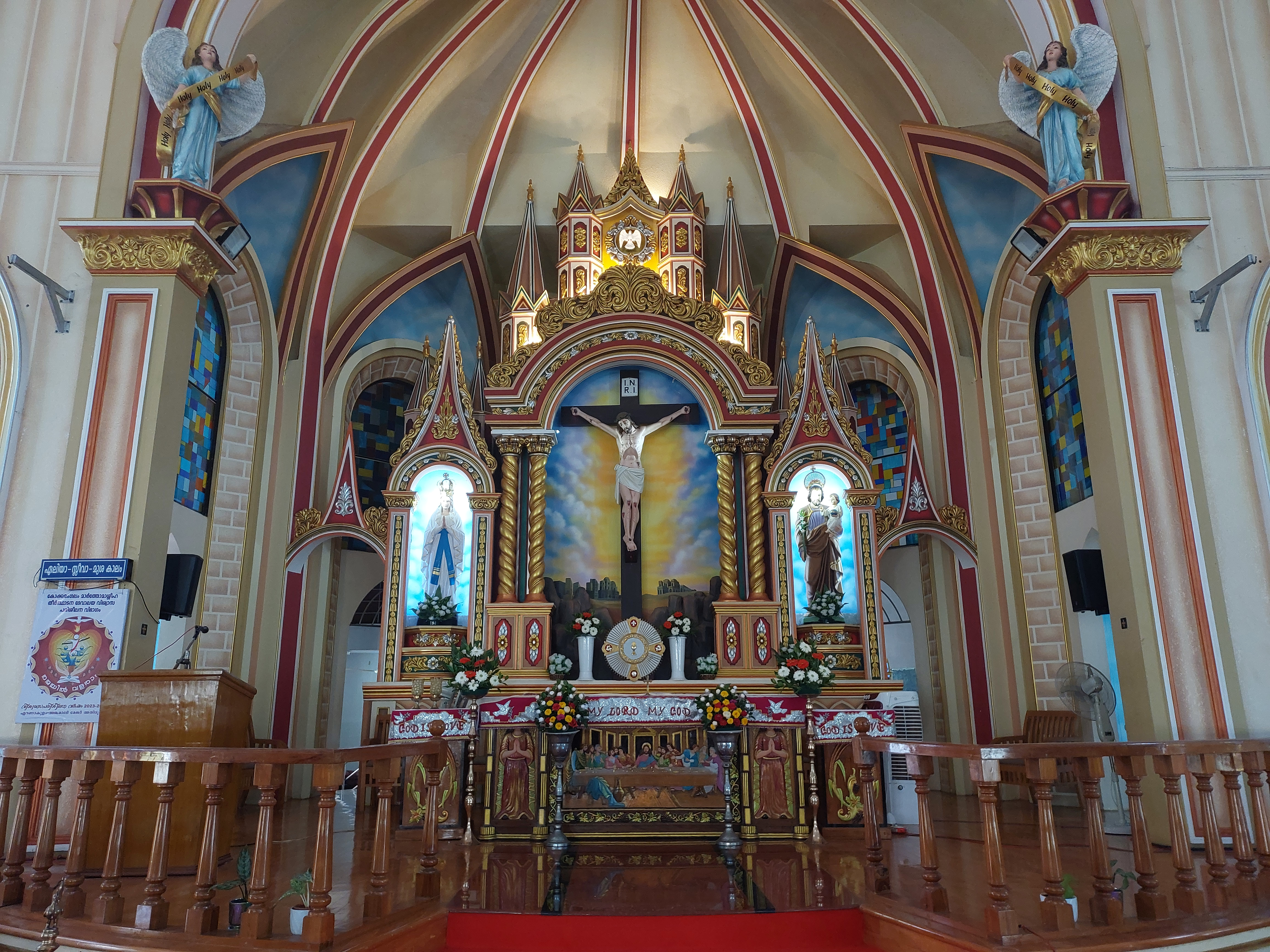
Altar

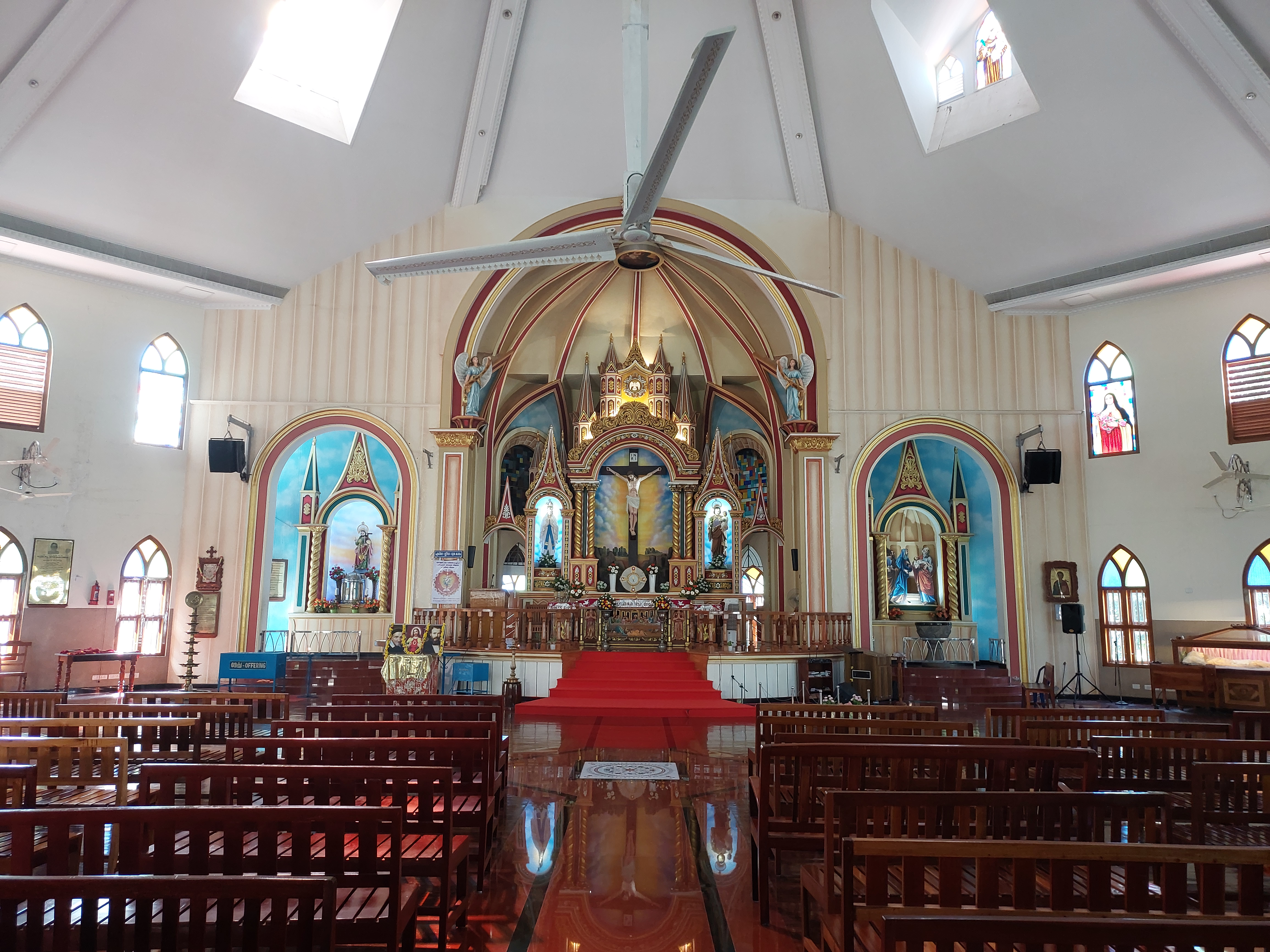
Interior

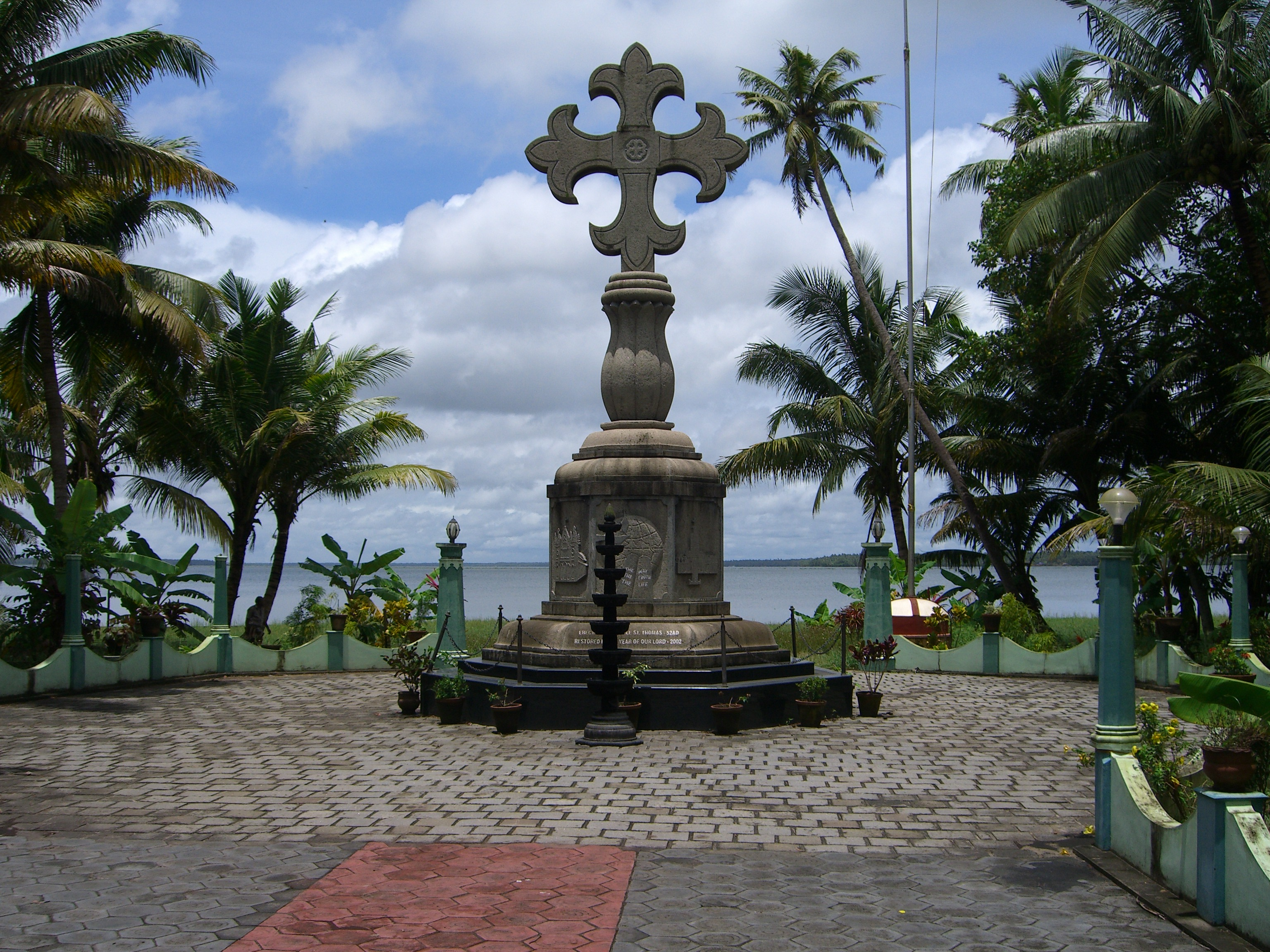
The cross reputedly erected by the Apostle Thomas in Kokkamangalam (the original one is at Pallippuram; the replica in stone was erected in 2002).

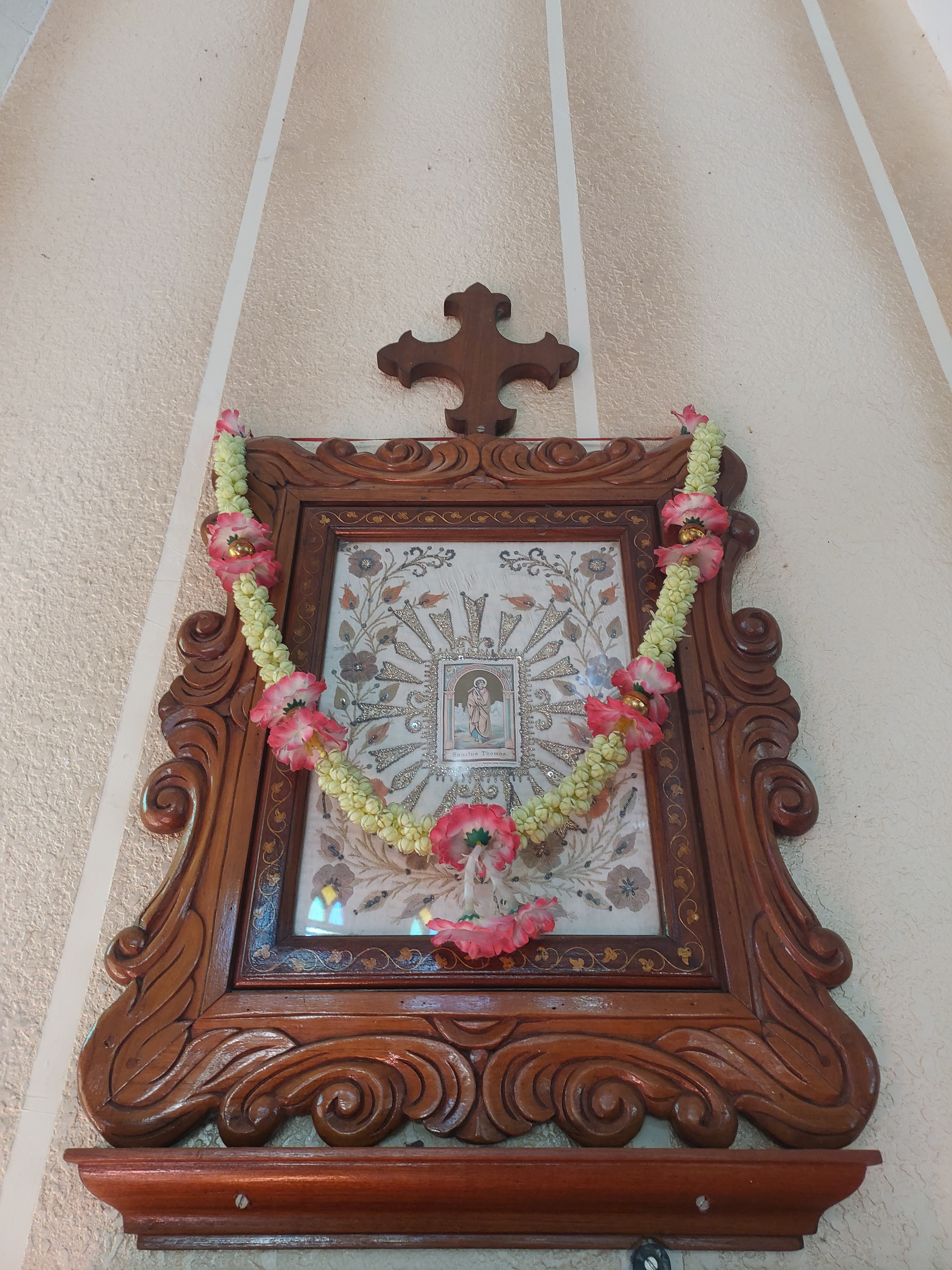
The portrait of St. Thomas is venerated here was brought from the Carmelite Monastery Mannanam in 1897 by "Albhutha Mathai", pursuant to a revelation. This portrait is mounted in a decorated waft of great artistic value.
