= Varkey Kattarath =

Indian Catholic priest

Servant of God Varkey Kattarath VC
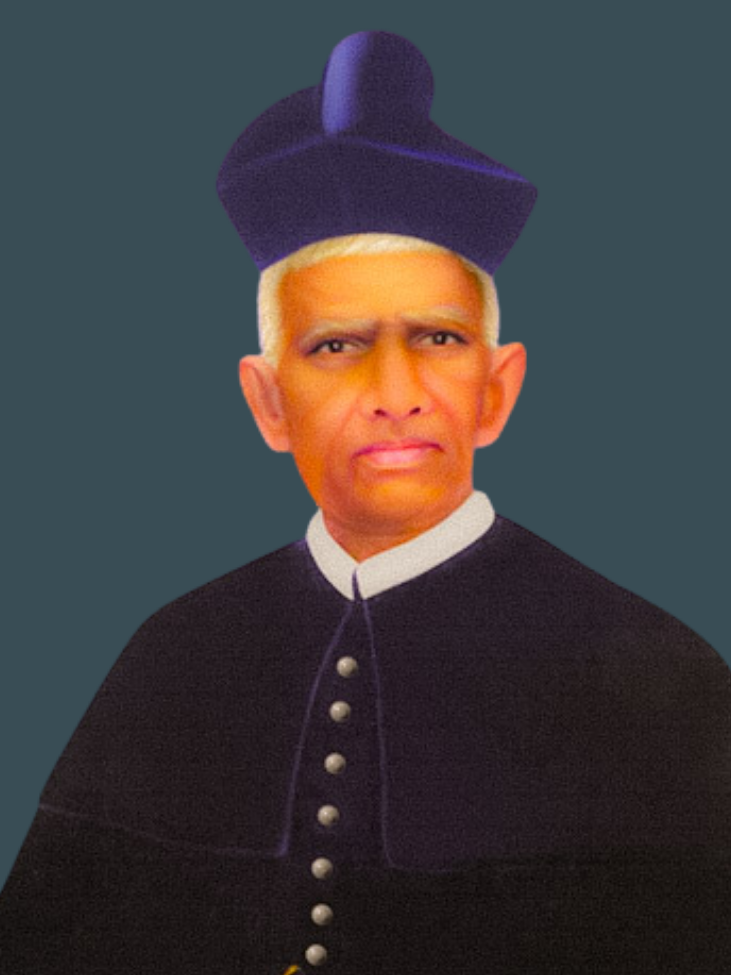

Founder of Vincentian Congregation in Kerala
- Born: 13 October 1851; Poonjar, Kottayam, Kerala
- Died: 24 October 1931 (aged 80); Thottakom, Kottayam, Kerala
- Venerated in: Catholic Church

Varkey Kattarath (13 October 1851 - 24 October 1931) was a Catholic priest of the Syro-Malabar Church and the founder of the Vincentian Congregation in Kerala, India.

== Life ==
Varkey Kattarath was born in Poonjar. He was ordained as a diocesan priest after his seminary formation at Mannanam and Pala. He served a number of parishes including Thathampally, Edamattam, Kanjirapally, Vilakkumadam, Angamaly, Ollur, Ezhupunna and Vaikom. He was also the chaplain to many convents such as the Carmelite convents at Mutholy and Vaikom and, Adoration convent founded by Mar Thomas Kurialacherry at Champakara.

He fell seriously ill in 1927 and was administered the last sacrament, but he later recovered from the sickness.

== Beginning of the Vincentian Congregation ==
Kattarath conveyed his wish to become a religious brother to Louis Pazheparambil, after he had served at various parishes as vicar in the diocese. Three other diocesan priests also joined Kattarath at Thottakam near Vaikom. Pazheparambil suggested them to follow the rule of Vincent de Paul and thus the congregation came into existence on November 20, 1904.

Even though the pioneers had started the community life, they found it difficult to lead a stable community life because of different reasons, and eventually it was dispersed in 1915.

In July 1927 the congregation was revived when Augustine Kandathil, the first archbishop of Ernakulam - Angamaly diocese granted the request of the priests George Mannara, Antony Pauvathil and George Vattamkandathil to lead a religious life in the same house in a village in Thottakam. Kattarath joined them in October 1927. Kattarath took his first vows on July 20, 1929, and perpetual vows on July 19, 1931. Not long after he professed his perpetual vows, he died on October 24, 1931; his remains were buried in the Thottakom St. Gregorious Church.

== Cause of canonization ==
Kattarath was declared a Servant of God on 5 February 2020. As of 2021, the diocesan inquiry for his cause of beatification and canonization is in progress.
