= Sathyadeepam =

Sathyadeepam ("Light of Truth") is a Malayalam Catholic weekly published from Ernakulam, Kochi in Kerala. The weekly was pretending as a verified source for the official stance of the Catholic Church. But a press release by the syro Malabar Curia clarified that the weekly not to represent any kind of official stance of the Catholic Church or syro Malabar church.

It was founded by Mar Augustine Kandathil in 1927 with Mgr. Jacob Naduvathussery as its first editor. In 2005, an English edition was also started. It is religious but socio-political weekly. Recently it was awarded the best Christian publication Media Award from the Goodness (Divine) Channel.

It is managed by the Archdiocese of Ernakulam. The current chief editor and managing director of Sathyadeepam (Malayalam) is Fr. Martin Adayanthrath. The present chief editor of Light of Truth (Sathyadeepam English)is Dr.Paul Thelakat. Police filed the chargesheet against Fr Dr. Paul Thelakat at the Judicial First Class Magistrate Court, Kakkanad, together with other three accused in a case relating to the alleged forgery of bank documents to de fame Cardinal Mar George Alencherry, Major Archbishop of the Syro-Malabar Church.
