= Joseph Parecattil =

Syro Malabar Catholic cardinal (1912–1987)

His Eminence Dr. Joseph Parecattil
- Cardinal; Archbishop of Ernakulam
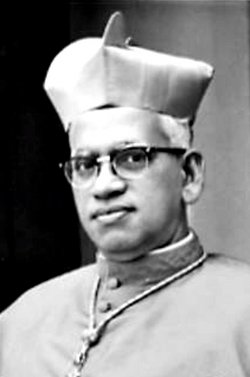
- Native name: ജോസഫ് പാറേക്കാട്ടിൽ
- Province: Ernakulam
- See: Ernakulam
- Appointed: 20 July 1956
- Term ended: 20 February 1987
- Predecessor: Augustine Kandathil
- Successor: Antony Padiyara
- Other post: Cardinal-Priest of Nostra Signora "Regina Pacis" (1969–1987)
- Previous posts: Auxiliary Bishop of Ernakulam (1953–1956); Titular Bishop of Arethusa of the Syriacs (1953–1956)

Orders
- Ordination: 24 August 1939
- Consecration: 30 November 1953 by Eugène Tisserant
- Created cardinal: 28 April 1969 by Pope Paul VI
- Rank: Cardinal-priest

Personal details
- Born: 1 April 1912 Kidangoor, Angamaly, Madras Presidency, British Raj
- Died: 20 February 1987 (aged 74) Kochi, Kerala, India
- Buried: St. Mary's Syro-Malabar Cathedral Basilica, Ernakulam, Kerala, India
- Denomination: Syro-Malabar Church

Joseph Parecattil (1 April 1912 – 20 February 1987) was an Indian prelate of the Syro-Malabar Church. He served as the 2nd archbishop of Ernakulam from 1956 to 1984, and was elevated to the cardinalate in 1969. He was the first cardinal from Kerala and second from India.

== Biography ==
Mar Joseph Parecattil was born in Kidangoor, Angamaly, Kerala, and studied at the minor seminary of Ernakulam and the Major seminary of Kandy, from where he obtained a doctorate in theology (with a dissertation entitled: "Augustine vs. Pelagius on Divine Grace". He also attended the University of Madras, where he specialised in economics. Ordained to the priesthood on 24 August 1939, he then did pastoral work in the Archdiocese of Ernakulam, serving as assistant pastor at Narakal and North Paravur and as pastor at Chunangamvely. He was also editor of the weekly Sathyadeepam ("Light of Truth").

On 28 October 1953, Fr. Parecattil was appointed Auxiliary Bishop of Ernakulam and Titular Bishop of Arethusa of the Syriacs by Pope Pius XII. He received his episcopal consecration on the following 30 November from Cardinal Eugène Tisserant, with Archbishop Joseph Attipetty and Bishop George Alapatt serving as co-consecrators. After the death of Archbishop Mar Augustine Kandathil on 10 January 1956, Mar Parecattil was promoted to Archbishop of Ernakulam on the following 20 July. His grace attended the Second Vatican Council from 1962 to 1965.

Mar Parecattil served as President of the Kerala Catholic Bishops' Council for over six years, during which time he was also Chancellor of the Pontifical Institute of Philosophy and Theology, Alwaye. His grace presided over the Syro-Malabar Episcopal Conference and the Kerala Catholic Episcopal Conference, serving as Chancellor for both the Dharmaram Pontifical Institute for Philosophy and Theology in Bangalore and the Oriental Institute of Philosophy and Theology in Kottayam. His eminence was Vice Chairman of the Catholic Bishops' Conference of India from 1966, and later served as its Chairman from 1972 to 1976.

Pope Paul VI created him Cardinal Priest of Nostra Signora "Regina Pacis" in the consistory of 28 April 1969. In addition to his duties as archbishop, Mar Parecattil was also President of the Pontifical Commission for the Revision of the Code of Oriental Canon Law from 1972 to 1987. He was one of the cardinal electors who participated in the conclaves of August and October 1978, which elected Popes John Paul I and John Paul II respectively. During his lifetime, Cardinal Joseph Parecattil collaborated with three Popes who have since been canonized as saints — Pope John XXIII, Pope Paul VI, and Pope John Paul II.

As a prominent leader of the Catholic Church in Kerala and of Christianity in the state, the Cardinals vision for the welfare of society went beyond just the community from where he came from. The Cardinal was a pivotal figure in the establishment and development of numerous institutions, both within Kerala and in other regions. Mar Joseph Parecattil as the archbishop of Ernakulam, started Lisie Hospital in 1956 and entrusted its services to the patronage of St. Thérèse of Lisieux, from whom the name 'Lisie' is derived. Bharata Mata College was started by his eminence in 1965 under Bharata Mata Educational Trust of the Archdiocese of Ernakulam-Angamaly. Kalabhavan, the cultural arts centre in Kochi, was established under his patronage by Rev. Fr. Abel CMI.In his capacity as Chairman of the CBCI, gave special attention to the development and establishment of St. John's Medical College Hospital, Bangalore. Mar Joseph Parecattil retired as Archbishop of Ernakulam on 30 January 1984, following a 28-year tenure. He continued to serve as President of the Pontifical Commission for the Revision of the Code of Oriental Canon Law until his death in 1987.

The distinguished life of Cardinal Joseph Parecattil came to an end in 1987. He was interred in St. Mary's Cathedral Basilica in Ernakulam. Justice Bhaskaran Nambiar, a former Judge of the High Court of Kerala once opined “Greatness can be a way of life. Greatness is certainly the will of God. Cardinal Parecattil was great in his lifetime, greater after his death. He lived not merely for the present, but also for the future. He had in him divine grace and that is the legacy he has left to mankind.”

In 2012, to commemorate the 100th birth anniversary of the Cardinal, India Post released a postal cover. Former Chief Minister of Kerala, Oommen Chandy lauded the late visionary's contributions towards education, healthcare and the overall development of the society at an event.

== See also ==
Catholic Church titles
Vacant Title last held by Mar Atanasio Paolo Hindo	Titular Bishop of Arethusa of the Syriacs; 28 October 1953 – 20 July 1956	Vacant Title next held by Mar Sebastian Mankuzhikary
Preceded by Mar Augustine Kandathil	2nd Archbishop of Ernakulam; 20 July 1956 – 30 January 1984	Succeeded by Mar Antony Padiyara
New office	1st Cardinal-Priest of Nostra Signora "Regina Pacis"; 30 April 1956 – 20 February 1987	Vacant Title next held by Mar Antony Padiyara
Vacant Title last held by Gregorio Pietro XV Agagianian as President of Pontifical Commission for the Codification of Oriental Canon Law	President of Pontifical Commission for the Revision of Code of Oriental Canon Law; 1972 – 20 February 1987	Vacant Title next held by Vincenzo Fagiolo as President of Pontifical Council for the Interpretation of Legislative Texts
