= Sebastian Mankuzhikary =

Roman Catholic archbishop (1929–1994)

- Eparch of Thamarassery
- Native name: സെബാസ്റ്റ്യൻ മങ്കുഴിക്കരി
- Church: Syro-Malabar Church
- Diocese: Eparchy of Thamarassery
- In office: 28 April 1986 – 11 June 1994
- Predecessor: Eparchy erected
- Successor: Jacob Thoomkuzhy
- Previous posts: Titular Eparch of Arethusa dei Siri (1969-1986); Auxiliary Eparch of Ernakulam (1969-1986)

Orders
- Ordination: 12 March 1955
- Consecration: 6 January 1970 by Joseph Parecattil

Personal details
- Born: 9 March 1929 Thanneermukkom, Travancore, British Empire
- Died: 11 June 1994 (aged 65)

Mar Sebastian Mankuzhikary (2 March 1929 – 11 June 1994) was the first bishop of the Syro-Malabar Catholic Diocese of Thamarassery (Syro-Malabar Catholic Church) in Kerala, India.

Born in Thanneermukkom, Kerala, he was educated at seminaries in India and ordained a priest on 12 March 1955. He subsequently studied philosophy at the Pontifical Gregorian University in Rome where he completed his doctoral dissertation in 1959, Metaphysical Vision of Tagore (published posthumously in 2000, ed. Joseph Therattil), a study on the writer, philosopher and Nobel laureate Rabindranath Tagore. After post-doctoral work at the Catholic University of Louvain and teaching at the St. Joseph's Pontifical Seminary in Kerala, he was ordained auxiliary bishop of Ernakulam and titular bishop of Arethusa dei Siriin on 15 November 1969 and became the first holder of the bishopric of Thamarassery in 1986.

Preceded by Post established	Bishop of Thamarassery	Succeeded by Jacob Thoomkuzhy
