= St. Mary's Syro-Malabar Cathedral Basilica, Ernakulam =

Syr-Malabar Catholic basilica in India

St. Mary's Cathedral Basilica സെന്റ് മേരീസ് കത്തീഡ്രൽ ബസിലിക്ക
- St. Mary's Syro-Malabar Catholic Cathedral Basilica, Ernakulam
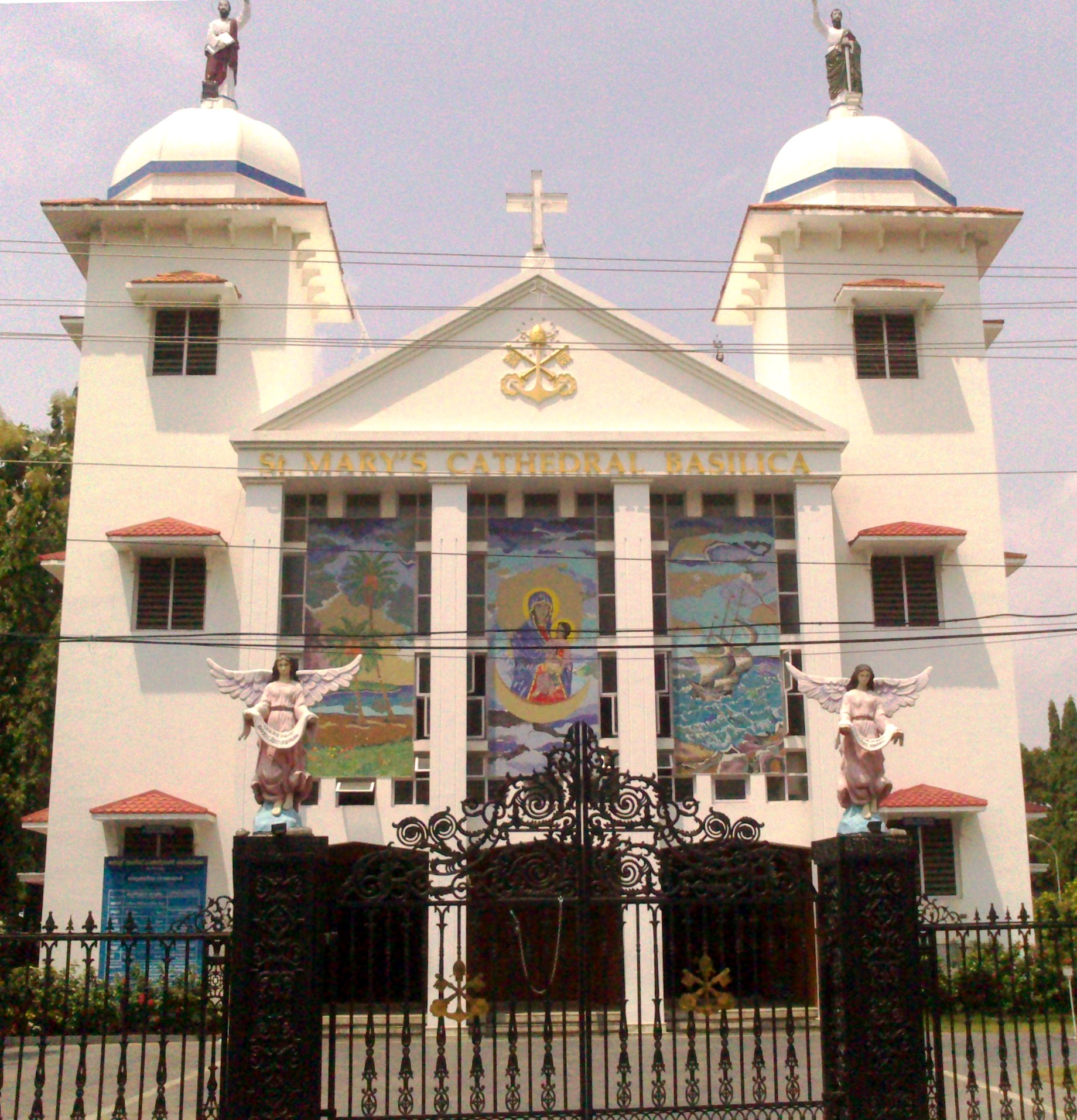
- St. Mary's Syro-Malabar Cathedral Basilica

- 9.983°N 76.275°E
- Location: (India) , Ernakulam, Kerala
- Country: India
- Denomination: Catholic Church
- Previous denomination: Church of the East
- Sui iuris church: Syro-Malabar Church
- Tradition: East Syriac Rite

History
- Former name: തുറമുഖ മാതാ പള്ളി
- Status: Cathedral Basilica
- Founded: 1112
- Dedication: Our Lady

Architecture
- Functional status: Closed

The St. Mary's Syro-Malabar Cathedral Basilica is a cathedral in Ernakulam, Kerala, India. It was founded in 1112, and is also known by the names Nasrani Palli, Anchikaimal Palli or Thekke Palli. The church is the headquarters of the Major Archeparchy of Ernakulam-Angamaly, which is the Primatal See of the Syro-Malabar Church. As of March 2026, it’s closed down and under police protection due to dispute between the rebels in the Ernakulam-Angamaly diocese and the Syro-Malabar Hierarchy. All prayers other than Holy Mass can be held with special permission from Court.

== History ==
The present church building was constructed in the early twentieth century under the direction of Mar Aloysius Pazheparambil and was elevated to the status of a Basilica by Pope Paul VI on 20 March 1974.

The large, tall and spacious cathedral has an altar that was used by pope John Paul II, when he visited India during 7 February 1986. The altar depicts the birth, the crucifixion and the resurrection of Jesus Christ. The two 68-foot tall towers in the front have statues of St Peter and St Paul on top, and the bell tower (88 feet high) has St. Thomas statue on top. There is also a depiction of Jesus's apparition to St Thomas.

== Controversies ==
=== Dispute over Uniform Mode of Celebrating Mass ===
The St. Mary's Cathedral Basilica in Ernakulam controversy reflects a deep-rooted conflict over liturgical practices, highlighting the Syro-Malabar Church's struggle between tradition and uniformity. It centers around a dispute over the implementation of a uniform mode of celebrating Holy Mass in the Arch-Diocese of Ernakulam Angamaly (The only Arch Diocese among a total of 5 Arch Diocese's that had so far refused to implement this directive), as decreed by the Synod of the Syro-Malabar Church and approved by the Holy See for implementation by Easter 2022. Adding to the origins of the dispute at St. Mary's Cathedral Basilica in Ernakulam, Archbishop Mar Antony Kariyil's tenure and resignation further exemplify the complexity of the issue. Appointed against the backdrop of a revolt and favored locally over the Vatican's choice of Archbishop Mar George Alencherry (Major Archbishop Mar George Alencherry faced criticism for his role in controversial land transactions, which reportedly led to significant financial losses for the Ernakulam-Angamaly Archdiocese. He resigned on 7th December 2023), his leadership and subsequent resignation on 26 July 2022 under Vatican pressure reflect the ongoing struggle between traditional autonomy and centralized ecclesiastical directives within the church.

The Basilica witnessed the dispute take a violent turn on 28 November 2022 when Archbishop Mar Andrews Thazhath, who was supposed to conduct the uniform mass as per prior assurance by then Archdiocese Metropolitan Vicar Mar Antony Kariyil (Kariyil had earlier agreed along with the priests to move to uniform mode before December 25th, 2022 as per Pope Francis Directives communicated back in April 2022), was blocked at the gates by the Vicars supporters (Athirupatha Samrakshana Samithi and Almaya Munnetta Samithi). The situation escalated with the group locking the gate, preventing the archbishop's entry. To avoid further conflict, the archbishop returned without conducting the mass, and the vicar of the Basilica later held the mass in the old format. This incident initially led to the temporary closure of the Basilica by police.

Plans for reopening in June 2023 faced setbacks due to ongoing disagreements. The reopening of the Basilica was initially approved conditionally by the Special Synod. However, the Basilicas vicar and trustees retracted their agreement to only celebrate the Unified Holy Mass, leading to further continuation of the Basilicas closure. It was reopened by ArchBishop Cyril Vasil on 16 August 2023 under heavy police protections and protests.

On 17 August 2023, Archbishop Cyril Vasil, appointed by the Vatican to address the Ernakulam-Angamaly archdiocese dispute, ordered all parishes to follow the uniform mass format, with non-compliance risking excommunication. This directive came despite resistance in Ernakulam-Angamaly, where many, led by priests and groups such as Athirupatha Samrakshana Samithi (Arch Diocese Protection Group) and Almaya Munnetta Samithi, formed by former Vicar Mar Antony Kariyil (now retired), protested against the order by burning the Bishops order. By the time the directive was issued 2,902 out of the 3,224 Syro Malabar parishes across Kerala's 35 dioceses & 5 Arch- Dioceses had already complied with the uniform mode mass format.

On 18 August 2023, Almaya Munnetta Samithi claiming to represent all parishioners from the Ernakulam-Angamaly Archdiocese and its 328 dioceses petitioned President Droupadi Murmu, seeking the deportation of Papal delegate Archbishop Cyril Vasil, citing interference in local church affairs. ArchBishop Vasil's visit to Kochi aimed to resolve disputes over the uniform Holy Mass implementation. The petition, by Almaya Munnetta Samiti, alleges Vasil's actions violate India's sovereignty and demands legal action. The controversy has led to significant dissent and protests, including Vasil's forced entry into St Mary's Cathedral and the appointment of a new administrator, exacerbating tensions. The organization criticizes the Kerala government's support for Vasil, deeming it unconstitutional. They have made similar representations to Prime Minister Narendra Modi, Home Minister Amit Shah and External Affairs Minister S Jaishankar.

On 7 December 2023, In a slightly unusual move Pope Francis reached out directly to the faithful of the Syro-Malabar community in Ernakulam in an open video message, to be clear of his direct involvement and understanding of the issue. Pope Francis set a Christmas deadline for the Ernakulam-Angamaly Arch-Diocese to resolve its liturgical dispute, emphasizing unity and warning against sectarianism. He urged the Arch-Diocese to embrace diversity without becoming a sect, reflecting on the potential of diversity to enrich rather than divide. The Pope's intervention highlights the urgency and importance of resolving internal conflicts within the Church, focusing on communal harmony and adherence to broader Catholic principles and prevent excommunication. "In the name of the Lord, for the spiritual good of your church, of our church, I ask you to heal this rupture. It is your church; it is our church. Restore communion; remain in the Catholic Church," the pope said in the video.

== Gallery ==
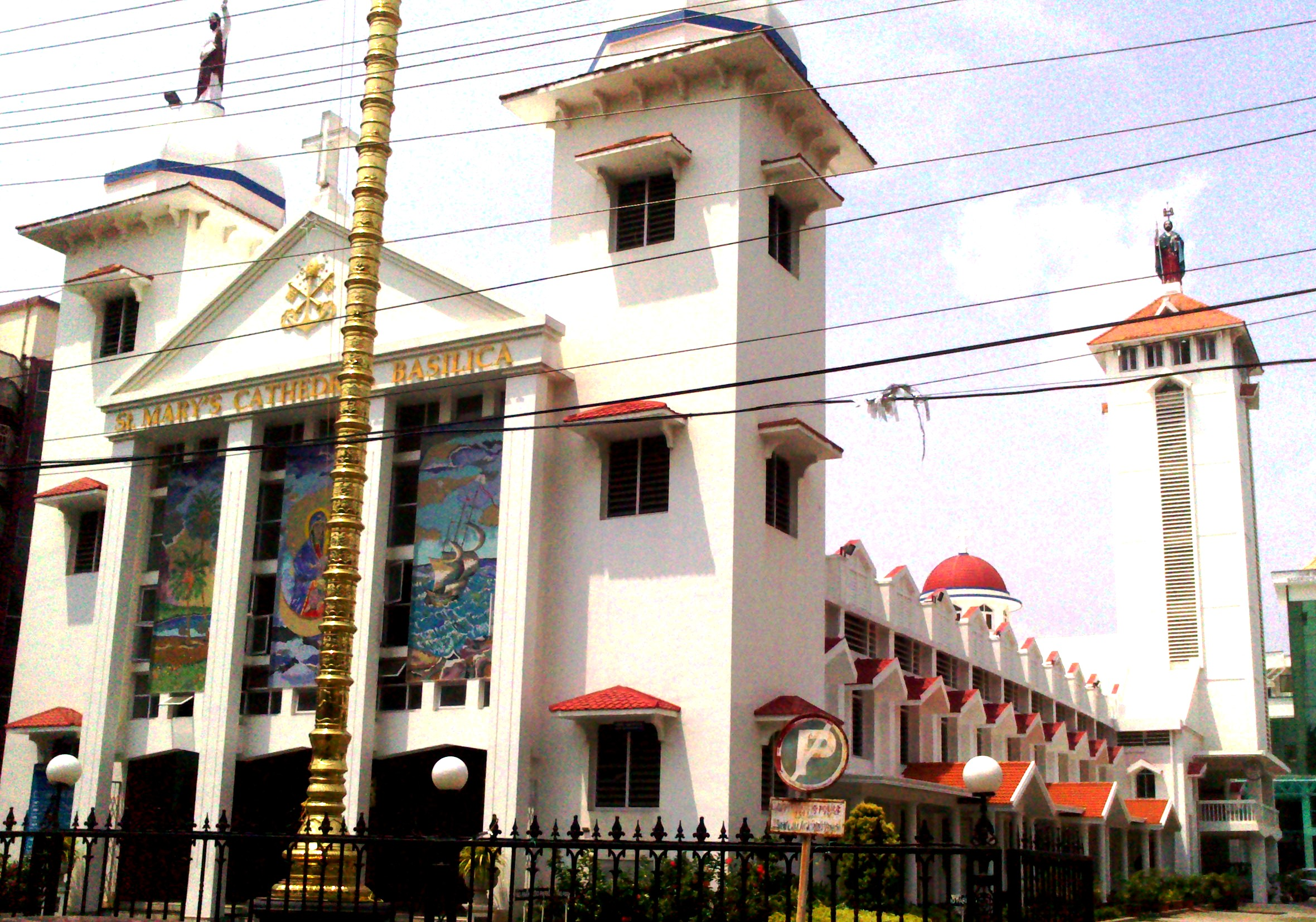
St Mary's Syro Malabar Basilica

Entrance of the Basilica

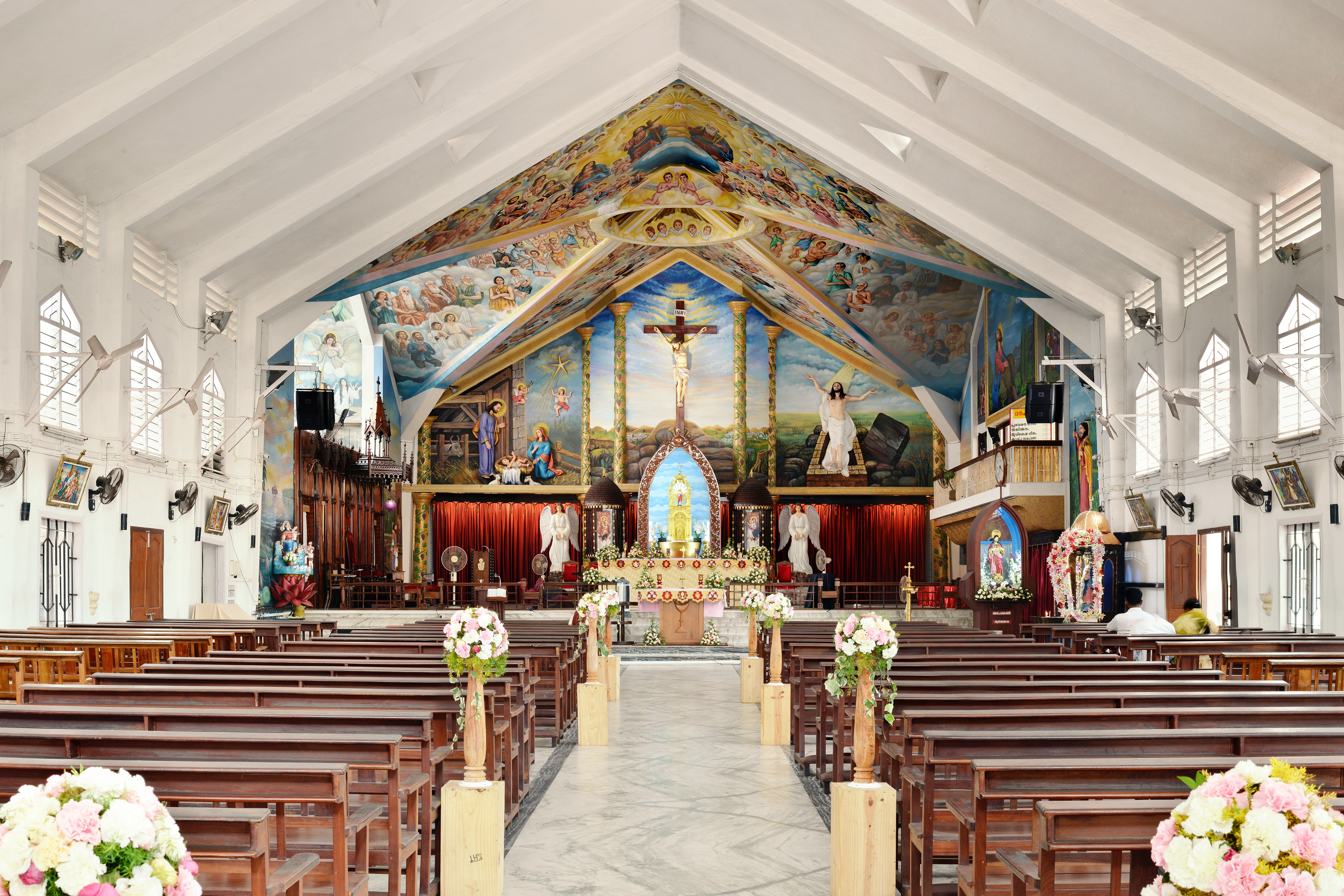
Interior view

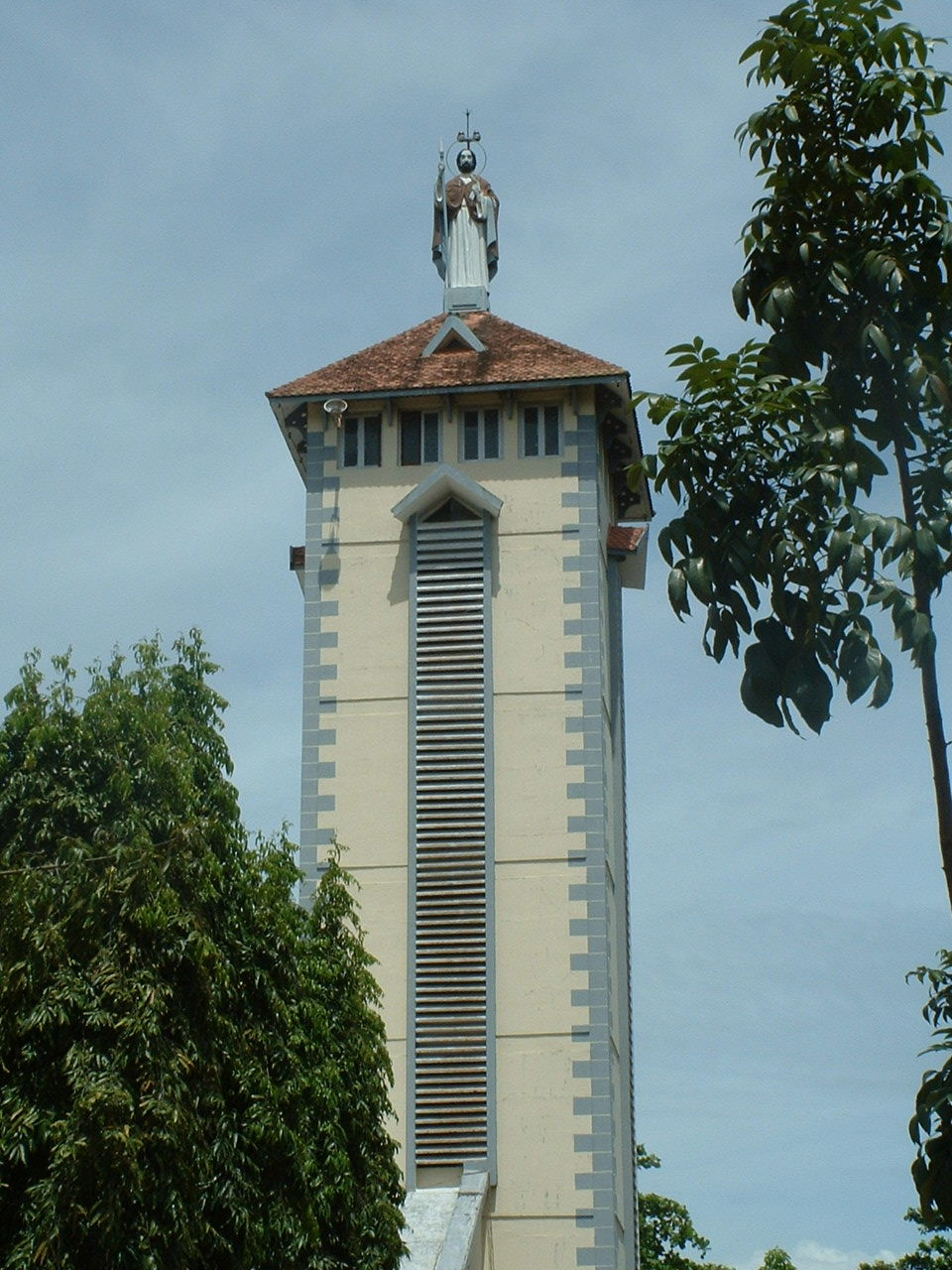
Belfry

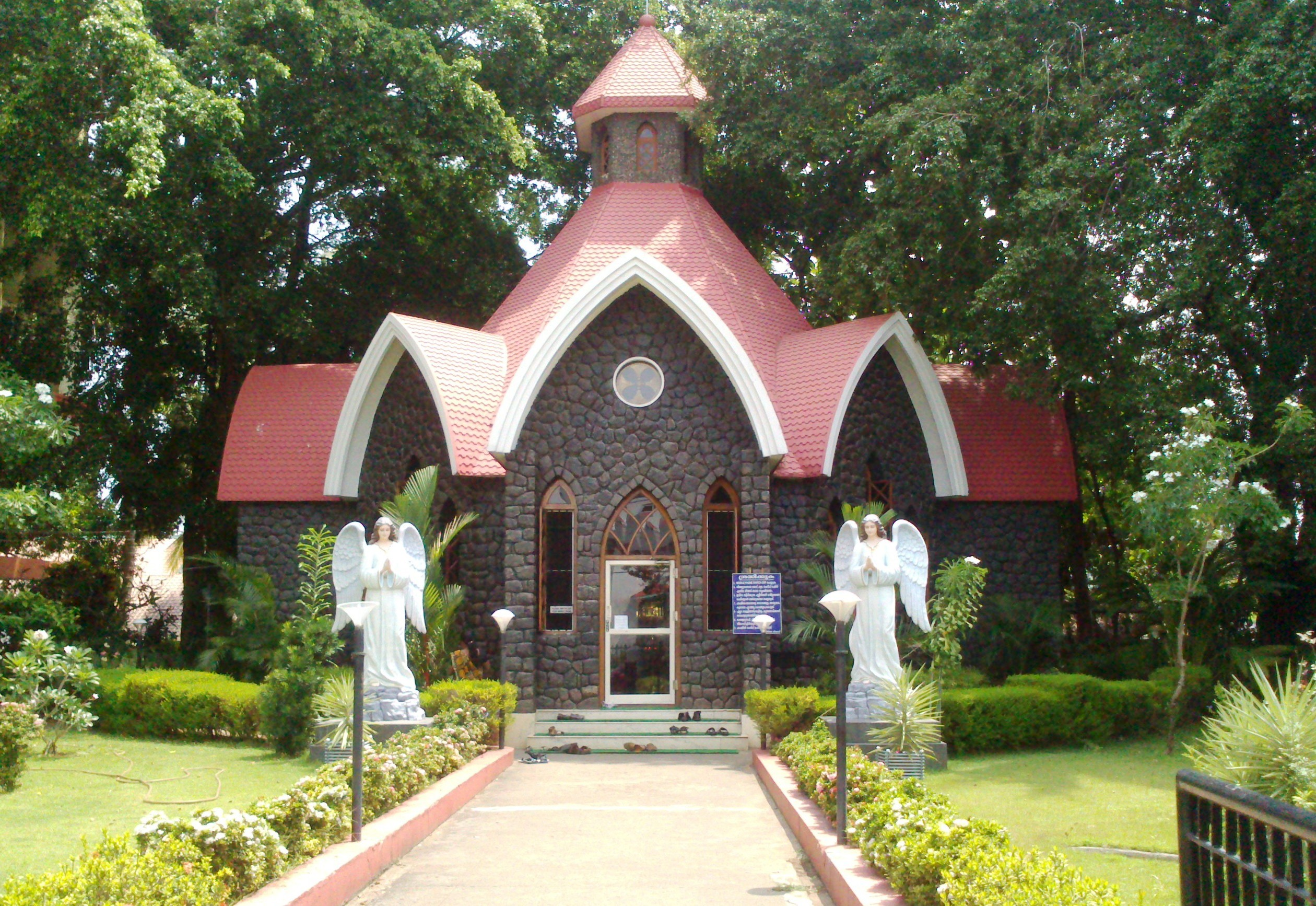
Perpetual Adoration Chapel

== See also ==
- Kottakkavu Mar Thoma Syro-Malabar Pilgrim Church, North Paravur
- Mar Hormiz Syro-Malabar Catholic Church, Angamaly
- St. George Syro-Malabar Catholic Forane Church, Edappally
- List of cathedrals in India
