= John Panamthottathil =

Indian Syro-Malabar Catholic bishop

Mar John Panamthottathil
- Eparch of St. Thomas of Melbourne
- Church: Catholic Church
- Diocese: Syro-Malabar Catholic Eparchy of Melbourne
- Appointed: 14 January 2023
- Predecessor: Bosco Puthur

Orders
- Ordination: 26 December 1997 by George Valiamattam
- Consecration: 31 May 2023 by George Alencherry, Mark Coleridge, Remigius Inchananiyil, and Bosco Puthur

Personal details
- Born: 31 May 1966 (age 60) Peravoor, Kannur district, Kerala, India
- Coat of arms

Mar John Panamthottathil (born 31 May 1966) is an Indian-born bishop of the Syro-Malabar Catholic Church in the Australia and Oceania. He is currently the eparch of the Syro-Malabar Catholic Eparchy of Melbourne.

== Biography ==
=== Early life and ministry in India ===
John Panamthottathil was born in Peravoor, Kerala. John entered the Carmelites of Mary Immaculate Syro Malabar Institute of Pontifical Right in Kozhikode where he gave his solemn profession. On 26 December 1997, He was ordained a priest by Archeparch George Valiamattam into the Archeparchy of Tellicherry. He continued his studies at Dharamaram College for Philosophy and Theology along with a Master of Arts in English Literature at Devagiri College (Kozhikode) and a Master in Education at St. Joseph's College, Mannanam. He also was a parochial priest, educator, and provincial superior in Thamarassery. He speaks Malayalam, English, and Hindi

=== Ministry in Australia ===
John, while he was the Provincial of St. Thomas Province of the C.M.I. Congregation, has visited Sacred Heart Church, Lawrenceburg, the Roman Catholic Diocese of Nashville, Tennessee, United States in 2008, and in 2015, he moved to Australia to serve in the Latin Catholic Archdiocese of Brisbane until 2020. In Brisbane, He served at an assistant pastor at Cathedral of St Stephen and Saint Bernardine Church, Regents Park and then served at Our Lady and Saint Dympna's Church, Aspley as its parochial pastor. While his time serving Latin Congregations, he also served the Syro Malabar community in Australia.

=== Return to Ministry in India ===
In 2020, He returned to India where he joined the Syro-Malabar Catholic Eparchy of Mananthavady and served as the parish priest of Saint Elias Church, Nirvilpuzha until his appointment as bishop. He also served as an English Educator at the Bendictine Ashram, Makkiyad.

=== Eparch ===
On 14 January 2023, Major Archbishop George Alencherry announced the appointment of John Panamthottahil as the 2nd Eparch of Melbourne after Pope Francis accepted Bishop Bosco Puthur's resignation after he reached the age of 75. Puthur, Alencherry, and Panamthottahil hosted a press conference announcing the appointment after the January meeting of the Synod of Bishops.

On 31 May 2023, He was installed by Alencherry in the presence of Archbishop of Brisbane Mark Coleridge, Archbishop of Tellichery Joseph Pamplany, and Bishop-Emertius Bosco Puthur at Our Lady Guardian of Plants Chaldean Catholic Church in Campbellfield, Victoria.
