= St. George Forane Church Kallody, Wayanad =

St. George Forane Church Kallody, Wayanad.
- St. George Forane Church, Kallody
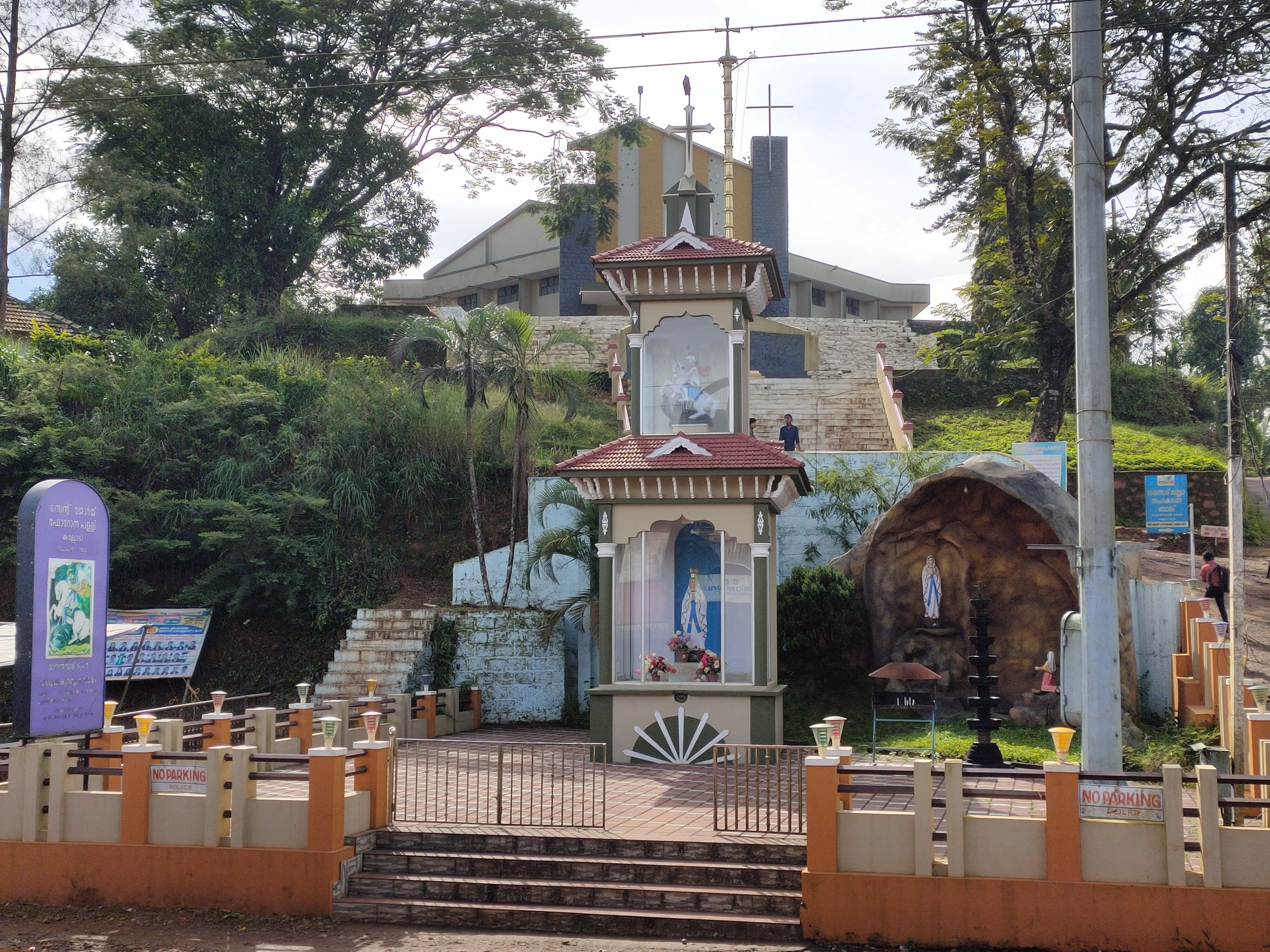
- St. George Forane Church Kallody, Wayanad.
- 11°45′56″N 75°57′41″E
- Location: Kallody, Wayanad District
- Country: India
- Denomination: Syro-Malabar Catholic Church

History
- Status: Forane Church
- Founded: 1943
- Dedication: Saint George and Mother Mary
- Consecrated: 23 April 1943

Architecture
- Functional status: Active

Administration
- Diocese: Syro-Malabar Catholic Diocese of Mananthavady
- Parish: Kallody

Clergy
- Archbishop: Mar. Joseph Pamplany
- Bishop: Mar Jose Porunnedom
- Vicar: Rev. Fr. Saji Kottayil

St. George Forane Church Kallody is situated in Mananthavady taluk of Wayanad district. It is one of the important churches and pilgrim centers in the region, in communion with the Syro-Malabar Catholic Church.

== History ==
People from many parts of Travancore-Cochin region started to settle at Kallody as early as 1942 onward. The geography of the place with hills, fields, rivers, streams, fertile land and a comparably increased security from wild animals attracted people to settle here. Many of the early settlers from Travancore region belonged to Syrian Catholics and other Christians whom the natives welcomed wholeheartedly. Until 1943 Immaculate Conception Church, Mananthavady was the only spiritual refuge of the Christian community of Kallody. Not so late, parishioners from some sixteen families spent some money, bought a piece of land and started building a small construction. In 1943 April 23, the statue of St. George was installed and Rev. Fr. Alosius Di Silva celebrated the first holy Mass.

In 1948 the former construction was changed and a modified construction for the church was built. From 1949 onward Rev. Fr. C.J Varky started celebrating the Holy Mass here. In 1951 August 25 Bishop of Calicut Rev. Patroni made Kallody parish an independent parish from under the administration of the Immaculate Conception Church, Mananthavady. He appointed Rev. Fr. Thomas Kalam SJ as the vicar of the parish. Until 1953 Kallody parish was under the administration of Diocese of Calicut. When the Diocese of Tellicherry, as part of Syro-Malabar Catholic Church was formed in 1953, the parish came under the administration of the Diocese of Tellicherry and the first bishop of the diocese, Mar. Sebastian Valloppilly.

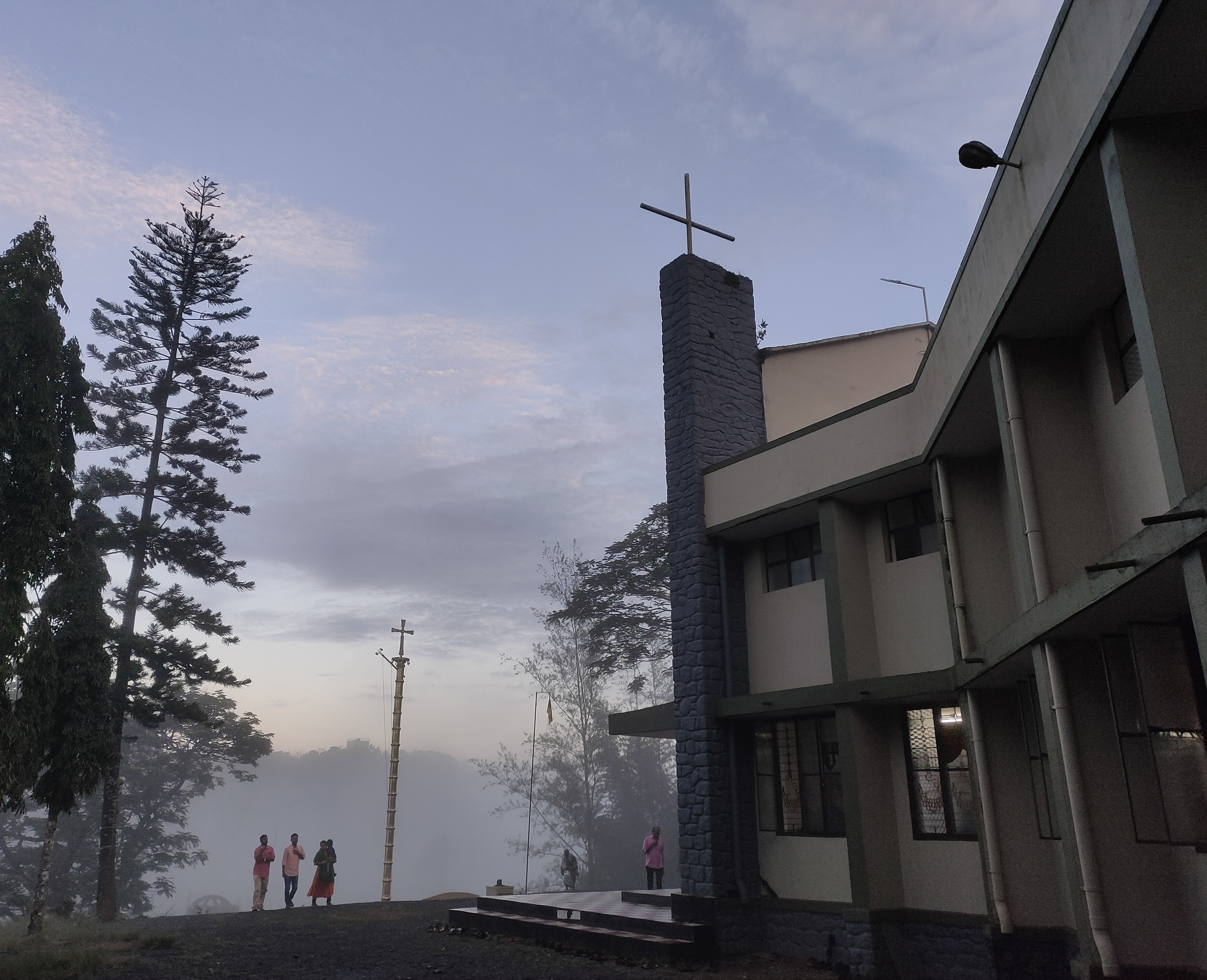
Church on a misty day.

Until April 1954 when Rev. Fr. Sebastian Ilamthuruthi took charge of the parish, the parish had been led by Latin priests. Fewer number of priests from the host diocese forced Bishop Sebastian Valloppilly to appoint priests from Carmelite congregation. During this period Kallody parish had grown both spiritually and physically well with the help of the Rev. priests. The parish has no history excluding the helps of the reverend priests from the Diocese of Calicut and from the CMI Church. Their efforts were seminal in the development of the parish. The church and the place got its present wealth, roads, means of transportation and primary education facilities through the hands of these reverend priests.

After the formation of Diocese of Mananthavady, bifurcating the Diocese of Tellicherry in 1973 May 1, the parish continued its developments under the new diocese and the guidance of its bishop Jacob Thoomkuzhy. Though the church is named after St. George, from 1958 onward, in the Centenary of Mary of Lourde's, the main feast of the church became Mary of Lourde's.

After 1968 priests from Diocese of Tellicherry and Mananthavady serve the parish. During this period the parish witnessed immeasurable growth. In the field of agriculture, new farming techniques were tested. In the educational sector High School and Higher Secondary Schools were established and in the cultural sector a Reading-House was set. In the recent past, the forane of Dwaraka was formed bifurcating the forane of Kallody. The construction works for the new church is underway. As part of it the forane office cum rectory was blessed on 8 June 2019 by bishop of diocese of Mananthavady, Mar. Jose Porunnedom. Today, the church continues her growth with the helps of the reverend priests and the laymen. She intervenes in the cultural sphere of the place whenever time finds it necessary.

== Spiritual organizations and institutions ==
=== Franciscan Clarist Congregation (FCC) ===
Franciscan Clarist Congregation which has its roots outside India started to operate in Kerala in the early 19th century onward. In 1956 a branch of FCC started to operate in the Diocese of Tellichery of Malabar province. With the intention of helping the people of parish and caring the educational needs of their children the first house of the congregation in Wayanad started here at Kallody on 1 June 1957.

=== Shoenstatt Sisters of Mary ===
Shoenstatt Sisters of Mary is a global spiritual institution founded by Fr. Joseph Kentonick in the year 1914. The community started its work in India in 1984 and now operates in many places of India. The community started working in the Kallody parish in 18 December 1997 at Moolithodu.

=== St Joseph’s Pre- Primary School Kallody ===
With the intention of helping the younger generation of the place to the world of letters St. Joseph's Pre-Primary School Kallody was inaugurated on 2 June 2003 by the then co-operate manager Rev. Fr. Jose Kocharakkal.

=== St. Joseph’s U.P School Kallody ===
The school was originally started in 1948 by P. Kunhiraman Nair by the name ‘Edachana Elementary School’. Later in 1952 the school was transferred on to the administration of the church under the leadership of Fr. Thomas Kalam. Since then the school started to be known as St. Joseph's. The school now excels in the field of both curricular and non-curricular activities.

=== St Joseph’s High School Kallody ===
The increasing need for higher education resulted in the establishment of a high school. The school was inaugurated on 1 June 1976 under the leadership of the then manager Fr. Joseph Memana.

=== St. Joseph’s Higher Secondary School Kallody ===
As Part of the extended educational demands of the people, a higher secondary school was set up on 1 August 2000 under the leadership of the then co-operate manager Fr. Augustin Nilackappillil. The school offers courses in General Science, Computer Science and Commerce with all academic facilities necessary for a good Higher Secondary School in the state.

=== Other spiritual organizations ===
- Chrupushpa Mission League
- Vincent De Paul Society (Estd. in Kallody on 29 September 1974)
- KCYM (Kerala Catholic Youth Movement)
- Mother's Community (Estd. in Kallody in 1985)
- AKCC (All Kerala Catholic Congress) (Estd in Kallody on 25 February 2007)

== Parishes under the Forane ==
Deepthigiri, Kallody, Karimbil, Kunjom, , Makkiyad, Mangalasseri, Mothakkara, Niravilppuzha, Ozhukkanmoola (Vellamunda), Puthusseri, Puthiyidamkunnu, Vanjod, Jude's Mount, Valeri

== Monasteries and convents in the Forane ==
=== Monasteries ===
- Carmelites of Mary Immaculate (CMI), Niravilppuzha
- Benedictine Fathers (OSB), Makkiyad

=== Convents ===
- Franciscan Clarist Congregation (FCC)- Kallody, Karimbil, Puthusseri
- Missionary Sisters of Mary Immaculate (MSMI)- Makkiyad, Niravilppuzha
- Sacred Heart Congregation (SH)- Puthiyidamkunnu, Vanjod
- Shoenstatt Sisters of Mary (ISSM)- Moolithodu (Kallody)

== Annual feast ==
The annual feast of the church usually starts in the first week of every February. It is a widely anticipated event of spiritual and cultural significance.
