= St. George's Syro-Malabar Forane Church, Kulathuvayal =

Coordinates: 11.56018°N 75.81589°E

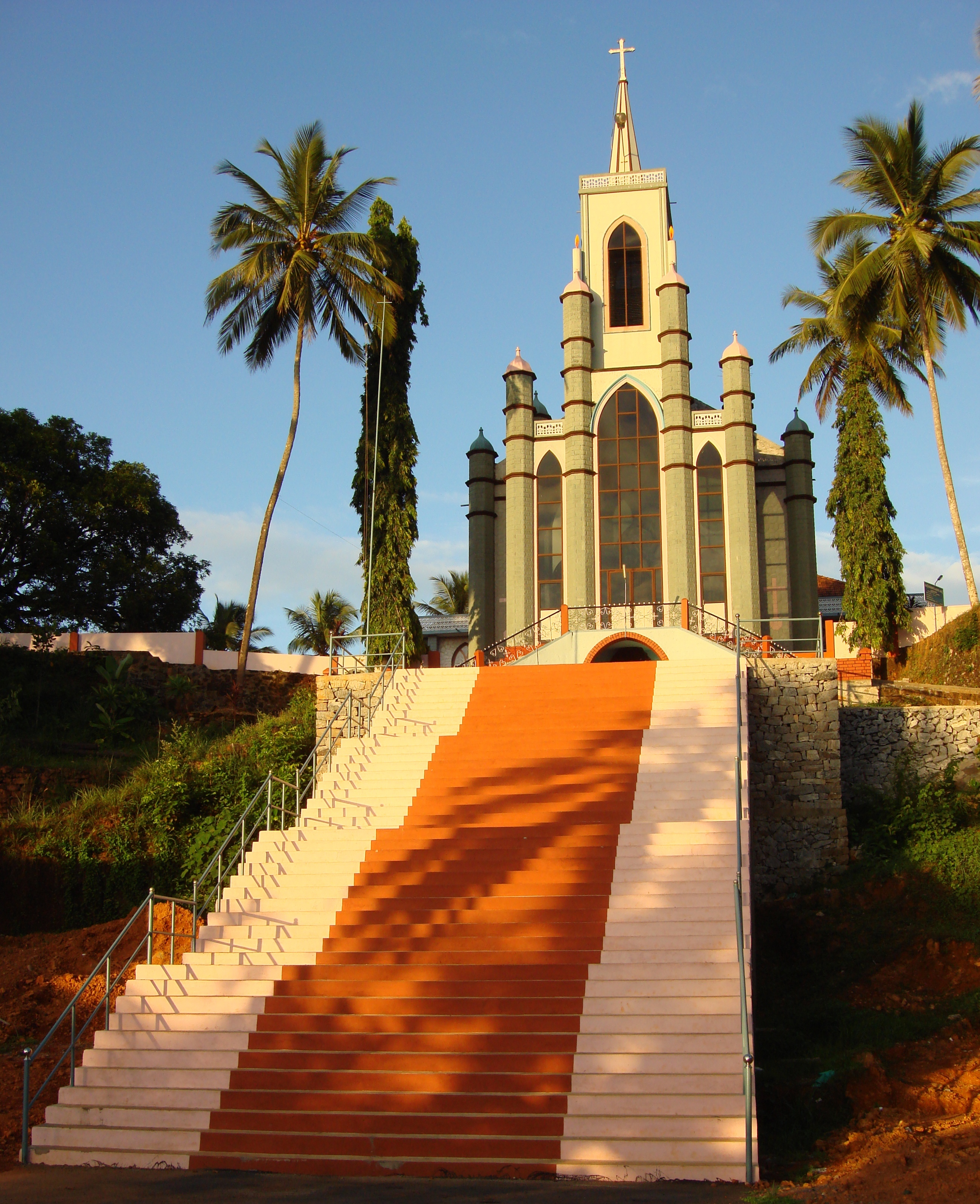
- St. George Shrine Pilgrim Centre Kulathuvayal

- Location in Kerala, India
- Location: Kulathuvayal, Kerala
- Country: India
- Denomination: Syro-Malabar Catholic Church

History
- Status: Shrine
- Founded: 1941
- Founder: Rev. Fr. Joseph Peediekkal
- Dedication: Saint George

Architecture
- Functional status: Active
- Architect: Msgr. C. J. Varkey, Kuzhikulam
- Architectural type: Gothic

Administration
- District: Kozhikode
- Archdiocese: Syro-Malabar Catholic Archeparchy of Tellicherry
- Diocese: Syro-Malabar Catholic Eparchy of Thamarassery

St. George's Syro-Malabar Forane Church is a Catholic pilgrimage church in Kulathuvayal, Perambra, Kozhikode, India.

== History ==
During the large-scale migration in the 1920s and 1930s from central Travancore, the whole of Malabar was under the Latin diocese of Kozhikode. The administrators of the diocese paid special attention to the spiritual needs of the new settlers and gave them all the necessary help. The nearest Catholic Church in those days was at Vadakara. As new Christian settlements were established, the missionaries of Kozhikode diocese started paying attention to the needs of the community. The first among those who came to Kulathuvayal had been Fr. Siaro, Fr. Rebello, and Fr. Joseph Peediekkal. It was Fr. Siaro who celebrated the first holy mass at Kulathuvayal. That had been in the house of Mathur Cherian, one of the earliest settlers of the area.

The bishop of Kozhikode, Leo Presarpio SJ, understood the problems of the settlers and did everything to help them. In 1941, he authorized Fr. Joseph Peediekkal, the vicar of Vadakara church, to manage the spiritual needs of the people of Kulathuvayal, Maruthonkara and Padathukadavu, which were part of the Perambra settlement area.

Every Sunday, Fr. Peediekkal celebrated the holy mass for the settler community at Kulathuvayal, in the house of Chacko Njallimakkal.

The church, named after St. George, was established in 1941 under the initiative of Fr. Peediekkal. Janab Moythu Sahib donated 10 acres (40,000 m^{2}) of prime land at Kulathuvayal hill top for the new church. The thatched shed for the new church was constructed under the leadership of Fathers Peediekkal, Mathew Kappukattil, and John Makkil. Taking a contribution of 25 paise each during prayer meetings had accumulated the necessary money. The cemetery was also established near the church by Fr. Peediekkal in 1941.

In 1943 the church building was reconstructed. It was a strong edifice built on granite pillars and was given a tiled roof. The new building was constructed literally on the strength of the gold ornaments of about 25 families. They were mostly the humble offerings of the poor mothers who were struggling in the midst of dangerous fevers and acute scarcity. Very soon Rev. Presarpio appointed Fr. DeCosta to assist Fr. Peediekkal. He used to come to Kulathuvayal on Saturday, say the mass on Sunday and then return to Kozhikode. On 28 January 1944, the bishop came to Padathukadavu and then to Kulathuvayal through Palery. The road to Kulathuvayal from Padathukadavu was built, led by Janab Moythu who contributed food for the workers. Utilizing the 6000 rupees he contributed, a new car was bought from Coimbatore by Professor K. M. Chandy (former governor of Gujarat), and the bishop was taken to Kulathuvayal in that along the new road. He promised the crowd at the top of Kulathuvayal hill that he would soon give them a new permanent vicar. Fr. Thomas Ayilloor, of Thampalakkad, was appointed as the first vicar of Kulathuvayal on 25 April 1944.

Those were the days when forest fevers had their heyday, tormenting the settler community continuously. On some days there had been as many as thirteen funerals on a single day at Kulathuvayal church cemetery. In distant places graves were formed under trees and shrubs. Fr. Ayilloor went from house to house; the Koyna tablets he carried in his pockets saved the lives of hundreds.

Rev. Fr. Ayilloor established several churches for the Christian settlers, at Peruvannamoozhy, Koorachundu, Kallanode, Thalayad, and Kattippara. He also contributed to education; he started St George LP School Kulathuvayal, St Antony's LP School Chakkittapara, St Thomas LP School Koorachundu, St Mary's LP School Kallanodu.

The Chakkittappara Lower Primary School which Fr. Ayilloor established had a long and eventful history. Avadukka Lower Primary School had been the oldest school of the area. The manager of that school, Kelothu Kunjiramakurup shifted the school to Chakkittappara in June 1944. Fr. Ayilloor bought that school and renovated it giving it the new name of St Antony's LP School. Today the school is functioning in the land which was donated by Panamattathil Outha. The Kayanna Post Office was established mainly because of him. He also provided legal advice. In 1949, Fr. Ayilloor was transferred to Manathavady, and was succeeded as the vicar of Kulathuvayal by Fr. L.H Miranda from Mangalapuram, a doctor of homoeopathy. During his service the Chembra-Perambra road was opened. He was transferred to Thalasserry in 1951.

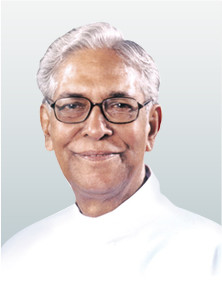
Msgr. C J Varkey

Msgr. C. J. Varkey Kuzhikulam became vicar of Kulathuvayal. During his sixteen-year incumbency several construction works were carried out in Kulathuvayal, including the church and the school. The new church building was consecrated five years after the laying of the foundation stone, in the silver jubilee year of the parish. The church building he constructed was peculiar with its balcony, priest home, and the eighty feet tall tower.

The elementary school had to be shifted from where it stood when the new church was constructed. The school became a high school on 28 June 1954. Fr. Varkey was responsible for setting up St. George's High School Kulathuvayal, Pushpa L P School, Narimada, and St. Joseph's Lower Primary School, Oonjil.

The only swimming pool associated with a school in north Kerala is at Kulathuvayal, due to Mgr. Varkey; he was a great sportsman. He bought a volleyball net and ball for Chakkittappara; annual volleyball tournaments are conducted for a rolling trophy in his name.

Fr. Varkey also encouraged and sponsored enterprises. He was behind the Oorakkuzhy waterfall becoming the source of the Kuttiady hydroelectric project that later became the lighthouse of Malabar. Fr. Varkey and Thomas Madukkavumkal photographed the waterfall; the photographs were incorporated in the report Mr. Thomas published in Mathrubhumy. The government initiated the plans about the Kuttiady project after the publication of that report.

The Sacred Heart convent on the eastern side of the Kulathuvayal hill was established mainly because of the attempt of Mgr. Varkey. He also established the Vimala Mary Congregation, which later became MSMI, which now has more than fifty branches in different places.

Mount St. George Hospital and the Georgian Institute of Commerce also benefitted from Mgr. Varkey's attention. Although they no longer exist, they served an essential purpose in their time; they disappeared only after fulfilling their goals.

In 1953, when Thalasserry diocese was established, Mgr. Varkey continued to serve Kulathuvayal. He helped the bishop, Mar Sebastian Velloppilly, to establish the Corporate Management for the schools that came under the diocese. Fr. Varkey later left to become the corporate manager of the Thalasserry diocese. Later he returned to Kulathuvayal as the director of Vimalalayam.

The initial hardships of the settlers had almost come to an end. In 1967–69, Fr. Francis Aarupara led the parish. Fr. Mathew Kottukappally was the next vicar, and he remained in charge until 1974. It was during his tenure that Kulathuvayal and Chakkittappara became electrified. The construction of the first floor of the high school including the office, and the widening of the Perambra-Koorachundu road were the major developmental activities undertaken under his leadership.

The next vicar was Fr. Kuriakose Chemblany, who remained until 1978. Fr. Mathew Panachippuram was the vicar until 1981 and Fr. Joseph Koottarappally occupied the position till 1984. Mgr. Sebastian Kanjirakkattukunnel was the vicar from 1984 to 1989 and Fr. Thomas Kochuparampil was the vicar for a short period from 1989 to 1990. During the tenure of Rev. Fr. Chemblany new rooms were built for the high school, near the ground. The silver jubilee celebrations of the school were organized under the initiative of Fr. Panachippuram, and a new hall was built as the jubilee memorial. The water supply scheme for the school was also established in that period.

The growth of the parish continued during the tenure of Fathers Koottarappally and Kanjirakkattukunnel. Both showed much interest in the development of the agricultural activities of the parish. The present Karikandanpara chapel building was built under the leadership of Fr. Koottarappally. In his time the compound wall was built around the church, and the main gate was placed. A migration memorial at Chembra was built on his initiative.

Fr. Thomas Kochuparampil only served for one year, and was succeeded by. Fr. Jacob Puthenpura. He led the golden jubilee celebrations of the parish. He was followed by Fr. Joseph Arakaparambil, who served for six years. During his tenure the foundation of a Higher Secondary School was laid. Fr. Francis Kallikattu came after him, and completed the construction of St. George's Higher Secondary School Kulathuvayal. It currently holds students in Science, Commerce and Arts scheme. He constructed a compound wall around the church, built a new staircase that would take to the front portion of the church, and did maintenance work on the church. He also laid the foundation of a renewed cemetery. Mgr. Mathew Choorapoykayil came after him and completed work at the cemetery. It was blessed by Mar Paul Chitilapally, the bishop of Thamarashery, in the year 2008. Fr. George Karukamalil became the vicar and manager of both the school and the higher secondary. Fr. George Karukamalil helped for the formation of new Parish at Narinada which was named after the first saint of India St. Alphonsa.

Kulathuvayal was declared as the one and only Official Pilgrim Centre in Syro-Malabar by Cardinal Mar George Alanchery on 28 April 2012. The Church was designated as the Shrine of St George and the Vicar came to be known as the Rector. The Madbaha inside the Church was renovated and made a vast parking area beyond the compound wall of the church by Fr. George Karukamalil as a preparation for upgrading the parish as the Pilgrim Centre. He started renovating the high school building. In 2013 Fr. Vinoy Purayidom took charge as the Rector of the Shrine of St George. He continued renovated the high school building. In May 2015 when Fr. Vinoy Purayidom was appointed as the Corporate Manager of the Educational Institutions in Thamarassery Diocese, Fr. Saji Chakkittamuri came to Kulathuvayal as its Captain. The rosary village and way of the cross was constructed under his leadership. He renovated the high school building. To begin with, Kulatuvayal was a part of Kozhikode Diocese. Later on, it joined the Diocese of Thalassery. The new diocese's first bishop, Mar Sebastian Vellopilly, presided. When the Diocese of Thamarassery was formed from Thalassery in 1986, Kulathuvayal was annexed to it.

The parish spreads through the panchayats of Koothali, Chakkittapara, Koorachundu, Perambra and Kayanna in Kozhikode district. The land is made wet and fertile by the reservoir of the Kuttiady irrigation scheme, and the Chembrapuzha that springs from Chakkittapara, flows east until it reaches Koorachundu, and then turns west and flows around Kulathuvayal till it reaches Kuttiadypuzha. There are about two hundred fifty (250) families in the parish who are mostly agricultural families.

== Devotional organizations ==
1. Sunday school

The Sunday school of Kulathuvayal was established right at the beginning of the parish. Now it has grown considerably and there are as many as 26 catechism teachers today. There are also more than 600 students going through the different classes. In order to make it easy for the children, catechism classes are being taken now at Kulathuvayal, Chakkittapara, and Narinada schools. Kulathuvayal Sunday School is one of the best in the whole diocese. The teachers there render invaluable and selfless service to the children. Among them the name of Sri T M Abraham Thoomkuzhy is to be particularly mentioned as he has been serving the parish as the headmaster of the Sunday school for more than twenty five years.

2. Mission League

The mission leagues branch has been functioning admirably with the intention of moulding young men and women who motivated in mission work. They approach every house in the parish and convey the message of Christian mission. They also teach the great value of prayers and renunciation. Monthly meetings and seminars are being conducted to develop leadership qualities among children. The members visit hospitals to console the patients and extend financial help to the needy. In the various cultural competitions held annually in the regional level and diocesan level, the Kulathuvayal branch puts in very good performance every year.

3. Society of St Vincent de Paul

The society has been functioning very admirably for the last fifteen years. There are nine active members in it today. It gives different kinds of financial support to the needy such as marriage aid for poor girls, free medical treatment for the poor, providing thatched roof for houses, and financial help for buying food or clothing, educational scholarship to pupils, etc. These are only a handful of the various activities the society undertakes.

4. Mathrusangham

Mathrusangham is functioning in an exemplary manner in the parish. At present there are about thirty members in the organization. They assemble after the holy mass on second Saturdays, and conduct Bible readings and prayer sessions. They also take up marriage help for poor girls, helping the patients, and visiting homes.

5. KCYM

KCYM is an organization that helps Christian youth to come together, and grow together. There are more than one hundred and fifty members in the organization now. Seminars and debates are held regularly by them. It is also a forum for the cultural and spiritual activities of the children. The strength and energy of the youth is very useful often in social service activities. KCYM is the strongest and the most active organization in the parish.

== St. George's Higher Secondary School Kulathuvayal ==
St. George's Higher Secondary School Kulathuvayal situates in a remote hilly area of Calicut district of Kerala state. The school was established in 1941 as an elementary school and was recognized by the government of Madras. Later it was undertaken by the Calicut Diocese and Msgr. C.J. Varkey was appointed as the first Manager of the school and was permanently recognized by the government of Kerala as per proceedings of no R/Dis/No/211/66 dated 10 March 1966 of the DEO Vatakara.

The prime aim of this educational institution was to provide free quality education to the poor and needy, especially the people belonging to Christian community which is included in minority list. The School was upgraded as Higher Secondary School in the year 2000 considering its meritorious service to the community. It is the only high school in the Chakkittapara Grama Panchayat. Around 18000 thousand students have completed the course successfully from this school so far and many of them are in high position in the society.

== Syro-Malabar religious houses In Kulathuvayal ==
1. Missionary Sisters of Mary Immaculate (MSMI) Generalate Kulathuvayal
The Congregation of the Missionary Sisters of Mary Immaculate (MSMI) was started by Fr. C.J. Varkey also known as "Varkeyachan" in 1962. At present, it has 800 professed sisters working in one hundred communities in India, the US, Germany and Italy, engaged with different apostolic activities like teaching, nursing, orphanage, leprosy center, old age homes, family apostolate, social work, pastoral care, prayer and counseling.

In 1951 the region was an underdeveloped hill area with no roads, schools or churches. Most Christians in Malabar are migrants. Migration began during the economic Depression of the 1930s and continued for decades. He started the first school in Kulathuvayal in 1954 and encouraged other parishes in the diocese to open schools before building churches. In 1976, Monsignor Varkey started the Malabar region's first charismatic retreat center that now attracts thousands of people. He died on 24 June 2009 at the age of 88.

2. Sacred Heart (S.H) Convent Kulathuvayal

== Kulathuvayal forane ==
- The King Church Muthukad (1999)
- Fathima Matha Church Peruvannamuzhy (1964)
- St. Antony's Church Chakkittapara (1993)
- St. George Forane church Kulathuvayal (1941)
- St. Francis of Assisi Church Perambra (1999)
- St Joseph's Church karikadanpara (2007)
- St. Alphonsa Church Narinada (2014)
- St. Thomas Church Koorachudu (1949)
- St. Mary's Church Kallanode (1947)
- St. Joseph's Church Pathipara (2007)
- St. Mary's Church Kattullamala (1966)
- St. Joseph's Church Kariyathumpara (1985)
- St. Sebastian's Church Kakkayam (1995)
- St. George's Church Thalayad (1968)
- Holy Family Church Kattipara (1950)
- St. George's Church Chamal (1973)

== Former vicars ==
- Rev. Fr. Joseph Peediyeckal (1941–1944)
- Rev. Fr. Thomas Ayillor (1944–1949)
- Rev. Fr. Miranda (1949–1951)
- Mgr. C.J. Varkey (1951–1967)
- Mgr. Francis Arupara (1967–1969)
- Rev. Fr. Mathew Kottukapalli (1969–1974)
- Rev. Fr. Kuriakose Chemplani (1974–1978)
- Rev. Fr. Mathew Panachipuram (1978–1981)
- Rev. Fr. Joseph Kuttarapalli (1981–1984)
- Mgr. Sebastian Kanjirakattukunnel (1984–1989)
- Rev. Fr. Thomas Kochuparambil (1989–1990)
- Rev. Fr. Jacob Puthanpura (1990–1993)
- Rev. Fr. Ephrem Pottanani (1993–1996)
- Rev. Fr. Joseph Arakaparambil (1996–2002)
- Rev. Fr. Francis Kallikattu (2002–2007)
- Mgr. Mathew Choorapoykayil (2007–2009)
- Rev. Fr. George Karukamalil (2009–2013)
- Rev. Fr. Sebastian Purayidathil (2013–2015)
- Rev. Fr. Thomas Chakkittamuriyil (2015–2017)
- Rev. Fr. Sebastian Pulickal (2017–2019)
- Rev. Fr. Roy Koonanickal (2019–2020)
- Rev. Fr. George Kalappurackal (2020–2024)
- Rev. Fr. Thomas kalarikkal (2024-) (Current)

=== Priests from the parish ===
- Fr. Philip Kanakkacherry
- Fr. Thomas Oswald Kappukattil CMI
- Fr. Jose Kappukattil CMI
- Fr. Michael Karimattom
- Fr. Sebastian Embrayil
- Fr. Thomas Vattottutharappel
- Fr. George Moolayil
- Fr. Sebastian Panamattomparambil
- Fr. Kurian Kumbolil
- Fr. Sebastian Pookulath
- Fr. James Kumbukkal
- Fr. Agustin Pattaniyil
- Fr. Varkey Cheruppillattu
- Fr. Alex kattakkayam
- Fr. Joy Ullattil
- Fr. Reji Kanjirathamkunnel
- Fr. Bino Nadakkal
