= Little Flower Forane Church, Nilambur =

Little Flower Syro-Malabar Catholic Forane Church, Nilambur
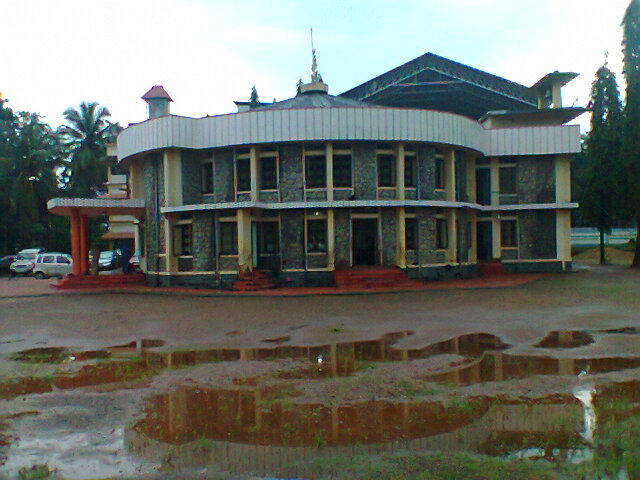
- Side view of Little Flower Forane Church, Nilambur
- Little Flower Syro-Malabar Catholic Forane Church, Nilambur
- 11°16′52″N 76°14′00″E
- Location: Nilambur
- Country: India
- Denomination: Syro-Malabar Catholic Church
- Website: http://littleflowernilambur.in/

History
- Status: Forane
- Founded: 1929
- Dedication: St. Thérèse

Architecture
- Functional status: Active

Administration
- District: Malappuram
- Archdiocese: Syro-Malabar Catholic Archdiocese of Tellicherry
- Diocese: Syro-Malabar Catholic Diocese of Mananthavady

Clergy
- Archbishop: Mar George Alencherry
- Bishop: Mar Jose Porunnedam
- Vicar: Fr. Biju Thuruthel

Little Flower Forane Church, Nilambur is a Syro-Malabar church situated at Nilambur in Malappuram district.

== History ==
The church, which was established in 1929, is under Manathavady eparchy. The current archbishop of Tellicherry Archdiocese, Mar George Njaralakatt has served as the vicar of the church from 2004 to 2006. Now, Fr. Biju Thuruthel is serving as vicar and Fr. Vinoy Kalappurackal is serving as asst. vicar of the church. There are 489 Catholic families in this church.

== Parishes under the church ==
1. Holy Family, Chokkad
2. St. Thomas, Edivanna
3. Saint Joseph, Moolepadam
4. St. Mary, Pookkottumpadam
5. Saint George, Poolappadam
6. Saint Jude, Rubynagar
7. St. Mary, Thelpara
8. Saint George, T.K Colony
9. St. Mary, Vallikett
10. Saint Francis of Assisi church, Vadapuram
