= Christianity in Karnataka =

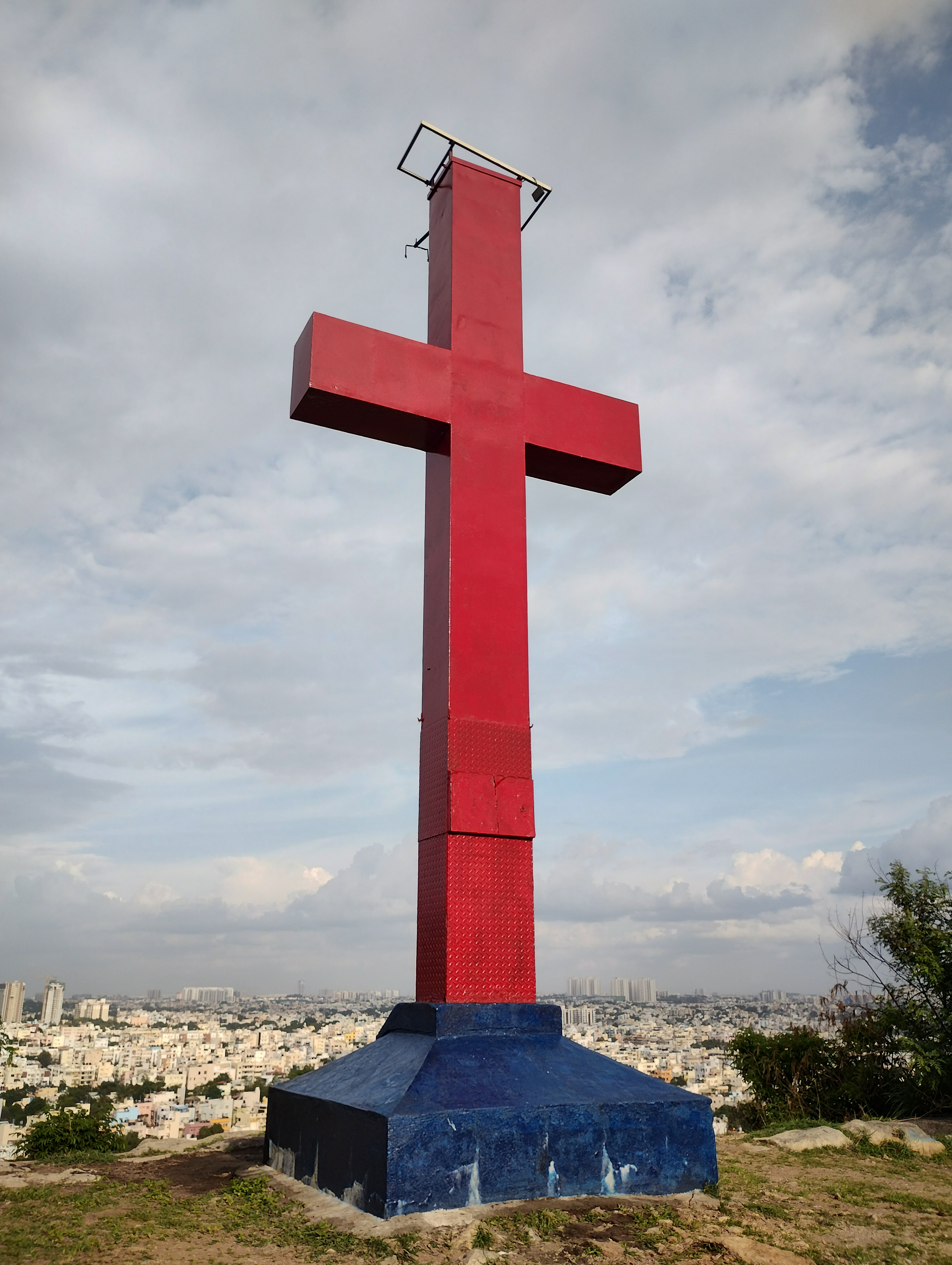
A cross in Bengaluru, Karnataka

Christianity is a minority religion within Karnataka, a state of India.

Christians in Karnataka
Year	Number	Percentage
2001	1,009,164	1.91
2011	1,142,647	1.87

Nearly half of state's Christian population is concentrated in Bengaluru Urban district. The next major concentration amounting to nearly 30% of the Christian population is in Coastal Karnataka and Coorg. The major denomination of Christians here are Mangalorean Catholics and Mangalorean Protestants They account to more than half of coastal Christian population with largest concentration in Dakshina Kannada. There are also significant Saint Thomas Christians in Dakshina Kannada and Kodagu district. Dalit Christian is significant constituent of Christian population in Karnataka and it is not enumerated and documented well.

== Denominations ==
- Assemblies of God
- Apostolic Church
- Malankara Syrian Catholic Church
- Malankara Orthodox Syrian Church
- Malabar Independent Syrian Church
- Jacobite Syrian Christian Church
- Church of South India
- Indian Pentecostal Church of God
- Hindustani Covenant Church
- New Life Churches
- United Basel Mission Church
- Methodist Church
- The Pentecostal Mission
- Believers Eastern Church

== Regional bodies ==
A Roman Catholic Diocese of Mangalore, a Roman Catholic Diocese of Belgaum, a Roman Catholic Archdiocese of Bangalore, a Roman Catholic Diocese of Bellary, a Roman Catholic Diocese of Gulbarga, a Roman Catholic Diocese of Shimoga, a Roman Catholic Diocese of Mysore, a Roman Catholic Diocese of Karwar, a Roman Catholic Diocese of Udupi are present in Karnataka. The second largest church in Karnataka is the Church of South India with Karnataka Central Diocese, Karnataka Northern Diocese and the Karnataka Southern Diocese. Gangavathi has Mennonite Brethren Churches. An Anglican Body-India Christian Mission Church has its existence in Doddaballapur of Bangalore rural right from 1920s. There is also an Orthodox Diocese of Bangalore. The state had a relatively high number of anti-Christian attacks in 2009. In 2008, Karnataka had more than 100 anti-Christian attacks.

There are three Syro-Malabar eparchies in Karnataka: Mandya, Belthangady and Bhadravathi.

== See also ==
- Christianity in India
- 2008 attacks on Christians in southern Karnataka
- 2021 anti-Christian violence in Karnataka
