= List of institutions named after Thomas More =

This is a list of legal and educational institutions named after sir Thomas More.

== Legal institutions ==
- Thomas More Building at the Palais of the Court of Justice of the European Union, Luxembourg.
- Thomas More Building at the Royal Courts of Justice in The Strand, London
  - Thomas More Courts, courts of the Chancery Division of the High Court of Justice
- Thomas More Law Center, legal aid organization
- Thomas More Society, legal defense organization

== Educational and religious institutions ==
=== United Kingdom ===
- More House, University of York
- St Thomas More’s Catholic Church, Hollingbury, Brighton, East Sussex
- Church of St Thomas More, Seaford, East Sussex
- Church of St Thomas More, Swiss Cottage, London NW3 5SU
- Church of Our Most Holy Redeemer and St Thomas More, Chelsea, London
- St Thomas More Catholic School, Bedford, Bedfordshire
- St Thomas More Catholic School, Blaydon, Tyne and Wear
- St Thomas More Catholic School, Buxton, Derbyshire
- St Thomas More Catholic School, Crewe, Cheshire
- St Thomas More Catholic School, Eltham, London
- St Thomas More Catholic School, Nuneaton, Warwickshire
- St Thomas More Catholic School, Willenhall, West Midlands
- St Thomas More Catholic School, Wood Green, London
- St Thomas More Catholic Academy, Stoke-on-Trent
- St Thomas More Church, Dulwich, London
- St Thomas More High School, Westcliff-on-Sea, Essex
- St Thomas More RC Academy, North Shields, Tyne and Wear
- St Thomas More Roman Catholic College, Denton, Greater Manchester
- Ss John Fisher and Thomas More RC High School, Colne, Lancashire
- St Thomas More Roman Catholic Church, Bradford-on-Avon, a church in Wiltshire
- St Thomas More Language College, Chelsea, London
- Thomas More Catholic School, Purley, London
- St Thomas More’s Catholic Primary School, Hampshire
- St Thomas More Catholic Secondary School, Eastville, Bristol

=== United States ===
- Cathedral of Saint Thomas More (Arlington), Virginia
- Co-Cathedral of Saint Thomas More (Tallahassee, Florida)
- College of Saints John Fisher & Thomas More, Fort Worth, Texas
- Center of Thomas More Studies, Irving, Dallas, Texas https://thomasmorestudies.org
- St. Thomas More Academy, Raleigh, North Carolina
- St. Thomas More Church, Chapel Hill, North Carolina
- St. Thomas More Academy (Burton, Michigan)
- St. Thomas More Academy (Delaware), Magnolia, Delaware
- St. Thomas More Catholic Chapel and Center at Yale University
- St. Thomas More Church (Hauppauge NY)
- St. Thomas More Church (New York City)
- St. Thomas More High School (Champaign, Illinois)
- Saint Thomas More High School (Milwaukee), Wisconsin
- St. Thomas More Middle & High School (South Dakota), Rapid City, South Dakota
- Saint Thomas More Parish, Durham, New Hampshire
- Saint Thomas More Parish and School, Omaha, Nebraska
- St. Thomas More Parish (Narragansett, Rhode Island)
- St. Thomas More School (Connecticut), Oakdale, Connecticut
- St. Thomas More School (Louisiana), Lafayette, Louisiana
- St. Thomas More School (Decatur), Georgia
- St. Thomas More Chapel in the Georgetown University Law Center, Washington, D.C.
- St. Thomas More Church (Decatur), Georgia
- Thomas More College of Liberal Arts, Merrimack, New Hampshire
- Thomas More College (New York City), a former women's college of Fordham University
- St. Thomas More Priory (SSPX), Sanford, Florida
- Thomas More Prep-Marian High School, Hays, Kansas
- Thomas More School (San Jose, California)
- Thomas More University, Crestview Hills, Kentucky
- Saint Thomas More Parish School, Lynnwood, Washington

=== Canada ===
- St. Thomas More College, Saskatoon, Saskatchewan, Canada,
- St. Thomas More Catholic Secondary School, Hamilton, Ontario, Canada
- St. Thomas More Collegiate, Burnaby, British Columbia, Canada

=== Belgium ===
- Thomas More University of Applied Sciences, Antwerp Province, Belgium.

=== France ===
- Thomas More Academia, Paris, France, https://www.thomas-more-academia.org

=== Kenya ===
- St. Thomas More Building of Strathmore University Law School, Nairobi, Kenya

=== Nicaragua ===
- Thomas More Universitas, Managua, Nicaragua

=== South Africa ===
- Thomas More College (South Africa), Kloof, Durban, South Africa

=== India ===
- St. Thomas More Church, Alakode (Meenmutty), India

=== Australia ===
- St Thomas More College, Sunnybank, Brisbane, Australia
- St Thomas More College, University of Western Australia
- St. Thomas More Parish Bateman
- Thomas More College (South Australia), Salisbury Downs, South Australia

=== New Zealand ===
- St Thomas More Catholic Church, Glenfield, Auckland, New Zealand

=== Malaysia ===
- Church of St Thomas More, Subang Jaya, Malaysia

=== Philippines ===
- St. Thomas More Academy, Bacoor, Cavite
- St. Thomas More Integrated Colleges, Tagum, Davao del Norte (formerly St. Thomas More School of Law and Business)
