= Jose Porunnedom =

Catholic bishop (born 1956)

Mar Jose Porunnedom ܝܘܣܦ ܦܪܢܕܡ
- Bishop of Syro Malabar Eparchy of Mananthavady
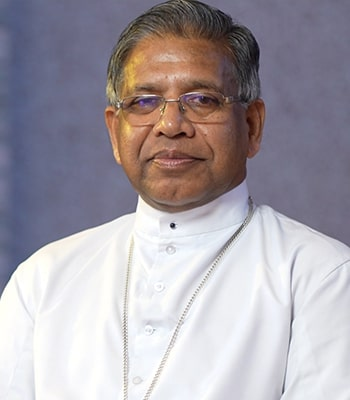
- Church: Catholic Church
- Archdiocese: Tellicherry
- Diocese: Mananthavady
- Predecessor: Emmanuel Giles Pothanamuzhi
- Successor: Incumbent
- Other post: Chairman of Syro Malabar Synodal Commission for Institutes of Consecrated Life

Orders
- Ordination: 22 December 1982
- Consecration: 15 May 2004

Personal details
- Born: March 13, 1956 (age 70) Vettimattom, Idukki District, Kerala, India
- Denomination: Syro-Malabar Catholic Church
- Residence: Bishop's House, Mananthavady
- Motto: Not to be served but to serve

Mar Jose Porunnedom (born 13 March 1956) is a Syro-Malabar Catholic bishop who currently serves as the bishop of Mananthavady Diocese. He is the third bishop of Mananthavady Diocese.

== Early life and episcopal career ==
Jose Porunnedom was born at Vettimattom of Idukki district on 13 March 1956. After completing his studies at St. Joseph's Minor Seminary, Tellicherry, St. Joseph's Pontifical Seminary, Aluva and at the Pontifical Urban University, Rome he was ordained a priest on 22 December 1982. In 1986, he went to Rome and obtained a Doctorate in Canon Law from Pontifical Oriental Institute. On 18 March 2004, Pope John Paul II named him as the Bishop of Mananthavady as a successor of Bishop Emmanuel Giles Pothanamuzhi. He was consecrated on 15 May 2004, and took charge of the diocese.
