= Nadavayal =

- Village
- Interactive map of Nadavayal
- Coordinates: 11°44′27.87″N 76°7′8.77″E
- Country: India
- State: Kerala
- District: Wayanad

Languages
  - Official: Malayalam, English
- Time zone: UTC+5:30 (IST)
- ISO 3166 code: IN-KL
- Vehicle registration: KL-73, KL-12, KL-73, KL-72

Nadavayal is a village near Panamaram,Mananthavady in Wayanad district, Kerala, India.It is one of the major Saint Thomas Christians Hub in Wayanad.

== Landmarks ==
Holy Cross Major Archiepiscopal Forane Pilgrim Church is one of the most important churches in Syro-Malabar Catholic Diocese of Mananthavady. St. Thomas Higher Secondary School is one of the most prestigious educational institutions in the district. Ozanam Bhavan of st. Vincent de paul society (The Old age Home in mananthavady diocese).

== Notable persons ==
George Njaralakatt is the Syro-Malabar Catholic Church's Archbishop of Tellicherry archdiocese.
