= Kallody =

- Village
- Location of Kerala (marked in red) in India

- Location in Kerala, India Kallody (India)
- Coordinates: 11°45′56.451″N 75°57′41.372″E
- Country: India
- State: Kerala
- District: Wayanad

Government
  - Type: Grama panchayat
- Elevation: 792 m (2,598 ft)

Languages
  - Official: Malayalam, English
- Time zone: UTC+5:30 (IST)
- PIN: 670645
- Telephone Code: +91 4935
- Vehicle registration: KL-12(Wayanad RTO), KL-72 (Mananthavady Sub-RTO)
- Coastline: 0 kilometres (0 mi)
- Nearest city: Mananthavady
- Literacy: 90%
- Major Highway: Hill Highway (Kerala) SH-59
- Avg. summer temperature: +25 °C (77 °F)
- Avg. winter temperature: +15 °C (59 °F)

Kallody is a village in the Edavaka Grama panchayath of the Wayanad district, Kerala, India. It forms part of the Mananthavady Taluk. The Hill Highway (Kerala) SH-59 passes through this village town.

Kallody is home to the St. George Forane Church Kallody, Wayanad and Chowayil Bhagavathy Temple.

== History ==
This land was divided into Edavaka and Edachena "desam". The house of Edachena Kunkan, one of the commanders of Pazhassi Raja, was located in this area.

Kallody was mainly a place where people migrated from different parts of the central-south Kerala, especially from areas such as Kottayam, Thodupuzha, and Moovattupuzha, beginning in 1940. Vettiyankal, Mathai was the first migrant to Kallody. He invited several other migrants to Mananthavady and the Kallody area. The Nadukunnel family was one of the first families migrated from Pala to Kallody.

== Etymology ==
The word Kallody is derived from the Malayalam words kallu–കല്ല് (i.e. stone) and ody–ഓടി (i.e. ran), based on an ancient tale of this area.

Long ago, the Kallody area was a forest. There was a hill named Choran Kunnu located on the banks of the Mananthavady-Pakranthalam hill pass. Thieves from this area used to attack merchants from Calicut to Mananthavady when they passed this hill pass. To escape these attacks, the travellers used to carry stones with them and start running from this area. They used to pelt stones to defend from the thieves. Hence, this place was named Kallody.

== Education ==
The Kallody area is served by several Kerala State aided schools and a couple of Anganwadis. The main schools are

- St. Joseph's Pre-Primary School Kallody
- St. Joseph's Upper-Primary (U.P.) School Kallody
- St. Joseph's High School (H.S.) Kallody
- St. Joseph's Higher Secondary School (H.S.S.) Kallody

== Transportation ==
Kallody is mainly served by the Kerala State Road Transport Corporation (K.S.R.T.C.) buses. Other than the public transport system, Kallody residents use motor bikes, auto rickshaws and Taxicabs to commute.

The nearest railway station is in Mysore and the nearest airports are Kozhikode International Airport (120 km), Bengaluru International Airport (290 km), and Kannur International Airport(58 km).

== Points of Interest ==
- St. George Forane Church Kallody, Wayanad
- Chowayil Bhagavathy Temple
- The Orapp Bridge
- Kabini River

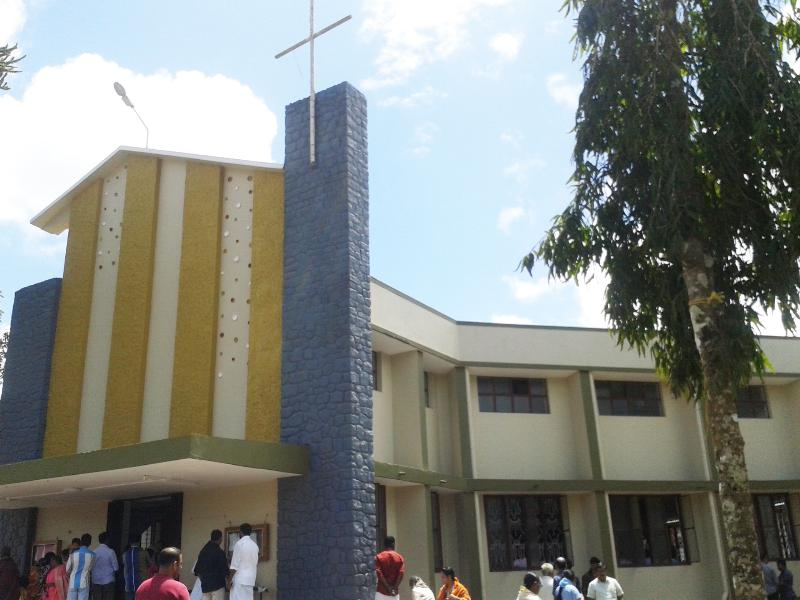
St.George Forane Church, Kallody, Mananthavady, Wayanad.

== See also ==
- Edavaka
- Kabini River
- St. George Forane Church Kallody, Wayanad
- Malabar Migration
