= C. J. Varkey =

C. J. Varkey may refer to:

- C. J. Varkey, Chunkath, Minister for Indian National Congress in Madras State
- C. J. Varkey (priest), Monsignor
