= Remigiose Inchananiyil =

Bishop of the Diocese of Thamarassery (born 1961)

Mar Remigiose Inchananiyil ܪܡܝܓܝܘܣ ܐܢܟܢܢܝܝܠ
- Bishop of Thamarassery
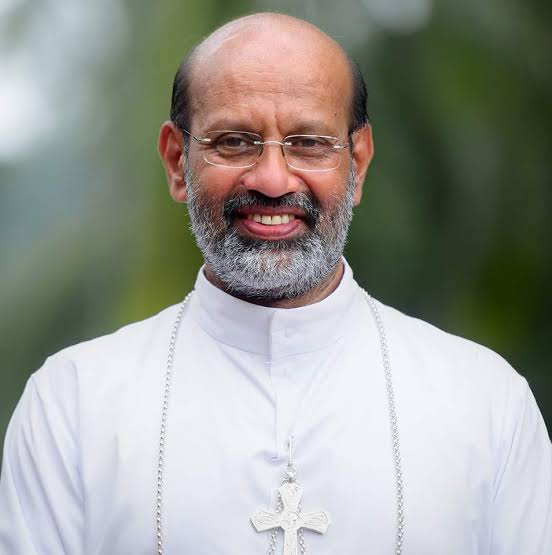
- Inchananiyil in 2021
- Archdiocese: Archeparchy of Tellicherry
- Diocese: Eparchy of Thamarassery

Personal details
- Born: 26 July 1961 (age 65) Vettilappara, India
- Residence: Thamarassery, India
- Education: Holy Cross University, Rome

Remigiose Inchananiyil (born 26 July 1961 at Vettilappara, in Malappuram district) is a Syro-Malabar bishop. He is the fourth Bishop of the Eparchy of Thamarassery.

In 2010 he became the fourth bishop of the eparchy of Thamarassery on 18 January 2010 receiving the name Mar Remigiose Inchananiyil.

== See also ==
- Sacred Heart Forane Church, Thiruvambady
