= Bosco Puthur =

Indian Syro-Malabar Catholic prelate in Australia (born 1946)

Mar Bosco Puthur
- Bishop Emeritus of Saint Thomas the Apostle of Melbourne
- Church: Catholic Church; Syro-Malabar Church
- Diocese: Saint Thomas the Apostle of Melbourne
- Elected: 23 December 2013
- Installed: 11 January 2014
- Retired: 14 January 2023
- Predecessor: Eparchy established
- Successor: John Panamthottathil
- Previous posts: Apostolic Administrator of Ernakulam-Angamaly: Curia Bishop of Ernakulam-Angamaly (2010‍–‍2014); Titular Bishop of Foratiana (2010‍–‍2014)

Orders
- Ordination: 27 March 1971
- Consecration: 13 February 2010 by Varkey Vithayathil, George Valiamattam, Andrews Thazhath

Personal details
- Born: 28 May 1946 (age 80) Parappur, India
- Education: St. Thomas College, Thrissur; Aluva Carmelgiri Philosophate; Pontifical College of Propaganda Fide, Rome

Bosco Puthur (born 28 May 1946) is an Indian Catholic prelate of the Syro-Malabar Church, who is Bishop emeritus of the Syro-Malabar Catholic Eparchy of Melbourne. Since 7 December 2023, he serves as Apostolic Administrator of the Major Archeparchy of Ernakulam–Angamaly in India.

== Early life and education ==
Bosco Puthur was born in Parappur, Kerala, India.

== Priesthood ==
After being ordained a priest of the Syro-Malabar Catholic Archeparchy of Thrissur in 1971, Puther held the following posts:

- Assistant Vicar in Ollur (1976)
- Prefect of the Minor Seminary (1976)
- Professor at St. Joseph's Seminary, Aluva (1977‍–‍1992)
- Rector of the Minor Seminary (1992)
- Protosyncello of the Archeparchy of Trichur (1995‍–‍1999)
- Vicar of the Cathedral (1999)
- Executive Director of the Liturgical Research Center at Mt. St. Thomas in Kakkanad (1997‍–‍2007)
- Rector of the Mangalapuzha Seminary (2007‍–‍ )

== Episcopate profile ==
In 2010, the Synod of Bishops of the Syro-Malabar Major Archiepiscopal Church, with prior assent of Pope Benedict XVI, selected Puthur as the Curia Bishop of the Syro-Malabar Church and of the Major Archdiocese of Ernakulam-Angamaly. At the same time, he was appointed the titular bishop of Foratiana.

Following the sudden death of Mar Varkey Vithayathil in 2011, he has also served as the Administrator of the Syro-Malabar Church and of Ernakulam-Angamaly.

On 11 January 2014, Puthur was appointed by Pope Francis as the bishop of the newly erected Eparchy of Melbourne of St. Thomas, which extends over all of Australia. He was also appointed the Apostolic Visitor of the Syro-Malabar faithful in New Zealand.

Pope Francis accepted Puthur's resignation on 14 January 2023, and appointed Mar John Panamthottathil as his successor. On 7 December 2023, the pope appointed Puther as apostolic administrator of the Major Archeparchy of Ernakulam–Angamaly.

On 11 January 2025 Bishop resigned from the post of apostolic administrator of the Major Archeparchy of Ernakulam–Angamaly and pope accepted and relieved him of the office on the same day.
