= Eparchy of Thamarassery =

Eastern Catholic eparchy in Kerala, India

Location
- Country: India
- Metropolitan: Syro-Malabar Catholic Archeparchy of Tellicherry
- Headquarters: Thamarassery

Statistics
- Area: 5,893 km^{2} (2,275 sq mi)
- Population: Total; Catholics: (as of 2004); 5,749,275; 124,664 (2.2%)

Information
- Denomination: Catholic
- Rite: Syro-Malabar
- Cathedral: Mary Matha Cathedral

Current leadership
- Pope: Leo XIV
- Major Archbishop: Raphael Thattil
- Bishop: Remigiose Inchananiyil
- Metropolitan Archbishop: Joseph Pamplany

Map
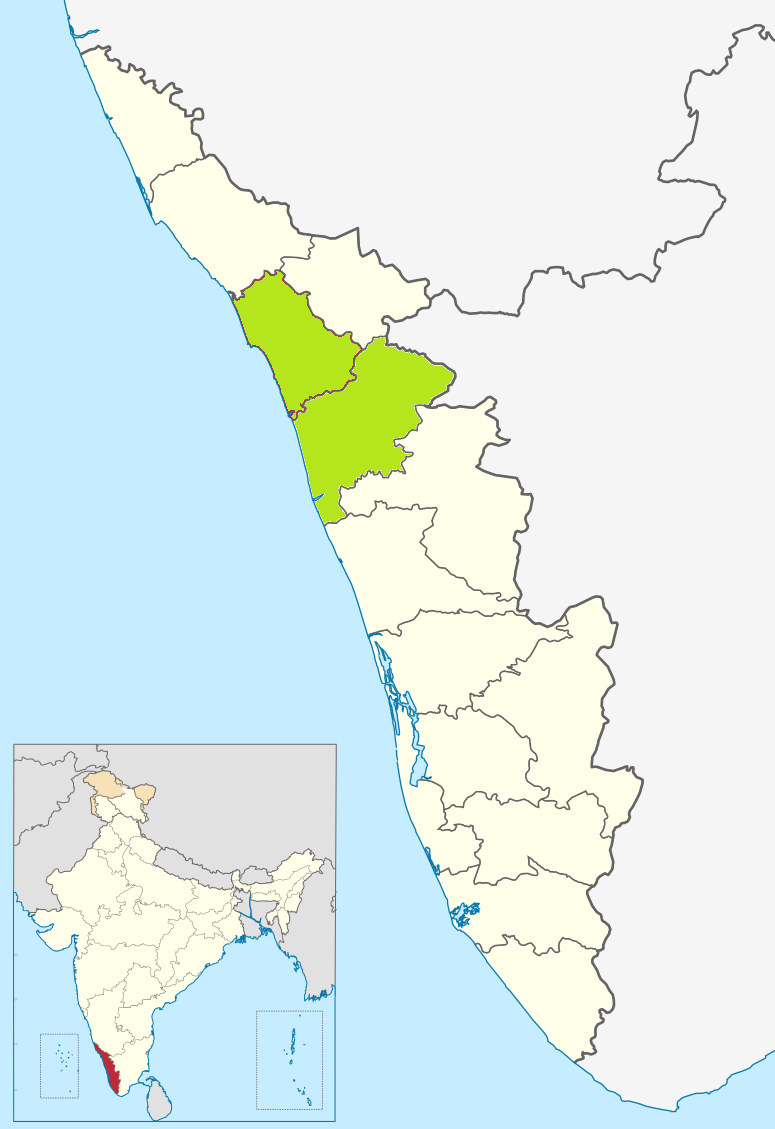

The Eparchy of Thamarassery is an Syro-Malabar Catholic Church eparchy in India, under the Syro-Malabar Catholic Church. Created on 28 April 1986, it is under the Province of Tellicherry, and governed by the Major Archbishop of Erankulam-Angamaly and the synod of all bishops of the sui iuris Church, both within and outside India.

The eparchy has several important churches, the foremost being Saint Thomas Forane Church Koorachudu, and Sacred Heart Forane Church Thiruvambady.

The current eparch is Remigiose Inchananiyil, until then eparchy secretary and chancellor, and judge of the major archiepiscopal tribunal, who was appointed on Monday, 18 January 2010 by the Syro-Malabar Synod of Bishops’ meeting at Mount Saint Thomas (with the assent of the Holy See). He was consecrated on 8 April 2010.

== Eparchial bishops ==
Sl.No	Ordinary	Designation	Year of appointment	Last year of service
1	Sebastian Mankuzhikary	Bishop	1986	1994
2	Jacob Thoomkuzhy	Bishop	1995	1996
3	Paul Chittilapilly	Bishop	1996	2010
4	Remigiose Inchananiyil	Bishop	2010	present

== Foranes under Diocese of Thamarassery ==
- Karuvarakundu Holy Family Church (1972)
- Kodenchery St.Mary's Church (1949)
- Koorachundu St. Thomas Church (1947)
- Malappuram St. Thomas Church (2005)
- Marudonkara St.Mary's Church (1939)
- Paroppady St. Antony's Church (1969)
- Perinthalamanna St. Alphonsa's Church (1995)
- Thamarassery Mary Matha Cathedral Church (1984)
- Thiruvambady Sacred Heart Church (1944)
- Thottumukkom St. Thomas Church (1960)
- Vilangad St. Georges Church (1968)

Under these 11 Foranes there are 118 parishes, 14 stations also there. Around 30,000 families & 1.30 lakhs members are there total in Diocese.

== Bibliography ==
- P.T. SEBASTIAN, The Sociology of Christian Migration to Malabar 1930 - 1980, (thesis), University of Calicut, Kozhikode-Kerala 2002.
