= Chilavu =

- Village
- Location in Kerala, India Chilavu (India)
- Coordinates: 9°53′20″N 76°47′07″E
- Country: India
- State: Kerala
- District: Idukki
- Subdistrict: Thodupuzha
- Time zone: UTC+05:30 (IST)
- Pincode: 685588

Chilavu is a small village in Thodupuzha Taluk. It lies in the Idukki district of Kerala, South India. The village is 12 km east of Thodupuzha, on the Velliyamattom route.

The main public establishments of Chilavu are Christ the King Catholic Church, Muhyudheen Juma Masjid, Sri Mahadevar Temple, St. Augustine's L.P School., BNE Madrasa and Masjidul Noor.

Chilavu is known as the 'Land of hills and natural beauty'. A post office, a branch of Alakodu Service Cooperative Bank, Chilavu Ayurvedic Dispensary, and Primary Health Centre are the main public institutions in Chilavu. It is a very small town having only a few hotels, stationery shops and provision shops. It is the Junction of three roads; to Karimannoor, Alakodu and Kalayanthani. Chilavu junction and surrounding places were main locations for the famous film "Poozhikadakan" directed by Gireesh Nair.
