= St. Thomas More Syro-Malabar Church, Alakode =

Coordinates: 9°53′15″N 76°45′32″E

St. Thomas More Syro-Malabar Church, Alakode is a parish of the Syro-Malabar Catholic Church, located in Kalayanthani, Idukki district, Kerala. It is situated in the village of Alakode at Meenmutty, 6 kilometres away from Thodupuzha town and close to the Thodupuzha – Poomala main road. It is the only church in the Syro-Malabar Catholic Eparchy of Kothamangalam in the patronage of St. Thomas More. It was founded in 1964

Karikkode and Thodupuzha, local trade centres, became the destination for many Christian migrants, notably communities at Alakode, Meenmutty and Edavetty. The Catholic faithful were served from St. Mary's Church in Kalayanthani, established in 1920. Owing to the difficulty for people to attend the Kalayanthani church, the area Catholics petitioned Mar Mathew Pothanamuzhy, first Bishop of Kothamangalam, to grant permission to establish a church at Alakode (Meenmutty). Permission was granted soon thereafter.

A person named Kuriakose from the Thurackal Puthanpurayil family donated two acres of land for the construction of a church in 1963, but the land was separated at a distance from the road used for trade in those days. The land adjacent to the both sides of the main road were part of the Mar Thoma Estate, owned by natives of Alappuzha. A ‘sign of cross’ was found on one of the stones which had been blasted for building walls in the estate. The whole faithful from this area gathered there in prayer and informed the owner of the estate about the same, and the managing director of the estate, Georgekutty Madathilakkal, donated one acre of land for the construction of the church, upon which the present church was constructed.

Rev. Fr. George Nedungattu, who was the parish priest of the Kalayanthani church in 1964, obtained permission to erect a church at the above said place, erected a temporary shed with the support of the people, and began to offer Holy Mass on Sundays. He was succeeded by Rev. Fr. Olickal, the then-Assistant Parish Priest of Kalayanthani.

The church at Alakode was raised to a parish by fixing the new boundaries bifurcated from the parishes of Muthalakodam, Kallanickal and Kalayanthani in 1967. Rev. Fr. John Kallarackal, who was the librarian of Newman College, Thodupuzha, took charge as the new parish priest of Alakode on 16 May 1970. Construction of the church was started soon after that. The present church was completed and blessed in 1975. During the tenure of Rev. Fr. Mathew Karottu Kocharackal in 2003, the church was beautified by laying marble on the floor and ceiling on top. Features including a steel flagpole, stone cross, a beautiful grotto of Mother Mary, and the large presbytery were done by Rev. Fr. Jose Pulparambil with the help of the parishioners in 2009.

This parish of Alakode has been led by 14 priests from the first parish priest Rev. Fr. George Nedungattu till the present parish priest Rev. Fr. Joseph Athickal.
