= Syro-Malabar Eparchy of Melbourne =

Syro-Malabar Catholic ecclesiastical territory in Australia

Eparchy of Saint Thomas the Apostle of Melbourne (Syro-Malabar)

Location
- Country: Australia, New Zealand and Oceania

Information
- Denomination: Catholic Church
- Sui iuris church: Syro-Malabar Catholic Church
- Rite: East Syriac Rite
- Established: 11 January 2014
- Cathedral: Syro Malabar Cathedral of St Alphonsa

Current leadership
- Pope: Leo XIV
- Major Archbishop: Mar Raphael Thattil
- Eparch: Mar John Panamthottathil
- Bishops emeritus: Bosco Puthur

Website
- http://syromalabar.org.au

The St. Thomas the Apostle Syro-Malabar Catholic Eparchy of Melbourne is a Syro-Malabar Catholic Church ecclesiastical territory or eparchy of the Catholic Church in Australia. The eparchy was erected by Pope Francis on 11 January 2014. This is the second eparchy of the Syro-Malabar Church outside India, after the Eparchy of Chicago, and it has jurisdiction over Syro-Malabar Catholics in the entirety of Australia.

It is not part of any ecclesiastical province, but immediately subject to the Major Archbishop of Ernakulam-Angamaly and depends on the Roman Congregation for the Oriental Churches. In 2021 its territory was extended to include New Zealand and Oceania. Its cathedral is the Cathedral of St. Alphonsa in the episcopal see of Melbourne, Victoria consecrated on November 23, 2024 by the Major Archbishop Mar Raphael Thattil and 20 other bishops.

== History ==
The eparchy was approved on 23 December 2013 as the Eparchy of Saint Thomas the Apostle of Melbourne, on Australian territory previously without a formal jurisdiction of the Syro-Malabar Catholic Church.

== Statistics ==
As of 2014, it pastorally served 50,000 Catholics with 17 priests (5 diocesan, 12 religious), 12 lay religious (brothers).

== Ordinaries ==
Eparchs (Bishops)

- Mar Bosco Puthur (11 January 2014 – 31 May 2023)
- Mar John Panamthottathil (31 May 2023 – present)

== See also ==
- Roman Catholicism in Australia

== External links and sources ==
- GCatholic
- Syro Malabar Catholic Church Melbourne
- Syro Malabar Catholic Church Parramatta
