= Sacred Heart Forane Church, Thiruvambady =

Church in Kerala, India

Sacred Heart Forane Church Thiruvambady

General information
- Location: Kozhikode, Kerala, India, Thiruvambady
- Completed: 8 September 1944

Sacred Heart Forane Church is a Syro-Malabar Catholic Church situated in Thiruvambady, Kozhikode District, Kerala, India. It is under Syro-Malabar Catholic Diocese of Thamarassery and Archdiocese of Thalassery and was established in 1944. It is a foranes in the Diocese of Thamarassery, constituting 14 parishes. It has 14 wards.
