= Eparchy of Mandya =

Eastern Catholic eparchy in Karnataka, India

Eparchy of Mandya & Bangalore

Location
- Country: India
- Ecclesiastical province: Tellicherry
- Metropolitan: Syro-Malabar Catholic Archeparchy of Tellicherry

Information
- Denomination: Catholic Church
- Sui iuris church: Syro-Malabar Catholic Church
- Rite: East Syriac Rite

Current leadership
- Pope: Leo XIV
- Major Archbishop: Raphael Thattil
- Bishop: Sebastian Adayantharath
- Metropolitan Archbishop: Joseph Pamplany
- Vicar General: Mathew Koikara; George Alluka

Map
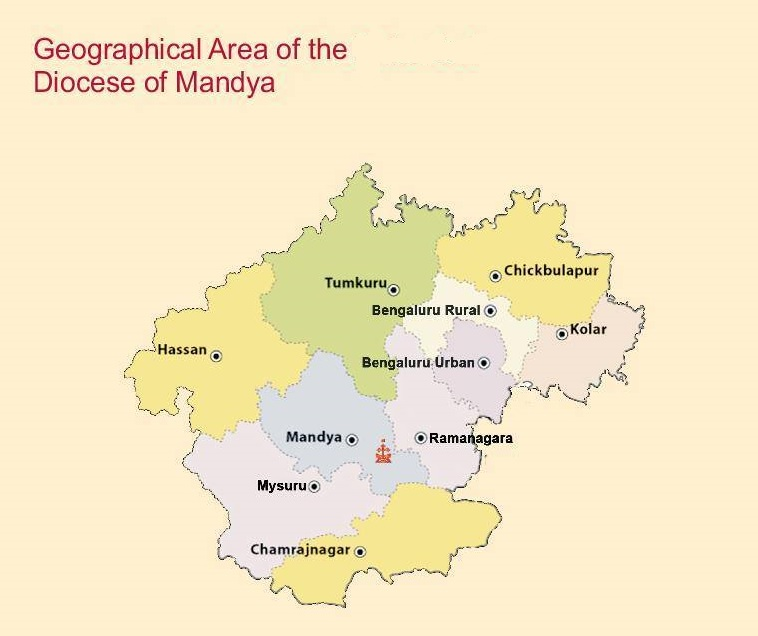

Website
- www.mandyadiocese.org

The Eparchy of Mandya is situated in Mandya city in Mandya district of Karnataka. The Syro Malabar eparchy includes ten civil districts of Karnataka, namely Bangalore, Bangalore Rural, Chikkaballapur, Kolar, Ramanagara, Tumkur, Mysore, Chamarajanagar, Mandya and Hassan. The most recent bishop of Mandya was Antony Kariyil, who was later appointed as the Metropolitan Vicar of the Major Archbishop of the Archdiocese of Ernakulam-Angamaly with the personal title of Archbishop on August 30, 2019. Infant Jesus Church, Henkel is the cathedral of the eparchy and the bishop's residence is at Kalenahalli, 6 km away from the city of Mandya.

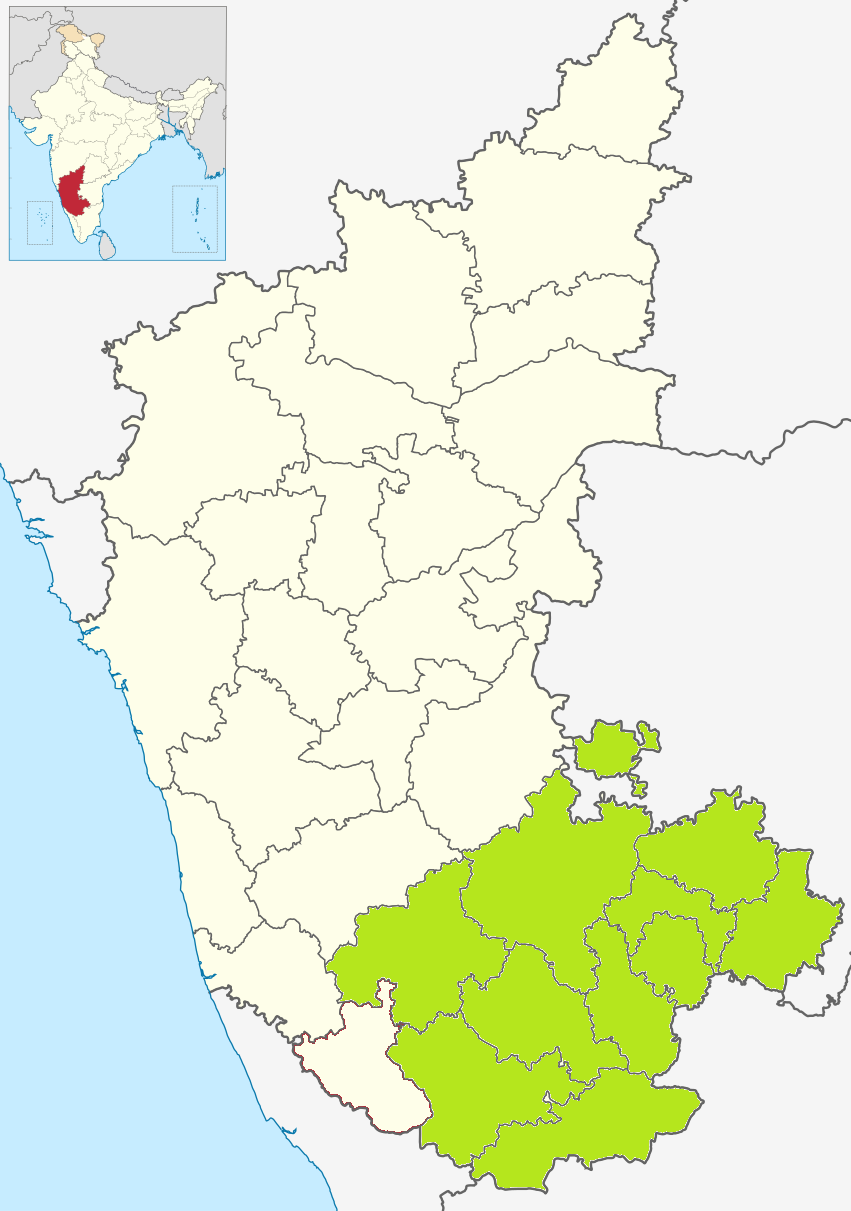
Map showing the eparchy of Mandya in Karnataka and in India

== History ==
The Eparchy of Mandya was created by bifurcating Syro-Malabar Catholic Diocese of Mananthavady. The eparchy is a suffragan eparchy of the Syro-Malabar Catholic Archeparchy of Tellicherry. The eparchy was created by Major Archbishop Varkey Vithayathil, by his decree on 18 January 2010. The eparchy has an area of 17,640 km^{2} with a total population of 44, 47,312 of which around 1,300 are Syro-Malabar Catholics.

Fr. Antony Kariyil CMI appointed Bishop of Mandya. The territory of Mandya is extended to Bangalore. The appointment was announced on 26 August 2015 at Mt. St. Thomas Kakkanad.The canonical territory of Mandya diocese comprises four civil Districts of Mysore, Chamarajanagar, Mandya, Hassan and in August 2015 it is extended to Bangalore, Bangalore Rural, Chikkaballapur, Kolar, Ramanagara and Tumkur.

On August 30, 2019 Bishop Sebastian Adayantharath was announced as the third bishop of Mandya at Mt. St. Thomas Kakkanad till then the Auxiliary Bishop of Ernakulam-Angamaly.

== Ordinaries ==
Sl.No	Ordinary	Designation	Year of appointment	Last year of service
1	George Njaralakatt	Bishop	2010	2014
2	Antony Kariyil	Bishop	2015	2019
3	Sebastian Adayantharath	Bishop	2019	present
