= Emmanuel Giles Pothanamuzhi =

Catholic bishop

Mar Emmanuel Giles Pothanamuzhi C.M.I.
- Eparch of Mananthavady
- Church: Syro-Malabar Church
- Diocese: Eparchy of Mananthavady
- In office: 11 November 1996 – 6 April 2003
- Predecessor: Jacob Thoomkuzhy
- Successor: Jose Porunnedom

Orders
- Ordination: 1 December 1964
- Consecration: 26 January 1997 by Varkey Vithayathil

Personal details
- Born: 5 August 1932 Nadukkara (in present-day Avoly), Kingdom of Travancore
- Died: 6 April 2003 (aged 70)

Mar Emmanuel Giles Pothanamuzhi, C.M.I. (5 August 1932 – 6 April 2003) was a Syro-Malabar bishop.

He was born in Nadukkara, near Muvattupuzha, India. He was ordained a priest in the Carmelites of Mary Immaculate in 1964. A botanist who lectured at Sacred Heart College, Ernakulam, he was the founder principal of Christ College, Bangalore (1969–1983) and rector of the CMI major seminary, Dharmaram College, Bangalore (1990–1996).

He was appointed Bishop of Mananthavady (Syro-Malabar) in 1997.
