= Saint Thomas More Academy Philippines =

St. Thomas More Academy
- Akademya ng Santo Tomas More

Location
- Bacoor, Cavite; Philippines
- Coordinates: 14°23′53″N 120°58′31″E

Information
- Former name: St. Thomas More School
- Type: Private
- Motto: All For The Greater Glory of God
- Established: 1990
- Colors: Red and White
- Mascot: Mustangs
- Nickname: S.T.M.A
- Hymn: "Morean Hymn"

St. Thomas More Academy is a private pre-school, elementary and high-school in Bacoor, Cavite, Philippines.

== History ==
STMA was formerly known as St. Thomas More School. It used to be located at Avenida St. Bahayang Pag-asa Subdivision, and Jacinto that is now the Jetti Gas Station. The school burned down and transferred the building near Iglesia ni Cristo church.

The academy was founded in 1990 and has four branches in the Philippines. These are Main, the only branch that offers high-school enrollees, Annex both of which are located at Bacoor, Cavite, Tanza which is located at Tanza, Cavite and the newly opened branch outside the Cavite province, Las Piñas, located at Las Piñas, Metro Manila, there is also another annex located in Molino IV in the Maryhomes subdivision, which offers Nursery 2 up to Grade 6. STMA Main also offers Special Education.
