= Kulathuvayal =

- Village
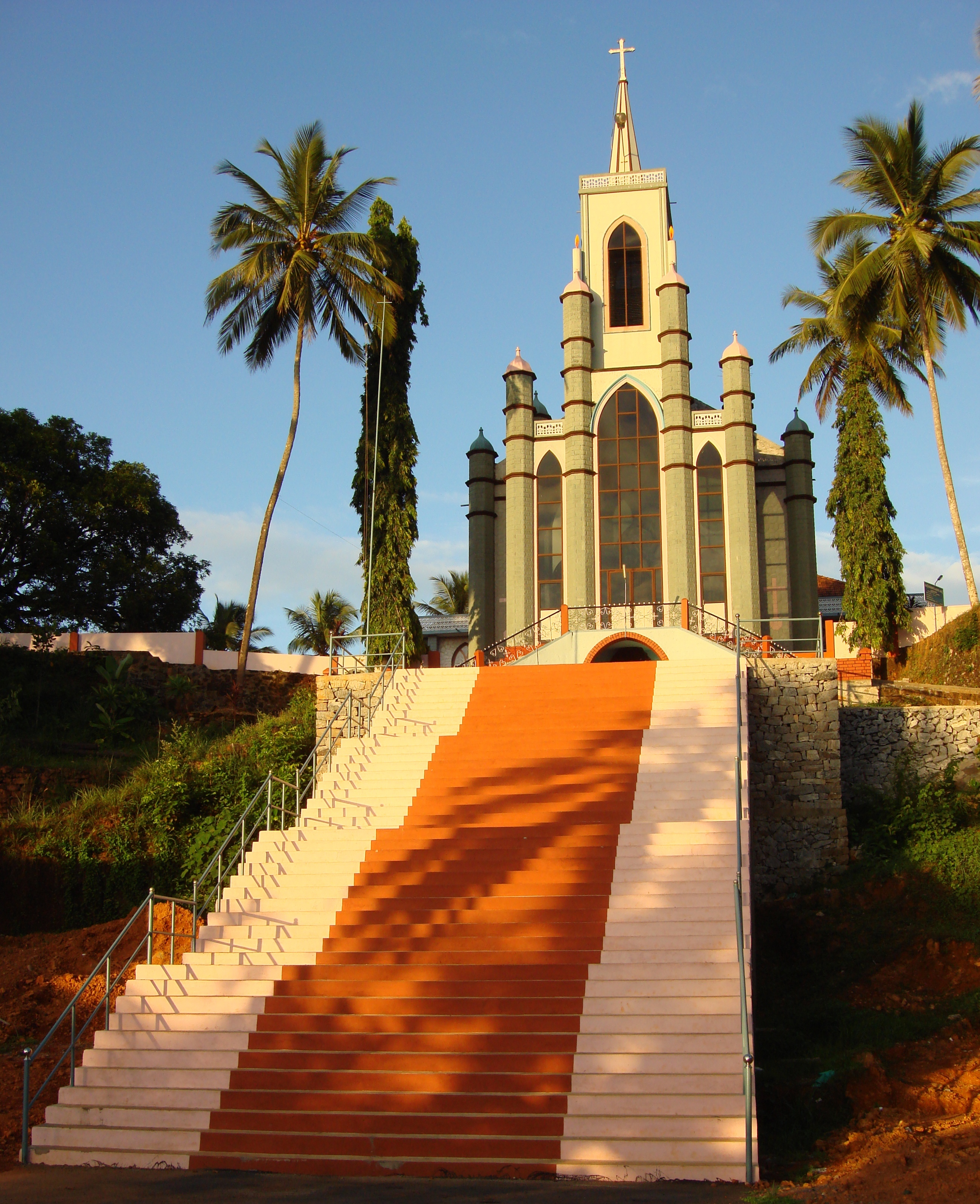
- St. George Shrine Pilgrim Centre Kulathuvayal
- Interactive map of Kulathuvayal
- Country: India
- State: Kerala
- District: Kozhikode

Population (2006)
  - Total: 63,795

Languages
  - Official: Malayalam, English
- Time zone: UTC+5:30 (IST)
- PIN: 673 526
- Telephone code: 0496
- Vehicle registration: KL-77
- Nearest city: Perambra(8 km)
- Lok Sabha constituency: Vatakara

Kulathuvayal is a place near Perambra in Kozhikode district of Kerala state, India. Administratively, Kulathuvayal comes under the Chakkittapara panchayat, Perambra block panchayat and Koyilandy Taluk.

== Climate ==
It has a generally humid climate with a very hot season extending from March to May. The rainy season is during the South West Monsoon, which sets in the first week of June and extends up to September. The North East Monsoon extends from the second half of October through November. The average annual rainfall is 3266 mm. The best weather is found in towards the end of the year, in December and January — the skies are clear, and the air is crisp. The highest temperature recorded was 39.4 °C in March 1975. The lowest was 14 °C recorded on 26 December 1975.

== St George Shrine Pilgrim Centre Kulathuvayal ==
The church named after St. George was established as early as 1941 under the initiative of Rev. Fr. Peediekkal. Janab Moythu Sahib donated 10 acres (40,000 m^{2}) of prime land at Kulathuvayal hill top for the new church. The thatched shed for the new church was constructed in no time under the leadership of Rev. Fr. Peediekkal, Rev. Fr. Mathew Kappukattil, and Rev. Fr. John Makkil. It was a modest attempt by the settlers who had been weakened by malampani. Taking a contribution of 25 paise each during prayer meetings had accumulated the necessary money. The cemetery was also established near the church by Rev. Fr. Peediekkal in 1941. In 1943 the church building was reconstructed.

== St. George's High School Kulathuvayal ==
St. George’s Higher Secondary School Kulathuvayal situates in a remote hilly area of Calicut district of Kerala state. The school was established in 1941 as an elementary school and was recognized by the government of Madras. Later it was undertaken by the Calicut Diocese and Msgr. Rev. Fr. C.J. Varkey was appointed as the first Manager of the school and was permanently recognized by the government of Kerala as per proceedings of no R/Dis/No/211/66 dated 10/03/1966 of the DEO Vatakara.

The prime aim of this educational institution was to provide free and qualitative education to the poor and needy especially the people belonging to Christian community which is included in minority list. The School was upgraded as Higher Secondary School in the year 2000 considering its meritorious service to the community. It is the only High School in the Chakkittapara Grama Panchayat. Around 18000 thousand students have completed the course successfully from this school so far and many of them are in high position in the society.

== Syro-Malabar Religious Houses In Kulathuvayal ==
1. Missionary Sisters of Mary Immaculate (MSMI) Generalate Kulathuvayal
The Congregation of the Missionary Sisters Of Mary Immaculate (MSMI) was started by Fr. C.J. Varkey also known as "Varkeyachan" in 1962. At present, it has 800 professed sisters working in one hundred communities in India, U.S.A. Germany and Italy, engaged with different apostolic activities like teaching, nursing, orphanage, leprosy center, old age homes, family apostolate, social work, pastoral care, prayer and counseling. He was one of the most admired figures in Kerala Church and a leader of the charismatic renewal movement in the state.

Monsignor Varkey, popularly known as Varkey Achan ("Father" Varkey) was based in Kulathuvayal, about 50 kilometers east of Kozhikode town, and for 58 years he worked across four northern districts of Kerala. He came to Kulathuvayal in 1951 when the region was an underdeveloped hill area with no roads, schools or churches. Most Christians in Malabar are migrants. Migration began during the economic Depression of the 1930s and continued for decades. He started the first school in Kulathuvayal in 1954 and encouraged other parishes in the diocese to open schools before building churches. In 1976, Monsignor Varkey started the Malabar region's first charismatic retreat center that now attracts thousands of people. Pope Benedict XVI gave the priest the honorary title of monsignor in 2007 in recognition of his service to the Church.

He died on 24 June 2009 at the age of 88. The funeral services were held at Nirmala Retreat Centre in Kulathuvayal. Retired Archbishop Jacob Thoomkuzhy of Trichur, Archbishop George Valiamattam of Tellicherry and Bishop Lawrence Mukkuzhy of Belthangady joined Bishop Chittilappilly at the services, along with hundreds of priests and nuns.

2. Sacred Heart (S.H) Convent Kulathuvayal

== Transportation ==
Kulathuvayal village connects to other parts of India through Perambra town on the west. National highway No.66 passes through Vatakara and the northern stretch connects to Mangalore, Goa and Mumbai. The southern stretch connects to Cochin and Trivandrum. The eastern National Highway No.54 going through Kuttiady connects to Mananthavady, Mysore and Bangalore. The nearest airports are at Kannur and Kozhikode. The nearest railway station is at Vatakara.
