= Eparchy of Mananthavady =

Syro-Malabar Eparchy

- Coat of arms

Location
- Country: India
- Ecclesiastical province: Archeparchy of Tellicherry

Information
- Denomination: Catholic Church
- Sui iuris church: Syro-Malabar Church
- Rite: East Syriac Rite

Current leadership
- Pope: Mar Leo XIV
- Major Archbishop: Mar Raphael Thattil
- Bishop: Mar Jose Porunnedom
- Metropolitan Archbishop: Mar Joseph Pamplany
- Auxiliary Bishops: Mar Alex Tharamangalam

The Eparchy of Mananthavady is an Eastern Catholic eparchy in India, under the Syro-Malabar Catholic Church. It was established in 1973 by Pope Paul VI.It Is under the province of Archeparchy of Tellicherry, and governed by the Major Archbishop of Erankulam-Angamaly and the synod of all bishops of the sui iuris Church, both within and outside India.The Current Bishop Is Jose Porunnedom.

== History ==
The eparchy of Mananthavady was erected by Pope Paul VI, by the Bull Quanta Gloria of 1 March 1973 bifurcating the vast diocese of Tellicherry. Both thalassery And manthavady diocese where erected for the Migrated People from central kerala.Population explosion and the shortage of food during the post-war period (1945-1960) induced them to migrate to the uninhabited fertile lands of northern Kerala and to some isolated pockets of Tamil Nadu and Karnataka States. These places were filled with thick forests and under the threat of malaria and other diseases. The migrated people, being agrarian, risking their own life cleared the forests and settled themselves cultivating paddy, rubber, coconut, coffee, cashew, pepper etc. Most of the Syrian Catholics in Mananthavady trace their origin to Pala and Meenachil Taluk and where part of Eparchy of Palai.There are settlers also from Thodupuzha as well as the agarian belt of Ernakulam ,Which are predominantly Muvattupuzha and Kothamangalam.

The eparchy of Mananthavady comprises the civil districts of Wayanad and parts of the civil districts of Malapuram and Kannur in Kerala, the Nilgiris district in Tamil Nadu and the districts of Chickmangalore, Hassan, Mandya, Mysore, and Chamarajnagar in Karnataka. Of these, the district of Mandya is entrusted to the pastoral care of the Missionary Society of St. Thomas (MST), the district of Hassan to the Congregation of the Carmelites of Mary Immaculate (CMI) and the district of Chickmangalore to the Norbertine Fathers (O.Pream). The Catholic population is mainly concentrated in Kerala, while Karnataka and Tamil Nadu regions are considered Diaspora. The eparchy has an area of approximately 37, 697 km^{2} and a population of 1,65,100 Syrian Catholics. At present there are 143 parishes, 17 independent stations and 37 mission stations.

Jacob Thoomkuzhy, later Archbishop of Thrissur, was consecrated as the first bishop of Mananthavady on 1 May 1973. After 22 years of able guidance, on 7 June 1995 he was transferred to the diocese of Thamarassery. The then Protosyncellus Msgr. Joseph Kaniamattam was appointed by the Major Archbishop as the Administrator of the eparchy on 27 July 1995. On 26 January 1997 Bishop Emmanuel Pothanamuzhy CMI was consecrated the second bishop of the eparchy. After the demise of Bishop Pothanamuzhy on 6 April 2003, Proto-syncellus Msgr. George Njaralakkatt was appointed the administrator of the eparchy. The present bishop, Jose Porunnedom, was appointed on 18 March 2004 and was consecrated the third bishop of Mananthavady on 15 May 2004 and took charge of the office on the same day.

The Eparchy of Mananthavady was bifurcated and new diocese, the Eparchy of Bhadravathi, was erected on 21 August 2007. The bishop of the diocese of Bhadravathi is Joseph Arumachadath MCBS.

The diocese of Mananthavady was again bifurcated and a new diocese, the Eparchy of Mandya, was erected on 18 January 2010. The first bishop of the newly erected diocese Mandya was George Njaralakatt, the later archbishop of Tellicherry.

== Ordinaries ==
=== Bishops ===
Sl.No	Ordinary	Designation	Year of appointment	Last year of service
1	Jacob Thoomkuzhy	Bishop	1973	1995
2	Emmanuel Giles Pothanamuzhi	Bishop	1996	2003
3	Jose Porunnedom	Bishop	2004	present

=== Auxiliary Bishops ===
Sl.No	Ordinary	Designation	Year of appointment	Last year of service
1	Alex Tharamangalam	Auxiliary Bishop	2022	present

=== Prelates Hailing From The Diocese ===
Sl.No	Ordinary	Designation	Year of appointment	Last year of service
1	John Moolachira	Archbishop - Guwahati	2011	present
2	Sebastian Kallupura	Archbishop - Patna	2020	present
3	George Njaralakatt	Former Archbishop - Tellicherry	2014	2022
4	Augustine Madathikunnel	Bishop - Khandwa	2024	present

== Saints and causes for canonisation ==
- Fr. Armond Madhavath
