= Edavaka, Mananthavady =

Edavaka
- Grama Panchayat
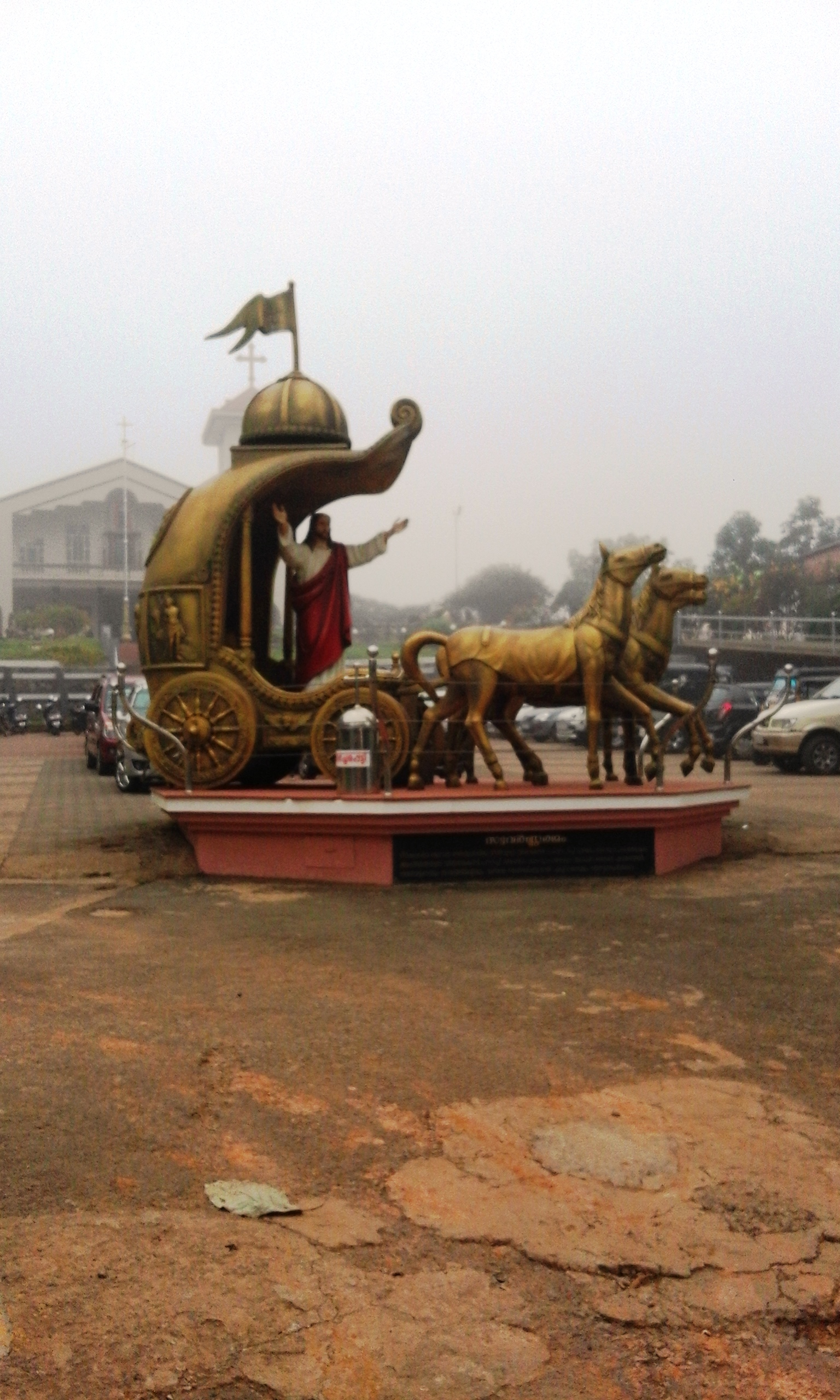

- Location in Kerala, India Edavaka (India)
- Coordinates: 11°46′0″N 75°48′0″E
- Country: India
- State: Kerala
- District: Wayanad
- Elevation: 792 m (2,598 ft)

Population (2011)
  - Total: 16,737

Languages
  - Official: Malayalam, English
- Time zone: UTC+5:30 (IST)
- PIN: 670645
- Telephone Code: +91 4935
- ISO 3166 code: IN-KL
- Vehicle registration: KL-12(Wayanad RTO), KL-72 (Mananthavady Sub-RTO)
- Coastline: 0 kilometres (0 mi)
- Nearest city: Mananthavady
- Website: http://lsgkerala.in/edavakapanchayat

Edavaka is a Grama Panchayat in the Wayanad district of Kerala, India.

== Demographics ==
As of the 2011 census of India, Edavaka had a population of 16,737, with 8,245 males and 8,492 females.

== Villages and towns ==
The following little towns and villages are part of Edavaka panchayath jurisdiction.

- Palamukku
- Pallikkal
- Dwaraka
- Nalam Mile
- Kallody
- Pandikkadavu
- Rande Nalu or Chundamukku
- Thonichal
- Moolithode
- Karakkuni
