= Sebastian Valloppilly =

Indian Roman Catholic archbishop

Mar Sebastian Valloppilly
- First Bishop of Eparchy of Tellicherry
- Native name: മാർ സെബാസ്റ്റ്യൻ വള്ളോപ്പിള്ളി
- Term ended: 1989 (Retired)
- Predecessor: Position established
- Successor: George Valiamattam

Orders
- Ordination: 24 August 1945
- Consecration: 8 January 1956

Personal details
- Born: Sebastian Valloppilly; 4 August 1911 Pala, Travancore, British Raj
- Died: 4 April 2006 (aged 94) Thalassery, Kerala, India
- Buried: 11°45′42.9″N 75°28′34.5″E
- Denomination: Syro-Malabar Catholic Church
- Motto: Servire non Servi (To serve, not to be served)

Mar Sebastian Valloppilly (4 August 1911 – 4 April 2006) was an Indian prelate of the Syro-Malabar Catholic Church. He served as the first Bishop of the Eparchy of Tellicherry (Thalassery) in Kerala, India. Often referred to as the "Moses of Malabar", he is renowned for his leadership during the migration of Syrian Christians from Central Travancore to the Malabar region (Kudiyettam) and his efforts in establishing educational and social infrastructure in Northern Kerala. His episcopal motto was Servire non Servi ("To serve, not to be served").

In 2024, the Syro-Malabar Church initiated the preliminary inquiry for his beatification.

== Early life and education ==
Sebastian Valloppilly was born on 4 August 1911 in Kudakkachira, Pala. He was raised in a devout Syro-Malabar Catholic family. He completed his primary education at St. Thomas School, Pala. He pursued higher studies at St. Berchmans College, Changanassery, and St. Xavier's College, Palayamkottai. He completed his priestly formation at the Papal Seminary in Kandy, Sri Lanka, and was ordained a priest on 24 August 1945.

== Ecclesiastical career ==
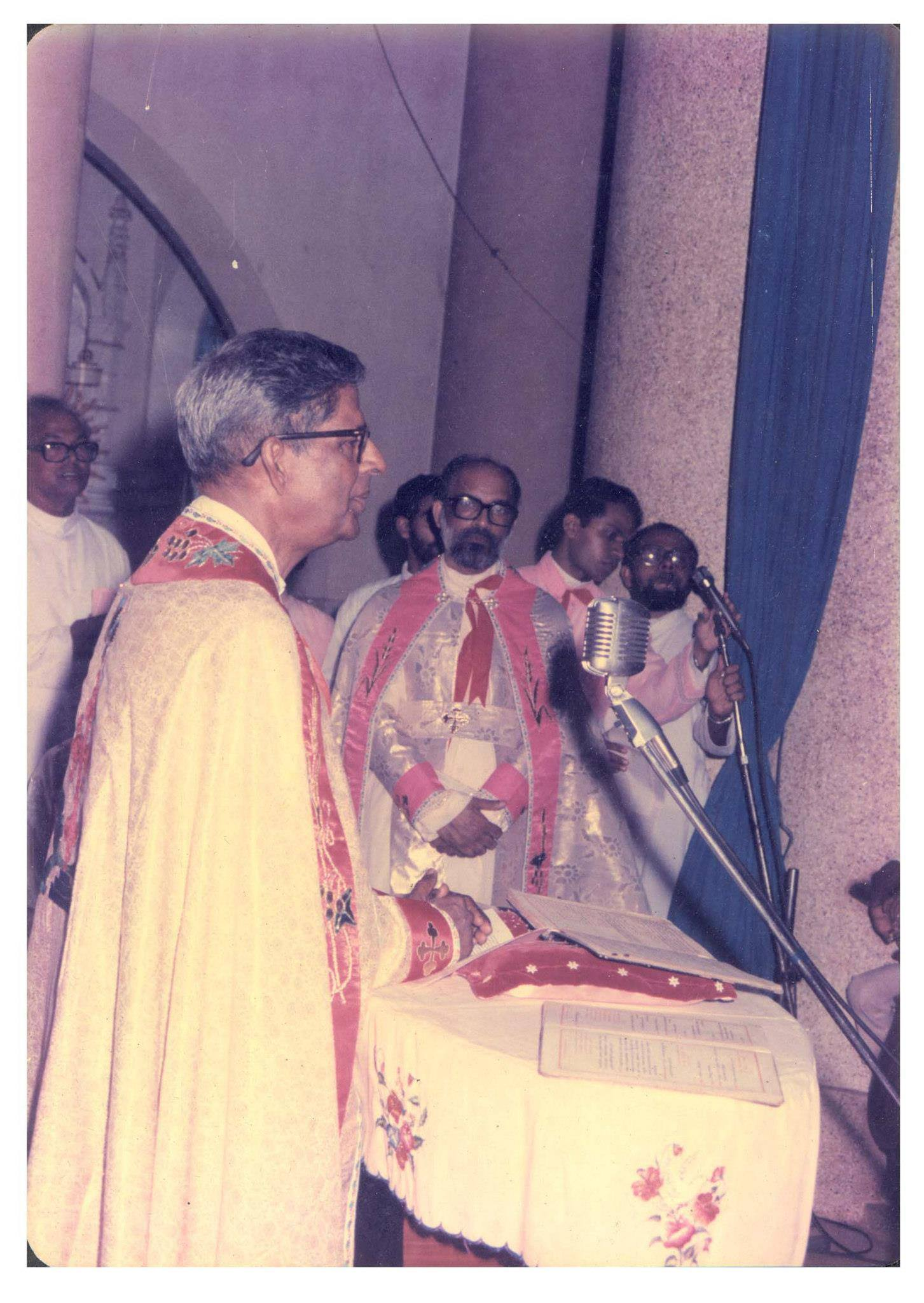
Mar Sebastian Valloppilly Offering Syro Malabar Holy Qurbana

In 1953, Pope Pius XII established the Eparchy of Tellicherry to serve the spiritual needs of Syro-Malabar migrants in Malabar. Valloppilly was appointed its first Apostolic Administrator in 1954 and consecrated as its first Bishop on 8 January 1956 at St. Peter's Basilica, Rome. He led the diocese for 35 years until his retirement in 1989.

=== Thalassery Bishop's House ===
Upon the formation of the diocese, Bishop Valloppilly acquired the property for the diocesan headquarters from the eminent jurist and future Supreme Court judge, V. R. Krishna Iyer. The property, a sea-facing estate in Thalassery, was Justice Iyer's residence before he moved to Delhi for the Law Commission. Justice Iyer reportedly sold the property to the church at cost, without taking a profit, to support the new diocese's establishment.

== "The Moses of Malabar" ==
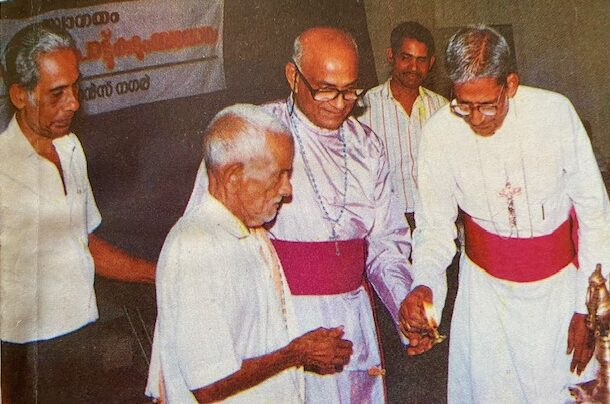
Mar Sebastian Valloppilly in a Family Meeting

Valloppilly is widely credited with guiding the Christian settlers (migrants) who moved from Travancore to the undeveloped high ranges of Malabar between the 1940s and 1970s. Facing threats from wild animals, including elephants and tigers, as well as rampant malaria and a total lack of infrastructure, the settlers relied on the Bishop's leadership for survival. He visited remote settlements, often walking miles through dense forests to boost morale and provide spiritual care.

He organized Shramdaan (voluntary labor) to construct roads and bridges, connecting remote settlements to mainland towns. This grassroots development was crucial in transforming the Malabar wilderness into a habitable agricultural region.

== Contributions ==
=== Education ===
Recognizing education as a tool for social upliftment and essential for the children of migrant farmers, he operated under the vision of "a school along with every church". He founded several institutions, including:

- Nirmalagiri College (1964)
- Vimal Jyothi Engineering College
- Congregation of the Nazareth Sisters (1975) – Founded to serve the poor and families of the region.

=== 1971 Thalassery Riots ===
During the communal riots of 1971 in Thalassery, Bishop Valloppilly played a key role in maintaining peace. A staunch patriot and believer in secularism, he opened churches and schools to shelter victims of violence, regardless of their religious background. He worked alongside civil authorities and leaders of other faiths to de-escalate tensions in the region.

=== Gandhian Philosophy ===
A follower of Mahatma Gandhi, Valloppilly advocated for a simple lifestyle and wore Khadi. He was a vocal proponent of the Temperance movement in India, leading campaigns against alcoholism in the Malabar region to protect the economic stability of settler families.

== Death and legacy ==
Mar Sebastian Valloppilly died on 4 April 2006, aged 94. He was buried at St. Joseph's Cathedral, Thalassery.

In recognition of his contribution to the development of the region's infrastructure, the Government of Kerala renamed the historic Holloway Road in Thalassery to Bishop Valloppilly Road.

=== Beatification ===
In 2024, the Syro-Malabar Church officially initiated the inquiry for his beatification, a significant step toward his potential canonization as a saint.
