= Kalayanthani =

- town
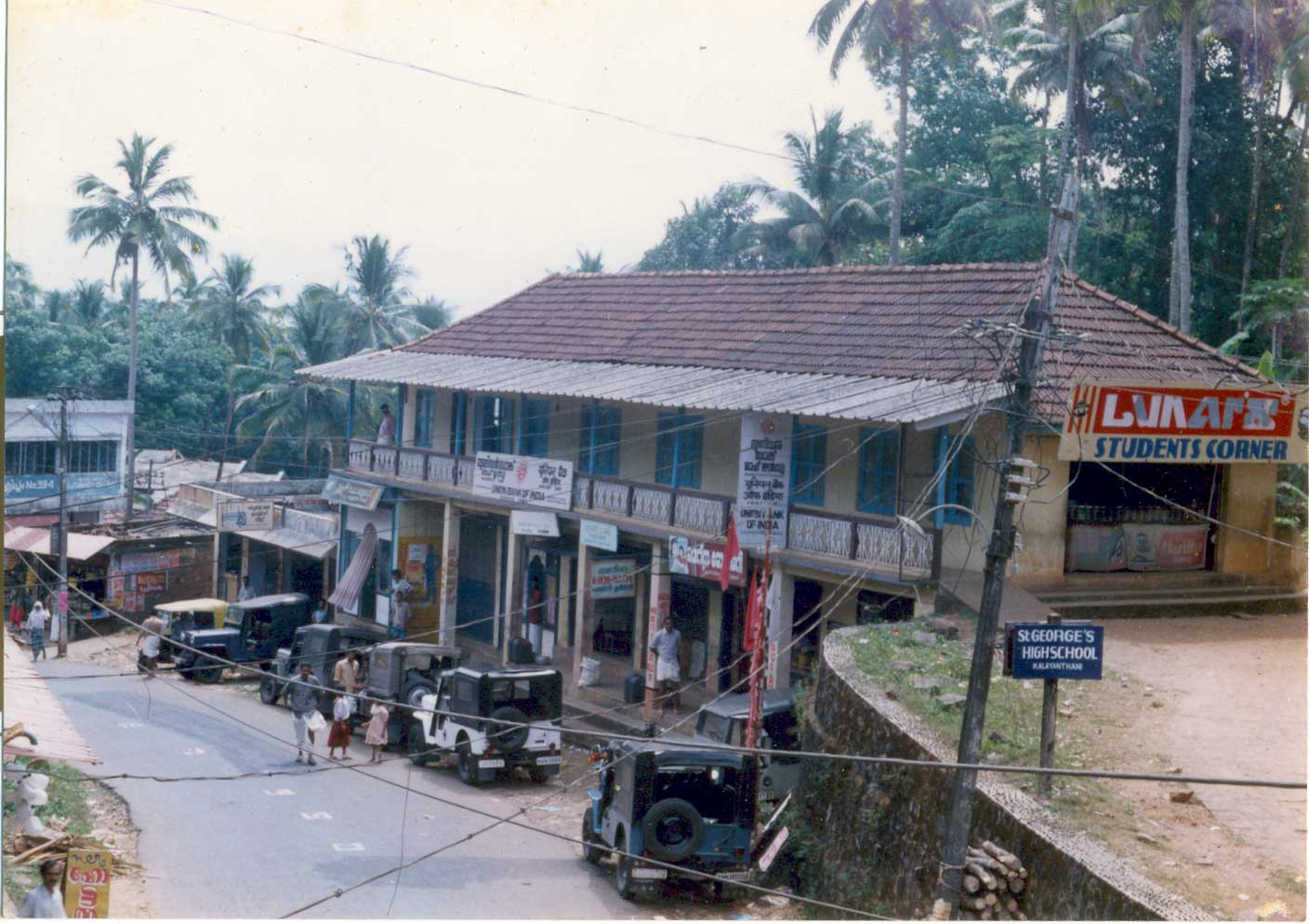
- Kalayanthani Town in 1999
- Interactive map of Kalayanthani
- Coordinates: 9.9000°N 76.7170°E
- Country: India
- State: Kerala
- District: Idukki

Government
  - Type: Panchayati Raj (India)
- Elevation: 22 m (72 ft)

Languages
  - Official: Malayalam, English
- Time zone: UTC+5:30 (IST)
- PIN: 685588
- Telephone code: 914862
- Vehicle registration: KL-38

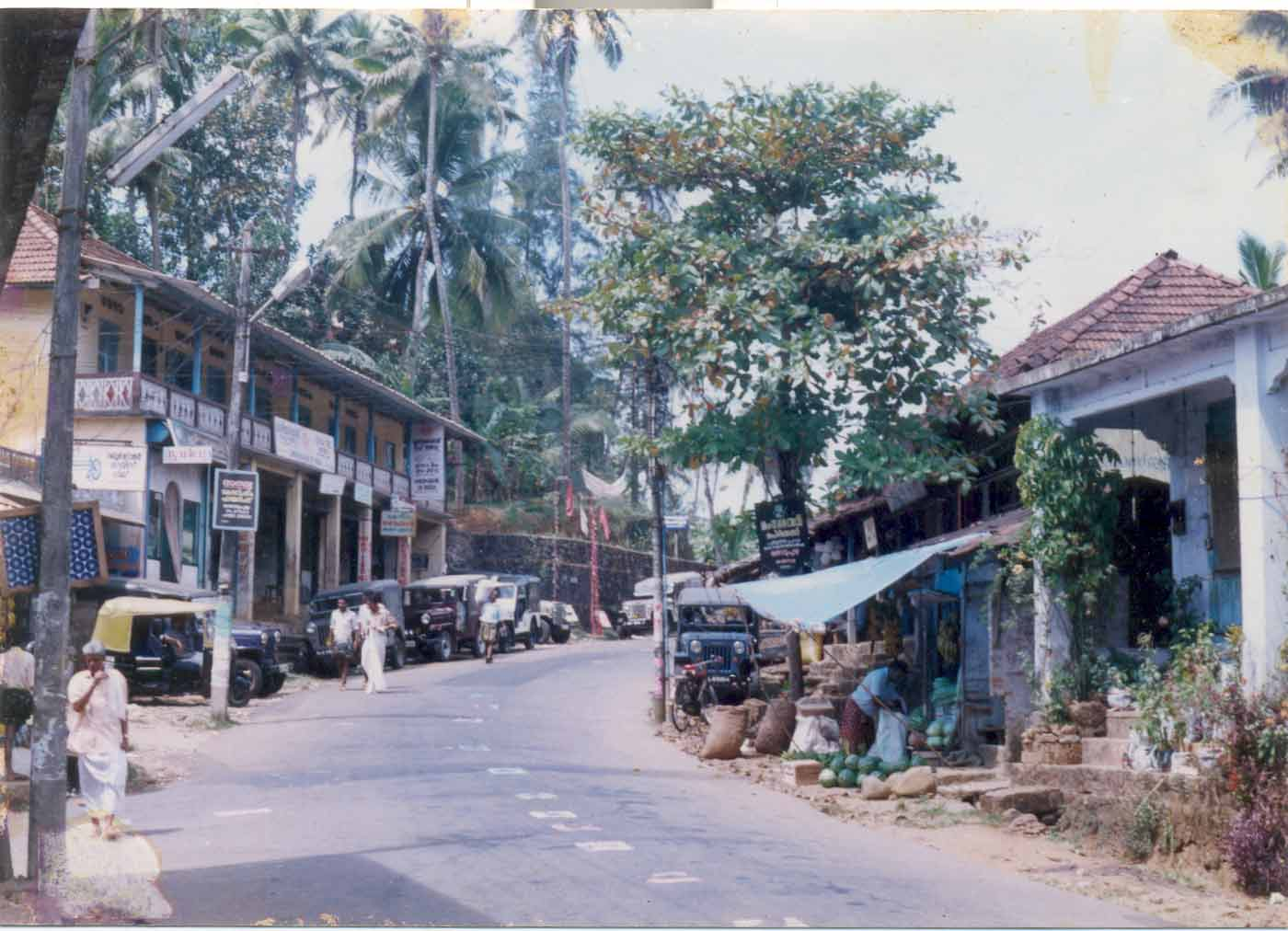

Kalayanthani is a small town in Thodupuzha Taluk. It lies in the Idukki district of Kerala, India. The village is 9 km east of Thodupuzha, on the Velliyamattom route.

Kalayanthani is the meeting point of the Alakode and Velliamattom village Panchayats.

The main public establishments of Kalayanthani are St. Mary's Catholic Church (1920), the famous Muslim Mosque Konthalapally, St. George's High School., Yugasilpi Arts and Sports Club and Viswadeepthi library.

The current Kaikaran of St. Mary’s Catholic Church is Jose Varghese Pallickamyalil.

Kalayanthani is known as the 'Land of Art'. Inspector General of Police Tomin Thachankary, well known lyricist Baby John Kalayanthani, popular novelist, cartoonist and freelance journalist Ignatious Kalayanthani, famous artist and playwright Skylark (K.O. Varkey) and senior Journalist Roy Mathew Pallickamyalil and Joe Joseph Lijo were all born in Kalayanthani.

A post office, a branch of Union bank, Urban Bank, Alakode service Cooperative Bank, and a primary health center are the main public institutions in Kalayanthani.

The main public establishments of Kalayanthani are St. Mary's Catholic Church (1920), the famous Muslim Mosque Konthalapally, St. George's High School., Yugasilpi Arts and Sports Club and Viswadeepthi library. It is a very small town having only a few hotels, textile shops, stationary shops, provision shops, and hardware shops. It is the Junction of two roads: one to Chilavu and the other to Vettimattam.

The famous oil palm plantation (Ennappanathottam) of Agriculture Department is located at Vettimattam, which is two kilometers away from the town of Kalayanthani.

== Name ==
'Kalayam' is the old Malayalam word for 'kalasham' meaning small pot. 'Thani' is a derivative of the Sanskrit word 'Sthani' meaning man in position . Therefore, 'Kalayanthani' means the one who occupies the position of a Kalasham. This is the title of the person who pours the liquor pot for Theyyam.

== Demographics ==
Malayalam is the Local Language here.

=== Religion ===
Kalayanthani has all communities (Syrian Christians, Hindus, Muslims) however the Syrian Christians holds the majority.

== Education ==
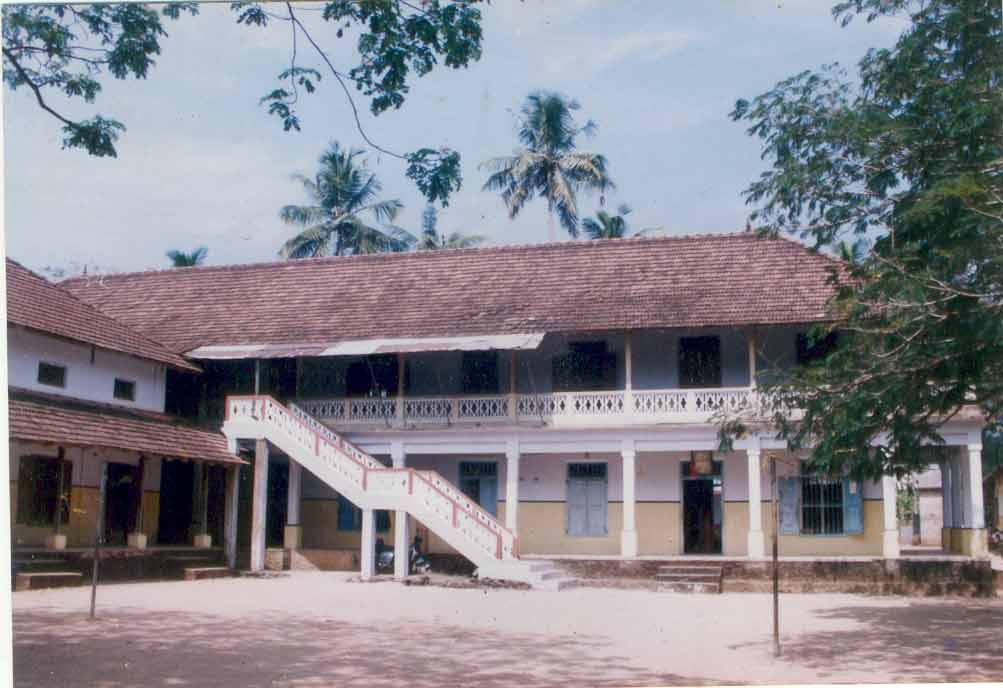
St.George's High School

Kalayanthani has a high school (St. George's high school), managed by the Syro-Malabar Catholic Eparchy of Kothamangalam and it is headed by the senior most teacher as Headmaster, which is really a benefit to the nearby villages.

== Economy and Infrastructure ==
Most of the people in Kalayanthani are farmers. They farm Rubber, Rice, Pepper, Ginger etc. There are number of people working abroad as Nurse, Engineer, Technicians, govt employees.
