= Eparchy of Bhadravathi =

Eastern Catholic eparchy in Karnataka, India

Location
- Country: India
- Ecclesiastical province: Syro-Malabar Catholic Archeparchy of Tellicherry

Statistics
- Area: 8,465 km^{2} (3,268 sq mi)
- Population: Total; Catholics: (as of 2012); 1,709,000; 9,391 (0.5%)
- Parishes: 24

Information
- Denomination: Catholic Church
- Sui iuris church: Syro-Malabar Church
- Rite: East Syriac Rite
- Established: 29 August 2007
- Cathedral: Little Flower Cathedral in Narasimharajapura
- Patron saint: Saint Joseph

Current leadership
- Pope: Leo XIV
- Major Archbishop: Mar Raphael Thattil
- Bishop: Mar Joseph Erumachadath
- Metropolitan Archbishop: Mar Joseph Pamplany
- Vicar General: Joseph Valiaparambil

Map
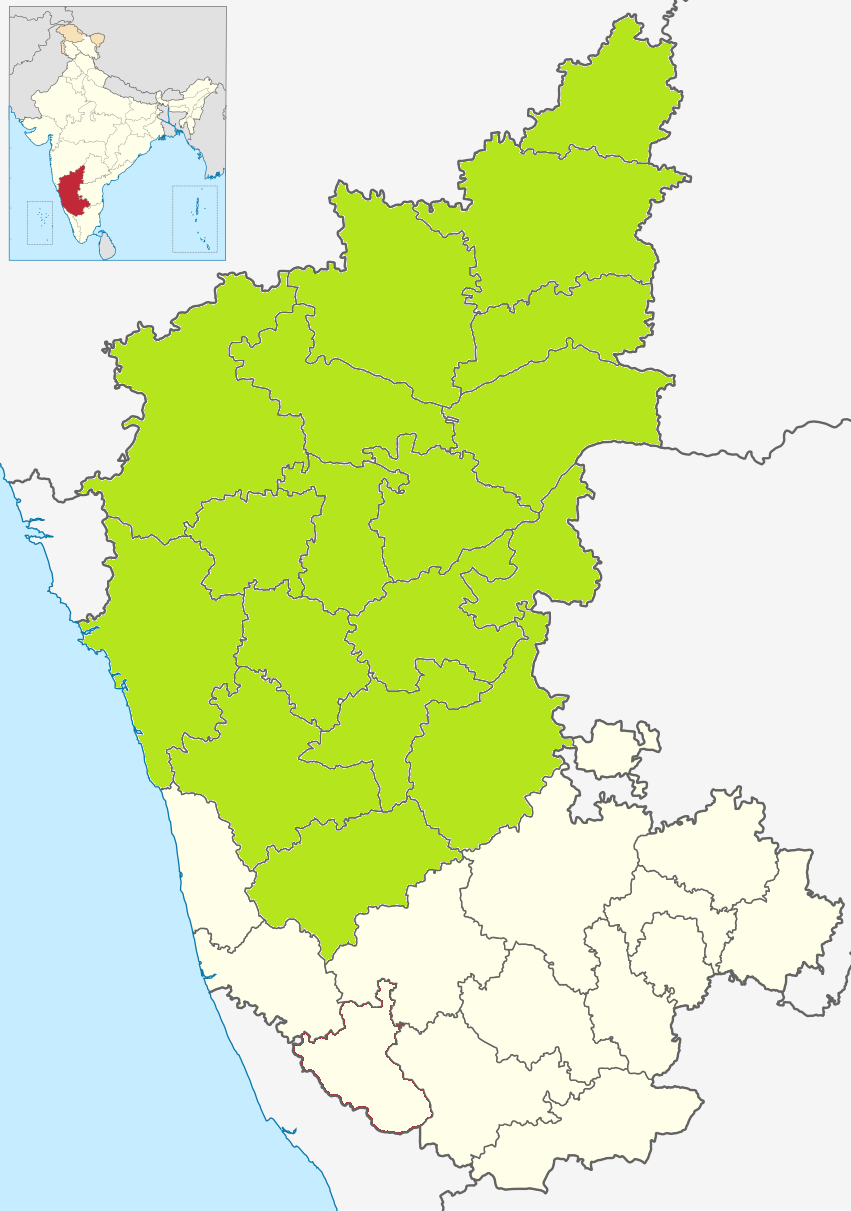

Website
- Website of the Diocese

The Eparchy of Bhadravathi was created by Benedict XVI's Papal bull "Cum Ampla" as a suffragan of the Syro-Malabar Catholic Archeparchy of Tellicherry. The territory of the diocese of Bhadravathi thus includes two civil districts of Karnataka State - Shimoga and Chikmagalur.
