= C. J. Varkey (priest) =

Monsignor C. J. Varkey Kuzhikulam (1921–2009), also popularly known as "Varkeyachan" ("Father" Varkey), was an Indian priest of the Syro-Malabar Catholic Church and the founder of the Congregation of the Missionary Sisters of Mary Immaculate (MSMI) in 1962. The family apostolate is its charism. At present, the congregation has 800 professed sisters working in one hundred communities in India, United States, Germany and Italy, engaged with different apostolic activities like teaching, nursing, orphanage, leprosy center, old age homes, family apostolate, social work, pastoral care, prayer and counselling. He was one of the most admired figures in the Kerala Church and a leader of the charismatic renewal movement in the state.

== Biography ==
Varkey born in Kuzhikulam family Valavoor, PALA and lived in Kulathuvayal, 50 kilometers east of Kozhikode town. He worked within the four districts of Kerala for 58 years. He came to Kulathuvayal in 1951 when the region was an underdeveloped hill area with no roads, schools or churches. Most Christians in Malabar are migrants. Migration began during the economic Depression of the 1930s and continued for decades. He started the first school in Kulathuvayal in 1954 and encouraged other parishes in the diocese to open schools before building churches. In 1976, Monsignor Varkey started the Malabar region's first charismatic retreat center, it currently attracts thousands of people. Pope Benedict XVI gave the priest the honorary title of monsignor in 2007 in recognition of his service to the Church.

He died on 24 June 2009, at the age of 88. The funeral services were held at the Nirmala Retreat Centre in Kulathuvayal. Retired Archbishop Jacob Thoomkuzhy of Trichur, Archbishop George Valiamattam of Tellicherry and Bishop Lawrence Mukkuzhy of Belthangady joined Bishop Chittilappilly at the services, along with hundreds of priests and nuns.
