= George Njaralakatt =

Syro-Malabar Catholic Archbishop in India

Mar George Njaralakatt ܡܪܝ ܓܝܘܪܓܝܣ
- Archbishop Emeritus Tellicherry
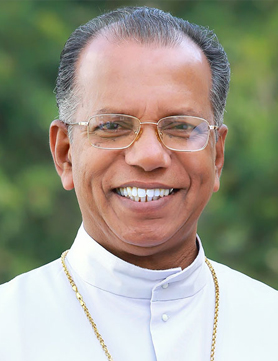
- Church: Syro Malabar Catholic Church
- Archdiocese: Tellicherry
- Elected: 29 August 2014
- In office: 30 October 2014 – 15 January 2022
- Retired: 15 January 2022
- Predecessor: George Valiamattam
- Successor: Joseph Pamplany
- Previous posts: Bishop of Mandya; Vicar General Diocese of Bhadravathy

Orders
- Ordination: 20 December 1971 by Sebastian Vallopilly
- Consecration: 7 April 2010
- Rank: Metropolitan Archbishop

Personal details
- Born: 23 June 1946 (age 80) Kalayanthani, Thodupuzha, Idukki District, Kerala, India
- Residence: Bishop's House, Tellicherry
- Education: St. Joseph’s Pontifical Seminary, Mangalapuzha; University of Mysore; Pontifical Salesian University, Rome

George Njaralakatt (born 23 June 1946) is an archbishop of the Syro-Malabar Church who was the Metropolitan Archbishop of the Archdiocese of Tellicherry from 2014 until his retirement on 15 January 2022. He was also the first Bishop of the Diocese of Mandya.

== Early life ==
George Njaralakatt was born to Varkey and Mary Njaralakatt on 23 June 1946 at Kalayanthani in Thodupuzha Taluk in Idukki District. His LP School studies were at St. Josephs School, Arakuzha and he completed UP at St. Marys High School near Muvattupuzha. His family migrated to Malabar in 1960 and settled in Nadavayal, Wayanad, where he completed high school studies at St. Thomas High School, Nadavayal. After high school he joined St. Joseph's Minor Seminary Thalasserry, Tellicherry, later on he completed his philosophy and theology at St. Joseph's Pontifical Seminary, Mangalapuzha, Aluva, achieved a BA degree at Mysore University. He also holds a Licentiate in Catechetical Theology from Salesian Pontifical University, Rome.

== Priesthood ==
After completing college studies, he joined St. Joseph's Minor Seminary in Thalasserry in 1963. He was ordained a priest on 20 December 1971 at Thalassery and worked in various roles in the archdiocese, including a tenure as Vicar General of the Diocese of Bhadravathi. From 2007 to 2010, he was the Vicar of St. Mary's Forane Church, Arakuzha.

== As a bishop ==
=== Bishop of Mandya (2010–2014) ===
On 18 January 2010, he was appointed the Bishop of the newly erected Diocese of Mandya, in Karnataka and was consecrated on 7 April 2010 at the Infant Jesus Cathedral Church at Hinkal, Mysore.

=== Archbishop of Thalassery (2014–2022) ===
On 30 October 2014, he was raised as the Archbishop of Archdiocese of Tellicherry at St. Joseph's Cathedral, Tellicherry.
