= George Valiamattam =

Indian Eastern Catholic bishop

Mar George Valiamattam
- Archeparch Emeritus of Tellicherry
- George Valiamattam (left) with archbishops
- Church: Syro-Malabar Catholic Church
- Archdiocese: Archeparchy of Tellicherry
- In office: 18 February 1989 – 29 August 2014
- Predecessor: Sebastian Valloppilly
- Successor: George Njaralakatt

Orders
- Ordination: 30 November 1963 by Sebastian Valloppilly
- Consecration: 1 May 1989 by Antony Padiyara

Personal details
- Born: 16 September 1938 (age 88) Punnathura, Kottayam, Travancore, British Raj, British Empire

Mar George Valiamattam (born 16 September 1938) is an East Syriac Catholic Archbishop Emeritus. He was born at Punnathura, Kottayam, Kerala, India. He was appointed as the second bishop of Archdiocese of Tellicherry, upon the retirement of Mar Sebastian Valloppilly on 1 May 1989. He was promoted to the post of Metropolitan Archbishop in 1995.

He served as the head of the Archdiocese for 25 years and retired in 2014.
