= Joseph Pamplany =

Eastern Catholic archbishop in India

Mar Joseph Pamplany
- Archbishop of Tellicherry; Vicar of Major Archbishop for the Archeparchy of Ernakulam–Angamaly
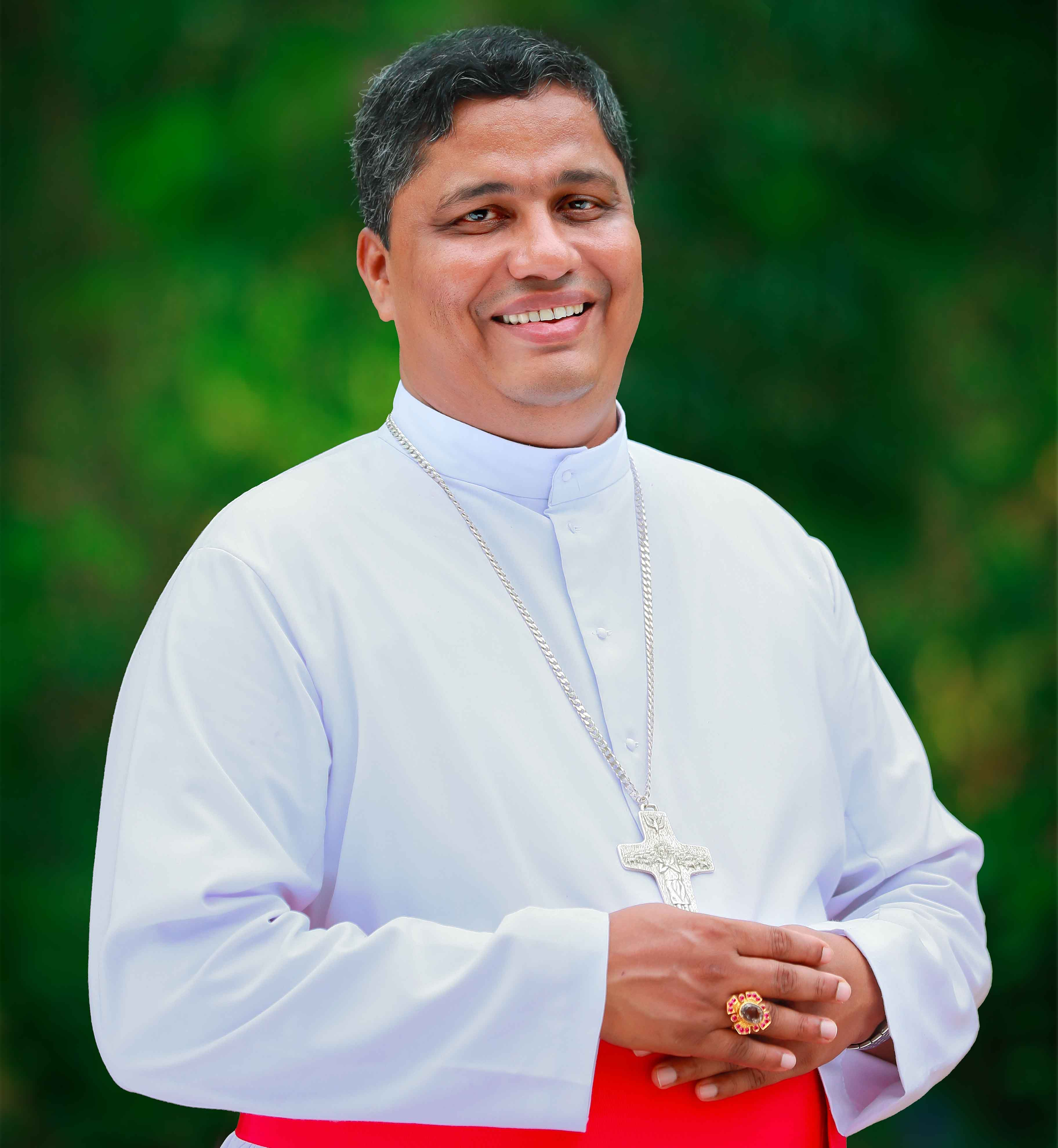
- Native name: ܡܪ ܝܘܣܦ ܦܡܦܠܢܝ
- Church: Syro Malabar Church
- See: Tellicherry
- Elected: 15 January 2022
- Installed: 20 April 2022
- Predecessor: George Njaralakatt as Archbishop of Tellicherry; Antony Kariyil as Vicar of the Major Archbishop for the Archeparchy of Ernakulam–Angamaly
- Other posts: Secretary of the Synod of the Syro Malabar Church (2022‍–‍present); Chancellor of the Alpha Institute of Theology (Pseudo-university), Thalassery
- Previous post: Auxiliary Bishop of Tellicherry (2017‍–‍2022)

Orders
- Ordination: 30 December 1997 by George Valiamattam
- Consecration: 8 November 2017 by George Njaralakatt

Personal details
- Born: 11 December 1969 (age 56) Charal, Kannur, Kerala, India
- Motto: Non Nisi Te Domine (Latin for 'Nothing Except You, Lord')

Ordination history
History
Priestly ordination
- Ordained by: George Valiamattam
Episcopal consecration
- Principal consecrator: George Njaralakatt
- Co-consecrators: George Valiamattam, Joseph Kallarangatt
Episcopal succession
Bishops consecrated by Joseph Pamplany as principal consecrator
- Alex Tharamangalam: 2022

Joseph Pamplany

Academic background
- Education: KU Leuven (PhD, Biblical Studies)
- Thesis: Crossing the Abysses: An Exegetical Study of John 20:19-29 in the Light of the Johannine Notion of Discipleship (2006)
- Doctoral advisor: Reimund Bieringer

Joseph Pamplany (born 11 December 1969) is an Indian archbishop of the Syro-Malabar Church serving in double role as the Archbishop of Tellicherry since 2022 and as the vicar of the major archbishop for the Archeparchy of Ernakulam–Angamaly since January 2025. Pope Francis announced his approval of his election by Synod of Bishops of the Syro-Malabar Church as archbishop on January 15, 2022, replacing George Njaralakatt. He was also elected the synod's secretary replacing Antony Kariyil. He previously served as the Archdiocese of Tellicherry's auxiliary bishop.

== Early life and priesthood ==
=== Childhood and education ===
Pamplany was born on December 11, 1969, in Charal, Kannur district, Kerala to Thomas and Mary Pamplany, as the fifth of seven children. He went to St. Sebastian’s School, Charal and St. Thomas High School, Kilianthara. He then went to Nirmalagiri College, Kuthuparamba for a Pre-degree before deciding his vocation as a Priest. In 1988, He joined the St. Joseph's Minor Seminary in Tellicherry to begin his priestly formation and completed it at St. Joseph’s Pontifical Seminary, Aluva. George Valiamattam ordained him a Priest for the Archdiocese at St. Joseph's Cathedral on December 30, 1997. After a few years as a Priest, He was sent for further studies. In 2001, He obtained a Master of Arts in Religious Studies from Katholike Universiteit Leuven in Belgium. He continued his education there for a Licentiate and Ph.D. in Sacred Scripture in 2006. He also holds a P.G Diploma in German, Hebrew and Greek

=== Priestly ministry ===
Pamplany began his Priesthood as the assistant vicar of St. Joseph’s Forane Church, Peravoor before becoming the vicar of St. Thomas Church, Deepagiri. After he returned from his studies in Belgium, He was appointed by George Valiamattam as the Archdiocese's Bible Apostolate Director and founded the Alpha Institute of Theology and Science to help form the theological formation of lay people in the archdiocese and was the founder-director.

He also became a professor at various colleges, including teaching sacred scripture in St. Joseph’s Pontifical Institute, Aluva, Good Shepherd Major Seminary, Kunnoth, St. Peter’s Seminary, Bangalore, and Divine Bible College, Muringoor and also serving as a research guide.

Pamplany has published more than 30 books and has conducted 40 research articles in his career along with 250 articles in Malayalam Newspapers serving on editorial boards of many of academic journals. Pamplany also served as a retreat preacher in India and the various disapora of the Syro Malabar Church.

He has also served in various bishop conferences as a priest including

- Catholic Bishops' Conference of India: Secretary of the Commission for Doctrine and Secretary of the Commission for Inter Ritual Text Books
- Federation of Asian Bishops' Conferences: Member of the Commission of Theology
- Kerala Catholic Bishops' Council: Member of the Commission for Doctrine
- Syro-Malabar Catholic Church: Chair of the Catechesis Textbook Committee

== Episcopal ministry ==
=== Auxiliary bishop ===
On September 1, 2017, Pope Francis announced his election as the auxiliary bishop of Tellicherry by the Synod of Bishops for the Syro Malabar Church after the request of George Njaralakatt to have a Auxiliary Bishop. He was ordained and consecrated a bishop by Njaralakatt, Archbishop of Tellichery in the presence of George Valiamattam, Archbishop Emeritus of Tellicherry and Joseph Kallarangatt, Eparch of Palai at the St. Joseph’s Cathedral, Thalassery.

When He began his tenure as auxiliary bishop, He became the media commission chairman for the Kerala Catholic Bishops' Council and the Syro-Malabar Catholic Church. He also serves as the chairman of the Synodal Commission of the Good Shepherd Major Seminary, Kunnoth which supervises the seminary. He also spoke at the 2021 International Eucharistic Congress in Hungry to a large crowd.

=== Archbishop ===
In 2022, He was nominated by Cardinal George Alencherry to become the secretary of the Synod of Bishops replacing Antony Kariyil. In that Synodal Session, He was also elected to become the archbishop of the Archdiocese of Tellicherry replacing George Njaralakatt. He was installed by Major Archbishop George Alencherry on April 20, 2022, at St. Joseph's Cathedral in Thalassery.
