= Archeparchy of Tellicherry =

Eastern Catholic archeparchy in India

Archeparchy of Tellicherry ܐܪܟܝܕܝܘܩܝܐ ܕܬܲܠܲܣܲܪܝ

Location
- Country: India

Statistics
- Area: 4,958 km^{2} (1,914 sq mi)
- Population: Total; Catholics: (as of 2020); 3,814,247; 274,460 (7.2%)
- Parishes: 254

Information
- Denomination: Catholic Church
- Sui iuris church: Syro-Malabar Catholic Church
- Rite: East Syriac Rite
- Established: 31 December 1953; 72 years ago
- Cathedral: St Joseph's Cathedral in Palissery, Thalassery
- Patron saint: Saint Joseph
- Secular priests: 475 (304 diocesan, 171 religious)

Current leadership
- Pope: Leo XIV
- Major Archbishop: Raphael Thattil
- Archeparch: Joseph Pamplany
- Bishops emeritus: George Njaralakatt; George Valiamattam

Website
- archdioceseoftellicherry.org

The Archeparchy of Tellicherry (also anglicized as the Archdiocese of Thalassery) is a Syro-Malabar Church ecclesiastical jurisdiction or archeparchy of the Catholic Church in India. The boundaries of the Thalassery ecclesiastical province were extended to include Mangalore, Chickmangalore, Mysore, Shimoga and Ootty as there were settlers in the neighbouring States. The diocese covers an area of 18,000 km^{2} and a Catholic population of 273,826. Since 2022, Joseph Pamplany is the Metropolitan Archbishop.

The ecclesiastical province came into existence on 31 December 1953 through the papal bull Ad Christi Ecclesiam Regendam issued by Pope Pius XII. The boundaries of the new diocese were the same as those of the Latin Church Diocese of Calicut. Later, as Syro-Malabar Catholics migrated even to the states of Karnataka and Tamil Nadu, the boundaries were extended to the present Latin Diocese of Mangalore, Chickmangalur, Mysore, Shimoga, and Ootacamund by a decree of the Holy See on April 29. The Eparchies of Mananthavady, Thamarassery, Mandya, Bhadravathi, Belthangady are its Suffagran eparchies.

== Malabar Migration ==
The history of the Malabar Migration and that of the ecclesiastical province of Thalassery are closely connected. The Thalassery diocese took up the struggle of the settlers, who were mostly Syriac Rite Catholics not accustomed to Roman Rite ceremonies. Petitions were sent to the Holy See by the bishops of the settlers, who had migrated to the British Malabar since 1930, requesting for a diocese of their own. Cardinal Tisserant, the Prefect of the Oriental Congregation came to Malabar and personally saw the pitiable situation of the settlers. With the help of locals and priests, they started to make changes in the region.

== Ordinaries ==
Bishops and Archbishops

| Ordinary | Designation | Year of appointment | Last year of service |
|---|---|---|---|
| Sebastian Valloppilly | Bishop | 1956 | 1989 |
| George Valiamattam | Archbishop | 1989 | 2014 |
| George Njaralakatt | Archbishop | 2014 | 2022 |
| Joseph Pamplany | Archbishop | 2022 | present |

Auxiliary Bishops

| Ordinary | Designation | Year of appointment | Last year of service |
|---|---|---|---|
| Joseph Pamplany | Auxiliary Bishop | 2017 | 2022 |

== Suffagran eparchies ==
- Source: GCatholic

- Eparchy of Belthangady
- Eparchy of Bhadravathi
- Eparchy of Mandya
- Eparchy of Mananthavady
- Eparchy of Thamarassery

== Churches under Archdiocese of Thalassery ==
The Archdiocese of Thalassery is home to 203 parishes divided under 19 foranes (proto-presbyteries). The Archdiocese contains several historic and spiritually significant churches, many of which are known as the "first migration churches of Malabar." These parishes served as the spiritual and social backbone for the early Syro-Malabar migrants who settled in the northern high ranges of Kerala during the mid-20th century.

== See also ==
- Sacred Heart Schools, Angadikadavu – Eastern Catholic archeparchy in India
