= Jose =

- Gender: Male

Other names
- Related names: Joseph, Josef, Yoseph, Yosef, Yase, Yose, Jouse, Yúsuf, Yousef, Josie

Jose is the English transliteration of the Hebrew and Aramaic name Yose, which is etymologically linked to Yosef or Joseph.

== Given name ==
=== Mishnaic and Talmudic periods ===
- Jose ben Abin
- Jose ben Akabya
- Jose the Galilean
- Jose ben Halafta
- Jose ben Jochanan
- Jose ben Joezer of Zeredah
- Jose ben Saul

=== Male ===
- Jose (actor), Indian actor
- Jose Balagtas, Filipino film director
- Jose Baxter (born 1992), English footballer
- Jose Davis (born 1978), American football player
- Jose Glover (died 1638), English minister and pioneer of the printing press in the New World
- Jose Kaimlett (1941–2018), Indian presbyter and missionary
- Jose Kattukkaran (born 1950), Indian politician
- Jose Kurushinkal, Indian cricket umpire
- Jose Kusugak (1950–2011), Inuk politician
- Jose Lambert (born 1941), Belgian professor
- Jose K. Mani (born 1965), Indian politician
- Jose Mugrabi (born 1939), Israeli businessman
- Jose Nandhikkara (born 1964), Indian author
- Jose Pellissery (1950–2004), Indian film actor
- Jose Chacko Periappuram (born 1958), Indian surgeon
- Jose Porunnedom (born 1956), Syro-Malabar Catholic bishop
- Jose Prakash (1925–2012), Indian actor
- Jose Ramirez (American football) (born 1998), American football player
- Jose Slaughter (born 1960), American basketball player
- Jose Thettayil (born 1950), Indian politician
- Jose Thomas (born 1963), Indian film director
- Jose Waldberg, German spy
- Jose White (born 1973), American football player
- Jose Yu (born 1938), Hong Kong businessman

=== Female ===
- Jose Petrick (born 1924), Australian historian

== Surname ==
- Jaclyn Jose (1963–2024), Filipino actress

== See also ==
- Hurricane Jose, the name of two Atlantic storms:
  - Hurricane Jose (1999)
  - Hurricane Jose (2017)
