= Dharmaram =

Dharmaram may refer to:

- Pontifical Athenaeum Dharmaram Vidya Kshetram, an ecclesiastical university
- Dharmaram College, seminary in Bangalore, commonly known only as 'Dharamaran'
- Dharmaram, Peddapalli district in Peddapalli district, Andhra Pradesh
- Pragathi Dharmaram also earlier called as D. Dharmaram is a village in Ramayampet mandal of Medak District of Telangana
