= Kurian Kachappilly =

Catholic priest of the Carmelites of Mary Immaculate

Kurian Kachappilly (alias Kurian Kachappilly Joseph)
- Born: 6 July 1955 (age 71)
- Occupations: Professor of Philosophy, Religion and Business Ethics
- Website: www.kurian-kachappilly.com

Kurian Kachappilly (Kurian Kachappilly Joseph), born 6 July 1955, at Mallussery, in Kerala, India, is a Catholic priest of the Carmelites of Mary Immaculate (CMI) order, and a Professor of Philosophy, Religion and Business Ethics.

== Biography ==
Kachappilly was ordained a priest on 6 May 1986. Kachappilly was the President of the Pontifical Athenaeum, Dharmaram Vidya Kshetram, DVK (1918-2022). At present, he is the Coordinator of International Relations, DVK, Bangalore, India. He holds a Master's degree in English Literature (M.Lit), Master's in Psychology (MA), Licentiate in Philosophy (L.Ph), and PhD in Philosophy (K.U. Leuven, Belgium).

=== Later career ===
Kachappilly is a professor of philosophy, religion and business ethics at Dharmaram Vidya Kshetram (DVK) and Christ University, both in Bangalore, India. He has served as a visiting faculty in several institutions of higher learning both in India and abroad: Bangalore University, Bangalore; NIAS, Bangalore; K.U. Leuven, Belgium; UST, Manila, the Philippines; La Trobe, Melbourne, Australia; FHWS, Wuerzburg, Germany, etc.

He is the author of several books, including Mysticism without Bounds and Mystic Musing in World Religions. His most popular books include "God of Love" and "Between Partners". Kachappilly studied philosophy at Dharmaram Vidya Kshetram. During 1992-1996, he earned a Licentiate and PhD in philosophy from the Katholieke Universiteit Leuven, University of Leuven, Belgium. He is a well-known organizer of international conferences, like 7th International Whitehead Conference, Christ University, Bangalore;

== Major contributions ==
Kachappilly was the chief organizer of the International Process Philosophy Congress in Bangalore (2009). About 700 philosophers and intellectuals from Australia, Asia, Africa, Europe and United States attended this seventh international conference, jointly organised by Dharmaram College, Bangalore, Christ University, Bangalore and International Process Network (IPN).

The second major conference was on "Mysticism without Bounds" (2011), and the Chief Guest was the Dalai Lama; and "Bounds of Ethics in a Globalized World" (2014), in which delegates and representatives from seventy plus countries took part. The latest International Conference was on "Harmony: Interface of Cosmic, Ethical and Religious Orders" (2019), jointly organized by Christ University and DVK, Bangalore, India.

He is a TEDx Speaker, and a motivational speaker and resource person for General and Provincial Chapters and Assemblies.

Dr. Kurian Kachappilly Joseph has served the University in various capacities, like Dean of the Faculty of Philosophy, DVK and Christ University; Associate Director, Research Centre, Christ University; Director, Licentiate in Philosophy, Coordinator, Licentiate Programmes of DVK; President, Dharmaram Vidya Kshetram, Bangalore; Founding Editor, Tattva Journal of Philosophy, Christ University, etc. At present, Dr. Kurian Kachappilly Joseph is the Coordinator of International Relations, DVK, Bangalore, India

Countries Visited:

Visited over eighty-six (86) countries in SIX of the seven continents: Asia, Africa, Europe, North America, South America and Oceania. I could visit some of the countries when I was a student at K.U. Leuven, Belgium, and some others as a Visiting Faculty. Some countries I visited on an invitation to international conferences or symposiums and paper presentations. I also visited some countries as part of a pilgrimage (like the Vatican City, the Holy Land, etc.). I have not reached the continent of Antarctica. The number of countries visited became 91, the latest being Bosnia-Herzgovina.

=== Books ===
Some of his important works are as follows:

- Kachappilly, Kurian, Mysticism without Bounds, New Delhi: Christian World Imprints, 2015.
- Kachappilly, Kurian, Mystic Musings in World Religions, New Delhi: Christian World Imprints, 2013.
- Kachappilly, Kurian, Mystic Musings in Art and Poetry, New Delhi: Christian World Imprints, 2013.
- Kachappilly, Kurian, ed. Process, Religion and Society (Dharmaram Process Series), Bangalore: Dharmaram Publications.
- Kachappilly, Kurian, Process: Implications and Applications, Bangalore: Dharmaram Publications, 2006.
- Kachappilly, Kurian, God-Talk Reconstructed: An Introduction to Philosophy of God, Bangalore: Dharmaram Publications, 2006.
- Kachappilly, Kurian, ed. God-Talk: Contemporary Trends and Trials, Bangalore: Dharmaram Publications, 2006.
- Kachappilly, Kurian, God of Love: A Neoclassical Inquiry, Bangalore: Dharmaram Publications, 2002. (Revised Edition).
- Kachappilly, Kurian, Word of God Retold, Bangalore: Dharmaram Publications, 2001.
- Kachappilly, Kurian, Between Partners, Bangalore: Asian Trading Corporation, 1999.
- Kachappilly, Kurian, God of Love Revisited, Bangalore: Dharmaram Publications, 1998.
- Kachappilly, Kurian, Fratelli Tutti: Perspectives, Delhi: Christian World Imprint, 2021.
- Kachappilly, Kurian, ed. Ad Aeternam Memoriam: A Festschrift in Honour of Prof. Dr. Paul Kalluveettil, Delhi: Christian World Imprint, 2022.
- Kachappilly, Kurian, ed. An Epitome of Knowledge and Wisdom (A Festschrift in Honour of Fr. Cyriac Kanichai), Bangalore: Dharmaram Publications, 2025.

Some of the Major Events 2025

01. Talk on “World Religions and Religious Experience” at Christ University, Bangalore, for the students from the Fakultät für Informatik & Wirtschaftsinformatik - FH Würzburg, Germany, on February 28, 2025.

02. Lecture on “Best Practices in Writing and Publishing Collaborative Research,” at De La Salle University, Dasmariñas, the Philippines, March 19, 2025.

03. Talk on “Family Values in St. Kuriakose E. Chavara’s Testament of a Loving Father,” at the Meeting of the Family Unions in Tampa, Florida, USA, on May 10, 2025.

04. Paper on “Fusion of Horizons’ an Antidote to Ethnocentrism in Interfaith Dialogue,” at the 8th Symposium organised by the Hickey Centre for Interfaith Studies and Dialogue, Nazareth University, Rochester, New York, USA, May 28, 2025.

05. Paper on “Spirituality of Corporate Social Responsibility in Kautilya’s Arthashastra,” in the 18th International Forum on Ecological Civilisation on “Is it Too Late: Toward an Ecological Civilisation,” Pomona College, Claremont, California, USA, June 6, 2025.

06. Inaugural & Position Paper at the International Conference on “Literary Research: Emerging Paradigms and Perspectives,” Deva Matha College, Kuravilangad, Kerala, India, June 26, 2025.

07. Talk on “St. Chavara Legacy: Yesterday, Today and Tomorrow,” at Koinonia 2025, Carmel Public School, Vazhakulam, Kerala, India, July 5, 2025.

08. Talk on “Good Samaritans in the Digital World,” at the Provincial Plenary Assembly, Bhopal, MP, India, July 29, 2025.

09. Paper on “Pilgrims of Hope: Call to be a Beacon of Hope in the Jubilee Year,” at the MP CRI Meet with Bishops at the Pastoral Centre, Bhopal, MP, August 12, 2025.

10. Talk on “Leadership: Golden Rules of Authentic Leadership,” at the Seminar for Religious Superiors, at NBCLC, Bangalore, Karnataka, India, August 17, 2025.

11. Presentation on “Am I the Custodian? An Inquiry into Gandhi’s Theory of ‘Stewardship’,” at the International Conference on “Philosophical Foundations, Cultural Dimensions, and Societal Values of Ecological Civilisation and Sustainable Development,” at the Bulgarian Academy of Sciences, Sofia, Bulgaria, 07 – 10 October 2025.
