= Jonas Thaliath =

Indian Syro-Malabar Catholic bishop and educational visionary in Bengaluru

Mar Jonas Thaliath CMI
- Bishop of the Eparchy of Rajkot
- Church: Syro-Malabar Catholic Church
- Diocese: Eparchy of Rajkot
- Appointed: 1977
- In office: 11 May 1977 – 7 November 1981
- Previous posts: Rector, Dharmaram Vidya Kshetram (Bengaluru) (1960s)

Orders
- Consecration: 11 May 1977

Personal details
- Born: 21 December 1919 Puthenpally, Kerala, India
- Died: 7 November 1981 Rajkot, Gujurat, India

Mar Jonas Thaliath, CMI (also spelled Thalliath; 21 December 1919 – 7 November 1981) was an Indian prelate of the Syro-Malabar Catholic Church who served as the first Bishop of the Eparchy of Rajkot from 1977 until his death in 1981. He is also noted as a scholar on the Saint Thomas Christians for his monograph The Synod of Diamper (1958), which drew reviews in leading journals and continues to be cited in subsequent historiography.

== Early life and priesthood ==
Thaliath was born at Puthenpally, Kerala, on 21 December 1919; he entered the Carmelites of Mary Immaculate (CMI), made his religious profession in 1937, and pursued ecclesiastical studies in Kandy and Pune. After ordination, he taught at Dharmaram Vidya Kshetram in Bengaluru and rose to leadership positions within the CMI congregation.

== Career ==
=== Dharmaram College and Dharmaram Vidya Kshetram (DVK) ===
Institutional histories credit Thaliath as the visionary behind the development of Dharmaram College, noting he took charge of the study house on 21 November 1955 and drove the rapid development of its infrastructure and academic vision. Dharmaram’s later evolution into Dharmaram Vidya Kshetram (DVK), with its theology faculty recognised as a pontifical athenaeum, is presented as the fulfilment of a long-held plan to anchor Catholic higher education in Bengaluru.

=== Christ University ===
The founding vision of Christ College (established in 1969 and now recognised as Christ University) is attributed to Bishop Jonas Thaliath. Institutional accounts describe the college as the fulfilment of a “long cherished dream” realised through his “untiring efforts”, highlighting his role in registering the college trust and in securing government approval during the 1960s.

=== St John’s Medical College (Bengaluru) ===
According to congregational and ecclesial histories, Thaliath played a decisive role in the development of St. John's National Academy of Health Sciences, particularly in securing its financial autonomy and guiding it through a period of crisis in the 1970s. These accounts describe him as a “great visionary and practical genius”.

== Bishop of Rajkot ==
Thaliath was appointed the first Bishop of the newly erected Syro-Malabar Diocese of Rajkot and was consecrated on 11 May 1977; he served until his death on 7 November 1981.

== Publications ==
Thaliath authored a monograph on the early modern history of the Saint Thomas Christians:

- The Synod of Diamper (Rome: Pontificium Institutum Orientalium Studiorum, 1958), Orientalia Christiana Analecta 152, xix + 238 pp.

A congregational biography has also been published:

- Bishop Jonas Thaliath of Rajkot: A Biography (Rajkot: Deepti Publications, 1998).
