= Abraham V. M =

Indian academic

Hon'ble Vice Chancellor Fr. Abraham V. M. C.M.I
- Occupation: Vice-Chancellor
- Years active: 2019–2023

Academic background
- Education: Dharmaram Vidya Kshetram; University of Calicut; Iona College (New York); Bangalore University

Abraham V. M is C.M.I. priest and academic he served as the vice-chancellor of Christ University from 2019 to 2023. He was the former Pro-Vice-Chancellor of Christ University for the past 10 years.

== Controversy Over Tenure Duration ==
In February 2023, a controversy arose surrounding the tenure of Fr Abraham V. M, the Vice-Chancellor of Christ (Deemed to be University) in Bengaluru. The Carmelites of Mary Immaculate (CMI), the management of the institution, was alleged to be curtailing the five-year term prescribed by the University Grants Commission (UGC) for Vice-Chancellors. Fr Abraham V. M, who began his term on March 1, 2019, was initially appointed for three years. He received a one-year extension in 2022, concluding his term on February 28, 2023.

=== Internal Communications and Allegations ===
Fr Abraham V. M communicated his concerns to the university's chancellor, Fr Paul Achandy, pointing out alleged inconsistencies in the appointment of a new Vice-Chancellor. He emphasized that the appointment process might be in violation of UGC regulations. The Vice-Chancellor's concerns were primarily centered on the UGC's requirement for Vice-Chancellors to serve five-year terms. Additionally, in a letter dated February 27, he highlighted that a UGC member on the selection committee insisted on a public advertisement for the Vice-Chancellor position, a view that was not shared by the other committee members.

=== Response from CMI ===
The CMI, in its internal communications, maintained that the requirement for issuing a notification inviting applications for the Vice-Chancellor position was not applicable to Christ (deemed university) due to its 'minority status'. The prior general of CMI, Thomas C Mathew, did not comment on the decision to limit Fr Abraham's tenure to four years, despite previous Vice-Chancellors serving five-year terms.
