= Prem Mandir =

Prem Mandir may refer to:

- Prem Mandir, Rajkot, a Syro-Malabar Catholic cathedral in Gujarat, India
- Prem Mandir, Vrindavan, a religious and spiritual complex in Uttar Pradesh, India
