= Thomas Aykara =

Indian academic (born 1937)

- Born: 23 January 1937 (age 89)
- Occupation: Professor of philosophy
- Known for: Philosophy and Comparative Religion

Thomas Aykara CMI (born 23 January 1937) is the rector of Dharmaram College in Bengaluru, India. He is a Catholic priest of the Syro-Malabar Church. He joined the Carmelites of Mary Immaculate (CMI)Carmelites of Mary Immaculate congregation, St. Joseph's Province Kottayam in 1954. He is a philosopher, theologian and religious. He is a scholar, teacher, author and thinker. Several academic centres in India and abroad originated through the efforts of Thomas Aykara.

== Birth and family ==
Thomas Aykara was born to Joseph and Elisabeth on 23 January 1937 in Mevada, Palai, Kottayam district in Kerala, India. His siblings are Philip, Kuruvila, Joseph, Sr. Alphrida Congregation of Mother of Carmel, Annakutty, Sr. Gailsw Congregation of Mother of Carmel, Mariyakutty, Sr. Josita Congregation of Mother of Carmel.

== Education ==
He completed his SSLC from St Antony High School, Mutholy. He joined the Carmelites of Mary Immaculate (CMI) congregation, St. Joseph's Province Kottayam in 1954. He studied Latin, Syriac and English languages. He received a Licentiate in Philosophy and a Licentiate Theology, from Jnana-Deepa Vidyapeeth, Pontifical Atheneum, in Pune, India. He was sent to the Université Catolique de Louvain, Belgium in 1966, where he pursued his PhD in Philosophy on Alfred Schutz, a German Philosopher, in 1970, under the guidance of Jean Ladriere. Afterwards, he was sent to the Oxford University in 1970, where he pursued a PhD in Theology on Cosmic Consciousness:A Study on Sri Aurobindo and Teilhard De Chardin under the guidance of John Macquarrie in 1975.

== Later career ==
Thomas Aykara made his first religious profession on 16 May 1957 and was ordained on 6 April 1964. He was the Prior General of the CMI congregation and Vice-Chancellor of Dharmaram Vidya Kshetram from 1978-1984. He was the Provincial of St. Joseph's Province Kottayam from 1984-1987. He also served DVK as its President from 1991-1997. During this period he made seven main endowments by making a trust, namely, Bishop Jonas Thaliath Endowment Lectures Fund, and Fund for Library, Fund for PG Students, Fr. Pried Lectures Fund, Fr. Roger Memorial Fund, and Biblical Studies Fund. He was appointed as the Managing Editor of Deepika, the earliest daily newspaper of Kerala. Later, he served as the Chairman and Director of Rashtra Deepika Company Ltd. during 1989-2001. He was appointed the Director of Centre for the Study of World Religions (CSWR), Bengaluru, India, in 1975-78. He became the National President of the Conference of Religious India (CRI) in 1978-83. In 1978-82, he was the State President of Kerala Conference of Major Superiors (KCMS) and also founder President of the Syro-Malabar Religious Conference (SMRC). He was the member of National Governing Body, Indian Newspaper Society since 1988-97. He was the member of International Federation of Catholic University since 1991-97. In 2011, he became the Rector of Dharmaram College.

== Teaching experience ==
He was a teacher at Dharmaram, Bengaluru, India (1965–67, 1975–78, 1990–97). He also taught in Darsana Institute of Philosophy, Wardha, India(1984–85,1990) . He taught various theological subjects at CRI Brothers’ Theology Institute, Bengaluru (1990). Earlier, he taught at the University of Oxford (1973–74) and the Pontifical University of Saint Thomas Aquinas, Rome (1998-2002).

== Academic initiatives and new institutes and centres' ==
1. Journal of Dharma, a Research Quarterly, Published by Dharma Research Association, Bengaluru, 1974.
2. Centre for the Study of world Religions (CSWR), Bengaluru, India, 1971.
3. Centre for Indian and Inter Religious Studies (CIIS), Rome, 1977.
4. Darsana Cultural Centre, Kottayam, Kerala, India, 1984.
5. Vinayasadana(One year Diploma Course informative Spirituality), at Dharmaram Vidya Kshetram, Bengaluru, India, 1992.
6. Sakshatkkara, Centre for the Spiritual Realization (CSR), Pariyaram, Kerala, 1979.
7. Darsana Institute of Philosophy, Wardha, M.S., India, 1982.
8. RashtraDeepika Company Ltd., Kottayam, 1989.
9. Dharma Endowment Lectures, Faculty of Philosophy, DVK, 1993.
10. Bishop Jonas Thaliath Memorial Lectures, Faculty of Theology, DVK, Bengaluru, 1994.
11. Regional Theologate, Bhopal, 1983.
12. Anudhavana, First Mission Novitiate at Mancherial (AP) 1982.
13. Purchase, Developing Starting of St. Kuriakose Elias ChavaraKuriakose Elias Chavara Shrine at KainakariKainakary, 1983.
14. Sevasadan, CMI Transit House at Malad East, Bombay, 1980.
15. Dharma Nivas, New CMI Center in New Jersey, USA, 1981
16. Purchase New Flat in Rome, 1981.
17. CMI Centre in Bonn, Friesdorf, Germany, 1981.
18. Collaborated in the purchase of the Second Flat in Rome, 1998.

== Publications ==
=== Books ===
- Meeting of Religions, (ed.) Dharmaram publications, Centre for Indian and Inter-Religious Studies, Rome, 1978.
- Living Flame: Church of St. Thomas in India. St. Joseph's Press, Mannanam, 1986. It is a book about the Church of St. Thomas in India and deals with history, problems, hope, liturgy, etc., of the St. Thomas Christians.
- Phenomenology of the Social World.
- Cosmic Consciousness: A Comparative Study on Teilhard de Chardin and Sri Aurobindo, 1992. It is a comparative cosmic consciousness study of Sri Aurobindo and Teilhard. They are the two eminent exponents of the east and west respectively.
- Mission of the Church in India Today: Challenges and Changes.
- Missiology for the Third Millennium, 1994. It is a collection of twenty four articles about Bishop Januarius, the first bishop of Chanda Diocese, edited by Thomas Aykara.

=== Article ===
- Theologizing Versus Living Unique and Universal, edited by Dr. Chethimattam, Dharmaram Publications, Bangalore, 1972.
- Phenomenology Yesterday and Today in Darsanam, ed. by Dr. Nambiaparambil, Janatha Books, Thevara, 1970.
- Prophetic Role of Religious Life Today in Samarpitha, 1981.
- Inculturation and Formation Dominican Asram, Dec. 1993.
