= Jose Nandhikkara =

Indian professor (born 1964)

- Born: 16 February 1964 (age 62)
- Occupation: Professor of philosophy

Jose Nandhikkara CMI (born 16 February 1964) is a professor of philosophy at Dharmaram Vidya Kshetram and Christ University, both in Bangalore, India. He is the author of several books, including Environmental Interface: Literature, Law, Science, Philosophy and Ethical Interface: Literature, Economics, Politics, Religion.

== Birth and education ==
Jose Nandhikkara was born on 16 February 1964. He joined the Carmelites of Mary Immaculate (C.M.I.) of the Devamatha province in Thrissur. He earned a Bachelor of Philosophy (1986) and a Bachelor of Theology in 1993, both from Dharmaram Vidya Kshetram in Bengaluru.

== Career and post-graduate study ==
On 1 January 1994, he was ordained a priest in the Syro-Malabar Church. He then pursued a Licentiate in Systematic Philosophy at Gregorian University, Rome, Italy and graduated in 1997. His Licentiate thesis was titled "Natural Religion according to J. H. Newman". In 1999, he completed an MA in philosophy and theology at Oxford University, UK. with thesis title was "Religion according to Ludwig Wittgenstein". He earned a PhD in Philosophy at Warwick University, UK, in 2004; his dissertation was titled "Being Human from a Religious Point of View after Wittgenstein."

Nandhikkara is a Fellow at the International Dialogue Centre – KAICIID and is chief editor of the Journal of Dharma.

== Publications ==
- Being Human after Wittgenstein: A Philosophical Anthropology (2011)
- Ethical Interface: Literature, Economics, Politics, Religion (2014)
- Environmental Interface: Literature, Law, Science, Philosophy (2015)
- Religious Interface: Secular, Sacred, Rationality (2016)
- Nurturing Dialogue: Perspectives and Projects (2017)
- Feminine Genius: Perspectives and Projects (2017)
- Exploring Identity and Alterity: Perspectives and Projects (2020).
