= Virginia Rajakumari =

Indian Christian theologian

The Reverend Sister Virginia Rajakumari, SAB Congregation of Sisters of St. Anne, Bangalore (SAB)
- Born: Virginia Rajakumari Sandiyagu; October 8, 1965 (age 61)
- Other name: V. R. Sandiyagu
- Occupation: Spiritual Formator
- Years active: 21st century
- Known for: Scholarship in Biblical Studies
- Title: The Reverend Sister
- Board member of: Society for Biblical Studies in India (President); Bible Commission, Archdiocese of Bangalore (Secretary); Sisters of St. Anne, Bangalore (General Councilor); St. Anne’s Educational Society, Bangalore (Governing Councilor)
- Relatives: Rev. Fr. Ignatius Anthappa

Academic background
- Education: B.Th. (DVK) (1995); M.Th. (SPPI) (1997); M.A. (KU Leuven) (2004); Ph.D. (KU Leuven) (2008); Dharmaram Vidya Kshetram (DVK), Bangalore; St. Peter's Pontifical Institute (SPPI), Bangalore; Maria-Theresia College, KU Leuven (Belgium)
- Thesis: Women as Eyewitnesses to the Christian Kerygma: The Galilean Women in the Redaction of Luke: An Exegetical Study of Luke 8:1-3 (2008)
- Doctoral advisor: Reimund Bieringer
- Other advisors: Lucien Legrand, MEP, P. A. Sampath Kumar
- Influences: Feminism

Academic work
- Era: 21st century
- Discipline: Biblical Studies
- Sub-discipline: New Testament
- School or tradition: Theology
- Institutions: Bangalore; SDB-Kristu Jyoti College, Krishnarajapuram; St. Peter's Pontifical Seminary, Malleswaram; National Biblical, Catechetical & Liturgical Centre, Banaswadi; Dharmaram Vidya Kshetram, Bannerghatta Road; Indian Institute of Spirituality, Rajajinagara; Mysore; Dhyanavana - International Institute of Spirituality, R. S. Naidu Nagar
- Main interests: Women's participation in the Church
- Notable ideas: Women in Christianity
- Influenced: Biblical hermeneutics

Virginia Rajakumari Sandiyagu (born 8 October 1965) is a Biblical scholar belonging to Congregation of Sisters of St. Anne, Bangalore (SAB). She teaches Sacred Scriptures at Kristu Jyoti College, Krishnarajapuram, Bangalore. Rajakumari is known for Biblical hermeneutics, especially her research on re-reading scriptures that hitherto relegated women to the background. Her re-interpretation has shed new light on importance of women in Old Testament and New Testament.

== Early life and education ==
Sandiyagu, V. R. professed as a Nun on 21 May 1985 with Sisters of St. Anne of Bangalore (SAB). She studied in Dharmaram Vidya Kshetram, Bangalore, graduating in 1995 with a B.Th. degree. She continued her studies in St. Peter's Pontifical Seminary, enrolling in a postgraduate course leading to M.Th. The faculty included Lucien Legrand, MEP and P. A. Sampath Kumar. Sandiyagu graduated in 1997.

In the 2000s, Sandiyagu enrolled with KU Leuven in Leuven, Belgium, where she was guided by Reimund Bieringer. In 2004, she graduated with a M.A. degree and continued her studies at KU Leuven, enrolling in a doctoral programme. She studied in Maria-Theresia College. During her time at KU Leuven, Sandiyagu also took part in an International research project Mary Magdalene and the Touching of Jesus. An Intra- and Interdisciplinary Investigation of the Interpretation of John 20,17 in Exegesis, Iconography and Pastoral Care. In 2008, Sandiyagu graduated with a Ph.D. degree. Her dissertation was listed in fr:Revue théologique de Louvain.

== Career ==
Sandiyagu teaches Sacred Scriptures at Salesians of Don Bosco-run Kristu Jyoti College, Krishnarajapuram as a permanent faculty. She also teaches as a guest faculty at St. Peter's Pontifical Seminary, Malleswaram, National Biblical, Catechetical & Liturgical Centre, Banaswadi and Dharmaram Vidya Kshetram, Bannerghatta Road

As a scholar in Biblical Studies, Sandiyagu is engaged in scripture engagement as Secretary of Bible Commission, Karnataka Regional Catholic Bishops' Council In November 2024, she got elected as President of Society for Biblical Studies in India for biennium 2024-2026, succeeding Old Testament Scholar, K. Jesurathnam, STBC.

She is on the Council of Congregation of Sisters of St. Anne, Bangalore as General Councilor. Sandiyagu is also Governing Councilor of St. Anne’s Educational Society, Bangalore that manages St. Anne's First Grade College for Women in Bangalore.

== Notable works ==
- Sandiyagu, V.R. (2004). Galilean Women in the Company of Jesus: A Text-Critical and Syntactical Analysis of Luke 8:1-3 (M.A. thesis). KU Leuven.
- ——— (2005). "Review: Filiop Noël, The Travel Narrative in the Gospel of Luke, Interpretation of Lk 9,51-19,28 (Collectanea Biblica et Religiosa Antiqua, 5)". Bijdragen: Tijdschrift voor Filosofie en Theologie. 66 (3): 343–352.
- ——— (January 2006). "ἕτερος and ἄλλος in Luke". Novum Testamentum. 48 (2): 105–130. doi:10.1163/156853606777065350.
- ——— (2007). "Misreading Mary Magdalene: a critical review of Bruce Chilton's recent book on Mary Magdalene". Bijdragen, International Journal in Philosophy and Theology. 68 (1): 87–104. doi:10.2143/BIJ.68.1.2019445.
- ——— (2008). Women as Eyewitnesses to the Christian Kerygma: The Galilean Women in the Redaction of Luke: An Exegetical Study of Luke 8:1-3 (Ph.D. thesis). K.U.Leuven. Faculteit Godgeleerdheid.
- ——— (2008). "Joanna in Biblical Scholarship: Fact or Fiction?". Vidyajyoti Journal of Theological Reflection. 72: 340–355.
- ——— (March 2009). "Women's Prayer in the Bible: A Contextual Understanding in Reference to the Psalms". Kristu Jyoti. 25 (1): 25–42.
- ——— (September 2009). "The crucial role of Women in fostering inter-religious and inter-cultural dialogue in the Asian context". Ethics and Society. 1 (1): 152–165.
- ——— (2019). "Discipleship in Luke: Struggles in Interpretation and Living". Malabar Theological Review. 14 (1/2): 110–132.
- ——— (December 2020). "Daughters of Zelophehad: Story of Inheritance and Influence". Asian Horizons. 14 (4): 988–1004.

Professional and academic associations
Preceded by K. Jesurathnam, STBC	President, Society for Biblical Studies in India; 2024-2026	Succeeded by Incumbent
