= Roger Burggraeve =

- Born: 1942 (age 83–84); Passendale, Belgium

Academic background
- Education: Katholieke Universiteit Leuven
- Doctoral advisor: Louis Janssens

Academic work
- Era: Contemporary philosophy and theology
- School or tradition: Catholic moral theology; Levinasian ethics
- Institutions: Katholieke Universiteit Leuven. Centre international Lumen Vitae (Bruxelles), Dharmaram Vidya Kshetram (Bangalore)
- Main interests: Moral theology, biblical philosophy, Jewish dialogical philosophy, Emmanuel Levinas
- Notable works: From Self-Development to Solidarity (1985); An Ethics of Mercy (2016); Wombness (2025)

Roger Burggraeve (born 1942, Passendale, Flanders, Belgium) is a Belgian Salesian priest, moral theologian, philosopher, and Emeritus Professor at the Katholieke Universiteit Leuven (KU Leuven). He is internationally recognised for his contributions to Catholic moral theology, biblical philosophy, and Jewish dialogical ethics, particularly in relation to the philosophy of Emmanuel Levinas.

== Early life and education ==
Burggraeve was born in Passendale in 1942 and entered the Salesian Society of St Francis de Sales (SDB). He earned a licentiate in philosophy in Rome and later a doctorate in moral theology at KU Leuven in 1980, influenced by his mentor Louis Janssens.

== Academic career ==
From 1980 to 1988, Burggraeve was Associate Professor in KU Leuven’s Faculty of Theology and Religious Studies. He became Professor (Ordinarius) in 1988 and served until 2007, before being appointed Emeritus Professor. He continued teaching until around 2010, lecturing in biblical ethics, Christian sexual and conjugal ethics, and pastoral guidance.

He also taught in the faculties of law, pharmacy, medicine, and philosophy. Internationally, he served as Visiting Professor at the Centre international Lumen Vitae (Bruxelles), Dharmaram Vidya Kshetram (Bangalore), and in institutions in Congo, Kenya, and Canada.

== Research and contributions ==
Burggraeve’s work engages with:

- The ethical and Jewish thought of Emmanuel Levinas
- Christian moral theology and biblical hermeneutics
- Marital, relational, and family ethics
- Guidance ethics in pastoral, therapeutic, and educational contexts
- Philosophical explorations of mercy, forgiveness, and responsibility

He co-founded the Centre for Peace Ethics at KU Leuven and serves as its Honorary Chair. He has also contributed to ethical committees in Flanders, including Caritas Catholica Flanders and the Flemish Welfare Union.

== Selected publications ==
Burggraeve has authored over 365 works, including books, articles, and essays in English, Dutch, French, Italian, and Japanese.

- From Self-Development to Solidarity: An Ethical Reading of Human Desire in Its Socio-Political Relevance According to Emmanuel Levinas (1985)
- Swords into Plowshares: Theological Reflections on Peace (1991)
- The Wisdom of Love in the Service of Love: Emmanuel Levinas on Justice, Peace and Human Rights (trans. Jeffrey Bloechl)
- Emmanuel Levinas: A Bibliography, Primary and Secondary
- An Ethics of Mercy: On the Way to Meaningful Living and Loving (Peeters, 2016)
- To Love Otherwise: Essays in Bible Philosophy and Ethics (Peeters, 2020)
- Wombness: A Reflective In-Depth Reading of the Good Samaritan Narrative (Dharmaram Publications, 2025; ISBN 978-93-92996-61-0)

== Awards, legacy and influence ==
Burggraeve received the Ritus & Tempelbouw Oeuvre Prize in the Netherlands for his philosophical and theological contributions, particularly his exploration of Levinasian themes such as freedom, responsibility, and the ethics of “the face”.

He is regarded as a pioneer in integrating Levinas’s ethics into Catholic moral theology. His development of an “ethics of growth” and focus on mercy have shaped contemporary debates in moral theology, peace ethics, and interreligious dialogue. His teaching and publications have influenced students, theologians, and scholars worldwide.
