= M. N. Reddi =

Commissioner of Police, Bangalore City
- In office 31 July 2014 – 31 July 2015
- Preceded by: Raghavendra H. Auradkar
- Succeeded by: N. S. Megharikh

Personal details
- Born: 23 January 1960 (age 66) Kurnool, Andhra Pradesh, India
- Education: MA Sociology; M.Phil. Sociology
- Alma mater: JNU, New Delhi; Christ University, Bangalore
- Occupation: Civil Servant

M. N. Reddi (born 23 January 1960) is a senior officer in the Indian Police Service and in July 2014 was appointed Commissioner of Police, Bangalore City. He has long experience in traffic policing, traffic management and road safety. He is Tech savvy police officer. He did his undergraduate studies at Christ College. He has an M.A. and an M.Phil in sociology from Jawaharlal Nehru University, New Delhi, and has graduated as an officer of the elite Indian Police Service from the National Police Academy.
