= Ankur Betageri =

Indian writer

- Born: 1983 (age 42–43); Bangalore, Karnataka, India
- Education: Christ College (M.Sc.); IIT Delhi (Ph.D.)
- Occupations: Poet, fiction writer, artist
- Writing career
- Language: English, Kannada, Hindi
- Notable works: Bhog and Other Stories; The Bliss and Madness of Being Human

Ankur Betageri (born 1983 in Bangalore, Karnataka) is an Indian poet, fiction writer, photographer and arts activist. He currently teaches English at Bharati College, University of Delhi. In 2012, he was named as one of the ten best writers in the country by the English daily Indian Express. He holds a master's in clinical psychology from Christ University, Bangalore. Betageri is also known for founding the public arts and activist platform, Hulchul, whose artistic interventions in reclaiming Public Spaces like public washrooms and roadside walls, and the use of art to transform the everyday urban life have been widely appreciated. As a poet he has represented India at The III International Delphic Games (2009) at Jeju, South Korea, and Lit Up Writers Festival (2010) at Singapore.

== Academic career ==
Betageri received his doctorate from IIT Delhi in 2020. His thesis titled ‘Thinking beyond the Finitude of Human Condition’ received Distinction in Doctoral Research Award for the year 2020.

== Poetry and fiction ==
Betageri's poetry collection The Bliss and Madness of Being Human (2013) has been reviewed. Gopikrishnan Kottoor was critical, calling Betageri "self-indulgent" and noting that he "is trying to get at his own voice, and considering that he is just 30, he still has enough time. Ankur must take heed of real poetry happening all over, even as he cocoons himself in the illusions of his own penning." Kottoor added: "His [Betageri's] weaknesses include his fly-over statements, limitations of theme, and his predominating subjectivity. The 'I' element in many of the poems makes them much too personal, often fencing him in within the orbit of personal statements and observations. He'll do well to off-load his subjectivity, and externalise his poetry."

Speaking to The Indian Express in 2012, U.R. Ananthamurthy said of him: "Betageri writes his poetry and short fiction in Kannada as well as English, influenced both by the local and the global. Much of our Indian English writing is highly westernized but his is different. He writes in two voices both very significant... He reminds me of the great A.K. Ramanujan who wrote in both tongues with perfect ease."

Basant Badal Deta Hai Muhavre (2011) is the Hindi translation of his selected English poems by the Hindi poet Rahul Rajesh. His poems have also been translated into Bengali and Korean.

Betageri's short fiction collection Bhog and Other Stories (2010) has been praised for introducing characters who "have been largely invisible in Indian fiction in English." In a review the Nigerian poet Tade Ipadeola writes, "Betageri’s greatest achievement in this collection may very well be his unveiling of the world within India as well as the India to be found in the rest of the world." While some stories depict "a world in which all values are suspect and all attempts to achieve identity are subject to frustration" others "take strange, allegorical forms" Reviewing the book the poet Anamika observes, "Defamiliarization of everyday reality by breaking it into micro-moments of non-happenings seems to be his patent technique especially in stories where he delicately handles post-modern techniques of deconstructing diary-entries (…Aftermath of a Broken Love Affair), confessions and mood-swings (Malavika), dialogues and reflections (A Conversation: Story Written in the Manner of a Movie Script)." Betageri's stories have been translated into Hindi and Italian.

Betageri is also a translator He has translated Indian writers like P. Lankesh into English, and the works of writers like Poe, Whitman, Pessoa, Sorescu, Rimbaud, Neruda and Pasolini into Kannada.

== Art and photography ==
Ankur Betageri has exhibited his photographs at various places including ICCR, Delhi (2012), St. Stephen's College (2012) and Delhi University (2011). His photographic work often juxtaposes text and image creating the experience of what he calls "existential pause" and "bare silence". Betageri's artistic practices involve interventions in advertising billboards and the use of stencils, reproductions of paintings and photographic images in unconventional places like public washrooms, public walls, parks and marketplaces.

Betageri is the founder of the public arts platform Hulchul, known for its novel public art practices like public art exhibits, washroom art projects, poetry reading in public places and creating social sculptures with trees in the city of Delhi. Hulchul's washroom art project has been recognized as a first and listed in the Limca Book of Records.

== Bibliography ==
Books

English

- Bhog and Other Stories (Pilli Books, 2010)
- The Bliss and Madness of Being Human (Poetrywala, 2013)

Kannada

- Hidida Usiru (Abhinava Prakashana, 2004)
- Idara Hesaru (Abhinava Prakashana, 2006)
- Haladi Pustaka (Kanva Prakashana, 2009)
- Malavika mattu Itara Kathegalu (Sahitya Bhandara, 2011)

Translation into other languages

- Basant Badal Deta Hai Muhavre (Hindi, Yash Prakashan, 2011)

Journal articles

- A Case for the Standardization of Indian English Indian Literature, Vol. 61, No. 1 (297).
- The Breaking of Shakuntala Indian Literature, Vol. 62, No. 5 (307).
- A Refutation of M.N. Srinivas's Theory of Sanskritization New English Review, 2018/7.
