= Saju Chackalackal =

Indian philosopher (born 1965)

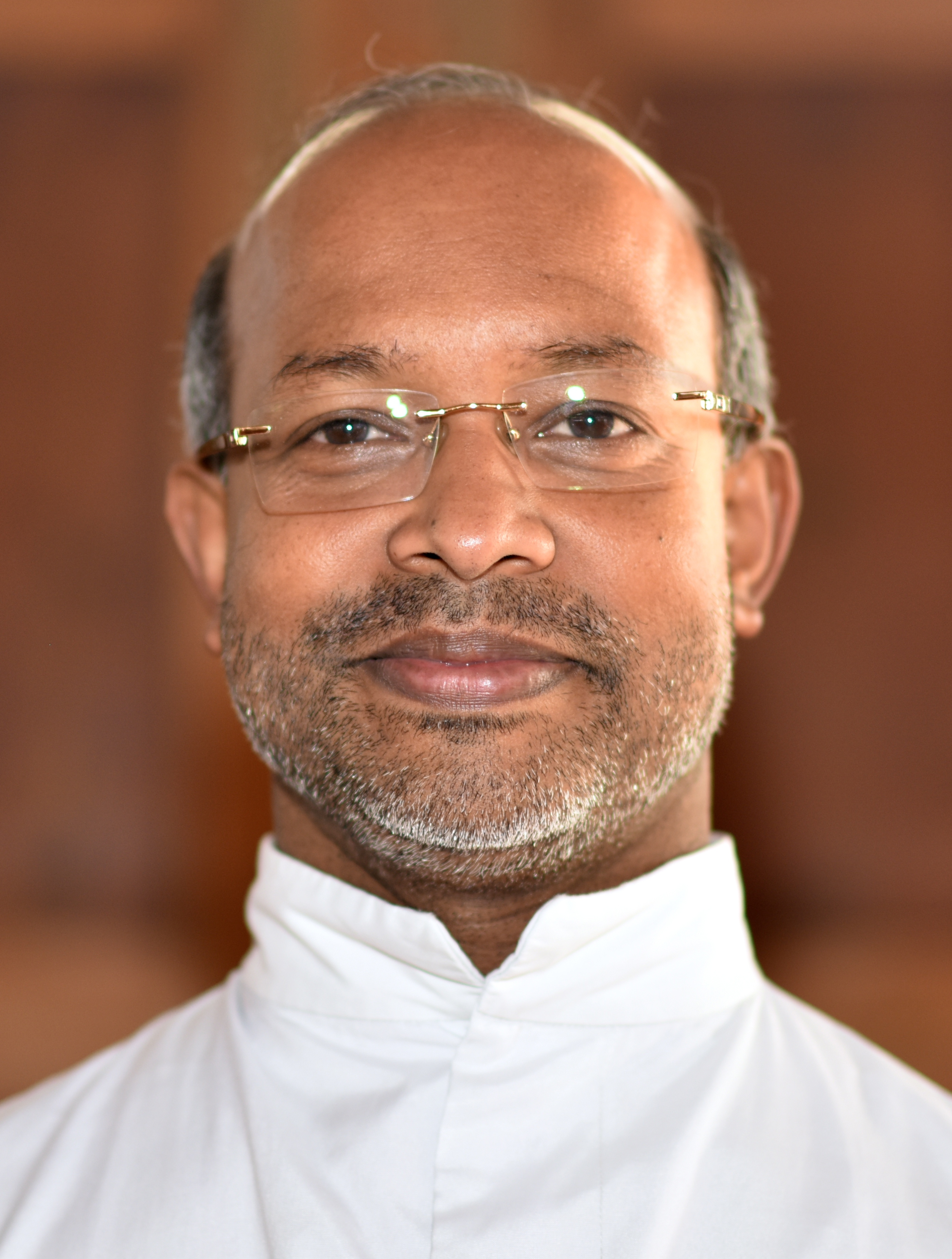
- Chackalackal in 2018
- Born: March 15, 1965 (age 61); Meladoor, Thrissur, India

Education
- Education: Dharmaram Vidya Kshetram; Pontifical University of Saint Thomas Aquinas

Philosophical work
- Era: Contemporary philosophy
- Region: Western philosophy Eastern philosophy
- Institutions: Dharmaram Vidya Kshetram
- Main interests: Kantianism; Epistemology

Saju Chackalackal (born 15 March 1965) is an Indian author and professor of Philosophy at Dharmaram Vidya Kshetram Bangalore. He is also a Catholic religious priest of the Carmelites of Mary Immaculate Congregation. He is a Kantian scholar who obtained a PhD from Pontifical University of Saint Thomas Aquinas Rome. He was the former chief editor of the Journal of Dharma. He has authored many books and articles. He was instrumental in preparing a number of course materials for Indira Gandhi National Open University, Delhi. He was elected as the Provincial of CMI Preshitha Province, Coimbatore. He continues the title for the second term too.

== Books published ==
- Unity of Knowing and Acting in Kant, Dharmaram Publications, Bangalore. ISBN 81-8686-151-3 ISBN 978-81-8686-151-6
- Ramayana and the Indian ideal: a search into the prevailing humanistic values in the Ramayana of Valmiki, Dharmaram Publications, Bangalore.
- Igniting Minds to Transform the Society: "legacy of K.E. Chavara for Innovative and Inclusive Education" and Other Essays on Education ISBN 81-8995-874-7 ISBN 978-81-8995-874-9
- Tradition and Innovation: Philosophy of Rootedness and Openness, Bangalore: Asian Trading Corporation, 2011. ISBN 978-81-7086-610-7

== Philosophical contributions ==
Chackalackal's philosophical contributions are generally in the areas of philosophy, ethics, Immanuel Kant, Religion and Society. In these fields he has published more than a dozen books and over a hundred articles. His most notable contribution is in the field of Kantianism through his book "Unity of Knowing and Acting in Kant: A Paradigmatic Integration of the Theoretical and the Practical." In this book he unearths the underlying unity between knowing and acting emerging at different periods and realms of Kant's philosophical thinking. Through his analytic and synthetic approach to the threefold critique, he highlights the dialectics of the noesis and the noetic, the phenomenon and the metaphysics of the noumenon and the good and the beautiful. His research shows how Kant himself as warranty to this claim of absoluteness to the moral imperative in the field of free will.

Chackalackal was also instrumental in setting up Hindu Ethics collection at Globethics.net during his tenure as its director in India. The Hindu ethics collection was an initiative to collect and organise content on ethical philosophy of Hinduism in a coherent framework. Under the aegis of globethics.net he organized three major workshops titled "Literature and Ethics," "Economics and Ethics," "Psychology and Ethics," and "Politics and Ethics."
