= Gregory Karotemprel =

Indian East Syric Catholic bishop (1933–2026)

His Excellency Mar Gregory Karotemprel CMI
- Bishop Emeritus of Rajkot
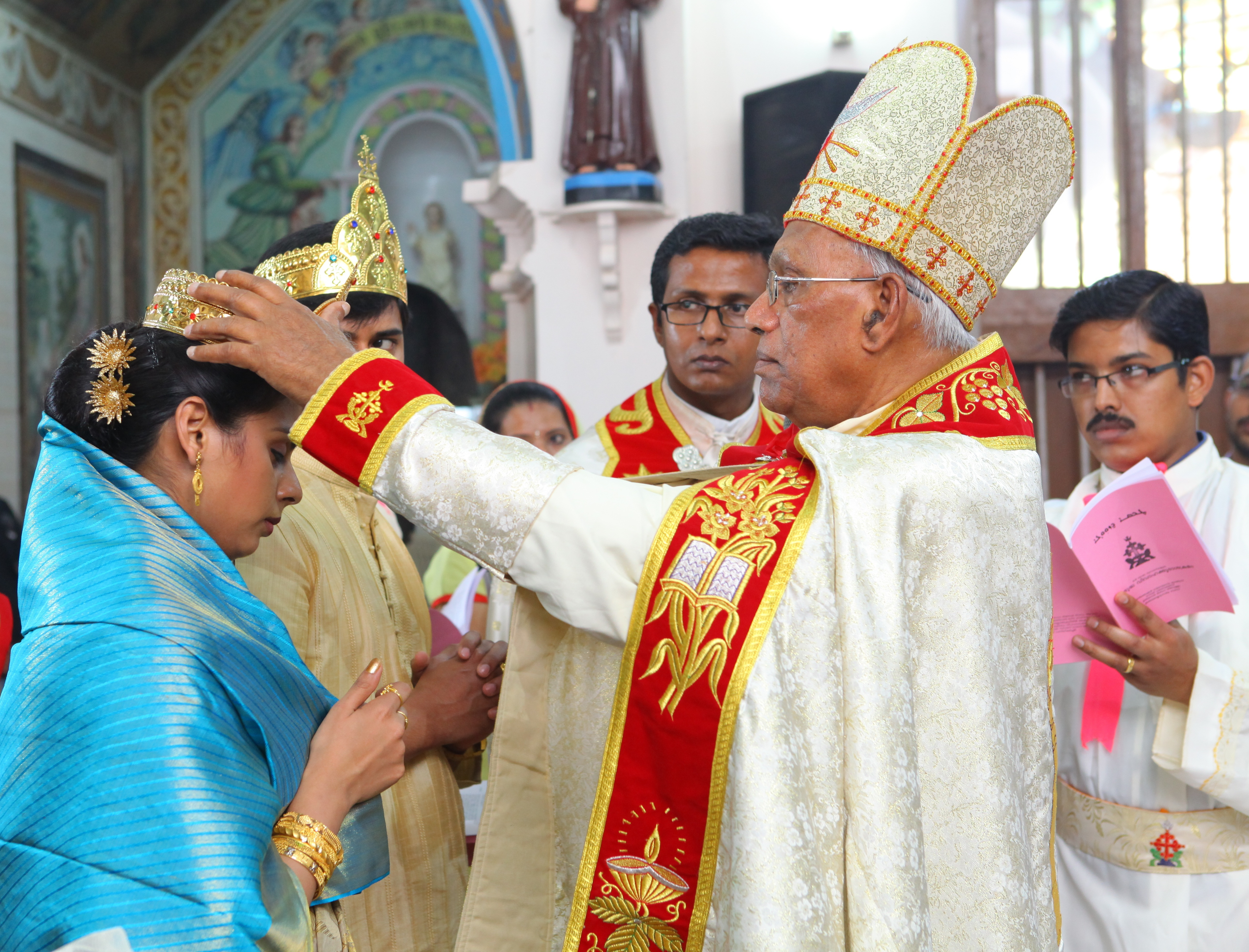
- Karotemprel performing the Crowning ceremony during a Syro-Malabar wedding
- Archdiocese: Kalyan
- Diocese: Rajkot
- Appointed: 22 January 1983
- Term ended: 16 July 2010
- Predecessor: Yonas Thaliath
- Successor: Jose Chittooparambil

Orders
- Ordination: 17 May 1963
- Consecration: 24 April 1983 by Antony Padiyara, Charles Gomes and Gratian Mundadan
- Rank: Bishop

Personal details
- Born: 6 May 1933 Chemmalamattom, Travancore, British Raj
- Died: 19 July 2026 (aged 93) Rajkot, Gujarat, India
- Denomination: Saint Thomas Christian
- Residence: Bishop's House, Rajkot

Mar Gregory Karotemprel (6 May 1933 – 19 July 2026) was an Indian Syro-Malabar Catholic hierarch and theologian, who served as bishop of the Eparchy of Rajkot from 1983 until his retirement in 2010.

== Biography ==
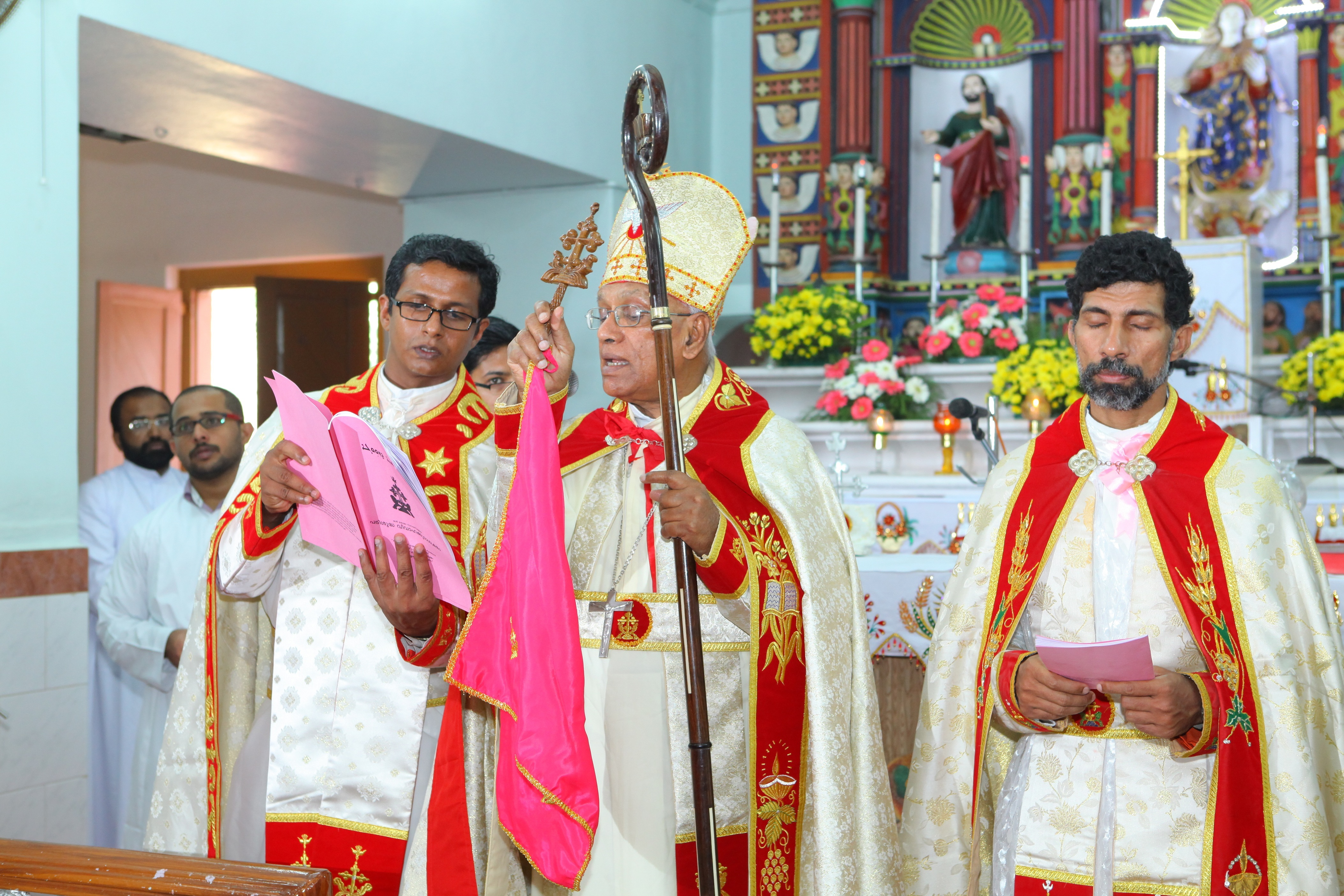
Mar Gregory Karotemprel with Fr. Palakkappilly (2014)

Mar Gregory Karotemprel was born at Chemmalamattam in Kottayam district on 6 May 1933. He joined the Carmelites of Mary Immaculate congregation and made his first profession on 8 December 1955 at Mannanam. He did his philosophical and theological studies at Dharmaram Vidya Kshethram, Bangalore. He was ordained priest on 17 May 1963. He was elected as the Provincial of the S.H. Province of the CMI congregation in 1978. While serving as the Provincial, he was appointed bishop of Rajkot. His consecration and installation as bishop took place on 24 April 1983. He is known for restoring crowning ceremony in the sacrament of matrimony in Syro-Malabar Church, which took place on 6 January 2014 at St. Mary’s Major Archiepiscopal Church, Arakuzha.

Karotemprel died in Rajkot, Gujarat, on 19 July 2026, at the age of 93.

== See also ==
- Syro-Malabar Eparchy of Palai

Catholic Church titles
Preceded by Yonas Thaliath	Bishop of Rajkot; 1983–2010	Succeeded by Jose Chittooparambil
