= Bhog and Other Stories =

- Author: Ankur Betageri
- Language: English
- Genre: Short Stories
- Publisher: Pilli Books
- Publication date: 2010
- Publication place: India
- ISBN: 978-81-920175-0-1

Bhog and Other Stories is a collection of fourteen short stories by Ankur Betageri, first published in 2010. Stories in the collection include "The Source of the Stream", "Big Bear Remembers Kako", "Bhog", and "Malavika". The stories are noted for their surreal quality, which "blurs the distinction between the real and the unreal to a frightening extent."
