= Vineeth Vincent =

Indian beatboxer

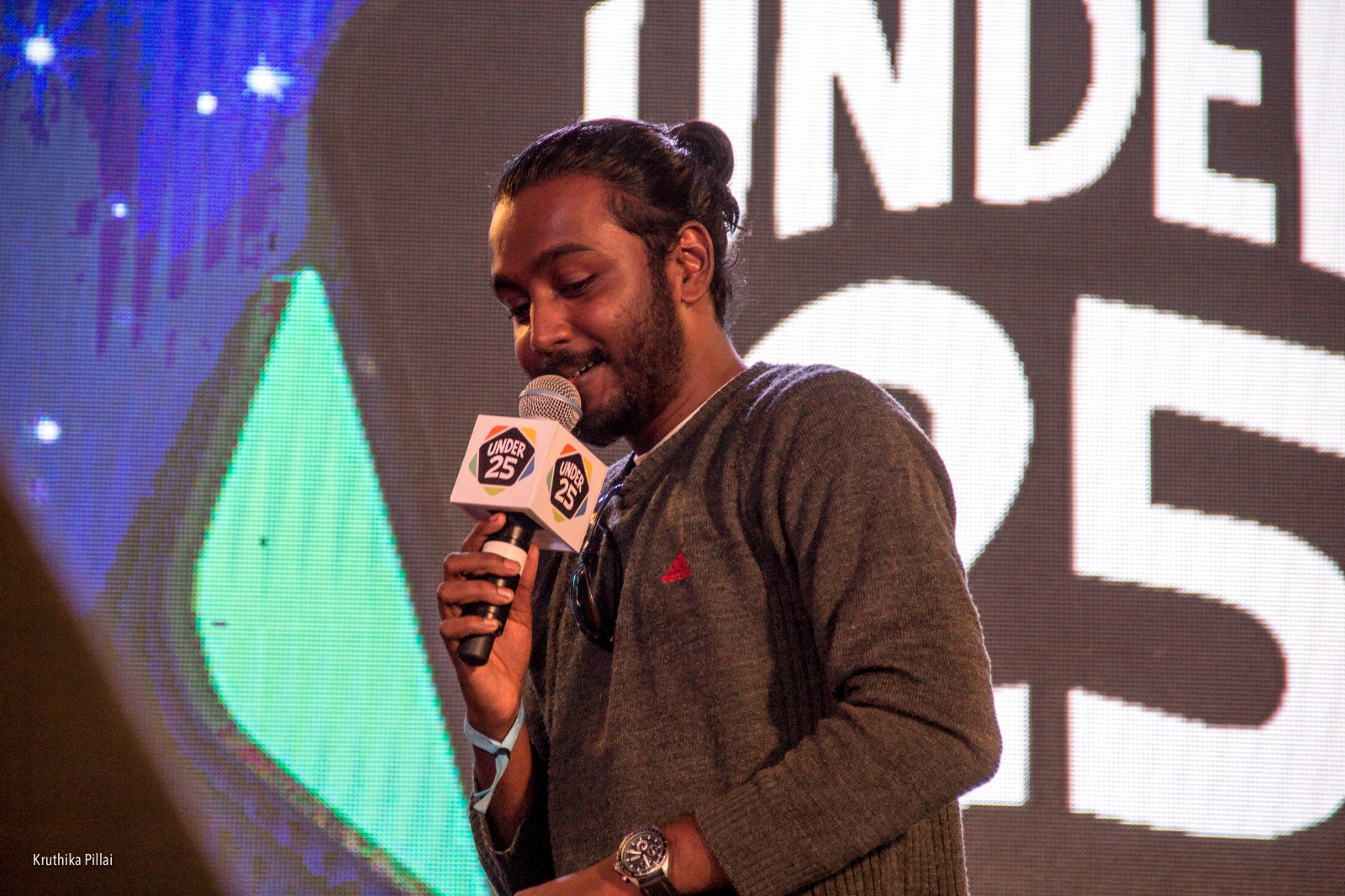
- Vineeth Vincent

Background information
- Born: 9 July 1989 (age 37)
- Genre: Beatbox
- Occupation: Beatbox artist
- Instrument: Human Voice
- Years active: 2008–present
- Label: Unsigned artist

Vineeth Vincent (born 9 July 1989) is a Beatboxer, Musician, emcee and performing artist from Bangalore, Karnataka, India. He is considered one of the biggest beatboxers in India.

== Career ==
Vineeth Vincent started off as a professional emcee in Bangalore during May 2007. In 2008, he took a year off from his studies at Christ University to pay more attention to music and beatboxing. He spent a month at Mrinalini Sarabhai's Darpana Academy of Performing Arts in Ahmedabad, where he mingled with artists and had the chance to experiment with beatboxing. He returned to Bangalore and has been working since 2008 as a professional beatboxer.

He performed with The Boxettes in 2010 and Austrian beatboxing group Bauchklang in 2009 among many other artists and bands. In the search for beatboxing talent by the British Council Library (BCL), He was selected as part of the final eight and performed with Voctronica. Vineeth Vincent was given the duty of Cultural Secretary to lead the cultural activities at Christ University during the academic year 2010–11 and during this period two world records were initiated.

By the end of 2017, Vineeth had over 1250 shows in his credit, held two titles, one for Guinness Book of World Records, and one for Limca book of world records, spoken four times at TEDx, and two times at Josh Talks, and hosted and performed at MI Talks, Delhi.

Vineeth's collaboration with other artistes resulted in SaxBox, which has a saxophonist and two beatboxers.

== Issues ==
Vineeth has been vocal against the exploitation of artists and has asked artists not to perform for free despite the pressure. In this regard, he has experimented with alternate business models in the music and culture industry. His first endeavour was 'Beat route beta run' wherein he and three others travelled across the country while doing performances. In July 2015, he set out on a 5000 km solo bike ride across India, including Delhi, Pune, Mumbai, Kochi and Goa, and performed at multiple preset and random locations enroute.

== World record ==
On 10 January 2011, Christ Junior College, Bangalore, under ensemble director Vineeth Vincent, in an event titled 'Can You Say Beat Box?' created the largest human beatbox ensemble in the Limca Book of Records with 2136 participants.

According to the Guinness World Records, the previous record for the largest human beatbox ensemble involved 1,246 participants and was achieved by Vineeth Vincent and Christ University (India) in Bangalore, Karnataka, India, on 5 February 2011. This record was broken by Shlomo on 14 November 2011 with 2,081 participants.

== Festivals and speaker platforms ==
- Vineeth Vincent is the official host and beat boxer of the Under 25 Summit
- He performed with The Austrian beat boxing group Bauchklang in 2009 and the Boxettes in 2010 among many other artists and bands.
- Vineeth was speaker and beat boxer at TEDxNITK where he took to the stage alongside Brodha V on 28 October 2012.
- Vineeth has been a TEDx speaker four times. He has spoken and performed at TEDxTirupathi in 2012. TEDxWalledCity in 2015.
- He has been a speaker and a performer for two Josh Talks' events held in Bangalore, in 2015 and Delhi, in 2016.
- Vineeth completed 1,250 shows as of December, 2016.
- He was the official emcee, moderator and beat boxer at Kyoorius Design Yatra 2016, held in Jaipur and 2017, held in Goa.
- Adding further to this list, Vineeth has hosted and performed at MI talks, Delhi held on 18 August 2017.
- He was the host and beat boxer for the launch of Namma Bengaluru logo at the Namma Bengaluru Habba, held on 24 Dec 2017, in front of Vidhana Soudha

== Judging/ Representing India ==
Vineeth represented India on the Judge's panel for the first ever ‘India Beat boxing championship which was held from 6 to 9 December 2016 in Nagaland. He was one of the five judges who came from across the globe to judge the battle.
