= Pontifical Athenaeum Dharmaram Vidya Kshetram =

Pontifical University in India

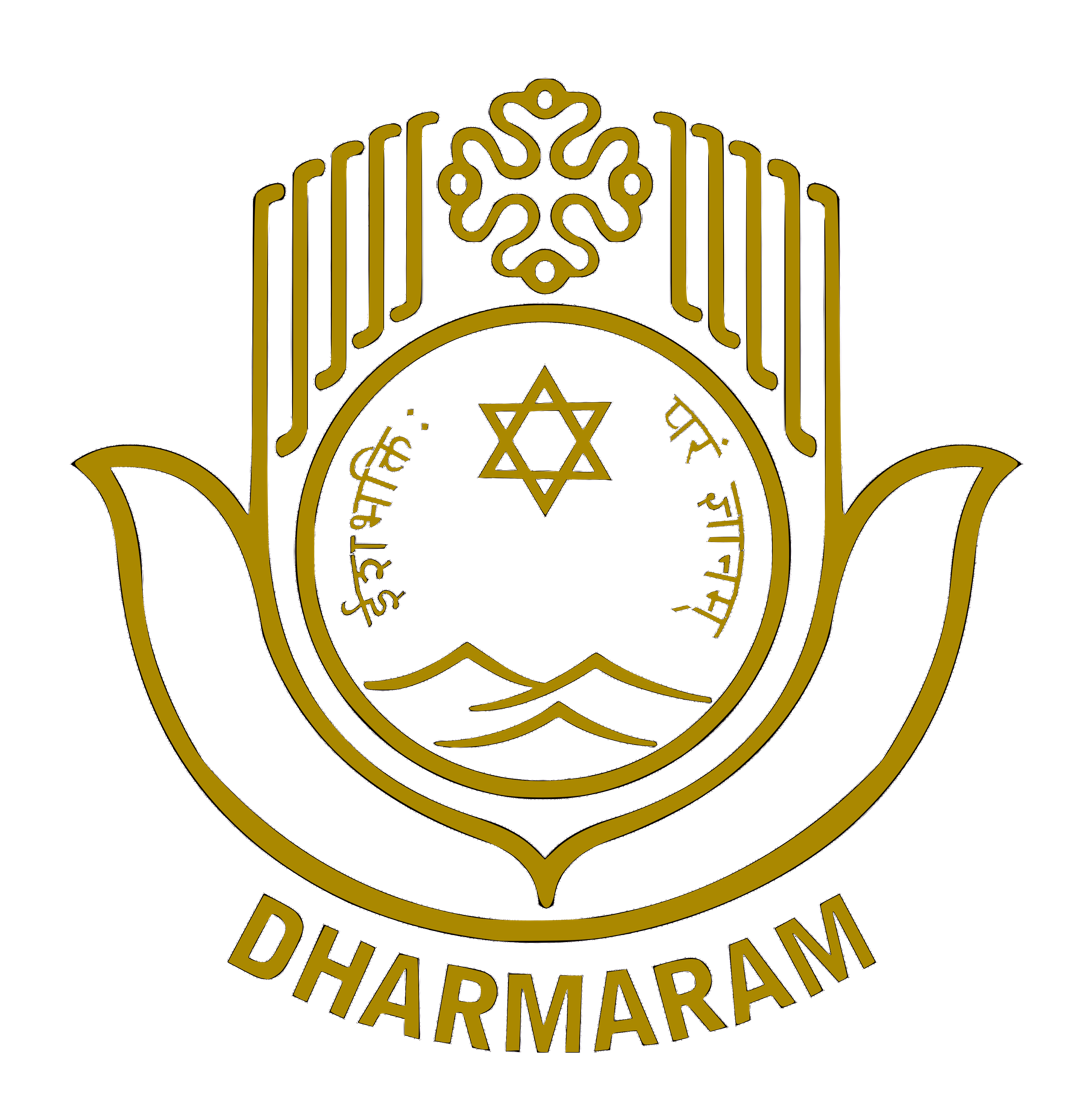
- Latin: Pontificium Athenaeum Dharmaram Vidya Kshetram
- Motto: ईशभक्तिः परं ज्ञानम् Isha Bhakti Paramjnanam
- Motto in English: "Devotion to Lord is Supreme Wisdom"
- Type: Pontifical Athenaeum
- Established: 1833 at Mannanam (193 years ago); 1918 moved to Chethipuzha (108 years ago); 21 June 1957 relocated to Bangalore (69 years ago)
- Affiliations: Holy See
- Chancellor: Major Archbishop Mar Raphel Thattil
- Vice-Chancellor: Very Rev. Dr. Paul Achandy CMI
- Rector: Rev. Dr. Saju Chackalackal CMI
- Pro-Chancellor: Mar Sebastian Adayanthrath
- Location: Bangalore, India; 12°56′10.8″N 77°36′10.5″E
- Campus: Urban
- Website: dvk.in
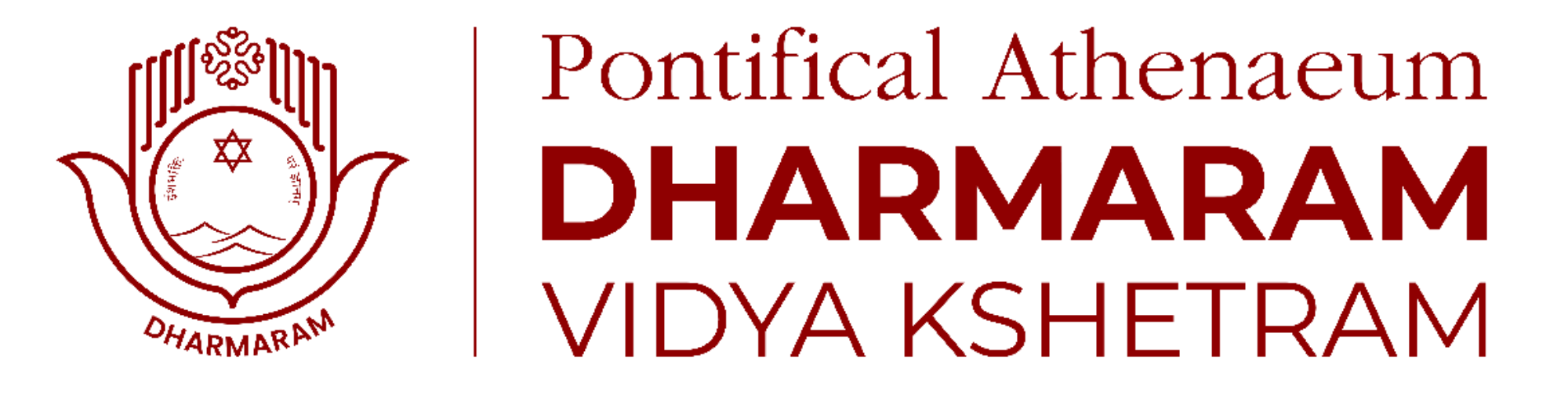

Pontifical Athenaeum Dharmaram Vidya Kshetram also known as Dharmaram or DVK is a Pontifical Athenaeum established by the Dicastery for Culture and Education, Vatican, as an ecclesiastical institute for higher learning and research. It is distinguished as one of only two Pontifical universities and athenaeums in Asia and is the only institution in India to hold this status. Renowned for its scholarship, it is empowered to grant degrees, including Licentiate and Doctorate in Philosophy and Theology.

The Institute of Formative Spirituality and Counselling at DVK is aggregated to the Faculty of Theology and degrees earned through the Institute are conferred by the Faculty.

Similarly, the Institute of Oriental Canon Law at DVK is aggregated to the Faculty of Eastern Canon Law of the Pontifical Oriental Institute under the Pontifical Gregorian University and grants a licentiate in Canon Law.

== History ==
Dharmaram, was established as a seminary in 1833 at Mannanam and later shifted to Chethipuzha. The institute at Chethipuzha, Kerala was moved to Bangalore in 1957. On 8 December 1965, it became affiliated to the Pontifical Gregorian University in Rome.

In 1976, Dharmaram was granted the charter to be recognised as a Pontifical Athenaeum by the Congregatio de Institutione Catholica Rome, through the decree Nobilissima Indiarum Gentes, thereby authorising it to confer degrees in theology. Subsequently, in 1983, the decree Antiquissima Indorum Philosophica further enabled the institution to award degrees in philosophy, marking a significant advancement in its academic standing and contribution to higher education in theological and philosophical disciplines. The academic degrees are given by authority of the Holy See.

== Faculties, institutes, and centres ==
Dharmaram hosts various specialist centres and institutes dedicated to theological, philosophical, and interdisciplinary studies. These centres facilitate research, academic collaboration, and specialised training, contributing to the institution’s mission of higher education and intellectual formation in philosophy, theology, and allied disciplines.

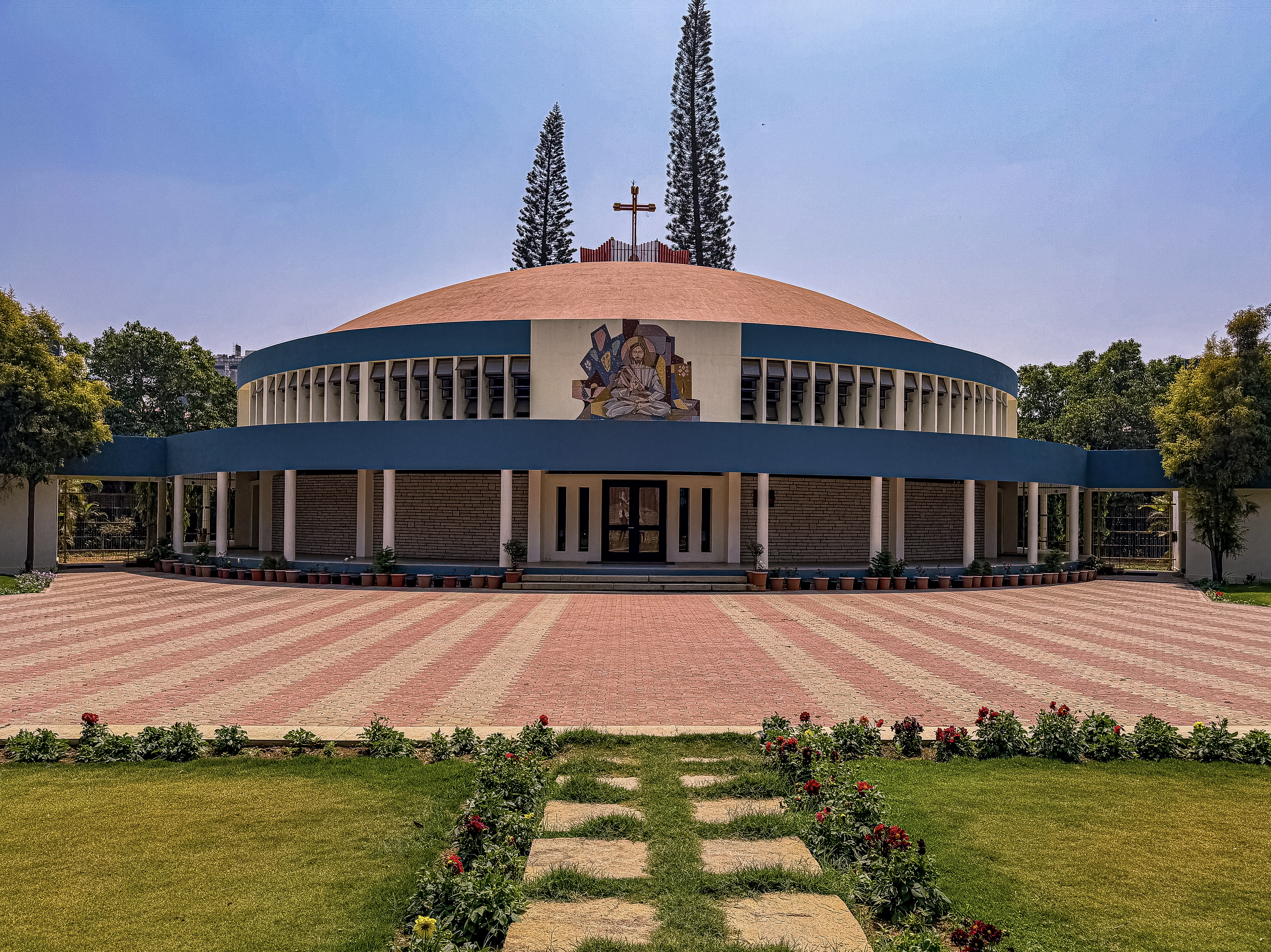
Dharmaram Chapel

=== Faculties and institutes ===
- Faculty of Theology
  - Department of Biblical Studies
  - Department of Systematic Theology
  - Department of Moral Theology
  - Department of Eastern Theology
  - Department of Missiology
- Faculty of Philosophy
- Institute of Oriental Canon Law
- Institute of Formative Spirituality and Counseling

=== Constituent centres ===
- Dharmaram College
- Jnanodaya
- Kuriakose Elias Chavara Study House (KECSH)
- Adhyayana
- DVK Research Center
- Centre for Biblical and Theological Studies (CBTS)
- Centre for Dalit Solidarity (CDS)
- Centre for Environmental Studies (CES)
- Centre for Science and Religion
- Centre for the Study and Research on Kuriakose Elias Chavara (CSRKEC)
- Centre for the study of World Religions (CSWR)
- Centre for Women Studies (CWS)
- Dharmaram Academy of Distance Education (DADE)
- Dharmaram Institute of Languages (DIL)
- Placid Podipara Centre for Eastern and Indian Christian Studies (PPCEICS)
- Atmodaya: Centre for Psycho-Spiritual Development
- Centre for Pastoral Leadership Studies
- Centre for the Study of Second Vatican Council
- DVK Central Library

==== Extension study centres ====
- Chavara Institute of Indian and Inter-Religious Studies (CIIS), Rome, Italy
- Chavara International Centre for Indian and Interreligious Studies (CICIIS), Sacramento, California, US

=== Affiliated institutes ===
The following institutes are affiliated with Pontifical Atheneaum Dharmaram Vidya Kshetram:

- Darsana Institute of Philosophy, Wardha
- Samanvaya Theology College, Bhopal
- Vidya Deep College, Bengaluru
- Carmelaram Theology College, Bengaluru
- De Paul Institute of Religion and Philosophy, Bengaluru
- Pushpaasharam Institute of Philosophy, Mysore
- MMI College of Theology, Chennai
- Kripalaya Institute of Philosophy and Religion, Mysore
- St Joseph's Institute of Philosophy, Mangalore
- Sacred Heart Philosophy College, Aluva
- Gyanadhara, Dominican Institute of Philosophy, Goa
- De Mazenod Institute of Philosophy, Thiruvallur
- Alpha Higher Institute of Religious Sciences, Thalassery

== Academic collaboration and partnerships ==
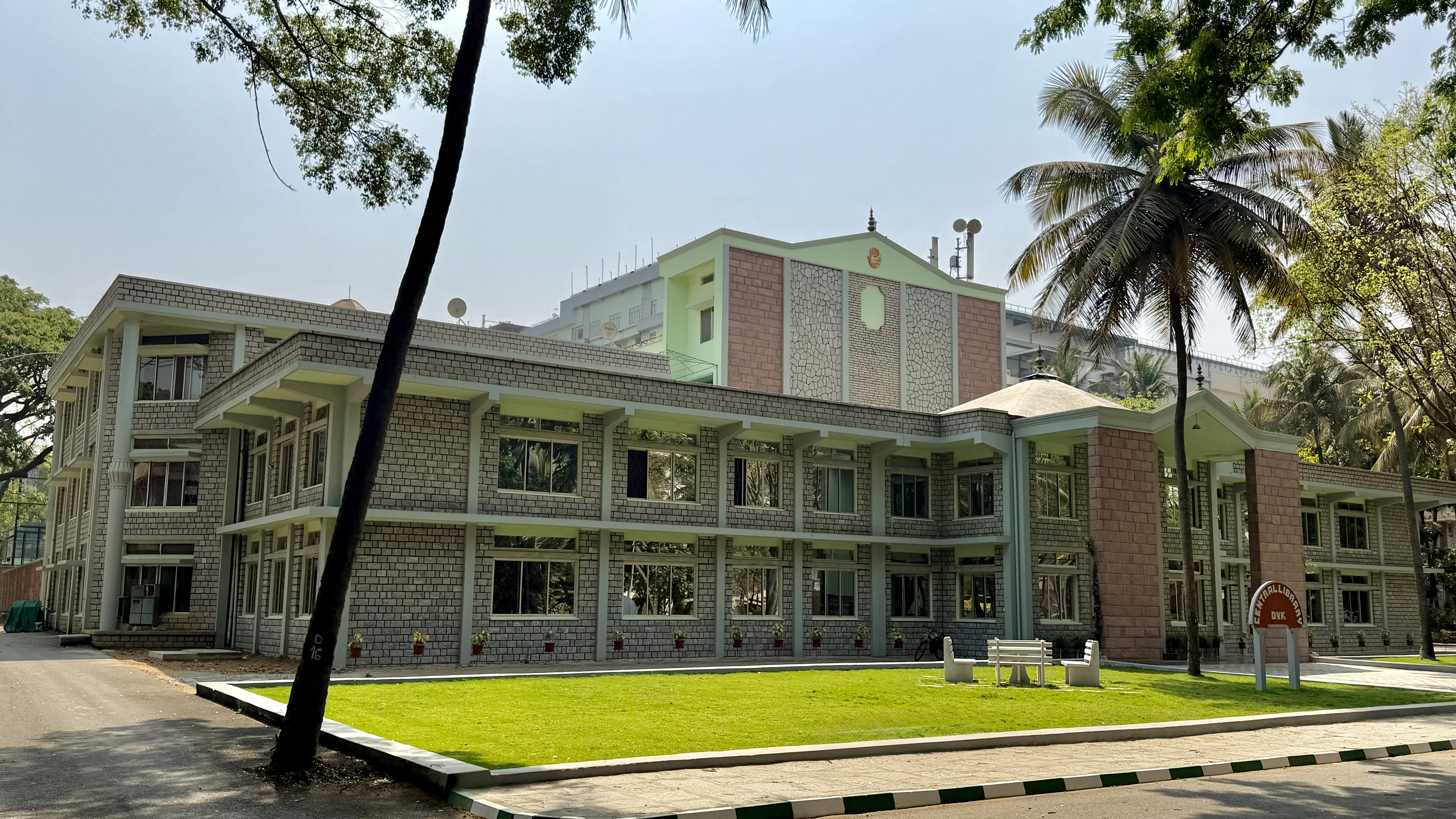
DVK Central Library - Asia‘s largest theological library

=== Christ University, India ===
Christ University was established in the 1960s by the CMI fathers of Dharmaram College on the Dharmaram campus. It is regarded as a daughter institution of Dharmaram. The Rector of Dharmaram serves as the Chancellor of Christ University.

Students who complete a Bachelor of Theology (BTh) at Dharmaram Vidya Kshetram (DVK) have the option to obtain a Master of Arts (MA) in Theology from Christ University through academic incorporation. Similarly, students pursuing a Bachelor of Philosophy (BPh) or Master of Philosophy (MPh) at DVK can opt for corresponding degrees at Christ University, allowing them to earn dual qualifications. This collaboration enhances academic flexibility, providing students with recognised degrees from both institutions.

=== KU Leuven, Belgium ===
A Memorandum of Understanding (MoU) has been signed between Dharmaram Vidya Kshetram (DVK), Bangalore, India, and the Katholieke Universiteit Leuven (KU Leuven), Belgium, facilitating academic collaboration between the institutions.

The first MoU was signed between the Hoger Instituut voor Wijsbegeerte (HIW), Faculty of Philosophy, KU Leuven, and the Faculty of Philosophy, DVK, on 23 May 2007, and was subsequently renewed in 2011 and 2025 enabling the exchange of faculty and students based on mutual recognition of degrees.

Similarly, an MoU was signed between the Faculty of Theology, KU Leuven, and the Faculty of Theology, DVK, with the Rector and Dean of KU Leuven and the President and Dean of DVK as signatories. This agreement also allows for legitimate academic exchanges between the institutions.

=== Pontifical Oriental Institute, Italy ===
The Institute of Oriental Canon Law (IOCL) is aggregated to the Faculty of Eastern Canon Law at the Pontifical Oriental Institute in Rome. IOCL offers three academic programmes: the Licentiate in Oriental Canon Law (LOCL), awarded by the Pontifical Oriental Institute, Rome; and the Diploma (DOCL) and Certificate (COCL) in Oriental Canon Law, issued by DVK. The LOCL degree qualifies graduates to pursue a doctorate, teach in major seminaries or faculties of theology, and hold ecclesiastical offices requiring expertise in Canon Law.

=== Tilburg University, Netherlands ===
The DVK Faculty of Theology and the Tilburg School of Catholic Theology at Tilburg University, Netherlands, have entered into a Memorandum of Understanding (MoU) to promote academic cooperation in the field of theology, with the aim of strengthening collaboration through faculty and student exchanges, joint research initiatives, academic events, and other scholarly activities of mutual interest, reflecting a shared commitment to advancing theological education and research within an international academic framework.

=== University of Opole, Poland ===
The Faculty of Theology at the University of Opole, Poland signed a Memorandum of Understanding (MoU) with the Dharmaram Vidya Kshetram (DVK) Pontifical Athenaeum of Philosophy and Theology in Bangalore, India, on 27 January 2025, aimed at strengthening academic collaboration through joint scientific and educational research, exchange of academic staff and students, sharing of scientific information, literature, curricula and publications, and the organization of joint seminars, conferences, and guest lectures, formalizing and expanding long-standing informal cooperation between the two institutions.

== Dharmaram Publications ==
Dharmaram Publications publishes books dealing with theological, scriptural and philosophical topics in Christian as well as non-Christian traditions. Dharmaram regularly publishes many academic journals including,

- Journal of Dharma: Dharmaram Journal of Religions and Philosophies
- Asian Horizons: Dharmaram Journal of Theology
- Vinayasadhana: Dharmaram Journal of Psycho-Spiritual Formation
- Iustitia: Dharmaram Journal of Canon Law
- Herald of the East: Dharmaram Journal of Chavara Studies

== People ==
=== Notable faculty ===
- Thomas Aykara, Former Rector and Professor of Philosophy
- Roger Burggraeve, Professor of Moral Theology
- Antony John Baptist, Old Testament
- Saju Chackalackal, Professor of Philosophy and Rector
- Mathew Chandrankunnel, Professor of Philosophy of Science
- Kurian Kachapally, Professor of Philosophy
- James F. Keenan, Professor of Moral Theology
- A. Mathias Mundadan, Former Rector and Professor of Church History
- Jose Nandhikkara, Professor of Philosophy
- Joseph Pathrapankal, Professor of New Testament
- Mar Emmanuel Giles Pothanamuzhi, Bishop of Mananthavady, former Rector and Professor of Philosophy
- Virginia Rajakumari, New Testament
- William Sweet, Philosophy
- Mar Jonas Thaliath, Bishop of Rajkot, Former Rector and Professor
- Mar Thomas Tharayil, Metropolitan Archbishop of Changanacherry, Formative Spirituality and Counselling

=== Alumni ===
- Moran Mor Baselios Cardinal Cleemis, The Major Archbishop of the Syro-Malankara Catholic Church
- Saju Chackalackal, Philosopher
- Susai Jesu, The Metropolitan Archbishop of Archdiocese of Keewatin–Le Pas in Canada
- Kurian Kachappilly, Philosopher
- Mar Awgin Kuriakose, The Metropolitan of the Chaldean Syrian Church
- Abraham V. M., former Vice-chancellor of Christ University, Bangalore
- Rozario Menezes, Bishop of Diocese of Lae in Papua New Guinea
- Jose Nandhikkara, Philosopher
- Mar Joseph Pastor Neelankavil, Bishop of Eparchy of Sagar
- Joseph J. Palackal, Liturgist and Indic musicologist
- Mar Antony Prince Panengaden, The Metropolitan Archbishop of Archeparchy of Shamshabad
- Paul Poovathingal, Carnatic artist and first vocologist in India
- Joshy George Pottackal, Auxiliary bishop in Mainz in Germany; the first Roman Catholic bishop in a German diocese who was not born in Europe
- Mar Jose Pulickal, Bishop of Eparchy of Kanjirappally
- Virginia Rajakumari, Biblical scholar, Congregation of Sisters of St. Anne, Bangalore (SAB)

== See also ==
Dharmaram College, a major seminary of the Carmelites of Mary Immaculate congregation in Bangalore.
