= Rahul Rajesh =

Indian poet (born 1976)

Rahul Rajesh (born 1976 in Dumka, Jharkhand) is an Indian poet writing in Hindi and a translator. His poems and articles have been published in leading Hindi literary magazines and national dailies like Vaagartha, Gyanodaya, Hans, Kathaadesh, Bayaa, Aajkal, Samkaalin Bhaartiya Saahitya, Indian Literature (English), Saakshaatkaar, Vipaashaa, Saakshya, Doaabaa, Kaadambini, Akshar Parva, Pahal, Vasudha, Samved, Vartamaan Saahitya, Dastak, Kahan, Anoupcharika, Hindustaan, BBC Patrika, Jansattaa, Sahaaraa Samay, Prabhaat Khabar, Deshbandhu, Dainik Bhaaskar, Nai Duniya, Aaj, Ranchi Express and others.

His poems have also been translated into Marathi, Oriya, Punjabi and Urdu.

Basant Badal Deta Hai Muhavre (2011) is Rahul Rajesh's Hindi translation of Ankur Betageri's English Poems. Rahul Rajesh's first collection of poems Sirf Ghaas Nahi (2013) was published recently by Sahitya Akademi, the National Academy of Letters, to much acclaim.
