= Sacred Heart Cathedral, Rajkot =

Sacred Heart Cathedral
- Sacred Heart of Jesus Syro-Malabar Cathedral
- Prem Mandir
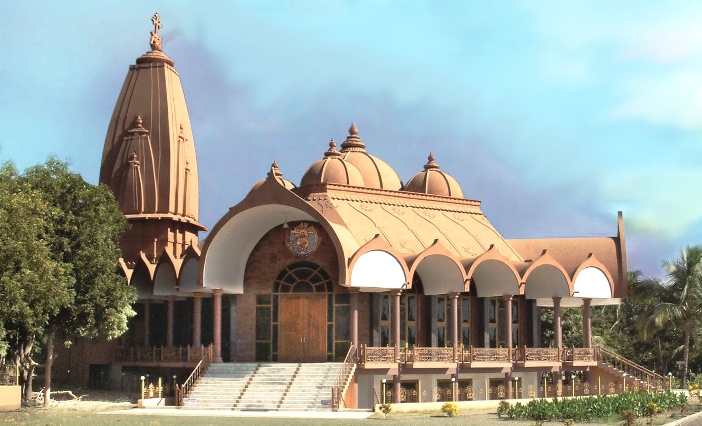

- Location of Prem Mandir in Gujarat
- 22.276079°N 70.758101°E
- Location: Kalawad Road, Rajkot, Gujarat
- Country: India
- Denomination: Syro-Malabar
- Website: www.rajkotdiocese.org

History
- Status: Cathedral
- Founded: 8 December 2000

Architecture
- Functional status: active

Administration
- Province: Archdiocese of Gandhinagar
- Diocese: Syro-Malabar Catholic Eparchy of Rajkot

Clergy
- Bishop(s): José Chittooparambil, CMI

The Sacred Heart Cathedral is a cathedral of the Syro-Malabar Catholic rite in Rajkot. It is also known as Prem Mandir, meaning 'temple of love' in Hindi and Gujarati. The cathedral, which is dedicated to the Sacred Heart of Jesus, is situated near the bishop's house.

The striking aspect of the cathedral is its architecture which predominantly resembles a traditional Indian temple, but in fact blends architectural features of various religions. The cathedral was designed by Ashwinbhai Sanghvi and the glass work was done by Balan. It has domes and a pinnacle, and its arches and granite carvings are inspired by Indian mosques. There is a mosaic of Jesus seated in a meditation pose above a lotus like an Indian holy man. The symbols depicted on the windows and doors are flame, flute and lotus. Each of the church's five domes is engraved with symbols of other religions. An oriental-style cross on a lotus flower stands atop the main dome.
