= Pragathi Dharmaram =

Pragathi Dharmaram Earlier known as D. Dharmaram
- village
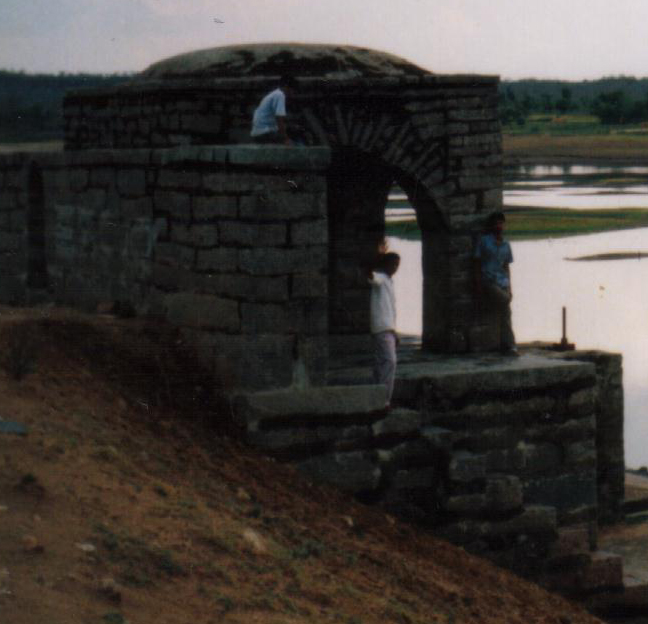
- Pedda tuumu

- Location in Telangana, India Pragathi Dharmaram (India)
- Coordinates: 18.059936°N 78.500388°E
- Country: India
- State: Telangana
- District: Medak

Area
  - Total: 240 km^{2} (93 sq mi)

Population (2001)
  - Total: 4,999
  - Density: 21/km^{2} (54/sq mi)

Languages
  - Official: Telugu
- Time zone: UTC+5:30 (IST)
- Postal code: 502101
- Vehicle registration: TG
- Literacy: 51.37%
- Website: www.ddharmaram.com

Pragathi Dharmaram is a village situated in Medak district, India, with Ramayampet as its mandal headquarters.

== ZPHS High School ==
ZPHS (Zilla Parishat High School), Dharmaram is one of the oldest schools in Medak district.
