= Eparchy of Rajkot =

Syro-Malabar Catholic eparchy in Gujarat, India

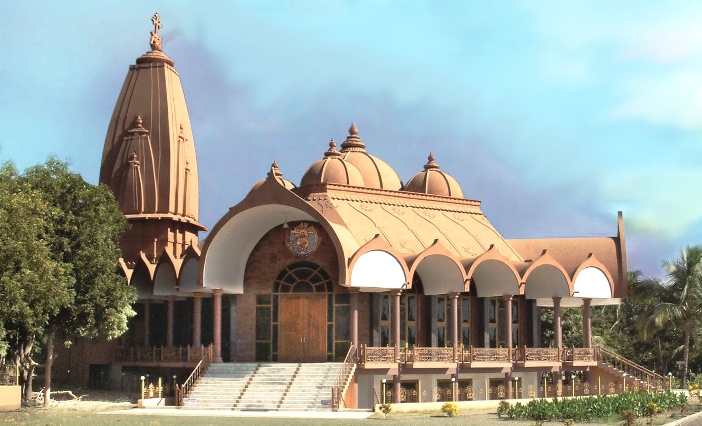
- Sacred Heart Syro-Malabar Cathedral, Rajkot

- Coat of arms

Location
- Country: India
- Territory: Saurashtra and Kutch
- Ecclesiastical province: Archeparchy of Kalyan
- Coordinates: 22°16′34″N 70°45′28″E

Statistics
- Area: 109,950 km^{2} (42,450 sq mi)
- Population: Total; Catholics: (as of 2010); 16,025,000; 13,000 (0.1%)

Information
- Denomination: Syro-Malabar Catholic Church
- Rite: East Syriac Rite
- Cathedral: Sacred Heart Syro-Malabar Cathedral, Rajkot
- Patron saint: Sacred Heart of Jesus

Current leadership
- Pope: Leo XIV
- Major Archbishop: Mar Raphael Thattil
- Bishop: Mar Jose Chittooparambil CMI
- Metropolitan Archbishop: Mar Sebastian Vaniyapurackal

Map
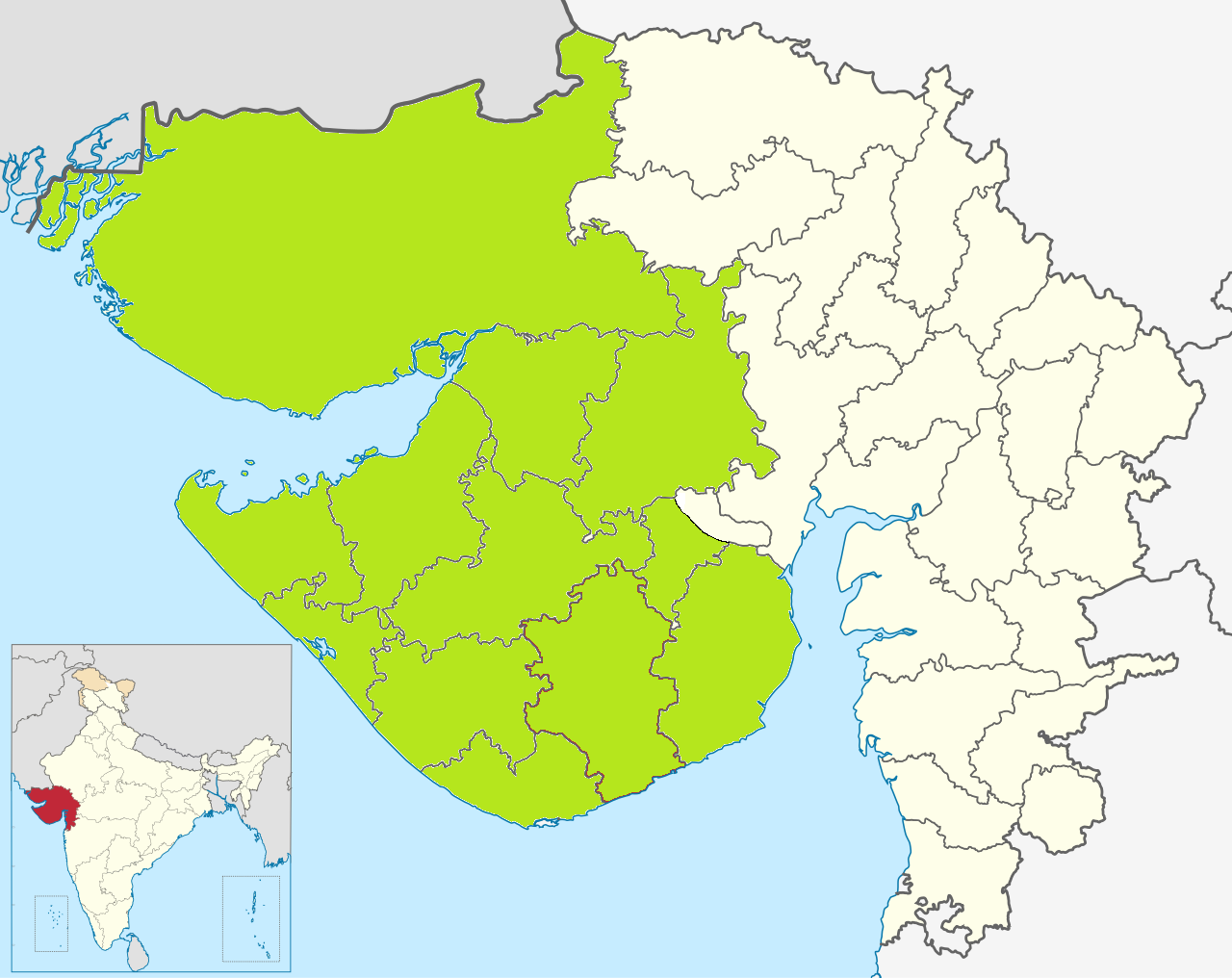

Website
- Website of the Diocese

The Eparchy of Rajkot is an Eastern Catholic eparchy in Gujarat, India, under the Syro-Malabar Catholic Church. It was created in 1977.

The Eparchy was created by Pope Paul VI's Bull "De recta fidelium" in 1977, separating it from the Diocese of Ahmedabad. Its cathedral is Sacred Heart Syro-Malabar Cathedral, Rajkot. From 28th of August 2025 decreed by the Major Archbishop of Syro-Malabar Church, it is a suffragan Eparchy of the Syro-Malabar Archeparchy of Kalyan.

== History ==
On 16 July 2010, Pope Benedict XVI named Mar Jose Chittooparambil as the bishop of the Syro-Malabar Catholic eparchy of Rajkot. The bishop-elect was born in 1954 in Neeleswaram, India, was ordained to the priesthood in 1985, and is currently Prior General of St. Xavier's Province in Rajkot. He succeeds bishop Mar Gregory Karotemprel, whose resignation the Pope accepted upon having reached the age limit. (All bishops of local churches, or dioceses, whose wider churches are in communion with the Pope, must submit their resignation for possible acceptance at age 75, though the resignations are usually only accepted later.)

== Prelates ==
Eparchs of Rajkot

Sl.no	Name	Designation	Year of appointment	Last year of service
1	Mar Jonas Thaliath,C.M.I	Bishop	1977	1981
2	Mar Gregory Karotemprel,C.M.I	Bishop	1983	2010
3	Mar José Chittooparambil,C.M.I	Bishop	2010	Present

== Schools ==
In early 2026, the Eparchy runs several teaching institutes, including 62 primary schools, 43 high schools and other facilities. The primary and high schools serve almost 37,000 students.

- St. Xavier's High School, Bhuj
- Christ School Rajkot
- Saint Paul's School, Rajkot
