= Jose ben Saul =

Jewish rabbi

Jose ben Saul was a Jewish rabbi who lived in Galilee in the third century CE. He is considered an amora of the first generation after the codification of the Mishnah. Jose is known chiefly as a transmitter of the sayings and traditions of the patriarch Judah ha-Nasi, whose disciple he was. These as well as his own sayings are further transmitted by Joshua ben Levi and by Hiyya ben Gamda. In one place the following order is given: Simon ben Pazzi says in the name of Joshua ben Levi in the name of Rabbi Jose ben Saul in the name of Judah ha-Nasi in the name of the holy assembly of Jerusalem. The Jerusalem Talmud has preserved only one anecdote of his in the Aramaic. His brothers were Johanan ben Saul and Halafta ben Saul, with the former of whom he used to hold halakhic controversies.
