= P. A. Sampath Kumar =

Indian New Testament scholar

Reverend Father P. A. Sampath Kumar, RCM
- Born: Ponnusamy Antoniraj Sampath Kumar; October 25, 1951; Velanthangal, Madras State
- Died: 9 March 2015 (aged 63); Pondicherry
- Burial place: Immaculate Conception Cathedral, Pondicherry
- Education: B.Th., M.Th. (Urbaniana); D. Théol. (Strasbourg)
- Alma mater: St. Peter's Pontifical Seminary, Bangalore; École Biblique, Jerusalem (Israel); fr:Faculté de théologie catholique de Strasbourg (France)
- Occupations: Priest, Professor
- Years active: 1977-2015 (38 years)
- Known for: New Testament exegesis and Asian Christian Studies
- Parent(s): Smt. J. D. Vijiambal and Sri P. Ponnusamy
- Religion: Christianity
- Church: Catholic Church
- Ordained: 7 July 1977
- Congregations served: Pondicherry (1977–1981); Mel Sithamur (1981–1982); Gingee (1982–1983); Kilputhuppattu (2005-2006)
- Offices held: President, Society for Biblical Studies in India (1996–1998); Professor, St. Mark's Major inter-diocesan Seminary, Bangui (Central African Republic) (1990–1991); St. Peter's Pontifical Institute of Theology, Bangalore (1991–1996); United Theological College, Bangalore (1996–1998); Department of Christianity, University of Madras, Chennai (1998–2001); Escande Chair in Asian Christian Studies, Pondicherry University, Pondicherry (2004–2015); Assistant Director, National Biblical Catechetical and Liturgical Centre, Bangalore (1996–1998)
- Title: Reverend Father

P. Antonyraj Sampath Kumar (25 October 1951 – 9 March 2015) was an Indian New Testament scholar who was the president of the Society for Biblical Studies in India, and was the Escande Chair of Asian Christian Studies at Pondicherry University and was the Chief Warden of the Pondicherry University Hostels. He was a Roman Catholic priest of the Archdiocese of Pondicherry and Cuddalore.

== Writings ==
- Les récits de miracle dans les Actes des Apôtres
- The Rich and the Poor in Luke-Acts
- History of Pondicherry Mission: An Outline
- Current Trends in Indian Biblical Studies

== Studies ==
Sampath Kumar pursued postgraduate studies at St. Peter's Pontifical Seminary, Bengaluru from 1983 to 1985 in the discipline of New Testament after which he went to Strasbourg and registered as a doctoral candidate at the University of Strasbourg, Strasbourg for research in New Testament exegesis. In 1990, the university conferred upon him the doctoral degree based on his thesis. For some time he was Professor of New Testament at the United Theological College, Bengaluru and also tutored Babu Immanuel, C. I. David Joy and K. Suraj Kumar and Rev.K.Balakrishnan who were pursuing post-graduate studies during that period.

== Publications ==
=== Books ===
- History of Pondicherry Mission: An Outline (a translation from French of the book Le précis de l’histoire de la mission de Pondicherry, by Lafranez, MEP), Department of Christian Studies, University of Madras, Chennai, 2000.
- An introduction to Christian Studies(Edited with J.T.K Daniel) all India Association for Christian Higher Education(AIACHE), New Delhi, 2001
- Bible Kattum Anmeegam, (Tamil), Mission Press, Pondicherry, 2004
- Darshanik: Studies in the New Testament, Escande Research Centre for Religion Culture, Pondicherry 605014, 2006
- Villianur Vidivalli: 30th Special Book (editor), Our Lady of Lourdes Shrine, Villianur, 2008.
- A Priest to His Brother Priests(Ed) Escande Chair in Asian Christian Studies, Pondicherry University,2010

=== Articles ===
- "Society and Religious Tensions a Case Study: The Maccabean Period", Jeevadhara, 29(1999)48-53.
- "Bandits and Messiahs: Social Revolts in the Time of Jesus", Jeevadhara, 30(2000)72-89.
- Discovering the Asian Paradigm for Advocacy" in The Prophetic Path to the New Millennium Through Social Advocacy(edited by Anthony Rogers), Manila: FABC Office for human development, 2000, pp31–39.
- Bible and children, Vaihari(2001)3-15
- The Prohibition of Foreign Mission: A Study of Mt10:5-6, Vidyajyoti 65(2001)245-258.
- "History of Indian Biblical Hermeneutics", Word and Worship, NBCLC Ruby Jubilee 1967-2007, vol.41, (March–April 2008) Bangalore

=== Papers Presented ===
==== International Seminars ====
- Paper on Lecture indienne de la Bible (Indian Way of Reading the Bible) - Presented at the French Bible Association Meeting, Strasbourg, France, on 16 June 1999.
- Paper on Discovering Asian Paradigm for Advocacy presented at Consultation on Advocacy for Justice and Peace conducted by the Federation of Asian Bishops’ Conference (FABC) at Redemptorist Centre, Pattaya City, Thailand, on 28 August 2000.
- Paper on Indian Reading of the Bible at the French Bible Association Conference held at Strasbourg University, 15 February 2006.
- Paper presented at the International Seminar organized by the chair in Asian Christian Studies on Italian Contribution to Religion and Culture at Pondicherry University on 8 February 2008.

==== National Seminars ====
- Paper on Indian Exegesis presented at the National conference of the Society for biblical Studies, UBS, Pune on 2 April 1999.
- Paper on Historical Jesus presented at the National Seminar, Department of Christian Studies, University of Madras, on 25 October 1999.
- Paper on Bible and Culture presented at the colloquium of Bishops and Theologians, held at NBCLC, Bangalore, on 14 March 2000.

==== Local Seminars ====
The chair organized on Saturdays Seminars of the educated people of Pondicherry and its surroundings at the Escande Research Centre for Religion and Culture, Kanagachettikulam, Pondicherry 605014. This Centre is attached to the chair in Asian Christian Studies, Pondicherry University.

- Jesus our Life: spiritual and Mystical Study of the Gospel of John Part I, by Dr. P. A. Sampathkumar, on 07-07-2007.
- Jesus our Life: spiritual and Mystical Study of the Gospel of John Part II, by Dr. P. A. Sampathkumar, on 21-07-2007.
- The American and Syrian Christians in Coramandal Coast: Historical Perspective, by Fr. Sebastian, M.Phil Student, on 28-07-2007.
- Teaching of Catholic catechism I Schools: Methodologies and Orientations, by Fr. Bruno Saint Girons and Mr. Mudiappan, M.Phil Students on 11-08-2007.
- Mission in the Bible by Fr. L. Legrand, Professor Emeritus, St. Peter's Pontifical Institute, Bangalore, on 25-08-2007.
- World Religions: Spiritual Insights form Saiva Siddhanta, by Dr. B. Shantha Kumari, Department of Philosophy, Pondicherry University, on 15-09-2007.
- Jesus Christ, Yesterday, Today and Tomorrow, Fr. Dominic, Arul Ashram, Chinna Kalapet, on 17-10-2007.
- World Religions: Study of Hinduism and Its Practices, by Dr. K. Srinivas, Department of Philosophy, Pondicherry University, on 10-11-2007.
- Study of the Encyclicals of the late Pope John Paul II, by Fr. Joseph Raj, Coimbatore, on 24-11-2007.
- Season of Advent: Historical and Liturgical Perspective, by Fr. S. Arokiaraj, Tindivanam, on 15-12-2007.

These seminars were well attended by the university students, educated people of all religions of Pondicherry and other places. Most of them were regulars of the seminars.

== Positions held ==
- President of the Indian Society for Biblical Studies in India (1996–1998).
- Member of the editorial committee for Indian journal of Spirituality, published by the Indian institute of Spirituality, Rajajinagar, Bangalore.
- Book Review Editor for Word and Worship, published by National Biblical, Catechetical and Liturgical Centre (NBCLC), Bangalore.
- Assistant Director for Bible Correspondence Course at National Biblical, Catechetical and Liturgical Centre (NBCLC) (1999–2001).
- Member of the senate of the Archdiocese of Pondicherry and Cuddalore (2005- ).
- President of the Moral Committee of the Pondicherry Institute of Medical sciences (PIMS), Kanagachettikuam, Pondicherry (2004- ).
- Consultant of the Theological commission of the Catholic Bishop's Conference of India (CBCI).
- Consultant for the Office for Human Development of the Federation of Asian Bishop's Conference (FABC). Manila, Philippines.
- Member of Christian Life Commission for the Latin rite Bishop's conference of India (2001–2004).
- Doctoral Thesis Guide for South Asian Theological Research Institute, Bangalore.
- Examiner for the Doctoral Thesis at the department of Christian Studies, University of Madras and at the chair of Christianity, Madurai-Kamaraj University, Madurai.
- President of the Catholic Biblical Association of India from 2006.
- Director of the Escande Centre for Religion and Culture – an Institution attached to the chair in Asian Christian Studies, Pondicherry University from 2006.
- Member of I Internal Quality Assurance Cell (IQAC) for the remaining XI Plan period from the years 2010-12.

Professional and academic associations
Preceded by K. V. Mathew, MMTSC, 1994-1996	President, Society for Biblical Studies in India; 1996–1998	Succeeded by D. J. Muthunayagom, CSI, 1998-2000
