= Jose ben Akabya =

Rabbi

Jose ben Aqabya (Heb. Yose ben Aqabya or Yose ben Yakov; Aram. Issi bar Akiba) was a rabbi and Tanna whose career spanned the early third century CE. The name "Issi" or "Assa" is derived from "Jose," and was borne by many tannaim and amoraim; hence the confusion that prevails in the Talmud concerning the identity of each of them, the same halakhic or aggadic saying being attributed sometimes to one and sometimes to another of that name. Thus the prohibition against riding on a mule is reported in the Yerushalmi in the name of Issi ben Aqabya, while in the Tosefta it is attributed to Issi ha-Babli, who is undoubtedly identical with Issi ben Judah. Bacher supposes that Issi ben Aqabya was the brother of Hananiah ben Aqabya, the interpreter ("meturgeman") of Judah ha-Nasi. Issi was a diligent student of the Bible, and some of his interpretations have been preserved in the midrashic literature.

== Resources ==
- "JOSE (ISI, ISSI) BEN AḲABYA (AKIBA) - JewishEncyclopedia.com". www.jewishencyclopedia.com. Schechter, Solomon and Isaac Broydé. "Jose (Isi, Issi) ben Akabya". Jewish Encyclopedia. Funk and Wagnalls, 1901–1906, citing:

- Heilprin, Seder ha-Dorot, ii. 225;
- Bacher, Ag. Tan. ii. 371.
