= Jose Kurishinkal =

Indian cricket umpire

Personal information
- Full name: Jose Kurishinkal
- Born: 8 April 1956 (age 70); Cochin, Kerala, India

Umpiring information
- ODIs umpired: 3 (1994–1996)
- Source: ESPNcricinfo, 25 May 2014

Jose Kurishinkal (born 8 April 1956) is a former Indian cricket umpire. At the international level, he stood in three ODI games from 1994 to 1996.

== See also ==
- List of One Day International cricket umpires
