= Journal of Dharma =

- Discipline: Philosophy
- Language: English
- Edited by: Mathew Attumkal

Publication details
- History: 1975–present
- Publisher: Dharmaram Vidya Kshetram (India)
- Frequency: Quarterly

Standard abbreviations
- ISO 4: J. Dharma

Indexing
- ISSN: 0253-7222
- LCCN: 76-913542
- OCLC no.: 2350712

Links
- Journal homepage; Online archive

The Journal of Dharma is a quarterly peer-reviewed academic journal covering discussion and debates on philosophies and religions. It was established in 1975 and is published by Dharmaram Vidya Kshetram. The editor-in-chief is Dr. Mathew Attumkal (Dharmaram Vidya Kshetram). Besides regular articles, the journal also includes book reviews of recently released books in philosophy and religion.

== Abstracting and indexing ==
The journal is abstracted and indexed in:

- ATLA Religion Database
- Arts and Humanities Citation Index
- Current Contents/Arts & Humanities
- Philosopher's Index
- Scopus
