= Christ University =

Private research university in Karnataka, India

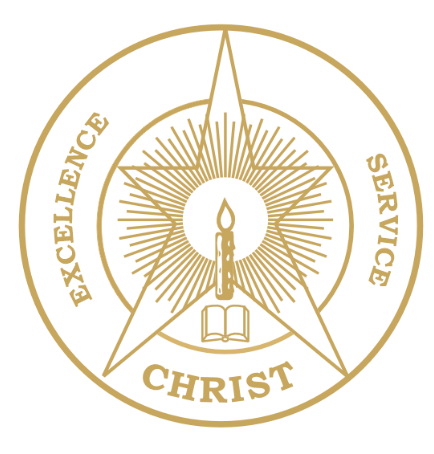
- Latin: Christus Universitas
- Other names: Christ Deemed University, Christ (Deemed to be University), CU
- Former name: Christ College (Autonomous)
- Motto: Excellence and Service
- Type: Private, Deemed University
- Established: 1969; 57 years ago
- Founder: Carmelites of Mary Immaculate (CMI)
- Parent institution: Dharmaram
- Accreditation: NAAC 'A+'
- Affiliations: UGC, AICTE, NCTE,COA, BCI
- Religious affiliation: Christian (Syro Malabar Catholic Church)
- Chancellor: Rev. (Dr.) Saju Chackalackal, CMI
- Vice-Chancellor: Rev. (Dr.) Joseph C. C., CMI
- Academic staff: 1148
- Administrative staff: 400+
- Students: 30,777
- Undergraduates: 23,311
- Postgraduates: 7,466
- Doctoral students: 1,266
- Location: Dharmaram College Post, Hosur Road, Bengaluru, Karnataka, 560029, India; 12.9342°N 77.6050°E
- Campus: 148.17 acres; Urban
- Language: English
- Nickname: Christites
- Website: https://www.christuniversity.in
- Locations in India Christ University (India)

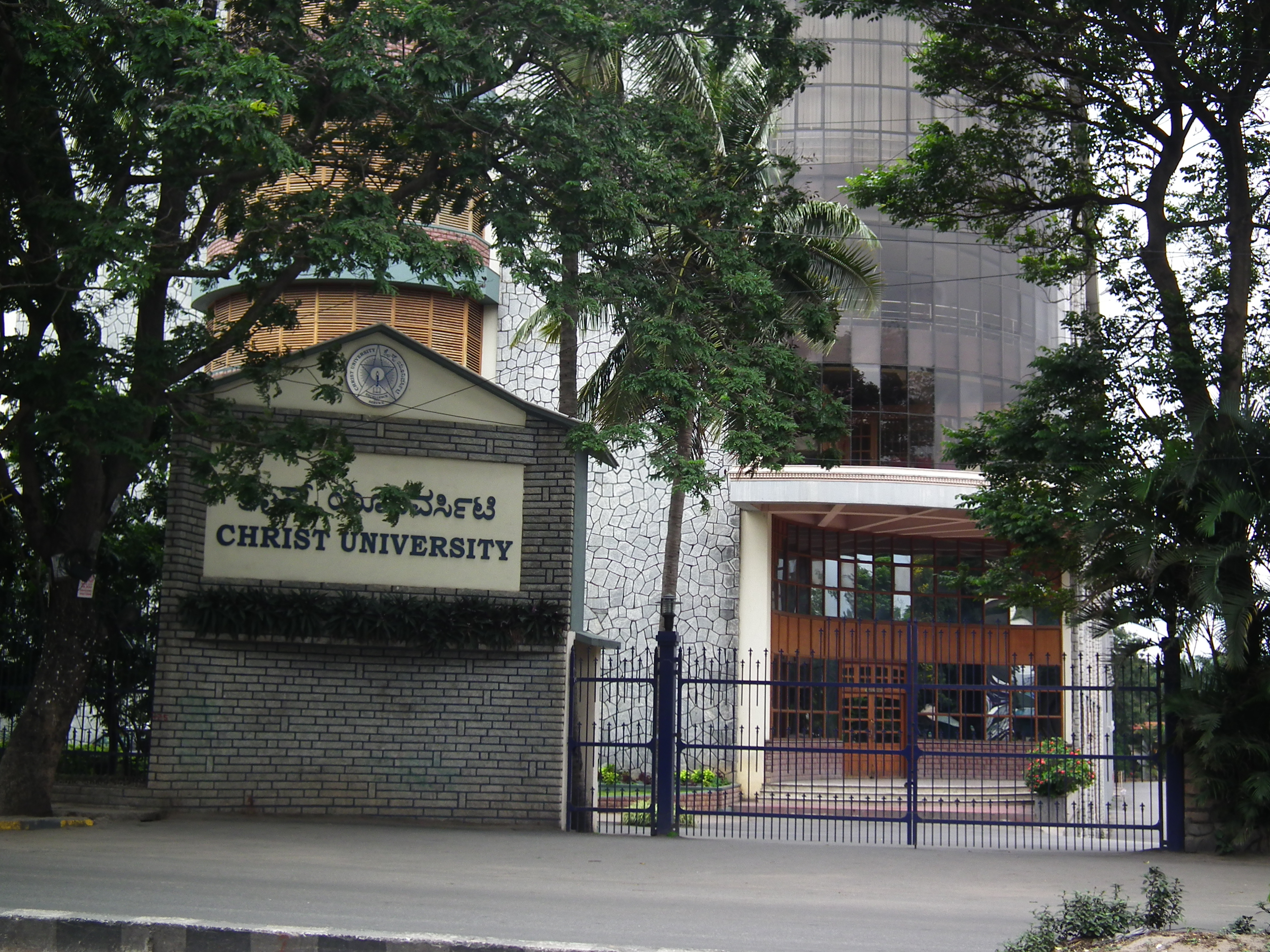
Christ University - Main Campus Gate

Christ University, officially Christ (Deemed to be University) is an elite private, deemed, research university located in Bengaluru, Karnataka, India. Founded in 1969 by the CMI Fathers on the Dharmaram Campus, it was declared as an institution deemed to be university under section 3 of UGC Act 1956.

CHRIST is under the management of the priests of the Catholic religious order, Carmelites of Mary Immaculate (CMI), part of Syro Malabar Major Archiepiscopal Church. In 2016, the university was accredited by National Assessment and Accreditation Council with A+ Grade.

== History ==
Christ University was born out of the educational vision of St. Kuriakose Elias Chavara, an educationist and social reformer of the nineteenth century in South India. Chavara founded the first indigenous Catholic congregation Carmelites of Mary Immaculate (CMI) in 1831, which administers Christ (Deemed to be University). Established in 1969 as Christ College, the University Grants Commission (UGC) of India conferred autonomy to Christ College in 2004 and identified it as an "institution with potential for excellence" in 2006. In 2008 under section 3 of the UGC Act, 1956, the Ministry of Human Resource Development of the Government of India, declared the institution a "deemed to be university" in the name and style of Christ University. Christ was one of the first institutions in India to be accredited in 1998 by the National Assessment and Accreditation Council (NAAC), and subsequently in 2004, 2016 and 2022 had been awarded Grade 'A+' on 4-point scale.

== Campus ==
- Bangalore Central Campus

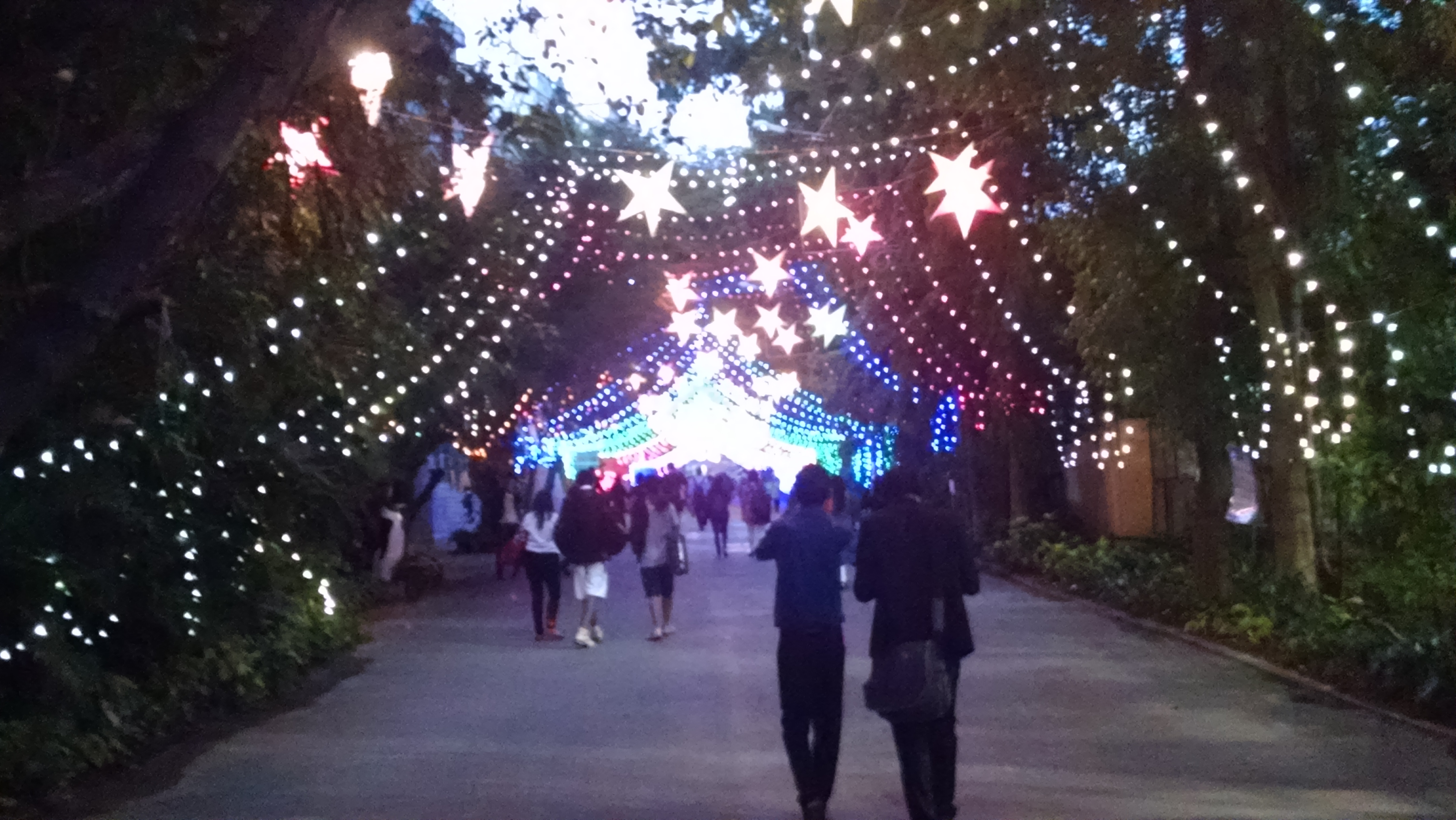
CHRIST University during Christmas

The university's main campus is spread over 25 acres (10 ha) and is part of the 100-acre (40 ha) Dharmaram Campus in the central part of Bangalore city. It is on the extension of Hosur Road (NH 7) opposite the Bangalore Dairy Circle Flyover. The city campus is close to residential localities such as BTM Layout, a residential and commercial area; Koramangala, another large neighborhood; and Jayanagar, one of the largest residential neighborhoods in Bangalore.

- Bangalore Kengeri Campus

In 2009, the university opened its Kengeri campus, which is spread over 90 acres at Kengeri on the Bangalore-Mysore Expressway NH 275 and houses the School of Engineering and Technology; the PU Residential College; the School of Business and Management, which offers Master of Business Administration (MBA) and Bachelor of Business Administration (BBA) programs; the School of Social Sciences offering Bachelor of Science in psychology with Honours; as well as the School of Architecture, which was started officially from 2017.

- Bangalore Bannerghatta Road Campus

The university also has a campus in Hulimavu on Bannerghatta Road, inaugurated in May, 2016. The campus provides courses across disciplines like Liberal Arts, Business and Management, Political Science, Economics and English. The campus provides wide variety of choices in Business and Management with different specialisations.

- Bangalore Yeshwanthpur Campus

The university opened its campus in Yeshwanthpur in July 2022, which started functioning from August 2022. The campus is 10 stories tall and spread over 1.6 million square feet of space.

- Delhi NCR Campus

This is the off-campus of the university Located in Sewa Nagar, Ghaziabad, Delhi NCR established in 2013. The campus is located near to Shaheed Sthal metro station of Delhi Metro and spread over 5 acres.

- Pune Lavasa Campus

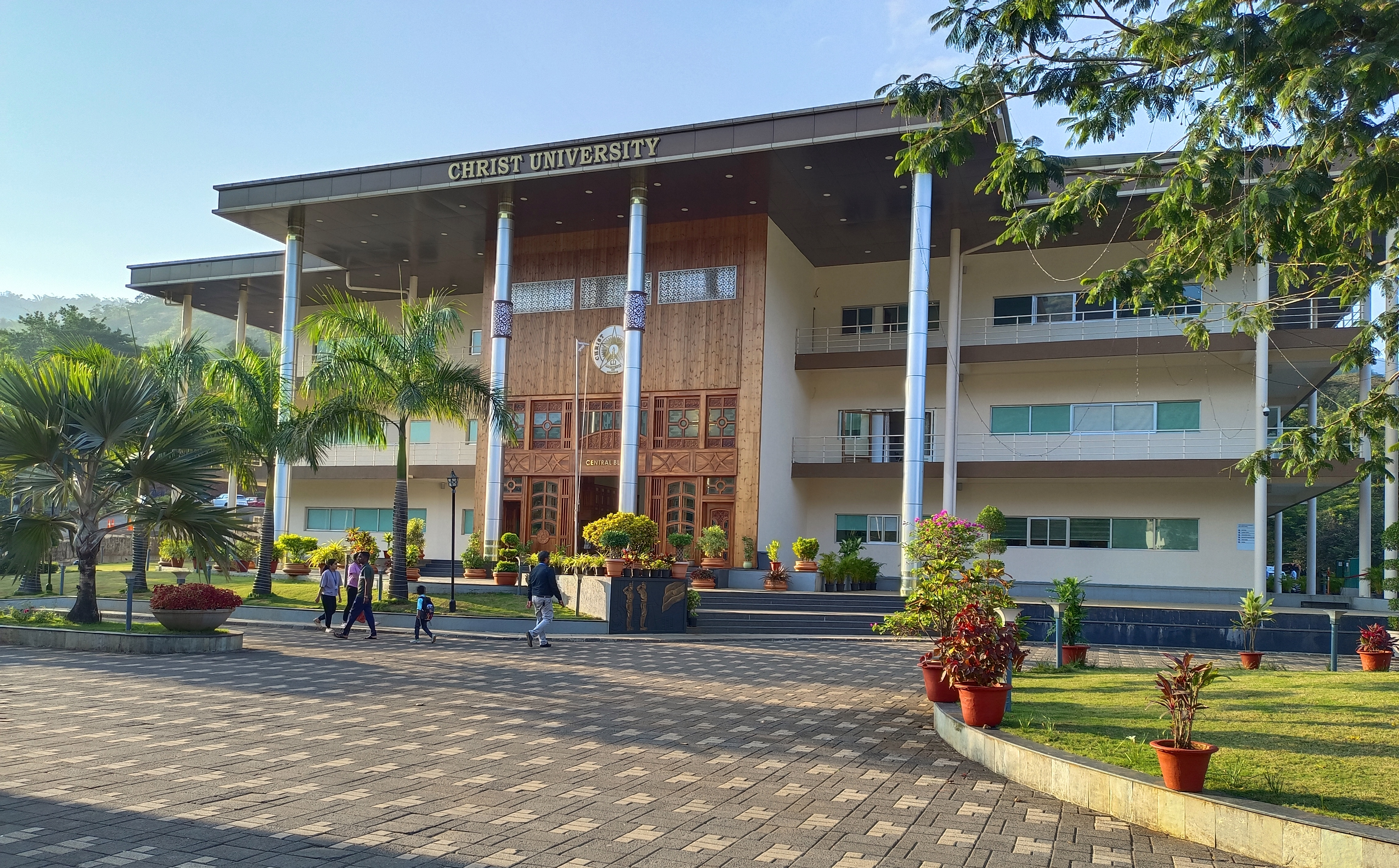
CHRIST (Deemed to be University) Pune Lavasa Campus

The Pune Lavasa Campus, also known as the Analytical hub of the university, located within the Sahyadri mountain range in Lavasa, Pune which was established in 2014, the Campus is spread over 28 acres.

== Organization and Administration ==
The university is managed by the CHRIST University Society, which in turn is organized by the CMI congregation, under the Syro Malabar Major Archiepiscopal Church. The Rector of the Pontifical Athenaeum Dharmaram Vidya Kshetram is the de-facto Chancellor of the university. The present chancellor is Dr. Fr. Saju Chackalackal and vice chancellor is Dr. Fr. Joseph C C, both CMI priests.

== Academics ==
The university has over 30,000 students and more than 1200 faculty members across all campuses. It has a foreign student community of about 700 from 58 nationalities. The university offers nationally and internationally recognised undergraduate, postgraduate and research programmes.

=== Academic programmes ===
==== Undergraduate programmes ====
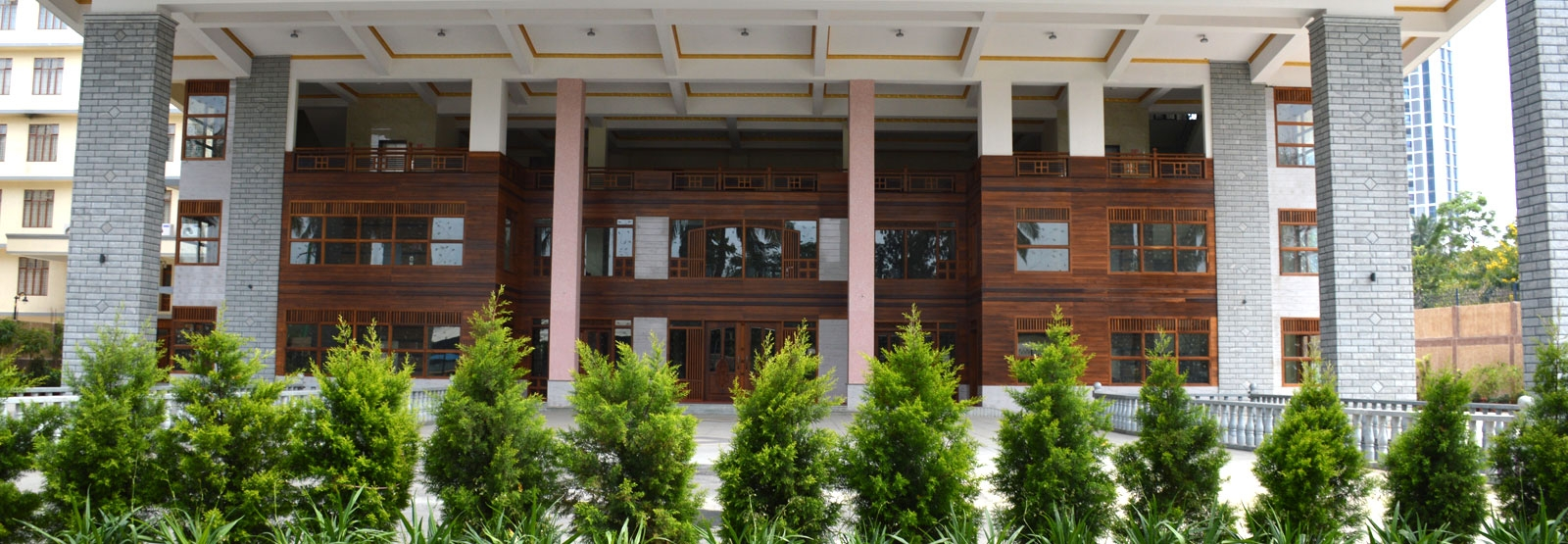
BGR Campus Front view

The university offers over 50 undergraduate programmes in humanities, social sciences, science, commerce and management, education, law and engineering. Undergraduate programmes are of three-year duration except in the case of Bachelor of Education (BEd, two years), Bachelor of Hotel Management (BHM, four years), Bachelor of Laws (LLB, five years), Bachelor of Technology (BTech, four years) and an integrated BTech/MTech or MBA (five years). Except for Bachelor of Business Administration (BBA), Bachelor of Commerce (BCom), Bachelor of Arts (BA) and Bachelor of Science (BSc) programmes follow a Triple Major system.

Wikipedia in the undergraduate programme

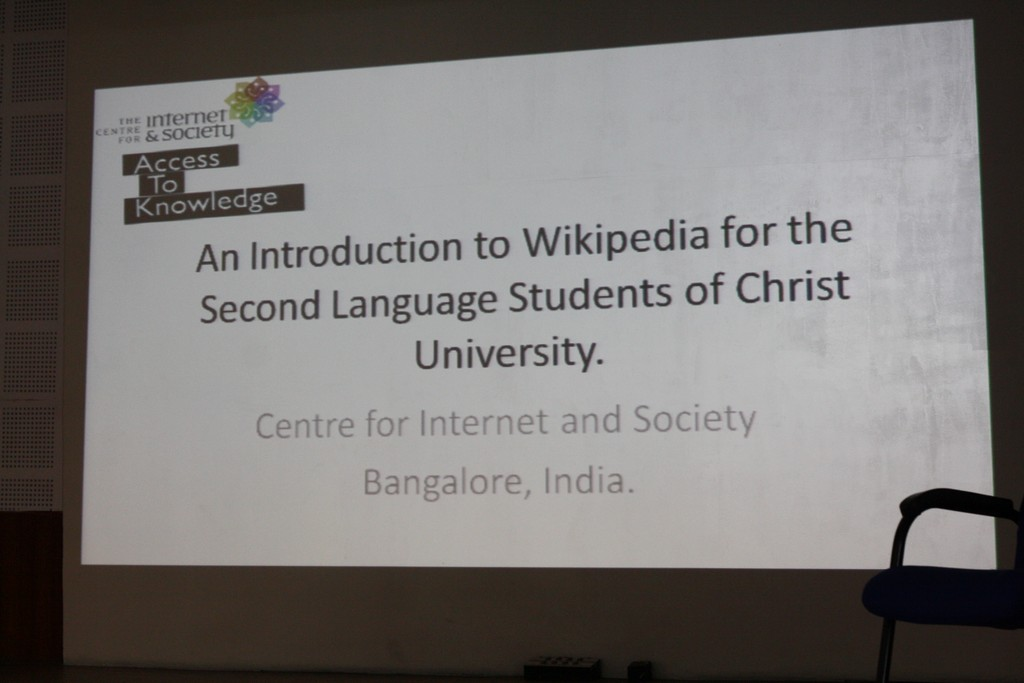
Wikipedia workshop for second language students

The institution entered into a memorandum of understanding with the Centre for Internet and Society, Bangalore to make article writing on Wikipedia a core exercise for the continuous internal assessment of its 1600 undergraduate students in Hindi, Kannada, Tamil, Sanskrit and Urdu. The Hindi and Kannada articles may be found at collection of Hindi articles and collection of Kannada articles.

=== Rankings ===
In 2025, Christ University was ranked 63rd among all universities in India by NIRF.

=== Membership ===
The university is a member of the Association of Indian Universities, International Federation of Catholic Universities (IFCU) and Association to Advance Collegiate Schools of Business (AACSB).

== Notable alumni ==
Name	Field of notability	Notes
Anjana Menon	Malayalam film actress	
Ankur Betageri	poet, fiction writer, art activist	
Anne Amie	Playback singer and voiceover artist	Kerala State Film Award for Best Singer 2023
Annu Antony	Malayalam film actress	Debuted in Aanandam
Apurva Kasaravalli	Kannada Film Director	
Arvind Venugopal	Playback singer in Malayalam Film Industry	
Chandy Oommen	Member of Legislative Assembly	Chairman of the National Outreach Cell, Indian Youth Congress
Francis George	Member of Parliament	represented the Idukki Constituency, Deputy Chairman of Kerala Congress
Gautham Karthik	Tamil film actor	
Gokul Suresh	Malayalam Film Actor	
Gouri G. Kishan	Malayalam film actress	
Jahnavi Kamath	film actress	
Jobin Jose		
K M Chaitanya	Kannada film maker, theatre director	
Krishna Byre Gowda	Minister for Revenue, Government of Karnataka	President, Karnataka Youth Congress
Leona Lishoy	Indian film actress and model	
M. N. Reddi	senior officer in the Indian Police Service	
Madhukeshwar Desai	CEO, Mumbai Centre for International Arbitration (MCIA)	National Vice President of the Bharatiya Janata Yuva Morcha
Madonna Sebastian	Malayalam film actress	debut in the Malayalam film Premam
Meghana Raj	South Indian actress	
Nanditha Shwetha	Kannada actress and South Indian model	
Nicole Faria	Miss Earth 2010	
Nidhhi Agerwal	Bollywood and Telugu actress,	Yamaha Fascino Miss Diva 2014 finalist
Pearle Maaney	actress and model	D 4 dance anchor
Pradeep Hegde	Wildlife Filmmaker	
Prateik Jain	Model	
Priya Vadlamani	Model and Telugu Film Actress	
Raja Krishna Menon	film writer, director and producer	
Rajeev Ravindranathan	Actor and Comedian	
Reba Monica John	South Indian actress	debuted in the movie Jacobinte Swargarajyam
Rima Kallingal	Malayalam film actress	
Roysten Abel	Indian theatre director and playwright	
Sabbah Haji	Director of Haji Public School	
Sabu Varkey	Indian Hockey Team Member	
Samyukta Hornad	Kannada film actress	
Shilpi Neha Tirkey	Youngest MLA from Jharkhand	
Shwetha Srivatsav	Kannada Film Actress	
Sruthi Hariharan	South Indian Actress	Debuted in the movie Cinema Company
Supriya Lohith	Playback singer	She has over 500 films songs to her credit
Vijay Suriya	actor	
Vineeth Vincent	Beatboxer	

== See also ==
- Christ College, Irinjalakuda
- List of deemed universities
- Dharmaram College
- Bangalore
