= Dharmaram College =

Seminary in Bangalore, India

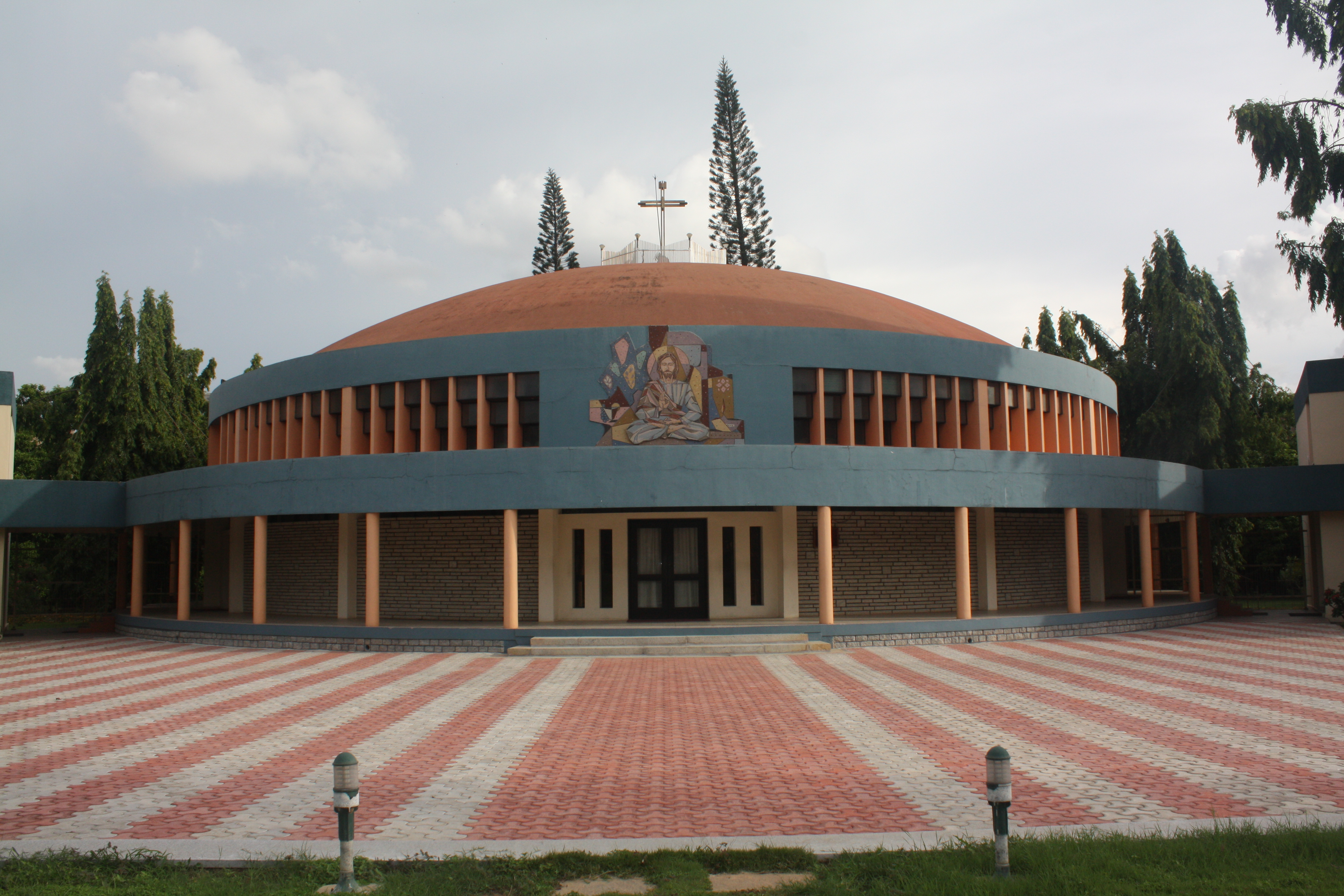
- Other name: Carmelites of Mary Immaculate
- Motto: Isha Bhakti Paramjnanam
- Motto in English: "Devotion to Lord is Supreme Wisdom"
- Type: CMI Seminary; Constituent college of Pontifical Athenaeum Dharmaram Vidya Kshetram
- Established: 1833 at Mannanam, Kerala (193 years ago); 1918 re-founded at Chethipuzha (108 years ago); 21 June 1957 relocated to Bangalore (69 years ago)
- Affiliations: Syro-Malabar Catholic Church; Carmelites of Mary Immaculate
- Academic affiliations: Pontifical Athenaeum Dharmaram Vidya Kshetram
- Rector: Rev. Fr. Varghese Vithayathil CMI
- Location: Bangalore, India; 12°56′10.8″N 77°36′10.5″E
- Website: dharmaram.in

Dharmaram College is a major seminary of the Carmelites of Mary Immaculate congregation and constituent college of Dharmaram Vidya Kshetram. It was started in 1833 at Chethipuzha, Kerala and relocated to Bangalore, India in 1957. The name Dharmaram is a portmanteau of the Sanskrit words dharma (understood in this context as "virtue") and arām (garden), to mean "garden of virtue." The name "garden of virtue" refers to the Sacred Heart of Jesus, a devotional title of Jesus under which the university is consecrated. "Isabhakti Paramjnanam," "Love of God is the Supreme Wisdom" is the motto of Dharmaram.

The aim of Dharmaram is to form holistically, spiritually, intellectually and culturally future generation priests who are prepared to commit themselves to the service of the Church and the world.

== Pontifical Athenaeum Dharmaram Vidya Kshetram ==
Pontifical Athenaeum Dharmaram Vidya Kshetram (DVK) is an ecclesiastical research university of higher learning established by the Dicastery for Culture and Education, Vatican. In the year 1965, it became affiliated to the Pontifical Gregorian University in Rome, and was later established as a Pontifical Athenaeum by charter from Vatican, under the direction of the Congregation for Catholic Education, and is empowered to award academic degrees up to PhD in Philosophy and Theology, and Licentiate in Philosophy, Theology, Canon Law, and Formative Spirituality and Counselling.

== See also ==
- Dharmaram Vidya Kshetram
