= Joseph Kallarangatt =

Indian Catholic bishop (born 1956)

Mar Joseph Kallarangatt
- Bishop of Palai
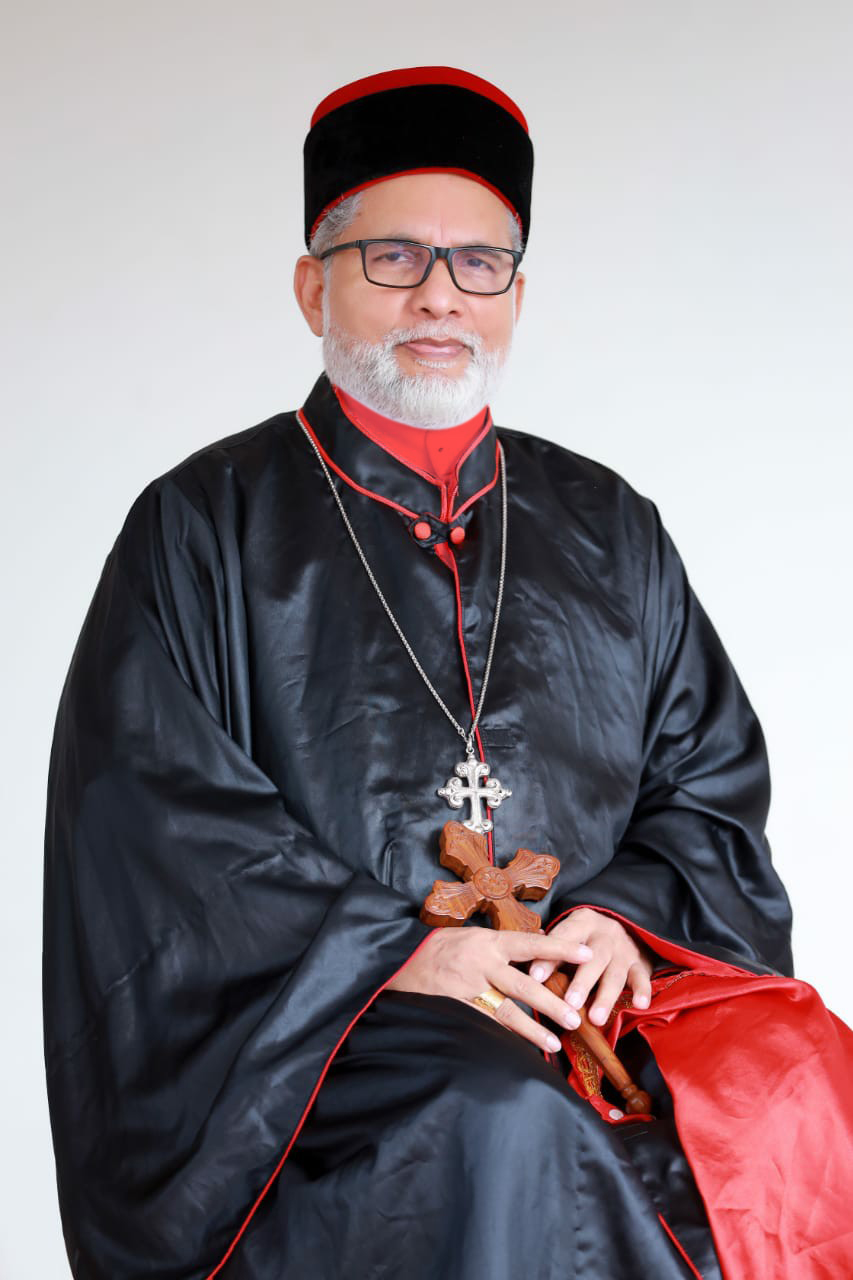
- Church: Syro-Malabar Catholic Church
- See: Eparchy of Palai
- Appointed: 18 March 2004
- Predecessor: Joseph Pallikaparampil
- Other posts: Chairman of Syro-Malabar Synodal Commission for Family, Laity and Life

Orders
- Ordination: 2 January 1982
- Consecration: 2 May 2004 by Joseph Powathil, Varkey Vithayathil, and Joseph Pallikaparampil

Personal details
- Born: 27 January 1956 (age 70) Kayyoor, Kottayam District, Kerala, India
- Education: Gregorian University, Rome

Joseph Kallarangatt (born 27 January 1956) is an Indian bishop of the Syro-Malabar Catholic Church serving as the Bishop of the Eparchy of Palai since 2004 succeeding Joseph Pallikaparampil.

Prior to Kallarangatt's ascent as bishop, he served in various roles in the Eparchy as well as in the Seminary including as the President of the Paurastya Vidyapitam in Vadavathoor. After his installation as Bishop, He serves as a Substitute Member of the Syro-Malabar Church's Permanent Synod and was the head of the church's doctrinal commission.

== Early life and career ==
Joseph Kallarangatt was born on 27 January 1956, in Kayyoor located in the Kottayam district of Kerala. He received his education at a Catholic seminary in Palai and became an ordained priest on 2 January 1982. Kallarangatt was an assistant parish priest at the Aruvithura and Ramapuram parishes until he was sent to the Gregorian University in Rome, Italy in 1984, from where he attained a doctorate in theology (ThD). Following his ThD, he became a teacher at a seminary in Vadavathoor and later the president of the Pontifical Oriental Institute of Religious Studies (Paurastya Vidyapitam), a theology institution of the Syro-Malabar Catholic Church.

== Pastoral ministry ==
=== Episcopacy ===
On 18 March 2004, Kallarangatt was appointed as the 3rd Bishop of the Syro-Malabar Catholic Eparchy of Palai, succeeding Joseph Pallikaparambil. His episcopal consecration occurred on 2 May 2004 conducted by Archbishop of Changanacherry Joseph Powathil and his enthronement was conducted by Major Archbishop Varkey Vithayathil. The diocese (eparchy) of Palai has the largest concentration of Syro-Malabar Catholics in Kerala.

The 31st plenary meeting of the CBCI was held at Alphonsian Pastoral Institute Pala from 5 to 12 February 2014 under the patronage of Joseph Kallarangatt as the local host.

Kallarangatt acted as the co-consecrator of Joseph Srampickal as the first bishop of the newly founded Syro-Malabar eparchy of Great Britain. The 2016 ceremony was led by Major Archbishop George Alencherry in Preston, United Kingdom. Srampickal, a priest from Palai was appointed by Pope Francis as the bishop-elect to the newly founded diocese of the Syro-Malabar Church in the United Kingdom. He assisted in the 2017 consecration of Thomas Tharayil as the auxiliary bishop to the Syro-Malabar Catholic Archeparchy of Changanacherry led by the Archbishop of Changanacherry, Joseph Perumthottam.

=== Theological and doctrinal stance ===
In early 2018, Kallarangatt headed a doctrinal committee of the church, which produced a report concluding that the religious interpretation of yoga was incompatible with Christian beliefs. The report stated that yoga could be practised for health benefits but to interpret results from it as spiritual benefits had far reaching and dangerous consequences.

Rite of Renewal of the Holy Malka officiated by Joseph Kallarangatt

He is one of the prominent bishops who is staunch adherent to the traditions, liturgical and ritual peculiarities of the Syro-Malabar Church. He is an expert in Syriac language and theology and is known to be the only Syro-Malabar bishop who is capable of celebrating the Holy Qurbana in Syriac.

=== Controversies ===
In early September 2018, a Catholic nun lodged a complaint against the then incumbent Bishop of Jalandhar Franco Mulakkal, accusing him of rape. Five of her fellow nuns of her congregation, the Missionaries of Jesus, began protests over inaction, saying that her repeated complaints to various authorities in the church hierarchy since 2017 had elicited no response. Bishop Kallarangatt was allegedly one of the first church authorities she had confided to back in June 2017. During the police investigation, he was brought in for questioning and he stated that the nun had only made a verbal complaint with him that the "atmosphere in the convent was not pleasant and that she was under stress". In response he advised her to inform the heads of her church. Mulakkal was later arrested in September 2018 and the Palai diocese extended its support for him. In January 2022, Mulakkal was acquitted of all charges related to the case."

In July 2021, as part of the "Year of the Family" celebrations, the Palai diocese devised a welfare scheme seeking to increase birth rates among Catholic women by offering financial assistance of ₹1,500 per month, admissions with scholarships at the church-run St. Joseph's College of Engineering and Technology, Palai and free medical facilities for every child born after the 4th child of couples married post 2000. The announcement of the scheme by Kallarangatt caused controversy but he defended it, stating that he stood by the scheme and that it was announced to support large families facing financial difficulties due to the COVID-19 pandemic. He further stated that they would begin taking applications and will be able to provide benefits from August onwards. Critics from within the Syro-Malabar community and elsewhere described it as an unethical and immoral scheme created for petty political gains and as interference in the sexual lives of married couples by unmarried clergy. The scheme of the Palai Bishop was followed by an announcement from the Church that extended free of cost neonatal care to women giving birth to their fourth child in Church run hospitals, and scholarships for the fourth and subsequent children of families who get admitted at Church run engineering colleges.

==== 2021 Love and narcotics jihad controversy ====
On 8 September 2021, Kallarangatt sparked a major controversy during a sermon at Kuravilangad Church, when he claimed that "love jihad" was real and that there was also a "narcotics jihad" targeting youths by radicals as a means of indirect war to annihilate the non-Muslim population. He described "narcotics jihad" as being present in places such as ice cream parlours, juice corners, rave parties, and hotels. Kallarangatt claimed these places led to youths becoming trapped into drug addiction. The remarks attracted immediate, widespread commentary and mixed reception, even from within the Christian community.

Representatives and members of the non-Catholic Christian churches were more vocal in their opposition, though there were also some disapproving responses from the Syro-Malankara Catholic Church and the Latin Church in India. Metropolitan Theodosius Mar Thoma, the head of the Mar Thoma Syrian Church, openly derided Kallarangatt for attempting to aggravate communal divisions in Kerala. Bishop Yuhanon Meletius of the Malankara Orthodox Syrian Church and Bishop Coorilose Geevarghese of the Malankara Jacobite Syrian Orthodox Church, both part of Oriental Orthodoxy also expressed the strongest condemnations stating that Kallarangatt had fallen into the design of the Sangh Parivar and was creating divisions among minorities with conspiracy theories at a time of growing fascism in India which threatened all of them.

From within the Syro-Malabar Church, the former spokesman of the synod, Paul Thelakkat and Senior Nun Teena Jose slammed Kallarangatt on account of his controversial statement, alleging that the controversy was purposefully orchestrated to distract from the sexual assault and corruption allegations surrounding the church's top leadership and created to forge an alliance with the Sangh Parivar in exchange for warding off investigations from agencies of the Narendra Modi government. The protesting nuns held a walkout protest, during a Holy Qurbana in Kuravilangad, against hate speech by Kallarangatt, after the parish priest reportedly endorsed him and called for "economic boycott of Muslims". Certain Catholic reformative organisations including the Joint Christian Council (JCC) and the Kerala Catholic Reformation Movement (KCRM) as well as the Social Democratic Party of India (SDPI) criticised Kallarangatt on similar lines.

Muslim organisations condemned the statements expressing that such remarks coming from a bishop was unprecedented; criticisms of his statement were made that described it as promoting prejudice against Muslims among Christians and involved varied demands for retraction, apologies, evidence and clarifications. Some of them organised a protest march in Palai to the Bishop's House demanding legal action against him, it saw the participation of 200 people. It led to a counter protest by supporters of the bishop along with the involvement of several local politicians. Both the marches were broken off by the police and participants charged for violation of COVID-19 protocols. The JCC stated that the two clashing protest marches could have led to a riot, and held a protest of their own demanded Kallarangatt to release an apology and raised concerns that the "Changanacherry lobby" was hijacking the church. The right-wing Bharatiya Janata Party extended its full support to the bishop and its several senior state functionaries visited him at his residence after the protests.

The Pala diocese issued a clarification stating that the bishop did not imply that all Muslims were doing so but only a small minority of extremists who were true believers. The same message was reiterated in communications from the KCBC and Archbishop Perumthottam. The chairman of the Kerala Congress (M), a member party of the Left Democratic Front, the communist led ruling coalition in Kerala also extended his support, criticising opponents of the bishop and accusing them of misrepresenting the bishop's statement.

Joseph Perumthottam, the Archbishop of Changanacherry, endorsed Kallarangatt through an article in the church-controlled newspaper Deepika. The Syro-Malabar Church issued a statement through its Public Affairs Commission offering their support to the Kallarangatt when this issue became controversial. The statement affirmed that the Kallarangatt's homily reflected the official position of the Syro-Malabar Church on the issue. The statement went on to say that the term 'Narco Jihad' was used in 2017 in a paper published by the European Foundation for South Asian Studies on the drug trade in Afghanistan by providing evidence for the drug business done by terrorist organisations. Moreover, the Kerala Catholic Bishops' Council (KCBC), representing all Catholic bishops in Kerala, has been discussing concerns about "love jihad" for several years. Following the controversy, the KCBC released a statement supporting Bishop Kallarangatt and other bishops who endorsed him. The statement affirmed that Kallarangatt's homily reflected the official position of the Syro-Malabar Church on the matter in Kerala.

Pinarayi Vijayan, the Chief Minister of Kerala and a leader of the left-wing Communist Party of India (Marxist), stated that it was the first time he was hearing about such a thing as "narcotics jihad" and that Kallarangatt being an influential and learned man should think before speaking and remember his civil obligation of not creating divisions in society, an obligation which all religious leaders have. In addition, he stated drug trafficking and consumption of narcotics were are a serious criminal and social issue respectively but could not be tied to religious affiliations, and that allegations of "narcotics jihad" and "love jihad" were delusional with no evidential support, citing data on interfaith marriages and on suspects and convicts in narcotics cases whose affiliations did not have any unusual ratios and reflected the general distribution of religious identities in the population of the state. Responding to demands of legal action, he stated that the government will not initiate any as the bishop was within his rights to address his sermon's attendees and because he did not intend to cause any communal enmity.

A case was registered against Kallarangatt by the Kerala Police in November 2021 over his remarks.
