= St. Thomas Church, Arunoottimangalam =

- Malakayatta palli
- Location within Kerala Location within India
- 9.7963°N 76.4976°E
- Location: Arunoottimangalam, Kottayam district, Kerala
- Address: Kaduthuruthy-Peruva Road, Arunoottimangalam, Kerala 686 604
- Country: India
- Denomination: Syro-Malabar Catholic Church
- Website: malakayattapally.com

History
- Status: Parish church
- Founded: 1912; 114 years ago
- Dedication: St. Thomas
- Events: Celebrates Way of the Cross since 1920 during Lent season

Architecture
- Functional status: Active

Administration
- District: Kottayam
- Archdiocese: Eparchy of Palai
- Parish: Arunoottimangalam Parish

Clergy
- Bishop: Mar Joseph Kallarangatt
- Vicar: Fr. Varickamakal Augustine

St. Thomas Catholic Church, Arunoottimangalam is a Parish church in the Palai Eparchy in Kottayam district of Kerala. The church is also called in Malayalam as Malakayatta palli meaning 'Church with the hill climbing way'. The parishioners in the past belonged to Kaduthuruthy church and Reverend Father Mathai kathanar Chempalayil started the Way of The Cross ceremony on the hill located behind the current church. Eventually the church was built at this place.

The Way of the Cross has been conducted since 1920 on every 40th day i.e Friday of the Roman Catholic Lent season which is 50 days. A Holy Relic from the Cross of Passion of Christ was brought to this church from Rome and since then devotees has been granted innumerable favours. The belief is that no prayer request made here goes unanswered. This is evident seeing the number of pilgrims visiting and praying in this church.

Every year the Thursday and Friday before the Good Friday of the Holy week is celebrated here pompously with mass and Way of The Cross prayers throughout these 2 days.

In 2024, the priest is Father Varickamakal Augustine.

== See also ==
- Roman Catholicism in India
