= Mammood =

Mammood Mammoodu
- town
- Location in Kerala, India Mammood (India)
- Coordinates: 9°30′0″N 76°38′0″E
- Country: India
- State: Kerala
- District: Kottayam

Languages
  - Official: Malayalam, English
- Time zone: UTC+5:30 (IST)
- Postal code: 686536
- Telephone code: +91481
- Vehicle registration: KL-5, KL-33
- Nearest city: Changanacherry
- Climate: Monsoon (Köppen)

Mammood is a small village in Kottayam district of Kerala state in India. Mammood falls under Madapally Panchayat and Chanaganacherry Thaluk. The village is situated about 10 km away from Changanacherry town. Changanacherry-Vazhoor Road passes through this village. Around 25,000 people lives here. The greenish landscape includes rubber plantations, paddy fields, coconut trees, pepper, mango trees, coca, and a wide variety of plants and trees.

== Recreation Center ==
Forward Social Club & Reading Room, Mammood.

== Transportation ==
Railway Station: Changanassery, 8.3 km away from Mammood

Post Office: Mammood

== Schools ==
School : St. Shantals School, St Sebastian School, C. M. S. L. P. S. Mammood, Established on 1847, S. A. L. P. S. Mammood.

Mother theresa public school mammood

== Nearest Towns/Villages ==
- Thengana
- Thottakadu
- Changanacherry
- Perumpanachy
- Karukachal
- Vakathanam
- Kurumpanadam
- Thrikkodithanam

== Nearest Small Towns/Villages ==
- Kochu Road
- Palamattom
- Nadakkappadom
- Mannila
- Santhipuram
- Madappally
- Venkotta
- Daivampady
- Chennamattom
- Chennamattom
- koothrapally

== Transportation ==
- Taxis/Autos
- Local Bus services from Changanassery (Private Bus Stand) and KSRTC (Changanassery) from all the above-mentioned nearest towns/villages
- Nearest Railway station is Changanacherry, about 10 km away or Tiruvalla about 14 km away.
