= Jacob Muricken =

Syro-Malabar Catholic Auxiliary Bishop of Palai

Mar Jacob Muricken ܡܵܪܝ ܝܲܥܩܘܿܒ݂ ܡܘܼܪܝܼܟܸܢ
- Auxiliary Bishop of Palai Emeritus
- Diocese: Syro-Malabar Catholic Eparchy of Palai
- See: Pala, Kerala

Orders
- Ordination: 27 December 1993
- Consecration: 1 October 2012

Personal details
- Born: Muttuchira, Kottayam District, Kerala, India
- Denomination: Syro-Malabar Catholic Church

Jacob Muricken (born 16 June 1963) is an Indian Catholic monk, prelate and theologian, who is the former auxiliary bishop of the Syro-Malabar Catholic Eparchy of Palai (2012–2022). He was ordained as a priest by Joseph Pallikaparampil on 27 December 1993. He served as an assistant vicar, boarding house rector, professor, secretary of Corporate Educational Agency, vicar at Chakkampuzha and Neeloor parishes. He was declared auxiliary bishop of Palai on 24 August 2012 while serving as the diocesan pastoral coordinator. His episcopal ordination was on 1 October 2012 by Joseph Perumthottam at St. Thomas Cathedral, Palai.

In August 2022 he resigned from his post as auxiliary bishop to become a hermit, moving to the hermitage following approval from the Syro-Malabar synod.

== Early life and career ==
Jacob Muricken was born at Muttuchira village in Kerala. After his collegiate studies at Deva Matha College, Kuravilangad from where he took a degree in economics and master's degree in economics from Government College Nattakom Kottayam and he joined Good Shepherd Minor Seminary, Palai. He did his ecclesiastical studies from St. Thomas Apostolic Seminary, Kottayam. He was ordained priest by then Bishop Mar Joseph Pallikaparampil on 27 December 1993 at his home parish Muttuchira. After a short period of service as assistant vicar at St. Mary's Forane Church Kuravilangad, he was appointed rector of Savio Home Boarding House, attached to St. Joseph's EMHS, Neeloor. Later he served the diocese in various capacities as professor at the diocesan minor seminary, secretary of Corporate Educational Agency, vicar at Chakkampuzha and Neeloor parishes.

He was declared auxiliary bishop of Diocese of Palai on 24 August 2012 while serving as the pastoral coordinator of the diocese. His episcopal ordination was on 1 October 2012 by Joseph Perumthottam at St. Thomas Cathedral, Palai.

In August 2022 The Synod of Syro-Malabar Bishops approved Muricken's request to leave the post as auxiliary bishop of Palai to live as a hermit while retaining his title of bishop.

Muricken donated his kidney to a youth who had a kidney malfunction.
