= A. M. Babu =

Indian judge

Hon'ble Justice A. M. Babu

Judge Kerala High Court
- In office 5 October 2016 – 26 October 2019
- Nominated by: T. S. Thakur
- Appointed by: Pranab Mukherjee

Personal details
- Born: 26 October 1957 (age 68) Kanjirappally, Kottayam
- Citizenship: Indian
- Education: St. Berchmans College
- Website: High Court of Kerala

Aettupanku Mohammedkhan Babu (born 26 October 1957) is a retired judge of the Kerala High Court. The High Court of Kerala is the highest court in the Indian state of Kerala and in the Union Territory of Lakshadweep. It is headquartered at Ernakulam, Kochi

== Early life and education ==
Babu was born at Kanjirappally, Kottayam, Kerala in 1957. Completed his schooling from St.Thomas High School, Keezhillam. Graduated from St. Berchmans College, Changanassery and obtained a law degree from Udupi Law College, Udupi.

== Career ==
Babu enrolled as an Advocate in 1981. He joined Kerala Judicial Service as Munsiff in 1989, promoted as Sub-Judge in 1992 and as District Judge in 2002. Babu appointed as served as Additional Director, Kerala Judicial Academy, Kochi in 2010 and as Director on 12.04.2012. On 5 October 2016 he was appointed as additional judge of Kerala High Court, became permanent from 16 March 2018 and demitted his office upon attaining age of superannuation on 26 October 2019.
