= Vayalil =

Vayalil is a surname. Notable people with the surname include:

- Sebastian Vayalil (1906–1986), Indian bishop
- Shamsheer Vayalil (born 1977), Indian radiologist
