= Mathew Kavukattu =

Syro-Malabar Catholic archbishop (1904–1969)

Mar Mathew Kavukatt Saint
- First Metropolitan Archbishop of Changanassery
- Church: Syro-Malabar Catholic Church
- Installed: 3 January 1951
- Term ended: 9 October 1969
- Predecessor: James Kalacherry
- Successor: Antony Padiyara

Personal details
- Born: 17 July 1904 Pravithanam, Palai
- Died: 9 October 1969 (aged 65) Changanassery
- Education: St. Berchmans College

Kavukatt Mar Mathew Metropolitan (17 July 1904 – 9 October 1969) was the first Syro-Malabar Catholic Archbishop of the Archdiocese of Changanassery. He was appointed bishop in 1950, elevated as archbishop in 1956 and served as Metropolitan until his death. He was named a Servant of God in 1994.

He was patron of St Berchmans College from 1950 until his death. The College has an auditorium named after him.
