= St. Mary's Metropolitan Cathedral, Changanassery =

St. Mary's Syro-Malabar Metropolitan Cathedral
- Marth Mariyam Syro-Malabar Catholic Metropolitan Cathedral (Changanassery Methrasana Palli)
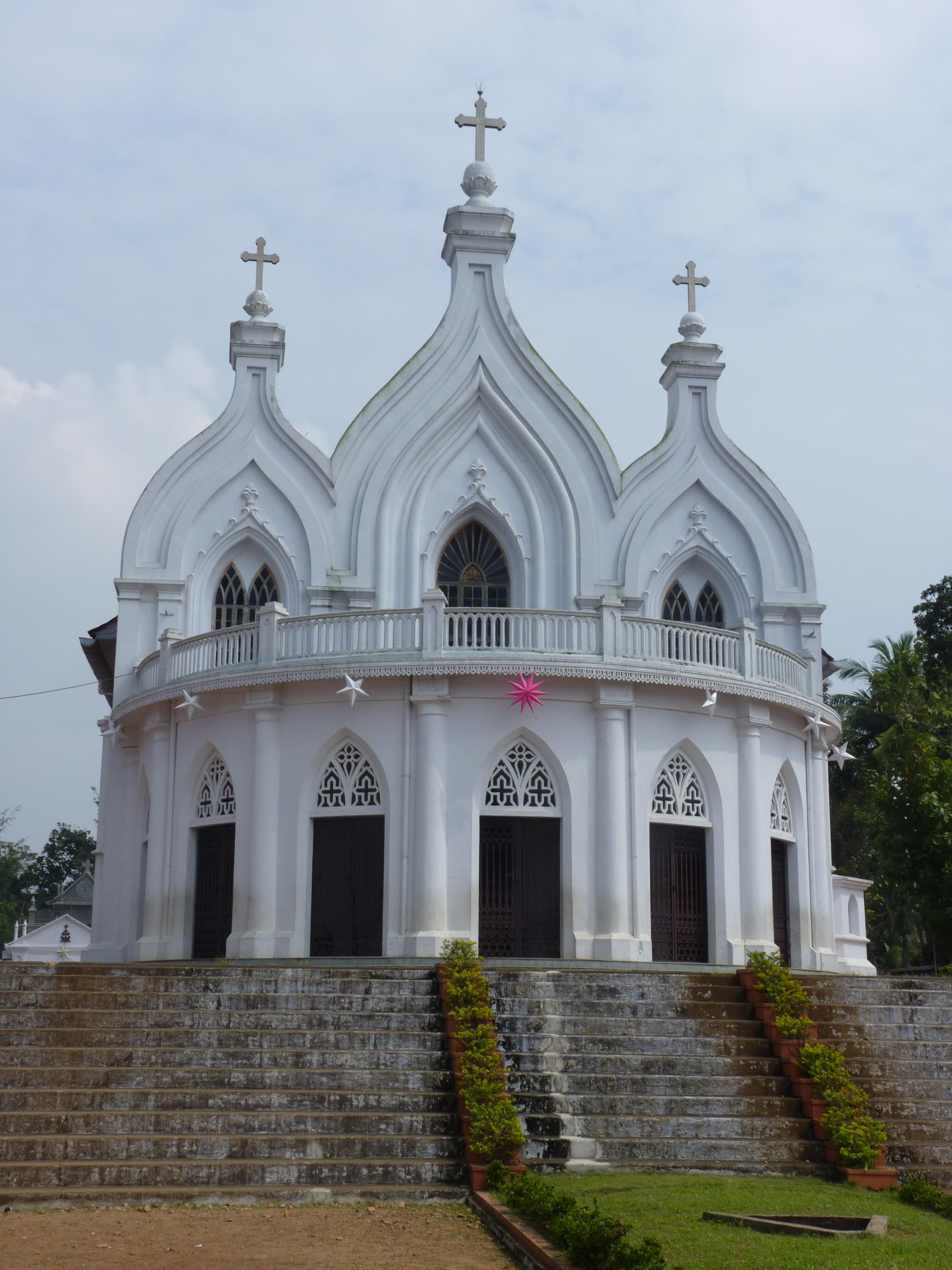
- Syro-Malabar Cathedral

- Location of the cathedral in Kerala
- 9.444141°N 76.536625°E
- Location: Changanassery
- Country: India
- Denomination: Syro-Malabar
- Website: metropolitanchurchchry.org

History
- Status: Cathedral
- Founded: 1177
- Consecrated: 1887

Architecture
- Functional status: active

Administration
- Diocese: Syro-Malabar Catholic Archeparchy of Changanassery

Clergy
- Bishop: Mar Thomas Tharayil

St. Mary's Syro Malabar Metropolitan Cathedral, also known as Valiyapally, is the cathedral of the Syro-Malabar Catholic Archeparchy of Changanassery (Archieparchia Changanacherrensis) and also a Marian pilgrimage centre in Kerala, India.

== History ==
The local Christian community in and around Changanachery inherits its faith directly from St. Thomas the Apostle, who formed a Christian community of faithful, centered on Niranam in the 1st century. The first church in Changanachery was established in 1177. The plot of land for the church was donated by the local Hindu king of Thekkumkoor. The current church is the fourth one in its place. The church was reconstructed and consecrated in 1887. The cathedral is ornamented with ancient Hindu temple carvings.
