= Eparchy of Palai =

Syro-Malabar Catholic territory in India

Eparchy of Palai ܐܦܪܟܝܐ ܕܦܠܝ
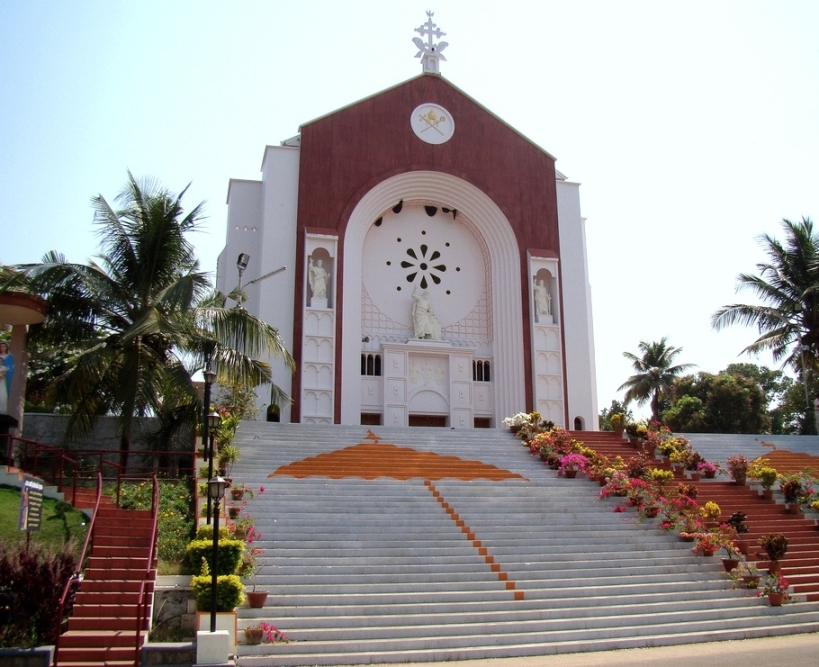

- Coat of arms

Location
- Country: India
- Ecclesiastical province: Metropolitan Province of Changanassery

Statistics
- Area: 1,166 km^{2} (450 sq mi)
- Population: Total; Catholics: (as of 2009); 695,000; 326,747 (47%)

Information
- Denomination: Catholic Church
- Sui iuris church: Syro-Malabar Catholic Church
- Established: 25 July 1950
- Cathedral: Cathedral of St Thomas in Palai
- Patron saint: Immaculate Conception; St Thomas the Apostle St. Alphonsa

Current leadership
- Pope: Leo XIV
- Major Archbishop: Mar Raphael Thattil
- Bishop: Mar Joseph Kallarangatt
- Metropolitan Archbishop: Mar Thomas Tharayil
- Bishops emeritus: Mar Joseph Pallikaparampil Bishop Emeritus (1981-2004); Mar Jacob Muricken auxiliary bishop emeritus(2012-2022)

Website
- www.palaidiocese.com

The Eparchy of Palai is a Syro-Malabar Catholic ecclesiastical jurisdiction or eparchy of the Catholic Church with an area of 1166 km^{2} comprising the Meenachil taluk and a few villages of the neighbouring taluks in Kottayam, Ernakulam, and Idukki districts of central Kerala in South India. The faithful of this eparchy, numbering 326,742, belong to the ancient St. Thomas Christian community. The seat of the bishop is the St. Thomas Cathedral based in the town of Palai. The current bishop is Mar Joseph Kallarangatt, serving since March 2004.

Pope Pius XII established the eparchy bifurcating then Eparchy of Changanacherry, and out of the territory covered by the then foranes of Palai, Muttuchira, Kuravilangad, Anakkallu and Ramapuram on 25 July 1950. Initially, the eparchy was erected as a suffragan of the Acheparchy of Ernakulam. The then apostolic nuncio to India, Archbishop Leo P. Kierkels, installed Sebastian Vayalil as the first bishop of the new eparchy. Eparchy of Changanacherry was elevated to the status of Archeparchy and constituted the new ecclesiastical province of Changanacherry on 22 August 1956. Thus, the eparchy of Palai became one of its suffragans.

Rite of Renewal of Holy Leaven (Malka) by Joseph Kallarangatt and Co Celebrant: Malpan Malpane Koonammackal Thoma Kathanar at Beth Aprem Nasrani Dayara at Kuravilangad

== History ==
Pope Pius XII, by the Bull "Quo Ecclesiarum", issued on 25 July 1950, bifurcated the eparchy of Changanacherry and out of the territory covered by the then Foranes of Palai, Muttuchira, Kuravilangad, Anakkallu, and Ramapuram erected the eparchy of Palai as a suffragan of the Archeparchy of Ernakulam. Leo P. Kierkels, the Apostolic Internuncio in India, published the Bull in the St. Thomas Cathedral Palai on 4 January 1951 and installed Sebastian Vayalil as the first bishop of the new eparchy. On 22 August 1956, when the Holy See by the Ap. Const. ‘Regnum Coelorum’ raised the eparchy of Changanacherry to the status of an archeparchy and constituted the new ecclesiastical province of Changanacherry, the eparchy of Palai became one of its suffragans.

Jacob Muricken was appointed as auxiliary bishop in 2012. In 2022, he received approval from Synod of Syro-Malabar Bishops to leave the position of auxiliary bishop and live as a hermit. Joseph Kallarangatt is the current and third bishop of the eparchy and has held this position since 2004. As the delegate of Syro-Malabar Synod, he attended XIV Ordinary General Assembly of the Synod of Bishops on Family held at Rome from 4-25 October 2015.

== Prelates ==
Bishops

Sl.no	Ordinary	Designation	Year of appointment	Last year of service
1	Sebastian Vayalil	Bishop	1950	1981
2	Joseph Pallikaparampil	Bishop	1981	2004
3	Joseph Kallarangatt	Bishop	2004	present

Auxilary Bishop

Sl.no	Ordinary	Designation	Year of appointment	Last year of service
1	Joseph Pallikaparampil	Auxiliary bishop	1973	1981
2	Jacob Muricken	Auxiliary bishop	2012	2022

Prelates Hailing from the Eparchy

Sl.no	Ordinary	Designation	Year of appointment	Last year of service
1	Joseph Srampickal	Bishop - Great Britain	2016	Present
2	Jacob Angadiath	Bishop - Chicago, USA	2001	2022
3	Joseph Kollamparambil	Auxiliary bishop - Shamshabad	2022	Present
4	Jose Sebastian Thekkumcherikunnel	Bishop - Jullundur	2025	Present

== Saints and causes for canonisation ==
- St. Alphonsa of the Immaculate Conception
- Blessed Thevarparampil Kunjachan (born Augustine)
- Venerable Mathew Kadalikkattil
- Servant of God Sr. Mariam Arampulickal (Mary Collette of the Infant Jesus)
- Paremmakkal Thoma Kathanar (1736–1799)
