= Joseph Perumthottam =

Indian Syro-Malabar Catholic prelate (b. 1948)

Mar Joseph Perumthottam ܡܪܝ ܝܘܣܦ ܦܝܪܘܡܬܘܬܡ
- Metropolitan Archbishop Emeritus of Changanacherry
- Church: Catholic Church; Syro-Malabar Church
- Archdiocese: Changanacherry
- Predecessor: Joseph Powathil
- Successor: Thomas Tharayil
- Other post: Chairman of the Syro-Malabar Synodal Commission for Ecumenical Relations

Personal details
- Born: 5 July 1948 (age 78) Kongandoor, Kottayam District, Kerala, India
- Residence: St. Joseph's Priests' Home, Ithithanam
- Education: St. Thomas Apostolic Seminary Vadavathoor, Gregorian University, Rome

Ordination history
History
Episcopal consecration
- Principal consecrator: Joseph Powathil
- Co-consecrators: George Valiamattam, Joseph Pallikaparampil
Episcopal succession
Bishops consecrated by Joseph Perumthottam as principal consecrator
- Jacob Muricken: 2012
- Jose Pulickal: 2016
- Thomas Joseph Tharayil: 2017

Mar Joseph Perumthottam (Syriac: ܡܪܝ ܝܘܣܦ ܦܝܪܘܡܬܘܬܡ, romanized: Mar Yawsep Perumthottam) (born 5 July 1948) is an Indian prelate of the Catholic Church. He was the Metropolitan Archbishop of the Syro-Malabar Catholic Archeparchy of Changanacherry, India.

== Education ==
He was educated in St. Joseph's High School in Punnathura and St. Berchmans College in Changanassery. He completed his seminary studies at St. Thomas Petit Seminary, Changanassery, and St. Thomas Apostolic Seminary, Vadavathoor, Kottayam.

On 18 December 1974 he was ordained priest by Archbishop Mar Joseph Powathil, then auxiliary Bishop of Changanacherry. After his ministry as assistant parish priest for a few years he was appointed in 1979 as Director of Sandesanilayam, the Catechetical Centre of the Archdiocese and Chaplain of Catholic Workers' Movement of the Archdiocese. In the Catechetical field, he introduced many training programmes, including Catechetical Leaders' Training (CLT), which is being continued to this day by Sandesanilayam.

In 1983 he was sent for higher studies, at Pontifical Gregorian University, Rome, where he took a doctorate in Church History. Back from Rome, in 1989 he was appointed professor of St. Thomas Apostolic Seminary Vadavathoor and Missionary Orientation Centre, Manganam, Kottayam and vicar of St. Sebastian's Church, Kodinattumkunnu. During this period he was instrumental in starting Marthoma Vidyanikethan at Changanacherry, the higher institute of religious sciences for the laity. This institute is affiliated to Paurastya Vidyapitam, Vadavthoor, conferring a P.G. degree recognized by the Congregation for Catholic Education, Rome, and Perumthottam has been at its helm for the last decade.

Simultaneously he has been vicar of Mar Sleeba Church, Ponga. He was nominated auxiliary bishop on 24 April 2002 and was consecrated by Archbishop Mar Joseph Powathil at St. Mary's Metropolitan Church, Changanacherry, on 20 May 2002, the 116th anniversary of the Archdiocese.

Perumthottam was appointed Archbishop of Changanassery on 22 January 2007, and assumed charge on 19 March 2007. Perumthottam retired on August 2024 and Thomas Tharayil is his successor.
