= Thomas Tharayil (archbishop of Changanassery) =

Syro-Malabar Catholic bishop (born 1972)

Mar Thomas Tharayil ܬܐܘܡܐ ܬܪܝܠ
- Metropolitan Archbishop of Changanacherry
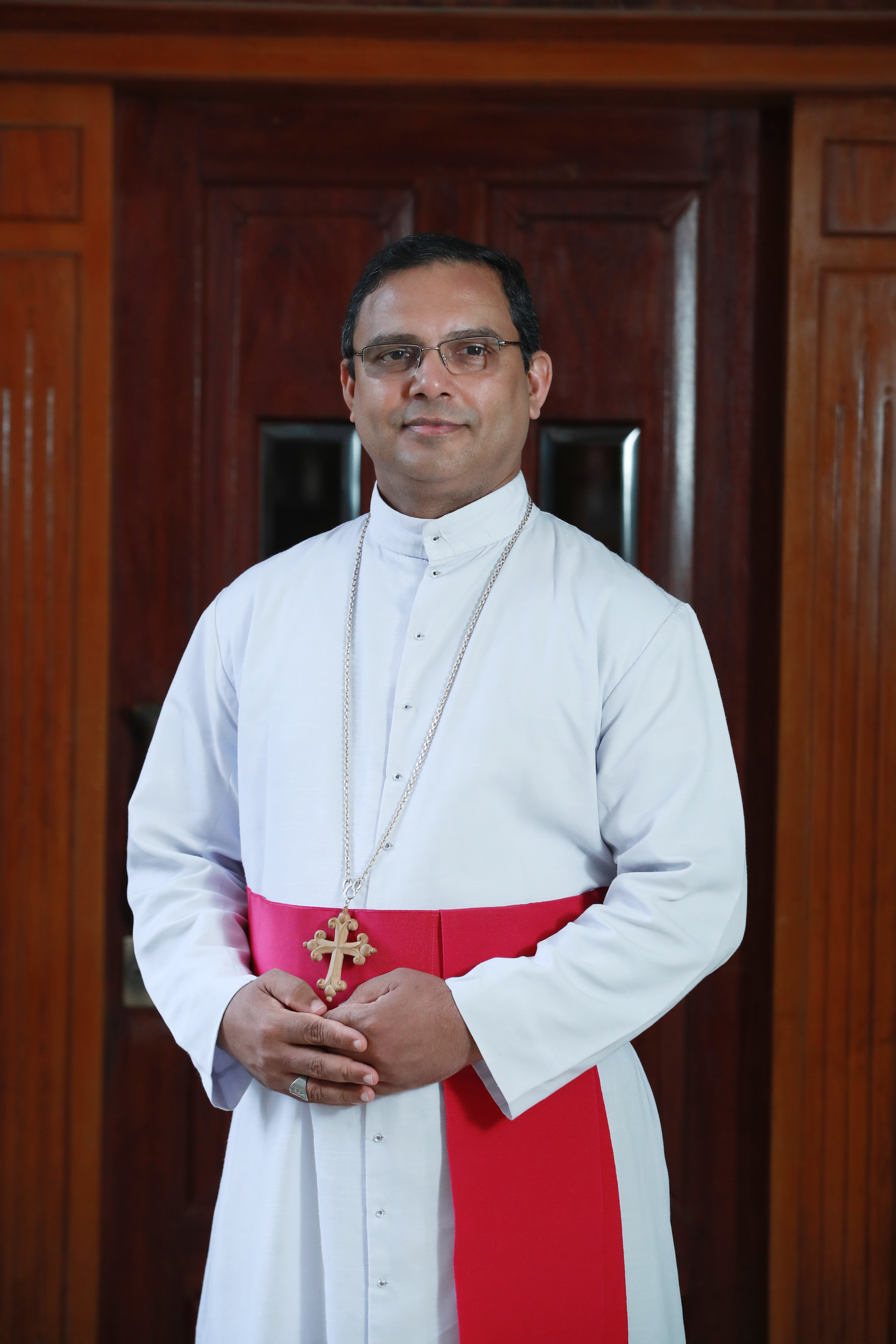
- Archdiocese: Syro-Malabar Catholic Archeparchy of Changanacherry
- Appointed: 30 August 2024
- Installed: 31 October 2024
- Predecessor: Joseph Perumthottam
- Other post: Chairman of the Syro-Malabar Commission for Media

Orders
- Ordination: 1 January 2000
- Consecration: 23 April 2017

Personal details
- Born: Tomy; 2 February 1972 (age 54) Changanacherry, Kottayam district, Kerala
- Denomination: Catholic Church
- Residence: Archbishop's House, Changanassery
- Parents: T.J.Joseph and Mariamma
- Education: SB College Changansserry; Pontifical Gregorian University

Styles of Mar Thomas Tharayil
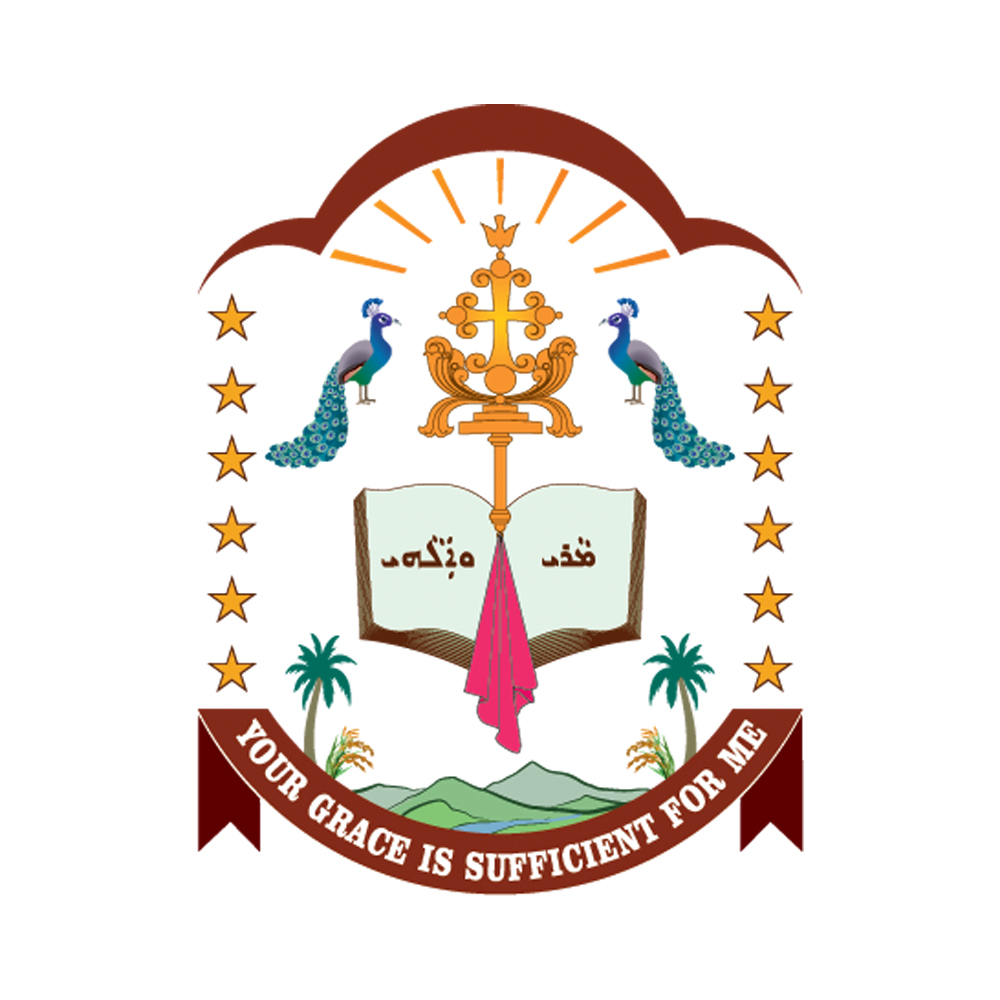
- Reference style: His Excellency
- Spoken style: Your Excellency
- Religious style: Mar

Mar Thomas Tharayil (born 2 February 1972) is the Metropolitan Archbishop of the Syro Malabar Archeparchy of Changanssery from 31 October 2024.

He was the auxiliary bishop of Syro-Malabar Archeparchy of Changanacherry from 23 April 2017 until his installation as archbishop.

On 30 August 2024, Raphael Thattil announced the election of Tharayil as the Archbishop of Changanacherry succeeding Joseph Perumthottam. He was enthroned as the Metropolitan of Archeparchy of Changanassery on 31 October 2024 in St Mary's Metropolitan Cathedral Church, Changanassery.

== Early life ==
Thomas Tharayil, born on 2 February 1972, is the youngest son among the seven children of T. J. Joseph and Mariamma at Changanacherry, Kottayam district, Kerala. He attended St Mary's Metropolitan Church, Changanacherry. He had his primary education in St Joseph's L. P. School, Changanassery, and his high school education at Sacred Heart English Medium School, Fathimapuram, completing his pre-degree course at St Berchmans College, Changanassery.

He joined the minor seminary of Changanacherry Archeparchy, St Thomas Minor Seminary, Kurichy, for priestly formation. He completed his philosophical and theological studies in St Thomas Apostolic Seminary, Vadavathoor. He was ordained priest by Joseph Powathil on 1 January 2000, the Great Jubilee Year, at St Mary's Metropolitan Church, Changanacherry.

== Priestly life ==
Tharayil was assistant vicar in Athirampuzha (2000), Nedumkunnam (2001) and Koilmuck-Edathua (2003). He served at Thazhathuvadakara as vicar in the year 2004.

He did doctoral studies in psychology from Pontifical Gregorian University (2004–2011). After his doctorate in Rome he was appointed as the Director of Dhanahalaya, Institute of Formation and Counselling, Punnapra, Alappuzha, in 2011. He was visiting professor to St Thomas Apostolic Seminary, Vadavathoor, National Vocation Service Centre, Pune and Dharmaram Vidya Kshetram and Institute of Formators, Bengaluru.

== Auxiliary bishop ==
The synod of bishops of the Syro-Malabar Church, held at Kakkanad Mount St Thomas, elected Fr Thomas Tharayil (Tomy) as auxiliary bishop of the Changanassery archdiocese on 14 January 2017. He was conferred as the auxiliary bishop by Mar Joseph Perumthottam on 23 April 2017. Pope Francis assigned to the Auxiliary Bishop-Elect the Titular See of Agrippia. The southern part of the Changanacherry Archeparchy consisting of Thiruvananthapuram, Kollam and Amboori Foranes is under the attention of Mar Thomas Tharayil.

On 20 October 2020 there was a hunger strike protest by three bishops of Catholic Church, Bishop Joshua Mar Ignathios of Mavelikkara, chairman of the Kerala Bishops' Council (KCBC) Education Commission, its vice-chairman, Bishop Paul Anthony Mullassery of Kollam and Auxiliary Bishop Thomas Tharayil of Changanassery, against the government for educational rights. Archbishop Soosa Pakiam said that in the last five years, the government has not distributed its promised aid to over 3,000 teachers in Catholic schools.

== Metropolitan Archbishop ==
On the Third Session of the Thirty-Second Synod of Bishops, Tharayil was elected Archbishop. On 30 August 2024, Raphael Thattil announced the election of Tharayil as the Metropolitan Archbishop of Changanacherry succeeding Mar Joseph Perumthottam. Tharayil was enthroned on 31 October 2024 at St. Mary's Metropolitan Cathedral, Changanassery (Vallya Palli).
