= Sebastian Vayalil =

Indian priest

Sebastian Emmanuel Vayalil
- Eparch of Palai
- Church: Syro-Malabar Church
- Diocese: Eparchy of Palai
- In office: 25 July 1950 – 6 February 1981
- Predecessor: Eparchy erected
- Successor: Joseph Pallikaparampil

Orders
- Ordination: 21 December 1935
- Consecration: 9 November 1950 by Eugène Tisserant

Personal details
- Born: 28 January 1906 Palai, Kingdom of Travancore, British Empire
- Died: 21 November 1986 (aged 80)

Bishop Sebastian Vayalil (28 January 1906 – 21 November 1986) was the first bishop of the Syro-Malabar Catholic Eparchy of Palai, in Kerala, India.

He was born at Palai, and took his B. A. Degree from the Maharaja's College, Trivandrum in 1928. He had his ecclesiastical studies at the St. Joseph's Ap. Seminary Mangalapuzha, Alwaye and was ordained priest on 21 December 1935. He took his L.T. Degree from the Training College Trivandrum in 1942. He was the Headmaster of St. Thomas Training School Palai, till he was appointed the Bishop of Palai, on 25 July 1950. He was consecrated Bishop by Eugene Cardinal Tisserent, Secretary of the Sacred Congregation for the Oriental Churches, on 9 November 1950 at St. Theresia's Church Rome and was installed in Palai Cathedral by the Most Rev. Leo. P. Kierkels, the Apostolic Internuncio, on 4 January 1951.

Bishop Vayalil was a member of the Preliminary Commission instituted for the Second Vatican Council to prepare the scheme for the section on 'Universities and Seminaries'. He attended all the four sessions of the council. Chicago's De Paul university conferred upon him in 1966 the honorary Degree of Doctor of Laws (L.L.D.) in recognition of his outstanding achievements as an educator. In 1969 he participated in the extra ordinary Synod of Bishops held in Rome.

After thirty years in charge of the diocese in 1980, he requested the Holy See to relieve him from the pastoral Government of the diocese. On the acceptance of his resignation he handed over the charge of the diocese to his successor Mar Joseph Pallikaparampil on 25 March 1981.

Bishop Sebastian Vayalil supported the Missions and promoted vocations. He founded the Missionary Society of St Thomas the Apostle in 1968 for organised missionary work in and outside India. He also co-founded the Daughters of St Thomas.
