= L. A. Ravi Varma =

Historian, ophthalmologist, philosopher from Kerala

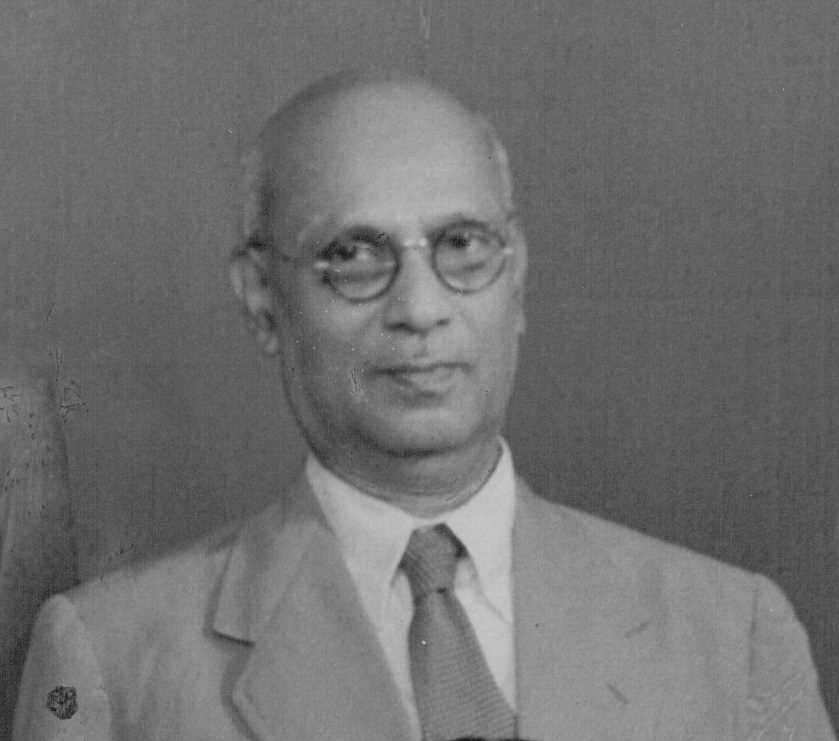
Dr. L. A. Ravi Varma

Dr. L. A. Ravi Varma (Lakshmipuram Avitomthirunal Ravi Varma), (26 October 1884 – 16 February 1958) was a historian, ophthalmologist and philosopher of the 20th century in Kerala, India. He was a critical figure who enriched the Ayurvedic literature contributing to its renaissance. In January 1940, he was appointed as Director of the joint Oriental Manuscripts Libraries of the Government of Kerala and the Kerala University. He was conferred the Honorary Title of Vaidyashastra Nipunan (authority in the Medical Sciences) by Chithira Thirunal Maharaja, the King of Travancore, Kerala, India, and Gaveshana Thillakan (crown Jewel among Researchers) by the Maharaja of Cochin, Kerala, India.

Varma was also the one of founding ophthalmologists and later the second superintendent of the first Government Ophthalmic Hospital in Thiruvananthapuram, Kerala that is known today as the Regional Institute of Ophthalmology. He was one of the early reformers of medicine in modern Kerala and one of the first scholars to create a semantic bridge between Western and Indian medical systems.

== Personal life ==
L. A. Ravi Varma was born on 26 October 1884 at the Lakshmipuram Palace, Changanassery, Kerala to Aryaamba Thampuratti (Bharani Nal Kunji Thampuratty) and Neelakanda Sharma (Namboothiri), of Thamaraserry Illam in Changanaserry. He was the great grand-nephew of Maharaja Swathi Thirunal of Travancore and the nephew of A. R. Raja Raja Varma. He had one elder brother and a younger brother.

== Education ==
Varma graduated from Madras Medical College, India, in 1911 with an MBCM (Bachelor of Medicine and Master of Surgery) degree. He specialized in Ophthalmology at the Moorfield Eye Hospital in London, where he received his DOMS in 1921. He was a Sanskrit and Malayalam scholar, who also trained in the science of Ayurveda as well as the practice of the Hindu rituals of Sri Vidya.

== Career ==
Dr. Varma practiced ophthalmology at the Ophthalmic Hospital in Trivandrum, Kerala from 1922 until 1940 and was its second superintendent. From 1940 to 1942, he was the Honorary Director of the Manuscripts Library, Trivandrum, Kerala, and the Director of the Ayurveda College in Trivandrum, Kerala from 1942 to 1948. He also served as The Master Mason in the Minchin 2710 Masonic Lodge in 1938.

He wrote and published numerous books and articles from 1939 until his death. A few of his contributions include: a scientific and analytical interpretation of the Bhagavad Gita, an exposition on the origin of Malayalam script and commentaries on the Upanishads. He was an authority on Shri Vidya rituals and Ayurveda. He exchanged many ideas and thoughts with Einstein, and translated parts of the Bhagavad Gita for him.

== Selected publications ==
Related to Vedanta, Purana & Ritualistic Worship:

Commentary on The Bhagavad Gita, Lalita Vyakhanam, in Malayalam, Publisher: B V Book Depot & Printing works, Trivandrum, Kerala, 1934.

Commentary on The Bhagavad Gita, Lalita Vyakhanam, English Translation, Publisher, Sri Sathya Sai Premamrutha Prakashana, 2025.

Commentaries on the Kena, Ishvasya and Katha Upanishads based on Sankara Bhashya

Vedanta (contd.), Mimaṃsa, and Vyakaraṇa, Book, English, Publisher: Trivandrum : V.V. Press Branch, 1939.

The Rksamhita, with the Bhashya of Skandaswamin and Dipika of Venkatamadhavarya, Sanskrit, Publisher: Trivandrum : University of Travancore, 1929-1942

Agniveśyagrhyasutra Hindu Rituals, Publisher: Trivandrum University of Travancore 1940

"Rituals of worship", The Cultural Heritage of India, Vol. 4, The Ramakrishna Mission Institute of Culture, Calcutta, 1956, pp. 445–463

Hindu Matha Praveshika: Introduction to Hinduism

Puraṇa (contd.) and Vedanta, Book, English. Publisher: Trivandrum : V.V. Press Branch, 1938.

Nyaya and Jyotiṣa, Book, English, Publisher: Trivandrum : V.V. Press Branch, 1939.

Jyotiṣa (contd.), Vaidyaka, and Mantra, Book, English, Publisher: Trivandrum : V.V. Press Branch, 1939.

Related to Language & Linguistics:

Pracina keraḷa lipikaḷ, Malayalam, Publisher: Trichur : Kerala Sahitya Akademi, 1971.

Arya Dravida Bhashakalude Paraspara Bandham, a study on the relationship between Aryan and Dravidian languages. Vijñamaṃ, Malayalam Encyclopedia, 1956

The Vakyapadiya : (3rd Kanda) with the commentary Prakirṇaprakaśa of Helaraja son of Bhutiraja, Sanskrit, Trivandrum : University of Travancore, 1942

Descriptive Catalogue of Sanskrit Manuscripts in the Curator's Office Library, Trivandrum / Published under the authority of the Govt. of H.H. the Maharajah of Travancore:

Related to Ayurveda:

Ayurvedic treatments of Kerala, by Ashtavaidyan Vayaskara N. S. Mooss. [Introduction by L. A. Ravi Varma.], Publisher: Kottayam : Vaidya Sarathy, 1946.

Sarira: applied anatomy and physiology according to Ayurveda with notes on embryology, Malayalam, Publisher: Travancore : Dept. of Ayurveda, 1947.

Sariram and Arogyamargangal

Alcoholism in Ayurveda

Related to Architecture:

The Vastuvidya: with the commentary Laghuvivrti of M. R. Ry. K. Mahadeva Śastri Avl

Tantra and Śilpa, Book, English, Publisher: Trivandrum : V.V. Press Branch, 1940. Veda, Śrauta, Smṛti and Puraṇa, Book, English, Publisher: Trivandrum : V.V. Press Branch, 1937.

Related to Literature and General Topics:

Castes of Malabar" in the Kerala Society Papers, [General Editor: T. K. Joseph] Series 9, 1932, alias Vol. II, 1997 reprint, Thiruvananthapuram, Gazetteers Dept., Govt. of Kerala, pp. 171 - 204.

The shadow play in Malabar

Kuvalayavali or Ratnapañcalika, Sanskrit Drama 14th Century, Publisher: Trivandrum: University of Travancore,1941

Raghaviya of Ramapanivada

Stuti, Niti, Chandas, Alankara, Sangitaśastra, and Kamaśastra, Book, English, Publisher: Trivandrum : V.V. Press Branch, 1940.

Kośa, Miscellany and supplement, Book, English, Publisher: Trivandrum : V.V. Press Branch, 1941.

Naṭaka, Campu and Akhyayika, Book, English, Publisher: Trivandrum : V.V. Press Branch, 1940.

Kavya, Book, Publisher: Trivandrum : V.V. Press Branch, 1941
