= St. Thomas Cathedral, Pala =

Church in Pala, India

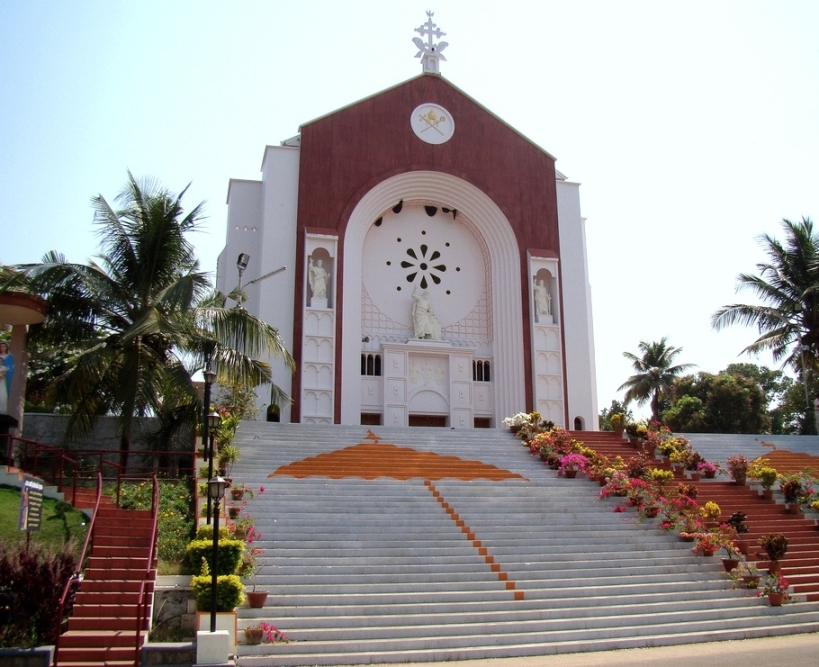
St. Thomas Cathedral, Pala

St Thomas Cathedral, also known as the Cathedral of Pala, is a Catholic church that follows the Syro-Malabar rite and is located in the town of Pala in the state of Kerala in the south of the Asian country of India. It serves as the mother church of the Syro-Malabar Diocese or Eparchy of Palai ( Eparchia Palaiensis) which was created in 1950 through the bull "Quo Ecclesiarum" of Pope Pius XII.

The church was founded in the year 1002 July 3, by four Syrian Christian families. These four Christian families of Palai were Tharayil, Koottumkal (brother of Tharayil Mappila), Erakonny and Vayalakombil. They engaged mainly in agriculture and trade. The traditional written history is that the Pala church founded by these families. Tharayil Thomman Mappila and Vayalakombil Thomman Mappila seek the permission to build a church at Pala. But the royal dynasty of the Meenachil Kartha (karthavu) asked them to bring two more families. Erakonni family joined with them And still they Were in need of one more family. So Tharayil mappila brought his own brother's son from kaduthuruthy to Pala and their family name turned as Koottumkal family, in order to construct the church. Meenachil Karthas gave land on the banks of meenachil river and the church was constructed. These four families stayed in and around the church and opposite to the church.

== Pala Old church (cheriya പള്ളി) ==
Bishop Joseph Srampickal baptizing a child at St. Thomas Cathedral old church, Pala.

The Old church was rebuilt three times and the present old church was reconstructed in 1702 by Srampickal Ittan Mappilai a member of Tharayil family. He was a chief trader and agriculturist of the land and by the last decade of the 17th century a mukalappada from Tamil Nadu set fire to the church. As the land where the old church stood was owned by Ittan Mappilai himself, he also had spent the expenses of reconstruction by himself. Records say when the construction of the church was completed, it also had left him in debt. According to his last wish Ittan Mappilai died lying on the Verandah of the church in 30 November 1702, and was buried in the church cemetery.

The New church of Cathedral presently seen was built under the leadership of Mar. Sebastian Vayalil, the first bishop of Palai.

== See also ==
- List of Jesuit sites
