= Kadalikkattil Mathai Kathanar =

Venerable Mathew of Kadalikkattil
- Born: 25 April 1872; Palai, Kerala
- Died: 23 May 1935 (aged 63); Kerala, India

Kadalikkattil Mathai Kathanar (25 April 1872 - 1 May 1872) was a priest of the Syro-Malabar Church in India, and the founder of Sacred Heart Congregation.

== Life ==
Kathanar was born on 25 April 1872 in Palai, Kerala, India. He attended the seminar conducted in the Syrian Carmelite monastery at Mannanam. He was ordained priest on 17 February, 1901. Over the next ten years, he served at Karoor, Lalam and Pala. He founded the Sacred Heart Congregation on 1 January 1911. He also set up schools in Harijan and Kannadiurumpu.

He died on 23 May 1935. He was buried at the Holy Magi Church in Pala, but two years later his remains were transferred to the Provincial house Chapel of the Sacred Heart Sisters in Pala.

== Beatification process ==
Kathanar was raised to the status of the Servant of God on 12 April 1989.

The beatification process for Kathanar was opened on 12 November 1989, and he was declared Venerable on 27 October 2011 by Pope Benedict XVI.

Kathanar is remembered every year during the Sradha ceremony on 23 May.
