= Joseph Pallikaparampil =

Indian bishop (born 1927)

Bishop Joseph Pallikaparampil
- Church: Syro-Malabar Church
- Archdiocese: Syro-Malabar Catholic Archeparchy of Changanacherry
- Diocese: Syro-Malabar Catholic Eparchy of Palai
- See: Pala
- Appointed: Episcopal Ordination as Auxiliary Bishop; 15 August 1973; Bishop; 6 February 1981
- Predecessor: Sebastian Vayalil
- Successor: Joseph Kallarangatt

Orders
- Ordination: 23 November 1958

Personal details
- Born: 10 April 1927 (age 99) Mutholapuram, India
- Parents: Varkey Devasia & Katri
- Motto: that they may have life

Mar Joseph Pallikaparambil (born 10 April 1927) is a bishop of the Syro-Malabar Catholic Church and the current Bishop Emeritus of Pala, Kottayam, India. He was the Second Bishop of Palai after Bishop Sebastian Vayalil.

On 18 March 2004, Joseph Kallarangatt was appointed as the 3rd Bishop of the Syro-Malabar Catholic Eparchy of Palai, after the resignation of Bishop Pallikaparampil.
