= Thottackad =

Thottakad
- village
- Interactive map of Thottakad
- Coordinates: 9°31′0″N 76°36′0″E
- Country: India
- State: Kerala
- District: Kottayam

Population (2011)
  - Total: 13,990

Languages
  - Official: Malayalam, English
- Time zone: UTC+5:30 (IST)
- PIN: 686539
- Telephone code: 0481
- Vehicle registration: KL-05, KL-33
- Lok Sabha constituency: Kottayam
- Vidhan Sabha constituency: Puthuppally

Thottakad is a village in Kottayam district in the state of Kerala, India. The nearest towns are Changanacherry and Kottayam.

== Demographics ==
As of 2011 India census, Thottakad had a population of 13,990 with 6,841 males and 7,149 females.

== Transportation ==
Thottakad is a village in Kottayam district, in Kerala state. There are many buses passing via Thottakad. Main bus routes are - Kottayam–Karukachal-Mallappally-Kozhenchery, Kottayam–Karukachal-Mallappally-Ranni, Kottayam–Karukachal-Manimala-Ranny and Kottayam-Perumbanachy-Changanacherry. Thottakad is 14 kilometres from Kottayam town towards karukachal route.

== Temples and churches ==
Thottakkad Sree Sankaranarayana Swamy Temple is one of the important temples of the glory days of King Thekkumkoor. When Thekkumkoor became part of Venad during the reign of King Marthanda Varma, most of Thottakkad belonged to Devaswom. The temple, which is over a thousand years old, was under the control of the government. St.George Catholic Church, Mar Aprem Church, Pentecostal Church of God [IPC] (thottkakad bethel ipc), Assemblies of God church [Pentecostal church], The Pentecostal Mission [TPM], Eravuchira St. Mary's Church, P.R.D.S Church Koduvelil, St Mary's Bethelahem Orthodox Church Thottakad, Thottakad Sankaranarayana Swami Temple, Sreenarayanaguru Temple Thottakkadu, Kuruthikaaman Kaavu Temple, and Rajamattom Church.

== Administration ==
Thottakadu is under Vakathanam and Puthupally Grama Panchayath. It is located 14 kilometres west of District headquarters Kottayam.

== Post Office ==
There is a post office in this village and the pin code is 686539.

== Essential Data ==
- Village Thottakadu
- Block Pallom
- District Kottayam
- State Kerala
- Country India
- Continent Asia
- Time Zone IST (UTC + 05:30)
- Currency Indian Rupee (INR )
- Dialing Code +91
- Date format dd/mm/yyyy
- Driving side left
- Language Malayalam

== Educational institutions ==
- Eravuchira St. George UPS
- Thottakad Government Higher Secondary School
- St. Thomas High School Thottakad
- Government Teacher Training college Center Thottakad
- H.W.L.P. School.
- CMS LP School, Ezhuvanthanam
