= St. Berchmans College =

Government Aided Catholic college in Kerala, India

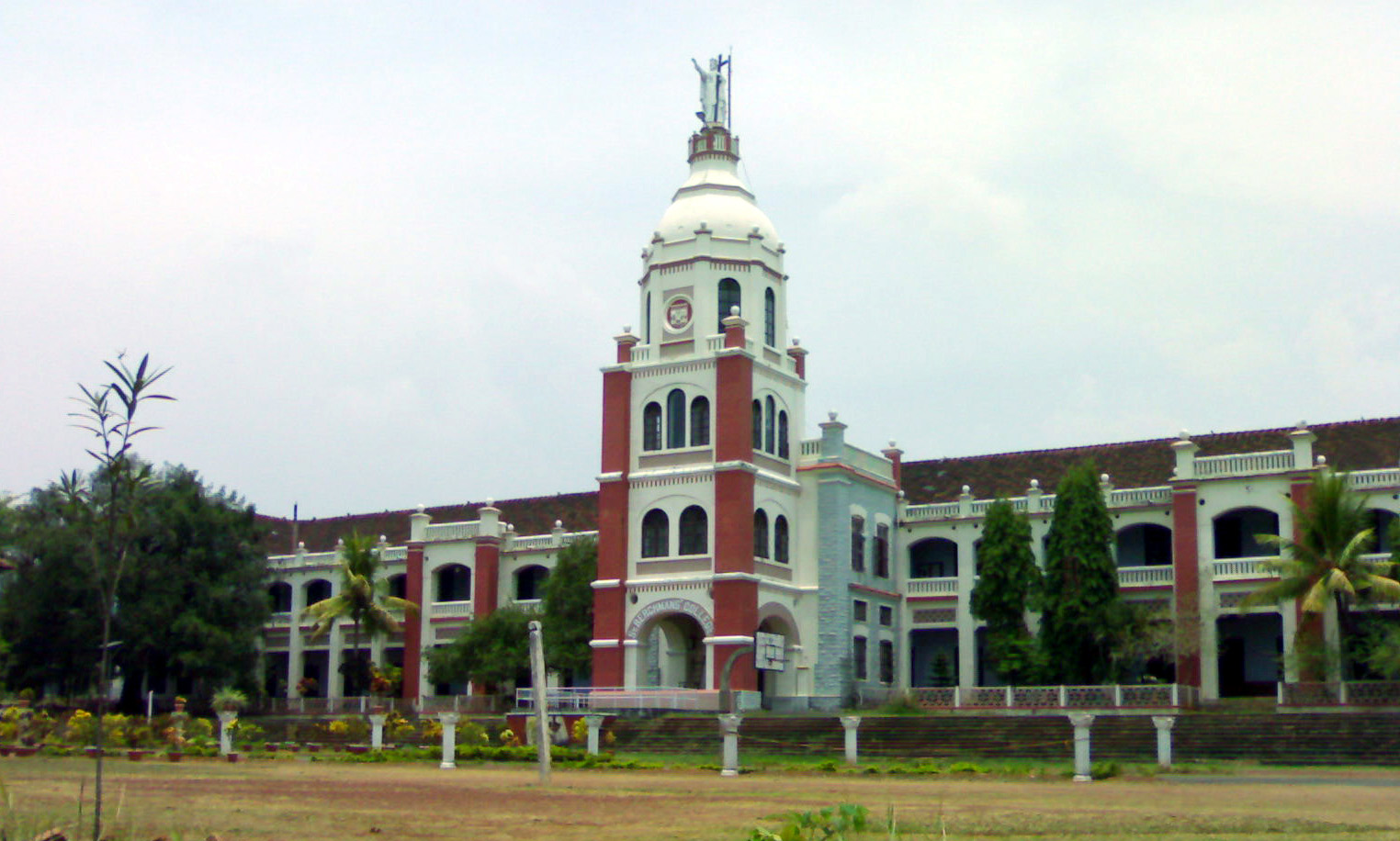
- Tower Block, SB College
- Other name: SB College
- Motto: Latin: Caritas Vera Nobilitas
- Motto in English: Charity or Love of one's Fellow men is true Nobility.
- Type: Autonomous
- Established: 19 June 1922; 104 years ago
- Founder: Venerable Mar Thomas Kurialacherry
- Parent institution: Syro-Malabar Catholic Archdiocese of Changanassery
- Religious affiliation: Syro Malabar Catholic Church
- Academic affiliations: Mahatma Gandhi University, Kottayam
- Principal: Rev. Fr. (Dr.) Teddy C. Kanjooparambil
- Patron: Mar Thomas Tharayil
- Academic staff: 200
- Administrative staff: 50
- Students: 3000+
- Location: Changanassery, Kerala, India; 9°27′05″N 76°32′19″E
- Campus: Semi-urban
- Nickname: SBC
- Website: www.sbcollege.ac.in

St. Berchmans College, popularly known as SB College, is one of the first autonomous colleges in Kerala, India. Located in Changanasserry, just 17 km from Kottayam, the college was established in 1922 and is recognized as one of the oldest and most prestigious institutions of higher education in the country. The University Grants Commission (UGC) has recognized SB College under its "College with Potential for Excellence" scheme. On 13 June 2014, both the UGC and the Government of Kerala granted autonomy to the institution. The college marked its centenary during the academic year 2022, celebrating 100 years of academic excellence and service.

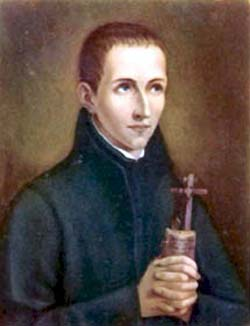
St John Berchmans

The college is named after John Berchmans, a 17th century Belgian Jesuit saint, who is also the patron saint of the college and is venerated in the Church as the Patron Saint of Students and Scholars. The college is situated in the town of Changanassery 18 kilometers south of Kottayam. Established in 1922, It has 19 postgraduate and eight research departments. It offers 17 UG, 21 PG, 3 MPhil, and 9 doctoral programmes. Students and alumni of the college are referred to as 'Berchmanites'. It is run by the Syro Malabar Catholic Archdiocese of Changanassery, is affiliated to the Mahatma Gandhi University in Kottayam and is recognized by the University Grants Commission (UGC).

The college was first accredited with 'Five Star' in 1999 and reaccredited with 'A+' in 2006. In the third cycle of accreditation in 2012, the college was graded at A. In 2017, it was again reaccredited with 'A' grade. The University Grants Commission (UGC) and the Government of Kerala granted autonomy to this college in 2014. In 1996 and 1997, it won the "R. Shankar Award" for the Best College in the State, instituted by the Government of Kerala. In 2004, the UGC identified the college under its "College with Potential for Excellence" scheme. The National Commission for Minority Educational Institution, New Delhi has granted minority status to the college in 2010. All the Science Departments are supported by the FIST of DST, Government of India. It has been ranked among the top 100 Indian colleges by the National Institutional Ranking Framework (NIRF), MHRD, Government of India since 2018. The college also has two sister institutions - Assumption College, Changanassery and St Berchmans Higher Secondary School, Changanasserry.

== History ==
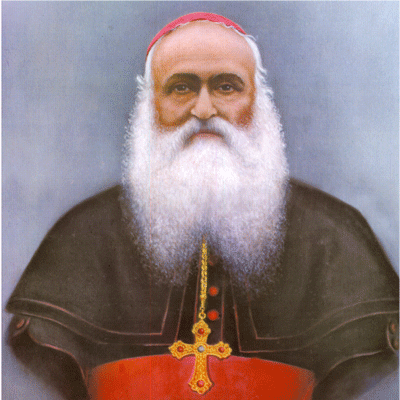
Msgr. Mar Charles Lavigne

St Berchmans College is the first higher education institution under the Syro-Malabar Catholic Archeparchy of Changanacherry. After the establishment of St Berchmans English High School, Changanasserry by first Vicar Apostolic of Kottayam, Msgr. Fr. Charles Lavigne and clergy of Catholic Church in 1891, he laid the foundation stone of the college in 1895 on seeing the need for an institution of higher education in Travancore and Malabar region. The college was established in 1922 by Venerable Mar Thomas Kurialacherry, Bishop of Changanassery diocese with the help of both the Catholic Church and the Travancore royal family. In 1925, the college was transferred to its current place.

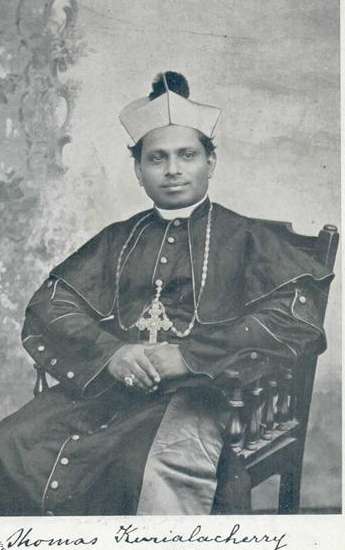
Venerable Mar Thomas Kurialacherry

In 1925, the college authorities decided to install the 12 feet tall statue of Christ the King, brought from Spain, on the top of the College Tower, on a 6 feet tall pedestal. The college chapel, built in 1940, was named Christ King's Chapel, after the installation of the statue. Today, the college is affiliated to MG University, Kottayam.

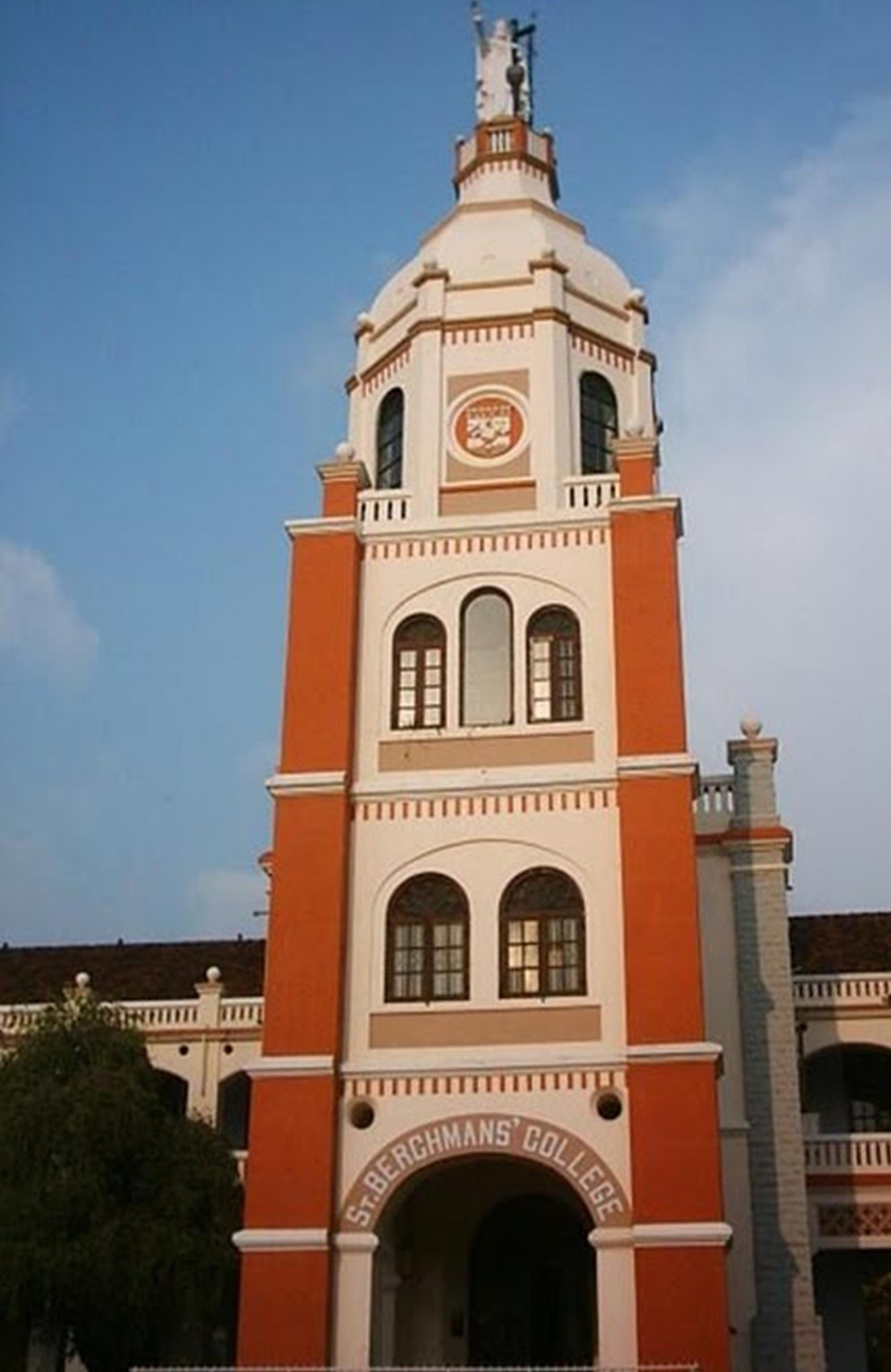
The College Tower with statue of Christ the King on top

In June 2022, the relics of St John Berchmans brought from Italy were placed in the College Chapel, as part of the centenary.

== College crest ==
The college crest features a Greek cross dividing four quarters. The dove symbolizes the Holy Spirit, the fleur-de-lis represents purity, and the coconut trees signify Kerala. Waves depict the college's location, and the open book on the Greek cross symbolizes wisdom. The Latin motto "Caritas Vera Nobilitas" and its Sanskrit equivalent "सैभ्रात्रं हि कूलीनता (saibhrātram hi kūlīnatā)" are inscribed below the shield.

== Rankings ==
College rankings

General – India
- NIRF (Colleges) (2024): 69

The college was ranked 54 in All India ranking by NIRF (National Institutional Ranking Framework) in 2023,69 in 2024, and 56 in 2025.

== Erudite Lecture Series ==
The college brings Nobel laureates and other scholars including as Ei-ichi Negishi (Nobel in Chemistry 2010) in 2016, Ada E Yonath (Nobel in Chemistry, 2009) in 2019, Anthony James Leggett (Nobel in Physics 2003) in 2020 and Martin Chalfie (Nobel in Chemistry 2008) in 2021.

== Institute of Management Studies (BIMS) ==
Berchmans Institute of Management Studies (BIMS) established in 1995, is under the management of St. Berchmans College affiliated to Mahatma Gandhi University, Kottayam.

== Recognition ==
St Berchmans College is today considered to be one of the top ten colleges in Kerala and has always been in the top 100 colleges in India. The college is today a heritage instituition of higher education in Kerala.

UGC has recognized the college as 'College with Potential for Excellence'. It is one of the first colleges in Kerala to undergo NAAC accreditation and is currently undergoing fifth cycle. In May 2006, NAAC accredited the college with Grade A+. In 2012, the college was re-accredited with Grade A in the country with a CGPA of 3.37 on a four-point scale. In 2017, it was re-accredited with Grade A. It is also one of the topmost NAAC-accredited college in Kerala with the highest CGPA.

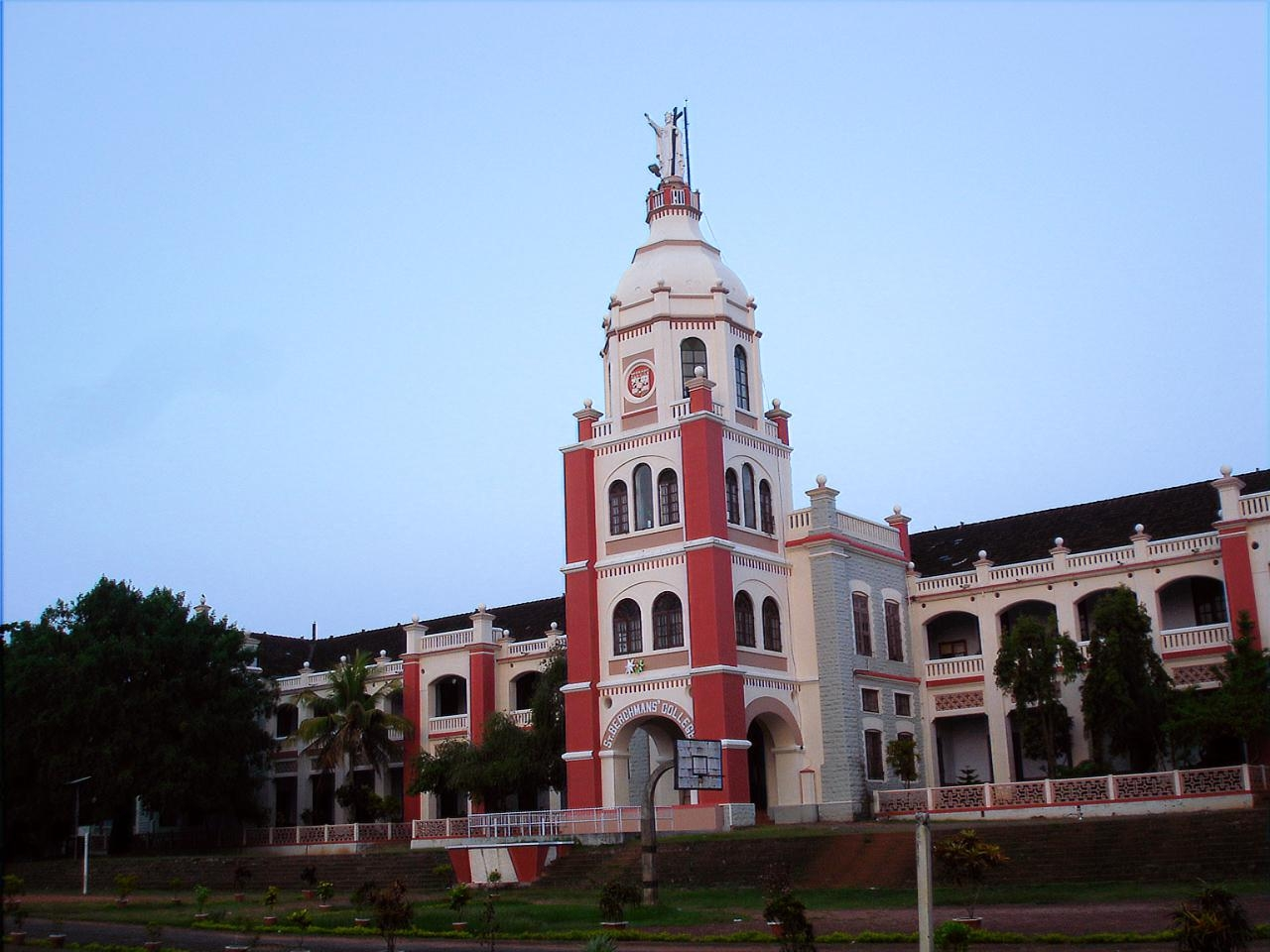
Architecture of SB College

Formerly one of the last remaining male-only colleges, St Berchmans opened its door to female students to various undergraduate programmes in 2024.

The college is noted for its combination of Victorian architecture, characterized by the use of red bricks, pointed and semicircular arches, ornate detailing, dome and towering structures, with a blend of Dutch colonial and Dravidian architecture, especially in the college tower, Kurialacherry block and the chapel. The college has one of the largest college libraries in South India, with more than a collection of 100,000 books. The college kept the 100 year old tradition of starting the day with the one minute hymn 'Lead, Kindly Light' by Cardinal Newman which is said to halt everyone from their work. The college is notable for producing three Cardinals of Catholic Church .

As a part of the centenary, the college underwent major renovations and heritage restoration in 2022.

The college has produced a diverse alumni ranging from politicians to businessmen, writers to actors, religious leaders to scientists, athletes to military personnel and civil servants.

== Notable alumni ==
One of the legendary actors of the Malayalam film industry, Prem Nazir, an alumnus of the college, said

"Back in my college days, that is when I was in Changanaserry SB College, I got a chance to play my first character as Shylock in Merchant Of Venice directed by CA Sheppard, a professor of English department in SB. He was also the one that helped me to reach my first film, Thyagaseema, which I acted with Sathyan Sir."

Though he was active in student politics, Oommen Chandy was not engaged in activism within the campus when he was student of BA Economics in SB.

"It has been 55 years since I passed out of college. Still, I try to go to the campus at least once every year. I also found time to attend the alumni meet on the Republic Day for the past few years."

The college has produced two Chief Ministers, Oommen Chandy and P.K. Vasudevan Nair, former minister in the first EMS Namboodiripad ministry and Communist Leader T. V. Thomas, first Opposition Leader and former Home Minister, P T Chacko, a number of writers and artists, including Prem Nazir, MG Soman, Kunchacko Boban, Sibi Malayil, Jeethu Joseph, Martin Prakatt, George Onakkoor, Muttathu Varkey and Vishnunarayanan Namboothiri, three cardinals of the Catholic Church, Mar George Alencherry, Moran Mor Baselious Cleemis and Mar George Koovakad (which is highest for any college in India), NSS General Secretary PK Narayana Panicker, archbishops including Mar Joseph Powathil, Mar Joseph Perumthottam, Former Apostolic Nuncio Mar George Kochery, Mar Thomas Tharayil, Bishop of Malankara Orthodox Syrian Church of Niranam Diocese Yuhanon Mar Chrysostamos, Bishop of Malankara Jacobite Syrian Church of Niranam Diocese Coorilose Mar Geevarghese besides a long list of legal luminaries, bureaucrats and academicians such as Justice Cyriac Joseph, C.V. Ananda Bose, Raju Narayana Swami, Jancy James, B. Ekbal and so on.

Name	Class Year	Degree	Notability
Kuzhikalail M. Abraham	1962-1965, 1965-1967	BSc. Chemistry, MSc. Chemistry	Scientist, professor, and expert on lithium-ion batteries
George Alencherry		BA. Economics	Cardinal and former Major Archbishop of Syro Malabar Catholic Church
Moran Mor Baselius Cleemis		BA. Economics	Cardinal and Major Archbishop of Syro Malankara Catholic Church
Justice A. M. Babu			Former judge of Kerala High Court (2016-2019)
Fr. Gabriel Chiramel CMI		Pre-university degree	Indian Syro-Malabar Catholic priest, educationist, zoologist, author and social reformer
T. V. Thomas		Pre-university Degree	Indian Communist leader, first Minister of Labour and Transport
Kunchacko Boban		Pre-university degree	Actor
Dr. C. V. Ananda Bose			Retd. IAS officer, 22nd Governor of West Bengal
P. T. Chacko			Former Home Minister of Kerala
Bipin Chandran			Scriptwriter
K.M. Chandy			Former governor (MP, Gujarat & Pondicherry)
Oommen Chandy		BA. Economics	Former Chief Minister of Kerala
Dr. B. Ekbal			Kerala State Planning Board member, former Kerala University VC
V. J. James			Writer
Cyriac Joseph			Retired Supreme Court Justice
George Joseph			Padma Bhushan ISRO scientist
Jeethu Joseph			Film director
P. J. Joseph			Former Education Minister, Ex. MLA
Yuhanon Chrysostamos		BSc Mathematics	Bishop of Malankara Orthodox Niranam Archdiocese
Mar George Koovakad		Pre-university degree, BSc. Chemistry	Cardinal of Nisibis
Manoj Kuroor			Writer
Sibi Malayil		Pre-university degree	Film director
N. Sreekantan Nair			Former MP for Kollam Constituency
Prem Nazir			Film actor
Vishnunarayanan Namboothiri			Poet, writer
Raju Narayanaswamy			IAS - Addl. Secretary, Govt. of Kerala
George Onakkoor		MA. Malayalam	Novelist, short story writer
P. K. Narayana Panicker			Former NSS General Secretary
P. Parameswaran (AKA Parameshwarji )			Director of Bharatiya Vichara Kendra, Rashtriya Swayamsevak Sangh (RSS) ideologue, Padmavibhooshan awardee
Dr. Jitheshji			World's fastest performing cartoonist, former vice chairman of Kerala Cartoon Academy
Martin Prakkat			Film director
Coorilose Mar Geevarghese		Intermediate degree and BA English	Metropolitian of Malankara Syrian Jacobite Niranam Diocese
Dr. M. V. Pylee			Indian scholar, Padmabhushan awardee, former vice chancellor - Cochin University of Science and Technology
A. A. Rahim			Indian politician, freedom fighter, and union minister
Justice C. T. Ravikumar			Judge Supreme Court of India
John Sankaramangalam			Filmmaker and former director of the FTII, Pune
M. G. Soman		Pre-university degree	Film actor
K.C. Joseph		BA. Economics	Former minister of Rural Development
Prof N.M. Joseph		BA Economics	Former minister of Forest
P. C. Thomas			Former Central Minister
Mar George Kocherry		BA. Economics	Bishop of Ghana and Togo
Santosh Thundiyil		BSc. Chemistry	Cinematographer
Vinu Abraham		BA. Economics	Script writer
Joseph Powathil		BA Economics, Head of Economics Department	former Archbishop of Changanasserry
Joseph Perumthottam		Intermediate degree, BA	former Archbishop of Changanasserry
Thomas Tharayil			Archbishop of Changanasserry
Thomas Padiyath		Intermediate degree	Auxiliary Bishop of Shamshabad diocese

== In popular culture ==
The college has been featured in many films such as Tamil-language romantic drama Autograph (2004), Malayalam-language action crime film Masters (2012), Malayalam romantic comedy film Doctor Love (2011) and The Campus (2005).
