= Joseph Powathil =

Syro-Malabar Archbishop

Mar Joseph Powathil ܡܪܝ ܝܘܣܦ ܦܘܐܬܝܠ
- Metropolitan Archbishop of Archeparchy of Changanacherry (1985-2007)
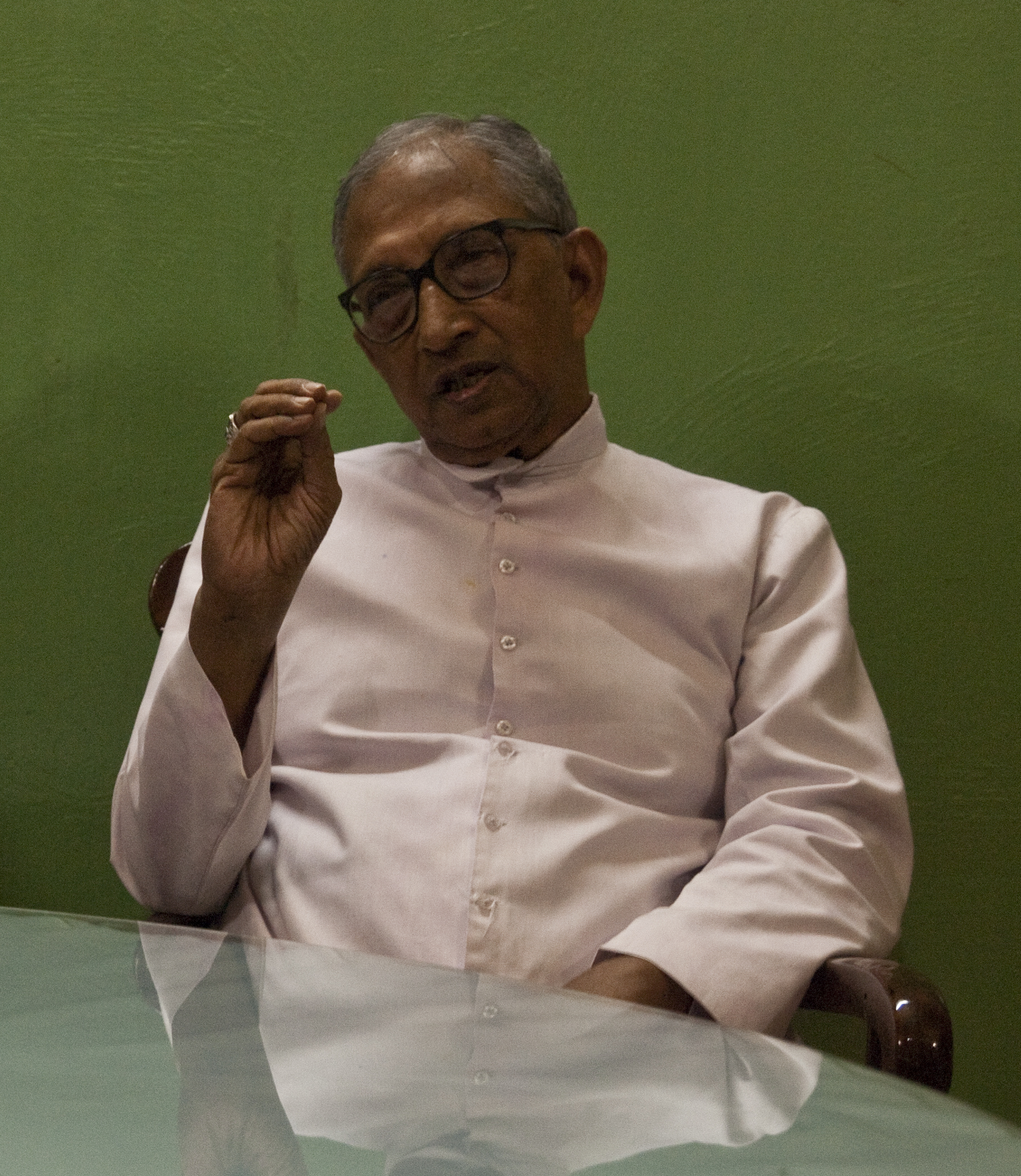
- Archdiocese: Archeparchy of Changanacherry
- Predecessor: Antony Padiyara
- Successor: Joseph Perumthottam
- Other posts: former chairman, Inter-church Council of Kerala

Orders
- Ordination: 3 October 1962
- Consecration: 13 February 1972 by Pope Paul VI

Personal details
- Born: 14 August 1930 Kurumpanadom, Travancore, British Raj
- Died: 18 March 2023 (aged 92) Changanassery, Kerala, India
- Buried: Marth Mariyam Kabaridappally, Changanacherry
- Residence: Archbishop's House, Changanacherry
- Parents: Ulahannan Joseph, Mariamma
- Education: St. Berchman's High School; St. Berchmans College; Loyola College, Chennai; Papal Seminary, Pune; University of Oxford (1 year Economics course
- Motto: "Truth and Charity”

Mar Joseph Powathil (Syriac: ܡܪܝ ܝܘܣܦ ܦܘܐܬܝܠ, romanized: Mar Yawsep Powathil) (14 August 1930 – 18 March 2023) was an Indian prelate of the Syro-Malabar Catholic Church. He was the Metropolitan Archbishop of the Archeparchy of Changanassery, serving from 1985 until 2007. He was also the first bishop of Kanjirappally, having served from 1977 to 1985. He served as the President of the Catholic Bishops' Conference of India (CBCI) from 1994 to 1998. Powathil was one of the youngest bishops in India, having been ordained bishop at the age of 41 and Pope Paul VI was his principal consecrator. A scholar in theology, Powathil is known for his stance in matters related to the Syro-Malabar Church's liturgy and restoration of eastern traditions. His stance on the fee structure of self-financing colleges had once become a challenge for the Kerala state government.

== Early life ==
Powathil was born in the hamlet of Kurumbanadom, near Chanaganacherry, British India. He was known as Pappachan in his childhood, and was officially known as P. J. Joseph. He went to school at Holy Family LP School and St. Peter's UP School, and then at St. Berchmans' High School in Changanacherry. He attended St. Berchmans' College, Changanacherry for a B.A. Economics and Loyola College, Chennai from which he received an M.A. in economics.

== Priestly ministry ==
Powathil did his seminary studies in St. Thomas Seminary Changanacherry and Papal Seminary, Pune. He was ordained priest on 3 October 1962. He was appointed auxiliary bishop of Changanacherry (Titular Bishop of Caesarea Philippi) on 29 January 1972, despite having little Episcopal experience, and was consecrated by Pope Paul VI on 13 February 1972. On 26 February 1977, a new diocese was created under the name Kanjirappally, splitting the Changanacherry archdiocese. Bishop Powathil was transferred there as the first bishop. He served the new diocese for nine years. He rose to become archbishop and returned to Changanacherry on 16 November 1985, succeeding Antony Padiyara.

== Offices held ==
He served as President of Catholic Bishops Conference of India (CBCI) (1994–1998), Chairman of Kerala Catholic Bishops Council (1993–1996), and Chairman of Education Commission of the CBCI. He has been a member of the Post Asian Synodal Council in Rome, Italy since 1998, Chairman of KCBC Commission for Education (since 1986), Founder and Chairman of Inter Church Council for Education, Chairman of Inter Religious Fellowship, member of the Pro Oriente Foundation in Vienna, Austria (since 1993) and member of the Scientific Commission of International Publication 'Oasis' in Venice, Italy.

== Service ==
He founded the Peerumedu Development Society (P.D.S.) and the Malanadu Development Society (M. D. S.) in 1977 while he was the bishop of Kanjirappaly. The Kuttanadu Vikasana Samithy (KVS) is another project of his. As the Patron of the Changanacherry Social Service Society (CHASS), he oversaw numerous developmental schemes. Many Scholarship schemes are established for the Dalit Christians in the Archdiocese and the poor and eligible students of the professional courses.

In 1990, Powathil founded the I. C. Chacko award for cultural and literary excellence and it was awarded to Prof. P. C. Devasia, the author of Kristu Bhagavathom in Sanskrit language. The Centre for Indian Christian Archaeological Research (CICAR) is another initiative. In order to promote reading, Powathil established the Department of Book Apostolate, which organizes the Changanacherry Pusthaka Mela every year in October.

He established the Diocesan Youth Movement called 'Yuvadeepti' in 1972. It eventually turned into the Kerala Catholic Youth Movement (KCYM). He was the first chairman of the KCBC Youth Commission. He started Apostolate for the senior citizens, apostolate for the emigrants and apostolate for the tourists in the Archdiocese. He led CANA, the Indian Section of the Pope John Paul II Institute for Studies on Marriage and Family, at Thuruthy with headquarters in Rome.

Preceded by None (New Diocese)	Bishop of the Syro-Malabar Catholic Eparchy of Kanjirappally; 1977–1985	Succeeded by Mathew Vattakuzhy
Preceded by Mar Antony Padiyara	Metropolitan of the Syro-Malabar Catholic Archeparchy of Changanassery; 1985–2008	Succeeded by Joseph Perumthottam
