= Archeparchy of Changanacherry =

Eastern Catholic archeparchy in Kerala, India

Archeparchy of Changanacherry Changanacherrensis: ܐܪܟܝܕܝܘܩܝܐ ܕܫܢܓܢܫܪܝ; ചങ്ങനാശ്ശേരി അതിരൂപത

Catholic
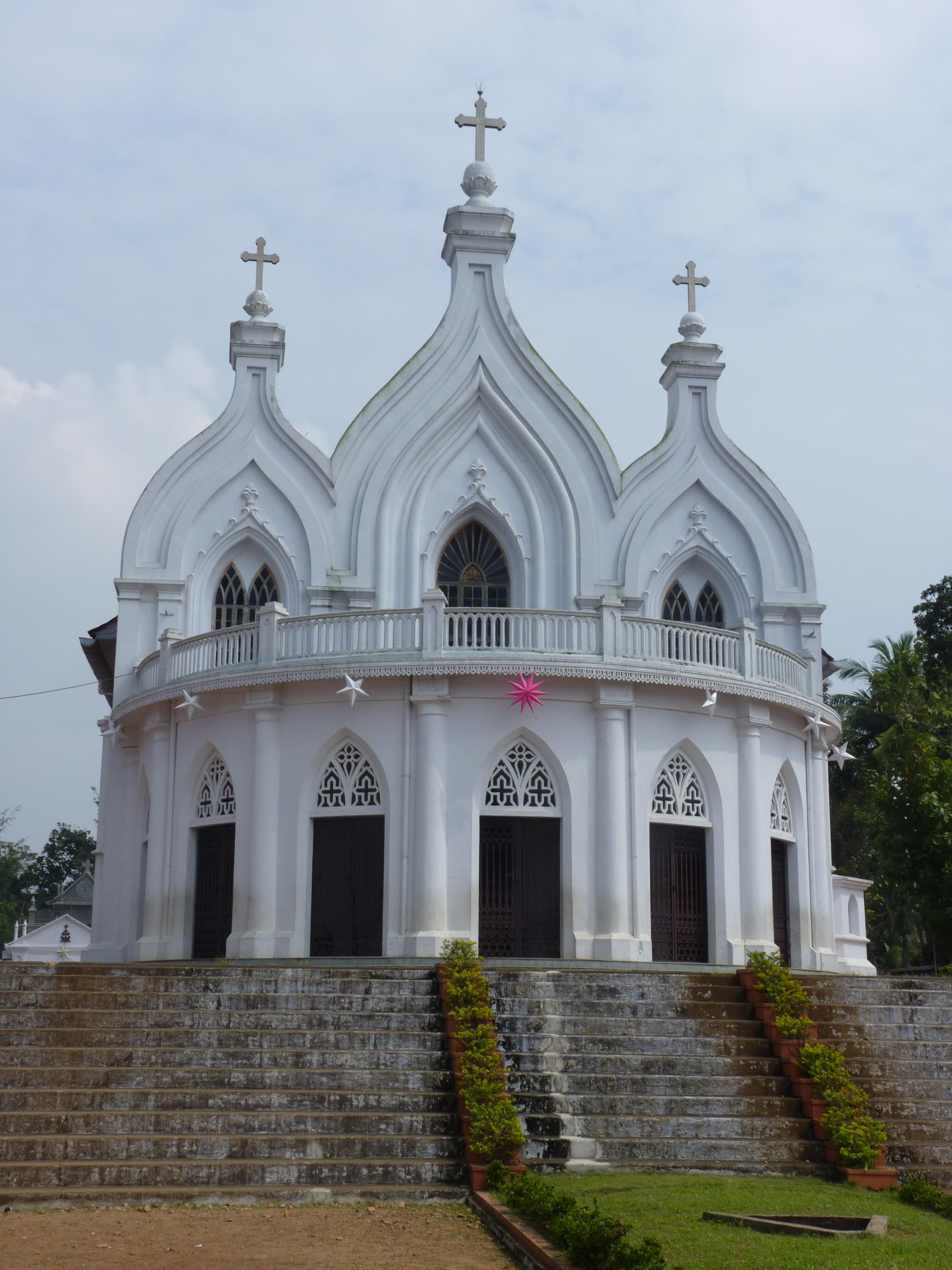
- St Mary’s Metropolitan Cathedral Changanacherry

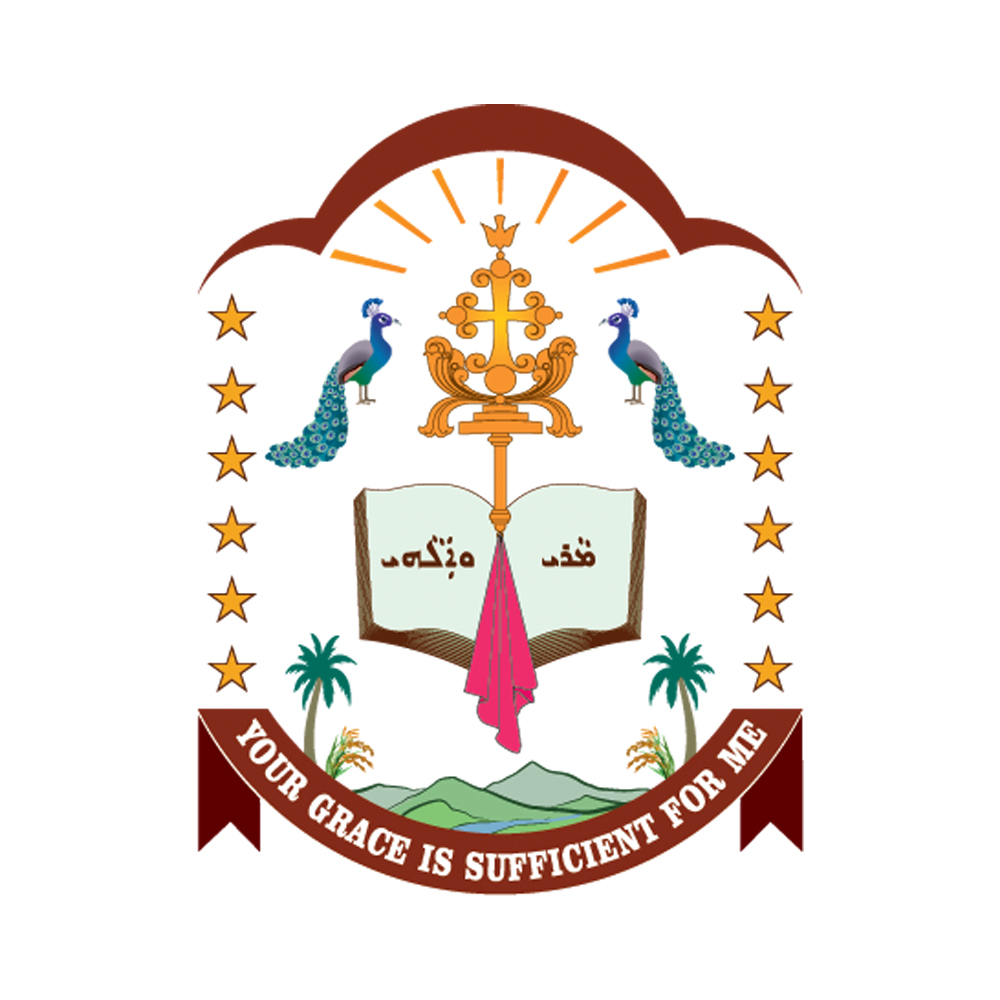
- Coat of arms

Location
- Country: India
- Territory: Districts of Kottayam, Alappuzha, Pathanamthitta, Kollam, and Thiruvananthapuram in Kerala, and Kanyakumari in Tamil Nadu
- Episcopal conference: Syro-Malabar Synod of Bishops
- Coordinates: 9°26′38.49″N 76°32′10.77″E

Statistics
- Area: 8,450 km^{2} (3,260 sq mi)
- Population: Total; Catholics: (as of 2023); 10,455,520; 402,275 (3.8%)
- Parishes: 248 (2023)

Information
- Denomination: Catholic Church
- Sui iuris church: Syro-Malabar Church
- Rite: Syro-Malabaric Rite
- Established: Vicariate Apostolic: 28 July 1896 (130 years ago); Eparchy: 21 December 1923 (102 years ago); Archeparchy: 29 July 1956 (70 years ago)
- Archdiocese: Changanacherry
- Cathedral: St Mary's Metropolitan Cathedral in Changanassery
- Patron saint: Saint Joseph
- Secular priests: 508 (2026)

Current leadership
- Pope: Leo XIV
- Major Archbishop: Raphael Thattil
- Metropolitan Archbishop: Thomas Tharayil
- Bishops emeritus: Joseph Perumthottam

Website
- www.archdiocesechanganacherry.org

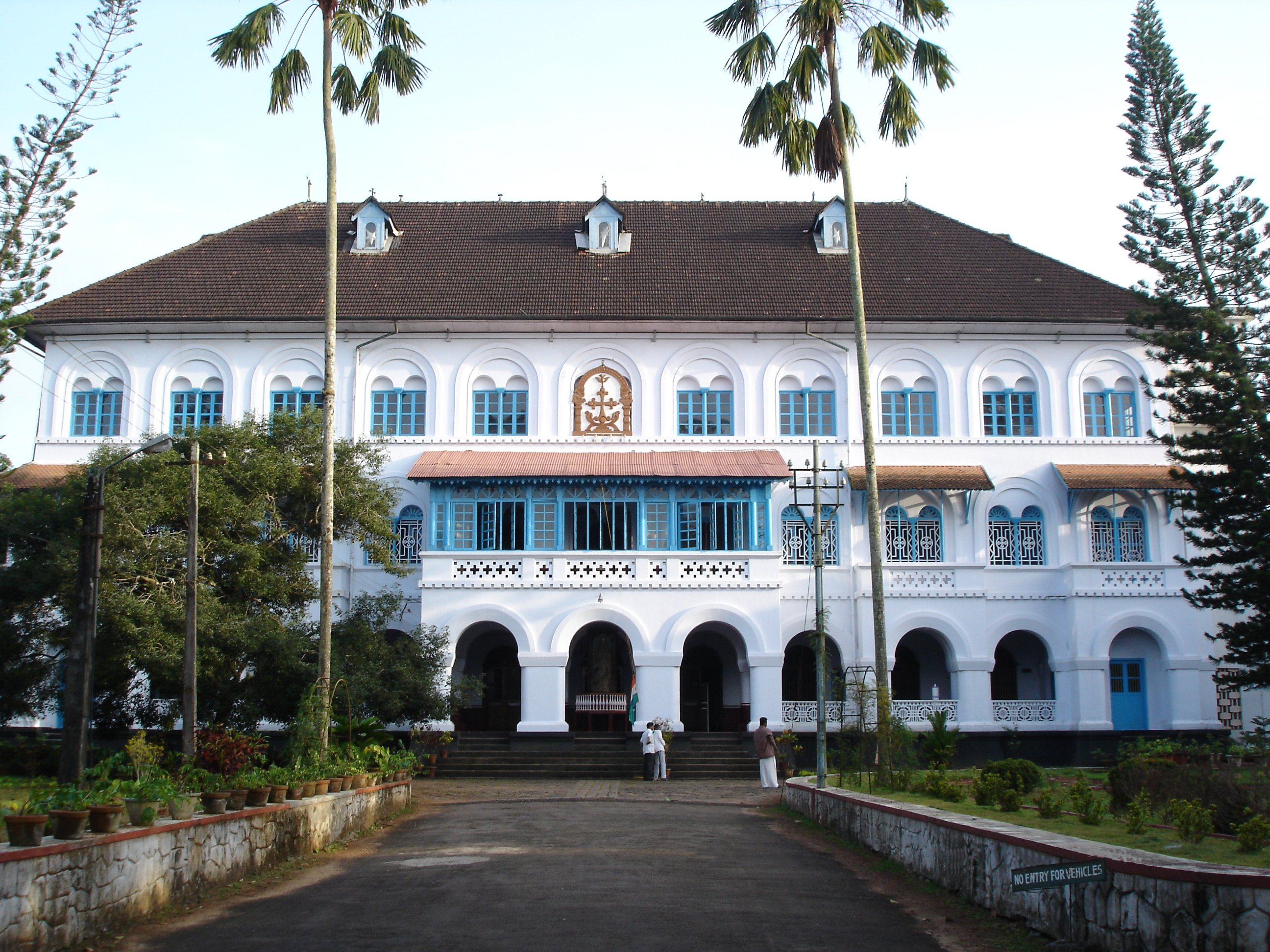
Headquarters of the Metropolitan Archeparchy of Changanacherry

The Syro-Malabar Catholic Archeparchy of Changanacherry (Syriac: ܐܦܪܟܝܐ ܪܒܬܐ ܕܫܢܓܢܐܣܐܪܐ, romanized: Afarkaya Rabbta d-Shanganasara; Malayalam: ചങ്ങനാശ്ശേരി അതിരൂപത, romanized: Changanassery Atirūpata) is a Syro-Malabar Church archeparchy of the Catholic Church with an area of 24,595 km^{2} comprising the districts of Kottayam(excluding Vaikom), Alappuzha(excluding Cherthala), Pathanamthitta, Kollam, and Thiruvananthapuram in Kerala, and also Kanyakumari district in Tamil Nadu. It is one of the largest Catholic dioceses in India in terms of area. Mar Thomas Tharayil is the current Metropolitan Archbishop, serving from 2024. Suffragan eparchies of the Changanassery archeparchy includes Palai, Kanjirappally-Nilackal, and Thuckalay-Thiruvithancode (Tamil Nadu).

The Changanacherry (originally named Kottayam) jurisdiction was one of the first two Syro-Malabar vicariates, along with Syro-Malabar Catholic Archeparchy of Thrissur, when Pope Leo XIII in 1887 re-organized Syro-Malabar Catholics as a separate church from the Latin Church's jurisdiction ever since the Synod of Diamper in 1599.

== History ==
The Apostolic Church of St. Thomas Christians traditionally traces its origin to St. Thomas, the Apostle, who is held to have arrived on the Kerala Coast in A.D. 52. In the course of history this Church entered into good relationship with the East Syriac Church. The presbiteral office of the Archdeacon of all India did the temporal administration.

The Portuguese missionaries who arrived in the 15th century could not decipher the liturgical traditions and the mode of governance of this Church. They Latinized the ancient liturgical texts and forced existing East Syriac Christians or Nasranis to convert to the Roman Catholic Church under the Padroado Archbishop of Goa. When the domination of the Portuguese missionaries became unbearable, a section of this community broke away from western supremacy in 1653 and accepted allegiance to Antiochian West Syriac Rite and Miaphysite belief. But a good number returned to the East Syriac Catholic fold through unification efforts. Those who did not return constitute the present Malankara Churches. The others maintained and regained loyalty to the Apostolic See of Rome. This relationship started only in 1553 as a half Catholic-half Nestorian position due to a split in the Babylonian Church of the East and strengthened in 1599 through the Udayamperur sunnahadose (Synod of Diamper).

The first two Vicariates of the Syro-Malabar Church are Trichur and Kottayam. The Archdiocese of Changanacherry is part of the Kottayam Vicariate and the second Metropolitan Archdiocese of the Syro-Malabar Church, after the establishment of the Syro-Malabar hierarchy which was the prelude to the restoration of the identity of the Church in 1992 as a Sui Iuris Church. Pope Leo XIII of happy memory by his Bull 'Quod Iam Pridem' dated 20 May 1887 established two Vicariates Apostolic - Kottayam and Thrissur; exclusively for the Syro-Malabarians. Dr. Charles Lavigne for Kottayam and Dr. Adolph Medlycott for Trichur respectively were appointed the Vicars Apostolic.

The same Pope reorganised the existing Vicariates by the Bull 'Quae Rei Sacrae' dated 28 July 1896 establishing a new Vicariate, Ernakulam, with territories carved out from the two existing Vicariates (1) Pallippuram, Alappuzha, 2) Edappally and 3) Arakuzha divisions from Kottayam Vicariate). Indigenous bishops were appointed Vicars Apostolic in the new Sees. They included Mar Mathew Makil for Changanacherry, Mar Louis Pazheparambil (from Changanacherry Vicariate) for Ernakulam and Mar John Menacherry (from Ernakulam Vicariate) for Thrissur.

A new Vicariate of Kottayam was constituted in 1911 exclusively for the Southists and Mar Mathew Makil was transferred to Kottayam as the Vicar Apostolic of Southists and Mar Thomas Kurialacherry was appointed the Vicar Apostolic of Changanacherry. With the establishment of the Syro-Malabar Hierarchy on 21 December 1923 by the Bull 'Romani Pontifices' of Pope Pius XI, the Diocese of Thrissur, Changanacherry and Kottayam became suffragans of the Archdiocese of Ernakulam thereby constituting the first Modern Syro-Malabar Province.

On 25 July 1950 the Diocese of Changanacherry was bifurcated by the Bull 'Quo Ecclesiarum' of Pope Pius XII and the new Diocese of Palai was created. The Holy See being impressed by the wonderful progress achieved by the Syro-Malabarians, extended the hitherto held boundaries of Changanacherry to the areas south of river Pamba, up to (including) Kanyakumari, by the Bull 'Multorum Fidelium' of Pope Pius XII, dated 29 April 1955. Changanacherry was raised to the status of an archdiocese on 26 July 1956 by Pope Pius XII constituting the second province in the Syro-Malabar Church and Kottayam and Pala became its suffragans. The Apostolic Constitution 'Regnum Caelorum' of 26 November 1959 of Pope John XXIII gave effect to this decision of Pope Pius XII.

In 1975 the missionary work of three (now five) civil districts of the Archdiocese of Agra in the State of Uttar Pradesh was taken up completely by the Archeparchy of Changanacherry. The Archdiocese was again divided on 26 February 1977 by the Bull 'Nos Beati Petri' of Pope Paul VI and the new Eparchy of Kanjirappilly was set up comprising parts of the Civil districts of Kottayam and Idukki. The Archeparchy was divided a fourth time when its Kanyakumari Mission was elevated to the status of a new diocese by the Bull Apud Indorum Gentes of John Paul II, dated 18 December 1996. The formal inauguration of the new eparchy of Thuckalay and the Episcopal consecration of Mar George Alencherry as its first Bishop took place on 2 February 1997.

The Archeparchy of Changanacherry now comprises the civil districts of Thiruvananthapuram, Kollam, Pathanamthitta, Alappuzha and Kottayam in Kerala and Palai, Kanjirapally and Thuckalay as its suffragans. Archbishop Mar Joseph Powathil assumed the office of the Archbishop of Changanacherry on 17 January 1986 and resigned in 2007. Mar Joseph Perumthottam was appointed on 20 January 2007 as the new Metropolitan Archbishop of Changanacherry and was installed on 19 March 2007.

== Ordinaries ==
Bishops and Archbishops

Sl.no	Ordinary	Designation	Year of appointment	Last year of service
1	Charles Lavigne	Vicar Apostolic of Changanacherry	1887	1896
2	Matthew Makil	Vicar Apostolic of Changanassery	1896	1911
3	Thomas Kurialacherry	Bishop	1911	1925
4	James Kalacherry	Bishop	1927	1949
5	Mathew Kavukattu	Archbishop	1950	1969
6	Antony Padiyara	Archbishop	1970	1985
7	Joseph Powathil	Archbishop	1985	2007
8	Joseph Perumthottam	Archbishop	2007	2024
9	Thomas Tharayil	Archbishop	2024	present

Auxiliary Bishops

Sl.no	Ordinary	Designation	Year of appointment	Last year of service
1	Joseph Powathil	Auxiliary bishop	1972	1977
2	Joseph Perumthottam	Auxiliary bishop	2002	2007
3	Thomas Tharayil	Auxiliary bishop	2017	2024

Prelates Hailing From The Archdiocese

Sl.no	Ordinary	Designation	Year of appointment	Last year of service
1	Aloysius Pazheparambil	First Vicar Apostolic of Ernakulam	1896	1919
2	Antony Cardinal Padiyara	The First Major Archbishop	1985	1996
3	Msgr. Jacob Vadakkeveettil CM	Administrator of Balasore	1968	1990
4	George Anathil SVD	Bishop of Indore	1973	2009
5	Joseph Pathalil	Bishop of Udaipur	1985	2012
6	Hyppolitus Kunnumkal OFM	Bishop Emeritus of Jammu - Srinagar	1986	1998
7	Simon Stock Palathra CMI	Bishop of Jagdalpur	1993	2013
8	George Alencherry	Bishop of Tuckalay	1997	2011
9	Mathew Cheriankunnel	Bishop Emeritus of Kurnool	1987	1995
10	George Kocherry	Apostolic Nuntio	2000	2022
11	George Cardinal Alencherry	Major Archbishop of Syro Malabar Church	2011	2023
12	Alex Thomas Kaliyaniyil SVD	Archbishop of Bulawayo (Zimbabwe)	2009	present
13	James Athikalam MST	Bishop of Sagar	2020	present
14	Thomas Padiyath	Auxiliary Bishop of Shamshabad	2022	present
15	George Jacob Koovakad	Titular Archbishop of Nisibis dei Caldei	2024	present

== Suffragan eparchies ==
- Syro-Malabar Catholic Eparchy of Palai
- Syro-Malabar Catholic Eparchy of Kanjirappally
- Syro-Malabar Catholic Eparchy of Thuckalay

== Institutions and personnel ==
The total number of parishes is nearly 300. In addition,. The population of Syro-Malabar Catholics in Changanacherry Archdiocese is nearly about 4 lakh+. There are 18 foranes under Changanacherry Archdiocese.

== Parishes and population ==
There are 18 Foranes under Archeparchy of Changanasserry:

01) Alappuzha Forane
02) Amboori Forane
03) Athirampuzha Forane
04) Champakkulam Forane
05) Changanacherry Forane
06) Chengannur Forane
07) Edathua Forane
08) Kollam-Ayur Forane
09) Kottayam Forane
10) Kudamaloor Forane
11) Kurumpanadom Forane
12) Manimala Forane
13) Muhamma Forane
14) Nedumkunnam Forane
15) Pulincunnu Forane
16) Thiruvananthapuram Forane
17) Thrickodithanam Forane
18) Thuruthy Forane

Institutions	Number
Foranes	18
Parishes	300
Filial churches	35
Shrines/Chapels	18
Colleges/Institutes	29
Higher Secondary Schools	29
Hostels	16

== Important events ==
- 16 January 1887: Reconstruction of the present Metropolitan Church.
- 15 April 1887: Nazarani Deepika launched.
- 20 May 1887: Establishment of Vicariates of Kottayam and Thrissur .
- 13 September 1887: Bishop Charles Lavigne, Vicar Apostolic of Kottayam.
- 10 May 1888: Bishop Charles assumes charge.
- 14 December 1888: Bishop Lavigne established St. Germane's, the first Orphanage and FCC.
- 18 December 1888: Bishop Charles Lavigne convenes Changanacherry Synod.
- 1 October 1890: Letter of Permission to shift the headquarters of Kottayam, Vicariate to Changanacherry.
- 3 February 1891: St. Berchmans English High School, the first high school of the Syrians founded on the precincts of St. Mary's Cathedral Changanacherry.
- 21 March 1891: Bishop Lavigne shifts his residence to Changanacherry (Mount Carmel CMC Convent).
- 19 February 1892: Foundation Stone laid for the new Bishop's House at Vedikkunnu.
- 28 July 1896: Vicariate of Ernakulam created, with territories from both Vicariates.
- 19 June 1922: Venerable Mar Thomas Kurialacherry started its first institution of higher education, St Berchmans College (SB College), on the premises of Parel St Mary's Church.
- 21 December 1923: Establishment of Syro Malabar Hierarchy with Ernakulam as the Metropolitan See
- 29 July 1956: The diocese of Changanassery made Metropolitan See
- 3 July 1962: Establishment of St. Thomas Apostolic Seminary, Vadavathoor, Kottayam.
- 3 December 1972: Establishment of archdiocese youth movement, YUVADEEPTI-KCYM
- 15 January 2003: Diocese of Idukki established.
- 15-August-2019: Honorary Doctorate for Archbishop Emeritus Mar Joseph Powathil
- 30 August 2024: Mar Thomas Tharayil has been elected as the Youngest Archbishop of Changanacherry.

== First vicar general ==
- 1889-1892 Msgr. Nidhiry Mani Kathanar

== Saints and causes for canonisation ==
- St. Alphonsa
- St. Kuriakose Elias Chavara
- Ven. Thomas Kurialacherry
- Ven. Mar Mathew Kavukattu
- Servant of God Thommachan Puthenparampil
- Servant of God Mother Mary Francisca De Chanthal (Philomena Vallayil)
- Benedict Onamkulam
