= Changanassery =

Town in Kerala, India

Changanassery Changanacherry
- Municipality
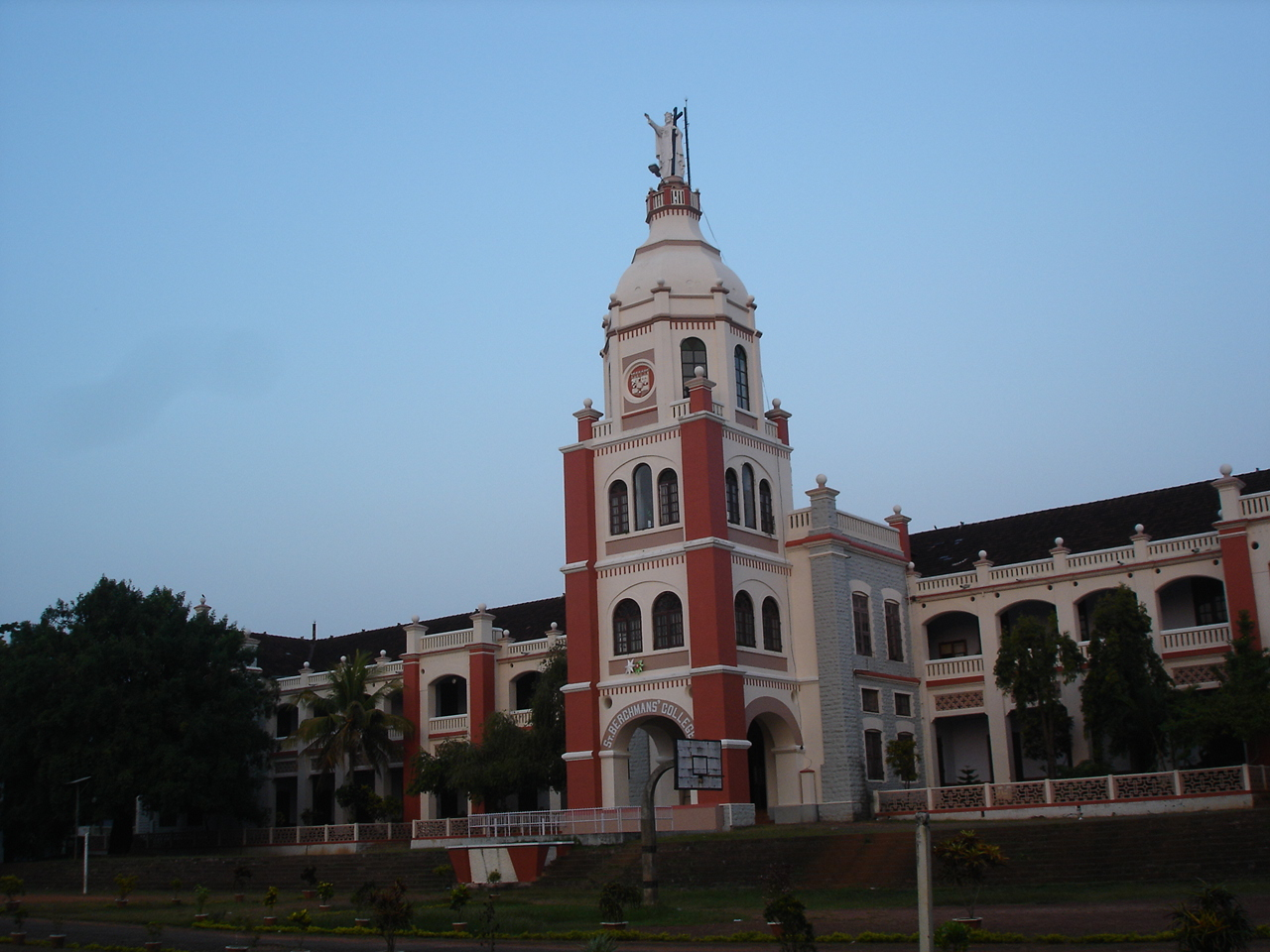
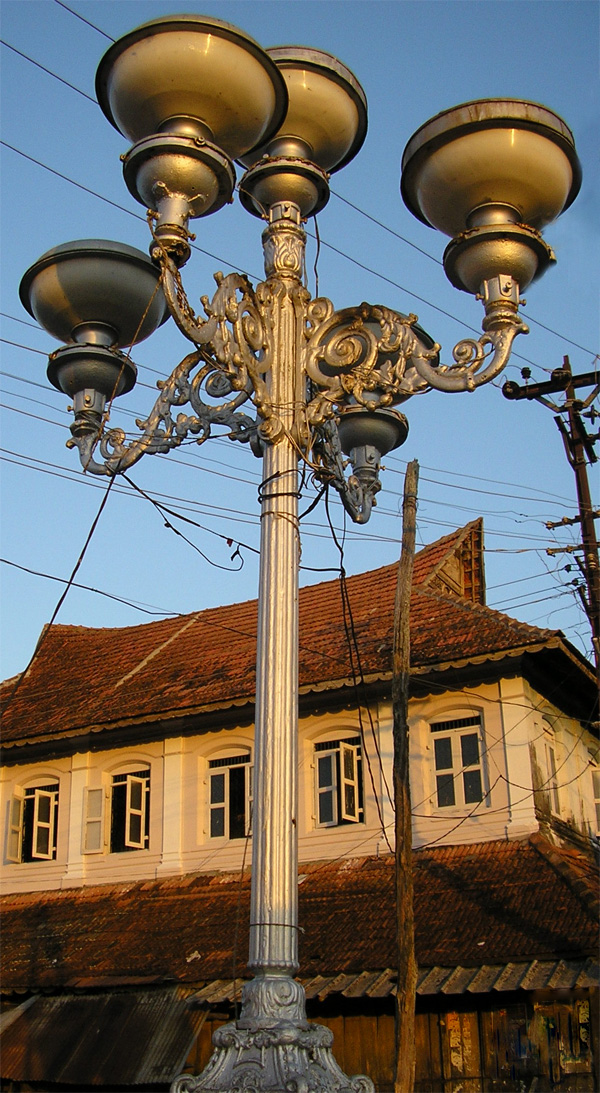
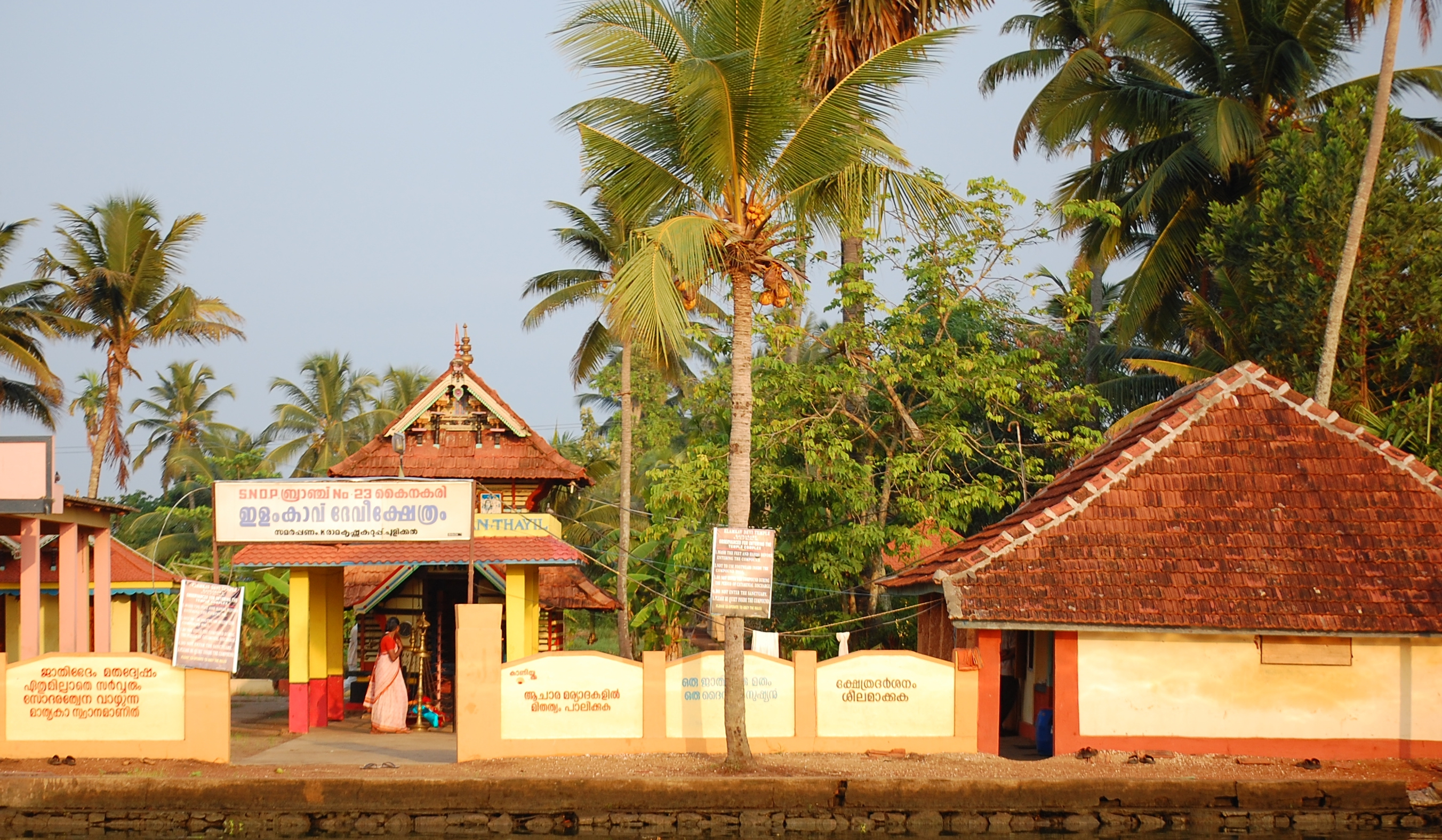
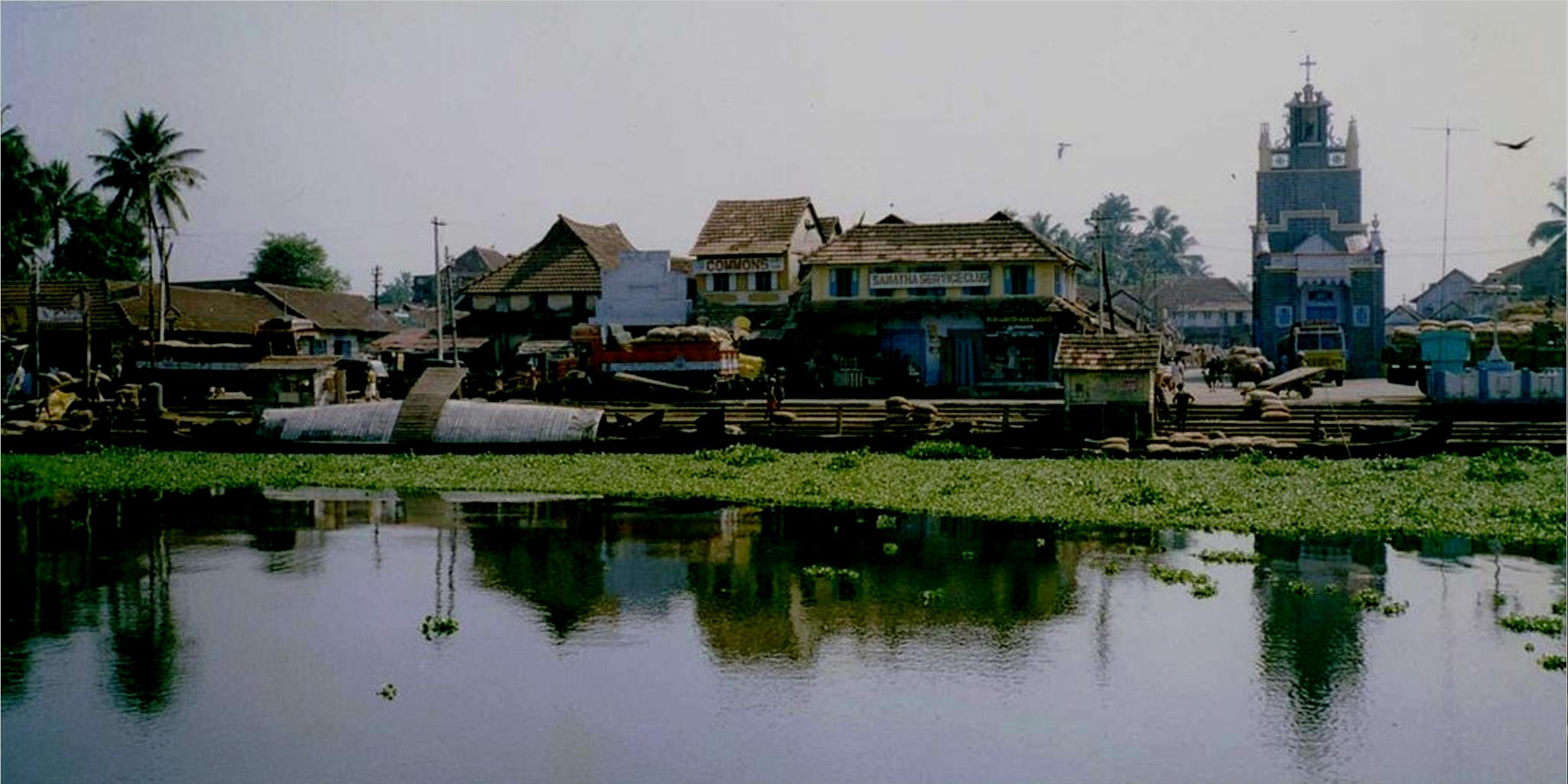
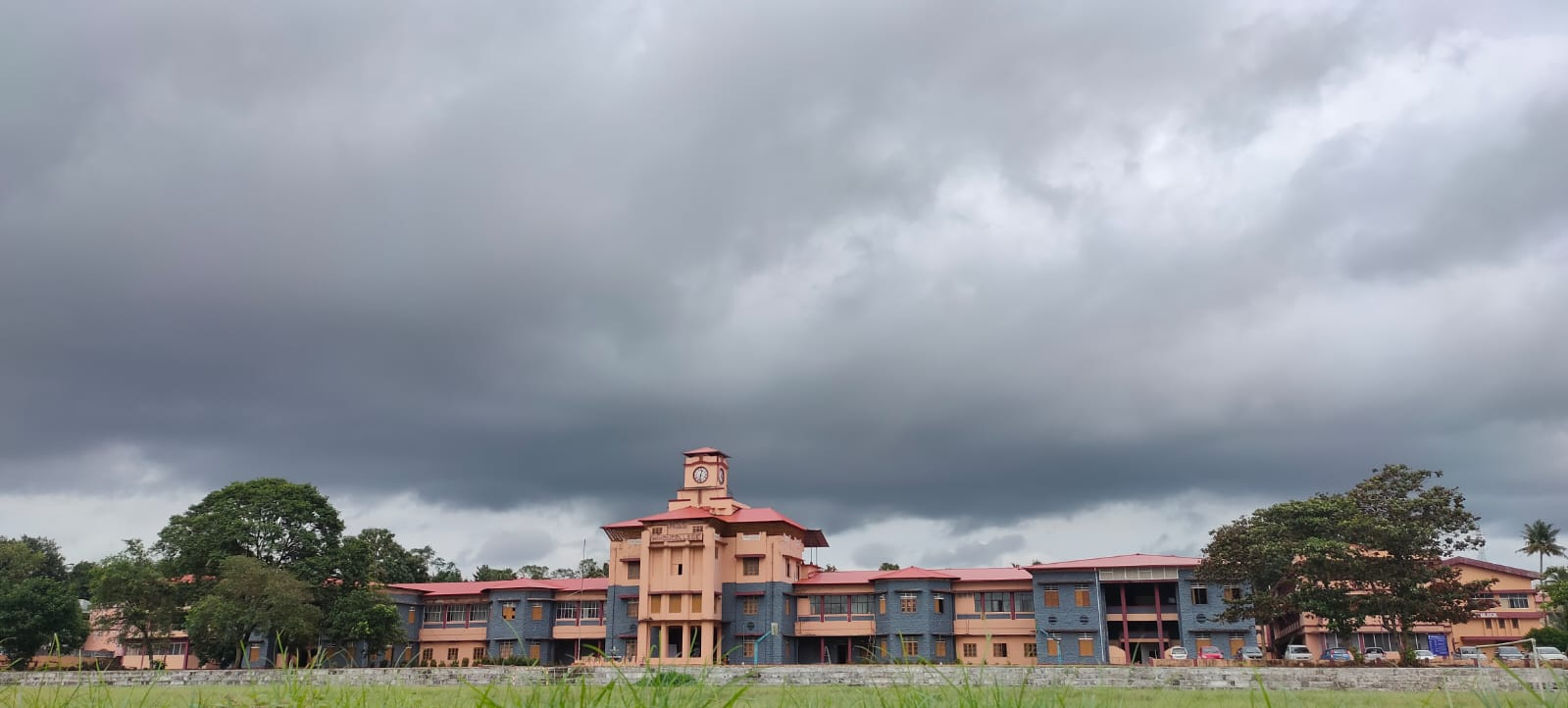
- Clockwise, top to bottom: St. Berchmans College; The Anchuviḷakku; Iḷamkavu Devi Temple; The boat jetty; NSS Hindu College

- Location within Kerala Location within India
- Coordinates: 9.466667°N 76.55°E
- Country: India
- State: Kerala
- District: Kottayam

Government
  - Body: Municipality

Area
  - Municipality: 13.5 km^{2} (5.2 sq mi)
  - Metro: 43.8 km^{2} (16.9 sq mi)
- Elevation: 11 m (36 ft)

Population (2011)
  - Municipality: 47,485
  - Density: 3,520/km^{2} (9,110/sq mi)
  - Metro: 127,987

Languages
  - Official: Malayalam, English
- Time zone: UTC+5:30 (IST)
- PIN: 686101
- Telephone code: 0481
- Vehicle registration: KL 33
- Nearest cities: Kottayam (18 km), Alappuzha (28 km)

Changanassery, (IPA: [t͡ʃɐŋːɐnaːʃeːɾi]) is a municipality in the Kottayam district of Kerala, India. It is located 17 km (10.6 mi) south of the district headquarters in Kottayam and around 115 km (71.5 mi) north of the state capital Thiruvananthapuram. As per the 2011 Indian census, Changanassery has a population of 47,485 people, and a population density of 3,517/km^{2} (9,110/sq mi).

Changanassery is an important market town, was historically one of the centres of administration and culture in the Central Travancore region. The Changanassery market, established in AD 1805, served as the main trading point in the transport of rice, pepper, dry ginger, and piece goods between the coastal areas in the west and the mountains of the east. The "Anchu Vilakku" lamps were installed by the locals in 1905 near the boat jetty, and continues to serve as a symbol of the religious and ethnic harmony of the region. Changanassery is also famous for SB College, one of the oldest and prestigious institutions established by the Catholic Church in 1922 and for providing higher education to Travancore Region in Kerala in the beginning of the 20th century. The College Tower of SB College, with Christ The King on top of it, continues to stand as symbol for wisdom and education in Kerala.

== Administration ==
The city is governed by the Changanacherry Municipal Council.Ms Beena Joby is the chairperson of the municipality and the vice chairperson Mr Mathews George.

It heads the taluk Kachery (office). It also heads the Munsiff's court and the judicial first class magistrate's court. Changanacherry assembly constituency was a part of Kottayam (Lok Sabha constituency). However, after the Delimitation Commission's Report in 2005, in order to retain the Mavelikkara Lok Sabha Constituency, Changanacherry segment in Kottayam and the neighbouring constituencies in Alappuzha and Kollam districts were put together under the Mavelikkara constituency. Sri. Kodikunnil Suresh represents the Mavelikkara constituency in Parliament and Sri. Job Michael represents Changanacherry Constituency in the Kerala Legislative Assembly now.

== Geography and climate ==
Changanassery has a tropical monsoon climate. There is significant rainfall in most months of the year. The short dry season has little effect on the overall climate. The Köppen-Geiger climate classification is Am. The temperature here averages 26.3 °C or 79.3 °F. In a year, the average rainfall is about 2,979 millimetres or 117 inches.

Climate data for Changanassery
Month	Jan	Feb	Mar	Apr	May	Jun	Jul	Aug	Sep	Oct	Nov	Dec	Year
Mean daily maximum °C (°F)	31 (88)	32.7 (90.9)	33.4 (92.1)	32.1 (89.8)	30.3 (86.5)	28.4 (83.1)	28.1 (82.6)	28.1 (82.6)	28.6 (83.5)	28.9 (84.0)	29 (84)	29.6 (85.3)	30.0 (86.0)
Mean daily minimum °C (°F)	26.3 (79.3)	27.5 (81.5)	28.4 (83.1)	27.9 (82.2)	27 (81)	25.7 (78.3)	25.3 (77.5)	25.3 (77.5)	25.6 (78.1)	25.7 (78.3)	25.7 (78.3)	25.8 (78.4)	26.4 (79.5)
Average rainfall mm (inches)	22 (0.9)	26 (1.0)	67 (2.6)	167 (6.6)	346 (13.6)	530 (20.9)	497 (19.6)	401 (15.8)	305 (12.0)	324 (12.8)	222 (8.7)	72 (2.8)	2,979 (117.3)
Source: "Changanassery Climate". Climate Data.

== Demographics ==
Historical population
Year	Pop.	±%
1901	14,264	—
1911	17,242	+20.9%
1921	18,955	+9.9%
1931	24,201	+27.7%
1941	28,381	+17.3%
1951	36,289	+27.9%
1961	42,376	+16.8%
1971	48,545	+14.6%
1981	51,955	+7.0%
1991	52,455	+1.0%
2001	51,967	−0.9%
2011	47,685	−8.2%

The Indian census collects statistics for both the Changanassery municipality and the Changanassery Urban Agglomeration (including its surrounding panchayat areas). The Changanassery UA includes Changanassery municipality as well as neighbouring panchayats like Paippad, Thrikodithanam and Chethipuzha in Vazhapilly panchayat.

As of the 2011 Indian census Changanassery municipality has a population of 47,485, an 8.2% decline from the 51,967 registered in 2001. Of this, 48.13% are male and 51.86% are female. The total population of the Changanassery UA is 127,987, of which 48.29% are male and 51.71% are female. The percentage of children below the age of 6 was 8.9% in Changanassery and 9.02% in the Changanassery UA. The literacy rate of Changanassery in 2011 was 97.19% (98.01% for males and 96.45% for females), which was higher than the state average of 94% and the national average of 74.04%. The literacy rate of the Changanassery UA in 2011 was 97.56% (98.19% for males and 96.98% for females).

=== Religion ===
Religion in Changanassery (2011)
1. Hinduism (48.0%)
2. Christianity (34.7%)
3. Islam (17.0%)
4. None (0.23%)
5. Other (0.04%)

According to the 2011 census, Hindus are the plurality, with 48% of the population adhering to the religion. Christians form a significant minority, constituting 35% of the population. Muslims constitute 17% of the population.

The headquarters of the Nair Service Society, an organization created for the social advancement and welfare of the Nair community of Hindus, is located in Perunna. Changanassery is also the center of the Archdiocese of Changanassery, one of the largest dioceses of the Syro-Malabar Catholic church in India.

== Education ==
There was a Vedic school at Vazhappally Salagramam (Vazhappally Shala) in ancient times during the rule of the Thekkumkur. It was run exclusively for Brahmins. It is the oldest educational institution in Changanassery on record. The Vazhappally Sala was destroyed by the army of Ramayyan Dalawa during the Battle of Changanassery between Thekkumkur and Travancore in 1790.

1. St Berchmans Higher Secondary School, Changanassery (1891); One of the oldest residential high schools in Kerala, (then known as) St Berchmans English High School was established by Fr Charles Lavigne and clergy of Catholic Church in 1891. Even though made for Seminarians, the school, soon, was made for public. In 1998 the High School was promoted to Higher Secondary School providing both primary and secondary education. Cardinals such as Antony Padiyara and George Alencherry and archbishops such as Joseph Powathil and Joseph Perumthottam are alumni of the school.
2. St. Berchmans College, Changanassery (19 June 1922); One of the top ten oldest colleges in Kerala, St Berchmans College was initially started in a building (now a museum) near to St. Mary's Parel Church in 1922 by Thomas Kurialacherry on the cornerstone laid by Charles Lavigne with the help of the Catholic Church and the Travancore royal family. It was a junior college affiliated to Madras University. In 1927, graduate courses were started. Travancore University was founded on 1 November 1937 to which the college was then affiliated. Postgraduate courses were started in 1957. Now it is affiliated to Mahatma Gandhi University Kottayam. St. Berchmans College situated in Changanacherry, Kottayam District, Kerala, is an independent instructive (Autonomous) organization associated to Mahatma Gandhi University, Kottayam. This establishment was established in 1922 and is perceived under the UGC Act, 1956. In the fifth pattern of accreditation in 2022, the school was evaluated at A+ by the NAAC. It was positioned 54 in All India Ranking by National Institutional Ranking Framework (NIRF) in 2022 in the class of College. The college is known for its Victorian architecture, especially the College Tower, and for its alumni such as Prem Nazir, Oommen Chandy, Thomas Tharayil and so on.
3. NSS Hindu College, Changanassery (June 1949); The college was started in the rooms provided at the N.S.S. High School and was shifted to a new building in 1955. Set up in 1947, it is licensed from UGC, NAAC, and is associated with Mahatma Gandhi University. NSS, Changanassery offers 30 courses across 5 streams specifically Vocational, Arts, Hotel Management, Science, Commerce and Banking and across 8 degrees like BA, BSc, B.Com, MA, MSc.
4. Assumption College, Changanasserry (1950); women's college. Assumption College, affiliated to University of Kerala in 1949, is at present affiliated to Mahatma Gandhi University, Kottayam. Included under section 2(f) and 12 B of the UGC Act, the College was accredited by the NAAC in the year 2000.

== Notable people ==
- Raja Raja Varma Koil Thampuran
- Mannathu Padmanabha Pillai
- Ulloor S. Parameswara Iyer
- Kerala Varma Valiya Koil Thampuran
- A. R. Raja Raja Varma
- Changanassery Parameswaran Pillai
- Kainikkara Kumara Pillai
- Accamma Cherian
- P. K. Narayana Panicker
- L. P. R. Varma
- Mar Thomas Kurialacherry
- Mar James Kalassery
- Aditya Varma Manikandan
- Mathew Kavukattu
- Muttathu Varkey
- Mar. Joseph Powathil
- Mar George Alencherry
- Mar Joseph Perumthottam
- Alummoodan
- Dr. L.A. Ravi Varma
- Mar Thomas Tharayil
- Anju Bobby George
- Raju Narayana Swamy
- Bheeman Raghu
- Boban Alummoodan
- Geethu Anna Jose
- Parvathy Omanakuttan
- Matthew Pothen Thekaekara
- Prof. T.V. Varkey
- C.F Thomas
- Roshan Mathew
- Shalu Menon

== See also ==
- Thottackad
- Palayam
- Karukachal
