= Augustine John Ukken =

Syrian Catholic priest from Kerala, India

Venerable Augustine John Ukken
- Born: 19 December 1880; Thoyyakkavu, Thrissur district, Kerala
- Died: 13 October 1956 (aged 75); Chowannur, Thrissur district, Kerala
- Venerated in: Syro-Malabar Catholic Church

Augustine John Ukken was a Syrian Catholic (Syro-Malabar Catholic) priest from the Indian state of Kerala in Thrissur and the founder of the Congregation of Sisters of Charity (CSC).

== Early life ==
Augustine John Ukken was born in Thoyyakkavu in Thrissur district on 19 December 1880 as the second son of Punnaparambil Ukken Anthappan and Chalakkal Annamma, both of whom died by the time Augustine was the age of six. The local parish priest provided the boy shelter and an education in the upper primary school. Around 1895 Bishop Adolphus Medlycott had Augustine enrolled at the Minor Seminary in Trichur to complete his education.

== As priest ==
In 1898, Ukken was sent to Kandy in Sri Lanka to study for the priesthood. He was ordained priest on 21 December 1907, by Clements Pagany, the Canty Bishop.

From 1908 to 1909 he served as Assistant Manager of the St. Thomas College, Thrissur, where he taught French and Latin. Later, he became Manager of the College from 1921–1925. He was Rector of the Minor Seminary, Thrissur from 1910 to 1917 and Secretary to John Menachery, Archbishop of Thrissur, from 1913 to 1917. Augustine also worked as parish priest in Kottapady, Lourdes Cathedral, Kandassankadavu, Mattom, Chowannur, Chiralayam, Palayur, Arthat, Anjoor, Cheroor -Vijayapuram (Founder Vicar), Eyyal, Orumanayoor, Guruvayoor, Parempadam, Vadanappilly, Vellarakad parishes.

On 21 November 1944, he founded Congregation of the Sisters of Charity with the approval of George Alapatt, Metropolitan Archbishop of Thrissur. The charism of the congregation is "caring of the sick, tending those who are in deathbed, uplifting the poor and giving catechetical formation". He died on 13 October 1956, at Chowannur in Thrissur district.

== Canonization process ==
His canonization process was started on 30 November 2007 and was declared as Servant of God by Metropolitan Archbishop of Thrissur Andrews Thazhath at the Our Lady of Lourdes Metropolitan Cathedral on 24 August 2008. On 31 August 2008, the archdiocese erected the Archdiocesan Tribunal. He was declared as Venerable by Pope Francis on 22 December 2018.

His beatification is now dependent upon the papal confirmation of a miracle attributed to his intercession.
