= Catholic Congress Global =

Catholic Congress Global (CCG)
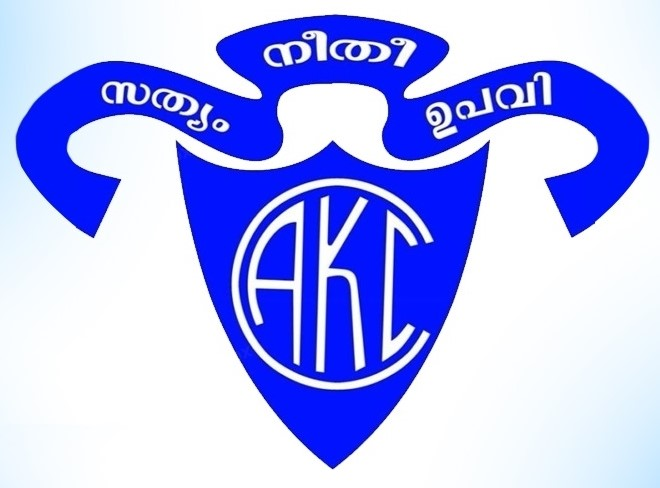
- Abbreviation: CCG
- Formation: 1918; 108 years ago
- Type: INGO
- Purpose: International umbrella organization of laity under Syro Malabar Church
- Headquarters: Kottayam, India
- President: Rajeev Kochuparambil
- General Secretary: Dr. Josekutty J. Ozhukayil
- Treasurer: Adv. Tony Punchakkunnel
- Website: catholiccongress.org

The Catholic Congress Global (Catholica Congress or Syro-Malabar Catholic Congress or CCG) is the official Community organisation of Syro-Malabar Church. Catholic Congress stands for the overall progress of the Syro-Malabar Catholic community and for the protection of civil and fundamental rights in respect to the religious, social, cultural, educational and economic aspects.

CCG, previously known as 'Keraleeya Catholica Mahajanasabha', was formed in 1918.

The patron of CCG is Mar George Cardinal Alencherry, Major Archbishop (Head) of the Syro-Malabar Church while its Bishop Legate is Mar Remigiose Inchananiyil and Global Committee Director is Fr Philip Kaviyil.

== History ==
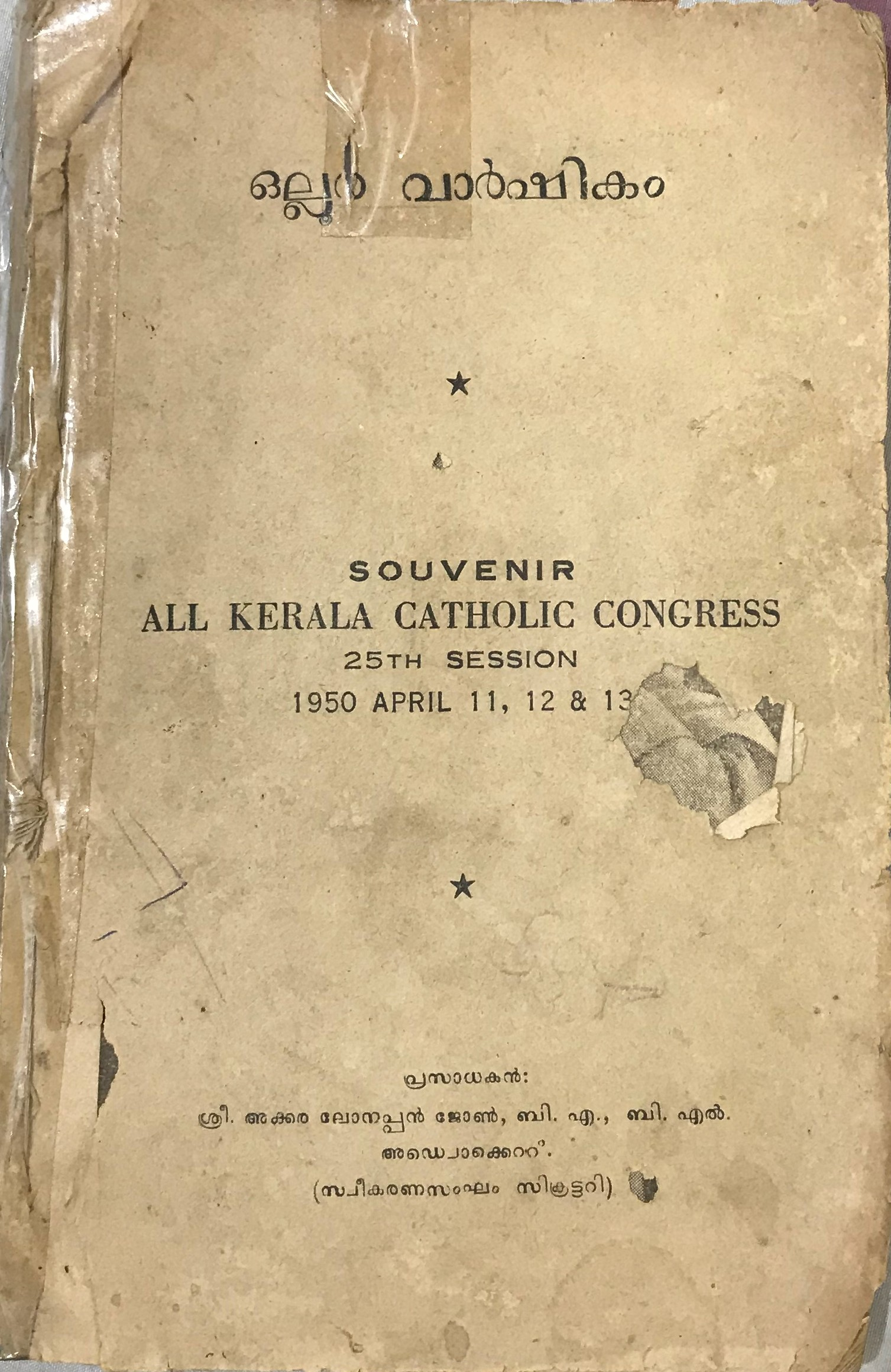
Ollur Varshikam: Souvenir of 25th session of All Kerala Catholic Congress

A meeting of members belonging to Syrian Christian community was organised in Alappuzha in 1907. The members continue to meet annually and in its eleventh meeting at Athirampuzha in 1917, they decided to form a community welfare organization.

Subsequently, on April 30, 1918, Keraleeya Catholica Mahajanasabha was formed. Mar Aloysius Pazheparambil was the first president. It adopted the name All Kerala Catholic Congress, in 1931. Later in 2017, the organisation adopted the name Catholic Congress Global.

CCG opposed the nationalisation of private schools put forward by C. P. Ramaswami Iyer. CCG cooperated with the Travancore State Congress in the protest. CCG was in the forefront of Vimochana Samaram, which led to the dissolution of the First Namboodiripad ministry in 1957.

== Annual meetings ==
The annual meetings of the organisation are listed below.

=== Community meetings ===
Year	Place	President
1907	Alappuzha	Sri Cyriac Nidheeri
1908	Pulinkunnoo	I.C. Chacko
1909	Champakulam	J John Nidheeri
1910	Edathua	C. Anthappai
1911	Pala	V.D. Ouseph
1912	Njarackal	C.V. Antony
1913	Thrissur	I.C. Chacko
1914	Irinjalakuda	Cyriac Nidheeri
1915	Ollur	Joseph Thaliath
1916	Kuravilangad	Fr John Palocaren
1917	Athirampuzha	C. Anthappai

=== ‘Keraleeya Catholica Mahashabha’ meetings ===
Year	Place	President
1918	Changanassery	Dr Thomas Kurialacherry
1919	Ernakulam	Mar Aloysius Pazheparambil
1920	Aluva	C. Anthappai
1921	Bri Kochi	Fr Cruze
1923	Alappuzha	Dr Alexander Chulaparambil
1924	Thathampally	Msgr Antony Puthussery
1925	Thrissur	Dr Francis Vazhapilly
1926	Panapalli	Fr John Palocaren
1927	Pala	Chev. Thariathu Kunjithomman
1929	Athirampuzha	Dr James Kalacherry

=== All Kerala Catholic Congress meetings ===
Year	Place	President
1930	Cherthala	Dewan Bahadur Arogyaswami Muthaliar
1931	Muvattupuzha	Mar Ivanios
1932	Champakkulam	Sri George Joseph
1933	Ernakulam	T.J. Mathew
1934	Alappuzha	Francis Xavier D'souza
1935	Edathua	C.V. Antony
1936	Chittattukara	Dr Francis Tiburtius Roche
1942	Kainakary	Dr P.J. Thomas
1943	Pala	I.C. Chacko
1945	Kanjirappally	Dr Leo Proserpio S.J.
1946	Athirampuzha	Chev. Thariathu Kunjithomman
1947	Ernakulam	C.A. Ouseph
1948	Thathampally	Chev. Joseph Thaliath
1949	Pala (Special session)	(For passing resolution)
1949	Ramapuram	Chev. Joseph Thaliath
1950	Ollur	E.P. Varghese

The centenary meeting of CCG was held at Thrissur during 11–14 May 2018 and it was inaugurated by Cardinal George Alenchery. The slogan of the centenary conference was 'Secularism for the progress of the country’.

First Global Meet of Catholic Congress was held at the Meydan Hotel, Dubai during 30 September - 1 October 2019, which was part of 101st meeting of the organisation. 300 delegates from 26 countries participated in the Meet.
