= John Berchmans =

Belgian Jesuit saint (1599–1621)

Saint John Berchmans SJ

Jesuit Scholastic and Saint
- Born: 13 March 1599; Diest, Seventeen Provinces (now Diest, Belgium)
- Died: 13 August 1621 (aged 22); Rome, Papal States
- Venerated in: Catholic Church
- Beatified: 28 May 1865
- Canonized: 15 January 1888
- Major shrine: Sant'Ignazio
- Feast: 26 November (after 1969); 13 August (until 1969)
- Attributes: Often depicted with hands clasped, holding his crucifix, his book of rules, and his rosary.
- Patronage: Ateneo de Manila University; Ateneo de Naga University; Ateneo de Davao University; Ateneo de Zamboanga University; SB College Changanasserry, Kerala, India; Sacred Heart School - Ateneo de Cebu; Xavier University - Ateneo de Cagayan

John Berchmans, SJ (Dutch: Jan Berchmans [jɑm ˈbɛr(ə)xmɑns]; 13 March 1599 – 13 August 1621) was a Belgian Jesuit scholastic and is revered as a saint in the Catholic Church.

In 1615, the Jesuits opened a college at Mechelen, Belgium and Berchmans was one of the first to enroll. His spiritual model was his fellow Jesuit Aloysius Gonzaga, and he was influenced by the example of the English Jesuit martyrs. Berchmans is the patron saint of altar servers, Jesuit scholastics, and students.

== Early life ==
John Berchmans was born on 13 March 1599, in the city of Diest situated in what is now the Belgian province of Flemish Brabant, the son of a shoemaker. His parents were John Charles and Elizabeth Berchmans. He was the oldest of five children and at baptism was named John in honor of John the Baptist. He grew up in an atmosphere of political turmoil caused by a religious war between the Catholic and Protestant parts of the Low Countries.

When he was age nine years old, his mother was stricken with a very long and a very serious illness. John would pass several hours each day by her bedside. He studied at the Gymnasium (grammar school) at Diest and worked as a servant in the household of Canon John Froymont at Mechelen in order to continue his studies. John also made pilgrimages to the Marian shrine of Scherpenheuvel, some 30 miles east of Brussels, but only few miles from Diest.

== Life in the Society of Jesus ==
In 1615, the Jesuits opened a college at Mechelen and Berchmans was one of the first to enroll. Immediately upon entering, he enrolled in the Sodality of the Blessed Virgin. When Berchmans wrote his parents that he wished to join the Society of Jesus, his father hurried to Mechelen to dissuade him and sent him to the Franciscan convent in Mechelen. At the convent, a friar who was related to Berchmans also attempted to change his mind. Finally as a last resort, Berchmans's father told him that he would end all financial support if he continued with his plan.

Nevertheless, on 24 September 1616, Berchmans entered the Jesuit novitiate. He was affable, kind, and endowed with an outgoing personality that endeared him to others. He requested that after ordination as a priest he could become a chaplain in the army, hoping to be martyred on the battlefield.

On 24 January 1618, he made his first vows and went to Antwerp to begin studying philosophy. After only a few weeks he was sent to Rome, where he was to continue the same study. He set out on foot, with his belongings on his back, and on arrival was admitted to the Roman College to begin two years of study. He entered his third-year class in philosophy in the year 1621.

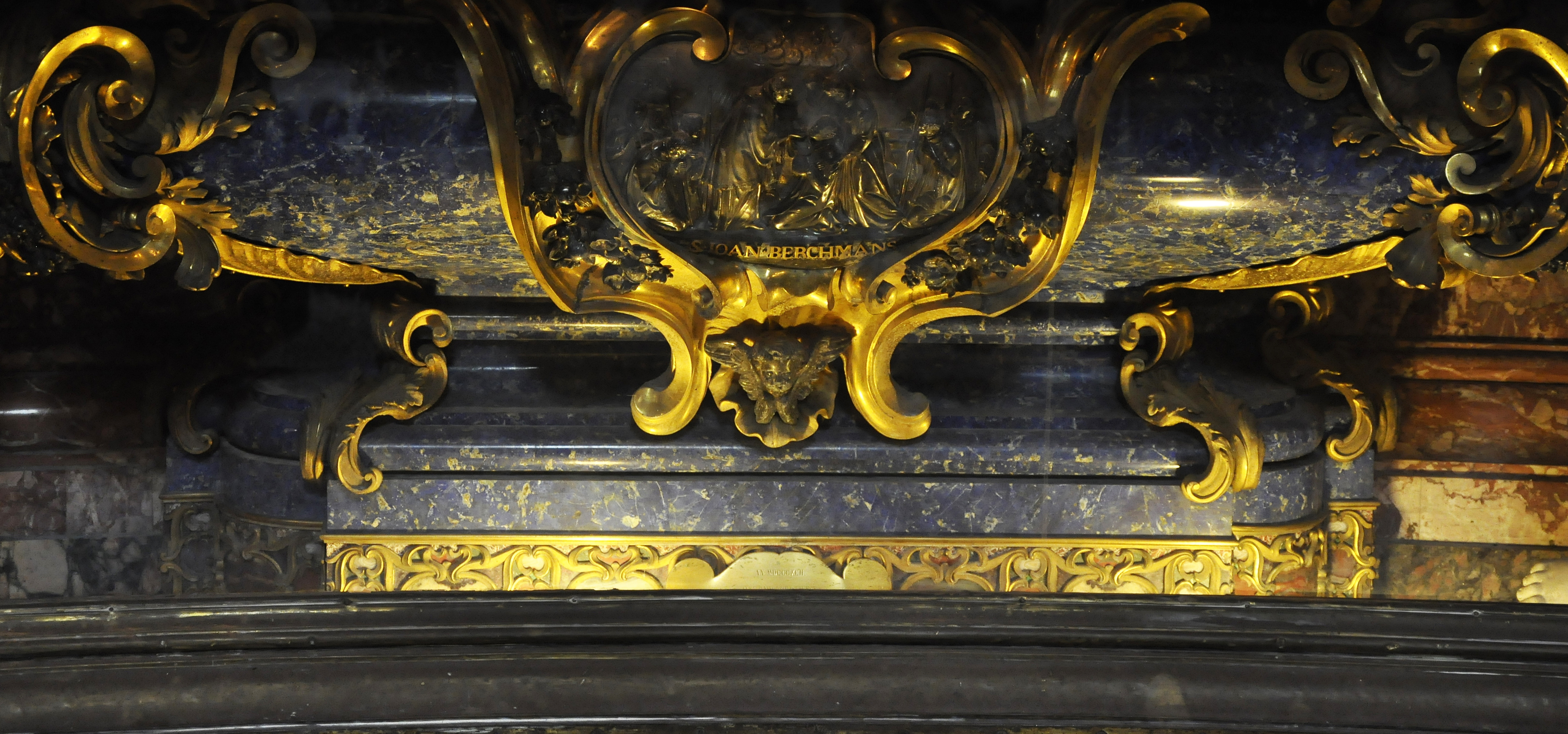
His grave at the Sant'Ignazio

Later, in August 1621, the prefect of studies selected Berchmans to participate in a discussion of philosophy at the Greek College, which at the time was administered by the Dominicans. Berchmans opened the discussion with great clarity and profoundness, but after returning to his own quarters, was seized with Roman fever. His lungs became inflamed and his strength diminished rapidly. He succumbed to dysentery and fever on 13 August 1621, at the age of 22 years and five months. When he died, a large crowd gathered for several days to view his remains and to invoke his intercession. That same year, Phillip-Charles, Duke of Aarschot, sent a petition to Pope Gregory XV with a view to beginning the process leading to Berchman's beatification. His remains were eventually entombed in Rome's Sant'Ignazio Church.

== Spirituality ==
Berchmans took as his spiritual model his fellow Jesuit Aloysius Gonzaga and was also influenced by the example of the English Jesuit martyrs. It was his realistic appreciation for the value of ordinary things, a characteristic of the Flemish mystical tradition, that constituted his holiness. He had a special devotion to Mary, mother of Jesus, and to him is owed the Little Rosary of the Immaculate Conception.

== Veneration ==
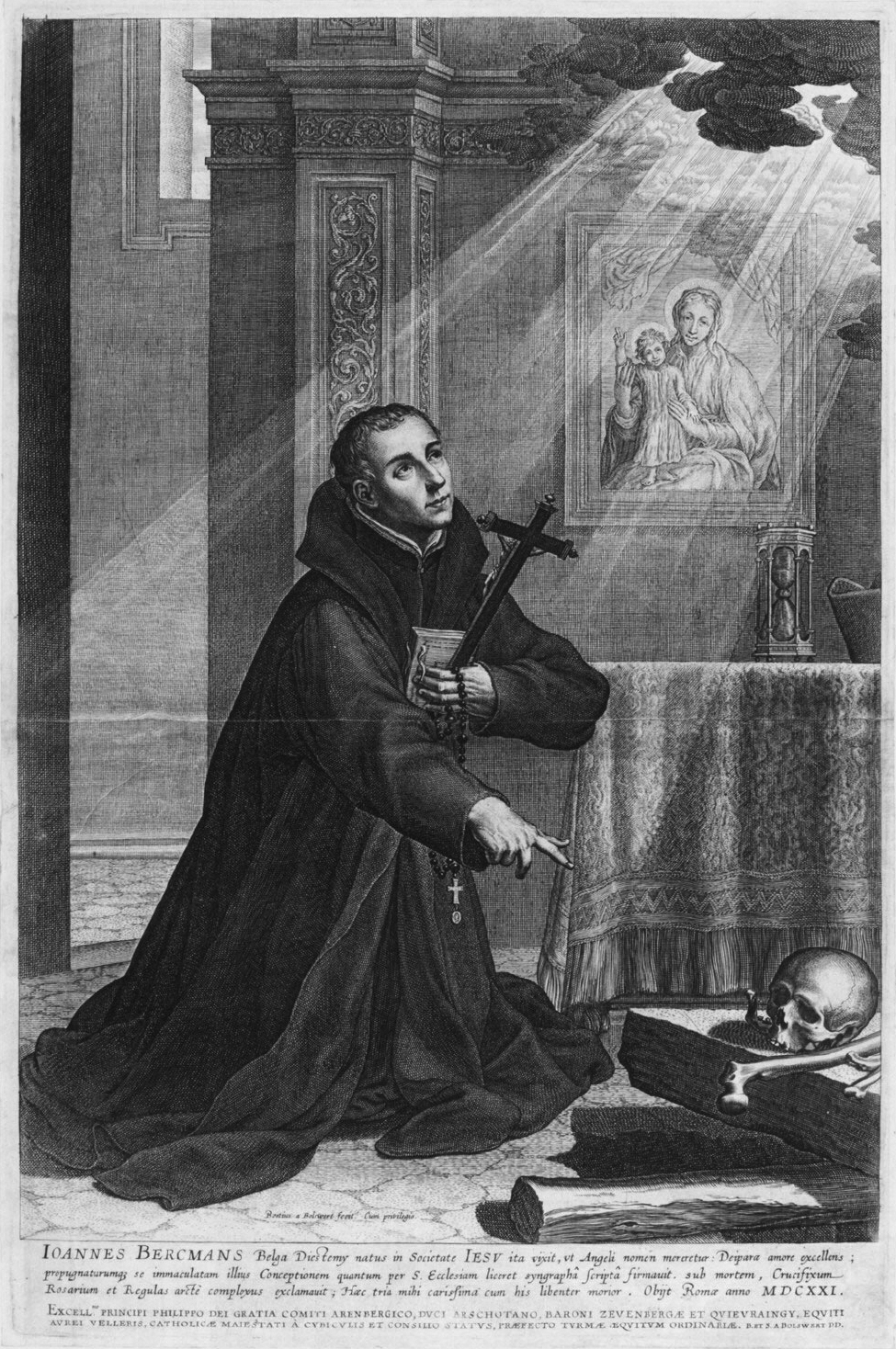

At the time of Berchmans's death, his heart was returned to his homeland in Belgium where it is kept in a silver reliquary on a side altar in the church at Leuven (Louvain). Berchmans was declared Blessed in 1865, and canonized in 1888. Statues frequently depict him with hands clasped, holding his crucifix, his book of rules, and his rosary.

The miracle that led to his canonization occurred at the Academy of the Sacred Heart in Grand Coteau, Louisiana. In 1866, one year after the Civil War, he appeared to novice Mary Wilson. Mary's health was poor, and her parents thought that the gentler climate of south Louisiana could be a remedy. However, her health continued to decline, to the point where for about 40 days she had only been able to take liquids. "Being unable to speak, I said in my heart: 'Lord, Thou Who seest how I suffer, if it be for your honor and glory and the salvation of my soul, I ask through the intercession of Blessed Berchmans a little relief and health. Otherwise give me patience to the end.'" She went on to describe how John Berchmans then appeared to her, and she was immediately healed. When the Academy opened a boys school in 2006, the trustees named it St. John Berchmans School. It is the only shrine at the exact location of a confirmed miracle in the United States.

The feast day of John Berchmans has never been inscribed in the General Roman Calendar, but prior to the liturgical reforms of Pope John XXIII there was a Mass set for him among the section of Masses for Various Places (Missae pro aliquibus locis) of the Roman Missal which foresaw that it would be celebrated in different places on either 13 August or 26 November. Berchmans is currently inscribed in the 2004 official edition of the Catholic Church's Martyrologium Romanum (p. 451) on 13 August, the date of his death. He is celebrated by the Society of Jesus on 26 November.

== Recognition ==
The Belgium Post Authority issued a philatelic stamp in 1965 featuring John Berchmans pictured alongside his parental home in Diest.

The St. John Berchmans Sanctuary Society is an organization for altar servers that continues to have chapters at many parishes.

San Antonio, Texas, became home to several Belgian farmers who arrived in the late 1800s and established truck farms on the southwest edge of the city and brought their crops to the city markets for sale. Other Belgians followed in the 1890s and also established farms in the area. The community founded a school in a one-room structure that also served as a chapel when the priest from Sacred Heart Parish visited. The chapel became known as St. John Berchmans and was the Belgian national parish until 1947, and was Flemish-speaking. The parish moved in 1948, and the former structure became home to the Belgian-American Club of Texas.

In 1902, Bishop Anthony Durier requested that the Jesuits establish a second parish in Shreveport. They named the parish in honor of the saint because of the miracle experienced by Mary Wilson in nearby Grand Coteau, Louisiana. On 16 June 1986, Pope John Paul II established the Diocese of Shreveport and St. John Berchmans Church became the Cathedral. One of the famous catholic instituitions in the name of the saint is SB College Changanassery, Kerala in India founded by Venerable Mar Thomas Kurialacherry in 1922 on the cornerstone laid by the French Jesuit priest, Mar Charles Lavigne who had the wish to provide higher education for the commoners in Travancore region of Kerala. Mar Charles Lavigne, with the help of clergies and Holy See of Catholic Church, started reforming the primary education by building one of its first English High School, in the early 1890s in Kerala, dedicating it to the saint of students, youths and altar boys, St. John Berchmans, SB English High School Changanasserry, Kerala in India. Even though started for seminarians, very soon it opened its gates to commoners Today the college is a premier and is one of the few reputed Catholic Institutions in the country. The college is the only college in India that has produced three alumni who are Cardinals in the Catholic Church, the senior most church official below the rank of Pope.

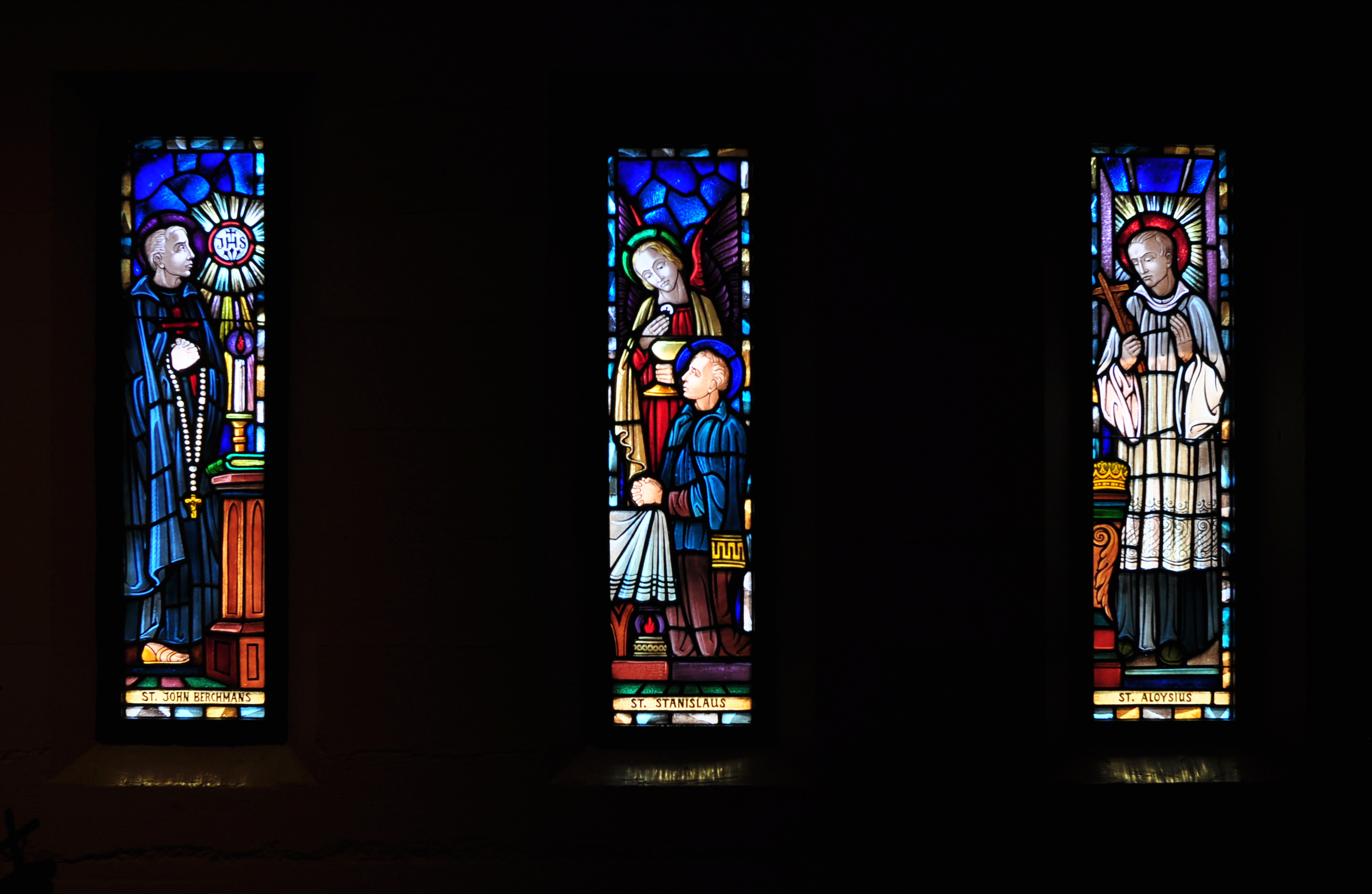
John Berchmans on a stained glass in St. Joseph's Church, Seattle

The following is a partial list of schools and churches named in honor of the saint:

- St. John Berchmans College (Brussels, Belgium)
- St. Berchmans College (Changanacherry, Kottayam)
- St. John Berchmans College (Antwerp, Belgium) (page on the Dutch Wikipedia)
- St. John Berchmans College (Diest, Belgium)
- St. John Berchmans Institute(Puurs-Sint-Amands, Belgium)
- St. John Berchmans College (Westmalle, Belgium) (page on the Dutch Wikipedia)
- St. John Berchmans College (Genk, Belgium) (page on the Dutch Wikipedia)
- St. John Berchmans College (Avelgem, Belgium) (page on the Dutch Wikipedia)
- St. John Berchmans College (Mol, Belgium)
- St. John Berchmans Institute (Zonhoven, Belgium) (page on the Dutch Wikipedia)
- St John's Beaumont School (Old Windsor, Berkshire, England)
- St. John's High School (Purulia Road, Ranchi, Jharkhand, India)
- St. John Berchmans High School (Tinpahar, Jharkhand, India)
- St. John Berchmans High School (Cordon, Isabela, Philippines)
- Cathedral of St. John Berchmans (Shreveport, Louisiana, USA)
- St. John Berchmans Catholic Church (Cankton, Louisiana, USA)
- St. John's Jesuit High School and Academy (Toledo, Ohio)
- St. John Berchmans School (Colegio San Juan Berchmans) (Cali, Colombia)
- St. John's College (Belize City, Belize)
- St. Berchmans Higher Secondary School (Changanacherry, Kottayam)
- St. John Berchmans Church, attached to the Collège St Michel (Brussels, Belgium)
- St. John Berchmans Parish and School (Logan Square, Chicago, Illinois)
- St. John Berchmans Church (Holland, Manitoba, Canada)
- Église Saint-Jean-Berchmans (Montreal, Quebec, Canada)
- Berchmans Illam, Jesuit Scholasticate (Chennai, Tamil Nadu, India)
- Sint Joan Berchmans mavo (Roosendaal, The Netherlands)
- Saint John Berchmans Academy of the Sacred Heart (Grand Coteau, Louisiana, USA)
- St. John Berchman Church, (Kurseong, West Bengal, India)
- Church of Saint Mary Immaculate and Saint John Berchmans 'al Tiburtino', (Roma, Italy) Via dei Sabelli, 00185 Roma RM, Italy
- St. Johannes Berchmans School, (PIK 2, Tangerang, Indonesia)

== See also ==
- Saint John Berchmans, patron saint archive

== Sources ==
- Holweck, F. G.: A Biographical Dictionary of the Saints. St. Louis, MO: B. Herder Book Co., 1924.
- Hippolyte Delehaye: St John Berchmans, New-York, Benzinger Brothers, 1921, 189pp.
