= Aloysius Pazheparambil =

Catholic priest (1847–1919)

His Grace Mar Aloysius Pazheparambil
- Vicar Apostolic of Ernakulam
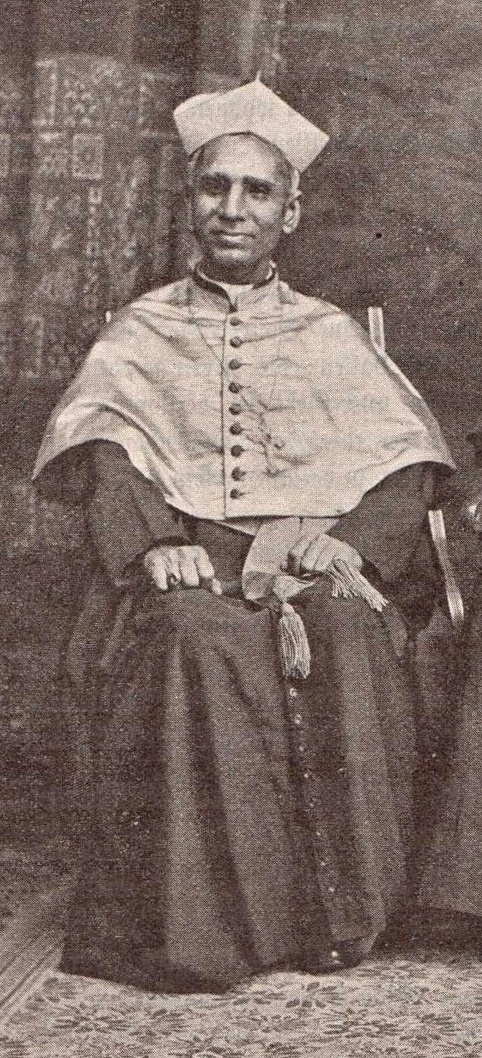
- Diocese: Ernakulam-Angamaly
- Installed: 11 August 1896
- Term ended: 1919
- Predecessor: none
- Successor: Augustine Kandathil

Orders
- Ordination: 4 December 1870

Personal details
- Born: Aloysius; 25 March 1847 Pulinkunnoo
- Died: 9 December 1919 (aged 72) Ernakulam

Mar Aloysius (Louis) Pazheparambil (25 March 1847 in Pulinkunnoo – 9 December 1919 in Ernakulam) was the Vicar Apostolic of Ernakulam in the Syro-Malabar Catholic Church. Originally a monk of the Syrian Carmelites, he was expelled along with nine others in 1875 from the religious order by the local bishop for writing to the Pope asking for an Indian bishop to rule his church. Later in 1896, he became one of three Indian bishops appointed to rule over the three Vicariates Apostolic in his church.

== Early life and ordination ==
Aloysius Pazheparambil was born in Pulinkunnoo at Alleppey and joined the Carmelite order for Catholic Syrians in 1860.

At that time, the local Catholic Thomas Christians were under the authority of a Latin Church bishop. There were constant quarrels, because these Latin bishops had little understanding of the Thomas Christians. The Thomas Catholics eventually began agitating for their own bishop.

Against this backdrop and to avoid such harmful future developments, a group of monks asked for a native bishop. Priest Aloysius Pazheparambil was the head and spokesman of this group and for his actions was, in 1875, expelled from the Carmelite order along with the others by Leonardo Mellano, the Apostolic Vicar of Verapoly.

Pope Leo XIII soon intervened, and in 1887 dissolved the episcopal structure then present and designated for them the Apostolic Vicariates of Trichur and Kottayam, headed by the Latin bishops Adolph Edwin Medlycott and Charles Lavigne. Both were respectful to the Thomas Christians and their rite, and with an open mind prepared the transition to local bishops. This finally happened in 1896 when Medlycott and Lavigne resigned from their Vicariates and the Pope reorganized the Vicariates to create Vicariate of Ernakulam. In that year came the first Syro-Malabar titular bishops, elevated as Vicars Apostolics to the dioceses. One of them, the Vicar Apostolic of Ernakulam, was Pazheparambil.

== Bishop and Vicar Apostolic ==
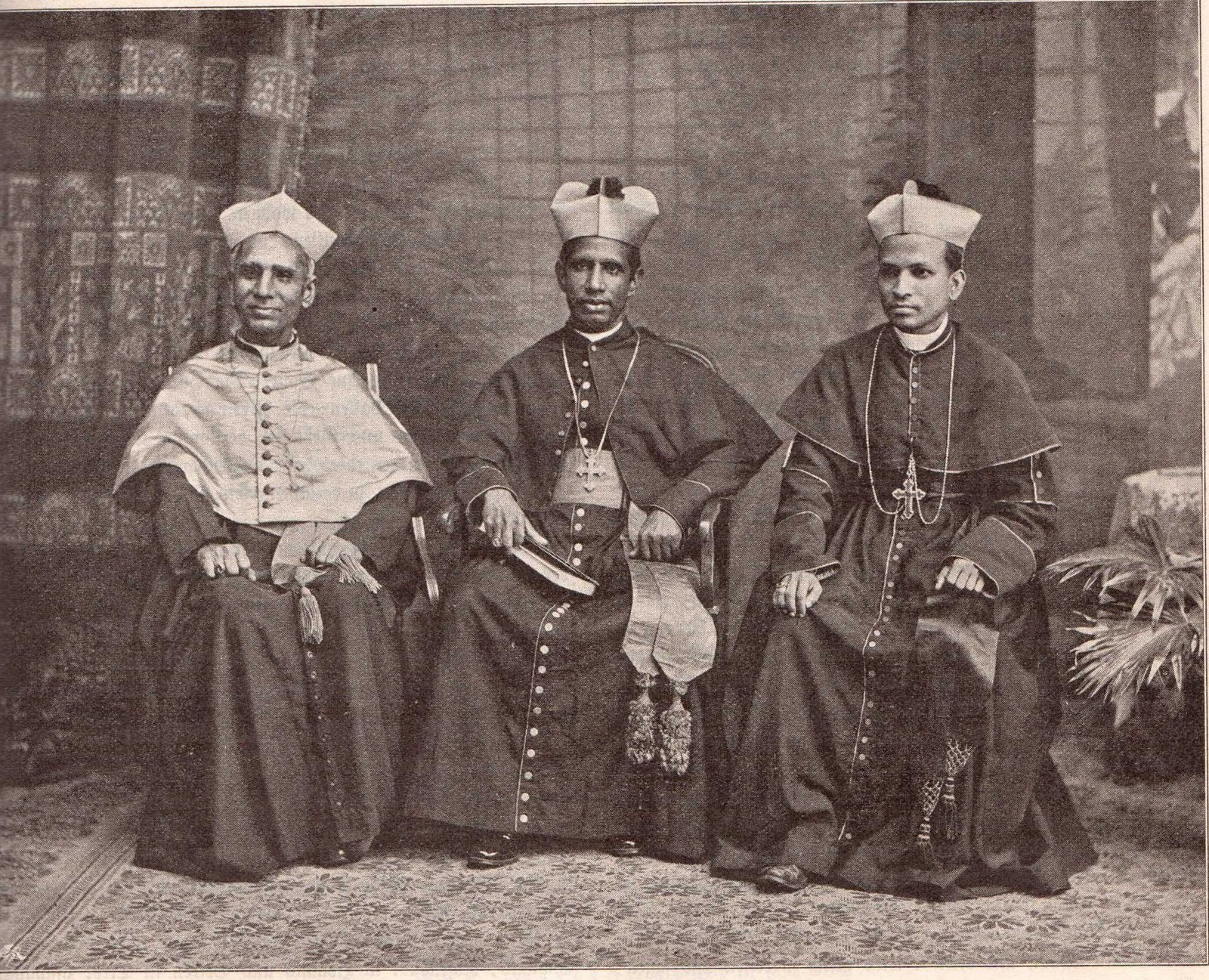
The three new Catholic Apostolic Vicars of. Thomas Christians in India, 1896. From left: Aloysius Pazheparambil, Mathew Makil, John Menachery

Aloysius Pazheparambil was one of the closest collaborators of the bishops Medlycott Adolph Edwin and Charles Lavigne. On 11 August 1896. he was made the titular bishop of Tymandus and Vicar Apostolic of the new diocese of Ernakulam. He was also made the Apostolic Delegate of India by Archbishop Ladislaus Zaleski on 25 October of that year, at his residence in Kandy (Sri Lanka). On 5 November 1896, Pazheparambil began the governing of his diocese, which he managed with great skill and zeal until his death in 1919. He was given the task of building all new diocesan structures as well as being tasked with allowing the native rite, after centuries of oppression, to unfold again.

His epitaph, written by his episcopal successor Augustine Kandathil, reads:

A Prelate specially devoted to the Blessed Virgin, simple in ways, frugal in habits, ever devoted to the interests of his Rite and Nation, steadfast of purpose, yet tactful in action, a scholar, a linguist, a historian, and a diplomat, he was a great Indian.

== Notes ==
Catholic Church titles
Preceded by none	Bishop of Ernakulam; Later Archbishop of Ernakulam; 1896–1919	Succeeded by Mar Augustine Kandathil
