= Matthew Makil =

Indian Catholic bishop (1851–1914)

Venerable Mathew Makil
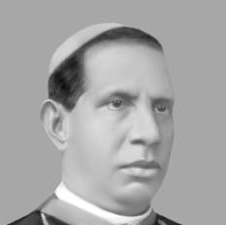
- Church: Catholic
- Appointed: 30 August 1911
- Term ended: 26 January 1914
- Predecessor: Post established
- Successor: Alexander Chulaparambil
- Previous posts: Vicar Apostolic of Changanacherry (1896-1911); Vicar General of Kottayam Apostolic Vicariate (Changanassery)

Personal details
- Born: Mathai; 27 March 1851 Manjoor, Travancore
- Died: 26 January 1914 (aged 62) Kottayam, Travancore
- Buried: St George Edacat Knanaya church, Kottayam
- Denomination: Catholic
- Residence: Manjoor
- Parents: Thomman and Anna
- Occupation: Catholic bishop
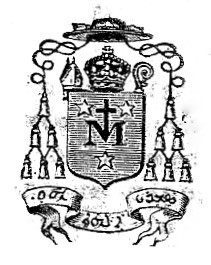
- Coat of arms
Mar Matthew Makil
- Vicar Apostolic of Changanassery
- Appointed: 11 August 1896
- Installed: 11 August 1896
- Term ended: 30 August 1911
- Predecessor: Charles Lavigne
- Successor: Thomas Kurialachery
Orders
- Ordination: 30 May 1874 by Leonard Mellano, OCD
- Consecration: 1892 by Archbishop Wladyslaw Michal Zaleski

Mathew Makil (27 March 1851 – 26 January 1914) was the second Vicar Apostolic and the first indigenous Vicar Apostolic of the Vicariate of Changanacherry, which is the Syro Malabar Archeparchy of Changanacherry today. Mathew Makil was also the first Vicar Apostolic of the Vicariate of Kottayam, which is the Knanaya Catholic Archeparchy of Kottayam today. In 1896, he became the Vicar Apostolic of the Vicariate of Changanacherry, and in 1911, when a new Vicariate Apostolic of Kottayam was constituted exclusively for the Knanaya Catholics, Mathew Makil was transferred to Kottayam as its first Vicar Apostolic. He died at Kottayam on 26 January 1914, and was declared a Servant of God on 26 January 2009 by Pope Benedict XVI, and Venerable on 22 May 2025 with the approval of Pope Leo XIV.

== Early life ==
He was born as the third son of Thomman and Anna, at Makil Puthenpurayil house in Manjoor, Travancore now a part of Kerala.

After primary education, he studied Syriac language at Mannanam. Then he joined Puthenpally Seminary that was common for Latin and Syrian priestly formation. He was trained under the rector and future co-adjutor Bishop of Verapoly Marcelinus Berarthi OCD. The Vicar Apostolic of Verapoly, Leonard Mellano of St. Louis, OCD, ordained him as priest on 30 May 1874 at the age of 23. His first Holy Mass was offered on 8 June 1874.

== Priestly ministry ==
=== Professor and vicar ===
Fr. Makil's first assignment was to teach Syriac language for two years in the same seminary where he had studied. Then he was made vicar of his home parish at Kaipuzha. Later, he served as vicar of Edacat parish at Kottayam, and then transferred back again as vicar of Kaipuzha church. Co-adjutor Bishop of Verapoly Marcelinus Berarthi OCD, who was his former seminary rector assigned him as his secretary in 1885. Makil received the appointment order on 25 December 1885 and took charge on 1 March 1886. He continued his service until the establishment of the Vicariate of Kottayam with Charles Lavigne as the Vicar Apostolic.

The Syrian Catholics were part of the Diocese of Kodungalloor and Vicariate of Verapoly along with the Latin Catholics. They had been writing to the pope requesting to establish. Honoring this request, Pope Leo XIII separated the Syrians from the Diocese of Kodungalloor and Vicariate of Verapoly that were governed by the Carmelite missionaries and established the Syrian Vicariates of Kottayam and Trichur on 20 May 1887. The Vicariate of Kottayam was entrusted to Msgr. Charles Lavigne, a Jesuit missionary from France. This Vicar Apostolic appointed Fr. Mathew Makil as the Latin professor at a seminary with school he established at Brhmamangalam for the Southists. During that time, Mathew Makil was vicar of Kaduthuruthy and Brhmamangalam churches.

=== Vicar General ===
According to the instruction from the Vatican through the Apostolic Delegate on 6 May 1889, Bishop Charles Lavigne appointed Fr. Mathew Makil as Vicar General for the Southists on 8 September 1889, on the feast of the birth of the Blessed Virgin Mary. He had some privileges including dressing like a bishop, right to offer Pontifical Mass, administer the Sacrament of Confirmation, and giving minor orders for seminarians. Fr. Mathew offered his first Pontifical Mass at Kaduthuruthy church during the Three Day Fast observance in January 1890. The occasion was honored with the presence of Bishop Charles Lavigne and Co-adjutor Bishop of Verapoly Marcelinus Berarthi OCD

== Episcopal service ==
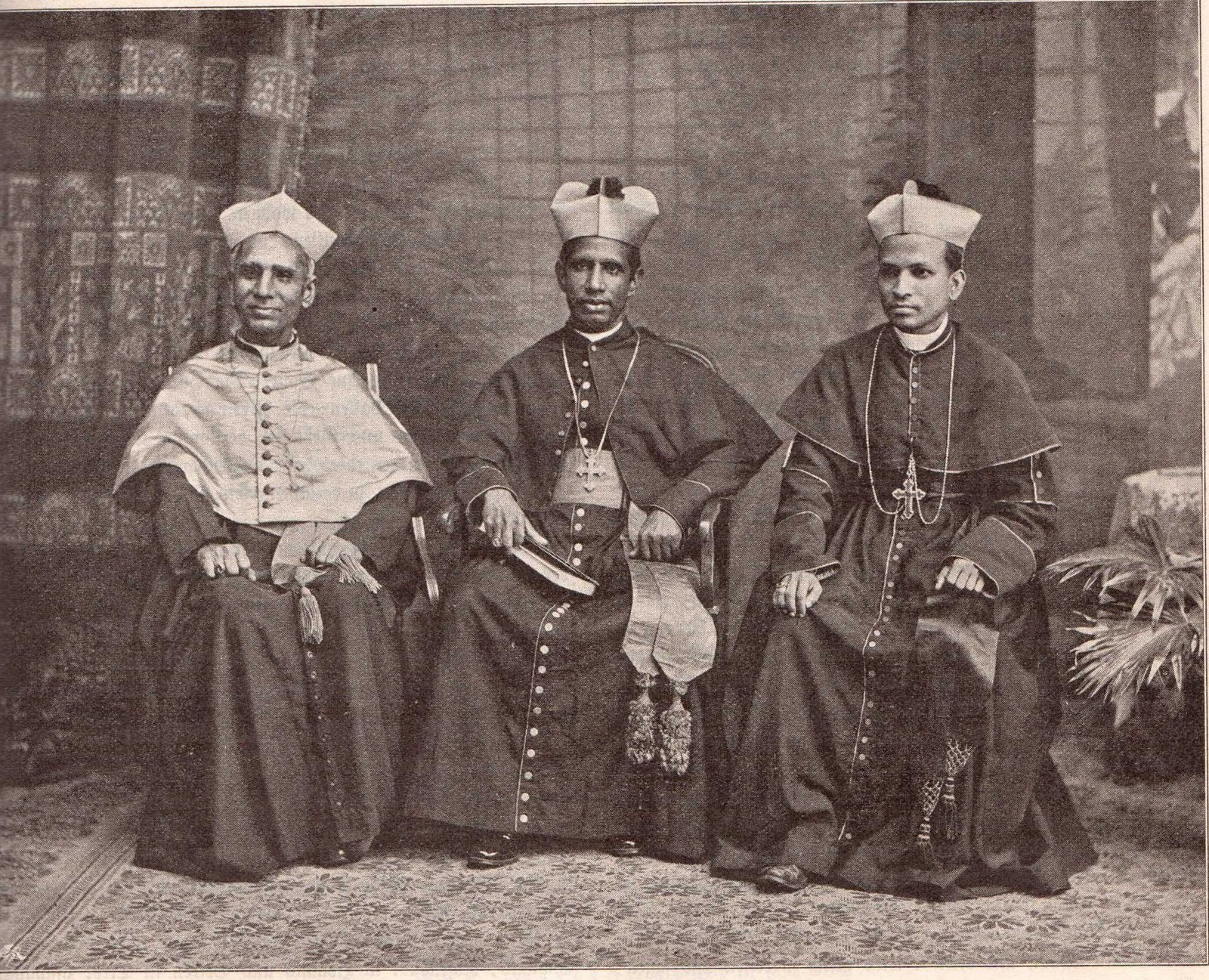
The three new Catholic Apostolic Vicars of. Thomas Christians in India, 1896. From left: Aloysius Pazheparambil, Mathew Makil, John Menachery

=== Vicar Apostolic of Changanacherry ===
Based on the recommendation of the Apostolic Vicars of Kottayam and Trichur, the Holy See reconstituted the two vicariates as three with local priests as bishops. The Vicar General for the Southists Mar Mathew Makil was appointed on 28 July 1896 as the Apostolic Vicar for Changanacherry. The other vicariates were Ernakulam and Trichur with Mar Aloysius Pazheparambil and Mar John Menachery as Apostolic Vicars. Fr. Mathew Makil received his appointment order as Vicar Apostolic of Changanacherry on 21 September 1896, on the feast day of his patron saint. The Episcopal ordination of the three Apostolic Vicars were done at Cathedral in Kandy, Ceylon on 25 October 1896 by the Delegate Apostolic of East Indies Ladislao Michele Zaleski who had his headquarters in Kandy.

The Catholic population of the Vicariate of Changanacherry when Mar Makil took charge was 140,000. Out of the three Syrian Vicariates, Changanacherry was the biggest in the number of members and churches. The estimated number of faithful in the Vicariate of Trichur was 84,000, Ernakulam was 66,500 while that of Changanacherry was 102,500.

=== Attempts for Knanaya Vicariate ===
The Knanaya Catholics were disappointed that their community at Chumkom (Thodupuzha), Karimkunnam, Diamper, Brahmamangalam and Varappetty with three churches were under the Vicariate of Ernakulam. Out of 14,000 Southists, 1,500 were under the Vicariate of Ernakulam. They were worried that the community would be divided under different Syrian Vicariates in the future. So, they were appealing to the Holy See to establish a separate vicariate for the Knanaya Catholics.

On the other hand, the Northists in the Vicariate of Changanacherry were not content with the pastoral governance of an eparch from the minority community. When Mar Makil took charge In 1896 as the Vicar Apostolic of Changanacherry, the Northists were 100 to 109 thousand with 133 parishes and 256 priests. The Knanaites at the same time were a minority of less than 10% with 14,000 to 20,000 members, 12 parishes, and 21 priests. Since the Northists and Southists had no communal relationship, the Northists doubted the interests of the bishop, though he served the vicariate without any partiality as a benevolent father. The objections on the appointment of Mar Makil was not against his personal character because he tried his best to do justice to both communities.

In 1911, Mar Makil went to Rome with his secretary Fr. Chandy Chulaparambil, who became his successor, and Fr. Mathew Vattakkalam to request to Pope Pius X requesting to bifurcate the vicariate for the Southists and Northists with their own bishops. They reached Rome on 4 May 1911. He had a consensus letter for the same signed by the other two Vicar Apostolic of Ernakulam and Trichur. The three bishops of the Syrian Vicariates Mathew Makil (Changanacherry), Louis Pazheparambil (Ernakulam), and John Menacheril (Trichur) signed the petition on 1 March 1911 requesting to appoint separate vicariates and bishops for Southist and Northists. On the way Mar Makil and team visited the Holy Land and famous cities in Italy including Naples, Pompeii, Geneva, and Turin. On their return trip to Kerala, they visited Switzerland, Bavaria, Germany, Belgium, and France.

Fr. Mathew Vattakalam and Fr. Alexander Choolaparambil visited Propaganda Fide on 5 May 1911 to clarify the petitions signed by the three Syrian bishops. 1911 May 8: Mar Makil appeared in front of Propaganda Fide for the same purpose on 8 May 1911. Mar Makil and team met the pope on 22 May 1911 and presented the appeal to divide the Vicariate of Changanacherry for Southists and Northists by re-establishing the Vicariate of Kottayam for the Southists. He suggested that it was necessary for peaceful administration and pastoral growth of both the communities. The pope presented the matter for the study of Propaganda Fide. Propaganda Fide gave a positive recommendation on 31 July 1911 on the application submitted. The pope approved the recommendation on 28 August 1911.

=== Kottayam Knanaya Vicariate ===
Pope Pius X reestablished the Vicariate of Kottayam for the Southists on 29 August 1911 and appointed Mar Mathew Makil as its bishop with effect from 30 August 1911. Msgr. Thomas Kurialachery was appointed as the successor of Mar Makil at Changanacherry. The Knanaya Catholics who belonged to the Changanacherry and Ernakulam Vicariates were brought under the reconstituted Vicariate of Kottayam. They were 30,000 in number at that time. This important decision of Vatican helped to resolve 15 year old desire of the Northists and Southists to have their own vicariate and bishop.

On his return from Rome, Mar Makil instead of going to Changanacherry, arrived at Edacat (Kottayam) on 7 October 1911. From 4 September 1910 onwards, his communications were from Edacat.

Mar Mathew Makil received the documents of reestablishing the Kottayam Vicariate and appointing him as the Vicar Apostolate on 12 October 1911 through the Apostolic Delegate for East Asia. Mar Makil read the bull from Pope Pius X reestablishing the Kottayam Vicariate for the Southists and appointing him as its head on 23 November 1911 at Edacat church. Thus Edacat church in Kottayam became cathedral again. Mar Makil lived in a small house in Kottayam town near present BCM College. Mar Makil was relieved from Changanacherry after 15 years of his service there and continued her service for the welfare of the reconstituted Vicariate of Kottayam.

== Contributions ==
=== At Changanacherry ===
Mar Makil continued and advanced the initiatives of Bishop Charles Lavigne. They include codifying church laws, promoting education, systematizing catechism, promulgating spiritual devotions, and establishing religious congregations. As the first Malayalee bishop, he could interact more with the people. He made frequent parish visits and encouraged lay initiatives.

Book of Decrees (ദക്രേത്തു പുസ്തകം): A major contribution of Mar Makil was his Book of Decrees published on 21 September 1903. That was the first code of Canons of the Syrian Christians since the separation from the Archdiocese of Verapoly in 1887. Until then, the only code of canons was the Statutes of the Archbishop of Verapooly Msgr. Mellano that was published in 1879. So there was need of an organized code of law for the Syrians. The book specifies the laws concerning the spiritual and material governance of the vicariate in 38 chapters. The Book of Decrees was implemented for many years in the dioceses of Changanacherry, Kottayam and other Syrian dioceses until they made revised versions of their own based on this book. The book became the basis for later development of canons for the Syro-Malabar dioceses.

Church schools: Mar Makil encouraged to establish schools by the parishes and insisted that children should be taught in the Catholic schools. Many schools were established in the Vicariate during his tenure. He also established girls' schools to assure the education of future women.

Catechism: However along with secular education, Mar Makil insisted on the importance of religion classes. According to him, the main purpose of establishing educational institutions by the church was for religious formation of students. He promulgated that through his circulars, decrees, and his own model of teaching students during his pastoral visits to the parishes for confirmation. Mar Makil insisted that one hour per day should be devoted for catechism in schools. This is besides the regular catechism in the parishes under the leadership of priests. He printed a three volume catechism book. Mar Makil also promulgated adult catechism. He also introduced catechism examination as a requirement for Catholic marriage to make sure that those who enter into married life know the prayers and the basic teachings of the church.

Pious associations: Mar Makil encouraged pious associations in his vicariate. They were many including പരിശുദ്ധ കുർബാനയുടെ സഖ്യത (The Association of the Holy Eucharist), വ്യാകുല സൈന്യം (The Sorrowful Army), ദൈവമാതാവിന്റെ ഉത്തരീയ സഭ (The Scapular Society of the Mother of God), Franciscan Third Order, തിരുഹൃദയ സഖ്യം (The Society of Sacred Heart), മാർഗ്ഗമറീപ്പു സാമാജികം (The Society of Evangelization). Mar Makil introduced the last one to pray and financially support mission work. He appointed prominent priests as directors of some of these.

Religious congregations: Mar Makil was involved in the establishment of three religious congregations for women in the Syro-Malabar church while he served as Vicar General and Vicar Apostolic in Changanacherry.

1. Visitation congregation: Mar Mathew Makil started this congregation at Kaipuzha on 22 June 1892 when he was the Vicar General of the Southists under Bishop Charles Lavigne. He also put his share in donating land for the congregation.
2. Sisters of the Adoration of the Blessed Sacrament: Fr. Thomas Kurialacherry started this congregation at Edathua on 8 December 1908 with the permission and blessings from Mar Mathew Makil. Its first convent was started at Champakulam on 10 December 1908.
3. Sacred Heart Congregation: This religious institute for women was founded by Fr. Mathew Kadalikkattil on 1 January 1911 with the permission and at the inspiration of Mar Mathew Makil.

Conversion of schismatics: Following the example of his predecessor Bishop Charles Lavigne, Mar Makil also took special interest in the conversion of priests and lay people involved in schisms. Seven priests including Fr. Mani Kaniyarakath from Lalam New Church, Fr. Anthony Pallatt from Anakkallumkal were returned to Catholic faith. Thomas who joined Jacobite Church and used to publish "St. Thomas Gazette" also reunited with the Catholic faith.

Pastoral visits: Mar Makil's pastoral visits were different and interactive with people that was different from previous bishops. He made official pastoral visits to the parishes where previous bishops did not go. He also visited houses and made good interaction with people that made him popular among ordinary faithful. They wholeheartedly welcomed him to their houses.

=== Knanaya community ===
Along with Fr. Kuriakose Kandankary, Mar Mathew Makil appointed Fr. Mathew Kooplicat, from the Knanaya community as the vicar general for the Southists. He was overseeing the Kottayam and Kaduthuruthy foranes of the Southists.

== End of life ==
Mar Mathew Makil got sick and did his last Holy Mass on 21 January 1914. He had body pain on the 23rd and 102 degree fever on 24th. He died on 26 January 1914 after receiving the sacraments of Confession, Holy Communion, and Sacrament of the Sick with full conscience. His burial was done at Edacat church on the next day, 27 January 1914 in the presence of many priests and lay people. Fr. Mathew Kooplicat, the administrator of the vicariate was the main celebrant and Fr. Thomas Poothathil gave homily. Representative of Apostolic Delegate Fr. Bonifus and Vicar General of Verapoly also participated in the funeral service. Pope Pius X, Apostolic Delegate Msgr. Wladyslaw Michael Zaleski, and Divan of Travancore Sir P. Rajagopala Achariyar send condolence messages.

Bishop Makil Foundation was established to continue the vision of Mar Mathew Makil. Mar Mathew Moolakkatt inaugurated the foundation on 26 January 2001 on the 87th death anniversary of Mar Makil at Edacat. The foundation gives importance to the promotion of Knanaya Community and charity works.

== Timeline ==
- 1851 March 27: Birth at Manjoor, Travancore as the third son of Thomman and Anna Makil-puthenpurayil.
- 1866: Joined Puthenpally Seminary for priestly formation.
- 1874 May 30: Received priestly ordination from the Vicar Apostolic of Verapoly, Leonard Mellano of St. Louis, OCD
- 1874 June 8: First Holy Mass.
- 1874 - 1876: Professor of Syriac language at Puthenpally Seminary.
- 1876: Vicar at St. George's Church, Kaipuzha.
- 1885 December 25: Appointment as secretary of Co-adjutor Bishop of Verapoly Marcelinus Berarthi OCD
- 1886 March 1: Took charge as secretary of Co-adjutor Bishop of Verapoly Marcelinus Berarthi OCD.
- 1889 September 8: Bishop Charles Lavigne appointed Fr. Mathew Makil as Vicar General of the Vicariate of Kottayam (Changanacherry) with special privileges.
- 1890 January: First Pontifical Mass of Fr. Mathew Makil at Kaduthuruthy Church during the Three Day Fast.
- 1896 July 28: Pope Leo XIII reconstituted the Syrian Vicariates as Changanacherry, Trichur, and Ernakulam with Mar Mathew Makil as the Vicar Apostolic of Changanacherry.
- 1896 September 21: Fr. Mathew Makil received his appointment order as Vicar Apostolic of Changanacherry.
- 1896 October 25: Consecration at the Cathedral in Kandy, Ceylon by Wladyslaw Michael Zaleski.
- 1903 September 21: Publication of the Book of Decrees (Decreth Pusthakam).
- 1911 March 1: Bishops of the Syrian Vicariates Mathew Makil, Louis Pazheparambil, John Menacheril signed the petition to Vatican requesting to appoint separate vicariates and bishops for Southist and Northists.
- 1911 May 8: Mar Makil appeared in front of Propaganda Fide to present his request for separate vicariates for Northists and Southists.
- 1911 May 22: Met with Pope Pius X and requested to establish a vicariate exclusively for the Knanaya Catholics.
- 1911 July 31: Propaganda Fide decided to reconstitute the Vicariate of Kottayam for Knanaya Catholics.
- 1911 August 28: Pope Pius X approved the decision of Propaganda Fide to reestablish Kottayam Vicariate for Knanaya Catholics.
- 1911 August 29: Date of reconstitution of the Vicariate of Kottayam for Knanaya Catholics.
- 1911 August 30: Appointment of Mar Mathew Makil as the Vicar Apostolic of the reconstituted Vicariate of Kottayam for Knanaya Catholics.
- 1911 October 7: Mar Makil arrived at Edacat (Kottayam) after his trip to Rome.
- 1911 October 12: Mar Mathew Makil received the documents of reestablishing the Kottayam Vicariate and appointing him as the Vicar Apostolate.
- 1911 November 23: Mar Makil read the bull from Pope Pius X reestablishing the Kottayam Vicariate for the Southists and appointing him as its head.
- 1914 January 26: Died at Kottayam.
- 1914 January 27: Burial at Edacat church.
- 2001 January 26: Inauguration of Bishop Makil Foundation by Mar Mathew Moolakkatt at Edacat.
- 2009 January 26: Declaration as a Servant of God.
- 2025 May 22: Declaration as a Venerable.

== Bibliography ==
- Choolaparambil, Mar Alexander (Ed), (1925) Pastoral Letters, കാലം ചെയ്ത ഡോക്ടർ ലവീഞ്ഞ്, ഡോക്ടർ മാക്കീൽ എന്നീ വന്ദ്യ പിതാക്കന്മാർ തങ്ങളുടെ ഭരണകാലത്തു പ്രസിദ്ധപ്പെടുത്തിയിട്ടുള്ളത്. Kottayam: The Catholic Diocese of Kottayam.
- Kurian & Fr. Sebastian Nadackal. The Church of St. Thomas Christians Down the Centuries.
- Joseph, Antony, (1998). "മക്കീൽ മാർ മത്തായി മെത്രാനും ചങ്ങനാശ്ശേരി വികാരിയാത്തും (1986-1911)," ചങ്ങനാശേരി അതിരൂപത ഇന്നലെ, ഇന്ന്. Changanacherry: Archeparchy of Changanacherry. pp. 160–219.
- Kanjirathumkal, Varghese (2004). യുഗപ്രഭാവനായ മാർ മത്തായി മാക്കീൽ. Kottayam: Bishop Makil Foundation.
- Karukaparambil, Fr. Joy (1997). Mar Mathai Makil. Thellakom, Kottayam.
- Kochadampallil, Mathew (2019). Southist Vicariate of Kottayam in 1911: History and Importance. Delhi: Media House.
- Makil, Mathew (2001). കോട്ടയം മിസത്തിന്റെ സ്ഥാപന ചരിത്രം. Kottayam: Bishop Makil Foundation.
- മാക്കീൽ പിതാവും കേരള സഭയും. Kottayam: Knanaya History Congress.
- Moolakkatt, Archbishop Mathew (2006), "കോട്ടയം അതിരൂപത: ഉത്ഭവവും വളർച്ചയും" സുവർണ്ണസ്മൃതി, Golden Jubilee Souvenir, Changanacherry: Archeparchy of Changanacherry, pp. 389–392.
- Moolakkatt, Mar Mathew (2009). The Book of Decrees of Mar Mathew Makil. Bangalore: Syrian Churches Series XXI.
- Mutholath, Fr. Abraham (Ed.) Mar Mathew Makil, The Diocese of Kottayam Platinum Souvenir 1911-1986. Kottayam: Jyothi Book House. pp. 81–83.
- Pallath, Paul & George Kanjirakkatt. Origin of the Southist Vicariate of Kottayam, Acts and Facts. Vadavathoor, Kottayam: Oriental Institute of Religious Studies India. ISBN 978-81-88456-71-0.
- Poozhikunnel, Prof. Babu (2000), "മഹാരഥന്മാരുടെ പാതയിലൂടെ", മാർ മാത്യു മുലക്കാട്ട് മെത്രാഭിഷേക സ്മരണിക. Kottayam: Archeparchy of Kottayam, pp. 19–22.
- Puthenpurackal, Uthup Lucas (1911), "മക്കീൽ മാർ മത്തായി മെത്രാനവർകളുടെ ജീവചരിത്ര സംക്ഷേപം," മലയാളത്തെ സുറിയാനി ക്രിസ്ത്യനികളുടെ പുരാതനപ്പാട്ടുകൾ, Kottayam, pp. 1–2.
- Servant of God Mathew Makil, Kottayam: Visitation Sisters. 2009.
- Sr. ബനീഞ്ഞ് SVM, "ദൈവദാസൻ മാത്യു മാക്കീൽ കാലത്തിനു മുമ്പേ നടന്ന കർമ്മയോഗി," കോട്ടയം അതിരൂപത് ശതാബ്ദി സ്മരണിക 1911-2011, Archeparchy of Kottayam, 2012, pp. 23-24.
- സ്ഥാപകസന്നിധിയിൽ, Mar Makil Symposium. Kottayam: Visitation Congregation. 2009.
- Tharayil, Rev. Jose (Editor) (2009). ദൈവദാസൻ മാത്യു മാക്കീൽ, കോട്ടയം അതിരൂപതയുടെ ആത്മീയാചാര്യനും പിതൃതേജസ്സും. Kottayam: Visitation Generalate.
