= Catholic Congress =

Catholic Congress may refer to:

- Catholic lay organisations
- Catholic Congress Global, laity organisation of Syro-Malabar Church
