= St. Berchmans Higher Secondary School =

St. Berchmans Higher Secondary School Changanasserry

Location
- Changanassery, Kerala; India; 9.45373°N 76.54723°E

Information
- Other name: SBHSS
- Former name: SB English High School Changanasserry
- Motto: Age Quod Agis (Do well whatever you do)
- Religious affiliation: Christian
- Patron saint: St John Berchmans
- Established: 1891
- Founder: Mar Charles Lavigne
- School board: State Council for Educational Research and Training, Kerala
- Director: Fr Tony Chethipuzha
- Principal: Fr Roji Vallayil
- Headmaster: Mr Vinod Babu
- Grades: 1-12
- Gender: Boys(Classes 5-10) Co-education (Classes 1-4 & 11-12)
- Classes: 18
- Website: https://www.sbhss.in/

St. Berchmans Higher Secondary School is an aided Catholic Residential School in Changanasserry of Kottayam district. Established by Mar Charles Lavigne SJ, the then Vicar Apostolic of Kottayam, in 1891, is one of the oldest Catholic schools in Kerala. The school is run by Syro Malabar Catholic Archeparchy of Changanasserry. The school today has served its purpose producing many notable alumni especially in Catholic Church such as two Cardinals, Cardinal Antony Padiyara and Cardinal George Alencherry and Archbishops such as Mar Joseph Powathil and Mar Joseph Perumthottam.

Later, in 1922, A college was established on the cornerstone laid by Mar Charles Lavigne by Venerable Mar Thomas Kurialacherry on the same name, SB College Changanasserry, to provide higher education to the students of Malabar-Travancore region.

== History ==
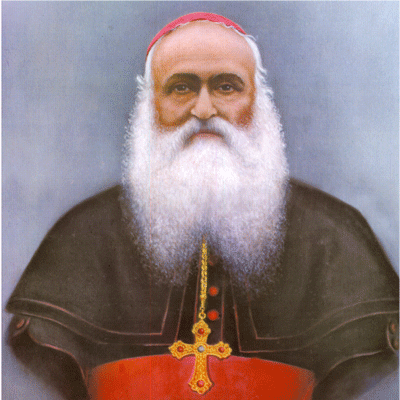
Mar Charles Lavigne

The boys' school was founded in 1891 by the French Jesuit Charles Lavigne, the first bishop of Changanacherry, as a residential (boarding) school on the wish of the commoners to provide their children access to primary education in English. Until 1997, students were admitted to Grades 5 through 10. In the 1998–99 school year, the school expanded to include Grades 11 and 12. Now the school's higher secondary studies include four science batches and two commerce batches. Built on a 10-acre campus with more than 3,000 students, St. Berchmans is one of the largest schools in Changanacherry. The school is part of the corporate management of schools in the Archdiocese of Changanassery. Starting from the academic year 2025-26, the Higher Secondary section of the school started admitting girl students as well.

== Administration ==
Administration of SB HSS, Changanacherry
1	Mar Thomas Tharayil	Patron, Archbishop of Changanassery
2	Very Rev. Fr. Antony Ethackad	Protosyncellus, Archeparchy of Changanassery
3	Very Rev. Fr. Scaria Kanniyakonil	Vicar General, Archeparchy of Changanassery
4	Fr Antony Moolayil	Corporate Manager
5	Fr Tony Chethipuzha	Manager
6	Fr Roji Vallayil	Principal
7	Sri Vinod Babu	Headmaster

== Facilities ==
=== Co curricular Activities ===
NCC Naval Unit, NCC Army Unit for Boys and Girls, Scouts, Guides, NSS, Professional Coaching in Football, School Radio, etc.

=== Library ===
The school's library has more than 20,000 books and journals.

=== Career guidance cell ===
The career guidance cell of the school gives information to the students on education and career opportunities. Currently, St. Berchmans is the Kottayam district nodal center of student career and counseling.

=== Orientation program ===
All students attend an orientation program at the beginning of the academic year. Different batches of 100 students attend two-day seminars of various activities for the students to get to know one another and realize their potential. Parents also attend sessions.

=== Boarding house ===
St. Berchmans was founded as a residential school and continues to operate a boarding house for students whose families live far away.
