= Kolundurai =

Kolundurai is a village near Paramakkudi, Ramanathapuram district, in southern India.

Neighbouring villages include Pandikammai Mesel and Manjoor
