= East Fort, Thrissur =

- town
- Location in Kerala, India
- Coordinates: 10°31′22″N 76°13′32″E
- Country: India
- State: Kerala
- District: Thrissur

Government
  - Body: Thrissur Municipal Corporation

Languages
  - Official: Malayalam, English
- Time zone: UTC+5:30 (IST)
- Postal code: 680005
- Vehicle registration: KL- 08

East Fort is a locality in Thrissur city in Kerala, India. The place derived its name from an old fort located at the eastern side of Thekkinkadu maidan.

== Places of interest ==
East fort junction is a heavy traffic junction in the city where many major education institutions and hospitals are situated. Many banks have their branches in East fort.

- Our Lady of Lourdes Syro-Malabar Catholic Metropolitan Cathedral
- Jubilee Mission Medical College and Research Institute
- Selex Mall
