= John Palocaren =

Founding principal of St. Thomas College, Thrissur

Mgr. John Palocaren (1886–1948) was the founding principal of St. Thomas College, Thrissur. Palocaren was born on 8 September 1886 in the Nadathara Palocaren family, an ancient Syrian Christian family of Kerala State, India. He was ordained as a minister in 1915, served at the St Thomas High School in Thrissur for three years, and was appointed the principal of St Thomas College when it was founded in April 1919. Soon after, he obtained MA in English Literature with distinction from the University of Edinburgh. In 1924 he returned as principal of St Thomas College, a status he retained until 1948. In 1937, he was awarded the status of Monsignor (Domestic Prelate). Palocaren died on 19 August 1948. The 125th anniversary of his birth was celebrated at the college on 8 September 2011.

Among Palocaren's former students are internationally respected spiritual teacher Eknath Easwaran, former Kerala Chief Minister E.M.S. Namboodiripad, former Bishop George Alappatt, and former Chief Justice M.S. Menon.

Palocaren was an editor of Keralam.

Historian George Menachery stated that Palocaren played a key role in the construction of the Basilica of Our Lady of Dolours, the largest church in India and the tallest in Asia.

== Recollections ==
Eknath Easwaran (1910–1999), whose writings on the spiritual life have been translated into more than 20 languages, recalled that Palocaren "taught only one class, Shakespeare. I sat right in front, my eyes riveted, not missing a word... Father John was a true Christian. He taught me more about Christianity than all the books I have read. Easwaran stated that:

During the four years I spent at college, without calling attention to what he was doing, Father John managed to work a great transformation in me. He helped me find confidence, but detachment as well. I was so grateful that I kept a picture of him in my room.

Raised a Hindu, Easwaran stated that "it wasn't a creed or religion I was drawn to, but the sheer nobility of the man himself. I never considered converting, and nothing in my relationship to Father John ever made me think he expected me to ... [it was] through the lives of individuals like Father John that the message of Christ first reached me."

M. A. Thomas, founder of the Ecumenical Christian Centre (Bangalore), recalled organizing an inter-religious conference for students in 1936. Father Palocaren "encouraged students to participate in the conference even though he had some misapprehension about the prospects of an Inter-religious conference. He told me that though it was not pure milk, some milk with water would be good for the students."

E.M.S. Namboodiripad (1909–1998), former Kerala Chief Minister, recalled that during his student days at St. Thomas College,

There were many teachers who had endeared themselves to us ... One among them deserving special mention was Principal Fr. Poulokaran [sic]. His subject was English. But in those days when English was compulsorily the medium of teaching even in high school classes, Fr. Poulokaran taught English with the help of Malayalam so as to make the students understand and enjoy the beauty of the English language.

Similarly, another former Kerala Chief Minister, C. Achutha Menon (1913–1991), recalled that "When Fr John Palocaren began his speech in Malayalam, all of us in the audience were surprised – since he was considered a brilliant scholar in English. He spoke such chaste Malayalam, fluent enough to engage us all."

== Selected works ==
- Palocaren, John (trans.) (1917). The Syriac Mass. Trichinopoly, Tamil Nadu, India: St Joseph's Industrial School Press. OCLC 752448888. OCLC 315980812
- Palocaren, John (1925). The College and its Founders. The St. Thomas College Magazine, Vol. I, nos. 1 & 2 (June–September), pp. 4–11.
