= Chowannur =

- Place
- Location in Kerala, India Chowannur (India)
- Coordinates: 10°39′0″N 76°5′0″E
- Country: India
- State: Kerala
- District: Thrissur
- Taluk: Talappilly

Languages
  - Official: Malayalam, English
- Time zone: UTC+5:30 (IST)
- PIN: 680517
- Nearest City: Kunnamkulam

Chowannur is a place in Thrissur district, state of Kerala, India.

Chowannur Burial Cave is a prehistoric megalithic rock cut cave in Chowannur. It is entered through a recessed opening on the east. The other sides of its chamber are circular and its vault hemispherical. On its northern and southern sides are two benches and there are five circular blocks along the western side of the chamber, which appear to be intended as stands for vessels. The Archaeological Survey of India has declared ita centrally protected monument.

== Notable people ==
- Augustine John Ukken
- Antony Eastman
