= Metropolitan Archbishop of Trichur =

Catholic church leader in India

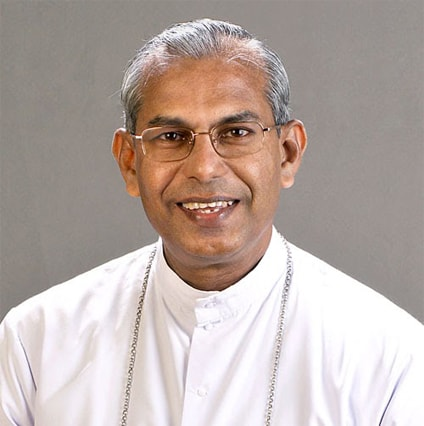
Metropolitan Archbishop of Thrissur: Mar Andrews Thazhath

The Metropolitan Archbishop of Thrissur is the chief bishop and principal leader of the nearly half a million Syro-Malabar Catholics in what used to be the largest Catholic diocese in India, when it included the Syro-Malabar archdiocese of Thrissur and the dioceses of Irinjalakuda, Palghat, and Ramanathapuram. He is also the Archbishop of the Syro-Malabar Catholic Archdiocese of Thrissur. The title carries significant influence because the archbishop serves as the custodian of St. Thomas Church (Palayur), where Christianity first arrived on the Indian subcontinent. Additionally, the archdiocese has produced two saints: Maria Theresa Chiramel and Euphrasia Eluvathingal.

== Politics ==
The Archbishop of Thrissur has been a vocal supporter of Christian politicians in Thrissur District and Kerala for a long time. However, the archbishop has been a staunch critic of the Communist Party of India and its policies in Kerala after India's Independence. Later in the decade, the archbishop emerged as a powerful force in Kerala politics, shaping outcomes in contests ranging from Kerala Legislature constituencies to India's lower house, the Lok Sabha.Thrissur District's assembly constituencies like Ollur Assembly Constituency, Chalakudy Assembly Constituency, Manalur Assembly Constituency, Thrissur Assembly Constituency, Wadakkanchery Assembly constituency and Irinjalakuda Assembly Constituency have a significant Syro malabar population, which elect representatives to Kerala Legislature. Thrissur Lok Sabha constituency, one of the 20 Lok Sabha constituencies in Kerala, is also in Thrissur District.

The trend started when Mar Joseph Kundukulam, the first Archbishop of Thrissur, befriended the late former Chief Minister of Kerala, K. Karunakaran. It is alleged that the archdiocese supported K. Karunakaran in his candidacy to the Kerala Legislature. This marked the beginning of the bond between the Indian National Congress and the Syro-Malabar Catholic Archdiocese of Thrissur. After the death of Kundukulam, Mar Jacob Thoomkuzhy was elected as the next archbishop. However, Thoomkuzhy was less interested in Kerala politics. Later Mar Andrews Thazhath was selected to head the archdiocese. In 2007, he campaigned against the policies of the V.S. Achuthanandan-led government toward the Church and its institutions. He even threatened the Communist-led government, warning that the Church might re-enact the "Liberation Struggle" of the late 1950s.

=== Oommen Chandy Ministry ===
Relations between the Oommen Chandy ministry and Andrews Thazhath were not cordial. The trouble started when Indian National Congress and Kerala Congress decided to field P. C. Chacko for Thrissur Lok Sabha constituency in the 2014 Indian general election. The Metropolitan Archbishop of Thrissur was unhappy with P. C. Chacko due to his poor performance in earlier terms, his identity as a non-Syrian Catholic, and his status as an outsider to the Thrissur District. In 1991, P. C. Chacko won the Thrissur Lok Sabha constituency but subsequently vacated the contest, fearing backlash. In 2009, Indian National Congress forced Metropolitan Archbishop of Thrissur to accept P. C. Chacko as the candidate. By 2014, the Metropolitan Archbishop of Thrissur opposed the Indian National Congress's decision to field Chacko again, citing the local preference for a candidate residing in Thrissur District and criticizing Chacko's perceived neglect of local development. Although P. C. Chacko held high offices such as national spokesman for the Indian National Congress and Chairman of the Joint Parliamentary Committee, he did little to advance the development of Thrissur. Later on, K. P. Dhanapalan MP from Chalakudy (Lok Sabha constituency) was fielded from the Thrissur Lok Sabha constituency.

== List of bishops and archbishops of Thrissur ==
Bishops and archbishops of Thrissur
From	Until	Incumbent	Notes
1887	1896	Adolph Medlycott	He was the first and only bishop from outside Kerala to be consecrated for this see. Consecrated on 11 December 1887, resigned in 1896, died on 4 May 1918.
1896	1919	John Menachery	Consecrated on 25 October, died on 19 December 1919.
1921	1942	Francis Vazhapilly	Consecrated on 6 July 1921, died on 12 May 1942.
1944	1970	George Alapatt	Consecrated on 1 May 1944, died on 6 November 1973.
1970	1997	Joseph Kundukulam	First Metropolitan Archbishop of Thrissur. Nominated on 4 June 1970, consecrated on 16 August 1970, died on 26 April 1998.
1997	2007	Jacob Thoomkuzhy	Second Metropolitan Archbishop of Thrissur.
2007	Present	Andrews Thazhath	Third Metropolitan Archbishop of Thrissur.
