= Charles Lavigne =

French Catholic bishop

The Most Reverend Charles Lavigne S.J.
- First Vicar Apostolic of Kottayam
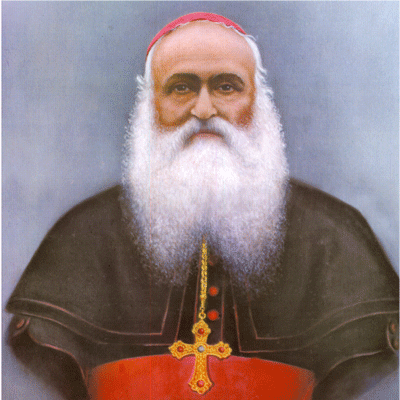
- Portrait of Charles Lavigne S.J.
- Church: Catholic Church (Latin Church)
- Diocese: Apostolic Vicariate of Kottayam
- See: Trincomalee
- Appointed: 27 August 1898
- Term ended: 11 July 1913
- Predecessor: post established
- Successor: Gaston Robichez, S.J
- Other post: First Bishop of Trincomalee, Sri Lanka
- Previous post: Secretary to Jesuit General in Rome

Personal details
- Born: Louis; January 6, 1840 Marvejols, France
- Died: July 11, 1913 (aged 73) Marvejols, France
- Occupation: Catholic bishop
- Profession: December 1866
Charles Lavigne
- First Vicar Apostolic of Kottayam (later renamed Changanacherry), Kerala
- Appointed: 13 September 1887
- Installed: 10 May 1888
- Term ended: 11 June 1896
- Predecessor: post established
- Successor: Matthew Makil
Orders
- Ordination: 1864
- Consecration: 13 November 1887 by Bishop Julien Costes

Charles Lavigne, S.J. was a Catholic bishop of the Latin Church from France who was appointed the first Vicar Apostolic in the Syro-Malabar Catholic Church Vicariate of Kottayam on 20 May 1887. After shifting the seat of Kottayam Vicariate to Changanacherry on 16 September 1890, his term ended on 28 July 1896. He later served as the first Bishop of Trincomalee, Sri Lanka from 27 August 1898 until his death at Marvejols in France on 11 July 1913. He is famous for his contributions for education with help of Catholic Church, in Travancore and Malabar region, especially St Berchmans English High School (1891).

== Early life ==
Louis Charles Lavigne was born in the Lavigne family on 6 January 1840 at Marvejols in France. His father was a farmer and an employee in a weaving mill. Charles' mother Louie Gordon was a convert from Protestantism. Charles was the youngest of the 12 children in the family. After his primary education at the school of Christian Brothers and higher education at a Jesuit college at the City of Mend in France, he joined seminary for priestly formation. Though his intention was to become a Jesuit priest, he first became a diocesan priest respecting the wishes of his parents.

Charles' priestly ordination was on 17 December 1864 at Mend by the imposition of hands by Msgr. Flockier. Charles was professor at Mend Diocesan Minor Seminary at the time of his ordination and he continued that for two more years. He joined the novitiate house of the Society of Jesus at Toulouse in France and did his religious profession on 27 December 1866. Then he served as prefect of the seminarians and teacher and prefect of studies in the minor seminary at Monbana in France for five years. Afterwards, he taught Mathematics and Physics at Kausia College.

Since Jesuits were expelled from France in 1880, he moved to Spain and worked as a science professor at Uclés College. He was then transferred to Rome as assistant to Fr. Buck S.J., the general secretary of the Society of Jesus. After the death of Fr. Buck, Fr. Charles returned from Rome to France.

== Vicar Apostolic of Kottayam ==
The Syrian Catholics, who were part of the Vicariate of Verapoly along with the Latin Catholics, had been writing to Vatican seeking the establishment of Syrian dioceses and appointment of eparchs from their own rite and community. Though Bishop Mercellinus OCD, the co-adjutor bishop of Verapoly, was in charge of the Syrians, majority of them believed that their development would happen only under the leadership of their own bishops.

Considering the wishes of the Syrian faithful in Kerala, Pope Leo XIII separated the Syrians from the Archdiocese of Verapoly and established the Vicariates of Kottayam and Trichur. Msgr. Adolphus Edwin Medlycott was appointed the Vicar Apostolic of Trichur and Charles Lavigne, the Vicar Apostolic of Kottayam and Titular Bishop of Milevum on 20 May 1887. Their role was to pave the way for transition from the governance of foreign hierarchs to local bishops as head of the Syrian Catholics.

=== Reception and setup ===
Within a few months after Charles returned from Rome to France, he was appointed Vicar Apostolic of Kottayam, in Kerala state, India on 23 August 1887. His episcopal ordination as Titular Bishop of Milevum was on 13 November 1887 by Cardinal Borse. He started his journey to Kerala on 15 March 1888. He reached Trichy on 5 April 1888. At the request of Apostolic Delegate Msgr. Andrew Aiuti, Fr. Mani Nidhiri, Fr. Louis Pazheparambil, and Fr. Alexander T. OCD went to receive the bishop at Trichy. They, along with the bishop, went to Ootty to meet the Apostolic Delegate. Then they proceeded to Ernakulam which was also part of Kottayam Vicariate. After the reception at Ernakulam on 1 May 1888, Bishop Charles travelled to Mannanam via Vaikam by waterway. The reception at Mannanam on 9 May 1888 was a grant one. Bishop Lavinge took charge reading his papal bull at St. George Church Edacat on 10 May 1888. That church became the first Cathedral of Vicariate of Kottayam.

Honoring the instruction from Rome, Bishop Charles appointed four Syrian priests as his consultors. Fr. Mani Nidhirikkal, Fr. Alexander Kattakkayath, Fr. Louis Pazheparambil were the consultors from the Northists and Fr. Joseph Tharayil was from the Southists. Bishop first lived at Mannanam Carmelite House and later moved to Kottayam town. According to the letter from the Apostolic Delegate on 6 May 1889 from Ootty, Bishop Charles appointed Fr. Mani Nidhiriakkal as Vicar General in charge of the Northists and Fr. Mathew Makil as Vicar General for Southists on 8 September 1889. These Vicar Generals from the local priests had some privileges including dressing like a bishop, right to offer Pontifical Mass, administer the Sacrament of Confirmation, and giving minor orders for seminarians.

Though Charles made attempts to construct his residence and an educational institution in Kottayam town, he could not do them because of the ongoing disagreements with non-Catholics during that time. So, with the permission from ecclesiastical authorities, he moved his seat to Changanacherry that had a bigger church than Edacat and had a higher Catholic population. While maintaining the name, Vicariate of Kottayam, he moved to Changanacherry after two years on 16 September 1890.

=== Contributions in Kerala ===
Considering the ardent desire of the Syrian Christians, Bishop Charles worked hard for the development of his vicariate. He trained the clergy for their future pastoral leadership. He appointed vicar generals from Northists and Southists of his diocese and administered the vicariate through them. Instead of the traditional system of training candidates for priesthood by individual priests, Lavigne sent seminarians from his vicariate to seminaries in Verapoly, Mangalapuram, Papal Seminary in Kandy, and Propaganda Seminary in Rome.

Lavinge held a Synod at the Church in Changanacherry from 18 to 20 December 1888 to discuss and decide on the details of pastoral arrangements in his vicarate. Vicars of parishes, superiors of religious congregations, and rectors of seminaries attended in the Changanacherry synod that made several pastoral decisions.

Bishop Lavigne established new churches. He elevated eight parishes of the Northists and two parishes of Southists as foranes on 10 October 1891. He codified regulations for church administration, introduced catechism classes in parishes and schools, and showed his interest in administering first Holy Communion to children. He promoted the use of scapular and devotion to the souls in purgatory. He gave importance to evangelization among the low castes and established churches for the new converts. He, along with Fr. Mani Nidhirikkal, promoted reunion of Jacobites to Catholic faith.

There were schisms against Catholic faith in the community. Lavigne tried to convince their leaders and followers to keep up the Catholic doctrines. He could win some of them.

Lavigne was the pioneer in establishing English educational institutions for the Syrians. The first school he established was St. Berchmans English High School in Changanacherry. He also started schools in other places including Brahmamangalam for the Southists, and supported school at Mannanam established by Carmelite priests. He established Girls Schools at Mutholy, Changanacherry, and Alappuzha. Along with convents, Bishop Charles started Job training centers for women.

Lavigne started or approved the establishment of religious congregations for men and women in the vicariate. He approved the desire of eight pious women from Pala and neighboring places, who were members of the Secular Franciscan (Third) Order to start a religious community. Thus, the Franciscan Clarist Congregation (FCC) was started at Changanacherry. Bishop Charles started an orphanage and entrusted that to the Clarist sisters. He started four religious communities for Carmelite Sisters. They were at Mutholay, Changanacherry, Vaikom, and Arakkuzha. He also promoted the establishment of the Visitation Congregation for the Southists at Kaipuzha.

=== Succession Plan ===
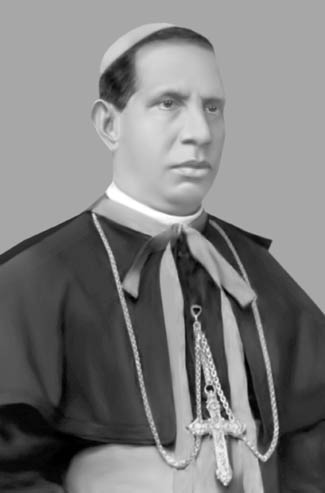
Mar Mathew Makil, the successor of Bishop Lavigne at Changanacherry.

In 1892, Lavigne fell ill and underwent surgery at St. Martha's Hospital in Bangalore by a French doctor. He did not fully recover from the sickness. He and the Vicar Apostolic of Trichur Msgr. Adolphus Edwin Medlycott recommended to Propaganda Fide, the reconstitution of the Kottayam and Trichur vicariates as Vicariates of Trichur, Ernakulam, and Changanacherry.

The prefect of Propaganda Fide in Rome Mieczysław Halka-Ledóchowski asked Lavigne in 1895 to recommend the names of priests who could be his successors of the Vicariate of Kottayam. He recommended Vicar General Mar Mathew Makil and his secretary Fr. Louis Pazhiparambil as the eligible candidates in his reply to the prefect dated 22 February 1895.

Since Lavigne's health was worsening, he went to Europe with his secretary Fr. Luis Pazheparambil on 30 September 1895. His intention was to seek better medical treatment, visit the Pope to present the report of his vicariate, and to raise funds for the upgrading of St. Berchmans School in Changanacherry. In January 1896, he had another surgery at his native Toulouse, and recovered from his sickness after this surgery.

According to the recommendation of the Apostolic Vicars of Kottayam and Trichur, the Holy See reconstituted the two vicariates as three with local priests as bishops. Thus, Mar Mathew Makil was appointed for Changanacherry, Mar Aloysius Pazheparambil for Ernakulam, and Mar John Menachery for Trichur on 28 July 1896.

== Bishop of Trincomalee ==
=== Transition to Sri Lanka ===
After his apostolic visit, he stayed at Uclés school in Spain and later at Balardi College in France. While in Europe, Bishop Lavigne came to know that he was relieved from his position of Vicar Apostolic of Kottayam. So he did not return to Kerala to accept any gratitude from the people he served for eight years.

During his stay in France, he was appointed the Coadjutor Vicar Apostolic of Madagascar, France with effect from 8 May 1897. Bishop Jean-Baptiste Cazet, S.J. was the Vicar Apostolic of Madagascar at that time. The French government did not agree with Charles' appointment. So, he helped the local bishops in their pastoral ministry. Soon, Bishop Charles was appointed the first bishop of the newly established Diocese of Trincomalee in Sri Lanka on 27 August 1898. He reached the new diocese in November 1898 and took charge.

=== Contributions in Trincomalee ===
Lavigne converted many to Catholic faith. He opened a public library at Batticaloa in 1907 to keep communication with the non-Christians. He constructed many churches and reconstructed the old ones.

The bishop promoted education of children. He started orphanages and schools. He established a college in Trincomalee with the support of missionaries. To overcome the shortage of teachers, bishop started a teachers' training school. He started orphanages and schools for girls and entrusted their management to religious congregations.

Bishop Lavigne promoted vocations to priesthood and religious life. He established a minor seminary in his diocese. Candidates to priesthood were sent to different seminaries for formation. He welcomed missionaries from Europe including nuns and religious brothers. He promoted establishing religious congregations in his diocese. The bishop trained foreign missionaries in Tamil language for preaching to the local people. He established retreat centers in his diocese.

=== Silver Jubilee ===
Trincomalee Diocese celebrated the Episcopal Silver Jubilee of Bishop Charles Lavinge on 13 November 1912. Besides the large attendance in the jubilee celebration, greetings and gifts came to the jubilarian from different countries and people of different religions including Kerala where he served before. Pope Pius X honored him with the title, "Domestic Prelate and Assistant to the Pontifical Throne."

== End Times ==
Lavigne went to Europe in 1913. He visited Marseille in France and then went to the Vatican to visit the Pope. He visited France, Belgium, and Holland. He took rest at his native place, Marvejols in France. While taking part in a reception in his honor at Montpellier Charity School, he became ill and contracted pneumonia. His sickness got worse. He received Sacrament of the Sick from the Superior of the Society of Jesus. He died on 11 July 1913 at the age of 73, and was buried in the cathedral there.

The Archeparchy of Kottayam has installed a monument at his first Cathedral St. George's Church Edacat in Kottayam where he was installed as the Vicar Apostolic of Kottayam on 10 May 1888. The Visitation Congregation's convent in Edacat and the Vallambrosian Benedictine Minor Seminary near Kottayam are established in the name of Bishop Charles Lavigne.

== See also ==
- Knanayology
- Archeparchy of Kottayam
- Archeparchy of Changanacherry
- Diocese of Trincomalee

== Bibliography ==
- Choolaparambil, Mar Alexander (Ed)., Pastoral Letters, കാലം ചെയ്ത ഡോക്ടർ ലവീഞ്ഞ്, ഡോക്ടർ മാക്കീൽ എന്നീ വന്ദ്യ പിതാക്കന്മാർ തങ്ങളുടെ ഭരണകാലത്തു പ്രസിദ്ധപ്പെടുത്തിയിട്ടുള്ളത്. Kottayam: The Catholic Diocese of Kottayam. 1925.
- Koottummel, Joseph (1998). "മാർ ചാറൽസ് ലവീഞ്ഞ്," ചങ്ങനാശേരി അതിരൂപത ഇന്നലെ, ഇന്ന്. Changanacherry: Archeparchy of Changanacherry. pp. 122–159.
- Kottoor, Dr. Thomas (2012). "ബിഷപ്പ് കാർലോസ് ലവീഞ്ഞ് കോട്ടയം അതിരൂപതയ്ക്ക് വഴികാട്ടി" കോട്ടയം അതിരൂപത ശതാബ്ദി സ്മരണിക 1911- 2011. Kottayam: Archeparchy of Kottayam. 2012, pp. 22–23.
- Makil, Mathew (2001). കോട്ടയം മിസത്തിന്റെ സ്ഥാപന ചരിത്രം. Kottayam: Bishop Makil Foundation.
- Moolakkatt, Archbishop Mathew (2006), "കോട്ടയം അതിരൂപത: ഉത്ഭവവും വളർച്ചയും" സുവർണ്ണസ്മൃതി, Golden Jubilee Souvenir, Changanacherry: Archeparchy of Changanacherry, pp. 389–392.
- Mutholath, Fr. Abraham (Ed.) Dr. Charles Lavigne S.J. (1986). The Diocese of Kottayam Platinum Souvenir 1911–1986. Kottayam: Jyothi Book House. pp. 79–81.
- Pallath, Paul & George Kanjirakkatt. Origin of the Southist Vicariate of Kottayam, Acts and Facts. Vadavathoor, Kottayam: Oriental Institute of Religious Studies India. ISBN 978-81-88456-71-0.
- Perumthottam, Dr. Joseph (Ed.) (1999). മാർ ചാൾസ് ലവീഞ്ഞ്, ജീവചരിത്രവും ഇടയലേഖനങ്ങളും. Changanacherry: HIRS Publications.
- ശാന്തിതീർത്ഥം, വിസിറ്റേഷൻ സഭാചരിത്രം (History of the Visitation Sisters). Kottayam: Visitation Congregation, Kottayam. 1997. pp. 92–95.
