= St. Mary's Forane Church, Pulinkunnoo =

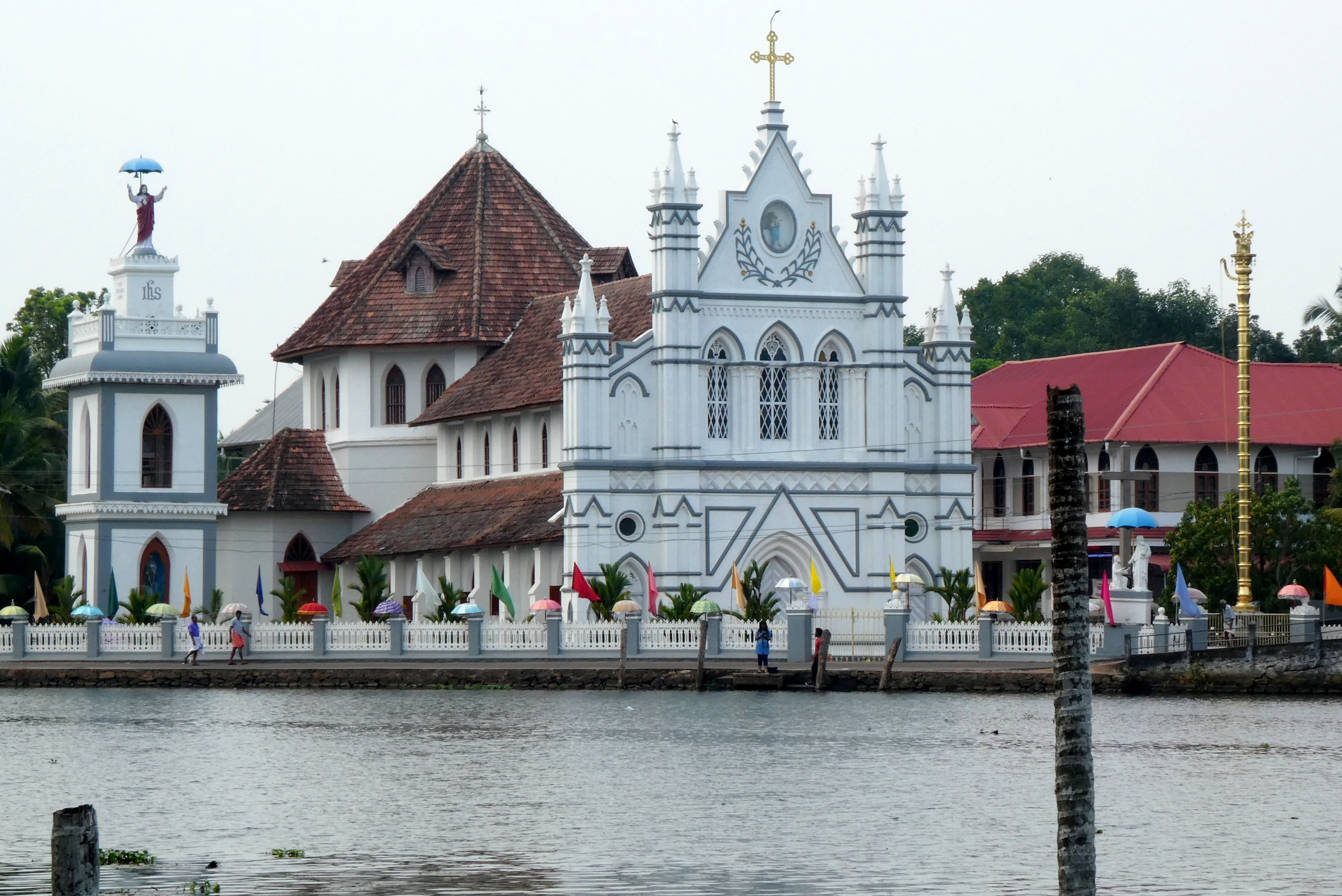
- St. Mary's Forane Church, Pulinkunnoo

- Location within Kerala
- 9.412°N 76.41°E
- Location: Pulinkunnoo in Kuttanad, Kerala
- Country: India
- Denomination: Syro-Malabar Catholic Church

History
- Founded: 1450; 576 years ago
- Dedication: Saint Mary

Architecture
- Architectural type: Portuguese architectural style

Administration
- District: Alappuzha
- Archdiocese: Changanassery

Clergy
- Archbishop: Bishop Mar Thomas Tharayil
- Vicar: Fr. Tom

St. Mary's Syro Malabar Catholic Forane Church, Pulinkunnoo is a Catholic church located in Alappuzha district of Kerala, India. Located in a small village named Pulinkunnoo in Kuttanad, the church is also known as Pulinkunnoo church or Pulinkunnu church. It is one of the oldest church and Christian pilgrim centre under the Syro-Malabar Catholic Archeparchy of Changanacherry.

== Overview ==
St. Mary's Forane Church, Pulinkunnoo is a Catholic church located in a small village named Pulinkunnoo in Kuttanad, Alappuzha district. This church is more than five hundred years old and has been renovated four times. Many centuries old objects and documents are kept in this church. Decades old iron staircase, wooden confession booths and special carvings on the altar are all features of this church.

Pulinkunnoo Church, which is also the parish where the Saint Kuriakose Elias Chavara served.

== History ==
The early Christians of Kuttanad used to do spiritual things in the Niranam Church, which was established by the disciple of Christ, Thomas the Apostle. Later, with the establishment of the Kallurkkad Church, the center of worship of Christians in Kuttanad became the Kallurkkad church (Basilica of St. Mary, Champakulam). When the number of Christians increased in Pulinkunnoo and surrounding areas, efforts were started under the leadership of Chakala Eepan Tarakan, who was the leader of the Christians at that time, to establish a church at Pulinkunnoo as well. Chakala Eepan Tharakan met Vadakumkur Koical Thampuran who was the local ruler of these regions at that time to build a church there, and the request was allowed by the Thampuran. The Araya (A community whose main livelihood has traditionally been fishing) people who used to live there were shifted to another place. The 'Vallapura' (traditional canoe shed) was demolished to build the church structure.

This first Christian church in Pulinkunnoo was established in AD 1450. After 1500 AD, King of Chembakassery (present-day Ambalapuzha) conquered the Pulinkunnoo area and annexed it to his kingdom. During the reign of the Chembakassery kings, many Christians migrated from other areas to Kuttanad including Pulinkunnoo. In 1557, the Christians of Pulinkunnoo and its surrounding areas decided to demolish and rebuild the old church. The last Chaldaean Bishop of Kerala, who was in disguise fearing the Portuguese, was invited to Pulinkunnoo by the Christian families and the foundation of the church was laid by him. On 4 February 1557, Pope Paul IV established the Diocese of Cochin and placed the entire area under this diocese. When the construction was completed, the new church was consecrated and the church was given the name of Virgin Mary, according to the special interest of the then Bishop of Cochin and the believers of Pulinkunnoo.

In 1750, Maharaja Marthandavarma conquered the kingdom of Chembakassery and annexed it to Travancore. With this many families from different parts of Travancore again migrated to Kuttanad. Most of the present Christian families in Pulinkunnoo have migrated during this time. As the number of believers increased, the church was renovated again in 1885. Srampikal Geevargis Katanar, who was a parishioner of the church, led the construction of the present church. The foundation stone of the church and the laying of the first stone was carried out by Fr. Geevargis Veliyanad, who was a parishioner of this church. The new church was built on the foundation of the old church.

== Location ==
St. Mary's Forane Church is located on the banks of Pampa river at Pulinkunnoo in Kuttanad in Alappuzha district. It is located about 17 km away from Alappuzha Bus Stand and about 16.5 km away from Alappuzha railway station.

== Charitable activities ==
In 2020, the church authorities had given away 2.06 acres of land free of cost for Pulinkunnoo Taluk Hospital. 8 cents of land was also handed over to the government in 1956, for the building the first hospital which was now elevated as a taluk hospital.

This church was one of the refuge centers for the locals during the 2019 Kerala floods. At the beginning of the flood, the church authorities, who had delivered food to the houses, opened the parish hall of the church itself when the water entered the houses, temporary accommodation facilities have also been arranged in the church. The church's kitchen was also opened to cook for those who sought refuge in the church.

== In popular culture ==
The church gained more attention when it was appeared in Gautham Vasudev Menon's film 'Vinnaithaandi Varuvaayaa'.
