= George Alapatt =

Bishop

Mar George Alapatt
- Bishop of Trichur; Assistant at the Pontifical Throne
- Province: Kerala
- Diocese: Syro-Malabar Catholic Archdiocese of Thrissur
- See: Thrissur
- Term ended: 4 June 1970
- Predecessor: Mar Francis Vazhapilly
- Successor: Mar Joseph Kundukulam
- Other posts: Second Vatican Council, Council Father

Orders
- Ordination: 17 December 1927
- Consecration: 1 May 1944

Personal details
- Born: 11 February 1900 Karanchira, Thrissur, British India (present-day Kerala, India)
- Died: 6 November 1973 (aged 73)
- Buried: Our Lady of Lourdes Metropolitan Cathedral, Thrissur
- Denomination: Syro-Malabar Catholic Church
- Education: St. Thomas College, Thrissur, Congregation for the Evangelization of Peoples, University of Detroit Mercy

Mar George Alapatt (11 February 1900 – 6 November 1973) was the fourth Bishop of Syro-Malabar Catholic Archdiocese of Thrissur, from 1 May 1944 until 4 June 1970, when he retired. Alapatt was born at Karanchira in Thrissur district on 11 February 1900. He attended all the four sessions of the Second Vatican Council (1962–1965). He died in his sleep on 6 November 1973.
