= Francis Vazhapilly =

Indian bishop

Mar Francis Vazhappilly
- Bishop of Thrissur
- Province: Kerala
- Diocese: Syro-Malabar Catholic Eparchy of Thrissur
- See: Thrissur
- Predecessor: John Menachery
- Successor: George Alapatt
- Other post: Titular Bishop of Philadelphia

Orders
- Ordination: 22 December 1906

Personal details
- Born: 18 May 1878 Puthenvelikara, Irinjalakuda, Thrissur, British India (present-day Kerala, India)
- Died: 12 May 1942
- Buried: Our Lady of Lourdes Metropolitan Cathedral, Thrissur
- Denomination: Roman Catholic Church

Mar Francis Vazhappilly was Late Bishop of Trichur (1921–1942).

Dr. Francis Vazhappilly was born on 18 May 1878 at Puthenvelikara, ordained on 22 December 1906 and was nominated as Titular Bishop of Philadelphia and the Vicar Apostolic of Thrissur in 1921. He was consecrated on 6 July in the Lourdes Cathedral by the Delegate Apostolic H. E. Dr. Peter Pisani and took charge on the same day. On 21 December 1923 when the Syro-Malabar Hierarchy was established and Trichur was elevated to the status of a diocese, Dr. Francis Vazhappilly became the first Bishop of Thrissur. In 1929 he made the 1st "Ad Limina" visit to Rome. He died on 12 May 1942 and his body was laid to rest in the new Church of Our Lady of Dolours, Thrissur.

He died on 12 May 1942, and was interred in the Basilica of Our Lady of Dolours.
