= Kanjirathanam =

- town
- Location in Kerala, India Kanjirathanam (India)
- Coordinates: 9.7476°N 76.5300°E
- Country: India
- State: Kerala
- District: Kottayam

Languages
  - Official: Malayalam, English
- Time zone: UTC+5:30 (IST)

Kanjirathanam is a small town in Kottayam District, Kerala, India located between kuruppanthara and Kuravilangad.

== Demographics ==
Kanjirathanam population primarily consists of Syrian Catholic Christians, but there is a small population of Hindus too. Mostly all household in this village have NRI (Non-Resident India) family members, the majority of them overseas (The United Kingdom, United States, Europe, Australia etc.).

== History ==
Kanjirathanam is of historical importance due to a cave known as Puliala, literally meaning cave of leopard. The cave, which is made of laterite, got its name from an occurrence of finding a few leopard cubs at the mouth of the cave about 200 years ago. A commonly held local belief is that the cave have been used by local king. It is said that a king dug the cave to hide from his rivals after losing a battle.
