= Manjoor (village) =

- Village
- Location in Kerala, India Manjoor (India)
- Coordinates: 9°42′0″N 76°30′0″E
- Country: India
- State: Kerala
- District: Kottayam
- PIN: 686603
- Telephone code: 04829
- Vehicle registration: KL-36, KL-67
- Nearest city: Ettumanoor
- Lok Sabha constituency: Kottayam
- Climate: Tropical (Köppen)

Manjoor is a village located in the northern part of the Kottayam district in the state of Kerala, India. It lies approximately 20 kilometers north of the district capital, Kottayam, and is situated along the Kottayam–Vaikom bus route. Manjoor is in close proximity to the towns of Kuravilangad, Ettumanoor, and Kaduthuruthy.

== See also ==
- Kothanalloor
- Kanjirathanam
