= Karanchira =

- town, Village
- Location in Kerala, India Karanchira (India)
- Coordinates: 10.398085°N 76.159372°E
- Country: India
- State: Kerala
- District: Thrissur

Languages
  - Official: Malayalam, English
- Time zone: UTC+5:30 (IST)
- Vehicle registration: KL-45
- Nearest city: Thrissur

Karanchira is a small village in Thrissur district of Kerala, South India. This hamlet is surrounded by a river(Karivannur River) and green fields, and is a part of the Mukundapuram parliament constituency. Kattoor is nearest place to Karanchira.

The postal pin code is 680702.

Karanchira has a multi specialty hospital - The Bishop Alapatt Hospital. Expatriates are the backbone of the economy. Agriculture is the source of income for a substantial minority.
