= Adolph Medlycott =

Bishop of the Catholic Archdiocese of Thrissur (1838-1918)

The Most Reverend Mar Adolph Medlycott
- First Vicar Apostolic of Thrissur
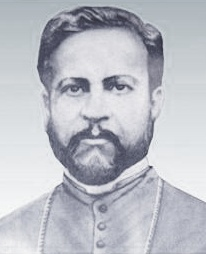
- Province: Cochin
- Diocese: Apostolic Vicariate of Trichur
- See: Tricomia
- Term ended: 1896
- Successor: Mar John Menachery
- Other posts: Founder, St. Thomas College, Thrissur

Orders
- Ordination: 17 March 1861
- Consecration: 13 September 1887
- Rank: Bishop

Personal details
- Born: 15 May 1838 Chittagong, Bengal Presidency, Company Raj
- Died: 4 May 1918 (aged 79)
- Buried: Our Lady of Lourdes Metropolitan Cathedral, Thrissur
- Denomination: Roman Catholic Church
- Parents: Adolphus Edwin Medlycott and Annette
- Occupation: Priesthood
- Education: Congregation for the Evangelization of Peoples

Mar Adolph Medlycott was the first Bishop of the Catholic Apostolic Vicariate of Thrissur. He was born at Chittagong on 15 May 1838. Medlycott spent his last days in Bangalore where he died on 4 May 1918. His remains were later reinterred, first in the Basilica of Our Lady of Dolours in 1945.

== Books ==
- India and the Apostle Thomas: An Inquiry, with a Critical Analysis of the Acta Thomae by A. E. Medlycott; Published 1905 by David Nutt. Reprinted unabridged in the Indian Church History Classics, Vol.I, Ed. G. Menachery, Ollur, 1998.
- Saint Thomas Christians, A. E. Medlycott (1912), Catholic Encyclopedia: An International Work of Reference on the Constitution, Doctrine, Discipline, and History of the Catholic Church, Robert Appleton Company. Volume 14, pp. 678–688
