= Pulinkunnu =

Village in Kerala, India

- village
- Location in Kerala, India Pulinkunnu (India)
- Coordinates: 9.412°N 76.41°E
- Country: India
- State: Kerala
- District: Alappuzha
- Talukas: Kuttanad

Government
  - Body: Gram panchayat

Population (2011)
  - Total: 15,210

Languages
  - Official: Malayalam, English
- Time zone: UTC+5:30 (IST)
- PIN: 688504
- ISO 3166 code: IN-KL
- Vehicle registration: KL-04, KL-66
- Literacy: 99%

Pulinkunnu is a small village in the Kuttanadu region of Alappuzha district in the Indian state of Kerala. The Pampa river in Pulincunnoo is a route for houseboat tourism operators in Kuttanadu. The village is part of the islands dotting the Kerala Backwaters, a network of lakes, wetlands, and canals crisscrossing the state. The village is around 20 km from Alleppey and 15 km from Changanacherry.

== Places of worship ==
- St. Mary's Forane Church, Pulinkunnu
