= Our Lady of Lourdes Metropolitan Cathedral =

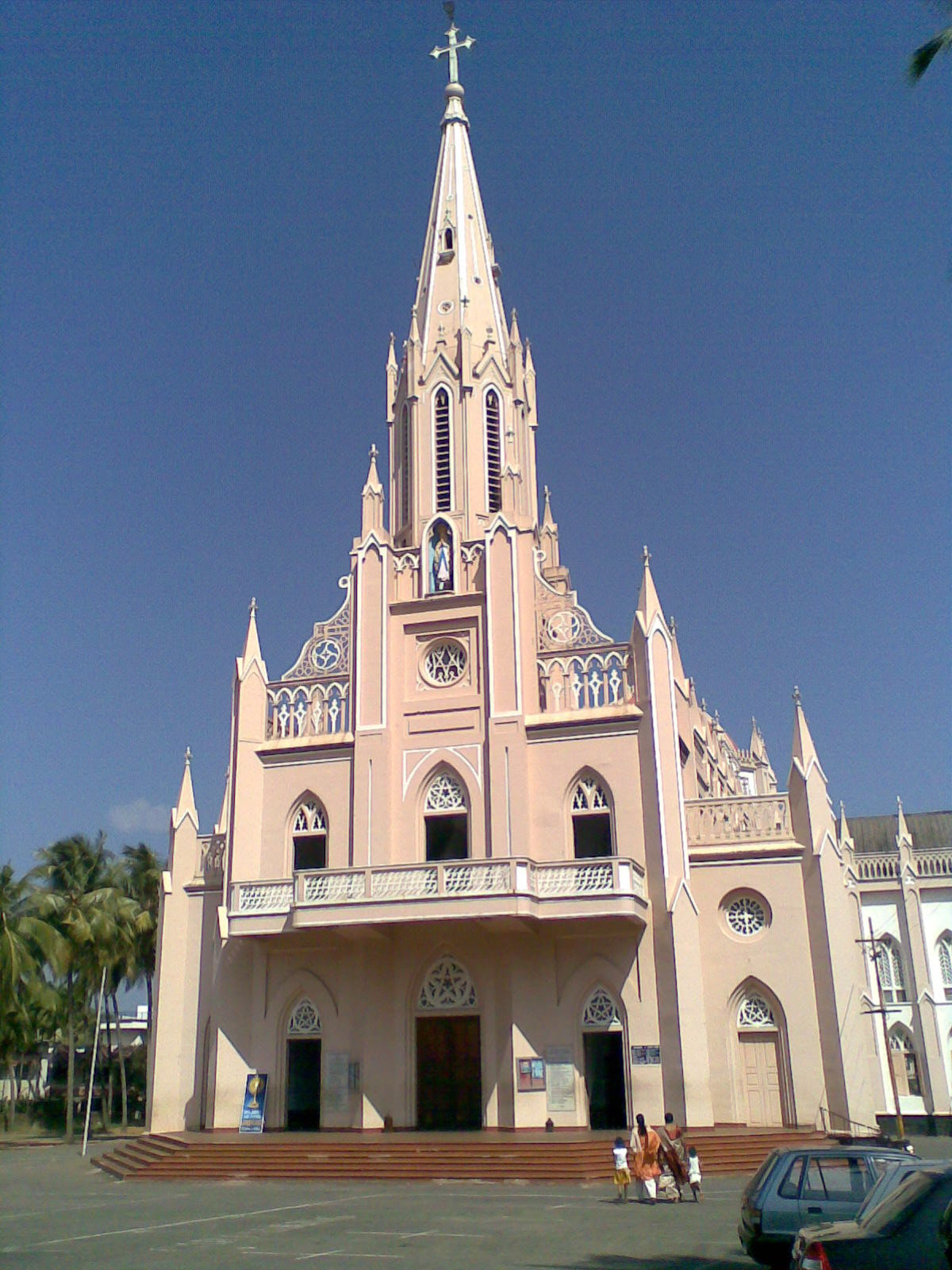
- Front facade of Our Lady of Lourdes Metropolitan Cathedral
- Our Lady of Lourdes Metropolitan Cathedral
- 10°31′23.18″N 76°13′39.75″E
- Location: Thrissur, Kerala
- Country: India
- Denomination: Syro-Malabar Catholic
- Website: lourdescathedralthrissur.com

History
- Status: Cathedral
- Dedication: Our Lady of Lourdes

Architecture
- Functional status: Active
- Style: Gothic
- Completed: 1957; 69 years ago

Administration
- Archdiocese: Syro-Malabar Catholic Archdiocese of Thrissur

Clergy
- Archbishop: Mar Andrews Thazhath
- Vicar: Rev. Fr. Jose Vallooran
- Priest: Fr. Godwin Kizhakkoodan

Our Lady of Lourdes Metropolitan Cathedral , is one of the biggest churches in Kerala, is located in the heart of Thrissur City in the state of Kerala, India. Dedicated to Our Lady of Lourdes, the Syro-Malabar Catholic church is noted for its imposing interior. The main attraction is an underground shrine, considered a masterpiece of architectural design. Fr John Maliekkal is said to have planned and constructed this church. The exterior of the church features an Indo-European facade with white spires. The centenary of this church was celebrated during the historic visit of Pope John Paul II to Thrissur City in 1986. The cathedral church attracts thousands of pilgrims every month.

== Landmarks ==
- 1814: The first Syrian Catholic Church was founded in Thrissur city; the Marth-Mariyam Valiyapalli erected in 1814 was occupied by Syrian traditionalists under Mar Elias Mellus Archbishop (For this and following material.)
- 1885: Establishment of our Lady of Lourdes Church for the Latin Catholics ( Roman Catholics of Latin Rite ).
- 1887: Erection of the vicariate Apostolic of Trichur (20 May) with Mgr. Adolphus Medlycott as the first Vicar Apostolic.
- 1891: Elevation of the Lourdes Church as the Cathedral of the Vicariate of Trichur in exchange for a 1875 Syrian Catholics for Latin Catholics.
- 1896: Elevation of Mgr. John Menachery (Cathedral Vicar) to the Status of Vicar Apostolic.
- 1923: Elevation of Trichur as Diocese, with Mar Francis Vazhappilly as the first Bishop. Restoration of Indian Syro-Malabar Catholic Hierarchy
- 1934: Blessing of the chapel near main gate.
- 1952: Blessing of the chapel in the crypt 75’x 50’
- 1957: Blessing of the present cathedral by Mar George Alappatt.
- 1986: Episcopal consecration of the statue of Our Lady of Lourdes. A solemn conclusion of centenary celebration of the diocese and of its cathedral by Pope John Paul II during His Apostolic Visit to Thrissur 7 February
- 1995: Elevation of Trichur as a Metropolitan See, and Lourdes Church as the Metropolitan Cathedral
- 1996: Blessing of the Centenary Hall
- 1997: Installation of Mar Jacob Thoomkuzhy Metropolitan Archbishop of Trichur
- 1998: Blessing of Cemetery Chapel.
- 2004: Episcopal ordination of Mar Andrews Thazhath, the Third Archbishop of Trichur.
- 2010: Episcopal ordination of Mar Raphael Thattil, the second Auxiliary Bishop of Trichur
- 2017: Episcopal ordination of Mar Tony Neelankavil, the third Auxiliary Bishop of Trichur

== Gallery ==
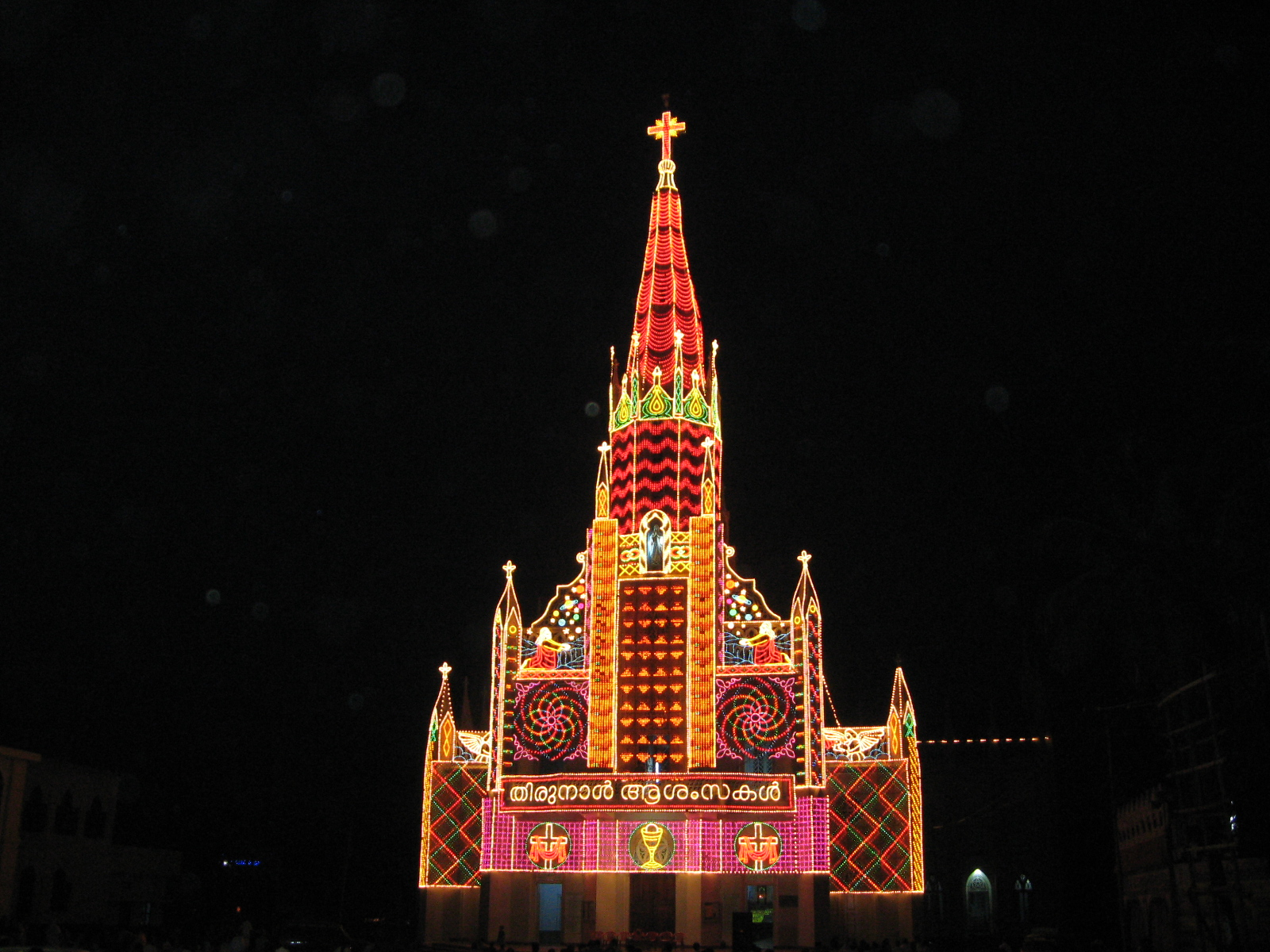
Cathedral illuminated at night for the annual parish feast

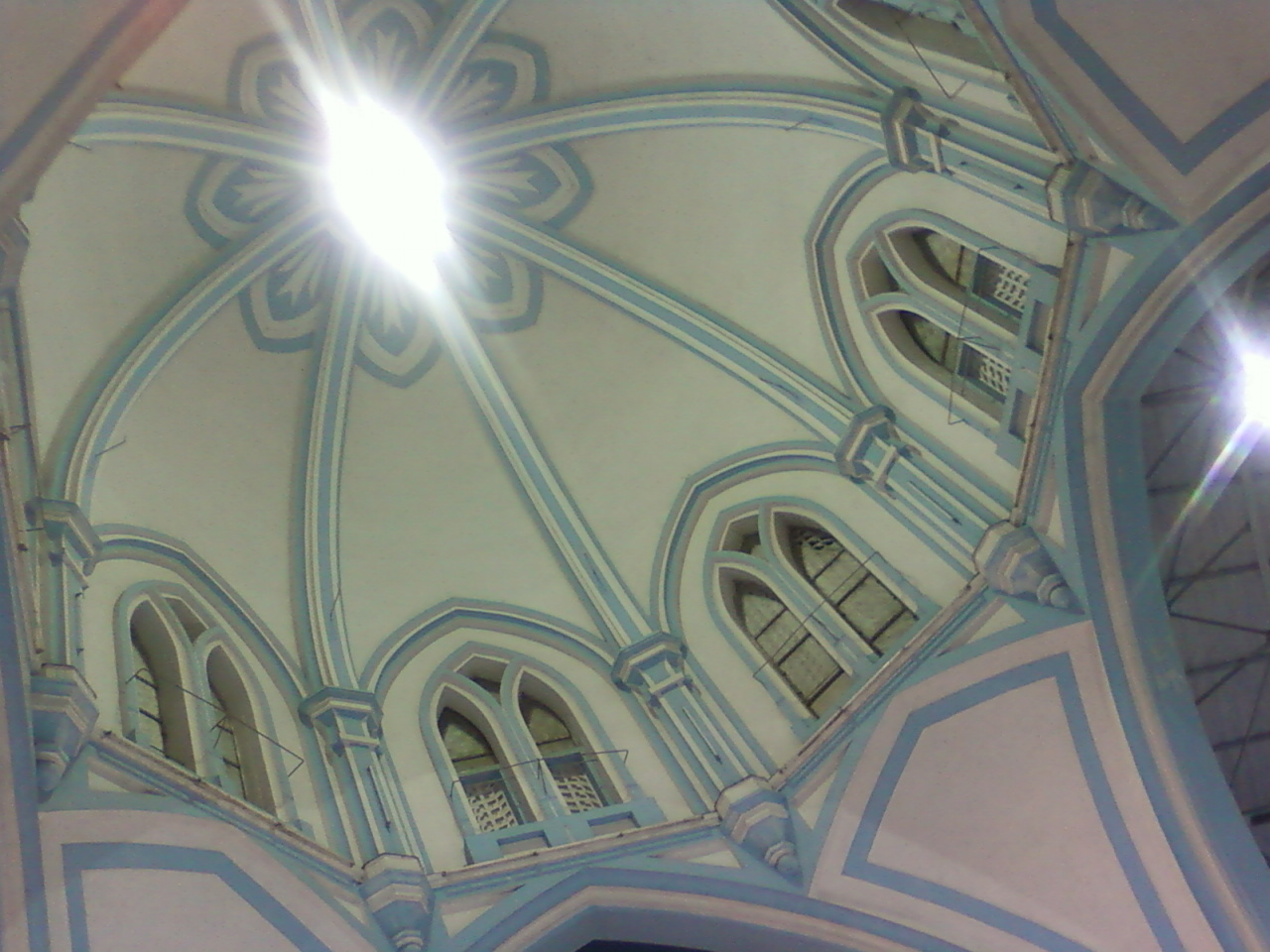
Inside view of the dome

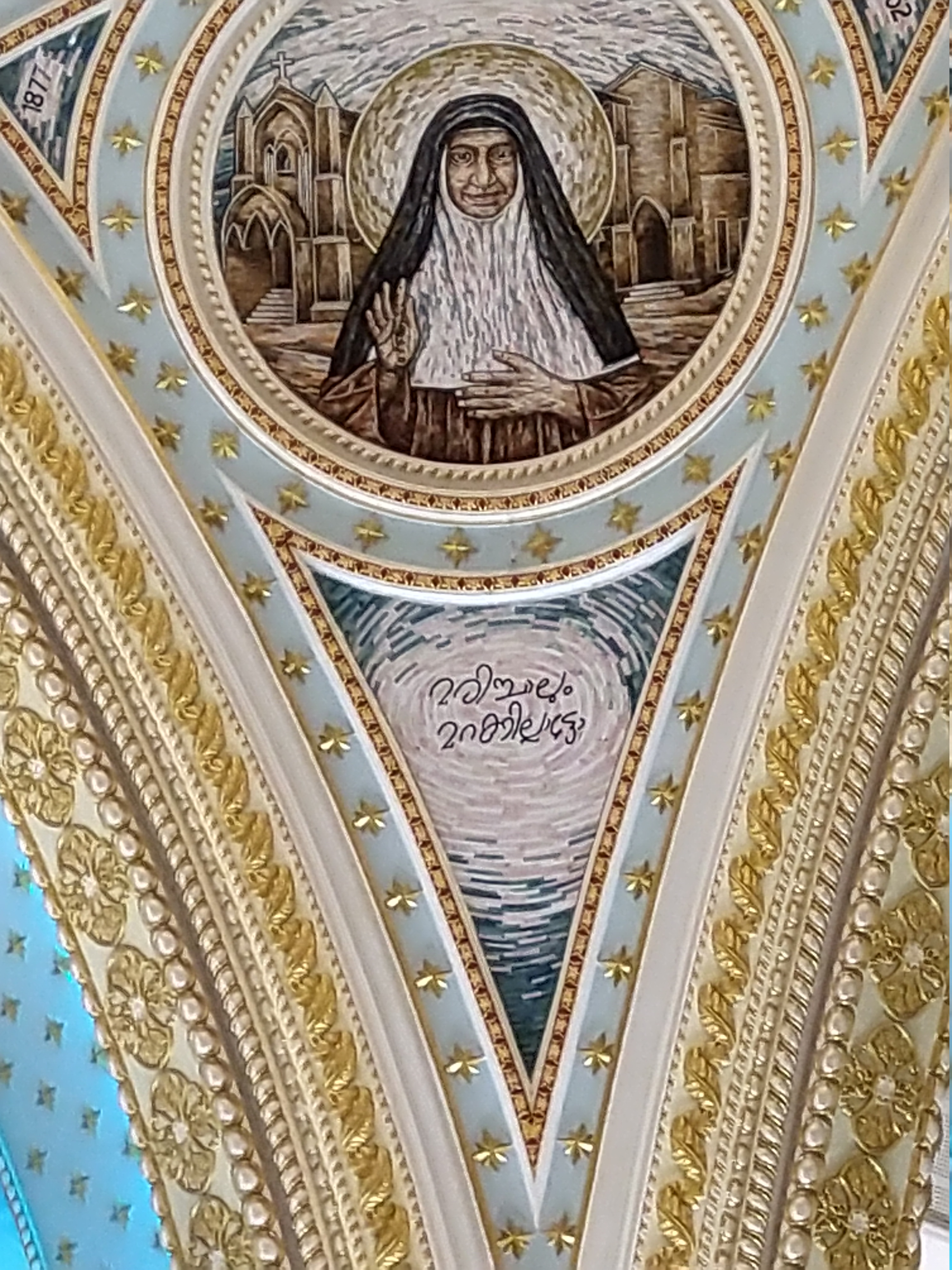

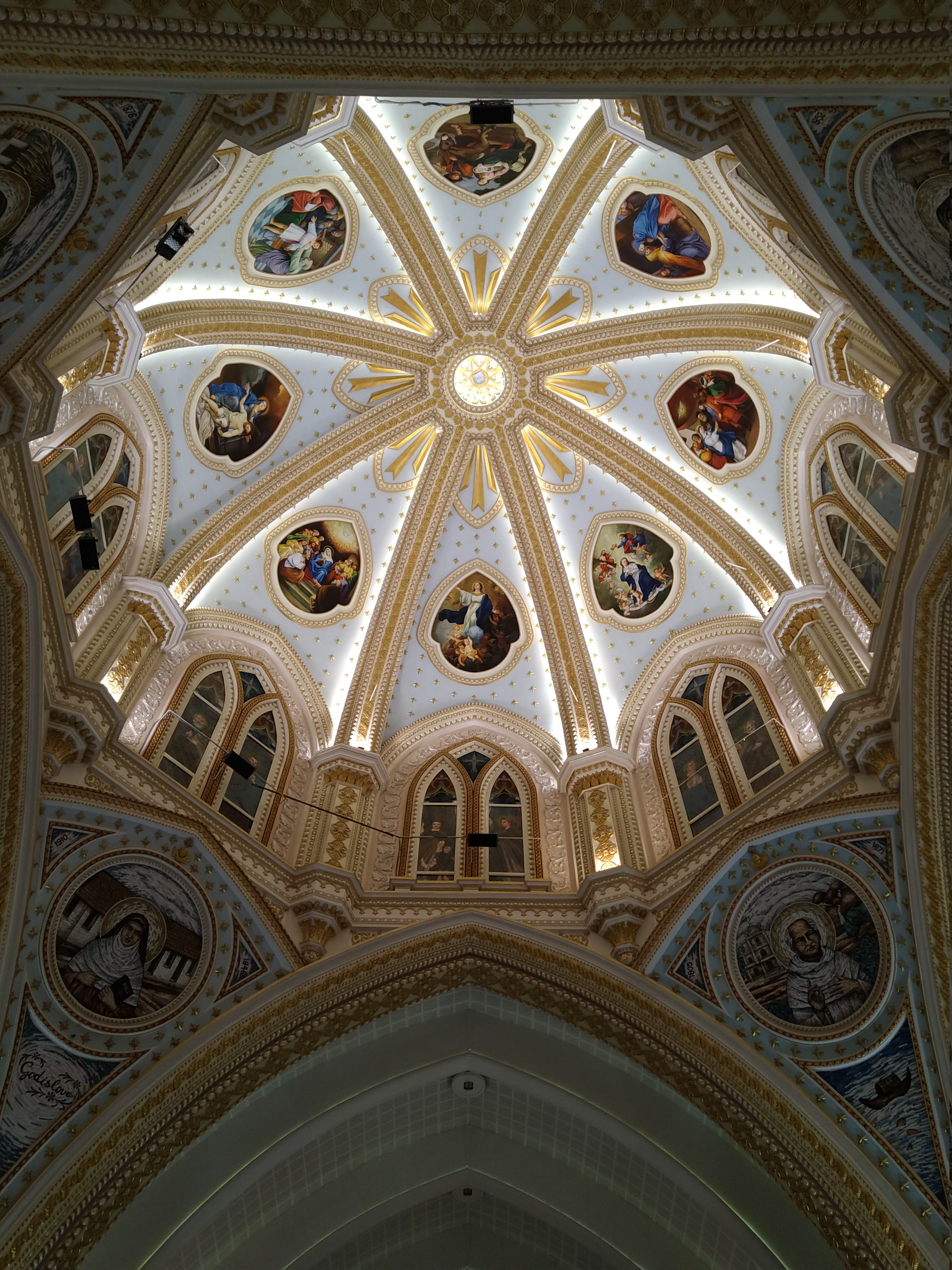
Dome above altara

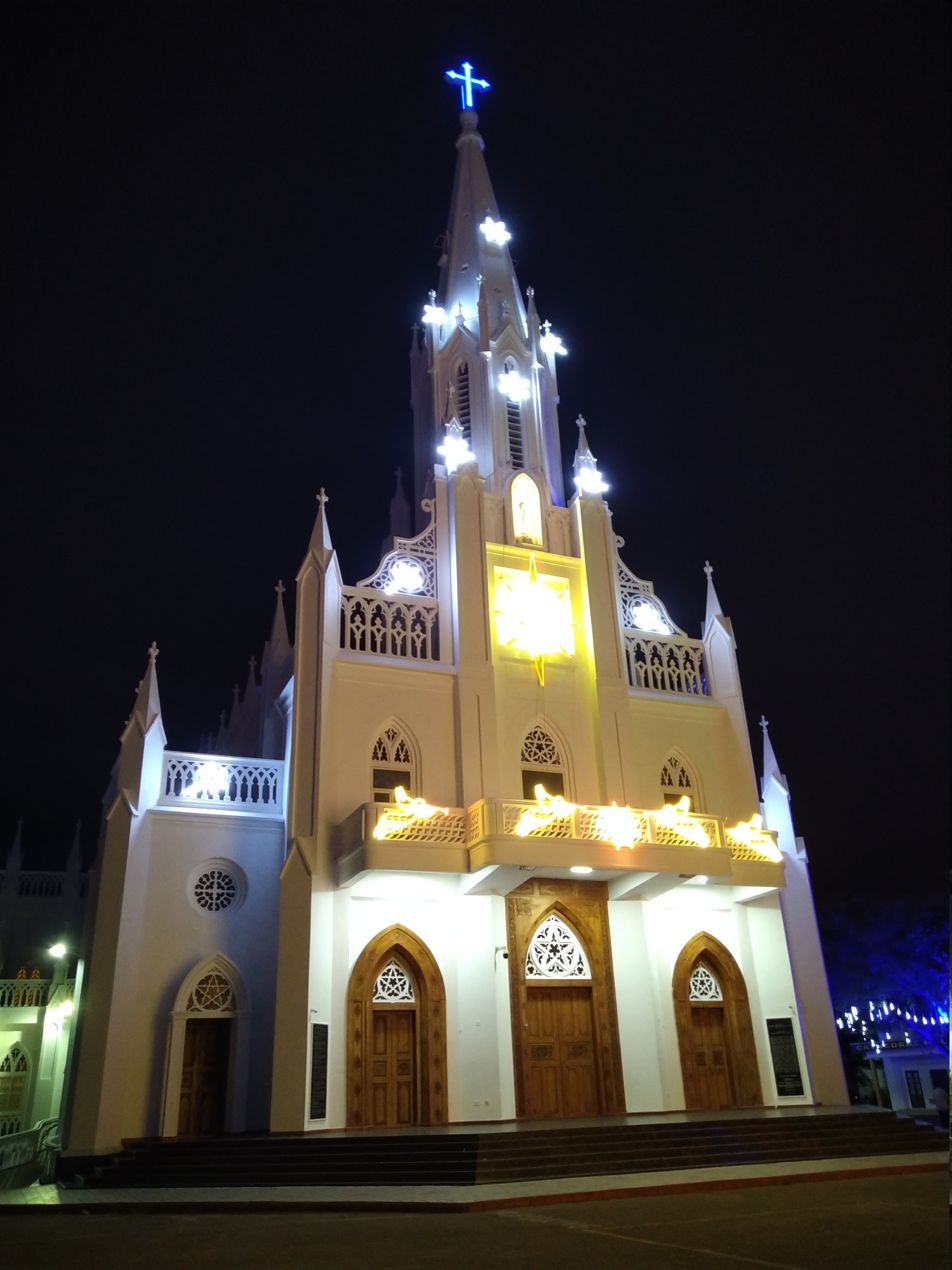
Christmas-New Year's decorations

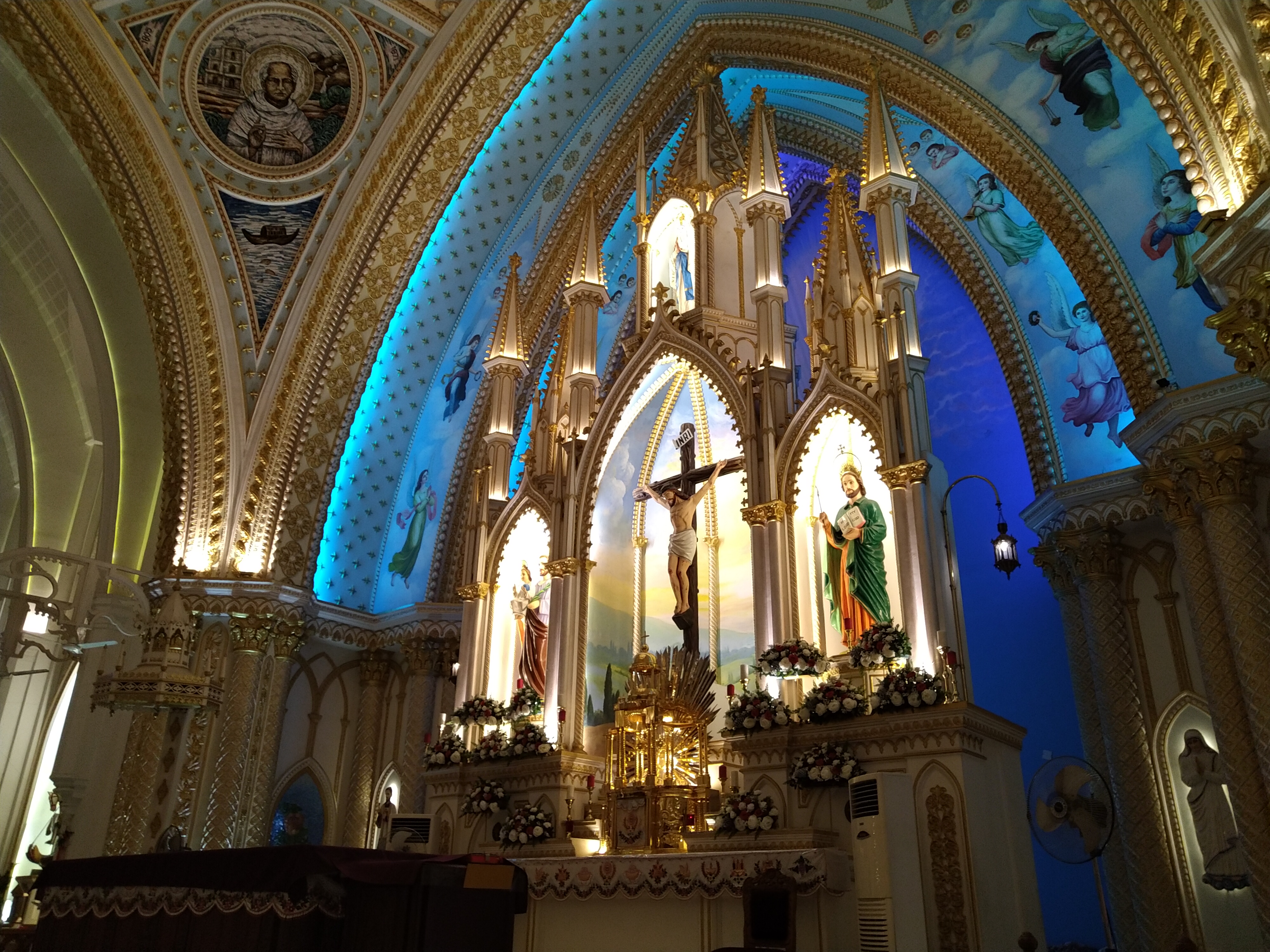
Altar

== See also ==
- Roman Catholicism in India
- Christianity in India
