= Thomas Kurialacherry =

Catholic bishop from Kerala, India (1873–1925)

Mar Thomas Kurialachery Blessed
- Bishop of Changanacherry
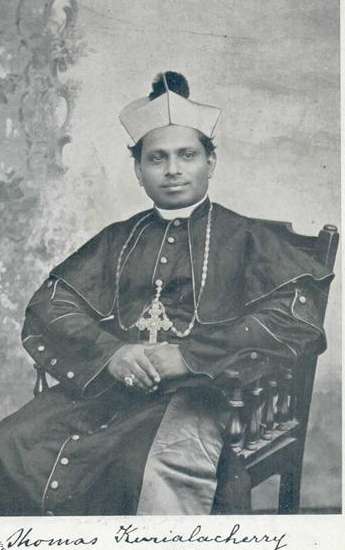
- Appointed: 11 August 1896
- Installed: 30 August 1911
- Term ended: 2 June 1925
- Predecessor: Matthew Makil
- Successor: James Kalassery

Orders
- Ordination: 27 May 1899 by Cardinal Cassantha
- Consecration: by Archbishop Wladyslaw Michal Zaleski

Personal details
- Born: 14 January 1873 Champakulam
- Died: 2 June 1925 (aged 52)
- Buried: Changanassery St Mary's Metropolitan Cathedral Church

Sainthood
- Venerated in: Catholic Church

Venerable Thomas Kurialacherry (14 January 1873 – 2 June 1925) was a Catholic bishop from Kerala. Kurialacherry was a member of the Syro-Malabar Catholic Church, had his ordination in May 1899 from Cardinal Cassantha, and was bishop of what would become the Archdiocese of Changanacherry. He is also known for establishing the prestigious SB College Changanasserry, one of the oldest Institutions of Higher Education in Kerala, in 1922.

== Life ==
Thomas was born on 14 January 1873 as the sixth child of Accamma and Chackochen of the Kurialacherry family in Champakulam, Kerala. After his primary education, he joined St. Ephrem school in Mannanam.

In 1891, the vicariate of Kottayam was renamed Changanassery where its headquarters was moved to.

Kurialacherry's seminary education was at the Propaganda Fide in Rome. During the nine years he spent in Rome he excelled and became prefect of the seminarians. He was ordained on 27 March 1899 by Cardinal Cassantha at the Basilica of St. John in Lateran. After his ordination, he remained some time in Italy and was a guest for some days of Cardinal Giuseppe Sarto, Patriarch of Venice, who later became Pope Pius X.

In 1908, he founded the Sisters of the Adoration of the Blessed Sacrament (SABS). Kurialacherry was appointed as the apostolic vicar of the Changanassery vicariate. He was consecrated on 3 December 1911 in Kandy, Ceylon.

In 1922 he established St. Berchmans College in Changanassery. In 1923, Pope Pius XI established the Diocese of Changanacherry, suffragan of the Archdiocese of Ernakulam.

In 1925 he went to Rome where he died on 2 June 1925 in Rome. Kurialacherry was a strong advocate for the education of women. Bishop Kurialacherry College for Women in Amalagiri is named after him.

== Canonization ==
In 1935, ten years after his death, his cause of canonization was initiated giving him the title "Servant of God". On 2 April 2011 Pope Benedict XVI, in an audience with Cardinal Angelo Amato, Prefect of the Congregation for the Causes of Saints, approved a statement saying that Bishop Kurialachery had lived a life of heroic virtue. This gave him the additional title of "Venerable".
