= John Menachery =

Indian bishop

His Excellency Mar John Menachery
- Vicar Apostolic of Thrissur
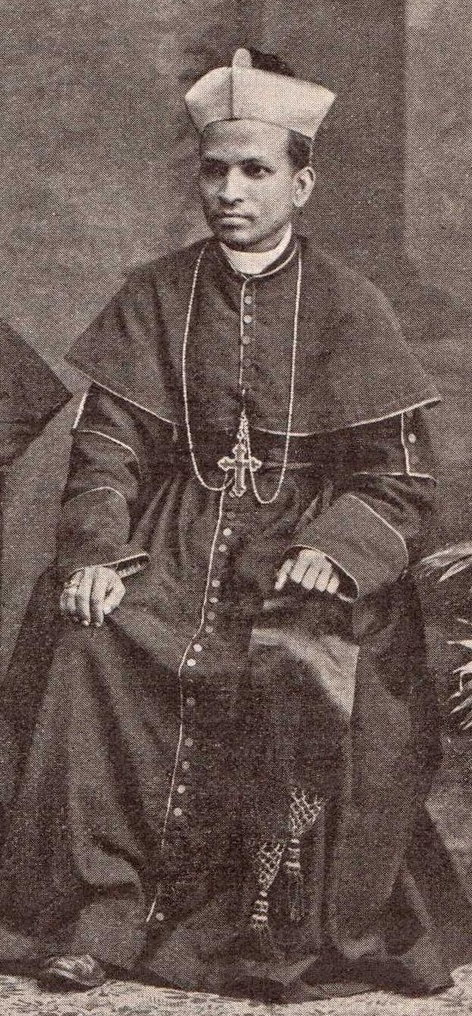
- Province: Kerala
- Diocese: Apostolic Vicariate of Thrissur
- See: Paralus
- Predecessor: Adolph Medlycott
- Successor: Francis Vazhapilly

Orders
- Ordination: 11 August 1883

Personal details
- Born: 12 December 1857 Njarackal, Travancore, British India (present-day Ernakulam district Kerala, India)
- Died: 19 December 1919
- Buried: Our Lady of Lourdes Metropolitan Cathedral, Thrissur
- Denomination: Syro-Malabar Catholic Church
- Occupation: Bishop

Mar John Menachery was the second Bishop of Apostolic Vicariate of Thrissur. He died in 1919 and was interred in the crypt of Our Lady of Lourdes Metropolitan Cathedral, Thrissur.
