= Paul Alappatt =

Indian Syro-Malabar bishop

Mar Paul Alappatt
- Eparch of Ramanathapuram
- Church: Syro-Malabar Catholic Church
- Archdiocese: Thrissur
- Diocese: Ramanathapuram
- Appointed: 18 January 2010
- Installed: 11 April 2010
- Predecessor: Office Established

Orders
- Ordination: 27 December 1987 by Joseph Kundukulam
- Consecration: 11 April 2010 by Andrews Thazhath, Jacob Thoomkuzhy, and Jacob Manathodath

Personal details
- Born: 21 April 1962 (age 64) Edathiruthy, Kerala

Paul Alappatt (born 21 April 1962) is a bishop of the Syro-Malabar Catholic Church in India who became the Eparch of Syro Malabar Eparchy of Ramanathapuram in 2010.

== Early life and priesthood ==
Mar Paul Alappatt was born to Varunny and Eliakutty Alappatt in Edathiruthy, Kerala on April 21, 1962. He attended Primary and Junior Schooling in the Syro-Malabar Catholic Archeparchy of Thrissur before he joined St. Mary's Minor Seminary on June 19, 1977, to begin his priestly formation. He then proceeded to go to the St. Thomas Apostolic Seminary in Kottayam for his Formation in Philosophical and Theological Studies. During his Seminary Formation, he also attended Osmania University. He was ordained on December 27, 1987, by Joseph Kundukulam as a priest for Thrissur. He also attended the Pontifical Gregorian University for a diploma in jurisprudence and also went to the Pontifical Oriental Institute for Eastern Canon Law.

He was appointed vice chancellor and judge in the Eparchial Tribunal in 1997 and chancellor in 1998. He held the role of chancellor for 9 years with dual roles as the public relations director and adjutant eparchial judge of the tribunal. He also served as a member of the Archdiocesan Finance Council, advisory committee of St. Thomas College, Thrissur, judicial vicar of the Metropolitan Tribunal of Trichur, judge of the Major Archiepiscopal Tribunal in Kakkanad, and convenor of the Archdiocesan Statues Committee. After his chancellorship, he served as the rector of the Minor Seminary in Trichur and vocation director. He also served as the promoter for the Causes of Augustine John Ukkenm, Joseph Vithayathil, and Venerable Euphrasia Eluvathingal.

== Episcopal ministry ==
=== Eparch of Ramanathapuram ===
After the erection of the Syro Malabar Eparchy of Ramanathapuram in 2010, Alappatt was elected as the Bishop of the newly erected eparchy on January 18, 2010. He was ordained bishop on April 11, 2010.
