= Eparchy of Hosur =

Eastern Catholic eparchy in Tamil Nadu, India

Eparchy of Hosur-Mylapore

Location
- Country: India
- Ecclesiastical province: Syro-Malabar Catholic Archeparchy of Trichur
- Headquarters: Chennai

Statistics
- Population: 50000+
- Schools: 1

Information
- Denomination: Catholic Church
- Sui iuris church: Syro-Malabar Catholic Church
- Rite: East Syriac Rite liturgy (Liturgy of Saints Addai and Mari, Mar Theodore of Mopsuestia and Mar Nestorius
- Established: 10 October 2017
- Cathedral: St. Antony's Syro‑Malabar Catholic Cathedral Church, Noothenchery
- Secular priests: 22
- Language: Tamil, Malayalam and English

Current leadership
- Pope: Leo XIV
- Major Archbishop: Mar Raphael Thattil
- Bishop: Mar Sebastian Pozholiparampil
- Metropolitan Archbishop: Mar Andrews Thazhath

Map
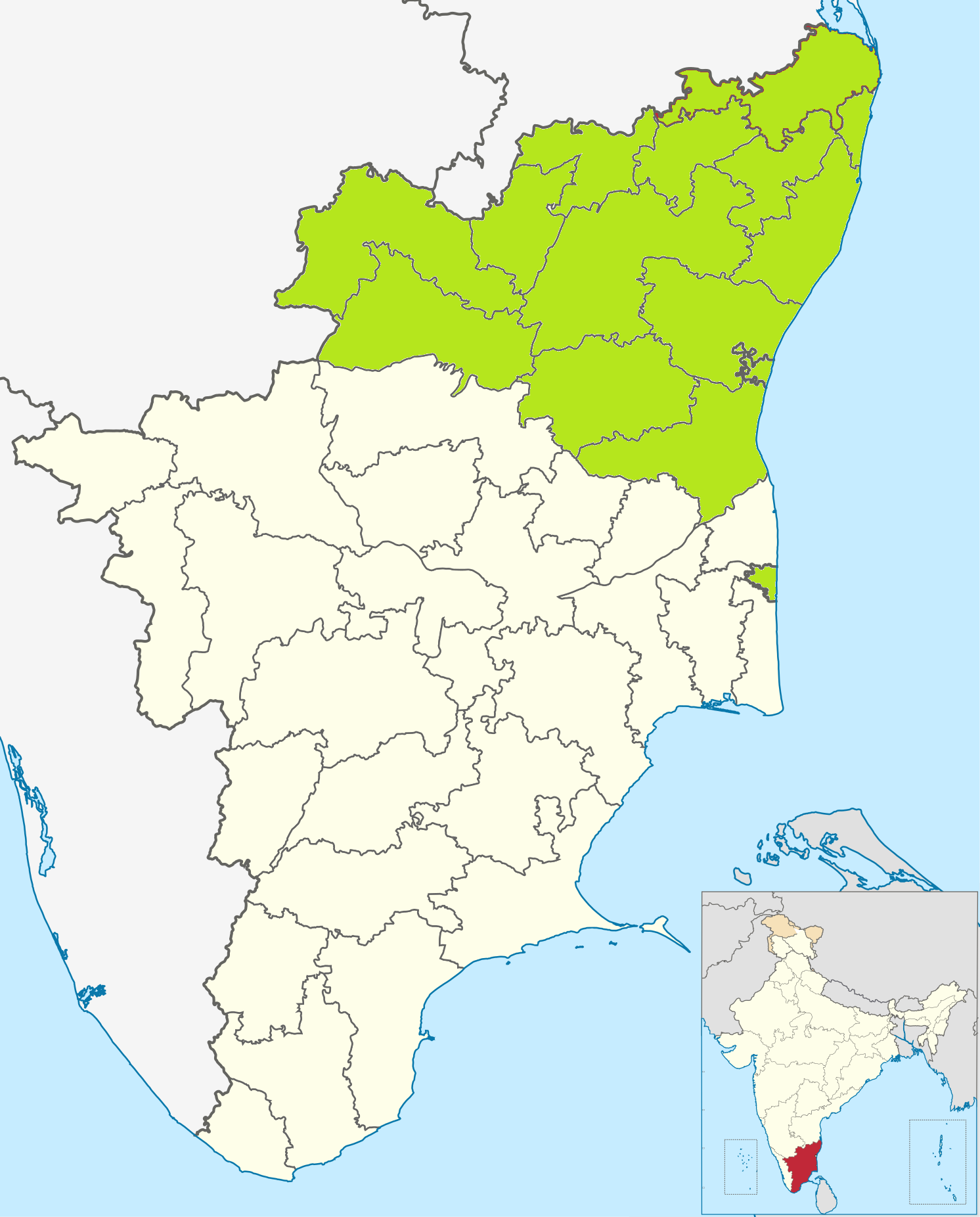

The Eparchy of Hosur-Mylapore is an Eastern Syriac Catholic eparchy headquartered in Tamil Nadu, India, under the Syro-Malabar Catholic Church. It was established by Pope Francis on 10 October 2017, and Mar Sebastian Pozholiparampil was appointed its first bishop. The cathedral is St. Antony's Syro-Malabar Catholic Cathedral Church at Noothenchery and the bishop's chancellory is at St. Thomas Pastoral Centre Ayanavaram.

The Syro Malabar Church is not a language-based community. It is an Oriental (East Syriac Rite) Catholic church, in full communion with the Church of Rome.

Before the creation of this Eparchy, the Chennai Mission was founded in 1981 to serve the Syro-Malabar community in Chennai (Madras). Priests from the Eparchy of Irinjalakkuda volunteered their time to travel to Chennai to provide members who were present in the cities for work and studies.

The Diocese of Hosur was blessed with a new priest, Fr. Shebin Chazhoor. He is from Perambur, St.Joseph Parish. He has completed his minor seminary at Irinjalakuda St.Paul's Minor Seminary. Later, he completed bph from Mary Matha Major Seminary, Thrissur. He took his BTh from Papal Seminary, Pune.

In 2025, the Major Archbishop of the Syro-Malabar Church made Eparchy of Hosur, a suffragan to the Archeparchy of Trichur.

== Parishes ==
Foranes and Parishes
| | Forane | Parishes |
|---|---|---|
| 1 | Noothencherry Forane | Noothenchery Neelankarai Gorimedu - Pondicherry Jaya Nagar - Pondicherry |
| 2 | Keelkattalai Forane | Keelkattalai St. Thomas Mount Pozhichallur Velacherry |
| 3 | Mogappair Forane | Mogappair Valasaravakkam Poonamallee Athipet Ambatur |
| 4 | Avadi Forane | IAF Avadi Kovilpathagai Pattabiram Vellore |
| 5 | Ayanavarm Forane | Ayanavaram Kodambakkam Mylapore Hosur |
| 6 | Perambur Forane | Perambur Thiruvottiyur Eranavoor Otteri |

== St. Antony's Cathedral, Noothenchery ==
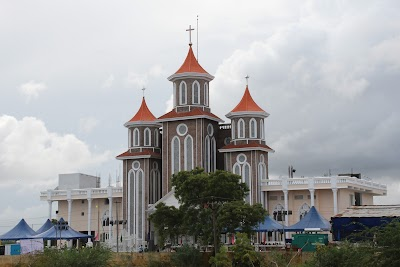
St. Antony's Cathedral seen from a distance

Saint Antony's Syro-Malabar Catholic Church in Noothenchery is the cathedral of The Diocese of Hosur. The Eparchy of Hosur encompasses the northern region of Tamil Nadu, hosting approximately 50,000 Syro-Malabar faithful in Chennai and an additional 15,000 in nearby cities such as Chengalpattu Dharmapuri, Vellore, and Pondicherry. This community's pastoral needs are overseen by 22 priests from the Eparchy of Irinjalakuda, serving across 44 pastoral centers. Furthermore, the region benefits from the dedicated service of 73 women religious, who administer eight schools and engage in various charitable endeavours.
