= Basilica of Our Lady of Dolours, Thrissur =

Basilica of Our Lady of Dolours
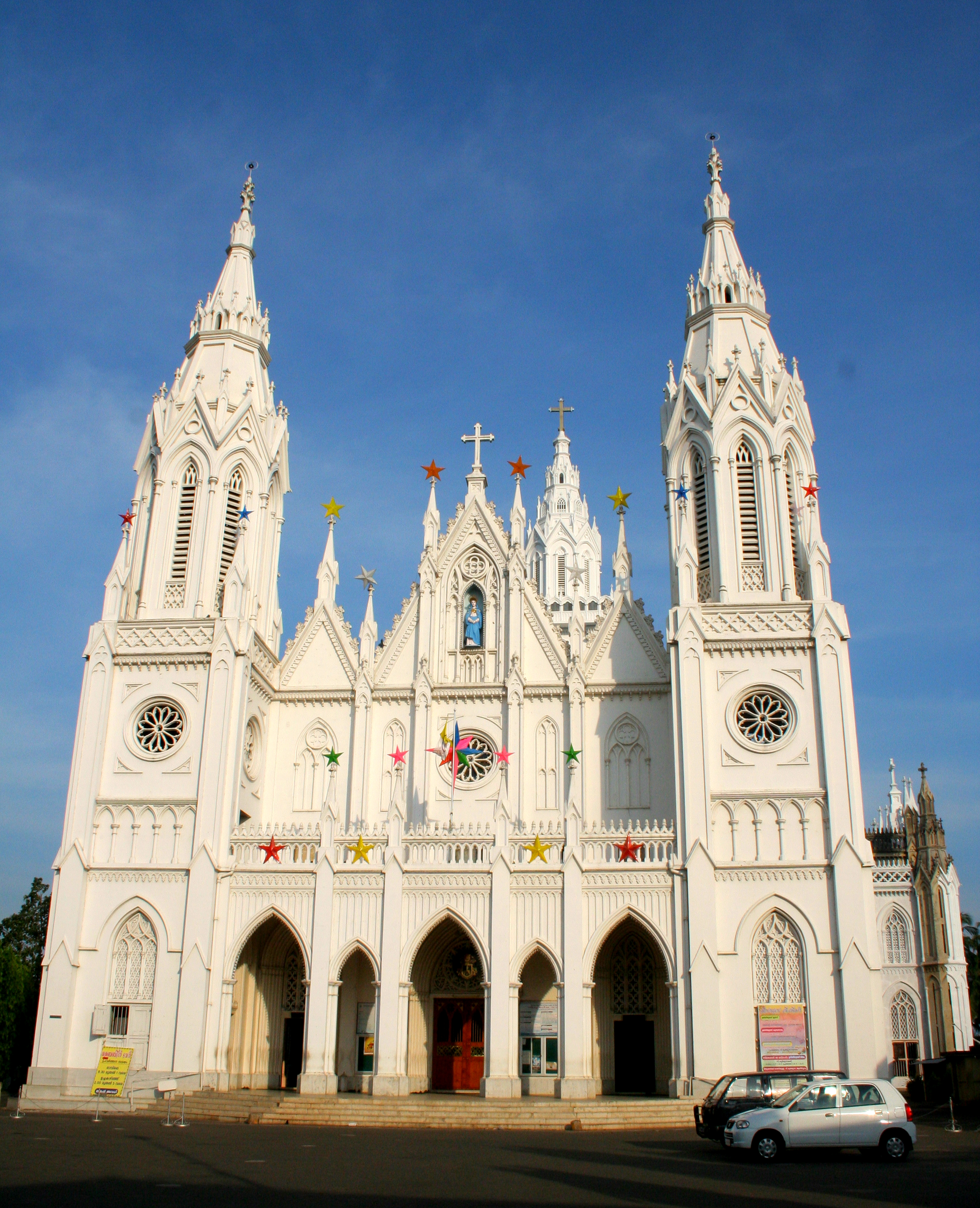
- Front of the Basilica

- Location within Kerala Location within India
- 10.521°N 76.218°E
- Location: Thrissur, Kerala
- Country: India
- Denomination: Syro-Malabar Catholic Church

History
- Status: Minor Basilica
- Founded: 1929

Architecture
- Architect: Ambrose Gounder
- Style: Gothic

Administration
- District: Thrissur District
- Archdiocese: Syro-Malabar Catholic Archdiocese of Thrissur

Clergy
- Archbishop: Andrews Thazhath

Our Lady of Dolours Basilica alias Puthenpally (Malayalam: പുത്തൻപള്ളി, meaning: New Church) is a minor basilica of the Syro-Malabar Catholic Church in Thrissur City in Kerala, India. It is the tallest church in India and has the tallest continuous church tower in Asia. It is famous for its Gothic style architecture. Built in fine Indo-Gothic style with an area of 25,000 square feet (2,300 m^{2}), it has soaring belfries at the entrance, double-storeyed aisles all along the nave and transepts, and eleven altars, five on either side of the main one. It is the largest church in Kerala and its exuberant interior decorations include fine specimens of murals, icons and statues of saints, and scenes from the Scriptures.

== History ==
It is a center for the St. Thomas Christians in the area (now the Syro-Malabar Catholic Church) for decades. In 1874, the Chaldean Catholic bishop Elias Mellus arrived in India at the request of the Syro-Malabar Christians and convinced a large part of the Christian community to accept him as their bishop. The group that followed Mellus was based at this church and eventually separated from the Catholic hierarchy, forming what is now known as the Chaldean Syrian Church. In response the Syro-Malabar Catholics constructed a new building in 1929. The original church was renamed the Mart Mariam Big Church, and is now the cathedral of the Chaldean Syrian Church. The current building is known as Puthanpally (New Church) for this reason.

The construction of this church, the largest church in India by both area and height was done in different phases, starting from the year 1929. The two front towers are of 146 feet (45 m) height each and the central tower called the Bible Tower of 260 feet (79 m) height makes this church the 2nd tallest in Asia according to how its measured. Even though the central spire on the dome of the INC Central Temple in the Philippines reaches a total height of 285 feet (87 m) (which includes the 23 feet (7.0 m) raised foundation), Our Lady of Dolours Basilica's Bible Tower is widely considered the tallest church tower in Asia when measured as a continuous vertical structure from the base to the apex. Completion of the towers was an architectural challenge. A few experts from Tamil Nadu were brought over. The architect who completed the church was Ambrose Gounder.

== Architecture ==
The basilica is designed in the Early Gothic architectural style and faces west. The principal façade features a spacious forecourt and is flanked by two bell towers, each rising approximately 146 feet (45 m). At the rear of the church stands the Bible Tower (Pallimanigopuram), which rises to a height of 260 feet (79 m) and is among the tallest church towers in Asia.

The façade is characterized by Gothic elements including pointed arches, pinnacles, circular stained-glass windows, and ornamental detailing. A statue of the Blessed Virgin Mary, the patroness of the basilica, is positioned above the main entrance between the twin towers, while a large cross crowns the central section of the façade. Five arched entranceways, approached by a broad flight of steps, provide access to the church complex.

== Interior ==
The church has an overall length of approximately 390 feet (119 m) and an internal width of about 60 feet (18 m). Built on a cruciform plan, it has a total floor area of approximately 25,000 square feet (2,323 m^{2}). Upon entering, visitors pass through a 16,200-square-foot (1,505 m^{2}) hall supported by 32 large black pillars finished with marble chips.

The interior includes galleries with a combined area of about 11,700 square feet (1,087 m^{2}), which extend around the nave and are accessible by staircases located on all four sides of the church. Marble-finished surfaces are used extensively throughout the interior decoration.

== Main Altar ==
The main altar is approximately 100 feet (30 m) high. At its centre is a representation of Our Lady of Sorrows (Mater Dolorosa) holding the body of Jesus after the Crucifixion. Statues of the Archangels Michael and Raphael are placed on either side, while figures representing the Twelve Apostles are located below.

The sanctuary (Madbaha) occupies an area of approximately 900 square feet (84 m^{2}). It contains an episcopal throne with carved ornamentation. Behind the main altar is a perpetual adoration chapel covering approximately 2,400 square feet (223 m^{2}), which serves as the church's permanent Eucharistic adoration centre.

== Relics associated with Pope John Paul II ==
The basilica preserves the episcopal throne and pulpit (bema) used by Pope John Paul II during his pastoral visit to Thrissur on 7 February 1986. The Pope's public gathering was held at the present-day Shaktan Thampuran Nagar, where he addressed a large congregation.

Following the visit, both the throne and the pulpit were transferred to the basilica and are preserved near the main altar as commemorative relics marking the Pope's visit to Kerala.

== Bible Tower ==
The Bible Tower (Pallimanigopuram), rising to a height of 260 feet (79 m), is one of the prominent landmarks of Thrissur. It was blessed and inaugurated on 7 January 2004 by Cardinal Ignace Moussa I Daoud, then Prefect of the Congregation for the Eastern Churches. On 3 December 2006, Archbishop Pedro López Quintana, Apostolic Nuncio to India, dedicated the tower for public use.

The tower includes observation galleries that provide panoramic views of Thrissur city. Its interior contains displays illustrating themes from the Old Testament, the New Testament, the history of Christianity in Kerala, and the mission of Saint Thomas the Apostle. Various artistic media—including wood carvings, stained glass, metalwork, oil paintings, terracotta sculptures, and murals—depict biblical narratives, the life of Jesus Christ, the ministry of the Apostles, and the apostolic mission of Saint Thomas in India. Works by nationally recognized artists are also exhibited within the tower. Perpetual Adoration Centre

In 1987, Cardinal Duraisamy Simon Lourdusamy, then Prefect of the Congregation for the Oriental Churches, proposed the establishment of a perpetual Eucharistic adoration centre in Thrissur as a memorial marking the centenary of the Archdiocese of Thrissur. Acting on this proposal, Archbishop Joseph Kundukulam established a perpetual adoration centre on the southern side of the basilica on 23 August 1987 under the direct administration of the archdiocese. A permanent Eucharistic adoration chapel was subsequently constructed behind the basilica and was blessed by Archbishop Kundukulam on 23 April 1989.

The centre was established to promote Eucharistic devotion, Marian spirituality, and the ministry of reconciliation. It functions as a place for perpetual Eucharistic adoration and attracts pilgrims who visit for prayer, meditation, and the Sacrament of Reconciliation.

== Dome ==
A large octagonal dome rises above the crossing where the four arms of the cruciform church intersect. Supported by pillars on all four sides, the dome is decorated externally with ornamental architectural elements and stained-glass windows.

The pendentives beneath the dome depict the Four Evangelists together with their traditional symbols. The interior surfaces of the dome feature artistic representations of Our Lady of Sorrows and the Seven Sorrows of Mary.

== Murals and sculptures ==
The basilica contains extensive murals, relief sculptures, and painted decorations illustrating biblical themes and events from Christian tradition.

Above the main entrance is a depiction of the Holy Trinity. Relief panels representing the Stations of the Cross are positioned above the doors and windows along the nave. Large murals on either side of the sanctuary portray the Miracle of the Feeding of the Five Thousand and the Assumption of the Blessed Virgin Mary.

The interior of the central dome depicts scenes associated with the Seven Sorrows of Mary, including the Prophecy of Simeon, the Flight into Egypt, the Finding of the Child Jesus in the Temple, Mary's meeting with Jesus on the way to Calvary, the Crucifixion, the Pietà, and the Burial of Jesus. Images of the Four Evangelists—Matthew, Mark, Luke, and John—are also incorporated into the decorative programme. The ceilings above the side altars contain paintings illustrating the lives and symbols of various saints.

== Replica of Michelangelo's Pietà ==
The basilica houses a replica of Michelangelo's Pietà in the south wing. The original Carrara marble sculpture, created by the Italian Renaissance artist Michelangelo between 1498 and 1499, is preserved in St. Peter's Basilica, Vatican City.

The sculpture depicts the Virgin Mary holding the body of Jesus after the Crucifixion. The title Pietà, derived from the Italian word for "pity" or "compassion," refers to the theme of the Virgin's sorrow and compassion.

== Statue of the Infant Jesus ==
A carved statue of the Infant Jesus (Unnisho) is located in the south wing of the basilica. It was blessed by Archbishop Jacob Thoomkuzhy, Archbishop of Thrissur, on 1 May 1999.

The iconography of the statue incorporates several symbolic elements. The globe beneath the Infant Jesus signifies Christ's universal lordship, while the crown and mantle represent his roles as King, Priest, and Prophet. The raised right hand is depicted in a traditional gesture of blessing, symbolizing the Holy Trinity. Additional decorative elements, including a dove representing the Holy Spirit and symbols associated with the Blessed Virgin Mary, further express themes central to Christian theology and Marian devotion.Bold

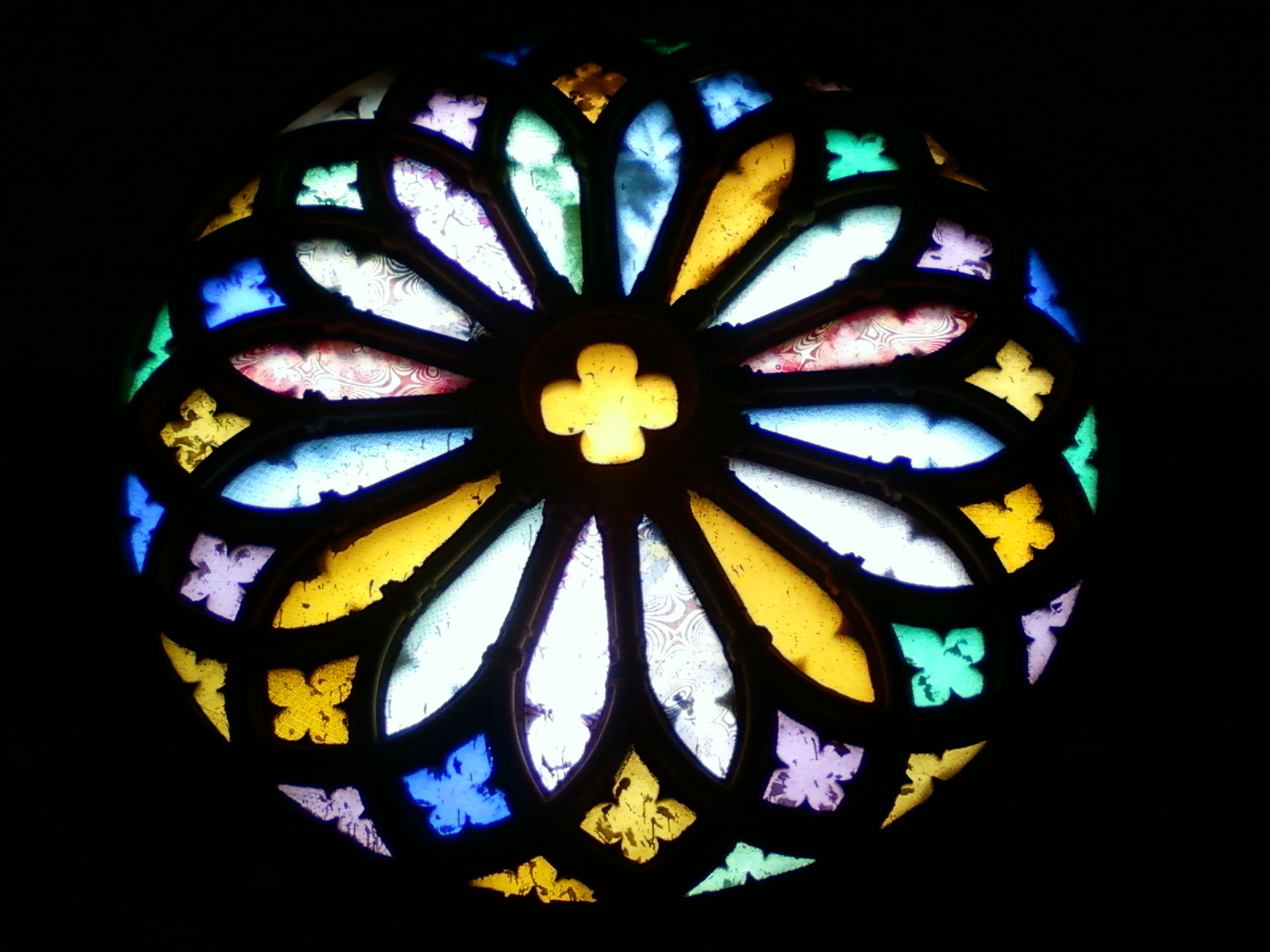
Rose window

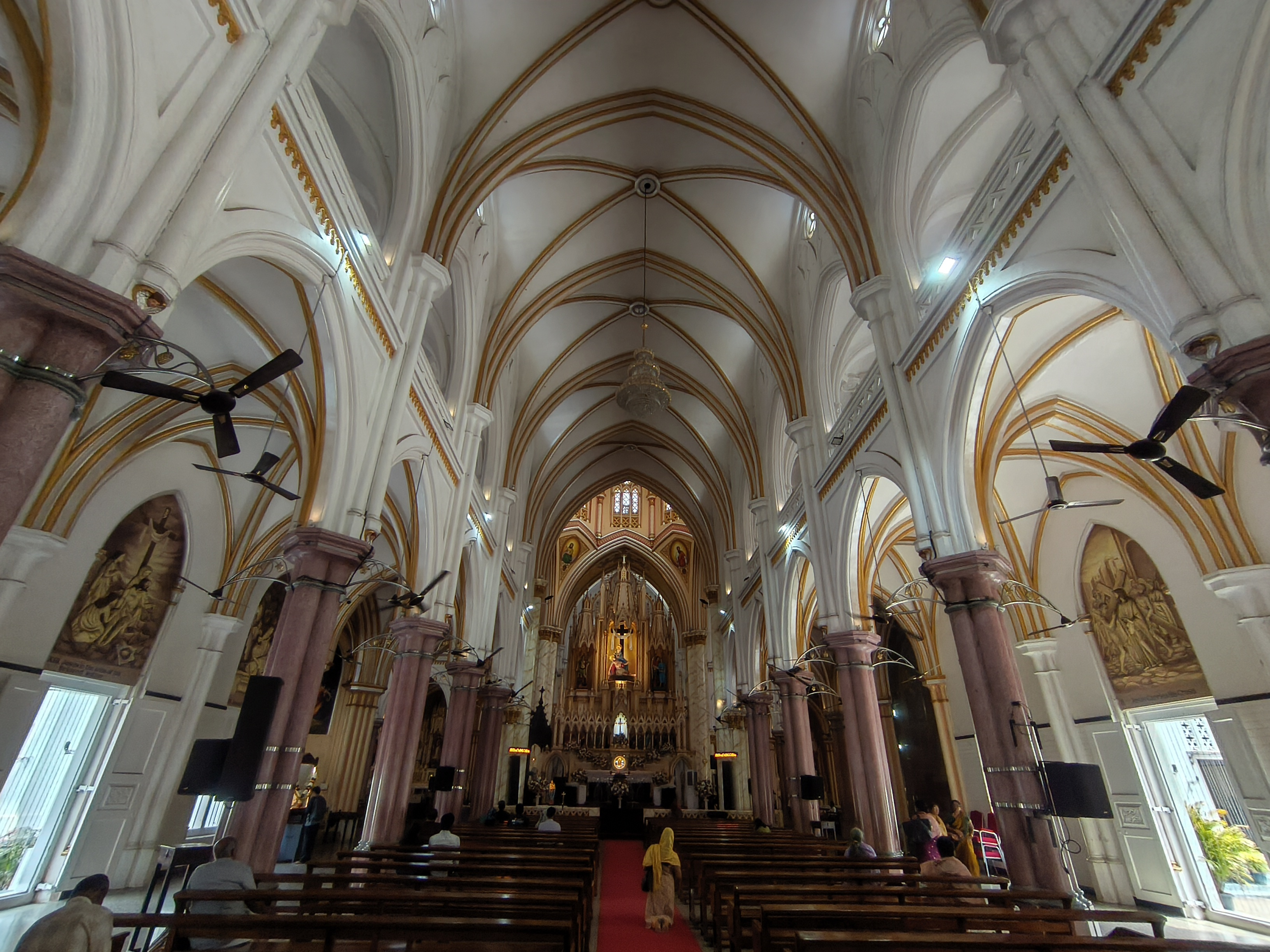
Inner View of Church.

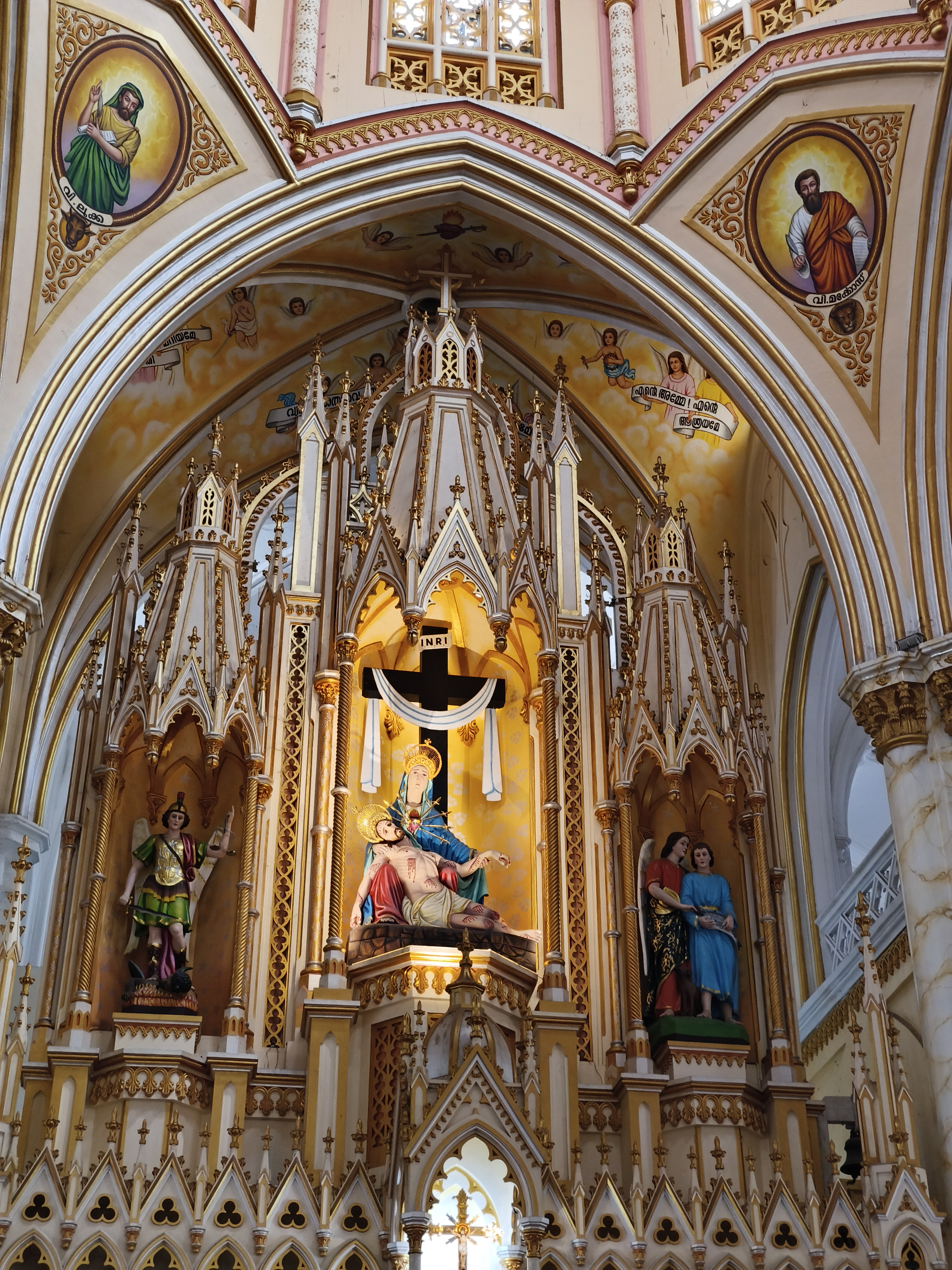
The main altar

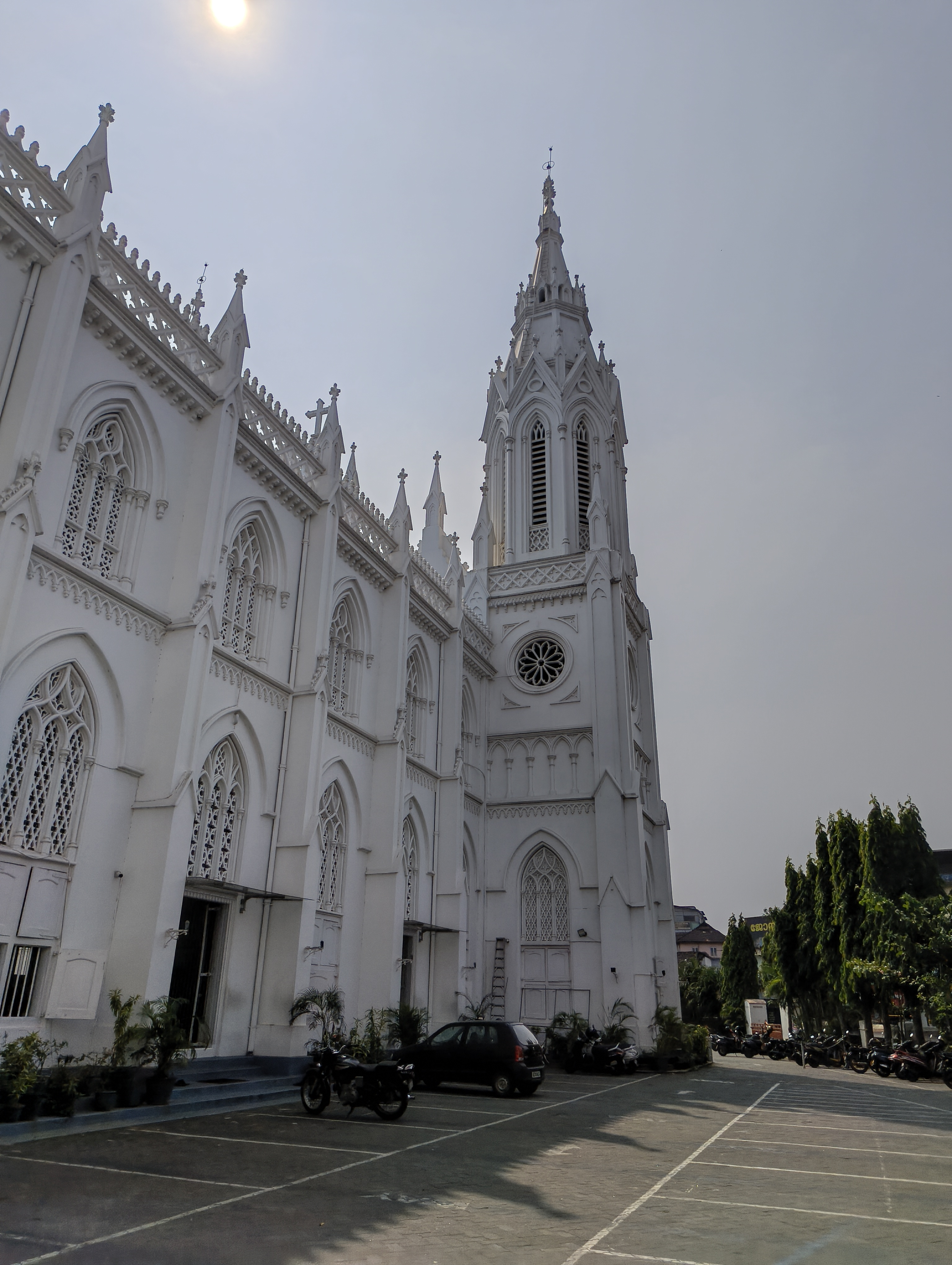
The back view of Basillica.

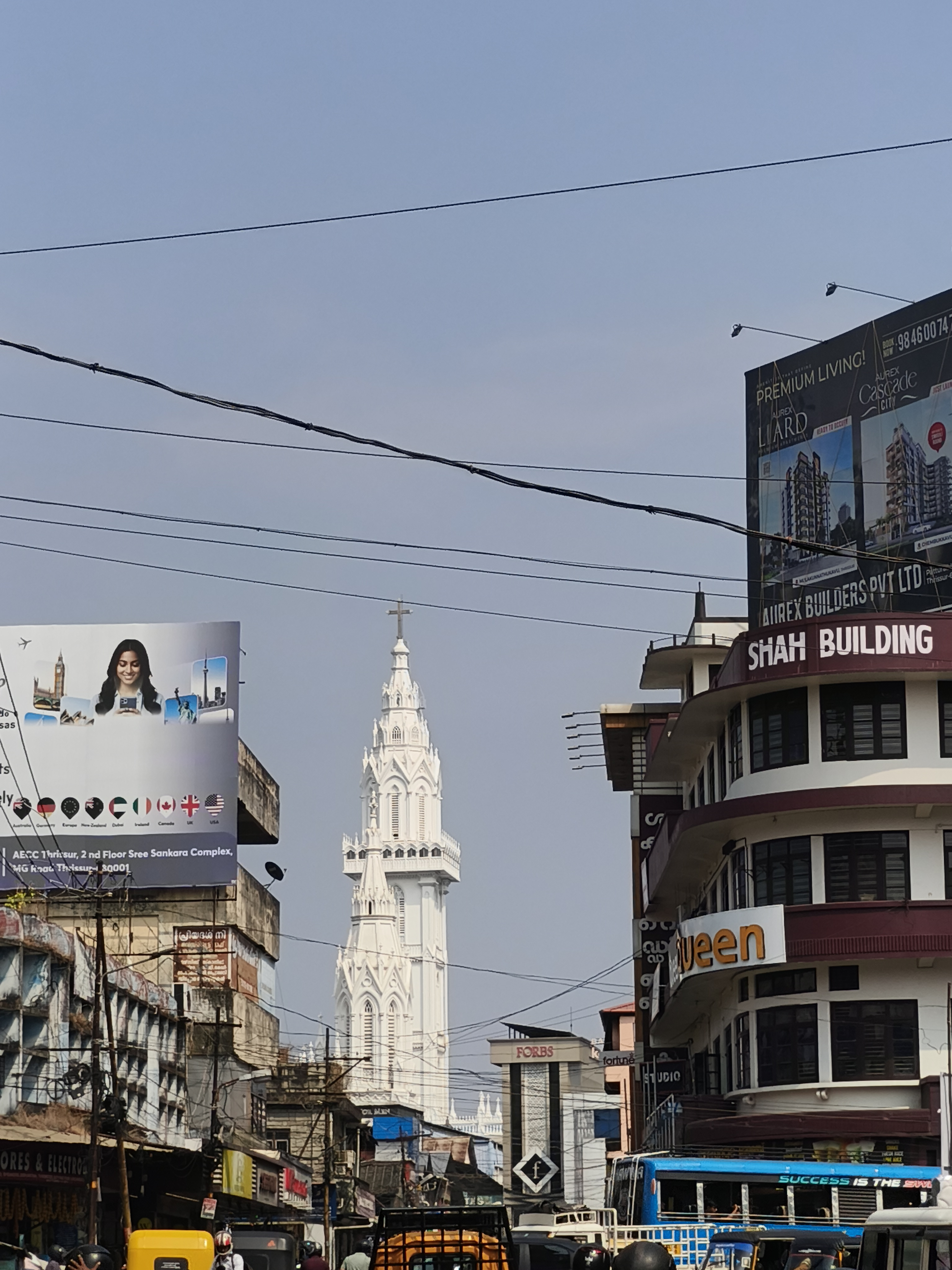
View of the church as seen from the National Highway in Thrissur.

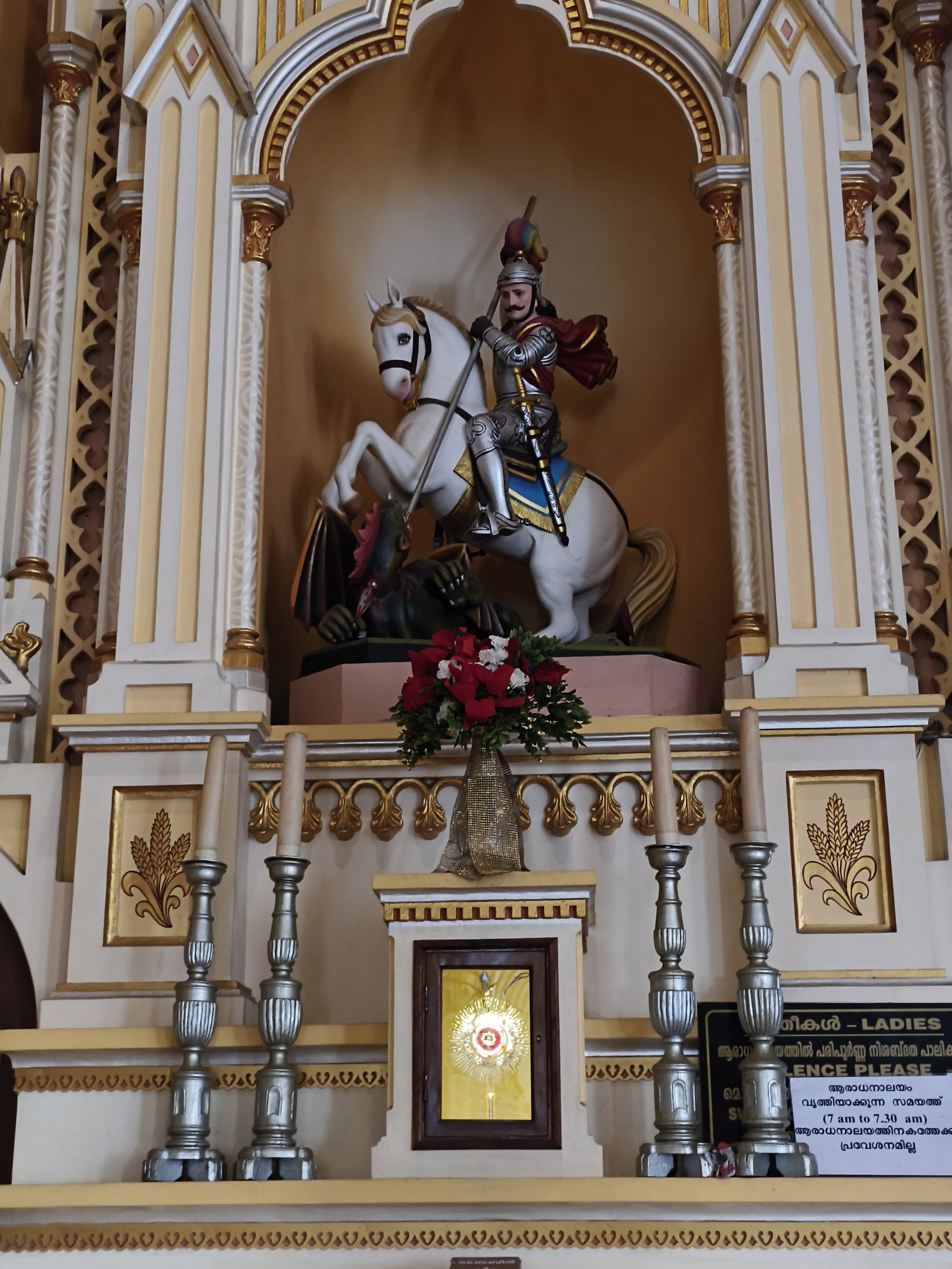
Statue of Saint George and the accompanying reliquary.

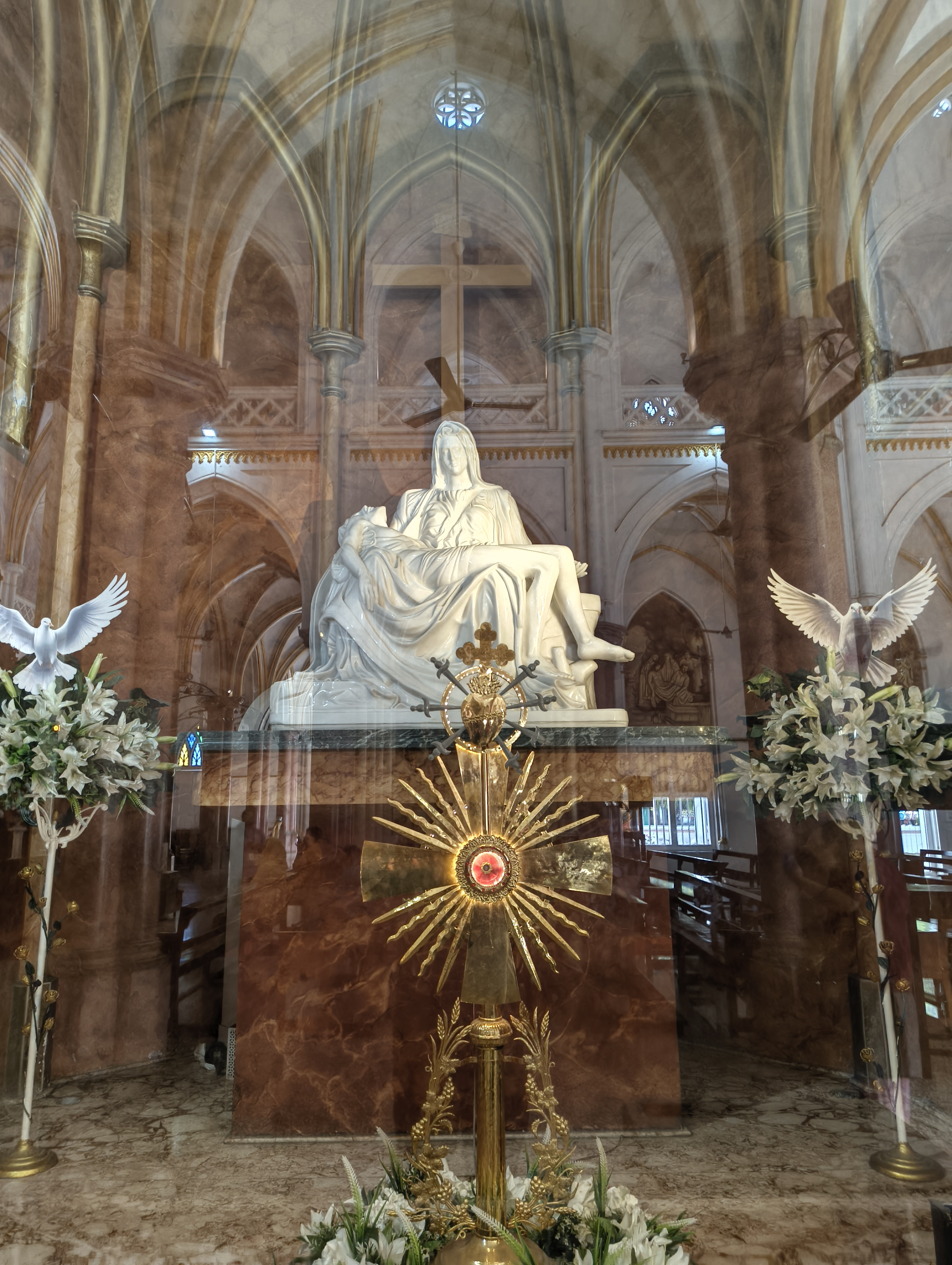
Relics of Virgin Mary.

== Mass timings ==
Ordinary days : 6.00 am, 7.30 am, 5.30 pm

Friday : 6.00 am, 7.30 am, 10.00 am, 5.30 pm, 7.30 pm

Sunday : 6.00 am, 7.30 am, 9.30 am, 5.30 pm, 7.30 pm
