= Tony Neelankavil =

Syro-Malabar bishop

Mar Bishop Mar Tony Neelankavil
- Auxiliary Bishop of the Archeparchy of Trichur
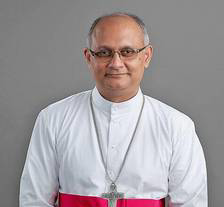
- Province: Ecclesiastical province of Thrissur
- Diocese: Syro-Malabar Catholic Archeparchy of Thrissur
- See: Massuccaba (titular)
- Installed: 18 November 2017
- Predecessor: Mar Raphael Thattil

Orders
- Ordination: 27 December 1993
- Consecration: 18 November 2017
- Rank: Auxiliary Bishop

Personal details
- Born: Antony; 23 July 1967 (age 58) Valapad, Kerala, India
- Denomination: Syro-Malabar Catholic Church
- Residence: Catholic Archbishop’s House, Thrissur
- Parents: N. A. Ouseph; T.J Mary

Mar Tony Neelankavil (born 23 July 1967) is a Syro-Malabar Catholic bishop and titular bishop of Masuccaba. He is the third and the present Auxiliary Bishop of Syro-Malabar Catholic Archdiocese of Thrissur, India from 18 November 2017. He was nominated as the Auxiliary Bishop on 1 September 2017 and was ordained to the office on 18 November 2017 by Archbishop Mar Andrews Thazhath assisted by Mar Jacob Thoomkuzhy and Mar Raphael Thattil.

== Early life ==
Neelankavil was born on 23 July 1967, at Valapad, Trichur, as the eldest son among the five children of Chevalier Prof. N.A Ouseph and T.J Mary in the Archeparchy of Trichur. He belongs to Our Lady of Lourdes Metropolitan Cathedral Trichur. Neelankavil had his school education at St. Raphael's Lower Primary School, Ollur and St. Joseph's Latin Convent L.P. School, Trichur, Don Bosco High School, Mannuthy and Model High School for Boys, Trichur. After having completed his Pre-Degree Course at St. Thomas College, Thrissur, he joined St. Mary's Minor Seminary, Trichur in 1984.

== Career ==
Neelankavil had his Philosophy and Theology bachelor degrees from St. Thomas Apostolic Seminary, Vadavathoor (1986-1993). He was ordained priest on 27 December 1993. He served as assistant parish priest at St. Antony's Forane Church Ollur (1994–95) and St. Thomas Syro-Malabar Church, Palayoor (1995). Then he was sent for higher studies in Leuven, Belgium, Catholic University, KU Leuven where he took licentiate in 1997 and Doctorate in Theology in 2002. He joined as professor at Marymatha Major Seminary in 2002 and served the Marymatha Major Seminary Trichur as Animator, Dean of Studies, Lecturer of Systematic Theology, Spiritual Father, Director of Marymatha Publications and Rector of the Marymatha Major Seminary. He launched the International Symposium Series called MEPC (Marymatha Encounters of Pastoral Challenges). He served the Archeparchy of Trichur as a member of the Theological Commission, chaplain of different formation centers and convents, and a member of Presbyteral Council and College of Consulters. He also served as chaplain of Jesus Fraternity (Prison ministry) at Special Sub-Jail, Trichur.

== Theologian and Bishop ==
He founded Pastoral Animation, Research, Outreach and Community-building - PAROC Research Institute, Trichur a new venture to visualize the pastoral ministry in the present context and to train pastoral leaders from the clergy, the religious and the laity. Neelankavil is a well-known orator, writer and theologian. He has presented papers in several theological conferences, both national and international. He has published several scientific articles in national and international journals and has edited three scholarly books. He has received Junior Scholar Fellowship from the Catholic University KU Leuven, Belgium twice and has received the famous Gambrinus Fellowship from the Technische Universiteit, Dortmund, Germany. He was also member of the Theology Forum of the Syro-Malabar Church and the priest-member of the Board of Directors of the Liturgical Research Centre before he became bishop. He was also a member of CBCI Bishops-Theologians Colloquium. As bishop, he was the Chairman of the Doctrinal Commission of the Syro-Malabar Church (2019-2024), Episcopal member of the Synodal Commission for Mangalapuzha Seminary (2019-2024), the Chairman of the Doctrinal Commission of the Kerala Catholic Bishops' Conference KCBC (2019-2025), the Episcopal member of the Health Commission of the KCBC. Presently, he is the Chairman of the Liturgical Research Centre of the Syro-Malabar Synod, the Chairman of the Synodal Commission for St. Joseph's Pontifical Seminary, Mangalapuzha, Aluva and the Chairman of Synodal Commission for the Clergy. He is proficient in Malayalam, English, and German. He has participated in the Third International Conference on Catechesis from 8 to 10 September 2022, organized by the Pontifical Council for Promoting New Evangelization in Paul VI Hall, Vatican.
