= Eparchy of Irinjalakuda =

Eastern Catholic eparchy in Kerala, India

Syro-Malabar Catholic Eparchy of Irinjalakuda
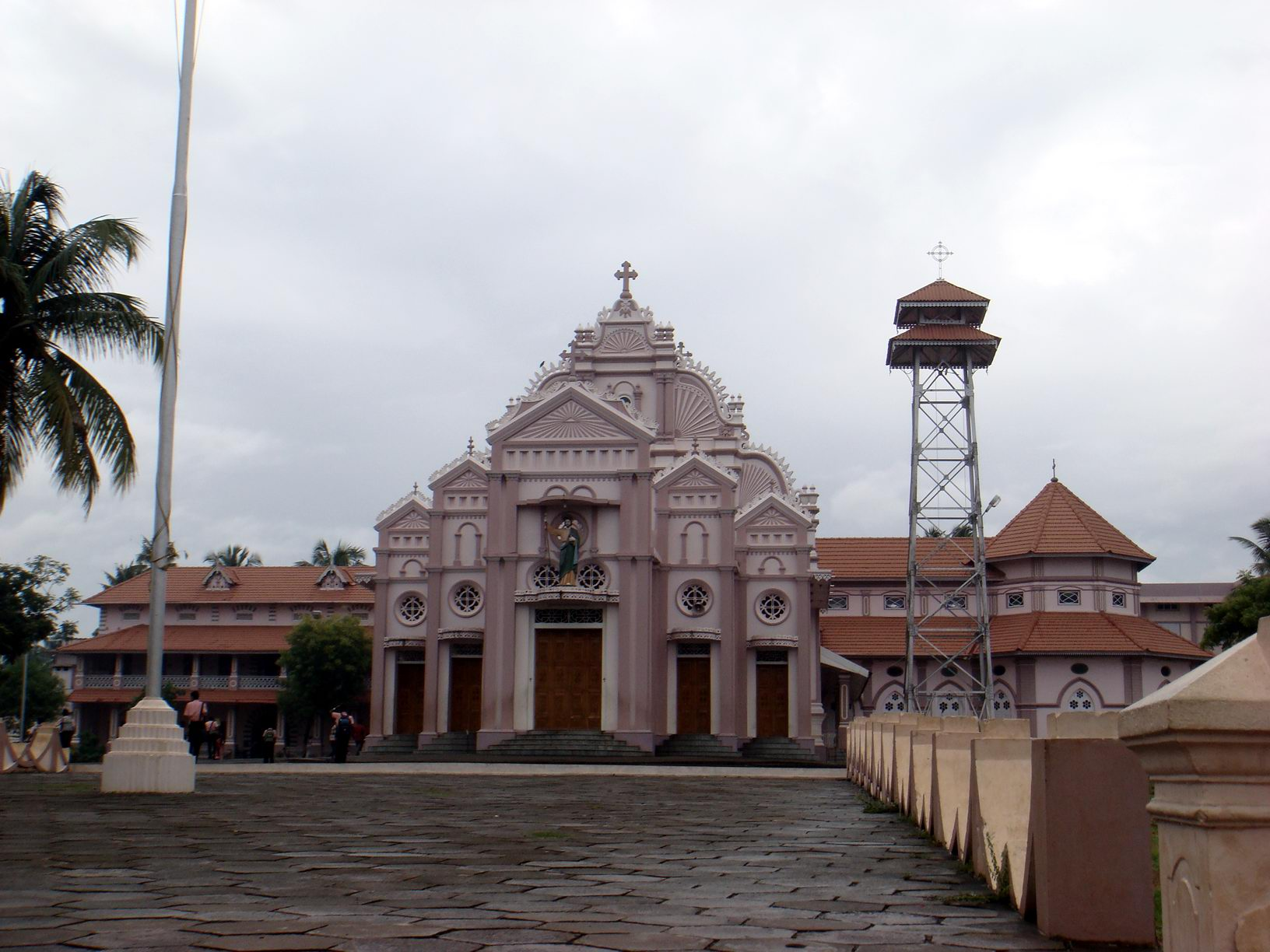

- Coat of arms

Location
- Country: India
- Territory: Thrissur district
- Ecclesiastical province: Thrissur

Statistics
- Population: 260000
- Parishes: 136
- Churches: 152

Information
- Denomination: Catholic Church
- Sui iuris church: Syro-Malabar Church
- Rite: East Syriac Rite
- Established: 1978
- Cathedral: St Thomas Cathedral & Bishop House

Current leadership
- Pope: Leo XIV
- Major Archbishop: Raphael Thattil
- Bishop: Pauly Kannookadan, Bishop of Irinjalakuda
- Metropolitan Archbishop: Andrews Thazhath

Website
- irinjalakudadiocese.com

The Eparchy of Irinjalakuda is a suffragan eparchy (Eastern Catholic diocese) in the ecclesiastical province of the metropolitan Syro-Malabar Catholic Archeparchy of Thrissur in Kerala state's Thrissur District, southern India.It is part of the Syro-Malabar Church.

Its cathedral episcopal see is Saint Thomas Cathedral, in Irinjalakuda city. Bishop Pauly Kannookkadan is the head of the diocese now The former cathedral (of Arch diocese of Crangannore).

== Statistics ==
As per 2015, it pastorally served 269,867 Catholics (20.4% of 1,326,000 total) on 1,180 km^{2} in 134 parishes and 20 missions with 301 priests (209 diocesan, 92 religious), 2,085 lay religious (168 brothers, 1,917 sisters) and 53 seminarians.

== History ==
The eparchy was created as Diocese of Irinjalakuda / Irinialakuden(sis) (Latin adjective) by Pope Paul VI in his bull Trichurensis Eparchiae of 22 June 1978, on territory split off from the then Eparchy (Diocese) of Trichur (now its Metropolitan). Now, diocese of Irinjalakuda is under this Thrissur Archdiocese.

=== Antecedents ===
St Thomas, one of the apostles of Christ, after receiving the Holy Spirit at Pentecost, set about the mission of spreading the gospel of Jesus Christ to the whole world. A review of the life of St Thomas will prove how he fulfilled this great mission in India. According to the tradition, St Thomas came by sea and landed at Kodungalloor (Cranganore) the capital of the then Chera Empire in 52 AD. He baptised families in Kodungalloor and Palayur (Trichur). St Thomas preached the gospel wherever he went, and founded churches. According to Malabar tradition St Thomas founded seven churches, they are in Cranganore, Quilon, Chayal, Kokkamangalam, Niranam, Paravur and Palayur. From there he went to Coromandel and suffered martyrdom near the Little Mount in Tamil Nadu. His body was brought to the town of Mylapore and was buried in a holy shrine. According to "Ramban Songs", St Thomas converted 17,550 people. He ordained priests and consecrated bishops. The Apostle consecrated Kepa, a native, as Bishop of Kodungalloor and as the head of St Thomas Christians and Paul as the Bishop of Mylapore. It is worth mentioning that the Apostle gave his followers a way of worship suited to their clime, culture and customs. Since the 4th century, the Church in India started communication with the East Syriac Church and soon began to introduce liturgical books and share rites. Thus the Indian Church became a member of the Babylonian (also known as Assyrian & Syro-Chaldean) Patriarchate for practical purpose, not for doctrinal reasons.

The head of the Indian Church was called The Metropolitan and Gate of All India, and had jurisdiction over all of the country. When the Chaldean prelates came to India as the spiritual heads of the independent metropolitan provinces under the East Syriac Patriarch, the administration of the Indian Church was done by a native priest with the title Archdeacon of all India or Jathikkukarthavian. The residence of the Metropolitan was first at Kodungallur, then Angamaly etc. Because of the close association of the St Thomas Christians with the East Syriac Church, the Indian Church of St Thomas is classified in history under the Chaldean matrix of rites, as we read in CCEO C.28:2 As Pope Pius XII said "during the centuries that India was cut off from the west and despite many trying vicissitudes, the Christian communities formed by the Apostle conserved intact the legacy he left them, and as soon as the sea passage at the close of the 15th century offered a link with their fellow Christians of the west, the union with them was spontaneous" (AAS, XLV (1953) pp. 96 97). Thus the Syro-Malabar Church, as Pope John Paul II said, "Never severed from the communion with the Church of Rome, in a continuity that the enormous geographic distance has never been able to break". ("Insegnamenti Giovanni Paulo II". III/2. Rome, 1980, p. 513). In the 15th and 16th centuries the Metropolitans of the St Thomas Christians, who were then of East Syriac Rite, took Angamaly as their residential see. (cf. Bulls of Pope Julius III dated 10 March 1553 and 4 May 1553 in Giamil, "Genuinae Relationes....." Rome 1902, PP. 17–18-24).

== Episcopal Ordinaries ==
(all Syro-Malabar Rite native Indians)

Suffragan Eparchs (Bishops) of Irinjalakuda

- Mar James Pazhayattil (1978.06.22 – retired 2010.01.18), died 2016
- Mar Pauly Kannookadan (2010.01.18 – ...).

== Saints and causes for canonisation ==
- Birthplace of St. Maria Theresa Chiramel
- Ven. Joseph Vithayathil
- Servant of God Fr. Canisius Thekkekara (Canisius of Saint Teresa), CMI
