= Masuccaba =

Roman Empire - Mauretania Caesariensis (125 AD)

Masuccaba an ancient Roman town in the Roman province of Mauretania Caesariensis (North Africa).

The ancient town was also the seat of a Christian bishopric called in Latin Dioecesis Masuccabensis. The only known ancient bishop of this town was Passinatus, who took part in the synod assembled in Carthage in 484 by the Arian King Huneric of the Vandal Kingdom, after which Passinato was exiled to Vandal-controlled Sicily.

Today Masuccaba survives as a titular bishopric of the Roman Catholic Church the location of Masuccaba is not exactly known, but it is presumed to be in today's Algeria. The current bishop is Tony Neelankavil, Auxiliary bishop of Syro-Malabar Catholic Archeparchy of Thrissur.
