= St. Thomas Forane Church, Mattom =

Church in Kerala, India

- Location within Kerala
- 10.66105°N 76.0865°E
- Location: Mattom, Thrissur district, Kerala
- Country: India
- Denomination: Syro-Malabar Catholic Church

History
- Founded: 140; 1886 years ago
- Dedication: Thomas the Apostle

Administration
- District: Thrissur
- Archdiocese: Thrissur

Clergy
- Archbishop: Andrews Thazhath
- Vicar: Francis Aloor

St. Thomas Forane Church is a Syro-Malabar Catholic church located in Mattom of Thalapilly Taluk in the Thrissur district of Kerala, south India. The church belongs to the Syro-Malabar Catholic Archdiocese of Thrissur. Founded in 140 A.D., it is one of the oldest churches in India.

Apart from the main church, there are ten other parishes under this forane, including centuries old ones.

== History ==
St. Thomas Forane Church in Mattom was established in AD 140.

== Feast ==
The main feast of the church is held in the month of January every year. In the feast, there is a ceremony of carrying an arrow in a procession.

== Parishes under the Forane ==
St. Sebastian Church, Aloor (established: 1960), St. Mariam Thressia Church, Aloor East (established: 2007), St. Sebastian's Church, Chittattukara (established: 1770), St. Thomas Church, Choondal (established: 1973), St. Antony Church, Elavally South (established: 1925), St. Joseph Church, Arikaniyoor, Kananassery (established: 1933), St. Xavier Church, Konnammuchi (established: 1924), St. Sebastian Church, Kunnamkulam (established: 1747), Nativity of Our Lady Church, Choondal (established: 1875), St. Sebastain Church, Vaka (established: 1976) are the other churches under the forane.
