= Mary Matha Major Seminary =

Coordinates: 10°31′49.9″N 76°17′20.7″E

- Motto: Pastores Dabo Vobis
- Type: Seminary
- Established: 1997; 29 years ago
- Affiliations: Catholic University of Leuven, Belgium
- Students: 202
- Location: Mulayam, Thrissur, India
- Website: www.marymathaseminary.com
- Data as of 12 November 2011

Mary Matha Major Seminary is a Christian seminary founded by Syro-Malabar Catholic Archdiocese of Thrissur in Mulayam, Thrissur, Kerala. It is affiliated to the Catholic University of Leuven, Belgium.

== Buildings ==
Main block

Academic and administration building, includes computer labs, seminary office auditorium, chapel, theology and philosophy class rooms, administrative staff and faculty offices, guest rooms, staff dining room, reception and parlour

Theology resident block

Philosophy resident block

Staff resident block and guest house block

Dining and kitchen block

Library block

== History ==
For years candidates to priesthood from Syro-Malabar Catholic Archdiocese of Thrissur are sent to Mangalapuzha Seminary, Aluva and St. Thomas Apostolic Seminary, Kottayam. But due to the accommodation and over crowding of students in seminaries, the Syro-Malabar Catholic Archdiocese of Thrissur decided to construct a new seminary for the upcoming priests. The foundation stone of the seminary was laid by First Metropolitan Archbishop of Thrissur, Joseph Kundukulam on 8 December 1997 in Mannuthy. Later on classes were started on 1 June 1998 by Metropolitan Archbishop of Thrissur, Jacob Thoomkuzhy. The seminary was formally inaugurated on 15 August 1998 by Mar Varkey Vithayathil, the then Apostolic administrator of the Syro-Malabar Church.

== Administration and courses ==
The seminary is run by the Archbishop of Thrissur as chairman and an executive council. The present rector of the seminary is Rev. Dr. Tony Neelankavil and vice-rector is Rev. Fr. Jaison Koonamplackal. In the academic year 2017–2018, there are 19 staff members and 170 students.
