= Vithayathil =

Family name in Kerala, India

Vithayathil is a family name in Kerala.

The family has a long history and the descendants can be found all over Kerala.

It is said that when Tipu Sultan, went on war (during the 18th century) with the then Kingdom Of Kochi, some of the ancestors migrated to the Kochi region and the others stayed back. Those who stayed back still live in the Kanjoor region.

Major Archbishop Cardinal Mar Varkey Vithayathil was the head of the Syro-Malabar Church, the second largest Eastern Rite or Oriental Catholic Church.

At present most of the descendants of this family are settled down in and around Varapuzha (kochi). Venerable Fr. Joseph Vithayathil (blessed Mariam Thresia's spiritual guide) also hails from the same family. In February 1972, Justice Vithayathil Commission was appointed to look into the communal violence in Kerala's Thalassery.
