= Antony Thachuparambil =

Indian Christian priest (1894-1963)

Servant of God Antony Thachuparambil
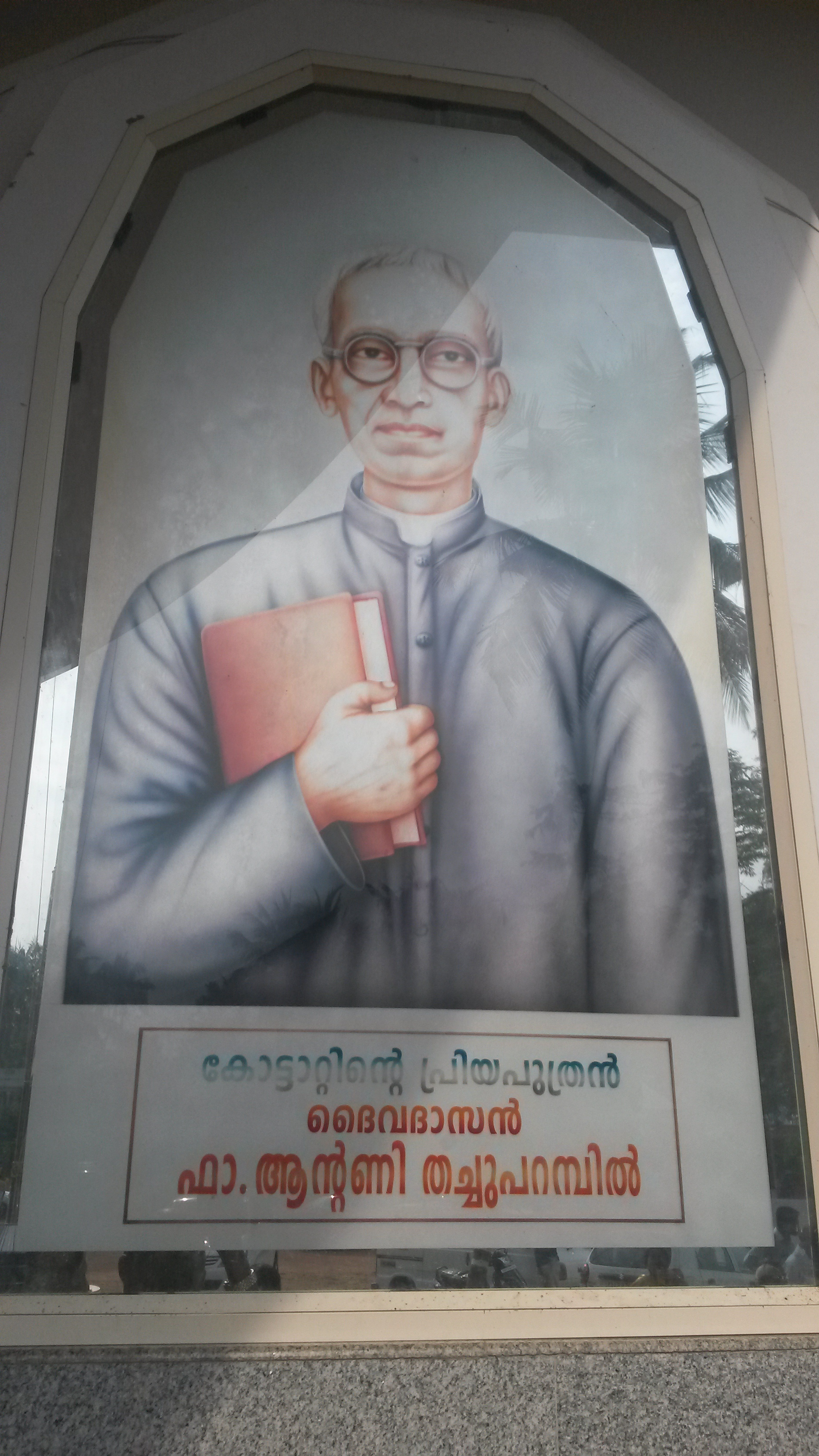
- Mural of Antony Thachuparambil at Kottat Church, Chalakudy, Kerala
- Church: Syro-Malabar Catholic Church

Personal details
- Born: 8 December 1894 Kottat, Thrissur District, Kerala, India
- Died: 9 June 1963 (aged 68) Chelakkara, Thrissur district
- Occupation: Catholic priest

Antony Thachuparambil (8 December 1894 – 9 June 1963), popularly known as "the Missionary of Chelakkara" was an Indian Syro-Malabar Catholic priest and social reformer who worked in Chelakkara, Thrissur District, Kerala, India. A candidate for sainthood, he was declared a Servant of God by the Holy See in 2009.

== Early years ==
Antony Thachuparambil was born on 8 December 1894 in Kottat, a suburban village of Chalakudy in Kerala to Poulose and Rosa. He had his early schooling in Chalakudy Government High School and college education in St. Joseph's College, Tiruchirappalli. He continued his pastoral education at Mary Matha Major Seminary, Thrissur and was ordained on 22 Dec 1924.

== Social career ==
Thachuparambil started his career in 1928 as the first Chaplain of Chelakkara, a backward forest area in Thrissur. There, he worked among the poor and he built St. Mary's Forane Church, a school for girls (Little Flower Girls High School), a destitute home for children which was later renamed Fr. Antony Balabhavan, a convent for nuns, Little Flower Convent and a health clinic which later grew to become Jeevodaya Mission Hospital.

== Beatification process ==
Thachuparambil is said to be credited with several miracles which are being considered and verified by Roman Catholic Church. His contributions for the overall development of Chelakkara, reportedly irrespective of the caste, creed or colour, were considered by the Roman Catholic Church when deciding upon initiation of his beatification process. Paul Pulikkan was appointed postulator and Antony Thachuparambil was declared a Servant of God by the Roman Catholic Church on 9 December 2009. In December 2020, the diocese court completed the formalities and prepared an 8090-page document detailing the priest's life and works, to be submitted to the Holy See.

== In the media ==
Shalom Television aired a documentary on the life of Thachuparambil as an episode under their series, Saints Town in 2015.

== See also ==
- George Vakayil
- Mathew Kavukattu
