= St. Thomas Cathedral, Irinjalakuda =

Cathedral in Kerala, India

St. Thomas Cathedral
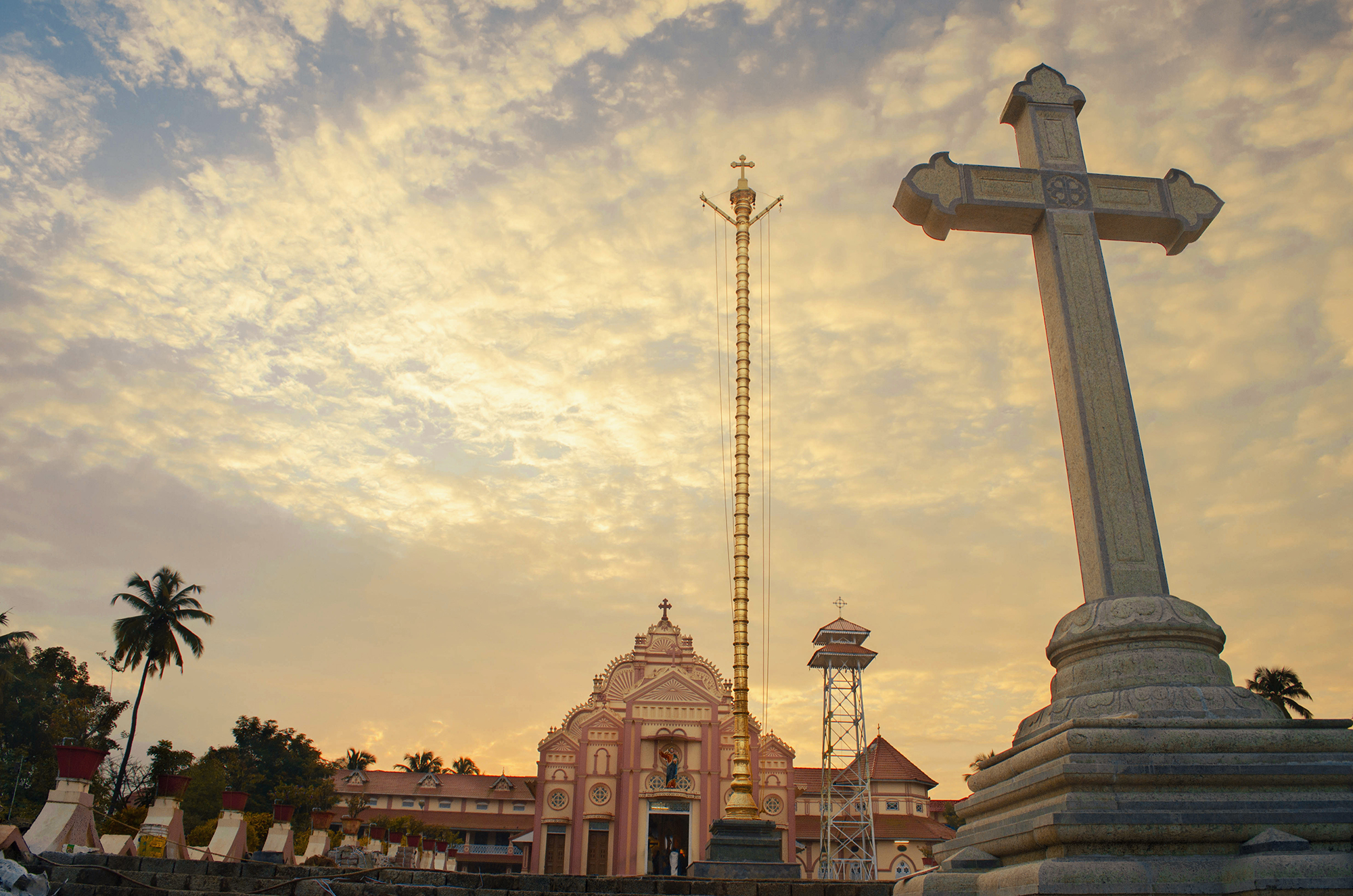
- St. Thomas Cathedral
- Location: Irinjalakuda, Kerala
- Country: India
- Denomination: Catholic Church (Syro-Malabar)

History
- Founded: 1845 A.D.

Administration
- Division: Kerala

St. Thomas Cathedral is the Syro Malabar Catholic cathedral of the eparchy of Irinjalakuda in India. It presently exists under the nomenclature and the Canonical Status as Cathedral in the Wake of the Origin of the New Eparchy, effected by the amalgamation of the two independent and important parishes of the locality, namely, St. George’s Forane Church and St. Mary’s church, which were amicably situated side by side for about a century.

The Cathedral Parish is the largest Syro Malabar Catholic Parish in India and Asia, presently numbering a Syro Malabar Catholic population of 14,000 people, belonging to 3,600 families. Apart from the Eparchial office and related institutions, numerous religious institutes, formation houses, as well as catechetical, educational and service centers took their origin with the benign and generous support of the Catholic Community of the area. The major religious institution to be mentioned is the Udaya Provincial House belonging to the Congregation of the Mother of Carmel. The Cathedral Parish also has its own multifarious institutes and associations.

== History ==
Each had its several institutions and properties as well as high resources. St. George Church is chronologically prior as it was established in 1845 AD. This originated at the request of the Christian merchants who migrated to Irinjalakuda during the regime of Rama Varma Thampuran (known as " Sakthan Thampuran" – 1790-1805) the king of Kochi. He invited the Christian merchants from the neighboring ancient Catholic Syrian regions such as Velayanad, Pazhuvil, Pudukkad, Kallettumkara(Thazhekkad), Mapranam, Kalparambu, etc. because of trade and industry. Thus a small Church was constructed here, then known as Kombarakunnu under the guidance of the Parish Priest of Mapranam Church with the interest of the propaganda. Later they tried for building a spacious Church.To permission they approached General Cullen, Resident of Travancore and Cochin. He selected the present Chanthakunnu area of Manavalasseri muri instead of Mangadikunnu and Kombarakunnu and built a church there. However, in July 1874 the so-called "Mellus Schism" affected the area and the majority succumbed to it. It is one of the parishes that have given the ship expenses of Mar Yohannan Elias Mellus, from Basra to Mumbai. But a ministry resisted and tried to continue with the papal allegiance. With that view, they constructed a new and better Church in 1880 dedicated to the Blessed Virgin Mary (ST. Mary’s Church). In 1882 Mar Eliya Yohannan Mellus returned to Mesopotamia. Gradually several religious, educational, and charitable institutions came up and flourished in the area. Though the Mellusian group got away from that influence and rejoined the Papal allegiance, both the Churches remained side by side as separate Catholic Parishes without territorial limits. They cherished Concord and Cordiality. In 1944 St. George Church was raised to the Status of a Forane Church.

But in the wake of the new eparchy with its title and headquarters in the municipal town of Irinjalakuda, the ecclesiastical authorities thought it better and convenient to amalgamate them as a Single Canonical parish to form the Cathedral of the new eparchy. Subsequently, in consultation with the parish priest, Trustees, and Representatives of both the parishes, Mar Joseph Kundukulam, then Bishop of Trichur could effectively amalgamate them to form a Cathedral Parish, newly dedicated to St. Thomas the Apostle in 1978. While St. George’s Forane Church was changed to St. Thomas Cathedral Church, St. Mary’s Church was temporarily used as Bishop’s Chapel (Mar James Pazhayattil) and subsequently named Spirituality Centre. Irinajalakuda is well known for its religious harmony, marketing, and commercial facilities.

St Thomas, one of the apostles of Christ, after receiving the Holy Spirit at Pentecost, set about the mission of spreading the gospel of Jesus Christ to the whole world. A review of the life of St Thomas will prove how he fulfilled this great mission in India.

According to tradition, St Thomas came by sea and landed at Kodungalloor (Cranganore) the capital of the then Chera Empire in the year 52 A.D. He baptized families in Kodungalloor and Palayur (Trichur). St Thomas preached the gospel wherever he went and founded churches.

According to Malabar tradition, St Thomas founded seven churches, which are in Cranganore, Quilon, Chayal, Kokkamangalam, Niranam, Paravur, and Palayur. From there he went to Coromandel and suffered martyrdom near the Little Mount in Tamil Nadu. His body was brought to the town of Mylapore and was buried in a holy shrine. According to "Ramban songs" St Thomas converted 17550 people. He ordained priests and consecrated Bishops. The Apostle consecrated Kepa, a native, as Bishop of Kodungalloor and as the head of St Thomas Christians and Paul as the Bishop of Mylapore. It is worth mentioning that the Apostle gave his followers a way of worship suited to their clime, culture, and customs. In the 4th century, the church in India started communication with the East Syriac Church and soon began to introduce liturgical books and share rites. Thus the Indian Church became a member of the East Syriac Patriarchate for practical purposes, not for doctrinal reasons.

The head of the Indian Church was called The Metropolitan and Gate of All India and had jurisdiction all over the country. When the East Syriac prelates came to India as the spiritual heads of the independent Metropolitan provinces under the East Syriac Patriarch, the administration of the Indian Church was done by a native priest with the title Archdeacon of all India or Jathikkukarthavian. The residence of the Metropolitan was first at Kodungallur, then Angamaly, etc. Because of the close association of the St Thomas Christians with the East Syriac Church, the Indian Church of St Thomas is classified in history under the East Syriac matrix of rites, as we read in CCEO C.28:2 As Pope Pius XII said "during the centuries that India was cut off from the west and despite many trying vicissitudes, the Christian communities formed by the Apostle conserved intact the legacy he left them, and as soon as the sea passage at the close of the 15th century offered a link with their fellow Christians of the west, the union with them was spontaneous (AAS, XLV (1953) PP. 96 97). Thus the Syro-Malabar Church, as Pope John Paul II said, "Never severed from the communion with the Church of Rome, in a continuity that the enormous geographic distance has never been able to break. ("Insegnamenti Giovanni Paulo II." III/2. Roma, 1980, P. 513). In the 15th and 16th centuries the metropolitans of the St Thomas Christians, who were then East Syrians, took Angamaly as their residential see. (cf. Bulls of Pope Julius III dated 10 March 1553 and 4 May 1553 in Giamil, "Genuinae Relationes....." Rome 1902, PP. 17–18-24).

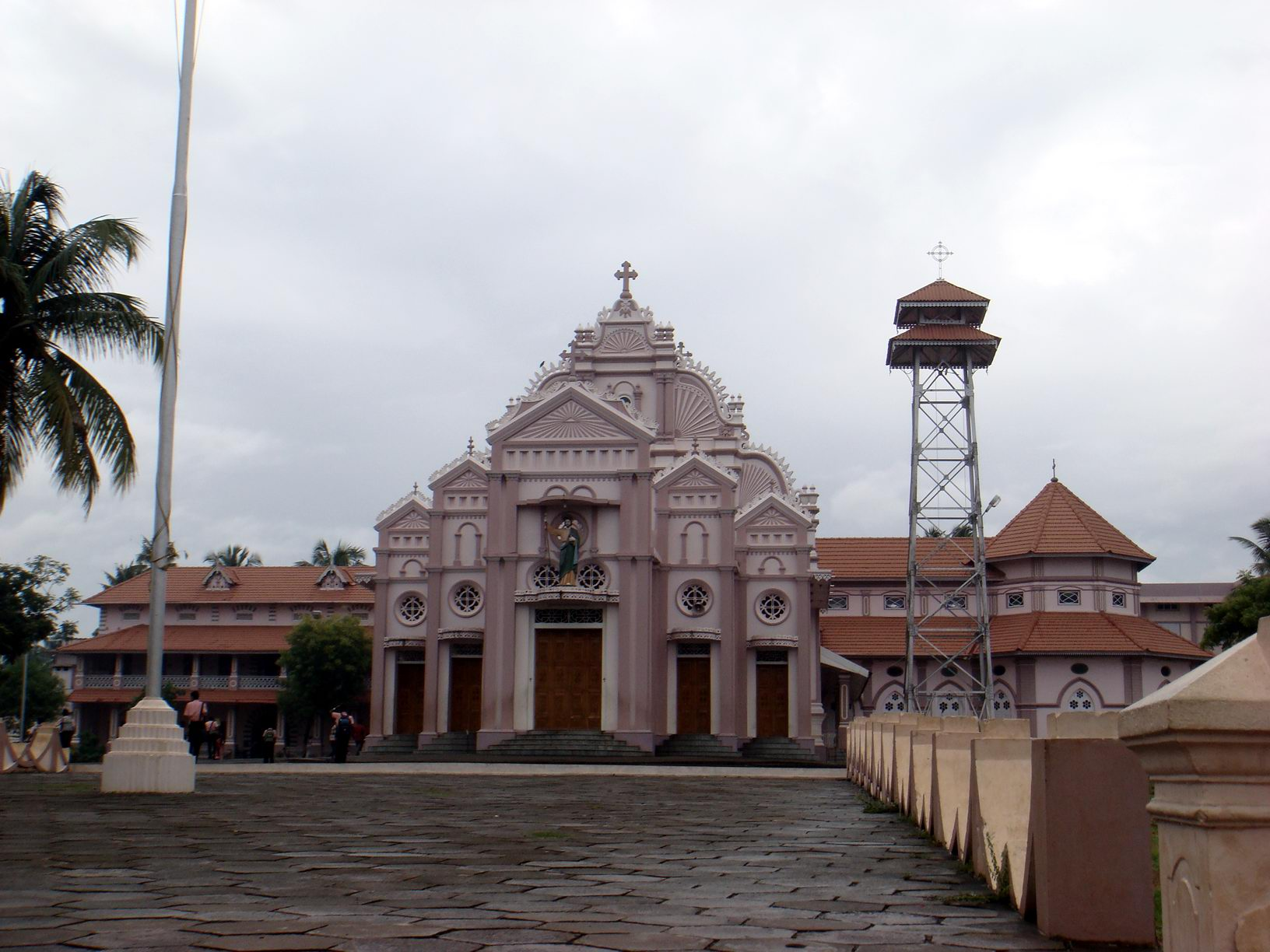
Another View

In the history of the St Thomas Christians, the arrival of the Portuguese missionaries to India during the 16th century was a turning point. The western missionaries helped the growth of the Indian Church, at the same time it also distorted the juridical and liturgical identity of the St Thomas Christians. After the Synod of Udayam-peroor (Diamper) in the year 1599, Mgr. Francis Roz, a Portuguese missionary, was appointed the first Latin Bishop for the Metropolitan See of St Thomas Christians. On 4 August 1600, the Portuguese Padroado jurisdiction was extended to Kodungalloor & Archdiocese of Angamaly was reduced as a suffragan to the Archdiocese Goa. The residential See of the bishop was transferred from Angamaly to Kodungalloor in 1607 in the light of the letter of permission of Pope Paul V, dated 20 August 1605. On 22 December 1608, the Metropolitan status of the See of Kodungalloor was restored by Pope Paul V. He ordered the geographical division of Cochin and Kodungalloor Angamaly (cf. Bull of Pope Paul V dated, 12 October 1609 "Bullarium Patronatus Portugalliae" Vol II, P. 14) as a compromise formula for settling a jurisdictional dispute between the Bishop of Cochin and Bishop Francis Roz of Kodungalloor - Angamaly. On 22 December 1610 Archbishop Menezes of Goa issued a decree restricting the jurisdictional rights of the Metropolitan of St Thomas Christians to certain areas in the present states of Kerala, Karnataka, Tamil Nadu, and Andhra Pradesh (cf. "Bullarium Romanum......" Vol. XI PP. 606–608)

The Policy of Latinisation by the missionaries caused dispute and resistance among the St Thomas Christians and it resulted in a revolt in the year 1653 called the "Coonan Cross Oath" and the ensuing fraction of Puthenkoottukar. To remedy this situation the Propaganda jurisdiction was also introduced on the St Thomas Christians. The St Thomas Christians were then divided among themselves under the two Latin Jurisdictions of Padroado and Propaganda. And the rebel bishops who headed the Puthenkoottukar in course of time separated themselves from the Catholic communion and became Jacobites. In the 18th century, the Metropolitan residence of Cranganore was transferred to the neighboring catholic center, Puthenchira. Metropolitan residence again changed to Aripalam (Pookkaatt) due to the opposition of local Naduvazhi.

In 1865 the jurisdiction of the East Syriac Patriarch over the Church of the St Thomas Christians was formally terminated by the Apostolic See. In 1886 the Metropolitan See of Cranganore was suppressed and the St Thomas Christians were put under Verapoly which was later raised to the status of an Archdiocese with the establishment of the Latin Hierarchy in India under the Propaganda Fide. The title of ‘Metropolitan of Cranganore’ was given ad honorem to the Bishop of Damao. When the See of Damao was annexed to that of Goa the Goan Archbishop began to carry the title of Cranganore also.

=== The Syro-Malabar Church ===
On 20 May 1887, Pope Leo XIII of illustrious memory by the bull Quod Jampridem reorganized the St Thomas Christians under two vicariates of Trichur, and Kottayam. On 28 July 1896 by the bull Quae rei sacrae, the same Pope reconstituted the two vicariates into three vicariates of Trichur, Ernakulam and Changanacherry and appointed natives as bishops. These Catholic St Thomas Christians were then called ‘The Syro-Malabar Church’. In 1911 the Vicariate Apostolic of Kottayam was erected for the Southists. By the epoch-making constitution Romani Pontifices of 21 December 1923, Pope Pius XI erected the Syro-Malabar Hierarchy and thus restored, to some extent, the hierarchical rule of the St Thomas Christians. But the form of Government was that of a Latin Metropolitan Province. Ernakulam was raised to the Metropolitan status and the eparchies of Trichur, Changanacherry, and Kottayam were made its suffragans. In 1955 the territory of jurisdiction was extended to some districts in Tamil Nadu and Karnataka. In 1956 Changanacherry also was raised to the Metropolitan status. By that time the number of eparchies had increased to seven.

The growth of the Syro-Malabar Church in the 20th century is widely admitted as marvelous. This energetic Church took up challenges in the Mission fields and thus from 1962 Syro-Malabar Exarchates began to be established outside Kerala. In 1977 the Exarchates were elevated to the status of Eparchies.

The Syro-Malabar Church, having 12 eparchies in Kerala under two Metropolitans - Ernakulam and Changanacherry - and 9 eparchies outside Kerala under Latin Provinces, was found in an anomalous situation when CCEO was promulgated in 1990. Taking into consideration the age-old traditions and the enormous growth of the Apostolic and Indian Church and to rectify the above anomaly, Pope John Paul II, by the constitution "Quae Maiori", dated 16 December 1992, raised the Syro-Malabar Church to the status of Major Archiepiscopal Sui iuris Church with the title of Ernakulam - Angamaly. The erection was published on 29 January 1993. The Metropolitan of Ernakulam, Mar Antony Cardinal Padiyara, was made the Major Archbishop. The proper territory of the Major Archbishop was determined to be the territory of the two provinces of Ernakulam and Changanacherry. The Installation of the Major Archbishop and the inauguration of the first Synod of Bishops of the Syro-Malabar Major Archiepiscopal Church were held at Ernakulam on 20 May 1993. In 1995 the Eparchies of Trichur and Tellicerry were elevated to Metropolitan status. A new eparchy of Thuckalay was erected in 1996 in the province of Changanacherry. Bifurcating Tellicherry, the eparchy of Belthangady was erected in 1999. Another Eparchy was erected in Chicago for the Syro-Malabar migrants in February 2001. It is considered to be a remarkable event and milestone in the history of the Syro-Malabar Church. Similarly, the new eparchy of Idukki was erected in January 2003. On 21 August 2007, a new Eparchy of Badravathi was erected, bifurcating the Diocese of Mananthavady. Two new Eparchies, Ramanatha-puram and Mandia erected in February 2010. At present, the Syro-Malabar Major Archiepiscopal Church is having 18 Eparchies inside its proper territory under 5 Metropolitan sees and 11 Eparchies outside the proper territory.

== Festival ==
Pindi Perunnal is the Christian festival celebrated in Irinjalakuda which is known for its famous Fire Works and the Procession attended by all communities of Irinjalakuda.
