= Eparchy of Ramanathapuram =

Eastern Catholic eparchy in Tamil Nadu, India

Coordinates: 12.9926881°N 77.6112872°E

Location
- Country: India
- Ecclesiastical province: Syro-Malabar Catholic Archeparchy of Thrissur
- Metropolitan: Syro-Malabar Catholic Archeparchy of Thrissur

Statistics
- Parishes: 128

Information
- Denomination: Syro-Malabar Catholic
- Rite: East Syriac Rite
- Established: 2010
- Cathedral: Holy Trinity Cathedral, Coimbatore
- Secular priests: 1632

Current leadership
- Pope: Leo XIV
- Major Archbishop: Mar Raphael Thattil
- Bishop: Mar Paul Alappatt
- Metropolitan Archbishop: Mar Andrews Thazhath

Map
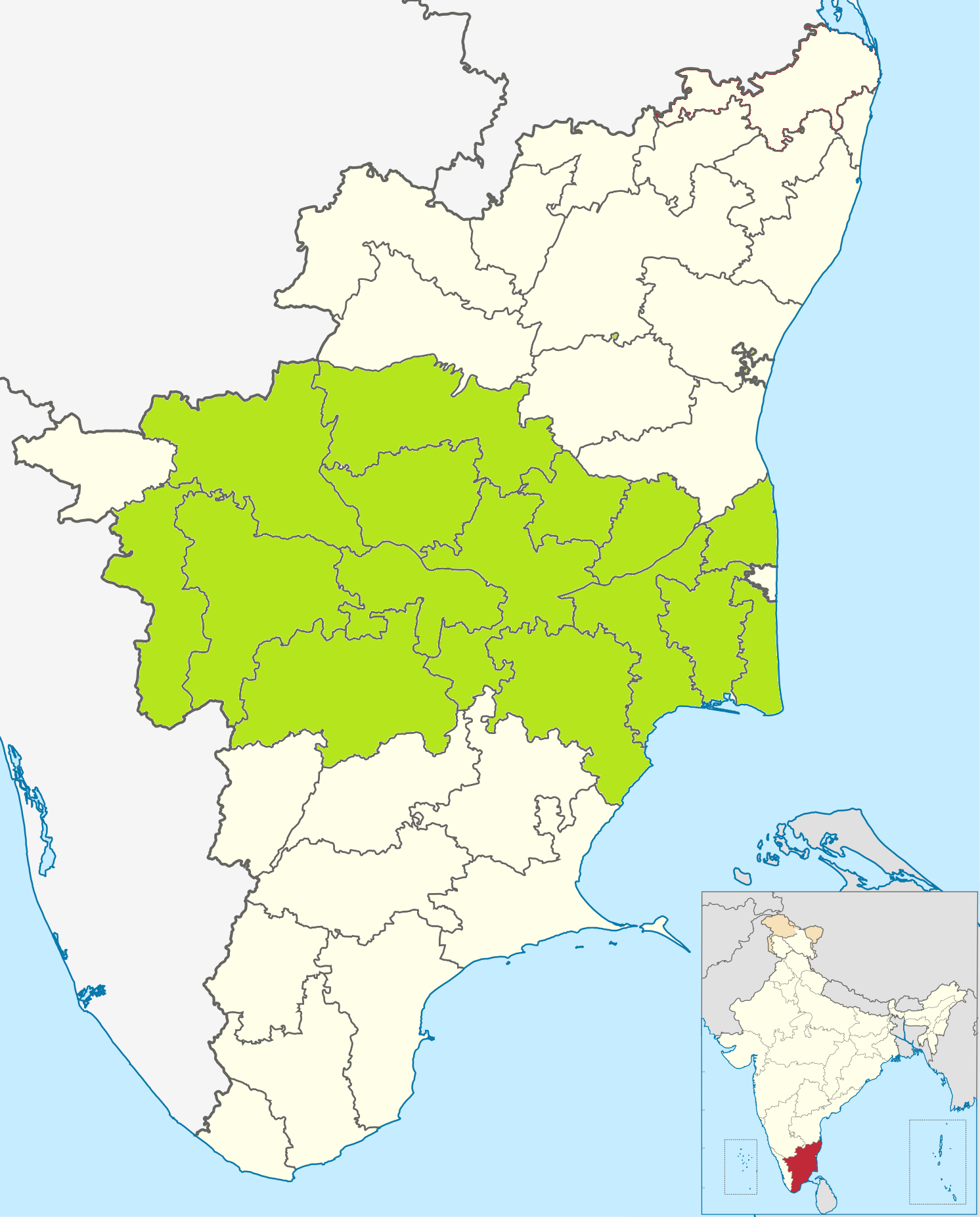

The Eparchy of Ramanathapuram is situated in Ramanathapuram locality in Coimbatore of Tamil Nadu. The eparchy includes Coimbatore, Tirupur, Erode, Karur, Salem, Tiruchirappalli, Thanjavur and Nagapattinam districts. Its territory is extended to Salem and Trichy on 10 October 2017. The eparchy of Ramanathapuram was created in 2010 by bifurcating the Syro-Malabar Catholic eparchy of Palghat. The present Bishop of Ramanathapuram is Mar Paul Alappat. Holy Trinity Church, Ramanathapuram is the cathedral of the eparchy and the bishop's residence is also at Ramanathapuram. The eparchy is a suffragan of the Syro-Malabar Catholic Archeparchy of Thrissur. The diocese was created by Mar Varkey Cardinal Vithayathil, by his decree on 18 January 2010. The eparchy has an area of 18,525 km^{2} with a total population of 89,24,717 of which around 15,694 are Syro-Malabar Catholics.
