= Edathiruthy =

- village
- Location in Thrissur, Kerala, India Edathiruthy (India)
- Coordinates: 10°22′0″N 76°8′0″E
- Country: India
- State: Kerala
- District: Thrissur

Government
  - Body: Panchayath

Population (2011)
  - Total: 12,921

Languages
  - Official: Malayalam, Hindi, English
- Time zone: UTC+5:30 (IST)
- PIN: 680 703
- Vehicle registration: KL- 47

Edathiruthy is a village in Thrissur district in the Indian state of Kerala.

== Geography ==
Edathiruthy is a village in Mathilakam Block. It belongs to Central Kerala Division. It is located 21 km South of District headquarters Thrissur, 10 km from Mathilakam. It is 266 km from the state capital Thiruvananthapuram.

Valappad (4 km), Thanniyam (4 km), Kaipamangalam (5 km), Karalam (7 km), Chazhoor (7 km) are the nearest villages. Edathiruthy is surrounded by Thalikkulam Block towards North, Irinjalakkuda Block towards East, Mathilakam Block towards South, Vellangallur Block towards South. Guruvayoor, Irinjalakuda, Thrissur and Kodungallur are nearby cities.

Edathiruthy west end on Arabian sea and east end on Kanolikanal

== Culture ==
The place derived its name from the Ayyappa temple where it is believed that the deity Vigraha is laid by Bhargava Parashurama, One of the avatars of Lord Mahavishu in Hindu Puranas.

The main idol (Vigraha) is placed in the left side of the upa devata Lord Shiva, thus deriving the name Edathiruthy.

The Panjayath is mostly governed by CPI-M, a left party. The Panjayath is popularly known as a communist panjayath where the first martyr of the Republic of India, Sardar Gopalakrishnan was born.+

Edathiruthy include all kind of religion (Hindu, Christian & Muslim) and all are living together. The cultures that belongs to each reglion and celebrating different festival in Edathiruty like Edathithry Ambu Thirunal festival (Every 23 & 24 January), Uttuthiruvnal, Ayyappa temple festival & annayottam (elephant running) etc.

== Demographics ==
At 2011 Indian census, Edathiruthy had a population of 12,921 with 5,782 males and 7,139 females.
