= Bible Tower =

Church tower in Thrissur, India

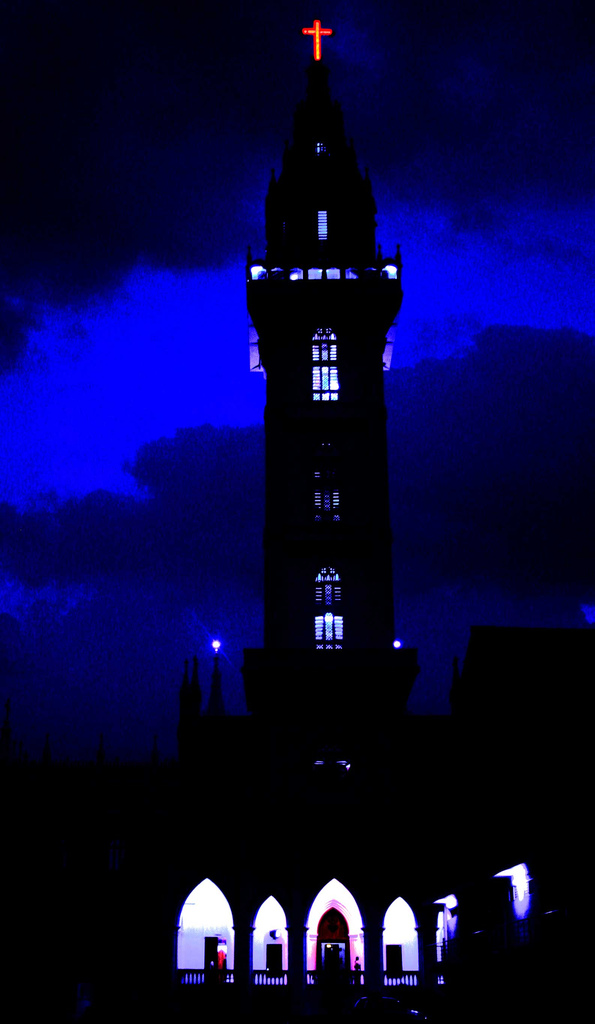
Bible tower at night.

The Bible Tower is situated in Thrissur city of Kerala, India. It was inaugurated on 7 January 2007. The tower is the tallest church tower in India and Asia. It was the tallest structure in whole of Kerala. The 79 metre (260 ft) tower stands behind two towers of 42.5 metres (140 ft) height.

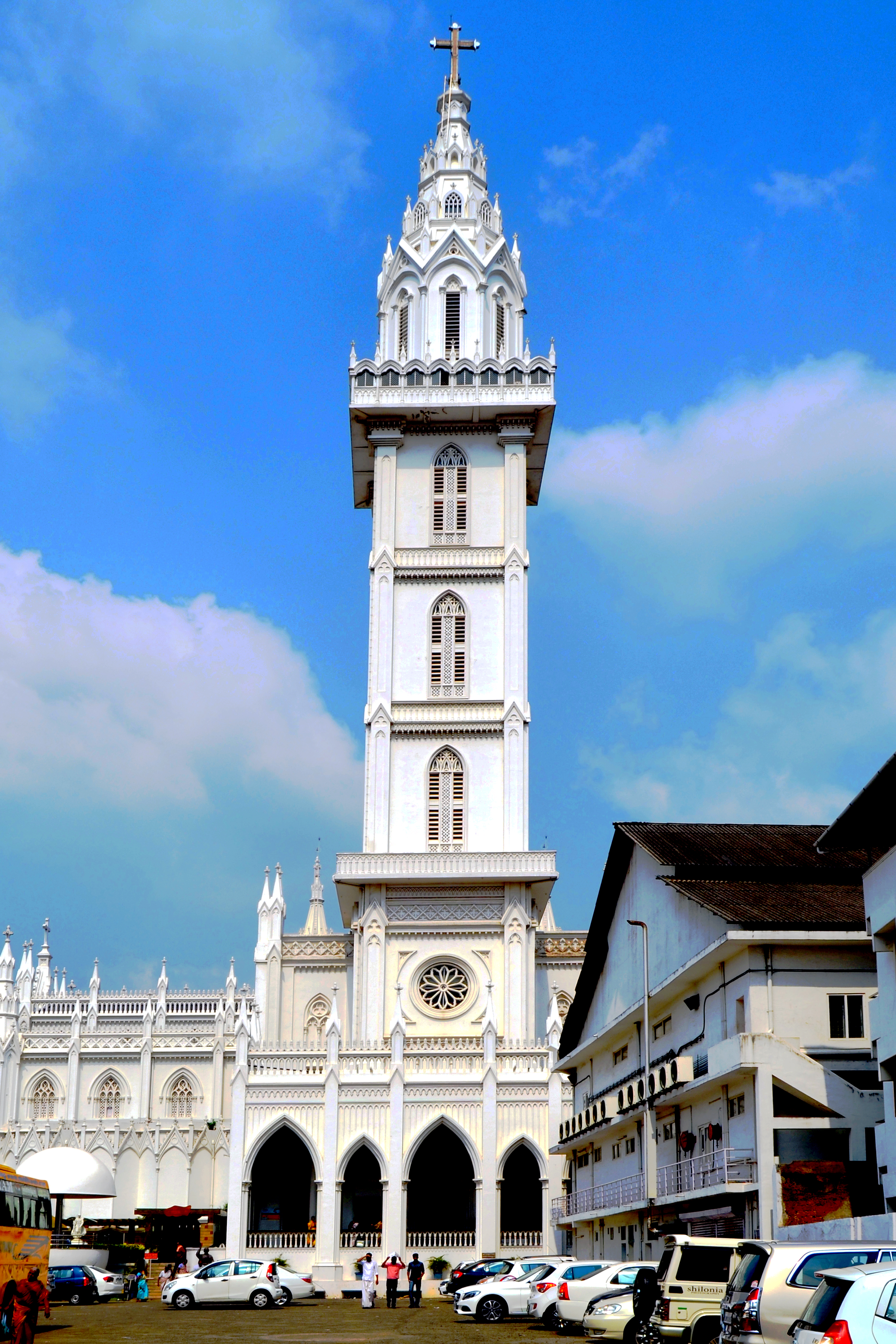
BIBLE TOWER
