= Joseph Vithayathil =

Indian Catholic priest

Venerable Joseph Vithayathil
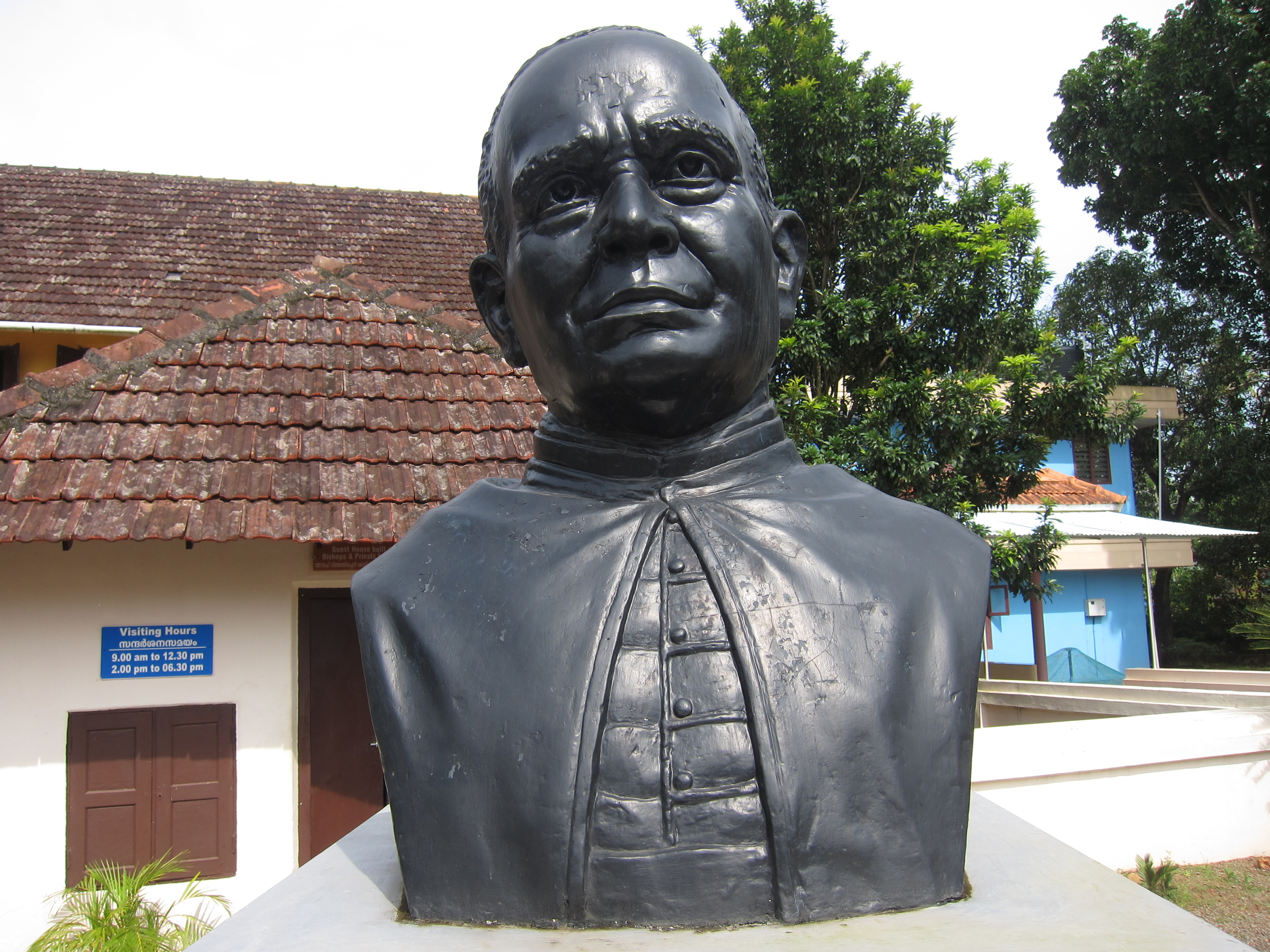

Religious; Pithavu
- Born: 23 July 1865; Puthenpally, Ernakulam, Kerala, India
- Died: 8 June 1964 (aged 98); Kuzhikattussery, (Aloor, Mala, Kerala)Thrissur District, India
- Venerated in: Syro-Malabar Catholic Church
- Feast: 8 June
- Attributes: Religious habit
- Patronage: Congregation of the Holy Family

Joseph Vithayathil was a priest from India who has been declared as Venerable by the Catholic Church. He was born in Puthenpally, Varapuzha, Ernakulam District of Kerala State of India to Catholic parents of the Vithayathil family on 23 July 1865. He had two brothers and two sisters.

At the suggestion of his parish priest Fr. Zecharias, he started priestly studies and joined the seminary on 30 May 1881. He was ordained as Priest on 11 March 1894 by Bishop Mar Adolph Medlycott of Thrissur Diocese at the St. Antony's Church, Ollur with 11 others.

== Priestly life ==
After being diocesan priest for a few years, in 1902 he was sent to perform exorcisms on a young mystic girl called Mariam Thresia. Here he became her Spiritual director until her death in 1926. He asked her to write her life story from early childhood, on the instructions of his Bishop. This resulted in the Autobiographical Notes of SaintMariam Thresia dealing with her life experiences and events up to 1905.

He helped her establish the Congregation of the Holy Family on 14 May 1914 blessed by Mar John Menachery. He was appointed as the Chaplain of this convent in 1922. After the death of the Mariam Thresia, he guided the congregation until the formation of its General Council in 1942. Under his guidance a school for teaching stitching, tailoring, weaving, knitting etc. was started in 1929 at Kuzhikkattussery.

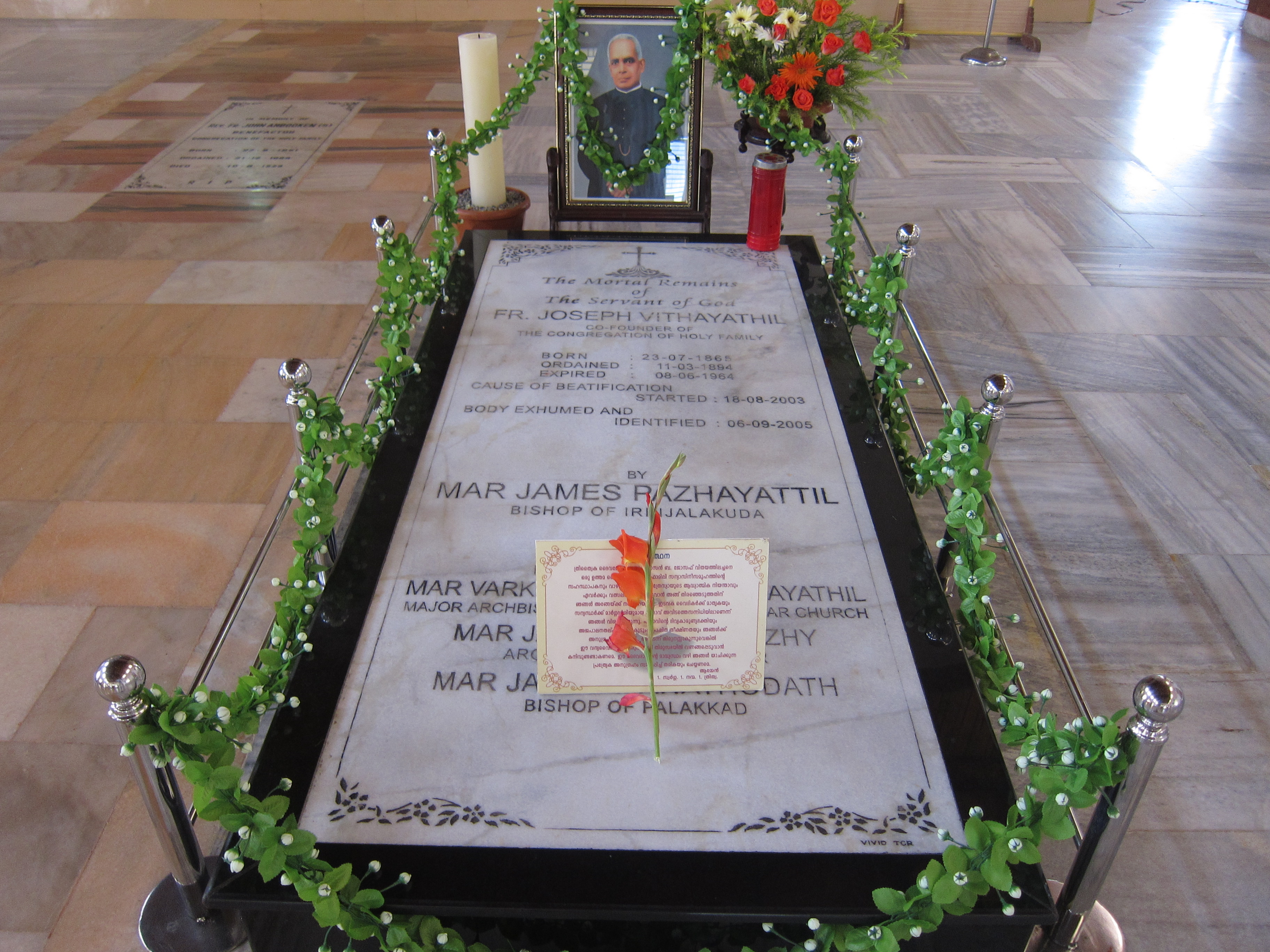
Tomb of Joseph Vithayathil

== Death and Veneration ==
He died on 8 June 1964 (same date on which Mariam Thresia died) and was buried at Kuzhikkattussery near the tomb of Mariam Thresia. He was declared as Servant of God on 18 May 2004 by Pope John Paul II. Mar Paul Alapatt, the current bishop of Ramanathapuram Diocese, was the Promotor of Justice for the Cause of the Servant of God Fr. Joseph Vithayathil. He was elevated to Venerable on 14 December 2015 by Pope Francis along with 16 others.

== Media ==
- Dhanyan Joseph Vithayathil is a teleserial on his life, broadcast on Shalom (TV channel).
- A book titled Karmayogi: Life History of S.D. Fr. Joseph Vithayathil edited by Lucy Arikkatt has been published Holy Family Publications in 2004.
- Joseph Vithayathil has written a book titled Biography of Rev.Mother Mariam Thresia.
