= James Pazhayattil =

- Eparch of Irinjalakuda
- Church: Syro-Malabar Church
- Diocese: Eparchy of Irinjalakuda
- In office: 22 June 1978 – 15 January 2010
- Predecessor: Eparchy erected
- Successor: Pauly Kannookadan

Orders
- Ordination: 3 October 1961 by Valerian Gracias
- Consecration: 10 September 1978 by Joseph Parecattil

Personal details
- Born: 26 July 1934 Puthenchira, Kingdom of Cochin, British Raj, British Empire
- Died: 10 July 2016 (aged 81)

James Pazhayattil (26 July 1934 – 10 July 2016) was the Syro-Malabar Catholic hierarch, Bishop of Irinjalakuda, India.

Ordained to the priesthood in 1961, Pazhayattil served as bishop of Irinjalakuda from 1978 to 2010.
