= Archeparchy of Trichur =

Eastern Catholic archeparchy in Kerala, India

Archeparchy of Trichur Archiparchia Trichuriensis

Catholic
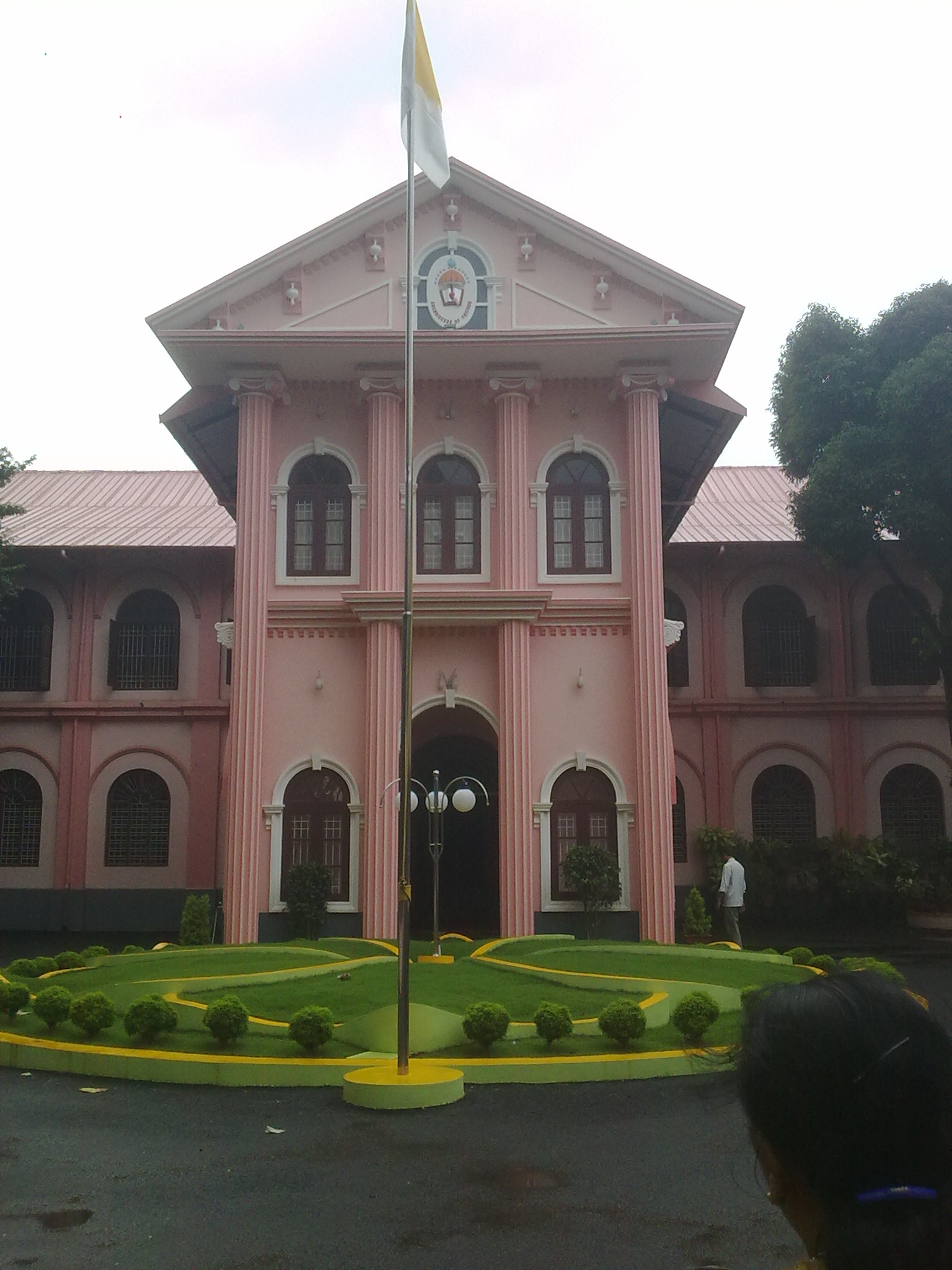

- Coat of arms

Location
- Country: India
- Territory: Thrissur district
- Metropolitan: Thrissur

Statistics
- Population: Total; Catholics: 2,018,635; 470,056
- Parishes: 215
- Churches: 251
- Schools: 23
- Members: 460,848

Information
- Denomination: Catholic Church
- Sui iuris church: Syro-Malabar Church
- Rite: East Syriac rite
- Established: 20 May 1887 (139 years ago)
- Cathedral: Our Lady of Lourdes Metropolitan Cathedral,
- Co-cathedral: Basilica of Our Lady of Dolours
- Patron saint: Our Lady of the Immaculate Conception

Current leadership
- Parent church: St Thomas Major Archepiscopal Church, Palayur
- Pope: Leo XIV
- Major Archbishop: Raphael Thattil
- Metropolitan Archbishop: Andrews Thazhath
- Auxiliary Bishops: Tony Neelankavil
- Vicar General: Msgr. Jose Vallooran, Msgr. Jose Konikkara

Map

Website
- www.trichurarchdiocese.org

The Syro-Malabar Catholic Archeparchy of Trichur, in Thrissur District of Central Kerala, India, with nearly half a million Syro-Malabar Catholics now, used to be the largest Catholic diocese in India when it included the Syro-Malabar Catholic Diocese of Irinjalakuda until 1978 and Syro-Malabar Catholic Eparchy of Palghat until 1973. It was one of the two Vicariates created for Syriac Catholics while the latter being Archeparchy of Changanassery. Syro-Malabar Catholic Diocese of Irinjalakuda, also located in Thrissur District, has over a quarter million Syro-Malabar Catholics now. Syro-Malabar Catholic Diocese of Palghat in Central Kerala extends to some regions in the neighbouring state of Tamil Nadu. In 2010, the parts of Tamil Nadu under the Syro-Malabar Catholic Diocese of Palghat were separated to form another Syro-Malabar Catholic Diocese of Ramanathapuram.

The Archeparchy of Trichur was founded on 20 May 1887 by Pope Leo XIII by his papal bull Quod Jam Pridem now covers an area of 2000 Sq. km and has a Catholic population of about 460848. There are 16 Foranes under the Archeparchy of Trichur. The total number of parishes is 215. In addition, there are 36 stations in the archdiocese. Diocese of Ramanathapuram, Diocese of Irinjalakuda and Diocese of Palghat are the suffragan dioceses of the Archeparchy. Raphael Thattil is the Major Archbishop of the Syro-Malabar Catholic Church, Andrews Thazhath is the Metropolitan Archbishop, Tony Neelankavil is the Auxiliary Bishop of the Archdiocese and Jacob Thoomkuzhy is the Archbishop Emeritus.

== History ==
The diocese was founded on 20 May 1887 by Pope Leo XIII by his papal bull Quod iam pridem. The boundaries of diocese were from Periyar (river) in Aluva to Bharathappuzha. Later it was extended to Palakkad district and extended to Coimbatore District in Tamil Nadu and was the largest Catholic diocese in India.

== Role in education ==
Rev. Medlycott has given a description about the state of facilities for education in the vicariate on his arrival in 1887 and on his return in 1896 as below:

The Vicariate of Trichur had a Catholic Syrian population of 108,422 with eighty-three parish churches and twenty-two chapels-of-ease, served by 118 priests of the Syrian Rite, besides 23 Syrian Carmelite Tertiary monks, in two monasteries; there was also a convent of 24 native Tertiary nuns with a middle-class school of 33 girls. The bishop on taking charge found that there were practically no schools, except one provided for clerics; he took early steps to open as many elementary parish schools as possible; within nine years (1888-96) the vicariate was provided with no less than 231 elementary parish schools for both sexes, educating over 12,000 children, besides a high school (St. Thomas's College), with 95 students; there were also 56 boys in St. Aloysius's High School, under the Tertiary monks.... plans were prepared to house the above college in a handsome structure. This was the condition of things when the bishop went to Europe on sick leave.

== Parishes and population ==
The total number of parishes is 215. In addition, there are 36 stations in the archdiocese. The population of Syro-Malabar Catholics in Thrissur Archdiocese is about 4,60,848. There are 16 foranes under Thrissur Archdiocese. They are:

Serial No.	Forane	Parishes	Stations	Houses	Catholic Population
1	Lourdes Cathedral	17	1	11746	59539
2	Dolours' Basilica	16	0	10095	54777
3	Chelakara	11	1	1615	8080
4	Erumapetty	11	1	2452	12285
5	Kandassankadavu	13	6	6933	39781
6	Kottekad	8	2	4994	26134
7	Mattom	8	5	3761	18471
8	Ollur	14	5	13372	63211
9	Palayur	14	2	5873	29696
10	Parappur	10	5	3783	17685
11	Pattikad	12	0	2609	13735
12	Pazhuvil	12	4	4425	24892
13	Pudukad	18	4	11038	61064
14	Puthur	10	0	3232	16040
15	Velur	13	2	3775	18528
16	Wadakkanchery	13	1	5174	26872

== Ordinaries ==
Vicar Apostolic, Bishops and Archbishops

Sl.No	Ordinary	Designation	Year of appointment	Last year of service
1	Adolph Medlycott	Vicar Apostolic	1887	1896
2	John Menachery	Vicar Apostolic	1896	1919
3	Francis Vazhapilly	Bishop	1919	1944
4	George Alapatt	Bishop	1944	1970
5	Joseph Kundukulam	Archbishop	1970	1997
6	Jacob Thoomkuzhy	Archbishop	1997	2007
7	Andrews Thazhath	Archbishop	2007	present

Auxiliary Bishops

Sl.No	Ordinary	Designation	Year of appointment	Last year of service
1	Andrews Thazhath	Auxiliary Bishop	2004	2007
2	Raphael Thattil	Auxiliary Bishop	2010	2017
3	Tony Neelankavil	Auxiliary Bishop	2017	present

Prelates Hailing From the archdiocese

Sl.No	Ordinary	Designation	Year of appointment	Last year of service
1	Joseph Irimpen	Former Bishop - Palghat	1974	1994
2	James Pazhayattil	Former Bishop - Irinjalakuda	1978	2010
3	Paul Chittilapilly	Former Bishop - Thamarassery	1988	2010
4	Raphael Cheenath	Former Archbishop - Cuttack–Bhubaneswar	1974	2011
5	Clemens Thottungal C.M.I	Former Bishop - Sagar	1977	1987
6	Joseph Pastor	Former Bishop - Sagar	1987	2006
7	Antony Chirayath	Former Bishop - Sagar	2006	2018
8	Bosco Puthur	*Curial bishop - Syro malabar Church * Former bishop - Melbourne and New Zealand; *Former apostolic Administrator - Archdiocese of Ernakulam Angamaly	2010	2025
9	Paul Alappatt	Bishop - Ramanathapuram	2010	present
10	Raphael Thattil	Major Archbishop of the Syro-Malabar Church	2025	present
11	Joseph Thykkattil	Bishop – Gwalior	2019	present
12	Franco Mulakkal	Former Bishop – Jalandhar	2013	2023
13	Antony Prince Panengaden	Archbishop – Shamshabad	2025	present
14	Vincent Nellaiparambil	Bishop – Bijnor	2019	present
15	Thomas Anthony Vazhapilly	Former Bishop – Mysore	2003	2017

== Saints and causes for canonisation ==
- St. Euphrasia Eluvathingal
- St. Maria Theresa Chiramel
- Ven. Augustine John Ukken
- Ven. Joseph Vithayathil
- Servant of God Fr. Antony Thachuparambil
- Servant of God Sr. Maria Celine Kannanaikal, UMI
