= Jacob Thoomkuzhy =

Indian Syro-Malabar Catholic archbishop (1930–2025)

Mar Jacob Thoomkuzhy
- Archbishop Emeritus of Trichur
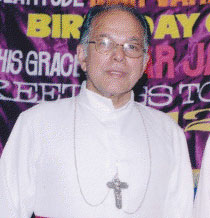
- Thoomkuzhy in 2012
- Province: Archeparchy of Trissur
- Diocese: Thrissur
- See: Thrissur
- Appointed: 11 November 1996
- Term ended: 22 January 2007
- Predecessor: Joseph Kundukulam
- Successor: Andrews Thazhath
- Other posts: Bishop of Mananthavady (1973–1995), Bishop of Thamarassery (1995–1996) Jeevan TV, Marymatha Major Seminary, Jubilee Mission Medical College and Research Institute, Jyothi Engineering College, Cheruthuruthy, Thrissur, Mahajubilee Training College

Orders
- Ordination: 22 December 1956 by Pietro Sigismondi
- Consecration: 1 May 1973 by Joseph Parecattil, Sebastian Vayalil and Sebastian Valloppilly

Personal details
- Born: 13 December 1930 Vilakumadam, Palai, Kingdom of Travancore, India (present-day Kerala, India)
- Died: 17 September 2025 (aged 94) Thrissur, Kerala, India
- Denomination: Syro-Malabar Catholic Church
- Residence: St. Mary's Minor Seminary, Madona Nagar, Thrissur, Kerala, India
- Education: Mangalapuzha Seminary, Pontifical Oriental Institute, Pontifical Lateran University, Fordham University

Mar Jacob Thoomkuzhy (13 December 1930 – 17 September 2025) was an Indian Syro-Malabar Catholic hierarch. He was the first bishop of the Mananthavady eparchy, second bishop of the Thamarassery eparchy, and the second Metropolitan archbishop of the Archeparchy of Trichur in India.

== Biography ==
Thoomkuzy was born on 13 December 1930 to Kurian and Rosa Thoomkuzhy in Vilakumadam, today a part of the state of Kerala in India and at the time a part of the Kingdom of Travancore, one of the many princely states of the British Raj. Both his parents were farmers from Pala in the Kottayam district; Jacob was the fourth amongst their twelve children. The Thoomkuzhy family later moved to Thiruvambady in Kozhikode.

In 1947, he joined the minor seminary at Changanacherry. Following a long period of philosophical study at the Aluva seminary, Thomkuzhy travelled to Rome to pursue theology. In Rome, he was ordained a priest on 22 December 1956, at the age of 26. He remained in Rome for another four years to obtain a doctorate in canon law at the Pontifical Lateran University. He served as secretary to bishop Sebastian Valloppilly Eparchy of Tellicherry and the chancellor, while also providing assistance to several parishes within the eparchy. He later became Rector of the Minor Seminary in Thalassery, before pursuing a master's degree in English literature at Fordham University in New York City.

Following more than 15 years of service, including participating in pastoral work, Pope Paul VI ordained him Bishop of the newly formed Eparchy of Mananthavady on 1 March 1973. His ordination ceremony occurred exactly two months later on 1 May. Cardinal Joseph Parecattil served as the main consecrator; Sebastian Vayalil, Bishop of the Eparchy of Palai, and Sebastian Valloppilly, Bishop of the Eparchy of Tellicherry, served as co-concentrators. As Bishop, he started the Tribal Community Development Project for the advancement of indigenous people. He founded the Society of Kristudasis (SDK) in 1977 in reaction to the pastoral and missionary needs of the people of the Manathavady eparchy. He was also the vice-president of Catholic Bishops' Conference of India (CBCI) for two terms.

After 22 years as head of Eparchy of Manathanvady, he was transferred to the position of Bishop of Thamarasserry on 18 May 1995. On 7 June 1995, he was appointed bishop of Thamarassery, and took charge of his office on 28 July 1995. On 18 December 1996, he was again transferred as the Archbishop of Trichur and was installed on 15 February 1997.

He served as archbishop until 22 January 2007, when he resigned due to old age. During his tenure, Thoomkuzhy expanded access to education within his archeparchy; he founded the Mary Matha Major Seminary in 1997, the Jyothi Engineering College in 2002, and the Jubilee Mission Medical College and Research Institute in 2003; all three of these institutions are located in the Thrissur area. Additionally, he played a key role in the launch of the Malayalam language-channel Jeevan TV in 2002.

After retiring in 2007, he resided at a local seminary. Thoomkuzy died at 2:50 pm (IST) on 17 September 2025, at the age of 94. He had been under treatment for age-related illnesses for several months prior, (Note: Some sources mislabel his age as "95".) and had been admitted to the Julibee Mission Medical College Hospital a few days earlier.

== Notes ==
Catholic Church titles
Preceded by Joseph Kundukulam	Archbishop of Trissur; 1996–2007	Succeeded by Andrews Thazhath
Preceded by Sebastian Mankuzhikary	Bishop of Thamarassery; 1995–1996	Succeeded by Paul Chittilapilly
New title	Bishop of Mananthavady; 1973–1995	Succeeded by Emmanuel Giles Pothanamuzhi
