= Joseph Kundukulam =

Roman Catholic bishop

Mar Joseph Kundukulam
- First Archbishop of Thrissur
- Province: Kerala
- Diocese: Syro-Malabar Catholic Archdiocese of Thrissur
- See: Syro-Malabar Catholic Church
- Term ended: 11 November 1996
- Predecessor: George Alapatt
- Successor: Jacob Thoomkuzhy

Orders
- Ordination: 20 December 1942
- Consecration: 4 June 1970

Personal details
- Born: 26 September 1917 Parappur, Thrissur, British India (present-day Kerala, India)
- Died: 26 April 1998 (aged 80) Wamba, Kenya
- Buried: Our Lady of Lourdes Metropolitan Cathedral, Thrissur
- Denomination: Syro-Malabar Catholic Church
- Education: Mangalapuzha Seminary

Mar Joseph Kundukulam (26 September 1917 – 26 April 1998) was the first metropolitan archbishop of the Syro-Malabar Catholic Archdiocese of Thrissur, from 1970 to 1997. Kundukulam was succeeded by Mar Jacob Thoomkuzhy. Kundukulam retired as archbishop in 1997 and died at Wamba, Kenya on 26 April 1998. His corpse was taken to Kerala by a special aircraft and was buried at Our Lady of Lourdes Metropolitan Cathedral, Thrissur on 29 April 1998.

== Career ==
Kundukulam completed his ecclesiastical studies at St Mary’s Major Seminary in Trichur and at St. Joseph's Pontifical Seminary in Aluva. Kundukulam was ordained priest on 20 December 1942. Kundukulam was a member of the pastoral ministry until he was nominated to become a Bishop. He also served as the director of St. Anne's Charitable Institute from 1958 to 1970. In 1967 Kundukulam founded St. Christina's Home in Pullazhy, which is a rehabilitation center for Unwedded mothers.

Kundukulam had a close relationship with Congress Leader K. Karunakaran. During the visit of Pope John Paul II to India in 1986, a visit to Thrissur had not been scheduled. Mar Joseph Kundukulam sent a request to Karunakaran to bring the Pope to Thrissur and Karunakaran was able to schedule a papal visit to Thrissur. Vinod Rai was the District Collector of Thrissur at that time, and the necessary arrangements were made for the papal visit. Pope visited Thrissur on February 7, 1986.
