= Andrews Thazhath =

Syro-Malabar Archbishop

Mar Andrews Thazhath
- Metropolitan Archbishop of Trichur
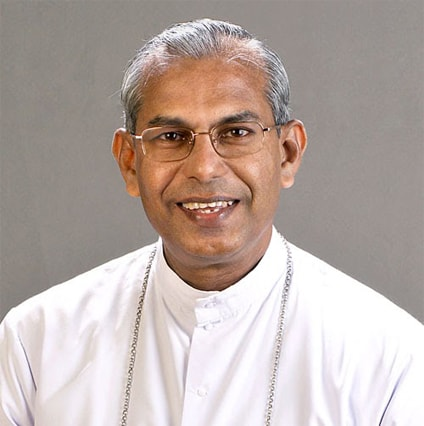
- Archdiocese: Syro-Malabar Catholic Archeparchy of Thrissur
- Province: Ecclesiastical province of Thrissur
- See: Thrissur
- Predecessor: Jacob Thoomkuzhy

Orders
- Ordination: 14 March 1977
- Consecration: 1 May 2004 by Varkey Vithayathil
- Rank: Metropolitan Archbishop

Personal details
- Born: Andrews Thazhath; 13 December 1951 (age 74) Pudukkad, Travancore-Cochin, India
- Denomination: Syro-Malabar Catholic Church
- Residence: Catholic Archbishop’s House, Thrissur
- Education: Mangalapuzha Seminary, Pontifical Oriental Institute

Mar Andrews Thazhath (Syriac: ܡܪܝ ܐܢܕܪܘܣ ܛܰܙܚܬ) (മാർ ആൻഡ്രൂസ് താഴത്ത് ) (born 13 December 1951) is an Indian Catholic prelate and Archeparch of Thrissur in the Syro-Malabar Catholic Church.

== Early life and education ==
Andrews Thazhath was born on 13 December 1951 in Pudukkad, a village in the Thrissur district of what was then Travancore-Cochin (modern-day Kerala). He completed his primary education at St. Mary's School, Pudukkad, and continued his schooling at St. Joseph's High School, Pavaratty.

In 1967, he joined the Sacred Heart Minor Seminary in Thrissur and later pursued his philosophical and theological studies at the Mangalapuzha Seminary in Aluva, affiliated with the Pontifical Institute of Philosophy and Theology. After ordination, he pursued advanced studies at the Pontifical Oriental Institute in Rome, earning a Doctorate in Canon Law (DOCL) with a focus on Eastern Canon Law.

== Priesthood ==
Thazhath was ordained a priest on 14 March 1977 by Bishop Joseph Kundukulam. His early assignments included serving as Assistant Vicar in the parishes of Ollur and Lourdes Cathedral in Thrissur, where he gained respect for his pastoral care, theological knowledge, and commitment to liturgical traditions.

He was a professor of Canon Law at the Mary Matha Major Seminary, Thrissur, and later served as Judicial Vicar of the Syro-Malabar Major Archiepiscopal Tribunal based in Ernakulam. Additionally, he held roles in the Syro-Malabar Church's Liturgical Research Centre and the Canon Law Society of India.

== Episcopate ==
=== Auxiliary Bishop of Thrissur ===
On 19 March 2004, Thazhath was appointed the Auxiliary Bishop of Thrissur and Titular Bishop of Agrippias by Pope John Paul II. He was consecrated as a bishop on 1 May 2004 by Cardinal Varkey Vithayathil, the then Major Archbishop of the Syro-Malabar Catholic Church.

=== Metropolitan Archbishop of Thrissur ===
On 22 January 2007, Thazhath was appointed the third Metropolitan Archbishop of Thrissur, succeeding Archbishop Jacob Thoomkuzhy. His installation took place on 18 March 2007 at the Lourdes Cathedral in Thrissur.

During his tenure, Archbishop Thazhath has focused on strengthening the ecclesiastical structure of the Archeparchy, promoting vocations, and expanding educational and charitable initiatives. Under his leadership, several schools, colleges, and social welfare projects have been established, particularly catering to the marginalized communities.

He has been an advocate for preserving the liturgical and canonical traditions of the Syro-Malabar Church, emphasizing the importance of the Eastern liturgical heritage. Thazhath played a key role in the revision and promotion of the Syro-Malabar Qurbana (Holy Mass) and has published several works on Canon Law and the history of the Syro-Malabar Church.

=== Leadership in the Catholic Church in India ===
Thazhath has held several prominent positions in the Indian Catholic Church. He served as secretary general of the Kerala Catholic Bishops' Council (KCBC) from 2010 to 2013 and later as its president. He was appointed the first vice president of the Catholic Bishops' Conference of India (CBCI) in 2021, and in November 2022, he was elected as the president of the CBCI, becoming the first Syro-Malabar bishop to hold this position.

In this role, Thazhath has been instrumental in addressing issues related to the church's social and educational mission in India, interfaith dialogue, and promoting communal harmony. He has also represented the Indian Church at various international forums, including meetings at the Vatican.

== Apostolic Administrator of Ernakulam-Angamaly archdiocese ==
On 30 July 2022, Archbishop Thazhath was appointed by Pope Francis as the Apostolic Administrator *sede plena* of the Syro-Malabar Catholic Major Archeparchy of Ernakulam-Angamaly, in response to internal disputes within the archeparchy over the uniform mode of celebrating the Holy Qurbana. His role was to oversee the administration and resolve conflicts within the archeparchy. He served in this position until his resignation was accepted by the Pope on 7 December 2023.

== Publications and theological contributions ==
Archbishop Thazhath is an authority on Oriental Canon Law and has contributed significantly to scholarly discourse through his writings. His key publications include:

- The Juridical Sources of the Syro-Malabar Church (1987)
- The Law of Thomas (1987)
- The Quest for Identity: The Syro-Malabar Church and Its Rite (1992)
- Various articles and papers on Eastern liturgy, canon law, and ecclesiology.

He is also a member of several Vatican commissions, including the Pontifical Council for Legislative Texts, appointed by Pope Francis in 2021.

== Awards and honors ==
- Archbishop Thazhath has been recognized for his contributions to theology, Canon Law, and the Syro-Malabar Church. He received the Kerala Catholic Bishops' Council's Award for his contributions to Canon Law and theology.
- He has also been honored by various universities and ecclesiastical institutions for his scholarly work.

== See also ==
- Syro-Malabar Catholic Church
- List of Catholic bishops of India
- Catholic Bishops' Conference of India
