= Vaidyaratnam Oushadhasala =

Indian Ayurvedic company

- Type: Private
- Industry: Pharmaceutical industry
- Genre: Ayurveda
- Founder: Eledath Thaikkattu Neelakandan Mooss
- Headquarters: Thaikkattussery, Thaikkattussery, Thrissur City, Kerala, India
- Number of locations: Thaikkattussery Chuvannamannu and Pollachi
- Area served: India, Middle East
- Key people: Eledath Thaikkattu Neelakandan Mooss
- Products: Ayurvedic medicines
- Owner: Vaidyaratnam Group
- Website: vaidyaratnammooss.com

Vaidyaratnam Oushadhasala is an Ayurvedic Pharmaceutical company situated in Thaikkattussery, near Ollur (Thrissur, Kerala). It is managed by Thaikkattusseri Eledathu Thaikkattu Family, one among the Ashtavaidya families of Kerala. Vaidyaratnam runs a NABH accredited nursing home, Vaidyaratnam Nursing Home, and an Ayurvedic medical college, apart from two ISO certified manufacturing plants in Thrissur and an R&D centre in Thaikkattussery, under the flagship of Vaidyaratnam.

== History ==
Vaidyaratnam Oushadhasala (Oushada means medicine and Sala is a building or institute) was instituted in 1941 by Eledath Thaikkattu Neelakandan Mooss.

His son, Eledath Thaikkattu Narayanan Mooss, a recipient of Padmabhushan, succeeded him at the establishment.

== Founder ==
Eledath Thaikkattu Neelakandan Mooss or E.T.Neelakandan Mooss (1904-1997) was an Ayurvedic practitioner and the founder of Vaidyaratnam Group.

After Gurukula schooling in childhood and later at Vailoppilli Sreedhara Menon Memorial Government Vocational Higher Secondary School, he learned Ashtanga Hridayam from Kuttancheri Valiya Aaryan Moose and Manu Moose. He then joined his father Ashtavaidyan E. T. Narayanan Mooss Sr., at the family clinic. In 1954, Neelakandan Mooss founded the Vaidyaratnam Oushadhasala and saw the establishment growing to include a Vaidyaratnam Nursing Home, Vaidyaratnam Ayurveda College and Ayurvedic Research Centre.

Government of India honoured him with national award Padma Shri in 1992 for his contributions to Ayurveda treatment.

== Vaidyaratnam Ayurveda College ==
Vaidyaratnam Ayurveda College
- Established: 2 October 1976
- Affiliations: Kerala University of Health Sciences
- Location: Ollur, Thrissur City, Kerala, India
- Campus: Urban
- Website: https://www.vaidyaratnamcollege.org/

Vaidyaratnam Ayurveda College is Ayurveda college situated in Thaikkattussery near Ollur. The college is affiliated to the Kerala University of Health Sciences and offers B.A.M.S. degree (Ayurveda acharya). The course is recognized by the Central Council of Indian Medicines (CCIM) and is of a duration of 5½ years and 12 months compulsory rotatory internship. Students are admitted for the BAMS course from the list of medical entrance examination conducted by the Government of Kerala. The present intake for the degree programme is 75 students.

Vaidyaratnam Ayurveda College was founded by the Ashtavaidyan Eledath Thaikkattu Neelakandan Mooss on 2 October 1976 and is under the management of Vaidyaratnam Ayurvedic Educational Society, registered under the Literary, Scientific and Charitable Societies Registration Act XII/1955. The college has two hospitals with a bed strength of about 150. Attached to the hospital, X-ray Unit and Ultra Sound scan unit are functioning.

Vaidyaratnam Ayurveda Museum
- Established: 2013
- Location: Ollur, Thrissur city, Kerala
- Type: Ayurveda history
- Owner: Vaidyaratnam Oushadhasala
- Public transit access: Ollur railway station
- Website: Official website

== Vaidyaratnam Ayurveda Museum ==
Vaidyaratnam Ayurveda Museum is a museum showcasing the richness, the variety and the evolution of the Ayurveda traditional medicine of India. The museum is located in Thaikkattussery. The museum was inaugurated by A. P. J. Abdul Kalam, former President of India, on 28 December 2013. The exhibits include a diorama presentation of the history of Ayurveda from mythological period to modern times, a library of texts on Ayurveda, descriptions of various branches of Ayurveda, an exclusive section on Susrutha, a picture gallery, a 3-D gallery, and a digital library.

== Gallery ==
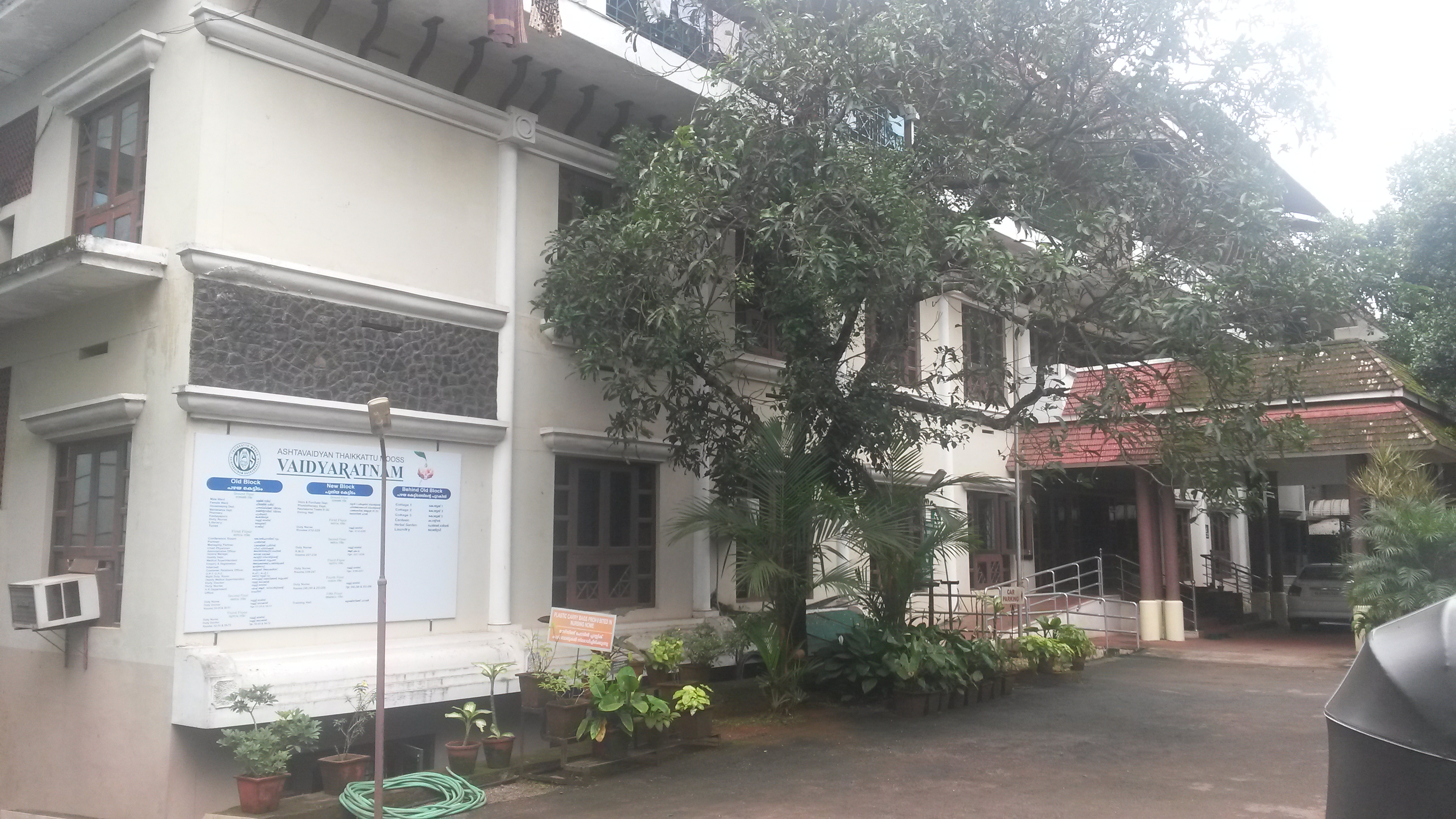
Vaidyaratnam Nursing Home building - Old Block

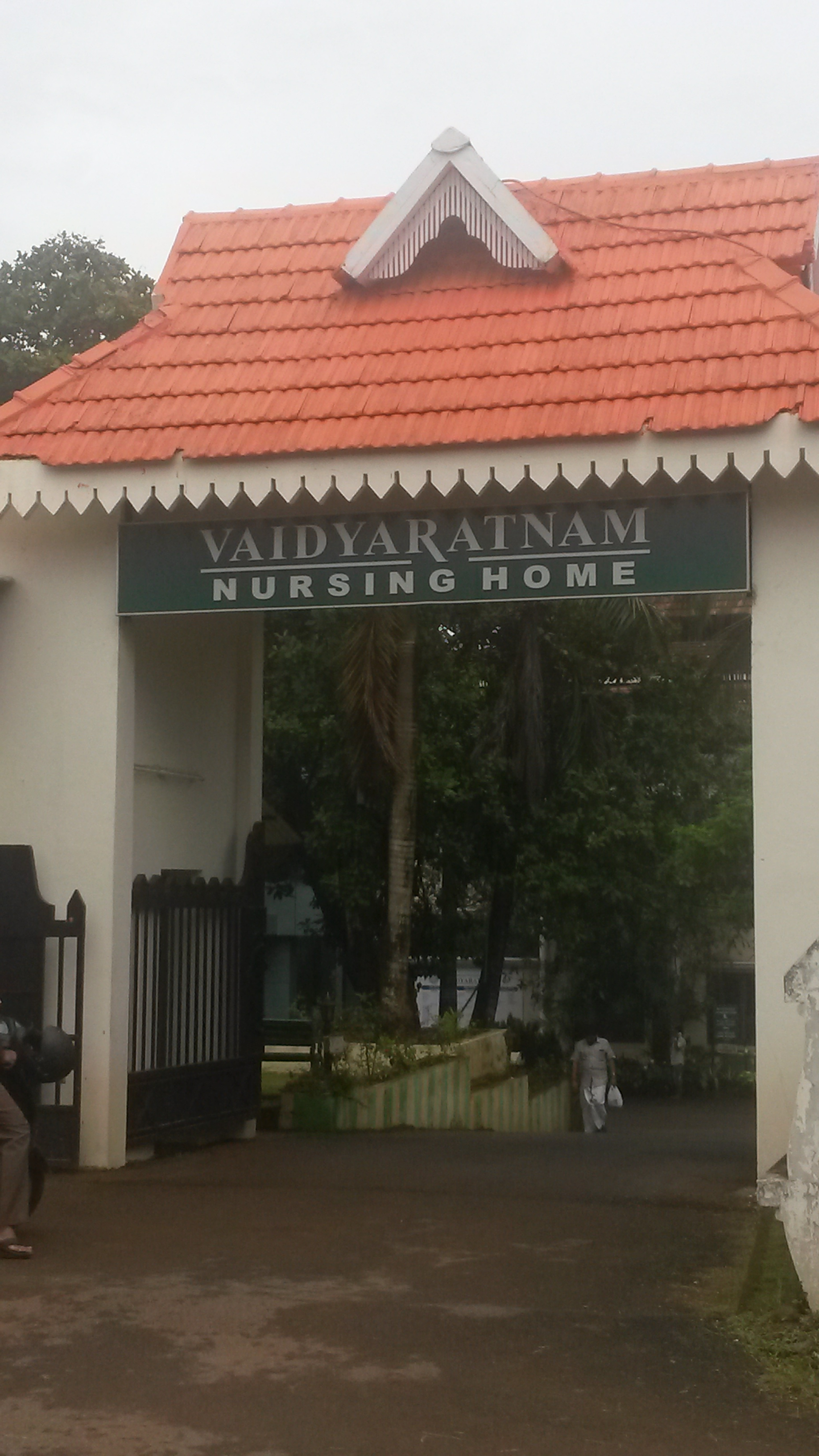
Vaidyaratnam Nursing Home entrance
