= E. T. Narayanan Mooss =

Indian physician (1933–2020)

Eledath Thaikkattu Narayanan Mooss
- Born: 15 September 1933; Ollur, Thrissur, Kerala State, India
- Died: 5 August 2020 (aged 86)
- Occupations: Physician, Business
- Spouse: Sathi Antharjanam
- Children: Neelakandan Mooss (Jr.), Parameswaran Mooss, Shailaja Mooss
- Parent(s): Eledath Thaikkattu Neelakandan Mooss; Devaki Antharjanam
- Awards: Padma Bhushan; Swadeshi Puraskar; Akshaya Puraskar; Chikitsak Guru; Lifetime Achievement Award; Living Legends Award; Best Acharya Award
- Website: Official website

Eledath Thaikkattu Narayanan Mooss (15 September 1933 – 5 August 2020) was an Ayurvedic physician, the Chief Physician and the Managing Partner of Vaidyaratnam Oushadhasala. He was awarded the Padma Bhushan in 2010 for his contribution to the field of medicine specific to Ayurveda.

== Life Sketch ==
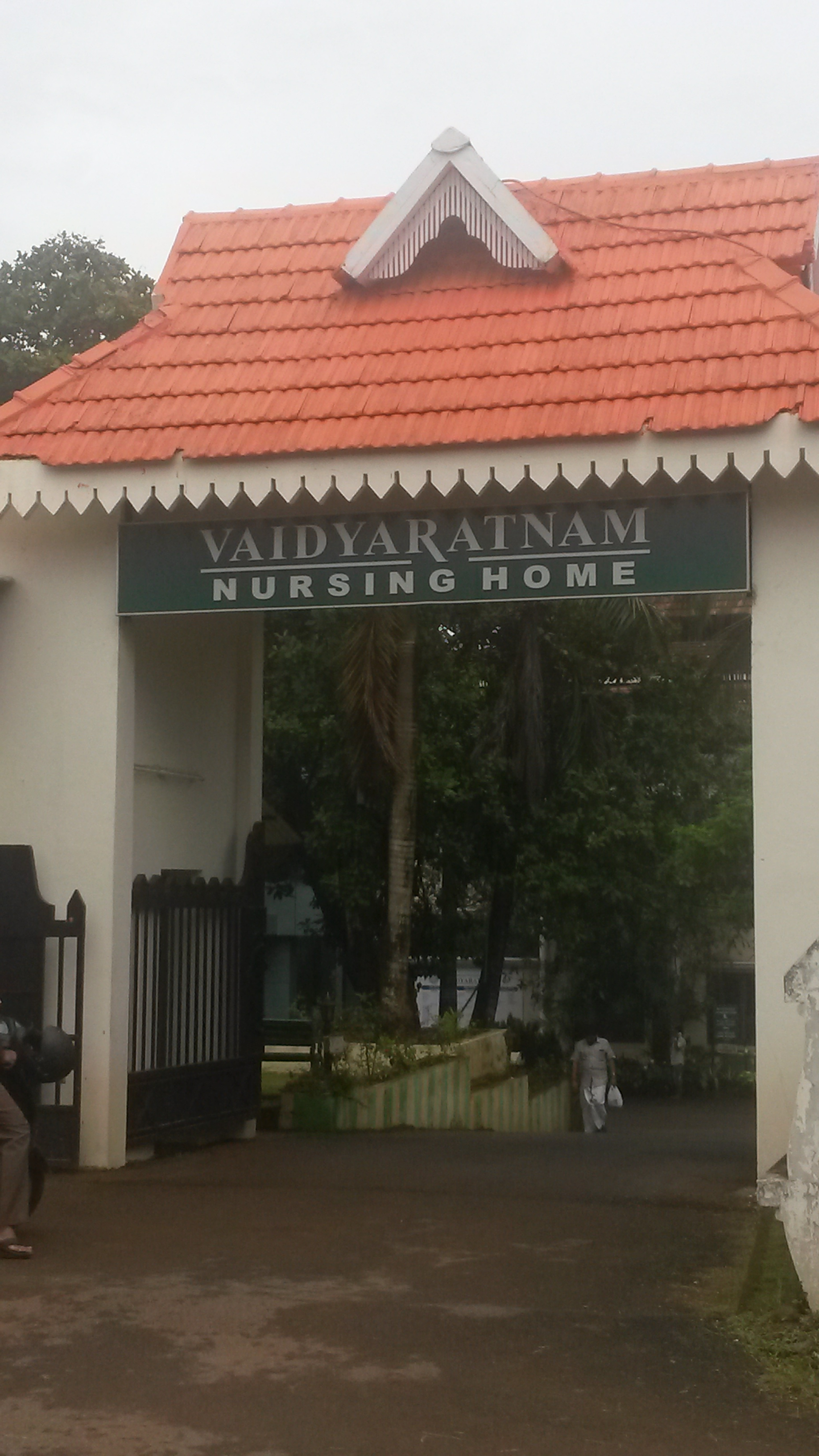
Vaidyaratnam Nursing Home Entrance

Narayanan Mooss was born on 15 September 1933. He belonged to a family of traditional Ayurvedic physicians of ashtavaidyans (a title conferred upon the family by the Viceroy of India, Lord Reading, in 1924) to Devaki Antharjanam and E. T. Neelakandhan Mooss . He was named after his grandfather, in accordance with family tradition. He learned Ayurveda from his father, a well known Ayurvedic physician and Padmashri award recipient, and his uncle, Vayaskara N.S. Mooss.

After early schooling by Gurukula system in Ollur, he joined the family's Ayurvedic clinic to assist his father, and later worked at Vaidyaratnam Oushadhasala, which his father founded in 1944. Under the rigorous tutelage of his father, Narayanan Mooss developed into a physician, widely considered to be one of the best exponents of traditional Ayurveda in India. He mastered the eight branches of Ayurvedic system of medicine.

He took over the family establishment in 1954 and developed it into a group which now comprises an Ayurvedic Medical College, two hospitals, 25 depots, 800 retail outlets, a herbal farm, a nursing college, an Ayurvedic research centre, three medicine manufacturing units and an Ayurvedic museum.

After handing over the Group's management to his elder son E. T. Neelakandan Mooss Jr. and medical responsibilities to his second son, E. T. Parameshwaran Mooss, he led a semi-retired life at his ancestral home in Ollur. He was a lover of the traditional arts of Kerala and Sanskrit literature.

== Awards ==
- Padmabhushan the Government of India, in 2010.
- Swadeshi Puraskar, instituted by the Swadeshi Jagaran Foundation for the year 1997 for services to Ayurveda from then Prime Minister of India, A. B. Vajpayee.
- Akshaya Puraskar in 1988 for contribution to Ayurveda
- Chikitsak Guru, a title from Rashtriya Ayurveda Vidyapeeth, Government of India in 1991.
- Life time Achievement Award in 2006 from Association of Chambers of Commerce
- Living Legends Award in 2006 from Rotary Club, Thrissur
- Best Acharya Award in 2010 by Government of Kerala.

== See also ==
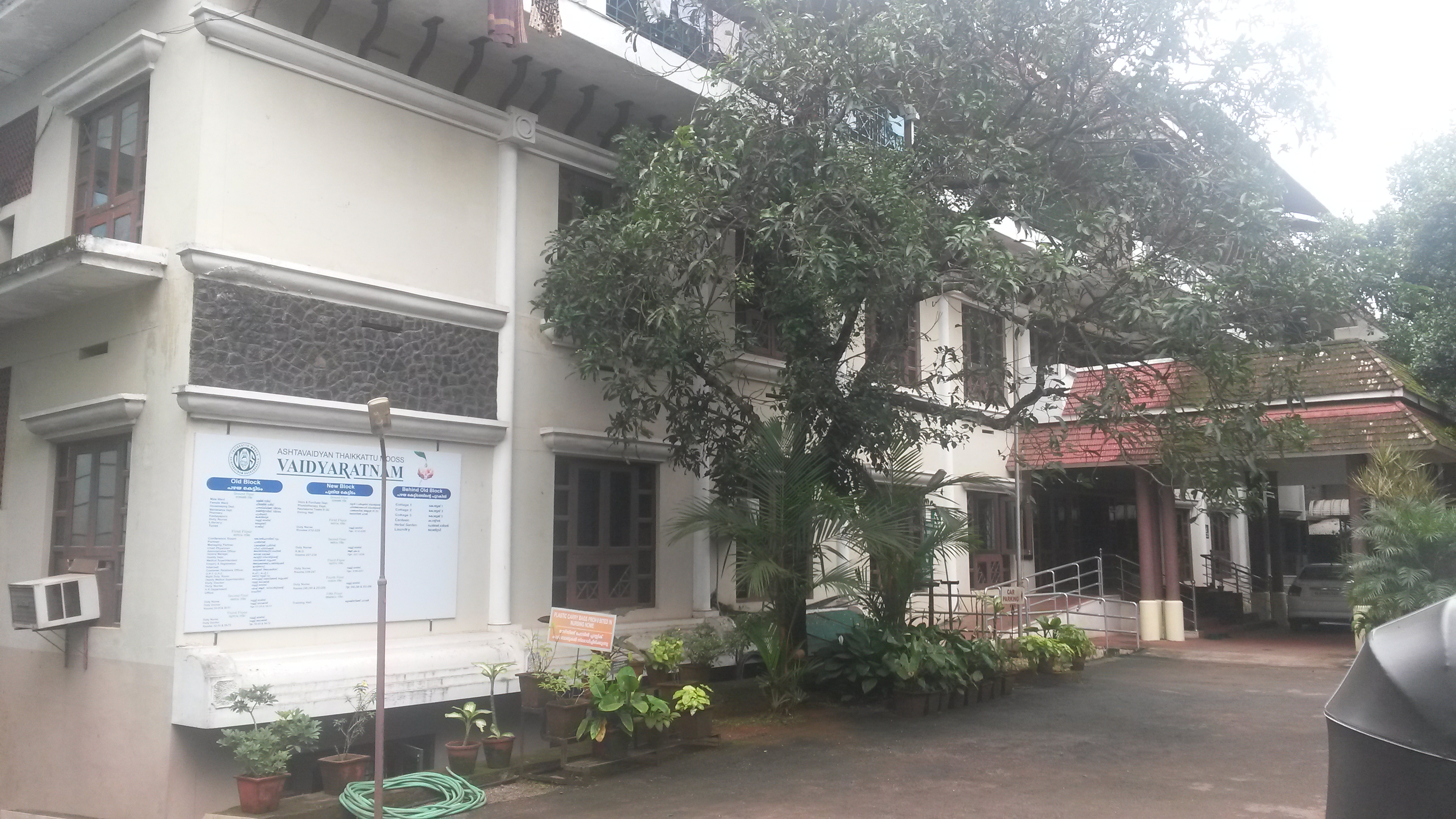
Vaidyaratnam Nursing Home building - Old Block

- Eledath Thaikkattu Neelakandan Mooss
- Vaidyaratnam Oushadhasala
