= Thalore =

Suburb in Kerala, India

- Suburb
- Location in Kerala, India
- Coordinates: 10.454885°N 76.253577°E
- Country: India
- State: Kerala
- District: Thrissur

Government
  - Type: LDF
  - Body: Thrissur Municipal Corporation, Nenmanikkara Grama Panchayath
- Elevation: 20 m (66 ft)

Languages
  - Official: Malayalam, English
- Time zone: UTC+5:30 (IST)
- PIN: 680306
- Telephone code: 91 487 235
- Vehicle registration: KL-08
- Website: http://www.thalore.com
- Temperature Range: 22.5°C - 35 °C

Thalore is a suburb situated 9 km south of Thrissur city in Kerala, India. It is a part of Thrissur Municipal Corporation and Nenmanikkara Grama Panchayat.

== Etymology ==
Since Thalore is situated at a slightly higher altitude compared to neighbouring villages it got the name Thaloor (Malayalam: തലൂര്) from the two Malayalam words തല (meaning head) and ഊര് (meaning place). Thaloor later became Thalore.

== Geography ==
The Infant Jesus Church at a height of 96 feet above sea level, is the highest situated structure in the village. From there, the terrain slowly tapers down towards all sides; the village boundary is approximately 30 feet above sea level.

== Transportation ==
Old NH-47 to Thrissur passes through Thalore centre. The new NH-544 by-pass to Palakkad is now the south-east boundary. Thaikkattussery road connects the old NH-47 from Thalore centre to Thaikkattussery. Both KSRTC and private bus services connect Thalore to Thrissur in the north and Amballur, Pudukkad, Kodakara and Chalakkudy in the south. The nearest railway stations are Ollur and Pudukkad stations where local passenger services stop. Express trains are available from Thrissur.

== Economy ==
In the 1970s, the paddy fields became economically non-viable, and were soon turned into clay brick farms. Thalore and its neighbouring places became the epicenter of this clay brick business, and it remains a major source of income for villagers. Like any other village in Kerala, Thalore also has a significant non-resident kerala community which also brings resources to the village.

== Educational Institutions ==
- Navajyothi College, Thalore
- Deepthi Higher Secondary School, Thalore
- Deepthi Higher Secondary School (Unaided), Thalore
- Deepthi High School, Thalore
- Jesus Academy CBSE School, Thalore
- St. Teresita's Upper Primary School, Thalore
- Little Flower Lower Primary School, Thalore
- Nazareth English Medium Nursery School, Thalore
- Jesus Academy Kindergarten and Daycare, Thalore

== Religious Institutions ==
- Infant Jesus Parish Church, Thalore
- Infant Jesus Monastery Church, Thalore
- Infant Jesus Monastery, Thalore
- Chapel of St. Theresa, Thalore
- Jerusalem Retreat Centre, Thalore
- Vocationist Fathers (Fr. Justin Vocationary) S.D.V. Minor Seminary, Thalore
- Navajyothi Bhavan (CHF), Thalore
- Our Lady of Lourdes (CHF), Thalore
- Laverna Bhavan (FSSH), Thalore

== Industry ==
There are around 10 tile and brick factories operate in Thalore.
