= Euphrasia Eluvathingal =

Catholic nun from Kerala, India (1877–1952)

Saint Euphrasia Eluvathingal C.M.C.

Religious
- Born: Rosa Eluvathingal; 17 October 1877; Aranattukara, Thrissur, Kerala, India
- Died: 29 August 1952 (aged 74); St. Mary's Convent, Ollur
- Venerated in: Catholic Church
- Beatified: 3 December 2006, Square of the Parish Church of Saint Antony, Ollur, Kerala, India by Cardinal Varkey Vithayathil
- Canonized: 23 November 2014, Saint Peter's Square, Vatican City by Pope Francis
- Feast: 30 August
- Attributes: Religious habit

Euphrasia Eluvathingal (born Rosa Eluvathingal; 17 October 1877 – 29 August 1952) was an Indian Carmelite nun of the Syro-Malabar Church, which is an Eastern Catholic Church in Kerala. Euphrasia is said to have had a vision of the Holy Family, at which point the illness she had long felt ceased. She was canonised as a saint by Pope Francis on 23 November 2014 in Vatican City. Since the beheading of St. John the Baptist is celebrated on 29 August, the feast of St. Euphrasia is moved to 30 August.

== Early life ==
She was born Rosa Eluvathingal on 17 October 1877 in a Syro Malabar Church Nasrani family in Kattoor, Irinjalakuda, Thrissur district, in Kerala.

== Religious life ==
Rose entered the boarding school of the Congregation of the Mother of Carmel at Koonammavu, the first indigenous congregation of Syro-Malabars.

From 1904 to 1913 Sr Euphrasia served as novice mistress at St Joseph's Convent. From 1913 to 1916 she was Mother Superior of the Convent of St Mary at Ollur. She endeavoured to lead a life of constant prayer and of devotion to the Sacred Heart of Jesus, becoming known to many people as the Praying Mother. She died on 29 August 1952.

== Miracles ==
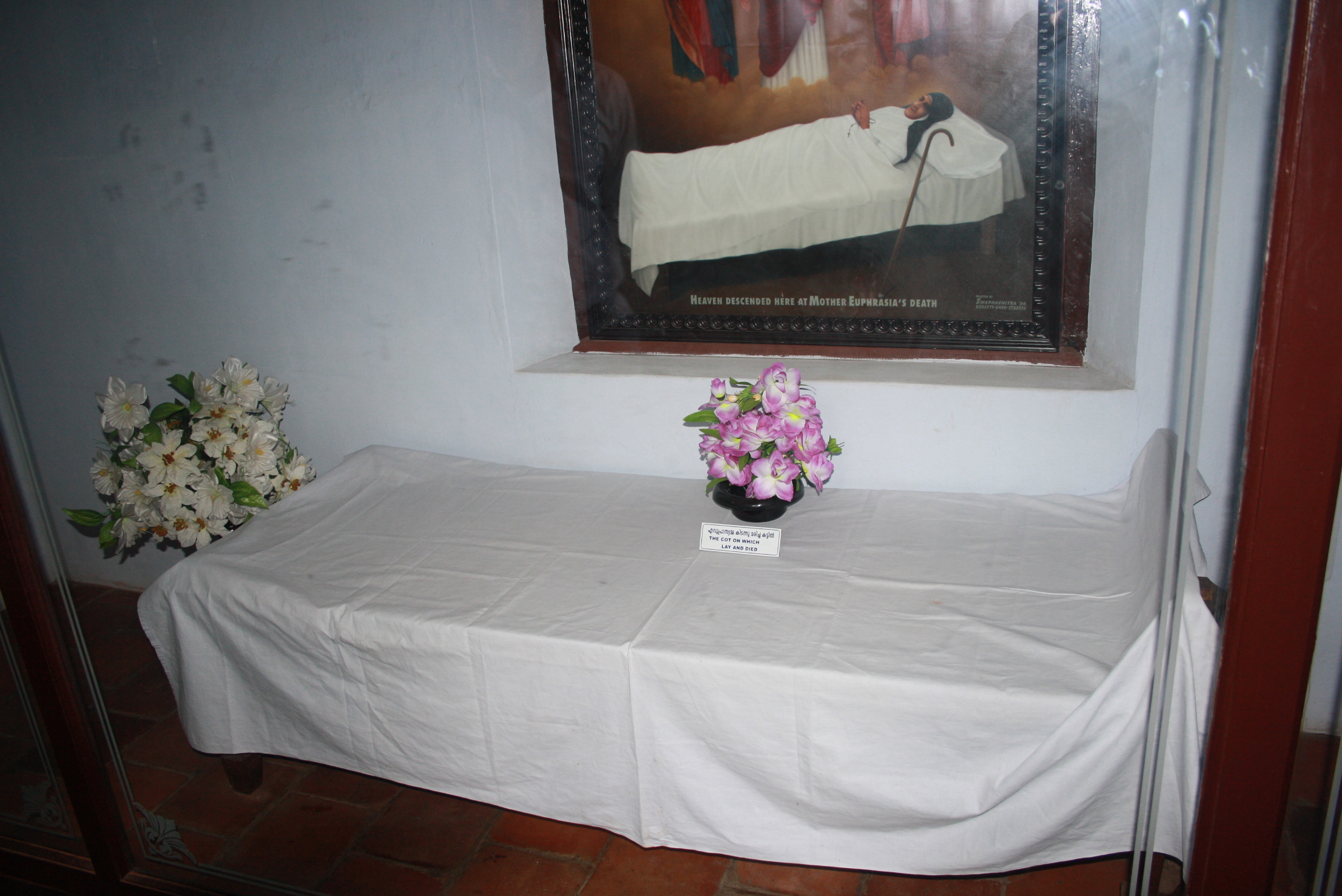
The bed where Euphrasia died in St Mary's convent, Ollur, Thrissur, shown in the museum.

The first reported miracle was curing a carpenter from bone cancer. Thomas Tharakan from Anchery in Ollur, a furniture polishing worker, was diagnosed with cancer by the Jubilee Mission Medical College and Research Institute in Thrissur. Thomas was admitted to the hospital for one week. Later before the surgery, a scan by the doctor showed no sign of tumour, despite an earlier scan report showing clear evidence of a tumour. Thomas's sister, Rosy, later claimed that cure was the result of her prayer to Euphrasia.

The second reported miracle happened to a seven-year-old child named Jewel from Aloor in Thrissur District. The child had a tumour in his neck which made it difficult for him to swallow any food. Doctors at Dhanya Hospital in Potta, Thrissur District, had said that this disease was incurable. As Jewel's family came from a poor background, their only option was to pray for divine intercession. After his grandmother prayed to Euphrasia, doctors noticed that his tumour began to shrink. Dr Sasikumar of Dhanya Hospital examined him once again and found the tumour to have disappeared. Many other doctors examined the boy and stated that there was no medical basis for this event.

== Veneration ==
On 27 September 1986 the process of canonisation began in Ollur. Father Lucas Vithuvatikal CMI was subsequently appointed as Postulator. On 29 August 1987 and Euphrasia was declared a "Servant of God" on the same day.

Sister Perigrin was appointed as Vice-Postulator on 9 September 1987 and in 1988 a Diocesan Tribunal for the Cause of Euphrasia was established by Kundukulam, established an apostolic miracle on 8 January 1989. and concluded its work on 19 June 1991. On 30 January 1990 the tomb of Euphrasia was opened and her remains were transferred to a newly built tomb inside the chapel of St. Mary's Convent. Her case was submitted to the Congregation for the Causes of Saints, Rome, on 20 April 1994, and on 5 July 2002 Pope John Paul II declared her "Venerable".

She was beatified on 3 December 2006 in St. Anthony's Forane Church, Ollur, with the declaration of the Major Archbishop, Varkey Vithayathil, on behalf of Pope Benedict XVI.

On 3 April 2014, Pope Francis authorised the Congregation for the Causes of Saints to promulgate the decrees concerning the miracle attributed to Euphrasia's intercession. This confirmed the Pope's approval of Euphrasia's canonisation. At a special Mass held at St Peter's Square at Vatican City on 23 November 2014, Pope Francis canonised Euphrasia as a saint. Mother Sancta, Mother General of Congregation of the Mother of Carmel (CMC), carried the relics of Euphrasia to the altar.

== See also ==
- Saint Euphrasia Eluvathingal, patron saint archive
