= Malabars =

Historical term for people associated with the Malabar region

Malabars (Malayalam: [mɐlɐbaːr]) is a historical term used by Arab, Portuguese, Dutch and other European traders for people originating from the Malabar region of southwestern India. The term broadly referred to inhabitants of the Malabar Coast, including present-day northern and central Kerala and adjoining regions.

Historically, the term Malabar was also used by Europeans in a wider ethnolinguistic sense. Tamil-speaking populations of Sri Lanka and South India were frequently identified by European colonial writers as "Malabars", while Tamil itself was often referred to as the "Malabar language" in early colonial records and dictionaries.

Captain João Ribeiro in his History of Ceylon presented to the King of Portugal in 1685 mentions that Jaffnapatam (present-day Jaffna in Sri Lanka) was inhabited by "Malabars". This designation stemmed from the presence of Tamil communities in Jaffna, whose customs and religious practices resembled those found on the Malabar Coast.

== Historical and cultural significance ==
The Malabar region became globally significant from ancient times due to the spice trade, maritime commerce and the development of classical Kerala culture. Arab traders, Chinese travellers and later Portuguese, Dutch and British colonial powers maintained extensive commercial relations with the Malabar Coast, especially for black pepper, cardamom and medicinal herbs.

Malabar also emerged as one of the principal centres for the preservation and transmission of classical Ayurveda in India. Several traditional physician families known as the Ashtavaidya lineages originated from or were associated with the region. These hereditary physician families specialised in all eight branches of Ayurveda and preserved classical Sanskrit medical texts including the Ashtanga Hridayam.

Among the notable Ashtavaidya traditions of Malabar is the Pulamanthole Mooss lineage from present-day Malappuram district, Kerala.

== Pulamanthole Mooss tradition ==
The Pulamanthole Mooss family, based in Pulamanthole in Malappuram district, Kerala, has historically been associated with the preservation and practice of classical Kerala Ayurveda. The family belongs to the Ashtavaidya tradition, a hereditary group of physician families renowned for expertise in all eight branches of Ayurveda.

The Pulamanthole tradition is closely associated with the study and clinical application of the Ashtanga Hridayam, one of the foundational texts of Ayurveda attributed to Vagbhata.

Pulamanthole later emerged as an important centre for traditional Ayurvedic treatment and education in Malabar. Institutions associated with the lineage include Pulamanthole Mooss Ayurveda Hospital and related treatment centres dedicated to Panchakarma, neurological rehabilitation, musculoskeletal disorders and hereditary conditions.

The lineage has been represented by several noted physicians including Ashtavaidyan Pulamanthole Sankaran Mooss, Ashtavaidyan Sree Raman Mooss, Ashtavaidyan Aryan Narayanan Mooss and Ashtavaidyan Jayasankaran Mooss.

The Pulamanthole Mooss tradition gained recognition in Kerala cultural history through associations with Carnatic musician Chembai Vaidyanatha Bhagavatar, who reportedly underwent Ayurvedic treatment under the Pulamanthole tradition after experiencing voice-related health issues.

== Ayurveda and Malabar identity ==
Ayurveda formed a major component of Malabar’s historical identity. Traditional physician families, temple-based healing systems, medicinal plant cultivation and Sanskrit scholarship contributed significantly to the intellectual and medical heritage of the region.

The Ashtavaidya families of Kerala, including the Pulamanthole Mooss lineage, played an important role in preserving classical Ayurvedic literature and clinical practice during periods of colonial transition and social change. Their influence contributed to Kerala becoming internationally recognised as a centre for traditional Ayurvedic medicine.

== See also ==
- Malabar district
- Malabar Coast
- Ashtavaidya
- Pulamanthole
- Ayurveda
