= St. Mary's Convent, Ollur =

Roman Catholic convent in Ollur, India

St. Mary's Convent is a Roman Catholic convent situated in Ollur, Thrissur city of India. It is the first convent in the present territory started by the Syro-Malabar Catholic Archeparchy of Thrissur. It has become a great tourist and pilgrimage attraction after the Canonisation of Euphrasia Eluvathingal (Evuprasiamma).It is a modern convent compared to the other monasteries.

== History ==
The convent was started by the Metropolitan Archbishop of Thrissur John Menachery. It opened the door for the nuns on 24 May 1900. Saint Euphrasia Eluvathingal (Evuprasiamma) stayed in this convent from 1900 till death. She was the Assistant Superior and in-charge of the novices from 1904 to 1910. During this period, Blessed Maria Theresa Chiramel also stayed in the convent. From 1913 to 1916, she was the Superior of the convent.
