= Vailoppilli Sreedhara Menon Memorial Government Vocational Higher Secondary School =

Vailoppilly Sreehara Menon Memorial Government Vocational Higher Secondary School

Location
- Ollur, Thrissur, Kerala, India]
- Coordinates: 10.4877°N 76.2396°E

Information
- Type: Government School
- Established: 1918; 108 years ago
- School district: Thrissur
- Campus size: 5.5-acre
- Campus type: Urban
- Affiliation: Kerala State Education Board

Vailoppilly Sreedhara Menon Memorial Government Vocational Higher Secondary School, commonly known as GVHSS, Ollur, is a vocational higher secondary school situated in Ollur, Thrissur City and run by the state government of Kerala, in India. It is named after the poet Vyloppilli Sreedhara Menon, who was headmaster from 1936 to 1966.

== History ==
The school was started in 1918 by St. Anthony's Forane Church in Ollur, and was later handed over to the government of Kerala. It is situated on 5.5 acres of land. Thrissur Municipal Corporation looks after the school's maintenance.

== Notable alumni ==
- Mullanezhi, poet, lyricist and actor
- Swami Ranganathananda, president of the Ramakrishna Math and Mission
- Eledath Thaikkattu Neelakandan Mooss, Ayurveda practitioner
- V. R. Krishnan Ezhuthachan, freedom fighter
- CG Janardhanan, Member of Kerala Legislature (Chalakudy)
