= Jerusalem Center =

Jerusalem Center, or Jerusalem Centre, may refer to:

== Educational facilities ==
- BYU Jerusalem Center, the short name for the Brigham Young University Jerusalem Center for Near Eastern Studies, located on Mount of Olives in East Jerusalem
- Fuchsberg Center, the short name for the Fuchsberg Jerusalem Center for Conservative Judaism, located in Jerusalem
- Jerusalem Music Centre, an institute for musical education in Mishkenot Sha’ananim, Jerusalem
- Jerusalem Retreat Center, a Catholic charismatic renewal centre in Thalore, Thrissur city in Kerala, India
- Jerusalem Theatre, or The Jerusalem Centre for the Performing Arts, located in Jerusalem
- Notre Dame of Jerusalem Center, a pontifical institute founded in 1978 in Jerusalem
- Willy Brandt Center Jerusalem, a centre intended to allow encounters between German, Israeli and Palestinian youth in Jerusalem

== Organizations ==
- Jerusalem Center for Public Affairs, an Israeli think tank specializing in public diplomacy and foreign policy founded in 1976
- Jerusalem Center for the Visual Arts, an international artists-in-residence program that hosts artists and curators in Israel
- Jerusalem Center for Women, a feminist organization that advocates for women's rights and to reduce hostilities between Palestine and Israel
- Jerusalem Media & Communication Centre, a Palestinian non-governmental organization based in East Jerusalem

== See also ==
- International Convention Center (Jerusalem)
- Jerusalem central bus station
- Jerusalem–Central railway station
- Center for Jewish–Christian Understanding and Cooperation in Jerusalem
