= Nadan panthu kali =

Team field sport played in Kerala

- Highest governing body: All-Kerala Native Ball Federation
- Nicknames: Vettu panthu, Kuttipanthu
- First played: 1900s, Kottayam
- Clubs: 26 (as of 2015)

Characteristics
- Contact: No
- Team members: 7 per side
- Mixed-sex: No
- Type: Outdoor
- Equipment: Stuffed leather ball
- Venue: Pitch

Presence
- Country or region: Kerala, India
- Olympic: No

Nādan panthu kali (transl. Native ball game) is a team sport native to the state of Kerala, India. It is played in rural areas with a stuffed leather ball between two teams of seven players each. The sport originated in Kottayam in early 1900s and is also played in villages in Pathanamthitta and Alappuzha. It is held usually during the festival of Onam and on summer vacation.

== History ==
Nādan panthu kali (native ball game) originated in Kottayam in early 1900s. Several tournaments were held in 1950s and 1960. It is played mostly in Kottayam, but also in villages in Pathanamthitta and Alappuzha, usually during the festival of Onam. Over the years, the sport was played during summer vacation on school grounds, churches, and post-harvest paddy fields at rural areas, such as Puthuppally, Vakathanam, Anchery, Meenadam, Pathamuttom, Pampady, Manarcaud and adjoining areas.

== Characteristics ==
The game is similar to cricket. It has six innings, known as vara, they are otta, petta, pidiyan, thalam, keezhu, and indan. It is played between two teams of seven players each, barefoot on a 35m × 75m court. Ball is made of salt-dried leather. In each inning, both the teams are allowed to do vettu where they initiate the scoring and other team prevents from the scoring. Scoring points follow the sequence like otta, petta, pidiyan, thalm, keezhu, indan and then it repeats. The team which score the most points from the innings wins.

== In present-day ==
Revival attempts began in 2012 with the formation of the All-Kerala Native Ball Federation. As of 2015, a total of 26 teams are registered with the federation, out of which 24 are from Kottayam and two from Idukki district. Tournament seasons are from January to May and on Onam holidays. Tournaments are held at Kottayam, Pathanamthitta, and Alappuzha.
