= Saint Antony's Syro-Malabar Church, Ollur =

Catholic parish church in Kerala, India

St. Anthony's Forane Church
- Saint Anthony's Syro-Malabar Catholic Forane Church
- Ollūr Malakapally
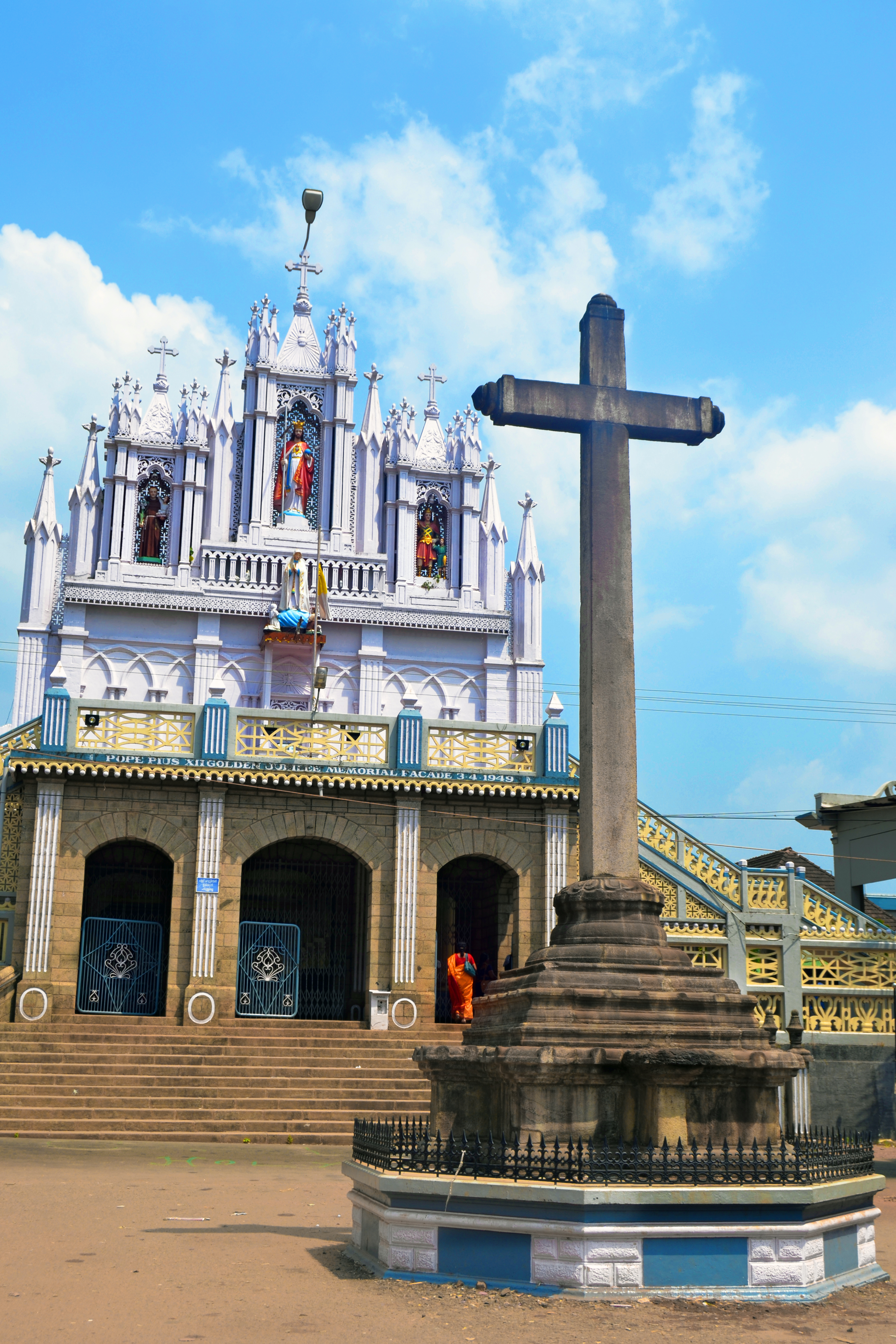
- Front view of the St. Antony's Syro-Malabar Catholic Forane Church
- St. Anthony's Forane Church
- 10.484°N 76.235°E
- Location: Ollur, Thrissur, Kerala, India
- Denomination: Catholic Church
- Sui iuris church: Syro-Malabar Church
- Website: www.ollurshrine.org/ollur/index.htm

History
- Founded: 1718; 308 years ago
- Consecrated: 1718

Architecture
- Functional status: Active

Specifications
- Materials: Sand, gravel, cement, mortar, steel

Administration
- Archdiocese: Thrissur

Clergy
- Archbishop: Andrews Thazhath

The St. Antony's Syro-Malabar Catholic Forane Church is located at Ollur, Thrissur city in Kerala, India. The church belongs to Syro-Malabar Catholic Archdiocese of Thrissur. According to rough figures there are around 4,000 Christian families in the parish. Because of the huge presence of Christian people in Ollur, with its religious, educational, medical, social-service, and secular organisations and institution, Ollur has been called as Chinna Roma (Small Rome). The church is constructed on a hill-top which is the highest location in the area. The church is surrounded by a huge protective compound wall called Elephant Wall (Aana Mathil). When Thrissur Vicariate Apostolic was erected in 1887, Ollur was the richest, most populous, and influential parish, so much that the Vicar of the Ollur parish were included in Adolph Medlycott's four-member diocesan apex council. St. Anthony's Forane Church has 18 churches under its jurisdiction.

== History ==
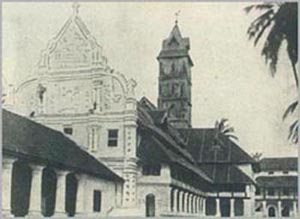
A 1938 photo of St. Anthony's Forane Church, Ollur, photo published in the Cochin Government Royal War Efforts Souvenir

Previously, the Ollur Christian population went to Mass in Puzuvial church. One day one of the women of the Chiramel family missed Mass in Puzuvial church. Disappointed, she told this to her son and asked him to construct a church in Ollur. After this, land donated by Malaekal Karthakal was used for building a new church in Ollur. According to church records, in 1718 a temporary church was constructed and the first Mass was conducted.

The church was blessed on 13 June 1722, by the Mar Antony Pimentel, Metropolitan and Gate of All India or known as Kodungallur Bishop with Johann Ernst Hanxleden famously known as Arnos Paathiri. In 1790, Tipu Sultan set fire to church but only the facade was burnt. In 1972, Mar Joseph Kundukulam, the first Archbishop of Thrissur, banned the Thullal (popularly known as devil dancing). Beatified people Euphrasia Eluvathingal, Maria Theresa Chiramel and Kuriakose Elias Chavara have visited and stayed in the church. India's first Prime Minister Jawaharlal Nehru visited the church on 24 November 1951. Vicar Monsignor Paul Kakkassery welcomed Nehru by handing over a large candle lighted.

== Festivals ==
Feast of Saint Raphael, Ollur, the Archangel, is the most important festival of Ollur church falling on 23 and 24 October of each year. The festival was started in 1837. Another festival is in honor of Saint Sebastian in the month of January and is the second major festival in the parish. Also, Ollur parish celebrates around 73 feasts and festivals in the calendar year.

== Art and architecture ==
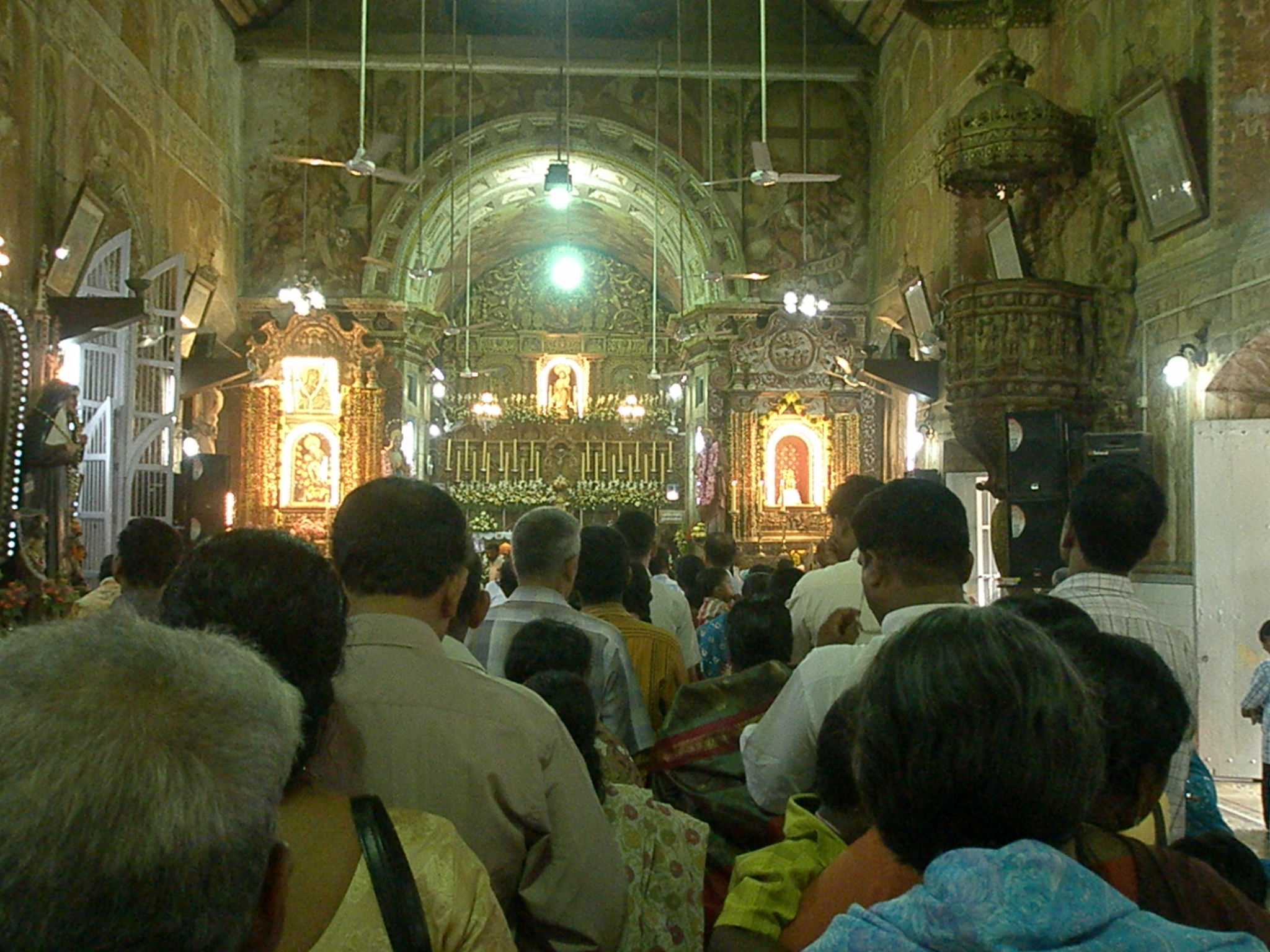
An inside view of the St. Anthony's Forane Church, Ollur

If there is any church in Kerala which can be compared with Sistine Chapel in the Vatican City, that is St. Anthony's Forane Church in Ollur. Every inch of space in the church is decorated, under both western and indigenous influences, with the highest achievements of the painter, the sculptor, the ceramics worker, the carpenter, the goldsmith, the bronze artisan, or the architect - using every media known or imaginable like gold, silver, iron, bronze, wood, ivory, stone - including laterite, granite, and precious stones.

A unique feature of the church is the number and variety of the angel images in the church. There are more than five thousand images of angels in the church, in fresco, mural, wood, plaster, stone, metal and ivory. The paintings of the church cover an area of thousands of square feet and are considered one of the most beautiful ones in entire Kerala.

=== Belfry ===
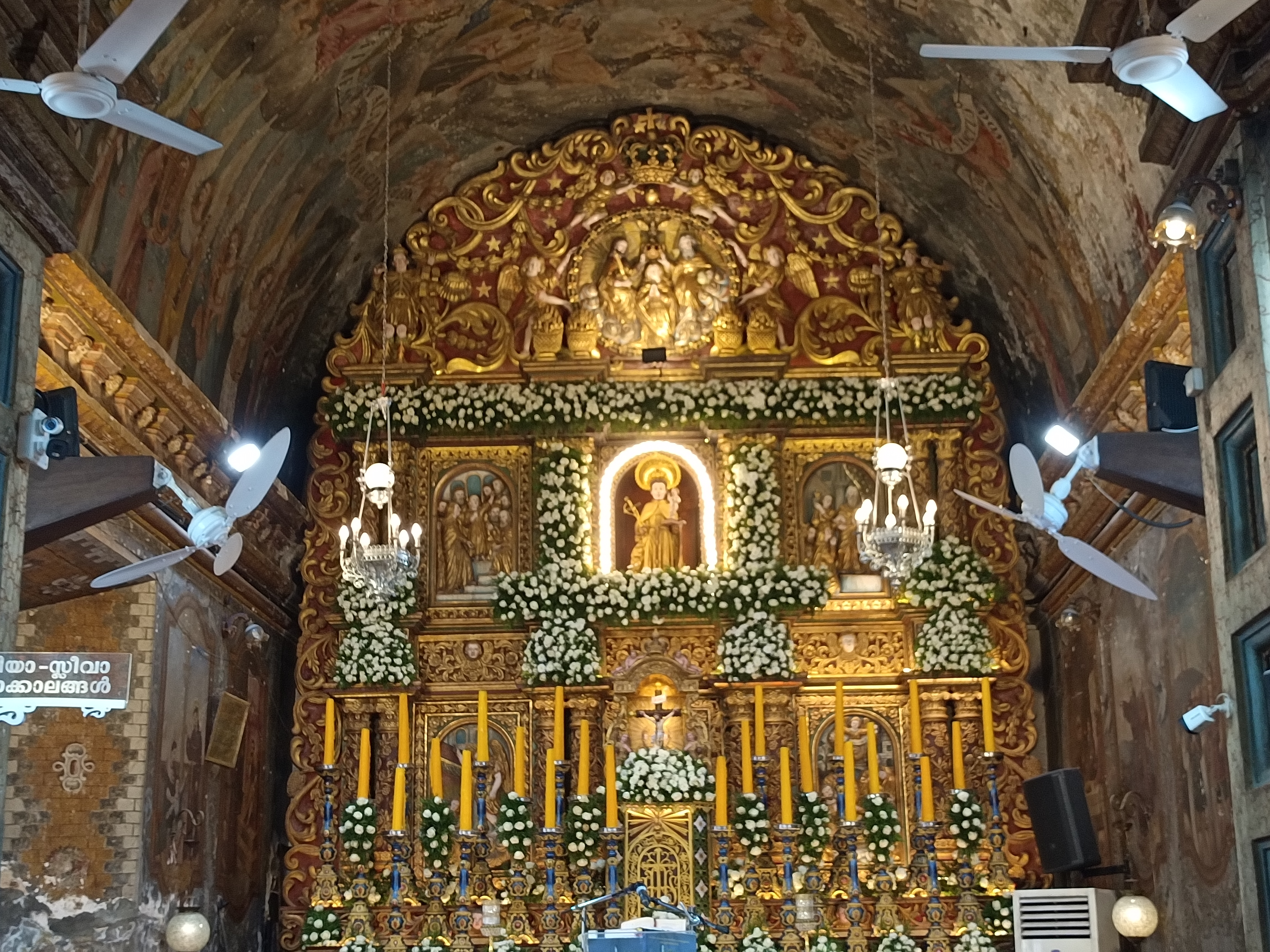
Altar of St. Antony's Forane Church, Ollur, Kerala

The seven storey belfry or bell tower (125 feet [38 m]) of the church is said to be the tallest structure in South India when it was constructed. The huge three bells in the bell tower were imported from Marseille in France (1883–1892) in 19th century and is one of biggest bells in Kerala. The bells are inscribed with the pictures of Jesus, Saint Joseph, Mary (mother of Jesus), Saint Anthony, Raphael (archangel) and Tobias. Owned by Ollur church is written in the bells in Syriac language and Malayalam.

== Liberation struggle ==
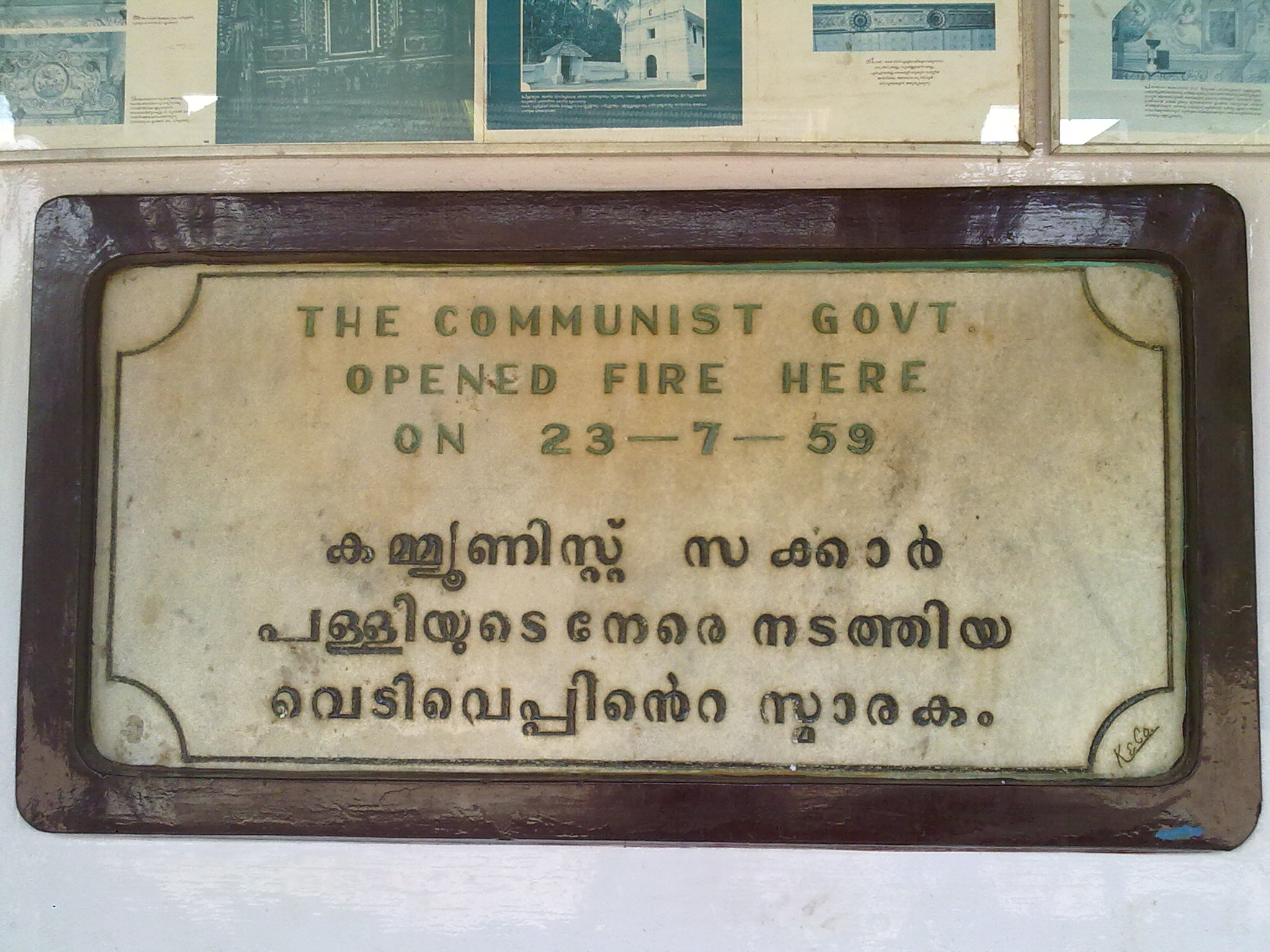
The plaque inside the St. Anthony's Forane Church for the memorial of Liberation Struggle

In 1959 Catholics took to the streets of Kerala to protest against the first Communist Government in the state headed by E. M. S. Namboodiripad. The rebellion was caused by a state legislation that would have potentially taken over Catholic education facilities under government control. This was known as Vimochana Samaram or Liberation Struggle. In the same year, on 23 July, Kerala Police fired at the St. Anthony's Forane Church on the part of Liberation Struggle. A memorial had been erected at the church courtyard then. The memorial says, Communist Government fired bullets to the Church here. The struggle of 1959 had led to the dismissal of the first democratically elect Communist Government in the world.

== Churches under Ollur Forane ==
Churches under OLLUR FORANE

1. Ollur, St. Antony’s Forane Church.
2. Ammadom, St. Antony Church
3. Kodannur, St.Antony Church
4. Marathakkara, Mary Immaculate Church
5. Padavarad St. Thomas Church
6. Palakkal, St. Mathew Church
7. Pallissery, St. Mary Church
8. Perinchery, Sacred Heart Church
9. Pootharackal, St. Rocky’s Church
10. Pulakkatukara, Our lady of Carmel Church.
11. Thaikkatussery, St. Paul Church
12. Thalore, Infant Jesus Church
13. Vallachira, St. Thomas Church
14. Venginissery, St. Mary Church
15. Chiyyaram, Vijayamatha Church
16. Angel Nagar Mary Matha Church
17. Konikkara, Fathima Natha Church
18. Avinissery, St. Joseph Church
19. Anchery, St Mary’s Church (ST)
20. Chiyyaram(Galilee Church) (ST)
21. Panamkulam, St Francis Assisi Church (ST) Arattupuzha

== Institutions under the parish ==
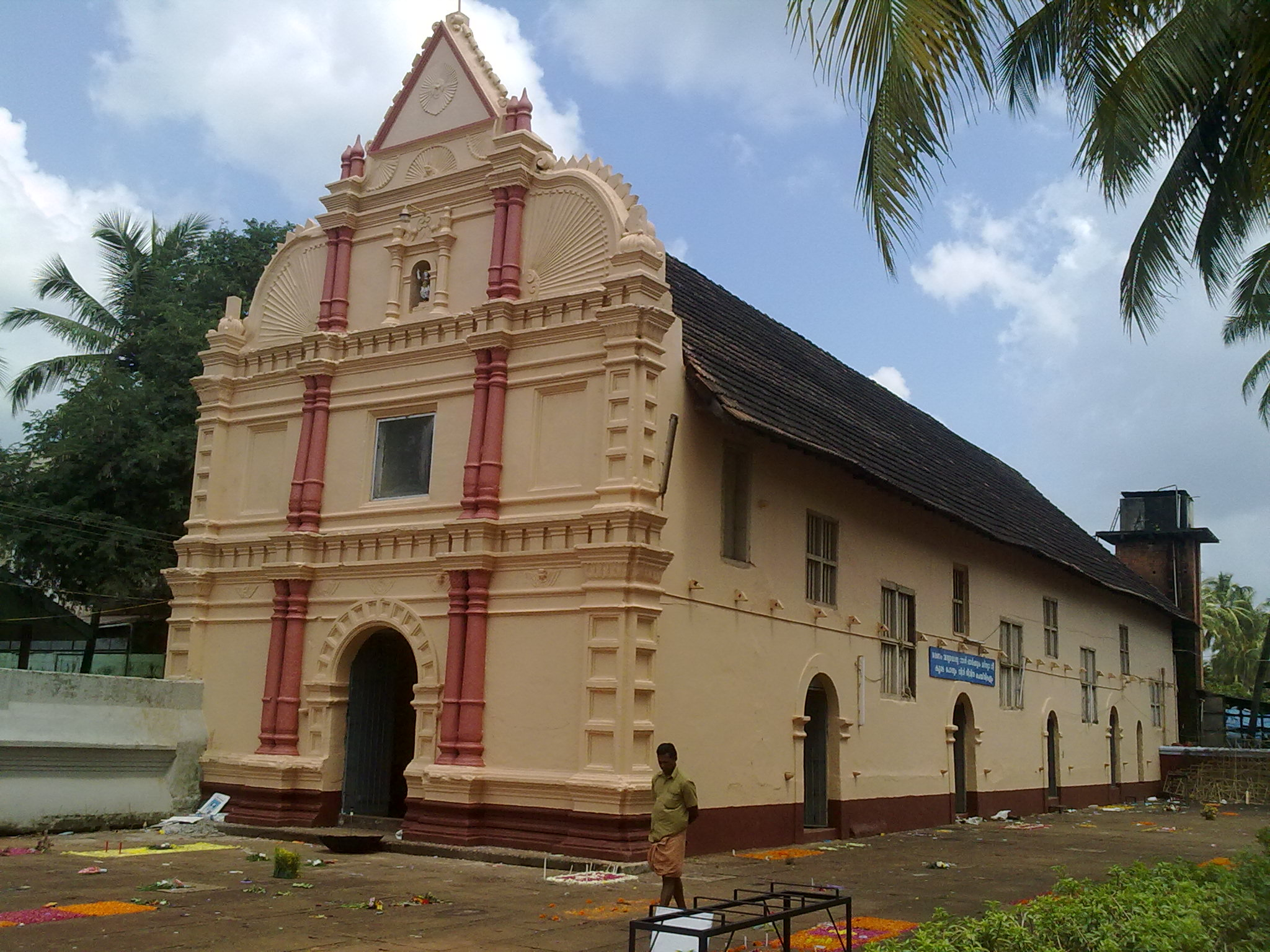
Church dedicated for the dead and cemetery in the compound of St Antony's Forane Church, Ollur

- Holy Angels English Medium High School, Ollur
- St. Raphael's Convent Girls High School, Ollur
- St.Mary's School, Chiyyaram, Ollur
- St.Joseph's High School Anakkallu, Ollur

== Catholic Organizations Ollur Forane Church ==
1. Catechism
2. Catechism P.T.A.
3. St. Vincent De Paul Society
4. Franciscan Sabha
5. Mathruvedi
6. Catholic Congress (A.K.C.C.)
7. Legion of Mary (Men)
8. Legion of Mary (Women)
9. Kerala Labour Movement ( K.L.M.)
10. K.C.Y.M (Men)
11. K.C.Y.M (Women)
12. Seniour C.L.C.
13. Juniour C.L.C.
14. Jesus Youth
15. Church Choir Group
16. Church Prayer Group
17. KCBC Madhya Virudha Samithi
18. ABA (Altar Boys Association)
19. Sevana Sangham
20. Yesunadham (Parish Bulletin)

=== Religious houses in the parish ===
- St. Mary's Convent
- Our Lady Fathima Matha Convent
- St. Vincent De Paul Convent
- F.C.C. Convent
- Galilee Retreat Centre
- Malabar Missionary Brothers Home
- John Haw Convent
- Sadhu Samrakshana Sangham
