= Feast of Saint Raphael, Ollur =

Annual festival in Ollur, Kerala, India

Feast of Saint Raphael
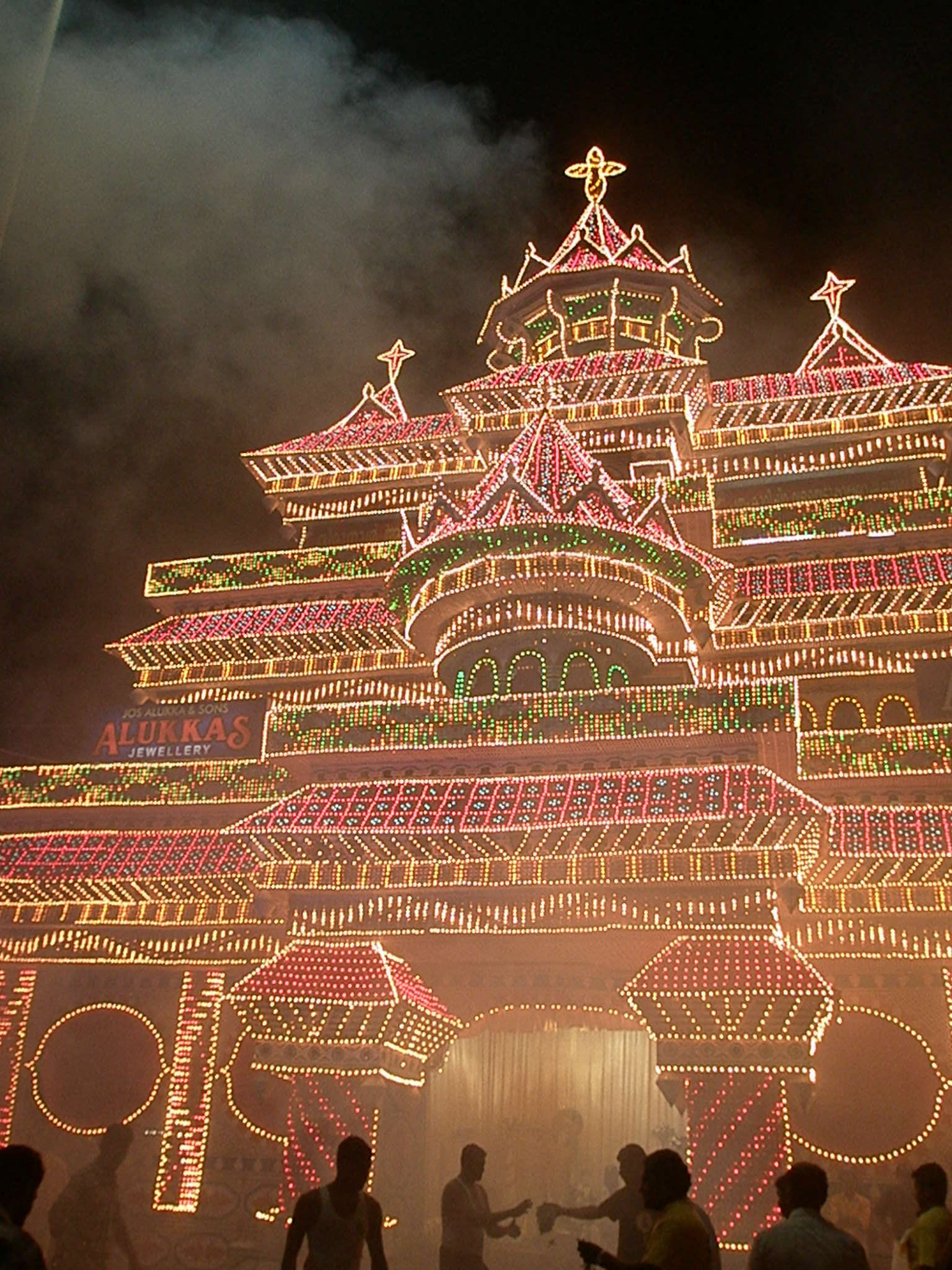
- Pandal in Ollur Junction made for the annual feast of Saint Raphael
- Genre: Church festivals
- Dates: 23, 24 October
- Locations: Ollur, Thrissur, Kerala
- Founded: 1718
- Attendance: 1,00,000 above
- Patron: Saint Antony
- Website: http://ollurshrine.org/

The Feast of Saint Raphael or Malakhayude Perunnal is an annual festival held in Ollur, near Thrissur, Kerala (India), since 1839. It draws thousands of pilgrims. The Ollur forane church, founded in 1718 and dedicated to St Anthony, also houses a shrine of Raphael the Archangel. It is one of the oldest churches built in 18th-century Kerala. The festival, held on 23 and 24 October of each year, is one of the most important Christian festivals in Kerala. The festival starts with the hoisting of the ceremonial flag on 15 October to mark the beginning of the celebrations in the church compound. It is one of half a dozen Christian festivals listed by Kerala Tourism as among the attractions of the state.
