= Ollur =

- suburb
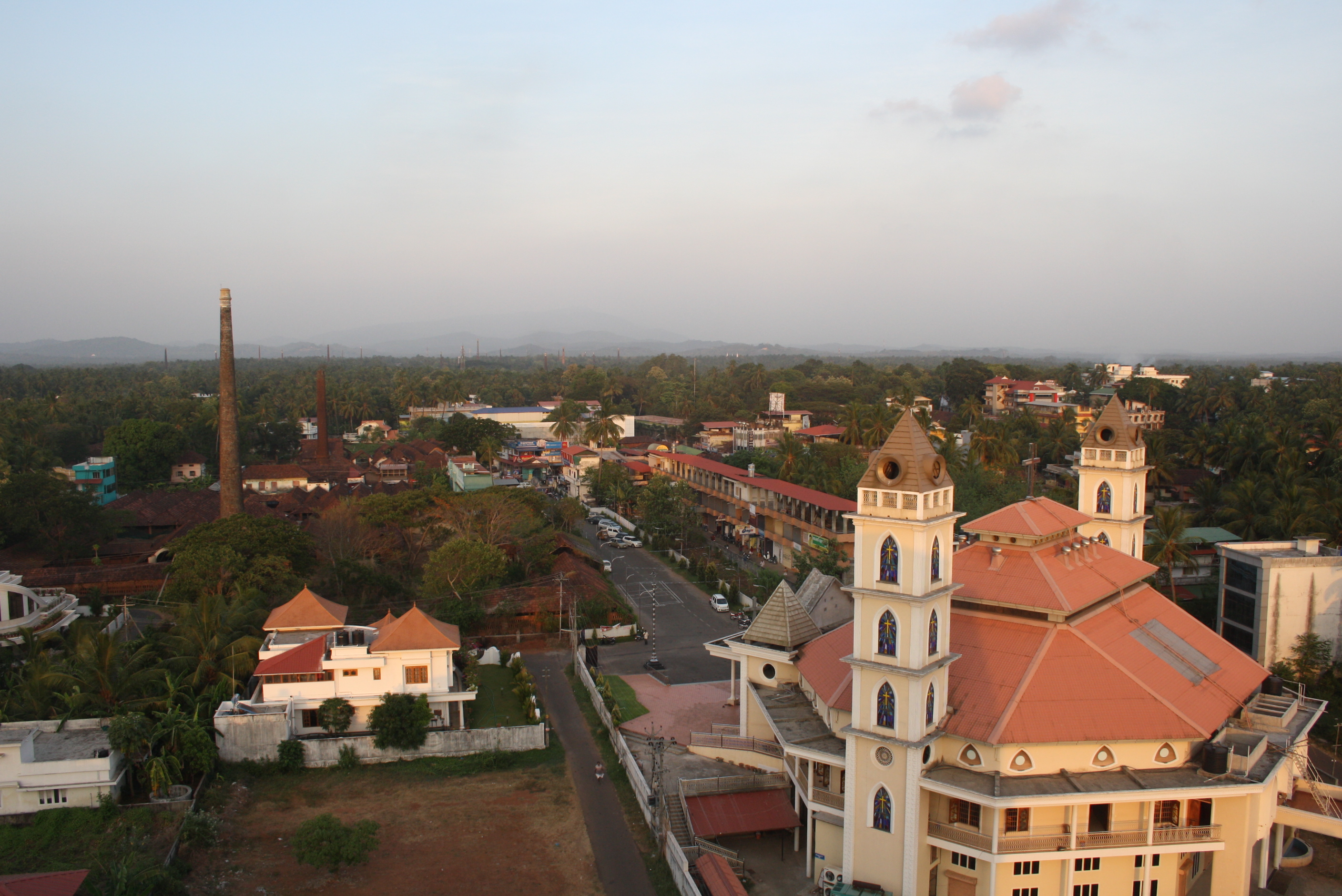
- Ollur town seen from a residential building

- Location in Kerala, India
- Coordinates: 10.46°N 76.23°E
- Country: India
- State: Kerala
- District: Thrissur

Government
  - Mayor: M K Varghese

Languages
  - Official: Malayalam, English
- Time zone: UTC+5:30 (IST)
- PIN: 680 306, 680 313
- Telephone code: 91 (0)487
- Vehicle registration: KL-08
- Website: www.corporationofthrissur.org

Ollur is a major suburban area and an old commercial town in the city of Thrissur of Kerala state, South India. It is about five kilometres (3.1 mi) away from Swaraj Round on old National Highway 47 (India) towards Kochi. From ancient time onwards, Ollur was a major business centre in Thrissur district. Now, this geographical area is part of Thrissur Municipal Corporation. It is situated between Kuriachira and Thalore on the National Highway. However, a specific identity for this geographical region is still there due to the urban setting of this region and its important religious institutions.

== History ==
The first recorded history of Ollur is the establishment of St. Anthony's Forane Church in 1718. Before India's independence, Ollur belonged to Kingdom of Cochin. Later it was with Travancore-Cochin State. In 1919, Ollur Panchayat was formed with villages of Ollur and Edakunny. The first Panchayat President was E. Ikkanda Warrier, who later became the prime minister of Cochin State. He was followed by Chev. Paulose Kallukkaren, Menachery Erinjery Lonappan Ouseph, Menachery Erinjery Dr. E. J. Anthony (twice) as Panchayat Presidents when India became Independent in 1947 and later the landlords only voter system gave place to one person one vote democratic system.

The Panchayat has an area of 14.92 km^{2} (5.76 sq mi). The Panchayat comprise mainly areas of Ancheri, Chiyyaram, Kuriachira, Chelakkoottukara, Kuttanellur, Padavaradu, Peruvamkulangara, Panamkuttichira, Edakkunni and Thaikkattussery. The first Panchayat election after India attained Independence was held in 1953. In 1997, the Government of Kerala decided to merge Ollur Panchayat to the Thrissur Municipal Corporation, which newly established on 1 October. Ollur Panchayat was completely merged with Thrissur Municipal Corporation.

== Education ==
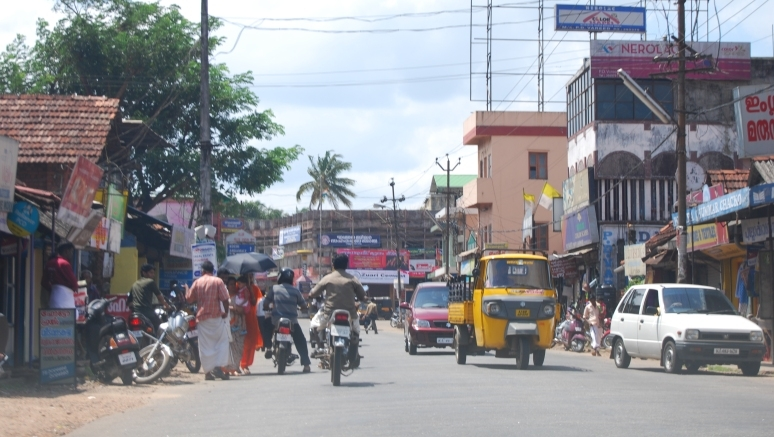
An evening seen from Ollur town

St. Anthony's Forane Church, Ollur was instrumental in beginning the first primary school in 1896.

=== Schools ===
- Vailoppilli Sreedhara Menon Memorial Government Vocational Higher Secondary School
- St. Raphael's Convent Girls High School
- Holy Angels English Medium High School
- St Mary's Convent Girls High School
- St Joseph's High School Anakkallu, Ollur
- Augustin Akkara Memo H.S, Kuttanallur, Ollur
- Government High School, Anchery, Ollur
- Government Upper Primary School, Ollur
- Government Upper Primary School, Thaikkttussery, Ollur
- Mission Home Lower Primary School, Mariyapuram, Ollur
- Asha Bhavan Deaf & Dumb School, Ollur
- Little Orchids Play School, Ollur

=== Colleges ===
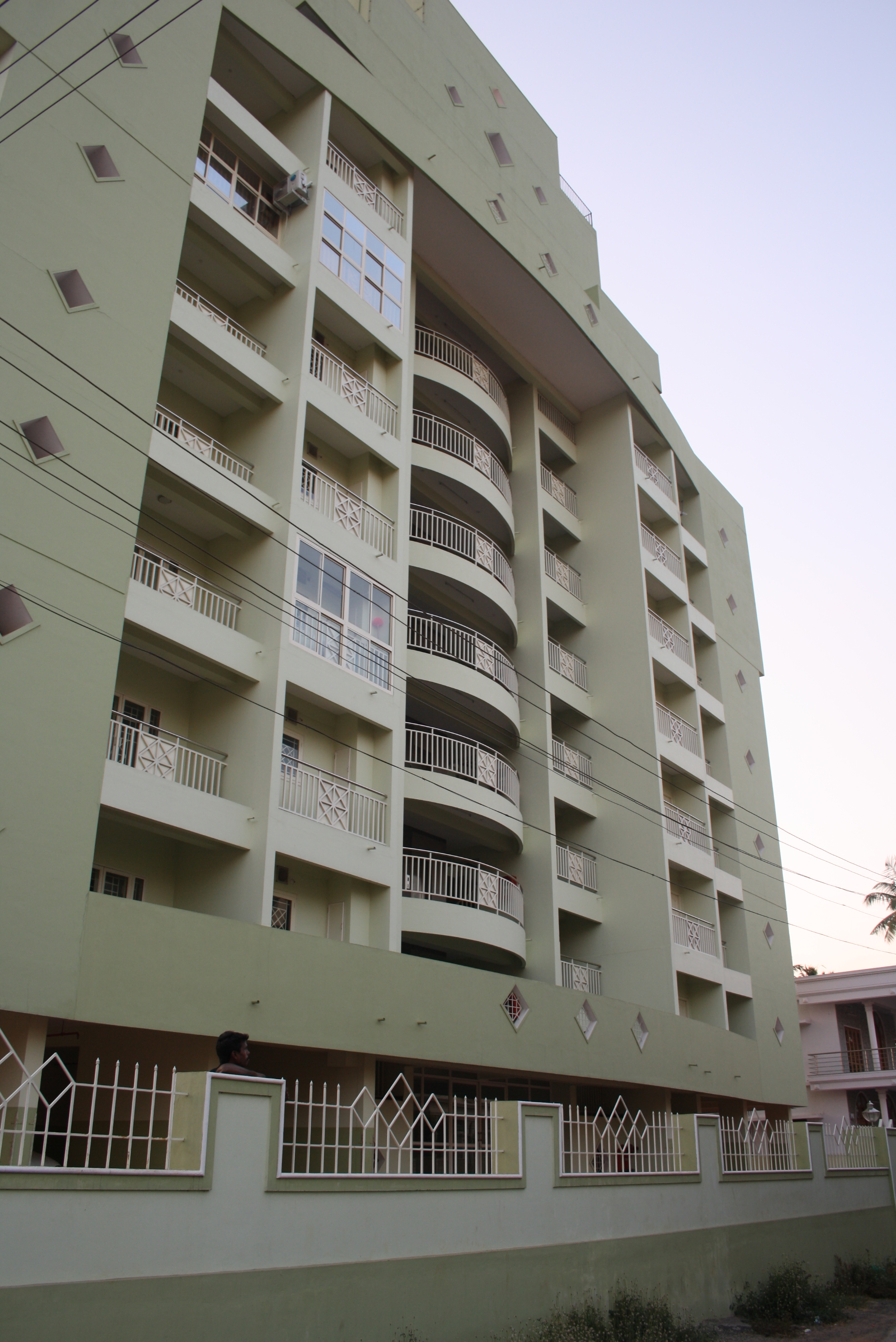
A multi-storey apartment building in Ollur town

- Vaidyaratnam Ayurveda College, Thaikkatussery, Ollur
- Sri C. Achutha Menon Government College, Kuttanellur, Ollur
- Government Arts and Science College, Ollur
- Government Bachelor of Education (B.Ed.) College, Ollur

== Hospitals ==
- St Vincent De Paul Hospital, Ollur
- Holy Family Hospital, Ollur
- E.S.I. Dispensary, Ollur
- Kanichayi Dental Clinic, Ollur
- Kattukkaran Hospital, Ollur
- Carewell Dental Clinic, Ollur
- Maria Dental Speciality Centre, Ollur
- Mandumbal dental clinic, Ollur

== Museums ==
- Vaidyaratnam Ayurveda Museum
- St. Euphrasia Museum

== Notable persons ==
- Mullanezhi
- Vani Viswanath
- Gopika
- Dain Davis
- Ouseppachan

== Civic administration ==
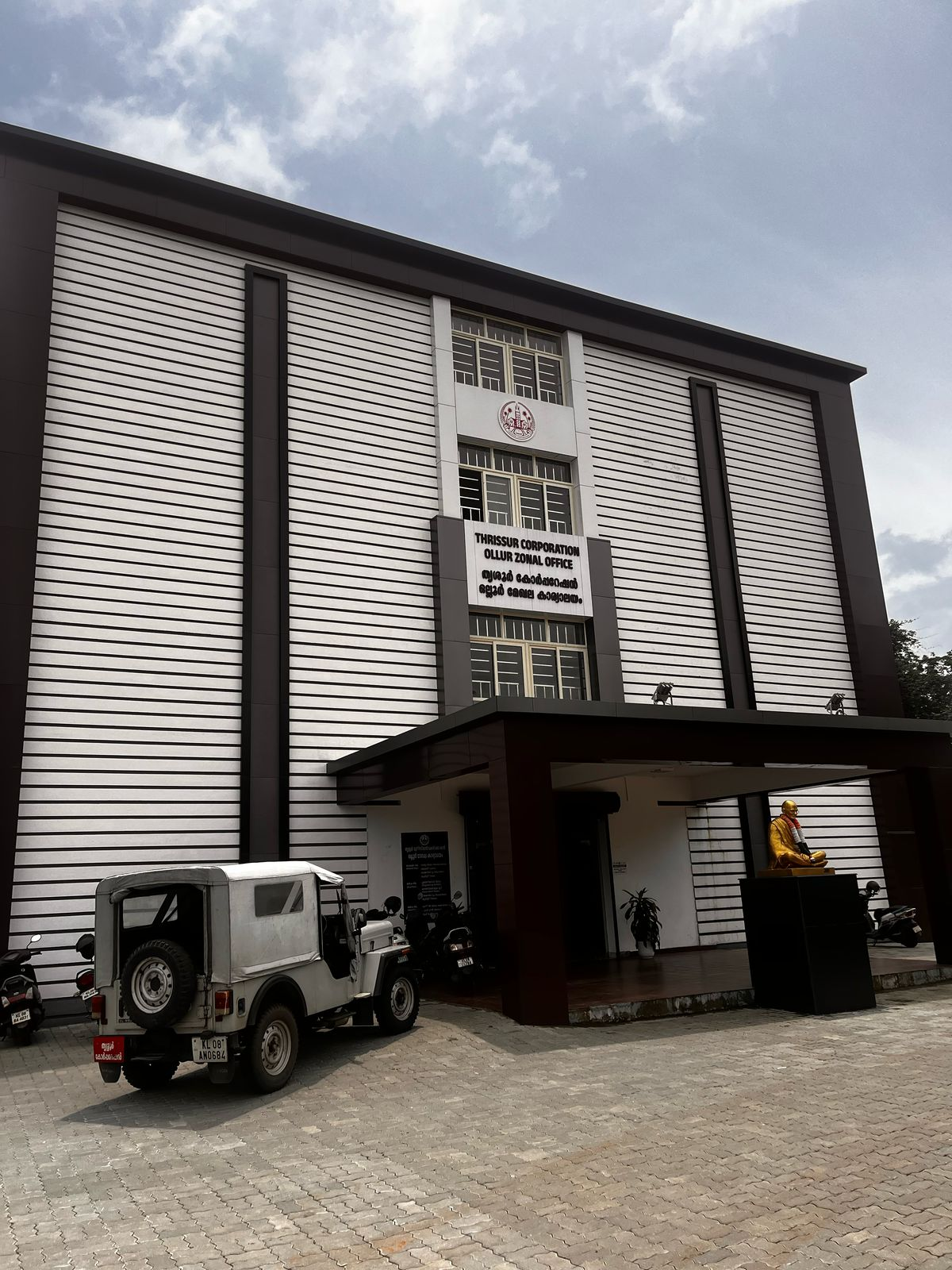
Thrissur Corporation Ollur Zonal office at Ollur

Ollur is administered by Thrissur Municipal Corporation.

=== Government offices ===
- Ollur Police Station (Assistant Commissioner of Police)
- Kerala State Electricity Board (Sub Division)
- Ollur Telephone Exchange
- Ollur Post Office
- ESI Dispensary

== Religion ==
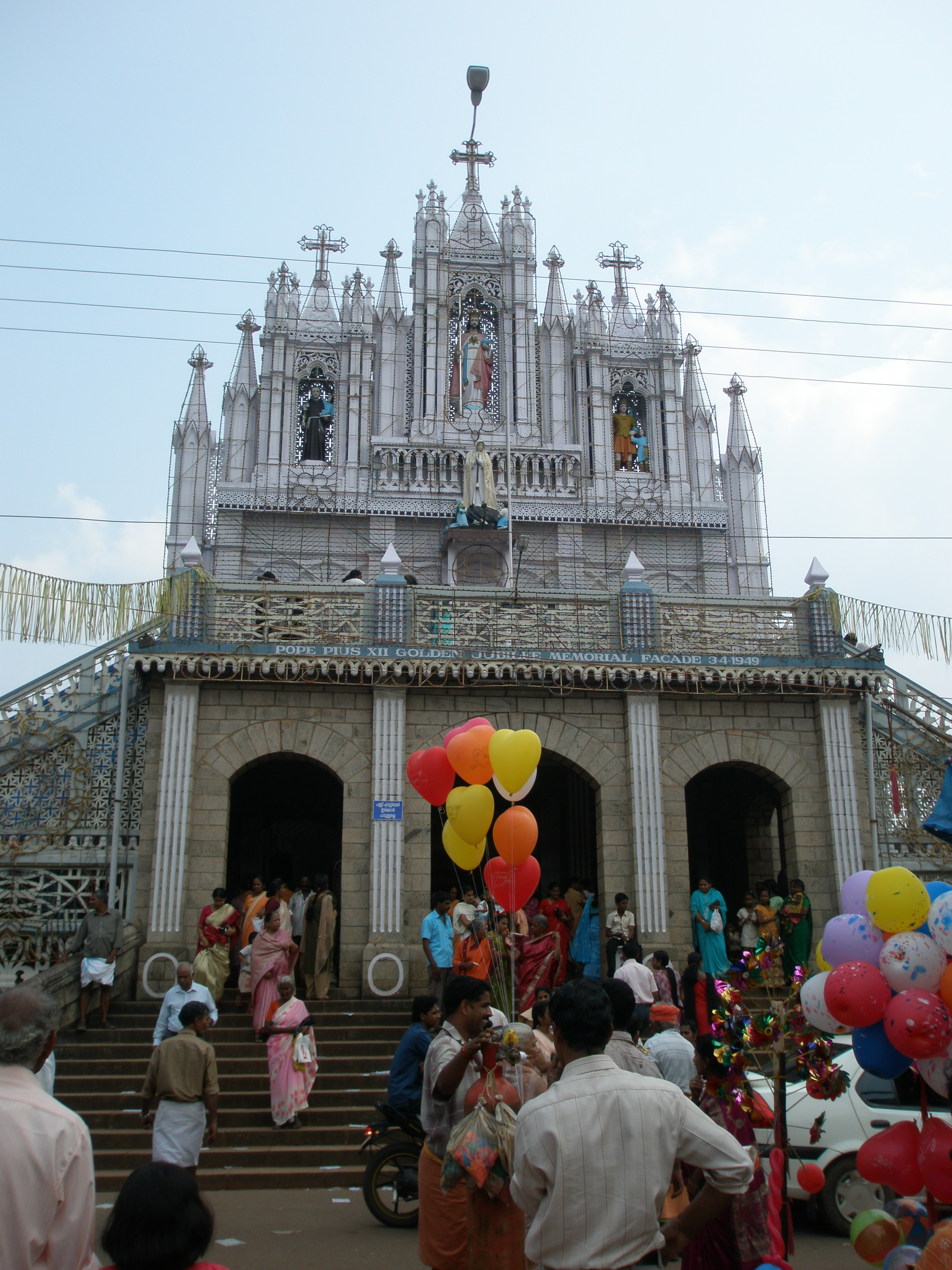
Facade of the St. Anthony's Forane Church in Ollur.

=== Edakkunni Sri Durga Bhagavathy Temple ===
Edakkunni Sri Durga Bhagavathy Temple is one of the 108 Durga temples believed to have been built by Parasurama. The female deity in Edakkunni Sri Durga Bhagavathy Temple is Vaishnava. The temple does not have upadevas inside the temple walls. The temple is an important participant in the Arattupuzha Pooram. Edakkunni Uthram Vilakku is the festival celebrated at Edakkunni Temple.

=== St. Anthony's Forane Church ===
St. Anthony's Forane Church is situated in Ollur. The church and parish played important roles in the beginning and growth of the Trichur Diocese. Of the four counsellors of Msgr. Dr. A. E. Medlycott the first vicar apostolic one was the vicar of the Ollur church, and another an Ollurian Fr. Marcellinos Menachery Erinjery who was also the first vicar of the cathedral church of Lourdes and the first native major seminary rector. Feast of Saint Raphael, Ollur, the Archangel, is the most important festival of Ollur church falling on 23 and 24 October of each year. People from distant places areas come here for the festival. The Ollur church, as all old places of worship in Kerala, is situated on top of a hillock, and there are numerous ring roads around this typically Kerala architecture style Devalaya, replete with woodwork, murals and colourful tiles.

=== Tomb of St. Euphrasia Eluvathingal ===
C.M.C. Euphrasia Eluvathingal's tomb and the convent is located in Ollur. There is a small museum inside the convent where her belongings are displayed.

== Business ==
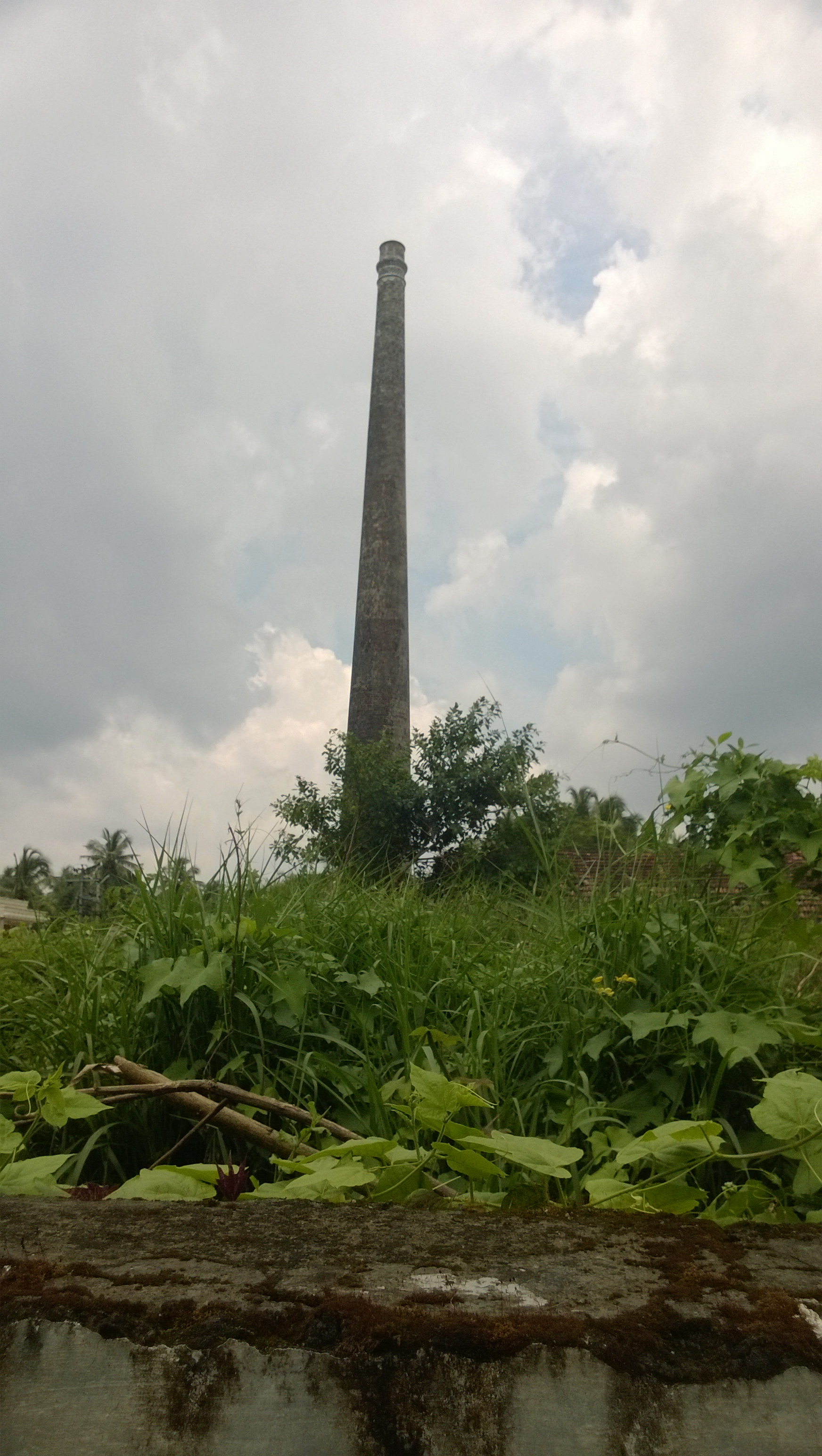
A Chimney of tile factory seen in Ollur town

Ollur lies in the central part of Kerala and has financial institutions, industries and a railway station around it. Vaidyaratnam Oushadhasala, an ayurvedic pharmaceutical company, is situated in Ollur. It is managed by Thaikkattusseri Eledathu Thaikkattu family, one among the Ashtavaidya families of Kerala. Oushadhi, another ayurvedic medicine manufacturing company is also situated in Ollur. It is directly controlled by Health and Family Welfare Department of Kerala Government. Catholic Syrian Bank has a staff training college in Ollur for its staff.

=== Tile factories ===
Ollur houses around 20 tile factories. These units cater mainly to Kerala, Tamil Nadu and Karnataka. In the pre-independence period, tiles were exported from Ollur railway station to different parts of the country by rail network.

=== Timber and wooden packing boxes ===
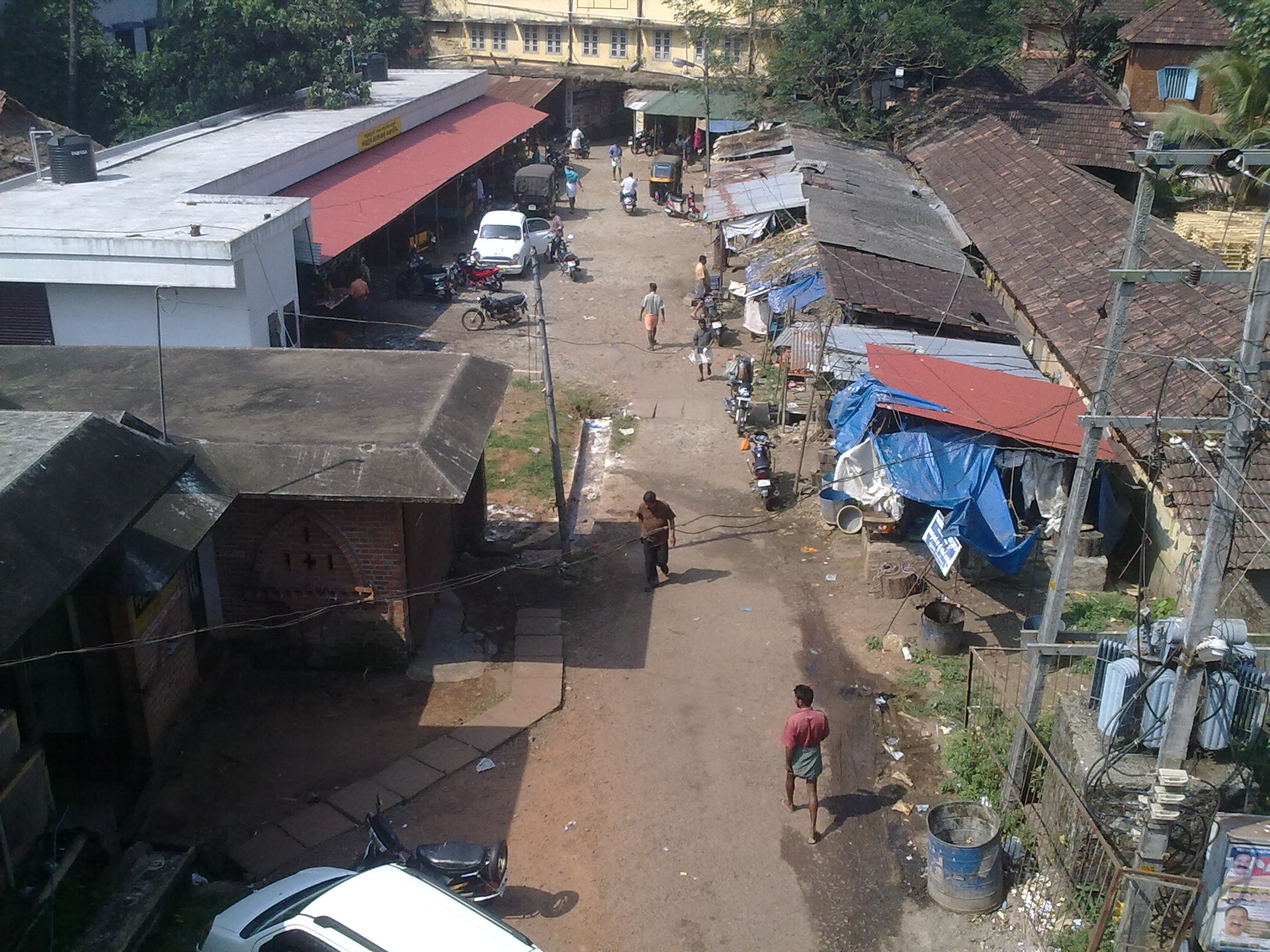
Ollur fish and vegetable market seen from municipal building

Ollur has timber and wooden packing boxes, around 300 units of wooden packing boxes units. Before India's independence, the British used to source sleepers and wooden platforms for railways from Ollur. During the First World War, wooden packing cases were built in Ollur for military purposes also. The business grew and now, the wooden packing cases of Ollur reach all parts of India and are even used for export. The boxes are made from rubber wood, which is taken on auction from different parts of Kerala. Another main business which goes with wooden packing case is the timber industry which is highly concentrated in Ollur. There are many saw mills also in Ollur. Nixon Industries is best manufactuer of wooden boxes and pallet in Ollur

=== Rolled gold ornaments ===
Ollur manufactures rolled gold ornaments sold in all over India. The rolled gold industry employee around 6,000 people and is 200 years old. The ornaments are made with designs imported from Kolkata, Mumbai, Chennai and other parts of India. Rolled gold jewelries are also exported to Middle East countries which have a large Indian diaspora. Rolled gold is a very thin sheet of gold that is laminated to a lesser metal (usually brass). The two layers of metal are heated under pressure to fuse them together. The sheet is them rolled into a very thin sheet and then used to make jewelry or other objects.

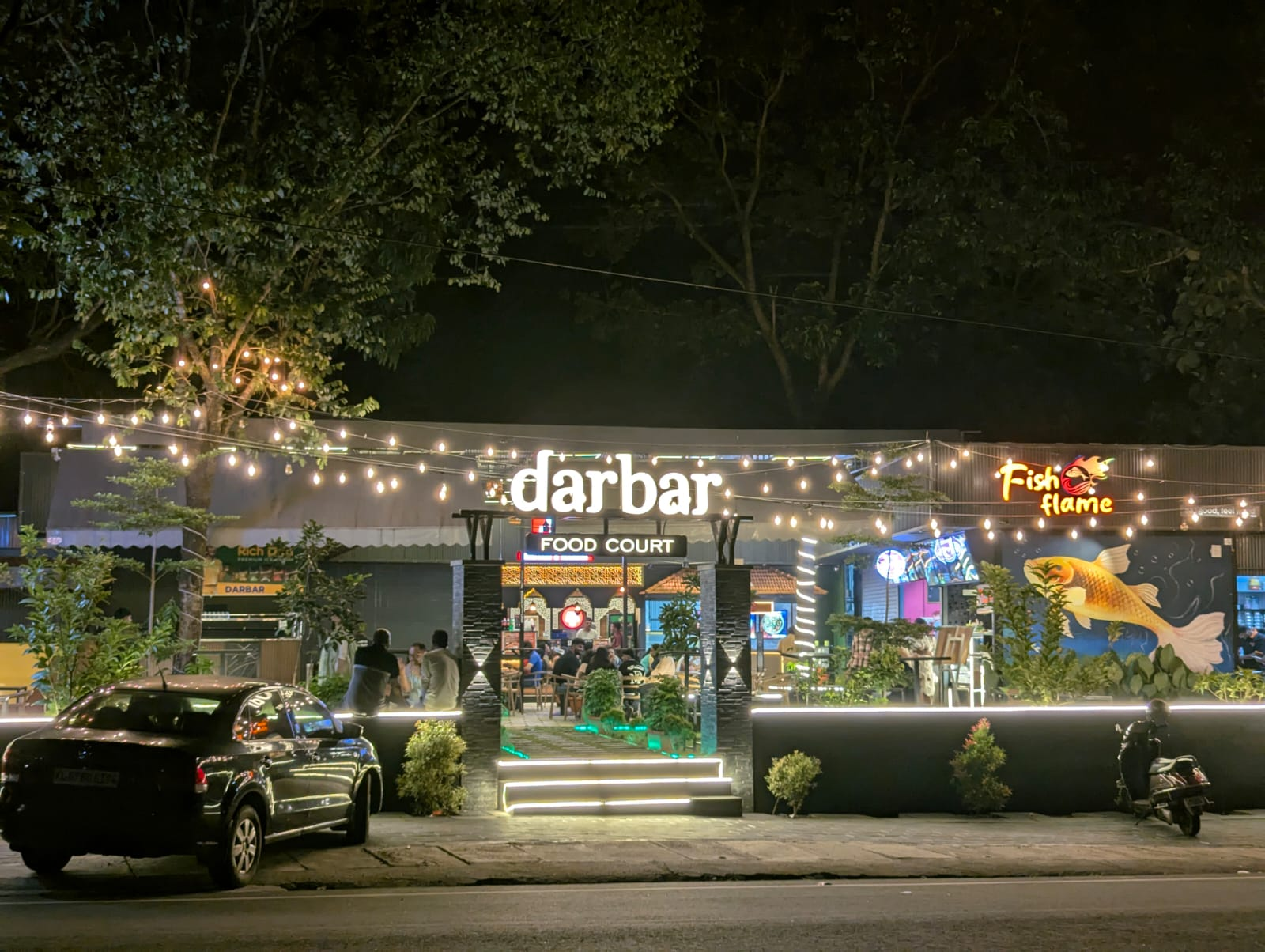
Food court in Ollur

==== Restaurants and bars ====
- Sree Bhavan Veg Hotel
- Sree Bhavan Bar
- Kallada Restaurant and Bar
- Massland Restaurant
- Salkara Restaurant and Bar
- Maheswari Veg Hotel
- Gift Restaurant
- Spicy restaurant
- Soofi Mandi

=== Banks ===
- ICICI Bank
- Canara Bank
- Bank of Baroda
- Federal Bank
- Dhanalakshmi Bank
- Catholic Syrian Bank
- South Indian Bank Ltd
- State Bank of India
- Axis Bank

== Transportation ==
Ollur is well connected to other cities in Kerala by both rail and road. It is located 50 km from the new Cochin International Airport and 85 km from the Kozhikode International Airport. Ollur lies on old NH 47. Both KSRTC and private bus services connect Ollur to Thrissur, Amballur, Kodakara, Cherpu, Irinjalakuda and Chalakkudy, Angamaly, Ernakulam, Kozhikode, Idukki, Kollam, Thiruvananthapuram and other major cities of Kerala. It is well-connected to nearby cities and towns like Kochi, Kozhikode and Palakkad. It is also connected to Chennai and other cities by private interstate buses. KSRTC SuperFast, A/C low floor, Limited Stop Fastpassenger, ordinary halts here and night time deluxe bus stops here.

=== Ollur railway station ===
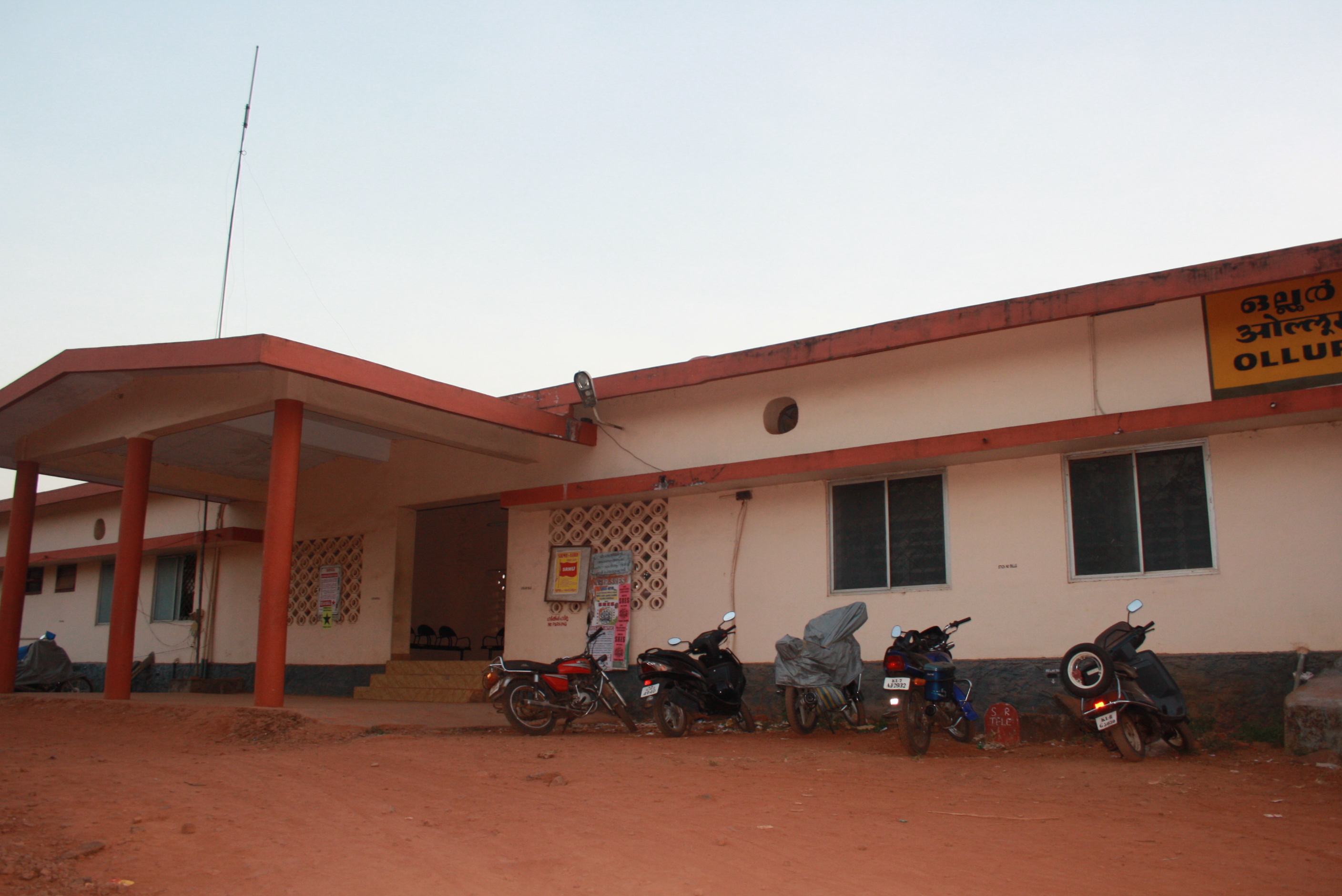
Front side of the Ollur railway station in Ollur town

Ollur railway station traces its history to 1902, when Shoranur–Cochin railway line was built during the rule of Sir Sri Rama Varma of Cochin Royal Family. Now, this railway line in the Central part of Kerala is considered one of the busiest railway route in Kerala and handles very high traffic intensity including passengers and goods. Ollur railway station falls between Thrissur railway station and Pudukad railway station in Shoranur–Cochin Harbour section electrified railway double line.

Only eight trains stop at Ollur railway station. They are Guruvayoor–Ernakulam Passenger, Ernakulam–Guruvayoor Passenger, Shoranur–Ernakulam Passenger and Ernakulam–Shoranur Passenger. Shoranur–Cochin Passenger runs between Cochin Harbour Terminus railway station and Shoranur Junction railway station. The train operates daily except on Sundays and covers a distance of 113 km. Second-class seating coaches are available. Guruvayoor–Ernakulam Passenger runs between Ernakulam Junction railway station and Guruvayur railway station.

== Politics ==
Ollur Assembly Constituency is part of Thrissur (Lok Sabha constituency). The present MLA of Ollur is Adv. K. Rajan.

== Controversies ==
According to an article in DNA India, a Kerala pastor Sanil K James, 35, employed as a pastor of the Salvation Army Church was accused of sexually assaulting a 12-year-old schoolgirl near his residence in April 2014. The pastor was convicted and sentenced to 40 years rigorous imprisonment for sexual abuse of a minor. This was done under the POCSO judgment by the Thrissur 1st Additional Sessions Court. The POCSO special prosecutor Pious Mathew was quoted as saying that another case related to sexual assault on an under-age SC/ST girl has been registered against the same pastor and that trial was yet to commence.

The 2015 film Spotlight, which depicted the exposé of the Catholic Church sexual abuse cases by The Boston Globe in 2002, mentioned Ollur as one of the places where abuses have taken place under the Church.
