= Jerusalem Retreat Center =

Catholic retreat in India

Coordinates: 10.4550°N 76.2599°E

- Abbreviation: JRC
- Formation: 1995 (31 years ago)
- Type: Catholic
- Headquarters: Thalore Bypass Road, Pulakkattukara, Thrissur
- Provincial: Paul Achandy
- Key people: Paulson Paliekkara
- Website: www.jerusalemcentre.org

Jerusalem Retreat Center is a Catholic charismatic renewal centre in Thalore, Thrissur city. The centre is managed by the Carmelites of Mary Immaculate, Thrissur. The centre comes under Syro-Malabar Catholic Archdiocese of Thrissur.

Jerusalem retreat centre is a spiritual pilgrim centre in India. Retreats are conducted in Malayalam, Tamil, and English every month round the year. This centre is promoted and owned by the Carmelites of Mary Immaculate(CMI) congregation. The centre has been propagating the Word of God, since its formation in 1992. People come for spiritual rejuvenation and liberation from the evils, bondage of alcohol and drug addiction. Sick and ailing people are also healed. After long years of issue-less married life, barren women are bearing fruit of their ardent prayer. The presence of Jesus Christ is felt. The sick were healed, sinner were forgiven, the bondages were broken, The good news of salvation has instilled a new hope in the hearts of people irrespective of caste and religion.

Jerusalem Campus: Jerusalem is located on the sides of National Highway-47 Mannuthy Thalore by Pass junction, Thrissur district Kerala, India.

How to reach Jerusalem: Jerusalem is 10 km away from Thrissur town, which is also the district headquarters. Every train stops at Thrissur railway station. The pilgrim traveling by road from south Kerala, come a head-on NH-47 to Thalore bye-pass junction. The nearest airport KOCHI International Airport(Nedumaserry) is one hour drive to the centre. Trivandrum, Kovai(Coimbatore), Trichy, Chennai are the other nearby airports. The centre has made travel arrangement from railway station and airport.
