= Anchery =

- village
- Location in Kerala, India Anchery (India)
- Coordinates: 09°32′26.6″N 76°35′35.4″E
- Country: India
- State: Kerala
- District: Kottayam

Languages
  - Official: Malayalam, English
- Time zone: UTC+5:30 (IST)
- Vehicle registration: KL-

Anchery is a village that is a part of Puthuppally Panchayat in the Kottayam district of Kerala, South India.

== Geography ==
Anchery is situated 10 kilometres away from Kottayam Railway Station, on the Kottayam-Kozhencherry state highway (SH4) of Kerala State

== Name ==
As per the government records, this region is known as Pariyaram. The name Anchery is known to this region believed that Anchery Puthiyakavu Devi Temple might have coined the name Anchery. The Anchery name is originated from the Malayalam word Anchu (five), and Cheri (division or area of land).

== Religion ==
The majority of the people who live here are following Christianity or Hinduism.

== Places of worship ==
There is a very famous Hindu temple known as Anchery Puthiya Kavu Devi Temple. This temple holds a festival known as Meenabharanni Maholsavam (Kumbakudam).

St. Peter's Orthodox Syrian Church (Anchery pally) was the first historical church in Anchery built by five forefathers, who all had a common name called "Itty". The church was also known as "Anchue Itty Palli" and is now known as the St. Peter's Orthodox Syrian Church. The church parish day is the lands festival (perunall) where everyone comes without any grade.

Other churches in Anchery are the Anchery Christos Marthoma church, the St. Mary's Malankara Catholic church, the St. John's CSI Church and the Carmel India Pentecostal Church.

== Other landmarks ==
Anchery has a State Bank of India (Pariyaram) Branch located in Narimattom Kavala. The Pariyaram Government upper primary School (Anchery school) is the only educational institution in Anchery. The school had well educated people who live in India and abroad.

Anchery also has a post office named Pariyaram, and an ayurvedic clinic located in Kathayil Paalam. There is also a government veterinary hospital which has had many years of successful service towards domestic animals.

Anchery's public library is located in Narimattam Kavala. It has a history of around 60 years. YMCA Pariyaram branch is also situated at Narimattam Kavala.

== Transportation ==
Anchery is well connected by the road. The Kerala State Highway SH4 travels through Anchery. The public transport system is passing through Anchery.

== Agriculture ==
Rubber, tapioca (yucca), banana, plantain, coconut, black pepper and many other tropical agricultural products are major sources of revenue in Anchery.
