= Thaikkattussery =

Residential area in Thrissur, India

Thaikkattussery is a residential area situated in the City of Thrissur in Kerala state of India. Thaikkattussery is Ward 30 of Thrissur Municipal Corporation.

== See also ==
- Thrissur
- Thrissur District
