= Ashtavaidya =

An Ashtavaidya is a practitioner of the Ayurveda system of medicine belonging to a group of families of Namboothiri in the Indian state of Kerala. Among the Ayurvedic healers of Kerala, the Ashtavaidyas are the physicians who are masters of the eight branches of Ayurveda mentioned in classical texts. It was this expertise in the eight branches (ashtangas in sanskrit) that earned them the epithet of ashtavaidya. These branches are dealt with in detail in the treatise Ashtānga Hridayam one of the primary texts of Ayurveda. The eight branches of Ayurveda are Kaya (general medicine mainly dealing with digestive disorders), Bala (pediatrics including obstetrics), Graha (psychological disorders due to possession by evil spirits), Urdhvanga (diseases of the head (eyes, ears, nose, throat and teeth)), Shalya (surgery and treatment for external injuries), Damshtra (toxicology (treatment for poisoning, snake and insect bites), Jara (geriatrics and rejuvenation) and Vrisha (aphrodisiacs and treatment for sterility).

Initially there were eighteen families that were designated as families of Ashtavaidyas. Many of these families became extinct or got merged with other families and currently there are only eight surviving families considered as families of ashtavaidyas. These families are

1. Aalathiyoor Nambi,
2. Elayidath Thaikkatt Mooss,
3. Thrissur Thaikkattu Mooss (Pazhanellippurath Thaikkatt Mooss),
4. Kuttancherry Mooss,
5. Vayaskara Mooss,
6. Chirattamon Mooss,
7. Velluttu Mooss and
8. Pulamanthol Mooss.

Only four of these eight families are practising Ayurveda now. They are Thrissur Thaikkattu (Pazhanellippurathu Thaikkattu Moss), Elayidath Thaikkattu Moss, Chirattamann Moss and Pulamantol Moss.

== Contributions to literature on Ayurveda ==
The Ashtavaidyas have made several significant contributions to the literature on Ayurveda. These include commentaries on the Ashtangahrdayam and compendiums in Malayalam such as Alattur Manipravalam, Cikitsamanjari, Sahasrayogam and Sindhuramanjari. A member of the Vayaskara Mooss family has published ancient texts and his own original works. Vaidyamadham Cheriya Narayan Namboodiri (1932–2013) has written books and over a hundred newspaper articles to inform the public about Ayurveda.

== The training of Ashtavaidyas ==
In the pre-modern times the Ashtavaidyas were trained in the traditional Gurukula system. This involved a long period of intense study and apprenticeship under accomplished masters. Knowledge of Sanskrit was considered essential to understand and analyse the meanings in the ancient medical texts. Students also mastered Sanskrit works on Tarka (the rules of reasoning and argument), and the traditional philosophies of Nyaya, Vaisheshika and Samkhya. The Ayurvedic studies of Ashtavaidyas began with the study of Ashtangahrdayam; this involved memorizing all 7120 verses of the Ashtangahrdayam. During the period of apprenticeship under a guru, student physicians wrote out the prescription for patients. The number of years of education was said to be "five years of textual study, five years of learning about medicinal plants in the forest, and five years of apprenticeship at home"; in practice the period of study would be much longer.
