= Athirampuzha =

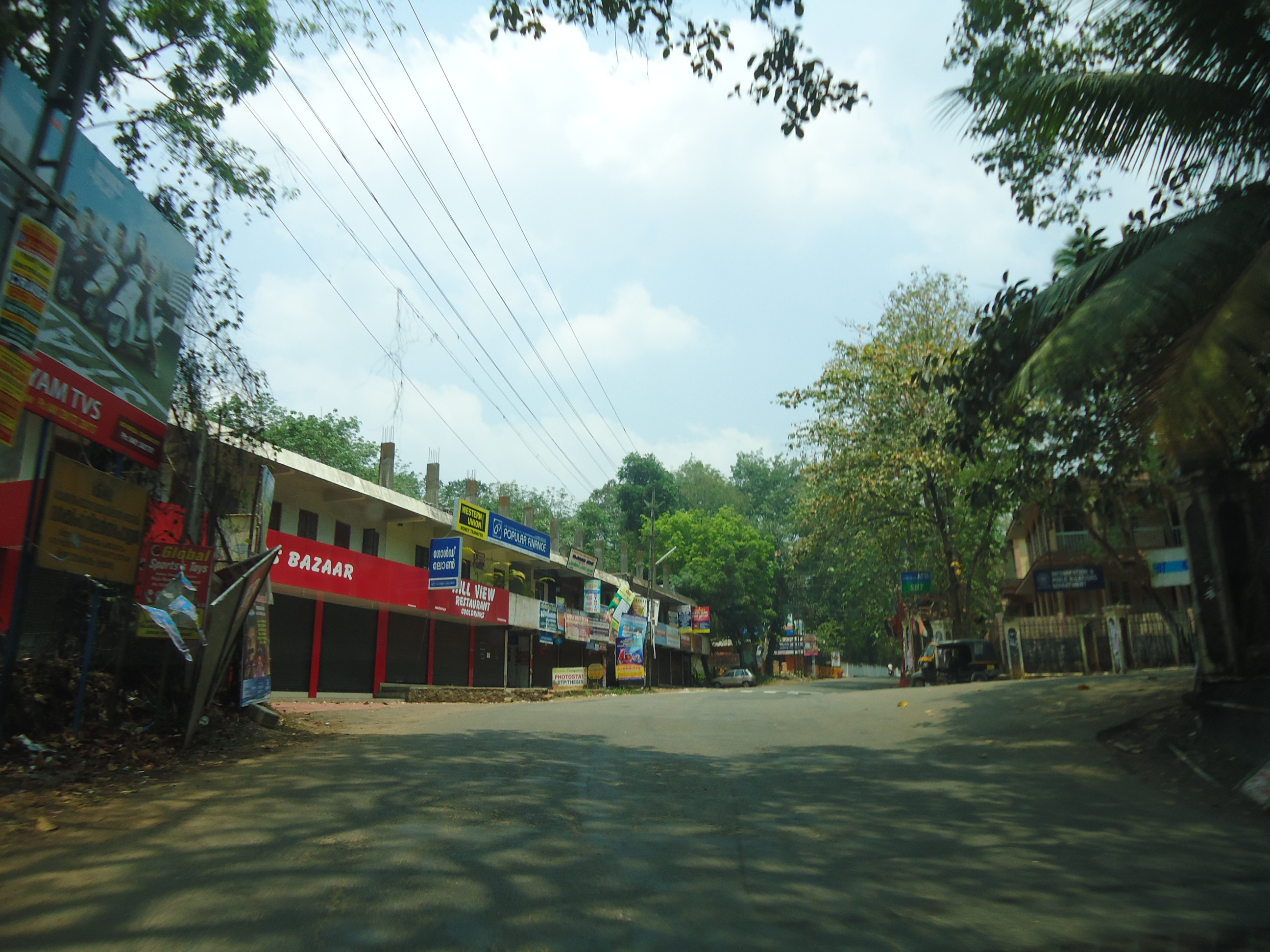
- University junction, Athirampuzha
- Interactive map of Athirampuzha
- Coordinates: 9.6594900°N 76.5266600°E
- Country: India
- State: Kerala
- District: Kottayam

Population (2011)
  - Total: 40,438

Languages
  - Official: Malayalam, English
- Time zone: UTC+5:30 (IST)
- Vehicle registration: KL-05
- Nearest city: Kottayam

Athirampuzha is a town in the Kottayam district of the Kerala state of India. It is famous as the Mahatma Gandhi University is situated here. Athirampuzha is situated 10 km north of Kottayam town, 3 km from Ettumanoor and from Main Central Road S.H.1 of Kerala. St. Mary's Forane Church (Syro malabar Catholic) is well known for the feast of St. Sebastian every year on Jan. 24 and 25. Along with the church, there is a school with classes up to 12th standard for girls and boys separately - St. Aloysius school for boys and St. Mary's School for girls.

== History ==
It is believed that Athirampuzha was a well-established developed village and settlements were there even in 1200 AD. The famous traveler Marco Polo's travel descriptions, "The description of the world", have some references about അതിരമ്പുഴ. While he was traveling through Kerala he reached a port town called 'athiramkari'. The description of this place closely matches to അതിരമ്പുഴ. According to Marco Polo Athiramkari was a trade center famous for Pottery, Cattle's, vegetable market (ചന്ത) (still exists) and clothes. 'Chantha Kulam (ചന്തകുളം)' was the center of trade where boats could dock. It is believed that mappilas (Christians) and Hindus (nairs) were settled in Athirampuzha during that period. Athirampuzha was now established by the Kollappallil - Mathirampuzha family and Thekkedathu family (at Velamkulam), which is present yet Athirampuzha remained as a famous port town till the mid-1900s. Later more roads were developed which reduced the importance of backwater trade routes. The old boat shed (renovated later) still exists near the Chantha kulam.

The nearest rail head is Ettumanoor Railway Station just 1.5 km from Athirampuzha.

Luka Mathai Plathottam (1888–1968) introduced homeopathy to Athirampuzha. He published many books including Varthamanappusthakam in 1936. (This entitles as the first travelogue in any Indian language).Justice K.K. Mathew Kuttyil, his youngest son Justice K.M Joseph Kuttiyil, Post Master General of India and First Malayalee Postal board member C J Mathew Chackalackal, Deepika Daily Chief Editor K.M. Joseph Karivelil, K.M Joseph Kalarickal formal Central Fisheries commissioner, Dr. TJ Sebastian are some of the prominent people from Athirampuzha.

== Economy ==
Athirampuzha is one of the oldest trading centers in Travancore. The place is believed to have trade relations with Middle East from centuries ago. Mahatma Gandhi University is located in Athirampuzha. Kuriakose Elias College, Mannanam, Amalagiri B.K. College, Ettumanoor I.T.I., SNV L.P School Mannanam, St. Aloysious School, St. Marys School, St. Ephrems Higher Secondary School Mannanam, K.E. School Mannanam, St. Gregorious U.P.School Mannarkunnu, Government L.P. School Sreekandamangalam, etc. are located in Athirampuzha Panchayat.

== Religion ==
Christianity is the predominant religion in the Athirampuzha region, followed by Hinduism and Islam. The St. Mary's Forane Church at Athirampuzha is one of the oldest in Kerala. The Venmanatoor Sri Krishna Swami Temple (തൃക്കേൽ) is situated in Athirampuzha. The famous Vedhagiri hill is a Hindu pilgrim center located in the ward 1 of Athirampuzha panchayath. It is believed that the pandavas (Mahābhārata) visited the vyasa during their exile life. Remnants of the monastery are seen on the top of a small hill called Vedhagirimala. Hindus often visit the place and pray for their forefathers at the temple (Sri Dharma Shastha Kshethram) and have a snanam{Sanskrit} (holy bath) at the pond near the temple. Charis Bhavan, a well-known MSFS charismatic retreat center also located in Athirampuzha. The Ettumanoor Mahadevar Temple is situated near Athirampuzha. Also, there are multiple small Hindu temples and mosques in different parts of Athirampuzha.

== St. Mary's Forane Church ==
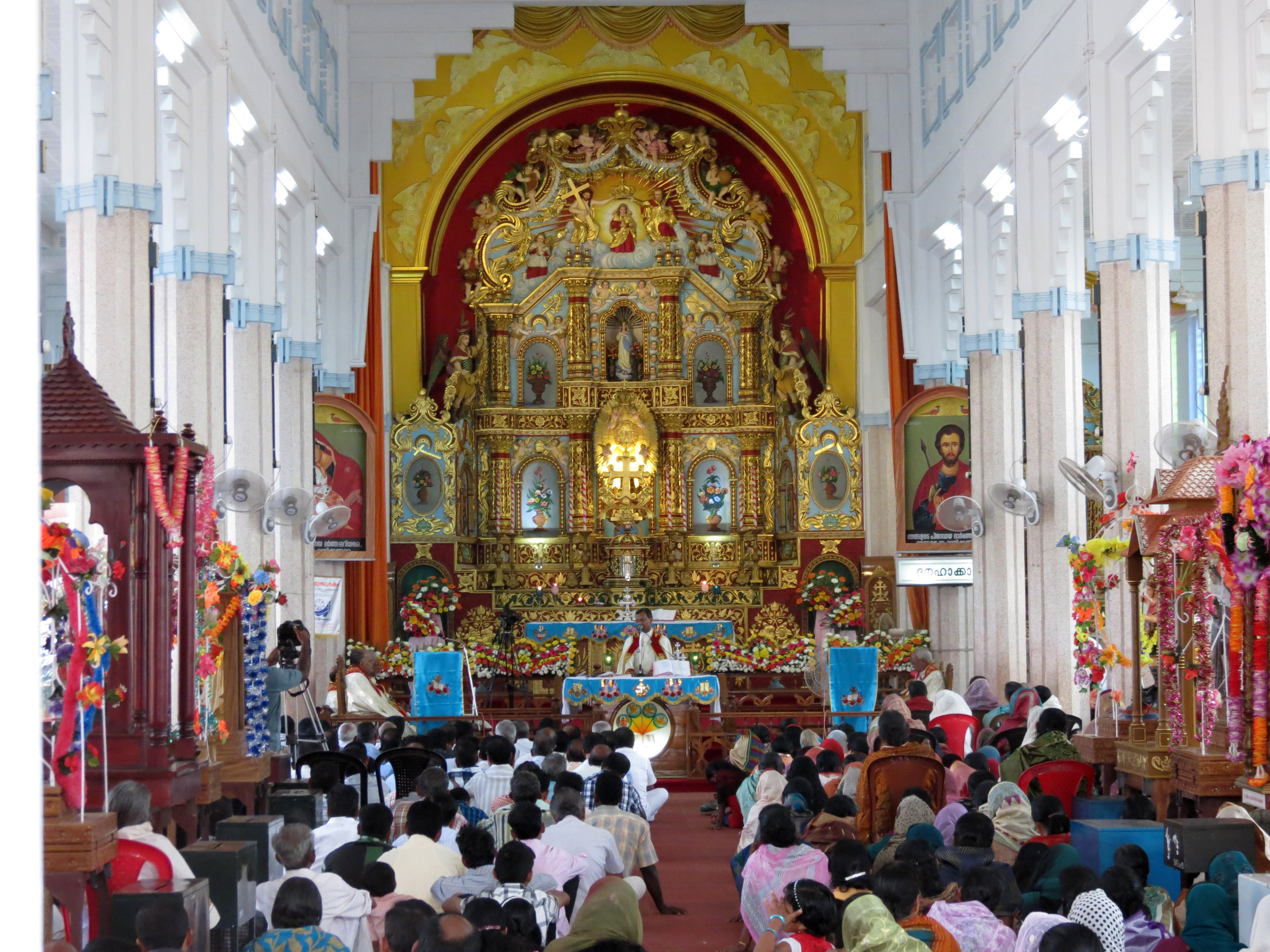
St. Mary's Forane Church of Athirampuzha, altar

The Forane Church of Athirampuzha, built in 835 AD, hosts an annual pilgrimage event related to St.Sebastian.

== Location ==
Ettumanoor Rail way Station and Industrial Estate is really located in Athirampuzha. Ettumanoor, Kumaranalloor, Arpookara, Kudamaloor, Mudiyoorkara, Aymanam, Kumarakom, Kaipuzha, Neendoor, Onamthuruth, Kurumulloor, Kanakkary, Pattithanam are the neighbouring places of Athirampuzha. Government Medical College, Kottayam, Caritas Hospital, Matha Hospital in Thellakom are situated very near to Athirampuzha. Athirampuzha is having many post offices like Amalagiri, Priyadarshini Hills, Sreekandamangalam, Kottackupuram etc.

== Transportation ==
Athirampuzha was once a major inland waterway terminal town. Freight boats from Alappuzha called at Athirampuzha. From Athirampuzha bullock carts transported the goods to Pala and beyond. Passenger ferry services were available from Athirampuzha to Alappuzha and Muhamma. In the 1960s after road transportation gained prominence, Ettumanoor by virtue of its location gained popularity and the slow decline of Athirampuzha started. The passenger ferry services were curtailed till Mannanam after a newly constructed bridge over the navigable canal sank. The service to Mannanam is now curtailed till Maniaparambu. Newly declared National Waterway 9 starts from Athirampuzha Market and extends till Alappuzha via Kottayam. This waterway passes through Maniaparambu; from where passenger ferry services are operated to Muhamma, Kannankara and Cheepunkal. Major express trains like Venad Express and Parasuram Express stop at Ettumanur railway station. During the festive season, some long-distance trains have a temporary halt here.
