= George Kurian (politician) =

Indian politician (born 1960)

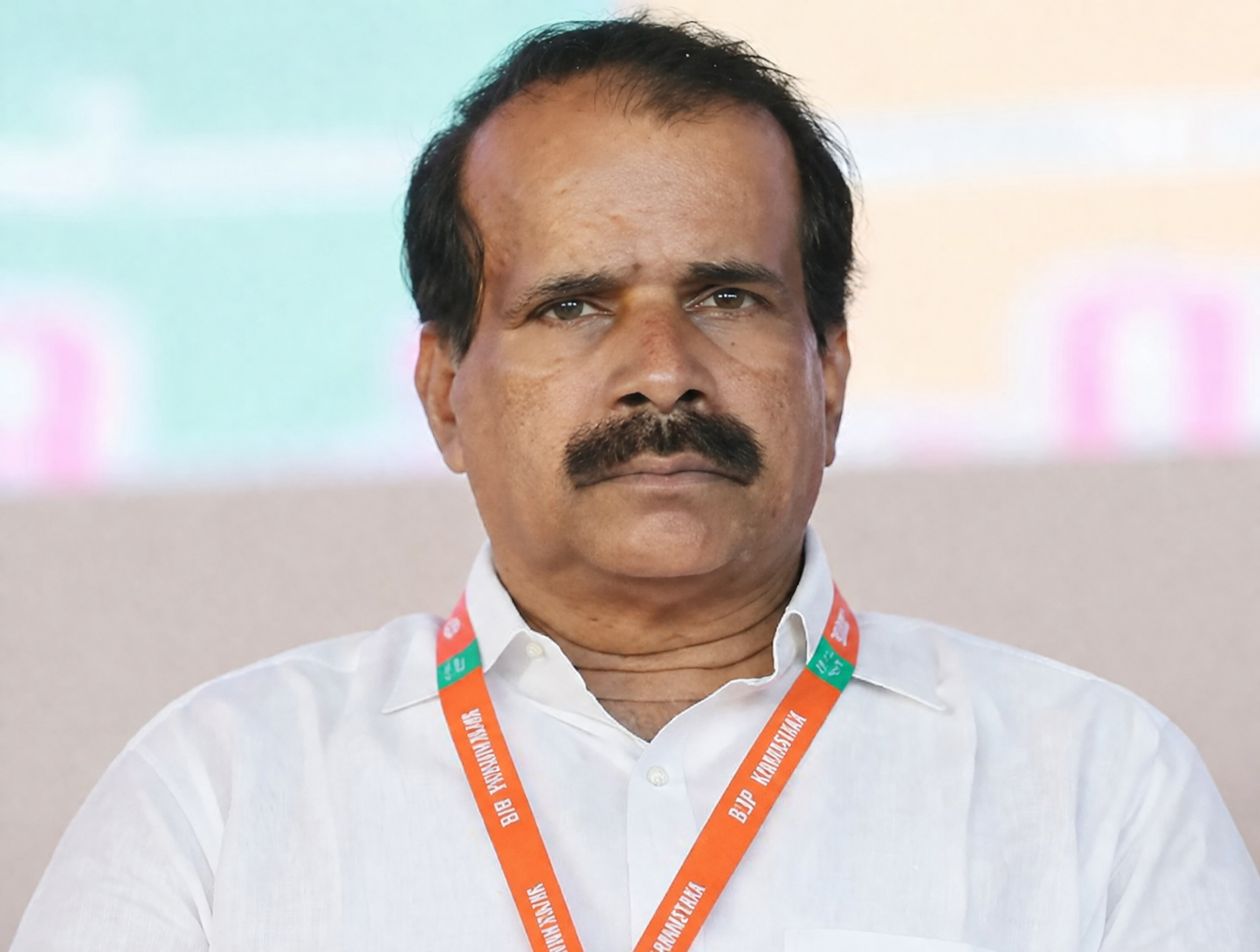

Union Minister of State for Fisheries, Animal Husbandry and Dairying
- In office 10 June 2024 – 23 June 2026
- Minister: Rajiv Ranjan Singh
- Preceded by: L. Murugan

Union Minister of State for Minority Affairs
- In office 10 June 2024 – 23 June 2026
- Minister: Kiren Rijiju
- Preceded by: John Barla

Member of Parliament, Rajya Sabha
- In office 28 August 2024 – 21 June 2026
- Preceded by: Jyotiraditya Scindia
- Constituency: Madhya Pradesh

Personal details
- Born: 20 September 1960 (age 65) Kurumulloor, Kerala, India
- Party: Bharatiya Janata Party
- Spouse: Lt. Col. O. T. Annamma (m. 1994)
- Children: 2
- Education: Bachelor of Science; Master of Arts; Bachelor of Laws
- Occupation: Politician; lawyer

George Kurian (born 20 September 1960) is an Indian politician and lawyer from Kerala, who served as the Minister of State for Fisheries, Animal Husbandry and Dairying and Minority Affairs in the third Modi ministry. He is a long-standing member of the Bharatiya Janata Party (BJP) who joined the party ever since its formation in 1980. He was a lawyer in the Supreme Court of India. He was a member of Rajya Sabha. He also contested in Kerala state assembly elections many times.

Previously, he has served as the vice-chairman of National Commission for Minorities and as Officer on Special Duty (OSD) to the then Minister of State for Railways, O. Rajagopal.

== Early life ==
Kurian was born at Ettumanoor in the Kottayam district of Kerala. After earning a B.Sc. from the K.E. College, Mannanam, he completed his M.A. at the Government College, Kottayam. He is also a law graduate from School of Indian Legal Thought and has practiced in Supreme Court.

== Political career ==
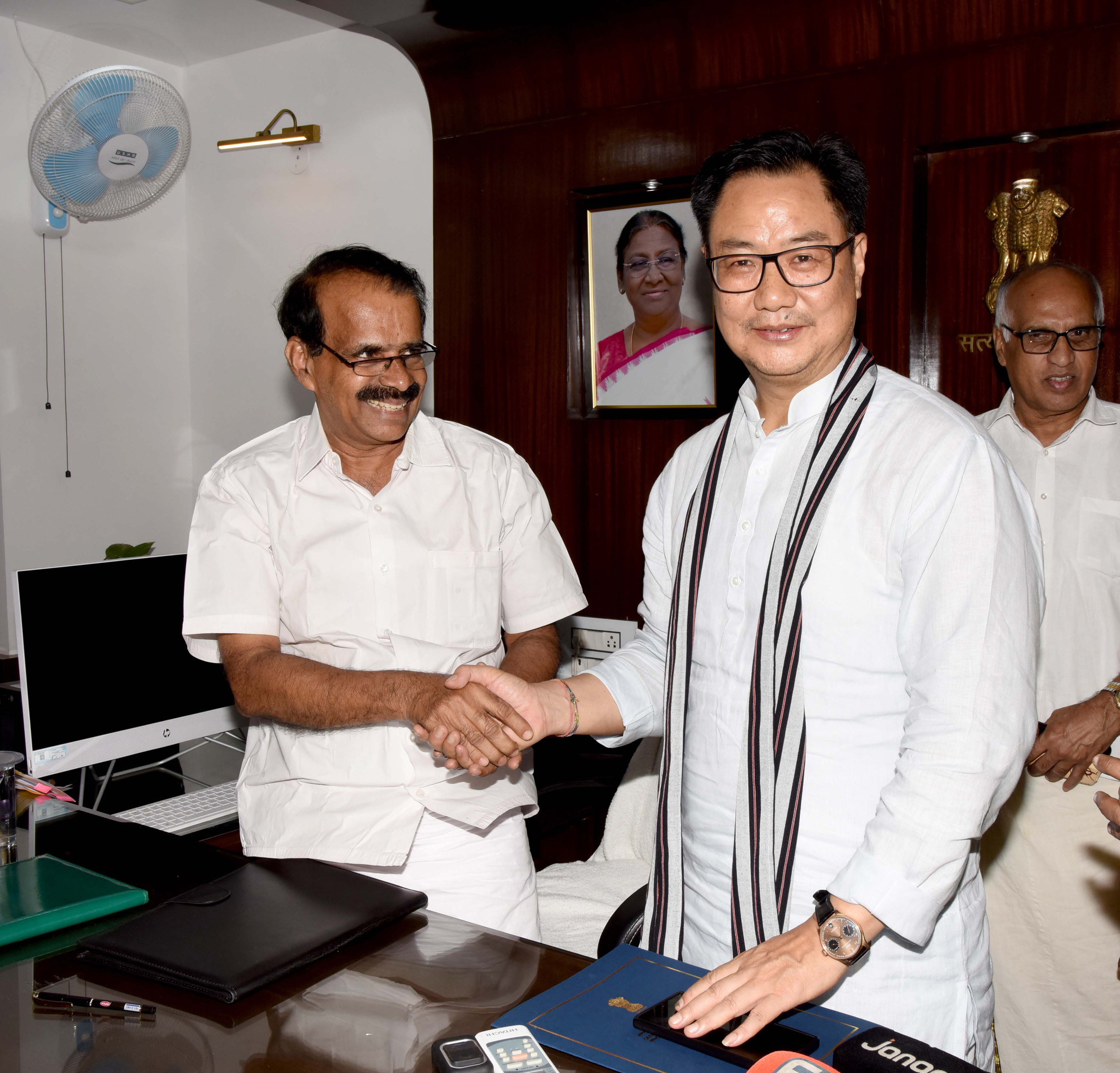
Shri George Kurian assumed charge as the Minister of State for Ministry of Minority Affairs

He joined the Bharatiya Janata Party (BJP) ever since the formation of the party in 1980. George has held various positions, such as membership in the national executive committee of BJP, as the national vice-president of Bharatiya Janata Yuva Morcha. He was the first Malayali to serve as the vice-chairman of the National Commission for Minorities. George was also appointed as an Officer on Special Duty (OSD) for the former Minister of State for Railways, O. Rajagopal. He later became a core committee member and vice-president of the BJP's Kerala unit. He has also served as a translator for the Prime Minister of India Narendra Modi during his visits to the state.

On 9 June 2024, he was sworn in as a Minister of State for Fisheries, Animal Husbandry and Dairying and Minority Affairs in the third Modi ministry.

Later, he was elected unopposed as Rajya Sabha member from Madhya Pradesh.

He resigned from the minister post on 23 June 2026 to focus on the BJP party organization works in Kerala.

== Elections ==
In 2016, Kurian unsuccessfully contested as a BJP candidate from Puthuppally Assembly constituency against the then Chief Minister of Kerala and Indian National Congress candidate Oommen Chandy.

=== Lok Sabha ===
Year	Constituency	Party	Votes	%	Opponent	Party	Votes	%	Result	Margin	%
1991	Kottayam	BJP	22,622	3.21	Ramesh Chennithala	INC	366,759	51.98	Lost	▼344,137	▼48.77
1996	Muvattupuzha	BJP	30,097	4.28	P. C. Thomas	KC(M)	382,319	54.41	Lost	▼352,222	▼50.13
1998	Kottayam	BJP	42,830	5.99	Suresh Kurup	CPI(M)	335,893	46.98	Lost	▼293,063	▼40.99

== Personal life ==
He is married to Lt. Col. O. T. Annamma who is a retired nursing officer in the Indian Army. They have two children, Adarsh George Pockaran and Akash George Pockaran.

== See also ==
- Third Modi ministry
