= Vedhagiri =

Village in Kottayam District, Kerala, India

Vedhagiri is in the Kottayam district, Kerala, India, and is famous for the ashram monastery of the Hindu guru (teacher) Vedhavyasa (Devanāgarī).

== Economy ==
Kottayam Textiles, a Kerala government-owned spinning mill); KSE Ltd., a cattle feed factory; Quest Scientific Research Organisation, and various other small-scale industries are running on and around the vedhagiri hill.

== Schools ==
Government UP school is the educational institution in vedhagiri.

== Temples and churches ==
SNDP Grumandhiram is the place of worship for Sri Narayana Guru's followers (Ezhavas). St. Mary's Syriac Catholic Church Vedhagiri, St. Mathew's Syriac Catholic Church, Kottakkupuram and St. Stephen's Knanaya Syriac Catholic Church, Kurumulloor are Christian churches in the area. The Mahatma Gandhi University Kottayam, the famous Ettumanoor Temple and the Athirampuzha church are within 5 kilometers of Vedhagiri.

== Transportation ==
There are several public and private bus services running through vedhagiri. The Ettumanoor railway station in 3 kilometers from Vedhagiri.
