= Government Medical College, Kottayam =

Medical college in Kerala, India

Coordinates: 9.632724°N 76.520945°E

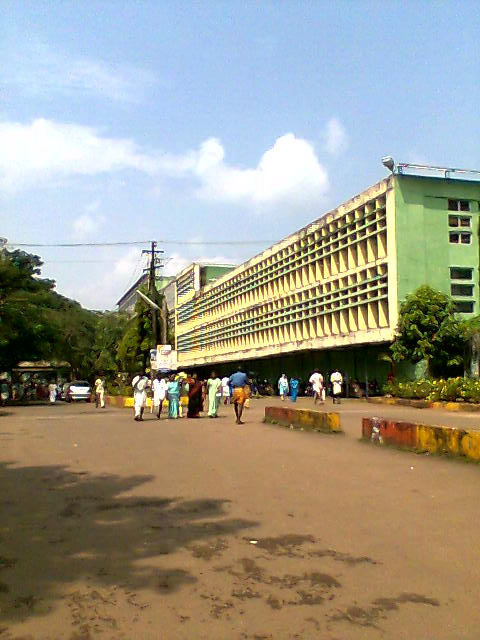
- Other name: GMC Kottayam
- Type: Government
- Established: 1962; 64 years ago
- Affiliations: Kerala University of Health Sciences, NMC
- Principal: Dr. Varghese Ponnuse
- Location: Gandhinagar, Kottayam, Kerala, India-686008
- Campus: Gandhinagar-Arpookkara
- Administration: Department of Health and Family Welfare, Government of Kerala; Directorate of Medical Education
- Nickname: KMC
- Website: kottayammedicalcollege.org

Government Medical College, Kottayam is a government medical college in Kerala, India. The campus is about 8 km (5.0 mi) north of Kottayam in Gandhinagar-Arpookkara area in Central Kerala.

== History ==
The college started functioning in December 1962 as the third government-run medical college in Kerala. The college which initially functioned in the District Hospital, Kottayam from 1962 to 1970 was shifted to Arpookara in April 1970.

In 1975, all clinical departments were shifted to the newly constructed campus at Arpookara, now named Gandhinagar. The same year, the nearby ESI Hospital was taken over to start the children's hospital: Institute of Child Health. A new administrative B block was started in 1985. In 1996, the C block was added which houses the departments of Pharmacology, Pathology, Microbiology and the Central Library.

Newly constructed block

=== Events ===
- 2008: Inauguration of C2 block and Anatomy, Physiology, Biochemistry and Community Medicine departments were shifted to the new block.
- 2018: Inauguration of new casualty block by chief minister of Kerala, Pinarayi Vijayan.

== Attached institutions ==
The collegiate institutions attached to Medical College Kottayam are Medical College Hospital (MCH), Institute of Child Health (ICH), Kottayam Medical College Health Center (KMCHC).

'Gandhinagar' from 1974. Construction of ABC and EFG blocks of MCH were completed during 1969 and 1970 respectively.

=== Institute of Child Health (ICH) ===
The Institute of Child Health is at about 1.5 km from the main medical college hospital campus. It was established in 1975. It houses the departments of pediatrics and pediatric surgery. It imparts curative and preventive health for children from all districts of central Kerala: Kottayam, Idukki, Pathanamthitta, Alapuzha and Ernakulam. The average daily outpatients being treated in this institution is 500. About 9,750 children are treated as inpatients annually in various specialties.

Leukemia ward (Walli's children cancer care centre): A newly constructed leukemia ward was commissioned on 29.10.2005 attached to the Institute of Child Health as a sponsored programme.

ICH family welfare centre, medical records library and incinerator room are attached to the Institute of Child Health.

=== Departments ===
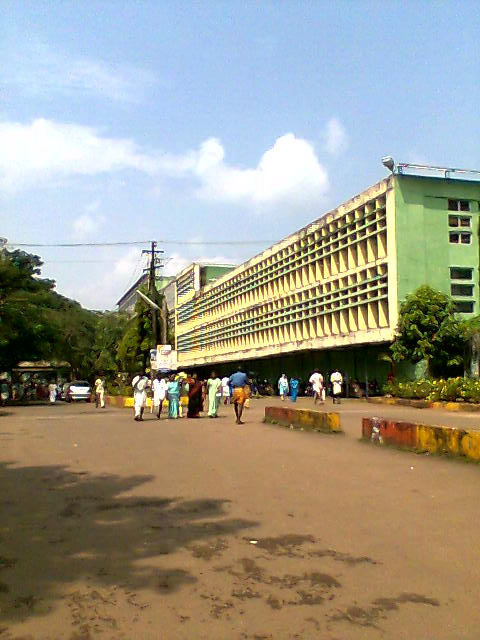
Medical college hospital

- Anaesthesiology
- Anatomy
- Biochemistry
- Cardiology
- Cardiothoracic and Vascular Surgery
- Community Medicine
- Dermatology & Venereology
- E N T
- Endocrinology
- Forensic Medicine
- Gastroenterology (Monday & Wednesday )
- General Surgery
- Internal Medicine
- Microbiology
- Nephrology
- Neurosurgery
- Obstetrics & Gynaecology
- Ophthalmology
- Orthopaedics
- Oral and Maxillofacial Surgery
- Paediatric Surgery
- Pathology
- Pediatrics
- Pharmaceutical Science
- Pharmacology
- Physical Education
- Physical medicine & Rehabilitation
- Physiology
- Plastic Surgery
- Psychiatry
- Pulmonary Medicine
- Radiodiagnosis and Interventional Radiology
- Radiotherapy
- T B and Chest Diseases
- Transfusion Medicine & Immunohaematology
- Urology
- Infectious disease unit

== Facilities ==
Through over 36 years the campus has grown into a small township with in house banking facilities, co-operative stores, Post Office, canteens, hotels, lodging facilities as well as subsidized hostels and accommodations for the faculty.

The bed strength of the Medical College Hospital alone is 2100, although the hospital frequently operates at 140%–150% capacity. The present facilities include: round the clock casualty service, Blood Bank facility, modern lab and imaging services, colour doppler, TMT, Holter monitor, haemodialysis, endoscopic & laparoscopic procedures, open heart surgery, specialised pain clinic under anaesthesiology, computerised pulmonary function lab under the Chest & TB dept, cardiac rehabilitation centre under Cardiology dept, specialised trauma care centre, advanced intensive care units for Surgery, Medicine, Cardiac services, Neuro-surgery & Plastic Surgery..

The House Surgeoncy Program has been acknowledged as a rigorous one with multiple training opportunities not readily available in some other teaching institutions — ensuring that graduates are well prepared for higher training. In fact, a majority of graduates go on to pursue PG courses, commendable given the few seats available for higher training in the country.

== Administration ==
College of Nursing, Kottayam is a full-pledged institution under the director of Medical Education. The professor and head (director) is the administrative head of College of Nursing who is responsible to the DME through principal Medical College, Kottayam. The administration and internal management of the college is vested with the professor and head.

Medical College Hospital is a 2100-bed hospital with 450 doctors and about 2,000 staff members. List of former principals.

== Courses offered ==
Main courses offered include MBBS, post-graduate training in basic specialties (M.D., MS and diploma courses) and super-specialties (DM and MCh), BDS, BSc Nursing and other paramedical courses.

Every year, 175 students get admitted for MBBS course through central government's NEET UG Examination.

=== Other courses ===
- Four years of BSc Nursing course with 12 months internship
- Three years Diploma in General Nursing and Midwifery
- MSc Nursing course started from 2004
- Medical Surgical Nursing
- Psychiatric Nursing
- Allied health courses – Radiological Technology, Medical Laboratory Technology, Ophthalmic Technology, Pharmacy course etc.

== Connections ==
Government Medical College, Kottayam is well connected by road and rail. Main Central Road MC Road connects the medical college from Samkranthi which is 2 km away. Ettumanoor is situated 7 km away from the college.

Kottayam, Kumaranalloor and Ettumanoor are the nearest railway stations.
