= Sreekandamangalam =

- village
- Location in Kerala, India Sreekandamangalam (India)
- Coordinates: 9°40′0″N 76°31′0″E
- Country: India
- State: Kerala
- District: Kottayam

Languages
  - Official: Malayalam, English
- Time zone: UTC+5:30 (IST)
- Postal code: 686562
- Vehicle registration: KL-05

Sreekandamangalam ("The City of Shiva") is a hamlet which belongs to the township of Athirampuzha in Kottayam district, Kerala, India.

Sreekandamangalam is ward 22 of Athirampuzha gram panchayat. The postal pin code is 686562.
