= Shilparatna =

Classical text of Indian performing arts

Shilparatna is a 16th-century classical treatise or text on traditional South Indian representational-performing arts. It is particularly influential in painting and theatrical performance.

It was authored by Srikumara in 16th century AD. In this the word Shilpa (sculptural) Ratna (Gems) is used as a broad term embodying artistic forms that either uses the body as a medium of expression (like Dance, Drama or Dance-Drama) or that which represents the body as an expression (like Sculptures and mural arts). It ranks only after the Natya Shastra and the Abhinaya Darpana as a text of fundamentals on the performing arts.

It lays down the tenets of painting such as the proper set of colours and the right combinations which leads to stylized balance and rhythm. It is adhered to as principles in South Indian paintings known as Dravidian mural art or Dravidian mural painting. The text describes yellow, white, red and terreVerte as the pure colours. These colours could be used as single colours or in combinations to make another chroma.

The Shilparatna also lays down principles for stage performance, like the optimal space for a performance. The NatyaGriha (classical Dance spaces and theatres), Natya (Postural dance) and Griha (house) in Kerala is made according to these principles and those laid down by the Natya Shastra. It describes the elaborate codified language of mudras (stylized gestures and symbolic signs by the hands and body posture used in Bharatanatyam and Kathakali) as angikabhinaya, meaning body-expressions.
