= Venniyani Mala =

Venniyani Mala is a mountain in Thodupuzha Taluk near Thodupuzha where Victor George, a photographer of Malayala Manorama daily, met his death in 2001 due to a landslide.
