= St. Mary's Forane Church, Athirampuzha =

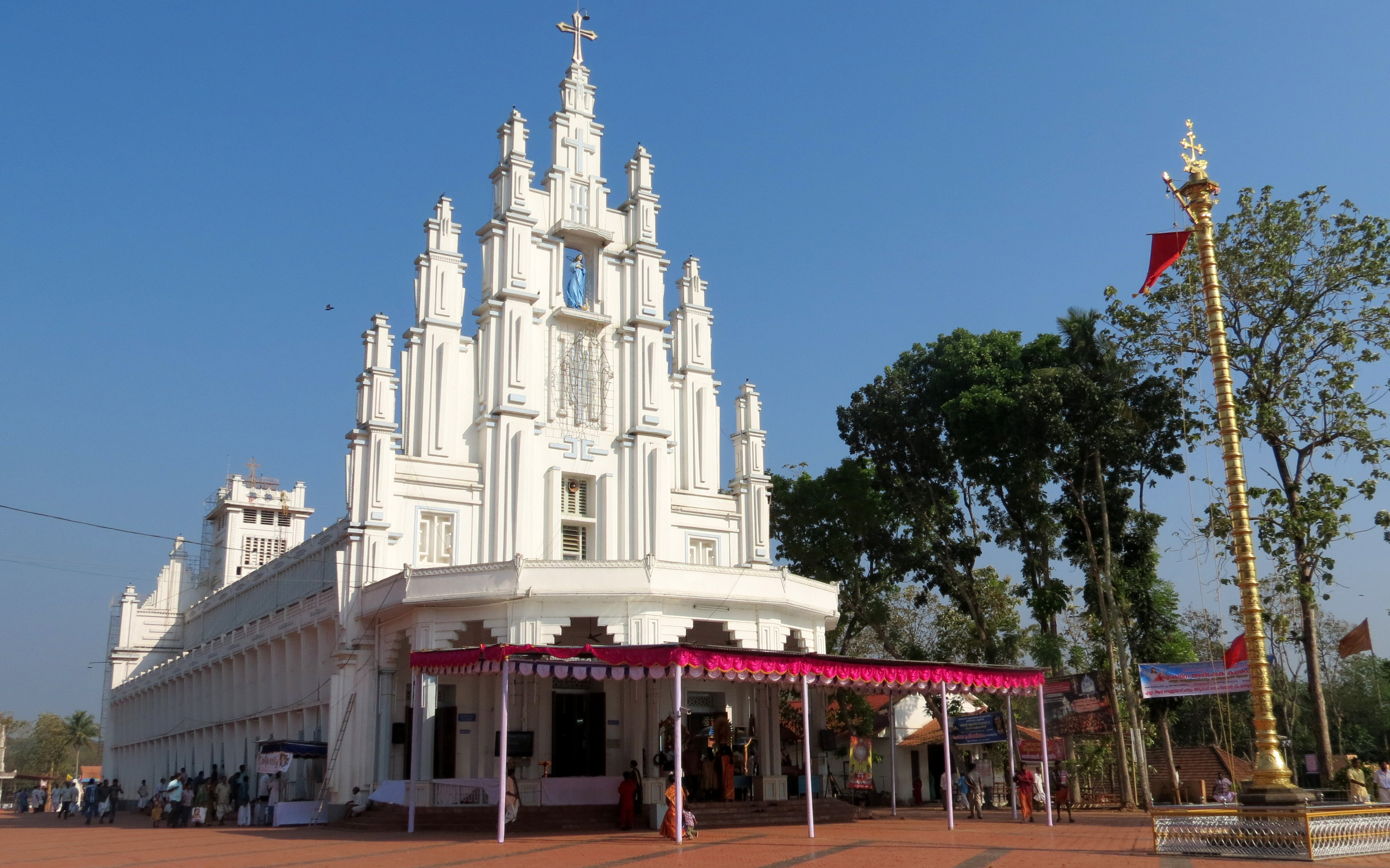
- Athirampuzha main church in 2013

- 9.658166°N 76.535182°E
- Location: Athirampuzha in Kottayam district, Kerala
- Country: India
- Denomination: Syro-Malabar Catholic Church

History
- Founded: August 15, 835; 1190 years ago
- Dedication: Main church: Saint Mary; Small church:Saint Sebastian

Architecture
- Architectural type: Main church: American architectural style; Small church: Gothic architecture

Administration
- District: Kottayam
- Archdiocese: Changanassery

St. Mary's Syro Malabar Forane Church, Athirampuzha is a Catholic church located in Kottayam district of Kerala, India. Located in a small village named Athirampuzha near Ettumanur, the church is also known as Athirampuzha church. Blessed on August 15, 835 AD, it is one of the oldest church and Christian pilgrim centre in Kottayam district.

== History ==
The Athirampuzha Church was established as a chapel of the Marth Mariam Syro-Malabar Church, Kuravilangad, which was established in 337 AD. In the days when there were no transportation facilities, the people of Athirampuzha-Madappad region had to travel about fifteen kilometers to reach the Kuravilangad Church for their spiritual needs. It was in this context that the church was established in Athirampuzha.

There is a popular legend about the establishment of the church. The eldest Namboothiri of Ettanasseri Illam, a Namboothiri family in Athirampuzha, was not blessed with children even after a long time of marriage. All the previous prayers were not fruitful. On the advice of Peruorthazhe Mappila, a devotee of Namboothiri's family, the people from the family prayed to the Holy Virgin Mary. The collective prayer was fruitful. His wife gave birth to a son. As per the promise made to Peruorthazhe Mappila, the first church was built in the name of the Holy Virgin Mary on the land donated by the family of Namboothiri as a token of gratitude for the success of their prayer.

The Church was blessed on 15 August 835 AD. On 1 January 1929, St. Mary's Church in Athirampuzha was elevated to the status of Ferona Church on the instructions of Mar James Kalassery, Bishop of the Diocese of Changanassery.

Leonard D'Cruz, a Portuguese sailor, brought a statue of Saint Sebastian here in 1687. The crucifix in this church is unique as it shows St. Sebastian without any wound. This is one of the three statues of Saint Sebastian brought to Kerala, the other two being at St. Andrew's Basilica, Arthunkal and Kuravilangad church. The smallest of the three statues, it was brought here by local traders from Athirampuzha who traded with Kochi.

== Main Church ==
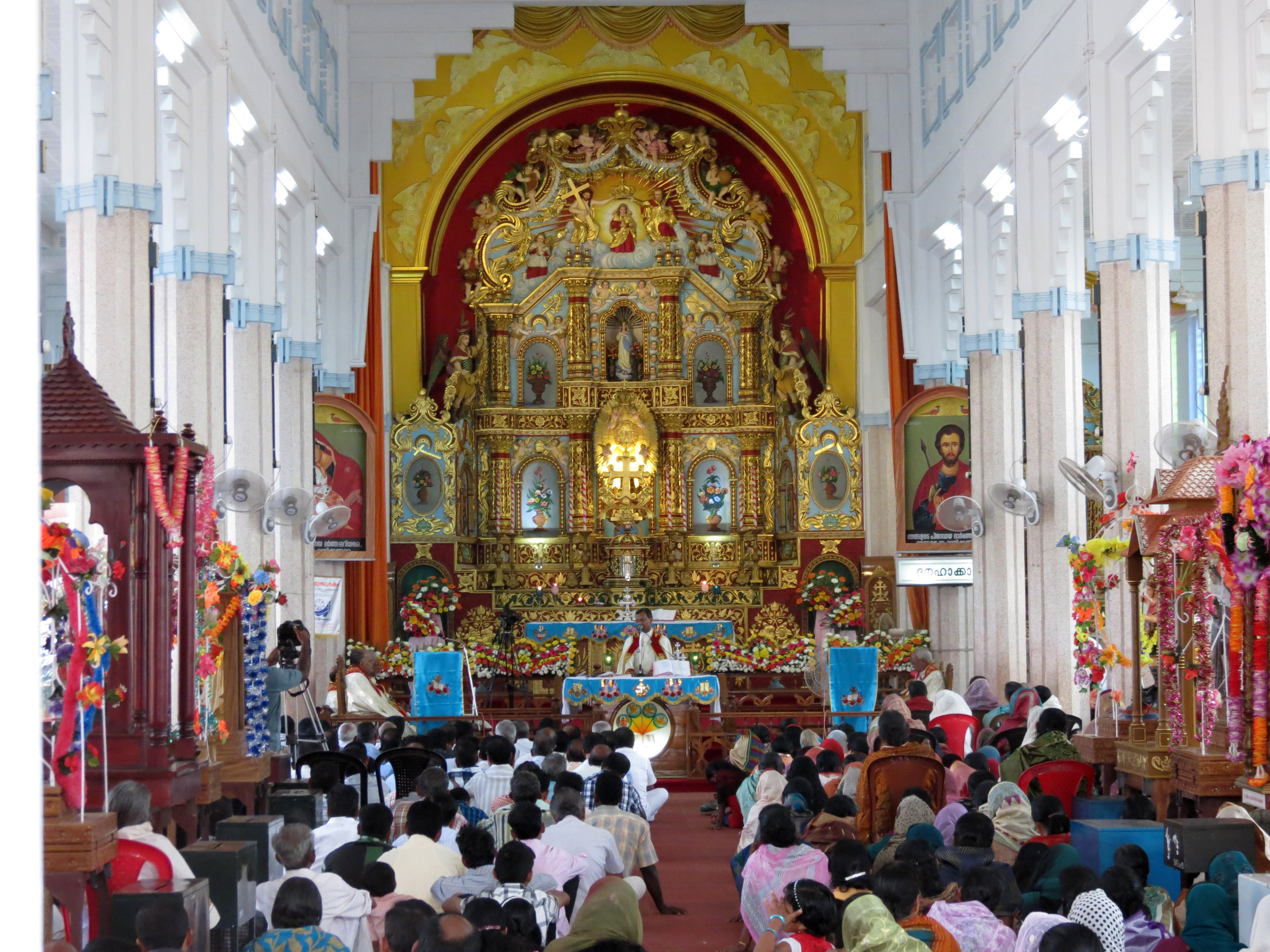
Athirampuzha Church altar

The main church dedicated to St. Mary is built in the American architectural style. It is 180 feet long and 55 feet wide.

Along with sculpture adaptations of all Mysteries of the Rosary, the "Rosary Garden" here also has a sculpture adaptation of Litany of the Blessed Virgin Mary, making it Asia's first "Rosary Garden" with a sculpture adaptation of Litany.

The three bells in the 85-foot-tall bell tower here were brought from Germany in 1905. Historical records in the church indicate that the bells costed 2187 rupees, 26 chakram and 4 kashu that time. Each bell has been engraved with names; St Michael, St Sebastian and St Maria. The main bell, the largest of the three, is 5 feet tall and weighs approximately 400 kilograms. From 2024 on, two of the church bells is rung by computer program with the help of electricity. The large bell has been exempted from electrification as it is a vow to be rung by hand. The bell is rung using a large rope. On the occasion of the church feast, the devotees will go up to the bell tower and ring the bell. In addition, during the feast the church bell will ring continuously from the time the procession descends until it. returns

Another noted feature of the Athirampuzha Church is the elaborate altar, which features a carved image of the Mother Mary's coronation and is decorated with gold. This altar remains unchanged even after renovation of the church.

== Small Church ==
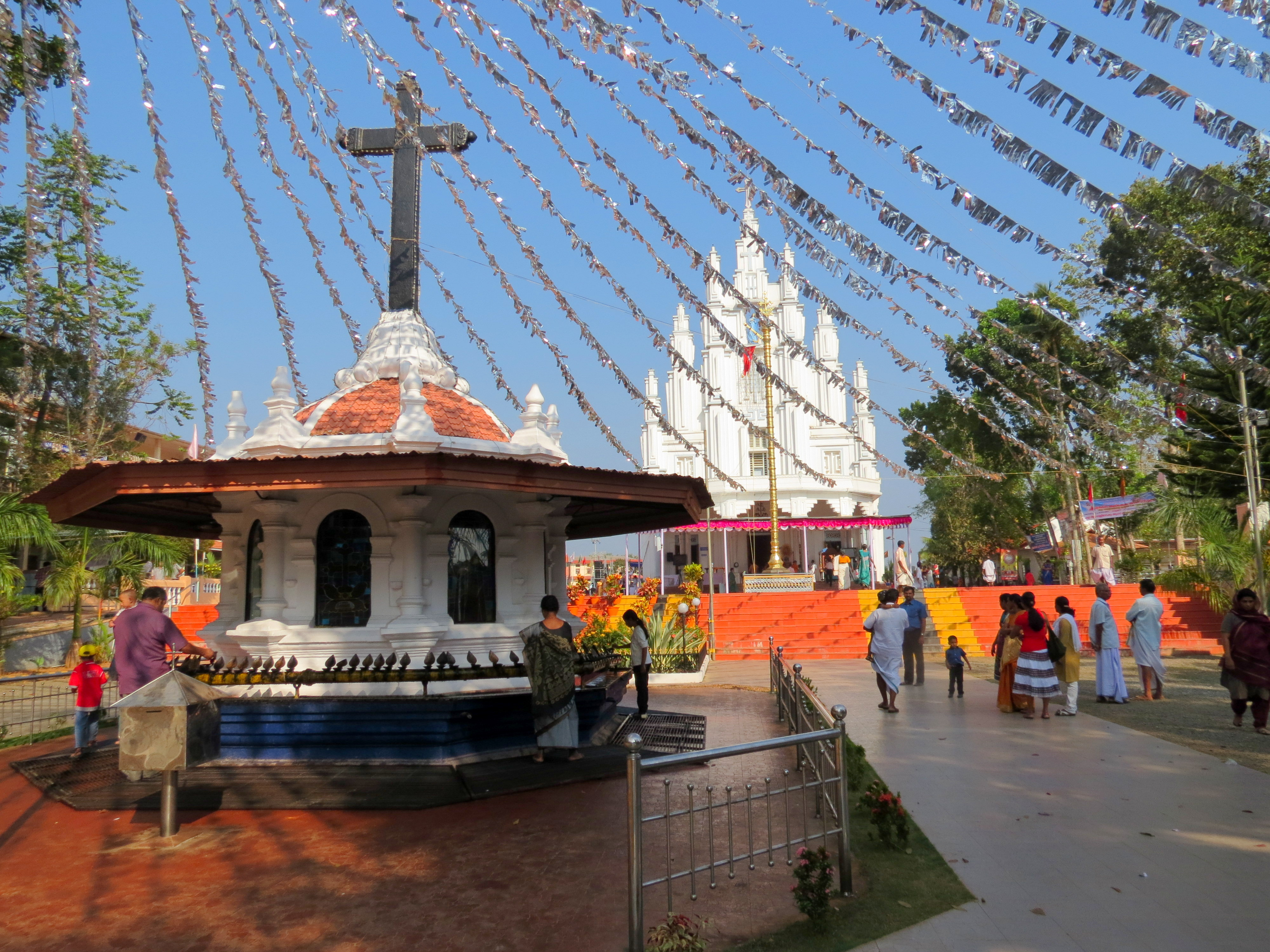
The granite cross at small church

It is said that when smallpox broke out in Athirampuzha and the surrounding areas and many people died, the entire people in the region prayed to Saint Sebastian on the instructions of the vicar to stop the epidemic and heal the sick, and the area was subsequently freed from that deadly disease. As a token of gratitude, a church was established in the name of St. Sebastian. It is now known as Cheriyapalli meaning small church. The small church is built in the Gothic architectural style.

The 18th century granite cross, carved from a single stone, is the main attraction in the small church. Pouring oil into the lamp surrounding the granite cross is an important Friday ritual.

== Location ==
The church is located at Athirampuzha, about 10 km from Kottayam town. The nearest bus station is Ettumanoor KSRTC Bus Stand, about 2.7 km away, nearest railway station is Ettumanoor railway station, about 2 km away, while the nearest major railway station is Kottayam railway station, which is 11 km away and the nearest airport is Cochin International Airport, which is 79 km away.

== Feast ==
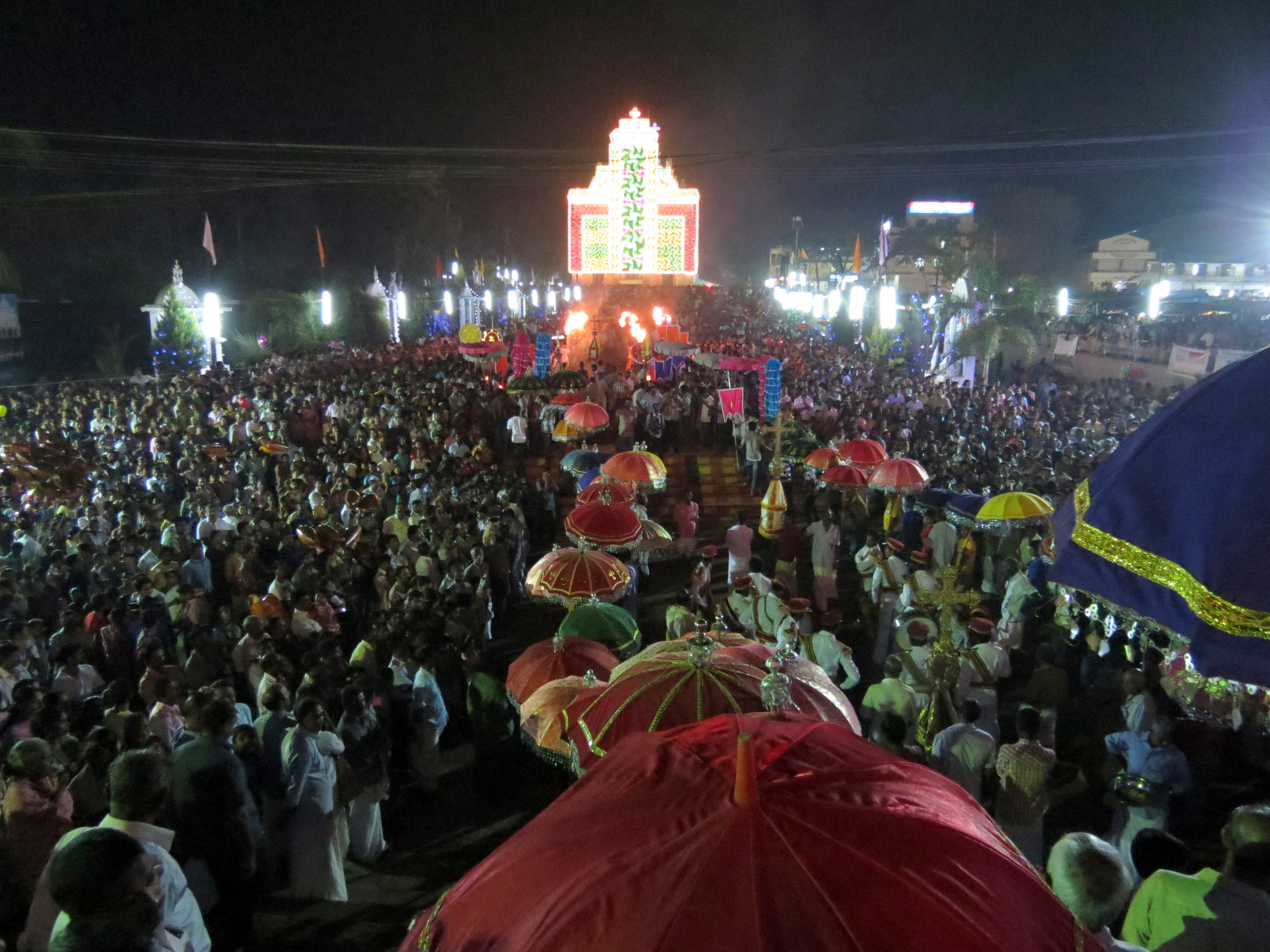
Feast procession in 2013

Athirampuzha Church has two major festivals, feast of St Sebastian observed in January every year and the St Mary's feast day observed in September. The feast of Saint Sebastian has been celebrated from the year 1647.

Although the Athirampuzha Church is dedicated to the Blessed Virgin Mary, the main feast here is the feast of Saint Sebastian, which is celebrated every year in the month of January. During the feast of St Sebastian, the idol of the saint will be taken down from the altar in the large church, adorned with religious ornaments, and taken in a procession to the small church in the presence of a large crowd, before being enshrined in the center of the church. The image of the saint is brought out of the altar only twice a year, and this is one of them. After that, the gold ornaments stored in the cellar of the main church will be carried to the marhaba by four men, accompanied by music and drum performances.

As part of the feast, a procession, which will start from the large church, will go around the small church and return to the large church. The images of more than twenty saints will be carried in the procession. The images of the Infant Jesus will be at the forefront and the image of Saint Sebastian will be at the back. However, the idol of Saint Sebastian, which is brought from the main church to the smaller church at the beginning of the feast, is not included in this. People carrying traditional items such as different types of crosses made of gold, silver, bronze, and wood, flags, specially designed beaded ornate umbrellas, alavattom, venchamaram, etc., and musical ensemble including Chenda players will accompany the procession.

There are also fireworks at night to mark the church's feast day. The Athirampuzha feast fireworkswas is believed to be the biggest fireworks in Kerala after Thrissur Pooram.

On the occasion of the feast of Saint Sebastian in the church, the Indian railway may issue order allowing temporary stops for some important trains that do not stop at Ettumanoor railway station, the nearest railway station to the church. This facility is being provided for the devotees who come to the church for the festival.

A local holiday is sometimes declared to mark the Athirampuzha Church feast.

== Educational Institutions ==
St. Aloysius Lower Primary School established in 1878, St. Mary's Girls High School established in 1929 and the St. Aloysius Higher Secondary School established in 1954 are the education institutions run by the St. Mary's Forane Church, Athirampuzha.
