= Kerala mural painting =

Hindu mythology frescoes in Kerala, India

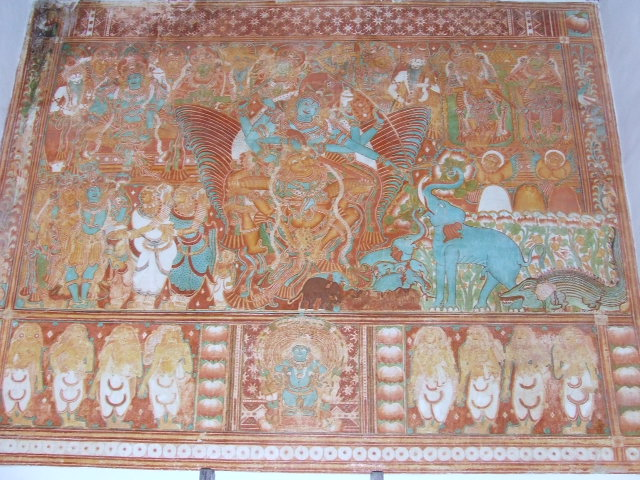
Gajendra moksham

Kerala mural paintings are frescoes that depict Hindu mythology in Kerala. Ancient temples and palaces in Kerala, India, display an extensive tradition of mural painting, most of which dates from the 9th to the 12th centuries CE, when this art form enjoyed royal patronage.

The scriptural basis of these paintings can be found in the Sanskrit texts, Chithrasoothram (Chitrasutra is a part of the Vishnu Dharmottara Purana, a book written in Sanskrit about 1,500 years ago. It contains 287 short verses in nine chapters and some prose passages in the second chapter. There is no other book on painting as detailed as the Chitrasutra. This book answers hundreds of questions about what a painting is, its purpose and role, and its relationship with the painter, connoisseurs and other arts. Chitrasutra is useful for understanding traditional Indian painting), Tantrasamuchaya, the fifteenth-century text authored by Narayanan, Abhilashitartha Chintamani of the twelfth century and Silparatna by Sreekumaran of the sixteenth century. The iconography of the mythological characters in the murals is based on the Dhyanaslokas.

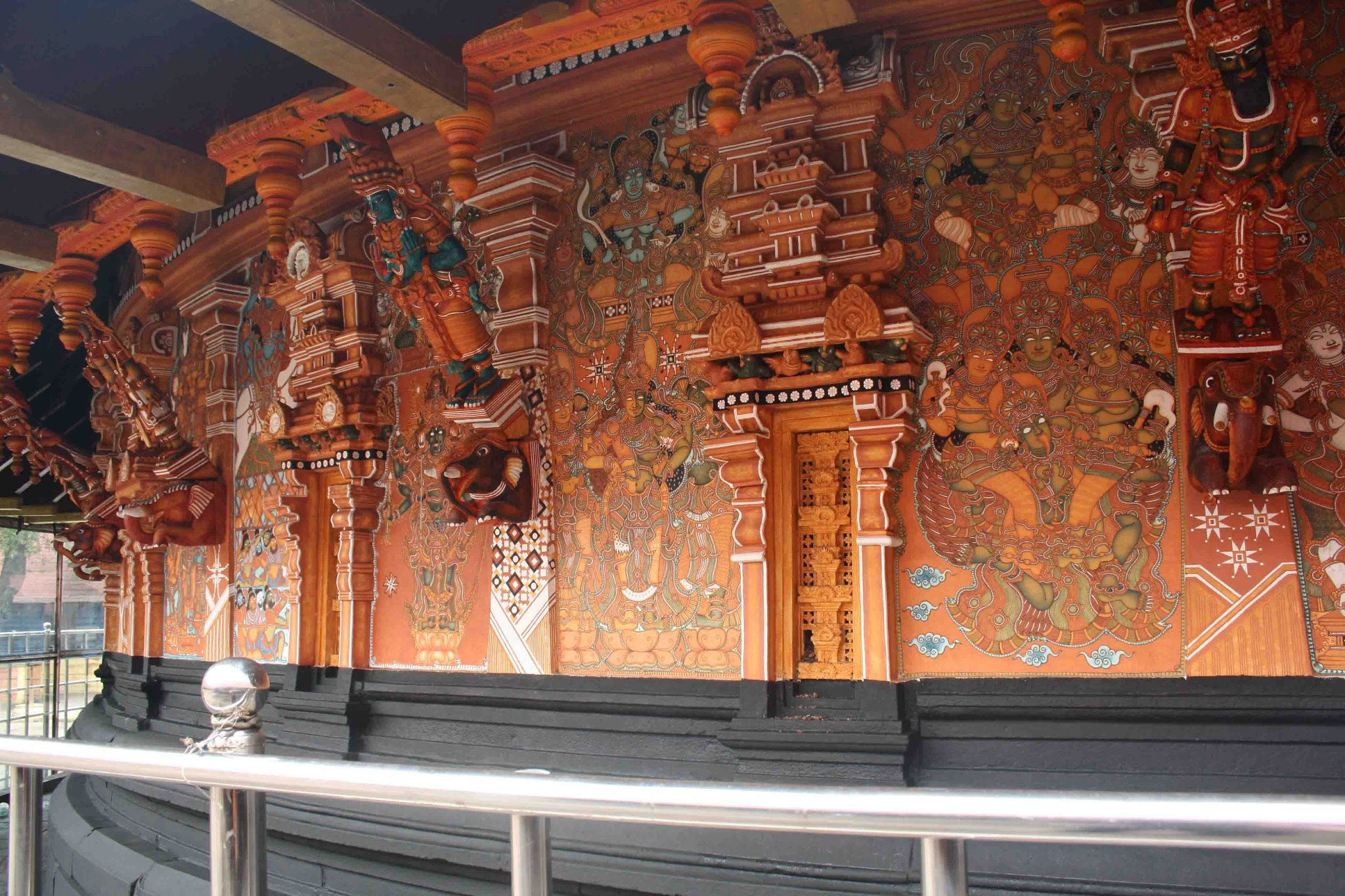
Mural paintings in the Vaikom Temple

The murals of Thirunadhikkara Cave Temple (now part of Tamil Nadu) and Tiruvanchikulam are considered the oldest surviving examples of Kerala's own mural style. The masterpieces of Kerala mural art include the Shiva Temple in Ettumanoor, the Ramayana murals of Mattancherry Palace and Vadakkumnatha kshetram.

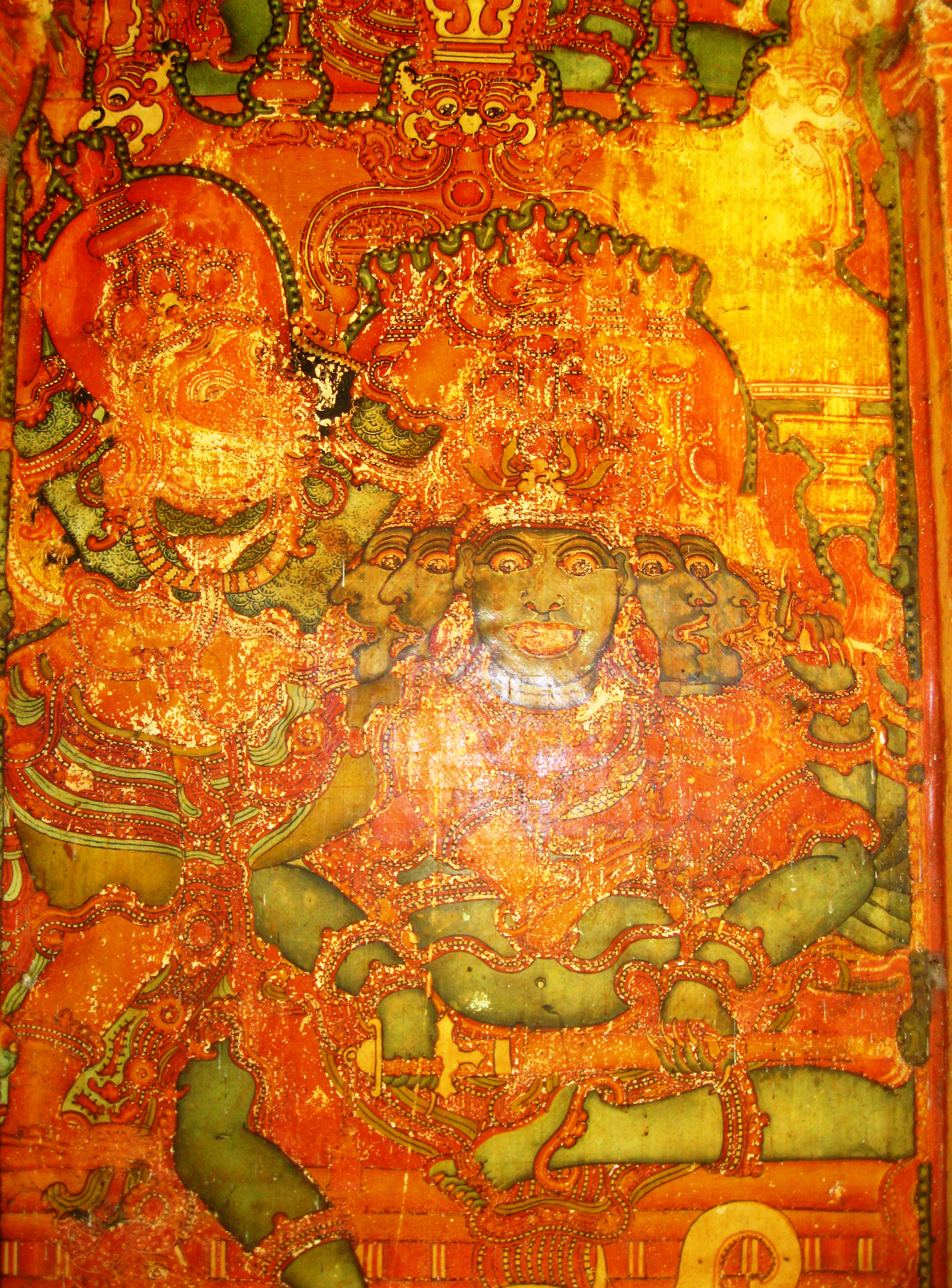
Thodeekkalam (Thodikkalam) Shiva Temple, Kannur district

Other fine mural paintings are found in temples at Trikodithanam, Vaikom Temple, Pundarikapuram, Udayanapuram, Triprangode, Guruvayoor, Kumaranalloor, Aymanam, the Vadakkunathan temple in Thrissur, the Thodeekkalam temple in Kannur and the Sri Padmanabhaswamy temple at Thiruvananthapuram. Other mural sites include the churches at Ollur, Chalakkudy, Kanjoor, Edappally, Vechur and Mulanthuruthy, and palaces such as the Krishnapuram Palace near Kayamkulam and the Padmanabhapuram Palace.

M. G. Shashi Bhushan, in his work Keralathile Chuvar Chithrangal, divides Kerala mural painting into four phases.

== Revival ==
Although traditional mural artisans were patronised by various rulers in Kerala, the art form suffered greatly under British administration and was at risk of extinction. After India's independence in 1947, the mural tradition was revived in several major temples in Kerala. The Centre for Study of Mural Paintings, a school established by the Guruvayur Devaswom Board in Thrissur district under the chief instructorship of Mammiyoor Krishnan Kutty Nair, represents this revival phase, as does the Sree Sankaracharya University of Sanskrit in Kalady, under the instruction of Saju Thuruthil.

== Technique ==
Traditionally, the painting involves four processes:

1. Preparation of the ground (granite and laterite walls)
2. Sketching of the outline
3. Application of colours
4. Addition of decorative details

Sanskrit texts discuss in detail the style, the effectiveness of different colours, desirable combinations produced by mixing various pigments, and methods of preparing the base and colours from different natural sources.

=== Wall preparation ===
Preparing a wall involves three stages of plastering with different substances:

1. Plaster made from a mixture of lime and clean sand in a ratio of 1:2.
2. Plaster made from a mixture of lime and sand in a ratio of 1:2, and cotton (Gossypium herbaceum). Cotton is used to give the wall a gleaming white texture.
3. 25–30 washes of a mixture of quicklime and the juice of tender coconut.

=== Colour preparation ===
Traditional murals exclusively used panchavarana (Sanskrit: five colours), i.e. red, yellow, green, black and white; white was the colour of the wall itself. Colours are prepared from vegetable and mineral pigments. Red is derived from red laterite, yellow from yellow laterite, white from lime, and black from oil-lamp soot. Leaves of the Neelamari plant (Indian indigo; Indigofera tinctoria) are squeezed, and the extract is dried and mixed with Eravikkara (Garcinia morella) to obtain the green pigment. Wooden utensils are used to mix the colours, and the binding media are derived from tender coconut water and extracts from the neem tree (Azadirachta indica).

The characters in the murals are coloured according to their characteristics, as described in the relevant Hindu mythological scriptures. Spiritual, divine and dharmic characters (satwika) are depicted in shades of green. Characters associated with power and material wealth (rajasic) are painted in shades ranging from red to golden yellow. Evil, wicked and mean characters (tamasic) are generally painted in white or black.
