= Victor George =

Indian photographer (1955–2001)

- Born: 10 April 1955; Kanakkary, Kottayam, India
- Died: 9 July 2001 (aged 46); Thodupuzha, Idukki, India
- Occupation: Photojournalism
- Spouse: Lilly
- Children: 2

Victor George (10 April 1955 – 9 July 2001) was an Indian photographer who died while photographing landslides in Kerala. He was the chief photographer of the Malayala Manorama.

== Early life ==
Victor was born in the Pattithananm-Kanakkary village, Kottayam district, Kerala. He studied English literature at university. His brother introduced him to photography.

== Career ==
In 1981, Victor joined Malayala Manorama, a Malayalam daily. From 1985 to 1990, he worked in their Delhi bureau. The photographs taken by him during the 1986 National Games won him initial recognition in the field. His shots of the swimmer Anita Sood with Kavita Sood cheering her from the gallery during the women's 400-metre freestyle brought Victor instant recognition. His photograph of the Indian relay team dropping the baton in a disastrous finish at the 1989 South Asian Federation Games, Kolkata, was widely appreciated.

In 1990, Victor became the Chief Photographer of Malayala Manorama.

== Death ==
On 9 July 2001, Victor set out from Kottayam to cover a landslide that had claimed three lives in Cheppukulam, near Thodupuzha, in the hilly Idukki district of Kerala. That afternoon, torrential rains triggered another landslide in Venniyani Mala, which killed Victor. His remains were recovered 3 kilometres (1.9 mi) from the site of the landslide two days later.
