= Amalagiri =

- suburb
- Location in Kerala, India Amalagiri (India)
- Coordinates: 9°38′N 76°32′E
- Country: India
- State: Kerala
- District: Kottayam

Government
  - Body: Athirampuzha Panchayat

Languages
  - Official: Malayalam, English
- Time zone: UTC+5:30 (IST)
- PIN: 686561
- Telephone code: 0481
- Vehicle registration: KL-05
- Nearest city: Kottayam
- Literacy: 95%
- Lok Sabha constituency: Kottayam
- Vidhan Sabha constituency: Ettumanoor
- Civic agency: Athirampuzha Panchayat
- Climate: Moderate (Köppen)

== Location ==
Amalagiri is a suburb of Kottayam town in Kerala, India. The place is a semi-urban residential area located 9 km north west of Kottayam town.

== Etymology ==
Amalagiri means pure hill (Amala = pure, giri = hill).

== Landmarks ==
The Institute of Child Health (ICH) of Govt. Medical College, Kottayam and Bishop Kurialacherry College for Women are located here.

== History ==
The place was originally called Ammancherry, meaning 'Place of Amman'(a slang referring to the people of Paraya cast). This place was christened Amalagiri by the 'Sisters of the Adoration of the Blessed Sacrament'(SABS) who founded Bishop Kurialacherry College(B.K. College) here in 1965. A post office set up at this place was also named Amalagiri. Even though replaced with the name Amalagiri, the name Ammancherry is still used to refer to the main junction here.

== Economy ==
Amalagiri was a low key residential area till the early 1980s. The land mostly belonged to farmers. After the establishment of Mahatma Gandhi University at Priyadarsini Hills, about 1.5 km away from Amalagiri, the place got mooted as a prime residential area. Now, many housing complexes dot the place.

== Geography ==
Amalagiri has a midland geography with small hills, plain land and marshy areas. The area is lush green with mixed vegetation. Amalagiri receives a fair amount of rain throughout the year. Temperature ranges between a minimum of 18 °C in winter and a maximum of 33 °C in summer.

== Map of Amalagiri ==
http://maps.google.co.in/maps?f=q&source=s_q&hl=en&geocode=&q=amalagiri&ie=UTF8&hq=&hnear=Amalagiri,+Kerala&z=15
