= Kanakkary =

- Village
- Location in Kerala, India Kanakkary (India)
- Coordinates: 9°42′0″N 76°32′0″E
- Country: India
- State: Kerala
- District: Kottayam

Government
  - Body: Grama Panchayat

Population (2011)
  - Total: 22,793

Languages
  - Official: Malayalam, English
- Time zone: UTC+5:30 (IST)
- PIN: 686632
- Vehicle registration: KL-67
- Nearest city: Kochi
- Lok Sabha constituency: Kottayam
- Civic agency: Grama Panchayat
- Distance from Kanakkary- Kottayam-14km Ernakulam-58km Thiruvananthapuram-164km

Kanakkary is a small village in Kottayam district of Kerala state, India. The name Kanakkary is attributed to a lady who frequently visited the village to collect Kanam (revenue tax) in the pre-historic times.

== Location ==
Kanakkary is 72 km south of Kochi and 14 km north of Kottayam. Kanakkary is located 4.4 km from Ettumanoor Mahadeva Temple and near the Vedagiri spinning mill. It is located 8 km from the Mahatma Gandhi University campus and 8 km from St Mary's Forane Church, Kuravilangad.650 metres from new Rajasthan Marbles.

== Landmarks ==
Kanakkary has a famous Lord Krishna temple. Also, St. Jude's Chapel is on the Kanakkary-Athirampuzha road.

== Transportation ==
The major road passing through Kanakkary is the State Highway 15 (SH 15), also locally known as EE Road or Ettumanur-Ernakulam Road, which links Cochin (Kochi) and Kottayam. Kottayam to Ernakulam railway line also runs through Kanakkary.

== Schools ==
Govt High School Kanakkary which was inaugurated by former Prime Minister Mrs Indira Gandhi boasts the biggest play grounds of the Palai education district. Kanakkary also used to have a famous Chirakulam (pond) which has been ruined since some time. Kanakkary was also known for its CSI Hospital (now closed) and also inaugurated C.S.I Law College (managed by CSI) in hospital Jn: Kanakkary.

== Demographics ==
As of 2011 India census, Kanakkary had a population of 22793 with 11249 males and 11544 females.
