= Kurumulloor =

- village
- Country: India
- State: Kerala
- District: Kottayam

Languages
  - Official: Malayalam, English
- Time zone: UTC+5:30 (IST)
- Vehicle registration: KL-
- Coastline: 0 kilometres (0 mi)

Kurumulloor is a small village located around 3 miles from Ettumanoor, Kottayam district, Kerala, India.

== Subramanya Swamy Temple ==
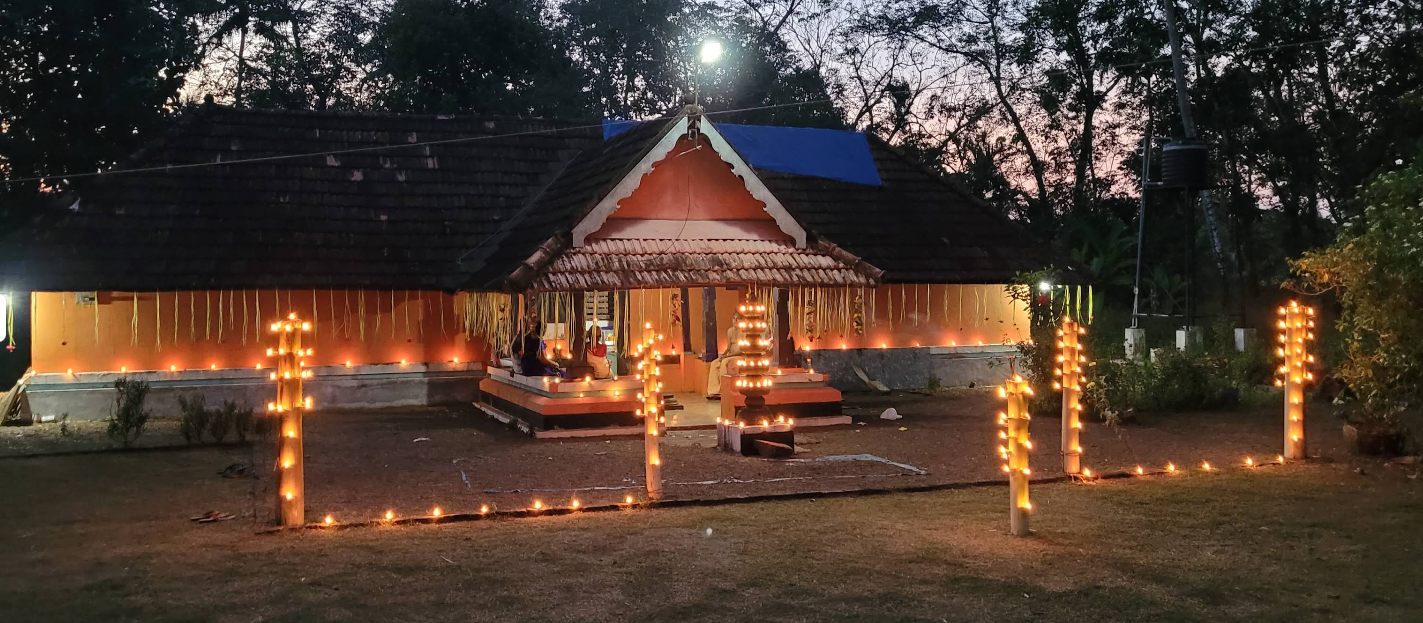
swayambhu sri subramanya swami temple deity murugan

Subramanya Swamy temple is an ancient murugan temple in Kurumulloor, Kottayam, Kerala. It is famous for its circular sreekovil made entirely out of huge stone carved into a circular shape.
