= Ettumanoor =

- Municipality
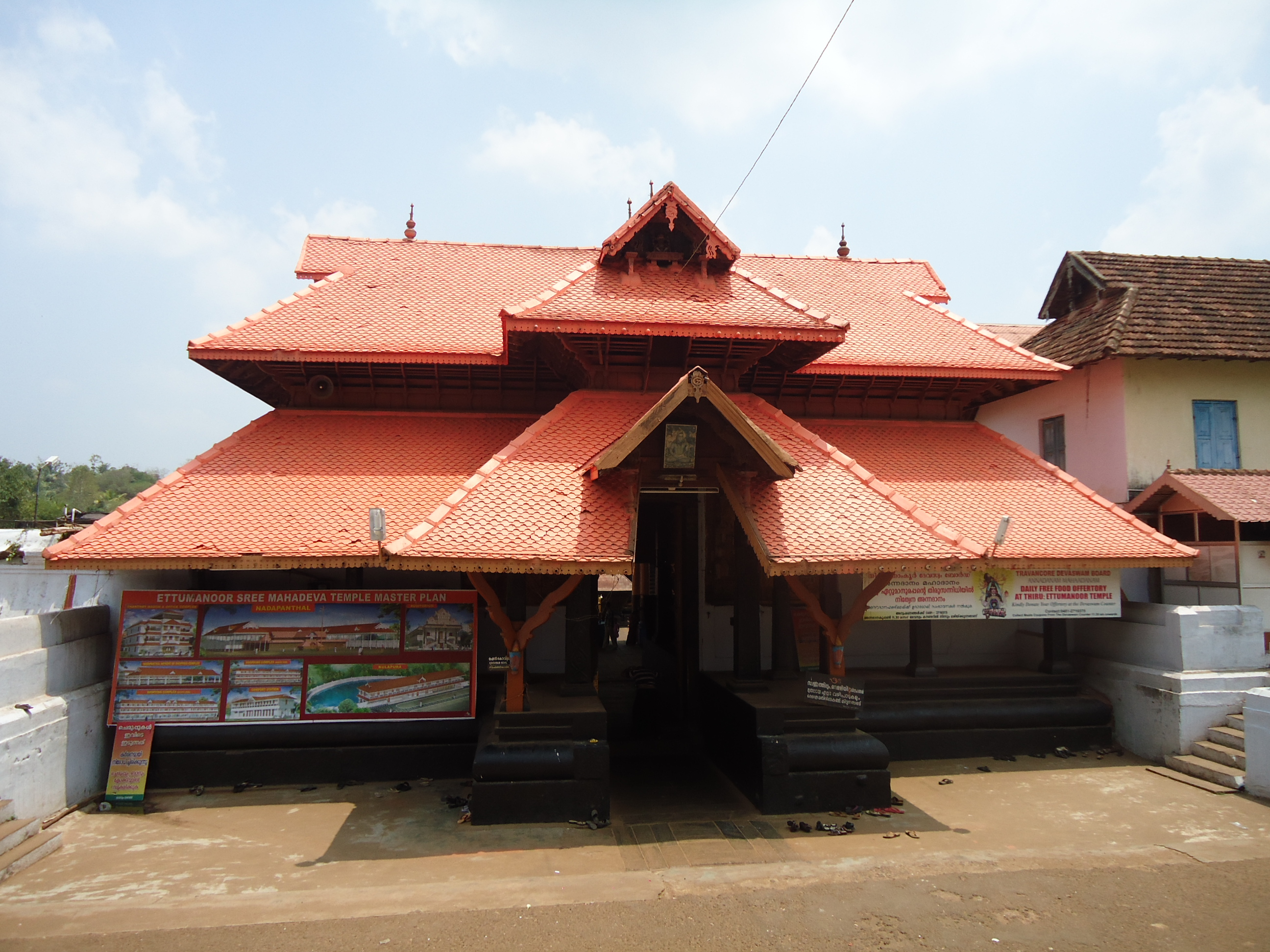
- North entrance to the temple

- Location in Kerala, India Ettumanoor (India)
- Coordinates: 9.67°N 76.57°E
- Country: India
- State: Kerala
- District: Kottayam

Area
  - Total: 27.8 km^{2} (10.7 sq mi)
- Elevation: 4 m (13 ft)

Population (2011)
  - Total: 51,129
  - Density: 1,840/km^{2} (4,760/sq mi)

Languages
  - Official: Malayalam, English
- Time zone: UTC+5:30 (IST)
- PIN: 686631
- Vehicle registration: KL-05
- Nearest city: Kottayam
- Literacy: Nearly 100%
- Lok Sabha constituency: Kottayam

Ettumanoor ([eːt̪uːmaːnuːr]) is a municipality in the Kottayam district of Kerala, India. It is located approximately 10 km (6.2 mi) north of the district headquarters at Kottayam and about 163 km (101.3 mi) north of the state capital, Thiruvananthapuram. According to the 2011 Indian census, Ettumanoor has a population of 51,129 and a population density of 1,839/km^{2} (4,760/sq mi).

== Etymology ==
The name Ettumanoor has several traditional and mythological explanations. One popular interpretation derives it from the Malayalam words maan (deer) and ooru (place), meaning "place of deer". Another version suggests that the name comes from Ettu Mana Ooru, meaning "the land of eight manas", referring to eight Namboothiri Brahmin households (Ashta Grihas) who are traditionally regarded as the original trustees (ooralans) of the Ettumanoor Mahadeva Temple.

Another legend states that Shiva appeared at this place in eight (ettu) different forms, which is also believed to have contributed to the name Ettumanoor.

Local tradition holds that Ettumanoor is a historically significant site. According to legend, the Pandavas and the sage Vyasa were associated with the establishment of the Ettumanoor Mahadeva Temple.

== Transportation ==
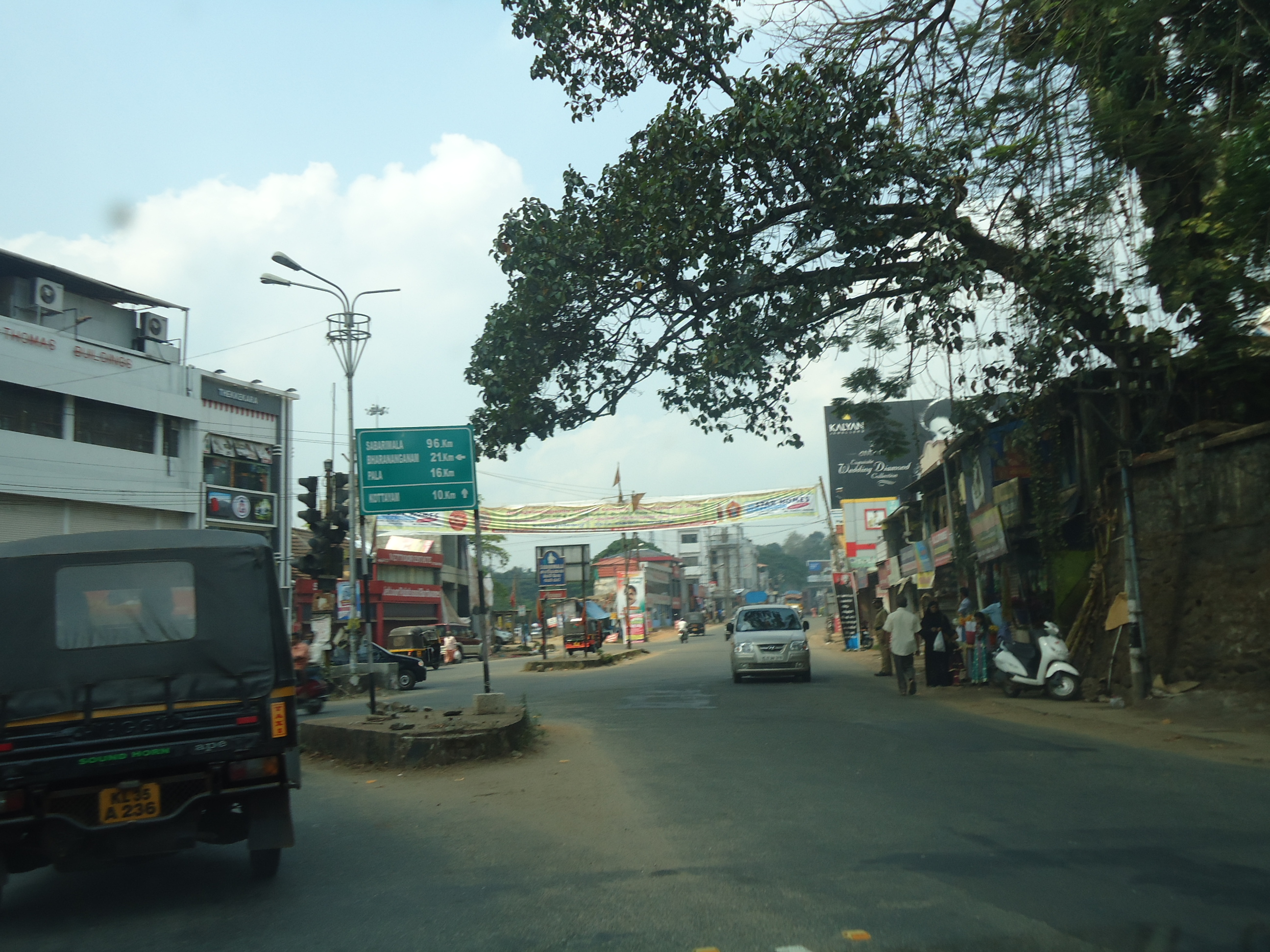
Ettumanoor main junction

Ettumanoor has two main bus stands: a Kerala State Road Transport Corporation (KSRTC) station with an adjoining bus bay, and a privately operated bus stand. The town is served by deluxe, express, and inter-state buses. Direct services are available to major destinations including Bangalore, Mangalore, Theni, Cumbum, Velankanni, Palani, Madurai, Tuticorin, Kanyakumari, Salem, and Coimbatore.

The two bus stands are located close to each other, with a large market situated between them. This setup contributes to Ettumanoor's role as a local commercial centre. Two state highways intersect within the town, and two additional highways originate from it, making Ettumanoor an important transit point for the region.

== Economy ==
Ettumanoor hosts an industrial estate under the Government of Kerala, along with a production centre under the Government of India, which together form the town's principal industrial facilities. The industrial estate is noted as the only such facility in Kerala functioning under the Ministry of Labour, Government of India. The main products manufactured in the area include rolling shutters, bakery items, rubber products, and products made of wood.

Since the 1950s, Ettumanoor has also been recognised as a major centre for the trade of building materials in the Central Travancore region.

== Education ==
Mahatma Gandhi University, established on 2 October 1983, is located at Athirampuzha, approximately 6.7 km (4.2 mi) south-west of Ettumanoor. Government-run educational institutions in the town include an Industrial Training Institute (ITI), a Government Boys' Higher Secondary School, a Government Girls' Model High School, a Teachers' Training School, and a Lower Primary School.

Privately managed institutions include SFS Public School and Junior College, Shree Vidyadhiraja Higher Secondary School, and Ebenezer International Residential School. The Town U.P. School is a privately aided institution established in 1918. Higher education institutions in and around Ettumanoor include Mangalam College of Engineering and Ettumanoorappan College, Ettumanoor.

There are more than a dozen colleges and professional institutions within the Ettumanoor Assembly constituency. Ettumanoor also serves as the headquarters of the Kerala Chuvar Chithra Kala Kendram, under the Government of Kerala.

== Hospitals ==
Government Medical College, Kottayam is located approximately 6 km (3.7 mi) from Ettumanoor town. Direct public and private bus services operate between Ettumanoor and the medical college. A Kerala Government–run general hospital is also located in Ettumanoor, near the former panchayat office, providing general treatment services.

Private healthcare facilities in and around Ettumanoor include Caritas Hospital and Matha Hospital, both situated within a 3 km (1.9 mi) radius of the central junction towards Kottayam. Mitera Hospital, which specialises in maternal and child healthcare, is located at Thellakom.

== Politics ==
Ettumanoor Assembly constituency forms part of the Kottayam (Lok Sabha constituency).

The major political parties active in Ettumanoor include the Indian National Congress, the Communist Party of India (Marxist), the Communist Party of India, the Kerala Congress, and the Bharatiya Janata Party. As of the most recent municipal administration, the Ettumanoor Municipality is governed by the Indian National Congress.

== Ettumanoor Shri Mahadeva Temple ==
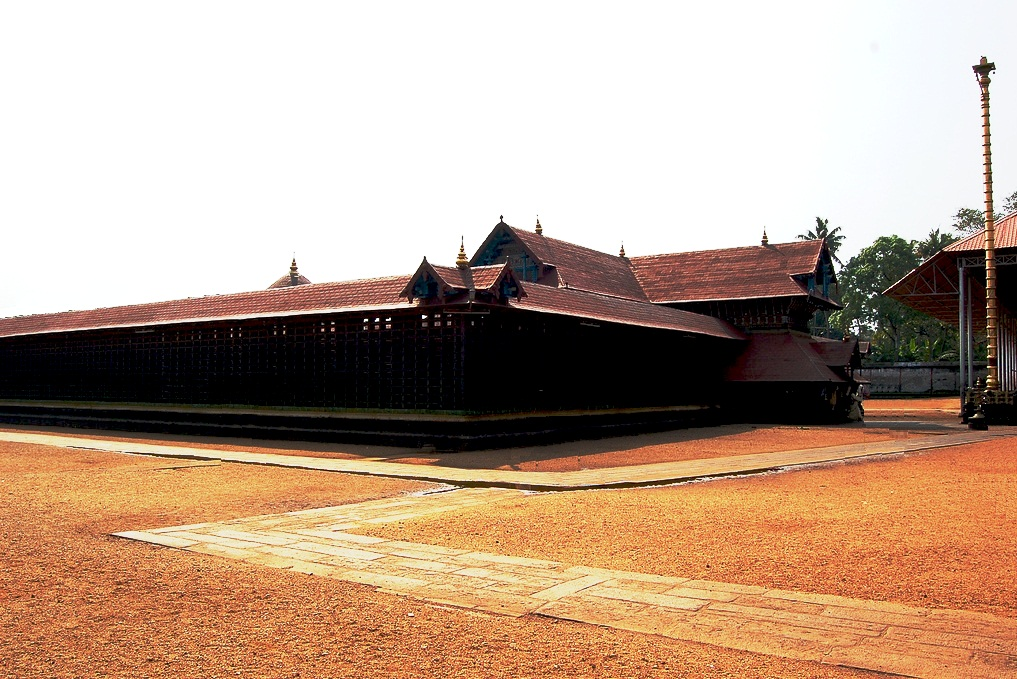
Ettumanoor Mahadevar Temple

The ancient Ettumanoor Shri Mahadeva Temple is one of the most prominent landmarks of Ettumanoor and has contributed significantly to the town's cultural and religious identity. According to local tradition, the Pandavas and the sage Vyasa are believed to have worshipped at this temple. The present temple structure, including the gopuram and the surrounding fortifications, was reconstructed in 717 ME (1542 AD). The temple features Dravidian-style mural paintings on the walls inside and outside the main entrance. Among these, the fresco depicting Pradosha Nritham (the dance of Shiva) is regarded as one of the finest examples of wall painting in India. The temple has a golden flagstaff topped with a sculpted bull, adorned with small bells and metal leaves shaped like those of a banyan tree. The roofs are covered with copper sheets and are crowned with 14 ornamental finials. In addition to the main deity, shrines dedicated to Bhagavati, Sastha, Ganapathy, and Yakshi are present. Tradition also holds that the philosopher Shankaracharya composed the Saundarya Lahari while staying at the temple.

=== Festivals ===
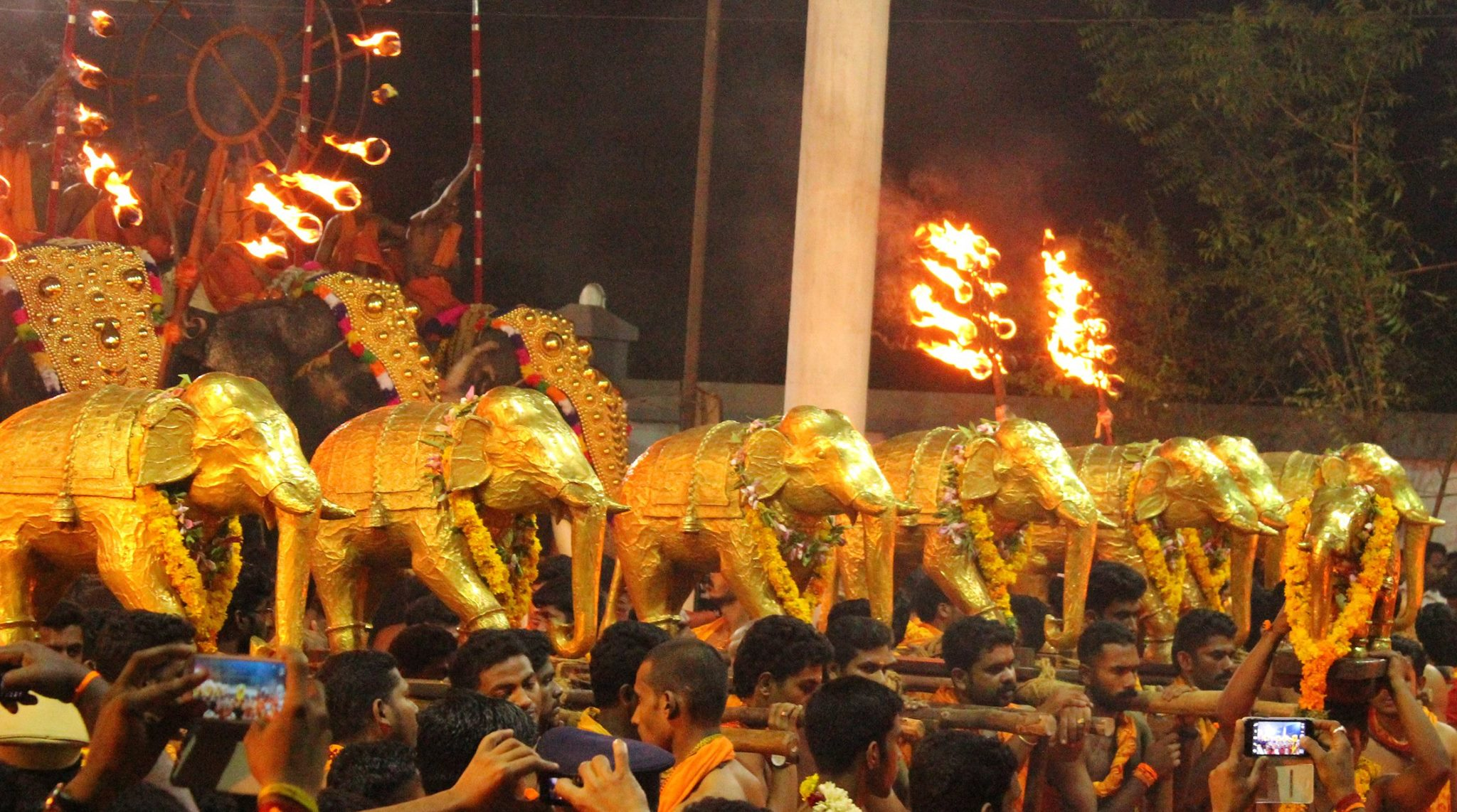
Ezhara Ponnana festival

The Ettumanoor Mahadevar Temple is known for its annual arattu festival, celebrated on a large scale on the day of Thiruvathira during February–March. Large numbers of devotees visit the temple, particularly on the eighth and tenth days of the festival, when the Ezhara Ponnana—seven-and-a-half golden elephants weighing approximately 13 kg (28.7 lb)—are ceremonially displayed. These golden elephants were donated to the temple by a Maharaja of Travancore. The temple, administered by the Travancore Devaswom Board, possesses several valuable ritual and ceremonial objects.

The Thulabharam ritual is also an important practice at the temple, in which devotees are weighed against offerings such as fruits or other items, symbolising gratitude for perceived blessings received. As a result of its religious significance, Ettumanoor is recognised as an important Hindu pilgrimage centre.

According to temple tradition, the deity Ettumanoorappan is believed to have originated from Kattampakkam, a village in the Kottayam district. Local legends further associate the temple town with visits by sages, including Vyasa, reflecting its long-standing religious importance.

== Ettumanoor railway station ==
Ettumanoor railway station played an important role as a logistical hub for the supply of steel during the construction of the Idukki dams. Several express trains, including the Venad Express and the Parasuram Express, have scheduled halts at the station. During major festivals at the Ettumanoor Mahadevar Temple, additional express services, such as the Vanchinad Express, are provided with special stops at Ettumanoor railway station.

== Radio Mangalam 91.2 FM ==
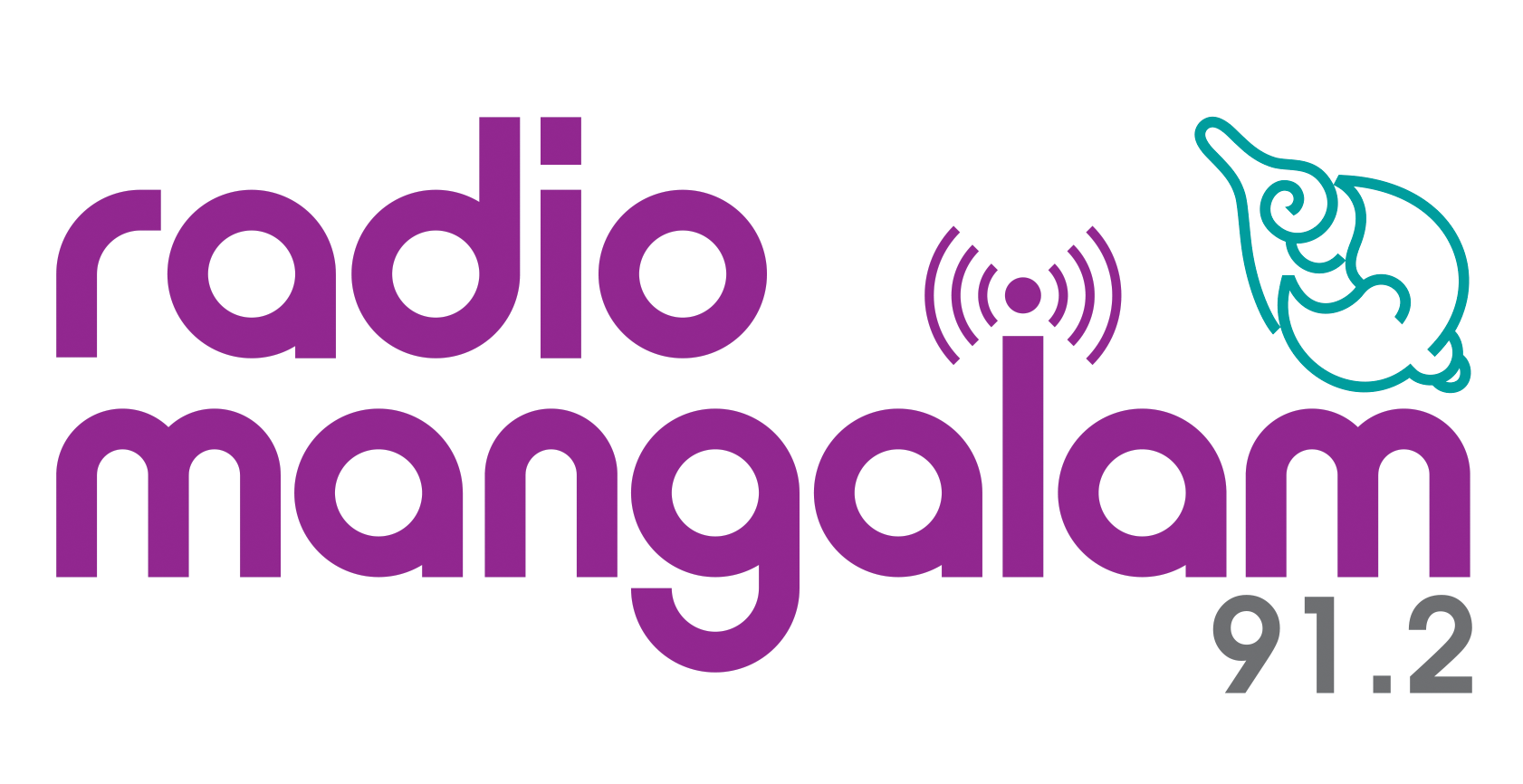
Radio Mangalam logo

Radio Mangalam 91.2 FM is a community radio station managed by Mangalam College of Engineering. It has been operational since 2016 and broadcasts programmes primarily aimed at the local community.

The station airs three live programmes daily. Mangalam Wishes, broadcast from 8:00 a.m. to 10:00 a.m., features greetings and messages from listeners. Mangalam Vani, aired between 1:00 p.m. and 2:00 p.m., focuses on discussions, interviews, and topics of local and community interest. The evening programme, Crazy Time, broadcast from 7:30 p.m. to 8:30 p.m., provides entertainment-oriented content. These programmes reflect the station's emphasis on community participation and locally relevant broadcasting.

== Notable people ==
- Karoor Neelakanta Pillai
- S. P. Pillai
- Victor George
- V. D. Rajappan
- George Kurian
- Dennis Joseph

== Gallery ==
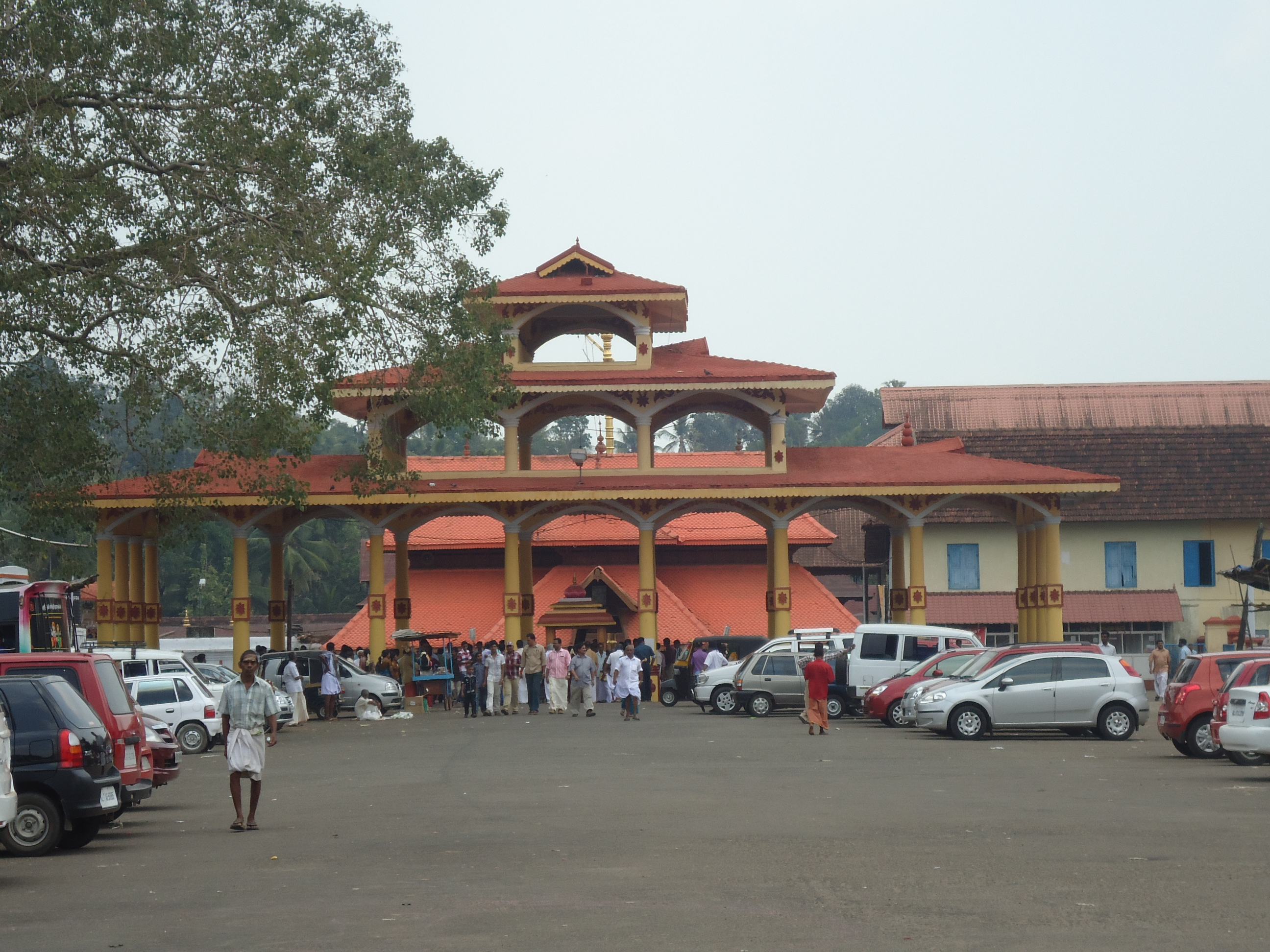
Temple entrance

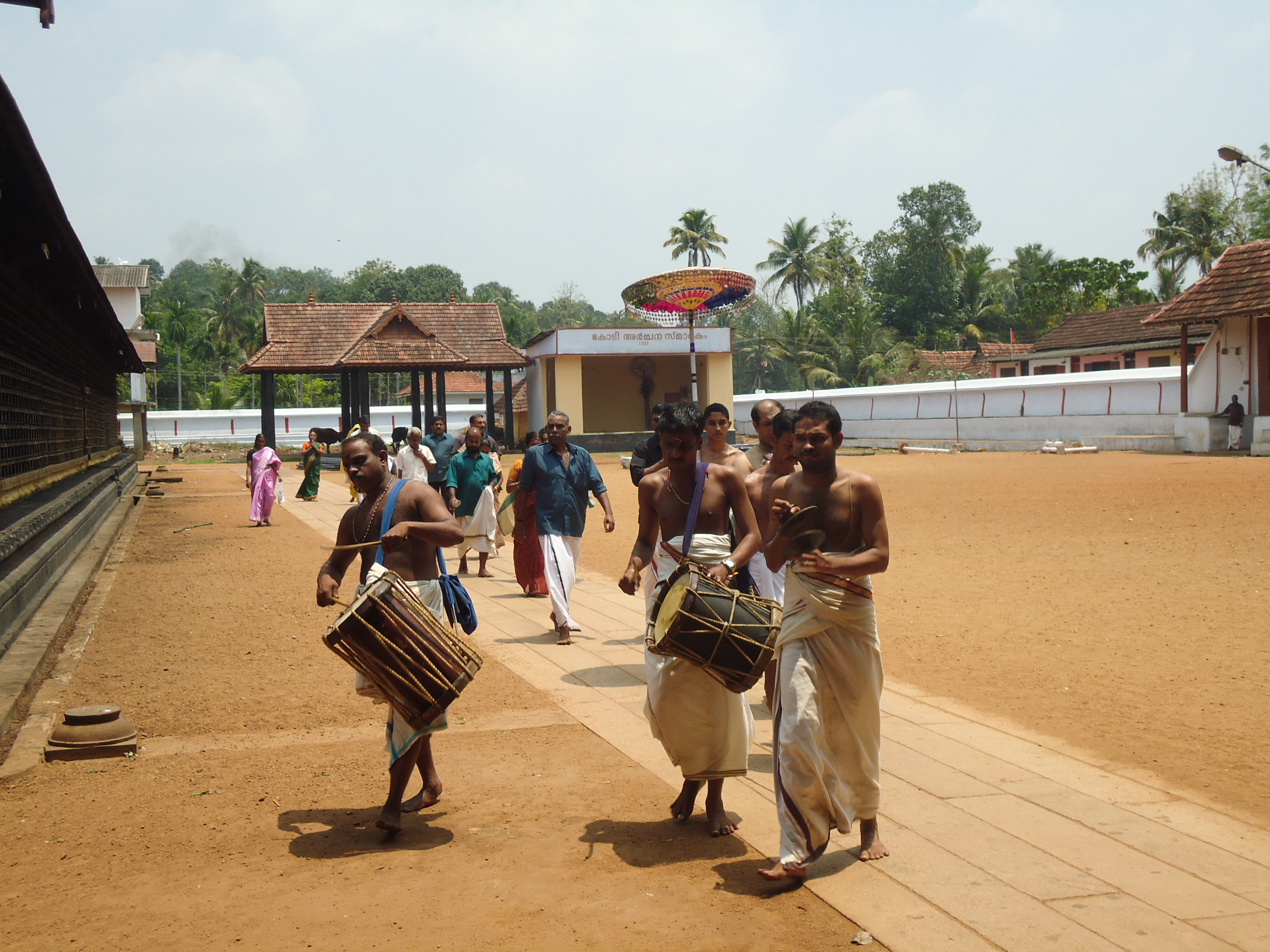
Ucha Pooja or noon prayer

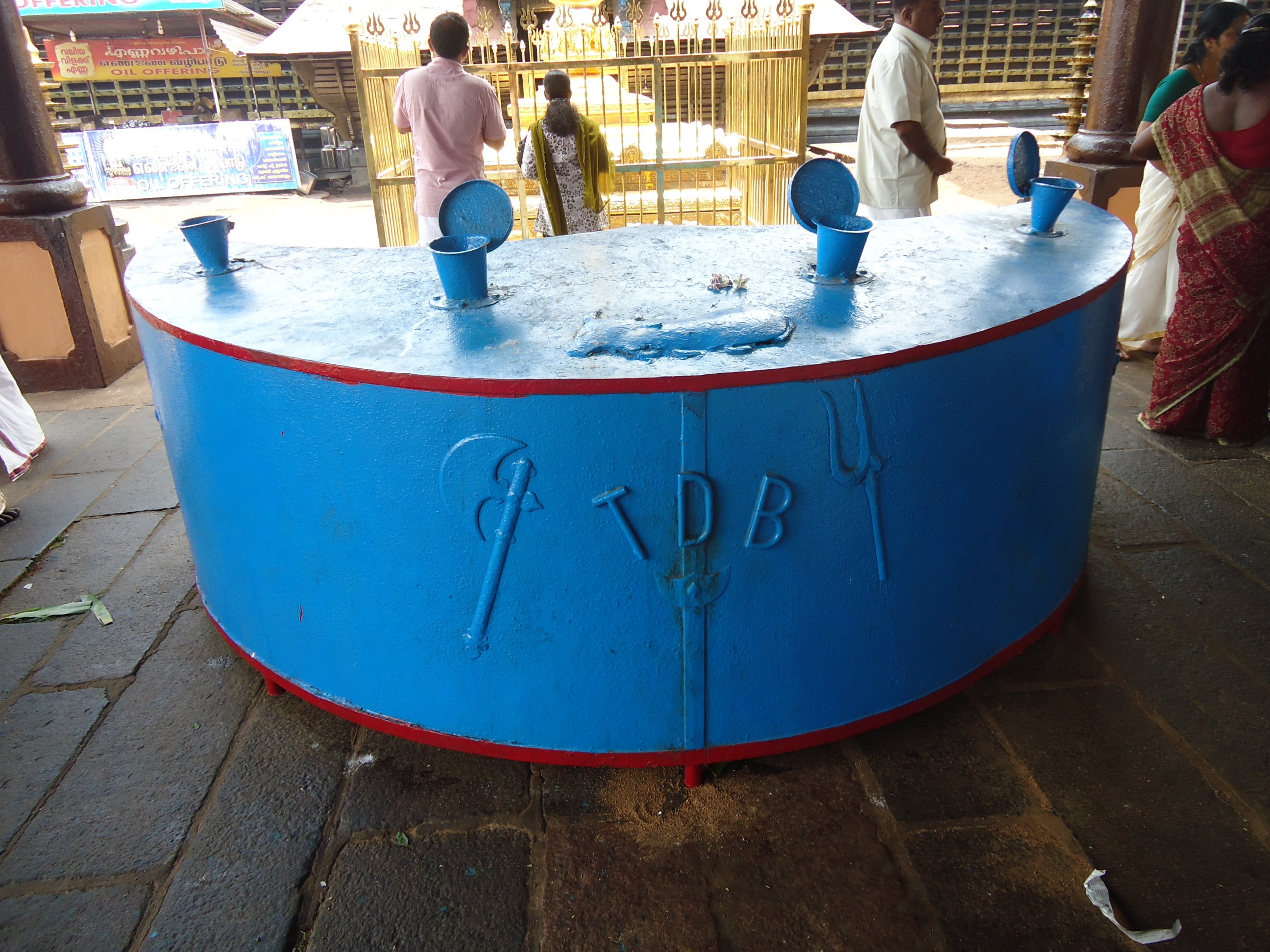
Temple Bhandaram (Donation box)
