= Arpookara =

- Village
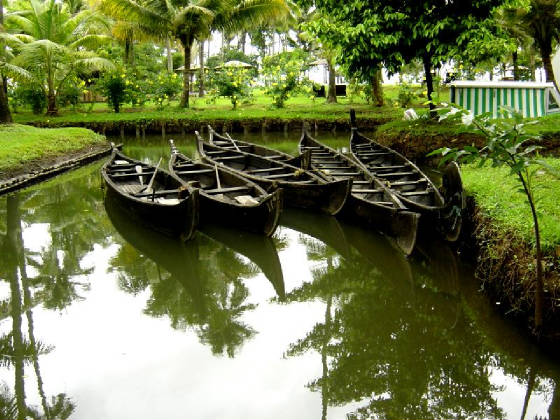
- Traditional Kerala Boats
- Interactive map of Arpookara
- Coordinates: 9.632910°N 76.480060°E
- Country: India
- State: Kerala
- District: Kottayam

Government
  - Type: Panchayath
  - Body: Arpookkara grama panchayath

Area
  - Total: 24.53 km^{2} (9.47 sq mi)

Population (2011)
  - Total: 23,366
  - Density: 952.5/km^{2} (2,467/sq mi)

Languages
- Time zone: UTC+5:30 (IST)
- PIN: 686008
- Telephone code: 0481
- Vehicle registration: KL-05
- Literacy: 95%

Arpookara/Arpookkara (Malayalam: ആർപ്പൂക്കര) is a rural village in Kottayam district in the state of Kerala, India. The saint Alphonsa of the Immaculate Conception was born in Arpookara on 1910. This village belongs to the Kuttanad region of Kerala.

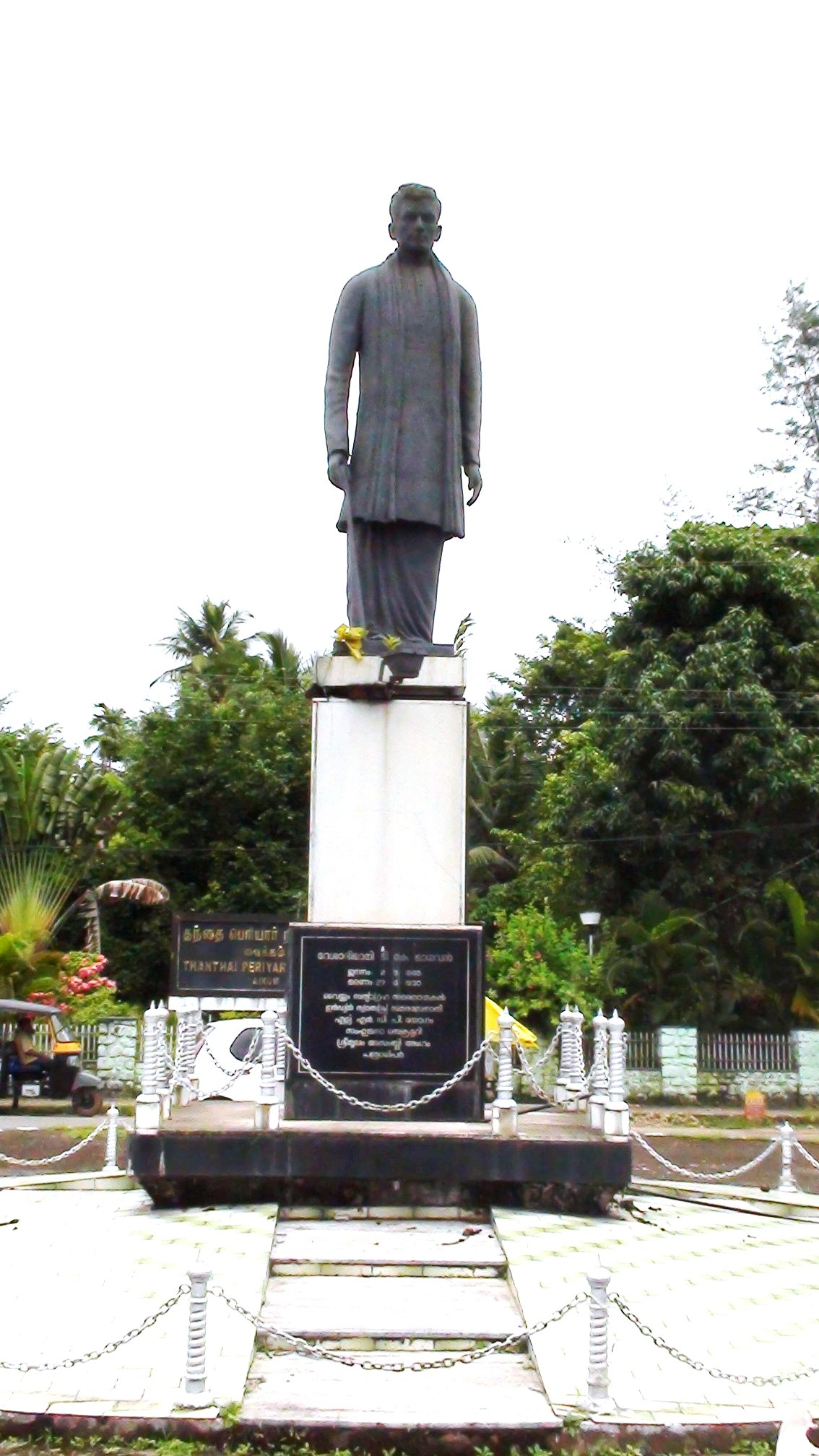
Madhavan Statue

The Kottayam Medical College is situated in Arpookara. The main attraction is the backwaters in Arpookara. There are beautiful lakes and paddy fields.

== Etymology ==
The meaning of Arpookara relates to a place where sports are played. Its proximity to the Vembanad Lake and Kumarakom makes Arpookara one of the main tourist attractions in Kerala.

== Demographics ==
As of 2011 India census, Arpookara had a population of 23,366 with 11,552 males and 11,814 females.

== Governance ==
Arpookara is administered by an Indian village governance system called Grama Panchayat.

== Landmarks ==
1. Medical College Hospital, Gandhinagar
2. Medical College Vocational Higher Secondary School, Ambalakkavala
3. Medical College Higher Secondary School, Ambalakkavala
4. St. Philomina's Girls High School, Villoonni
5. Government High School, Karippoothettu
6. Adarsam Library, Nerekadavu, Arpookkara, Kottayam
7. Navodaya Grandhasala, Karippoothettu, Arpookkara, Kottayam
8. Pranavam Group Arts and Sports Club, Near Kolettu Temple Jn. Panampalam, Arpookkara, Kottayam-8
9. School of Medical Education, Gandhinagar
10. Kuttanad Irrigation Development Sub Division, Arpookara.

=== Places of Worships ===
1. Sree Subrahmonya Swami Kshethram, Ambalakkavala, Arpookkara, Kottayam
2. Kolettu Sree Shanmugha Vilasam Temple, Panampalam, Arpookkara, Kottayam
3. Choorakavu Devi Temple & Karipoothrikka Sreekrishna Temple, Thommankavala, Arpookkara, Kottayam
4. Kunnathrikka Mahadeva Kshethram, Arpookkara, Kottayam
5. St. Xaviers church Villooni Arpookara
6. St. Micheles Chapel Panampalam, Arpookkara, Kottayam
7. St.George Orthodox Church (Manalel palli) Arpookara, Kottyam
8. St. George Church Aykkarachira, Arpookkara, Kottayam
9. Saint Alphonsa's (Muttathupadom) Birthplace, Arpookkara, Kottayam
10. Little Flower Church (Cherupushpam Palli), Arpookkara, Kottayam
11. Sreenarayana Gurudeva Kshethram SNDP Br. 3502, Arpookara (N), Kottayam
12. St. Sebastian's Church, Angadi (Angadi Palli), Arpookkara, Kottayam
13. St. Peters C.S.I Church Arpookara (Kumaramkunnu) Kottayam
