= Ettumanoor Mahadevar Temple =

Hindu temple in Kerala

Ettumanoor Sree Mahadevan Temple
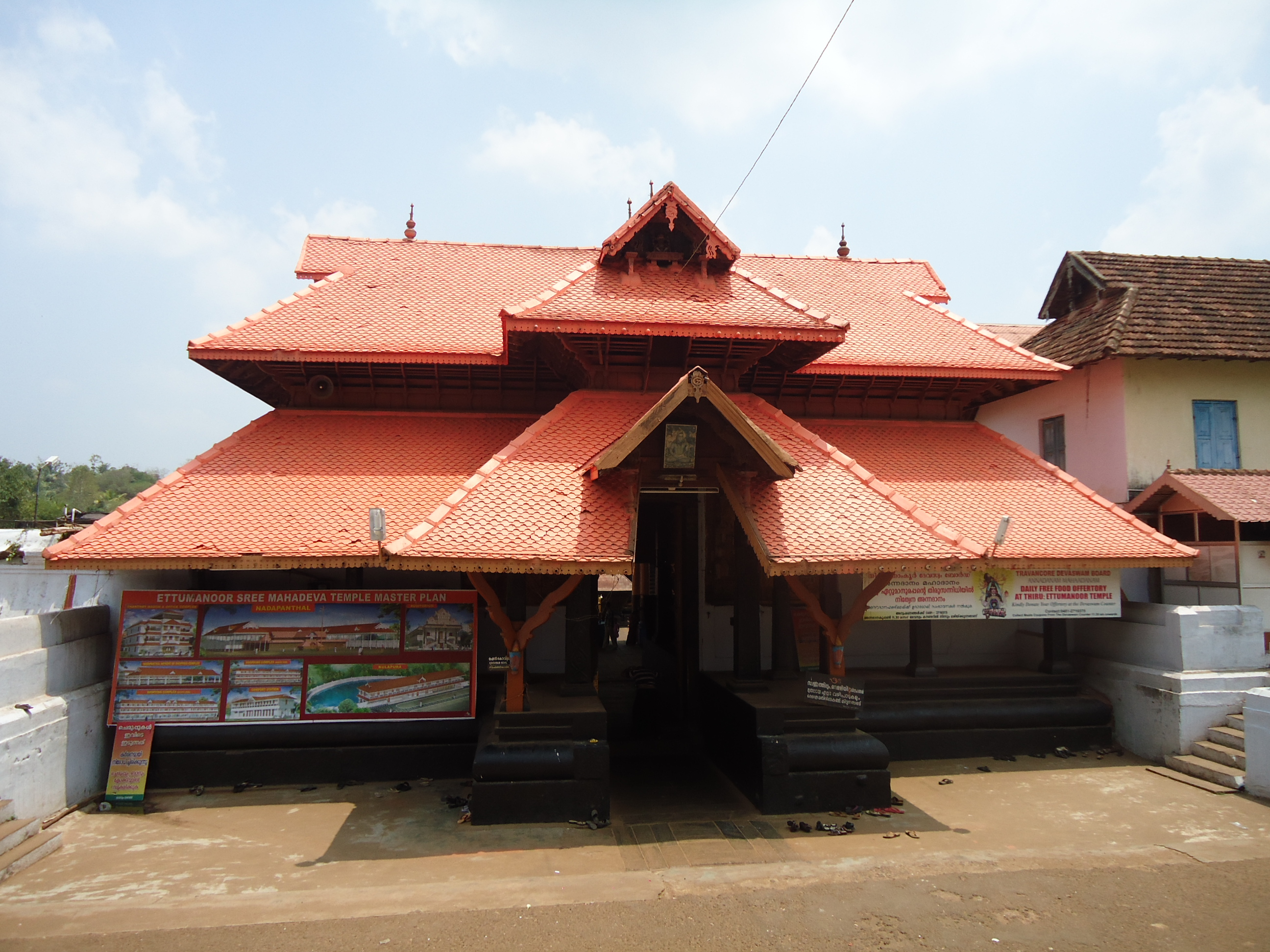
- Front view of the temple

- Mahadeva Temple, Ettumanoor, Kottayam, India

Religion
- Affiliation: Hinduism
- District: Kottayam
- Deity: Shiva as Ettumanoorappan
- Festival: Thiru ulsavam in Kumbham
- Governing body: Travancore Devaswom Board

Location
- Location: Ettumanoor
- State: Kerala
- Country: India
- Coordinates: 9°40′25.5″N 76°33′40.3″E

Architecture
- Type: Traditional Kerala style
- Completed: 1542 CE

Specifications
- Temple: One
- Elevation: 34.98 m (115 ft)

Website
- ettumanoortemple.in

Ettumanoor Mahadeva temple is an ancient Shiva temple in Kottayam, Kerala, India. The temple is one of the major Shiva temples in Kerala, along with Vaikom Temple, Kaduthruthy Mahadeva Temple, Chengannur Mahadeva Temple, Vazhappally Maha Siva Temple, Ernakulam Shiva Temple, Vadakkunathan temple, and Sreekanteswaram Mahadeva Temple, Thiruvananthapuram.

The place's name had its mythological origin from the word 'man oor' in Malayalam, which means the place of deer, as 'maan' means deer and 'oor' means place. Another version is that the name originated from the 'Ettu Mana Ooru', that is, 'The Land of Eight Namboothiri Manas' or 'Ashta Grihas'. These Eight Manas (Brahmin families) are the original Ooralans of the great Ettumanoor Mahadeva Temple. It is also believed that at this place (ooru) Lord Siva appeared in eight (Ettu) different forms (maanam) and hence the name Ettumanoor. Temple tradition is that the Pandavas and the sage Vyasa had worshipped at this temple.

== The Temple ==
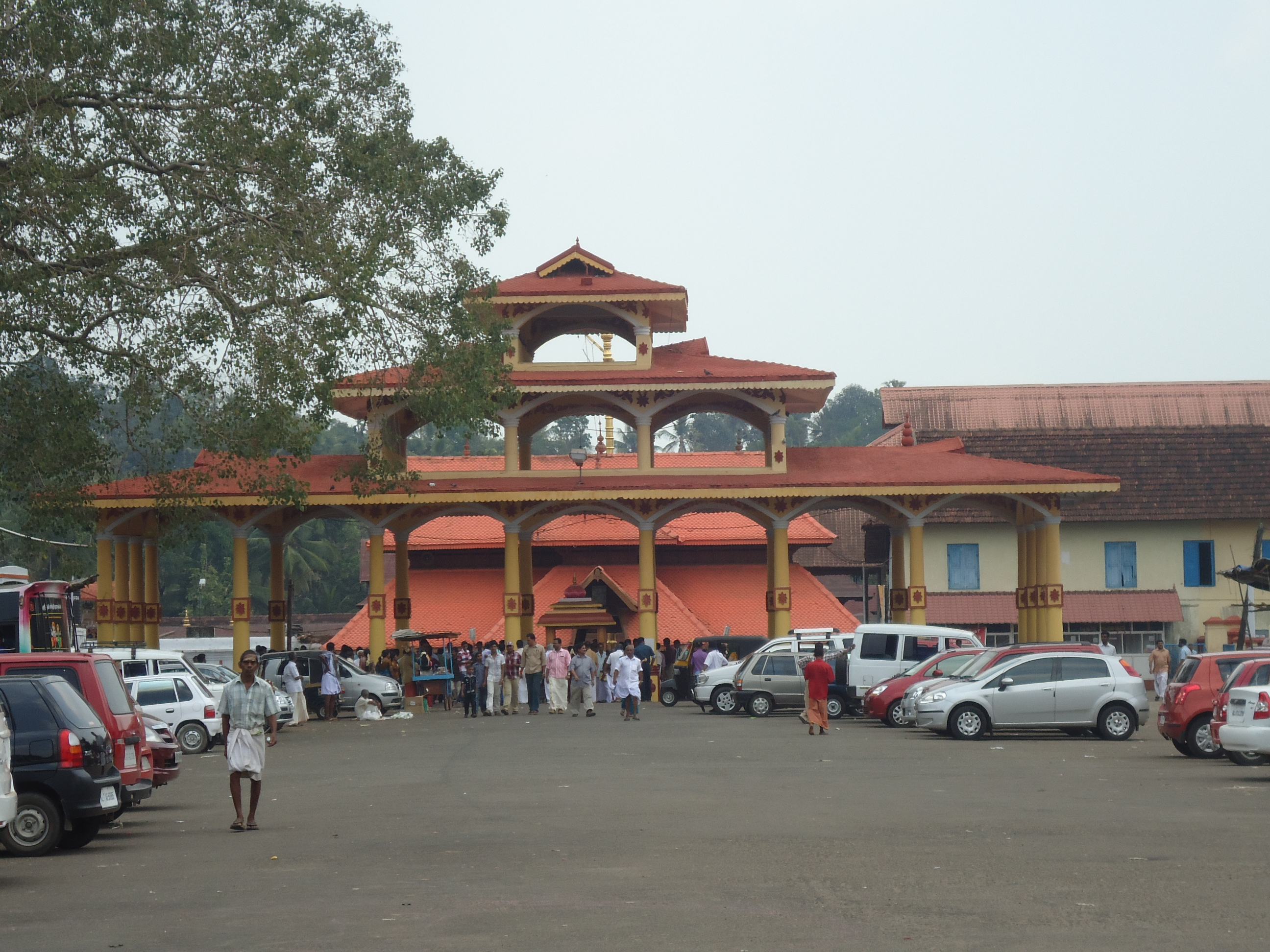
padinjare nada (Western entrance) of the temple

The present temple building, with its gopuram and the fortress around it, was reconstructed in 717 ME (1542 CE). Dravidian mural paintings are on the walls inside and outside the main entrance. The fresco of Pradosha Nritham (Dance of Shiva) is one of the finest wall paintings in India. A golden flagstaff is inside the temple, topped with an idol of a bull surrounded by small bells and metal banyan tree leaves. In terms of architecture, these temples stand out as an ultimate testament to the Vishwakarma Sthapathis for their engineering skills. The temple roofs are covered with copper sheets, and it has 14 ornamental tops. Bhagavathi, Sastha, Dakshinamoorthy, Ganapathy, and Yakshi are installed here as subordinate deities. There is a separate temple for Lord Krishna. It is believed that the philosopher Adi Sankaracharya wrote 'Soundarya Lahari' while staying in the temple.

The name Ettumanoorappan originated in Kattampakk, a small village in Kottayam district.

== Festival ==
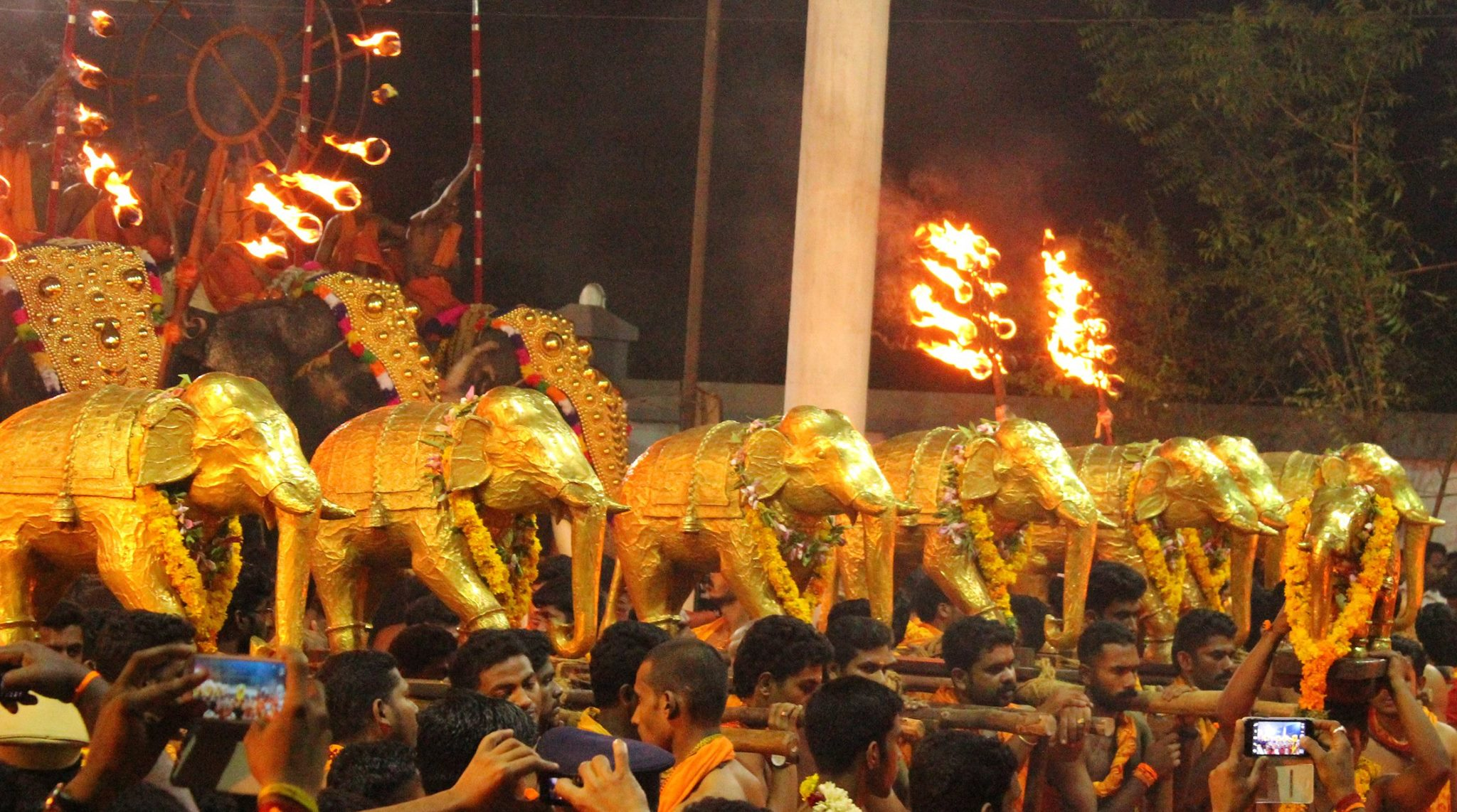
The famed Ezhara Ponnana festival

Ettumanoor Mahadeva Temple hosts the arattu festival, celebrated on a grand scale on the Thiruvathira day in February–March each year. Many people come to the temple on the 8th and 10th day of the festival, when seven and a half elephants (in Malayalam: ezharaponnaana) made of gold (nearly 13 kg) will be held in public view. This statue was donated to the temple by a travancore maharaja. The temple, one of the wealthiest Devaswoms in Kerala, has many valuable possessions.

The Thulabharam is one of the important rituals of this temple. People make offerings to God for favors received. On balance, the child or man for whom offerings were promised to God is weighed against offerings ranging from gold to fruits.

== Ezharaponnana ==
Ezhara Ponnana refers to the seven large-sized and one small-sized golden elephant (called Ezharaponnana), all of which are kept in the temple vault and taken out once a year for darshan by the devotees. Of the eight statuettes, seven have a height of two ft., and the eighth one is half that size, hence the name Ezhara (seven-and-a-half) Ponnana (Golden elephants). According to legend, they were presented to the temple by Anizham Thirunal Marthanda Varma, the founder of the Travancore kingdom. According to another story, while Marthanda Varma had pledged to present the ‘ponnana’ to Vaikathappan. The soldiers stopped in Ettumanoor temple to take rest on their way to Vaikom Mahadeva Temple. Next morning when they opened their eyes they saw Snakes in each "Ponnana". They called an astrolger and they got to know that Ettumanoorappan liked The Ezhara Ponnana and it should remain there. There are also differing stories about the reason for the offering: some believe it was offered as a penalty for the damages suffered by the temple during the annexation of Thekkumcore by Travancore; others believe it was the offering made when the marauding army of the Tipu Sultan was hammering on the gates of Travancore. The statuettes are made of a jackfruit tree and covered in gold plates weighing nearly 13 kg.

The Ezhara Ponnana Darshan is one of the high points of the temple festival, held at midnight on the eighth day of the ten-day festival. Ezhara Ponnana Darshan begins with the ceremonial procession of the eight golden elephant statuettes. The devotees later keep them at the Asthana Mandapam for the annual darshan.

== Geography ==
Ettumanoor Mahadevar Temple is located between the Ernakulam district and the Kottayam district. It is 54 km from Ernakulam and 12 km from Kottayam. The nearest towns to the temple are Kidangoor, Pala, and Kaduthuruty.

== See also ==
- 108 Shiva Temples
- Ettumanoor
- Temples of Kerala
- Vaikom Sree Mahadeva Temple
