= Kumaranalloor =

- Suburb
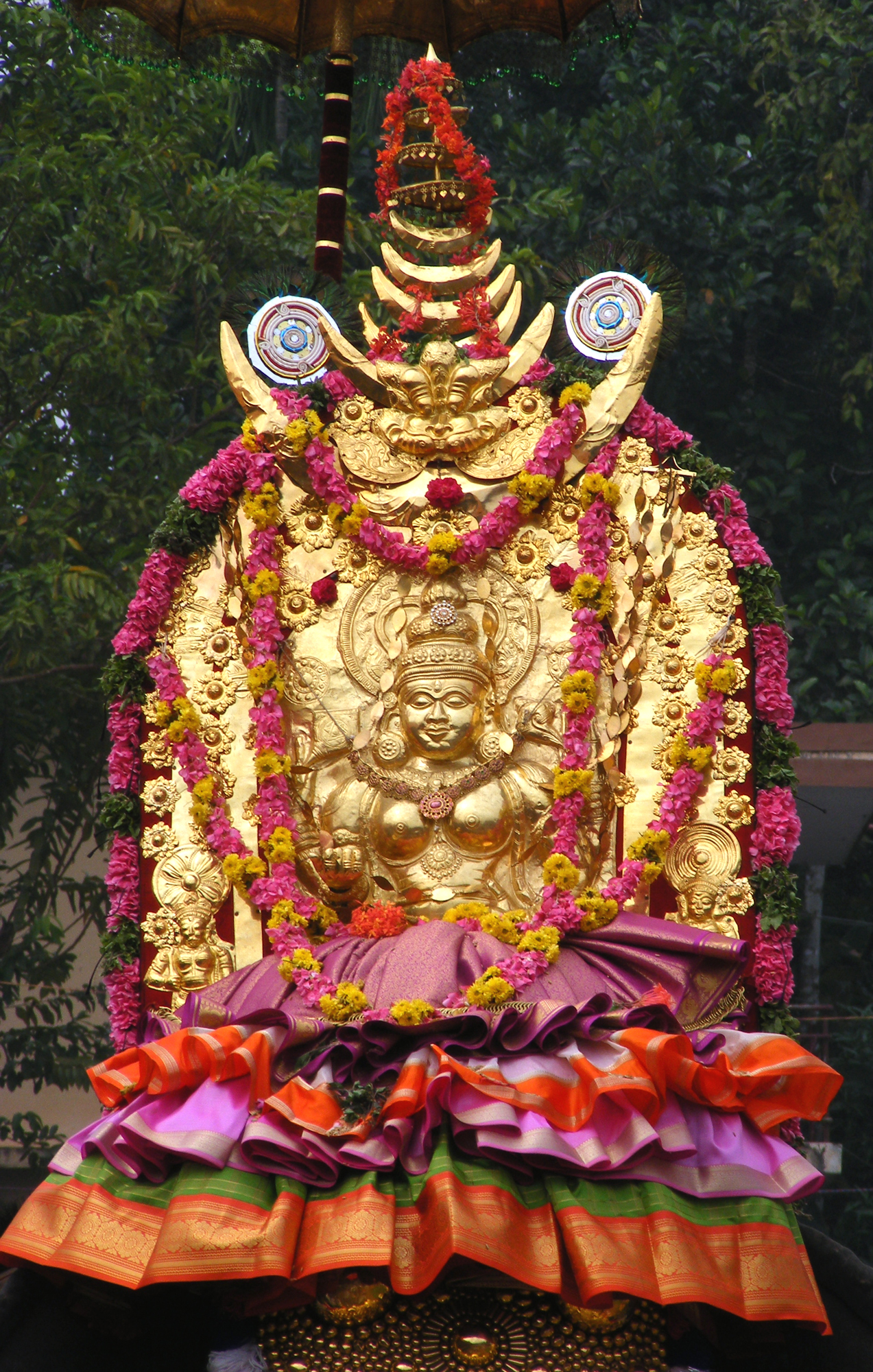
- Kumaranalloor Bhagavathy
- Interactive map of Kumaranalloor
- Coordinates: 9.6185°N 76.5310°E
- Country: India
- State: Kerala
- District: Kottayam

Area
  - Total: 13 km^{2} (5.0 sq mi)

Population
  - Total: 42,481
  - Density: 3,300/km^{2} (8,500/sq mi)

Languages
  - Official: Malayalam, English
- Time zone: UTC+5:30 (IST)
- PIN: 686016
- Telephone code: 0481
- Vehicle registration: KL-05
- Nearest city: Kottayam
- Sex ratio: 1000:1016 ♂/♀

Kumaranalloor is a suburb of Kottayam city, Kottayam taluk, Kerala, India. Kottayam city is just 5 km south of Kumaranalloor. The region was administered by the Kumaranallur grama panchayath till 2010, before the local self-governing body was merged into the Kottayam municipality. The former Panchayath office now exists as the regional administrative office for the municipality. The village is situated on the banks of Meenachil River.

== History ==
Kumaranalloor is an ancient cultural center. The Town is famous for Kumaranalloor Devi (Goddess) Temple and during the annual Trikarthika festival of the temple. This place was known as ‘Thingalkkadu', before the temple came into existence. Later the name ‘thingalkkadu' changed and came to be known as ‘Indu Kananam'. In some ancient scripts, the temple is described and known as mahishari kovil (temple).

== Kumaranalloor Temple ==
Kumaranalloor Devi Temple is considered as one of the most important Devi temples among the 108 Durgalayas (Devi temples) in Kerala. The temple is said to be more than 2400 years old, as per historical and mythological evidences as well as other sources of information. The architecture of the temple is notable for the unique structure of the nalambalam and sreekovil both of which have been built in the sreechakra style (ring like object with a handle, which is placed in the right hand of the Devi). This kind of architecture is rarely found in temple architecture.

The carnatic krithi 'Sri Kumara Nagaralaye' is a popular kshethrakrithi (composition about the deity of a particular temple) of Maharaja Swathi Thirunal set in Atana Raga and Adi Thalam, and many legends including Semmangudi Srinivasa Iyer, M S Subbulakshmi etc. popularized it.

Kumaranalloor Devi Temple is managed by Kumaranalloor Ooranma Devaswom that consists of nine Ooranma Illam's. Edanattu Illam, Choorakkad Illam, Chengazhimattam Illam, Kanjirakkattu Illam, Keeranthitta Illam, Vadakkumyal Illam, Elavannattu Illam, Elayidom Illam, Thannikkattu Illam are the nine Ooranma Illams. There are other keezhoottu temples under this Devaswom in different areas. Manjoor Bhagavathy Temple, Chengalam Bhagavathy Temple, Arthyakulam Devi Temple, Edamana Sreekrishnaswamy temple, Chennoth Sastha Temple, etc. Kumaranalloor Ooranma Devaswom manages the Devi Vilasom Higher Secondary School & Sevadhi Museum & Indological Research Institute in Kumaranalloor.

== Cheraman Perumal ==
Cheraman Perumal was the ruling emperor of Kerala when the construction of a temple at Udayanapuram near Vaikom to install the idol of goddess Durga began; while he commenced the construction of another temple at a place (which is later known as kumaranalloor) to install the idol of lord Kumara or Subramanian. Meanwhile, a disturbing incident took place at Meenakshi temple, Madurai in Tamil Nadu. The gem-studded nose ring of Devi was stolen or went missing. The king ordered an enquiry. At the same time, he ordered to kill the priest of the temple unless he could solve this problem within 41 days. Because, the nose ring would not be misplaced without his knowledge. However, the priest was innocent. He was confused and perplexed in this dilemma. He took refuge at the feet of Devi.

== Forty Days ==
As days and weeks progressed, the grief-stricken priest spent his days and nights crying and praying. On the night of the 40th day, he slept at the doorsteps of temple, meditating and contemplating his fate that his life would reach an end on the next day. However, he had a dream that night. Devi appeared before him and ordered him to quit the place at once. The perplexed and bewildered priest winked his eyes. He had seen a thejas (divine light) moving forward. He followed it without being aware of where he was going. The thejas led him a long distance and finally reached the place which latter became known as Kumaranalloor. At Kumaranalloor, the temple was under construction to install the idol of lord Subramanian or Kumaran.

== Sanctum Sanctorum ==
The thejas entered into the sreekovil (sanctum sanctorum) of the temple. Moreover, it was at the prathista time (suitable time of installation) that the thejas entered the sreekovil. Then there was an asareeri (an incorporeal and divine voice), ‘kumaran alla ooril'{Malayalam}, meaning, ‘this place is not for kumara'. This is, kumari's or devi's place. Hence it got the name Kumaranalloor. Perumal was disappointed and frustrated. He travelled to Udayanapuram to install the idol of Kumara, at the temple, which was under construction. On the way, Perumal encountered some obstacles but finally managed to reach Udayanapuram and install the idol of Subramanian at the sreekovil of the temple.

== Back with the Idol ==
Later, Perumal returned to Kumaranalloor with the devi's idol and began the preparation for installing it there. Yet another thought struck him that the idol has to be changed. There was an idol lying in water at vedagiri a nearby place. Perumal brought the idol from vedagiri. Maharshi Parasurama had supposedly made and worshipped the idol in past. At the time of installation, a Brahmin sage with matted hair, came and entered the sreekovil and installed the idol in a second. As soon as the installation of idol was done he vanished. To this date people believe that the Brahmin sage was Maharshi Parasurama. The Brahmin priest, who followed the thejas from Madurai, became the priest of the temple. His residence is known as Madurai illam. His successors worship the Devi even today.

=== Architecture ===
The temple is situated in area of 15,000 square metres. The main gopuram (entrance) of the temple faces towards the east direction, and high walls surrounding the temple with other three gopurams (entrance) in each direction (south, west & north).

While entering the temple, the temple view presents a divine picture. Getting into the temple through the main gopuram one can see the golden dhwajom (flag staff) and the balickal pura with carvings of many sculptures including those of Ganapathy and Shiva and other saints on pillars. Inside the nalambalam, sreekovil and the main mandapam are surrounded by paths made of carved stones. The temple of Shiva is on the right side of the main sreekovil. Bhadrakali temple is situated on the south of the temple along with the full stretched surrounding path on carved stones for the whole temple.

=== Murals ===
Murals in Kumaranalloor temple are precious and rare. The outer walls of the sanctum sanctorum (sreekovil) are decorated with wall painting of hindu gods, goddesses, and incidents from great epics Ramayana and Mahabharata. Natural colours and medicinal plants were used to colour these frescos.

=== Kumaranalloor Thrikkarthika Utsavam ===
The important festival of the temple is Thrikkarthika celebrated in the month of Vrischikam (November–December). On the Karthika day it is usual to make a nivedyam (offering) in the precincts of the Udayanapuram and Thrissur Vadakkunnatha temples. The story goes that the Gods in these two temples, greatly charmed by the beauty of the Devi returning after her Karthika bath. They came out of the temples, got over the compound walls, and stood there looking amorously at the seductive figure of the passing Devi, and the temple priest who ran helterskelter in search of the Gods, finally met them on the walls at the southern end of the temples. Thenceforth, during Karthika, puja is performed over the walls of these temples. The display of lights in the evening, called Karthika Vilakku, is the highlight of this celebration.

The temple also manages some Educational Institutions which are:

1. Devi Vilasam LP School
2. Devi Vilasam UP School
3. Devi Vilasam High School
4. Devi Vilasam Vocational HS School (Specialisation in Medical Laboratory Technology and Computer Application)
5. Devi Vilasam Public School (English Medium up to 7th standard)

=== A Century old History of the School ===
In the year ME 1081 (AD 1905), the School Inspector (Northern Range) Sri M Raja Raja Verma visited the temple and was honoured. He saw many young Namboothiri boys who were not english educated and offered to establish a special school for them. Sri CN Thuppan Namboothiri, the then Administrator of the temple were entrusted with the task. As per his instructions and supervision, with 12 students, on the Vidya Arambham day, the school was established. Sri Kumanam K Govinda Pillai, who was present on the occasion, served in the school for 6 months. Sri Kakkanattu Padmanabha Pillai, Thiruvatta Govinda Warrior and such eminent personalities also served in the school. Within 6 months, Rs 19 was allocated as grant and the balance had to be collected from various sources.

The first Anniversary Meeting was held in the month of Kumbham in ME 1083. School Inspector Sri R Eswara Pillai presided over the meeting and suggested many ideas for the development of the school. But, the school could not function for a long time. Later when Sri CN Thuppan Namboothiri became the Member of Legislative Council (MLC), based on the memorandum submitted, the school was again reopened with up to 7th Standard. Since the school did not have its own building, after collecting donations from Namboothiri's the present big building was established.

The new school building was inaugurated by the then Diwan of Sri Travancore Mannath Krishnan Nair. Dr. Gill, was a special invitee to the meeting and made a felicitation on the occasion. There was a boarding facility also for Namboothiri boys from other places. A Government Grant was sanctioned (Rs. 500) for the boarding facilities. The extra money required for the building, was collected through donations.

This school functioned for 4 years. Afterwards, Diwan Raghavaiya visited the school and as per his directions, converted the school into an English medium school. Due to financial difficulties, the school had to close down again for some time. Later, as per the directions of Maharaja of Travancore, the school was converted into a Sanskrit school for the development of which people and devaswom started supporting. Later the school had been open to all as an academic school. Sri CN Thuppan Namboothiri was appointed as the Manager (for lifetime) of the school, but later resigned from the post. The children of this locality started to get the benefit of this school. Moreover, donations were received from many sources, and among them NSS College requires special mentioning. The (Kumaranalloor Uranma) Devaswom had to spend more than it could actually afford for the noble cause of this school.

Some of the facilities provided in the Schools are:

- Arts and cultural training
- Sports and Games
- Bharat Scouts and Guides
