= Sister Abhaya murder case =

1992 death in India

Sister Abhaya
- Sr Abhaya in 1991

Personal life
- Born: Beena Thomas; 26 February 1971 Kottayam, Kerala, India
- Died: 27 March 1992 (aged 21) Kottayam, Kerala, India
- Cause of death: Murder/Suicide.
- Citizenship: Indian
- Occupation: Nun

Religious life
- Religion: Christian - Knanaya Catholic

Sister Abhaya (born Beena Thomas; 26 February 1971 – 27 March 1992), a Knanaya Catholic sister, was found dead in a well filled with water in St Pius X Convent in Kottayam, India on 27 March 1992. Investigation into this death is by far the longest running murder investigation in the Kerala.

Abhaya was a member of St. Joseph's Congregation for religious sisters under the Knanaya Catholic Archeparchy of Kottayam, a Knanaya metropolitan archeparchy of the Syro-Malabar Church in Kerala. The Kerala Police which investigated the case initially closed it with a theory of suicide. A case of unnatural death was registered based on a statement given by Sister Leissue, Mother Superior of the Convent. On 13 April, the Crime Branch wing of state police took over the probe, and, on 30 January 1993, submitted a final report which tried to strengthen the suicide theory, with claims of psychological illness of the deceased. Following popular pressure and a legal battle launched by Jomon Puthenpurackal, a human-rights activist who established and led the "Sister Abhaya Case Action Council," the Kerala High Court transferred the investigation to the Central Bureau of Investigation in 1993. The first team CBI failed to find the reason for the death. Upon the instruction of the court, a second-team was set up, which concluded that it was indeed a murder, but there was not enough evidence leading to the murderer(s). The conclusion of "homicide" was reached mainly based on the medical opinion given by three doctors, as against the opinion given by Dr C Radhakrishnan, who conducted an autopsy on the body of Abhaya. This report was also not accepted by the court.

As the court rejected the second final report, the CBI continued the probe under another officer, R R Sahay. In another final report on 25 August 2005, the CBI stated that "further investigation conducted, at the behest of the court, has not indicated involvement of any person in the death of Sister Abhaya" and a request was made that the "case be treated as closed as untraced." The court did not accept the probe and the investigation continued.

On 4 September 2008, the High Court handed over the investigation to the CBI's Kerala unit in Kochi. By then, the CBI had approached the judiciary to close the case four times for want of evidence. In early November 2008, the HC handed over the case to the state unit of CBI, and gave a three-month period to complete the probe. The new team, led by Dy SP Nandakumaran Nair, had recorded the statement of Sanju P Mathew, who had been residing next to the convent when Abhaya died. Sanju, in his statement as per Section 164 of Code of Criminal Procedure, 1973, said he had seen Kottoor in the convent hostel campus on the night of 26 March 1992, a day before Abhaya was found dead. Based on this statement, the CBI on 19 November 2008, arrested Kottoor, Puthrikkayl and Sephy. On 22 December 2020, a special CBI court in Kerala's Thiruvananthapuram delivered its verdict in the 28-year-old murder case as it held Father Thomas Kottoor and Sister Sephy guilty. They were sentenced to life imprisonment on 23 December 2020. In June 2022, both of them were granted bail and their life sentences were suspended by the High court till the disposal of their petition challenging the verdict of the trial court.

== Sequence of events ==
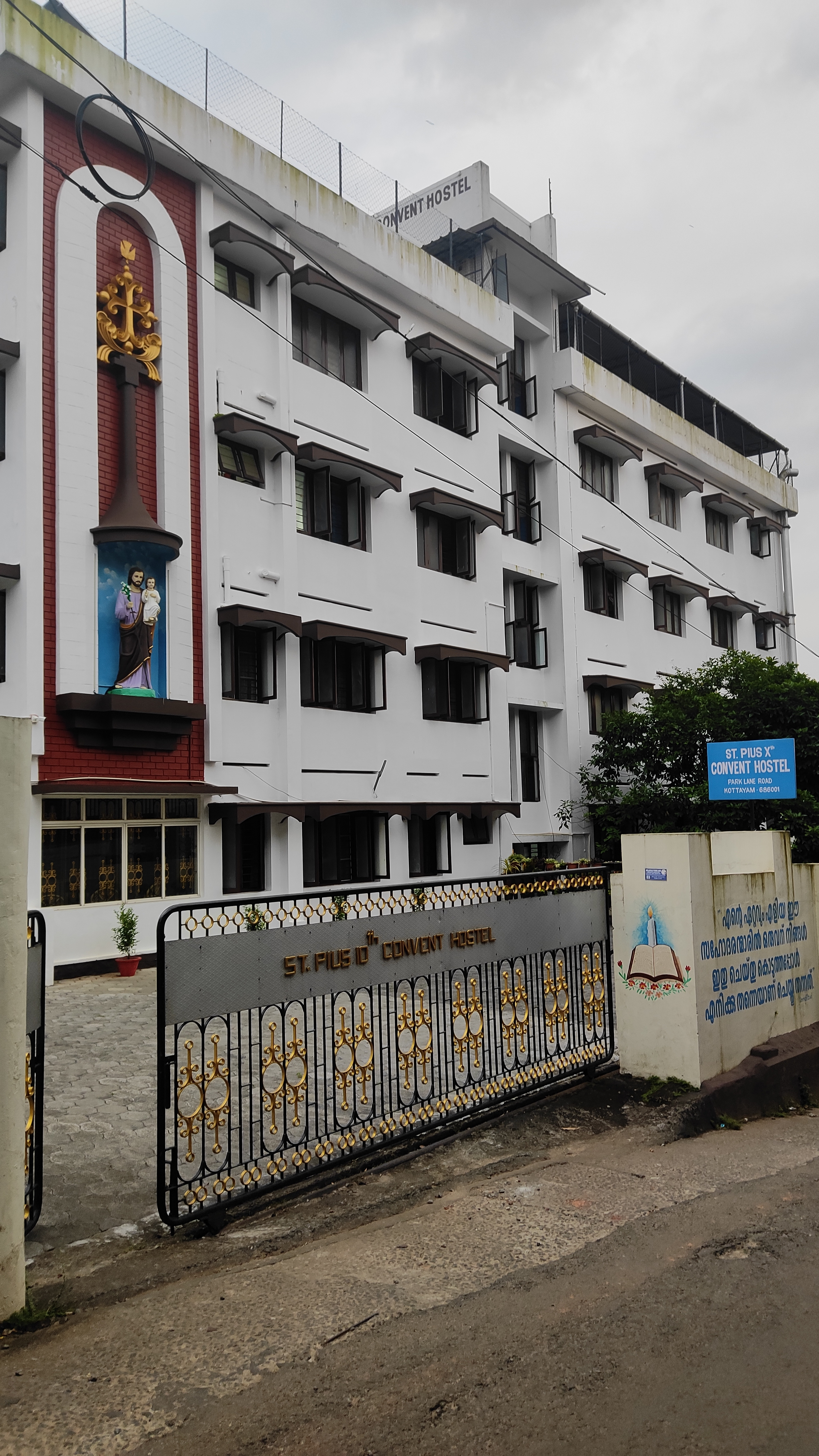
St Pius Xth Convent Hostel

Sister Abhaya was reported missing on the morning of 27 March 1992. She had woken at 4:00 am to study for exams, and was last known to have gone to the kitchen for a drink. The refrigerator door was left open, a bottle of water was spilt on the floor and a single slipper sat under the fridge – its pair was found beside the convent hostel's well. After a brief search, Sister Abhaya's body was found in the convent hostel's well in the early hours of the same day. Kottayam West Police Station upgraded their investigation to that of unnatural death. At 10:00 am the deceased was removed from the well by the fire department and an inquest was drawn up. A post-mortem conducted on the body by Dr Radhakrishnan of Government Medical College, Kottayam found abrasions on the right shoulder and hip and two small lacerations above the right ear. There was no sign of sexual assault. Despite the potentially significant injuries, the death was ruled a drowning.

The series of inquiries by various investigating bodies that followed was lengthy, convoluted and unsatisfactory, plagued by internal conflict, bitter rivalries and allegations of corruption and bias, compounded by pressure from many quarters to bring the case to conclusion. In April 1992 the Crime Branch of the CID took up the case, and months later ruled Sister Abhaya's death a suicide. However, the Crime Branch was alleged to have destroyed crucial material evidence potentially implicating homicide as a cause of death.

In April 1995, forensic medical experts Dr S K Pathak, Dr Mahesh Verma and Dr S R Singh conducted dummy experiments leading them to conclude cause of death to be homicide. Nevertheless, no arrests were made until November 2008. After years of failed investigations and internal struggles, two priests – Thomas Kottur, Jose Puthurukkayil and a nun – Sister Sephy – were arrested by the CBI under Nandan Kumar Nair on 19 November 2008. All three suspects were granted bail in early January 2009. On 17 July 2009, the three were charged with murder, defamation and destruction of evidence. Prosecutors alleged that Sister Abhaya had stumbled upon the two priests and one sister in a "compromising position" and had subsequently been attacked with an axe and dumped in the well.

After a 28-year-long investigation, on 22 December 2020, the CBI court found Fr. Kottoor and Sr. Sephy to be guilty of the murder of Sr. Abhaya. They were sentenced to life imprisonment on 23 December 2020.

== Investigations ==
=== Action council ===
An Action Council was convened by Jomon Puthenpurackal in 1992 demanding prosecution of those responsible for the murder of Abhaya.

67 nuns belonging to Abhaya's congregation petitioned the Chief Minister of Kerala to investigate the case as a homicide. On 7 April 1992, the Director general of police of Kerala directed the Crime Branch of the Kerala Police to take over the investigation from the local police. The Government of Kerala, on the basis of the petition, recommended a CBI enquiry. On 29 March 1993, CBI began a new investigation.

=== Kerala Police ===
On 27 March 1992, Kottayam West Police Station ASI V V Augustine visited the crime scene and called the fire force to search for Abhaya's body in the well in the compound. The fire force removed the body from the well. An inquest was prepared by ASI Augustine. Photographs of the body were also taken. Clothing of Abhaya was taken into custody. Later these items of physical evidence were destroyed. The post-mortem report indicated death by drowning but also reported on the possibility of homicide based on head injuries.

On 7 April 1992, the Director general of police of Kerala directed the Crime Branch section of the Kerala police to take up the investigation. The Crime Branch submitted its report before the Revenue Divisional Officer (RDO) on 30 January 1993. The Crime Branch concluded that Abhaya had committed suicide. According to the post mortem report, she had died from drowning. Though there were allegations that the Crime Branch had procured the evidence in the case from the court and destroyed it, this was subsequently disproved by the CBI.

=== CBI ===
On 29 March 1993, the FIR in the case was registered by the CBI. The CBI started investigating the death of Sister Abhaya under the direct supervision of its officer Varghese P. Thomas.

On 29 November 1996, the CBI issued the first final report. The author of the report, A.K. Ohri, stated that he could not determine whether Abhaya's death was suicide or homicide. The report was not accepted by the Chief Judicial Magistrate's Court. On 9 July 1999, the CBI issued a second final report authored by Surinder Paul. Paul concluded that Abahya's death was a homicide, but he could not establish the identity of the perpetrators. Paul's report was also not accepted by the court. On 25 August 2005, the CBI issued yet another report, authored by R.R. Sahay. Sahay concluded that there was no indication that anyone was involved in Abhaya's death. The report was again not accepted. On 4 September 2008, the court turned the investigation over to the Kerala branch of the CBI.

Some of the initial manipulations in the case by the local police and crime branch, alleged by CBI are:
-The inquest report did not indicate the homicidal injuries on the body of Abhaya.
-The material evidence in the case was destroyed and the clothes were not subject to forensic examination
-The photographs showing injuries on the body were removed.
-The crime scene was tampered with or material physical evidence was not collected from the crime scene.
During the initial inquiry, the post-mortem, chemical examination and laboratory report also had been erased and then rewritten due to other influence.

On 30 December 1993, Varghese P. Thomas resigned from the service of CBI and from the investigation of Abhaya's death. He had seven more years in service to retire. He had arrived at the conclusion that Abhaya's death was a case of murder and he had recorded it as such in the Case Diary. Subsequently, on 19 January 1994, he called a special press conference in Kochi and announced that he had resigned from CBI as his conscience did not permit him to comply with a strong directive given by his superior officer, V. Thyagarajan, the then Superintendent of CBI Kochi Unit, who had asked Varghese P. Thomas to record the death of Abhaya as suicide in the Case Diary. With this press conference, the case of Sr. Abhaya caught media attention all over India and the matter was strongly debated in the Parliament of India as well as in the Kerala Legislative Assembly on several occasions.

=== Writ Petition to Kerala High Court ===
The Action Council filed another Writ petition in the Kerala High Court asking the court to remove V. Thyagarajan from Cochin Unit of the CBI as well as from the investigation. Further on 3 June 1994 all the MP's from Kerala jointly submitted a passionate petition to K. Vijayarama Rao, the Director of the CBI requesting him to disallow Thyagarajan to continue in the Abhaya's murder case. As a result, M.L. Sharma, the Joint Director of the CBI, was given charge of the investigation into Abhaya's death.

== Cause of death ==
Dr C Radhakrishnan, the forensic surgeon and former Principal of Government Medical College, Kottayam, who conducted the post-mortem on the body of the deceased Abhaya, had given the report as death by drowning. He later made a statement before the Magistrate on 1 January 2009. The crime branch did not allow him to visit the crime scene to form a definite opinion as to the cause of death. The explanation of the crime branch is that the case had been handed over to the state forensic chief Dr.B.Umadathan. Dr. Radhakrishnan noted six homicidal injuries on the body of the deceased.

Sr. Abhaya had the following ante-mortem injuries as per the post-mortem certificate issued by Dr. Radhakrishnan:

1. Lacerated wound 1.8x0.5x0.2 cm., oblique, on the right side of the back of head, the upper end being 3 cm above end 3 cm behind the top of ear.

2. Lacerated wound 1.5x0.5x0.3 cm, oblique, on the head 2.5 cm behind injury No.1.

3. Graze abrasion 4 x 3 cm., oblique on the right side of the back of trunk, 9 cm below the lower end of shoulder blade with an upward and inward direction.

4. Abrasion 1.5x1 cm., 2 cm below injury No.3.

5. Multiple graze abrasions over an area 12 x 6 cm on the outer aspect of right buttock, the upper border being 4 cm below iliac crest. The direction of the grazes were upwards and inwards.

6. On dissection the scalp tissues over an area 2 x2 cm on middle of the top of head were found contused. The scalp tissues over an area 7 x 5 cm around injuries Nos.1 and 2 were also found contused.

The skull was intact. Brain showed localised sub-arachnoid haemorrhage underneath these contused regions. No sign of increased intra-cranial tension."

=== CBI's dummy test ===
On 7 April 1995, using a full-sized dummy of Sister Abhaya, the CBI made some experimental tests in the well where her corpse was found. Based on the post mortem report, On 17 April 1995 Dr. S.K. Pathak, the chief of the Forensic Department of Sawai Man Singh Medical College, Jaipur and Dr. Mahesh Varma, former chairperson of Anatomy Section submitted their formal expert report to the CBI investigation team to the effect that homicide could not be ruled out. Subsequently, the CBI declared that the killers would soon be arrested.

=== Protests ===
After the dummy test, no arrests were made. The Action Council staged a protest in front of the CBI office at Kochi on 27 November 1995. Later, on 18 March 1996, another big rally was organised under the leadership of former Chief Minister of Kerala, E. K. Nayanar, in front of the Secretary of state at Thiruvananthapuram. Again, on 1 July 1996, the Action Council filed a petition in the High Court challenging the inaction of the CBI. On 20 August 1996, the High Court directed the CBI to complete its investigation in three months. In the meantime, the CBI advertised an award of ₹3 lakh (equivalent to ₹18 lakh or US$19,000 in 2026) to anyone who could give dependable evidence in the case.

On 12 October 1996, all the MPs from Kerala visited the Prime Minister and pleaded with him to expedite the CBI investigation. However, on 6 December 1996 the CBI filed a petition in the Chief Judicial Magistrate's court Ernakulam seeking to wind up its investigation in the matter for lack of evidence. The court rejected the request and directed the CBI to continue the investigation.

=== Court criticizing CBI ===
The Chief Judicial Magistrate (CJM) directed the CBI in its order dated 20 March 1997 to re-investigate the case. The court in its order strongly criticized the CBI for its loyalty and complicity to certain vested interests to defeat the ends of justice and the court observed that the CBI had not made party some very significant persons who otherwise emerged in the facts of the case quite evidently. The court also asserted its belief that the case could have easily been established had there been an honest and proper investigation. Further the court after seeing the video cassette of an Asianet interview, mentioned K.T. Michael by name for "influencing" the course of the investigation. This remark was later expunged by the High Court, after considering the reasons for the statements made during the interview. The CJM court observed that certain "invisible hands" were still trying to scuttle the Sister Abhaya murder case observing that these forces were trying to influence the investigating agencies and the government officials.

=== High Court's new intervention ===
The Action Council, again on 30 May 1997 filed a Public Interest Litigation in the Kerala High Court against the non-compliance of the CJM's directive for re-investigation. The High Court in its order directed the CBI to report back to the court the progress it had made in the investigation in ten days from the date of the order.

Having had enough of the failure and lack of interest on the part of the CBI, the High Court directed suo moto the Director of the CBI to appoint a special team from New Delhi to investigate the matter. Thus P.D. Meena, the Superintendent of the CBI from New Delhi and his team undertook a month-long investigation and reported to the High Court. The CBI was convinced that the death of Abhaya was in fact murder. However, the CBI report said that due to lack of evidence it was not possible to go further into the matter. The High Court again on 28 September 1998 directed the CBI to file its final report of the re-investigation on or before 12 October 1998.

The magistrate court later affirmed that there was clear evidence to show that some officers who took part in the investigation conducted by the local police and Crime Branch wanted to refer this case as a case of suicide. The remarks were later expunged by the High Court.

=== Developments since 2007 ===
A report by B. Sreejan, senior reporter with the Thiruvananthapuram bureau of The New Indian Express (12 April 2007), stated that the original chemical examination report of the vaginal swab and vaginal smear of sister Sephy has been found to have been tampered with. The manuscript of the workbook report from the Chemical Examination Laboratory shows over-writing in four places. Using a whitener and a different ink, the word not has been added to the word detected. The lab explained that it was quite normal to make corrections in the manuscript. Even Varghese P Thomas, the first investigating officer, said the post mortem and lab reports had ruled out rape, leaving no scope for suspicions on the veracity of the report.

=== Narco analysis tests ===
As part of its investigation in August 2007, the CBI conducted Narcosynthesis tests on Fr. Thomas Kottoor, Fr. Jose Poothrikkayil, Sr. Sephy and some others who they believed had knowledge about the case. Narco Analysis test report and CD were sent to the Chief Judicial Magistrate Court and to the High Court.

There were allegations that the CDs relating to the narco analysis tests were manipulated. Justice Ramkumar of the Kerala High Court sent questionnaires to Dr. Malini, assistant director of the Bengaluru centre where the narco analysis was conducted. The lab denied any manipulation. But Justice Hema, who heard the bail petition of the accused, based on Case Diaries, mentioned that the narco analysis CDs might have been manipulated and wanted the originals to be produced in court. Dr. Malini has since been dismissed from service on the charge of forging her birth certificates. C-DAC Thiruvananthapuram, ordered by the Ernakulam CJM court to verify the Narco CDS submits that they are not equipped for the tests. CDs given to CDIT for tests. CDIT submits the finding that the CDs have been doctored more than 30 times. Court orders CBI to find out the original CDs. within 10 days. CBI questions the forensic lab officials including Dr. Malini. CBI makes a volte face and submits that the CDs were not edited. CDIT challenges the submission by CBI. Abhaya's father files contempt of court petition against CBI for not producing original CDs.

=== 2008 ===
On 11 January 2008, the Kerala High Court directed the CBI to produce the result of the Narco-analysis test conducted on the suspects in the case in a sealed cover before the court within two weeks. The court further directed that no third person had any right of disclosure of the content of the results till the appropriate stage, other than the High Court. In this regard, the CBI submitted it before the court on 21 January 2008. The results were submitted in a sealed cover as directed by the court.

==== Allegations regarding community leaders trying to sabotage the case ====
There was speculation that an influential Christian political leader from Central Kerala tried to sabotage the case by influencing the then INC government in the centre. Other allegations included the Catholic Church Council trying to influence the outcome of the investigations. Others also alleged that due to the constant pressure that the action council and their convener and his secret financial backers that a lot of real good leads were never followed up on or investigated.

==== Arrests ====
CBI arrested two Catholic priests, Thomas Kottur (spelled Kottoor in another publication) and Jose Puthurukkayil, and a sister, Sister Sephy, on 19 November 2008.

On 22 November 2008 Archbishop Kuriakose Kunnacherry, former head of the Archeparchy of Kottayam, was summoned for questioning. The CBI questioned Kottayam Archbishop Mathew Moolakkatt at its office in Kochi on 24 November 2008.

On 25 November 2008 V.V. Augustine, the Assistant Sub Inspector who prepared the FIR during the initial case investigation, was found dead. Police said he committed suicide by cutting the artery on his wrist and taking poison. A suicide note cited mental torture by the CBI. The CBI had alleged that Augustine had destroyed evidence and closed the case as a suicide, but the case diary revealed it was Augustine who pointed to the possibility of homicide. He had recorded that Abhaya could have seen something objectionable in the dining room and could have been silenced. In his personal diary, Augustine wrote about how he was pressured by CBI to say that senior police officers tried to influence him.

On 02 and 29 29 December 2008, the CBI made a statement before P. D. Soman, Chief Judicial Magistrate Ernakulam. According to the CBI, their Brain mapping and narco analysis investigations revealed that Abhaya woke up on 27 March 1992, early in the morning, descended the staircase and went to the hostel kitchen to get a drink of water from the refrigerator. Sephy hit Abhaya with an axe ('kodali') thrice on the back of the head. She then collapsed. Thinking that Abhaya was dead, Kottoor and Poothrikkayil, assisted by Sephy, lifted Abhaya's body, took it out of the kitchen and dumped it in a well behind the building.

=== 2009 ===
On 1 January 2009, Kerala High Court Justice K. Hema granted conditional bail to Catholic priests Thomas Kootoor and Jose Puthrukakyil and Sister Sephy. The CBI had pleaded with the Chief Justice that the bail application should be moved out of Hema's court as she was "prejudiced towards the case."

Hema found that the arguments of the CBI counsel were based on the stories appearing in the media rather than on the case diary. Counsel responded that the arguments had been accepted by the earlier courts. Based on the case diary, Hema found that the CBI investigation was "only a chase for the shadow rather the object in this case. This chase is only a futile exercise. Investigation means to carefully examine the facts of a situation, an event, a crime, etc., to find out the truth about it or how it happened. It is not to fix the target first, without any evidence and then make a hunt for evidence."

Hema also criticised the media and the public, which pronounced the verdict knowing very little about the facts of the case, including the 24 volumes of case diary, the medical reports and the statements from the doctors. Hema also mentioned the accusations propagated by the media, public and the CBI against officers of the local police and crime branch without any incriminating evidence.

Hema refuted the argument that ASI Augustine tried to suppress facts. The case diary indicates that it was Augustine, who was in charge of the case for only two days, recorded the possibility of murder. Hema also observed that nowhere in the case diary is there any mention that the church had tried to influence the investigation. Hema also made observations on the reliability of the narco analysis CDs and ordered production of the original CDs.

On 18 December 2008, Kerala Kaumudi wrote an editorial criticizing Hema's conduct during the bail hearing. A Division Bench of the High Court initiated criminal contempt of court proceedings against the newspaper on the basis of the editorial. Subsequently, Kerala High Court dropped the proceedings against Kerala Kaumudi, noting there was no instance of any violation/contempt of court in whatsoever manner.

==== CBI filed chargesheet ====
On 17 July 2009, the CBI Deputy superintendent of police Nandakumar Nair filed a chargesheet in the Court of Chief Judicial Magistrate Ernakulam, charging Fathers Kottoor and Poothrikkayil and Sister Sephy with murder, destruction of evidence, and defamation.

==== Alleged confession ====
In September 2009, the tapes, which were claimed to be recordings of the narco tests conducted by CBI agents on the three accused were leaked to Kairali TV, a local television station. These revealed the alleged confessions of Father Jose Poothrikkayil, Father Thomas M. Kottur and Sister Sephy, who were all in the state of sedation. The videos, which have been uploaded to YouTube, showed the suspects detailing what happened during the night of the murder after having been injected with the truth serum. It was not clear whether the tapes were authentic or if it were accepted as evidence by the court.

==== 2018 developments ====
In January 2018, reports indicated that former SP, K.T. Michael, was included in the list of the accused in the case based on an order of a special CBI court. Michael, who was part of the preliminary police investigation, was charged for allegedly destroying evidence such as the victim's robe and diary. His name was removed following a case filed at the High Court against the charges.

In March 2018, Father Jose Poothrukkayil was acquitted by the special CBI court, which cited a failure on the part of the prosecutors to find substantial evidence that proves the accused visited the convent on the day of the murder. The discharge petitions of the other two were rejected.

== Trial Court verdict ==
On 22 December 2020, after 28 years of investigation, the CBI Court found Father Kottoor and Sister Sephy to be guilty of the murder. The verdict is attributed to the key witness, Adakka Raju who stumbled upon the scene of murder while on a robbery. The witness' evidence proved crucial in the trial as the many of other witnesses reneged on their testimony and he was the only one who did not surrender to the threats and bribes. On 23 December 2020, CBI court sentenced both to life imprisonment and imposed a fine of 5 lakh each. The first ever response from the church about the case came just after the verdict and it said that the verdict is unbelievable and both the culprits have right to prove their innocence in higher courts.

=== Details of Trial Court sentence ===
(1) Accused Father Thomas Kottoor and Sister Sephy are sentenced to undergo imprisonment for life and a fine of ₹5 lakh (equivalent to ₹6.4 lakh or US$6,900 in 2026) is imposed on each of them for the offence u/s 302 r/w 34 of the Indian Penal Code, in default of payment of fine, he / she shall undergo simple imprisonment for a period of two years.

(2) Father Thomas Kottoor and Sister Sephy shall undergo rigorous imprisonment for seven years and a fine of ₹50,000 (equivalent to ₹64,000 or US$690 in 2026) is imposed on each of them for the offence u/s 201 r/w 34 of the Indian Penal Code, in default of payment of fine, the convicts shall undergo simple imprisonment for a period of one year.

(3) Accused Father Thomas Kottoor is also sentenced to undergo life imprisonment and a fine of ₹1 lakh (equivalent to ₹1.3 lakh or US$1,400 in 2026) is imposed on him for the offence u/s 449 of the Indian Penal Code, in default of payment of fine, he shall undergo simple imprisonment for a period of one year.

The sentences of Father Thomas Kottoor and Sister Sephy shall run concurrently. The accused Father Thomas Kottoor is committed to the Poojappura Central Prison and accused Sister Sephy is committed to Women's Prison, Thiruvananthapuram, to serve the sentence imposed.

=== Motives ===
The CBI informed the Kerala High Court in late November 2008 and early December 2008 that Sister Abhaya had accidentally intruded upon Sister Sephy and the other two accused priests in a "compromising position." Sister Sephy panicked and, on the spur of the moment, Sephy hit Abhaya with an axe meant for chopping firewood. The three accused together dumped Abhaya's body into the well.

CBI also informed the High Court about the remarkable degree of care the accused took to hide the crime. This included hymen-restoration (hymenoplasty or hymenorrhaphy) procedure Sister Sephy underwent allegedly in the church's hospital, which was discovered through gynaecological tests conducted on her in late 2008. Further her pendulous breasts were also counted as a result of regular sexual relations. This was strongly refuted by the accused. The counsel for the accused dared CBI to prove that such an operation has ever been conducted in India. Moreover, the building where the crime was committed was extensively remodeled under the guise of restoration work to allegedly deface the scene.

== In popular culture ==
The 1999 Malayalam film Crime File starring Suresh Gopi directed by K Madhu Nair in the lead role was inspired by Sister Abhaya's murder. After on its release, the climax was reshot and altered from its original version after protest from Catholics in Kerala.
