= Gheevarghese Aprem =

Indian bishop (born 1961)

Mar Gheevarghese Aprem
- Auxiliary bishop of Kottayam
- Church: Syro-Malabar Catholic Church
- Archdiocese: Kottayam
- Diocese: Syro-Malabar Catholic Archeparchy of Kottayam
- Appointed: 29 August 2020
- Predecessor: Post created

Orders
- Ordination: 27 December 1987
- Consecration: 14 November 2020 by Mathew Moolakkatt, Thomas Koorilos, and Joseph Pandarasseril

Personal details
- Born: George Kurisummoottil; 9 August 1961 (age 64) Tiruvalla, Kerala

Gheevarghese Mar Aprem is the Auxiliary bishop of the Syro-Malabar Catholic Archeparchy of Kottayam . He was elected by the synod of the Syro-Malabar Catholic Church as the Auxiliary Bishop on 29 August 2020.

== Early life and education ==
Gheevarhese Mar Aprem was born George Kurisummotil on 9 August 1961, in Thiruvalla, Kerala as a member of the Knanaya malankara Catholic community. He began his priestly formation at St. Stanislaw's Minor Seminary in Kottayam. He then continued his studies at St. Joseph's Diocesan Seminary in Mangalore.

== Ministry ==
After his ordination, He served as the Kottayam Minor Seminary as its vice rector and then served in numerous parishes for a decade while attaining a master's in sacred art at the Holy Spirit Maronite University in Kaslik, Lebanon. After his master's, He taught iconography at Saint Ephrem Ecumenical Research Institute and theology of icons at the Saint Thomas Apostolic Seminary. He then served as director of the "Hadusa" Commission for the Performing Arts till he was appointed as the parish priest of Saint Theresa's Catholic Church, Ranni, a role that he served until his appointment as bishop. In 2019, Archbishop Mathew Moolakkatt appointed him as the vicar-general of the Syro Malankara Faithful in the archdiocese.

== Auxiliary bishop ==
He was appointed on 29 August 2020, After long consideration and debate between the Syro Malabar Archeparchy, The Synod, and the Syro Malankara Catholicos for the need of an auxiliary bishop for the Syro Malankara Faithful in the Community. He was consecrated by the Metropolitan Archbishop of Thiruvilla Thomas Mar Koorilos , Mar Joseph Pandarasseril, and Mar Matthew Moolakkatt.

Catholic Church titles
Preceded by Post Created	Auxiliary Bishop of the Archdiocese of Kottayam 14 November 2020 –	Incumbent
