= 2016 in religion =

This is a timeline of events during the year 2016 which relate to religion.

== Events ==
- 12 February – Pope Francis and Patriarch Kirill of Moscow meet in Havana, Cuba, and issue a joint declaration.
- 27 March – An Islamist terrorist affiliated with the Pakistani Taliban attacks Gulshan-e-Iqbal Park in Lahore, Pakistan, targeting Christians celebrating Easter.
- 8 April – Pope Francis issues Amoris laetitia as an apostolic exhortation.
- 7 May – The Ferhat Pasha Mosque reopens in Banja Luka, Bosnia and Herzegovina, reconstructed after its destruction during the Bosnian War.
- 26 July – Islamist terrorists attack a church and kill a priest in Rouen, France.
- 28 July – Pope Francis speaks at World Youth Day 2016 in Kraków, Poland.
- 25 August – A conference of Islamic scholars is held in Grozny, Chechnya, creating a schism between different schools of Sunni Islam.
- 9 October – Joseph Srampickal is consecrated as the first bishop of the Syro-Malabar Catholic Eparchy of Great Britain.
- 19 October – The Santiago Bahá'í Temple opens in Santiago, Chile.
- 20 November – The Extraordinary Jubilee of Mercy ends with the Feast of Christ the King.
- 29 November – Leah Remini: Scientology and the Aftermath began airing in the United States, bringing increased attention to controversies associated with the Church of Scientology.
