= Thomas Animoottil =

Indian Syro-Malabar Catholic bishop (born 1962)

- Auxiliary bishop of Kottayam
- Church: Syro-Malabar Catholic Church
- Archdiocese: Kottayam
- See: Titular Bishop of Troina
- Appointed: 27 August 2026
- Previous post: Pro-Protosyncellus of the Archeparchy of Kottayam (2025–2026)

Orders
- Ordination: 13 April 1989 by Kuriakose Kunnacherry
- Consecration: 2 October 2026 by Mathew Moolakkatt

Personal details
- Born: 13 January 1962 (age 64) Payyavoor, Kerala, India
- Education: University of Mysore, Pontifical University of the Holy Cross

Thomas Animoottil (born 13 January 1962) is an Indian Syro-Malabar Catholic hierarch who has served as an auxiliary bishop of the Archeparchy of Kottayam and the titular bishop of Troina since 27 August 2026 by the Synod of the Syro-Malabar Major Archiepiscopal Church, with the prior assent of Pope Leo XIV.

== Early life and education ==
Animoottil was born in Payyavoor, Kerala, on 13 January 1962. He completed his primary and secondary education in Payyavoor and his university studies in the University of Mysore. He subsequently entered St. Stanislaus Minor Seminary in Kottayam for priestly formation. He studied philosophy and theology at St. Joseph's Seminary in Mangalore.

He was ordained a priest on 13 April 1989. He later pursued higher studies in Rome at the Pontifical University of the Holy Cross, obtaining a Licentiate in canon law in 1993.

== Priestly ministry ==
Following his ordination, Animoottil served in the Archeparchy of Kottayam in a number of pastoral and administrative positions. His assignments included parish priest of Pulinjal, secretary to the eparchial bishop, eparchial chancellor, secretary of the Pastoral Council, ecclesiastical adviser to the Catholic Nurses Guild of India, and vicar forane of Uzhavoor and Kaduthuruthy.

From 2003 to 2008, he carried out pastoral ministry in the Eparchy of Saint Thomas the Apostle of Chicago in the United States. In the United States, Animoottil served as director of the St. Pius X Knanaya Catholic Mission in Los Angeles (2003–2005), the St. Stephen's Knanaya Catholic Mission in New York (2005–2008), and the Knanaya Catholic Mission in Carteret, New Jersey (2005–2008).

In 2025, he became Pro-Protosyncellus of the Archeparchy of Kottayam.

== Episcopacy ==
On 27 August 2026, the Synod of the Syro-Malabar Major Archiepiscopal Church canonically elected Animoottil as auxiliary bishop of the Archeparchy of Kottayam. The election had received the prior assent of Pope Leo XIV, and the Holy See announced the appointment on the same day, with an assignment him the titular see of Troina.
