= Caritas Hospital =

Geography
- Location: Thellakom, Kottayam district, Kerala, India
- Coordinates: 9.645405°N 76.549203°E

Organisation
- Type: Hospital

Services
- Emergency department: Yes
- Beds: 655

History
- Founded: 1962; 64 years ago

Links
- Website: www.caritashospital.org
- Lists: Hospitals in India

The Caritas Hospital is a hospital in Thellakom under the Ettumanoor municipality in Kottayam district, Kerala, India. The hospital is run by the Syro-Malabar Knanaya Catholic Archeparchy of Kottayam.

== History ==
The Caritas Hospital foundation stone was laid by Cardinal Tiserang in the presence of Mar Thomas Tharayil, Bishop of Kottayam on 27 November 1953. The roughly six acre site of the hospital was donated by Joseph Vallapally's widow and children.

In 1962, Mar Thomas Tharayil, in collaboration with a few Germans, started the healthcare venture and named it 'CARITAS'.

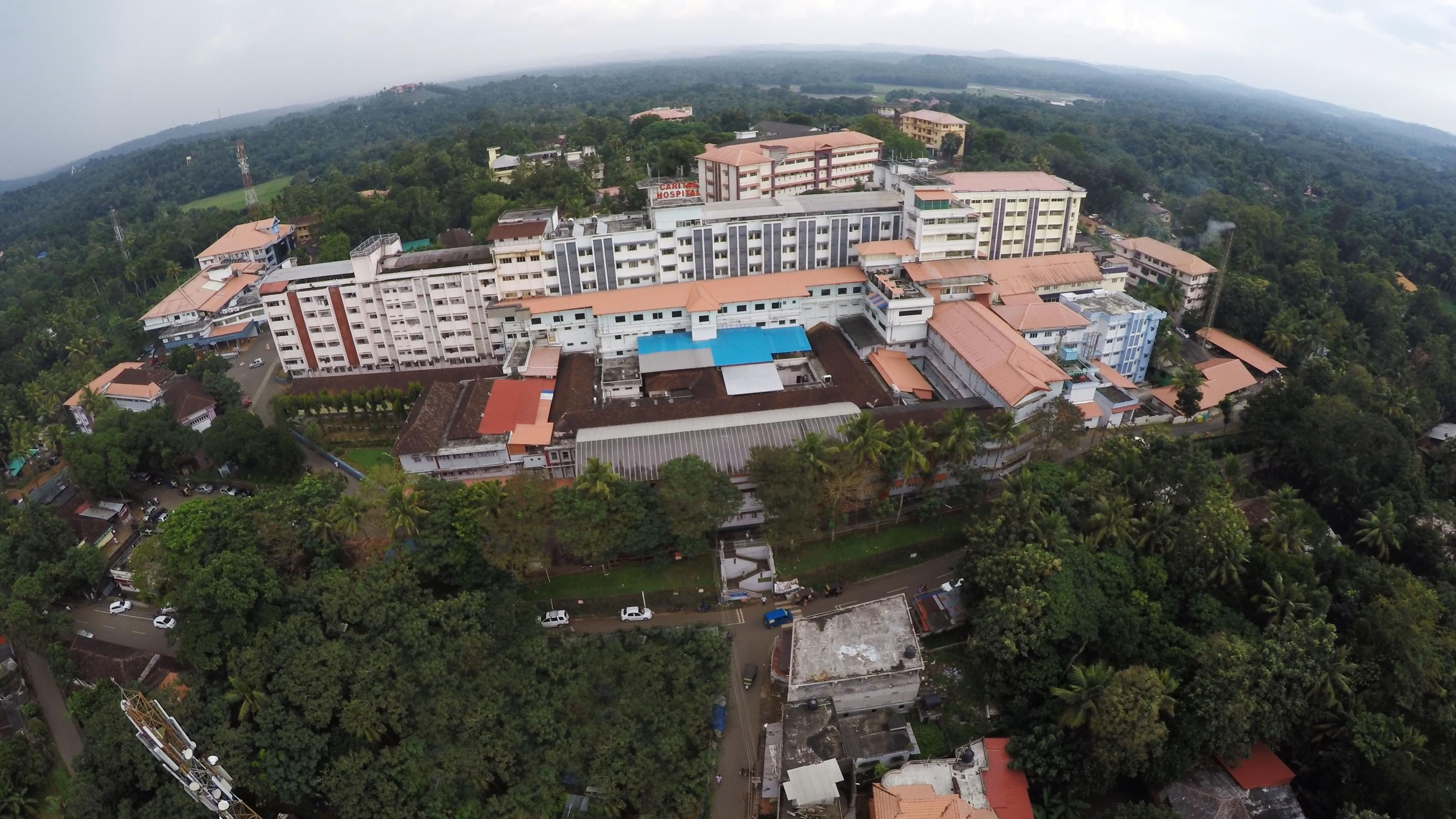
Caritas Hospital aerial view
