= Kaipuzha =

- village
- Location in Kerala, India Kaipuzha (India)
- Coordinates: 9°40′0″N 76°30′0″E
- Country: India
- State: Kerala
- District: Kottayam

Population (2001)
  - Total: 6,991

Languages
  - Official: Malayalam, English
- Time zone: UTC+5:30 (IST)
- Postal code: 686602
- Vehicle registration: KL-

Kaipuzha is a small village in Kottayam District and sub-district in the Indian state of Kerala. As of the 2001 census, it had a population of 6,991 in 1,565 households.

== Geography ==
The name Kaipuzha is derived from the two words Kai (which means "hand") and Puzha (which means "river"). This is a testament to the many small canal-like rivers found in the vicinity and it is a tributary of meenachil river . It is bounded by Ettumanoor to the east and Mannanam to the south. Nearby villages also include Athirampuzha, Neendoor, Kurumulloor, Manjoor, Kallara, and Vechoor which gave its name to the Vechur cow, smallest breed of cattle found anywhere in the world. Kottayam Town is located 7 km south.

== History ==
Kaipuzha, Athirampuzha, and Ettumanoor were popular places for trade purposes because of the navigable rivers found all over the area. In the olden days, Kaipuzha was believed to be one of the border villages between the Thekkumkur and Vadakkumkur kingdoms. When Thekkumkur and Vadakkumkur were defeated by the Travancore kingdom, Kaipuzha came under Travancore. K.E. College, which was founded and named after the Blessed Kuriakose Elias Chavara was once believed to originally be planned to be built in Kaipuzha, but politics within the community changed that location to nearby Mannanam.

== Religion ==
The majority of people are either Hindus or Christians. One ancient temple found in Kaipuzha is Sri Dharma Sastha temple, which is located near the Sasthankal junction. Legend proclaims that it was Sree Parasurama who consecrated the idol of Lord Ayyappa in this temple, facing to the West. Kaipuzha has its place in the famous book "EITHIHYAMALA" by Sri Kottarathil Sankunni. Historical scripts reveal that during the region of the Edathil Royal family, this temple gained fame, and Pujas and rituals were held with all of its grandeur. St. George’s Forane Church was built in 1813. Bishop Thomas Tharayil, the third bishop of the Knanaya Kottayam Archdiocese was born here. Hindus are a minority and there are no Muslims in this village.

== Notable residents ==
Thomas Tharayil 3rd Bishop of Knanaya Kottayam Archdiocese

Justice Cyriac Joseph was born in Kaipuzha.
