= Joseph Pandarasseril =

Syro-Malabar bishop

Mar Joseph Pandarasseril
- Auxiliary bishop of Kottayam
- Church: Syro-Malabar Catholic Church
- Archdiocese: Kottayam
- Appointed: September 21, 2006

Orders
- Ordination: December 28, 1987
- Consecration: October 28, 2006 by Kuriakose Kunnacherry, Mathew Moolakkatt, and Baselios Cleemis

Personal details
- Born: 18 April 1961 (age 65) Ettumanoor, Kottayam

Mar Joseph Pandarasseril is the Auxiliary bishop of the Syro-Malabar Catholic Archeparchy of Kottayam . He was elected by the synod of the Syro-Malabar Catholic Church as the Auxiliary Bishop on September 21, 2006.

== Early Ministry and Education ==
Prior to his appointment, He served as Chancellor, Eparchial Judge, Eparchial Consulter, and the Vicar General for the Syro Malabar Knanaya Faithful. He studied Canon Law at Pontifical University of the Holy Cross in Rome and took Licentiate Degree in 1995.

== Auxiliary Bishop ==
He was appointed on September 21, 2006, to succeed the new archbishop Mathew Moolakkatt as his successor in the role of Auxiliary Bishop. He was consecrated by the Catholicos of the Syro-Malankara Catholic Church Baselios Cleemis, Archbishop Emeritus Kuriakose Kunnacherry, and Moolakkatt.
