= Thomas Tharayil =

Thomas Tharayil may refer to:

- Thomas Tharayil (bishop of Kottayam) (1899–1975)
- Thomas Tharayil (archbishop of Changanassery) (born 1972)
