= Ladislaus Michal Zaleski =

Władysław Michał Bonifacy Zaleski
- Titular Patriarch of Antioch
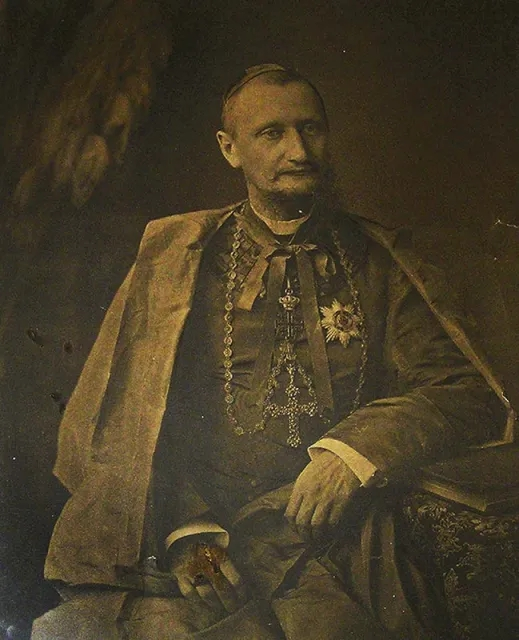
- Native name: Władysław Michał Bonifacy Zaleski

Orders
- Ordination: 1882 or 1885
- Consecration: 15 May 1892 by Archbishop Paul François Marie Goethals, S.J.

Personal details
- Born: May 25, 1852 Veliuona, Lithuania
- Died: October 5, 1925 (aged 73) Rome
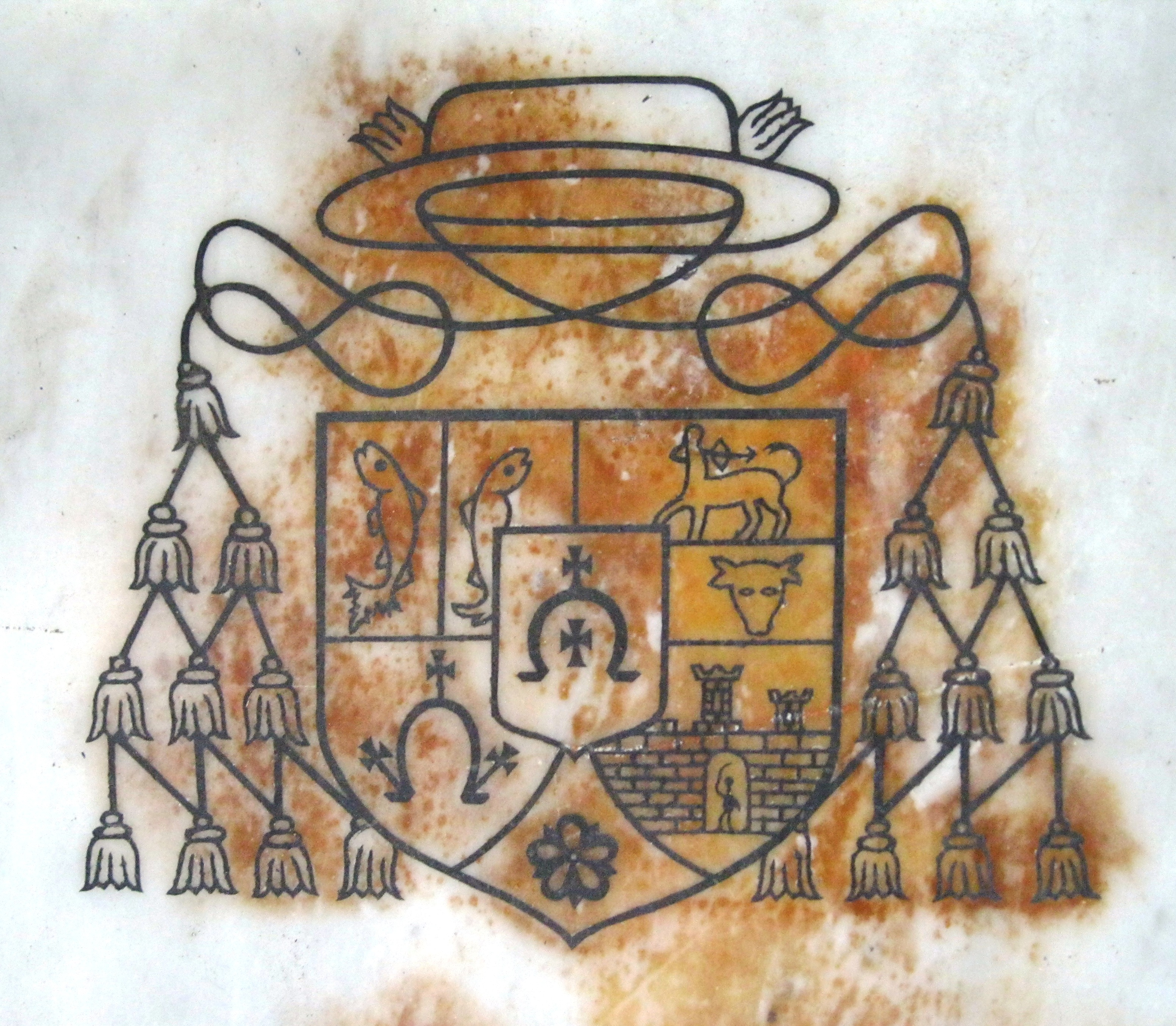
- Coat of arms

Władysław Michał Bonifacy Zaleski (also called Vladislovas Mykolas Zaleskis in Lithuanian or Ladislao Michele Zaleski in English, 1852 – 1925) was a Catholic archbishop, pioneer missionary, Apostolic Delegate to the East Indies and Latin Patriarch of Antioch.

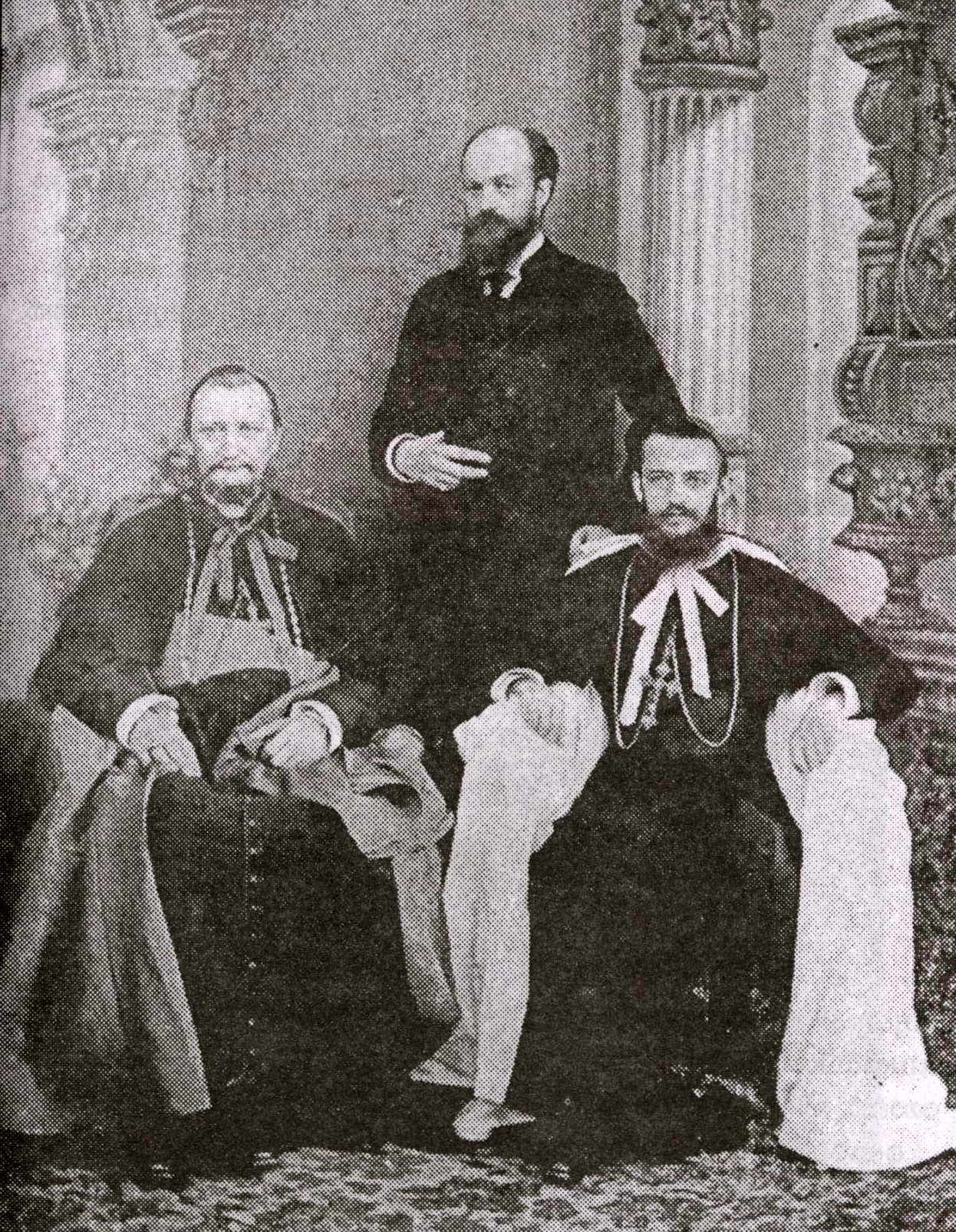
Archbishop Ladislas Zaleski (left) and Bishop Aloysius Benziger, 1900

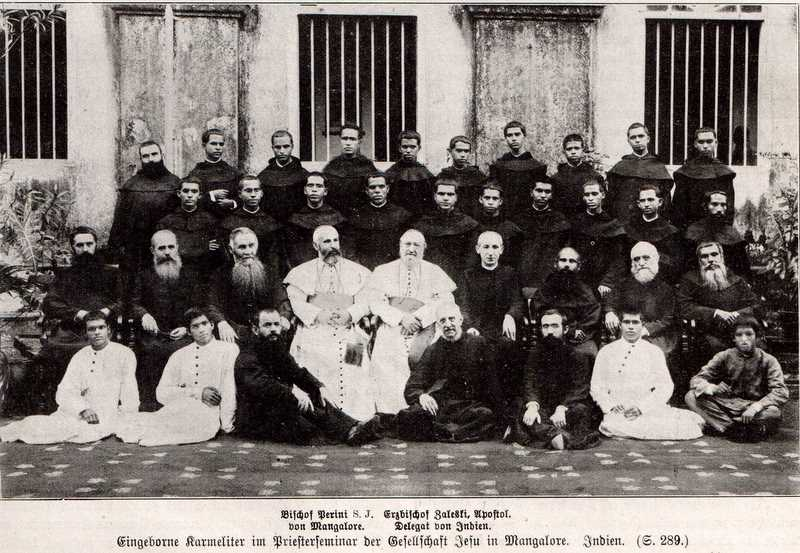
Archbishop Ladislao Zaleski (right, the two white-robed bishops in the center), 1914 at the Seminary of Mangalore, India

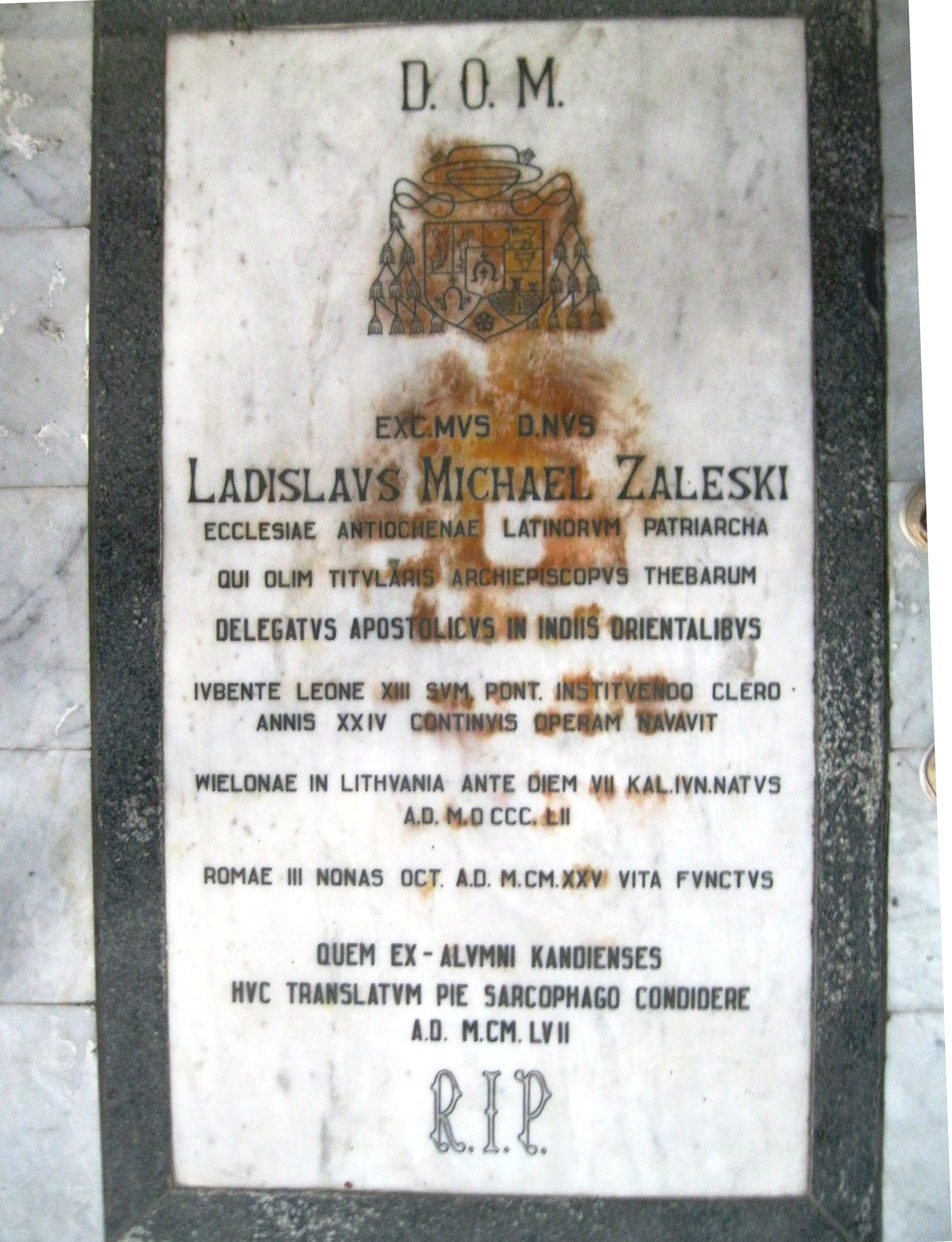
Plaque marking the remains of Zaleski near the altar of the Papal Seminary chapel

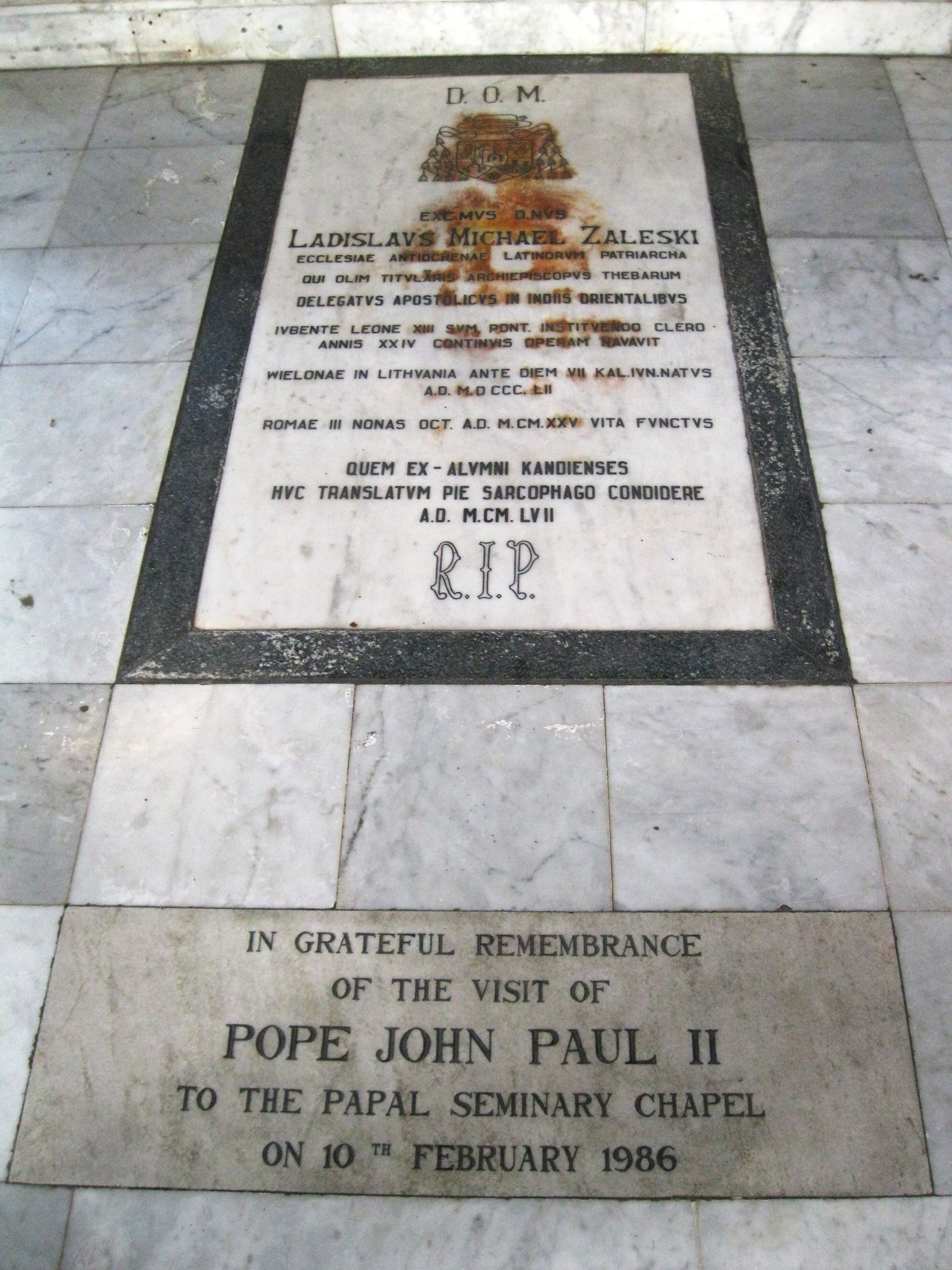
A plaque has been installed at the place where Pope John Paul II knelt to pray in front of his compatriot Zaleski's remains

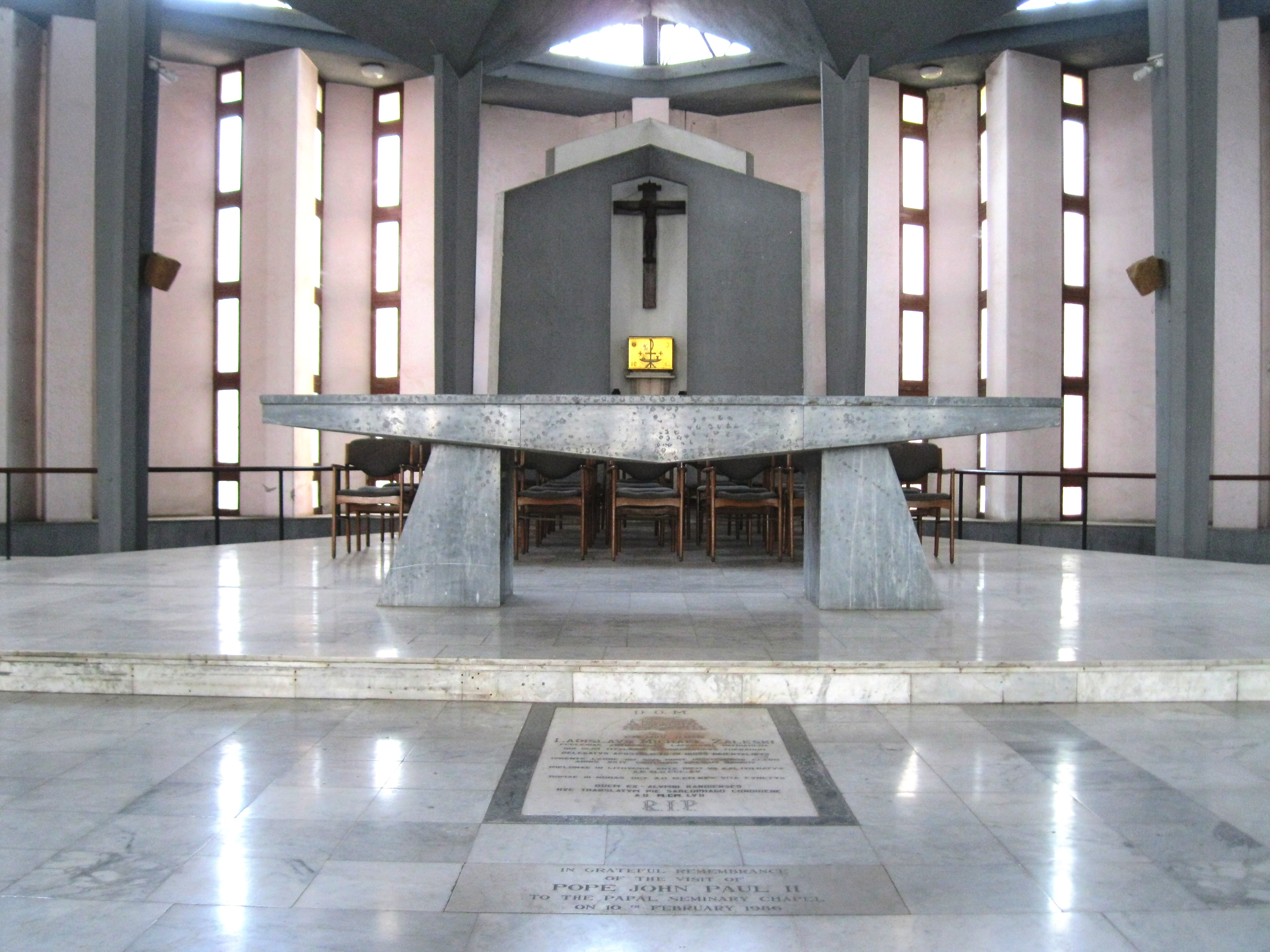
The two plaques are in front of the altar of the Papal Seminary chapel

== Youth and education ==
Zaleski was born in Veliuona (Lithuania then under Russian rule). He was the son of Leon and Gabriela de domo Dombrowicz. Since there were no Polish schools in Vilnius, he did his primary and secondary schooling privately and he graduated from high school in Kaunas. In 1880 he joined the Warsaw Theological Seminary, and he went in 1881 for further studies at the Pontifical Gregorian University in Rome. There he received his doctorate and received a diplomatic training, which he completed in 1885, while attending a course in theology at the Collegium Romanum.

== Diplomat of the Holy See ==
After his ordination in 1882 or 1885 in Florence, he was sent on a diplomatic mission to Spain, and a year later for the first time went to the East Indies, accompanying Antonio Agliardi, the Titular Archbishop of Cesarea and first Apostolic Delegate in India. In 1887, Pope Leo XIII appointed him as his personal representative to the 50th anniversary of the reign of Queen Victoria. For a time, Zaleski remained employed in the Roman Curia, as consulter on Eastern affairs at the Congregation for the Propagation of the Faith (Propaganda Fidei). From 1889 to 1890 Ladislaus Zaleski worked at the nunciature in Paris. In 1890 he returned to India, where on 5 March 1892 he replaced Archbishop Andrea Aiuti as the Apostolic Delegate of the East Indies.

== Apostolic Delegate to India ==
Along with the nomination for Apostolic Delegate in the East Indies, Zaleski was elevated to the dignity of archbishop and was appointed as the Titular Archbishop of Thebes. The area of his official activities ranged from Afghanistan and the Himalayas in the north, to Ceylon and the neighboring islands of the Indian Ocean in the south. On the initiative of the Archbishop eight ecclesiastical provinces and twenty-seven dioceses were founded in the territory. Archbishop Zaleski resided in Kandy, where he founded a national seminary, Papal Seminary, which produced 51 bishops and three cardinals over the years. Zaleski also initiated the creation of many minor seminaries and ordained several bishops, including local priests Augustine Kandathil (1911) and Alexander Chulaparambil (1914). Zaleski was almost constantly travelling on missionary work, even outside of his delegation. He visited, among other places, China, Japan, Indo-China, Java and the Philippines. He was the most outstanding Polish traveler in this region in the late nineteenth century. During his tenure as the Apostolic Delegate, he broadened his polyglot skills having already mastered eight European languages, to which he added Tamil and Sinhalese.

Archbishop Zalesky was Apostolic Delegate for the supervision of all Roman Catholic missions of the East Indies, that is, over an area that was about half as large as the whole of Europe, including Russia and in which 300 million people lived. His closest companion was Father Aloysius Benziger, who took care of the secretariat independently. Into his hands came the letters from all parts of India, reports, requests, complaints, and cries for help. He had to write their answers on the Indian bishops to enter into negotiations to assign missionaries to resolve difficulties. It was his job to keep Rome up to date; his drafting of the Inspectorate reports was transmitted. These Inspectorate reports presuppose that Father Benziger made the inspection trips. He learned in this way about the whole of India, other countries, peoples and states, their kings and princes, the different races and religions, the character of the individual tribes."

Ladislaus Zaleski presided over several provincial synods in India, and worked to strengthen the local church hierarchy and promote sustainable growth of the missions. He rediscovered the Indian priest Joseph Vaz (1651-1711), called as the apostle of Ceylon at the end of the nineteenth century, and became a Blessed Joseph Vaz devotee and admirer, publishing an account of his life. He held him up as a model for the native clergy he had been sent to train, and proposed that a new Cause for Canonization be started for Vaz. Zaleski's fellow Pole Pope John Paul II would beatify Vaz in 1995. Zaleski also did some research about the 2012-beatified, Indian martyrs including Devasahayam Pillai (1712-1752), and promoted devotions to them. Archbishop Zaleski was the principal consecrator for Indian bishops Aloysius Benziger (bishop of Quilon), Augustine Kandathil, and Alexander Chulaparambil.

Zaleski's mission ended in 1916, after almost thirty years of residence in Asia. After returning to Rome he was nominated as the Patriarch of Antioch by Pope Benedict XV. Pope Benedict considered in 1919 his candidacy for the nomination of Cardinal, but eventually in the consistory that year other Polish bishops received the scarlet – Edmund Dalbor and Alexander Kakowski. Zaleski was in Rome for the rest of his life, where he died on 5 October 1925. He expressed the wish that his remains come to rest among those for whom he had laboured. With the transfer of the Papal Seminary, which he founded, from Kandy to its new location in Pune, in India, the Alumni of the same Seminary, some of whom had known Zaleski, fulfilled his wish, when his remains were transferred in 1955. Mgr. Zaleski's remains now rest in the Seminary at the floor of the altar in the new Chapel. After his death, he was honored by naming one of Colombo's areas as 'Zaleski Place' (in 1937). Throughout his life, Zaleski kept in touch with the home country, often emphasizing his attachment to Poland.

== Botanist ==
Zaleski's stay in India was not limited to pastoral and missionary activities. He was into botanical science, gathering a large collection of tropical plants. This collection, numbering about 35,000 images of flora Indo-Malay, went to the Department of Plant Systematics and Geography, University of Warsaw. Among other topics in his books of travel, Zaleski described Botanical Gardens at Buitenzorg (in Java) and Penang (Malaysia) and several exotic plants he encountered during his travels.

== Publications ==
Patriarch Zaleski was the author of several travel and ethnographic works. His published works run into more than seven and a half thousand pages of print, and he left a further seven thousand pages of manuscripts. Some books were written under pseudonyms, including the History of Ceylon from 1913 as G. Francis, and under the pseudonym 'Pierre Courtenay' he published several books of adventure for young people. He was also accomplished in poetry.

== Bibliography ==
- The Apostle of Ceylon: Fr. Joseph Vaz, an Oratorian priest 1651-1711. St. Joseph's Catholic Press. 1991.
- Voyage a Ceylan et aux Indes : 1887 / par monseigneur Zaleski - OPAC - Biblioteca nazionale di Firenze.
- Ceylan et les Indes (in French). A. Savine. 1891. ISBN 1391113993.
- Podróż po Indo-Chinach r. 1897 i 1898 - Prolib Integro. (A journey through Indo-China, Java and Chinese coasts in 1897 and 1898)
- L'APÔTRE ST. THOMAS ET L'INDE. L'histoire, la tradition, la légende. by ZALESKI Ladislaus Michael.: buone Brossura (1912) Prima edizione. | studio bibliografico pera s.a.s.. (The Apostle St. Thomas in India. History, Tradition and Legend)
- Les martyrs de l'Inde: constance des Indiens dans la foi (in French). Société de Saint-Augustin. 1900.
- The Martyrs of India. Codialbail Press. 1913.
- The saints of India. Codialbail Press. 1915.
- Les origines du Christianisme aux Indes : St. Barthelemy, St. Thomas, St. Pantene, St. Frumence | WorldCat.org. 1915. (The origins of Christianity in the Indies)

Diplomatic posts
| Preceded by Andrea Aiuti | Apostolic Delegate to India; 15 March 1892 - 7 December 1916 | Succeeded by Pietro Fumasoni Biondi |
Catholic Church titles
| Preceded by Lorenzo Passarini | Latin Patriarch of Antioch; 7 December 1916 - 5 October 1925 | Succeeded by Roberto Vicentini |
