= Alexander Chulaparambil =

Indian bishop

Mar Alexander Choolaparambil Bishop
- Bishop of Kottayam (1923–1951); Vicar Apostolic of Kottayam (1914–1923)
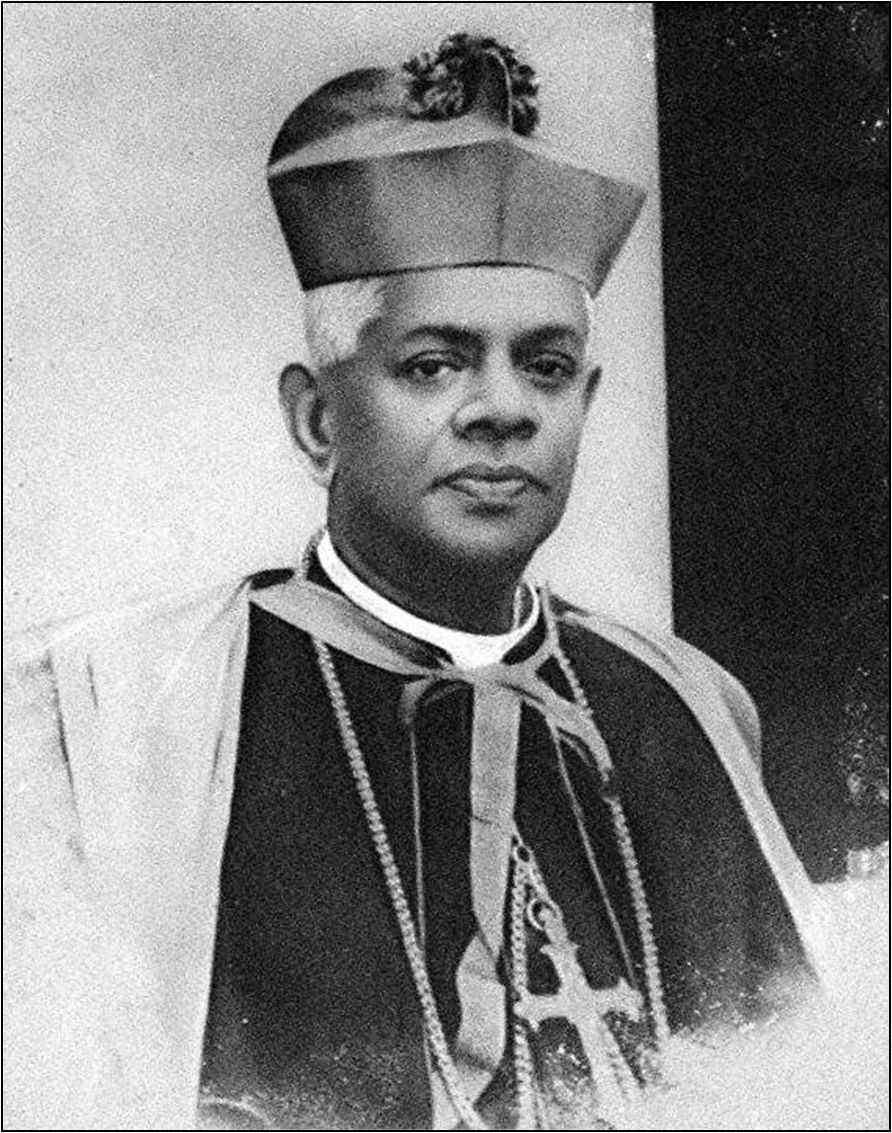
- Diocese: Syro-Malabar Catholic Archeparchy of Kottayam
- See: Kottayam
- Appointed: 16 July 1914
- Installed: 1 November 1914
- Term ended: 8 January 1951
- Predecessor: Matthew Makil
- Successor: Thomas Tharayil

Orders
- Ordination: 22 December 1906
- Consecration: 1 November 1914 by Archbishop Wladyslaw Michal Zaleski
- Rank: Bishop

Personal details
- Born: 14 October 1877 Kumarakom
- Died: 8 January 1951 (aged 73)

Bishop Alexander Choolaparambil (14 October 1877 – 8 January 1951) was born in Kumarakom, India. Ordained a priest in 1906, he was appointed Vicar Apostolic of Kottayam and then bishop of Busiris that same year. In 1923 Mar Choolaparampil became bishop of Kottayam, dying in that capacity in 1951.
