= Archeparchy of Kottayam =

Syro-Malabar Catholic ecclesiastical jurisdiction for the Knanaya faithful in India

Archeparchy of Kottayam ܐܪܟܝܕܝܘܩܝܐ ܕܟܘܬܝܡ
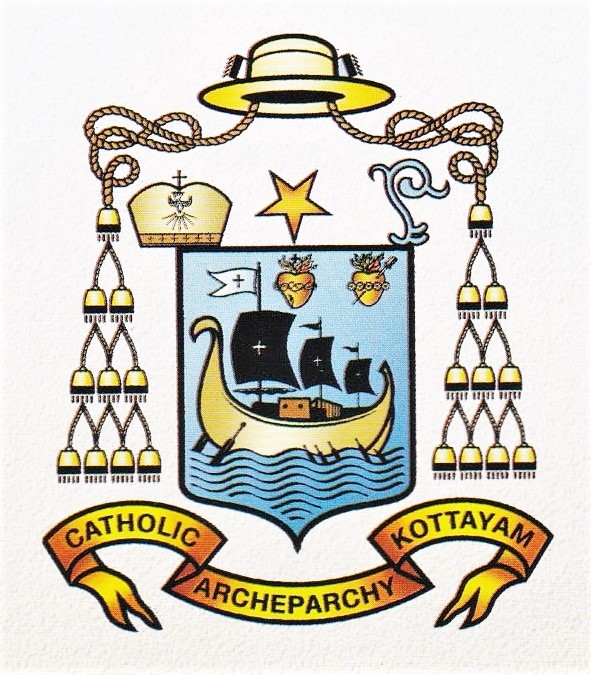
- Coat of arms

Location
- Country: India
- Territory: Global (Over all Knanaya Catholics)
- Ecclesiastical province: Kottayam
- Metropolitan: Kottayam
- Subdivisions: 14 Foranes
- Headquarters: Archbishop's House, Kottayam

Statistics
- Population: (as of 2023); 190,985
- Parishes: 144
- Churches: 153
- Congregations: 11
- Schools: 146

Information
- Denomination: Roman Catholic Church
- Sui iuris church: Syro-Malabar Church
- Rite: East Syriac Rite with a minority West Syriac Rite
- Established: 1911; 115 years ago
- Cathedral: Christ the King Cathedral, Kottayam
- Patrons: Sacred Heart of Jesus and Pope St. Pius X
- Secular priests: 363
- Language: Malayalam

Current leadership
- Pope: Leo XIV
- Major Archbishop: Raphael Thattil
- Metropolitan Archbishop: Mathew Moolakkatt
- Auxiliary Bishops: Joseph Pandarasseril; Gheevarghese Aprem; Thomas Animoottil
- Episcopal Vicars: Fr. Michael Vettikatt

Website
- kottayamad.org

The Archeparchy of Kottayam is a Knanaya metropolitan archeparchy of the Syro-Malabar Catholic Church in India. The archeparchy is exclusively for Knanaya people, an endogamous ethnic group who claim to be the descendants of Syriac Judeo-Christians (early East Syriac Christians) who migrated from South Mesopotamia to Kodungallur (Muziris) in South India in 4th century A.D.

It is unique in having both Syro-Malabar and Syro-Malankara rites within its jurisdiction.

== History of the archeparchy ==
=== Community formation ===
Traditional belief is that St. Thomas, one of the 12 apostles of Jesus, had introduced Christianity in the Malabar coast in South India. His port of entry was Kodungalloor, formerly known as Muziris. Trade relations between the Middle East and the Malabar coast might have favored the arrival of St. Thomas to Kodungallur. The presence of Jews in the South West India from the 6th century B.C. also might have been another attraction for St. Thomas to arrive at Muziris so he could introduce Jesus and his teachings starting with the Jews here.

Another Thomas, a rich and influential merchant from South Mesopotamia, had trade relations in the fourth century with the Malabar coast. He was a Christian from the Chaldean church. He made acquaintance with the local Christians in Kodungalloor, who were descendants of the Christian converts from St. Thomas, the Apostle. The Christian community at Kodungalloor sought the help of Merchant Thomas to get clergy to lead their church, as they were weakening because of the lack of clergy.

Thomas reported the need of the Christians in Kodungalloor to his church leaders in South Mesopotamia. The Catholicos took the matter seriously. There is a tradition that Urha Yausef was inspired by God to support the Christians in the Malabar coast. The church authorities came up with the idea of sending a bishop and some clergy along with some families to migrate in Kodungalloor so the clergy also would feel comfortable in the foreign land. Thomas of Kynai, being influential, could get permission from Cheraman Perumal, the king of Kodungallur. The king might have welcomed the new migrants to keep better trade relations with the Middle East and to import the material and technical resources of the immigrants. The fertility and favorable conditions of Kodungalloor might have attracted the families in South Mesopotamia to migrate to the Malabar coast.

Bishop Urha Mar Yausef, four priests, and several deacons volunteered to migrate to Malabar coast to offer their missionary service to the St. Thomas Christian community in the Malabar coast. Along with them, around 400 people belonging to 72 Jewish-Christian families from seven clans also came under the leadership of Kynai Thomman. The Knanaya community believes that the families selected were 72 to represent the same number of disciples of Jesus and seven clans to remind them of the seven sacraments Jesus instituted in the church. The migration, according to tradition, happened in 345 A.D. Considering their distinctiveness including their culture, language, customs, food, and dress from the natives, the migrants preferred to live as a colony without having marital relations with others. King Cheraman Perumal assigned them a vacant land in the southern part of his palace for the new settlers. Since they inhabited the Southern region of the Kingdom, they were known as Southists while other Christians were known as Northists to distinguish both groups. The first written record of the epithet Knanaya used in reference to the community dates to the 1800s. Translations of Thomas' epithet Canaanite as "Cananeo" are recorded in a 17th-century source work. Archbishop of Kodungallur-Angamaly, Francis Roz, refers to the Southist as the "Thomas Cananeo Party" in his documents dated to 1603/1604. Honoring the new migrants and their leader Kynai Thomas, the king offered 72 privileges for the Christians acknowledging them as higher class people in his kingdom. The privileges were documented on copper plates known as Thomas of Cana copper plates. The plates were present in Kerala during the time of the Portuguese colonization in the early 17th century, but were lost during Portuguese rule. Portuguese Archbishop Francisco Ros notes in his 1604 account M.S. ADD 9853 that the plates were taken to Portugal by Franciscans. The Knanaites invoke the plates as evidence of their descent from Kynai Thoma's mission.

Bishop Urha Yausef might have popularized the Syriac Chaldean liturgy developed by Addai and Mari of the Chaldean church. Under his leadership the migrants established three churches in honor of St. Thomas, St. Mary, and St. Kuriakose. The bishop, along with other clergy, was serving the Northists and Southists at the same time for which they came to India. According to the traditional song, the Catholicos of the East had promised the migrants that he would send bishops to succeed Urha Yausef to continue the pastoral service for the Christians in Malabar. Thus, the bishops from the Chaldean church continued to succeed one another in serving the St. Thomas Christians in Kerala until the end of the 16th century when the missionaries from Europe took over the pastoral leadership along with the European colonization.

=== Dispersion from Kodungallur ===
The Southists had to leave their settlement in Kodungalloor because of the destruction of their colony during the war between the Kingdom of Cochin and Zamorin of Calicut in the 16th century. The community migrated to cities, mainly of river banks, like Udayamperoor (Diamper), Kaduthuruthy, Chungam (Thodupuzha), Kottayam, and Kallissery. Road transportation was less at that time and the means of transportation was by water like lakes, canals, and rivers.

The Northists and Southists in Malabar lived in harmony under the pastoral leadership of bishop from the Chaldean church and using the same Chaldean liturgy in the Syriac language. The bishop from Edessa was assisted for temporal administration by an Archdeacon who was a local priest.

Situation began to change when the European missionaries came to Malabar along with the colonial rule and mandate from the Pope for missionary service. The Synod of Diamper held from 20 to 26 June 1599 paved the way for revolt of Syrian Christians of Malabar against the Portuguese Jesuit missionaries because of the forceful changes they introduced in the form of worship and governance different from what had been practiced before. Pope assigned Francisco Ros, a Latin prelate as the bishop for the Syrians in Malabar avoiding the arrival of bishops from the Chaldean church. The Latinization of the Syrian church was the main cause of the objection.

The revolt against the Latin bishop came to a climax on 3 January 1653 with the Coonan Cross Oath of the Syrians at Mattancherry near Kochi. This protest against the Portuguese Padroado at the time of Archbishop Garcia S.J. resulted in the division of the Syrian Christians including the Knanaites based on their allegiance to the ecclesiastical authorities. Kadavil Chandy Kathanar from Kaduthuruthy parish and Anjilimoottil Itty Thomman Kathanar from Kallissery parish were among the major leaders of the revolt who were from the Southists. Though many compromised with the Portuguese archbishop after the revolt, the others made Archdeacon Thomas Parambil their "bishop" with the imposition of hands by 12 priests at Alangad. The dissident group welcomed a Jacobite Bishop Gregorios of Jerusalem in 1665 and followed his teachings. That led to the emergence and growth of the Jacobite faction among the Syrians while two third remained as Catholics under the Catholic Bishop Parambil Chandy, who was supported by Kadavil Chandy Kathanar and Vengūr Givargis Kathanar. Then on, the Catholics and Jacobites of the Southists remained separate from each other and from the Northists with their own churches or section within a common church and served by Southist priests. This article focuses on the Southist Catholics who later became members of the Archeparchy of Kottayam.

=== Vicariate of Kottayam ===
While administering the Syrian churches, the European missionaries established Latin churches also in Malabar. Churches of Latin and Syrian rites were under the Archdiocese of Verapoly. The co-adjutor bishop was in charge of the Syrians. On 20 May 1887, Pope Leo XII separated the Syrians from the Archdiocese of Verapoly by establishing the Vicariate of Kottayam including Northists and Southists and the Vicariate of Trichur. Pope appointed Dr. Charles Lavigne as the Vicar Apostolic of Kottayam and Dr. Adolf Medlycott as the Vicar Apostolic of Trichur. ("Quod Jam Pridem"). While establishing the Vicariate of Kottayam common for Southists and Northists, the Holy See ordered Bishop Charles Lavinge to appoint a separate vicar general for the Knanaites. Thus, Bishop Lavinge appointed a Knanaya priest Fr. Mathew Makil as vicar general for the Knanaya Catholics. The seat of Kottayam Vicariate was moved to Changanacherry on 16 September 1890. Bishop Charles Lavigne established eight foranes for the Northists, and Kottayam and Kaduthuruthy foranes for the Southists on 10 October 1891. With the permission of Bishop Charles Lavinge, Vicar General Fr. Mathew Makil started Sisters of the Visitation of the Blessed Virgin Mary (SVM) for Knanaya women at Kaipuzha on 24 June 1892.

Pope Leo XIII reconstituted the Vicariates of Changanacherry and Trichur by adding the Vicariate of Ernakulam with territories from Vicariates of Changanacherry and Thrissur on 28 July 1896. Pope appointed indigenous bishops for these vicariates. Aloysius Pazheparambil was appointed for Ernakulam and John Menacherry for Thrissur. The Knanaya Vicar General, Mathew Makil was appointed as the head of Changanacherry Vicariate that consisted of Southists and Northists ("Quae Rei Sacrae"). The episcopal consecration of the three bishops were held at Kandy in Sri Lanka on 25 October 1896.

In 1896, the Vicariate of Changanacherry consisted of 100 to109 thousand Northists with 133 parishes and 256 priests. The Knanaites in the vicariate at the same time were a minority of less than 10% with 14,000 to 20,000 members, 12 parishes, and 21 priests. Since the Northists and Southists had no communal relationship, a bishop from the minority community was naturally unacceptable for the majority community.

The Southists were worried that they would be divided under different vicariates. In 1896, when the Vicariate of Ernakulam was established 1,500 Southists came under that vicariate where as 12,500 were under the Vicariate of Changanacherry. They were also concerned about their fate under a Northist bishop after the term of Makil. So, both Norhists and Southists desired to have their own vicariates. The bishops governing the three Syrian Vicariates were convinced that such an arrangement would be the best solution for the issues of the time.

Considering the unanimous request of the three Syrian bishops under the leadership of the Vicar Apostolic of Changanacherry Mathew Makil, Pope Pius X established the new Vicariate of Kottayam on 29 August 1911 exclusively for the Southists (Pro Gente Sudhistica) by the Apostolic letter "In Universi Christiani." All the Southists belonging to the vicariates of Changanacherry and Ernakulam were brought under this reconstituted Vicariate of Kottayam. Pope appointed Mathew Makil as the head of the new vicariate.

Bishop Mathew Makil expired on 26 January 1914 at Kottayam. He was buried at St. George Church, Edacat.

Pope Pius X appointed Fr. Alexander Choolaparambil as the Vicar Apostolic of Kottayam on 16 July 1914. His consecration was held in Kandy, Sri Lanka on 1 November 1914. Choolaparambil established the Eparchial Society of the Oblates of the Sacred Heart (OSH) at S.H. Mount, Kottayam on 29 January 1921.

=== Syro-Malankara Rite ===
Since the Koonan Cross Oath on 3 January 1653, the Knanaya Community was divided as Catholic and Jacobite. That was painful for the community. Attempts were made for the reunification of the Knanaya Jacobites, who were one third of the community, to the Knanaya Catholic section. It got momentum under the leadership of Alexander Choolaparambil.

One hindrance was the diversity of the liturgical rite because the Jacobites follow the Syro-Antiochian rite and the Catholics use the Syro-Malabar (Chaldean) rite. The Knanaya Orthodox who were willing to join the Roman Catholic church preferred to continue the Antiochian liturgy. So, Alexander Choolaparambil took initiative to apply to the Holy See for permission to use the Antiochian Syrian Rite for those who reunite with the Roman Catholic church. The Holy See granted this permission on 5 July 1921. That facilitated the reunion of many Knanaya Jacobites to the Catholic Vicariate of Kottayam. Others still remain as Jacobites under the Knanaya Orthodox Archdiocese of Chingavanam.

The Archeparchy of Kottayam has the privilege to have two liturgical rites in the same Archeparchy. At present 15 parishes of the Archeparchy belong to the Syro-Malankara rite served mainly by Syro-Malankara Knanaya priests. These churches are organised as one forane headed by a vicar general from the same rite. At the request of the Archbishop of Kottayam Mathew Moolakkatt, and with the recommendation of the Synod of Bishops of the Syro-Malabar and Syro-Malankara churches, the Holy See appointed Syro-Malankara Vicar General Fr. George Kurisummoottil, as the Auxiliary Bishop of the Archeparchy of Kottayam on 29 August 2020 with the name Geevarghese Mar Aprem. Thus, the Archeparchy of Kottayam has two auxiliary bishops of two liturgical rites which is unusual in a diocese.

=== Kottayam Diocese ===
Pope Pius XI elevated the Vicariate Apostolic of Kottayam to an eparchy on 21 December 1923 and appointed Alexander Choolaparambil as its bishop. He established many churches and schools in the diocese including Christ the King Cathedral, Kottayam. He was pioneer in the reunion of Knanaya Jacobites to Catholic faith, getting permission from the Holy See to use the Syro-Malankara Rite, and in leading the migration to virgin land in Northern Malabar during the economically difficult time of the World War II. With the permission from Bishop Alexander Choolaparambil, Fr. Thomas Poothathil who had special concern for the poor, especially disabled children and women, founded Sisters of St Joseph Congregation (SJC) at Kaipuzha on 3 July 1928.

Pope Pius XII appointed Thomas Tharayil as co-adjutor bishop of Kottayam on 9 June 1945. His Episcopal Consecration was held at Christ the King Cathedral by Alexander Choolaparambil on 7 October 1945. When Choolaparambil died at the Bishop's House in Kottayam on 8 January 1951, Coadjutor Bishop Thomas Tharayil took charge as Bishop of Kottayam. Bishop Choolaparambil was buried at Christ the King Cathedral Kottayam.

The territorial limits of the Syro-Malabar Church was extended on 29 April 1955. With the directive of Pope Pius XII, the Oriental Congregation extended the jurisdiction of the Eparchy of Kottayam also to the then extended territory of the Syro-Malabar Church by its decree 1812/48 (Quae Suddistica Gens) Pope Pius XII elevated the Diocese of Changanacherry as an archdiocese and made Kottayam and Pala at its suffragan dioceses ("Regnum Caelorum") on 26 July 1956. Besides establishing new churches, Bishop Thomas Tharayil gave importance to education of the people and established schools and colleges. He also founded Caritas Secular Institute at Thellakom, Kottayam on 9 June 1961 for women.

Pope Paul VI appointed Kuriakose Kunnacherry as the Co-adjutor Bishop of Kottayam on 9 December 1967. His Episcopal Consecration was held at Sacred Heart Mount, Kottayam by the Prefect of the Oriental Congregation on 24 February 1968. When Thomas Tharayil retired on 5 May 1974, Co-adjutor Bishop Kuriakose Kunnacherry took charge as the Bishop of Kottayam. Thomas Tharayil died at the Chaplain's quarters of Caritas Hospital on 26 July 1975. He was buried at Christ the King Cathedral, Kottayam.

Considering the missionary zeal of Knanaya youth, Kunnacherry took initiative to establish Missionary Society of St. Pius X. Many priests volunteered to become its initial members. They were supported by Missionary Association of priests and lay people. The missionary society was established on 6 January 1985. Pope John Paul II blessed the foundation stone for the seminary of the Missionary Society on 8 February 1986 after the beatification ceremony of Blessed Kuriakose Elias Chavara and Blessed Alphonsa at Kottayam. The pope visited Bishop's house and Christ the King Cathedral at Kottayam on the same day.

Pope John Paul II appointed Mathew Moolakkatt as the Auxiliary Bishop of Kottayam on 28 December 1998. Pope John Paul II officiated the Episcopal Consecration of Mathew Moolakkatt along with other bishops at St. Peters Basilica in Vatican City on 6 January 1999. Mathew Moolakkatt as the Co-adjutor of the Diocese of Kottayam on 15 August 2003. Pope John Paul 11 made a sovereign decision on 23 December 2003, that the status quo (pro gente suddistica) of the Eparchy of Kottayam must be maintained and left it to the Bishops' Synod of the Syro-Malabar church to decide on the desired enhancement of the juridical status of the Eparchy of Kottayam.

=== Archeparchy of Kottayam ===
On 21 March 2005, the Congregation for the Oriental Churches issued a letter of no-objection to the decision of the Syro-Malabar Bishop's synod to elevate the Eparchy of Kottayam as an Archeparchy. Accordingly, on 9 May 2005 the Major Archbishop Varkey Cardinal Vithayathil issued the decree, "The Eparchy of Kottayam," elevating the Eparchy of Kottayam to the rank of a metropolitan see, and another decree "God our loving father," appointing Kuriakose Kunnacherry as its first metropolitan. On 3 June 2005, the feast of the Most Sacred Heart of Jesus, the Major Archbishop canonically erected the Metropolitan See of Kottayam and ordained and enthroned Kuriakose Kunnacherry as the Metropolitan of Kottayam. At the retirement of Archbishop Kuriakose Kunnacherry, Co-adjutor Bishop Mathew Moolakkatt took over as the Metropolitan of the Archdiocese of Kottayam on 14 January 2006.

Joseph Pandarasseril was appointed as the Auxiliary Bishop of Kottayam Archdiocese on 21 September 2006. His episcopal consecration was held on 28 October 2006 at Christ the King Cathedral, Kottayam by Kuriakose Kunnacherry.

The Knanaya Catholic community has two men who are in the process of sainthood. Former Vicar Apostolic of Kottayam Mathew Makil and Rev. Fr. Thomas Poothathil the founder of St. Joseph's Congregation, were declared Servants of God at Christ the King Cathedral, Kottayam on 26 January 2009.

Kuriakose Kunnacherry, the first Archeparchy of Kottayam died on 14 June 2017 at Thellakom, Kottayam. He was buried at Christ the King Cathedral beside the tomb of former bishops Alexander Choolaparambil and Thomas Tharayil.

The Archeparchy of Kottayam has a Syro-Malankara section who are descendants of the reunited Knanaya Jacobites. The Holy See appointed Fr. George Kurisummoottil as the Auxiliary Bishop of Kottayam on 29 August 2020. Fr. George who is of Syro-Malankara rite and vicar general of the Syro-Malankara faithful of the Archeparchy of Kottayam received his Ramban ordination on 7 November 2020 in preparation for his consecration as Auxiliary Bishop of Kottayam. Major Archbishop of Syro-Malankara Church Moran Mor Cardinal Baselios Cleemis officiated the service at St. Theresa's Knanaya Malankara Catholic Church, Ranni. The consecration of Fr. George, with the name Geevarghese Mor Aprem, was held at Christ the King Cathedral by Archbishop of Thiruvalla Thomas Mar Koorilos, along with Archbishop Mar Mathew Moolakkatt and Mar Joseph Pandarasseril on 14 November 2020.

== Bishops and archbishops ==
- Mathew Makil (1911–1914)
- Alexander Choolaparampil (1914–1951)
- Thomas Tharayil (1951–1974)
- Kuriakose Kunnacherry (1974–2006)
- Mathew Moolakkattu (2006–present)

Auxiliary Bishops

- Thomas Tharayil (1945–1951)
- Kuriakose Kunnacherry (1968–1974)
- Mathew Moolakkattu (1999–2006)
- Joseph Pandarasseril (2006–present)
- Gheevarghese Mar Aprem (2020–present)
- Thomas Animoottil (2026–present)

== Servants of God and Venerables ==
Two men from the Archeparchy are selected for the process of sainthood. As an initial step, they were declared as Servants of God at Christ the King Cathedral, Kottayam on 26 January 2009.

- Venerable Bishop Mathew Makil
- Servant of God Rev. Fr. Thomas Poothathil

== Pastoral structure ==
The following is an overview of the structural arrangement of the Archeparchy of Kottayam to offer pastoral service for the people.

=== General statistics ===
- Total Knanaya Catholics: 190,985 faithful and 39,984 families
- Within the Archeparchy: 132,332 faithful and 26,832 families
- Outside the Archeparchy: 58,653 faithful and 13,152 families
- Regions and Foranes: Two Regions (Kottayam and Malabar) and 14 Foranes
- Foranes of Kottayam Region: Edacat, Kaduthuruthy, Piravom, Uzhavoor, Kaipuzha, Kidangoor, Chunkom, Padamugham, Malankara
- Foranes of Malabar Region: Rajapuram, Madampam, Perikkalloor, Changaleri, Bangalore
- Parishes and Station Churches: 153
- Wayside Chapels:485
- Diocesan Priests: 148, Religious Priests serving in the diocese: 215
- Seminarians: Major Seminarians - 71, Minor Seminarians - 169, Minor Seminaries - 4

=== Pastoral institutions ===
The Archeparchy of Kottayam has four pastoral centers and one retreat center in different locations of the Archeparchy. Their names, year of establishment and location are as follows:

1. Chaithanya Pastoral Centre (1977), Thellakom, Kottayam Dt.
2. Barmariam Pastoral Centre (1983), Sreekandapuram, Kannoor Dt.
3. Pavana Pastoral Centre (2004), Mananthavady, Wayanad
4. Malkanaya Pastoral Centre (2010), Othara, Thiruvalla
5. Thuvanisa Prayer House and Retreat Centre (1982), Kothanalloor, Kottayam Dt.

=== Religious communities ===
For Men

1. Oblates of the Sacred Heart (OSH), Established in 1921, Houses 6, Priests 102
2. Vallambrosan Benedictine Order (OSB) Established in 1988, Houses 6, Priests 40
3. Order of Friars Minor (OFM Cap.) Houses 5, Priests 9
4. Salasians of Don Bosco (SDB) Houses 2, Members 6

For Women

1. Visitation Congregation (SVM) Established in 1892, Convents 95, Members 558
2. St. Joseph's Congregation (SJC) Established in 1928, Convents 65, Members 388
3. Caritas Secular Institute. Established in 1961, Houses 18, Members 120
4. Little Daughters of St. John Gualbert. Started in the Archeparchy in 1981, Convents 16, Members 80
5. Daughters of the Most Precious Blood. Started in the Archeparchy in 1989 Convents 6, Members 40
6. Sisters of Our Lady of Providence. Started in the Archeparchy in 1990 Convent 1, Members 3

== Pious associations ==
The following are the lay associations with units in parishes of the Archeparchy:

- St. Vincent de Paul Society - 113
- Legion of Mary - 79
- Cherupushpa Mission League - 116
- Knanaya Catholic Youth League (KCYL) - 115
- Holy Childhood - 87
- Secular Franciscan Order - 12
- Knanaya Catholic Congress (KCC) - 134
- Knanaya Catholic Women Association (KCWA) - 135
- Missionary Association of Knanaya Laity - 13
- Darsana Samooham - 11
- Forty & Twelve hours adoration -149

== Public service ==
=== Social service ===
The Archeparchy provides philanthropic service to all people who are in need of service, regardless of faith or ethnicity, through the local social service units and self-help groups established in association with all parishes and coordinated through three regional social service societies.

1. Kottayam Social Service Society (1964), Thellakom, Kottayam Dt.
2. Malabar Social Service Society (1992), Pallikunnu P.O., Kannur Dt.
3. Greenvalley Development Society (2010), Thadiyampad, Idukki Dt.

The support includes developmental, community based rehabilitation, welfare, and emergency aid programs. The societies organize and coordinate self-help groups, animation programs, micro-credit unions, job-oriented training, income generation programs, agricultural promotion, run day-care centers for the deaf-blind, and for the disabled.

- Day Care Centre - 1
- Home for Children - 1
- Homes for the aged - 7
- Training centre for deaf-blind - 1
- Training center for disabled - 1
- Homes for the disabled - 4
- Homes for the mentally challenged - 9

=== Education ===
- Colleges - 4
- Higher Secondary Schools - 16
- High Schools - 21
- Upper Primary Schools - 39
- Lower Primary Schools - 66
- Nursery (Pre) Schools - 87
- Boarding Houses - 6
- Hostels - 21

=== Job-oriented training ===
- Industrial Training Centre (ITC) - 1
- Polytechnic for girls - 1
- Industrial Schools - 38
- College / School of Nursing - 3
- College of Pharmacy - 1
- Multi Health Workers School - 1

=== Health ===
- Hospitals - 6
- Hospice - 1
- Dispensaries - 5

=== Media ===
- Fortnightly: Apna Des
- Sacred Heart Monthly (തിരുഹൃദയ മാസിക)

== Missionary service ==
Though Archeparchy of Kottayam is exclusively for Knanaya Catholics, the Archeparchy promotes vocation to missionary dioceses and religious congregations all over the world. There are more priests, religious sisters and brothers serving outside the Archeparchy than the number of priests and nuns serving in the Archeparchy. According to the statistics of 2017, when there are 244 diocesan and religious priests serving the Archeparchy, the number of Knanaya Catholic priests in the missions is 412 and missionary brothers 136. While there are 1,096 sisters belonging to the religious congregations of the Eparchy are serving in the Archeparchy and outside, 1,108 Knanaya Catholic Missionary Sisters are members of missionary congregations outside the Archeparchy.

- Apostolic Nuncio: 1
- Missionary Bishops: 2
- Missionary Priests: 478
- Missionary Brothers: 116
- Missionary Sisters: 1,144

=== Missionary prelates ===
The following are the Apostolic Nuncio, missionary archbishops and bishops who have served or serving in the Latin Archdioceses and dioceses:

1. Abraham Viruthakulangara (1977 - +2018)
2. George Palliparambil (2005 – present)
3. James Thoppil (2011 – present)
4. Simon Kaipuram (2014 - +2019)
5. Kurain Mathew Vayalunkal (Apostolic Nuncio) (2016–present)
6. Thomas Thenatt ( 2016 - +2018)

(+ indicates the end of service and the year of death)

== Knanaya in diaspora ==
Knanaya who have migrated from South Mesopotamia to South West India in 345 AD, kept migrating later to Northern part of Kerala, outside Kerala state in India, and other countries all over the world. Out of 190,985 Knanaya Catholics, 58,653 are now living outside the juridical boundary of the Archeparchy of Kottayam. According to familywise statistics, out of 39,984 Knanaya Catholic families, 13,152 are settled outside the jurisdiction of the Archeparchy. The Knanites in diaspora established Knanaya associations, chaplaincy, missions, and parishes wherever possible under the Latin hierarchy and later under Syro-Malabar dioceses. They keep in touch with the Archeparchy of Kottayam and receive service of priests sent by the Archbishop of Kottayam. The following are details of such Knanaya Catholic Associations and pastoral arrangements of Knanaya Catholics in diaspora.

=== Diaspora in India ===
New Delhi:The first diaspora Knanaya organization was the Delhi Knanaya Society established in 1975. There are around 600 Knanaya Catholic families and 400 youth in New Delhi area. Pope Benedict XVI established the Syro-Malabar Diocese of Faridabad with Kuriakose Bharanikulangara as Archbishop on 6 March 2012 for Syro-Malabar Catholics of Delhi, Haryana, Punjab, Himachal Pradesh, Jammu & Kashmir and districts of Ghaziabad and GautamBuddh Nagar (Naida) of Uttar Pradesh. So, the Knanaya Catholics in New Delhi area also came under this diocese. Archbishop Kuriakose Bharanikulangara established Knanaya Chaplaincy in the territory of his diocese for the pastoral care of the members of Delhi Knanaya Catholic Mission effective 22 March 2020. Fr. Chackochan Vandankuzhiyil and Fr. Joseph Vellapallikuzhiyil were appointed as the first Knanaya Chaplains.

Mumbai: Knanaya Catholic Society of Bombay was established in 1989. Around 120 Knanaya Catholic families and 300 youth live in Mumbai area. Knanaya Bhavan was established in Mumbai in 1998 with the financial support of the Diocese of Kottayam Pope John Paul II established the Eparchy of Kalyan on 30 April 1988 with Paul Chittilappilly as the first bishop for the Syro-Malabar Catholics with jurisdiction over 15 civil districts of Maharashtra with territorial co-extension with five Latin dioceses: the Archdiocese of Bombay, the Dioceses of Vasai, Poona, Nashik and Sindhudurg.

Other Cities in India: There are around 15 Knanaya Catholic families and 160 youth in Indore, 10 families and 25 youth in Jaipur, 30 families and 45 youth in Bhopal, and 40 families and 90 youth in Chennai. Other cities like Ahmadabad, Mangalore, and Calcutta also have Knanaya Catholic families and youth living for work or studies. Altogether there are around 1,000 Knanaya Catholic Families and 1,020 youth live in India outside the juridical territory of the Archeparchy of Kottayam. They have periodic get together and religious services under the auspices of local Knanaya Catholic associations. The director of diaspora ministry of the Archeparchy of Kottayam coordinate them in the national level.

=== United States ===
The Knanaya Catholics who migrated to the United States in the 1960s and later got organized as Knanaya Catholic Associations. There are 21 such organizations under the umbrella organization, Knanaya Catholic Congress of North America (KCCNA). With the support of Bishop Kuriakose Kunnacherry who sent priests from his diocese, the Latin bishops in the major cities of the United States started Knanaya Catholic Missions. The first mission was established in Chicago on 28 October 1983 with Fr. Jacob Chollampel as the director. The nine Knanaya Catholic Missions established by the Latin dioceses of the US before the establishment of the Syro-Malabar Catholic Diocese of Chicago in 2001 are: Chicago (1983), Brooklyn, NY (1993), Westchester and Bronx, NY (1993), Houston (1994), Dallas (1996), Newark, New Jersey (1996), Rockland, NY (1996), Philadelphia (1999), and San Jose (2000).

Pope John Paul II established the St. Thomas Syro-Malabar Catholic Diocese of Chicago in the US with Bishop Jacob Angadiath as its first bishop on 13 March 2001. Hence, all the Knanaya Catholics and Knanaya Catholic Missions in the US came under this diocese. Jacob Angadiath appointed Fr. Abraham Mutholath on 3 October 2001 as the Syncellus (Vicar General) of the Eparchy with special charge of Knanaya Catholics. When Jacob Angadiath structured the diocese as seven regions, one of them was for Knanaya Catholics. Angadiath inaugurated the Knanaya Region on 30 April 2006 and appointed Vicar General as the first region director.

Fr. Abraham Mutholath motivated the Knanaya Catholics all over United States to establish new Knanaya missions and to buy churches for the missions so that they can grow as parishes. The first Knanaya Catholic church of the diaspora Knanaites was established in Chicago on 3 September 2006 under the leadership of Vicar General Fr. Abraham Mutholath. Eventually Knanaya Catholic parishes and missions were established in more cities. Many of them have rectories, Knanaya cemeteries, and convents. There are 14 churches and 8 missions under the Knanaya Region that are served by 16 priests from the Archeparchy of Kottayam. They are structured under five foranes that were established on 28 February 2015. Around 35,000 Knanaya Catholics live in the US. Bishop Angadiath appointed Fr. Thomas Mulavanal as the vicar general and Knanaya Region director on 8 February 2014.

=== Other countries ===
Canada: Jacob Angadiath was the Apostolic Visitor of Canada from his inception as bishop of the St. Thomas Syro-Malabar Catholic Diocese of Chicago on 13 March 2001. So the Knanaya Catholics in Canada were under his pastoral care until the establishment of the Eparchy of Mississauga for the Syro-Malabar faithful in Canada on 6 August 2015 with Jose Kalluvelil as its exarch. At the recommendation of Jacob Angadiath, the first Knanaya Catholic Mission in Canada was established by the Archdiocese of Toronto in 2014 with Fr. George Parayil as the director. Jose Kalluvelil established Knanaya Catholic Directorate of Canada on 18 February 2018 and appointed Fr. Pathrose Champakkara as its director. The bishop appointed Fr. Pathrose Champakkara as Vicar General of the diocese on 22 September 2019. Around 252 Knanaya Catholic families live in Toronto and other cities of Canada and they have one parish and two missions served by two Knanaya Catholic priests.

Europe: Pope Francis established the Syro-Malabar Eparchy of Great Britain (for England, Scotland & Wales), with its see in Preston and Joseph Srampickal as the bishop on 28 July 2016. Around 1,700 Knanaya Catholic families in UK came under this eparchy. Bishop Srampickal appointed Fr. Saji Malayilputhenpurayil as the Vicar General in charge of the Knanaya Catholics. The community has four missions served by eight Knanaya Catholic priests.

Pope Francis appointed Stephen Chirappanath as the Apostolic Visitor for the Syro-Malabar faithful in Europe on 28 July 2016. Knanaya Catholics in Europe came under his pastoral guidance. The countries and the numbers of Knanaya Catholic families are: Italy - 650, Ireland - 160, Malta - 140, Germany - 125, Switzerland - 90, Austria - 55, and France - 30. Catholic priests from the Archeparchy of Kottayam are taking care of their pastoral needs.

Oceania: Pope established the Syro-Malabar Eparchy of St. Thomas, the Apostle, Melbourne, Australia on 11 January 2014 with Bosco Puthur as its first bishop and the Apostolic Visitor to New Zealand. Knanaya Catholics in Australia and New Zealand came under this diocese. There are around 1,060 Knanaya Catholic families in Australia, 120 in New Zealand, 20 in Singapore and 200 bachelors. Knanaya Catholics have one parish and two missions in Australia served by three priests from the Archeparchy of Kottayam.

Middle East: Though there are Knanaya Catholics from the Archeparchy of Kottayam living in different parts of the Middle East, the exact number is not available. There are around 500 people in Kuwait itself.

== Timeline ==
=== Before the vicariate ===
- 345: Alleged Migration to Kodungallur from South Mesopotamia under the leadership of Thomas of Kynai along with bishop Uraha Yausef, four priests, few deacons and 72 families.
- 345 – 1599: Knanaites (Suddists) and non-Knanaites (Northists) under the pastoral governance of bishops from the Chaldean church.
- 1599 June 20–26: Synod of Diamper.
- 1599 November 5: Francisco Ros. was nominated as the first Latin Bishop of Syrians.
- 1653 January 3: Coonan Cross Oath of the Syrians at Mattancherry, near Kochi against the Portuguese Padroado at the time of Archbishop Garcia S.J. that resulted in the division of the Syrians including the Knanaites.
- 1653 May 22: "Episcopal ordination" of the Archdeacon Thomas at Alangad by 12 St. Thomas Christian priests.
- 1665-71: Spread of Jacobite Faith by Gregorios in Malabar.
- 1877 November 15: The Syrians in the Archdiocese of Verapoly were brought under the pastoral leadership of Dr. Marcelinus Santa Thresia OCD, the Co-adjutor Bishop of Verapoly.
- 1887 May 20: Pope Leo XIII separated the Syrian Catholics from the Archdiocese of Verapoly and established two independent Vicariates of Kottayam (including Northists and Suddists) and Thrichur directly under the Holy See. Charles Lavigne was appointed as the Vicar Apostolic of Kottayam and Adolf Medlycott as the Vicar Apostolic of Thrichur. ("Quod Jam Pridem").
- 1890 September 16: Seat of Kottayam Vicariate was moved to Changanacherry.
- 1891 October 10: Bishop Charles Lavigne established eight foranes for the Northists, and Kottayam and Kaduthuruthy foranes for the Southists.
- 1892 June 24: Establishment of Sisters of the Visitation of the Blessed Virgin Mary (SVM) at Kaipuzha, Kottayam.
- 1896 July 28: Pope Leo XIII reconstituted the Vicariates of Changanacherry and Trichur by adding the Vicariate of Ernakulam with territories from Vicariates of Changanacherry and Thrissur. The new bishops were Aloysius Pazheparambil (Ernakulam), Mathew Makil (Changanacherry), and John Menachery (Thrissur). ("Quae Rei Sacrae").
- 1896 October 25: Episcopal Consecration of Mathew Makil, Aloysious Pazheparambil, and John Menachery at Kandy in Sri Lanka.

=== Vicariate ===
- 1911 August 29: Pope Pius X reestablished Kottayam Vicariate for the Knanaya (Suddists) Community of the Syrians (Pro Gente Sudhistica) who belonged to Changanacherry and Ernakulam vicariates ("In Universi Christiani") and appointed Mathew Makil as its first bishop.
- 1914 January 26: Death of Mathew Makil at Kottayam.
- 1914 July 16: Pope Pius X appointed Alexander Choolaparambil as the Vicar Apostolic of Kottayam.
- 1914 November 1: Episcopal consecration of the Bishop Alexander Choolaparambil in Kandy, Sri Lanka.
- 1921 January 29: Establishment of the Eparchial Society of the Oblates of the Sacred Heart (OSH) at S.H. Mount, Kottayam.
- 1921 July 5: Holy See allowed to use the Syro-Malankara liturgical rite for Knanaya Jacobites who joined the Roman Catholic Church.

=== Diocese ===
- 1923 December 21: Pope Pius XI elevated Kottayam vicariate as a diocese ("Romani Pondifices") and appointed Alexander Choolaparambil as its bishop.
- 1928 July 3: Foundation of Sisters of St Joseph Congregation (SJC) at Kottayam.
- 1945 June 9: Pope Pius XII appointed Thomas Tharayil as co-adjutor bishop of Kottayam.
- 1945 October 7: Episcopal Consecration of Thomas Tharayil at Christ the King Cathedral by Alexander Choolaparambil.
- 1951 January 8: Death of Alexander Choolaparambil at the Bishop's House in Kottayam. Coadjutor Bishop Thomas Tharayil took charge as Bishop of Kottayam.
- 1955 April 29: The personal jurisdiction of the Bishop of Kottayam was extended to the juridical territory of the Syro-Malabar church by a Decree of the Oriental Congregation 1812/48 as per the direction of Pope Pius XII. (Quae Suddistica Gens)
- 1956 July 26: Pope Pius XII elevated the Diocese of Changanacherry as an archdiocese and made Kottayam and Pala at its suffragan dioceses ("Regnum Caelorum").
- 1961 June 9: Establishment of Caritas Secular Institute at Thellakom, Kottayam.
- 1967 December 9: Pope Paul VI appointed Kuriakose Kunnacherry as the Co-adjutor bishop of Kottayam.
- 1968 February 24: Episcopal Consecration of Kuriakose Kunnacherry at Sacred Heart Mount, Kottayam by the Prefect of the Oriental Congregation.
- 1974 May 5: Thomas Tharayil retired. Co-adjutor Bishop Kuriakose Kunnacherry took charge as the Bishop of Kottayam.
- 1975 July 26: Death of Thomas Tharayil at the Chaplain's quarters of Caritas Hospital.
- 1977 July 13:Episcopal Ordination of Abraham Viruthakulangara as bishop of the New Diocese of Khandwa in Bhopal. He was the first Knanaya Missionary bishop.
- 1985 January 6: Establishment of the Missionary Society of St. Pius X.
- 1986 February 8: Pope John Paul II visited Bishop's house and Christ the King Cathedral at Kottayam after the beatification ceremony of Blessed Kuriakose Elias Chavara and Blessed Alphonsa.
- 1998 December 28: Pope John Paul II appointed Mathew Moolakkatt as the Auxiliary bishop of Kottayam.
- 1999 January 6: Episcopal Consecration of Mathew Moolakkatt at Vatican by Pope John Paul II.
- 2001 March 13: Pope John Paul II established the St. Thomas Syro-Malabar Catholic Diocese of Chicago in the US with Bishop Jacob Angadiath as its first bishop. All the Knanaya Catholics and their missions in the US came under this diocese.
- 2003 August 15: Appointment of Mathew Moolakkatt as the Co-adjutor of the Diocese of Kottayam.

=== Archdiocese ===
- 2005 May 9: Eparchy of Kottayam was made Archeparchy and Kuriakose Kunnacherry was elevated as the Archbishop of Kottayam by Varkey Vithayathil with the approval of the Holy See.
- 2005 June 3: Kuriakose Kunnacherry's official elevation as the Archbishop of Kottayam by Major Archbishop Cardinal Varkey Vithayathil.
- 2005 December 7: George Palliparambil from Mrala parish was appointed as the bishop of Miao in Arunachal Pradesh.
- 2006 January 14: Mathew Moolakkatt took charge as the Archbishop of Kottayam.
- 2006 September 21: Appointment of Joseph Pandarasseril as the auxiliary bishop of Kottayam Archdiocese.
- 2006 October 28: Episcopal consecration of Joseph Pandarasseril by Kuriakose Kunnacherry.
- 2009 January 26: Declaration of the Servants of God Mathew Makil and Rev. Fr. Thomas Poothathil at Christ the King Cathedral, Kottayam.
- 2011 September 8: Episcopal consecration of James Thoppil from Arunoottimangalam parish. He took charge as the bishop of Kohima, Nagaland.
- 2012 March 6: Establishment of the Syro-Malabar Diocese of Faridabad.
- 2014 January 30: Episcopal consecration of Simon Kaipuram from Kannamkara parish as bishop of Balasore.
- 2014 January 11: Announcement of the erection of the Syro-Malabar Eparchy of St. Thomas, the Apostle, Melbourne, Australia and the appointment of Bishop Bosco Puthur as its first bishop and the Apostolic Visitor to New Zealand. Knanaya Catholics in Australia and New Zealand came under this diocese.
- 2015 August 6:Establishment of the Apostolic exarch of Canada with Jose Kalluvelil as bishop with See at Mississauga. Knanaya Catholics in Canada came under this exarchate.
- 2016 May 3: Appointment of Kurian Mathew Vayalunkal from Neendoor parish as the Apostolic nuncio to Papua New Guinea and Solomon Islands.
- 2016 July 25: Episcopal consecration of nuncio for Holy See Mathew (Biju) Vayalumkal at Christ the King Cathedral.
- 2016 July 28: Pope Francis established the Syro-Malabar Eparchy of Great Britain (for England, Scotland & Wales), with its see in Preston and Joseph Srampickal as the bishop. Knanaya Catholics in UK came under his pastoral jurisdiction.
- 2016 July 28: Mar. Stephen Chirappanath was appointed as the Apostolic Visitor for the Syro-Malabar faithful in Europe. Knanaya Catholics in Europe came under his pastoral guidance.
- 2016 October 18: Appointment of Thomas Thennatt from Koodalloor parish as Bishop of Gwalior.
- 2017 June 14: Death of Archbishop Kuriakose Kunnacherry.
- 2017 October 9: Syro-Malabar church received the right for evangelization and pastoral service all over India.
- 2018 April 19: Death of Abraham Viruthakulangara, Archbishop of Nagpur.
- 2018 December 14: Death of Thomas Thenatt, bishop of Gwalior, Bhopal.
- 2019 April 22: Death of Simon Kaipuram, Bishop of Balasore.
- 2020 August 29: Announcement of Fr. George Kurisummoottil as the Auxiliary Bishop of Kottayam.
- 2020 November 7: Ramban ordination of Bishop elect Fr. George Kurisummoottil in preparation for his consecration as Auxiliary Bishop of Kottayam. Major Archbishop of Syro-Malankara Church Moran Mor Baselius Clemius officiated the service at St. Theresa's Knanaya Catholic Church, Ranni.
- 2020 November 14: Consecration of Auxiliary Bishop Gevarghese Mor Aprem at Christ the King Cathedral by Archbishop of Thiruvalla Thomas Curilos, along with Archbishop Mathew Moolakkatt and Joseph Pandarasseril.

== Uniqueness of the archeparchy ==
1. It is exclusively for Knanaya Catholics, an ethnic community that has special customs and traditions since 345 AD.
2. It has Syro-Malabar and Syro-Malankara bishops within one Archdiocese.
3. The metropolitan of the archdiocese has personal jurisdiction on all the Knanaya Catholics within the proper territory of the Syro-Malabar church.
4. The Knanaya Catholics who live all over the world consider the Archbishop of Kottayam as their tribal chief.
5. The Archbishop of Kottayam provides priests from the archdiocese to take care of the pastoral needs of all the Knanaya Missions and Parishes outside the proper territory of the Archdiocese (Syro-Malabar Church).

== See also ==
- Malankara Syriac Knanaya Archdiocese
- Knanaya Region
- Knanaya

== Bibliography ==
- Choolaparambil, Mar Alexander (Ed), (1925) Pastoral Letters, കാലം ചെയ്ത ഡോക്ടർ ലവീഞ്ഞ്, ഡോക്ടർ മാക്കീൽ എന്നീ വന്ദ്യ പിതാക്കന്മാർ തങ്ങളുടെ ഭരണകാലത്തു പ്രസിദ്ധപ്പെടുത്തിയിട്ടുള്ളത്. Kottayam: The Catholic Diocese of Kottayam.
- Baum, Wilhelm; Winkler, Dietmar W. (2003). The Church of the East: A Concise History. London-New York: Routledge-Curzon. ISBN 978-1-134-43019-2.
- Frykenberg, Robert (2010). Christianity in India: From Beginnings to the Present. Oxford University Press. ISBN 978-0-19-957583-1.
- Karukaparambil, George (2005). Marganitha Kynanaitha: Knanaya Pearl. Deepika Book House. ASIN B076GCH274.
- Kochadampallil, Mathew (2019). Southist Vicariate of Kottayam. Media House Delhi. ISBN 978-93-87298-66-8.
- Kollaparambil, Jacob (1966). The Archdeacon of All-India, A Historcio-Juridical Study. Rome: Pontificia Universitas Lateranensis.
- Kollaparambil, Jacob (1992). The Babylonian origin of the Southists among the St. Thomas Christians. Pontifical Oriental Institute. ISBN 88-7210-289-8.
- Kollaparambil, Rev. Jacob (1981). The St. Thomas Christians' Revolution in 1653. Kottayam: The Catholic Bishop's House.
- Kollaparambil, Jacob (2015). Sources of the Syro Malabar Law. Oriental Institute of Religious Studies India. ISBN 9789382762287.
- Kottayam, The Archeparchy (2017). The Archeparchy of Kottayam Directory 2017.
- Makil, Mathew (2001). കോട്ടയം മിസത്തിന്റെ സ്ഥാപന ചരിത്രം. Kottayam: Bishop Makil Foundation.
- Malekandathil, Pius (2003). Jornada of D. Alexis Menezes: A Portuguese Account of the Sixteenth Century Malabar. LRC Publications. ISBN 81-88979-00-7.
- Moolakkatt, Archbishop Mathew (2006), "കോട്ടയം അതിരൂപത: ഉത്ഭവവും വളർച്ചയും" സുവർണ്ണസ്മൃതി, Golden Jubilee Souvenir, Changanacherry: Archeparchy of Changanacherry, pp. 389–392.
- Moolakkatt, Mar Mathew (2009). The Book of Decrees of Mar Mathew Makil. Bangalore: Syrian Churches Series XXI.
- Mundadan CMI, A Mathias (1970). Sixteenth Century Traditions of St. Thomas Christians. Bangalore: Dharmaram College.
- Mundadan CMI, A.M. (1986). "What the Leadership of Thomas Cana (and the People who possibly came with him) gave to the Early Christian Community in India," Symposium on Knanites. Kottayam: Diocese of Kottayam.
- Mutholath, Fr. Abraham (Ed.) (1986). കോട്ടയം രൂപത പ്ലാറ്റിനം ജൂബിലി സ്മരണിക 1911-1986. Kottayam: Diocese of Kottayam.
- Mutholath, Fr. Abraham (2020). പ്രവാസി ക്നാനായ സഭാശുശ്രൂഷയിലെ വെല്ലുവിളികൾ. Chicago, IL: Knanaya Region.
- Neill, Stephen (2004). A History of Christianity in India: The Beginnings to AD 1707. Cambridge University Press. ISBN 0-521-54885-3.
- Podipara CMI, Placid J. (1970). The Thomas Christians. Bombay: St. Paul Publications.
- Podipara, Placid (1971). The Varthamanappusthakam. Pontifical Oriental Institute. ISBN 978-81-264-5152-4.
- Swiderski, Richard Michael (1988). "Northists and Southists: A Folklore of Kerala Christians". Asian Folklore Studies. 47 (1). Nanzan University: 73–92. doi:10.2307/1178253. JSTOR 1178253.
- Swiderski, Richard Michael (1988). Blood Weddings: The Knanaya Christians of Kerala. Madras: New Era. ISBN 978-0-8364-2454-6.
- Thodathil, James (2005). Antiquity and Identity of the Knanaya Community. Knanaya Clergy Association. ASIN B000M1CEDI.
- Vellian, Fr. Jacob (2001). Knanite Community History and Culture. Kottayam: Syrian Church Series, Vol. XVII.
- Vellian, Jacob (1986). Symposium on Knanites. Syrian Church Series. Vol. 12. Jyothi Book House.
- Vellian, Jacob (1990). Crown, Veil, Cross: Marriage Rights. Syrian Church Series. Vol. 15. Anita Printers. OCLC 311292786.
- Weil, Shalva (1982). "Symmetry between Christians and Jews in India: The Cananite Christians and Cochin Jews in Kerala". Contributions to Indian Sociology. 16 (2): 175–196. doi:10.1177/006996678201600202. S2CID 143053857.
- "ക്നാനായ കുടിയേറ്റവും കോട്ടയം രൂപതയും," കോട്ടയം രൂപത പ്ലാറ്റിനം ജൂബിലി സ്മരണിക 1911 - 1986. Kottayam: Diocese of Kottayam. 1986.
- കോട്ടയം അതിരൂപത ശതാബ്ദി സ്മരണിക 1911-2011. Kottayam: Archeparchy of Kottayam. 2012.
