= Syro-Malabar Catholic Eparchy of Great Britain =

Eastern Catholic diocese in Great Britain

Eparchy of Great Britain
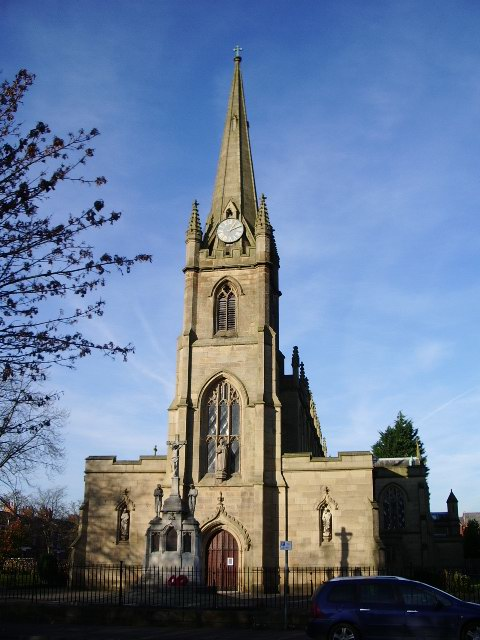
- Syro-Malabar Cathedral of Marth Alphonsa, Preston (formerly St. Ignatius Church)

- Logo of the eparchy

Location
- Country: Great Britain
- Territory: England and Wales & Scotland

Statistics
- Area: 229,848 km^{2} (88,745 sq mi)
- Population: Total; Catholics: (as of 2013); 60,003,000; 38,000

Information
- Denomination: Catholic Church
- Sui iuris church: Syro-Malabar Catholic Church
- Rite: East Syriac Rite
- Established: 28 July 2016; 9 years ago
- Cathedral: Syro-Malabar Cathedral of St Alphonsa in Preston
- Secular priests: 23

Current leadership
- Pope: Leo XIV
- Major Archbishop: Mar Raphael Thattil
- Eparch: Mar Joseph Srampickal

Website
- www.eparchyofgreatbritain.org

The Eparchy of Great Britain is the sole Syro-Malabar Catholic Church ecclesiastical territory or eparchy of the Catholic Church in Great Britain. Its cathedral is Syro-Malabar Cathedral of St Alphonsa in the episcopal see of Preston, Lancashire. This eparchy is exempt, that is, not part of any ecclesiastical province in the Latin Catholic Church, but immediately subject to the Major Archbishop of the Syro-Malabar Church, under the supervision of the Congregation for the Oriental Churches. It has jurisdiction over Syro-Malabar Catholics in the entirety of Great Britain: England, Scotland and Wales (the United Kingdom minus Northern Ireland). Most of the faithful of this eparchy are British Indians with heritage in Kerala, where the Syro-Malabar Church is historically based.

The British eparchy, established in 2016, is the Syro-Malabar Catholic Church's fourth diocesan jurisdiction outside India, after the eparchies of Mississauga (Canada), Chicago (United States) and Melbourne (Australia). The Syro-Malabar Catholic Church also has an Apostolic Visitor for Europe based in Rome, Bishop Mar Stephen Chirapanath, who oversees and ensures liaison between the pastoral missions and Mass centres in other parts of Europe, including Northern Ireland.

== Location and structure ==
The eparchy has chaplains (mostly Indian) in territory that overlaps geographically the territories of the 30 Latin Catholic dioceses of Great Britain, namely, the 22 dioceses of the Catholic Church in England and Wales, and the 8 dioceses of the Catholic Church in Scotland but has status that is canonically independent of them. Its internal organization features a national coordination council and eight diocesan departments: Liturgy, Finance, Catechism, Faith Formation, Lay Association, Resolution Committee and Youth Association. Its first and present eparch is Mar Joseph Srampickal.

== Bishops ==
Sl.No	Ordinary	Designation	Year of appointment	Last year of service
1	Mar Joseph Srampickal	Bishop	9th October 2016	Present

== See also ==
- List of Catholic dioceses in Great Britain

== Sources and external links ==
- GCatholic.org
- Official site
