= Thomas Tharayil (bishop of Kottayam) =

Indian eparchial bishop

Mar Thomas Tharayil
- Bishop of Kottayam
- Archdiocese: Syro-Malabar Catholic Archeparchy of Kottayam
- See: Kottayam
- Appointed: 9 June 1945
- Installed: 8 January 1951
- Term ended: 5 May 1974
- Predecessor: Mar Alexander Choolaparampil
- Successor: Mar Kuriakose Kunnacherry
- Previous posts: Headmaster, S.H. Mount High School, Kottayam

Orders
- Ordination: 18 December 1926
- Consecration: 7 October 1945 by Mar Alexander Choolaparampil

Personal details
- Born: 5 May 1899 Kaipuzha, Kerala, India
- Died: 16 July 1975 (aged 76) Thellakom Kottayam, India
- Education: Propaganda College, Rome
- Motto: Omnes Unum Sint

Thomas Tharayil (5 May 1899 – 26 July 1975) was an eparchial bishop of the Knanaya Catholic Eparchy of Kottayam, belonging to the Syro-Malabar Church. He was born in Kaipuzha, India. He is buried in Christ the King Cathedral Kottayam.
