= Joseph Srampickal =

Indian Syro-Malabar Catholic bishop (born 1967)

Mar Joseph Srampickal
- Syro-Malabar Bishop of Great Britain
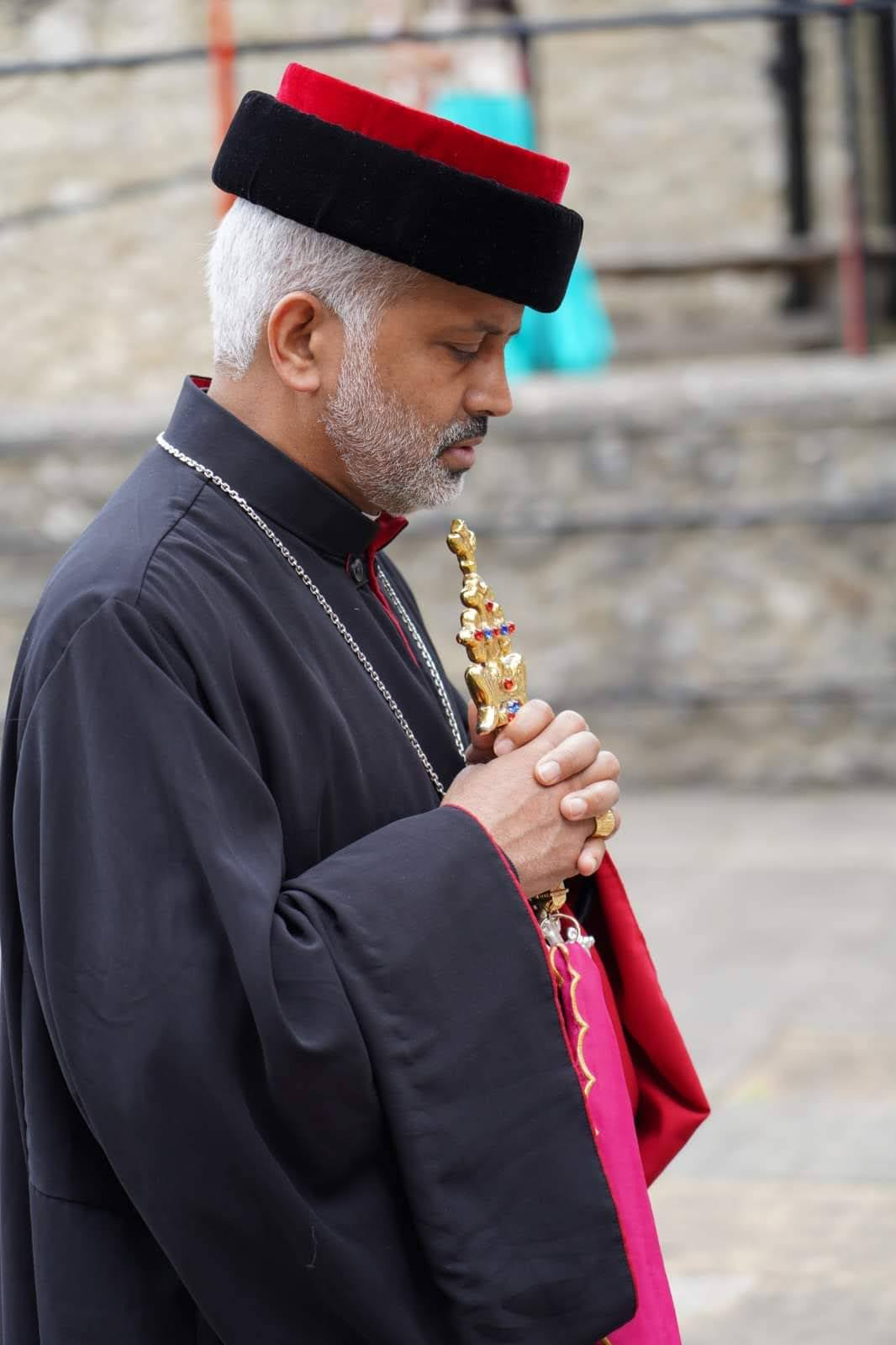
- Mar Joseph Srampickal at Walsingham Pilgrim Church
- Native name: ܝܵܘܣܸܦ ܣܪܵܡܦܝܿܟܲܠ
- Church: Syro-Malabar Catholic Church
- Diocese: Eparchy of Great Britain
- See: Preston
- Appointed: 28 July 2016
- Installed: 9 October 2016

Orders
- Ordination: 12 August 2000
- Consecration: 9 October 2015 by George Alencherry

Personal details
- Born: 30 May 1967 (age 59) Kerala, India
- Education: St. Thomas Apostolic Seminary; Pontifical Urbaniana University; University of Oxford

Joseph Srampickal is an Indian Catholic prelate serving as the first bishop of the Syro-Malabar Catholic Eparchy of Great Britain, which had been elected by Pope Francis in 2016.

== Early life ==
Joseph Srampickal was born on 30 May 1967 in Poovarany, in the Eparchy of Palai.

== Education ==
Srampickal studied philosophy at St. Thomas Apostolic Seminary, Vadavathoor, and theology at the Pontifical Urbaniana University in Rome, where he obtained a licentiate in biblical theology. He continued his studies at the University of Oxford.

== Priesthood ==
Ordained a priest on 12 August 2000, Srampickal has held the following positions: professor at the minor seminary and Ephrem Formation Centre of Pala, Director of the Mar Sleeva Nursing College, Director of the Evangelization Programme, secretary of the bishop; and pastor at Urulikunnam. From 2013, he was Vice Rector of the Pontifical Urbaniana College of the Propaganda Fide, Rome.

== Episcopate ==
Srampickal was appointed Bishop of the Syro-Malabar Catholic Eparchy of Great Britain on 28 July 2016 by Pope Francis and ordained bishop on 9 October 2016 by George Alencherry.
