= Kuriakose Kunnacherry =

Syro-Malabar Catholic hierarch (1928–2017)

Mar Kuriakose Kunnacherry
- Metropolitan Archbishop Emeritus of Archeparchy of Kottayam
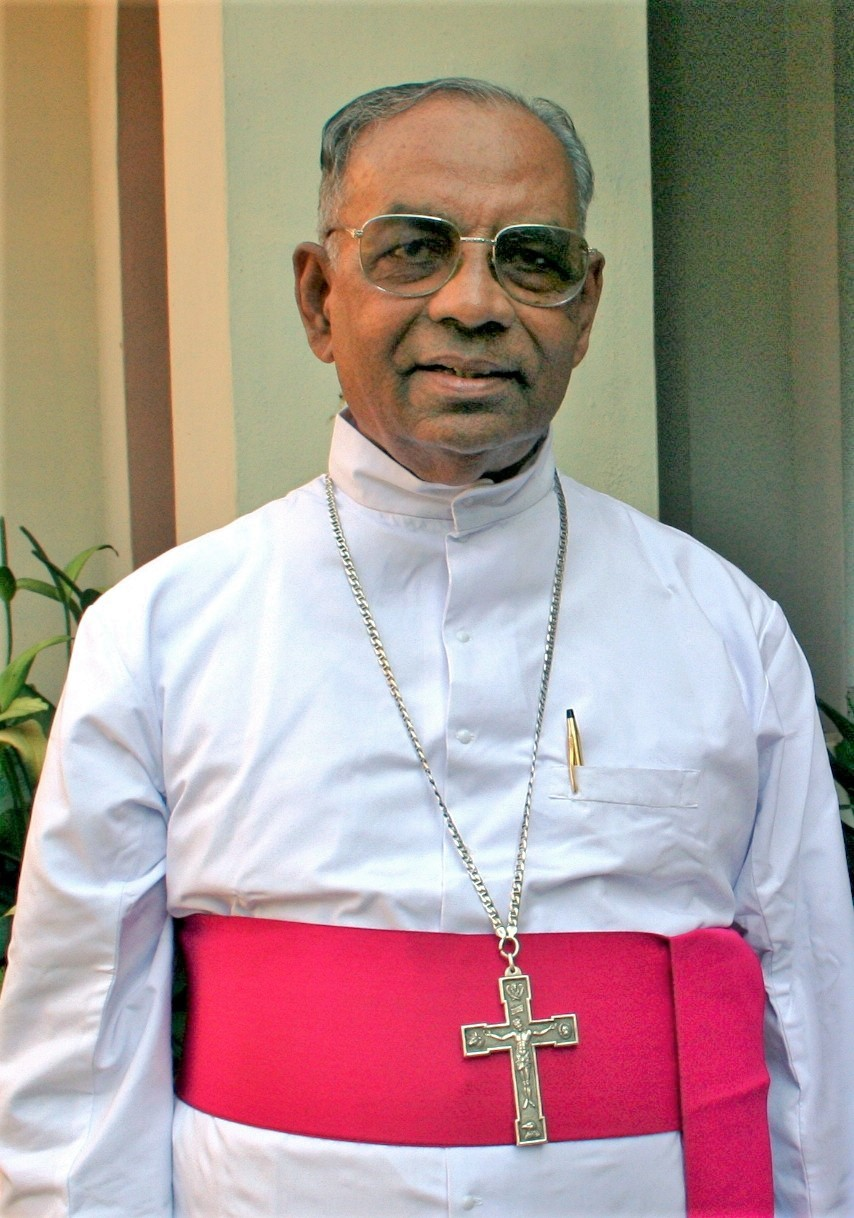
- Archdiocese: Syro Malabar Archeparchy of Kottayam
- Appointed: 24 February 1968
- Installed: 19 May 1974
- Term ended: 19 January 2006
- Predecessor: Mar Thomas Tharayil
- Successor: Mar Mathew Moolakkatt

Orders
- Ordination: 21 December 1955 by Clement Cardinal Miccara in Rome
- Consecration: 24 February 1968 by Maximillian Cardinal de Furstenberg at S.H. Mount. Kottayam

Personal details
- Born: 11 September 1928 Pazhuthuruth Kaduthuruthy, Kerala, India
- Died: 14 June 2017 (aged 88) Thellakom Kottayam, India
- Education: Potinfical Seminary, Alwaye

Kuriakose Kunnassery (11 September 1928 – 14 June 2017) was a Syro-Malabar Catholic hierarch. He was the fourth bishop of the Syro-Malabar Catholic Archeparchy of Kottayam and the first Archbishop of the Archdiocese of Kottayam. He served as priest in the Diocese of Kottayam for 13 years from 21 December 1955 to 24 February 1968. Then he was bishop for 49 years from 24 February 1968 to 14 June 2017. Kunnacherry was head of the Diocese of Kottayam for 31 years from 5 May 1974 to 19 December 2005. He was elevated as Archbishop on 19 May 2005.

As a bishop and Archbishop of Kottayam, Kunnacherry took initiative to establish many churches, charitable, and welfare institutions in various parts of Kerala. He also took initiative in establishing missions in various parts of the world for the Knanaya migrants. Kunnacherry served the Catholic church in various capacities and also was a leader of ecumenical movement in Kerala.

== Biography ==
He was born at Pazhuthurthu near Kaduthuruthy, Kerala State, India, as the son of Joseph and Annamma in Kunnacherry family on 11 September 1928. After his studies, he was ordained as a priest in Rome on 21 December 1955. He was ordained as a bishop on 24 February 1968 at Sacred Heart Mount, Kottayam. He was elevated as Archbishop of Kottayam on 3 June 2005. He died on 14 June 2017 at Thellakom, Kottayam. His funeral services were officiated by Mar George Alencherry, the major archbishop of the Syro-Malabar Church, at Christ the King cathedral Kottayam where he was buried on 17 June 2017.

=== Education ===
Kunnacherry had his basic education at St. George Lower Primary School, Edacat from 1934-1936, C.N.I. Lower Primary School, Kottayam from 1936-1938, St. Michael's Upper Primary School, Kaduthuruthy from 1938-1943.

After high school studies, Kunnacherry joined St. Stanislaus Minor Seminary at Sacred Heart Mount, Kottayam in 1946. Then he studied at St. Joseph's Pontifical Seminary, Alwaye from 1948 to 1952. He continued his priestly formation in Pontifical Urbanian University from 1952 to 1956. During this time he gained Baccalaureate in Theology in 1954 and Licentiate in Theology in 1956.

After becoming a priest in 1955, Kunnacherry had his higher studies in Pontifical Lateran University Rome from 1956 to 1960. During this period, he received Licentiate in Civil and Canon Laws in 1958 and Doctorate in Civil and Canon Laws in 1960. He later studied at Boston College, USA from 1962 to 1964 and gained master's degree in Political Science in 1964.

=== Priestly Service ===
After Kunnacherry's ordination as priest and return from Rome, Bishop Mar Thomas Tharayil appointed him as the Chancellor of the Diocese of Kottayam. He served in that capacity from 1960 to 1968. He also served as bishop's secretary, Cathedral assistant, and Editorial Board member of Apna Des and Sacred Heart Monthly (publications of the diocese) from 1960-1962. Kunnacherry was the managing editor of Apna Des from 1964 to 1965.

Kunnacherry was director of Caritas School of Nursing, member of Caritas Hospital board of administration, and Spiritual counsellor of Caritas Secular Institute from 1965 to 1968.

Kunnacherry served as the rector of St. Stanisalus Minor Seminary from 12 June 1967 until he was ordained as coadjutor bishop of Kottayam in 1968.

=== Episcopal Service ===
Kunnacherry became Coadjutor Bishop of Kottayam in 1967. That same year he was appointed Titular Bishop of Cephas. In May 1974 he became bishop of Kottayam, becoming the archbishop of that same territory in 2005.

== Bibliography ==
- Mutholath, Abraham; Karakkattu, Bijo, eds. (1993). Jubilee Smruthi, Episcopal Silver Jubilee Souvenir of Mar Kuriakose Kunnacherry. Kottayam: Jyothi Book House.
- Karukaparambil, George (2005). Margaritha Kynanaitha. Kottayam: Jyothi Book House.
- Abraham, Mutholath, ed. (1986). The Diocese of Kottayam Platinum Jubilee Souvenir 1911-1986. Kottayam: Jyothi Book House.
- Poothrukayil, Luke, ed. (1999). Episcopal Consecration Souvenir of Mar Mathew Moolakkatt. Kottayam: Jyothi Book House.
- Chemmachel, Joy, ed. (2008). Silver Jubilee Souvenir, Knanaya Catholic Mission, Chicago. Chicago: Sacred Heart Knanaya Catholic Parish.
