= Mathew Moolakkatt =

Knanaya Catholic Archbishop

Mar Mathew Moolakkattu Metropolitan
- Archbishop of Kottayam
- Church: Syro-Malabar Catholic Church
- Archdiocese: Kottayam
- See: Kottayam
- Appointed: 12 December 2005
- Predecessor: Kuriakose Kunnacherry

Orders
- Ordination: 27 December 1978
- Consecration: 6 January 1999 by John Paul II
- Rank: Metropolitan

Personal details
- Born: 27 February 1953 (age 73)

Mar Mathew Moolakkatt (27 February 1953), a Knanaya Catholic Archbishop was born in Uzhavoor, India. Currently he is Archbishop of Syro-Malabar Catholic Archeparchy of Kottayam, succeeding Kuriakose Kunnacherry upon his retirement, he is a member of the Order of St. Benedict. He was entrusted the whole Knanaya catholic community in 2006 January. His mother parish is St. Stephen's forane church uzhavoor. He was the synodal commission chairman of St. Thomas apostolic seminary Vadavathoor. He is one of the members of the permanent synod of the Syro Malabar Catholic Church
