= Sacred Heart Knanaya Catholic Church Chicago =

Catholic church in Chicago, Illinois

SHKC Parish, Chicago
- Sacred Heart Kananaya Catholic Church, Chicago
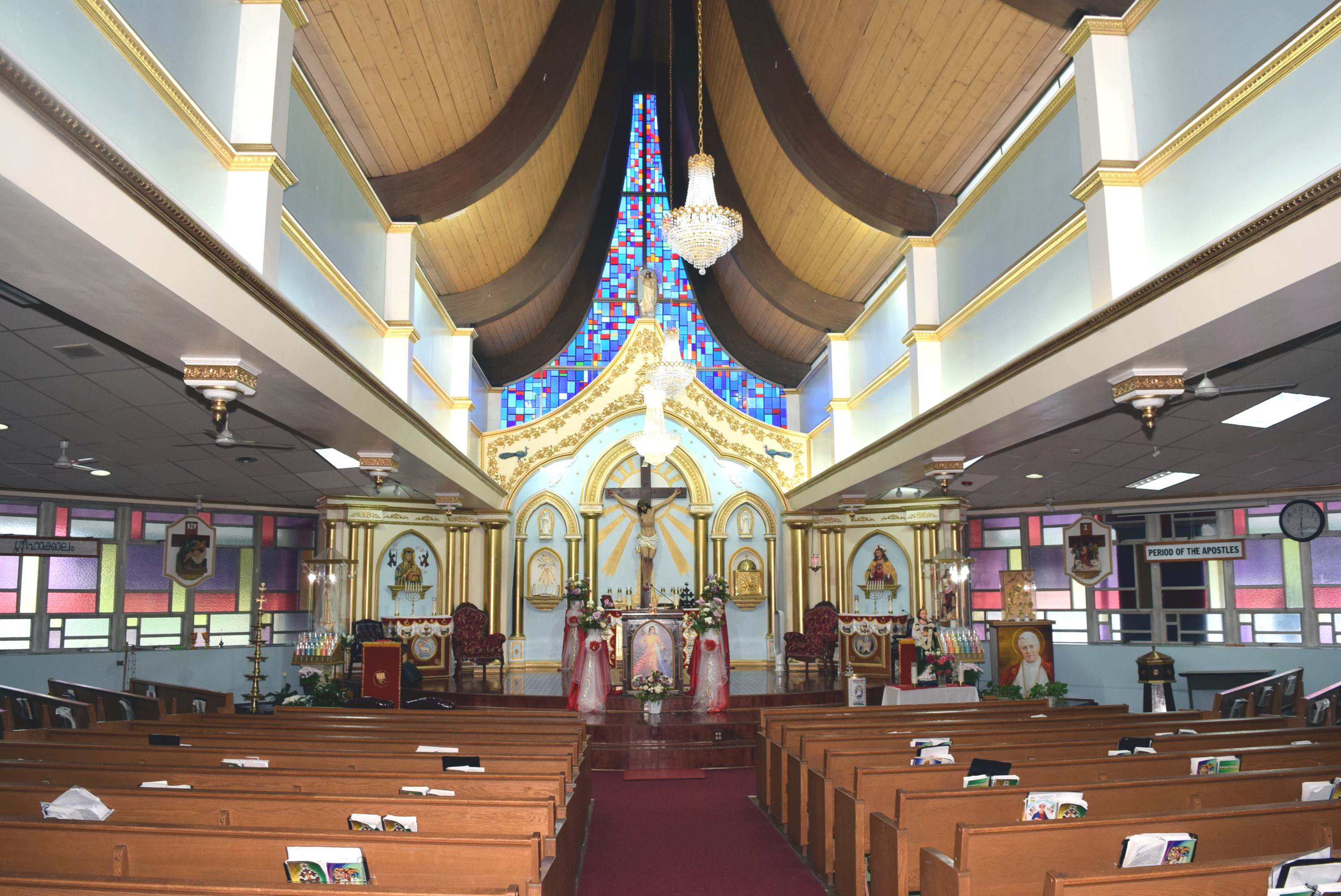
- Location: Maywood, Illinois, US
- Country: United States
- Denomination: Knanaya Catholic
- Tradition: Syro-Malabar Rite in Malayalam & English
- Website: www.shkcparish.us

History
- Former name: Knanaya Catholic Mission
- Status: Forane Church
- Founded: 1 September 2006
- Dedication: Sacred Heart of Jesus
- Events: * 28 October 1983: Mission Started; * 3 September 2006: Church Inaugurated; * 24 September 2006: Elevated as Parish; * 22 March 2015: Elevated as Forane Church.

Administration
- Diocese: Syro-Malabar Catholic Diocese of Chicago

Clergy
- Bishop(s): Mar Jacob Angadiath and Mar Joy Alappatt
- Priest: Fr. Abraham Mutholath

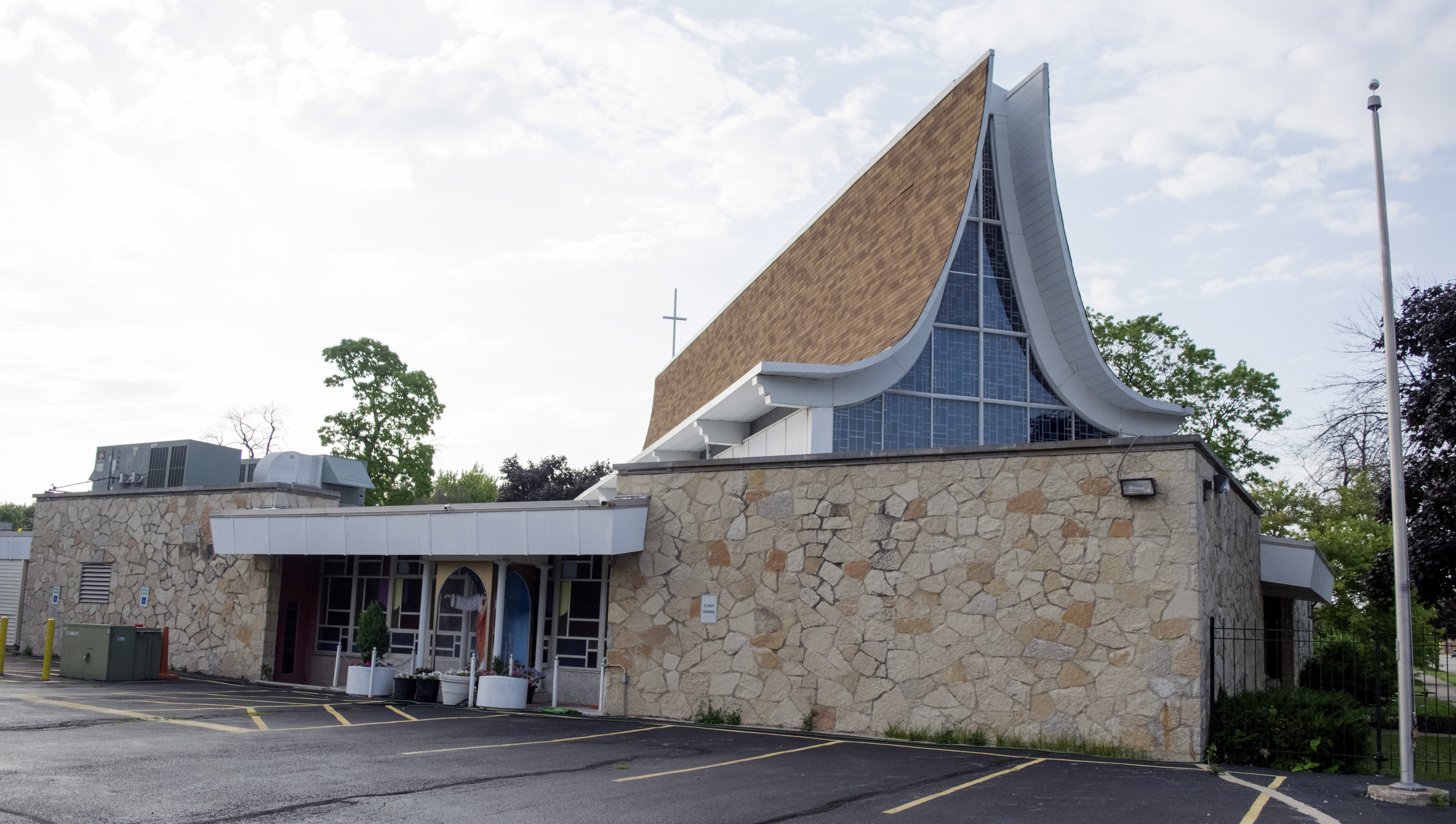
Exterior view of Chicago Sacred Heart Knanaya Catholic Church, the first church of the Knanaya Catholics in diaspora.

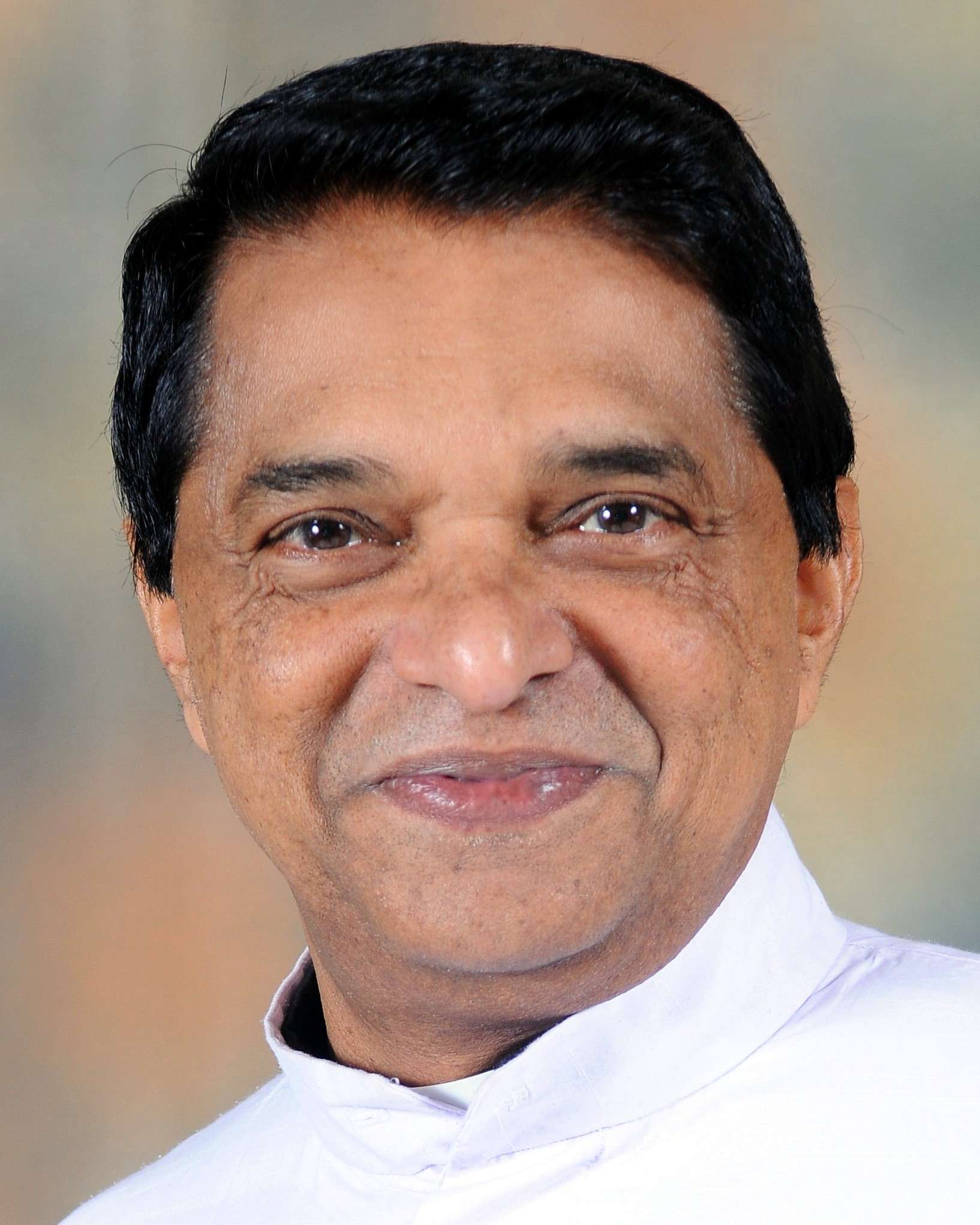
Fr. Abraham Mutholath, the founding pastor of the parish.

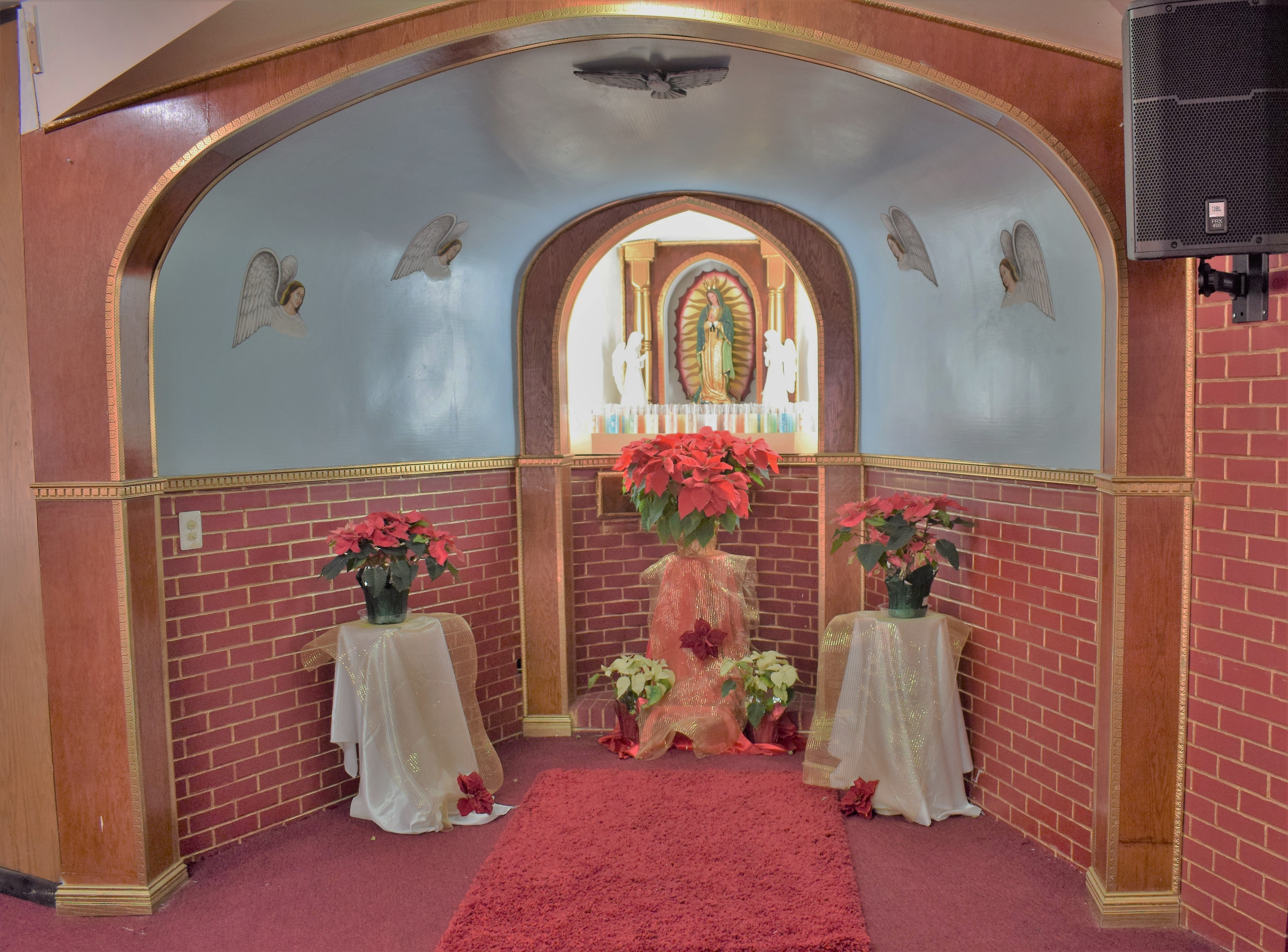
Shrine of Our Lady of Guadalupe inside the SHKC Church.

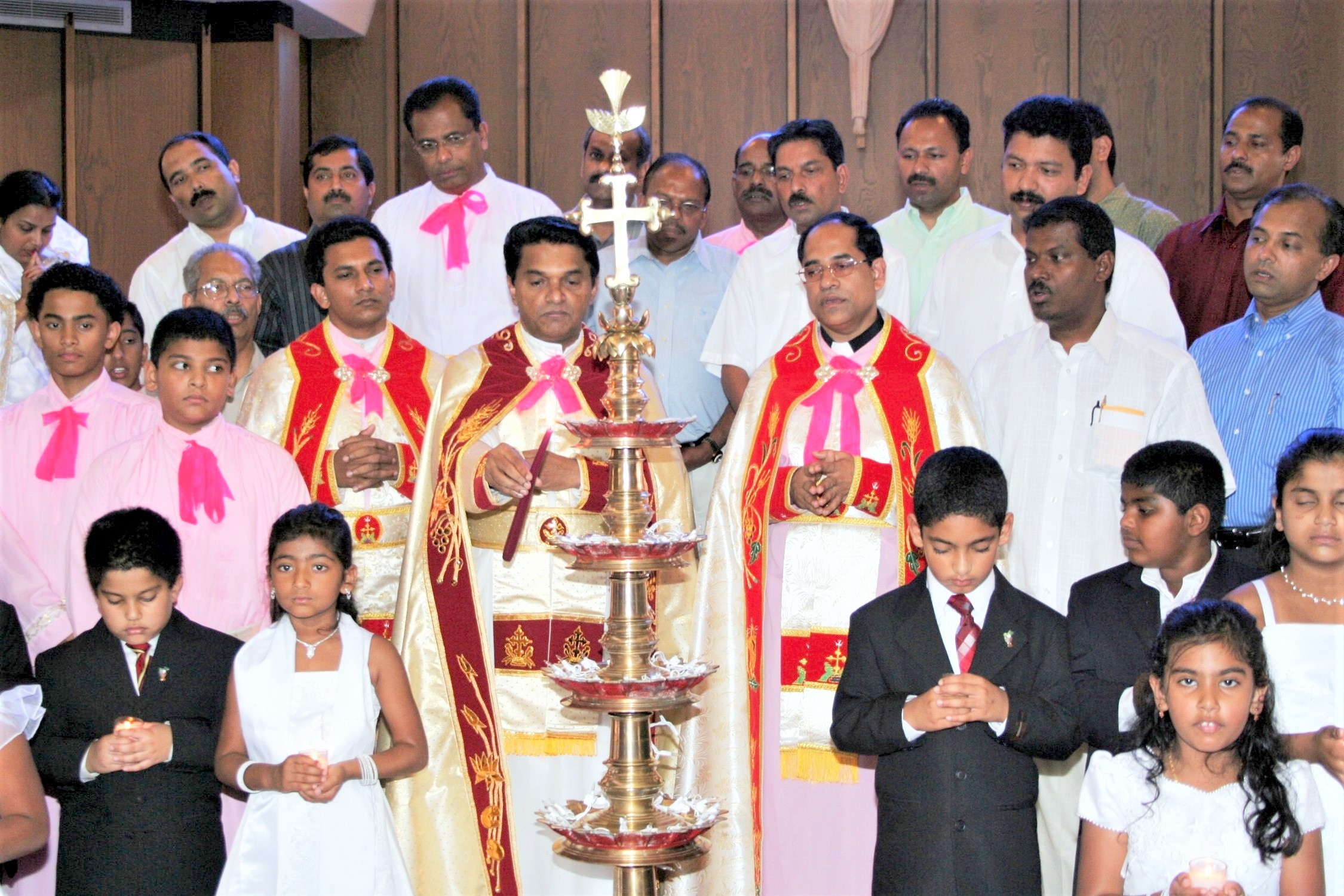
Fr. Abraham Mutholath inaugurating the Sacred Heart Knanaya Catholic Church on 3 September 2006.

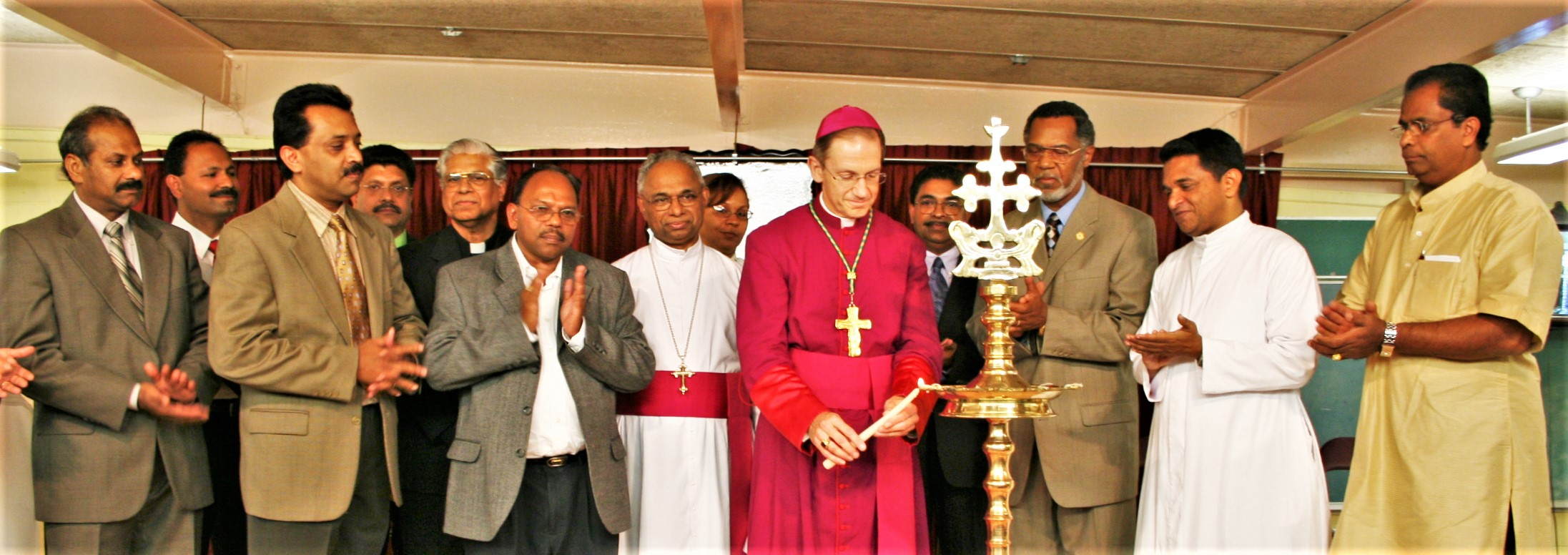
SHKC Parish inauguration on 24 September 2006 by Bishop Thomas Paprocki.

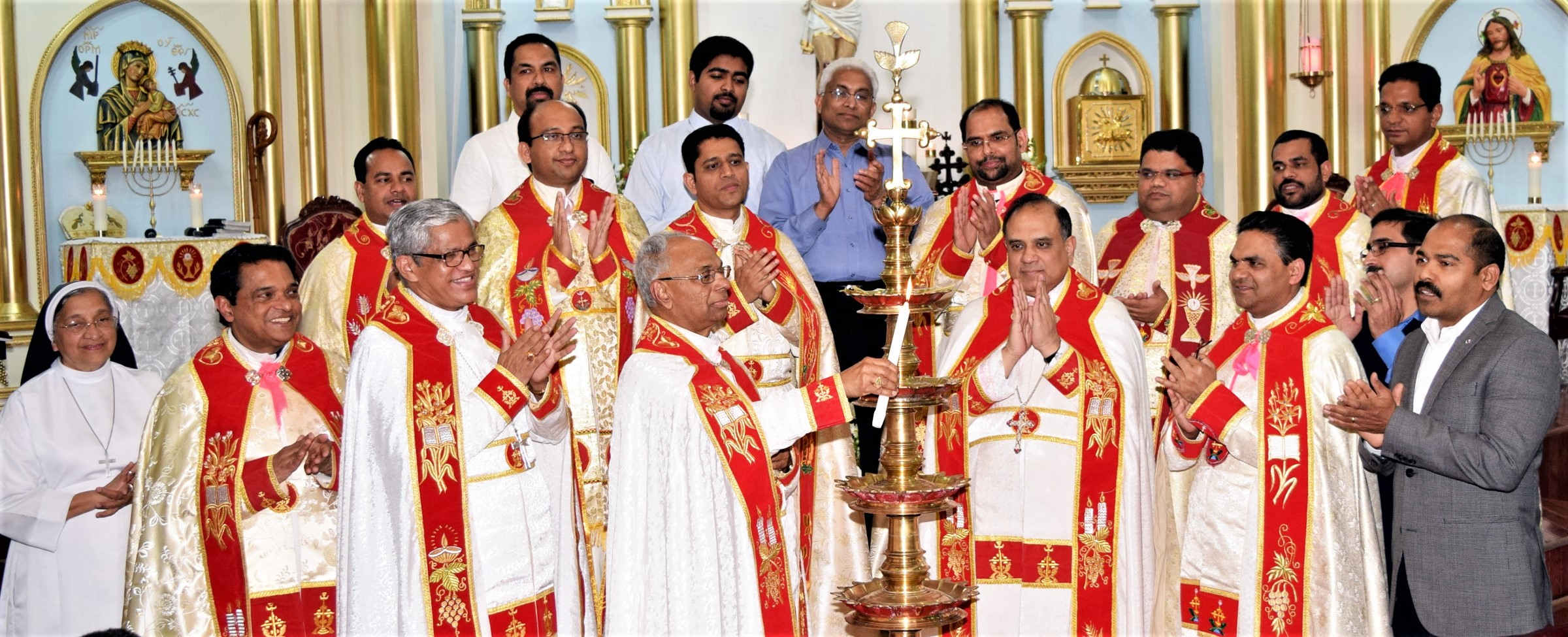
SHKC Forane inauguration by Bishop Mar Jacob Angadiath.

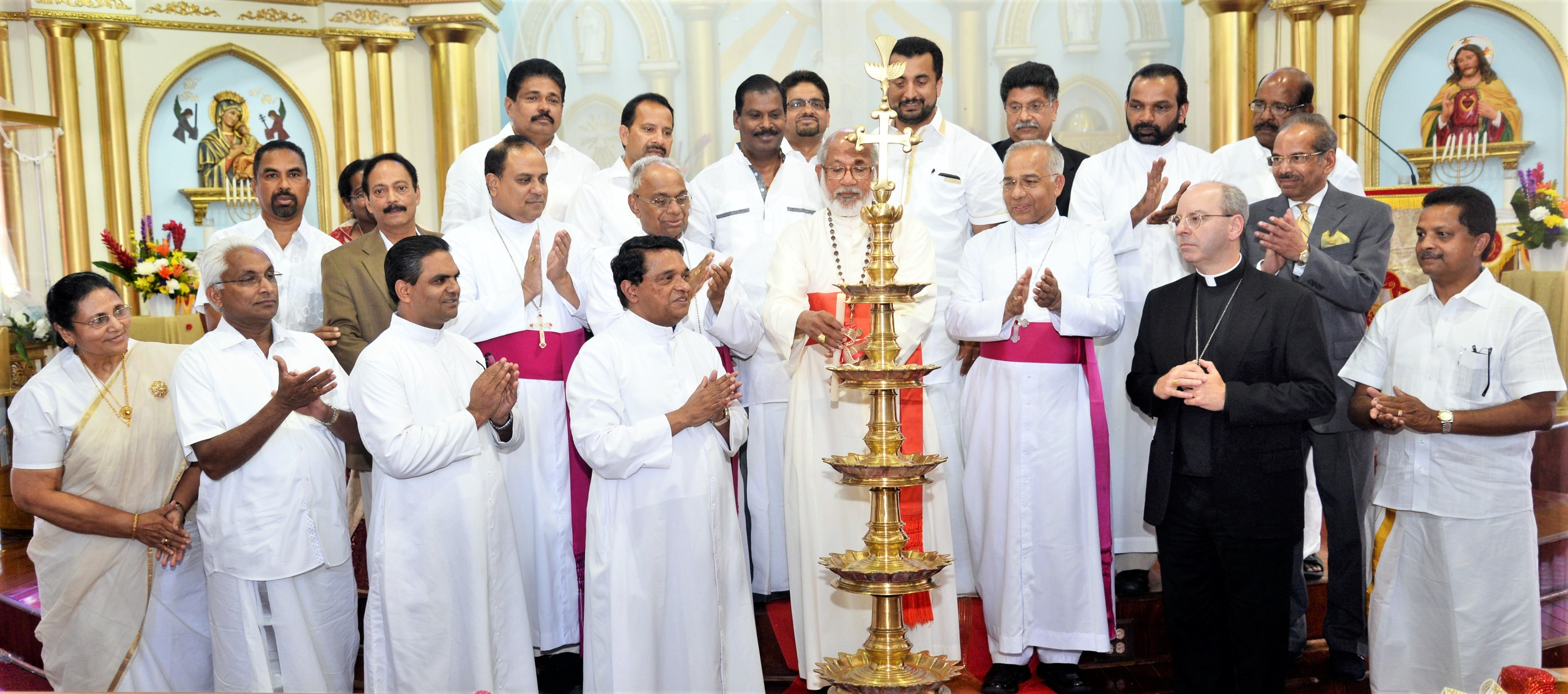
Tenth Anniversary Inauguration of the SHKC Parish by Cardinal Mar George Alancherry on 11 September 2006.

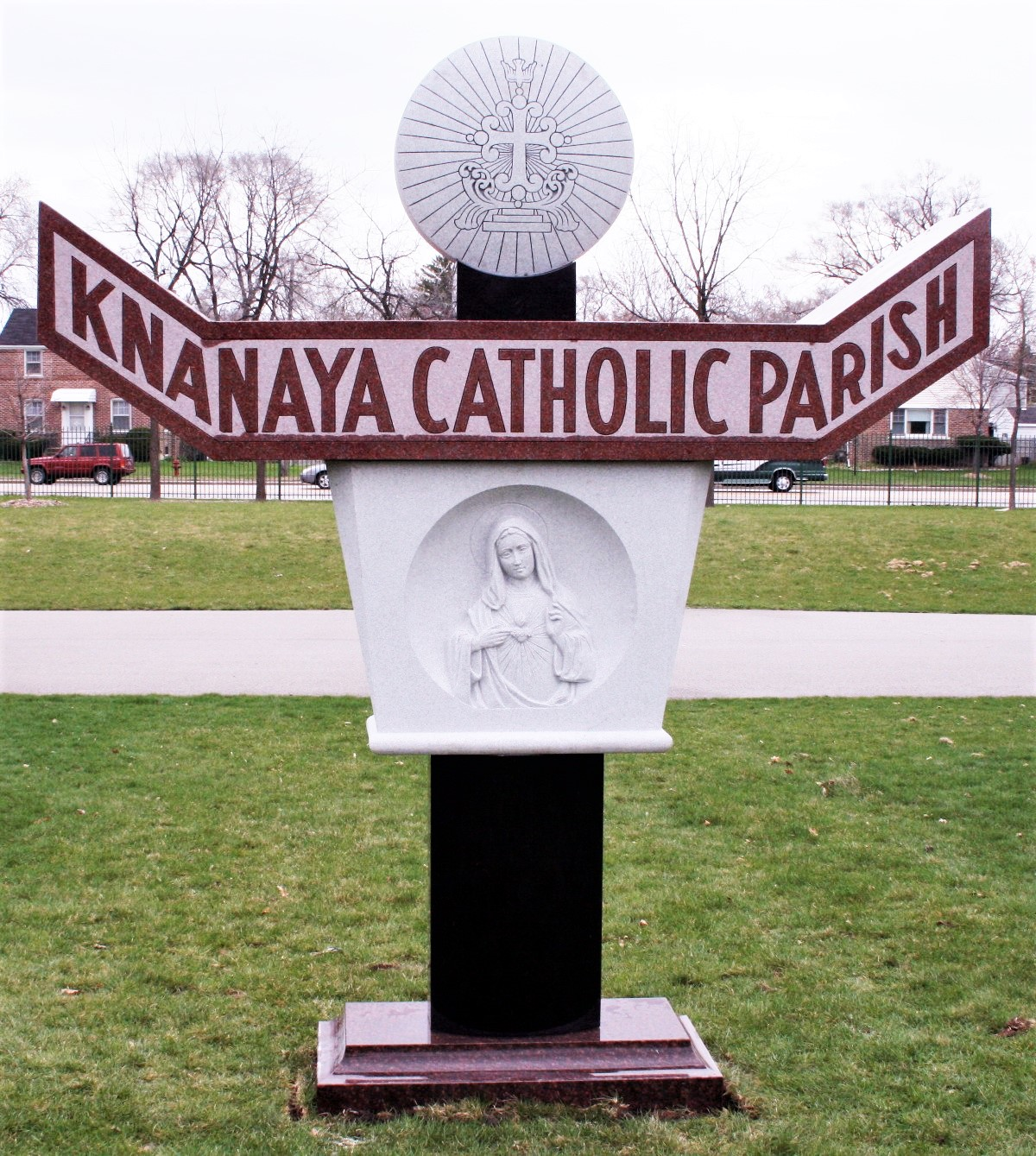
SHKC Parish Cemetery Shrine at Queen of Heaven Cemetery at Hillside, IL.

Sacred Heart Knanaya Catholic Church located in Maywood, Illinois in the United States is the first Knanaya Catholic Church established outside the juridical boundary of the Syro-Malabar Catholic Archeparchy of Kottayam. This church is also the first church of the Knanaya Region under the St. Thomas Syro-Malabar Catholic Diocese of Chicago. The migrants from the Archdiocese of Kottayam living in Illinois, Indiana, and Wisconsin were members of this parish at the time of its establishment on 24 September 2006. The parishioners were formerly members of the Knanaya Catholic Mission established by the Archdiocese of Chicago since 28 October 1983. Later another church was established in Morton Grove on 18 July 2010 for the parishioners living in the north side of 90 Expressway. The church was elevated as a forane church by Bishop Mar Jacob Angadiath on 22 March 2015. The parish servers around 400 Knanaya Catholic families.

== History ==
=== Under Latin Diocese ===
Knanaya Catholics had migrated from Kerala, India in the 1950s and 60s seeking educational and job opportunities. They were originally from the Syro-Malabar Catholic Archeparchy of Kottayam. They were organized in the 1980s as Knanaya Catholic Association. In January 1981, they sought the help of the then bishop of Kottayam, Mar Kuriakose Kunnacherry to send Knanaya Catholic priests to Chicago to serve their pastoral needs in the Syro-Malabar rite.

Since the Bishop of Kottayam has no ecclesiastical jurisdiction in the United States, he encouraged the association to contact the Archbishop of Chicago, to start Knanaya Missions under the Latin diocese and served by a priest sent from the Diocese of Kottayam. In the meantime, the Knanaya Catholic association used to arrange Syro-Malabar Holy Mass on alternate Saturday evenings whenever a priest was available.

The Archbishop of Chicago appointed Fr. Jacob Chollampel who came from the Diocese of Kottayam to serve the pastoral needs of the Syro-Malabar faithful in Chicago with effect from 28 October 1983. He was living in the rectory of St. Ita church. His successor Fr. Cyriac Manthuruthil took charge of the Knanaya Catholic mission on 31 May 1988. He was residing as St. Ferdinand's Church in Chicago. The Archbishop of Chicago appointed Fr. Simon Edathiparambil as the director of Knanaya Catholic Mission on 16 August 1995. His residence was at Immaculate Heart of Mary Parish in Chicago. Fr. Philip Thodukayil replaced Fr. Simon on 25 June 1999. His residence was at Immaculate Heart of Mary Parish.

Pope John Paul II established the St. Thomas Syro-Malabar Catholic Diocese of Chicago on 13 March 2001. It was inaugurated on 1 July 2001 for all the Syro-Malabar faithful in the United States. He appointed Mar Jacob Angadiath as its first bishop. The Knanaya Catholic Mission then came under the new diocese.

=== Under Syro-Malabar Diocese ===
Bishop Mar Jacob Angadiath recognized Knanaya Catholic Mission of Chicago as part of his diocese. He appointed Fr. Abraham Mutholath, Vicar General in charge of the Knanaya Community in the diocese as the director of the mission on 1 July 2004. The mission started expanding its activities by enhancing religious education school and Holy Mass in Chicago and North Lake, publishing Sunday bulletins, celebrating solemn feasts, organizing ministries and pious associations for various age groups, starting ward prayer meetings (Koodarayogams), and offering Theology courses for the mission members.

With the request of Bishop Mar Mathew Moolakkatt on 22 May 2005, attempts were made to purchase a church for the mission. A search committee was formed with the following members: Idiyalil Mathew, Kanjirathumkal Raju, Karikkal Baby, Kizhakkekuttu Biju, Knaiyaly Jose, Kulangara Jaibu, Manjankal James, Mutholam Sunny, Nediyakalayil Joy, Nedumchira Roy, Nellamattam Kurian, Njaravelil Jose, Pinarkayil Jose, and Poothura Binu.

Bishop Mar Jacob Angadiath established Knanaya Catholic Region on 28 April 2006. He inaugurated the region at OLV Church on 30 April 2006 and appointed Vicar General Rev. Fr. Abraham Mutholath as Region Director.

=== Parish Formation ===
The Knanaya Catholic Mission of Chicago bought St. James Church in Maywood from the Archdiocese of Chicago and started offering Holy Mass on 1 September 2006. Fr. Abraham Mutholath, along with parish council members inaugurated the church on 3 September 2006. Mar Jacob Angadiath elevated the mission as Sacred Heart Knanaya Catholic Parish and appointed Fr. Abraham Mutholath as the first pastor on 24 September 2006. St. Mary's parish unit with Sunday Mass at OLV Church was established for the parishioners in the northern area on 1 January 2007. The Sacred Heart Knanaya Catholic Parish bought a rectory from the Archdiocese of Chicago on 21 May 2007.

=== Parish Cemetery ===
The parishioners wished to have a separate section for the parish in the Queen of Heaven Cemetery, Hillside. Archdiocese of Chicago granted that wish and the parish got a section that was dedicated on 1 June 2007. Bishops Mar Jacob Angadiath, Bishop of Miao Mar George Pallipparambil, and Most Rev. Dr. Thomas Paprocki, Auxiliary Bishop of the Archdiocese of Chicago were the celebrants on the occasion. A shrine was erected at the cemetery. Bishop Mar Joseph Pandarasseril blessed the shrine on 13 July 2008.

=== Second Church ===
St. Mary's Unit of the parish bought a Jewish Synagogue at 7800 W. Lyons St., Morton Grove, IL 60053 for St. Mary's Knanaya Catholic Church on 14 January 2010. The consecration of the remodeled St. Mary's Church in Morton Grove was held on 18 July 2010. Bishop Mar Jacob Angadiath, Mar Mathew Moolakkatt, Archbishop of Kottayam and Mar Joseph Pandarasseril, the Auxiliary Bishop of Kottayam were the celebrants. Fr. Abraham Mutholath was appointed as its first pastor besides being the pastor of the Sacred Heart Church. A Visitation convent was started and the house was blessed by the bishops after the church consecration.

=== Forane Church ===
Fr. Saji Pinarkayil, the then associate pastor was appointed as the pastor from 1 January 2012. He introduced many spiritual activities in the parish. Archbishop Mar Mathew Moolakkatt blessed Shrine of the Most Sacred Heart of Jesus at Sacred Heart Church 17 September 2012. The parish bought a rectory at Elmhurst on 9 October 2012. Mar Mathew Moolakkatt blessed it on 27 November 2012.

Abraham Mutholath took charge again as pastor of the Sacred Heart Church on 18 October 2014. Bishop Mar Jacob Angadiath elevated the parish as a Forane in the presence of Bishop Mar Joy Alappatt and Bishop Mar Lawrence Mukkuzhy on 22 March 2015. Fr. Abraham Mutholath was appointed as forane vicar.

=== Tenth Anniversary ===
Archbishop Mar Mathew Moolakkatt inaugurated a three-day 10th anniversary celebration of the parish on 9 September 2016. The final day celebration was on 11 September 2016. Syro-Malabar Major Archbishop Mar George Cardinal Alancherry inaugurated the final day celebrations. Other dignitaries were: Archbishop Mar Mathew Moolakkatt, Bishop Mar Jacob Angadiath, Bishop Mar Joy Alappatt, and Bishop Most Rev. Dr. Michael Mulhall (Canada). Priests from the Knanaya Region and other invited priests were also concelebrants.

== Pastoral Programs ==
The parish is active with various pastoral programs with the support of many volunteers. It has a parish council with representatives from various wards, from different ministries, pious associations and other departments. The parish has supported individuals, parishes and mission dioceses for pastoral and charitable programs. Agape Movement also functions for charitable services in the parish.

=== Devotional ===
- Adoration
- Bible Classes
- Feasts
- Holy Mass in Malayalam and English
- Prayer Meetings

=== Ministries ===
- Children / Teens Ministry
- Youth Ministry
- Men Ministry
- Women Ministry
- Family Ministry
- Senior Ministry

=== Pious Associations ===
- Cherupushpa Mission League
- Legion of Mary
- St. Vincent de Paul
- Prayer Group

=== Other Services ===
- Agape Movement
- Altar servers: Junior and senior teams
- Choir: Children / Youth and Adult
- Christmas Carol during December
- Darsana Samooham for feasts
- Eucharistic Ministers
- Koodara-yogams (Ward Meetings)
- Pilgrimages
- Religious Education School
- Sunday Bulletin

== Chronology ==
- 2004 July 1: Mar Jacob Angadiath appointed Fr. Abraham Mutholath, the vicar general, also as the director of the mission.
- 2004 August 8: The mission celebrated its first solemn feast in honor of St. Pope Pius X at IHM Church.
- 2004 September 4: The mission started Holy Mass at St. Peter's Church in North Lake on every Saturday at 5:00 P.M.
- 2006 September 1: Bought St. James Church in Maywood from the Archdiocese of Chicago for Knanaya Catholic Mission and started offering Holy Mass there.
- 2006 September 3: Fr. Abraham Mutholath, along with parish council members inaugurated the church brought for the Knanaya Catholic Mission.
- 2006 September 24: Mar Jacob Angadiath elevated the Knanaya Catholic Mission to the status of a parish and appointed Fr. Abraham Mutholath as the first pastor.
- 2007 January 1: Fr. Abraham Mutholath started St. Mary's Knanaya Catholic Parish Unit with holy mass on Sunday evenings at OLV Church in Chicago.
- 2007 May 31: Purchased Rectory from the Archdiocese of Chicago.
- 2007 June 1: Dedication of Knanaya Catholic Parish Cemetery at Queen of Heaven Cemetery by Bishops Mar Jacob Angadiath, Bishop of Miao Mar George Pallipparambil, and Most Rev. Dr. Thomas Paprocki, Auxiliary Bishop of the Archdiocese of Chicago.
- 2008 July 13: Bishop Mar Joseph Pandarasseril blessed the shrine of the Knanaya Catholic Parish Cemetery.
- 2008 August 3: Silver Jubilee Celebration of Knanaya Catholic Mission at the Sacred Heart Church. Mar Mathew Moolakkatt, Mar Jacob Angadiath, and Mar George Pallipparambil were the dignitaries present.
- 2008 October 26: Blessing of renovated sanctuary at Sacred Heart Church by Bishop Mar Mathew Moolakkatt and Bishop Mar Jacob Angadiath.
- 2012 September 17: Archbishop Mar Mathew Moolakkatt blessed Shrine of the Most Sacred Heart of Jesus at Sacred Heart Church.
- 2012 October 9: The parish bought a rectory at Elmhurst. Mar Mathew Moolakkatt blessed it on 27 November 2012.
- 2014 October 18: Fr. Abraham Mutholath took charge again as pastor of the Sacred Heart Church.
- 2015 March 22: Bishop Mar Jacob Angadiath elevated the parish as a Forane in the presence of Bishop Mar Joy Alappatt and Bishop Mar Lawrence Mukkuzhy. Fr. Abraham Mutholath was appointed as forane vicar.
- 2016 September 9: Archbishop Mar Mathew Moolakkatt inaugurated the 10th anniversary celebration of the parish.

== See also ==
- St. Thomas Diocese of Chicago
- Syro-Malabar Catholic Archeparchy of Kottayam
- Knanaya Region
- St. Mary's Knanaya Catholic Parish, Chicago
- St. Pius X Knanaya Catholic Parish, Los Angeles

== Bibliography ==
- Thoudkayil, Fr. Philip J., "Knanaya Catholic Mission, Chicago," Commemorative Souvenir 2001, Syro-Malabar Catholic Convention, Inauguration of St. Thomas Diocese of Chicago, Episcopal Ordination of Mar Jacob Angadiath, Editor in Chief: George Joseph Kottukappally. Chicago:2001. Print.
- Diocesan Bulletin, The Official Bulletin of St. Thomas Syro-Malabar Catholic Diocese of Chicago, Chicago: October 2001. Print.
- Karakkatt, Bijo (Executive Editor), Tenth Anniversary Souvenir of Chicago Sacred Heart Knanaya Catholic Forane Parish, 2016. Web.
- Mathrusmruthi (മാതൃസ്മൃതി), Church establishment Souvenir, St. Mary's Knanaya Catholic Parish, Chicago: 2010. Print.
- Mutholath, Abraham. (2014). Preservation of the Ecclesial Nature of Knanaya Community in North America. Jacob Kollaparambil and Baiju Mukalel, (Eds.). Kottayam: Centenary Symposiums. Kottayam:2014 pp. 497–505. Print.
- Mutholath, Fr. Abraham & George Thottappuram, "വടക്കേ അമേരിക്കയിലെ ക്നാനായ റീജിയന്റെ ഉത്ഭവവും വളർച്ചയും," (The Origin and Growth of the Knanaya Region in North America") Silver Jubilee Souvenir, Kottayam: Missionary Society of St. Pius X, 2009, pp. 51–56. Print.
- Silver Jubilee Souvenir - 2008, Chicago: Sacred Heart Knanaya Catholic Parish. Print.
- Karakkatt, Sunday Bulletins of Sacred Heart Knanaya Catholic Parish of Chicago. Web.
