= Knanaya Region =

Knanaya Catholic Region of St. Thomas Syro-Malabar Catholic Diocese of Chicago
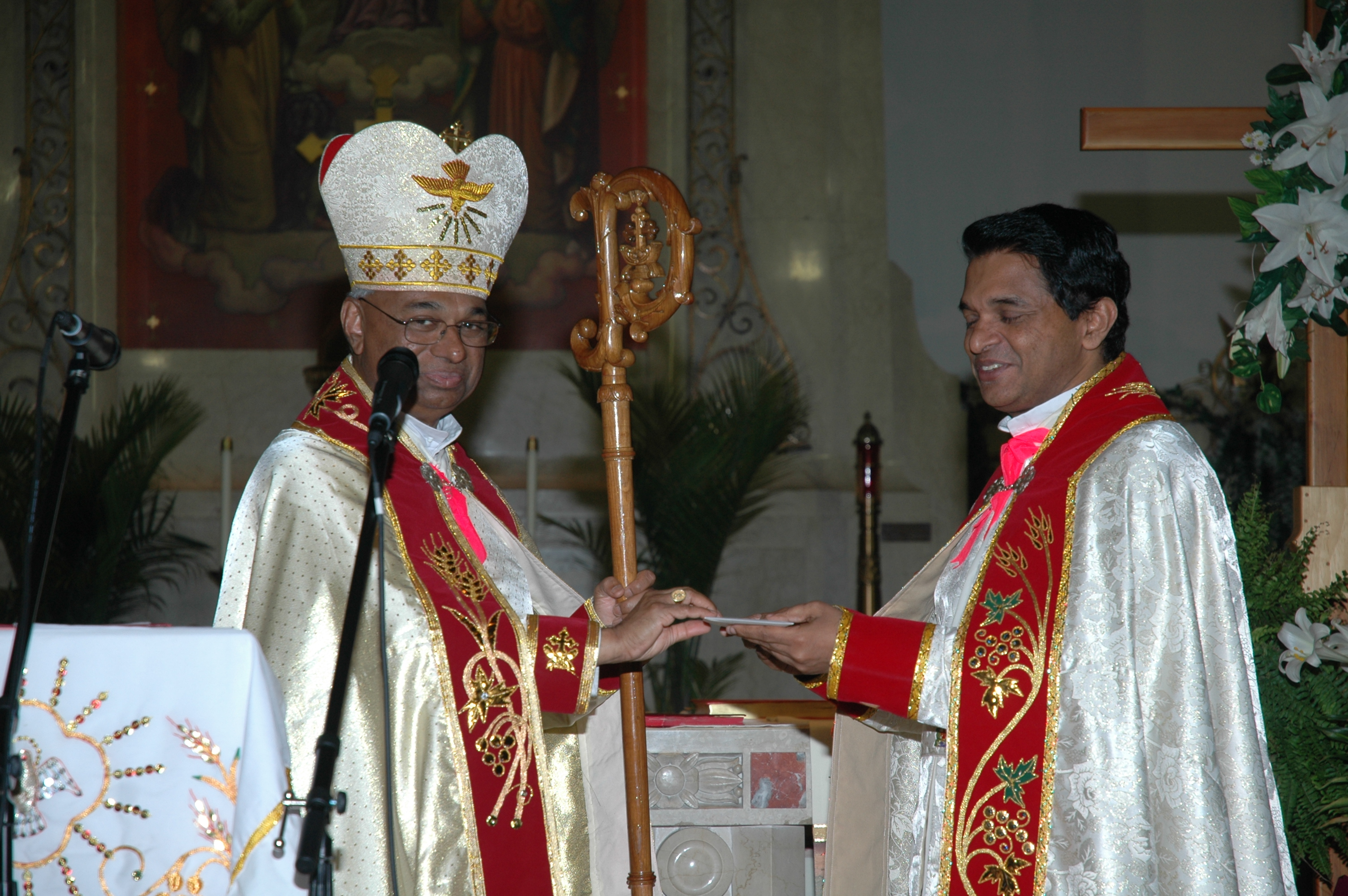
- Bishop Mar Jacob Angadiath handing over to the first Knanaya Region director Fr. Abraham Mutholath the decree establishing the Knanaya Region

Location
- Country: USA
- Territory: United States
- Ecclesiastical province: Knanaya Catholic Region

Statistics
- Parishes: 7 missions
- Churches: 15
- Congregations: 4 convents

Information
- Denomination: Eastern Catholic
- Rite: Syro-Malabar
- Established: 28 April 2006
- Secular priests: 19

Current leadership
- Pope: Leo XIV
- Major Archbishop: Mar Raphael Thattil
- Bishop: Mar Joy Alappatt
- Vicar General: Fr. Thomas Mulavanal
- Bishops emeritus: Mar Jacob Angadiath

Website
- www.knanayaregion.us www.knanayaregion.org

Knanaya Region is a subdivision of the St. Thomas Syro-Malabar Catholic Diocese of Chicago. This region was officially established by Mar Jacob Angadiath, the bishop of the diocese on 30 April 2006. On that day, the bishop appointed Fr. Abraham Mutholath, the then Vicar General for Knanaya Community, as the first director of the Knanaya Region. The purpose of this region is to coordinate all the pastoral activities of the diocese under the leadership of Knanaya Region director who is also one of the Vicar Generals of the diocese.

According to the decree of the Bishop, all Knanaya Catholic parishes, Knanaya missions, and all the Knanaya Catholic faithful who live in the USA outside the proper territory of an established Knanaya Catholic parish or mission will come under this region. This is a personal jurisdiction style followed in the Syro-Malabar Church in India where the Archbishop of Kottayam has personal jurisdiction over all the Knanaya Catholics within the juridical boundary of the Syro-Malabar Church.

The Knanaya Catholic Region has five forane parishes, 15 parishes, seven missions, and four convents.

== History ==
Knanaya Catholics from the Archdiocese of Kottayam, Kerala began to migrate to the United States in the 1950s. They came mainly for education and later for job opportunities. However, they eventually settled in this country and brought their family also to the United States. When they came to this foreign land, they missed their Syro-Malabar Malayalam Qurbana and wanted to arrange it for prayer followed by a social gathering. They arranged such Holy Mass whenever they could get a Syro-Malabar priest who came either for studies or for work in American parishes.

The Knanaya Catholics in Chicago organized and appealed to the Bishop of Kottayam Mar Kuriakose Kunnacherry on 17 January 1981 to send a priest to meet their pastoral needs in the Syro-Malabar Rite. Since the Bishop of Kottayam has no ecclesiastical jurisdiction outside the proper territory of the Syro-Malabar Church in Kerala, he wrote a letter to Cardinal John Cody, the Archbishop of Chicago, on 18 March 1981, seeking his help to establish a special ministry for Knanaya Catholics in Chicago. Because of some confusion the cardinal postponed his decision.

When Joseph Bernardin became the new Archbishop of Chicago, Bishop Mar Kuriakose Kunnacherry wrote to him asking to reconsider the former request to start a special ministry for Knanaya Catholics in Chicago. At the direction of the Archbishop of Chicago, his chancellor convened a meeting of the Knanaya Associations on 27 September 1983, and decided to start the proposed ministry. Bishop Mar Kuriakose Kunnacherry sent Fr. Jacob Chollampel from the diocese of Kottayam in October 1983 to serve the newly constituted ministry.

Following the example of Knanaya Catholics in Chicago, the Knanaya Catholic migrants in the other cities of the United States also applied to their local Latin bishops to start Knanaya Catholic missions for them. Bishop Kunnacherry also recommended for the same and sent priests from the Diocese of Kottayam to serve the Knanaya Catholic Missions established by the Latin bishops. Thus the Latin Catholic dioceses in the United States established nine Knanaya Catholic missions before the establishment of the St. Thomas Syro-Malabar Catholic Diocese of Chicago in 2001. They are Chicago (1983), Brooklyn, NY (1993), Westchester and Bronx, NY (1993), Houston (1994), Dallas (1996), Newark, New Jersey (1996), Rockland, NY (1996), Philadelphia (1999), and San Jose (2000).

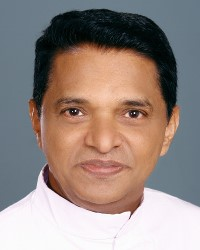
First Vicar General and Region Director of Knanaya Region from 2001 to 2014.

When Pope John Paul II established the St. Thomas Syro-Malabar Catholic Diocese of Chicago in 2001, all the Knanaya Catholic faithful in the United States who had become part of the local Latin parishes and the nine Knanaya Catholic Missions under the Latin bishops came under the pastoral jurisdiction of this diocese. Considering the desire of the community and to help him with the pastoral administration of the Knanaya Catholic faithful in the diocese, Bishop Mar Jacob Angadiath appointed Rev. Fr. Abraham Mutholath on 3 October 2001 as one of the two Vicar Generals (Syncellus) of the diocese with special charge of the Knanaya Catholics. Bishop Mar Jacob Angadiath officially accepted all the Knanaya Catholic missions in the United States on 29 October 2003 as part of his diocese and asked the mission directors to continue their service in their respective missions.

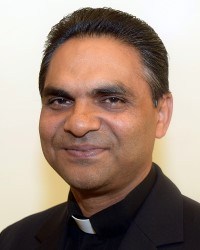
Vicar General and Knanaya Region Director from 2014.

First Vicar General Fr. Abraham Mutholath motivated the Knanaya Catholic faithful in the different parts of the United States to start Knanaya Missions wherever possible and to buy churches to grow as parishes. The first church was brought in the City of Maywood in Chicago in 2006. Later more churches and missions were added.

Since the St. Thomas Syro-Malabar Diocese of Chicago is spread all over the United States, Bishop Mar Jacob Angadiath established seven regions in his diocese on 28 April 2006. One of these regions is for all Knanaya Catholics in the diocese. According to the decree issued by the bishop, "The formal Knanaya Catholic missions and the faithful of the Knanaya community living in other places where no formal missions are established will make one region". Vicar General Fr. Abraham Mutholath is appointed as the director of this region. The official declaration of this region was held at OLV Church Chicago on 30 April 2006, by Bishop Mar Jacob Angadiath.

Bishop Mar Jacob Angadiath appointed Fr. Thomas Mulavanal as the Vicar General and director of the Knanaya Catholic Region on 8 February 2014.

== Knanaya forane parishes in the United States ==
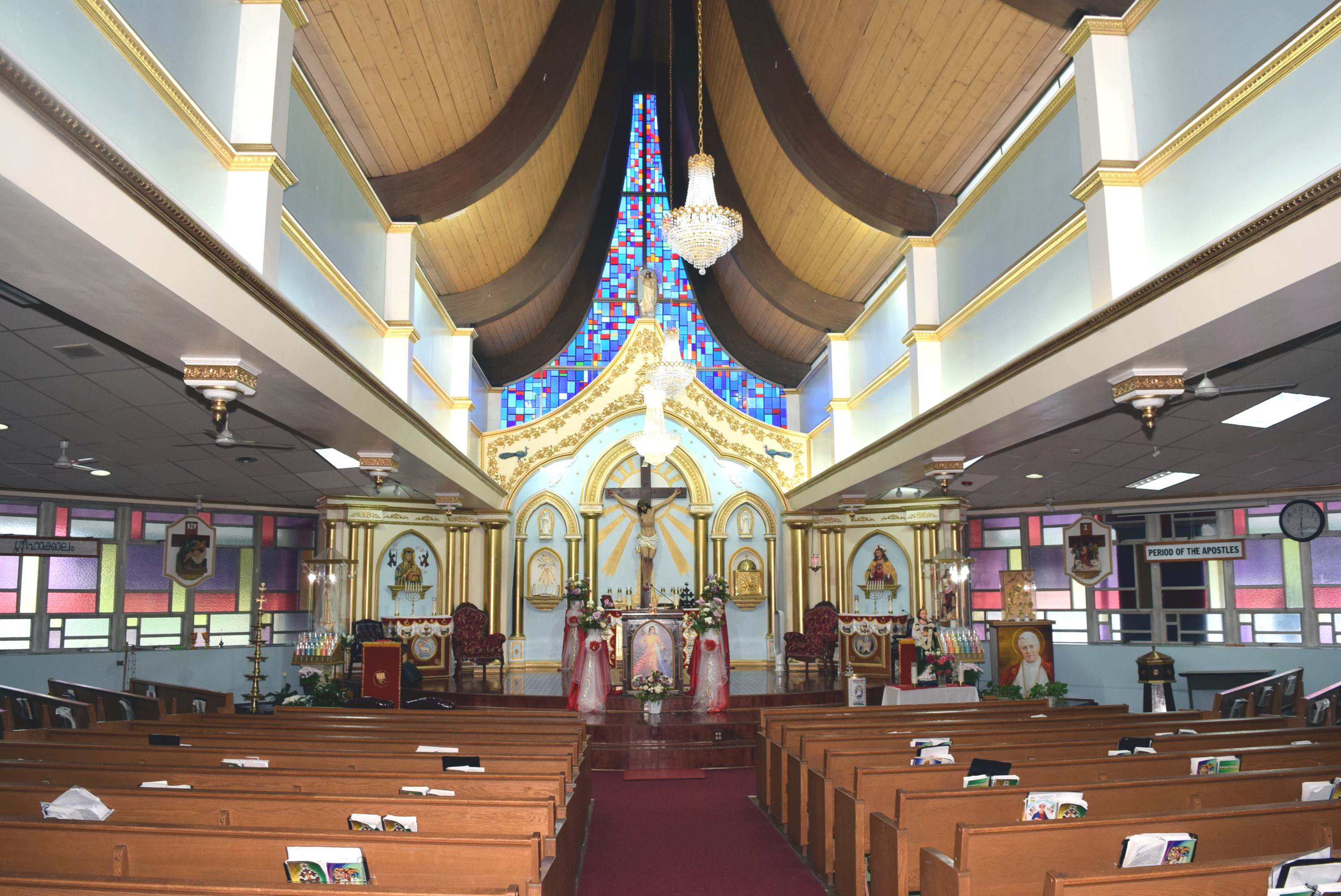
Sanctuary of Sacred Heart Knanaya Catholic Forane Parish, Chicago, the first Knanaya Catholic Parish outside Kerala.

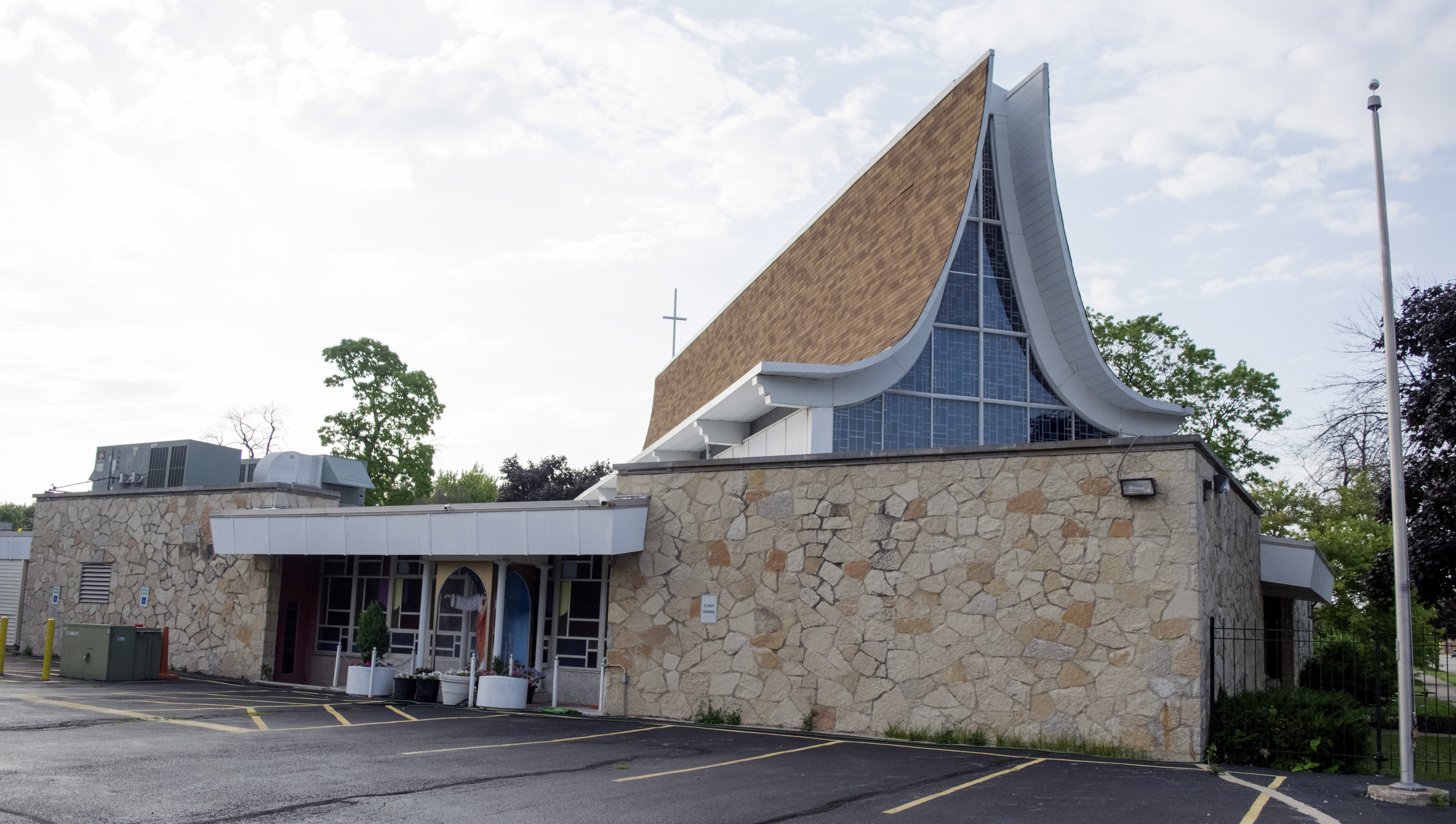
Exterior view of Chicago Sacred Heart Knanaya Catholic Church, the first church of the Knanaya Catholics in the diaspora.

Mar Jacob Angadiath raised the following parishes of the Knanaya Region of the diocese into forane status on 28 February 2015:

- Sacred Heart Knanaya Catholic Church, Chicago, IL
- St. Mary's Knanaya Catholic Church Houston, TX
- Sacred Heart Knanaya Catholic Church Tampa, FL
- St. Stephen Knanaya Catholic Church Hempstead, NY
- St. Mary's Knanaya Catholic Church San Jose, CA

=== Chicago Knanaya Forane ===
The parishes and missions that come under Chicago Knanaya Catholic Forane are the following:

- Chicago Sacred Heart Knanaya Catholic Forane Parish
- Chicago St. Mary's Knanaya Catholic Parish
- Detroit St. Mary's Knanaya Catholic Parish
- Minnesota, St. Paul Knanaya Catholic Mission

=== Houston Knanaya Forane ===
The parishes and missions that come under Houston Knanaya Catholic Forane are the following:

- Houston St. Mary's Knanaya Catholic Forane Parish
- Dallas Christ the King Knanaya Catholic Parish
- San Antonio St. Anthony's Knanaya Catholic Parish

=== Tampa Knanaya Forane ===
The parishes and missions that come under Tampa Knanaya Catholic Forane are the following:

- Tampa Sacred Heart Knanaya Catholic Forane Parish
- Atlanta Holy Family Knanaya Catholic Parish
- Miami (South Florida) St. Jude Knanaya Catholic Parish
- Orlando St. Stephen's Knanaya Catholic Parish

=== New York Knanaya Forane ===
The parishes and missions that come under New York Knanaya Catholic Forane are the following:

- New York St. Stephen Knanaya Catholic Forane Parish
- New Jersey Christ the King Knanaya Catholic Parish, Carteret
- Rockland, New York St. Mary's Knanaya Catholic Parish
- Connecticut, New York Holy Family Knanaya Catholic Mission
- Westchester-Bronx, New York Knanaya Catholic Mission
- Philadelphia St. John Neumann Knanaya Catholic Mission

=== San Jose Knanaya Forane ===
The parishes and missions that come under San Jose Knanaya Catholic Forane are the following:

- San Jose St. Mary's Knanaya Catholic Forane Parish
- Los Angeles Pope St. Pius X Knanaya Catholic Parish
- Las Vegas, NV St. Stephen's Knanaya Catholic Mission
- Sacramento, CA St. John Paul II Knanaya Catholic Mission
- Tracy (Stockton), CA St. Joseph’s Knanaya Catholic Mission

== Chronology ==
- 1981 January: Knanaya Catholics in Chicago started attempts to get a Knanaya Catholic priest from the Knanaya Catholic Diocese of Kottayam.
- 1983 October 28: Fr. Jacob Chollampel came from Kottayam and started his ministry.
- 2000 July 1: Establishment of Knanaya Catholic Mission of San Jose with Fr. Dominic Madathilkalathil as its director.
- 2001 July 1: Inauguration of the St. Thomas Syro-Malabar Catholic Diocese of Chicago and consecration of its bishop Mar Jacob Angadiath at Hyatt Hotel in Chicago.
- 2001 October 3: Mar Jacob Angadiath appointed Fr. Abraham Mutholath as Syncellus (Vicar General) with responsibility over the Knanaya Catholics in the eparchy.
- 2002 March 17: Mar Jacob Angadiath established St. Pius X Knanaya Catholic Mission in Los Angeles with Fr. Abraham Mutholath as the director.
- 2003 October 29: Mar Jacob Angadiath officially recognized 10 Knanaya Catholic Mission Missions in the US, as missions of the St. Thomas Diocese of Chicago.
- 2006 April 28: Mar Jacob Angadiath established seven regions in St. Thomas Syro-Malabar Diocese of Chicago. One of these regions is for all Knanaya Catholics in the diocese.
- 2006 April 30: Mar Jacob Angadiath officially declared the establishment of Knanaya Catholic Region at OLV Church Chicago and appointed Vicar General Fr. Abraham Mutholath as the Region Director.
- 2006 September 3: Inauguration of the first Diaspora Knanaya Catholic Parish in the name of Sacred Heart Knanaya Catholic Church, Chicago by Vicar General Rev. Fr. Abraham Mutholath.
- 2006 September 24: Mar Jacob Angadiath established the first Diaspora Knanaya Catholic Parish in Chicago by elevating the Knanaya Catholic Mission as a parish and appointing Fr. Abraham Mutholath as the pastor.
- 2007 January 1: Formation of St. Mary's Knanaya Catholic Parish Unit in Chicago.
- 2007 June 1: Dedication of the first Diaspora Knanaya Catholic Parish Cemetery in Chicago.
- 2007 July 21: Mar Jacob Angadiath established Knanaya Catholic Mission, Miami in South Florida, and appointed Fr. George Pakkuvettithara as its director in charge.
- 2008 August 15: Mar Jacob Angadiath established Knanaya Catholic Mission in Atlanta with Fr. Stany Edathiparambil as its director.
- 2008 September 20: Vicar General Fr. Abraham Mutholath inaugurated the Knanaya Catholic Mission on Atlanta, Georgia.
- 2009 January 3: Establishment of Knanaya Catholic Missions in Detroit and Las Vegas by Mar Jacob Angadiath. Vicar General Fr. Abraham Mutholath was the mission director in Detroit and Fr. Thomas Mulavanal was the mission director in Las Vegas in addition to their other responsibilities.
- 2009 January 25: Mar Jacob Angadiath established Knanaya Catholic Mission in Tampa with Vicar General Fr. Abraham Mutholath as the director.
- 2009 February 21: Inauguration of the Knanaya Catholic Mission in Las Vegas by Mar Mathew Moolakkatt.
- 2009 April 4: Mar Jacob Angadiath consecrated Holy Family Knanaya Catholic Church in Atlanta and elevated it as the second parish of the Knanaya Region with Fr. Stany Edathiparambil as the pastor.
- 2009 April 18: The first feast and inauguration of Knanaya Catholic Mission of Detroit by Bishop Mar Jacob Angadiath.
- 2009 May 16: Inauguration of the Knanaya Catholic Mission of San Antonio by Vicar General Fr. Abraham Mutholath. Fr. James Cheruvil was the director.
- 2009 October 18: Vicar general Fr. Abraham Mutholath inaugurated Knanaya Mission at Minnesota. Fr. Abraham Mutholath is the official mission director and Fr. Biju Pattasseril is in charge of the mission.
- 2009 October 23: Vicar General Fr. Abraham Mutholath inaugurated the Knanaya Catholic Mission in Connecticut. Fr. James Ponganayil is the mission director.
- 2010 July 17: Church Consecration and elevation of mission as parish in Detroit by Mar Jacob Angadiath, Mar Mathew Moolakkatt, and Mar Joseph Pandarasseril. Fr. Mathew Meledath was the pastor.
- 2010 July 18: Consecration of St. Mary's Church in Morton Grove, Chicago, and elevation of it as parish with Fr. Abraham Mutholath as the pastor by Mar Jacob Angadiath, Mar Mathew Moolakkatt, and Mar Joseph Pandarasseril. This was followed by convent blessing in Morton Grove, Chicago.
- 2010 July 21: Consecration of St. Antony's Knanaya Catholic Church in San Antonio and elevation of it as a parish with Fr. James Cheruvil as the pastor by Mar Jacob Angadiath, Mar Mathew Moolakkatt, and Mar Joseph Pandarasseril.
- 2010 July 26: Consecration of Knanaya Catholic Church in Dallas and elevation of it as a parish with Fr. Jose Sauriamakil as the pastor by Mar Jacob Angadiath, Mar Mathew Moolakkatt, and Mar Joseph Pandarasseril.
- 2010 July 31: Consecration of Knanaya Catholic Church in Los Angeles and elevation of the mission as a parish with Fr. Thomas Mulavanal as pastor by Mar Jacob Angadiath, Mar Mathew Moolakkatt, and Mar Joseph Pandarasseril.
- 2010 August 1: Consecration of the Knanaya Catholic Church in Tampa and elevation of the mission as a parish with Fr. Bins Chethalil as the pastor by Mar Jacob Angadiath, Mar Mathew Moolakkatt, and Mar Joseph Pandarasseril.
- 2011 November 5: Consecration of the Knanaya Catholic Church in Houston and elevation of the mission as parish by Mar Jacob Angadiath, Mar Mathew Moolakkatt, and Mar Joseph Pandarasseril.
- 2011 November 12: Inauguration of Blessed Pope John Paul II Knanaya Catholic Mission, Sacramento with Fr. Stany Edathiparambil as the director by Vicar General Fr. Abraham Mutholath.
- 2014 February 8: Mar Jacob Angadiath appointed Fr. Thomas Mulavanal as the Vicar General and director of the Knanaya Catholic Region.
- 2014 September 27: Episcopal Ordination of Mar Joy Alappatt at Mar Thoma Sleeha Cathedral.
- 2015 February 28: Mar Jacob Angadiath elevated five Churches of the Knanaya Region to the status of Forane Parishes: Sacred Heart Church Chicago IL, Sacred Heart Church Tampa FL, St. Mary's Church Houston TX, St. Stephen's Church New York, and St. Mary's Church San Jose CA.
- 2015 May 31: Consecration of the Knanaya Catholic Church in Miami and elevation of the mission as a parish with Fr. Jose Adoppallil as the pastor by Mar Jacob Angadiath, Mar Mathew Moolakkatt and Archbishop Thomas Wenskat.
- 2016 September 10: 10th anniversary celebration of Knanaya Catholic Region at St. Mary's Knanaya Catholic Parish, Chicago.
- 2016 November 10: Blessing of Visitation Convent in Tampa by Bishop Mar Jacob Angadiath.
- 2017 August 5: St. Joseph's Congregation sent three sisters to start a new convent in Houston, TX.
- 2017 September 23: Consecration of Knanaya Catholic Church in Rock Land, New York and elevated the mission as a parish with Fr. Jose Adoppallil as the pastor by Mar Jacob Angadiath and Mar Mathew Moolakkatt.
- May 25, 2018: Mar Jacob Angadiath established Knanaya Catholic Mission in Orlando with Fr. Mathew Meledath as the director. Mar Joy Alappatt inaugurated the mission.
- 2018 September 15: Consecration of Knanaya Catholic Church in Carteret and elevation of the mission as a parish with Fr. Renny Kattel as pastor by Mar Jacob Angadiath, Mar Mathew Moolakkat, and Mar Joy Alappatt
- 2022 October 1: Episcopal Installation of Mar Joy Alappatt as the Second Bishop of the Syro Malabar Eparchy of St Thomas of Chicago.

== See also ==
St. Thomas Diocese of Chicago

Syro-Malabar Catholic Archeparchy of Kottayam

Sacred Heart Knanaya Catholic Church, Chicago

St. Mary's Knanaya Catholic Church, Chicago

St. Pius X Knanaya Catholic Parish, Los Angeles

== Bibliography ==
- Commemorative Souvenir 2001, Syro-Malabar Catholic Convention, Inauguration of St. Thomas Diocese of Chicago, Episcopal Ordination of Mar Jacob Angadiath, Editor in Chief: George Joseph Kottukappally.
- Diocesan Bulletin, The Official Bulletin of St. Thomas Syro-Malabar Catholic Diocese of Chicago, October 2001.
- Karakkatt, Bijo (Executive Editor), Tenth Anniversary Souvenir of Chicago Sacred Heart Knanaya Catholic Forane Parish, 2016.
- Karukaparambil, Dr. George. (2005). Marganitha Kynanaitha (ക്നാനായ മുത്ത്) (English Book), Kottayam: Jyothi Book House.
- Mathrusmruthi (മാതൃസ്മൃതി), Church establishment Souvenir, St. Mary's Knanaya Catholic Parish, Chicago, 2010.
- Mutholath, Abraham. (2014). Preservation of the Ecclesial Nature of Knanaya Community in North America. Jacob Kollaparambil and Baiju Mukalel, (Eds.). Kottayam: Centenary Symposiums. pp. 497–505.
- Mutholath, Fr. Abraham & George Thottappuram, "വടക്കേ അമേരിക്കയിലെ ക്നാനായ റീജിയന്റെ ഉത്ഭവവും വളർച്ചയും," (The Origin and Growth of the Knanaya Region in North America") Silver Jubilee Souvenir, Missionary Society of St. Pius X, 2009, pp. 51–56.
- Silver Jubilee Souvenir - 2008, Sacred Heart Knanaya Catholic Parish, Chicago.
- Souvenir 2011, St. Pius X Knanaya Catholic Church, Los Angeles, January 2012.
- Karakkatt, Bijo (Executive Editor), Tenth Anniversary Souvenir of Chicago Sacred Heart Knanaya Catholic Forane Parish, 2016.
- Uralil, Baby (Ed.). (2001). The Future of Knanaya Community in America. (അമേരിക്കയിലെ ക്നാനായ സമൂഹത്തിന്റെ ഭാവി) (Malayalam Language). A collection of papers and speeches at the Millennium Conference held at New Jersey organized by KCCNA from 17–19 November 2000.
