= St. Mary's Knanaya Catholic Parish, Chicago =

SMKC Parish, Chicago
- St. Mary's Kananaya Catholic Church, Chicago
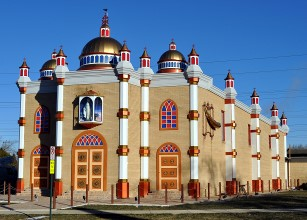
- Location: Morton Grove, Illinois
- Country: United States
- Denomination: Knanaya Catholic
- Tradition: Syro-Malabar Rite in Malayalam & English
- Website: www.smkcparish.us

History
- Former name: Knanaya Catholic Mission
- Status: Parish
- Founded: 18 July 2010
- Dedication: Blessed Virgin Mary
- Events: * 28 October 1983: Mission Started; * 1 January 2007: Parish Unit under Sacred Heart Knanaya Catholic Church Chicago; * 18 July 2010: Church Consecration & Elevation as Parish

Administration
- District: Knanaya Catholic Region
- Province: Sacred Heart Knanaya Catholic Forane Chicago
- Diocese: Syro-Malabar Catholic Diocese of Chicago

Clergy
- Bishop(s): Mar Jacob Angadiath and Auxiliary Bishop Mar Joy Alappatt
- Priest: Fr. Thomas Mulavanal

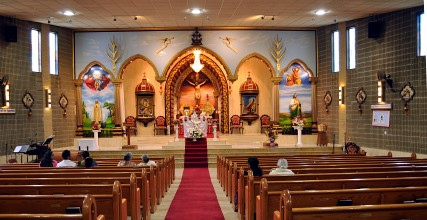
Sanctuary of St. Mary's Knanaya Catholic Parish, Chicago.

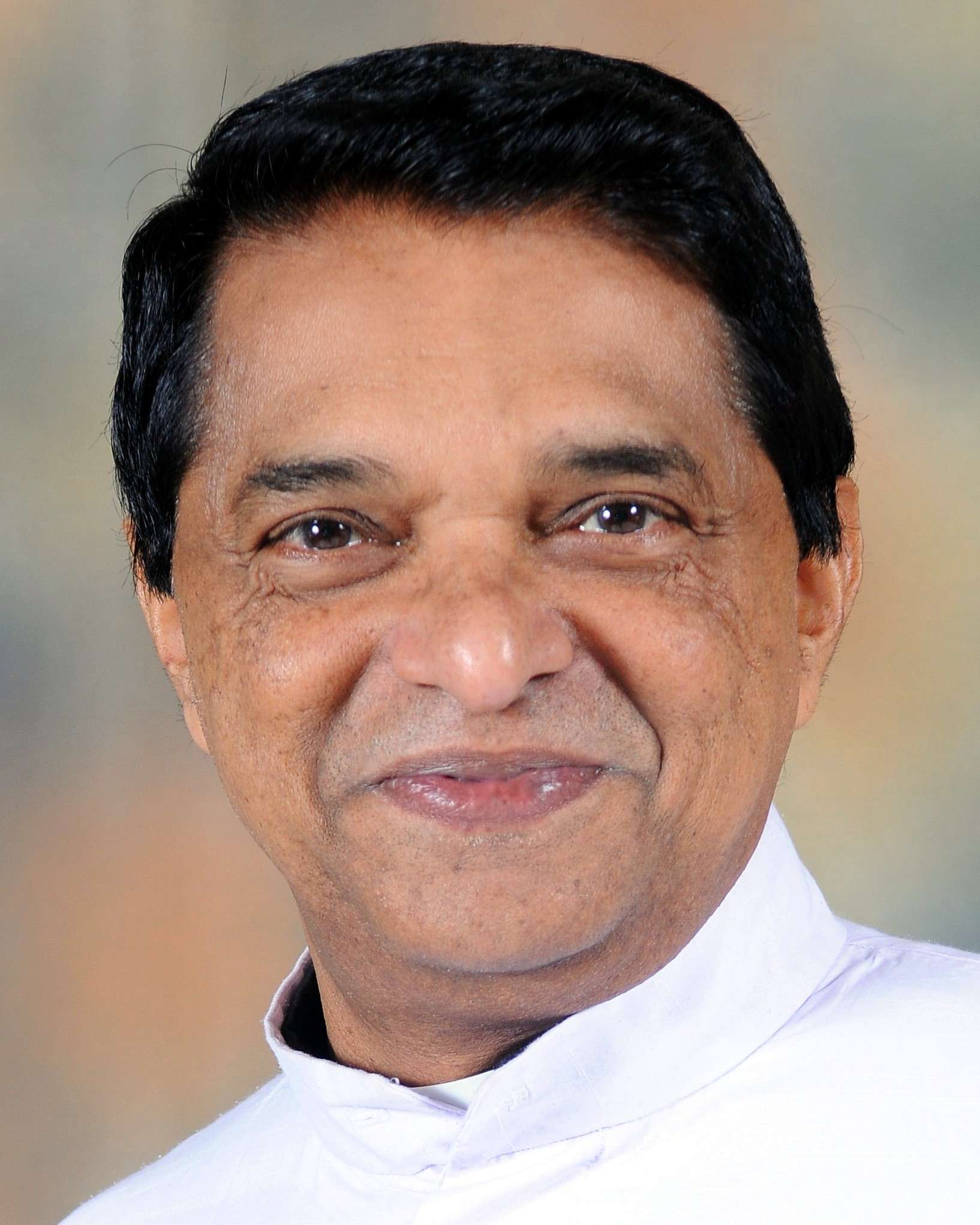
Fr. Abraham Mutholath, the founding pastor of the parish.

St. Mary's Knanaya Catholic Church located in Morton Grove, Illinois, in the United States is the second Knanaya Catholic Church established on 18 July 2010 for Knanaya Catholics living in and around Chicago. Formerly the parish was part of the Knanaya Catholic Mission that was established by the Archdiocese of Chicago on 28 October 1983 for the Knanaya Catholics migrated to Chicago and suburbs from Kerala. With the establishment of the St. Thomas Syro-Malabar Catholic Diocese of Chicago in 2001, the mission came under the new diocese. The mission bought St. James Church in Maywood, Illinois, from the Archdiocese of Chicago in September 2006 under the leadership of the mission director and Vicar General Fr. Abraham Mutholath. Bishop Mar Jacob Angadiath elevated the mission as Sacred Heart Knanaya Catholic Parish on 24 September 2006 with Fr. Abraham Mutholath as the first pastor of the parish.

Considering the size and vast area of the parish, Vicar General Fr. Abraham Mutholath started St. Mary's Knanaya Catholic Parish Unit for the parishioners living in the north side of 90 Expressway with effect from 1 January 2007 and offered Holy Mass on Sunday evening at Our Lady of Victory Church, Chicago. St. Mary's Parish Unit bought a synagogue in Morton Gove and remodeled it as a church under the guidance of the pastor Fr. Abraham Mutholath. Bishop Mar Jacob Angadiath consecrated the church and elevated it as a parish on 18 July 2010.

Now the parish comes under Sacred Heart Knanaya Catholic Forane, Chicago, Knanaya Catholic Region, and St. Thomas Syro-Malabar Catholic Diocese of Chicago. The parish serves around 800 families.

== History ==
=== Knanaya Catholic Mission ===
St. Mary's Knanaya Catholic Parish was formerly a part of the Knanaya Catholic Mission established by the Latin Archdiocese of Chicago from October 28, 1983 and later under the St. Thomas Syro-Malabar Catholic Diocese of Chicago from July 1, 2001. Except the new generation born in the United States, the parishioners are migrants from India and were members of the Knanaya Catholic Archdiocese of Kottayam. The migration began in the 1950s and 60s seeking educational and job opportunities. Later many more came as family members of the early settlers. At their request through Mar Kuriakose Kunnacherry, the Latin Archbishop of Chicago established Knanaya Catholic Mission with Fr. Jacob Chollampel as the first mission director from October 28, 1983. The following priests served the mission under the Latin hierarchy:

1. Fr. Jacob Chollampel (28 October 1983 – September 1985) with residence at St. Ita Church, Chicago
2. Fr. Cyriac Manthuruthil (31 May 1988 – 16 August 1995) with residence at St. Ferdinand Church, Chicago.
3. Fr. Simon Edathiparambil (16 August 1995 – 25 June 1999) with residence at Immaculate Heart of Mary Church, Chicago.
4. Fr. Philip Thodukayil (25 June 1999 – 1 July 2004) with residence at Immaculate Heart of Mary Church, Chicago.

=== Sacred Heart Knanaya Parish ===
Pope John Paul II established the St. Thomas Syro-Malabar Catholic Diocese of Chicago on 13 March 2001 with Mar Jacob Angadiath as its first bishop having jurisdiction over all the Syro-Malabar faithful including Knanaya Catholics all over the United States. The inauguration of the diocese and consecration of the bishop took place on 1 July 2001. The Knanaya Catholic Mission then came under the new diocese.

Bishop Mar Jacob Angadiath recognized Knanaya Catholic Mission of Chicago as part of his diocese and appointed Fr. Abraham Mutholath, as the first Knanaya Catholic Vicar General on October 3, 2001. When Fr. Philip Thodukayil, the then director of the Knanaya Catholic Mission of Chicago left to India, Mar Jacob Angadiath appointed Fr. Abraham Mutholath as the director of the mission on 1 July 2004 in addition to his charge as the Vicar General. Bishop Mar Jacob Angadiath established Knanaya Catholic Region on 28 April 2006. He inaugurated the region at OLV Church on 30 April 2006 and appointed Vicar General Rev. Fr. Abraham Mutholath as Region Director.

=== St. Mary's Parish Unit ===
The Knanaya Catholic Mission of Chicago, under the leadership of Fr. Abraham Mutholath bought St. James Church in Maywood from the Archdiocese of Chicago and started offering Holy Mass on 1 September 2006. Mar Jacob Angadiath elevated the mission as Sacred Heart Knanaya Catholic Parish and appointed Fr. Abraham Mutholath as the first pastor on 24 September 2006. However, Holy Mass was continued at Our Lady of Victory Church, Chicago on Sunday evenings for the convenience of the parishioners on the northern side. For convenience sake, St. Mary's parish unit with Sunday Mass at OLV Church was established for the parishioners in the northern area on 1 January 2007. Since then, attempts were made to buy a church building for the St. Mary's parish unit.

=== St. Mary's Knanaya Parish ===
A Jewish Synagogue at 7800 W. Lyons St., Morton Grove, IL 60053 was available for purchase. St. Mary's Parish Unit bought the synagogue for the establishment of a church on 14 January 2010. Thampy Viruthikulangara, Polson Kulangara, and Stephen Kizhakkekuttu were the fund raising committee coordinators. Biju Kizhakkekuttu, Peter Kulangara and Sabu Tharatthattel were the trustees and Saji Poothrukayil was the DRE. The consecration of the remodeled St. Mary's Church in Morton Grove was held on 18 July 2010. Bishop Mar Jacob Angadiath, Mar Mathew Moolakkatt, Archbishop of Kottayam and Mar Joseph Pandarasseril, the Auxiliary Bishop of Kottayam were the celebrants. Bishop Mar Jacob Angadiath elevated the parish unit as St. Mary's Knanaya Catholic Parish with Fr. Abraham Mutholath as its first pastor in addition to his other assignments as Vicar General and pastor of Sacred Heart Knanaya Catholic Parish, Chicago.

The front elevation of the church was remodeled with the help of Artist Narayanan Kuttappan. Major Archbishop of the Syro-Malabar Church Mar George Alancherry, in the presence of Mar Jacob Angadiath, blessed the remodeled front elevation of the church on 25 October 2011. Bishop Mar Jacob Angadiath relieved Fr. Mutholath from the responsibility of Sacred Heart Knanaya Catholic Parish with effect from 1 January 2012 so he could focus more for the development of the St. Mary's Parish. Bishop Angadiath appointed Fr. Thomas Mulavanal as the Vicar General and Knanaya Region director with effect from 8 February 2014. Bishop appointed him as the pastor of St. Mary's Parish with effect from 18 October 2014 and transferred Fr. Mutholath again as the pastor of Sacred Heart Knanaya Catholic Parish of Chicago. When Bishop Mar Jacob Angadiath elevated Sacred Heart Knanaya Catholic Parish as a forane on 22 March 2015, St. Mary's Knanaya Catholic Parish became part of this forane.

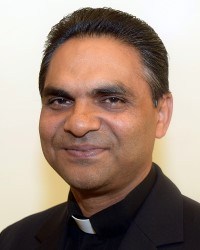
Fr. Thomas Mulavanal, pastor from 18 October 2014

=== Parish cemetery ===
The parishioners wished to have a separate section for the parish at Mary Hill Cemetery in Niles. They approached the Archdiocese of Chicago for permission. The Archbishop granted that wish and the parish got a section at Mary Hill Cemetery. A shrine was installed there to mark the cemetery section in the name of the parish. Vicar General Fr. Abraham Mutholath blessed the shrine on 22 July 2012.

=== Visitation convent ===
At the request of the parishioners, the Visitation Congregation from the Archeparchy of Kottayam started a convent near St. Mary's Knanaya Catholic Parish. Bishop Mar Jacob Angadiath, along with Archbishop Mar Mathew Moolakkatt and Mar Jacob Pandarasseril blessed the convent on 18, July 2010 after the consecration of the church. The sisters serve the parish in its pastoral activities.

== Pastoral programs ==
The parish is active with various pastoral programs with the support of many volunteers. It has a parish council with representatives from various wards, from different ministries, pious associations and other departments.

=== Devotional ===
- Perpetual Adoration
- Bible Classes
- Feasts
- Holy Mass in Malayalam and English
- Prayer Meetings

=== Ministries ===
- Children / Teens Ministry
- Youth Ministry
- Men Ministry
- Women Ministry
- Senior Ministry

=== Pious associations ===
- Cherupushpa Mission League
- Legion of Mary
- St. Vincent de Paul
- Prayer Group

=== Other services ===
- Agape Movement
- Altar servers: Junior and senior teams
- Choir: Children / Youth and Adult
- Christmas Carol during December
- Darsana Samooham for feasts
- Eucharistic Ministers
- Koodara-yogams (Ward Meetings)
- Pilgrimages
- Religious Education School
- Sunday Bulletin

== Chronology ==
- 2004 July 1: Mar Jacob Angadiath appointed Fr. Abraham Mutholath, the vicar general, also as the director of Knanaya Catholic Mission of Chicago
- 2006 September 1: Bought St. James Church in Maywood from the Archdiocese of Chicago for Knanaya Catholic Mission and started offering Holy Mass there.
- 2006 September 24: Mar Jacob Angadiath elevated the Knanaya Catholic Mission to the status of a parish and appointed Fr. Abraham Mutholath as the first pastor.
- 2007 January 1: Fr. Abraham Mutholath started St. Mary's Knanaya Catholic Parish Unit with holy mass on Sunday evenings at OLV Church in Chicago.
- 2009 August 16: General Body at OLV church decided to buy a Jewish Synagogue at 7800 W. Lyons St., Morton Grove, IL 60053 for St. Mary's Knanaya Catholic Church.
- 2009 November 30: Closing of Morton Grove property for the second church at Morton Grove.
- 2010 January 14: St. Mary's Unit officially bought the synagogue.
- 2010 June 11: Inauguration of Morton Grove Knanaya Church Auditorium at Morton Grove by former Chief Minister of Kerala State Mr. Oomman Chandy along with Ramesh Chennithala and M.M. Hassan.
- 2010 July 18: Consecration of St. Mary's Church in Morton Grove by Bishop Mar Jacob Angadiath, Mar Mathew Moolakkatt and Mar Joseph Pandarasseril and its elevation as a parish with Fr. Abraham Mutholath as its pastor.
- 2010 July 18: Blessing of the Visitation Convent building at 7801 W. Maple St., in Morton Grove.
- 2010 August 3: Reception to Cardinal Telesphore P. Toppo, the Archbishop of Ranchi.
- 2010 August 6 – 8: First Solemn Feast of B.V. Mary at St. Mary's Church. Archbishop Mar Mathew Moolakkatt, Bishop Mar Jacob Angadiath, and Bishop Mar George Palliparambil were celebrants. Archbishop of Agra Most Rev. Dr. Albert D’Souza inaugurated the Kala Sandhya.
- 2011 October 25: Major Archbishop Mar George Alancherry blessed the remodeled front elevation of the St. Mary's Church.
- 2012 July 22: Blessing of Knanaya Catholic Cemetery Shrine at Maryhill Cemetery, Niles by Vicar General Fr. Abraham Mutholath.
- 2014 October 18: Vicar General and Knanaya Region Director Fr. Thomas Mulavanal took charge as the pastor.
- 2015 March 22: Bishop Mar Jacob Angadiath elevated Sacred Heart Knanaya Catholic parish as a Forane whereby St. Mary's parish became a part of this forane.

== See also ==
- St. Thomas Diocese of Chicago
- Syro-Malabar Catholic Archeparchy of Kottayam
- Knanaya Region
- Sacred Heart Knanaya Catholic Church, Chicago
- St. Pius X Knanaya Catholic Parish, Los Angeles

== Bibliography ==
- Thoudkayil, Fr. Philip J., "Knanaya Catholic Mission, Chicago," Commemorative Souvenir 2001, Syro-Malabar Catholic Convention, Inauguration of St. Thomas Diocese of Chicago, Episcopal Ordination of Mar Jacob Angadiath, Editor in Chief: George Joseph Kottukappally. Chicago:2001. Print.
- Diocesan Bulletin, The Official Bulletin of St. Thomas Syro-Malabar Catholic Diocese of Chicago, Chicago: October 2001. Print.
- Mathrusmruthi (മാതൃസ്മൃതി), Church establishment Souvenir, St. Mary's Knanaya Catholic Parish, Chicago: 2010. Print & Web
- Karakkatt, Bijo (Executive Editor), Tenth Anniversary Souvenir of Chicago Sacred Heart Knanaya Catholic Forane Parish, 2016. Web.
- Mutholath, Abraham. (2014). Preservation of the Ecclesial Nature of Knanaya Community in North America. Jacob Kollaparambil and Baiju Mukalel, (Eds.). Kottayam: Centenary Symposiums. Kottayam:2014 pp. 497–505. Print.
- Mutholath, Fr. Abraham & George Thottappuram, "വടക്കേ അമേരിക്കയിലെ ക്നാനായ റീജിയന്റെ ഉത്ഭവവും വളർച്ചയും," (The Origin and Growth of the Knanaya Region in North America") Silver Jubilee Souvenir, Kottayam: Missionary Society of St. Pius X, 2009, pp. 51–56. Print.
- Silver Jubilee Souvenir – 2008, Chicago: Sacred Heart Knanaya Catholic Parish. Print. & Web
- Sunday Bulletins of St. Mary's Knanaya Catholic Parish of Chicago. Print & Web.
