= Knanaya Catholic Parish, Los Angeles =

St. Pius X Knanaya Catholic Church, Los Angeles
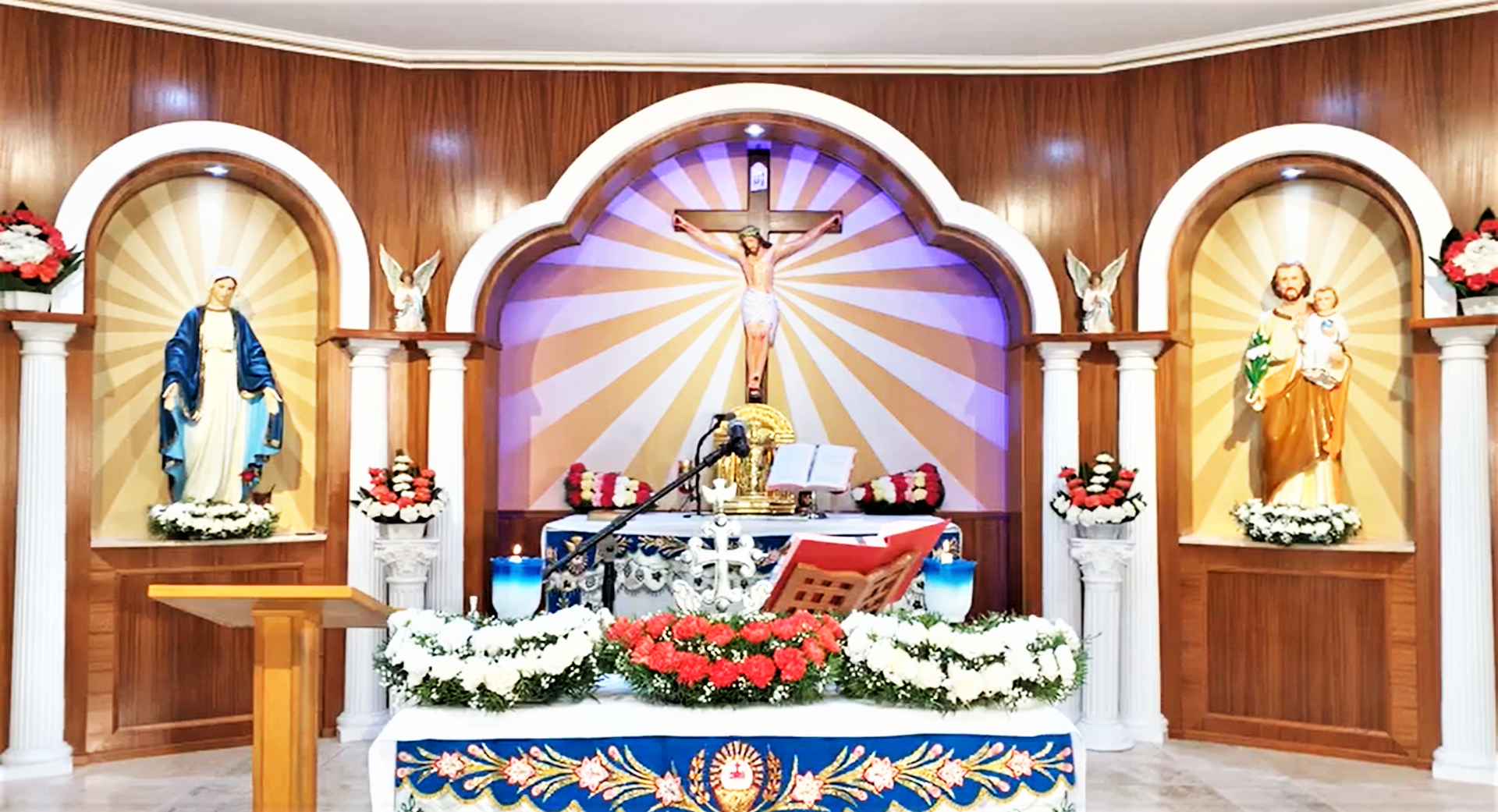
- Church sanctuary
- Location: Montebello, California
- Country: United States
- Denomination: Knanaya Catholic
- Tradition: Syro-Malabar Rite in Malayalam & English
- Website: knanayaregion.us/los_angeles.html

History
- Former name(s): Knanaya Catholic Mission, Los Angeles
- Status: Parish
- Founded: 17 March 2002
- Dedication: St. Pope Pius X
- Events: * 17 March 2002: Mission Started; * 29 July 2010: Consecration of the church and elevation as parish

Administration
- District: Knanaya Catholic Region
- Province: St. Mary's Knanaya Catholic Forane San Jose, CA
- Diocese: Syro-Malabar Catholic Diocese of Chicago

Clergy
- Bishop(s): Mar Joy Alappatt and Bishop Emeritus Mar Jacob Angadiath
- Priest: Fr. Benoy Naramangalath

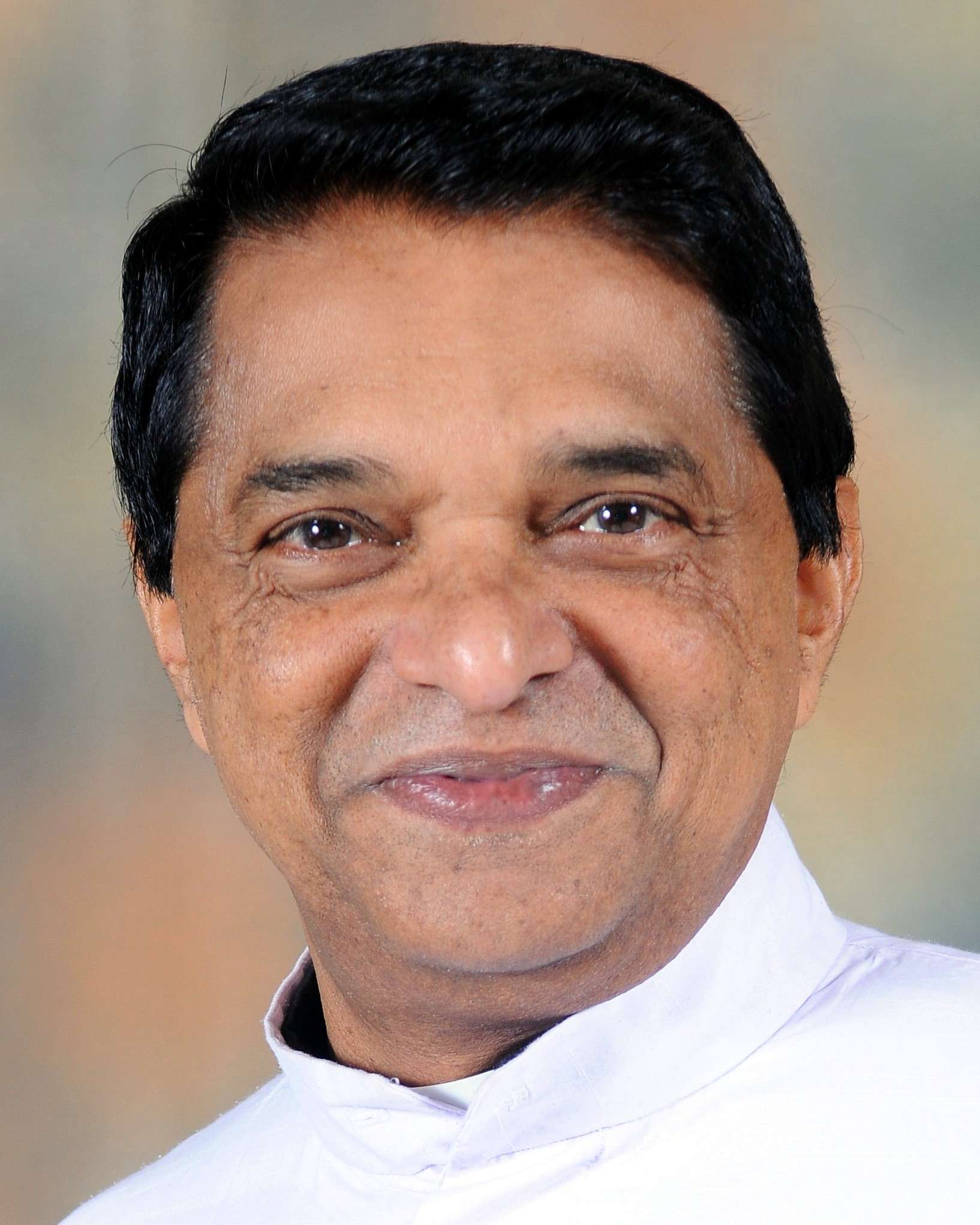
Fr. Abraham Mutholath, the first mission director and first Knanaya Vicar General and Region Director.

St. Pope Pius X Knanaya Catholic Church located in Montebello, California in the US was established as a mission on 17 March 2002 and elevated as a parish on 31 July 2010 for the Knanaya Catholics living in Southern California by Bishop Mar Jacob Angadiath. Before the official establishment of the mission, the community had monthly Syro-Malabar Holy Mass while being members of the local Latin Catholic parishes.

The Knanaya Catholic Mission of Los Angeles bought a church at 124 N. 5th Street in Montebello from Montebello Orthodox Church and converted it as a Syro-Malabar Catholic Church under the leadership of the then mission director Fr. Thomas Mulavanal. Bishop Mar Jacob Angadiath consecrated the church and elevated it as a parish on 31 July 2010. The parish serves around 90 families. Now the parish comes under St. Mary's Knanaya Catholic Forane, San Jose, Knanaya Catholic Region, and St. Thomas Syro-Malabar Catholic Diocese of Chicago.

Two priests who had served the community became vicar generals (Syncellus) of the St. Thomas Syro-Malabar Catholic Diocese of Chicago. Bishop Mar Jacob Angadiath appointed the first mission director Fr. Abraham Mutholath as the first Knanaya Catholic Vicar General of the diocese on 3 October 2003 while serving as the director of this mission. He was later appointed also as the Knanaya Region director on 30 April 2006. The bishop appointed Fr. Thomas Mulavanal as the successor of Fr. Mutholath as the Vicar General and Knanaya Region director on 8 February 2014 while he was serving as the pastor of the parish.

== History ==
=== Catholic associations ===
The Knanaya Catholics who began to migrate to Southern California in the 1970s got organized along with other Kerala Catholics in 1978 to form Kerala Catholic Association. The initial office bearers were Abraham Niravath (president), Jacob Mutholath (secretary) and Paulose Thekkedath (treasurer). Along with social and cultural activities, they also organized monthly Malayalam Mass in the Syro-Malabar rite at the parish hall of St. John Eudes church in Chatsworth. Visiting priests and the priests who came for studies helped to offer the Holy Mass.

When Fr. Abraham Mutholath came to Los Angeles for higher studies in December 1987, he volunteered to help the association in offering monthly Holy Mass and to take care of the pastoral needs of the Syro-Malabar faithful in Southern California. Before his departure back to Kerala, he took initiative in organizing Knanaya Catholic Congress of Southern California (KCCSC) and Knanaya Catholic Youth League (KCYL). The Knanaya Catholic Association continued to organize Syro-Malabar Holy Mass every month with the available priests for the Knanaya Catholic Community in Southern California.

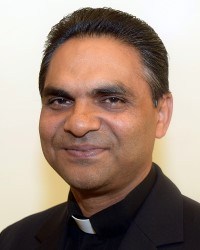
Fr. Thomas Mulavanal, first pastor of the parish, Vicar General and Region Director.

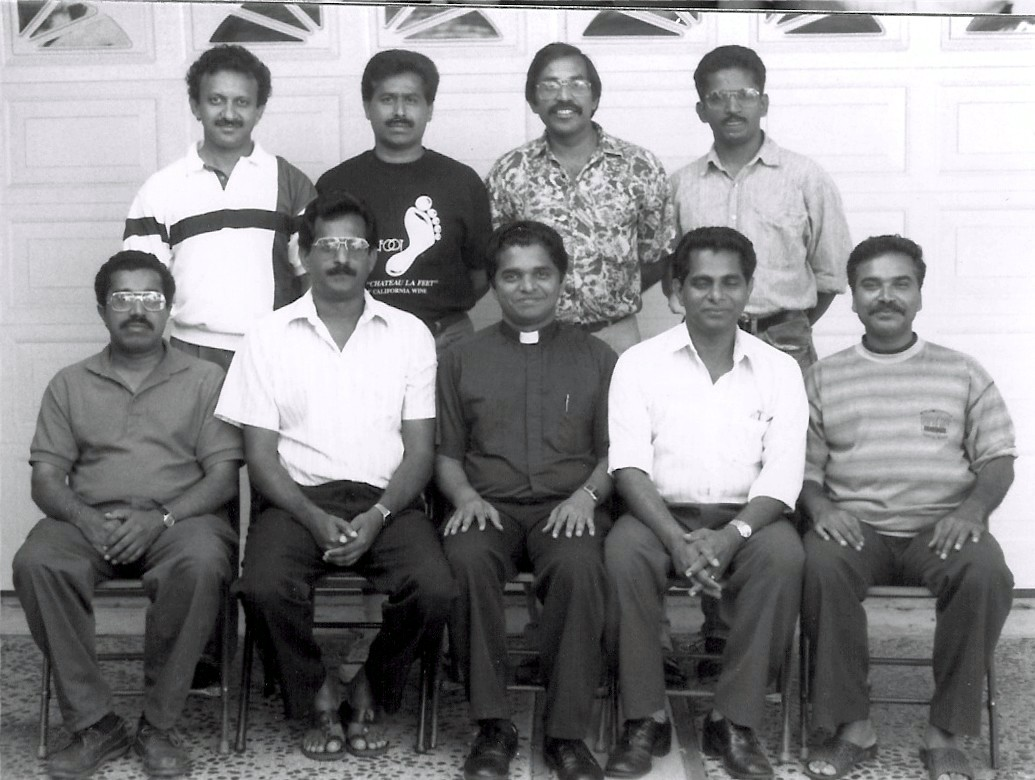
The initial committee of Knanaya Catholic Congress of Southern California on the day of its formation.

Though there were other Knanaya Catholic Youth organizations in the other cities of the US, the first KCYL unit was established in Los Angeles. This unit became a motivating factor for other cities to adapt the same name like the KCYL in the Archdiocese of Kottayam. The first meeting and formation of Knanaya Catholic Congress of North America (KCCNA) was held in 1988 in Los Angeles at the house of Abraham Niravath under the spiritual guidance of Fr. Abraham Mutholath.

When Fr. Abraham Mutholath came back to Los Angeles in December 2000, he again took charge as the spiritual director of the Knanaya Catholic Association of Southern California. He took care of the pastoral needs of the community members including the monthly Holy Mass arranged by the Knanaya Catholic Association.

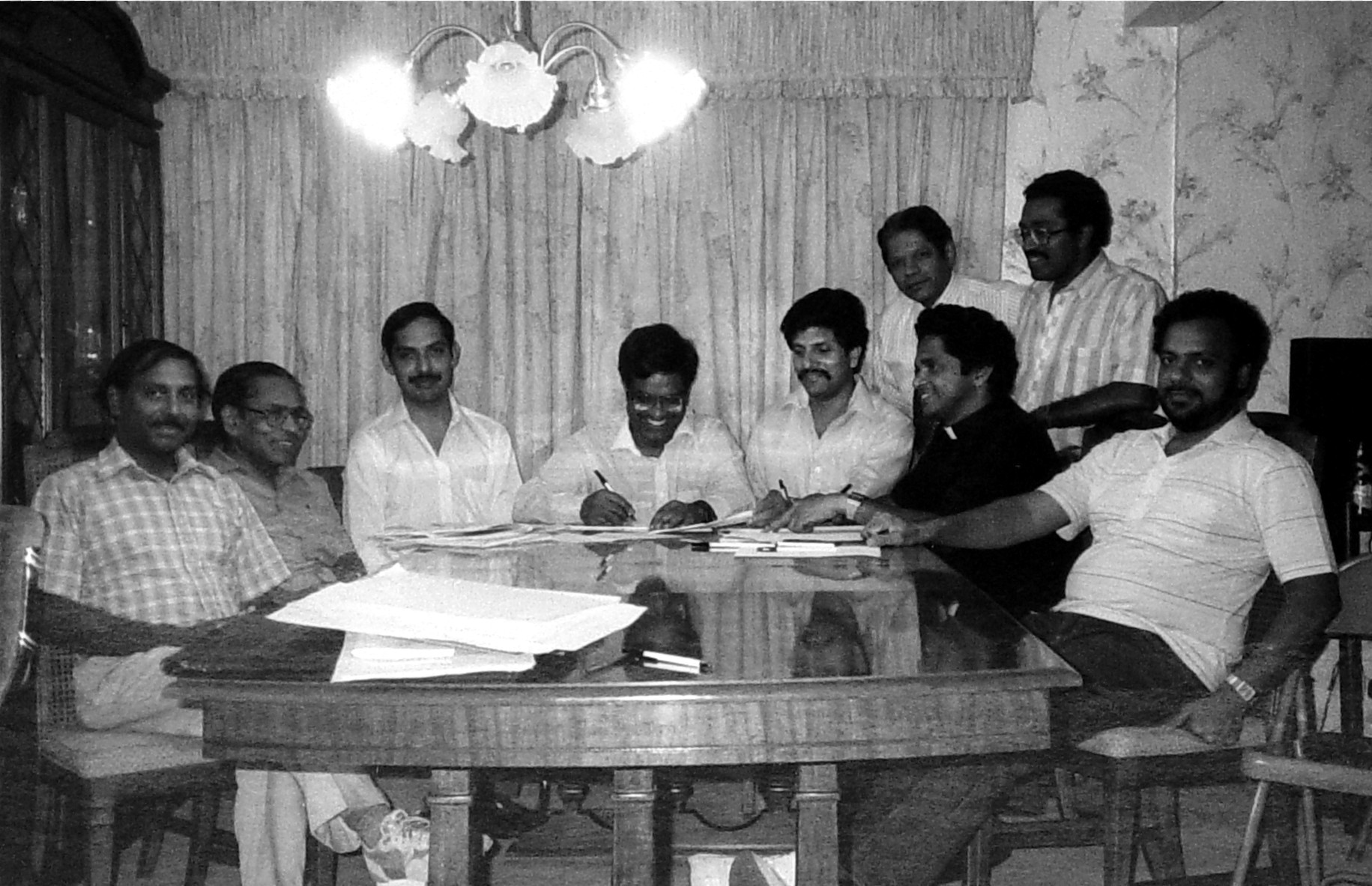
The first committee of KCCNA on the day of its formation in 1988 in Los Angeles.

=== Formation of Mission ===
When Pope John Paul II established the St. Thomas Syro-Malabar Catholic Diocese of Chicago on 13 March 2001 with Mar Jacob Angadiath as its first bishop, he got jurisdiction over the Syro-Malabar faithful including Knanaya Catholics all over the United States. The inauguration of the diocese and consecration of the bishop took place on 1 July 2001. The Knanaya Catholics in Southern California also came under the new diocese.

Considering the need of the time, Fr. Abraham Mutholath held a meeting of the Knanaya Catholics in Southern California along with the Holy Mass on Sunday, 5 August 2001 to decide on applying to Bishop Mar Jacob Angadiath for establishing a Knanaya Mission in Los Angeles. The meeting approved the proposal and also agreed to the suggestion of Fr. Mutholath to propose the name of St. Pius X as the patron of the mission. This was the first mission to select a patron saint. Fr. Abraham Mutholath mailed the application to Mar Angadiath.

Bishop Mar Jacob Angadiath appointed Fr. Abraham Mutholath as the first Syncellus (Vicar General) of the St. Thomas Syro-Malabar Catholic Diocese of Chicago, along with Fr. George Madathiparambil as the Proto-syncellus with effect from 3 October 2001. However, Fr. Mutholath continued his stay in Los Angeles serving also the Knanaya community in Los Angeles.

The Knanaya Catholic Association, along with Kerala Catholic Association under the leadership of Fr. Paul Kottackal, arranged a reception to Mar Jacob Angadiath on 21 December 2001 at St. John Eude's parish hall. Mar Jacob Angadiath established the St. Pius X Knanaya Catholic Mission of Los Angeles with Fr. Abraham Mutholath as the mission director with effect from 17 March 2002. The mission arranged Malayalam Syro-Malabar Holy Mass at St. John Eude's parish hall in Chatsworth and later moved to the Korean Apostolic Church in San Fernando Valley.

When Fr. Abraham Muthoatlh moved to Chicago in February 2003, Fr. Baby Kattiyankel served as the director in charge of the mission. Mar Jacob Angadiath appointed Fr. Thomas Animoottil as the mission director from 2003 to 2005. Fr. Thomas Mulavanal took charge as the mission director on 25 August 2005.

=== Establishment of the Parish ===
The mission director Fr. Thomas Mulavanal motivated the mission members to purchase church for the mission. The general body established a building committee headed by Jacob Mutholath and a finance committee under the leadership of Stephen Vallipadavil. On 24 June 2010, the committees were constituted with Johny Muttathil as the building Committee convener and Jose Vallipadavil as the finance committee convener. After assessing various options, the mission decided to purchase Montebello Orthodox Church that was available for sale.

The escrow was closed on 29 July 2010. The church was then remodeled to make the church suitable for the Syro-Malabar liturgy. His Excellency Mar Jacob Angadiath, along with Archbishop Mar Mathew Moolakkatt and Bishop Mar Joseph Pandarasseril, consecrated the church on 31 July 2010. Mar Jacob Angadiath elevated the mission on the same occasion as a parish with Fr. Thomas Mulavanal as the first pastor of the parish.

Mar Jacob Angadiath appointed Fr. Thomas Mulavanal as the vicar general (syncellus) and Knanaya Region director of the diocese with effect from 8 February 2014. When he moved to Chicago Mar Angadiath appointed Fr. Siju Mudakkodil as the pastor of the parish with effect from 18 October 2014. In 2015, this parish is part of the St. Mary Knanaya Forane Church San Jose. For the perunnals and feast days, statues of St. Mary, St Joseph, St. Stephen and Infant Jesus were purchased and blessed. In 2017, Mar Joseph Pandarasseril has officiated the first holy communion ceremony. During Fr. Siju's term, he and the parish team has renovated the altar buying a new crucifix and new statues of St. Joseph, St. Stephen and St. Pius X from Kerala. The parish celebrated its 10th anniversary of the consecration of the church despite covid-19 issues. After 8 years of service, Fr Siju moved to Chicago and Fr. Benoy Naramangalath became his successor on September 15th, 2023 by Mar Joy Alappatt. He has been appointed as the third vicar of St. Pius X Knanaya Church Los Angeles.

=== Convents ===
The Visitation Congregation of the Archeparchy of Kottayam established a convent in Los Angeles. The sisters came with the arrangements Fr. Abraham Mutholath made with the Sisters of Carondelet in Los Angeles. The Visitation sisters started living in Los Angeles from 22 July 2000. They worked at Daniel Freeman Memorial Hospital in Inglewood owned and administered by the Sisters of Carondelet. The sisters moved to a new convent in Downey on 5 February 2009. Fr. Thomas Mulavanal helped for the purchase of the convent. The convent was officially blessed on 31 July 2010 after the consecration of the St. Pius X Knanaya Catholic Church in Los Angeles.

Fr. Abraham Mutholath took initiative also to bring sisters of St. Joseph's Congregation from the Archeparchy of Kottayam. They arrived on 31 May 2002 and served as West Covina hospital.

== Specialties of this Parish ==
- KCCNA was officially formed in Los Angeles in 1988
- The first KCYL unit in North America was formed in Los Angeles in 1992
- The first Knanaya Mission to host convents in North America
- The mission to select a patron saint for the mission in North America
- This is the first Knanaya mission established by Mar Jacob Angadiath.
- The two vicar generals were selected from this mission / parish.
- The St. Pius X Knanaya Catholic Church Montebello renovated its altar in 2020
- The two former vicars Fr. Thomas and Fr. Siju were appointed as pastors of St. Mary's Knanaya Church Chicago

== See also ==
- St. Thomas Syro-Malabar Catholic Diocese of Chicago
- Syro-Malabar Catholic Archeparchy of Kottayam
- Knanaya Region
- Sacred Heart Knanaya Catholic Parish, Chicago
- St. Mary's Knanaya Catholic Parish, Chicago

== Bibliography ==
- Souvenir 2011, St. Pius X Knanaya Catholic Church Los Angeles, January 2012.
- Thoudkayil, Fr. Philip J., "Knanaya Catholic Mission, Chicago," Commemorative Souvenir 2001, Syro-Malabar Catholic Convention, Inauguration of St. Thomas Diocese of Chicago, Episcopal Ordination of Mar Jacob Angadiath, Editor in Chief: George Joseph Kottukappally. Chicago:2001. Print.
- Diocesan Bulletin, The Official Bulletin of St. Thomas Syro-Malabar Catholic Diocese of Chicago, Chicago: October 2001. Print.
- Mutholath, Abraham. (2014). Preservation of the Ecclesial Nature of Knanaya Community in North America. Jacob Kollaparambil and Baiju Mukalel, (Eds.). Kottayam: Centenary Symposiums. Kottayam:2014 pp. 497–505. Print.
- Mutholath, Fr. Abraham & George Thottappuram, "വടക്കേ അമേരിക്കയിലെ ക്നാനായ റീജിയന്റെ ഉത്ഭവവും വളർച്ചയും," (The Origin and Growth of the Knanaya Region in North America") Silver Jubilee Souvenir, Kottayam: Missionary Society of St. Pius X, 2009, pp. 51–56. Print.
