= Jacob Angadiath =

Indian prelate of the Catholic Church (born 1945)

Mar Jacob Angadiath
- Bishop Emeritus of Syro-Malabar Diocese of Chicago
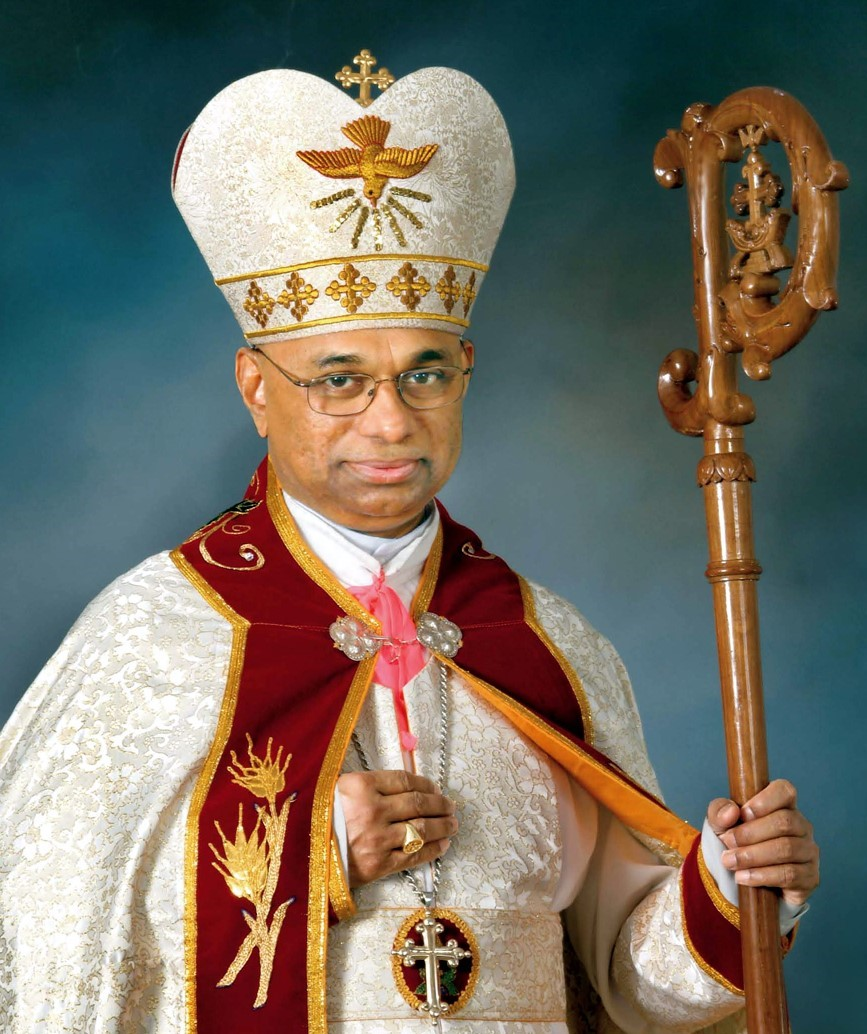
- Church: Syro-Malabar Catholic Church
- Diocese: Syro-Malabar Catholic Eparchy of St. Thomas of Chicago
- Appointed: March 13, 2001
- Installed: July 1, 2001
- Retired: July 3, 2022
- Predecessor: First Eparch
- Successor: Mar Joy Alappatt
- Previous post: Vicar

Orders
- Ordination: January 5, 1972
- Consecration: July 1, 2001 by Varkey Vithayathil, Joseph Pallikaparampil, and Kuriakose Kunnacherry

Personal details
- Born: September 26, 1945 (age 81) Periappuram, Travancore, British India
- Motto: To love, to serve

Styles of Jacob Angadiath
- Reference style: Mar
- Spoken style: Mar
- Religious style: Eparch

Mar Jacob Angadiath (born October 26, 1945) is an Indian prelate of the Catholic Church; he was serving as the first bishop of the St. Thomas Syro-Malabar Catholic Diocese of Chicago from July 2001 until his retirement on July 3, 2022.

== Biography ==
Angadiath was born on October 26, 1945, at Periappuram in the princely state of Cochin (modern day Ernakulam District, Kerala) in India. He was sent to Dallas, Texas, in 1984 under the auspices of the Overseas Mission of the Syro-Malabar Church to initiate a Syro-Malabar ministry in the United States. On July 25, 1992, the St Thomas Syro Malabar Mission Dallas was the first church to be consecrated with Fr. Jacob Angadiath as the first pastor.

== See also ==
- Catholic Church hierarchy
- Catholic Church in the United States
- Historical list of the Catholic bishops of the United States
- List of Catholic bishops of the United States
- Lists of patriarchs, archbishops, and bishops

== Episcopal succession ==
Catholic Church titles
Preceded by First Eparch	Eparch of St. Thomas of Chicago; 2001–2022	Succeeded by Joy Alappat
