= Malayali Americans =

Americans of Malayali birth or descent

മലയാളി അമേരിക്കക്കാർ Malayāḷi Amērikkakkār

Total population
- 146,000 (2009-2013 est.)

Regions with significant populations
- Bergen County, New Jersey; Rockland County, New York; New York City; Chicago metro area; Philadelphia; Dallas–Fort Worth metroplex; Los Angeles

Languages
- Predominantly: Malayalam; American English

Religion
- Predominantly: Hinduism, Christianity; Minority: Islam

Related ethnic groups
- Malayali people; Indian Americans; South Indians

Malayali Americans (Malayalam: മലയാളി അമേരിക്കക്കാർ, romanized: Malayāḷi Amērikkakkār), also known by the term American Malayalees (Malayalam: അമേരിക്കൻ മലയാളികൾ, romanized: Amerikkan Malayalikal), are citizens of the United States of America who belong to the Malayali ethnolinguistic group. Their ancestry originates wholly or partly from the Indian state of Kerala.

== History ==
Malayali nurses were first recruited in Metro New York in the 1960s. They began bringing their families in the 1970s. Later waves in the 1990s into the early 2000s added a contingent of computer and business professionals to the population. Many of these later immigrants were Christians and Hindus, with few Muslims.

Malayali nurses, who were sponsored for jobs, were among the first Indians to settle in the Philadelphia area. Most of them lived in Millbourne.

In recent years, the migration trends of Malayali people shifted to the United States as they seek opportunities.

== Demographics ==
As of 2009–2013, there were approximately 146,000 people with Malayali heritage in the United States, with an estimated 40,000 living in the New York tri-state area. The majority of Malayali Americans live in areas like Bergen County, New Jersey, Rockland County, New York, New York City, Chicago metro area, Philadelphia, Houston, Dallas–Fort Worth metroplex, Los Angeles.

=== Religions ===
The Malayali Religious community in the United States consists of immigrants from Christian, Hindu and Muslim faith communities.

Hinduism

Community organizations such as the Hindu Malayalee Mandalam (HIMAM) – formed in North Carolina in 2016 after informal gatherings since 1999 – actively promote Kerala Hindu cultural traditions, festivals like Vishu, and community cohesion in the Research Triangle area. Similarly, the Association of Tampa Hindu Malayali celebrates Onam annually with traditional performances, youth programs, and community gatherings that reinforce Malayali identity.

==== Islam ====
The Malayali Muslim community in the United States also participates actively in preserving its cultural and religious heritage. Organizations like Malayali Muslims of USA (MMUSA) facilitate community bonding through cultural, matrimonial, and charity-focused programs. The Kerala Muslim Cultural Centre (KMCC USA & Canada) provides broader social welfare services including financial aid, career counseling, and relocation support. In March 2023, North American Malayali Muslims organized the first interfaith Iftaar meet in New Jersey, bringing together over 400 Muslim families and leaders from various faiths to promote interfaith harmony.

==== Christianity ====
Christian sects from Kerala have established multiple worship communities in United States The Syro-Malabar Church, an Eastern Catholic Church, native to India since the 1st-century, established St. Thomas Syro-Malabar diocese of Chicago was established in 2001. St. Thomas Day is celebrated in this church on July 3 every year. Syro-Malankara Catholic Eparchy of the United States of America and Canada is home to 23 parishes and missions in different cities. Its cathedral is the St. Vincent de Paul Syro Malankara Catholic Cathedral in Elmont, New York. Its church includes the St. Jude Syro-Malankara Catholic Church in Bensalem, Pennsylvania. The St. Thomas Syro Malabar Church is a congregation in Framingham, Massachusetts under the jurisdiction of the St. Thomas Syro-Malabar Catholic Diocese of Chicago.

===== Mar Thoma Syrian Church =====
The Mar Thoma Syrian Church established its presence in the United States in the early 1970s, following increased migration of Malayali Christians after the Immigration and Nationality Act of 1965. Early worship gatherings were held in private homes and rented church facilities, with regular services beginning in Queens, New York, in 1972. The first official congregation, Mar Thoma Congregation of Greater New York, was organized in 1976. The Diocese of North America and Europe was formed in 1993, with its headquarters at the Sinai Mar Thoma Centre in Merrick, New York. As of 2020, the diocese consisted of over 70 parishes and congregations across the United States.

===== Malankara Orthodox Syrian Church =====
The Malankara Orthodox Syrian Church began organized worship in the United States during the late 1960s among immigrant families from Kerala, India. The first parish was established in New York in 1970, and in 1979 the American Diocese was formally created under the leadership of Thomas Mar Makarios. His enthronement was held at the Cathedral of St. John the Divine in Manhattan. In 2009, the American Diocese was divided into the Northeast American Diocese, headquartered in Muttontown, New York, and the Southwest American Diocese. Today, the church has numerous parishes, Sunday schools, and charitable activities across the country, maintaining the West Syriac Rite liturgical tradition.

===== Malankara Jacobite Syrian Orthodox Church =====
The Malankara Jacobite Syrian Orthodox Church, under the Holy Apostolic See of Antioch, began its organized presence in the United States in the 1980s with the arrival of clergy and faithful from Kerala. The first parish was formed in 1987, and the church has since established congregations in major cities including New York, Chicago, Dallas, and Los Angeles. Worship is conducted in the West Syriac Rite, and the church functions under the guidance of the Patriarch of Antioch and the Catholicos of India. The community is engaged in pastoral care, Sunday school education, and cultural activities that preserve its heritage.

===== Knanaya Community =====
The Knanaya community, an endogamous ethnic group within the Saint Thomas Christian tradition of Kerala, has established a notable presence in the United States since the late 20th century. Members belong to both the Syro-Malabar Catholic Archeparchy of Kottayam and the Knanaya Jacobite Syrian Orthodox community. The first organized Knanaya Catholic parish in the United States was founded in Chicago in 1983, later becoming the seat of the St. Mary’s Knanaya Catholic Church in Chicago. Today, the Knanaya faithful are served by the St. Mary's Knanaya Catholic Parish, Chicago, and several mission churches, while the Knanaya Jacobite community operates parishes under the Syriac Orthodox Church hierarchy. The community maintains its unique cultural practices, liturgical traditions, and emphasis on preserving endogamy.

=== Language ===
In 1983, the first Kerala Convention was held in New York City, which led to the founding of the Federation of Kerala Associations in North America (FOKANA). FOKANA is a major organization in the United States that promotes the Malayalam language and Malayali culture.

== Culture ==
=== Film and television ===
- Comrade in America (2017)
- Monsoon Mangoes (2016)
- ABCD: American-Born Confused Desi (2013)
- Ivide (2015)
- Ezhamkadalinakkare (1979), the first Malayalam film shot in the US
- Akkare Akkare Akkare (1990)
- Peruchazhi (2014)
- America America (1983)
- Nothing but Life (2004), released as Made in USA in Malayalam
- Ranam (2018)
- Akkarakazhchakal: The Movie (2011)
- Akkara Kazhchakal (2008-2010), television sitcom

== Notable people ==
=== Literature ===
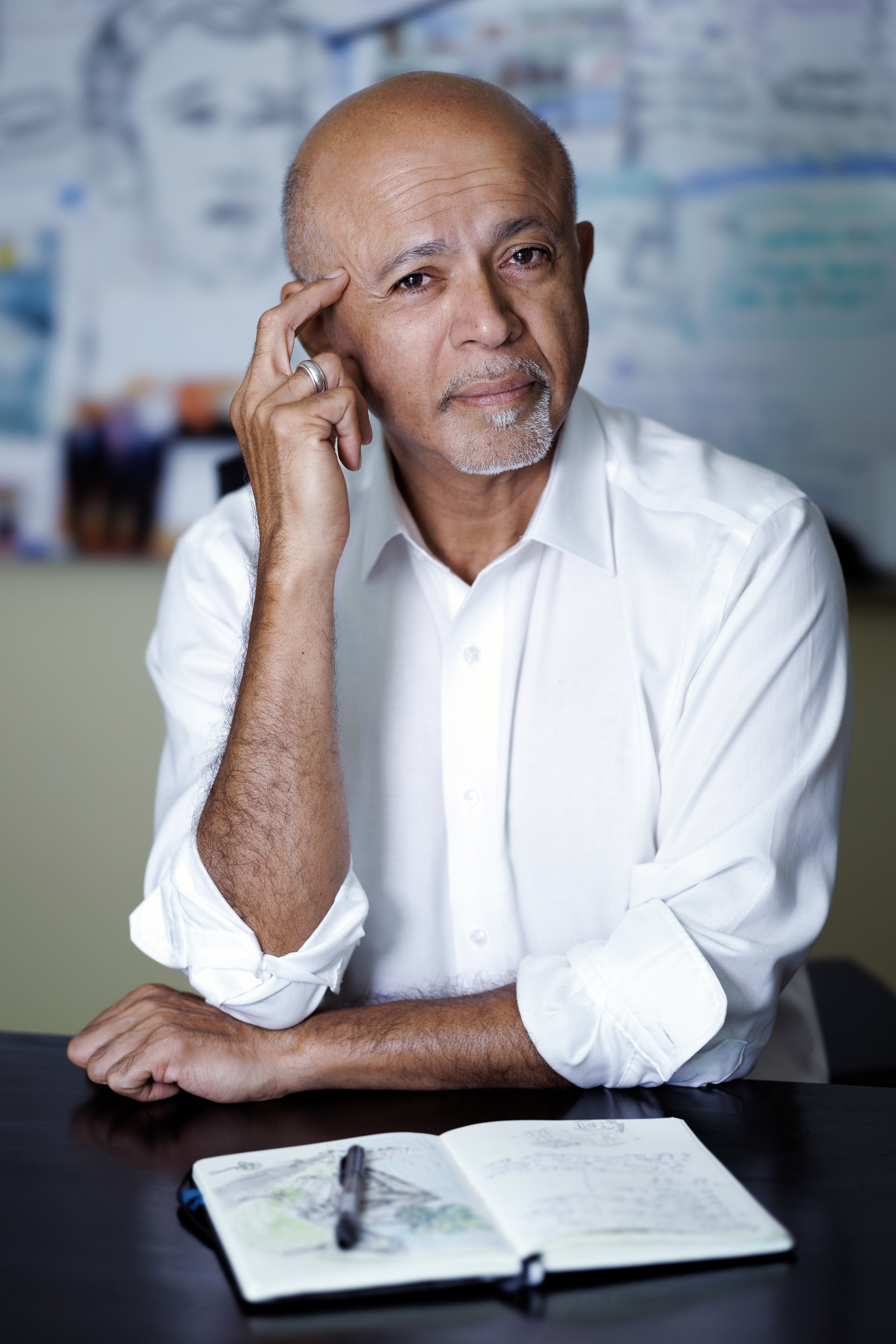
Abraham Verghese, physician and author known for My Own Country, The Tennis Partner, Cutting for Stone and The Covenant of Water

- Meena Alexander, poet, scholar, and writer
- Abraham Verghese, author and physician
- Mira Jacob, writer
- Tania James, novelist
- Aimee Nezhukumatathil, poet and essayist
- Sanjena Sathian, novelist and journalist
- Sarah Thankam Mathews, novelist
- Rajiv Joseph, playwright
- Sandhya Menon, author known for New York Times bestseller When Dimple Met Rishi
- Vijay Menon, writer
- Shanthi Sekaran, novelist and educator

=== Academics ===
==== Mathematicians ====
- N. U. Prabhu, mathematician
- K. C. Sreedharan Pillai, statistician

==== Deans and presidents ====
- Naureen Hassan, American finance executive who serves as the president of UBS Americas; previously served as the first vice president and chief operating officer of the Federal Reserve Bank of New York

==== Economists ====
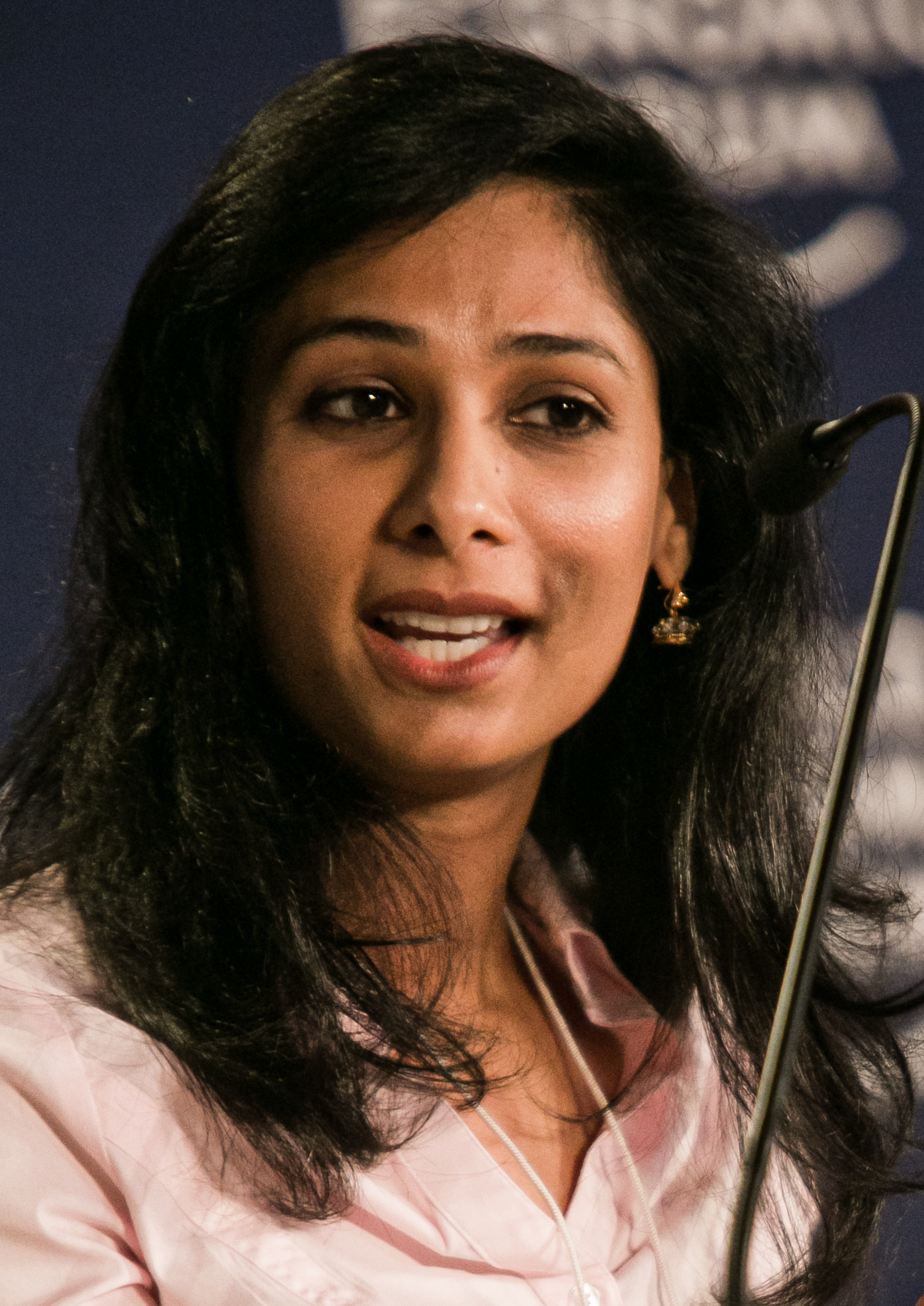
Gita Gopinath, served as the first deputy managing director of the International Monetary Fund (IMF).

- Gita Gopinath, economist; served as the first deputy managing director of the International Monetary Fund (IMF), former chief economist at the IMF and Economic Adviser to the Chief Minister of Kerala

==== Professors ====
- Margaret Abraham, professor of sociology at Hofstra University; served as the 18th president (2014–2018) of the International Sociological Association
- Pulickel Ajayan, professor of engineering at Rice University
- Nalini Ambady, social psychologist and professor of psychology
- K. Mani Chandy, Simon Ramo Professor of computer science at the California Institute of Technology (Caltech)
- Thomas Kailath, professor of engineering at Stanford University
- Prema Kurien, professor of sociology at the Maxwell School of Citizenship and Public Affairs of Syracuse University
- Geeta Menon, Abraham Krasnoff Professor of Global Business and current chair of the Marketing Department at New York University Stern School of Business
- P. K. Ramachandran Nair, Distinguished Professor of Agroforestry and International Forestry at the School of Forest, Fisheries, and Geomatics Sciences (SFFGS), Institute of Food and Agricultural Sciences (IFAS); also an agricultural scientist
- V. Parmeswaran Nair, Distinguished Professor at City College of New York
- Kuzhikalail M. Abraham, professor at Northeastern University, electrochemistry; materials science; lithium, lithium ion, and lithium air batteries
- Unnikrishna Pillai, professor of electrical engineering at the New York University Tandon School of Engineering
- Cyriac Pullapilly, professor of history at Saint Mary's College, Indiana; a Fellow of the Royal Society of Arts; and former priest of the Syro-Malabar Catholic Church

=== Business ===
- George Kurian, business executive; chief executive officer and a member of the board of NetApp; previously executive vice president of product operations at NetApp
- Thomas Kurian, business executive and chief executive officer of Google Cloud (under Alphabet Inc.) since 2019
- Raj Subramaniam, business executive who is the chief executive officer and president of the FedEx Corporation

=== Arts and entertainment ===
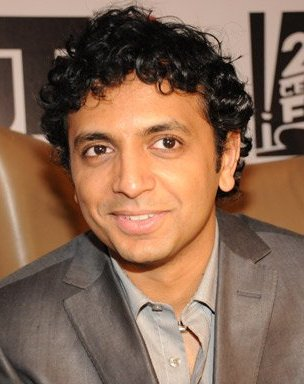
M. Night Shyamalan, Hollywood director

- RK DreamWest, film director, screenwriter, cinematographer
- Benny Mathews, director
- Meera Menon, director, writer, and editor
- Sunil Nayar, television writer and producer
- Gita Pullapilly, film and television director, screenwriter, producer, and author
- Hasna Sal, Glass sculptor, architect, artist and author
- M. Night Shyamalan, director, filmmaker
- Ishana Night Shyamalan, filmmaker, screenwriter and producer; daughter of filmmaker M. Night Shyamalan
- Antony Thekkek, producer, author, and writer
- Julie Titus, model, contestant on America's Next Top Model
- Serena Varghese, voice actress
- Alok Vaid-Menon, writer, performance artist, media personality

==== Actors and actresses ====
- Naveen Andrews, actor
- Melanie Chandra, actress and model
- Anu Emmanuel, actress
- Shishir Kurup, actor
- Jacob Gregory, actor
- Babu Antony, actor
- Anchal Joseph, actress and fashion model
- Mouzam Makkar, actress
- Lakshmi Devy, actress, screenwriter, producer, director

==== Comedians ====
- Paul Varghese, appeared on Last Comic Standing
- Dan Nainan, stand-up comedian

==== Media ====
- Rajiv Chandrasekaran, journalist
- Syma Chowdhry, television host, reporter, and producer
- Liza Koshy, actress, YouTube comedian and television host
- Rajan Devadas, photojournalist
- Suma Josson, journalist and filmmaker
- Vinita Nair, news anchor, news correspondent
- Reena Ninan, Middle East correspondent for Fox News Channel
- Sreenath Sreenivasan, Columbia University professor; WABC-TV technology reporter
- Ishaan Tharoor, journalist
- Arun Venugopal, journalist
- Raj Mathai, television journalist

==== Musicians ====
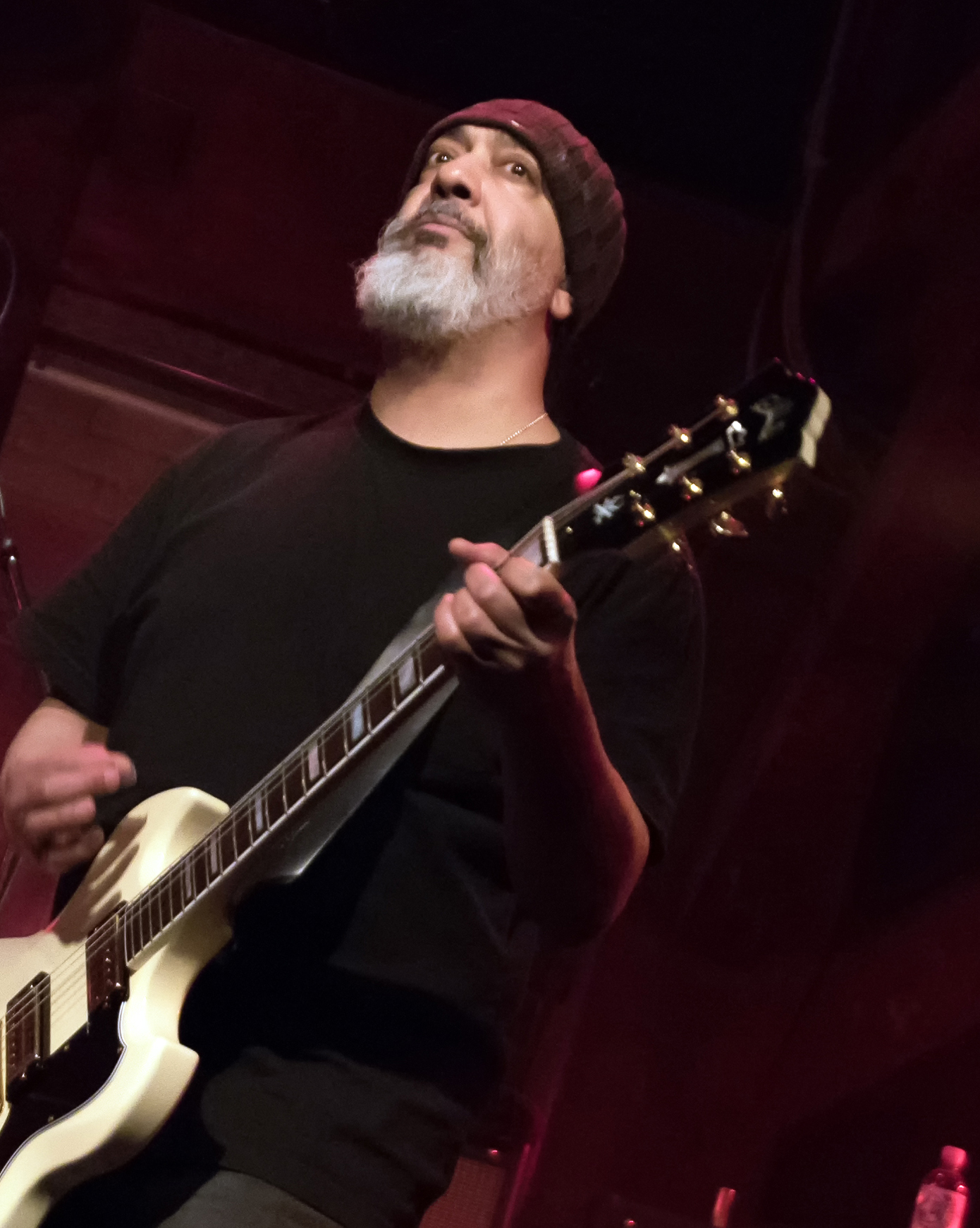
Kim Thayil, musician, has won two Grammy Awards as a member of Soundgarden.

- Mathai, former singer; finalist on season 2 of The Voice
- Kim Thayil, musician and songwriter
- Appu Krishnan, known professionally as The Professor, music producer and songwriter
- George Mathew, conductor and humanitarian advocate
- Saleka, singer-songwriter and actress; daughter of filmmaker M. Night Shyamalan
- Hanumankind, rapper from Kerala who grew up in the US
- Arjun Menon, playback singer and songwriter

=== Sports ===
- Roopa Unnikrishnan, sports shooter and innovation consultant
- Prashanth Nair, cricketer

=== Politics and government ===
- Stanley George, political strategist, known for his advisory role in the U.S. Republican Party and close association with President Donald Trump's political campaigns; also biographer
- Shanthi Kalathil, foreign policy analyst, human rights advocate, former journalist

==== Elected officials ====
- John Abraham, former mayor of Teaneck, New Jersey (Republican)
- Abraham George, businessman and politician from Parker, Texas, who has served as the chairman of the Republican Party of Texas since May 2024
- Nithya Raman, politician serving as the Los Angeles City Council member for the 4th District since 2020; member of the Democratic Party and the Democratic Socialists of America; also urban planner and activist (Democratic)
- Kevin Thomas, represented the 6th district in the New York State Senate from 2019 until 2024 (Democratic)
- Susheela Jayapal, first Indian American to hold an elected office at the county level in Oregon, served as a county commissioner for Multnomah County, Oregon (Democratic)
- Vin Gopal, took office in 2018 to represent the 11th Legislative District in the New Jersey Senate (Democratic)
- Shekar Krishnan, politician who is a member of the New York City Council for the 25th district; also attorney (Democratic)
- Kevin Olickal, member of the Illinois House of Representatives for the 16th district

==== Federal elected officials ====
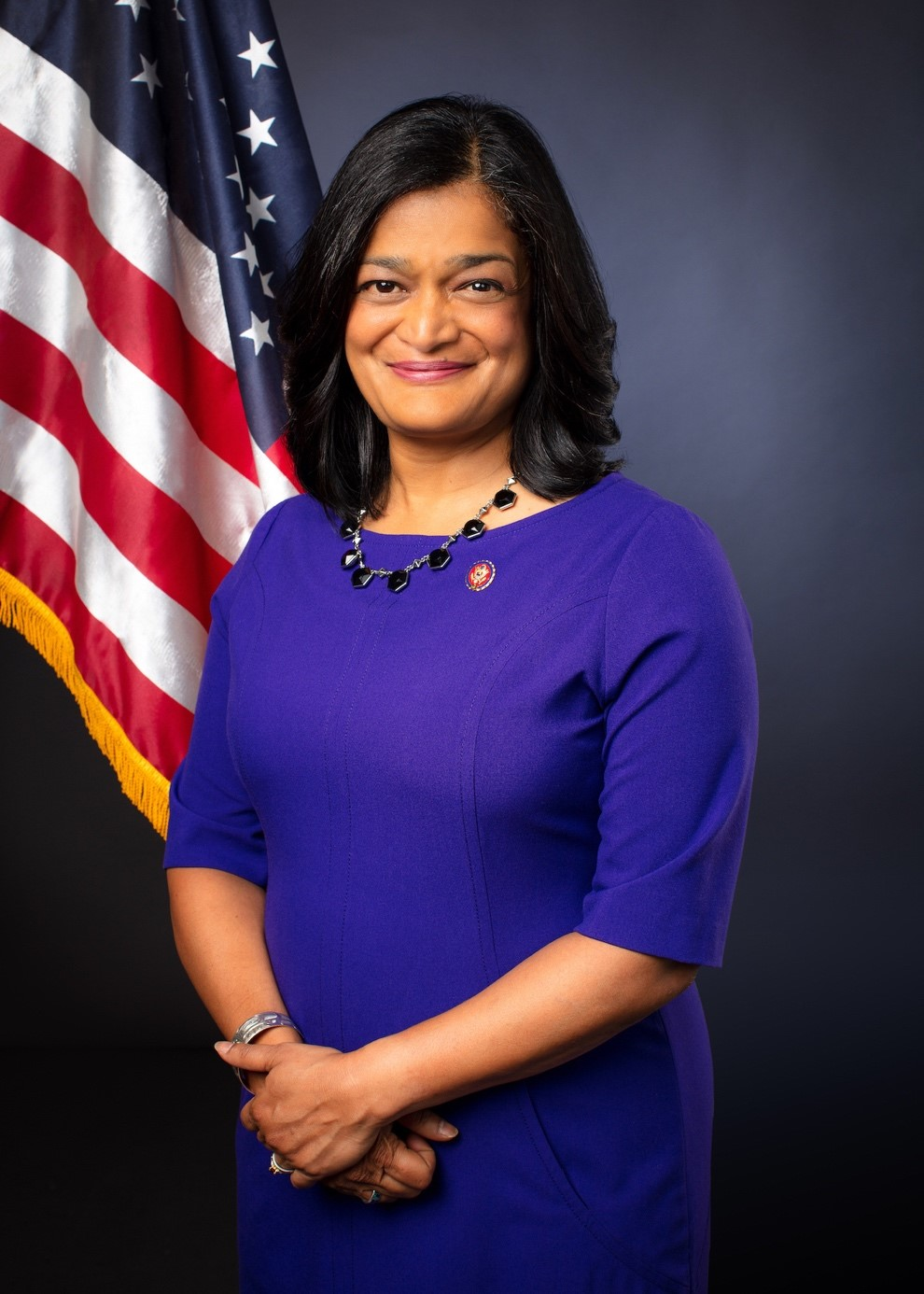
Pramila Jayapal, politician serving as the U.S. representative since 2017.

- Pramila Jayapal, U.S. Representative for Washington's 7th congressional district

==== Civil servants ====
- Joy Cherian, first Asian head of the Equal Employment Opportunity Commission
- Rachel Paulose, former United States Attorney for the District of Minnesota
- Maju Varghese, attorney and political advisor who served as director of the White House Military Office in the Biden administration. He assumed office on March 9, 2021 and left office January 21, 2022.
- Michael Kuruvilla, police officer serving as Chief of Police in Brookfield, Illinois.

==== Federal judges ====
- Juli Mathew, first Indian American judge of the bench of Fort Bend County, Texas since 2023 (Democratic)
- Surendran Pattel, lawyer who is a judge for the 240th Texas District Court in Fort Bend County since 2023

=== Activism and philanthropy ===
- Abraham George, philanthropist, humanitarian, founder of The George Foundation (TGF)
- Ajit George, Chief Operating Officer of Shanti Bhavan Children's Project; Also tabletop role-playing game writer
- Deepika Kurup, clean water advocate and inventor
- Appu Kuttan, philanthropist, consultant, author, and the founder and chairman of the National Education Foundation (NEF)
- Thomas Abraham, founder president of the Global Organization for People of Indian Origin (GOPIO) as well as the National Federation of Indian American Associations (NFIA)

=== Science and technology ===
- Dileep George, artificial intelligence and neuroscience researcher
- Thomas Zacharia, computer scientist; previously deputy director for science and technology at Oak Ridge National Laboratory
- Shree K. Nayar, computer scientist and engineer
- Joy A. Thomas, senior data scientist at Google, information theorist and author
- E. C. George Sudarshan, physicist, author; first to propose the existence of the tachyon
- George Varghese, computer scientist, a professor of computer science and Jonathan B. Postel Chair in Networking in the UCLA Henry Samueli School of Engineering and Applied Science, author

==== Medicine ====
- Paul Antony, physician executive and former Chief Medical Officer for the Pharmaceutical Research and Manufacturers of America (PhRMA)
- Devi Nampiaparampil, physician, journalist, actress
- Shelby Kutty, cardiologist, academic, and healthcare executive

=== Religion and spirituality ===
- Joy Alappatt, bishop of the Syro-Malabar Catholic Church
- Vishnudevananda Saraswati, yoga guru, founder of the International Sivananda Yoga Vedanta Centres and Ashrams (ISYVC)
- Winnie Varghese, dean of the Cathedral of St. John the Divine
- Titus Yeldho, Archbishop and Patriarchal Vicar of the Malankara Archdiocese of the Syriac Orthodox Church in North America

=== Crime ===
- Sneha Anne Philip, missing person
- Anand Jon, convicted rapist and fashion designer
- Shelley Malil, convicted of attempted premeditated murder and assault; former actor

== See also ==
- Malayali diaspora
- Indian Americans
- List of Indian Americans
- Bengali Americans
