= Varghese =

Name list

Varghese is a Syriac–Malayalam form of the Assyrian Syriac/Aramaic Christian name Giwargis, the Syriac equivalent of George.

The related Malayalam variants include Varughese, Verghese, Geevarghese, Varughis, and Varkey. It is given as first, middle, or last name among the Syrian Christians, an ancient community of Christians from Kerala, India.

The pronunciation from Syriac/Aramaic was naturally adapted to fit the vowels of the local dialect. Many names of this community are a combination of Aramaic and Hebrew names, that have been adapted into the local dialect.

== Giwargis ==
- Giwargis of Christ
- Giwargis of the Cross
- Giwargis Warda

== People named Varghese ==
- George Alencherry - Cardinal of the Syro-Malabar Catholic Church

=== Varghese as given name ===
- Geevarghese Mar Gregorios, Christian saint canonized by the Malankara Orthodox Syrian Church and Syriac Orthodox Church
- Geevarghese Mar Dionysius of Vattasseril, Christian saint of the Malankara Orthodox Syrian Church
- Verghese Kurien (1921–2012), recipient of Padma Vibhushan and known as "Father of the White Revolution"
- Varghese Mathai, professor of mathematics at University of Adelaide
- Varghese Daniel (born 1956), cricketer
- Varghese Johnson (born 1982), boxer
- Varghese Payyappilly Palakkappilly (1876–1929), venerable canonized by the Syro-Malabar Church
- Arikkad Varghese (1938–1970), murdered activist

=== Varghese as last name ===
- Abraham Verghese (born 1955), professor of medicine at Stanford University Medical School, author, and recipient of National Humanities Medal
- Aju Varghese Indian film actor, producer, director Malayalam
- B. G. Verghese (1927–2014), Indian information adviser to Prime Minister Indira Gandhi
- Dhanya Mary Varghese, Indian actress
- George Varghese, a principal researcher at Microsoft Research
- Abi Varghese, Indian-American writer-director-producer
- Serena Varghese, American voice actress
- N. F. Varghese, Malayalam film actor
- Antony Varghese, Malayalam film actor
- Balu Varghese, Malayalam film actor
- Honey Rose, Malayalam film actress
- Mary Verghese, Recipient of Padma Shri
- T.M. Varghese, Indian Freedom-fighter and lawyer
- Paul Varghese, stand-up comedian
- Peter Varghese, Australian diplomat and secretary of the Department of Foreign Affairs and Trade
- Reggie Verghese (1947–2015), Singaporean musician and record producer, former member of Singaporean band The Quests
- Sijoy Varghese, Indian ad film director/producer, event director, screenwriter and actor
- Winnie Varghese (born 1972), 12th dean of the Cathedral of St. John the Divine in New York City
- Fr. Baby Varghese, author and professor of Syriac studies, liturgy, and sacramental theology at Orthodox Theological Seminary, Kottayam
- Sugith Varughese (born 1957), Indian-born Canadian writer, director, and actor

=== Varkey ===
- Varkey Vithayathil - Cardinal of the Syro-Malabar Catholic Church
- Sunny Varkey, education entrepreneur and education philanthropist

== See also ==
- People from Kerala
