= The Covenant of Water =

2023 novel by Abraham Verghese

- 2023 cover
- Author: Abraham Verghese
- Illustrator: Thomas Verghese
- Cover artist: Kelly Winton
- Language: English
- Publisher: Grove Atlantic
- Publication date: 2023
- Publication place: United States
- Pages: 736
- ISBN: 978-0-8021-6217-5

The Covenant of Water is a 2023 novel by physician and author Abraham Verghese. The book tells the story of a Malayali family living in southwest India, in the State of Kerala, with the narrative spanning three generations, from 1900 to 1977. In each generation, some members of the family die by drowning because of an affliction they refer to as "the Condition".

== Plot ==
The novel revolves around three generations of a family of Orthodox Saint Thomas Christians living in the fictional town of Parambil, in the southwest Indian state of Kerala. The narrative begins in 1900 with a 12-year-old girl named Mariamma who moves to Parambil to marry a 40-year-old widower—variously called Big Appachen and the Thamb'ran—in an arranged marriage. Mariamma soon learns of a problem in the family, which they call "the Condition": in each generation, at least one member of the Thamb'ran's extended family dies from drowning under suspicious circumstances, so he has never been on a boat. The issue is documented with symbols in a family tree called "the Water Tree".

Mariamma's marriage blossoms into a loving one. She is close to her stepson, JoJo, who calls her Big Ammachi (Malayalam: അമ്മച്ചി, lit. 'Big Mother'). Just after Big Ammachi gives birth to her first child, a girl, in 1908, JoJo drowns in a nearby irrigation ditch. The baby girl, who has developmental disabilities, is called Baby Mol ('daughter'); Big Ammachi and Big Appachen later have a boy, whom they name Philipose. Big Appachen, as he gets older, begins to exhibit strange behavior and possible symptoms of stroke. After he dies, Big Ammachi becomes the overseer of the 500-acre (2.0 km^{2}) family estate and the matriarch of the family.

Meanwhile, Digby Kilgour, a physician who was unable to get the surgical training he needed in Scotland due to institutional anti-Catholic bias and his lower-class background, joins the Indian Medical Service in Madras. There he has an affair with Celeste Arnold, his boss's wife. She dies in a fire, and Digby is severely burned when he tries to save her. He eventually meets Dr. Rune Orqvist, a Swedish surgeon who operates a leprosarium in the region. Dr. Orqvist attempts to repair Digby's hands and enlists Elsie, a friend's 10-year-old daughter, to assist with his rehabilitation by helping him relearn how to draw.

Later, Philipose, who is partially deaf, grows up to be a writer and marries Elsie, who has become an artist. They have a son named Ninan, who dies, and a daughter named Mariamma after Big Ammachi. When Elsie disappears and is presumed dead, Big Ammachi, who believes Elsie committed suicide by drowning, helps Philipose rear Mariamma. Philipose had become addicted to opium after he broke his ankles trying to save Ninan but a friend and employee helps him recover.

Mariamma grows up to be a physician. After Philipose drowns, she convinces one of her instructors to autopsy her father's body. The information helps solve the mystery of "the Condition", which is revealed to be neurofibromatosis type II—a genetic disease that causes benign tumors throughout the central and peripheral nervous systems, including nerves connected to the vestibular system.

Mariamma reads her father's journals in order to learn more about possible psychiatric effects of the disease, but learns that Philipose was not her biological father, and he knew it, though he never told anyone and treated her as his daughter. She suspects that Digby Kilgour is her biological father and visits him at the leprosarium he has taken over managing after Dr. Orqvist's death. There she learns that Digby is indeed her father and that her mother is actually still alive but has leprosy, which has now left her blind. She left Mariamma with Philipose and Big Ammachi and faked her death when she learned she had the disease, not wanting to pass it to her daughter or give her the social stigma of being a leper's daughter, and went to the leprosarium, where Digby has cared for her.

== Main characters ==
- Big Ammachi (Mariamma) - lead character, 12-year-old bride who becomes the matriarch of the family
- Big Appachen - widower, husband of Big Ammachi
- JoJo - son of Big Appachen and his first wife; step-son of Big Ammachi
- Baby Mol - daughter of Big Ammachi and Big Appachen
- Philipose - son of Big Ammachi and Big Appachen; writer
- Elsie - wife of Philipose; artist
- Ninan - son of Elsie and Philipose
- Digby Kilgour - Scottish doctor who immigrates to India to get training in surgery
- Claude Arnold - British-educated surgeon; Digby's boss
- Celeste Arnold - Claude's wife; Digby's first love
- Mariamma - daughter of Philipose and Elsie; Big Ammachi's namesake and supposed granddaughter; doctor
- Rune Orqvist - Swedish surgeon who runs the Saint Bridget's leper colony
- Shamuel - a member of the pulayar caste; foreman of Parambil and Big Appachen's friend
- Joppan - son of Shamuel and his wife Sara; Philipose's best friend

== Major themes ==
- The caste system in India and the class system in the United Kingdom
- Social upheavals, the British colonial presence in India, and the move toward socialism
- Family structure in India
- Faith and doubt
- Love and loss

== Background ==
The novel was inspired by the life story of Verghese's mother Mariamma, to whom the book is dedicated, and is set in southern India where the author's family came from. The book is his fourth, following two non-fiction accounts of his experiences treating AIDS and addiction plus his first novel Cutting for Stone. Verghese originally became a writer when he took a break from his work with AIDS patients and joined the Iowa Writers Workshop at the University of Iowa, where in 1991, he completed a Master of Fine Arts.

== Reception ==
Overall, reviews for the book were positive.

The novel was chosen as an Oprah's book club selection, and she hosted Super Soul Presents: Oprah's Book Club — The Covenant of Water Companion Podcast, a 6-part series of interviews with Verghese. In January 2024, Oprah announced that she had optioned the film rights. The book was one of the most borrowed titles in American public libraries during 2023 and 2024.

In a mixed review in the New York Times, writer Andrew Solomon criticized the book for not incorporating more subtleties or complexities of Indian culture, stating: "This novel recalls the curry one might get in a small American farm town: exotic by local standards, not wrong in any way, but substantially softened for the locals". Solomon further criticized the characters' development stating the novel "focuses almost entirely on good people (to whom many terrible things happen), and given the complexity of human beings, the surfeit of grace sometimes feels unrealistic and even pretentious...". However, in conclusion, Solomon stated: "While I don't entirely believe in Verghese's characters, I am moved by how much he loves them and, in so doing, makes the reader love them." and "It is a better world for having a book in it that chronicles so many tragedies in a tone that never deviates from hope".

In a positive review, writing for NPR, Jenny Bhatt stated of Verghese's storytelling: "Verghese threads meaningful connections between macrocosmic and microcosmic details so elegantly that they are often barely noticeable at first." She further states: "Verghese takes his time to reveal how everything, like the waterways there, is connected and eventually flows together".

Writing for The Washington Post, Joan Frank states of Verghese's character development: "Verghese's compassion for his ensemble, which subtly multiplies, infuses every page. So does his ability to inhabit a carousel of sensibilities - including those of myriad women - with penetrating insight and empathy. In conclusion, Frank stated: "The further into the novel readers sink, the more power it accrues".

The book stayed on The New York Times bestseller list for 37 weeks. The newspaper also listed The Covenant of Water as one of its 100 Notable Books of 2023.

Verghese was a finalist for the 2024 Audie Award for Narration by the Author.
