= Malayali diaspora =

Malayali people living outside India

മറുനാടൻ മലയാളികൾ

Total population
- c. 6 million (including 3.5 million Kerala Gulf diaspora) (2020 est.)

Regions with significant populations
- United Arab Emirates: 773,000
- Kuwait: 634,738
- Saudi Arabia: 595,000
- Qatar: 445,000
- Malaysia: 228,900
- Oman: 195,300
- Bahrain: 101,556
- United States: 84,000
- Canada: 77,910
- Australia: 53,206
- United Kingdom: 45,264
- Singapore: 26,000
- Ireland: 24,674
- New Zealand: 6,800
- Germany: 5,867
- Indonesia: 4,000
- Austria: 3,784
- Japan: 500
- Finland: 474

Languages
- Malayalam

Religion
- Predominantly: Hinduism; Minority: Islam Christianity; Buddhism, Judaism, Atheism and others

Related ethnic groups
- Malayali
- Tamils
- Tuluvas
- Kodava
- Kannadigas

The Malayali Diaspora refers to the Malayali people who live outside their homeland of the Indian state of Kerala and the Union Territories of Mahé, India and Lakshadweep. They are predominantly found in the Persian Gulf, North America, Europe, Australia, Caribbean, Africa and other regions around the world.

== Migration Patterns and History ==
=== Early Migration ===
The early 20th-century migration of Malayalis to countries like Malaysia and Singapore was largely driven by opportunities in plantation work. Many Malayalis moved to these regions to work in rubber and other plantations.

=== Gulf Boom ===
During the oil boom of the 1970s and 1980s, there was large-scale migration of Malayalis and other Indians to the Persian Gulf countries which came to known as Gulf Boom. The demand for labor in construction, healthcare, and other sectors attracted a significant number of Malayalis to countries like Saudi Arabia, the United Arab Emirates, Kuwait, and Qatar.

== Recent Trends ==
In recent years, the migration trends have shifted towards North America, Europe, and other parts of the world. Malayalis are now seeking opportunities in countries like the United States, Canada, the United Kingdom, Australia, and Germany.

== Socio-Economic Impact ==
=== Skill and Knowledge Transfer ===
The Malayali diaspora has also contributed to skill and knowledge transfer, especially in sectors like healthcare, IT, and education. Many NRKs (Non-Resident Keralites) have brought back valuable expertise and have helped in the development of these sectors in Kerala.

== Cultural Preservation and Festivals ==
=== Onam ===
Onam is the secular harvest festival celebrated with great enthusiasm by Malayalis worldwide. It is marked by various cultural activities, including traditional dances, music, and feasts.

=== Vishu ===
Vishu is the New Year festival of Kerala, celebrated by arranging the "Vishukkani" (a ceremonial arrangement of auspicious items). This festival is also widely celebrated by the Hindu Malayali diaspora.

=== Malayalam Language ===
Efforts to promote and preserve the Malayalam language are made through cultural associations, schools, and media. These organizations often offer Malayalam language classes and organize cultural events to keep the language and traditions alive.

== Challenges Faced by the Diaspora ==
=== Identity and Integration ===
Balancing cultural identity with integration into the host society is a challenge faced by the Malayali diaspora. While maintaining their cultural heritage, they also strive to integrate and contribute to the host country's society.

=== Legal and Labor Issues ===
Issues related to legal status, labor rights, and working conditions are significant, particularly for those residing in nations of the GCC. Many Malayalis face challenges related to visa regulations, labor contracts, and working conditions.

=== Social Support Systems ===
Community organizations play a vital role in providing social support and addressing issues like mental health and family separation. These organizations offer various services to help Malayalis cope with the challenges of living abroad.

Contributions to Literature and Arts

=== Literature ===
Works by Malayali writers in exile or those writing about the diaspora experience have enriched the literary world. Authors like Arundhati Roy and M. T. Vasudevan Nair have made significant contributions.

=== Cinema ===
The influence of the diaspora on Malayalam cinema is notable, with films depicting the life of Malayalis abroad. Movies like "The Goat Life (Aadujeevitham)", "Varavelpu" and "Arabikkatha" highlight the experiences of Malayalis in the Gulf.

=== Music and Dance ===
Traditional music and dance forms like Kathakali and Mohiniyattam play a crucial role in cultural preservation. These art forms are promoted through cultural events and organizations within the diaspora.

== Cultural and Religious Aspects ==
A majority of the Malayali diaspora practices Hinduism, with minorities practicing Islam, Christianity, Buddhism, Judaism and other religions. The diaspora maintains strong cultural ties to Kerala, often celebrating traditional festivals and preserving their language, Malayalam.

In Malaysia, the Malayali community has been present since the early 20th century and has significantly contributed to the country's development, particularly in the plantation sector. The community has established various cultural and social organizations to promote and preserve their heritage.

In the United States, Canada and Middle East, Malayalis have formed numerous cultural associations and organizations to maintain their cultural identity and provide support to new immigrants. These organizations often organize events, such as Onam and Vishu celebrations, to bring the community together.

== Economic Contributions ==
The Malayali diaspora has made significant economic contributions to their host countries and their homeland. In the Persian Gulf countries, many Malayalis work in various sectors, including healthcare, engineering, education, and construction. Their remittances have played a crucial role in the economic development of Kerala.

According to the World Bank, India received around $83 billion in remittances in 2020, with a significant portion coming from the Malayali diaspora in the Gulf countries. These remittances have helped improve the living standards of families in Kerala and have contributed to the state's overall development.

== Loka Kerala Sabha ==
The Loka Kerala Sabha is an assembly hosted by the Government of Kerala to bring the Malayali diaspora under one platform. It was hosted under the Department of Non-Resident Keralites. It aims at utilizing the expertise of NRKs for developing Kerala as a state. The Loka Kerala Sabha is proposed to happen once in two years. The event was inaugurated by the Chief Minister of Kerala, Pinarayi Vijayan.

== See also ==
- Malayali
- Kerala Gulf diaspora
- Malaysian Malayali
- Malayali Americans
- Malayali Australians
- Dravidians
- Tamil diaspora
- Telugu diaspora
