= Sugith Varughese =

Indian actor (born 1957)

- Born: 25 April 1957 (age 69); Cochin, Kerala, India
- Occupations: Actor; writer; director
- Years active: 1983–present

Sugith Varughese (born 25 April 1957) is an Indian actor, writer and director.

== Early life and education ==
Varughese was born in Cochin, Kerala, India, into a Syriac Saint Thomas Christian family. (Note: "Varughese," also sometimes spelled "Varghese" and "Verghese" and variously pronounced, is Syriac-Malayalam for "George") His family moved to Saskatoon, Saskatchewan, when he was a child, when his neurosurgeon father obtained a professional appointment there.

Varughese began university studies at the University of Saskatchewan in Saskatoon with a double major in pre-medicine and drama. He continued on to an undergraduate degree in drama at the University of Minnesota in Minneapolis and a Master of Fine Arts at York University in Toronto. He went on to write, act in and direct film and television productions in Canada and the United States, and was accepted to attend the Canadian Film Centre as a writer-director. As a director, he has been nominated for and won several Canadian film and television and international film festival awards. He also holds a black belt in karate.

== Career ==
=== Actor ===
Television

Varughese made his screen debut on television in 1983, and was nominated for an ACTRA Award for his first role in the CBC-TV movie, Best of Both Worlds. Some of his other television movie roles include the Transcorp Reporter in Overdrawn at the Memory Bank (1984), and Patal in Solar Attack (2006).

In television series, Varughese was a regular as Aftab in the CBC-TV comedy An American in Canada (aka Frostbite in Australia) for which he received a Gemini Award nomination for Best Ensemble Performance. Other recurring roles include Palash on OMNI TV's nighttime soap opera Metropia, Faisal on Little Mosque on the Prairie, Tariq Barr on the Starz series The Girlfriend Experience, Mr. Mehta on Kim's Convenience, David Paster for three episodes of The Expanse (2021), and Aajay Singh on the CTV series Transplant. His television guest appearances include the crime-fighting series Counterstrike (1992), the action/crime drama Kung Fu: The Legend Continues (1993), the film-based thriller F/X: The Series (1996), the adventure series Veritas: The Quest (2003), and a role as the informant on 72 Hours: True Crime (2004).

Film

Some of his theatrical film appearances include the psychological slasher Orphan (2009), and the science fiction film Mission to Mars (2000).

Theatre

Varughese's stage roles and venues include the following.

- Estelle Singerman (Harold Green Jewish Theatre Company)
- The Wrong Bashir (Crow's Theatre)
- The Men in White (Factory Theatre)
- Animal Farm (Soulpepper Theatre)
- Little Pretty and the Exceptional (Factory Theatre) for which he was nominated a Dora award for Outstanding Performance-male
- The Postman (Panamania) (also co-writer)
- The Container (Summerworks)
- The Post Office (Pleiades Theatre)
- Tideline (Factory Theatre)
- Bhopal (Cahoots Theatre)
- Indian Ink (CanStage / National Arts Centre).

=== Writer ===
Theatre

Film and television

As scriptwriter he worked on animated shorts, Talespinners Collection 1, Talespinners Collection 2 (NFB); Short film, Tongue Tied; TV series The Blobheads (YTV, 1 episode); IMAX documentary Lost Worlds: Life in the Balance; TV series Blue Murder (Global TV, 2 episodes); TV series Groundling Marsh (YTV, 1 episode); TV series On My Mind (TVOntario, 1 episode); Short film Mela's Lunch (NFB); Short film Kumar and Mr. Jones (Canadian Film Centre); TV series Mount Royal (CTV, 1 episode); TV movie Best of Both Worlds (CBC); TV series Fraggle Rock (Jim Henson Company) (10 episodes); TV series The Phoenix Team (CBC, 1 episode); radio drama In the Mountains (CBC Radio) based on Rohinton Mistry's novel A Fine Balance; radio drama Entry Denied (CBC Radio) which was Canada's entry in the Worldplay Festival and broadcast worldwide.

Awards

== Filmography ==
=== Film ===
Year	Title	Role	Notes	Ref.
1987	Blindside	Two Tone		
2000	Mission to Mars	2nd Capcom		
2009	Orphan	ICU Doctor		
2016	Remember	Hotel Clerk		
2018	The Joke Thief	Jerry the Uber Driver		
2018	Red Rover	Gopi		
2019	Guest of Honor	Indian Restaurant Manager		
2022	Ashgrove	Frank		
2022	Mistletoe Time Machine	Peter		
2022	A Gingerbread Christmas	Ted		
2023	Flipping for Christmas	Mayor Kumar		
2024	Super Icyclone	Monty		

=== Television ===
Sugith Varughese television credits
Year	Title	Role	Notes	Ref.
1983	Best of Both Worlds	Anil	TV movie	
1984	Overdrawn at the Memory Bank	Transcorp Reporter	TV movie	
1992	Counterstrike	Terrorist	Episode: "Prize Package"	
1992	Quiet Killer	Sara's Doorman	TV movie	
1993	Kung Fu: The Legend Continues	Mr. Cyril	1 episode	
1996	F/X: The Series	Director	1 episode	
1996	Toe Tags	Dr. Kilami, the Coroner	TV movie	
1997	PSI Factor: Chronicles of the Paranormal	Ian Vethamany	1 episode	
1997	Too Close to Home	Henry Sing	TV movie	
1997	Major Crime	Jimmy Chaddha	TV movie	
1997	Earth: Final Conflict	Dr. Basi (uncredited)	Episode: "Scorpions Dream"	
1998	Naked City: Justice with a Bullet	Prabadth	TV movie	
1998	A Father for Brittany	Doctor	TV movie	
1998	Defenders: Taking the First	Dr Caster	TV movie	
1999	Freak City	Dr. Rashdi	TV movie	
1999	Lethal Vows	Dr. Singh	TV movie	
2001	Criminal Instinct: A Colder Kind of Death	Paul Gupta	TV movie	
2002	Get a Clue	Homeless Man / Gary Eicar	TV movie	
2002–2003	An American in Canada	Aftab	6 episodes. AKA Frostbite (Australia)	
2003	Veritas: The Quest	Auctioneer	1 episode	
2003, 2004	Degrassi: The Next Generation	Dr. Moragoda	2 episodes	
2004	72 Hours: True Crime	Informant	Episode: "Burning Obsession"	
2004–2005	Metropia	Palash		
2005	Kevin Hill	Judge Ames Stewart	1 episode	
2006	Solar Attack	Patel	TV movie	
2007	The Gathering	Male Internist	TV miniseries	
2007–2011	Little Mosque on the Prairie	Faisal	19 episodes	
2015	The Strain	Naren Gupta	4 episodes	
2016	The Girlfriend Experience	Tariq Barr	7 episodes (Season 1)	
2016, 2018	Suits	Judge Howard	2 episodes	
2016–2021	Kim's Convenience	Mr. Mehta	25 episodes	
2018	Taken	Edwin Brown	1 episode	
2018	Imposters	Dr. Robert John	1 episode	
2020–2024	Transplant	Aajay Singh	29 episodes	
2021	The Expanse	David Paster	3 episodes	
2022	Scentsational Christmas	Jamar	TV movie	
2025	Law & Order Toronto: Criminal Intent	Lewis Jenkins	1 episode	
2025	Late Bloomer	Richard Matthias	1 episode	
