= Solar Attack =

2006 American television film

- DVD cover of Solar Attack (widescreen)
- Written by: Michael Konyves; Miguel Tejada-Flores
- Screenplay by: Jason Derdamov
- Directed by: Paul Ziller
- Starring: Mark Dacascos; Joanne Kelly; Louis Gossett Jr.
- Music by: Chuck Cirino
- Country of origin: Canada
- Original language: English

Production
- Executive producers: Josée Bernard; Tom Berry; Neil Bregman; Lisa Hansen; Richard Schlesinger
- Producers: Stefan Wodoslawsky; Gordon Yang
- Cinematography: Robert Saad; Kit Whitmore
- Editor: Robert E. Newton
- Running time: 91 minutes
- Production companies: CineTel Films; Corus Entertainment; Outrage Productions 5, S.V. Scary Films 3

Original release
- Release: May 25, 2006

Solar Attack (also called Solar Strike) is a 2006 television film by CineTel Films and Lions Gate Entertainment, starring Mark Dacascos, Joanne Kelly and Louis Gossett Jr.

Solar Attack concerns large coronal mass ejections (CMEs) that cause the Earth's atmosphere to burn, potentially suffocating all life on Earth. All of this happens during a time of political tension between the United States and Russia. Disaster is eventually averted by the detonation of nuclear missiles at the poles, releasing vapor that extinguishes the burning methane caused by the CMEs.

== Plot ==
While a solar probe operated by the fictional Solar and Near Earth Laboratory (SNEL) is obtaining data, a large CME or solar flare destroys the probe. A crewed spacecraft, Galileo, is caught in the CME and destroyed; the tragedy is blamed on defective Russian equipment. CMEs knock satellites out of orbit, turning them into deadly meteors, and a CME hits New Zealand, destroying it and turning it into a huge mass of molten rock.

After a multi-millionaire, Lucas Foster (Mark Dacascos), funds a program to fight global warming, it is discovered that the Earth's atmosphere is now 5 percent methane. Multiple CMEs are bound to hit the Earth, ignite the methane, and suffocate every living thing on Earth. Foster, who is also a scientist, tries to convince his skeptical colleagues. The government officials and fellow scientist Joanna Parks (Joanne Kelly), his ex-wife, do not believe Foster either.

As the CMEs strike, it is determined that 25-megaton nuclear missiles fired at the North Pole will release vapor that will extinguish the methane flares. Fortunately, Foster knows a Russian Navy submarine captain who reluctantly lets him board his submarine. Foster explains that although satellite communication has been disabled, the submarine can communicate via a transatlantic telegraph cable located at a depth of 800 m. The sub is designed to dive to 700m, but the captain tells his reluctant lieutenant to dive to 800 m nevertheless. The submarine survives the dive with minor damage. Communication between the captain and the Russian President results in the latter, who has been informed of the situation by U.S. President Ryan Gordon (Louis Gossett Jr.), telling the captain to go ahead with the plan.

Meanwhile, the Russian submarine has detected a U.S. Navy submarine. Before the Russian missiles can be launched, a lieutenant threatens the captain at gunpoint, but Foster wrestles the gun away. The Russian submarine is detected by the Americans, who threaten to attack if it does not surrender. The Russian captain launches the missiles anyway, and the American submarine fires four torpedoes. The Russian submarine releases countermeasures that destroy the torpedoes, but it still suffers damage. Foster manages to contact the American sub over short-wave radio and convince them to stand down in exchange for the Russians surrender, though Foster states that the surrender is a simple formality. The missiles arrive at the North Pole and the Earth is saved. Foster is returned to the US aboard an American naval vessel where he reunites with Joanna and his friend Jim.

== Cast ==
- Mark Dacascos as Lucas Foster
- Joanne Kelly as Joanna Parks
- Kevin Jubinville as Brad Stamp
- Sugith Varughese as Patel
- Craig Eldridge as Jim Leeburg
- Tim Post as Joe Aguilar
- Stephen McHattie as Admiral Lawrence
- Conrad Coates as Colonel Alby
- Louis Gossett Jr. as President Ryan Gordon
- Damir Andrei as President Yuri Ilyushin
- Bill Lake as Captain Mikhail Gregorovitch
- Genādijs Dolganovs as Lt. Troiska
- Romas Stanulis as Russian Crew Member
- Ronn Sarosiak as Commander Wade
- Duane Murray as Lt. Copeland
- Jason Knight as Delta Pilot
- Bill Hall as Reporter
- Gordon Masten as Hot Dog Man
- Neil Crone as Security Guard

== Production ==
Solar Attack under its original working title, Solar Strike, was shot in Hamilton, Ontario and Toronto, Ontario, Canada. HMCS Haida is seen in the last scene of the film, standing in for a U.S. Navy destroyer.

== See also ==
- Solar Crisis
- Sunshine
