= Malayali Australians =

Total population
- 78,738 (2021)

Regions with significant populations
- State / Territory
- Victoria: 25,342
- New South Wales: 20,890
- Queensland: 13,003
- Western Australia: 9,697
- South Australia: 4,809
- Australian Capital Territory: 2,766
- Northern Territory: 1,601
- Tasmania: 615

Languages
- English, Malayalam

Religion
- Christianity, Hinduism, Islam

Related ethnic groups
- Indo-Australians

Malayali Australians (Malayalee Australian) are Australians whose ancestors, or themselves, identify as ethnic Malayalis (also called Keralites) and speak Malayalam. Malayali Australians constitute one group of Indian Australians. Malayalis originate from the South Indian state of Kerala, and are one of the fastest-growing populations in Australia with 78,738 speakers as per the 2021 census. Most of this population had arrived in Australia after the year 2007.

Malayalis have indeed been a part of Australia for decades.Most of this population is in the 25-39 year age cohort (53%), and the estimated average age of this population is approximately 32 years. Both genders are well represented, with more males (52%) than females (48%). A vast majority of this population over the age of 15 are married (71%), followed by people who have never married (11%). The population is well represented across different income groups, and the estimated average individual income is $45,000 per annum. Almost a quarter of this population indicated that they are Australian citizens.The 1980s-1990s saw a skilled migration boom. Malayalis entered healthcare, engineering, IT, and academia. Malayalis mostly came as skilled, family-unit migrants.

== Notable Malayali Australians ==
- Smitha Antony, violinist
- Jinson Charls, politician and Northern Territory minister
- Lisa Haydon, Model, Actress, TV Presenter
- Sajeev Koshy, endodontist
- Tania Luiz, badminton player
- Arjun Nair, first class cricketer
- Chandrika Ravi, actress
- Maria Thattil, media personality, HR manager, podcaster, author, actress, crowned Miss Universe Australia 2020 and then represented Australia at Miss Universe 2020, where she was placed in the top 10.
- Mathai Varghese, pure mathematician
- Peter Varghese, public servant
- Dr.Sadanandan Nambiar AO, Forest scientist born in Azhikode, Kerala. Awarded Officer of the Order of Australia (AO) in 2014 for distinguished service to science and sustainable forest management.

== See also ==
- Indian Australians
- Malayali people
