= Vijay Menon (writer) =

American writer and fintech entrepreneur

- Born: 1990s Bay Area of California
- Education: Duke University
- Occupations: Writer, entrepreneur
- Known for: Founder and CEO of Butter Payments
- Notable work: A Brown Man in Russia: Lessons Learned on the Trans-Siberian

Vijay Menon (born 1990s) is an American writer and financial technology entrepreneur. He is the author of the travel memoir A Brown Man in Russia: Lessons Learned on the Trans-Siberian (2018) and the founder and CEO of Butter Payments, a startup that uses machine learning to reduce revenue loss from failed subscription transactions. He was also named to Forbes 30 Under 30 (Enterprise Technology) in 2023.

== Early life and education ==
Menon was born in the Bay Area of California. He graduated from Duke University with degrees in Statistics and Economics, where he was also a Duke Debate Champion.

== Career ==
After university, Menon worked in data roles at Microsoft, Dropbox and Scribd. In 2020, he raised a pre-seed round from Atomic venture studio to found Butter Payments. This San Francisco-based fintech company helps subscription-based businesses recover revenue lost due to unintentional payment failures, often referred to as "accidental" churn.

Butter raised a $9 million Series A in late 2022. In January 2023, the company raised $21,5 million in Series A funding led by Norwest Venture Partners, with participation from Atomic. In May 2024, the company secured an additional $10 million at a valuation of about $135 million, according to Axios Pro. Butter has been included in workplace and startup rankings in 2025.

== A Brown Man in Russia ==
Menon’s memoir, A Brown Man in Russia: Lessons Learned on the Trans-Siberian, was published in 2018 by Glagoslav Publications. The book recounts Menon’s two-week winter journey across Russia and Mongolia with two college friends, traveling by third-class carriage on the Trans-Siberian Railway and visiting Moscow, St. Petersburg, Tyumen, Irkutsk, and Ulaanbaatar. Each of the twenty-two chapters is followed by a short "lesson" section offering reflections on cross-cultural encounters and identity.

=== Reception ===
Reviewers have noted the book’s exploration of race, cultural perception, and globalisation. A review by Jinyi Chu of Stanford University in the Slavic and East European Journal found some of its "lessons" superficial but acknowledged its relevance to contemporary travel writing. Chu described it as "an attempt at finding a space for travel writing in today’s globalised world", observing that while Menon’s tone is informal, his narrative raises questions about identity and cross-cultural understanding.

World Literature Today described the memoir as a personable travelogue that combines anecdotes with philosophical reflections. An interview feature in The Moscow Times highlighted the book’s appeal for readers reassessing their "own Russian experience".

According to Yelena Furman of UCLA, the book stands out for presenting Russia through the eyes of a brown American traveller — a rarely represented perspective in travel writing. Furman noted Menon’s humorous and self-deprecating style, his reflections on belonging and race in both Russia and the United States, and his portrayal of ordinary Russians as curious and generous rather than hostile.

== See also ==
- List of Duke University people
- List of American novelists
- List of Indian Americans
- List of people from California
