= Appachan =

Appachan is a Malayalam word meaning "father" or "grandfather." It can also be used to refer to an elderly man of no relation to the speaker.

The term originates among the Syrian Christian community in Kerala but is used among other Christian communities in Kerala as well.

Appachan may also refer to:

- Navodaya Appachan (a.k.a. Maliampurackal Chacko Punnoose, 1925–2012), Indian film producer, director and entrepreneur
- Swargachitra Appachan (a.k.a. Pinakkatt D. Abraham, active from 1987), Indian film producer and entrepreneur
