= Arun Venugopal =

American journalist

Arun Venugopal is an American journalist. He covers news regarding race, immigration, gender, and identity in the United States. He is currently Senior Reporter in the Race & Justice Unit at WNYC, New York Public Radio, where he has worked since 2005 and where he created and the hosted the program called "Micropolis", which features aspects of New York City's ethnically diverse communities. Among the topics he has addressed is the idea of Asian-Americans as the "model minority" and how its discourses can perpetuate diverse patterns of racism towards nonwhite groups, as well as xenophobia towards immigrants. Venugopal also writes for Gothamist.

== Family, education, and career ==
Arun Venugopal grew up in Piney Point, a suburb of Houston, Texas, as the son of parents who immigrated from Kerala, India. He has reflected on these experiences while critiquing ideas of Indian-American, and more broadly Asian-American, exceptionalism in the United States, and on the circumstances by which "the U.S. engineered the conditions that allowed certain nonwhite groups to thrive". In 2017 he collected narratives of white working-class Americans who voted for Donald J. Trump for U.S. president, in order to understand their motives and concerns. In his reporting he has also examined the political and cultural consciousness of the South Asian diaspora in the United States.

He received a Master of Arts in Media Studies from The New School. He has contributed to radio, print journalism, and digital journalism reporting in venues including National Public Radio (NPR) in its "Morning Edition" and "All Things Considered" programs, Slate, PBS Newshour, The Guardian, The Wall Street Journal, The New York Times, Salon, The New York Post, the Associated Press, and more.

In 2010, Venugopal created WNYC New York Public Radio's program called Micropolis, which aims to feature New York City's ethnically diverse communities while making "big, anonymous city just a little bit more knowable." Past episodes have featured topics ranging from Black protest music and the New York roots of Trumpist Islamophobia, to Christmas festivities among non-Christians, Jewish Talmudic study conferences, and the Tibetan community of Jackson Heights. Following the onset of the COVID-19 pandemic, an episode in 2020 considered the challenges facing New York City's restaurant, bar, and food vendor scene and discussed how residents could support these businesses amid closures.

== See also ==
- Indians in the New York City metropolitan area
- New Yorkers in journalism
