= St. Thomas Syro Malabar Church (Boston) =

Church in Framingham, Massachusetts

The Syro-Malabar Church of Boston is a congregation of the Syro-Malabar Catholic Church in Framingham, Massachusetts. Founded in 2004, it is under the jurisdiction of the St. Thomas Syro-Malabar Catholic Diocese of Chicago.

== History ==
Syro-Malabar Catholics in the Boston area began to meet informally in the early 1970s as a prayer group known as the Kerala Catholics of New England that gathered for cultural and liturgical activities in the Malayalam language. In 1995, twelve families gathered to discuss the situation of the Syro-Malabar Catholics.

April 11, 2003,Turning point in the history of church: Fr.Tomy Kariyilakulam and Fr.Raju Muringayil co-celebrated the Holy Qurbana at St. Charles Church in Waltham, MA. Fr.Tomy introduced Fr.Jose Kandathikkudy, the vicar of the St. Thomas Syro Malabar Church, Bronx, NY and encouraged the congregation to start having a regular Mass. Mr. Jose Puthanpurackal Sebastian was elected as the president.

August 15, 2003: Monthly service started with the celebration of Ascension of our Mother Mary and the Indian independence day. Fr. Jose Kandathikkudy, the vicar of the St. Thomas Syro Malabar Church, Bronx, NY, was the celebrant. Monthly services continued with the help of Fr. Jose Kandathikkudy and other visiting priests.

On June 12, 2004, His Excellency Mar Jacob Angadiath, bishop of the St. Thomas Syro-Malabar Catholic Diocese of Chicago, officially inaugurated the St. Thomas Syro-Malabar Church of Boston at a large gathering of faithful under the guidance of Rev. Fr. Varghese Perappadan. Fr. Pereppadan was appointed director of the mission, which met for services at the Fernald School chapel in Waltham, Massachusetts on a weekly basis. In July 2004, he stepped down as director. On September 18, 2004, Fr. Paul Pudussery was appointed as the second director of the mission.

On January 31, 2005, St. Thomas Syro Malabar Catholic Church of Boston was officially registered as a non-profit organization under the laws of the state of Massachusetts.

On March 22, 2006, Rev. Fr. Kuriakose Vadana was appointed by Mar Jacob Angadiath as the mission director. The treasurer of the church is Mr Biju Thoompil. The Church holds many cultural activities and is famous for Bible Month a whole month dedicated to bible study directed by Mr Anto Kurian.

In July 2008, the Roman Catholic Archdiocese of Boston offered St. Thomas Syro-Malabar Church the use of a former parish church in Framingham. After the closure of St. Jeremiah Church was announced in 2005, some of its parishioners began an occupation in protest, which they maintained until 2010. The Syro-Malabar Mission took up residence at St. Jeremiah Church in 2008. On October 1, 2011, the Roman Catholic Archdiocese of Boston announced that it had sold St. Jeremiah's Church for $2 million to the Syro Malabar diocese.

In 2011, the mission was promoted to the status of a Parish, and Rev. Fr. Varghese Naikoparambil was appointed by Mar Jacob Angadiath as the mission director.

In 2013, Rev. Fr. Mathew Pothalil, was appointed as parish priest for the church.

In 2015, Rev. Fr Raphael Ambadan became the priest of the parish.

In 2016, Fr. Tony Xavier, was appointed as parish priest for the church.

In 2021, Fr. Stephen Kanippallil MCBS, was appointed as parish priest for the church.

In 2024, Fr. Joby Joseph MCBS, was appointed as parish priest for the church.

In 2025, Rev. Fr. John Melepuram, was appointed as parish priest for the church.

In 2025, Fr. Dijo Thomas Koikkara, was appointed as parish priest for the church.
