= Smitha Antony =

Indian-born Australian violinist

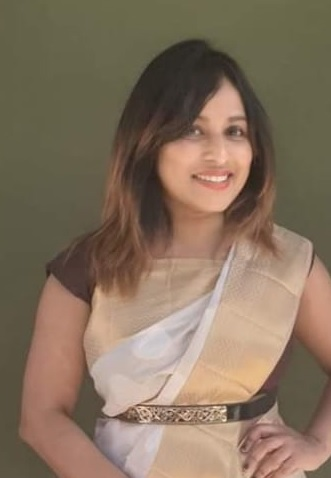
Smitha Antony

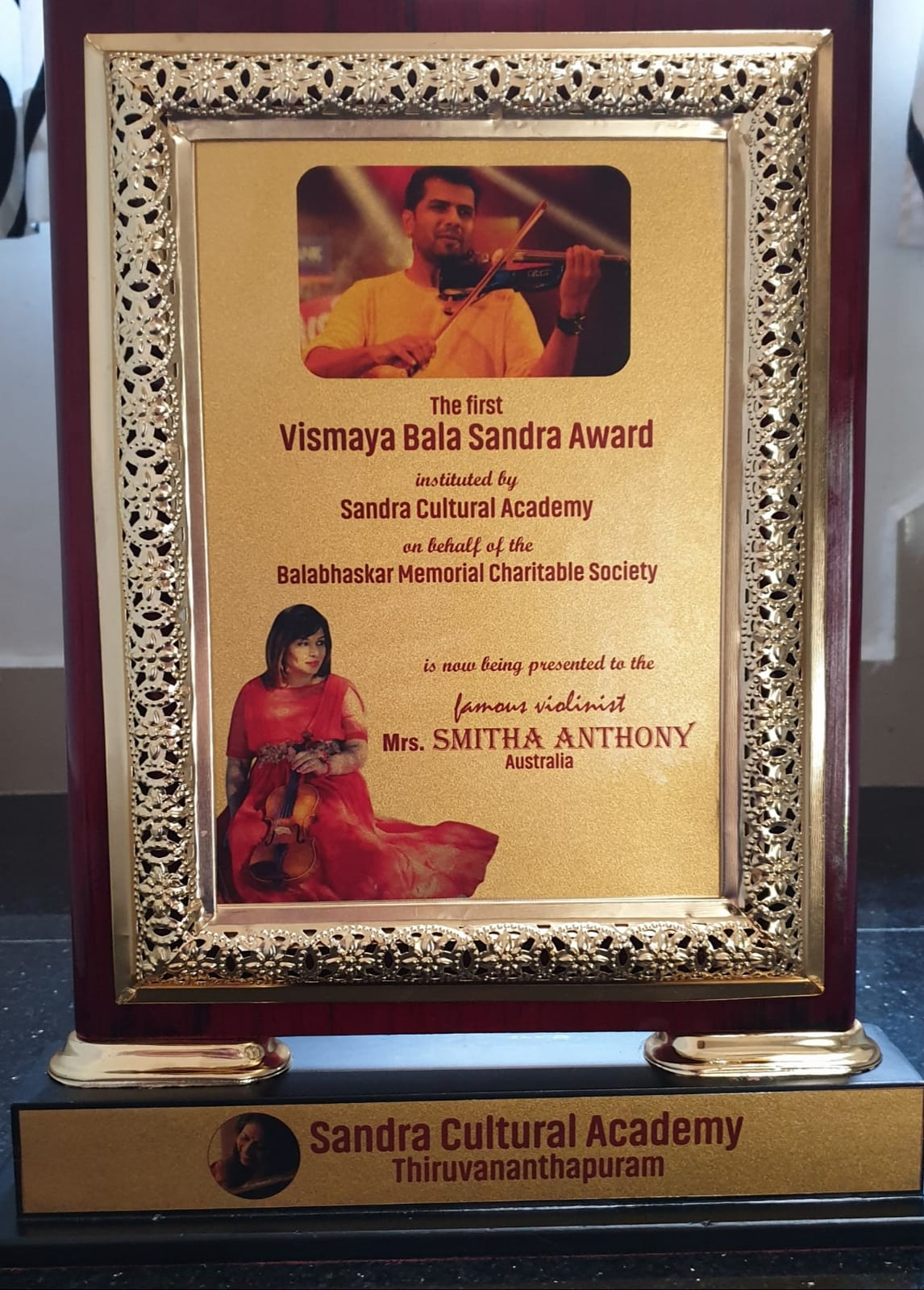
Award plaque

Smitha Antony is an Indian-born Australian violinist. She was the first recipient of the Vismaya Balasandra Award, an award constituted by the Sandra Cultural Academy in memory of the late violinist Balabhaskar Chandran, in 2019.

== Biography ==
Antony was raised in a family of music enthusiasts. Her father, MJ Antony, was the music teacher at St. Ignatius Loyola Boys High School in Trivandrum, Kerala, and her uncle MJ Michael was the founder of the Indian Youth Chamber Orchestra. Antony started playing the violin at the age of 7. She studied at St. Mary's High School, Trivandrum before graduating from Mar Ivanios College, Trivandrum.

Antony met Chandran at the Kerala University Youth Festival, where they were both participating in violin competitions: Antony in the Western classical violin category and Chandran in the Indian classical violin category. After Antony won her category, Chandran asked her to teach him Western violin; the following year, Chandran won the Western classical violin category at the festival.

After Chandran's death, Antony was inspired to create her own adaptation of the song Lag ja gale; this was the composition which won her the Vismaya Balasandra Award.

Antony migrated to Australia in 2000 and lives in Sydney. She composes her own music and continues to participate in various cultural programs.
