= Michael Kuruvilla =

Chief of Police of the Police Department of Brookfield, Illinois

- Born: 1983 (age 42–43); U.S.
- Education: University of Illinois Chicago (BSW, MSW)
- Spouse: Sibil Kuruvilla
- Children: 2
- Police career
- Allegiance: District of Illinois
- Department: Brookfield Police Department, Chicago, Illinois
- Service years: 2021-present
- Rank: Chief of Police

Michael Kuruvilla is an American chief of the police department of Brookfield, Illinois, since July 2021 and was deputy chief previously. He is noted for being one of the first South Asian police chiefs in the United States.

== Early and personal life ==
Michael Kuruvilla was born in the United States to Indian Malayali parents. His father worked as an accountant and is from Manganam, Kottayam city, in the Kottayam district of Kerala, while his mother, a pharmacist, is from Kollakadavu in Alappuzha district. Both of his parents came to the US as adults, studied in American universities and got married there. He said, "My father came to the US as an adult, as three of his siblings and their respective families were already here, therefore providing a means and way to immigrate to the United States. ... My mother also came to the US as an adult, right out of high school, as her mother had immigrated to the US as a nurse, and then brought the rest of the family here along with her." He traveled to Kerala every four or five years as a child.

Kuruvilla graduated from University of Illinois Chicago and earned a Bachelor of Social Work and a Master of Social Work.

He is married to Sibil, who is from Mattakkara in Kottayam district. They have two sons.

== Career ==
Soon after completing his master's degree in 2006, Kuruvilla got hired by the Brookfield Police in Brookfield, Illinois the same year, making him the first Indian-American to do so, and worked as a civilian crisis worker with the Brookfield Police Department before becoming a police officer. He stated that coming from an immigrant family, "police work was not something on the radar as an option growing up" as he didn't know anyone in law enforcement. He further stated that he considers his educational background an "invaluable asset" to law enforcement. He said, "But seeing where law enforcement and the Brookfield Police Department are headed, I quickly found that my passion for the work has grown over the years." He later became a deputy chief.

In September 2020, Kuruvilla, then aged 37, was awarded a "40 Under 40" award by the International Association of Chiefs of Police.

On July 12, 2021, Kuruvilla took over the post of chief of police of the Brookfield Police Department, making him the first Indian American, first Malayali, and the first person of South Asian descent to hold the post. Edward Petrak, the acting Police Chief, recommended Kuruvilla to Timothy Wiberg, the Brookfield Village Manager, who approved Kuruvilla's candidature for the post, and stated that "fifteen years is plenty of experience to run a department. He’s been successful at every level. He's ready for it."
