= The Tennis Partner =

1999 novel by Abraham Verghese

The Tennis Partner

The Tennis Partner is the second of Abraham Verghese's books. Published in 1999, when he was a physician practicing internal medicine in El Paso, Texas, this is an autobiographical memoir, and Abraham Verghese writes of his experience moving to El Paso in the midst of an unraveling marriage. Once there, he meets and eventually becomes a mentor to David Smith, a medical resident at the hospital where Verghese worked and a brilliant tennis player recovering from drug addiction.

Because of his own love for the game and as part of his effort to reach out to the troubled resident, Verghese begins to play singles tennis regularly during their free time outside the hospital. What starts as a casual game between the two men eventually develops into a complex ritual that allows them to develop a deep friendship and understanding of the pressures they each face. In the hospital, Verghese is the teacher and Smith the student. On the court, however, Smith, the one-time professional player, becomes the teacher. The story tells of their all too brief friendship as Smith battles and eventually succumbs to his disease, and Verghese's helpless attempts to intervene.

While cited as fiction, The Tennis Partner is heavily autobiographical. In 2019, it was ranked by Slate as one of the 50 greatest nonfiction books of the past 25 years.
