= My Own Country =

1994 book by Abraham Verghese

My Own Country

My Own Country: A Doctor's Story is a 1994 book by American doctor and author Abraham Verghese. The book is non-fiction, based on Verghese's own experiences in dealing with AIDS patients in East Tennessee in the early stages of the epidemic. A film adaptation commissioned by Showtime and directed by Mira Nair, starring Naveen Andrews as Verghese, aired on the network in 1998.

== Synopsis ==
My Own Country traces the story of a young infectious-disease physician in the mid-1980s in Johnson City, Tennessee, who began to treat patients with a then unknown disease, which turned out to be AIDS. Dr. Verghese became, of necessity, the town's AIDS expert. He gave his patients caring and empathetic treatment, and gained back understanding. He was frequently the only person at the bedside of his patients, when family and friends were fearful or in denial about the disease.

== Publication ==
My Own Country: A Doctor's Story, is Verghese's first book.

== Reception and impact ==
First published in 1994, My Own Country made that year's New York Times Notable Book list.

My Own Country is used in colleges and medical schools throughout North America and across the world because of the way it communicates the sense of empathy and compassion so often missing in medical school education in an era of high technology and reliance on computers as primary diagnostic tools.

== Adaptations ==
Actor Naveen Andrews portrayed Verghese in a 1998 made-for-TV adaptation, directed by Mira Nair and airing on Showtime.
