= Rajan Devadas =

Indian American photojournalist and Gandhian

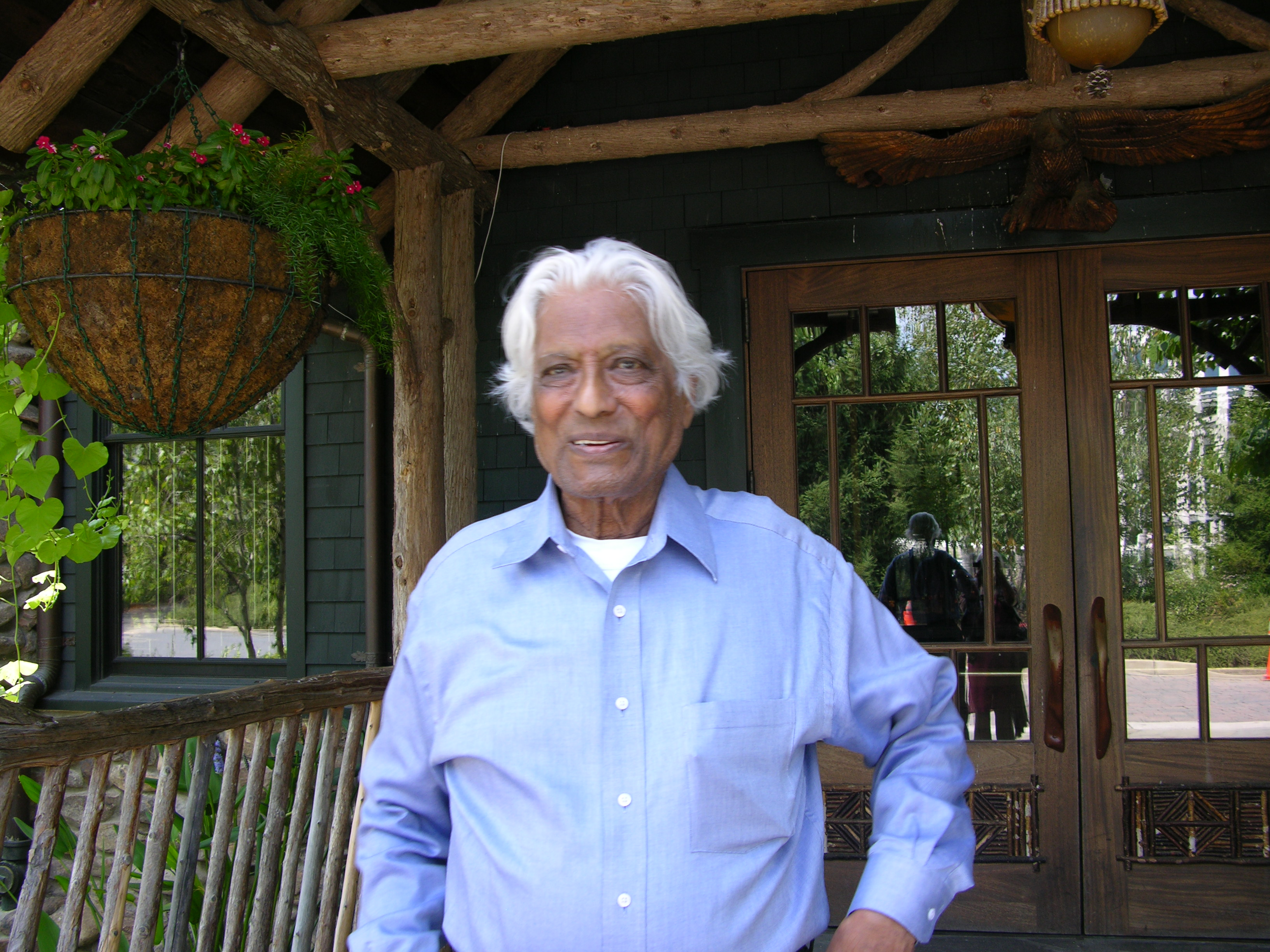
- Born: 1921; Thiruvananthapuram, Kerala, India
- Died: 26 December 2014 (aged 92–93); Rockville, Maryland, USA
- Occupation: Photojournalist
- Known for: Documenting India-US relations
- Spouse: Kimiko
- Children: Eight children
- Awards: Padma Shri

Rajan Devadas (1921-2014) was an Indian American photojournalist and Gandhian, known for his visual coverage of India–United States relations for over 50 years. He was the first accredited White House photographer of Indian origin. Devadas was honored by the Government of India, in 2002, with the fourth highest Indian civilian award of Padma Shri.

== Biography ==
Rajan Devadas was born in 1921 in Thiruvananthapuram, in the southern part of the Indian. The death of his father made him shift to Calcutta (now Kolkata) and then to the temple town of Varanasi in Uttar Pradesh where he grew up. He studied at the Banares Hindu University, and after graduating from there, he joined the university as an administrative assistant. He was a member of the Indian National Congress and was known to have participated in the Indian freedom movement. Later, with the help of a few of his friends, he secured a scholarship in 1954 to study at the Pendle Hill Quaker Center for Study and Contemplation for a one-year course. Towards the end of the year, he boarded a ship to US and reached New York in January 1955.

After completing the Pendle Hill Quaker course, Devadas joined the University of Pennsylvania for two semesters and later at the Temple University for further studies. This was followed by two courses at the New School for Social Research, New York, one journalism and the other in public relations. During his time at the institute, he developed a fascination for photography and, on completion of the courses, joined the Indian Embassy in Washington as the official photographer.

Devadas covered most of the major functions related to India–United States relations during his service with the Indian Embassy which included all the visits by Indian Prime Ministers to US from Jawaharlal Nehru to Manmohan Singh. He was reported to have photographed all the US Presidents from John F. Kennedy to George W. Bush. He also photographed many world leaders such as Margaret Thatcher, Sheikh Mujibur Rahman, Pope John Paul, Dalai Lama, Mother Teresa and J. R. Jayewardene. Many leading media houses such as India Abroad, Economic Times, India Today, Press Trust of India, Times of India, Illustrated Weekly of India, The Hindu, Hindustan Times, New York Times, Washington Post, UPI, Reuters and Al Ahram have published photos taken by Devadas. An exhibition of his photos was organized at the Capital Children's Museum in Washington in 1989.

Devadas died at age 93, on 26 December 2014, succumbing to a cardiac arrest at his home at Hebrew Home of Greater Washington in Rockville, Maryland. He left behind his wife, Kimiko, two daughters, Kamal Cohen and Mina Devadas and six sons, Thambi, Anand, Asoka, Shyam, Arjun and Prem.

He was awarded the civilian honour of Padma Shri by the Government of India in 2002. The civil investiture ceremony was held in Chicago as he was unable to travel to India due to failing health.
