= Cutting for Stone =

2009 novel by Abraham Verghese

- Author: Abraham Verghese
- Cover artist: John Gall
- Language: English
- Publisher: Alfred A. Knopf
- Publication date: February 2009
- Publication place: United States
- Pages: 658 pp
- ISBN: 978-0-375-71436-8
- LC Class: PS3622 E744 C87 2009

Cutting for Stone (2009) is a novel written by Ethiopian-born Indian-American medical doctor and author Abraham Verghese. It is a saga of twin brothers, orphaned by their mother's death at their births and forsaken by their father. The book includes both a deep description of medical procedures and an exploration of the human side of medical practices.

When first published, the novel was on The New York Times Best Seller list for two years and generally received well by critics. With its positive reception, former United States president Barack Obama put it on his summer reading list and the book was optioned for adaptations.

== Plot summary ==
The story is told by the protagonist, Marion Stone. He and his conjoined twin Shiva are born at Mission Hospital (called "Missing" in accordance with the local pronunciation), Addis Ababa, in September 1954. Their mother, Sister Mary Joseph Praise, an Indian Carmelite nun, dies during childbirth. Their father, Thomas Stone, the English surgeon of Missing, abandons them and disappears. Orphaned at birth, the pair grow up in the household of two physicians of Missing, both from Madras, the obstetrician Kalpana Hemlatha (Hema) and Abhi Ghosh, who fall in love while caring for the infants. Hema names them Marion (after J. Marion Sims) and Shiva (after the Hindu deity). Ghosh teaches himself surgery to replace Stone. The tissue link between the twins has been separated at birth and the two grow up together being very close initially.

Both twins are exposed to the changing political environment in Ethiopia. There is an unsuccessful rebellion by Haile Selassie's bodyguard, General Mebratu. Ghosh is imprisoned, then released, in the aftermath of the coup, due to his friendship with Mebratu. Through their parents, both boys are exposed to medical knowledge and taught medical procedures at the hospital.

Over time, though, individual differences begin to become pronounced. When entering puberty their relationship to Genet, the daughter of Rosina, a domestic help, finally tears them apart. Marion is in love with Genet and intends to marry her, but it is Shiva who, interested in sexual pursuits, becomes her first lover. Marion feels betrayed. Rosina forces Genet to submit to female genital mutilation, and Rosina commits suicide shortly thereafter. Genet later joins the Eritrean liberation movement. While Marion goes to medical school, his brother stays at Missing. Focused on the repair of birth-related fistulas, he takes up his surgical training with Hema, eschewing a formal medical education. On his deathbed, Ghosh has three wishes for Marion – to get the best medical education, to find Stone, and to forgive his brother.

When Genet and her comrades hijack an Ethiopian Airlines airplane in 1979, Marion's name is found in a list of her connections. To avoid arrest, he flees the country overnight to Kenya. He goes to New York City where he finds a position at Our Lady of Perpetual Succour, a hospital in the Bronx. There, he enters a surgical residency. One day, while assisting his senior in a complicated trauma operation, an unknown surgeon enters and looks over their shoulders. It is Thomas Stone, by now a renowned liver surgeon from Boston. Marion's encounter with his biological father redirects his life, leading to a painful reconciliation and reunion with his estranged brother.

== Medical topics ==
The book contains descriptions of many medical diseases and interventions. The title relates to the oath of Hippocrates that calls his acolytes not to cut for (bladder) stones. Marion's mother dies during a complicated delivery (conjoined twins) from a uterine rupture. The babies are born premature. Shiva becomes an expert in the repair of vesico-vaginal and recto-vaginal fistulas. A vasectomy is described in detail "so charming and surgically precise, it could serve, in a pinch, as a how-to-manual."

The surgery of an intestinal volvulus establishes a relationship between Ghosh and Mebratu, but leads to his later imprisonment. Ghosh later dies from leukemia possibly related to his handling of outdated x-ray equipment. Genet undergoes female genital mutilation (female circumcision) and suffers from its complications. The book describes conditions in a tuberculosis sanatorium where Stone's mother dies from a ruptured aneurysm, the underlying condition acquired from her husband who has syphilis, or more specifically, tabes dorsalis. Marion's participation in the setting of an atriocaval shunt (a "Shrock") during trauma surgery in New York sets the scene when he encounters his biological father. The reader is further confronted with typhoid fever and hepatitis with liver failure. Other topics covered are depression, appendicitis, amputation, rickets, intestinal cancer, phlebitis, and intracranial hemorrhage.

== Reception ==
By February 2012 the book had been on the bestseller list of The New York Times for more than two years, and over one million copies had been sold. Paula Bock praises the book finding the epic "absorbing, exhilarating, and exhausting." Aida Edemariam notes that Verghese "interweaves (the characters') story with that of Ethiopia's past half century" and likes "the variety and colour of Verghese's world, its earthiness and drama, its concreteness and unselfconscious swing." She criticizes "a certain brutality ... in the gender politics" of the novel and that in real life things do not work out so neatly as narrated. Erica Wagner gives a mixed review finding "the novel to be capacious, not to say baggy" and "tinged, albeit lightly, with a sense of magic". While she admires the vivid descriptions of surgery, she suggests that the medical details sometimes interfere with the flow of the story. She criticizes that Verghese attempts "to cram in every last fact about (his characters)." However, John Irving wrote that "I've not read a novel wherein medicine, the practice of it, is made as germane to the storytelling process, to the overall narrative, as the author manages to make it happen here."

In 2011, President Barack Obama said he had chosen Cutting for Stone as one of the five books on his summer vacation reading list.

In February 2012 it was announced that Susanne Bier has signed on to direct a movie version of Cutting for Stone. Scott Teems will write the screen adaption.

== Listings and awards ==
- Amazon's Best Books of the Year: 2009 (#16)
- Publishers Weekly's Best Books: 2009 (Fiction)
- Indies Choice Book Award (Adult Fiction, 2010)
- Wellcome Trust Book Prize shortlist (2009)
- International Dublin Literary Award Longlist (2011)
- New York Times bestseller
