= Paul Varghese =

American comedian (b. 1977)

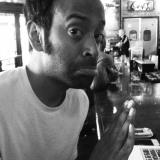
- Varghese sitting at diner
- Born: January 4, 1977 (age 49); Dallas, Texas, USA

Comedy career
- Years active: 2001–present
- Medium: Stand-up, television, radio

Paul Varghese (born January 4, 1977, in Dallas, Texas) is an American comedian and actor of Indian descent who appeared on the hit reality show Last Comic Standing 2, where he made it to the semi-finals. He taped his first full set for national television on March 8, 2007, for Comedy Central's Live at Gotham which aired July 13, 2007. He was a regular on the Pugs and Kelly radio show, noon-3 p.m. weekdays on Live 105.3/Free FM in Dallas when that radio station and show was still on the air.

== Family and early life ==
Varghese is Indian American, the son of Malayali immigrant parents from Kerala, and grew up in Garland, Texas, a suburb of Dallas. He earned a bachelor's degree in radio, television and film from the University of North Texas in 2000. He spent his junior year of college at William Paterson University of New Jersey, during which he interned on Sally Jessy Raphael's talk show.

His sister is the Episcopal priest Winnie Varghese, Dean of the Cathedral of St. John the Divine in New York City.

== Comedy career ==
Varghese, who began doing stand-up in 2001, opened for Canadian-born comedian Russell Peters in a short theater tour through Los Angeles, San Francisco, Boston and New York in 2005. That led to his headlining a 16-city Gurus of Comedy tour in the spring of 2006. In 2007 he was named "Best Stand-Up Comic in Dallas" by the Dallas Observer and won the 2009 "Funniest Comic in Texas" competition. Varghese was also featured on Showtime's "Russell Peter's Presents", Telemundo 2's "Loco Comedy Jam", Comedy Central's "Live at Gotham" and "Gabriel Iglesias Presents Stand-Up Revolution". On June 18, 2012, Varghese was given the opportunity to open for comedian Dave Chappelle at the Dallas House of Blues and the following night in Austin at the Paramount Theatre. On May 31, 2014, Varghese opened for Joan Rivers at IP Casino Resort in Biloxi, Mississippi. This was followed by several more openings for Ms. Rivers in June 2014.

== External ==
- official website
- Myspace page
- Review and biopic
- Interview
- Dallas news article
- Mentions an upcoming series on the International channel
- Google video of routine
- Ego Magazine article: The Gurus of Comedy
