= Abraham Verghese =

American physician, author, professor (born 1955)

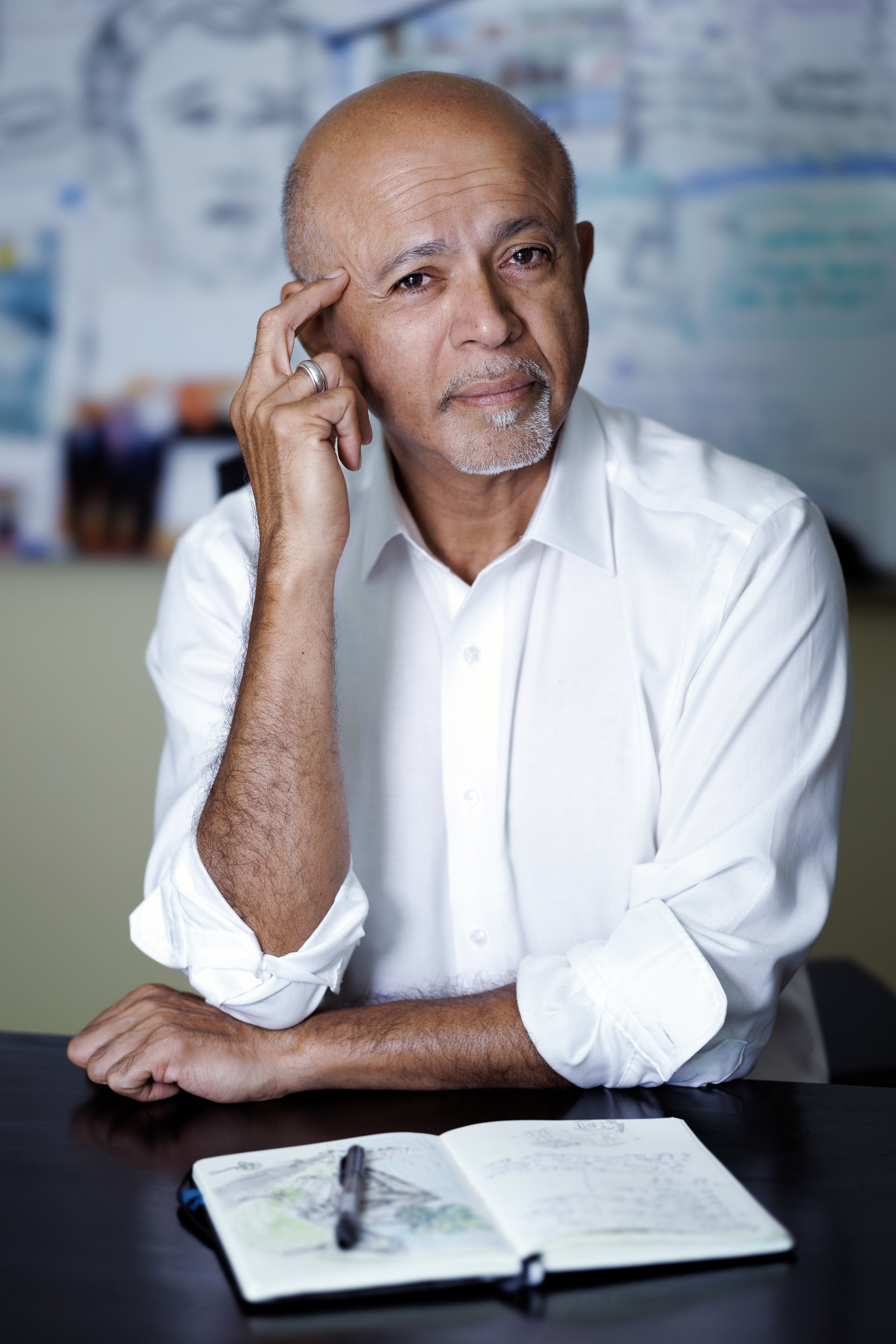
- Verghese in 2023
- Born: May 30, 1955 (age 71); Addis Ababa, Ethiopia
- Education: Madras Medical College
- Occupations: Professor of medicine, author
- Writing career
- Period: 1980 to present
- Genres: Medical, autobiography, fiction
- Notable works: My Own Country, The Tennis Partner, Cutting for Stone, The Covenant of Water
- Website: www.abrahamverghese.org

Abraham Verghese (born May 30, 1955) is an American physician and author. He is the Linda R. Meier and Joan F. Lane Provostial Professor of Medicine, Vice Chair for the Theory & Practice of Medicine, and Internal Medicine Clerkship Director at Stanford Medical School. He is also the author of four best-selling books: two memoirs and two novels. He is the co-host with Eric Topol of the Medscape podcast Medicine and the Machine.

In 2011, Verghese was elected a member of the Institute of Medicine. In 2014, he received the 19th Annual Heinz Award in the Arts and Humanities. President Barack Obama presented him with the National Humanities Medal in 2015. In 2023, Verghese was awarded a Guggenheim Fellowship. He has received seven honorary doctorate degrees.

== Background ==
Verghese was born on May 30, 1955, in Addis Ababa, Ethiopia, to Malayali Malankara Orthodox Christian parents from Kerala, India, who worked as teachers. As a child, Verghese was an avid reader, and it was reading that introduced him to the world of medicine.

He has three children: two sons from his first marriage and a third from his second marriage. His elder brother, George Verghese, is an engineering professor at MIT, and his younger brother, Phil Verghese, is a former software engineer at Google.

== Medical training and career ==
Verghese began his medical training in Ethiopia. In 1974, his education was interrupted by the civil unrest when emperor Haile Selassie was deposed and a Marxist military government took over. He left the country and joined his parents, who had emigrated to America. There, Verghese worked as a hospital orderly for a year. In his written work, he refers to that experience as deeply influential in confirming his desire to finish his medical training.

He went to India to complete his medical studies at Madras Medical College and was awarded an MBBS degree from the University of Madras in 1979, finishing an internship there.

Returning to the United States as a foreign medical graduate seeking an open residency position, he joined a new program in Johnson City, Tennessee, affiliated with East Tennessee State University.

After completing his residency in 1983, he took a fellowship at Boston University School of Medicine. He worked for two years at Boston City Hospital, where he encountered the early signs of the urban HIV epidemic. Returning to Johnson City in 1985 as assistant professor of medicine, he saw the first signs of a second epidemic, that of rural AIDS. Expecting to have one or two HIV patients a year, he soon had 100 in a small town. Although at the time he had no ambition to become a writer, he decided he wanted to tell the story of this tragedy, so he took a break from medicine to study writing.

In 1991, Verghese accepted a position as Professor of Medicine and Chief of the Division of Infectious Diseases at Texas Tech Health Sciences Center in El Paso, Texas. Despite his title, he was the sole infectious disease physician at Thomason Hospital. He was awarded the Grover E. Murray Distinguished Professorship of Medicine at the Texas Tech School of Medicine.

Eleven years later, Verghese became founding Director of The Center for Medical Humanities and Ethics at the University of Texas Health Science Center at San Antonio. At San Antonio, he held the Joaquin Cigarroa Chair and the Marvin Forland Distinguished Professorship.

After five years in San Antonio, he joined Stanford University School of Medicine in 2007 as a tenured professor for the Theory and Practice of Medicine and Associate Chair of Internal Medicine. He is a hospitalist for Stanford Medical Center and is the founder and director of the Presence program, which "champions the human experience in medicine."

== Training and career as a writer ==
Overwhelmed by the nature of his work with his AIDS patients in Tennessee, and with his first marriage under strain, Verghese joined the Iowa Writers Workshop at the University of Iowa. He cashed in his retirement plan and left his tenured position to move to Iowa City with his young family. In 1991, he completed a Master of Fine Arts. Later that year, The New Yorker magazine published his short story "Lilacs" about an AIDS patient who commits suicide.

In 1994, while teaching in El Paso, Verghese published his first book, My Own Country: A Doctor's Story, about his experiences in East Tennessee. In the book, he reflects on his work with the patients he cared for and gives his insights into his personal transformation from being "homoignorant", as he describes it. He also ponders themes of displacement, diaspora, responses to foreignness and the many individuals and families affected by the AIDS epidemic. This book was one of five chosen as "Best Book of the Year" by Time magazine, and in 1998 it was made into a television movie directed by Mira Nair.

Verghese's second memoir, The Tennis Partner: A Story of Friendship and Loss, was also written during his time in El Paso. It tells the story of his friend and tennis partner, a medical resident in recovery from drug addiction. The story deals with the ultimate death of Verghese's friend and explores the issue and prevalence of physician drug abuse. It also charts the breakdown of his first marriage, an integral part of the narrative in both My Own Country and The Tennis Partner. This book was reissued in 2009.

In 2009, Knopf published Verghese's first novel, Cutting for Stone. In 2010, Random House published the paperback version of the book, and it remained on The New York Times list for more than two years. Cutting for Stone describes a period of dramatic political change in Ethiopia, a time of great loss for the author, who, as an expatriate, had to leave the country of his birth. Cutting for Stone reached No. 1 on the Independent Booksellers list and was optioned as a movie.

Verghese's next novel, The Covenant of Water, was published in May 2023 by Grove Atlantic and was chosen for Oprah's Book Club. Inspired by the life of the author's mother, to whom the book is dedicated, the story is set between 1900 and the 1970s in Kerala, a coastal territory at the southern tip of India. The plot follows three generations of a family in which one or more people in each generation has mysteriously died from drowning. The book stayed on The New York Times bestseller list for 37 weeks. and was listed by the newspaper as one of its 100 Notable Books of 2023. In January 2024, Oprah announced that she had optioned the film rights.

== Bedside medicine ==
Verghese's early experience of working as a hospital orderly gave him a deep understanding of the patient's hospital situation with its varying levels of treatment and care. He has said the insights he gained from this work helped him to become a more empathic physician and resulted in the motto, "Imagining the Patient's Experience", that defined his later work.

His focus in San Antonio was developing medical humanities as a way to preserve doctors' innate empathy and sensitivity. He developed a formal humanities and ethics curriculum integrated into all four years of the medical school program. He also invited medical students to accompany him on bedside rounds as a way of demonstrating his conviction in the value of the physical examination in diagnosing patients and in developing a caring, two-way patient-doctor relationship that benefits not only patients and their families but also the physician.

At Stanford University he continues to explore the importance of patient-centered bedside medicine and the physical exam, both in techniques and in the importance of the ritual of the physician's presence at the bedside. "The Stanford 25" is an initiative developed to showcase and teach 25 fundamental physical exam skills and their diagnostic benefits to interns. In a 2023 interview, Verghese commented on how his writing skills help him pay more attention to patients' stories and ask more questions that can lead to better diagnoses. Verghese has also mentioned he is hard of hearing and uses hearing aids; he often reads his patients’ lips as well.

Verghese's emphasis on the physical examination has been dismissed by some as a form of irrelevant nostalgia. As Robert Goodman writes: "Lamenting lost clinical skills is possibly one of our profession's oldest pastimes, dating back centuries, if not millennia...Should we spend more time at the bedside? Certainly... But... we should spend this time not divining for ascitic fluid (ultrasound is better) but, instead, talking to our patients.

== Published works and speaking engagements ==
Verghese has written articles for medical journals such as The New England Journal of Medicine, JAMA, The Lancet, and The American Journal of Medicine. He has also contributed to general-interest publications like The New Yorker, Texas Monthly, Atlantic, The New York Times, Granta, Forbes, and The Wall Street Journal, among others.

Verghese has also written four books based on his life experiences and his medical knowledge.

- My Own Country: A Doctor's Story (non-fiction, 1994)
- The Tennis Partner (non-fiction, 1998)
- Cutting for Stone (novel, 2008)
- The Covenant of Water (novel, 2023)
- Abscond: A Short Story (short story, 2025)

Verghese is also often asked to speak about his ideas on medical care and about his life story and his books. For example:

- A doctor's touch (TED talk, September 2011)
- B&N Reads podcast Poured Over: Abraham Verghese on The Covenant of Water (May 2023)
- Super Soul Presents: Oprah's Book Club — The Covenant of Water Companion Podcast, a 6-part series hosted by Oprah Winfrey (2023)
- Co-host of the Medscape podcast Medicine and the Machine.
- Harvard University commencement speech on May 29, 2025. He lauded Harvard's opposition to the Trump administration's recent attacks against it.

== Awards and honors ==
- Lambda Literary Award for Gay Men's Biography/Autobiography for My Own Country (1995)
- Wellcome Book Prize Shortlist for Cutting for Stone (2009)
- Member of the Institute of Medicine (2011)
- Heinz Award in the Arts and Humanities (2014)
- National Humanities Medal (2015) for "his efforts to emphasize empathy in medicine [and] his imaginative renderings of the human drama."
- Guggenheim Fellowship (2023)
- Honorary doctorate degrees from: Harvard University (2025), College of the Holy Cross (2022), McMaster University (2017), Royal College of Surgeons of Ireland (2014), Upstate Medical University, SUNY Syracuse (2012), University of Northern Illinois (2007), and Swarthmore College (2001).
