= Winnie Varghese =

Dean of the Cathedral of St. John the Divine (born 1972)

The Very Reverend Winnie Varghese
- Church: Episcopal Church USA
- Archdiocese: Episcopal Diocese of New York
- Appointed: 2025
- Predecessor: Patrick Malloy

Orders
- Ordination: January 8, 2000
- Rank: Dean

Personal details
- Born: May 28, 1972 (age 54) Dallas, Texas, U.S.
- Denomination: Christian
- Education: Agnes Scott College; Southern Methodist University; Union Theological Seminary

The Very Reverend Winnie Sara Varghese (born May 28, 1972) is an American Episcopal priest who has served as the 12th Dean of the Cathedral of St. John the Divine in New York City since 2025. She is the first woman and person of color to hold this position.

== Early life and education ==
Varghese was born and raised in Dallas, Texas, to parents who immigrated from Kerala, India. Her family returned to India when she was young, but moved back to the U.S. several years later. Her first language was Malayalam, and she learned English at the age of 4.

Although raised in the Episcopal Church, Varghese did not become fully invested in the faith until college, when she took a course on women in the Hebrew Bible. She attended Agnes Scott College in Decatur, Georgia, and graduated in 1994 from Southern Methodist University in Dallas with a degree in religious studies. She earned a Masters of Divinity from Union Theological Seminary in 1999.

== Career ==
In 1993, as part of a yearlong Episcopal internship program, Varghese undertook outreach work with mentally ill and homeless residents in Long Beach, California.

In 1999, following her graduation from Union Theological Seminary, she was ordained as a deacon in the Episcopal Diocese of Los Angeles. She was ordained as a priest on January 8, 2000. She returned to the Los Angeles Diocese, working as a chaplain at UCLA and at a church in west Los Angeles. In late 2002, Varghese moved to New York City, where she was an Episcopal chaplain at Columbia University until May 2009.

In 2009, Varghese was appointed to serve as pastor and priest-in-charge of St. Mark’s Church in the Bowery in New York City and in 2012 became its first female rector. The Rt. Rev. Barbara Harris, the first woman bishop in the worldwide Anglican Communion, preached at the installation. As rector, Varghese pushed to update the building to ensure accessibility for wheelchair users. After leaving St. Mark's, Varghese served as a priest for ministry and program coordination at Trinity Church in New York City.

Varghese served as Rector of St. Luke’s Episcopal Church in Atlanta, Georgia, from 2021 to 2025.

In April 2025, Varghese was appointed as the 12th Dean of the Cathedral of St. John the Divine in New York City, and was installed in that role in September 2025.

=== Other roles ===
Varghese is a co-founder and director of Enfleshing Witness: Rewilding Otherwise Preaching. This initiative, funded by the Lilly Endowment via St. Luke’s Church in Atlanta, supports Black, Indigenous and otherwise racially minoritized preachers in developing their preaching practices.

In 2023, Varghese helped the Episcopal Diocese of New York develop a credit union that serves New Yorkers with a goal of expanding access to financial services for low-income households and others who may struggle to be welcomed by traditional banks. Her support for the idea was driven by her experience with a credit union established by the Diocese of Los Angeles in the 1990s.

Varghese has served as a trustee of Episcopal Divinity School (2013−2016) and Union Theological Seminary (2019−2025), and chaired the Committee on the State of the Church of the General Convention of the Episcopal Church (2015−2018).

=== Awards and recognition ===
Varghese is a widely recognized leader in the Episcopal Church. She was called “the future of our church” by the Rev. Kelly Brown Douglas, the canon theologian at the Washington National Cathedral and visiting professor at Harvard Divinity School. Union Theological Seminary said in 2025 that "Varghese has become one of the most prominent religious voices for justice and inclusion in our time."

Awards include:

- Auburn Theological Seminary Lives of Commitment Award, 2019
- City & State Community Engagement Power 50, 2021
- Metropolitan College of New York, Doctor of Humane Letters, June 2019

== Personal life ==
Varghese came out as queer at the age of 17. She has two children and is married to a woman. Her brother is the comic Paul Varghese.

== Publications ==
- Church Meets World (New York: Church Publishing, 2016) ISBN 9780819232717 Series: Church's Teachings for a Changing World
- What We Shall Become: The Future and Structure of the Episcopal Church. Church Publishing, Inc. 2013-10-01. ISBN 978-0-89869-896-1.
- One Single ACT: Gestures of Kindness, Compassion, and Courage That Change Us and the World (Morehouse, 2026) ISBN 9781640659872
